= List of The Boat Race results =

- The Boat Race; The Cancer Research UK Boat Race
- Contested by
CUBC	OUBC
- theboatraces.org
First boat race	10 June 1829
Annual event since	15 March 1856
Current champion	Cambridge (2026)
- Course: Henley-on-Thames (1829)
- Westminster to Putney (1836–42)
- The Championship Course (1845–2019; 2022–present)
- River Great Ouse (2021)
Smallest margin of victory	Oxford, 1 foot (30 cm) (2003)
Course Record (Championship Course)	Cambridge, 16:19 (1998)
Current sponsor	CHANEL J12
Trophy	The Boat Race Trophy
- Number of wins
Cambridge	Oxford
89	81
- Note: There has been one dead heat, recorded in 1877

The Boat Race is a side-by-side rowing competition between the men's senior boat clubs of the University of Oxford (sometimes referred to as the "Dark Blues") and the University of Cambridge (sometimes referred to as the "Light Blues"). The race was first held in 1829 on a 2 1/4-mile (3.6 km) stretch of the River Thames. For the women's senior boat clubs race see "The Women's Boat Race".

As of 2015 the race takes place on the 4.2-mile (6.8 km) Championship Course, between Putney and Mortlake on the Thames in south-west London. The rivalry is a major point of honour between the two universities; it is followed throughout the United Kingdom and broadcast worldwide. Four unofficial boat races were held during the Second World War, both on the Thames and the Great Ouse in Ely. The crews were not recognised as full Blues and as such, the results of these races are not included in the official tally.

As of the 2025 race, Cambridge lead overall in the competition with 88 victories to Oxford's 81; the 1877 race was declared a "dead heat" (there was no post clearly marking the finishing line until the following year). Cambridge have led Oxford in cumulative wins since 1930.

The reserve crews of Oxford and Cambridge University Boat Clubs have also raced against one another since 1967. Oxford's boat Isis (named after The Isis, a section of the Thames which flows through Oxford) and Cambridge's boat Goldie (named after former Cambridge boat club president John Goldie) compete on The Championship Course, usually on the same day as the main Boat Race. As at 2021, Cambridge's reserve crew have the overall lead with 32 victories to Oxford's 24.

== Results ==
Cumulative wins by Oxford and Cambridge men's and women's blue and reserve boats (In the SVG file, hover over a graph to highlight it.)

The first race, held in 1829, took place on a 2 1/4-mile (3.6 km) stretch of the Thames between Hambleden Lock and Henley Bridge. It was officially recorded that Oxford won the race "easily". Seven years passed before the second race, which Cambridge won by 20 lengths, along a 5 3/4-mile (9.3 km) course between Westminster Bridge and Putney Bridge. A further four races, three of which were won by the Light Blues, took place along the same course. The 1845 race was the first to be conducted on The Championship Course, the same course in use as of the 2015 race, and was won by Cambridge by ten lengths. Having won the ninth Boat Race "easily", Cambridge led 7–2 overall, and were challenged, for the first and only time, to a second race in the same year. Oxford were victorious as the Light Blues were disqualified, the only time that event that the race was decided in such a manner.

The 1859 race was the first in which one of the crews sank: Cambridge's crew were variously rescued or swam to the shore, while Oxford took the overall record to 9–7 in Cambridge's favour. Between the 1861 and 1869 race, Oxford made a then-record streak of nine consecutive victories; Cambridge won the next five and were 16–15 ahead after the 1874 race. A dead heat in the 1877 race is the only time in the event that such an official result has been given. Cambridge won four consecutive races between 1886 and 1889, to which Oxford responded with a then record-equalling streak of nine consecutive victories, with Oxford leading the overall record 32–22. Cambridge won the 1900 race by 20 lengths, the largest margin of victory of the races contested on The Championship Course. The 1912 race saw both boats sink, so a re-row was ordered two days later which Oxford won.

Cambridge won the last race before the First World War suspended the event for five years. The Light Blues won in 1920, 1921 and 1922 before Oxford triumphed in the 1923 race. Cambridge subsequently won thirteen consecutive races from 1924 to lead 47–40 overall by 1936. Another hiatus, this time six years long, was caused by the Second World War, after which the Light Blues won five of the next six races. A streak of six wins saw Cambridge 16 wins ahead overall after the 1973 race. Oxford won seventeen of the next nineteen years, and were just a single victory behind after the 1992 race, the overall record 69–68 in Cambridge's favour. The Light Blues then won the following seven races, including setting the record time along The Championship Course of 16 minutes 19 seconds in the 1998 race. Their dominance faded, and the Dark Blues sealed victory in the 2000 race to trail overall by seven wins, 76–69. The 2003 race was the closest in history, with the Dark Blues winning by 30 centimetres (12 in), while the 2012 race was decided after a restart midway through the race following disruption from a protester. Cambridge won the 2021 race, taking the overall record to 85–80 in Cambridge's favour.

The overall record has been tied on just three occasions: following The Boat Race 1836, it was one victory each. Oxford's third win in a row in the 1863 race took the record to 10–10, while Cambridge's sixth victory in a streak of thirteen wins between 1924 and 1936 tied the universities at 40–40.

=== Main race ===
All races from 1845 to 2019, and 2022 onwards have taken place on The Championship Course. Earlier races and the 2021 event took place in different locations, marked by †, ‡ and *.

The Championship Course has hosted the Boat Race since 1845.

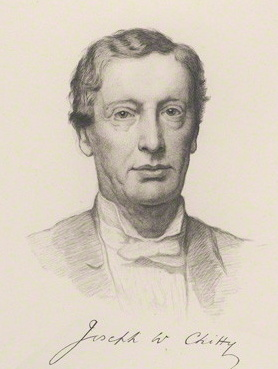
Joseph William Chitty umpired the 1863 race after which the record was tied at ten wins each.

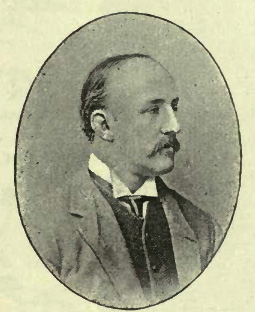
Charles Gurdon helped Cambridge to defeat Oxford "easily" in the 1876 race.

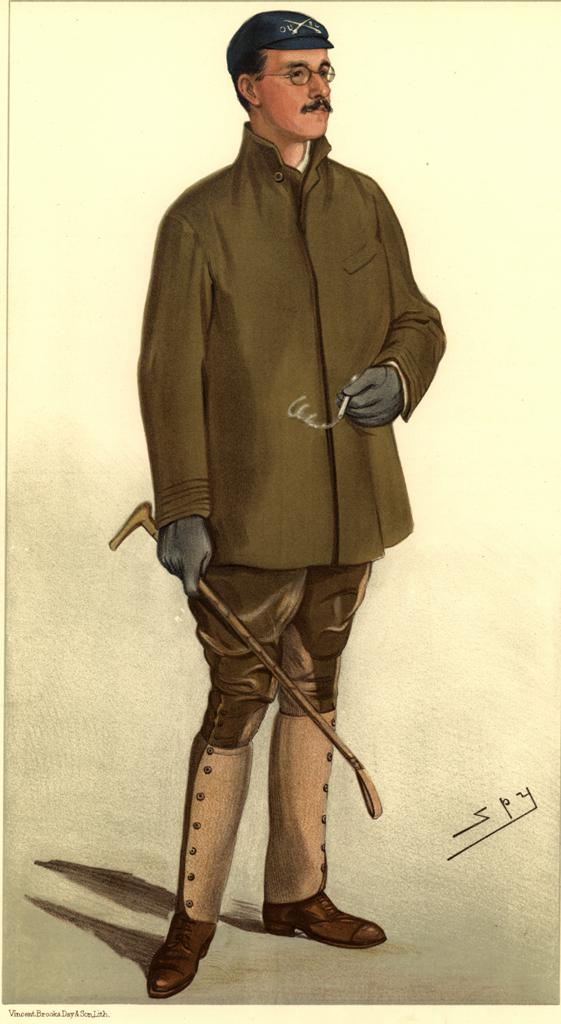
Douglas McLean (Vanity Fair caricature pictured) rowed five times for Oxford between 1883 and 1887.

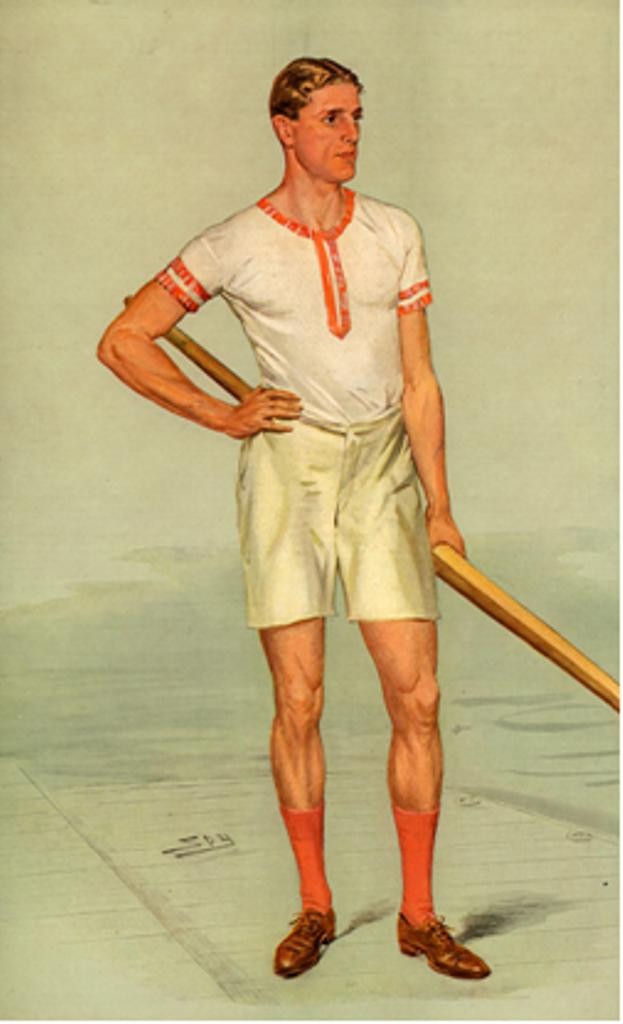
Raymond Etherington-Smith (Vanity Fair caricature pictured) helped Cambridge to a 20-length victory in 1900.

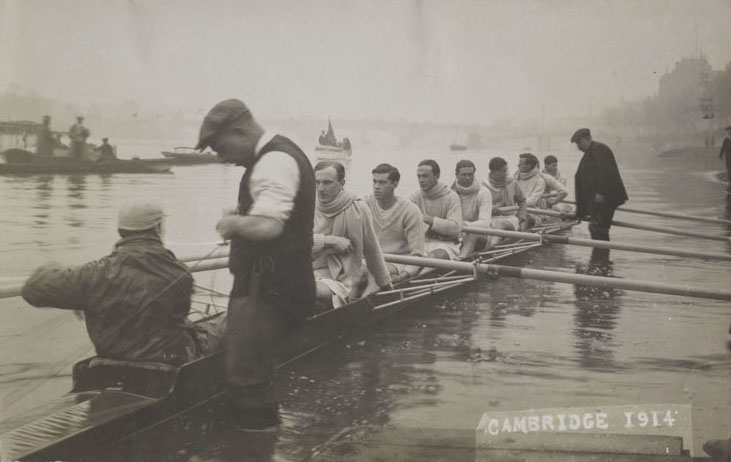
The victorious 1914 Cambridge crew

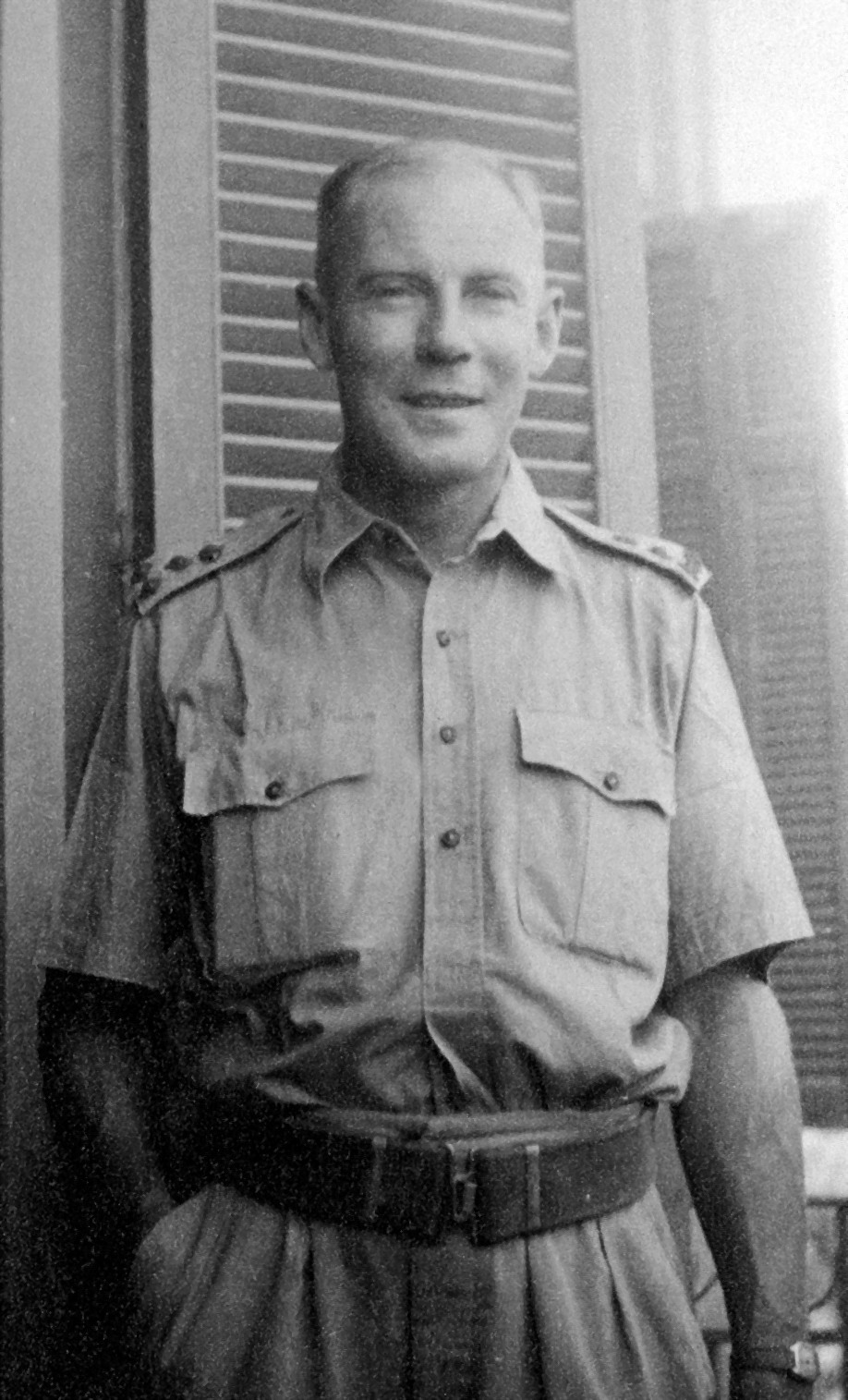
Hugh Cairns rowed in the losing Oxford crew in the 1920 race, the first race after the First World War.

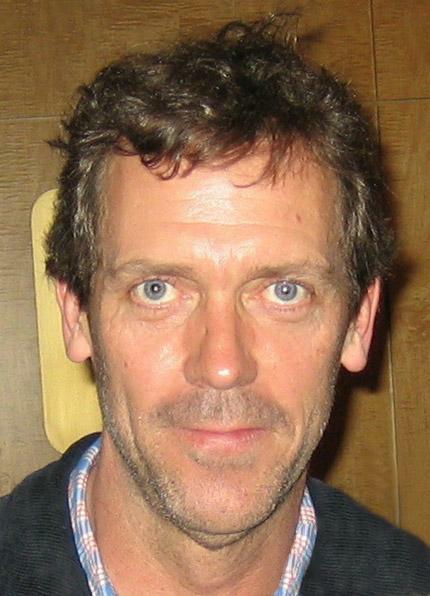
Hugh Laurie rowed for Cambridge in the 1980 race. Oxford won by a canvas. (Note: The front end of a racing boat was at one time covered with canvas. To win "by a canvas" is to win by the length between the tip of the bow and the first oarsman.)

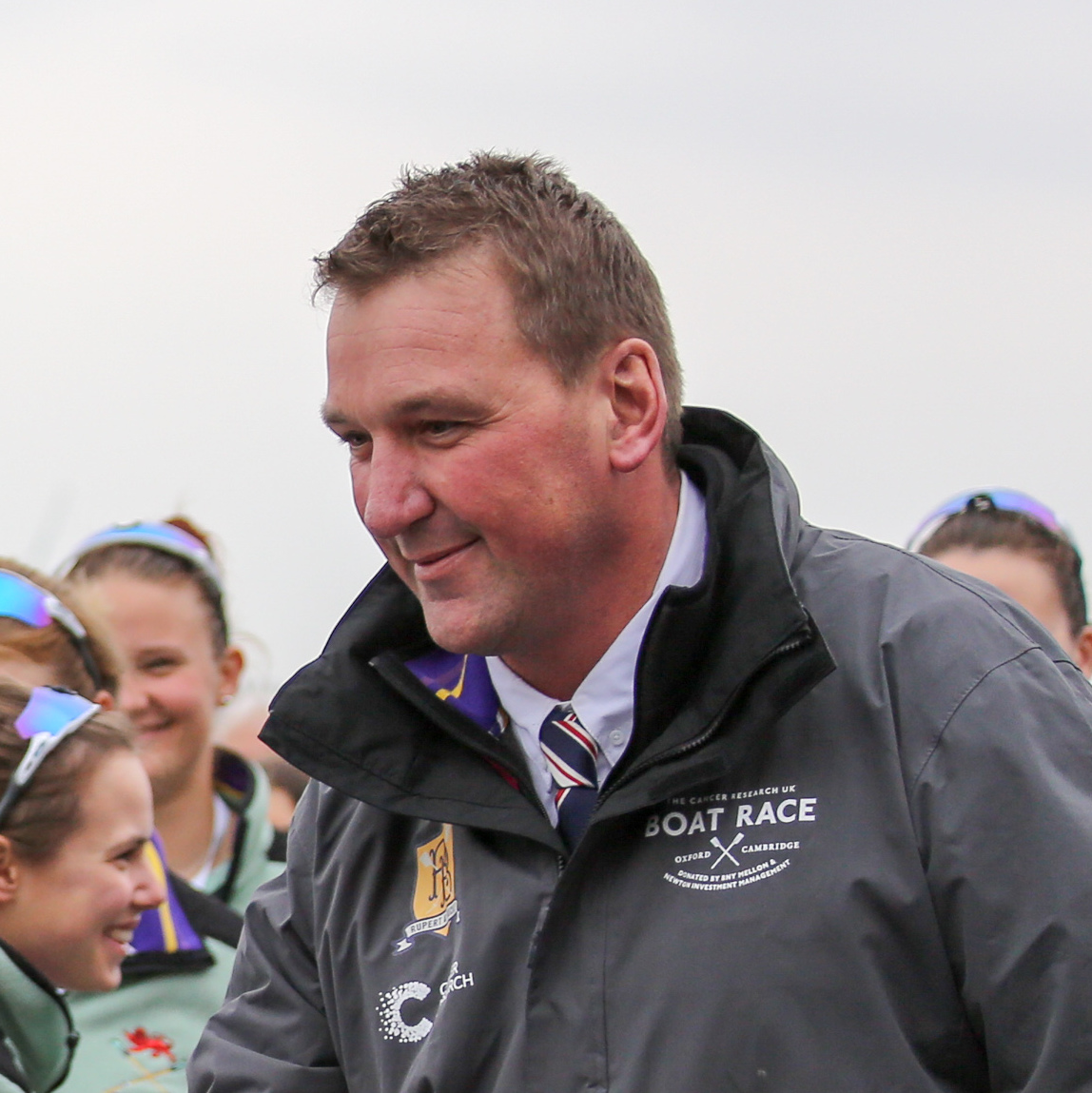
Matthew Pinsent won twice with Oxford in 1990 and 1991. He also competed in 1993.

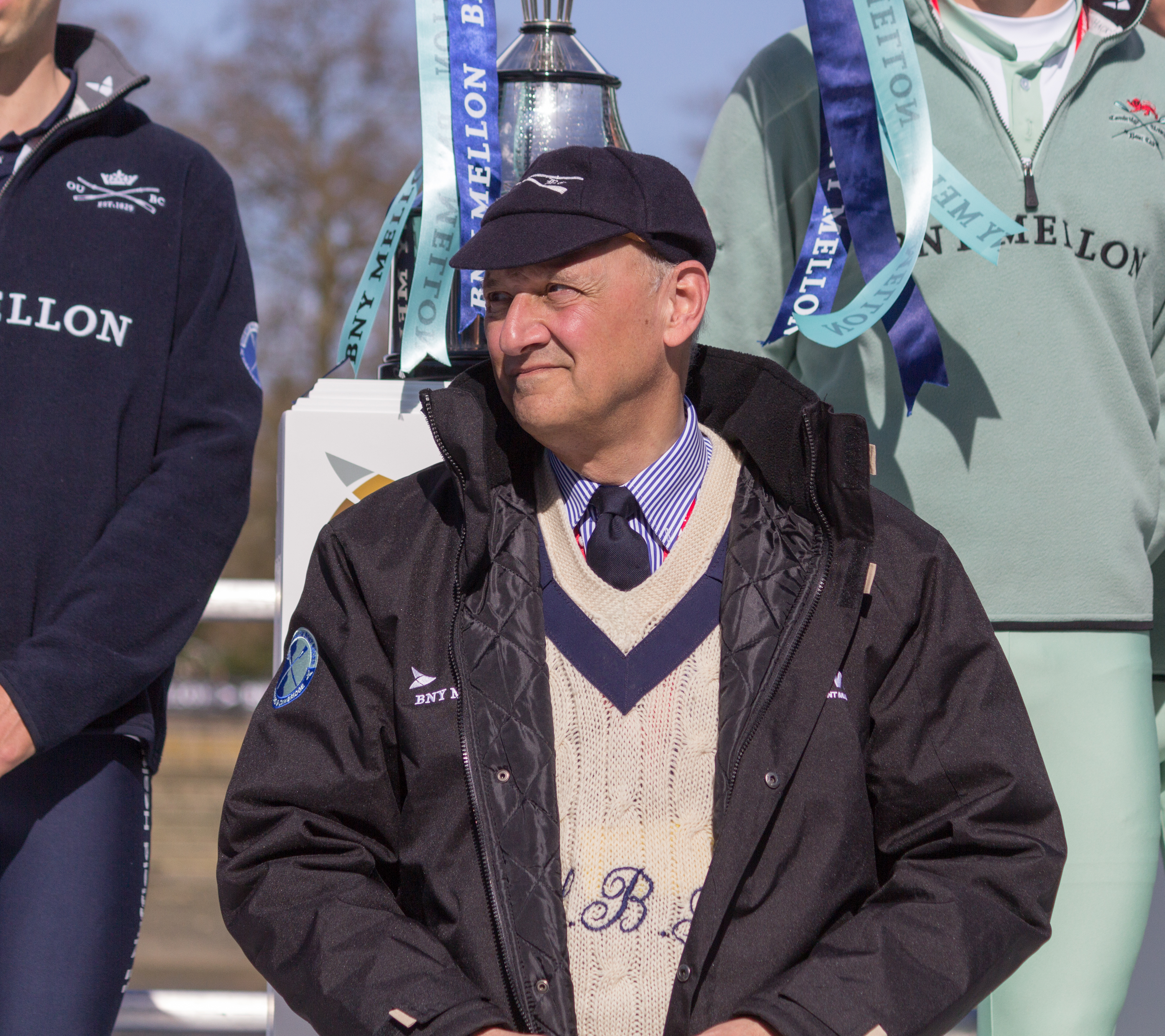
Former record six-time Oxford rower Boris Rankov umpired the closest race in the history of the event in 2003.

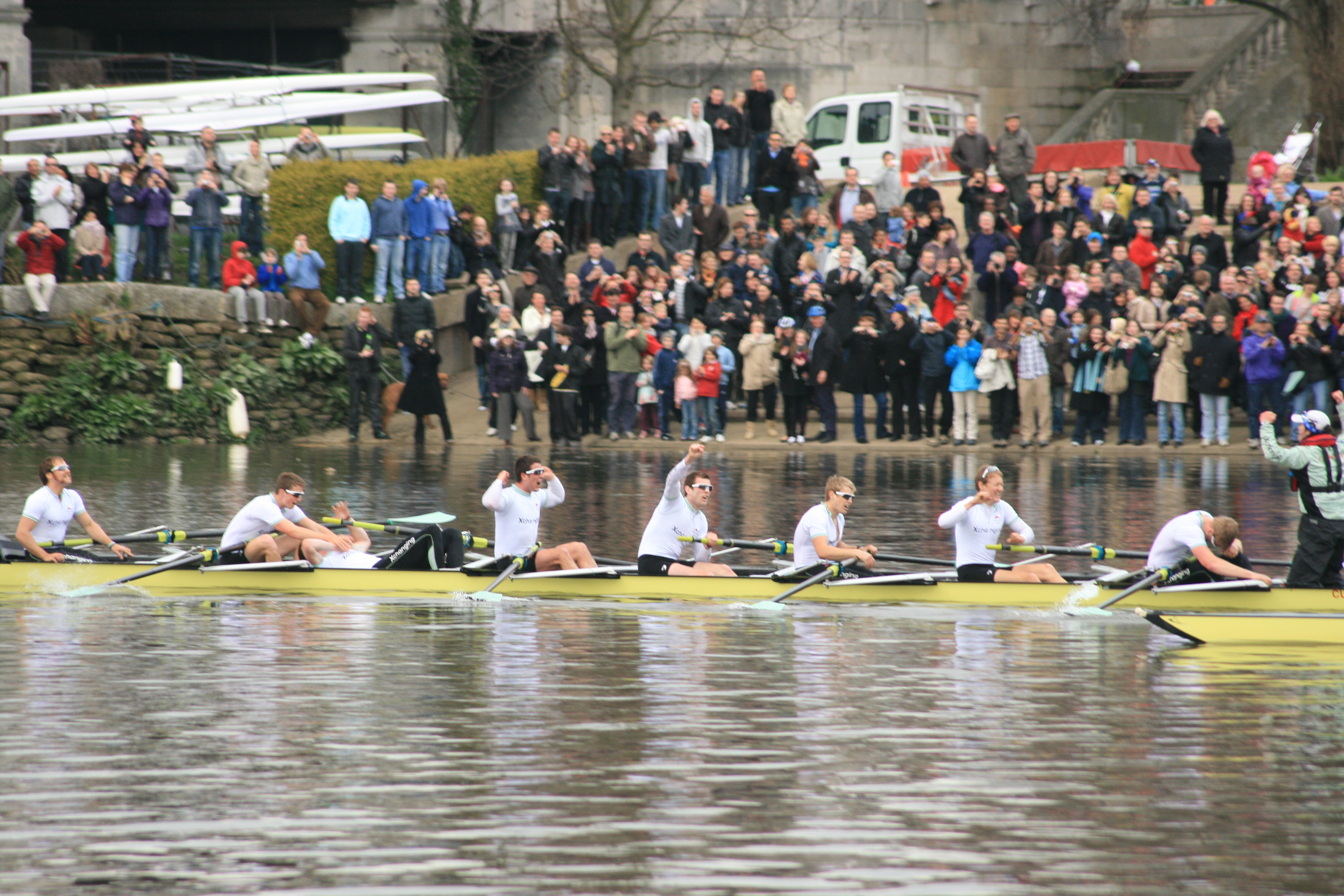
Cambridge secured their 80th victory in the 2010 race.

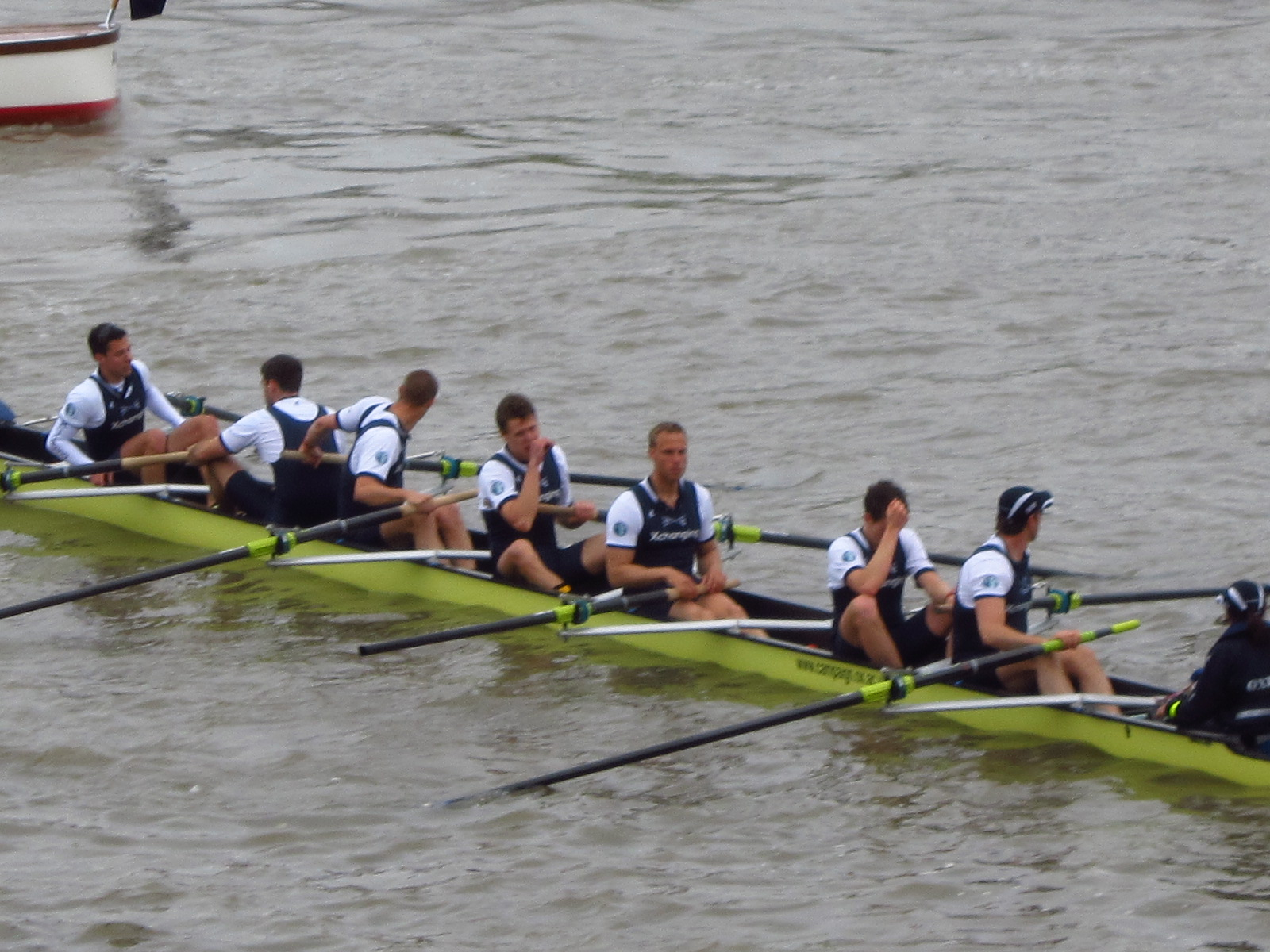
Oxford lost the 2012 race which was disrupted by a protester in the Thames.

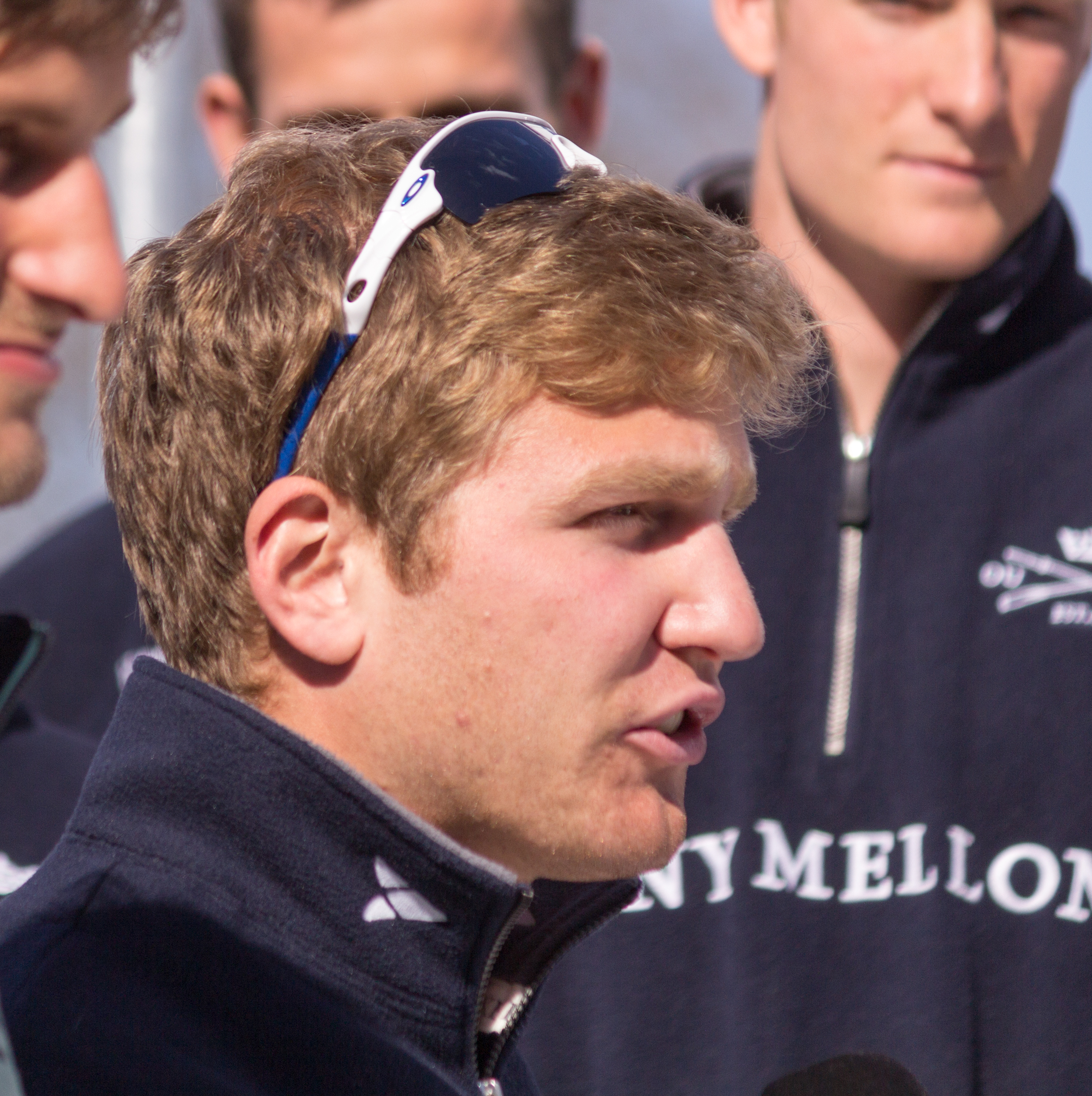
Oxford University Boat Club President Constantine Louloudis led Oxford to their 79th victory in the 2015 race.

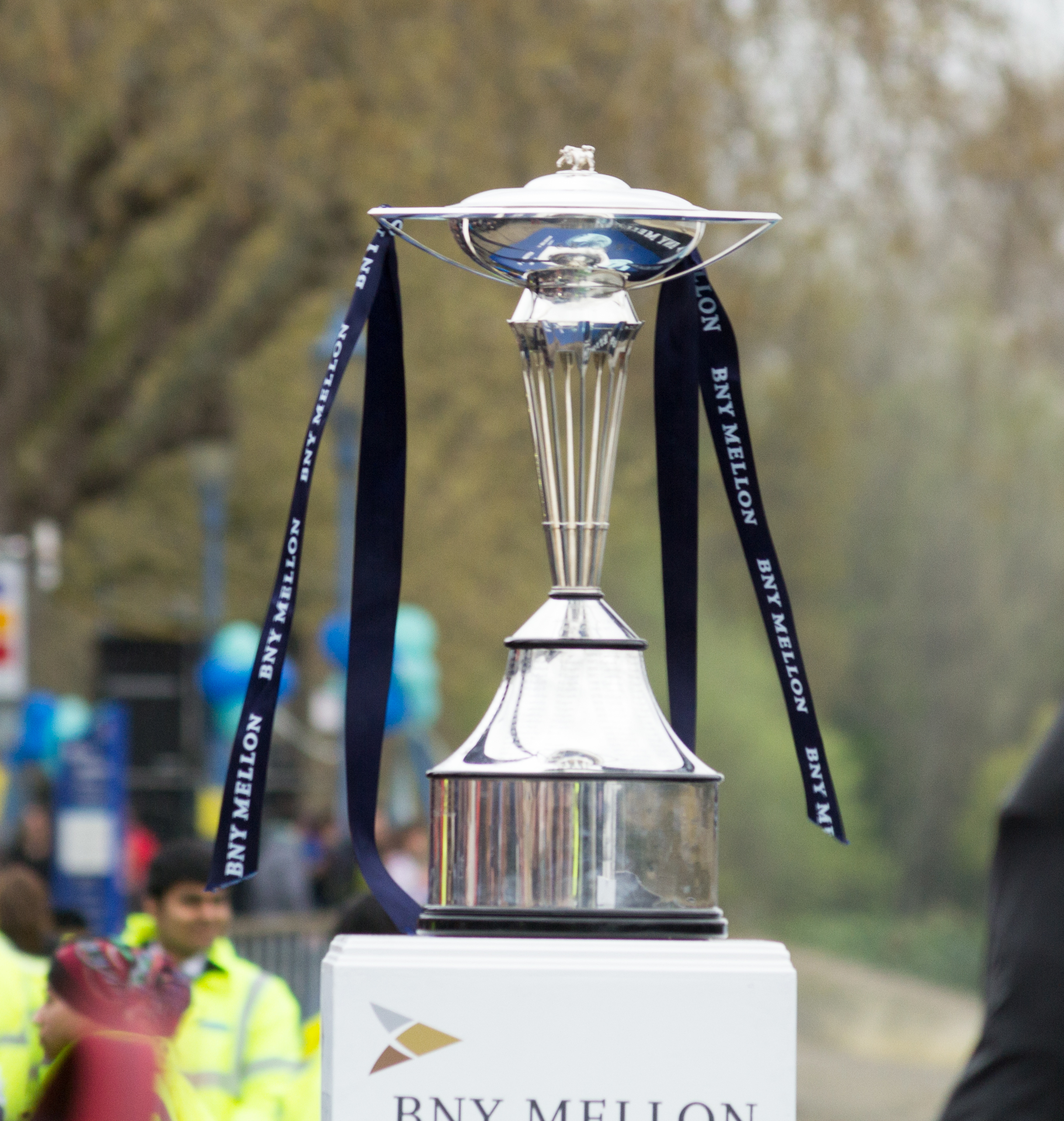
The men's Boat Race trophy (pictured in 2014)

No.	Date	Winner	Winning time	Margin of victory	Oxford total	Cambridge total
1	10 June 1829 †; 1830–1835 no race	Oxford	14:03	Easily	1	0
2	17 June 1836 ‡ 1837–1838 no race	Cambridge	36:00	20 lengths	1	1
3	3 April 1839 ‡	Cambridge	31:00	35 lengths	1	2
4	15 April 1840 ‡	Cambridge	29:03	3/4 length	1	3
5	14 April 1841 ‡	Cambridge	32:03	22 lengths	1	4
6	11 June 1842 ‡ 1843–1844 no race	Oxford	30:01	4 1/2 lengths	2	4
7	15 March 1845	Cambridge	23:30	10 lengths	2	5
8	3 April 1846; 1847–1848 no race	Cambridge	21:05	3 lengths	2	6
9	29 March 1849	Cambridge	22:00	Easily	2	7
10	15 December 1849; 1850–1851 no race	Oxford	foul	Cambridge disqualified^{[a]}	3	7
11	3 April 1852; 1853 no race	Oxford	21:36	9 lengths	4	7
12	8 April 1854; 1855 no race	Oxford	25:29	7 lengths	5	7
13	15 March 1856	Cambridge	25:45	1/4 length	5	8
14	4 April 1857	Oxford	22:05	11 lengths	6	8
15	27 March 1858	Cambridge	21:23	7 1/2 lengths	6	9
16	15 April 1859	Oxford	24:04	Cambridge sank	7	9
17	31 March 1860	Cambridge	26:05	1 length	7	10
18	23 March 1861	Oxford	23:03	16 lengths	8	10
19	12 April 1862	Oxford	24:34	10 lengths	9	10
20	28 March 1863	Oxford	23:06	15 lengths	10	10
21	19 March 1864	Oxford	21:04	9 lengths	11	10
22	8 April 1865	Oxford	21:24	4 lengths	12	10
23	24 March 1866	Oxford	25:35	3 lengths	13	10
24	13 April 1867	Oxford	22:39	1/2 length	14	10
25	4 April 1868	Oxford	20:56	6 lengths	15	10
26	17 March 1869	Oxford	20:04	3 lengths	16	10
27	6 April 1870	Cambridge	22:04	1 1/2 lengths	16	11
28	1 April 1871	Cambridge	23:01	1 length	16	12
29	23 March 1872	Cambridge	21:15	2 lengths	16	13
30	29 March 1873	Cambridge	19:35	3 lengths	16	14
31	28 March 1874	Cambridge	22:35	3 1/2 lengths	16	15
32	20 March 1875	Oxford	22:02	10 lengths	17	15
33	8 April 1876	Cambridge	20:02	Easily	17	16
34	24 March 1877	Dead heat	24:08	Dead heat	17	16
35	13 April 1878	Oxford	22:15	10 lengths	18	16
36	5 April 1879	Cambridge	21:18	3 lengths	18	17
37	22 March 1880	Oxford	21:23	3 3/4 lengths	19	17
38	8 April 1881	Oxford	21:51	3 lengths	20	17
39	1 April 1882	Oxford	20:12	7 lengths	21	17
40	15 March 1883	Oxford	21:18	3 1/2 lengths	22	17
41	7 April 1884	Cambridge	21:39	2 1/2 lengths	22	18
42	28 March 1885	Oxford	21:36	2 1/2 lengths	23	18
43	3 April 1886	Cambridge	22:03	2/3 length	23	19
44	26 March 1887	Cambridge	20:52	2 1/2 lengths	23	20
45	24 March 1888	Cambridge	20:48	7 lengths	23	21
46	30 March 1889	Cambridge	20:14	3 lengths	23	22
47	26 March 1890	Oxford	22:03	1 length	24	22
48	21 March 1891	Oxford	21:48	1/2 length	25	22
49	9 April 1892	Oxford	19:01	2 1/4 lengths	26	22
50	22 March 1893	Oxford	18:45	1 1/4 lengths	27	22
51	17 March 1894	Oxford	21:39	3 1/2 lengths	28	22
52	30 March 1895	Oxford	20:05	2 1/4 lengths	29	22
53	28 March 1896	Oxford	20:01	2/5 length	30	22
54	3 April 1897	Oxford	19:12	2 1/2 lengths	31	22
55	26 March 1898	Oxford	22:15	Easily	32	22
56	25 March 1899	Cambridge	21:04	3 1/4 lengths	32	23
57	31 March 1900	Cambridge	18:45	20 lengths	32	24
58	30 March 1901	Oxford	22:31	2/3 length	33	24
59	22 March 1902	Cambridge	19:09	5 lengths	33	25
60	1 April 1903	Cambridge	19:33	6 lengths	33	26
61	26 March 1904	Cambridge	21:37	4 1/2 lengths	33	27
62	1 April 1905	Oxford	20:35	3 lengths	34	27
63	7 April 1906	Cambridge	19:25	3 1/2 lengths	34	28
64	16 March 1907	Cambridge	20:26	4 1/2 lengths	34	29
65	4 April 1908	Cambridge	19:02	2 1/2 lengths	34	30
66	3 April 1909	Oxford	19:05	3 1/2 lengths	35	30
67	23 March 1910	Oxford	20:14	3 1/2 lengths	36	30
68	1 April 1911	Oxford	18:29	2 3/4 lengths	37	30
69	30 March 1912; 1 April 1912^{[b]}	Oxford	22:05	6 lengths	38	30
70	13 March 1913	Oxford	20:53	3/4 length	39	30
71	28 March 1914; 1915–1919 no race	Cambridge	20:23	4 1/2 lengths	39	31
72	27 March 1920	Cambridge	21:11	4 lengths	39	32
73	30 March 1921	Cambridge	19:45	1 length	39	33
74	1 April 1922	Cambridge	19:27	4 1/2 lengths	39	34
75	24 March 1923	Oxford	20:54	3/4 length	40	34
76	5 April 1924	Cambridge	18:41	4 1/2 lengths	40	35
77	28 March 1925	Cambridge	21:05	Oxford sank	40	36
78	27 March 1926	Cambridge	19:29	5 lengths	40	37
79	2 April 1927	Cambridge	20:14	3 lengths	40	38
80	31 March 1928	Cambridge	20:25	10 lengths	40	39
81	23 March 1929	Cambridge	19:24	7 lengths	40	40
82	12 April 1930	Cambridge	19:09	3 lengths	40	41
83	21 March 1931	Cambridge	19:26	2 1/2 lengths	40	42
84	19 March 1932	Cambridge	19:11	5 lengths	40	43
85	1 April 1933	Cambridge	20:57	2 1/4 lengths	40	44
86	17 March 1934	Cambridge	18:03	4 1/4 lengths	40	45
87	6 April 1935	Cambridge	19:48	4 1/2 lengths	40	46
88	4 April 1936	Cambridge	21:06	5 lengths	40	47
89	24 March 1937	Oxford	22:39	1/4 length	41	47
90	2 April 1938	Oxford	20:03	2 lengths	42	47
91	1 April 1939; 1940–1945 no race	Cambridge	19:03	4 lengths	42	48
92	30 March 1946	Oxford	19:54	3 lengths	43	48
93	29 March 1947	Cambridge	23:01	10 lengths	43	49
94	27 March 1948	Cambridge	17:50	5 lengths	43	50
95	26 March 1949	Cambridge	18:57	1/4 length	43	51
96	1 April 1950	Cambridge	20:15	3 1/2 lengths	43	52
97	26 March 1951	Cambridge	20:05	12 lengths	43	53
98	29 March 1952	Oxford	20:23	By a canvas	44	53
99	28 March 1953	Cambridge	19:54	8 lengths	44	54
100	3 April 1954	Oxford	20:23	4 1/2 lengths	45	54
101	26 March 1955	Cambridge	19:01	16 lengths	45	55
102	24 March 1956	Cambridge	18:36	1 1/4 lengths	45	56
103	30 March 1957	Cambridge	19:01	2 lengths	45	57
104	5 April 1958	Cambridge	18:15	3 1/2 lengths	45	58
105	28 March 1959	Oxford	18:52	6 lengths	46	58
106	2 April 1960	Oxford	18:59	1 1/4 lengths	47	58
107	1 April 1961	Cambridge	19:22	4 1/4 lengths	47	59
108	7 April 1962	Cambridge	19:46	5 lengths	47	60
109	23 March 1963	Oxford	20:47	5 lengths	48	60
110	28 March 1964	Cambridge	19:18	6 1/2 lengths	48	61
111	3 April 1965	Oxford	18:07	4 lengths	49	61
112	26 March 1966	Oxford	19:12	3 3/4 lengths	50	61
113	25 March 1967	Oxford	18:52	3 1/4 lengths	51	61
114	30 March 1968	Cambridge	18:22	3 1/2 lengths	51	62
115	5 April 1969	Cambridge	18:04	4 lengths	51	63
116	28 March 1970	Cambridge	20:22	3 1/2 lengths	51	64
117	27 March 1971	Cambridge	17:58	10 lengths	51	65
118	1 April 1972	Cambridge	18:36	9 1/2 lengths	51	66
119	7 March 1973	Cambridge	19:21	13 lengths	51	67
120	6 April 1974	Oxford	17:35	5 1/2 lengths	52	67
121	29 March 1975	Cambridge	19:27	3 3/4 lengths	52	68
122	20 March 1976	Oxford	16:58	6 1/2 lengths	53	68
123	19 March 1977	Oxford	19:28	7 lengths	54	68
124	25 March 1978	Oxford	18:58	Cambridge sank	55	68
125	17 March 1979	Oxford	20:33	3 1/2 lengths	56	68
126	5 April 1980	Oxford	19:02	By a canvas	57	68
127	4 April 1981	Oxford	18:11	8 lengths	58	68
128	27 March 1982	Oxford	18:21	3 1/4 lengths	59	68
129	2 April 1983	Oxford	19:07	4 1/2 lengths	60	68
130	18 March 1984	Oxford	16:45	3 3/4 lengths	61	68
131	6 April 1985	Oxford	17:11	4 3/4 lengths	62	68
132	29 March 1986	Cambridge	17:58	7 lengths	62	69
133	28 March 1987	Oxford	19:59	4 lengths	63	69
134	2 April 1988	Oxford	17:35	5 1/2 lengths	64	69
135	25 March 1989	Oxford	18:27	2 1/2 lengths	65	69
136	31 March 1990	Oxford	17:22	2 1/4 lengths	66	69
137	30 March 1991	Oxford	16:59	4 1/4 lengths	67	69
138	4 April 1992	Oxford	17:44	1 1/4 lengths	68	69
139	27 March 1993	Cambridge	17:00	3 1/2 lengths	68	70
140	26 March 1994	Cambridge	18:09	6 1/2 lengths	68	71
141	1 April 1995	Cambridge	18:04	4 lengths	68	72
142	6 April 1996	Cambridge	16:58	2 3/4 lengths	68	73
143	29 March 1997	Cambridge	17:38	2 lengths	68	74
144	28 March 1998	Cambridge	16:19	3 lengths	68	75
145	3 April 1999	Cambridge	16:41	3 1/2 lengths	68	76
146	25 March 2000	Oxford	18:04	3 lengths	69	76
147	24 March 2001	Cambridge	19:59	2 1/2 lengths	69	77
148	30 March 2002	Oxford	16:54	3/4 length	70	77
149	6 April 2003	Oxford	18:06	1 foot (30 cm)	71	77
150	28 March 2004	Cambridge	18:47	6 lengths	71	78
151	27 March 2005	Oxford	16:42	2 lengths	72	78
152	2 April 2006	Oxford	18:26	5 lengths	73	78
153	7 April 2007	Cambridge	17:49	1 1/4 lengths	73	79
154	29 March 2008	Oxford	20:53	6 lengths	74	79
155	29 March 2009	Oxford	17:00	3 1/2 lengths	75	79
156	3 April 2010	Cambridge	17:35	1 1/3 lengths	75	80
157	26 March 2011	Oxford	17:32	4 lengths	76	80
158	7 April 2012	Cambridge	17:23^{[c]}	4 1/4 lengths	76	81
159	31 March 2013	Oxford	17:28	1 1/3 lengths	77	81
160	6 April 2014	Oxford	18:36	11 lengths	78	81
161	11 April 2015	Oxford	17:34	6 1/2 lengths	79	81
162	27 March 2016	Cambridge	18:38	2 1/2 lengths	79	82
163	2 April 2017	Oxford	16:59	1 1/4 lengths	80	82
164	24 March 2018	Cambridge	17:51	3 lengths	80	83
165	7 April 2019	Cambridge	16:57	1 length	80	84
n/a	29 March 2020	Race cancelled due to the COVID-19 pandemic			80	84
166	4 April 2021 *	Cambridge	14:12	1 length	80	85
167	3 April 2022	Oxford	16:42	2 1/4 lengths	81	85
168	26 March 2023	Cambridge	18:18	1 1/4 lengths	81	86
169	30 March 2024	Cambridge	18:56	3 1/2 lengths	81	87
170	13 April 2025	Cambridge	16:57	5 1/2 lengths	81	88
171	4 April 2026	Cambridge	17:57	3 1/2 lengths	81	89
172	11 April 2027	TBA	TBA	TBA	TBA	TBA

† – race was held on a 2 1/4-mile (3.6 km) stretch of the Thames between Hambleden Lock and Henley Bridge.

‡ – race was held on a 5 3/4-mile (9.3 km) stretch of the Thames between Westminster Bridge and Putney Bridge.

* – race was held on a 3-mile (5 km) stretch of the River Great Ouse.

a. Cambridge (on the Surrey side) had initially gone into a clear lead, so that they were entitled to take Oxford's water on the Middlesex side. When the boats came up to Crabtree Tavern, Cambridge made for the Surrey side just as Oxford were about to overhaul them. Oxford refused to give way and the two boats collided. After a close fought race, Cambridge crossed the line first. Umpire Fellows called a foul citing the rule in the code of rowing laws governing collisions after one boat has taken the others' water: "if they come into contact by the leading boat's departing from the water so taken, the leading boat shall be deemed to have committed a foul".

b. In the first race, both boats sank, so it was restaged two days later.

c. The race was interrupted and restarted. The crews collided and an Oxford oar broke in half and the crews continued. Finish judge Ben Kent counted the total time spent racing.

=== Unofficial wartime races ===
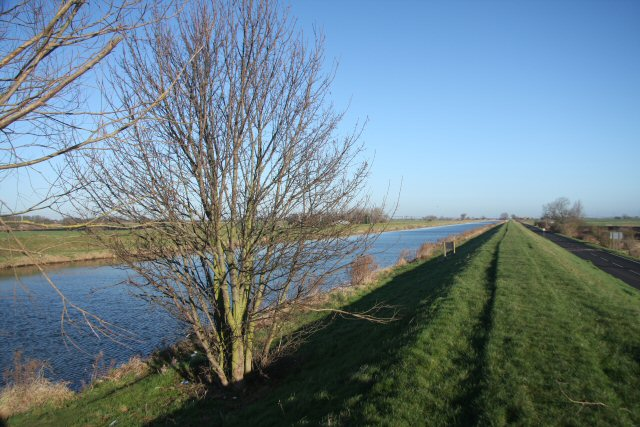
The unofficial race in 1944 was held along the Adelaide course of the Great Ouse.

During the Second World War, four races were organised at various locations, although full Blues were not awarded to the participants. In 1940, a race was held at Henley along a 1 1/2-mile (2.4 km) course which Cambridge won. A race organised in 1941 fell through and in 1942 Oxford were unable to provide a crew. In 1943, a race took place at Sandford-on-Thames in front of a crowd estimated to be between 7,000 and 10,000, where Oxford's experience of the course helped them to a narrow win. The following year, the contest was held at the Adelaide course in Ely, with Oxford winning, this time by three-quarters of a length. The final unofficial race was held, again, at Henley, along the Regatta course, which Cambridge won by two lengths. The overall record in the unofficial wartime races ended 2–2.

No.	Date	Location	Winner	Time	Margin	Ref
1	2 March 1940	Henley-on-Thames	Cambridge	9:28	5 lengths	
2	13 February 1943	Sandford-on-Thames	Oxford	4:49	2/3 length	
3	26 February 1944	River Great Ouse, Ely	Oxford	8:06	3/4 length	
4	24 February 1945	Henley-on-Thames	Cambridge	8:17	2 lengths	

=== Reserves race ===
The men's reserves race is contested between Oxford's Isis and Cambridge's Goldie. The first race was held in 1965 with Oxford's reserves taking the inaugural victory. Goldie have two eight-year winning streaks (from 1967 to 1974 and from 1990 to 1997), while Isis' best run is seven wins in a row from the 2011 to the 2017 race. As of the 2021 race, Goldie lead 32–24 overall.

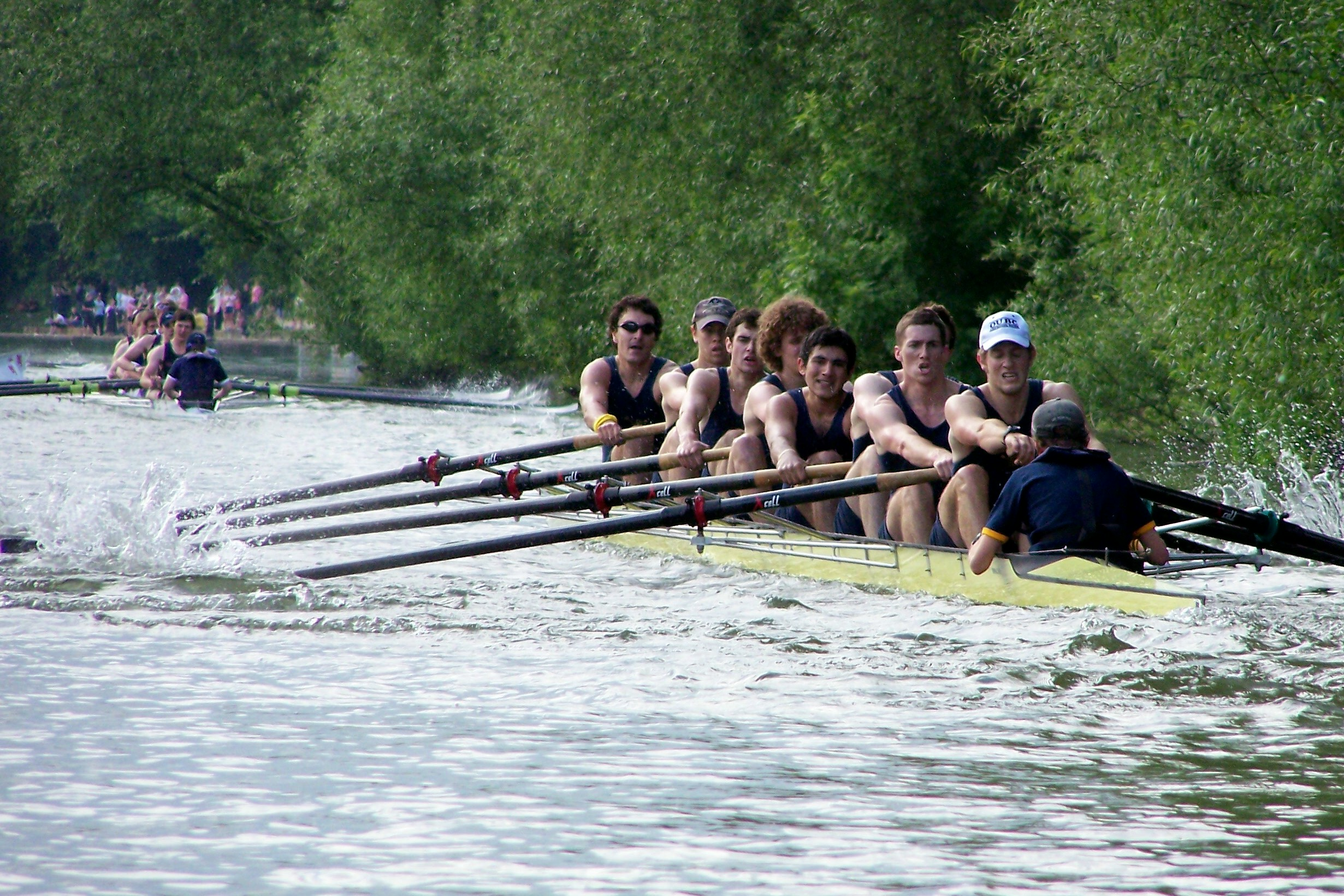
Acer Nethercott (pictured coxing in 2007), steered Isis to victory in 2002.

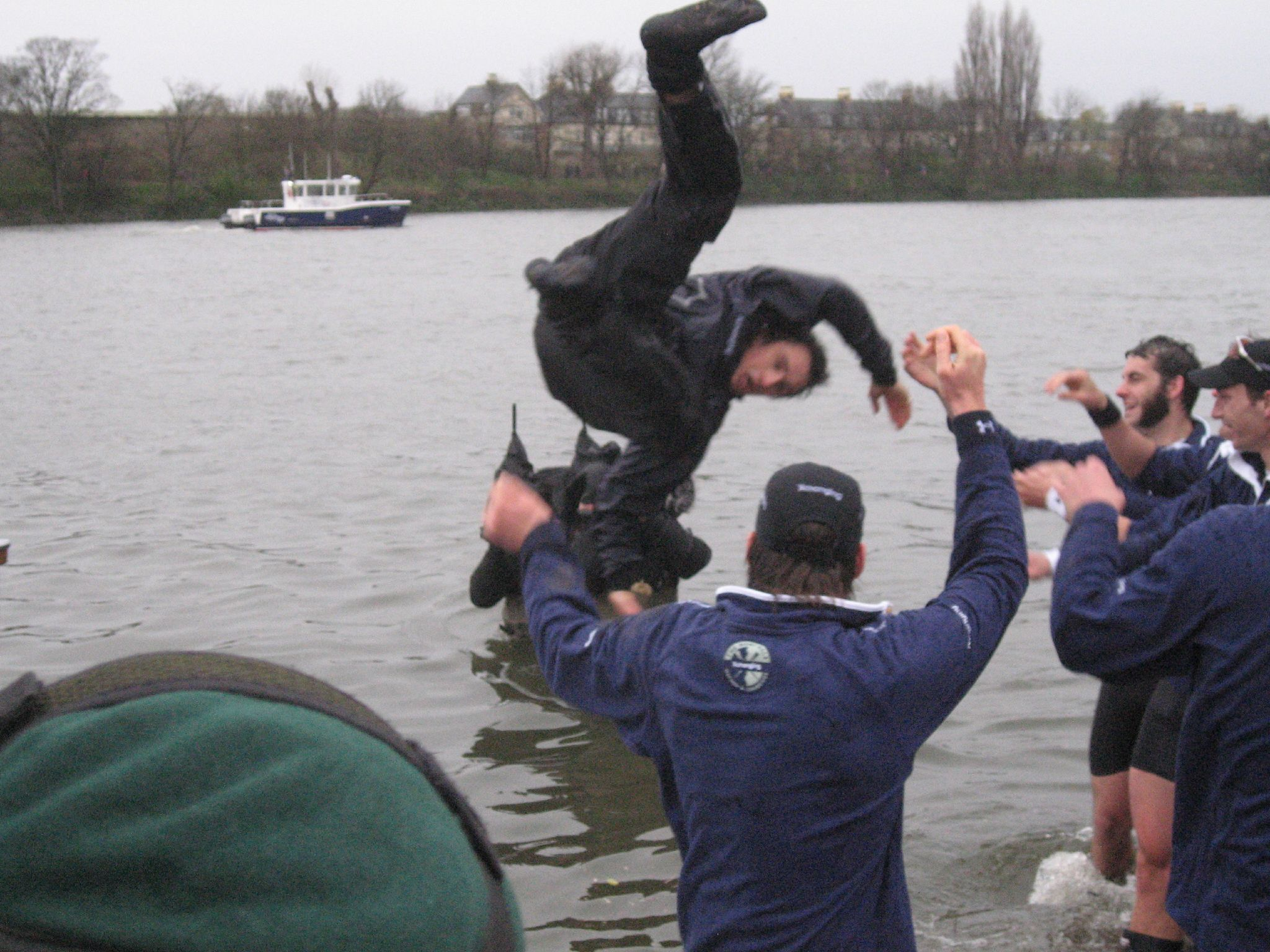
Oxford cox, Nick Brodie, (pictured being thrown into the River Thames in 2008) steered Isis in 2007

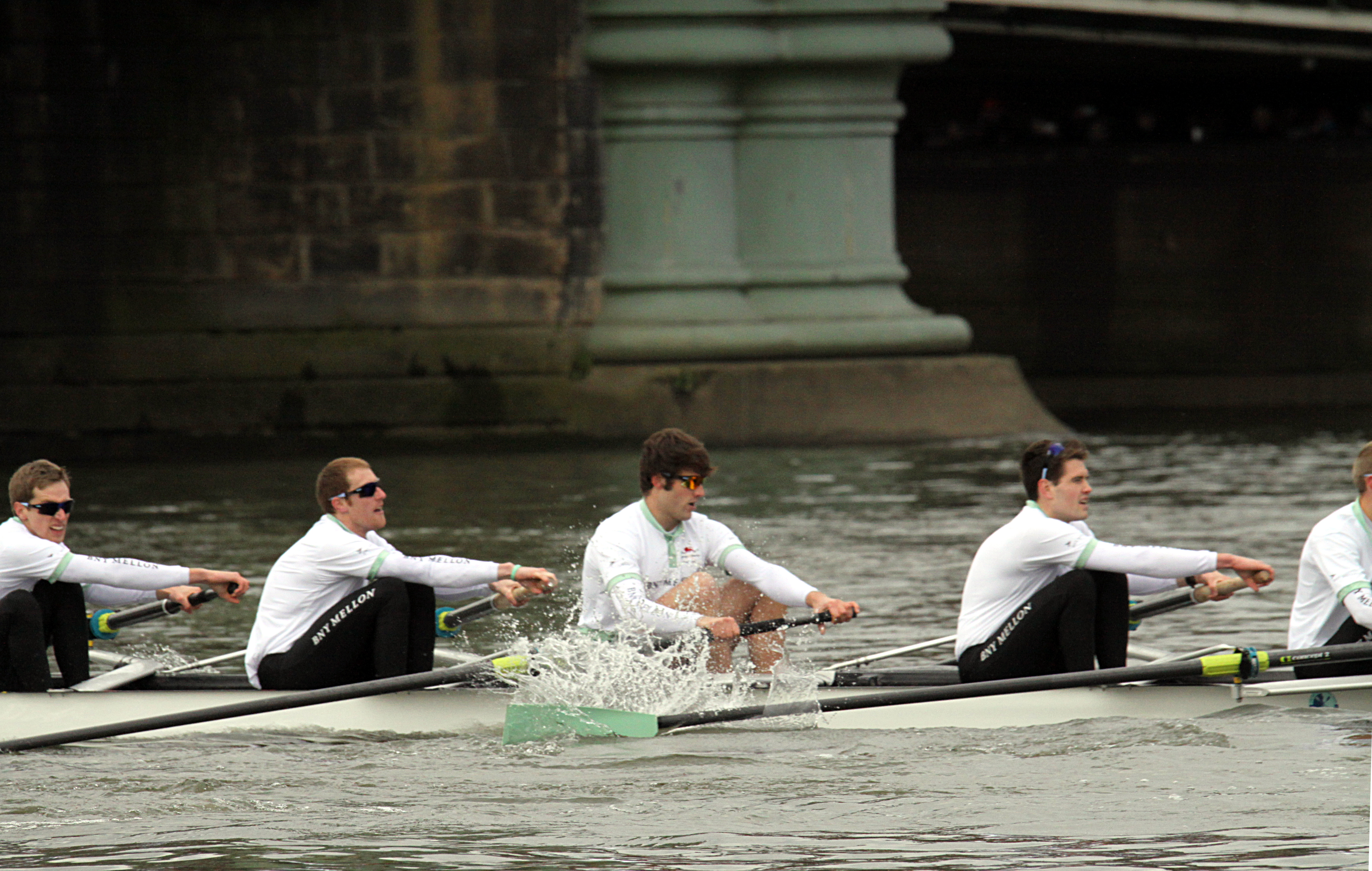
George Nash (second left, in 2013) rowed in the losing Goldie crew in 2009.

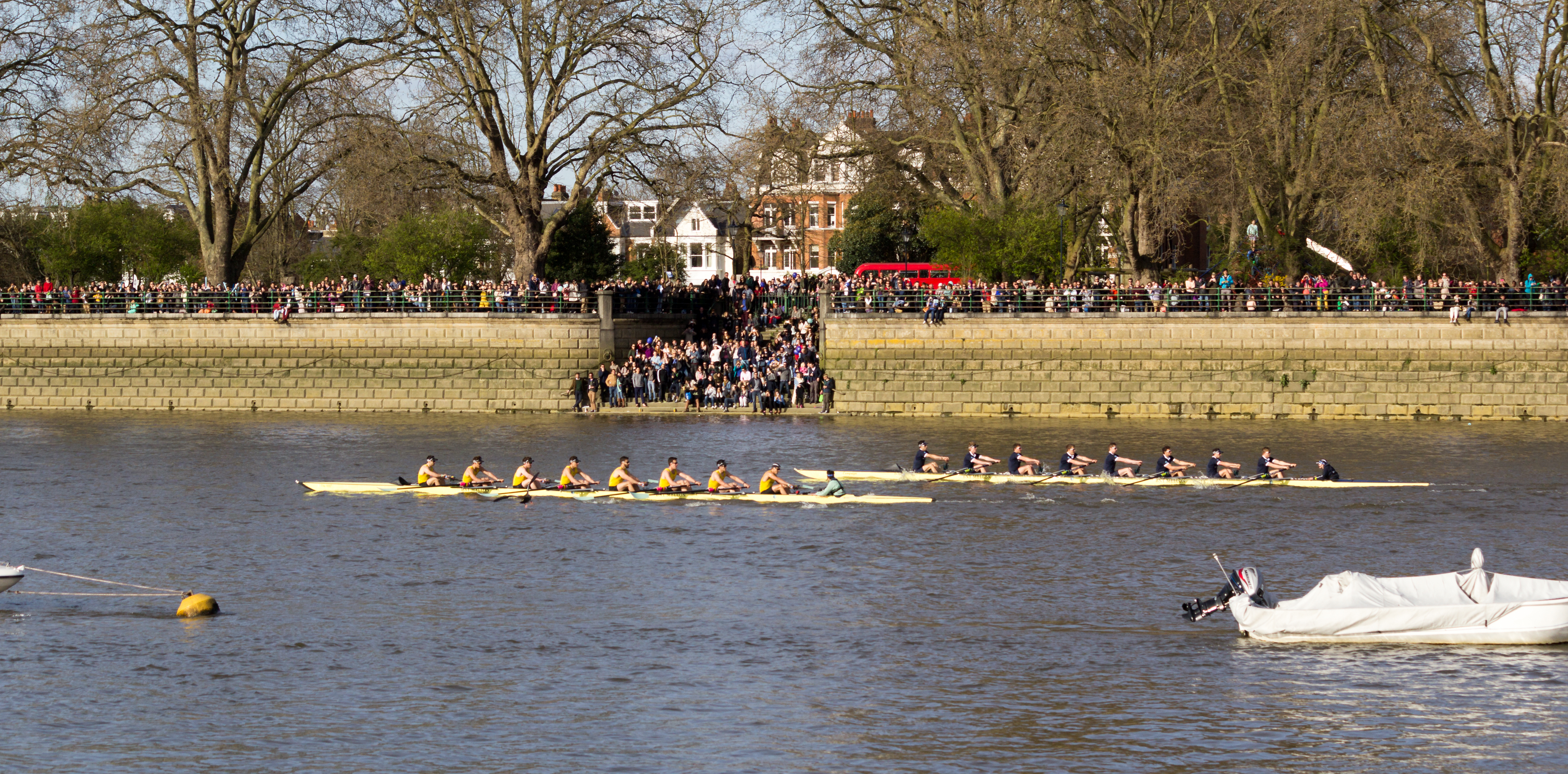
Isis racing against Goldie (foreground) in 2015

No.	Date	Winner	Winning time	Margin of victory	Isis total	Goldie total
1	3 April 1965	Isis	18:45	7 lengths	1	0
2	26 March 1966	Isis	19:22	7 lengths	2	0
3	25 March 1967	Goldie	19:11	2 lengths	2	1
4	30 March 1968	Goldie	18:44	5 1/2 lengths	2	2
5	5 April 1969	Goldie	18:50	2 lengths	2	3
6	28 March 1970	Goldie	19:58	14 lengths	2	4
7	27 March 1971	Goldie	18:37	15 lengths	2	5
8	1 April 1972	Goldie	19:19	2 1/2 lengths	2	6
9	7 March 1973	Goldie	19:13	5 lengths	2	7
10	6 April 1974	Goldie	17:51	4 lengths	2	8
11	29 March 1975	Isis	21:16	9 1/2 lengths	3	8
12	20 March 1976	Isis	17:34	2 1/2 lengths	4	8
13	19 March 1977	Goldie	19:35	7 lengths	4	9
14	25 March 1978	Goldie	19:37	1 1/4 lengths	4	10
15	17 March 1979	Goldie	22:50	12 lengths	4	11
16	5 April 1980	Isis	19:03	5 lengths	5	11
17	4 April 1981	Isis	19:01	4 1/2 lengths	6	11
18	27 March 1982	Isis	18:43	1 1/2 lengths	7	11
19	2 April 1983	Isis	19:27	6 1/2 lengths	8	11
20	18 March 1984	Goldie	17:37	2 3/4 lengths	8	12
21	6 April 1985	Isis	17:34	6 lengths	9	12
22	29 March 1986	Isis	18:48	3 1/4 lengths	10	12
23	28 March 1987	Goldie	20:30	1 length	10	13
24	2 April 1988	Goldie	17:55	5 1/2 lengths	10	14
25	25 March 1989	Isis	18:34	1 1/4 lengths	11	14
26	31 March 1990	Goldie	No time	Isis disqualified^{[a]}	11	15
27	30 March 1991	Goldie	17:38	4 lengths	11	16
28	4 April 1992	Goldie	17:44	3 1/4 lengths	11	17
29	27 March 1993	Goldie	17:05	9 lengths	11	18
30	26 March 1994	Goldie	18:27	13 lengths	11	19
31	1 April 1995	Goldie	18:29	14 lengths	11	20
32	6 April 1996	Goldie	17:02	11 lengths	11	21
33	29 March 1997	Goldie	17:32	6 1/2 lengths	11	22
34	28 March 1998	Isis	17:02	2 1/2 lengths	12	22
35	3 April 1999	Goldie	16:58	1 1/2 lengths	12	23
36	25 March 2000	Isis	17:37	5 lengths	13	23
37	24 March 2001	Goldie	19:36	6 lengths	13	24
38	30 March 2002	Isis	17:27	2 1/4 lengths	14	24
39	6 April 2003	Goldie	18:05	3 1/2 lengths	14	25
40	28 March 2004	Isis	18:42	1 1/2 lengths	15	25
41	27 March 2005	Goldie	16:48	5 lengths	15	26
42	2 April 2006	Goldie	19:10	4 1/4 lengths	15	27
43	7 April 2007	Goldie	17:48	4 lengths	15	28
44	29 March 2008	Isis	20:43	3 1/4 lengths	16	28
45	29 March 2009	Isis	17:24	4 lengths	17	28
46	3 April 2010	Goldie	18:03	2 lengths	17	29
47	26 March 2011	Isis	17:38	6 lengths	18	29
48	7 April 2012	Isis	16:41	5 lengths	19	29
49	31 March 2013	Isis	17:51	1/3 length	20	29
50	6 April 2014	Isis	18:39	13 lengths	21	29
51	11 April 2015	Isis	18:11	3 lengths	22	29
52	27 March 2016	Isis	18:55	2 lengths	23	29
53	2 April 2017	Isis	17:17	2 1/2 lengths	24	29
54	24 March 2018	Goldie	18:12	2 1/2 lengths	24	30
55	7 April 2019	Goldie	17:17	1 length	24	31
n/a	29 March 2020	Race cancelled due to the COVID-19 pandemic			24	31
56	25 April 2021	Goldie		6 lengths	24	32
57	3 April 2022	Isis	17:04	3 1/2 lengths	25	32
58	26 March 2023	Goldie	18:23	1 length	25	33
59	30 March 2024	Goldie	19:22	4 lengths	25	34
60	13 April 2025	Goldie	17:17	4 1/2 lengths	25	35
61	4 April 2026	Goldie	TBC	19 lengths	25	36

a. When the crews were approaching Barnes Bridge, Isis were leading by about 3/4 length. Umpire John Garrett had warned Isis for being out of their water, when a further blade clash resulted in the Goldie no. 2 breaking his swivel. Garrett then disqualified Isis.

== See also ==
- Women's Boat Race
