= The Boat Race 1881 =

38th Boat Race
- Date: 8 April 1881
- Winner: Oxford
- Margin of victory: 3 lengths
- Winning time: 21 minutes 51 seconds
- Overall record (Cambridge–Oxford): 17–20
- Umpire: Robert Lewis-Lloyd (Cambridge)

The 38th Boat Race, an annual side-by-side rowing race between crews from the Universities of Oxford and Cambridge along the River Thames, took place on 8 April 1881. In a race umpired by Robert Lewis-Lloyd, Oxford won by a margin of three lengths in a time of 21 minutes 51 seconds taking the overall record to 20–17 in their favour.

== Background ==
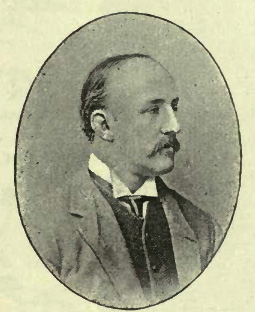
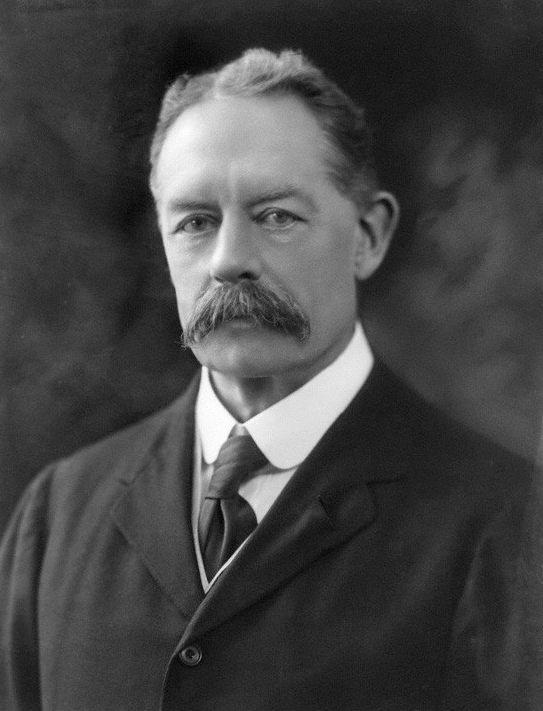
Charles Gurdon (left) coached Cambridge, while William Grenfell (right) coached Oxford. They had rowed against one another in the 1878 race.

The Boat Race is an annual rowing eight competition between the University of Oxford and the University of Cambridge. First held in 1829, the competition is a 4.2-mile (6.8 km) race along The Championship Course on the River Thames in southwest London. The rivalry is a major point of honour between the two universities and followed throughout the United Kingdom and worldwide. Oxford went into the race as reigning champions, having won the previous year's race by 3 3/4 lengths, and held the overall lead, with 19 victories to Cambridge's 17 (excluding the "dead heat" of 1877).

Cambridge were coached by Constantine William Benson (who rowed for Cambridge in the 1872, 1873 and 1875 races), Charles Gurdon (a Blue four times from 1876 to 1879), Thomas Edmund Hockin (also rowed four times from 1876 to 1879) and Edward Henry Prest (who represented Cambridge in the 1878, 1879 and 1880 races). Oxford's coaches were S. D. Darbishire (who rowed for Oxford in the 1868, 1869 and 1870 races), William Grenfell (who rowed in 1877 and 1879, and was non-rowing boat club president in 1879), H. B. Southwell (a Blue three times from 1878 to 1880) and W. B. Woodgate (who rowed twice, in the 1862 and 1863 races). The umpire for the race was Robert Lewis-Lloyd (who had rowed for Cambridge four times between 1856 and 1859) and the starter was Edward Searle.

The night before the race, an anniversary dinner was held to belatedly commemorate the fiftieth anniversary of the event.

== Crews ==
The Oxford crew weighed an average of 11 st 11.75 lb (75.0 kg), 2 pounds (0.9 kg) more than their opponents. Cambridge's crew included two former Blues, with Humphrey Sandford making his third appearance in the event. Oxford saw five rowers with Boat Race experience return, including J. H. T. Wharton who was rowing for a third time.

Seat	Oxford			Cambridge		
Seat	Name	College	Weight	Name	College	Weight
Bow	R. H. J. Poole	Brasenose	10 st 11 lb	R. C. M. G. Gridley	3rd Trinity	10 st 7 lb
2	R. A. Pickney	Exeter	11 st 3 lb	H. Sandford	Lady Margaret Boat Club	11 st 10.5 lb
3	A. R. Paterson	Trinity	12 st 7 lb	J. A. Watson-Taylor (P)	Magdalene	12 st 3.5 lb
4	E. Buck	Hertford	11 st 11 lb	P. W. Atkin	Jesus	11 st 13 lb
5	R. S. Kindersley (P)	Exeter	13 st 3 lb	E. Lambert	Pembroke	12 st 0 lb
6	D. E. Brown	Hertford	12 st 7 lb	A. M. Hutchinson	Jesus	11 st 13 lb
7	J. H. T. Wharton	Magdalen	11 st 10 lb	C. W. Moore	Christ's	11 st 9 lb
Stroke	L. R. West	Christ Church	11 st 0.5 lb	E. C. Brooksbank	Trinity Hall	11 st 8 lb
Cox	E. H. Lyon	Hertford	7 st 0 lb	H. W. Woodhouse	Trinity Hall	7 st 2 lb
Source: (P) – boat club president

== Race ==
The Championship Course, along which the race is conducted

On the day of the race, Oxford's number six David Edward Brown was ill – author and rower George Drinkwater suggested that "it was necessary for West [Oxford's stroke] to nurse him as much as possible." Oxford won the toss and elected to start from the Middlesex station, handing the Surrey side of the river to Cambridge. In a cold north-easterly wind, the race commenced at 8.24 a.m. with the Dark Blues outrating Cambridge and taking an early lead. Taking advantage of the favourable bend in the river, Oxford were half-a-length ahead by the Crab Tree pub.

Cambridge began to reduce the deficit as Oxford decreased their stroke rate, and by Harrods Furniture Depository the crews were nearly level. Although the bend of the river now was in favour of Cambridge, Oxford increased their rating once again and by Hammersmith Bridge held a three-quarter-length lead. They held off spurts from the Light Blues along Chiswick Reach and by Chiswick Eyot were clear. A two-length lead at Barnes Railway Bridge was increased to three by the time Oxford passed the finishing post, winning in a time of 21 minutes 51 seconds. It was Oxford's second consecutive victory and took the overall record to 20–17 in their favour.
