= The Boat Race 1876 =

33rd Boat Race
- Date: 8 April 1876
- Winner: Cambridge
- Margin of victory: "Easily"
- Winning time: 20 minutes 20 seconds
- Overall record (Cambridge–Oxford): 16–17
- Umpire: Joseph William Chitty (Oxford)

The 33rd Boat Race between crews from the University of Oxford and the University of Cambridge took place on the River Thames on 8 April 1876. Six of the Oxford crew had Boat Race experience while Cambridge's crew contained three Blues. Umpired by Joseph William Chitty, Cambridge won the race "easily" in a time of 20 minutes 20 seconds, following confusion as to the positioning of the finish. The victory took the overall record to 17–16 in Oxford's favour.

== Background ==
The Boat Race is a side-by-side rowing competition between the University of Oxford (sometimes referred to as the "Dark Blues") and the University of Cambridge (sometimes referred to as the "Light Blues"). The race was first held in 1829, and since 1845 has taken place on the 4.2-mile (6.8 km) Championship Course on the River Thames in southwest London. Oxford went into the race as reigning champions, having defeated Cambridge by ten lengths in the previous year's race, and led overall with seventeen wins to Cambridge's fifteen.

Cambridge were coached by Constantine William Benson who had rowed for Cambridge in the 1872, 1873 and 1875 races, and James Brooks Close who had represented the Light Blues in the 1872, 1873 and 1874 races. There is no record of who coached Oxford. Joseph William Chitty was the umpire for the race. He had rowed for Oxford twice in 1849 (in March and December) and the 1852 race. The starter was Edward Searle.

== Crews ==
Both crews weight an average of 11 st 13.875 lb (76.0 kg). The Cambridge crew contained three former Blues: William Brooks Close, cox George Latham Davies and Herbert Rhodes (rowing in his fourth Boat Race). Oxford saw six Blues return, including H. J. Stayner who was making his third Boat Race appearance. Author and rower G. C. Drinkwater stated that the placement of Tom Edwards-Moss, described as "one of the best sevens that ever rowed", at stroke was a mistake. In contrast, Cambridge were "considered by many to be the finest seen at Putney up to that time."

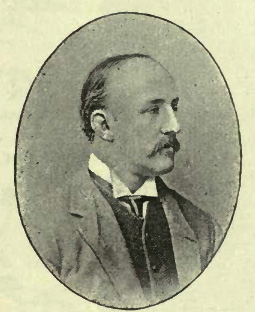
Charles Gurdon rowed at number four for Cambridge.

Seat	Cambridge			Oxford		
Seat	Name	College	Weight	Name	College	Weight
Bow	P. W. Brancker	Jesus	11 st 3.5 lb	H. M'd Courtney	Pembroke	11 st 2 lb
2	T. W. Lewis	Gonville and Caius	11 st 8 lb	F. R. Mercer	Corpus Christi	11 st 6.5 lb
3	W. B. Close (P)	1st Trinity	11 st 8 lb	W. H. Hobart	Exeter	11 st 11 lb
4	C. Gurdon	Jesus	12 st 9.75 lb	A. M. Mitchison	Pembroke	13 st 0 lb
5	L. G. Pike	Gonville and Caius	12 st 9 lb	J. M. Boustead	University	12 st 6 lb
6	T. E. Hockin	Jesus	12 st 8 lb	H. J. Stayner (P)	St John's	12 st 2.5 lb
7	H. E. Rhodes	Jesus	11 st 13 lb	H. P. Marriott	Brasenose	11 st 9.5 lb
Stroke	C. D. Shafto	Jesus	11 st 9.5 lb	T. C. Edwards-Moss	Brasenose	12 st 3.25 lb
Cox	G. L. Davis	Clare	6 st 13 lb	W. D. Craven	Worcester	7 st 6.5 lb
Source: (P) – boat club president

== Race ==
The Championship Course, along which the race is conducted

Oxford won the toss and elected to start from the Middlesex station, handing the Surrey side of the river to Cambridge. Weather conditions were warm but with a "foul wind" in Corney Reach (about 3 miles (4.8 km) along the course), and the race commenced at 2:02 p.m. The crews remained almost level for the first four minutes of the race, after which Cambridge began to pull ahead. By Hammersmith Bridge they had a clear water advantage and were three lengths up by Chiswick Eyot. Extending their lead, the Light Blues were five lengths ahead by The Ship pub. When Oxford finally passed the pub, they stopped, "apparently unaware that they had not completed the course". Author and former Oxford rower Dickie Burnell suggested the course was approximately 60 yards (55 m) too long.

Cambridge, having sprinted to the finish, received the finishing gun while eight lengths ahead. As a result of the confusion, the judge declared the winning distance as four lengths. However, official records state that Cambridge won the race "easily", in a time of 20 minutes 20 seconds. It was their sixth win in seven years and took the overall record to 17–16 in Oxford's favour.
