= The Boat Race 1879 =

36th Boat Race
- Date: 5 April 1879
- Winner: Cambridge
- Margin of victory: 3 lengths
- Winning time: 21 minutes 18 seconds
- Overall record (Cambridge–Oxford): 17–18
- Umpire: Joseph William Chitty (Oxford)

The 36th Boat Race took place on 5 April 1879. The Boat Race is an annual side-by-side rowing race between crews from the Universities of Oxford and Cambridge along the River Thames. Each crew contained four Blues. In a race umpired by former Oxford rower Joseph William Chitty, Cambridge led all the way, and won by a margin of three lengths in a time of 21 minutes 18 seconds. The victory took the overall record to 18–17 in Oxford's favour.

== Background ==
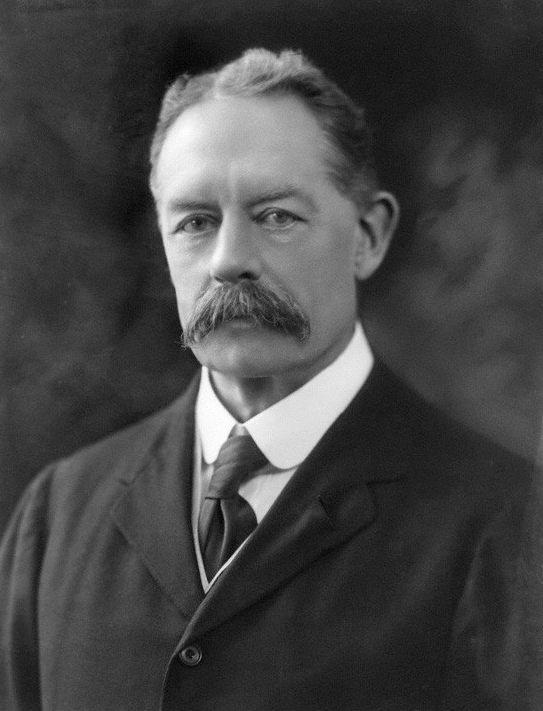
William Grenfell coached the Oxford crew.

The Boat Race is a side-by-side rowing competition between the University of Oxford (sometimes referred to as the "Dark Blues") and the University of Cambridge (sometimes referred to as the "Light Blues"). The race was first held in 1829, and since 1845 has taken place on the 4.2-mile (6.8 km) Championship Course on the River Thames in southwest London. Cambridge went into the race as reigning champions, having won the previous year's race by ten lengths. However Oxford held the overall lead, with 18 victories to Cambridge's 16 (excluding the "dead heat" of 1877).

Cambridge's coaches were James Brooks Close (who rowed for the Light Blues in the 1872, 1873 and 1874 races), Herbert Edward Rhodes (who took part in four races between 1873 and 1876) and Robert John Spurrell (a Blue in 1878). Oxford were coached by William Grenfell (who had rowed for the Dark Blues in 1877 and was the non-rowing president of Oxford University Boat Club).

The race was umpired by Joseph William Chitty who had rowed for Oxford twice in 1849 (in the March and December races) and the 1852 race, while the starter was Edward Searle.

== Crews ==
The Cambridge crew weighed an average of 12 st 0.5 lb (76.2 kg), 0.75 pounds (0.3 kg) more than their opponents. Oxford's crew contained four former Blues, including H. P. Marriott who was rowing in his fifth consecutive Boat Race. Similarly, Cambridge saw four Blues return to their crew, including cox George Latham Davies who was steering the Light Blue boat for the fifth time. Rower and author George Drinkwater stated that "neither of the crews this year was up to the high standard of the winning crews in the past few years".

The Cambridge crew included the only non-British participant in the race, Australian rower Charles Fairbairn. He was born in Victoria and was educated at Geelong Grammar School before matriculating at Jesus College.

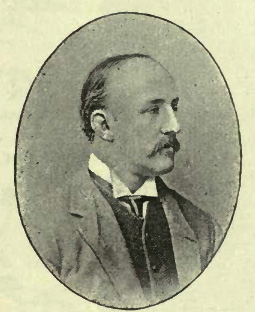
Charles Gurdon rowed at number four for Cambridge.

Seat	Oxford			Cambridge		
Seat	Name	College	Weight	Name	College	Weight
Bow	J. H. T. Wharton	Magdalen	11 st 4 lb	E. H. Prest (P)	Jesus	11 st 0 lb
2	H. M. Robinson	New College	11 st 1 lb	H. Sandford	Lady Margaret Boat Club	11 st 7 lb
3	H. W. Disney	Hertford	12 st 5.5 lb	A. H. S. Bird	1st Trinity	11 st 8 lb
4	H. B. Southwell	Pembroke	12 st 9 lb	C. Gurdon	Jesus	13 st 2 lb
5	T. C. Burrowes	Trinity	12 st 9 lb	T. E. Hockin	Jesus	12 st 1 lb
6	G. D. Rowe	University	11 st 12 lb	C. Fairbairn	Jesus	12 st 4 lb
7	W. H. Hobart	Exeter	11 st 11 lb	T. Routledge	Emmanuel	12 st 6 lb
Stroke	H. P. Marriott	Brasenose	12 st 3 lb	R. D. Davis	1st Trinity	12 st 4 lb
Cox	F. M. Beaumont	New College	7 st 4 lb	G. L. Davis	Clare	7 st 7 lb
Source: (P) – boat club president (William Grenfell was Oxford's non-rowing president)

== Race ==
The Championship Course, along which the race is conducted

Oxford won the toss and elected to start from the Surrey station, handing the Middlesex side of the river to Cambridge. Cambridge made the better start and were clear of Oxford within the first 90 seconds of the race. Despite a lower stroke rate, the Light Blues had extended their lead to three lengths by Hammersmith Bridge. Encountering rough water in Corney Reach, Cambridge slowed and allowed Oxford to gain on them, but as the crews passed under Barnes Bridge into smoother water, the Light Blues reasserted their dominance. They passed the finishing post three lengths ahead in a time of 21 minutes 18 seconds. It was Cambridge's first victory since the 1876 race, and their seventh in the last ten races, taking the overall record to 18–17 in Oxford's favour.
