= The Boat Race 1875 =

32nd Boat Race
- Date: 20 March 1875
- Winner: Oxford
- Margin of victory: 10 lengths
- Winning time: 22 minutes 2 seconds
- Overall record (Cambridge–Oxford): 15–17
- Umpire: Joseph William Chitty (Oxford)

The 32nd Boat Race between crews from the University of Oxford and the University of Cambridge took place on the River Thames on 20 March 1875. The Cambridge crew contained four Blues to Oxford's two, the latter went into the race without a win since the 1869 race. In a race umpired by Joseph William Chitty, Oxford won by ten lengths in a time of 22 minutes 2 seconds, taking the overall record in the event to 17–15 in their favour. One of the Cambridge crew broke his slide during the race.

== Background ==
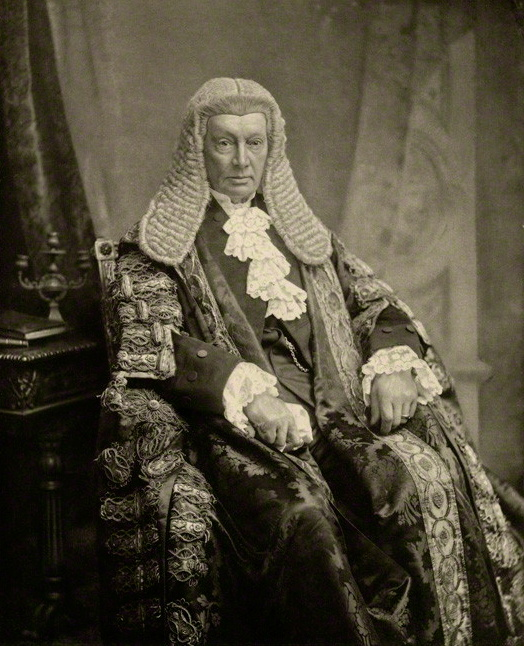
Joseph William Chitty was the umpire for the 1875 Boat Race.

The Boat Race is a side-by-side rowing competition between the University of Oxford (sometimes referred to as the "Dark Blues") and the University of Cambridge (sometimes referred to as the "Light Blues"). The race was first held in 1829, and since 1845 has taken place on the 4.2-mile (6.8 km) Championship Course on the River Thames in southwest London. Cambridge went into the race as reigning champions, having defeated Oxford by 3 1/2 lengths in the previous year's race, while Oxford led overall with sixteen wins to Cambridge's fifteen.

Cambridge were coached by John Goldie, the Cambridge boat club president and rower for the 1869, 1870 and 1871 races, and Charles Stokes Read who had rowed for Cambridge in the previous three races. Oxford's coaches were S. D. Darbishire who had rowed for the Dark Blues in the 1868, 1869 and 1870 races, F. H. Hall who had coxed for three races between 1870 and 1872, Robert Wells Risley who had rowed four times between the 1857 and 1860 races, Edmund Warre (represented Oxford in 1857 and 1858), Frank Willan (four-time winning rower between 1866 and 1869) and Walter Bradford Woodgate who had rowed in the 1862 and 1863 races. Joseph William Chitty was the umpire for the race. He had rowed for Oxford twice in 1849 (in March and December) and the 1852 race. The starter was Edward Searle.

== Crews ==
The Oxford crew weighed an average of 11 st 12.375 lb (75.3 kg), 1.625 pounds (0.7 kg) more than their opponents. Cambridge's crew contained four former Blues, including Herbert Edward Rhodes who was making his third appearance in the race. Oxford saw two rowers return from the 1874 race, in H. J. Stayner and J. P. Way. According to Drinkwater, the Oxford University Boat Club towards the end of 1874 produced a "fine crew", and of particular note was the inclusion of the former Eton Captain of the Boats Tom Edwards-Moss. In contrast, Cambridge's crew, with just two returning from the previous year's race, was completed with "material ... not of a very high order".

Seat	Cambridge			Oxford		
Seat	Name	College	Weight	Name	College	Weight
Bow	P. J. Hibbert	Lady Margaret Boat Club	11 st 2 lb	H. M'd Courtney	Pembroke	10 st 13 lb
2	W. B. Close	1st Trinity	11 st 10 lb	H. P. Marriott	Brasenose	11 st 13 lb
3	G. C. Dicker	1st Trinity	11 st 7.5 lb	J. E. Banks	University	11 st 11 lb
4	W. G. Michell	1st Trinity	11 st 12 lb	A. M. Mitchison	Pembroke	12 st 10 lb
5	E. A. Phillips	Jesus	12 st 5 lb	H. J. Stayner (P)	St John's	12 st 2 lb
6	J. A. Aylmer	1st Trinity	12 st 10 lb	J. M. Boustead	University	12 st 3 lb
7	C. W. Benson	3rd Trinity	11 st 6 lb	T. C. Edwards-Moss	Brasenose	12 st 5 lb
Stroke	H. E. Rhodes (P)	Jesus	11 st 8 lb	J. P. Way	Brasenose	10 st 12 lb
Cox	G. L. Davis	Clare	6 st 10 lb	E. O. Hopwood	Christ Church	8 st 3 lb
Source: (P) – boat club president

== Race ==
The Championship Course, along which the race is conducted

Oxford were considered clear pre-race favourites to win their first Boat Race in five years; conditions were inclement with a "nasty north-west wind" but a "fair tide". They lost the toss and Cambridge elected to start from the Middlesex station, handing Oxford the Surrey side of the river. The race commenced at 1:13 p.m., and Cambridge made the better start, taking the lead from the outset with a higher stroke rate. Half a length ahead after a minute, the Light Blues nearly had a clear water advantage but tired in the strong headwind, and started to be caught by Craven Steps, around 1,000 yards (910 m) along the course. About a mile into the race, one of the Cambridge crew broke a slide.

The crews were level at the Crab Tree pub and by Hammersmith Bridge, and with the advantage of the bend in the river, Oxford were clear and went on to win by ten lengths in a time of 22 minutes 2 seconds. It was their first victory since 1869 and took the overall record in the event to 17–15 in their favour.
