= The Boat Race 1878 =

35th Boat Race
- Date: 13 April 1878
- Winner: Oxford
- Margin of victory: 10 lengths
- Winning time: 22 minutes 15 seconds
- Overall record (Cambridge–Oxford): 16–18
- Umpire: Joseph William Chitty (Oxford)

The 35th Boat Race took place on 13 April 1878. The Boat Race is an annual side-by-side rowing race between crews from the Universities of Oxford and Cambridge along the River Thames. In total, ten former Blues took part in the contest. The race was umpired by former rower Joseph William Chitty and Oxford won by a margin of 10 lengths in a time of 22 minutes 15 seconds. The victory took the overall record to 18–16 in Oxford's favour.

== Background ==
The Boat Race is a side-by-side rowing competition between the University of Oxford (sometimes referred to as the "Dark Blues") and the University of Cambridge (sometimes referred to as the "Light Blues"). First held in 1829, the race takes place on the 4.2 miles (6.8 km) Championship Course on the River Thames in southwest London. The rivalry is a major point of honour between the two universities; it is followed throughout the United Kingdom and as of 2014, broadcast worldwide. Neither crew went into the race as reigning champions – the previous year's race had been declared a "dead heat". However Oxford held the overall lead, with 17 victories to Cambridge's 16.

Cambridge's coach was James Brooks Close (who rowed for the Light Blues in the 1872, 1873 and 1874 races). Oxford were coached by William Grenfell (who had rowed for the Dark Blues the previous year and was rowing at number four in 1878), A. J. Mulholland (who rowed in 1877) and Edmund Warre (who represented the Oxford in the 1857 and the 1858 races).

The race was umpired by Joseph William Chitty who had rowed for Oxford twice in 1849 (in the March and December races) and the 1852 race, while the starter was Edward Searle and the finishing judge was E. H. Fairrie.

== Crews ==
The Oxford crew weighed an average of 12 st 3.675 lb (77.7 kg), 6.875 pounds (3.1 kg) more than their opponents. Cambridge saw four former Blues return, including the cox George Latham Davies who was taking part in his fourth consecutive Boat Race. Oxford's crew included six individuals with experience of the race, with boat club president Tom Edwards-Moss making his fourth appearance in the event. Drinkwater suggested that the Oxford crew was the "best ... up to that date".

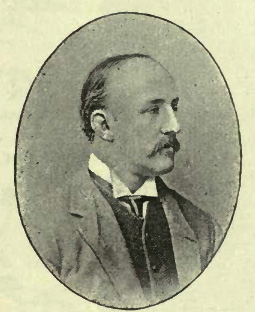
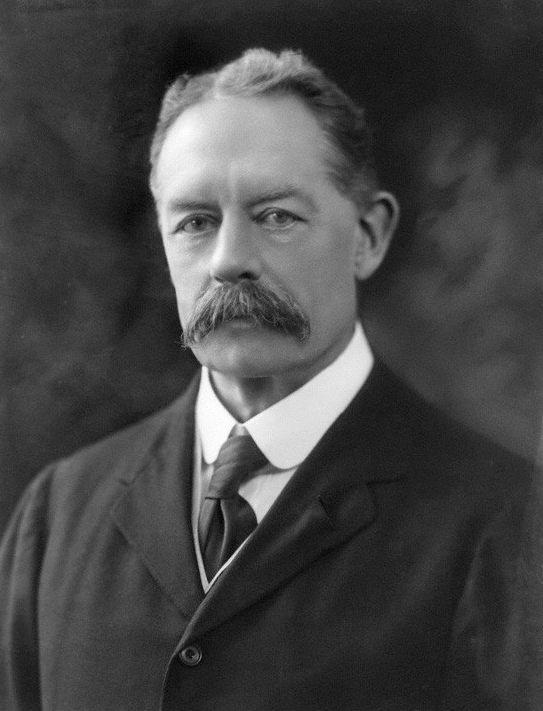
Charles Gurdon (left), Cambridge University Boat Club president at the time, rowed at number six for Cambridge, while William Grenfell (right) occupied the four seat for Oxford.

Seat	Oxford			Cambridge		
Seat	Name	College	Weight	Name	College	Weight
Bow	W. A. Ellison	University	10 st 13 lb	Ll. R. Jones	Jesus	10 st 9 lb
2	D. J. Cowles	St John's	11 st 5 lb	J. A. Watson-Taylor	Magdalene	11 st 9.75 lb
3	H. B. Southwell	Pembroke	12 st 8.5 lb	T. W. Barker	1st Trinity	12 st 6 lb
4	W. H. Grenfell	Balliol	12 st 10.5 lb	R. J. Spurrell	Trinity Hall	11 st 13.5 lb
5	H. Pelham	Magdalen	12 st 11 lb	L. G. Pike	Gonville & Caius	12 st 8.5 lb
6	G. F. Burgess	Keble	13 st 3.5 lb	C. Gurdon (P)	Jesus	12 st 10.5 lb
7	T. C. Edwards-Moss (P)	Brasenose	12 st 3 lb	T. E. Hockin	Jesus	12 st 4.5 lb
Stroke	H. P. Marriott	Brasenose	12 st 2.5 lb	E. H. Prest	Jesus	10 st 12.75 lb
Cox	F. M. Beaumont	New College	7 st 0.5 lb	G. L. Davis	Clare	7 st 5 lb
Source: (P) – boat club president

== Race ==
The Championship Course, along which the race is conducted

Oxford won the toss and elected to start from the Surrey station, handing the Middlesex side of the river to Cambridge. The race commenced at 10.15 a.m. Out-rating Oxford by four strokes per minute, Cambridge took an early lead and were half a length ahead after the first minute. They held the lead round the bend which favoured them but as the river curved to favour Oxford, the Dark Blues quickly overtook, even with the slower stroke rate. They were at least half-a-length clear at the Crab Tree pub which they had extended to four lengths by Hammersmith Bridge. Oxford won by 40 seconds (approximately 10 lengths) in a time of 22 minutes and 15 seconds, their second victory in nine years, which took the overall record to 18–16 in their favour.
