= Herbert Rhodes =

English cricketer (1852–1889)

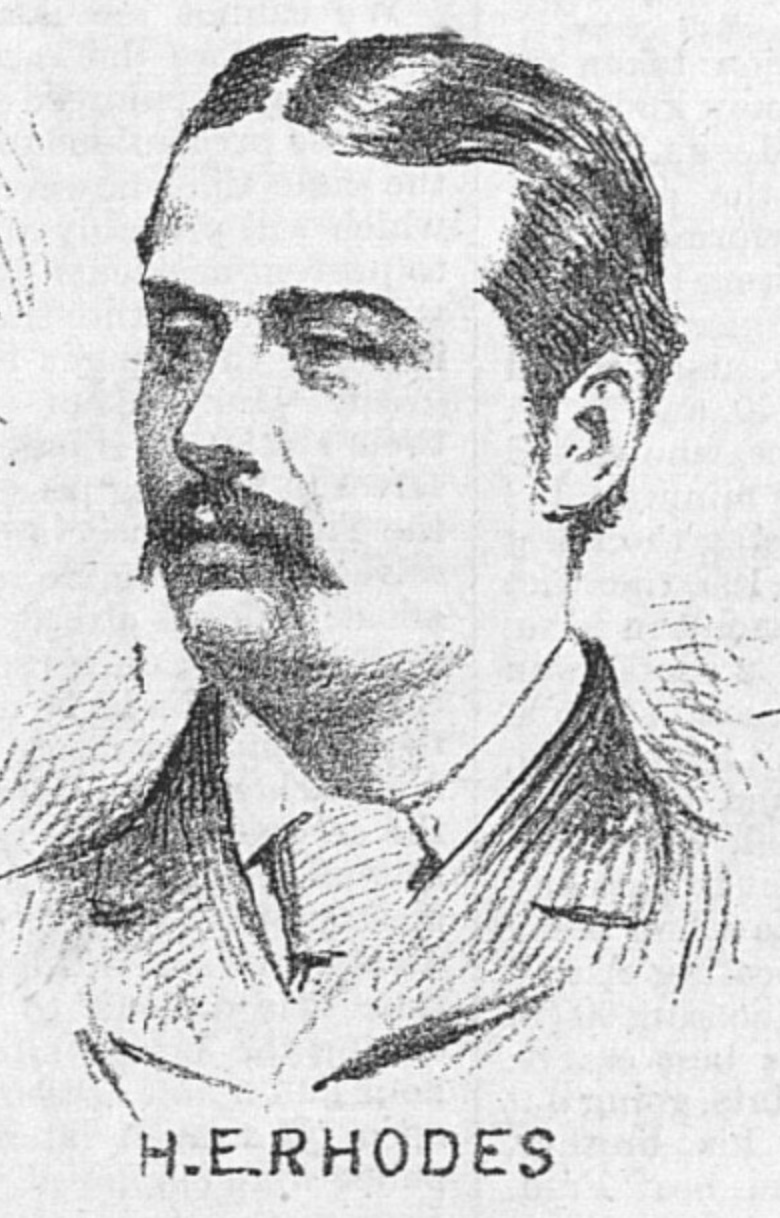

Herbert Edward Rhodes (11 January 1852 – 10 September 1889) was an English amateur first-class cricketer, who played ten first-class matches for Yorkshire County Cricket Club from 1878 to 1883, and twenty five matches overall for teams including the Marylebone Cricket Club (MCC) (1878–1883), England XI (1879), A.W. Ridley's XI (1879), Gentlemen of England (1881–1882) and Orleans Club (1883).

Born at Hennerton House at Wargrave in Berkshire, England, Rhodes was educated at Eton, and went up to Jesus College, Cambridge. He did not play in any first-class cricket while at university, but he was the stroke of the Cambridge boat in the 1873, 1874 and 1875 races and he rowed at number seven in the 1876 race.

He was a right-handed batsman and wicket-keeper, who took fourteen catches and completed two stumpings in first-class cricket. He scored 424 runs at 11.45, with a best score of 64 against I Zingari. He was selected to tour India with Vernon's team in the winter of 1889/90. However, just before he was due to leave he suffered a fatal accident when he fell from a hotel balcony in Dover.
