= The Boat Race 1874 =

31st Boat Race
- Date: 28 March 1874
- Winner: Cambridge
- Margin of victory: 3 1/2 lengths
- Winning time: 22 minutes 35 seconds
- Overall record (Cambridge–Oxford): 15–16
- Umpire: Joseph William Chitty (Oxford)

The 31st Boat Race took place on the 28 March 1874. The Boat Race is an annual side-by-side rowing race between crews from the Universities of Oxford and Cambridge along the River Thames. In a race umpired by former Oxford rower Joseph William Chitty, Cambridge won by three and a half lengths in their fifth consecutive victory.

== Background ==
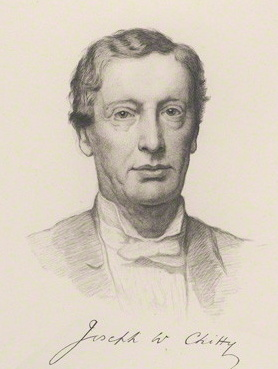
Joseph William Chitty was the umpire for the 1874 Boat Race.

The Boat Race is a side-by-side rowing competition between the University of Oxford (sometimes referred to as the "Dark Blues") and the University of Cambridge (sometimes referred to as the "Light Blues"). The race was first held in 1829, and since 1845 has taken place on the 4.2-mile (6.8 km) Championship Course on the River Thames in southwest London. Cambridge went into the race as reigning champions, having defeated Oxford by three lengths in the previous year's race, while Oxford led overall with sixteen wins to Cambridge's fourteen.

Cambridge were coached by John Graham Chambers (who rowed for Cambridge in the 1862 and 1863 races, and was non-rowing boat club president for the 1865 race), William Henry Lowe (who rowed for Cambridge in the 1868, 1870 and 1871 races) and John Goldie (the Cambridge boat club president and rower for the 1869, 1870 and 1871 races). Oxford's coach was S. D. Darbishire (who rowed for the Dark Blues in 1868, 1869 and 1870).

Cambridge opted not to use the boat built for them by Harry Clasper specifically for the race, in favour of one constructed by Waites which had been used by 1st Trinity Boat Club. The race was umpired by Joseph William Chitty who had rowed for Oxford twice in 1849 (in the March and December races) and the 1852 race, while the starter was Edward Searle.

== Crews ==
The Cambridge crew weighed an average of 11 st 10.625 lb (74.5 kg), 1.5 pounds (0.7 kg) more than their opponents. Oxford saw the return of two former Blues in William Edward Sherwood and A. W. Nicholson (who was rowing in his third Boat Race). Cambridge's crew included five Blues, with James Brooks Close and Charles Stokes Read returning for a third time.

The Light Blue crew included Australian George Francis Armytage, the only non-British participant in the race, who had been educated at Geelong Grammar School. Author and former Oxford rower G. C. Drinkwater described the Oxford crew as "something of a disappointment" while declaring that Cambridge were "a very fine crew".

Seat	Cambridge			Oxford		
Seat	Name	College	Weight	Name	College	Weight
Bow	P. J. Hibbert	Lady Margaret Boat Club	11 st 0 lb	H. W. Benson	Brasenose	11 st 0 lb
2	G. F. Armytage	Jesus	11 st 6 lb	J. S. Sinclair	Oriel	11 st 5.5 lb
3	J. B. Close (P)	1st Trinity	10 st 13 lb	W. E. Sherwood	Christ Church	11 st 8 lb
4	A. S. Estcourt	Trinity Hall	11 st 8 lb	A. R. Harding	Merton	11 st 1.5 lb
5	W. C. Lecky-Browne	Jesus	12 st 3 lb	J. Williams	Lincoln	13 st 0.5 lb
6	J. A. Aylmer	1st Trinity	12 st 10 lb	A. W. Nicholson (P)	Magdalen	12 st 10 lb
7	C. S. Read	1st Trinity	12 st 12 lb	H. J. Stayner	St John's	11 st 10.5 lb
Stroke	H. E. Rhodes	Jesus	11 st 5 lb	J. P. Way	Brasenose	10 st 9 lb
Cox	C. H. Candy	Gonville and Caius	7 st 7 lb	W. F. A. Lambert	Wadham	7 st 4 lb
Source: (P) – boat club president

== Race ==
The Championship Course, along which the race is conducted

Cambridge won the toss and elected to start from the Middlesex side of the river, handing the Surrey station to Oxford. The race started at 11.14 a.m. and was "rowed on an exceptionally sluggish tide". Cambridge made a good start and held a half-length lead at Hammersmith Bridge. As the bend of the river began to give advantage to the Surrey side, Oxford drew back into contention and the crews were level at the bottom of Chiswick Reach. The position of moored barges provided a good course and smooth water for the Dark Blues who took a half-length lead.

Despite this, fatigue began to set in to the Oxford crew and Cambridge came back into contention. With a steady rhythm, the Light Blues were level at the Bathing Place of Athens and held a clear water advantage by The Bull's Head pub. A length ahead by Barnes Bridge, Cambridge pulled further ahead to win by 3 1/2 lengths in a time of 22 minutes 35 seconds. It was Cambridge's fifth consecutive victory and took the overall record to 16–15 in favour of Oxford.
