= The Boat Race 1871 =

1871 boat race between Oxford and Cambridge universities

28th Boat Race
- Date: 1 April 1871
- Winner: Cambridge
- Margin of victory: 1 length
- Winning time: 23 minutes 10 seconds
- Overall record (Cambridge–Oxford): 12–16
- Umpire: Joseph William Chitty (Oxford)

The 28th Boat Race between crews from the University of Oxford and the University of Cambridge took place on the River Thames on the 1 April 1871. The race, umpired by Joseph William Chitty, was won by Cambridge by one length in a time of 23 minutes 10 seconds for their second consecutive victory.

== Background ==
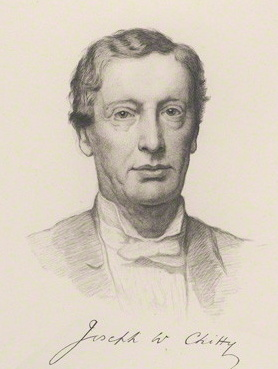
Joseph William Chitty was the umpire for the 1871 Boat Race.

The Boat Race is a side-by-side rowing competition between the University of Oxford (sometimes referred to as the "Dark Blues") and the University of Cambridge (sometimes referred to as the "Light Blues"). The race was first held in 1829, and since 1845 has taken place on the 4.2-mile (6.8 km) Championship Course on the River Thames in southwest London. Cambridge went into the race as reigning champions, having defeated Oxford by three lengths in the previous year's race, while Oxford led overall with sixteen wins to Cambridge's eleven.

Oxford were coached by W. D. Benson (their non-rowing president, who had rowed three times for the Dark Blues in the 1868, 1869 and 1870 races). Cambridge's coach was John Graham Chambers (who rowed in the 1862 and 1863 race, and was a non-rowing president for the 1865 race) and John Hilton Ridley (who rowed in the 1869 and 1870 races).

The race was umpired by Joseph William Chitty who had rowed for Oxford twice in 1849 (in the March and December races) and the 1852 race, while the starter was Edward Searle.

== Crews ==
The Oxford crew weighed an average of 12 st 4.125 lb (76.1 kg), 2.75 pounds (1.2 kg) more than their opponents. The Cambridge crew saw only three new rowers, with five returning from the 1870 race, including the Cambridge University Boat Club president John Goldie and William Henry Lowe in their third appearance in the event, along with the cox Henry Erskine Gordon. Similarly, Oxford saw five of their crew return, including S. H. Woodhouse at bow and Thomas Southey Baker who were participating in their third Boat Races.

Seat	Cambridge			Oxford		
Seat	Name	College	Weight	Name	College	Weight
Bow	J. S. Follet	3rd Trinity	11 st 6.5 lb	S. H. Woodhouse	University	11 st 6.5 lb
2	John B. Close	1st Trinity	11 st 8 lb	E. Giles	Christ Church	11 st 13.5 lb
3	H. J. Lomax	1st Trinity	12 st 2 lb	T. S. Baker	Queen's	13 st 3.5 lb
4	E. A. A. Spencer	2nd Trinity	12 st 9 lb	E. C. Malan	Worcester	13 st 1 lb
5	W. H. Lowe	Christ's	12 st 10 lb	J. E. Edwards-Moss	Balliol	12 st 8.5 lb
6	E. L. Phelps	Sidney Sussex	12 st 1 lb	F. E. H. Payne	St John's	12 st 9.5 lb
7	E. S. L. Randolph	3rd Trinity	11 st 10 lb	J. M. Clintock-Bubury	Brasenose	11 st 8 lb
Stroke	J. H. D. Goldie (P)	Lady Margaret Boat Club	12 st 6.5 lb	R. Lesley	Pembroke	11 st 10.5 lb
Cox	H. E. Gordon	1st Trinity	7 st 13 lb	F. H. Hall	Corpus Christi	7 st 10.5 lb
Source: (P) – boat club president (W. D. Benson was Oxford's non-rowing president)

== Race ==
The Championship Course, along which the race is conducted

There was "little or no tide and head wind over part of the course" according to Drinkwater. Cambridge won the toss and elected to start from the Surrey station, handing the Middlesex station to Oxford. The umpire, Chitty, got the race underway at 10.08 a.m., with Cambridge taking an early lead. The Light Blues had a clear water advantage by the Point and held a two-length lead by the time the crews shot Hammersmith Bridge. Despite a spurt instigated by Oxford stroke Robert Lesley at Barnes Bridge, Goldie remained steady until, before the final twenty strokes, he increased the stroke rate and saw Cambridge home by one length in a time of 23 minutes 10 seconds for their second consecutive victory and took the overall record to 16–12 in Oxford's favour.
