= The Boat Race 1872 =

29th Boat Race
- Sketches at the Oxford and Cambridge Boat-Race (The Illustrated London News, 1872)
- Date: 27 March 1872
- Winner: Cambridge
- Margin of victory: 2 lengths
- Winning time: 21 minutes 15 seconds
- Overall record (Cambridge–Oxford): 13–16
- Umpire: Robert Lewis-Lloyd (Cambridge)

The 29th Boat Race took place on the 27 March 1872. The Boat Race is an annual side-by-side rowing race between crews from the Universities of Oxford and Cambridge along the River Thames. In a race umpired by Robert Lewis-Lloyd, Cambridge won by two lengths in a time of 21 minutes 15 seconds taking the overall record to 16–13 in Oxford's favour.

== Background ==
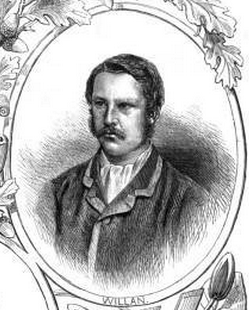
Former rower Frank Willan coached Oxford.

The Boat Race is a side-by-side rowing competition between the University of Oxford (sometimes referred to as the "Dark Blues") and the University of Cambridge (sometimes referred to as the "Light Blues"). The race was first held in 1829, and since 1845 has taken place on the 4.2-mile (6.8 km) Championship Course on the River Thames in southwest London. Cambridge went into the race as reigning champions, having defeated Oxford by one length in the previous year's race, while Oxford led overall with sixteen wins to Cambridge's twelve.

During the build-up to the race, Oxford's boat club president, Robert Lesley of Pembroke College, strained his side and was prohibited from practice. Worse still, four days before the race, the number two rower Armistead "broke down and was replaced by C. C. Knollys, also an untrained man". Conversely, Cambridge saw John Goldie return as president for the third consecutive year, and while all the previous year's Blues were available, four were selected for the race.

Oxford were coached by E. G. Banks of Worcester College and Frank Willan who had rowed for the Dark Blues four times between the 1866 and 1869 races. Cambridge's coaches were John Graham Chambers (who rowed for Cambridge in the 1862 and 1863 races, and was non-rowing boat club president for the 1865 race) and William Henry Lowe (who rowed in three times, in the 1868, 1870 and 1871 races).

While sliding seats had started to come to prominence, having been first used by a crew from Pembroke College, Goldie was reluctant to allow them to be tried for the race and disallowed the Light Blue boat manufacturer Harry Clasper from fitting them. The umpire for the race was Robert Lewis-Lloyd, the first time since The Boat Race 1856 that the event was not overseen by Joseph William Chitty. Lewis-Lloyd had rowed for Cambridge four times, between the 1856 and the 1859 races inclusively. Edward Searle once again performed the duties of the starter.

== Crews ==
The Cambridge crew weighed an average of 11 st 12.875 lb (75.6 kg), 2.375 pounds (1.1 kg) more than their opponents. Oxford's crew contained three rowers with Boat Race experience, and saw F. H. Hall return to cox the Dark Blue boat for the third time. Along with stroke and president Goldie, Cambridge's crew included Edmund Spencer and Edward Randolph (each rowing their third race), and John Brooks Close who had rowed in 1871.

Seat	Cambridge			Oxford		
Seat	Name	College	Weight	Name	College	Weight
Bow	James B. Close	1st Trinity	11 st 3 lb	J. A. Ornsby	Lincoln	10 st 13 lb
2	C. W. Benson	3rd Trinity	11 st 4 lb	C. C. Knollys	Magadalen	10 st 13 lb
3	G. M. Robinson	Christ's	11 st 12 lb	F. E. H. Payne	St John's	12 st 11 lb
4	E. A. A. Spencer	2nd Trinity	12 st 8.5 lb	A. W. Nicholson	Magdalen	12 st 1 lb
5	C. S. Read	1st Trinity	12 st 8 lb	E. C. Malan	Worcester	13 st 0 lb
6	John B. Close	1st Trinity	11 st 10 lb	R. S. Mitchison	Pembroke	12 st 1.5 lb
7	E. S. L. Randolph	3rd Trinity	11 st 11 lb	R. Lesley (P)	Pembroke	11 st 12 lb
Stroke	J. H. D. Goldie	Lady Margaret Boat Club	12 st 4.5 lb	T. H. Houblon	Christ Church	10 st 5 lb
Cox	C. H. Roberts	Jesus	6 st 6 lb	F. H. Hall	Corpus Christi	7 st 12 lb
Source: (P) – boat club president

== Race ==
The Championship Course, along which the race is conducted

The Oxford and Cambridge Boat-Race - Start (The Illustrated London News, 1872)

Cambridge won the toss and elected to start from the Middlesex station, handing the Surrey side of the river to Oxford. The race started at 1.35 p.m. "in the teeth of a bitter north-easterly gale and snow-storm", and proved uneventful with the Light Blues winning by two lengths in a time of 21 minutes 15 seconds. Partway through the race, Goldie had broken a bolt in his rigging; although he could no longer contribute to the power of the Light Blue boat, he continued to stroke and provide the required rhythm to lead Cambridge to the victory. It was Cambridge's third consecutive win and took the overall record to 16–13 in Oxford's favour.
