= The Boat Race 1873 =

30th Boat Race
- Date: 29 March 1873
- Winner: Cambridge
- Margin of victory: 3 lengths
- Winning time: 19 minutes 35 seconds
- Overall record (Cambridge–Oxford): 14–16
- Umpire: Joseph William Chitty (Oxford)

The 30th Boat Race took place on the 29 March 1873. The Boat Race is an annual side-by-side rowing race between crews from the Universities of Oxford and Cambridge along the River Thames. In a race umpired by former Oxford rower Joseph William Chitty, Cambridge won by three lengths in a time of 19 minutes and 35 seconds, the fastest time in the history of the event. It was the first time that rowers raced on sliding seats.

== Background ==
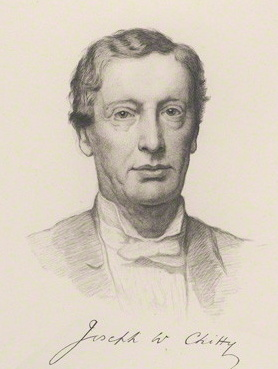
Joseph William Chitty was the umpire for the 1873 Boat Race.

The Boat Race is a side-by-side rowing competition between the University of Oxford (sometimes referred to as the "Dark Blues") and the University of Cambridge (sometimes referred to as the "Light Blues"). The race was first held in 1829, and since 1845 has taken place on the 4.2-mile (6.8 km) Championship Course on the River Thames in southwest London. Cambridge went into the race as reigning champions, having defeated Oxford by two lengths in the previous year's race, while Oxford led overall with sixteen wins to Cambridge's thirteen.

Although the use of sliding seats had been considered the previous year, the then-Cambridge boat club president John Goldie disallowed the Light Blue boat manufacturer Harry Clasper from fitting them. However, for the 1873 race, both boats were, for the first time, fitted with the innovation.

Cambridge were coached by John Graham Chambers (who rowed for Cambridge in the 1862 and 1863 races, and was non-rowing boat club president for the 1865 race). Oxford's coach was Robert Lesley, the non-rowing president of Oxford University Boat Club (who had rowed in the 1871 and 1872 races).

Joseph William Chitty (who had rowed for Oxford twice in 1849 (in the March and December races) and the 1852 race) returned as umpire for the race (with Robert Lewis-Lloyd having officiated the previous year) while the starter was Edward Searle.

== Crews ==
The Cambridge crew weighed an average of 11 st 11 lb (74.7 kg), 5.25 pounds (2.4 kg) more than their opponents. Oxford saw four former Blues return from the 1872 crew, while Cambridge's crew included three rowers who had participated the previous year, in James Brooks Close, Charles Stokes Read and Constantine William Benson.

Seat	Cambridge			Oxford		
Seat	Name	College	Weight	Name	College	Weight
Bow	J. B. Close	1st Trinity	11 st 3 lb	C. C. Knollys	Magdalen	10 st 12.5 lb
2	E. Hoskyns	Jesus	11 st 2 lb	J. B. Little	Christ Church	10 st 13 lb
3	J. E. Peabody	1st Trinity	11 st 7 lb	M. G. Farrer	Brasenose	12 st 4 lb
4	W. C. Lecky-Browne	Jesus	12 st 1.5 lb	A. W. Nicholson	Magdalen	12 st 9 lb
5	T. S. Turnbull	Trinity Hall	12 st 12.5 lb	R. S. Mitchison	Pembroke	12 st 7.5 lb
6	C. S. Read (P)	1st Trinity	12 st 13 lb	W. E. Sherwood	Christ Church	11 st 1 lb
7	C. W. Benson	3rd Trinity	11 st 5 lb	J. A. Ormsby	Lincoln	11 st 1.5 lb
Stroke	H. E. Rhodes	Jesus	11 st 1.5 lb	F. T. Dowding	St John's	11 st 0 lb
Cox	C. H. Candy	Gonville and Caius	7 st 5 lb	G. E. Frewer	St John's	7 st 6 lb
Source: (P) – boat club president (Robert Lesley was a non-rowing president for Oxford)

== Race ==
The Championship Course, along which the race is conducted

Oxford won the toss and elected to start from the Surrey station, handing the Middlesex side of the river to Cambridge. The race commenced at 2.32 p.m. Oxford's higher stroke rate enabled them to make "a good race of it", and remained in contention for the first mile-and-a-half to Hammersmith Bridge, but in doing so exhausted themselves. Cambridge eased off and won the race by three lengths. The winning time was 19 minutes and 35 seconds, the fastest time in the history of The Boat Race and 29 seconds faster than the previous record set in the 1869 race.
