= The Boat Race 1870 =

27th Boat Race
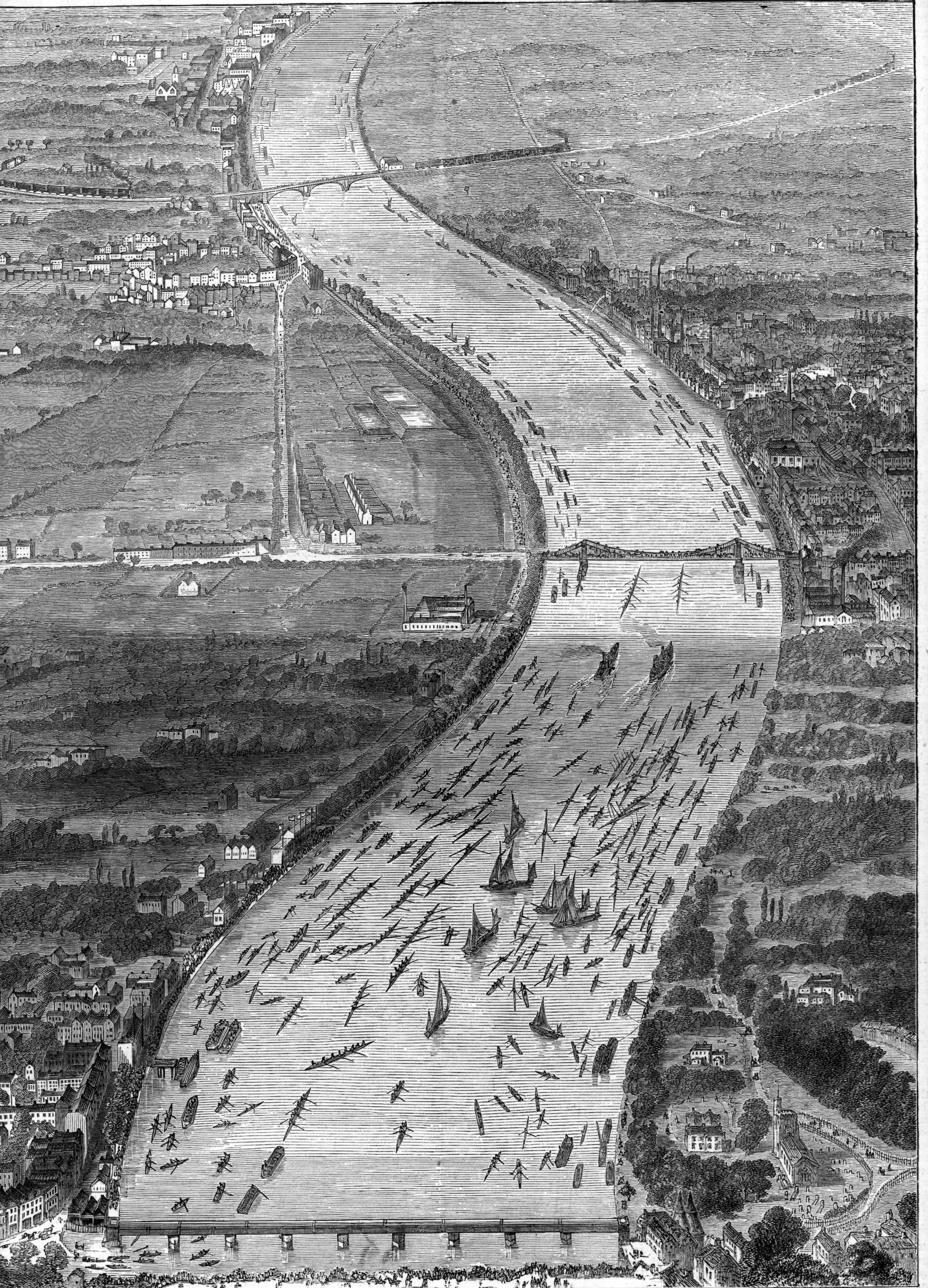
- An artist's aerial view of the 1870 Boat Race
- Date: 6 April 1870
- Winner: Cambridge
- Margin of victory: 1 1/2 lengths
- Winning time: 22 minutes 4 seconds
- Overall record (Cambridge–Oxford): 11–16
- Umpire: Joseph William Chitty (Oxford)

The 27th Boat Race between crews from the University of Oxford and the University of Cambridge took place on the River Thames on the 6 April 1870. Cambridge won by 1 1/2 lengths in a time of 22 minutes 4 seconds, their first victory since the 1860 race.

== Background ==
The Boat Race is a side-by-side rowing competition between the University of Oxford (sometimes referred to as the "Dark Blues") and the University of Cambridge (sometimes referred to as the "Light Blues"). The race was first held in 1829, and since 1845 has taken place on the 4.2-mile (6.8 km) Championship Course on the River Thames in southwest London. Oxford went into the race as reigning champions, having defeated Cambridge by three lengths in the previous year's race and led overall with sixteen wins to Cambridge's ten.

Cambridge were coached by George Morrison who had also coached them in 1869. He had rowed in the 1859, 1860 and 1861 races and had also acted as a non-rowing president for the 1862 race, yet the previous year's decision to engage a member of the opposing university was greeted with consternation and considered by many Cantabrigians as "a disgrace to the Club". Morrison had also coached Oxford six times previously. Oxford's coach was Frank Willan, who had rowed in four victories for the Dark Blues between the 1866 and the 1869 race. He also rowed for Oxford against Harvard University in 1869. The race was umpired by Joseph William Chitty who had rowed for Oxford twice in 1849 (in the March and December races) and the 1852 race, while the starter was Edward Searle.

== Crews ==
The two sets of rowers averaged the same weight, at 11 st 13.25 lb (75.7 kg) each. Oxford's crew contained four Blues, two of whom (S. D. Darbishire and W. D. Benson) were rowing in their third consecutive race. Similarly, Cambridge saw four of the 1869 crew return including the Cambridge University Boat Club president John Goldie and John Dale.

The Championship Course, along which the race is conducted

| Seat | Cambridge | | | Oxford | | |
| Seat | Name | College | Weight | Name | College | Weight |
|---|---|---|---|---|---|---|
| Bow | E. S. L Randolph | 3rd Trinity | 10 st 11.5 lb | R. W. B. Mirehouse | University | 11 st 0 lb |
| 2 | J. H. Ridley | Jesus | 11 st 9.5 lb | A. G. P. Lewis | University | 11 st 2.5 lb |
| 3 | J. W. Dale | Lady Margaret Boat Club | 12 st 2.5 lb | T. S. Baker | Queen's | 12 st 9 lb |
| 4 | E. A. A. Spencer | 2nd Trinity | 12 st 4.5 lb | J. E. Edwards-Moss | Balliol | 13 st 0 lb |
| 5 | W. H. Lowe | Christ's | 12 st 7.5 lb | F. E. H. Payne | St John's | 12 st 10 lb |
| 6 | E. L. Phelps | Sidney Sussex | 12 st 1.5 lb | S. H. Woodhouse | University | 11 st 4 lb |
| 7 | J. F. Strachan | Trinity Hall | 11 st 13 lb | W. D. Benson (P) | Balliol | 11 st 13 lb |
| Stroke | J. H. D. Goldie (P) | Lady Margaret Boat Club | 12 st 0 lb | S. D. Darbishire | Balliol | 11 st 11 lb |
| Cox | H. E. Gordon | 1st Trinity | 7 st 12 lb | F. H. Hall | Corpus Christi | 7 st 7 lb |
Source: (P) – boat club president

== Race ==
According to Drinkwater, despite Oxford being "manifestly the weaker crew", they were pre-race favourites based on their "prestige". A report in The Graphic noted that only two steamers were present, following the race, one carrying the umpire, the other to transport the Edward, Prince of Wales (who later became King Edward VII) and the Francis, Prince of Teck amongst others.

Our stroke was worth his weight i' gold,
And well did Granta's sons
Take up the time they'd given them
By Goldie of St John's!

— S. H. Catty

Oxford won the toss and elected to start from the Surrey station, handing the Middlesex side of the river to Cambridge. Cambridge took an early lead even though their stroke rate was lower than that of the Dark Blues, and led by three-quarters of a length by the time the crews shot Hammersmith Bridge. Oxford stayed in touch for the next 0.5 miles (0.8 km) but following a spurt, they almost levelled the race by Chiswick Eyot. Cambridge's stroke John Goldie led a surge to pull back ahead of Oxford, and despite their best efforts, Oxford could not recover. Cambridge won by 1 1/2 lengths in a time of 22 minutes 4 seconds. The victory was Cambridge's first since the 1860 race, and brought the overall record to 16–11 in Oxford's favour.
