= The Boat Race 1863 =

20th Boat Race
- Date: 28 March 1863
- Winner: Oxford
- Margin of victory: 15 lengths
- Winning time: 23 minutes 6 seconds
- Overall record (Cambridge–Oxford): 10–10
- Umpire: Joseph William Chitty (Oxford)

The 20th Boat Race between crews from the University of Oxford and the University of Cambridge took place on the River Thames on 28 March 1863. Oxford won by 15 lengths in a time of 23 minutes 6 seconds. It took the overall record to ten wins each, the first time since the 1836 race that the scores were level. The race was the third to be held on the ebb tide, along the Championship Course in reverse, from Mortlake to Putney. It was the first time since the race was held in the fashion since the 1856 race.

== Background ==
The Boat Race is a side-by-side rowing competition between the University of Oxford (sometimes referred to as the "Dark Blues") and the University of Cambridge (sometimes referred to as the "Light Blues"). The race was first held in 1829, and since 1845 has taken place on the 4.2-mile (6.8 km) Championship Course on the River Thames in southwest London. The rivalry is a major point of honour between the two universities, and since the 21st century, is followed throughout the United Kingdom and broadcast worldwide. Oxford went into the race as reigning champions, having won the 1862 race by ten lengths, with Cambridge leading overall with ten victories to Oxford's nine.

According to Drinkwater, neither boat club president was "sensible of their duty to posterity, for they kept no records of the training of the crews". Both crews arrived at Putney on 21 March, one week before the race, and each put in four practice sessions in the run-up to the main event. Cambridge's boat was built by Searle. The race was umpired by Joseph William Chitty who had rowed for Oxford twice in 1849 (in the March and December races) and the 1852 race.

== Crews ==
The Oxford crew averaged over 6 feet (1.83 m) in height, and weighed an average of 11 st 8.5 lb (73.5 kg), 2.75 pounds (1.2 kg) per rower more than their Light Blue opposition. Six of the Oxford crew had represented their university in the previous year's race, including W. M. Hoare who was rowing at stroke for the third time. The Cambridge boat contained two members of the 1862 crew, including William Cecil Smyly and John Graham Chambers.

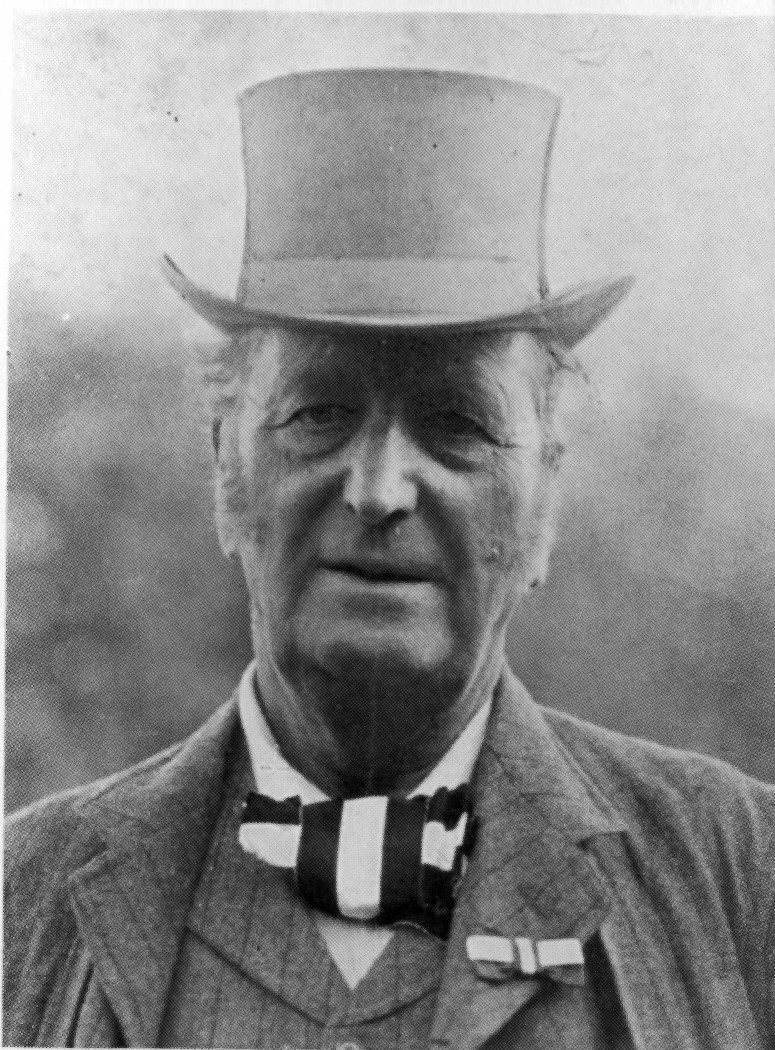
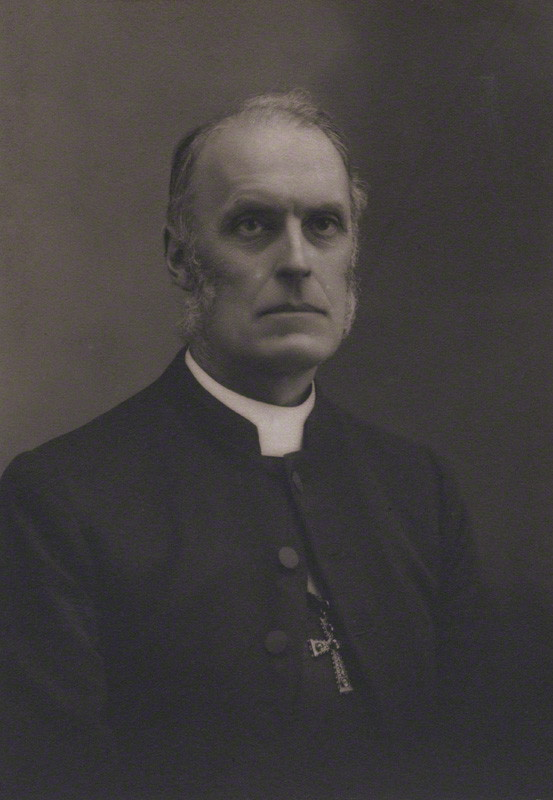
Walter Bradford Woodgate (left) rowed at four for Oxford while William Awdry (right) rowed at six.

| Seat | Cambridge | | | Oxford | | |
| Seat | Name | College | Weight | Name | College | Weight |
|---|---|---|---|---|---|---|
| Bow | J. C. Hawkshaw | 3rd Trinity | 11 st 0 lb | R. Shepherd | Brasenose | 11 st 0.5 lb |
| 2 | W. C. Smyly (P) | 1st Trinity | 11 st 4 lb | F. H. Kelly | University | 11 st 5.5 lb |
| 3 | R. H. Morgan | Emmanuel | 11 st 3 lb | W. B. R. Jacobson | Christ Church | 12 st 4 lb |
| 4 | J. Wilson | Pembroke | 11 st 10 lb | W. B. Woodgate | Brasenose | 11 st 11 lb |
| 5 | C. La Mothe | Lady Margaret | 12 st 3 lb | A. Morrison | Balliol | 12 st 4 lb |
| 6 | R. A. Kinglake | 3rd Trinity | 12 st 0 lb | W. Awdry | Balliol | 11 st 4 lb |
| 7 | J. G. Chambers | 3rd Trinity | 11 st 6 lb | C. R. Carr | Wadham | 11 st 3.5 lb |
| Stroke | J. Stanning | 1st Trinity | 10 st 6 lb | W. M. Hoare (P) | Exeter | 11 st 7.5 lb |
| Cox | F. H. Archer | Corpus Christi | 5 st 9.5 lb | F. Hopwood | Christ Church | 8 st 4.5 lb |
Source: (P) – boat club president

== Race ==
The Championship Course along which the Boat Race is competed. For the 1863 event, the crews raced on the ebb tide, so started at Mortlake (marked as Finish) and ended in Putney (marked as Start).

Oxford, who were clear pre-race favourites, won the toss and elected to start from the Middlesex station, handing the Surrey side of the river to Cambridge. Like the 1856 race, the race was conducted on the ebb tide, and the start was moved to Barker's Rails, to "give the steamers room between the Aqueduct and the crews". The start of the race was delayed for around half an hour as a result of a number of steamers impinging upon the course. The future British King, Edward VII, was in attendance. At the time of the race, there was a mild breeze and the water was "perfect, but for the steamers."

Cambridge made the better start, but Oxford's steady rowing brought them level and within 300 yards (270 m) of the start, they were nearly half-a-length up on the Light Blues. By Craven Steps, they were clear and two lengths up by the Mile Post. Oxford crossed over to row directly in front of Cambridge, and according to MacMichael, "it was evident here that the race was over, barring accidents." The Dark Blues were three lengths up as they shot Barnes Bridge and won by fifteen lengths. It was Oxford's third consecutive victory and took the overall total to ten wins each, the first time since the 1856 race that the scores were tied.
