= Joseph William Chitty =

English judge

The Right Honourable Sir Joseph Chitty
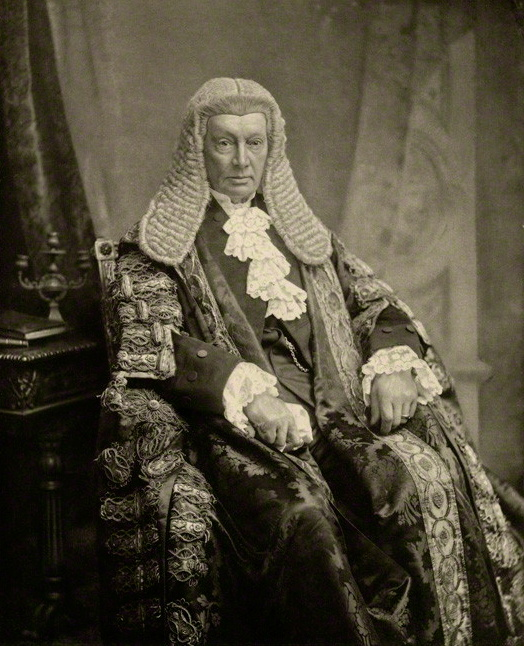

Lord Justice of Appeal
- In office 9 January 1897 – 15 February 1899

Justice of the High Court
- In office 6 September 1881 – 9 January 1897

Member of Parliament for Oxford
- In office 1880–1881

Personal details
- Born: 28 May 1828
- Died: 15 February 1899 (aged 70)
- Education: Balliol College, Oxford

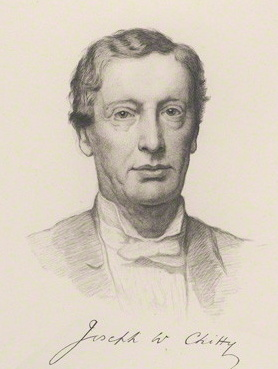
Sir Joseph William Chitty

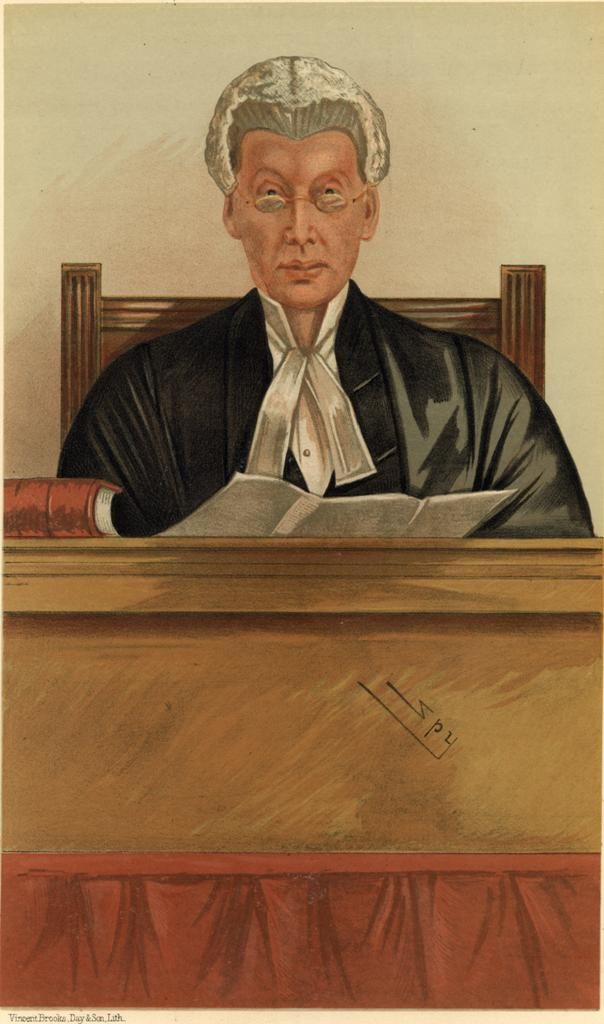
"The Umpire" Justice Chitty as caricatured by Spy (Leslie Ward) in Vanity Fair, March 1885

Sir Joseph William Chitty (28 May 1828 – 15 February 1899) was an English cricketer, rower, judge and Liberal politician.

== Early life ==
Chitty was born in London, the second son of Thomas Chitty (himself son and brother of well-known lawyers), a celebrated special pleader and writer of legal textbooks, under whose teaching many distinguished lawyers began their legal education. Joseph Chitty was educated at Eton College and Balliol College, Oxford, gaining a first-class in Literae Humaniores in 1851, and being afterwards elected to a fellowship at Exeter College.

== Sporting distinctions ==
Chitty was an all round sportsman with distinctions during his school and college career in athletics. He was a cricket wicket-keeper and played in the Eton v Harrow match in four years, captaining Eton in 1847. He also kept wicket for Marylebone Cricket Club (MCC) in 1846 and 1847. He played for Oxford University in 1848 and 1849, partaking in the Varsity match each year. Oxford won in 1848, but lost in 1849. In cricket, he played 12 innings in 7 first-class matches with an average of 15.66 and a top score of 20. He took 6 catches and stumped three times.

Chitty rowed in the Oxford University crew in both the Boat Races that were run in 1849, the March race and the December race, each university winning once. He rowed in the Oxford University eight that won the Grand Challenge Cup at Henley Royal Regatta in 1850 when there was no Boat Race on the Tideway. He also rowed in the Oxford coxed four that won the Stewards' Challenge Cup at Henley and in the same year he won the Silver Goblets, the first year the coxless pair event was run under that name. His partner was James John Hornby and they beat Thomas Howard Fellows and C L Vaughan in the final.

He repeated his success in the Grand Challenge Cup, and in the Silver Goblets in 1851 partnering James Aitken in the latter to beat John Erskine Clarke and C L Vaughan in the final. In 1852, he stroked the winning Oxford crew in the 1852 Boat Race. In 1853 he was in the Oxford four that won Stewards again and was playing cricket for I Zingari. For many years Chitty umpired the Boat Race.

In 1873 Chitty responded to Dr J Morgan, who was investigating the health effects of rowing.

"In answer to your questions, I may state that during my residence at Oxford I rowed in the University Eight against Cambridge three times at Putney, and once at Henley. I also rowed in the University Four, and in Pair-Oar Races at Oxford, Henley and the Thames Regatta. My own personal experience extends over a period of about five years, during a great part of which I was rowing in races. I am not aware that I have in any way suffered in health, either from the training or the rowing; on the contrary, my belief is that I derived from them great benefit physically."

== Legal and political career ==
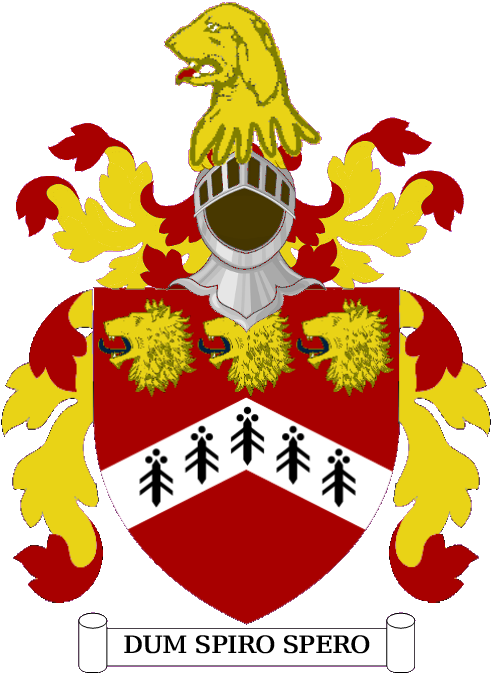
Arms, displayed at Lincoln's Inn

Chitty entered Lincoln's Inn in 1851, was called to the bar in 1856, and made a Queen's Counsel in 1874, electing to practise as such in the court of Sir George Jessel, Master of the Rolls.

In 1880, he entered the House of Commons as member for the city of Oxford. His parliamentary career was short, for in 1881 the Judicature Act required that the Master of the Rolls should cease to sit regularly as a judge of first instance, and Chitty was selected to fill the vacancy thus created in the Chancery Division.

Sir Joseph Chitty served as a judge for sixteen years and was recognized for his courtesy, geniality, patience and scrupulous fairness, as well as for his legal expertise. He was highly respected by members of the bar who appeared before him, despite a tendency to interrupt the counsel, a habit possibly influenced by Sir George Jessel.

In 1897, upon the retirement of Sir Edward Kay, L.J., he was promoted to the Court of Appeal. There he added to his reputation as a lawyer and a judge, proving that he possessed considerable knowledge of the common law as well as of equity.

== Personal life ==
In 1858, he married Clara Jessie, daughter of Chief Baron Pollock, leaving children who could claim descent from two of the best-known English legal families of the 19th century.

Grandchildren included Letitia Chitty (1897 – 1982) a structural analytical engineer who became the first female fellow of the Royal Aeronautical Society.

== Cases ==
- Sumpter v Hedges
- Cann v Willson (1888) 39 Ch D 39

== See also ==
- List of Oxford University Boat Race crews

== Notes ==
Parliament of the United Kingdom
Preceded by Alexander William Hall; Sir William Vernon Harcourt	Member of Parliament for Oxford; 1880–1881; With: Sir William Vernon Harcourt, to May 1880; Alexander William Hall, from May 1880	Vacant Constituency suspended Title next held by Alexander William Hall
