= First and Third Trinity Boat Club =

British rowing club

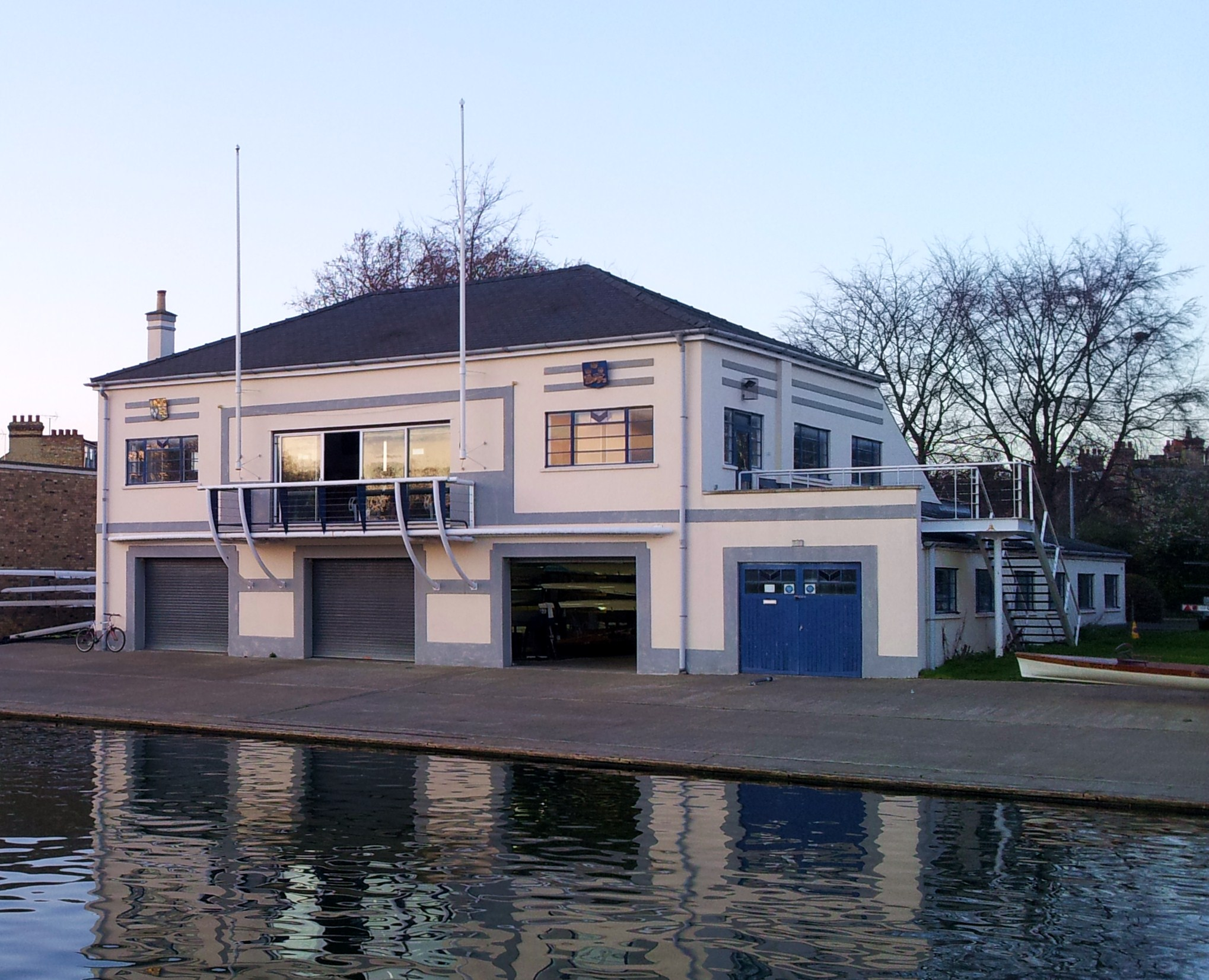

- Motto: Fama Super Aethera Notus
- Location: Cambridge, England
- Coordinates: 52°12′41.28″N 0°7′48.78″E
- Home water: River Cam
- Founded: 1946 - merger of First Trinity and Third Trinity
- Former names: Trinity College Boat Club, First Trinity Boat Club, Third Trinity Boat Club
- Membership: 100+
- University: Trinity College, Cambridge
- Affiliations: British Rowing CUCBC
- Website: www.firstandthird.org

Events
- Second Trinity Challenge Sculls, Talbott Cup

Notable members
- Justin Welby, Gregory Winter, Imogen Grant

The First and Third Trinity Boat Club is the rowing club of Trinity College in Cambridge, England. The club formally came into existence in 1946 when the First Trinity Boat Club and the Third Trinity Boat Club merged, although the two clubs had been rowing together for several years before that date.

The first boat club associated with Trinity was formed in 1825. This club then became known as First Trinity following the formation of Second Trinity Boat Club (circa. 1830), followed by the Third Trinity Boat Club in 1833. Membership of Third Trinity was originally confined to Old Etonians and Old Westminsters. Members of Third Trinity were allowed also to be members of First or Second Trinity and often were. The Second Trinity was later discontinued.

The boat club also gives its name to Trinity College's May Ball, which is the oldest such event in Cambridge and originates from the club's celebrations after the victories in the May Bumps.

== History and legend ==
In the nineteenth century the various Trinity boat clubs were very strong, often won events in Cambridge and at various regattas around the country, notably the Henley Royal Regatta, and regularly contributed rowers to the Cambridge boat for the Oxford and Cambridge Boat Race. In the 1849 Boat Race, all members of the crew were from Trinity, seven from Third Trinity and two, the cox included, from First Trinity. Boats from the three clubs could often be found at, or near, the top of the Bumps race and they sometimes combined their resources in races against the rest of the University.

In 1876 Second Trinity was disbanded due to having insufficient members. A legend claims that during the Bumps in that year, the rowers of Trinity's arch-rivals, St John's College, attached a sword to the bow of one of their boats, so that if they successfully bumped the boat in front (which turned out to be one of Second Trinity's), it would be holed and sink. The plan supposedly worked in that the Trinity boat did sink, but in the process the sword also hit and killed Second Trinity's cox, which of course was not intended. The legend claims that this is the reason why Second Trinity Boat Club was dissolved, and why St John's College is no longer allowed a boat club under its own name. There is no traced record of a crew from St John's attaching a sword to their bow and, while a St John's College Boat Club was disbanded in 1876, the original boat club at St John's was Lady Margaret Boat Club. A somewhat similar incident occurred in the 1888 Lent Bumps, 12 years after the dissolution of Second Trinity, after which bow balls became mandatory. In his History of the First Trinity Boat Club, Walter Rouse Ball observes: "The third day was the occasion of a sad tragedy. Clare bumped Queens', and drew into the bank by Grassy. Behind these boats was the Trinity Hall third boat. This, instead of rounding First Post Corner, ran, by some mishap, across the river, and the nose of the boat struck number 4 in the Clare boat just over his heart, killing him on the spot. The further races were at once stopped. Since this dreadful incident small india-rubber knobs have been fixed on the bows of all the racing boats". The more prosaic explanation for 2nd Trinity's demise is that membership was restricted to Theology scholars, who over time proved to be an unreliable source of oarsmen.

In the twentieth century the clubs remained competitive and continued to achieve success in various events. The Second World War forced the two clubs to combine resources, and after the war they formally merged in order to remain competitive with the now larger boat clubs of other colleges. In the same year First and Third won the Visitors' Challenge Cup at the Henley Royal Regatta, and the following year they won the Ladies' Challenge Plate. They won the Ladies Plate again in 1954 and in 1967, which was the last year that a college crew from either Cambridge or Oxford has won the event. The difference in the standard of rowing between Oxbridge colleges and non-University clubs changed greatly over the twentieth century, possibly due to standards at college clubs falling or to the quality of rowing in other clubs improving, but probably a combination of the two. For example, First and Third, like all other Oxbridge college crews, now have difficulty achieving a standard of rowing to qualify for events at the Henley Royal Regatta, let alone to win these events. In spite of this, rowing within Cambridge remains popular and the Bumps, the main inter-college event, see well over 1000 students competing, typically around 100 from Trinity.

=== First Trinity Boat Club ===
The Trinity Boat Club, the original rowing club of Trinity College, Cambridge, dates from 1825 and was usually called First Trinity Boat Club after 1833. It was open to all members of the College.

In 1946, the club amalgamated with the other remaining boat club of the College, Third Trinity Boat Club, to form First and Third Trinity Boat Club, and in this form continues to compete today.

The club was very successful throughout its history, but especially in the 19th century. Its early history is well covered by Walter Rouse Ball's 1908 book, A History of The First Trinity Boat Club, which is available online in its entirety.

In 1839 First Trinity won the Grand Challenge Cup in the first Henley Royal Regatta (but not made "Royal" till 1851). The crew rowed in a boat named the Black Prince, the bow section of which is still owned by the First and Third Trinity Boat Club but which is on loan to the River and Rowing Museum in Henley. They defeated the other three entries, who were Wadham College, Oxford, Brasenose College, Oxford and the Oxford Etonian Club. First and Third Trinity Boat Club still names its higher quality men's eight-oared boats 'Black Prince'. As new boats are purchased, older boats are demoted to lower boat use and are referred to by their boat registration eg Black Prince 804, Black Prince 803.

1st Trinity has won Olympic gold on two occasions. The coxless four of Charles Eley, James MacNabb, Robert Morrison and Terence Sanders won gold for Great Britain at the 1924 Summer Olympics in Paris, with Canada gaining silver, and Switzerland the bronze. In the 1928 Summer Olympics in Amsterdam, 1st Trinity successfully defended the coxless fours title (Richard Beesly, Edward Bevan, John Lander, Michael Warriner), with the United States getting silver and Italy receiving bronze.

First Trinity was also very successful on its home water, the River Cam. Between 1827 and 1908 First Trinity was "Head" crew in the University of Cambridge's Bumps races 38 times, more than any other Club.

=== Second Trinity Boat Club ===
The Second Trinity Boat Club was a short-lived rowing club at Trinity College. Little is known about the club, as very few records survive from 2nd Trinity. The club was reserved for members of the clergy and theology students who were studying at Trinity, and, by 1876 the club folded due to a lack of members.

2nd Trinity competed in the early bumps races in Cambridge from 1829 until its demise in 1876, going Head of the River in 1835 and 1849.

The club was originally known as the Nautilus Club, changing its name to Second Trinity, Queen Bess to reflect the name of its boat, a common practice at the time. The name of the club continued as Queen Bess until 1838, when it ceased competing. The club reformed in 1840 as the 2nd Trinity Boat Club, but was often described as Reading Trinity and nicknamed the Hallelujahs, in reflection of its membership. By the mid-1860s, the club was in decline, and despite efforts by the First Trinity Boat Club in 1866 to limit their membership in order to boost that of 2nd Trinity, this failed to help, and the decline continued. 1st Trinity voted to remove their membership limit once again. By 1870, the club had abandoned its original entry requirements, and allowed new students who did not have a connection to theology courses, and this allowed the club to continue for a few years, even rising back up to 7th in the bumps races in 1873. Thereafter, numbers dwindled once again, and by the Easter term 1876, the club had dropped to last but one in the first division. At a meeting of all three Trinity clubs, the 2nd Trinity Boat Club was formally dissolved, with its members given an invitation to join First Trinity.

In 1894, a group of students had claimed to have re-founded 2nd Trinity, and raced in the bumps, but the new 2nd Trinity was not recognised by the Cambridge University Boat Club and did not race again.

One of 2nd Trinity's trophies, the Baines Cup, is used today as the main prize of the Second Trinity Challenge Sculls, a sculling race run by the current 1st and 3rd Trinity members.

An account of its history can be found at First and Third Trinity Boat Club.

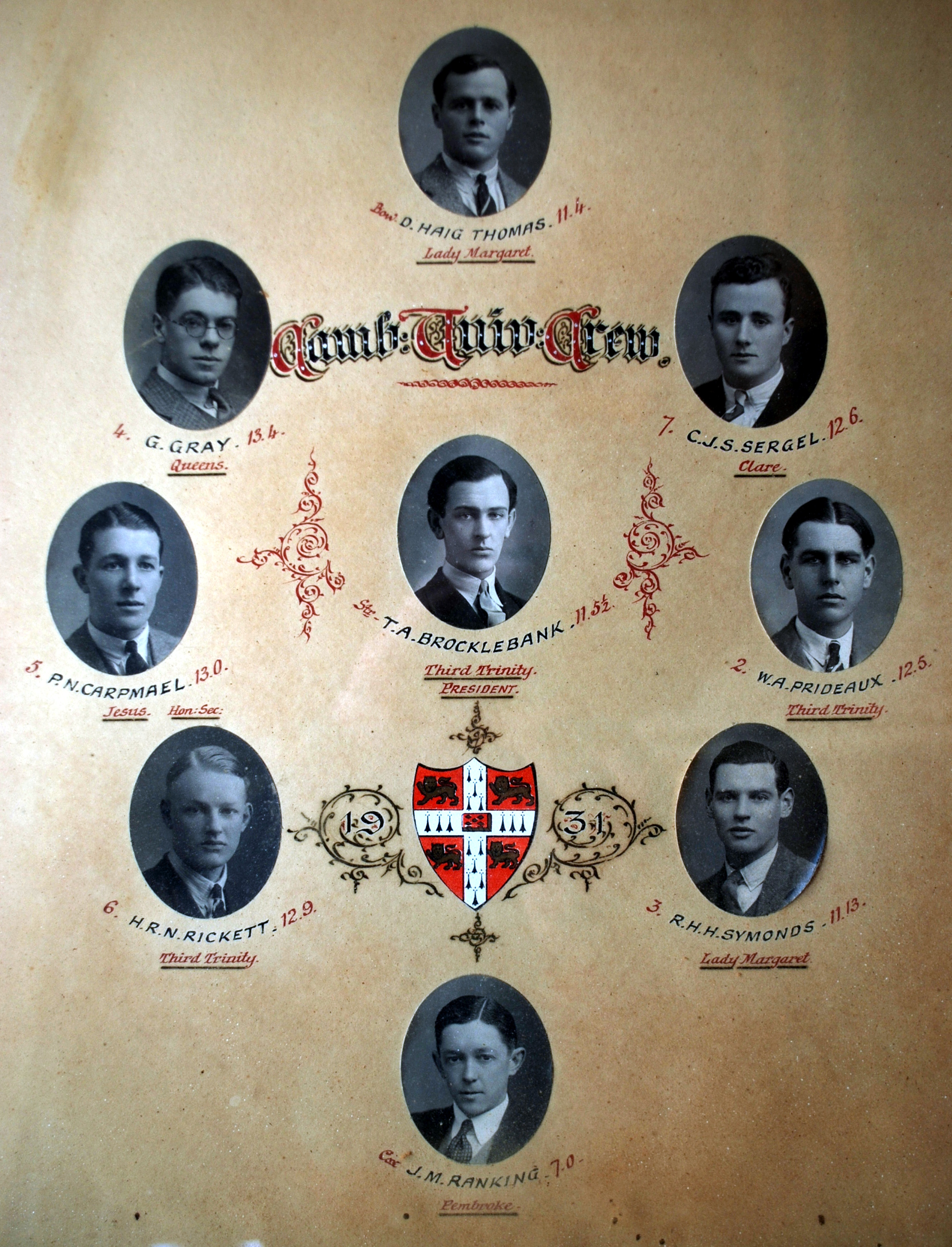
Cambridge University crew 1931, featuring members of Third Trinity at 2, 6 and as president

=== Third Trinity Boat Club ===
The Third Trinity Boat Club was a rowing club which was only open to certain members of Trinity College, Cambridge. Members of Third Trinity had to have been to school at either Eton College or Westminster School. Due to a lack of members around the time of World War II, Third Trinity combined with the First Trinity Boat Club, to make up the current First and Third Trinity Boat Club which survives to this day.

Third Trinity rowed with black blades.

==== Results ====
Third Trinity competed in the early bumps races at Cambridge University and also in the Lent and May Bumps when they became separate events in 1887.

Third Trinity nearly always did better in the May Bumps than the Lent Bumps, achieving the headship of the May Bumps on nine occasions including holding it for six consecutive years between 1901 and 1906. When the club began rowing with First Trinity, the 1st VIII were in 9th position.

Third Trinity never went head of the Lent Bumps, but managed second place in 1902 and 1922 before plummeting into the mid 2nd division just before the merger.

Third Trinity still hold the record for the most wins in the Visitors' Challenge Cup at the Henley Royal Regatta, standing at 14, even though they have not entered since the merger over 70 years ago.

=== Merger with First Trinity ===
Third Trinity merged with First Trinity officially in 1946, but the two clubs had been rowing together in the bumps throughout the war period.

In 1946, the newly formed First and Third Trinity Boat Club entered the Henley Royal Regatta and won the Visitors' Challenge Cup with ease; they won the Ladies' Challenge Plate the following year.

Following the merger, the new club took the bumps positions of First Trinity's crews, since they were placed higher than those of Third Trinity, but the new club used Third Trinity's black blades for a number of years, before switching to the current blade colours of blue and gold.

== Cultural references ==
The First Trinity Boat Club and Third Trinity Boat Club are mentioned in The Fall of Prince Florestan of Monaco by Himself, a fictitious work by Sir Charles Wentworth Dilke.

== Honours ==
=== Henley Royal Regatta ===
| Year | Races won |
|---|---|
| 1839 | Grand Challenge Cup (First Trinity) |
| 1847 | Diamond Challenge Sculls (First Trinity) |
| 1848 | Diamond Challenge Sculls (First Trinity) |
| 1849 | Visitors' Challenge Cup (Second Trinity) |
| 1852 | Diamond Challenge Sculls (First Trinity) |
| 1853 | Ladies' Challenge Plate (First Trinity) |
| 1854 | Grand Challenge Cup, Ladies' Challenge Plate (First Trinity) |
| 1858 | Wyfold Challenge Cup, Visitors' Challenge Cup (First Trinity) |
| 1859 | Ladies' Challenge Plate, Wyfold Challenge Cup, Visitors' Challenge Cup (First Trinity), Stewards' Challenge Cup (Third Trinity) |
| 1860 | Grand Challenge Cup, Stewards' Challenge Cup, Ladies' Challenge Plate, Visitors' Challenge Cup (First Trinity) |
| 1861 | Grand Challenge Cup, Stewards' Challenge Cup, Ladies' Challenge Plate, Visitors' Challenge Cup (First Trinity) |
| 1863 | Diamond Challenge Sculls (Third Trinity) |
| 1864 | Silver Goblets (Third Trinity) |
| 1865 | Stewards' Challenge Cup, Ladies' Challenge Plate, Visitors' Challenge Cup (Third Trinity) |
| 1871 | Visitors' Challenge Cup (First Trinity) |
| 1874 | Ladies' Challenge Plate (First Trinity) |
| 1880 | Visitors' Challenge Cup (Third Trinity) |
| 1881 | Ladies' Challenge Plate, Visitors' Challenge Cup (First Trinity) |
| 1884 | Visitors' Challenge Cup (Third Trinity) |
| 1886 | Silver Goblets, Diamond Challenge Sculls (Third Trinity) Visitors' Challenge Cup (First Trinity) |
| 1887 | Silver Goblets (Third Trinity) |
| 1889 | Visitors' Challenge Cup (Third Trinity) |
| 1892 | Ladies' Challenge Plate (First Trinity), Visitors' Challenge Cup (Third Trinity) |
| 1893 | Visitors' Challenge Cup (Third Trinity) |
| 1898 | Thames Challenge Cup (First Trinity) |
| 1899 | Thames Challenge Cup (First Trinity) |
| 1900 | Silver Goblets, Thames Challenge Cup (First Trinity) Visitors' Challenge Cup |
| 1901 | Stewards' Challenge Cup (Third Trinity) |
| 1902 | Grand Challenge Cup, Stewards' Challenge Cup, Silver Goblets & Nickalls' Challenge Cup (Third Trinity) |
| 1903 | Stewards' Challenge Cup (Third Trinity) |
| 1904 | Stewards' Challenge Cup, Silver Goblets & Nickalls' Challenge Cup|, Visitors' Challenge Cup (Third Trinity) |
| 1905 | Silver Goblets & Nickalls' Challenge Cup (Third Trinity) |
| 1906 | Ladies' Challenge Plate (First Trinity), Silver Goblets & Nickalls' Challenge Cup, Visitors' Challenge Cup (Third Trinity) |
| 1911 | Thames Challenge Cup (First Trinity) Visitors' Challenge Cup (Third Trinity) |
| 1913 | Ladies' Challenge Plate (First Trinity) |
| 1922 | Visitors' Challenge Cup (Third Trinity) |
| 1923 | Stewards' Challenge Cup (Third Trinity), Silver Goblets, Thames Challenge Cup (First Trinity) |
| 1924 | Stewards' Challenge Cup, Silver Goblets & Nickalls' Challenge Cup, Visitors' Challenge Cup (Third Trinity) |
| 1925 | Stewards' Challenge Cup, Silver Goblets & Nickalls' Challenge Cup, Visitors' Challenge Cup (Third Trinity), Thames Challenge Cup (First Trinity) |
| 1926 | Silver Goblets & Nickalls' Challenge Cup (Third Trinity) |
| 1927 | Ladies' Challenge Plate (First Trinity) |
| 1928 | Visitors' Challenge Cup (First Trinity) |
| 1929 | Stewards' Challenge Cup, Ladies' Challenge Plate (First Trinity) Visitors' Challenge Cup (Third Trinity) |
| 1930 | Silver Goblets & Nickalls' Challenge Cup (Third Trinity) |
| 1934 | Visitors' Challenge Cup (First Trinity) |
| 1936 | Ladies' Challenge Plate (First Trinity) |
| 1946 | Visitors' Challenge Cup |
| 1947 | Ladies' Challenge Plate |
| 1954 | Ladies' Challenge Plate, Visitors' Challenge Cup |
| 1960 | Visitors' Challenge Cup |
| 1967 | Ladies' Challenge Plate |
| 1973 | Visitors' Challenge Cup |
| 1974 | Prince Philip Challenge Cup |

== Boat Race representatives ==
The following rowers were part of the rowing club at the time of their participation in The Boat Race.

Key

- (1) = First Trinity
- (2) = Second Trinity
- (3) = Third Trinity
- + = coxswain

Men's boat race

| Year | Name |
|---|---|
| 1829 | A. B. E. Holdsworth (1) |
| 1829 | C. Warren (2) |
| 1829 | B. R. Heath+ (1) |
| 1836 | William Hammond Solly (1) |
| 1836 | John Henry Keane (1) |
| 1836 | Arthur Wilson Upcher (2) |
| 1839 | Warington Wilkinson Smyth (2) |
| 1839 | C. T. Penrose (1) |
| 1840 | William Massey (1) |
| 1840 | Sam. Barnard Taylor (1) |
| 1840 | Charles M. Vialls (3) |
| 1841 | A. M. Ritchie (1) |
| 1841 | George Denman (1) |
| 1841 | Charles M. Vialls (3) |
| 1842 | George Denman (1) |
| 1842 | A. B. Pollock+ (3) |
| 1845 | W. P. Cloves (1) |
| 1845 | J. Richardson (1) |
| 1845 | C. G. Hill (2) |
| 1845 | H. Munster (1) |
| 1845 | George Frederick Holroyd (1) |
| 1845 | Stephen Thomas Clissold (3) |
| 1845 | William Pickering Cloves (1) |
| 1845 | Ed. Parker Wolstenholme (1) |
| 1845 | Charles Gray Hill (2) |
| 1849 | H. Proby (2) |
| 1849 | W. J. H. Jones (2) |
| 1849 | Albert De Rutzen (3) |
| 1849 | J. C. Holden (3) |
| 1849 | W. L. G. Bagshawe (3) |
| 1849 | W. H. Waddington (2) |
| 1849 | W. C. Hodgson (1) |
| 1849 | J. Copley Wray (2) |
| 1849 | George Booth+ (1) |
| 1849 | A. T. Baldry (1) |
| 1849 | H. P. Pellew (3) |
| 1849 | A. R. De Rutzen (3) |
| 1849 | J. C. Holden (3) |
| 1849 | W. L. G. Bagshawe (3) |
| 1849 | H. J. Miller (3) |
| 1849 | W. C. Hodgson (1) |
| 1849 | J. C. Wray (2) |
| 1849 | George Booth+ (1) |
| 1852 | E. Macnaghten (1) |
| 1852 | H. Brandt (1) |
| 1852 | H. B. Foord (1) |
| 1852 | W. A. Norris (3) |
| 1852 | Frederick Wm. Johnson (3) |
| 1854 | R. C. Galton (1) |
| 1854 | J. Coope Davis (3) |
| 1854 | S. Agnew (1) |
| 1854 | E. Courage (1) |
| 1854 | F. W. Johnson (3) |
| 1856 | F. C. Alderson (3) |
| 1856 | R. L. Lloyd (3) |
| 1856 | H. R. M. Jones (3) |
| 1856 | W. Wingfield+ (1) |
| 1857 | A. P. Holme (2) |
| 1857 | A. Levin Smith (1) |
| 1857 | J. Jordan Serjeantson (1) |
| 1858 | A. L. Smith (1) |
| 1858 | D. Darroch (1) |
| 1858 | A. H. Fairbairn (2) |
| 1859 | N. Royds (1) |
| 1859 | A. L. Smith (1) |
| 1859 | D. Darroch (1) |
| 1859 | J. T. Morland+ (1) |
| 1860 | S. Heathcote (1) |
| 1860 | D. Ingles (1) |
| 1860 | A. H. Fairbairn (2) |
| 1860 | J. T. Morland+ (1) |
| 1861 | G. H. Richards (1) |
| 1861 | H. H. Collings (3) |
| 1861 | T. K. Gaskell+ (3) |
| 1862 | J. G. Chambers (3) |
| 1862 | W. C. Smyly (1) |
| 1862 | H. H. Collings (3) |
| 1862 | J. G. Buchanan (1) |
| 1862 | G. H. Richards (1) |
| 1863 | J. C. Hawkshaw (3) |
| 1863 | W. C. Smyly (1) |
| 1863 | R. A. Kinglake (3) |
| 1863 | J. G. Chambers (3) |
| 1863 | J. Stanning (1) |
| 1864 | J. C. Hawkshaw (3) |
| 1864 | R. A. Kinglake (3) |
| 1864 | G. Borthwick (1) |
| 1864 | J. R. Selwyn (3) |
| 1865 | R. A. Kinglake (3) |
| 1865 | G. Borthwick (1) |
| 1865 | W. R. Griffiths (3) |
| 1865 | C. B. Lawes (3) |
| 1866 | J. R. Selwyn (3) |
| 1866 | J. U. Bourke (1) |
| 1866 | R. A. Kinglake (3) |
| 1866 | W. R. Griffiths (3) |
| 1867 | W. H. Anderson (1) |
| 1867 | J. U. Bourke (1) |
| 1867 | J. H. Gordon (1) |
| 1867 | W. R. Griffiths (3) |
| 1868 | W. H. Anderson (1) |
| 1868 | J. P. Nicholls (3) |
| 1868 | W. J. Pickney (1) |
| 1869 | W. H. Anderson (1) |
| 1869 | H. E. Gordon+ (1) |
| 1870 | E. S. L Randolph (3) |
| 1870 | E. A. A. Spencer (2) |
| 1870 | H. E. Gordon+ (1) |
| 1871 | J. S. Follet (3) |
| 1871 | John B. Close (1) |
| 1871 | H. J. Lomax (1) |
| 1871 | E. A. A. Spencer (2) |
| 1871 | E. S. L. Randolph (3) |
| 1871 | H. E. Gordon+ (1) |
| 1872 | James B. Close (1) |
| 1872 | C. W. Benson (3) |
| 1872 | E. A. A. Spencer (2) |
| 1872 | C. S. Read (1) |
| 1872 | John B. Close (1) |
| 1872 | E. S. L. Randolph (3) |
| 1873 | John B. Close (1) |
| 1873 | J. E. Peabody (1) |
| 1873 | C. S. Read (1) |
| 1873 | C. W. Benson (3) |
| 1874 | John B. Close (1) |
| 1874 | J. A. Aylmer (1) |
| 1874 | C. S. Read (1) |
| 1875 | W. B. Close (1) |
| 1875 | G. C. Dicker (1) |
| 1875 | W. G. Michell (1) |
| 1875 | J. A. Aylmer (1) |
| 1875 | C. W. Benson (3) |
| 1876 | W. B. Close (1) |
| 1877 | J. C. Fenn (1) |
| 1877 | W. B. Close (1) |
| 1878 | T. W. Barker (1) |
| 1879 | A. H. S. Bird (1) |
| 1879 | R. D. Davis (1) |
| 1880 | R. D. Davis (1) |

| Year | Name |
|---|---|
| 1881 | R. C. M. G. Gridley (3) |
| 1882 | J. C. Fellowes (1) |
| 1882 | S. P. Smith (1) |
| 1883 | R. C. M. G. Gridley (3) |
| 1883 | F. W. Fox (1) |
| 1883 | F. E. Churchill (3) |
| 1884 | R. C. M. G. Gridley (3) |
| 1884 | F. E. Churchill (3) |
| 1884 | E. W. Haig (3) |
| 1884 | F. I. Pitman (3) |
| 1885 | W. H. W. Perrott (1) |
| 1885 | F. E. Churchill (3) |
| 1885 | E. W. Haig (3) |
| 1885 | F. I. Pitman (3) |
| 1926 | G. Wilson+ (1) |
| 1886 | S. D. Muttlebury (3) |
| 1886 | C. Barclay (3) |
| 1886 | F. I. Pitman (3) |
| 1887 | C. T. Barclay (3) |
| 1887 | S. D. Muttlebury (3) |
| 1887 | C. Barclay (3) |
| 1888 | R. H. P. Orde (1) |
| 1888 | S. D. Muttlebury (3) |
| 1889 | R. H. P. Orde (1) |
| 1889 | S. D. Muttlebury (3) |
| 1890 | G. Elin (3) |
| 1890 | S. D. Muttlebury (3) |
| 1890 | G. Francklyn (3) |
| 1891 | G. Francklyn (3) |
| 1891 | G. Elin (3) |
| 1892 | G. Francklyn (3) |
| 1892 | G. C. Kerr (1) |
| 1892 | G. Elin (3) |
| 1893 | G. A. H. Branson (1) |
| 1893 | L. A. E. Olliivant (1) |
| 1893 | G. C. Kerr (1) |
| 1893 | R. O. Kerrison (3) |
| 1893 | T. G. E. Lewis (3) |
| 1893 | C. T. Agar+ (3) |
| 1894 | A. H. Finch (3) |
| 1894 | N. W. Paine (3) |
| 1894 | Charles Ross (3) |
| 1894 | H. M. Bland (3) |
| 1894 | L. A. E. Olliivant (1) |
| 1894 | R. O. Kerrison (3) |
| 1894 | T. G. E. Lewis (3) |
| 1895 | H. A. Game (1) |
| 1895 | W. S. Adie (1) |
| 1896 | H. A. Game (1) |
| 1897 | W. Dudley Ward (3) |
| 1898 | J. F. Beale (1) |
| 1898 | H. G. Brown (1) |
| 1898 | R. B. Etherington-Smith (1) |
| 1898 | C. J. D. Goldie (3) |
| 1899 | W. H. Chapman (3) |
| 1899 | C. J. D. Goldie (3) |
| 1899 | R. B. Etherington-Smith (1) |
| 1899 | R. H. Sanderson (1) |
| 1899 | W. Dudley Ward (3) |
| 1899 | J. H. Gibbon (3) |
| 1899 | G. A. Lloyd+ (3) |
| 1900 | S. P. Cockerell (3) |
| 1900 | C. J. M. Adie (1) |
| 1900 | B. W. D. Brooke (1) |
| 1900 | R. B. Etherington-Smith (1) |
| 1900 | R. H. Sanderson (1) |
| 1900 | W. Dudley Ward (3) |
| 1900 | J. H. Gibbon (3) |
| 1900 | G. A. Lloyd+ (3) |
| 1901 | R. H. Nelson (3) |
| 1901 | B. W. D. Brooke (1) |
| 1901 | C. W. H. Taylor (3) |
| 1901 | G. Parker (1) |
| 1901 | H. B. Grylls (1) |
| 1901 | G. M. Maitland (1) |
| 1901 | E. A. O. A. Jamieson+ (1) |
| 1902 | W. H. Chapman (3) |
| 1902 | P. H. Thomas (3) |
| 1902 | C. W. H. Taylor (3) |
| 1902 | H. B. Grylls (1) |
| 1902 | J. Edwards-Moss (3) |
| 1902 | R. H. Nelson (3) |
| 1903 | W. H. Chapman (3) |
| 1903 | P. H. Thomas (3) |
| 1903 | S. R. Beale (1) |
| 1903 | C. W. H. Taylor (3) |
| 1903 | H. B. Grylls (1) |
| 1903 | J. Edwards-Moss (3) |
| 1903 | R. H. Nelson (3) |
| 1904 | B. C. Johnstone (3) |
| 1904 | A. L. Lawrence (1) |
| 1904 | R. V. Powell (3) |
| 1904 | P. H. Thomas (3) |
| 1905 | W. B. Savory (1) |
| 1905 | B. C. Johnstone (3) |
| 1905 | P. H. Thomas (3) |
| 1905 | B. R. Winthrop-Smith (3) |
| 1905 | R. V. Powell (3) |
| 1905 | R. Allcard+ (3) |
| 1906 | G. D. Cochrane (3) |
| 1906 | M. Donaldson (1) |
| 1906 | B. C. Johnstone (3) |
| 1906 | R. V. Powell (3) |
| 1906 | E. W. Powell (3) |
| 1907 | A. B. Close-Brooks (1) |
| 1907 | J. S. Burn (1) |
| 1907 | H. G. Baynes (1) |
| 1907 | B. C. Johnstone (3) |
| 1907 | E. W. Powell (3) |
| 1908 | O. A. Carver (1) |
| 1908 | J. S. Burn (1) |
| 1908 | E. G. Williams (3) |
| 1908 | E. W. Powell (3) |
| 1909 | R. W. M. Arbuthnot (3) |
| 1909 | E. G. Williams (3) |
| 1909 | J. B. Rosher (1) |
| 1910 | R. W. M. Arbuthnot (3) |
| 1910 | F. E. Hellyer (1) |
| 1910 | E. G. Williams (3) |
| 1910 | J. B. Rosher (1) |
| 1910 | C. R. le Blanc Smith (3) |
| 1911 | F. E. Hellyer (1) |
| 1911 | C. F. Burnand (1) |
| 1911 | C. R. le Blanc Smith (3) |
| 1911 | J. B. Rosher (1) |
| 1911 | R. W. M. Arbuthnot (3) |
| 1912 | R. W. M. Arbuthnot (3) |
| 1912 | D. C. Collins (1) |
| 1912 | R. S. Shove (1) |
| 1912 | C. R. le Blanc Smith (3) |
| 1912 | L. S. Lloyd (3) |
| 1913 | R. S. Shove (1) |
| 1913 | C. E. V. Buxton (3) |
| 1913 | G. E. Tower (3) |
| 1914 | J. A. Ritson (1) |
| 1914 | K. G. Garnett (1) |
| 1914 | C. E. V. Buxton (3) |
| 1914 | G. E. Tower (3) |
| 1920 | H. O. C. Boret (3) |

| Year | Name |
|---|---|
| 1920 | R. L. L. McEwan (3) |
| 1921 | H. O. C. Boret (3) |
| 1921 | A. D. B. Pearson (1) |
| 1921 | J. W. H. Fremantle (3) |
| 1922 | A. J. Hodgkin (1) |
| 1922 | A. D. B. Pearson (1) |
| 1922 | J. W. H. Fremantle (3) |
| 1923 | W. F. Smith (1) |
| 1923 | R. E. Morrison (3) |
| 1923 | T. R. B. Sanders (3) |
| 1923 | R. A. L. Balfour (3) |
| 1924 | J. A. Macnabb (3) |
| 1924 | C. R. M. Eley (3) |
| 1925 | W. F. Smith (1) |
| 1925 | H. R. Carver (3) |
| 1926 | W. F. Smith (1) |
| 1926 | E. C. Hamilton-Russell (3) |
| 1927 | J. S. Maclay (1) |
| 1927 | R. Beesly (1) |
| 1928 | M. H. Warriner (1) |
| 1928 | R. Beesly (1) |
| 1928 | J. B. Collins (3) |
| 1929 | E. N. Norman-Butler (3) |
| 1929 | R. A. Davies-Cooke (3) |
| 1929 | R. Beesly (1) |
| 1929 | M. H. Warriner (1) |
| 1929 | J. B. Collins (3) |
| 1929 | C. E. Wool-Lewis (3) |
| 1929 | T. A. Brocklebank (3) |
| 1930 | H. R. N. Rickett (3) |
| 1930 | W. A. Prideaux (3) |
| 1930 | M. H. Warriner (1) |
| 1930 | J. B. Collins (3) |
| 1930 | T. A. Brocklebank (3) |
| 1930 | R. E. Swartwout (1) |
| 1931 | W. A. Prideaux (3) |
| 1931 | H. R. N. Rickett (3) |
| 1931 | T. A. Brocklebank (3) |
| 1932 | K. M. Payne (3) |
| 1932 | H. R. N. Rickett (3) |
| 1933 | C. M. Fletcher (3) |
| 1933 | T. Frame-Thomson (3) |
| 1934 | K. M. Payne (3) |
| 1935 | J. H. C. Powell (3) |
| 1935 | M. P. Lonnon (3) |
| 1936 | M. P. Lonnon (3) |
| 1937 | M. P. Lonnon (3) |
| 1938 | D. S. M. Eadie (1) |
| 1939 | M. Buxton (3) |
| 1946 | G. H. C. Fisher |
| 1947 | G. H. C. Fisher |
| 1948 | A. B. C. Harrison |
| 1949 | J. R. la T. Corrie |
| 1953 | J. R. MacMillan |
| 1955 | P. du Bois |
| 1955 | A. A. M. Mays-Smith |
| 1955 | S. G. D. Tozer |
| 1955 | R. A. G. Monks |
| 1957 | T. P. A. Norman |
| 1958 | R. D. Carver |
| 1958 | P. D. Rickett |
| 1959 | T. C. Heywood-Lonsdale |
| 1959 | B. M. P. Thompson-McCausland |
| 1960 | S. R. M. Price |
| 1961 | M. W. Christian |
| 1961 | M. Hoffman |
| 1962 | Boyce Budd |
| 1962 | J. N. L. Tollemache |
| 1962 | Jamie Waldegrave |
| 1963 | Jamie Waldegrave |
| 1963 | F. G. G. de Rancourt+ |
| 1964 | J. M. S. Lecky |
| 1964 | J. R. Kiely |
| 1965 | W. E. Church |
| 1966 | M. D. Tebay |
| 1966 | J. H. Ashby |
| 1966 | P. H. Conze |
| 1968 | R. C. W. Church |
| 1969 | C. W. Daws |
| 1970 | J. F. S. Hervey-Bathurst |
| 1971 | J. F. S. Hervey-Bathurst |
| 1971 | S. R. Waters III |
| 1973 | J. D. Lever |
| 1973 | S. C. Tourek |
| 1975 | C. Langridge |
| 1975 | S. C. Tourek |
| 1976 | P. B. Davies |
| 1976 | R. M. Cashin |
| 1978 | W. M. R. Dawkins |
| 1983 | S. W. Berger |
| 1984 | S. W. Berger |
| 1986 | Jim S. Pew |
| 1987 | Jim S. Pew |
| 1988 | R. S. N. Ames |
| 1988 | S. J. Loveridge+ |
| 1990 | Ed C. Clark |
| 1996 | Julian R. Elliott |
| 1997 | Damien Maltarp |
| 1999 | David O. M. Ellis |
| 2000 | Howard N. F. Martin |
| 2000 | Richard P. Stokes |
| 2008 | Tobias Garnett |
| 2016 | Ali Abbasi |
| 2017 | Hugo Ramambason+ |
| 2018 | Hugo Ramambason+ |
| 2021 | Charlie Marcus+ |
| 2022 | Charlie Marcus+ |

Women's boat race

| Year | Name |
|---|---|
| 1986 | N. C. Murray |
| 1987 | N. C. Murray |
| 1998 | B. W. Parr+ |
| 1999 | C. L. G. Y. Ng |
| 2000 | C. L. G. Y. Ng |
| 2005 | A. Doubrovina |
| 2017 | Imogen Grant |
| 2018 | Imogen Grant |
| 2022 | Imogen Grant |

== See also ==
- University rowing (UK)
