= The Boat Race 1864 =

21st Boat Race
- Date: 14 March 1864
- Winner: Oxford
- Margin of victory: 9 lengths
- Winning time: 21 minutes 4 seconds
- Overall record (Cambridge–Oxford): 10–11
- Umpire: Joseph William Chitty (Oxford)

The 21st Boat Race, an annual side-by-side rowing race between crews from the Universities of Oxford and Cambridge along the River Thames, took place on 14 March 1864. Umpired by Joseph William Chitty, Oxford won by nine lengths in a time of 21 minutes 4 seconds, the fastest winning time since the event was held on The Championship Course in 1845. The race, whose start was moved in order to avoid interruptions from river traffic, was witnessed by the Prince of Wales.

== Background ==
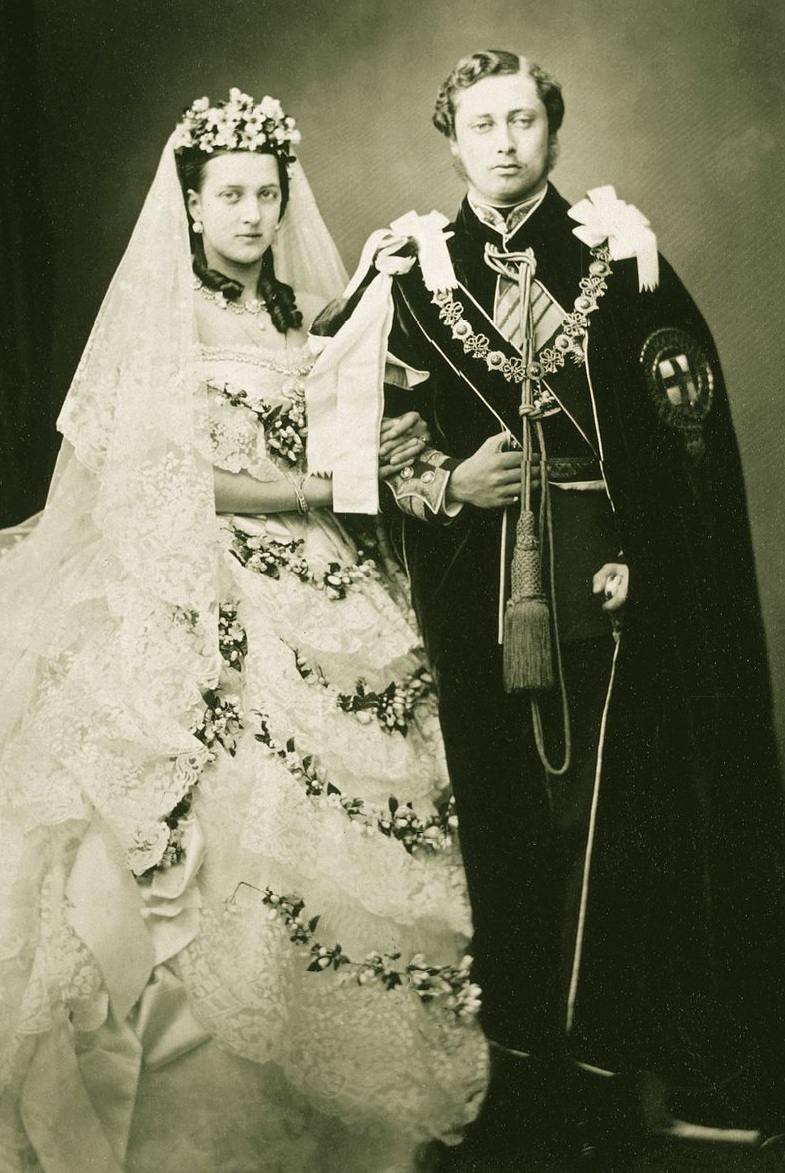
The Prince of Wales, Edward VII, (right) attended the race.

The Boat Race is a side-by-side rowing competition between the University of Oxford (sometimes referred to as the "Dark Blues") and the University of Cambridge (sometimes referred to as the "Light Blues"). The race was first held in 1829, and since 1845 has taken place on the 4.2-mile (6.8 km) Championship Course on the River Thames in southwest London. The rivalry is a major point of honour between the two universities and followed throughout the United Kingdom and worldwide. Oxford went into the race as reigning champions, having won the 1863 race by ten lengths, with the overall record tied on ten victories each.

The location of the start of the race was moved to approximately 400 feet (122 m) upstream of Putney Bridge in order to reduce interruptions to the race from steamers. Indeed, both boat club presidents had issued a caution to the steamer captains, indicating that the race would be conducted on the ebb tide should any interruption take place which would risk the steamers becoming grounded at Mortlake. The finish was moved the corresponding distance upstream to maintain the traditional length of the race. Oxford rowed in the same boat as the previous race, which was constructed by J. and S. Salter while Cambridge utilised a new vessel built for them by Taylor of Newcastle. Oxford were coached by George Morrison who had rowed in the 1859, 1860 and 1861 races and was non-rowing president for the 1862 race. The race was umpired by Joseph William Chitty who had rowed for Oxford twice in 1849 (in the March and December races) and the 1852 race, while the starter was Edward Searle.

== Crews ==
The Cambridge crew weighed an average of 11 st 11.5 lb (74.9 kg), 4 pounds (1.8 kg) per rower more than their Dark Blue opposition. Cambridge's crew, however, was tall, averaging over 6 ft 0 in (1.83 m) per rower. Oxford's crew contained three rowers from the previous years race in William Awdry, F. H. Kelly and W. B. R. Jacobson. The Cambridge boat also saw three participants from the 1863 race: bow John Hawkshaw, number five Robert Kinglake and cox Francis Archer (who had also coxed the Light Blues in the 1862 race) returned.

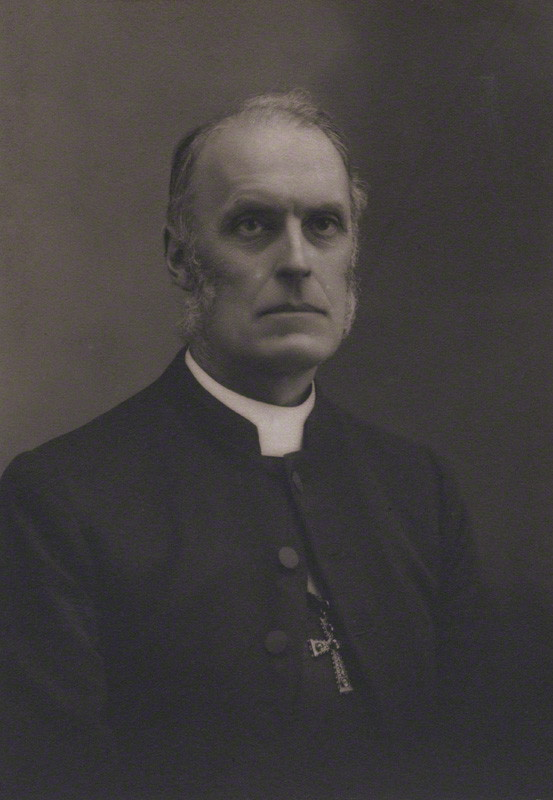
William Awdry rowed at number 2 for Oxford.

| Seat | Cambridge | | | Oxford | | |
| Seat | Name | College | Weight | Name | College | Weight |
|---|---|---|---|---|---|---|
| Bow | J. C. Hawkshaw (P) | 3rd Trinity | 11 st 3 lb | C. Roberts | Trinity | 10 st 9 lb |
| 2 | E. V. Pigott | Corpus Christi | 11 st 9 lb | W. Awdry | Balliol | 11 st 4.5 lb |
| 3 | H. Watson | Pembroke | 12 st 4 lb | F. H. Kelly | University | 11 st 9 lb |
| 4 | W. Hawkins | Lady Margaret | 12 st 0 lb | J. Parsons | Trinity | 12 st 9 lb |
| 5 | R. A. Kinglake | 3rd Trinity | 12 st 4 lb | W. B. R. Jacobson | Christ Church | 12 st 3.5 lb |
| 6 | G. Borthwick | 1st Trinity | 12 st 1 lb | A. E. Seymour | University | 11 st 3 lb |
| 7 | D. F. Steavenson | Trinity Hall | 12 st 1 lb | M. Brown | Trinity | 11 st 3 lb |
| Stroke | J. R. Selwyn | 3rd Trinity | 11 st 0 lb | D. Pocklington | Brasenose | 11 st 5 lb |
| Cox | F. H. Archer | Corpus Christi | 6 st 6 lb | C. R. W. Tottenham | Christ Church | 7 st 3 lb |
Source: (P) – boat club president (C. R. Carr was the non-rowing president of Oxford University Boat Club)

== Race ==
The Championship Course, along which the race is conducted

The weather on the day of the race was sunny with a mild breeze. The Prince of Wales, future King of the United Kingdom Edward VII was in attendance; as a result, the start time was moved forward to enable the Prince to leave for another engagement. Oxford were pre-race favourites, and won the toss, electing to start from the Middlesex station, handing the Surrey side of the river to Cambridge. The Cantabrigians made the better start, and soon led by a third of a length. However, by Finch's field, Oxford had recovered to draw level and started to leave the Light Blues behind. Half a mile into the course, the Dark Blues held a half-length lead which they extended to a length by Craven Cottage.

With a clear water advantage, they crossed in front of Cambridge and were three lengths ahead by the Crab Tree pub, extending to "four or five lengths" by Hammersmith Bridge. They were so far ahead at Barnes Bridge their advantage in lengths was impossible "to be accurately counted". Misinterpreting the position of the finish line, the Oxford crew stopped rowing early, but once aware of their mistake, rowed on to the finish, winning by nine lengths in a time of 21 minutes 4 seconds. It was their fourth consecutive victory and was, at the time, the fastest winning time in the history of the event.
