= The Boat Race 1842 =

6th Boat Race
- Date: 11 June 1842
- Winner: Oxford
- Margin of victory: 4 1/2 lengths
- Winning time: 30 minutes 1 second
- Overall record (Cambridge–Oxford): 4–2
- Umpire: W. H. Harrison

The 6th Boat Race took place on the River Thames on 11 June 1842. The Boat Race is a side-by-side rowing race between crews from the Universities of Oxford and Cambridge. In a race substantially interrupted by river traffic, Oxford beat Cambridge by a distance of 4 1/2 lengths.

== Background ==
The Boat Race, first held in 1829, is a side-by-side rowing competition between the University of Oxford (sometimes referred to as the "Dark Blues") and the University of Cambridge (sometimes referred to as the "Light Blues"). Cambridge went into the race as reigning champions, having defeated Oxford by 22 lengths in the previous year's race. They led overall with four wins to Oxford's one.

Cambridge University Boat Club received the challenge to race from the Oxford University Boat Club secretary Fletcher Menzies in late 1841, in which it was proposed that a race between the universities should take place in late June or early July 1842. Cambridge rejected the suggestion, maintaining that an Easter race would be preferable. A challenge from their captain, John Ridley, was then sent to Leander Club, whose reply bemoaned the fact that they had insufficient numbers to provide an eight, suggesting a four instead. This counteroffer was also rejected and Cambridge offered to row "any eight-oared crew from any club or clubs whatsoever." After further, somewhat acrimonious discussion, it was agreed that Oxford would challenge Cambridge on 11 June 1842, with the caveat that the Light Blues would not row on the Thames before 8 June.

The race took place on a five-and-three-quarter-mile (9.2 km) stretch of the Thames between Westminster Bridge and Putney Bridge. The umpire for the race was W. H. Harrison, Commodore of the Royal Thames Yacht Club.

== Crews ==
The Oxford crew weighed an average of 11 st 9.375 lb (73.9 kg), about 5.5 pounds (2.5 kg) per rower more than their Light Blue opposition. None of the Oxford crew had rowed in previous Boat Races while Cambridge saw five return from the previous year's event, including John M. Ridley and Francis Penrose who had rowed in the 1840 race.

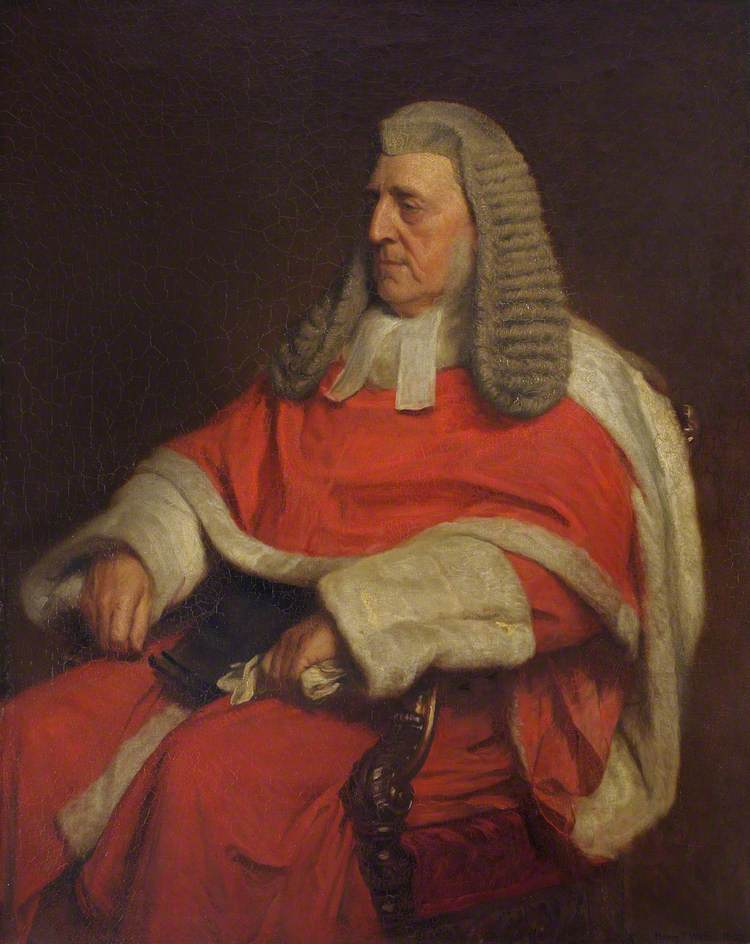
George Denman rowed at number seven for Cambridge.

Seat	Cambridge			Oxford		
Seat	Name	College	Weight	Name	College	Weight
Bow	F. E. Tower	Lady Margaret	10 st 2 lb	F. T. Macdougall	Magdalen Hall	9 st 8 lb
2	Hon. L. Denman	Magdalene	10 st 11 lb	R. Menzies	University	11 st 3 lb
3	W. Watson	Jesus	10 st 13 lb	Ed. A. Breadon	Trinity	12 st 4 lb
4	F. C. Penrose	Magdalene	11 st 10 lb	W. B. Brewster	St John's	12 st 10 lb
5	R. H. Cobbold	Peterhouse	12 st 6 lb	G. Drinkwater Bourne	Oriel	13 st 12 lb
6	J. Royds	Christ's	11 st 7 lb	J. C. Cox	Trinity	11 st 8 lb
7	G. Denman	1st Trinity	10 st 9 lb	G. E. Hughes (P)	Oriel	11 st 6 lb
Stroke	J. M. Ridley (P)	Jesus	12 st 0 lb	F. N. Menzies	University	10 st 12 lb
Cox	A. B. Pollock	3rd Trinity	9 st 7 lb	A. T. W. Shadwell	Balliol	10 st 4 lb
Source: (P) – boat club president

== Race ==
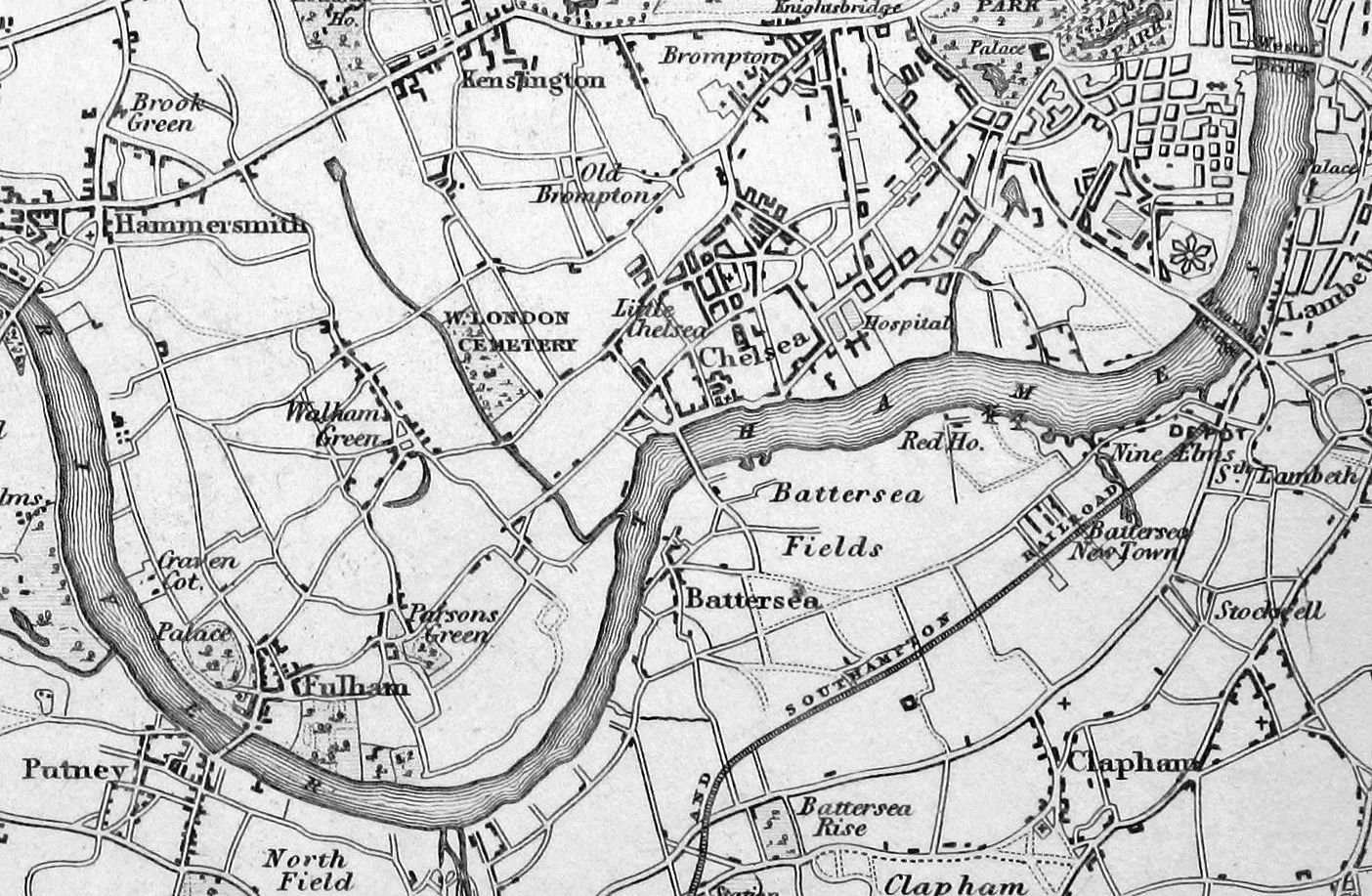
The 1842 race took place between Westminster and Putney bridges.

Cambridge won the toss and elected to start on the Middlesex side of the river, handing Oxford the Surrey side of the river. Both boats started below the arches of Westminster Bridge. Although Oxford made the better start, Cambridge pulled ahead and led until their course was diverted by river traffic including a steamer and a lighter, allowing the Dark Blues to retake the lead. Between the National Penitentiary and Wandsworth, according to MacMichael "they were not once free from the swell of the steamers" but continued to extend their lead. Once clear of the steamers, Cambridge began to close the gap in the last mile to Putney, but Oxford passed under Putney Bridge with a lead of 4 1/2 lengths in a time of 30 minutes 1 second. It was their first victory since the inaugural race in 1829, hence their first win on "London water".
