= The Boat Race 1845 =

7th Boat Race
- Date: 17 March 1845
- Winner: Cambridge
- Margin of victory: 10 lengths
- Winning time: 23 minutes 30 seconds
- Overall record (Cambridge–Oxford): 5–2
- Umpire: W. H. Harrison

The 7th Boat Race took place on the River Thames on 17 March 1845. The Boat Race is a side-by-side rowing race between crews from the Universities of Oxford and Cambridge. It was the first time the event was contested along The Championship Course, from Putney to Mortlake. The race was won by Cambridge who beat Oxford by a distance of ten lengths.

== Background ==
The 1845 Boat Race was the first year the event was competed for along The Championship Course.

The Boat Race, first held in 1829, is a side-by-side rowing competition between the University of Oxford (sometimes referred to as the "Dark Blues") and the University of Cambridge (sometimes referred to as the "Light Blues"). Oxford went into the race as reigning champions, having defeated Cambridge by 4 1/2 lengths in the previous race held in 1842. However, Cambridge led overall with four wins to Oxford's two.

The universities failed to agree on a location or a date for a race in 1843 or 1844, so no contests were held those years. In November 1844, the Cambridge University Boat Club secretary wrote to Oxford in an attempt to restart the Easter running of the Boat Race. The Oxford committee "seemed willing" and in the Lent term proposed a change to the course, to race above Putney Bridge rather than below it on 15 March. It was the first Boat Race to be conducted between Putney and Mortlake on The Championship Course, previous races having taken place between Westminster Bridge and Putney Bridge, or on the Thames at Henley between Hambleden Lock and Henley Bridge. Cambridge arrived in London on the Wednesday before the race, Oxford following two days later. Following their displays in practice rows, Cambridge were considered favourites for the race.

Cambridge "rowed in an outrigger built by Searle, 60 feet (18 m) in length, 2 feet 8 inches (0.81 m) in breadth", while Oxford's boat was "expressly built for this match by King of Oxford" and 58 feet 6 inches (17.83 m) long. However, the river conditions on the day were so rough that the Cambridge crew abandoned using their new boat and instead used their training boat, which was built by Logan and belonged to Second Trinity Boat Club.

The umpire for the race was W. H. Harrison, Commodore of the Royal Thames Yacht Club, while the starter was Edward Searle.

== Crews ==
The Oxford crew weighed an average of 11 st 9 lb (73.8 kg), 6.375 pounds (2.9 kg) per rower more than their Light Blue opposition. None of the crews had rowed in previous Boat Races.

Seat	Cambridge			Oxford		
Seat	Name	College	Weight	Name	College	Weight
Bow	Gerard Mann	Gonville and Caius	10 st 7 lb	M. Haggard	Christ Church	10 st 3 lb
2	W. Harkness	Lady Margaret	10 st 0 lb	W. C. Stapylton	Merton	10 st 12 lb
3	W. S. Lockhart	Christ's	11 st 3 lb	W. H. Milman	Christ Church	11 st 0 lb
4	W. P. Cloves	1st Trinity	12 st 0 lb	H. Lewis	Pembroke	11 st 7 lb
5	F. M. Arnold	Gonville and Caius	12 st 0 lb	W. Buckle	Oriel	13 st 12 lb
6	R. Harkness	Lady Margaret	11 st 0 lb	F. C. Royds	Pembroke	11 st 5 lb
7	J. Richardson (P)	1st Trinity	12 st 0 lb	F. M. Wilson	Christ Church	12 st 3 lb
Stroke	C. G. Hill	2nd Trinity	10 st 11 lb	F. E. Tuke (P)	Brasenose	12 st 2 lb
Cox	H. Munster	1st Trinity	9 st 2 lb	F. J. Richards	Exeter	10 st 10 lb
Source: (P) – boat club president

== Race ==
The conditions for the race were "of the most inclement possible" and the water "very rough". Cambridge won the toss and elected to start from the Middlesex station, handing the Surrey station to Oxford. The Light Blues made the better start but swell from a steamer dislodged the oar of Richardson and allowed Oxford to take the lead. Cambridge gradually recovered to draw level and by Bishop of London's Walk were clear. Despite poor steering from both coxes (and Henry Munster losing his hat while waving it at the crowds), Cambridge were three lengths ahead by Hammersmith Bridge. They continued to pull away and won by ten lengths in a time of 23 minutes 30 seconds. It was their fifth victory overall, to Oxford's two since the first Boat Race of 1829. Cambridge inflicted a second defeat on Oxford later that year, winning the Grand Challenge Cup at the Henley Royal Regatta.
