= The Boat Race 1865 =

22nd Boat Race
- Date: 8 April 1865
- Winner: Oxford
- Margin of victory: 4 lengths
- Winning time: 21 minutes 24 seconds
- Overall record (Cambridge–Oxford): 10–12
- Umpire: Joseph William Chitty (Oxford)

The 22nd Boat Race between crews from the University of Oxford and the University of Cambridge took place on the River Thames on 8 April 1865. Oxford won by four lengths in a time of 21 minutes 24 seconds. The race, described as "one of the most sensational races in this history" thus far, was umpired by Joseph William Chitty. It was the first time that a crew had won the Boat Race after being behind at Hammersmith Bridge.

== Background ==
The Boat Race is a side-by-side rowing competition between the University of Oxford (sometimes referred to as the "Dark Blues") and the University of Cambridge (sometimes referred to as the "Light Blues"). The race was first held in 1829, and since 1845 has taken place on the 4.2-mile (6.8 km) Championship Course on the River Thames in southwest London. The rivalry is a major point of honour between the two universities and followed throughout the United Kingdom and worldwide. Oxford went into the race as reigning champions, having won the 1864 race by nine lengths, with Oxford leading overall with eleven victories to Cambridge's ten.

Cambridge were coached by their non-rowing president J. G. Chambers (who had rowed in the 1862 and 1863 races), while Oxford's coach was G. Morrison (who had rowed for Oxford three times as well as being a non-rowing president in 1862). Both university boats were constructed by J. & S. Salter of Oxford using cedar wood. The race was umpired by Joseph William Chitty who had rowed for Oxford twice in 1849 (in the March and December races) and the 1852 race, while the starter was Edward Searle.

== Crews ==
The Oxford crew weighed an average of 11 st 11.25 lb (74.8 kg), 1.25 pounds (0.6 kg) per rower more than their Light Blue opposition. Cambridge saw the return of five former Blues, including the cox Francis Archer and number four Robert Kinglake, both of whom had represented the university twice before. Three of Oxford's crew had rowed in the previous year's race.

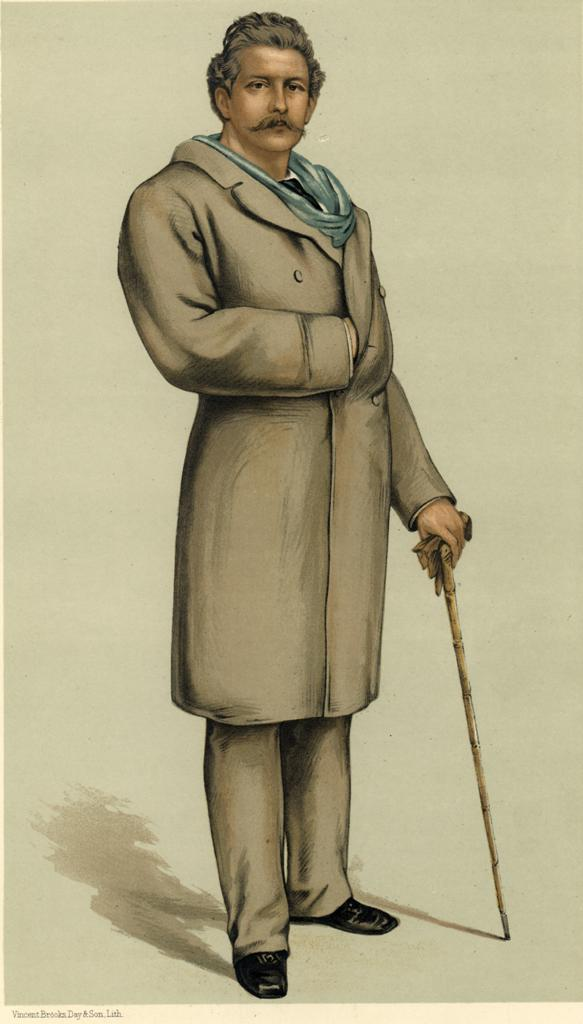
Charles Bennett Lawes rowed at a stroke for Cambridge.

Seat	Cambridge			Oxford		
Seat	Name	College	Weight	Name	College	Weight
Bow	H. Watney	Lady Margaret Boat Club	11 st 1 lb	R. T. Raikes	Merton	11 st 0 lb
2	M. H. L. Beebee	Lady Margaret Boat Club	10 st 12 lb	H. P. Senhouse	Christ Church	11 st 1 lb
3	E. V. Pigott	Corpus Christi	11 st 12 lb	E. F. Henley	Oriel	12 st 13 lb
4	R. A. Kinglake	3rd Trinity	12 st 8 lb	G. C. Coventry	Pembroke	11 st 12 lb
5	D. F. Steavenson	Trinity Hall	12 st 4 lb	A. Morrison (P)	Balliol	12 st 6 lb
6	G. Borthwick	1st Trinity	11 st 13 lb	T. Wood	Pembroke	12 st 2 lb
7	W. R. Griffiths	3rd Trinity	11 st 8.5 lb	H. Schneider	Trinity	11 st 10 lb
Stroke	C. B. Lawes	3rd Trinity	11 st 7 lb	M. Brown	Trinity	11 st 4 lb
Cox	F. H. Archer	Corpus Christi	7 st 3 lb	C. R. W. Tottenham	Christ Church	7 st 13 lb
Source: (P) – boat club president (J. G. Chambers was the non-rowing president of Cambridge University Boat Club)

== Race ==
The Championship Course along which the Boat Race is contested

Both crews had initially returned to the boathouses upon the instruction of their boat club president's who had demanded the steamers stay behind the start. Oxford won the toss and elected to start from the Middlesex station, handing the Surrey side of the river to Cambridge. Following an indifferent start from both crews, Cambridge took the lead, and were a length ahead by Bishop's Creek. To avoid the steamers pressing from behind, the Light Blue cox Archer steered his boat to the middle of the river, while his counterpart, Charles Tottenham, manoeuvred too close to the bank, resulting in a two-length lead for Cambridge by Craven Cottage. By the Crab Tree pub, the lead was three lengths. Despite dominating the race, by the time the crews passed below Hammersmith Bridge, Oxford had reduced the lead to three-quarters of a length, and at The Doves pub, the lead was down to half a length.

Soon after the Oxford boat overlapped their opponents yet Cambridge pushed away again before Chiswick Eyot where the Dark Blues once began to overlap the Light Blues' stern. Cambridge's stroke Lawes reacted and pushed to keep the lead, but by Chiswick Church the crews were level. Oxford's better line in the river saw them draw away rapidly from Cambridge, whereupon the Light Blues were regarded as "falling to pieces". Oxford's lead at Barnes Bridge was around three lengths, and by the time they passed the finishing line they had won by four lengths in a time of 21 minutes 24 seconds, securing the Dark Blue's fifth consecutive win and taking the overall record to 12–10 in their favour. Drinkwater suggested that, of the 22 races conducted thus far, it was "one of the most sensational races in this history", while Burnell described it as a "splendid race".
