= Robert Kinglake =

English rower and barrister

Robert Alexander Kinglake (9 June 1843 – 10 June 1915) was an English rower and barrister.

Kinglake was born at Taunton. He was the second son of John Alexander Kinglake, MP for Rochester, and his wife Louisa Rebecca Liddon, daughter of John Liddon of Taunton. He was educated at Eton and Trinity College, Cambridge. Kinglake rowed in the Cambridge boat in the Boat Races of 1863, 1864, 1865 and 1866, all of which were won by Oxford. He was president of Cambridge University Boat Club in 1866. In 1864 he won the Silver Goblets at Henley Royal Regatta partnering John Richardson Selwyn.

Kinglake was admitted at the Inner Temple in November 1865 and was called to the bar on 17 November 1868. He was on the Western Circuit, and was Recorder of Penzance from 1883 to 1899 and of Bournemouth from 1899 to 1915.

Kinglake later lived at Moushill Manor, Milford, Surrey. He died at Harrogate at the age of 72.

== See also ==
- List of Cambridge University Boat Race crews
