= The Boat Race 1841 =

5th Boat Race
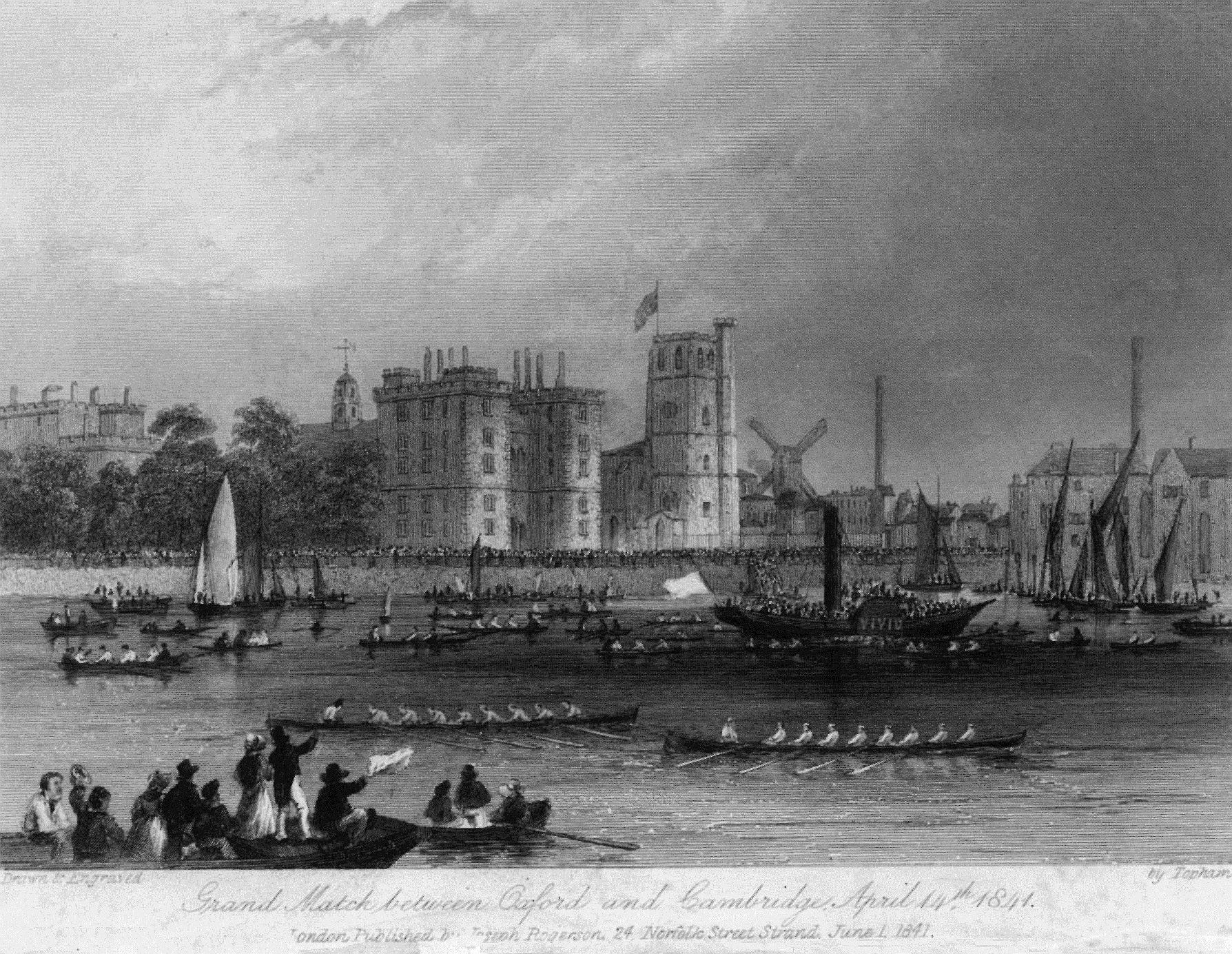
- The Boat Race of 1841
- Date: 14 April 1841
- Winner: Cambridge
- Margin of victory: 22 lengths
- Winning time: 32 minutes 30 seconds
- Overall record (Cambridge–Oxford): 4–1
- Umpire: R. G. Walls (Oxford); T. S. Egan (Cambridge); Mr Antrobus (referee)

The 5th Boat Race took place on the River Thames on 14 April 1841. It was the fourth of the University Boat Races, a side-by-side rowing competition between the University of Oxford and the University of Cambridge, to be contested in London. The race was held between Westminster Bridge and Putney Bridge and was won by Cambridge, whose crew featured two pairs of brothers rowing, who defeated Oxford by a distance of 22 lengths in a time of 32 minutes and 30 seconds. The victory took the overall record in the event to 4–1 in Cambridge's favour.

== Background ==
The Boat Race is a side-by-side rowing competition between the University of Oxford (sometimes referred to as the "Dark Blues") and the University of Cambridge (sometimes referred to as the "Light Blues"). The race was first held in 1829, and takes place on the River Thames in southwest London. Cambridge went into the race as reigning champions, having won the previous year's race by three-quarters of a length.

There was some disagreement over the day selected for the race, mainly in an attempt to coincide with a suitable tide. The Cambridge cox for the 1839 race, Thomas Selby Egan, along with Oxford's R. G. Walls were umpires for the race along with referee Edmund Antrobus from St John's College, Cambridge. Both universities rowed in boats constructed by Searle of Stangate; the vessels were "justly and generally admired", the only significant difference between them being that Oxford's boat was carvel built while Cambridge's was clinker built. The race took place on a five-and-three-quarter-mile (9.2 km) stretch of the Thames between Westminster Bridge and Putney Bridge. No arrangements had been made for the police to keep the course clear: according to Cambridge's number seven George Denman "it was often ticklish work for the coxswains to decide whether to go ahead or astern of a train of barges catering across the river". According to a report in The Morning Chronicle, "both crews ... have agreed that the match will be off if any of the steamers attempt to lead".

Oxford arrived at the Thames fifteen days prior the race, and rowed the full course; Cambridge started their practice runs four days later, often racing against a crew from the Cambridge Subscription Room (who subsequently won the Grand Challenge Cup at the Henley Royal Regatta). George Denman suffered an injury during practice, struck "by a tremendous blow on the shoulder" which was all but cured by the application of "just one leech". Oxford's crew was not settled until three days before the race, when they competed against a crew from Leander Club.

== Crews ==
The Cambridge crew weighed an average of 11 st 4.625 lb (71.8 kg), 0.5 pounds (0.2 kg) per rower more than their Dark Blue opposition. Cambridge's crew contained three Blues: John Matthew Ridley, Francis Penrose and Charles Marsh Vialls, all of whom had rowed in the previous year's race. Similarly, Oxford saw the return of four members with Boat Race experience: Jacob G. Mountain, E. Royds, G. Meynell and J. J. T. Somers-Cocks. For the first time in the history of the race, two pairs of brothers rowed for Cambridge, the Crokers (Joseph and William) and the Denmans (George and Lewis).

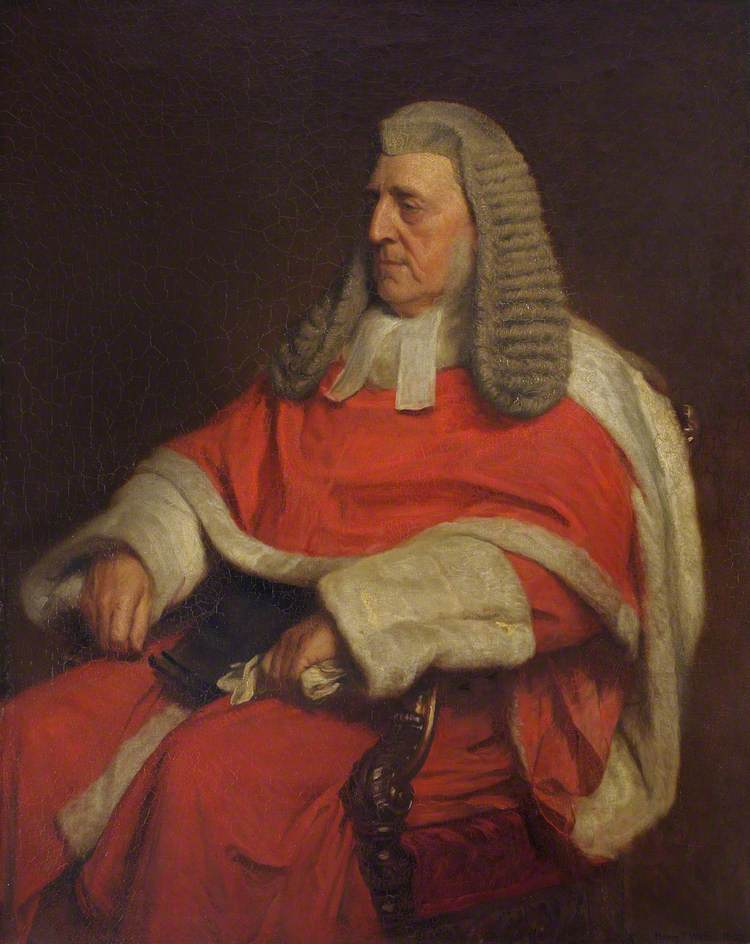
George Denman rowed at number seven for Cambridge.

Seat	Cambridge			Oxford		
Seat	Name	College	Weight	Name	College	Weight
Bow	W. Croker	Gonville and Caius	9 st 12 lb	Richard Bethell	Exeter	10 st 6 lb
2	Hon. L. Denman	Magdalene	10 st 12 lb	Ed. Vaughan Richards	Christ Church	11 st 2 lb
3	A. M. Ritchie	1st Trinity	11 st 10 lb	J. G. Mountain	Merton	10 st 9 lb
4	J. M. Ridley	Jesus	12 st 7 lb	E. Royds	Brasenose	11 st 13 lb
5	R. H. Cobbold	Peterhouse	12 st 4 lb	H. Wm. Hodgson	Balliol	11 st 10 lb
6	F. C. Penrose	Magdalene	12 st 0 lb	Wm. Lea	Brasenose	11 st 7 lb
7	Hon. G. Denman	1st Trinity	10 st 7 lb	G. Meynell	Brasenose	11 st 11 lb
Stroke	C. M. Vialls (P)	3rd Trinity	11 st 7 lb	J. J. T. Somers-Cocks (P)	Brasenose	11 st 3 lb
Cox	J. M. Croker	Gonville and Caius	10 st 8 lb	Charles B. Woolaston	Exeter	9 st 2 lb
Source: (P) – boat club president

== Race ==
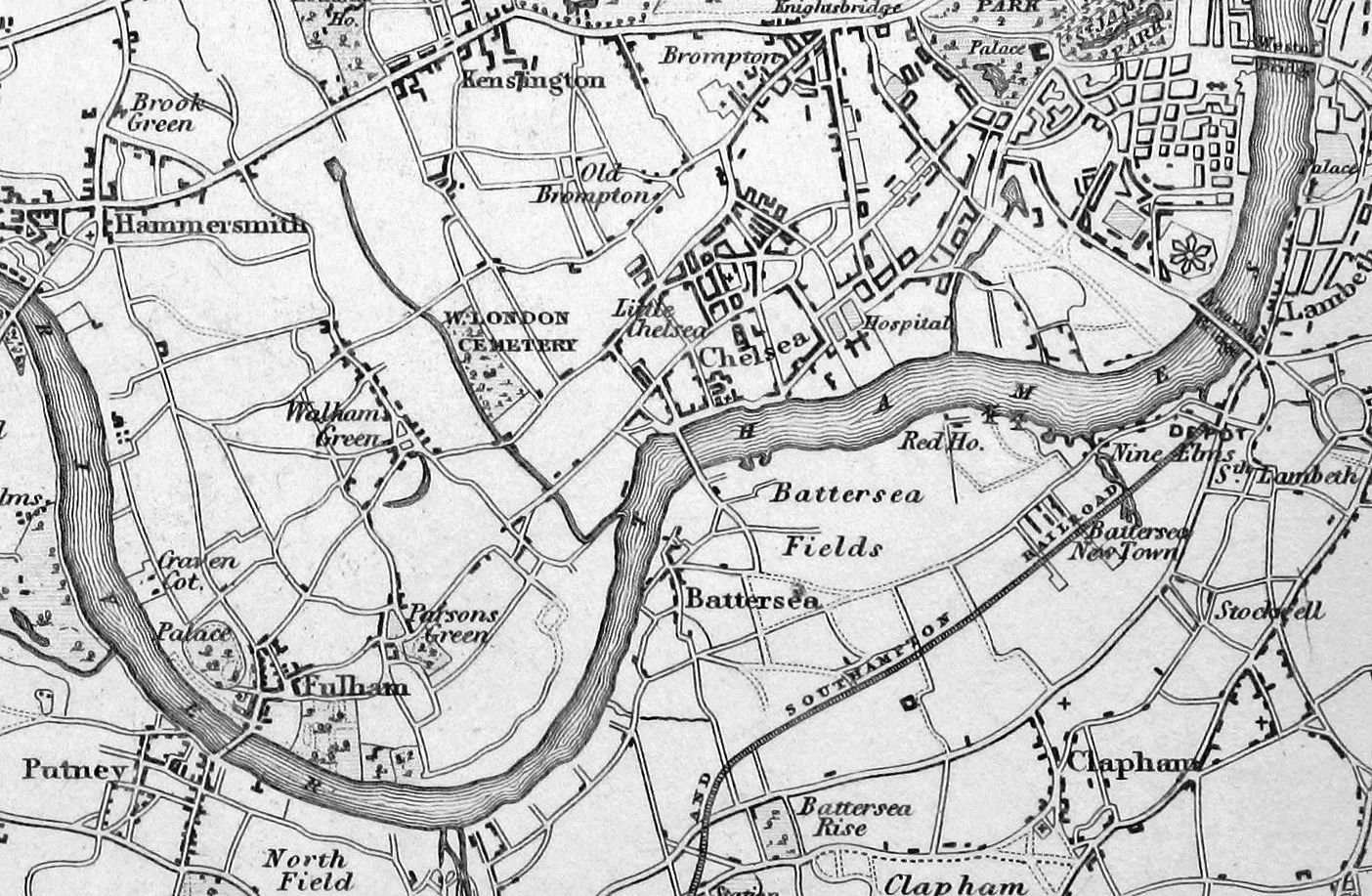
The 1841 race took place between Westminster and Putney bridges.

Cambridge were considered favourites for the race, mainly as they had won the previous three races on the Thames. The Light Blues won the toss and elected to start at the first arch from the centre of Westminster Bridge on the Surrey side, Oxford from the next arch along. The race commenced at 6:10 p.m., with the Light Blues making the better start, taking an early lead, and getting clear by Lambeth. A lead of at least two lengths by Vauxhall Bridge was extended to around six lengths by Battersea Bridge.

Cambridge won by 22 lengths in a time of 32 minutes 30 seconds. It was their fourth consecutive victory and took the overall record to 4–1 in their favour. Despite earlier fears, "the steamers were well managed, and offered no obstruction to the boats".
