= William Garnett (cricketer) =

English cricketer

Personal information
- Full name: William Bishton Garnett
- Born: 27 June 1816; Nantwich, Cheshire, England
- Died: 11 January 1903 (aged 86); Shifnal, Shropshire, England
- Batting: Unknown

Domestic team information
- Years: Team
- 1839: Oxford University

Career statistics
Competition	First-class
Matches	1
Runs scored	22
Batting average	11.00
100s/50s	–/–
Top score	12
Catches/stumpings	1/–
- Source: Cricinfo, 9 March 2020

William Bishton Garnett (27 June 1816 – 11 January 1903) was an English first-class cricketer and clergyman.

The son of The Reverend William Garnett senior, he was born at Nantwich in June 1817. He was educated at Shrewsbury School, before matriculating at Brasenose College, Oxford in 1835, graduating B.A. in 1840 and M.A. in 1853. While studying at Oxford, he made a single appearance in first-class cricket for Oxford University against the Marylebone Cricket Club at Oxford in 1839. Batting twice in the match, Garnett was dismissed for 10 runs by William Bonsey in the Oxford first-innings, while in their second-innings he was dismissed for 12 runs by James Cobbett. Garnett was also a member of the Oxford University Boat Club and was a cox for the Oxford team in the 1840 Boat Race.

After graduating from Oxford, Garnett took holy orders in the Church of England, becoming a preacher at Bunbury from 1853–63, and was later a justice of the peace for both Montgomeryshire and Shropshire. He changed his name by royal license to William Bishton Garnett Botfield in 1863, following the death of his cousin Beriah Botfield who had died without issue. Garnett died at Shifnal in January 1903.
