= The Boat Race 1862 =

19th Boat Race
- Date: 12 April 1862
- Winner: Oxford
- Margin of victory: 10 lengths
- Winning time: 24 minutes 34 seconds
- Overall record (Cambridge–Oxford): 10–9
- Umpire: Joseph William Chitty (Oxford)

The 19th Boat Race between crews from the University of Oxford and the University of Cambridge took place on the River Thames on 12 April 1862. Oxford won by 10 lengths in a time of 24 minutes and 34 seconds, taking the overall record to 10–9 in Cambridge's favour.

== Background ==
The Boat Race is a side-by-side rowing competition between the University of Oxford (sometimes referred to as the "Dark Blues") and the University of Cambridge (sometimes referred to as the "Light Blues"). The race was first held in 1829, and since 1845 has taken place on the 4.2-mile (6.8 km) Championship Course on the River Thames in southwest London. The rivalry is a major point of honour between the two universities and followed throughout the United Kingdom and worldwide. Oxford went into the race as reigning champions, having won the 1861 race by sixteen lengths, with Cambridge leading overall with ten victories to Oxford's eight.

Both University crews were downselected from trials eights, with varied success. The Cambridge crew set a record time during practice, while Oxford "were in very rough condition". Just one former Blues returned to the crew, instead of the four who had been expected. Morale was so low in the Dark Blue camp that it was suggested that they write to Cambridge claiming that they could not assemble a crew. The Oxford University Boat Club president and coach George Morrison refused this course of action and the race was set for 12 April 1862.

The boats were built by J. and S. Salter of Oxford. The race was umpired by Joseph William Chitty who had rowed for Oxford twice in 1849 (in the March and December races) and the 1852 race, while the starter was Edward Searle.

== Crews ==
The Oxford crew weighed an average of 11 st 11.375 lb (74.8 kg), 12.25 pounds (5.6 kg) per rower more than their Light Blue opposition. Poole and Hoare returned for the Oxford crew while Cambridge's crew featured three returning Blues in Robert Fitzgerald, Henry Collings and George Richards.

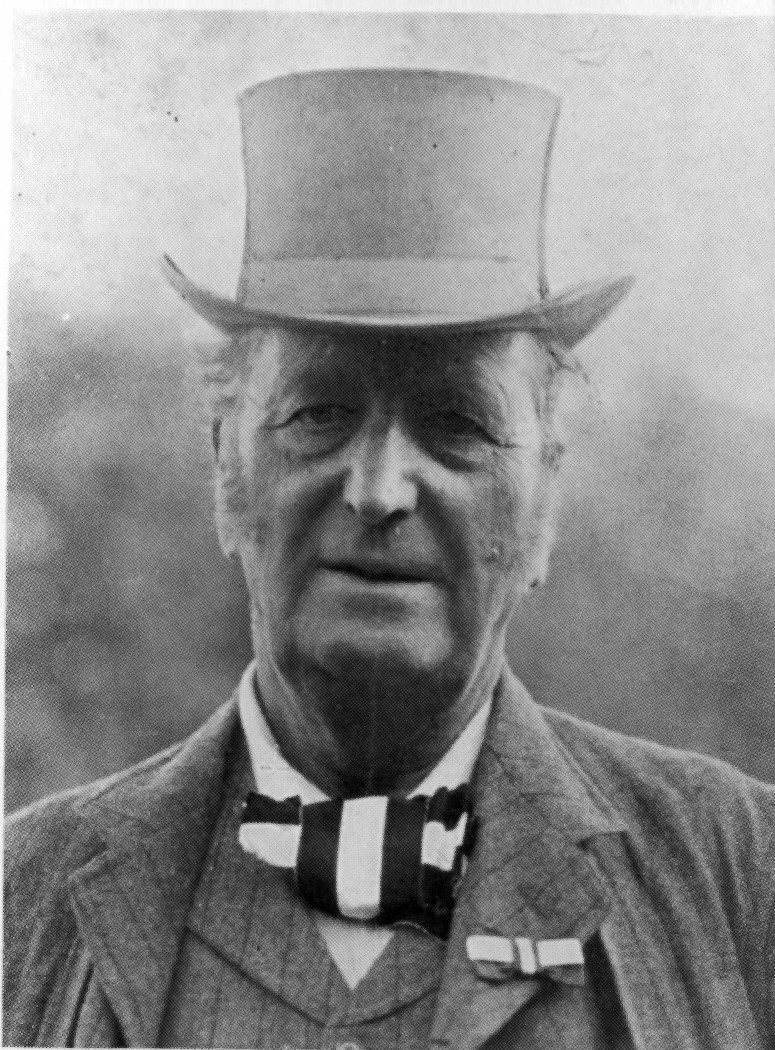
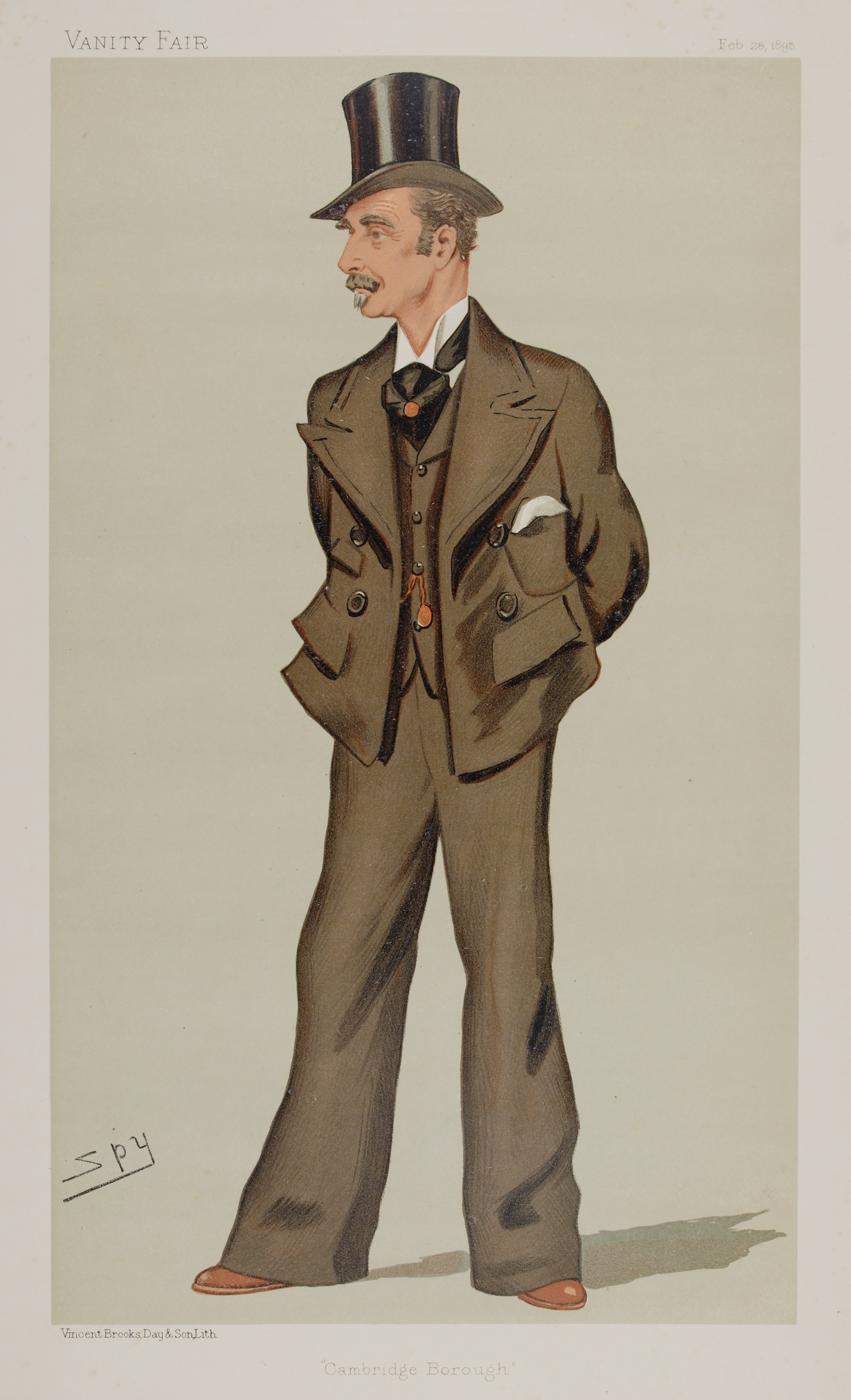
Walter Bradford Woodgate (left) rowed at bow for Oxford while Robert Uniacke-Penrose-Fitzgerald (right) occupied the five seat for Cambridge.

Seat	Cambridge			Oxford		
Seat	Name	College	Weight	Name	College	Weight
Bow	P. F. Gorst	Lady Margaret Boat Club	10 st 4 lb	W. B. Woodgate	Brasenose	11 st 6 lbs
2	J. G. Chambers	3rd Trinity	11 st 5 lb	O. S. Wynne	Christ Church	11 st 3 lb
3	E. Sanderson	Corpus Christi	10 st 10 lb	W. B. R. Jacobson	Christ Church	12 st 4 lb
4	W. C. Smyly	1st Trinity	11 st 5 lb	R. E. L. Burton	Christ Church	12 st 5 lb
5	R. U. P. Fitzgerald	Trinity Hall	11 st 3 lb	A. Morrison	Balliol	12 st 8.5 lb
6	H. H. Collings	3rd Trinity	11 st 2 lb	A. R. Poole	Trinity	12 st 5 lb
7	J. G. Buchanan	1st Trinity	10 st 12 lb	C. R. Carr	Wadham	11 st 2.5 lb
Stroke	G. H. Richards (P)	1st Trinity	10 st 5 lb	W. M. Hoare	Exeter	11 st 1 lb
Cox	F. H. Archer	Corpus Christi	5 st 2 lb	F. Hopwood	Christ Church	7 st 3 lb
Source: (P) – boat club president (G. Morrison was Oxford's non-rowing president)

== Race ==
The Championship Course, along which the race is conducted

Weather conditions on the day of the race were described as "excessively cold" with "a smart breeze" although "the sun shone brilliantly." Oxford won the toss and elected to start from the Middlesex station, handing the Surrey side of the river to Cambridge. The Light Blues took an early lead but Oxford were soon level with them by the time they passed the Star and Garter pub. With the steadier stroke, Oxford took the lead and were clear of Cambridge by Craven Cottage. They extended their lead further, to such an extent that even though the Light Blue cox Richards made a spurt at the Soap Works, his boat had been surrounded by the steamers, and overtaken by one. The disruption from steamers would become so severe that in the 1864 race, both boat club presidents threatened to postpone the race unless the steamers remained behind the two crews.

The Dark Blues held a three-length advantage by the time they shot Hammersmith Bridge, and despite another spurt from Cambridge off Chiswick Eyot, the lead had extended to at least 100 yards (91 m) by Barnes Bridge. Oxford won by 10 lengths in a time of 24 minutes 34 seconds. It was their third win in four years and secured Oxford's ninth win in the event compared to Cambridge's ten. Contemporary rower and author William MacMichael suggested: "Of these two crews it is scarcely necessary to say more than that if they did not reach the consummate excellence of some which we have been accustomed to look back upon as the highest standard of form and beauty, they were yet a good average specimen of University rowing."
