= The Boat Race 1854 =

12th Boat Race
- Date: 8 April 1854
- Winner: Oxford
- Margin of victory: 7 lengths
- Winning time: 25 minutes 29 seconds
- Overall record (Cambridge–Oxford): 7–5
- Umpire: C. J. Selwyn

The 12th Boat Race took place on the River Thames on 8 April 1854. Typically held annually, the event is a side-by-side rowing race between crews from the Universities of Oxford and Cambridge. The race was won by Oxford who triumphed over Cambridge by seven lengths.

== Background ==
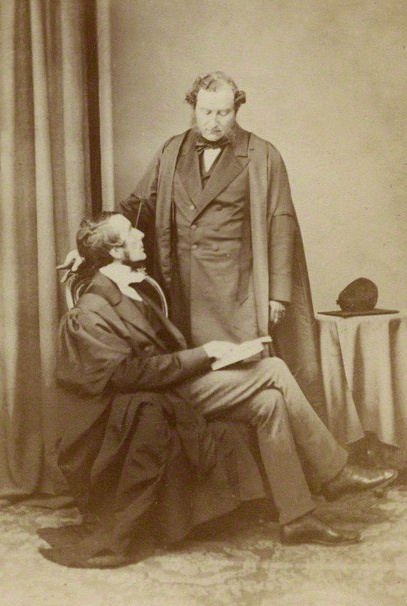
Sir Charles Jasper Selwyn (standing) was the umpire for the fifth time.

The Boat Race is a side-by-side rowing competition between the University of Oxford (sometimes referred to as the "Dark Blues") and the University of Cambridge (sometimes referred to as the "Light Blues"). The race was first held in 1829, and since 1845 has taken place on the 4.2-mile (6.8 km) Championship Course on the River Thames in southwest London. Oxford went into the race as reigning champions, having defeated Cambridge by nine lengths in the previous race. Cambridge led overall with seven wins to Oxford's four.

There was no Boat Race in 1853 as the Henley Royal Regatta was scheduled for the same time as that proposed by Cambridge in their challenge to Oxford. The universities did however race each other that year, in the Grand Challenge Cup, which was won by Oxford. On 11 February 1854, a challenge was sent to Oxford by the former Light Blue cox Thomas Selby Egan, who had assumed temporary captaincy of Cambridge University Boat Club, despite having coached the Dark Blues to victory in the 1852 race.

Although Oxford arrived at Putney as favourites to win the race, Cambridge's style was enough to force the odds to evens. However, in a practice race, the Dark Blues defeated a watermen scratch crew easily and restored their position as pre-race favourites. Both crews rowed in 65-foot (20 m) long boats manufactured by Searle. The umpire for the race was Charles Jasper Selwyn and the starter was Edward Searle.

== Crews ==
The Oxford crew weighed an average of 11 st 1 lb (70.1 kg), 5.75 pounds (2.6 kg) per rower more than their opponents. Cambridge saw one rower return from the 1852 race in F. Johnson, while Oxford's crew contained two former Blues in Nind and the Oxford University Boat Club president Olliver Meade King.

Seat	Cambridge			Oxford		
Seat	Name	College	Weight	Name	College	Weight
Bow	R. C. Galton	1st Trinity	9 st 10 lb	W. F. Short	New College	10 st 5 lb
2	Spencer Nairne	Emmanuel	10 st 2 lb	Alfred Hooke	Worcester	11 st 0 lb
3	J. Coope Davis	3rd Trinity	11 st 1 lb	W. Pinckney	Exeter	11 st 2 lb
4	S. Agnew	1st Trinity	10 st 12 lb	T. H. Blundell	Christ Church	11 st 8 lb
5	E. Courage	1st Trinity	11 st 13 lb	Edward Hooper	Pembroke	11 st 5 lb
6	F. W. Johnson	3rd Trinity	10 st 13 lb	P. H. Nind	Christ Church	10 st 12 lb
7	H. Blake	Corpus Christi	11 st 1 lb	G. L. Mellish	Exeter	11 st 2 lb
Stroke	J. Wright	Lady Margaret	10 st 2 lb	W. Olliver Meade King (P)	Pembroke	11 st 8 lb
Cox	C. T. Smith	Gonville and Caius	9 st 12 lb	T. H. Marshall	Exeter	10 st 3 lb
Source: (P) – boat club president

== Race ==
The Championship Course along which the Boat Race is competed

Oxford were pre-race favourites. They won the toss and elected to start from the Middlesex station, handing Cambridge the Surrey side of the river. The race commenced at 10.40 a.m., with Oxford pulling away from the start. The Dark Blues were clear of Cambridge by the time the crews reached the Crab Tree. By Hammersmith Bridge both coxes were forced to take evasive action as a result of a barge blocking their route. With a lead of two lengths after the bridge, Oxford continued to increase their lead, eventually passing the flag-boat with a seven-length advantage in a time of 25 minutes 29 seconds. It was their third consecutive victory and took the overall record to 7–5 in Cambridge's favour.

In a speech in the evening's celebrations, Charles Selwyn, who had umpired this and the previous four Boat Races, declared that he was "no longer young and active enough" to continue to act in the capacity of umpire; he would be replaced in 1856 by W. G. Rich, the former Cambridge University Boat Club president who had rowed in both the March and December races of 1849.
