= Thomas Selby Egan =

Thomas Selby Egan (25 December 1814 – 11 May 1893) was a coxswain, a rowing coach, and a German scholar. As a coxswain for Cambridge University, he coxed the first Cambridge boat to win The Boat Race.

Egan was born in London, the son of John Egan. He was admitted to Gonville and Caius College, Cambridge on 29 June 1833. In his college days at Cambridge he was cox for the winning Cambridge boat in the Boat Races in 1836, 1839 and 1840 and was well known as an "aquatic coach". In 1841 and 1842 he coxed the Cambridge Subscription Rooms eight which won the Grand Challenge Cup at Henley Royal Regatta. Egan was an umpire at Henley Regatta for 12 years and was an editor of Bell's Life in London for many years.

Egan criticised the use of watermen as coaches, advocating the longer and smoother stroke of amateurs rather than the waterman's choppy stroke. When Cambridge insisted on using a waterman as coach in the 1852 race, Egan in protest trained the Oxford crew which went on to win. He coached the Cambridge crew in the 1854 race, both crews in the 1856 race and the Cambridge crew in the 1858 race. In 1865 a lifeboat was presented to the lifeboat station at Tramore, Southern Ireland, called the Thomas Egan.

Egan was a German scholar and translated Schiller's Don Carlos, Infant of Spain, Heine's Börne, and other poems.

Egan died at 42, Marine Terrace, Margate, Kent, the home of Mrs. Harriette Mary Powell, with whom he lodged for a number of years, at the age of 78, and was buried in Margate Cemetery.

== See also ==
- List of Cambridge University Boat Race crews
