= The Boat Race 1839 =

3rd Boat Race
- Date: 3 April 1839
- Winner: Cambridge
- Margin of victory: 35 lengths
- Winning time: 31 minutes
- Overall record (Cambridge–Oxford): 2–1
- Umpire: C. B. Wollaston (Oxford); C. J. Selwyn (Cambridge); W. H. Harrison (referee)

The 3rd Boat Race took place on the River Thames on 3 April 1839. It was the second of the University Boat Races to be held on the River Thames, this time between Westminster and Putney. Cambridge had competed against Leander Club in 1837 and 1838; it had been three years since Oxford and Cambridge raced against one another. Representatives of both universities and an independent referee oversaw the proceedings. Cambridge won the race by 35 lengths, as of 2023 the largest winning margin in the history of the event.

== Background ==
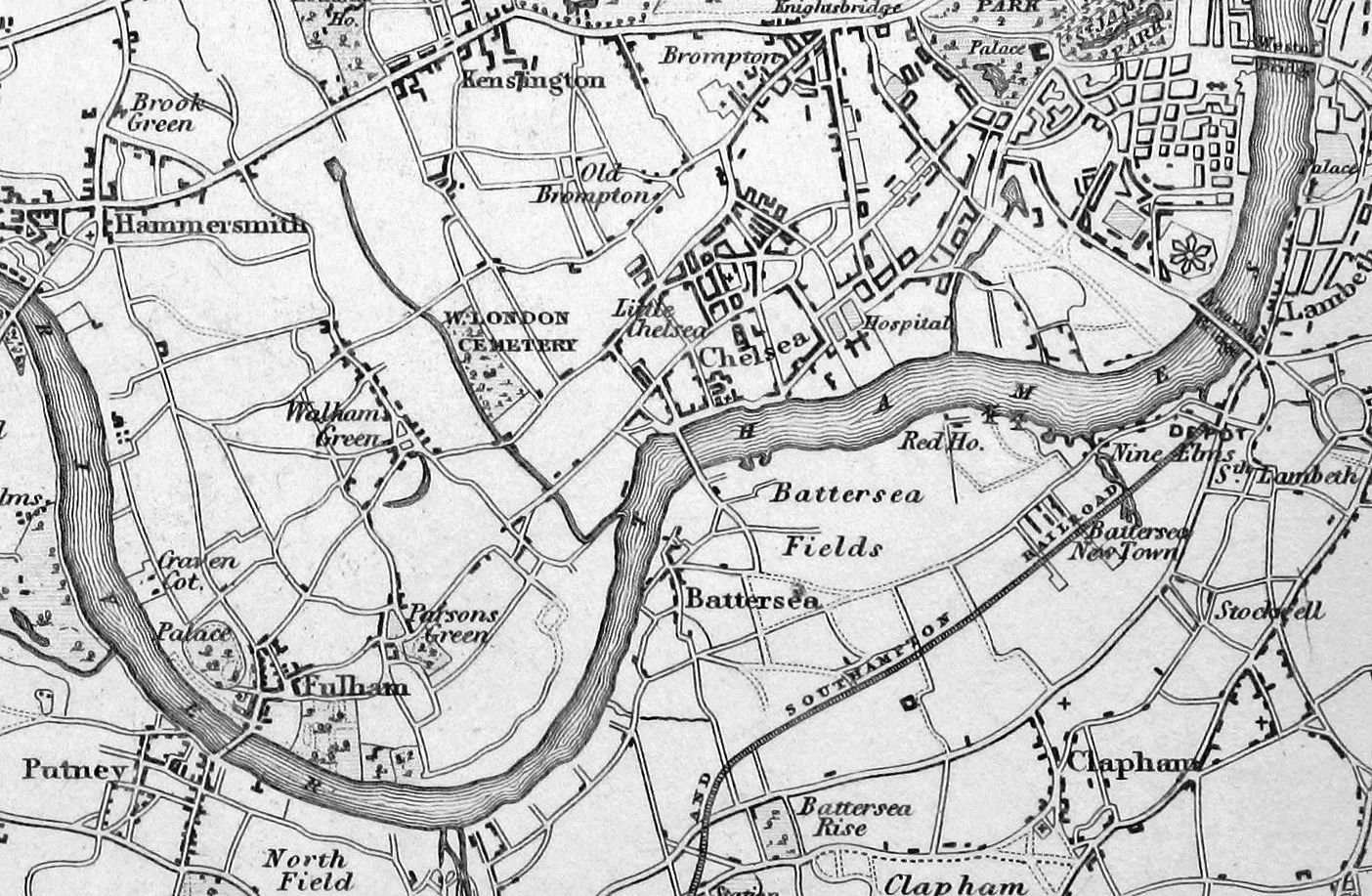
The 1839 race took place between Westminster and Putney bridges.

The Boat Race is a side-by-side rowing competition between the University of Oxford (sometimes referred to as the "Dark Blues") and the University of Cambridge (sometimes referred to as the "Light Blues"). The race was first held in 1829, and takes place on the River Thames in southwest London. No race between the two universities was held in 1837 or 1838, instead Cambridge raced against Leander Club those years. The umpires for the race were C. B. Wollaston (for Oxford) and C. J. Selwyn (for Cambridge), while W. H. Harrison acted as referee.

Cambridge's boat was constructed by Searle of Stangate, while Oxford's "beautifully constructed" vessel was built by King of Oxford. The race was scheduled to take place on a five-and-three-quarter-mile stretch between Westminster Bridge and Putney Bridge. Oxford were trained by a Thames waterman while Cambridge were guided by their cox, Thomas Selby Egan.

== Crews ==
The Oxford crew weighed an average of 11 st 10.5 lb (74.4 kg) per rower, almost 10 pounds (4.5 kg) more per man than their opponents. None of the Oxford crew from the 1836 featured in this year's race; however, both the stroke Edmund Stanley and cox Egan returned for Cambridge, the former being described by Bell's Life as "really terrific, one of the severest we ever saw". Oxford's boat club president was Calverley Bewicke who rowed at stroke for the Dark Blues, while Cambridge had a non-rowing president in Augustus Granville.

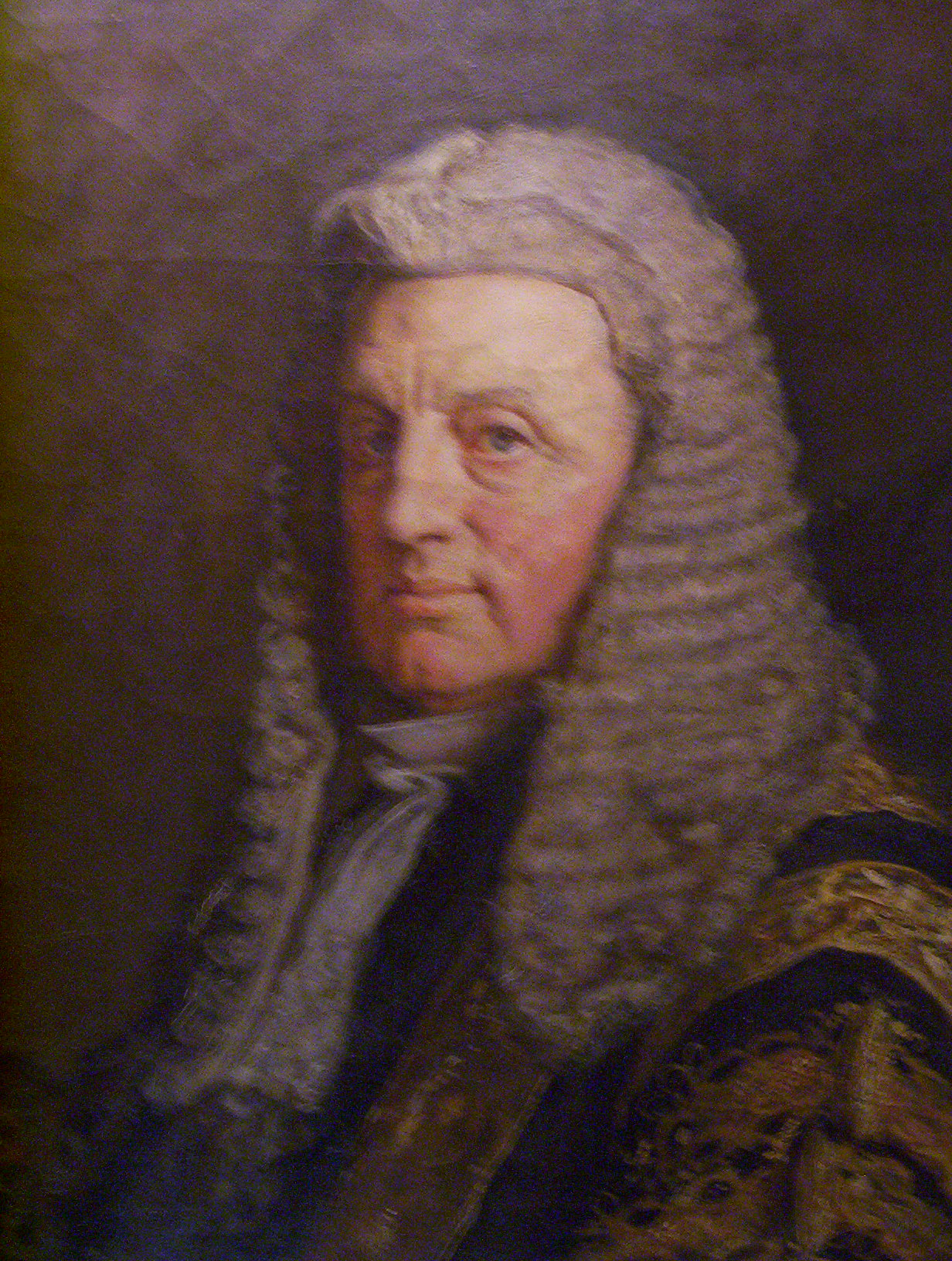
William Baliol Brett rowed at number seven for Cambridge.

| Seat | Cambridge | | | Oxford | | |
| Seat | Name | College | Weight | Name | College | Weight |
|---|---|---|---|---|---|---|
| Bow | Alfred Hudson Shadwell | Lady Margaret | 10 st 7 lb | Stanlake Lee | Queen's | 10 st 4 lb |
| 2 | Warington W. Smyth | 2nd Trinity | 11 st 0 lb | Berdmore Compton | Merton | 11 st 5 lb |
| 3 | J. Abercrombie | Gonville & Caius | 10 st 7 lb | Samuel Edward Maberly | Christ Church | 11 st 4 lb |
| 4 | A. Paris | Corpus Christi | 11 st 4 lb | Wm. Jas. Garnett | Christ Church | 12 st 10 lb |
| 5 | C. T. Penrose | 1st Trinity | 12 st 0 lb | R. G. Walls | Brasenose | 13 st 0 lb |
| 6 | W. H. Yatman ‡ | Gonville & Caius | 10 st 10 lb | R. Hobhouse | Balliol | 12 st 0 lb |
| 7 | W. B. Brett | Gonville & Caius | 12 st 0 lb | Philip Lybbe Powys | Balliol | 12 st 0 lb |
| Stroke | E. Stanley | Jesus | 10 st 6 lb | Calverley Bewicke (P) | University | 12 st 0 lb |
| Cox | T. S. Egan | Gonville & Caius | 9 st 0 lb | Woodforde Ffooks | Exeter | 10 st 2 lb |
Source: (P) – boat club president ‡ – Yatman replaced Vialls of Trinity College through illness two days before the race

== Race ==
[Cambridge] wore white guernseys and white straw hats with light blue ribbons, the steerer having a rosette of the same colour on his breast. The Oxonians wore dark blue guernseys with white stripes, dark straw hats with dark blue ribbons.

— MacMichael

The umpires for the race were Charles Woolaston and C. J. Selwyn, while W. Harrison Esq, the Commodore of the Royal Thames Yacht Club, fulfilled the position of referee. The race was held on a Wednesday, 3 April 1839, the start time of "precisely" 4.47pm, in conditions described by MacMichael as "cold, cloudy and windy, and just the very worst sort of day for an aquatic expedition". According to Bell's Life, Cambridge were slight favourites. Oxford won the toss and elected to commence closest to the Middlesex shore of the river. After a close start, the Cambridge boat started to draw away and by Vauxhall Bridge were "several boats' lengths" ahead. They increased their lead further by Battersea Bridge and shot Putney Bridge 1 minute 45 seconds ahead, and won by a margin of 35 lengths which remains, as of 2023, the largest in the history of the event. Cambridge's victory took them to an overall lead in the event of 2–1.
