= The Boat Race 1840 =

4th Boat Race
- Date: 15 April 1840
- Winner: Cambridge
- Margin of victory: 3/4 length
- Winning time: 29 minutes 3 seconds
- Overall record (Cambridge–Oxford): 3–1
- Umpire: C. Bewicke (Oxford); C. J. Selwyn (Cambridge); W. H. Harrison (referee)

The 4th Boat Race took place on the River Thames on 15 April 1840. It was the third of the University Boat Races to be held on the Thames, between Westminster Bridge and Putney Bridge. Oxford University Boat Club was formed to assist in the selection of the Oxford crew. Nevertheless, Cambridge won the race by three-quarters of a length to lead the overall record at 3–1.

== Background ==
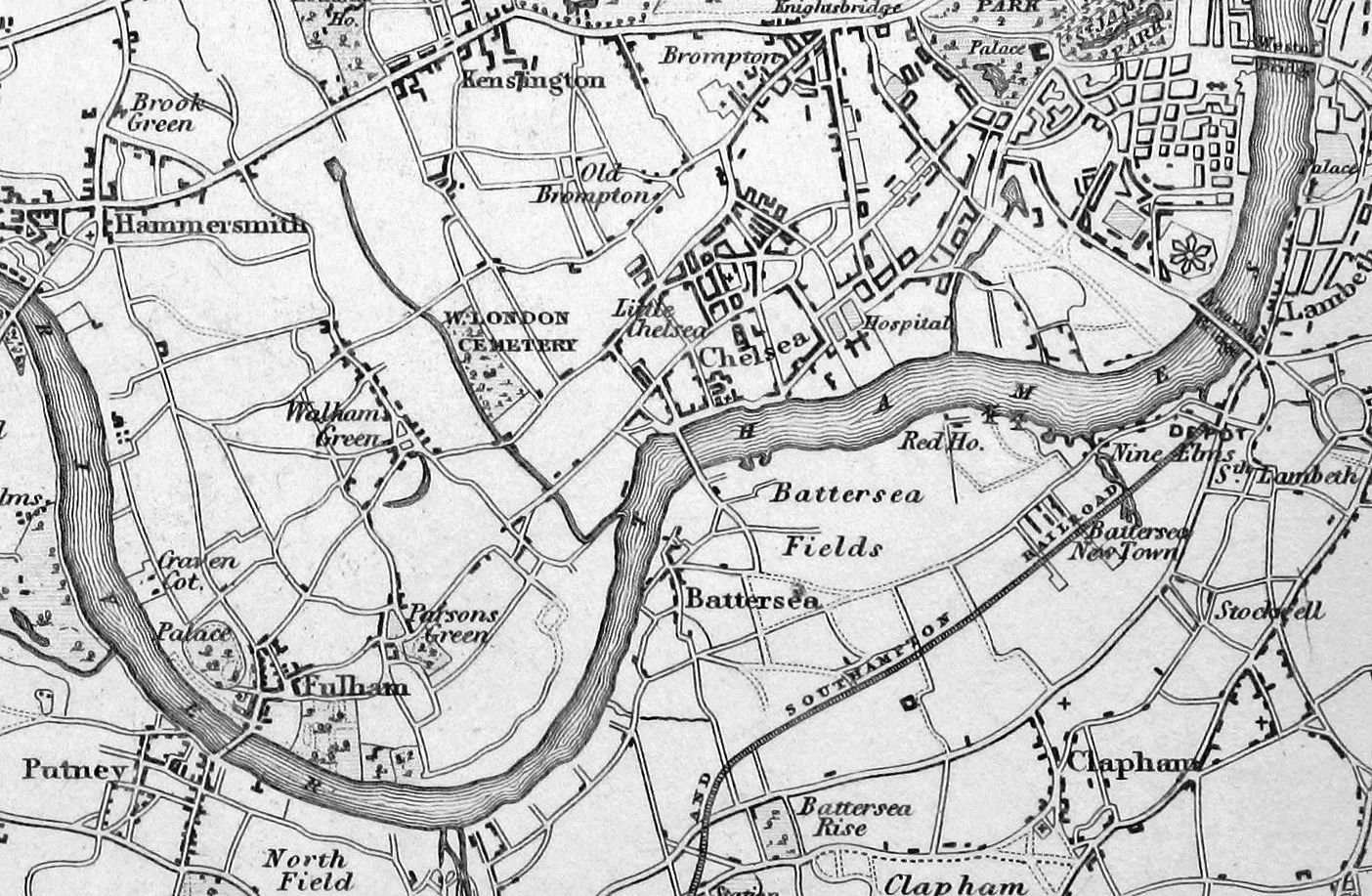
The 1840 race took place between Westminster and Putney bridges.

The Boat Race is a side-by-side rowing competition between the University of Oxford (sometimes referred to as the "Dark Blues") and the University of Cambridge (sometimes referred to as the "Light Blues"). The race was first held in 1829, and takes place on the River Thames in southwest London.

Following heavy defeats in the 1836 and 1839 races, and in order to improve the selection of the crew, Oxford University Boat Club was formed on 23 April 1839, to which anyone at the university could subscribe and which was governed by the various college boat club captains. The initial letter of challenge was delivered to Cambridge from Oxford in February. After considerable discussion, mainly about the restriction of crew selection to undergraduates only, the date of the race, 15 April 1840, was agreed sixteen days prior to the race itself. The umpires for the race were Calverley Bewicke (for Oxford) and Charles Jasper Selwyn (for Cambridge), while W. H. Harrison, the Commodore of the Royal Thames Yacht Club, was the referee. The race was to take place on a five-and-three-quarter-mile (9.2 km) stretch of the Thames between Westminster Bridge and Putney Bridge.

== Crews ==
The Oxford crew weighed an average of 11 st 10.5 lb (74.4 kg) per rower, 2.5 pounds (1.1 kg) more per man than their opponents. Cambridge saw former Blues Alfred Shadwell and cox Thomas Selby Egan return, while Oxford's crew also contained two veterans of the race, in Samuel Maberly and R. G. Walls.

Seat	Cambridge			Oxford		
Seat	Name	College	Weight	Name	College	Weight
Bow	Alfred Hudson Shadwell	Lady Margaret	10 st 7 lb	Jacob G. Mountain	Merton	11 st 0 lb
2	William Massey	1st Trinity	11 st 0 lb	I. J. J. Pocock	Merton	11 st 2 lb
3	Sam. Barnard Taylor	1st Trinity	11 st 7 lb	S. E. Maberley	Christ Church	11 st 4 lb
4	John M. Ridley	Jesus	12 st 8 lb	W. Rogers	Balliol	12 st 10 lb
5	George Charles Uppleby	Magdalene	11 st 12 lb	R. G. Walls	Brasenose	12 st 7 lb
6	Francis Cranmer Penrose	Magdalene	12 st 1 lb	E. Royds	Brasenose	12 st 4 lb
7	Heighway C. Jones	Magdalene	11 st 9 lb	Godfrey Meynell	Brasenose	11 st 10 lb
Stroke	Charles M. Vialls (P)	3rd Trinity	11 st 6 lb	J. J. T. Somers Cox (P)	Brasenose	11 st 3 lb
Cox	T. S. Egan	Gonville & Caius	9 st 0 lb	W. B. Garnett	Brasenose	9 st 7 lb
Source: (P) – boat club president

== Race ==
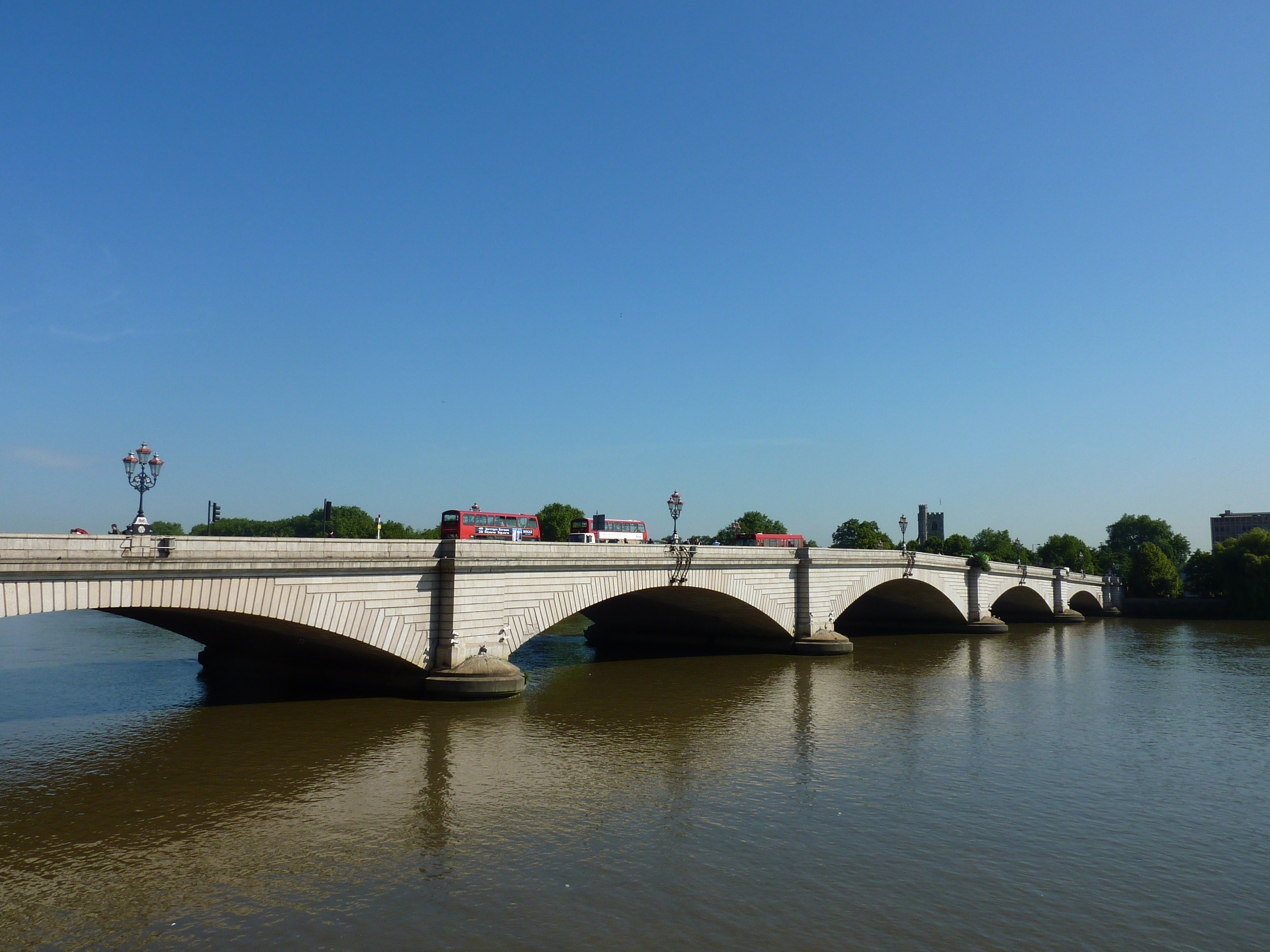
Putney Bridge marked the finish of the 1840 Boat Race.

Oxford won the toss and elected to start from the Middlesex side of the river, handing the Surrey side to Cambridge. The race commenced from below Westminster Bridge at 1.30 p.m., with Edward Searle acting as the starter. With a number of steamers blocking the route, Oxford made a good start and took an early lead. The wake of the steamers caused rough water in which both crews struggled to maintain a consistent rhythm. The lead had extended by the time the crews passed below Vauxhall Bridge and was nearly three lengths by the Spread Eagle pub. At this point Cambridge began to reduce the deficit, but following a warning from Robert Coombes who was steering the umpire's boat Dolphin, Oxford's cox Garnett steered across the path of Cambridge. The Light Blues maintained their course and Oxford were forced back again. By the Red House, Cambridge had restored parity and started to pull away. Despite suffering further rough water from the wake of another steamer at Battersea Bridge, Cambridge maintained their lead and passed through the centre arch of Putney Bridge three-quarters of a length ahead of Oxford. The winning time was 29 minutes 3 seconds, and the victory took the overall lead to 3–1 in favour of Cambridge.
