= The Boat Race 1859 =

16th Boat Race
- Date: 15 April 1859
- Winner: Oxford
- Margin of victory: Cambridge sank
- Winning time: 24 minutes 4 seconds
- Overall record (Cambridge–Oxford): 9–7
- Umpire: Joseph William Chitty (Oxford)

The 16th Boat Race took place on 15 April 1859. Held annually, the event is a side-by-side rowing race between crews from the Universities of Oxford and Cambridge along the River Thames. The race went ahead following Cambridge's request for a postponement due to extremely rough conditions being rejected. Oxford won the race after Cambridge sank. It was the first time in the history of the event that one of the crews did not finish the race.

== Background ==
The Boat Race is a side-by-side rowing competition between the University of Oxford (sometimes referred to as the "Dark Blues") and the University of Cambridge (sometimes referred to as the "Light Blues"). The race was first held in 1829, and since 1845 has taken place on the 4.2-mile (6.8 km) Championship Course on the River Thames in southwest London. Cambridge went into the race as reigning champions, having defeated Oxford by 7 1/2 lengths in the previous year's race. They led overall with nine wins to Oxford's six.

For the 1859 race, Oxford instigated a new method of crew selection: trial eights. Prior to this, the selection of crew was made on the recommendations of the college boat club captains. Oxford boat club president John Arkell remarked "it will not do to trust too much the judgment of the College captains." Following a race between the two trial eights, the final crew was selected eight weeks prior to the race. Cambridge would not introduce this selection method until the 1868 race. Oxford began training on 14 March with an outing almost every day between then and 13 April. Cambridge, on the other hand, arrived in London six days before the race and made just three outings on the Thames. The race was umpired by Joseph William Chitty who had rowed for Oxford twice in 1849 (in the March and December races) and the 1852 race.

== Crews ==
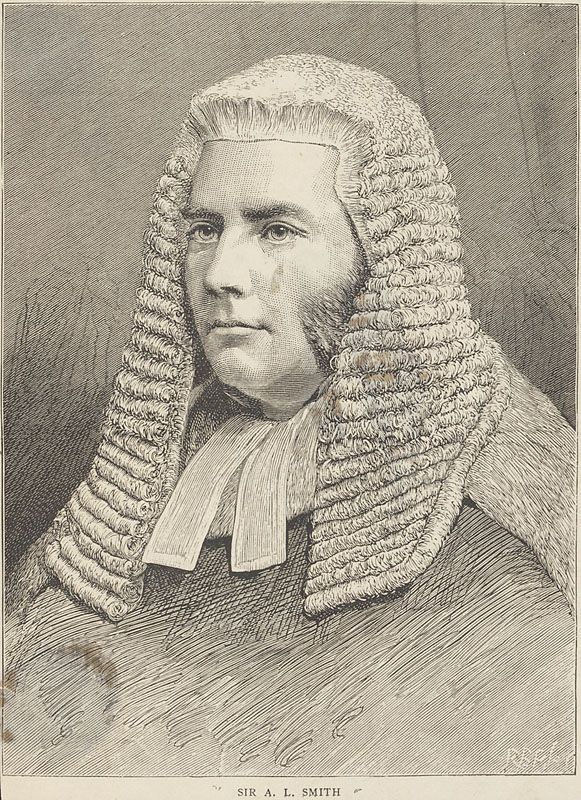
Levin Smith rowed at number three for Cambridge.

Oxford saw the return of three former Blues in Lane, Risley and Arkell, all of whom rowed in the 1858 race. Cambridge welcomed back five former rowers, including Archibald Levin Smith who had rowed in both the 1857 and 1858 races. Oxford's crew weighed an average of 11 st 8.75 lb (73.6 kg), approximately 3.25 pounds (1.47 kg) per man more than their opponents.

Seat	Cambridge			Oxford		
Seat	Name	College	Weight	Name	College	Weight
Bow	N. Royds	1st Trinity	10 st 6 lb	H. F. Baxter	Brasenose	10 st 12 lb
2	H. J. Chaytor	Jesus	10 st 13 lb	R. F. Clarke	St John's	11 st 13 lb
3	A. L. Smith	1st Trinity	11 st 11 lb	C. G. Lane	Christ Church	11 st 9 lb
4	D. Darroch	1st Trinity	12 st 4 lb	V. Lawless	Balliol	12 st 3 lb
5	H. Williams	Lady Margaret Boat Club	12 st 6 lb	G. Morrison	Balliol	13 st 1 lb
6	R. L. Lloyd (P)	Magdalene	11 st 9 lb	R. W. Risley	Exeter	11 st 2 lb
7	G. A. Paley	Lady Margaret Boat Club	11 st 7 lb	G. Thomas	Balliol	11 st 4 lb
Stroke	J. Hall	Magdalene	10 st 2 lb	J. Arkell (P)	Pembroke	10 st 12 lb
Cox	J. T. Morland	1st Trinity	9 st 0 lb	A. J. Robarts	Christ Church	9 st 1 lb
Sources: (P) – boat club president

== Race ==
The Championship Course, along which the race is conducted

The weather was inclement, with the sky overcast by heavy clouds and gale-force winds; according to a report in The Times, "it would not have been easy to pitch on a more unfavourable day for an eight-oared race". Although Cambridge were pre-race favourites, they requested a postponement because of the conditions. Oxford refused the request; Cambridge lost the toss and were handed the Surrey station for the start. The Middlesex station provided Oxford considerable relief from the rough water and wind.

Oxford's boat was heavily criticised: "it was everything but what was right", but it became quickly apparent that the Cambridge boat was too light for the conditions, and began taking on water from the moment it left the shore. Oxford made a good start and after the first mile, were two-to-three lengths ahead of Cambridge. Conditions soon worsened: some of the steamboats in the flotilla following the crews looked "bound to capsize". By Hammersmith Bridge the Cambridge boat was "ankle deep in water" and was sinking under the rough water. Oxford took the opportunity to extend their lead and pulled away from their opponents and the boats following. As Cambridge's vessel sank opposite The White Hart pub at Mortlake, some members of the crew were picked up by boats while others swam to the shore.

Oxford recorded a winning time of 24 minutes and 4 seconds and took the overall record to 9–7 in favour of Cambridge. It was the first time in the event's history that a boat sank.
