= Temple Footbridge =

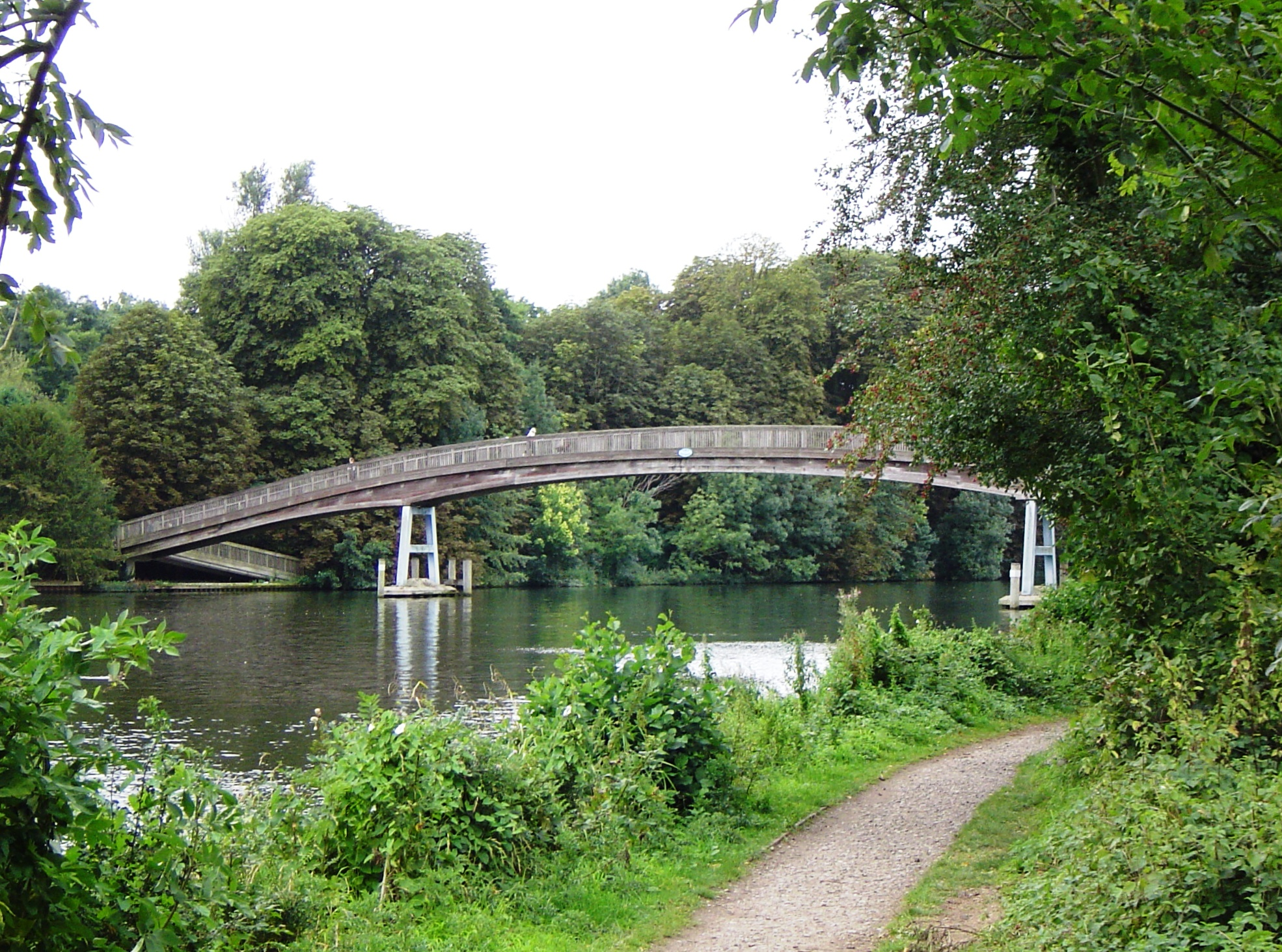
- Temple Footbridge from near Temple Lock
- Coordinates: 51°33′07″N 0°47′49″W
- Carries: Thames Path
- Crosses: River Thames
- Locale: Hurley, Berkshire

Characteristics
- Material: Wood
- Total length: 88 yards (80 m)
- Height: 21 feet 3 inches (6.48 m)
- No. of spans: 1

History
- Opened: 1989

Location
- Interactive map of Temple Footbridge

Temple Footbridge is a pedestrian only bridge near Hurley, Berkshire across the River Thames in England. It connects the Buckinghamshire and Berkshire banks. It crosses the Thames just above Temple Lock.

The bridge was built in 1989 specifically for walkers on the Thames Path. Previously walkers on the Thames Path had been required to take a detour away from the river bank along a road through Bisham and Marlow. The bridge was opened by Lord Hesketh on 24 May 1989, following a campaign by Margaret Bowdery, a local advocate of access to open spaces and improvements to footpaths. As part of the campaign for the construction of the bridge she ran a "Golden Boot" appeal and raised over £2000 towards its construction. Formerly there was a ferry at this point which took the towpath across the river when it was used for towing barges. The ferry ceased operation in 1953.

The name "Temple" comes from Temple Mill Island which was owned by the Knights Templar and the site of a mill, which was used to create copper sheets used in the construction of ships for the Royal Navy. The mill had a large water wheel to drive the milling machinery.

It is a haunched girder bridge with a wooden deck. At 150 feet (46 m), it is the longest hardwood bridge in Britain. The centre of the bridge gives a height of 6.51 metres (21.4 ft) above the water allowing the passage of a range of vessels.

In May 2019 the bridge was declared unsafe and closed to pedestrians. It was repaired and reopened in June of the same year.

On 15 May 2023, the bridge was closed due to some of the deck boards degrading faster than expected. In September 2023, the Environment Agency reported that immediate repairs are not possible and the bridge will remain closed for an extended time. Between November 2025 and February 2026 large sections of the bridge were removed and inspected, including the central section and the side spans, which were deemed to have deteriorated beyond the point of economical repair. It was announced in December of 2025 that the bridge would remain closed for months.

== See also ==
- Crossings of the River Thames

Next bridge upstream	River Thames	Next bridge downstream
Hambledon Lock (pedestrian)	Temple Footbridge; Grid reference SU718740	Marlow Bridge (road)
Next bridge upstream	Thames Path	Next bridge downstream
southern bank Henley Bridge	Temple Footbridge; Grid reference SU718740	northern bank Bourne End Railway Bridge
