= Marlow Lock =

Lock and weir on the River Thames in Buckinghamshire, England

Coordinates: 51.5673°N 0.768812°W

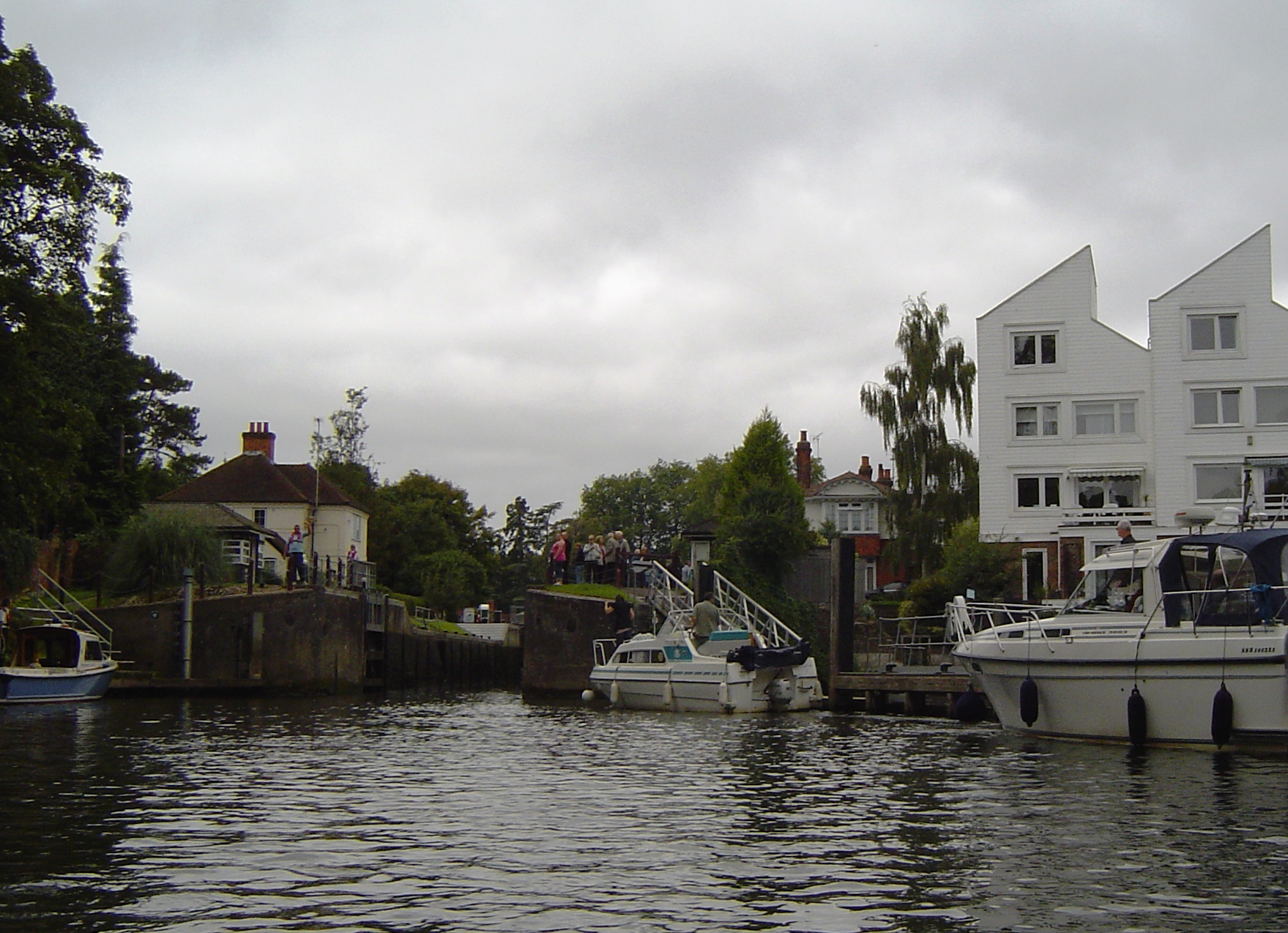
- Marlow Lock from downstream
- Waterway: River Thames
- County: Buckinghamshire
- Maintained by: Environment Agency
- Operation: Hydraulic
- First built: 1773
- Latest built: 1927
- Length: 46.10 m (151 ft 3 in)
- Width: 6.07 m (19 ft 11 in)
- Fall: 2.16 m (7 ft 1 in)
- Above sea level: 88'
- Distance to Teddington Lock: 37 miles

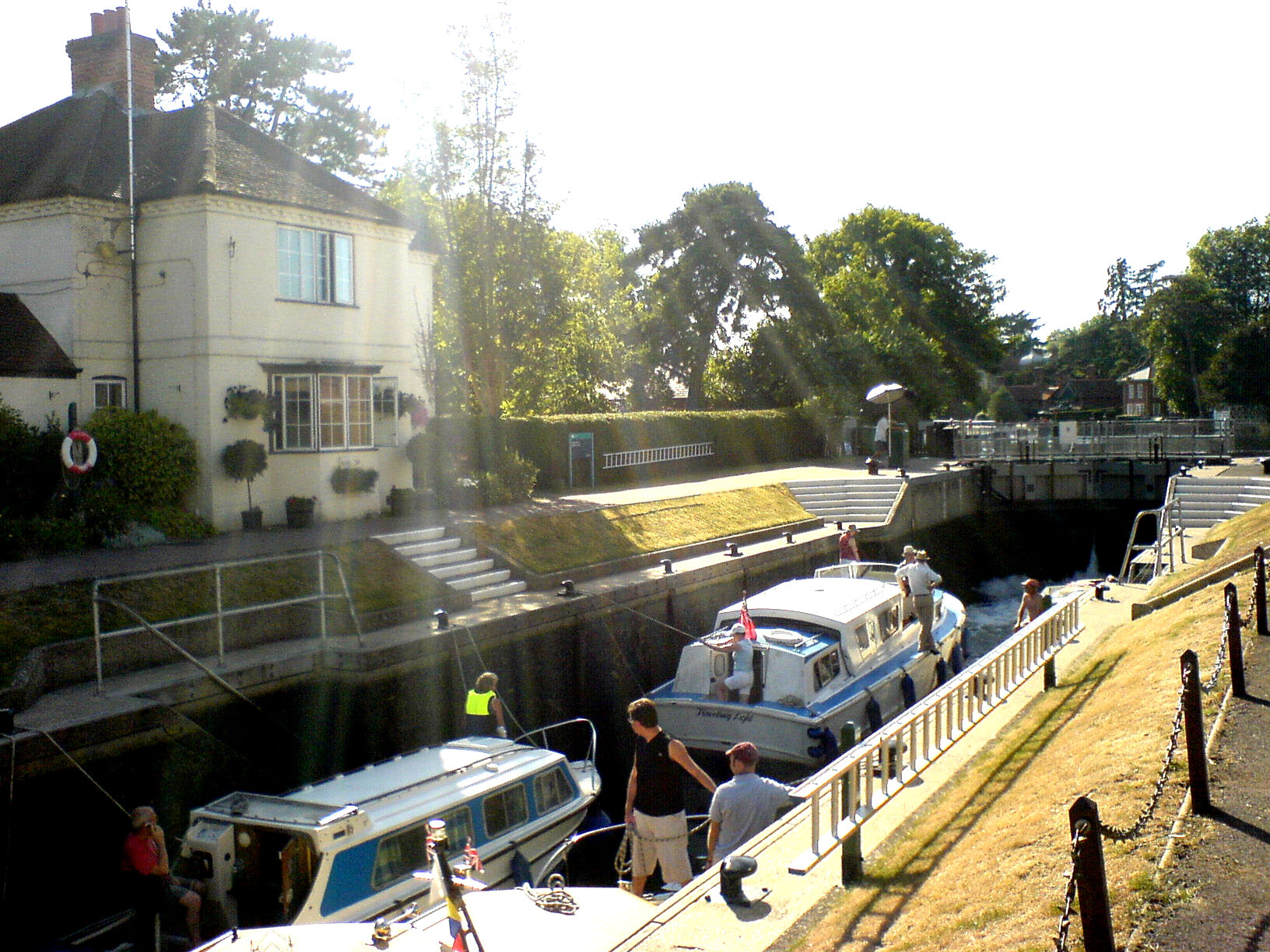
Marlow Lock

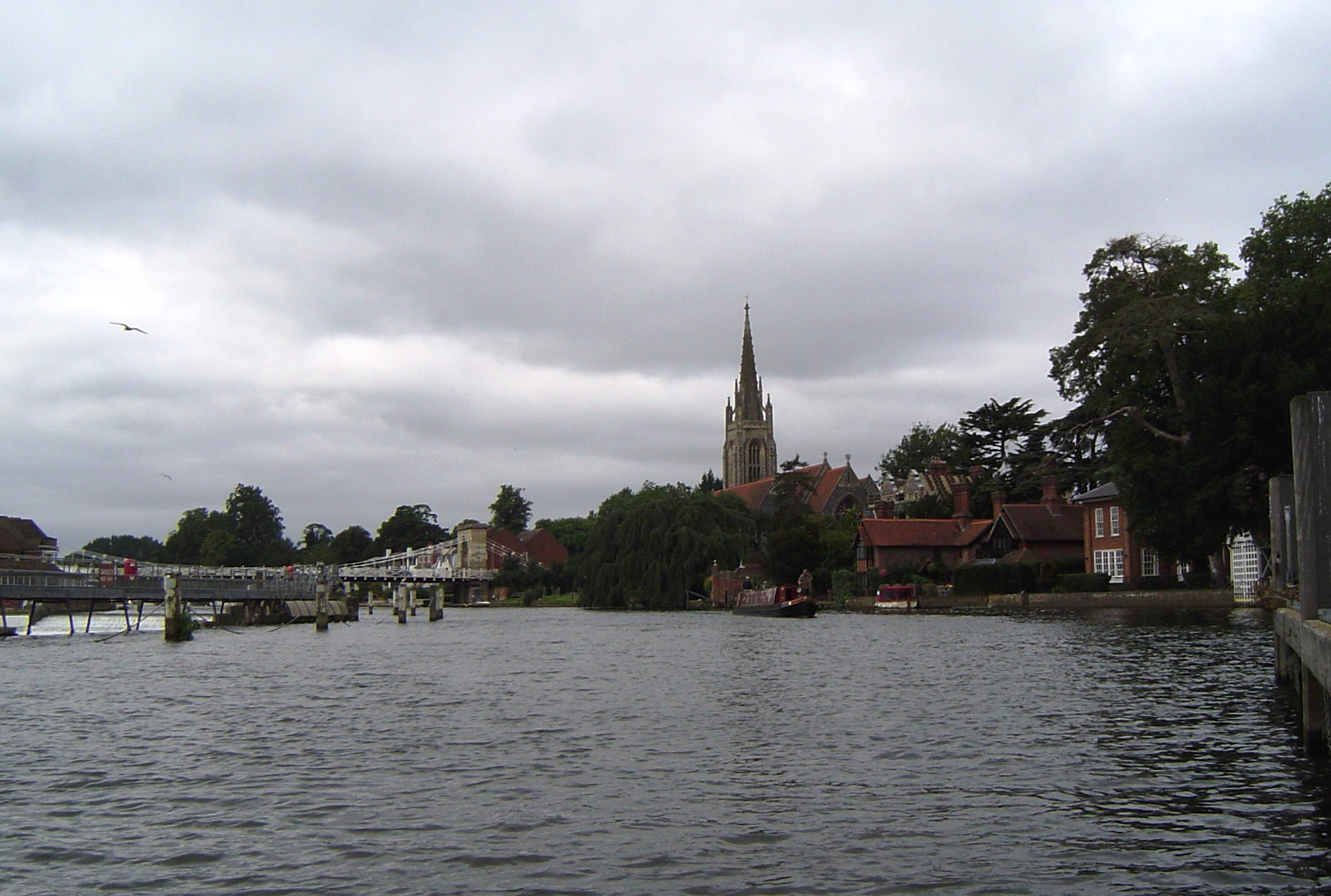
Marlow weir on the left upstream of the lock

Marlow Lock is a lock and weir situated on the River Thames in the town of Marlow, Buckinghamshire, England, about 300m downstream of Marlow Bridge. The first pound lock was built by the Thames Navigation Commission in 1773.

The weir stretches a long way upstream above the lock.

== History ==
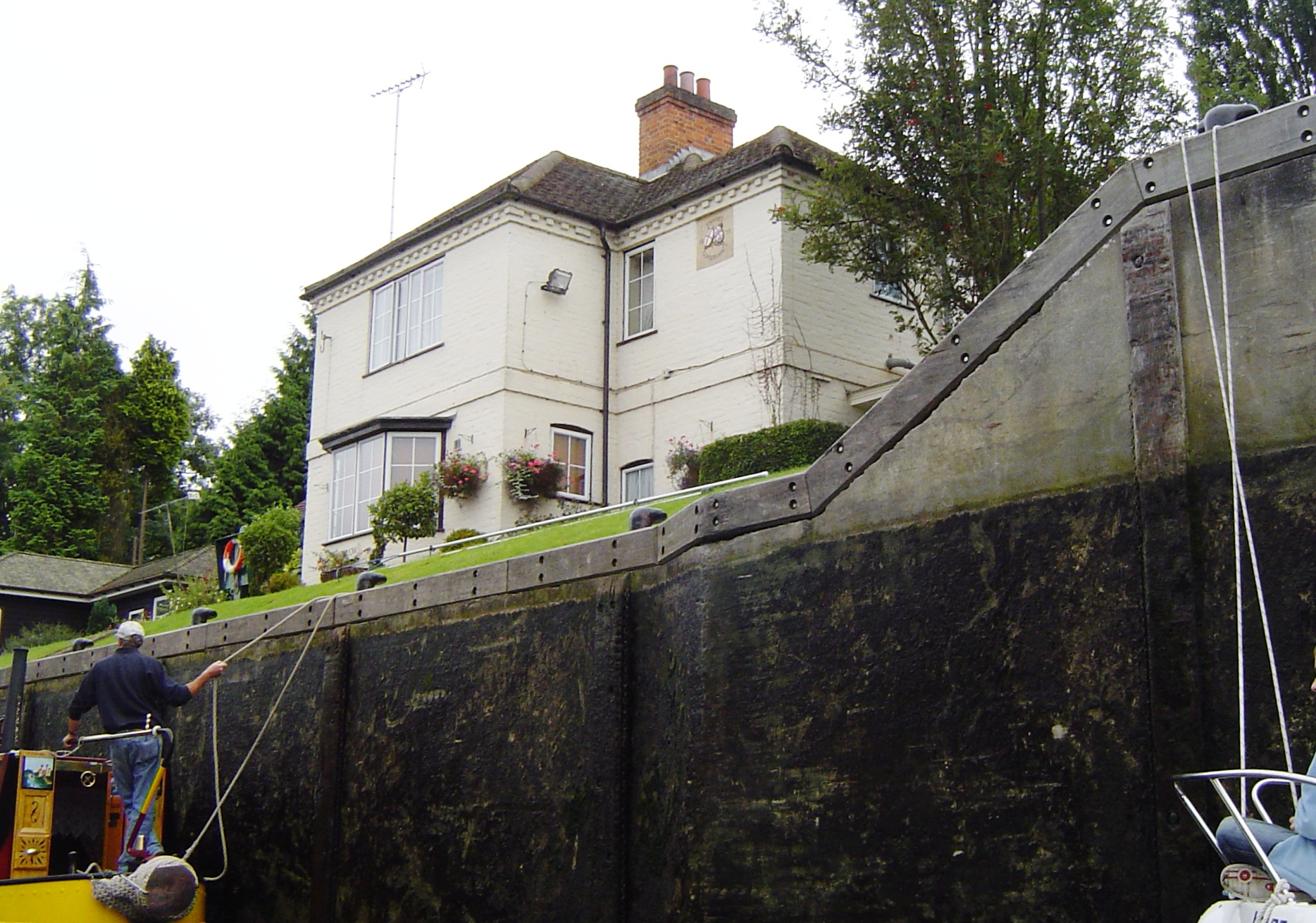
Marlow lock house, viewed from inside the chamber before being filled to travel upstream

A weir at Marlow is recorded in Domesday Book, and there are 14th century records of a winch to pull traffic through a flash lock. The lock was very problematical and in the 16th and 17th century there are accounts of conflicts between millers and navigators. A particular problem was the shallow draught. The first pound lock was built of fir in 1773, the seventh downstream of the eight built after the 1770 navigation act. It was upstream of the present lock and still proved problematical. Rollers were needed to guide barges in, and as there was no towpath, barges needed tow ropes several hundred feet long. The lock needed extensive repairs in 1780 and a year later eel bucks had to be removed from the flash lock in case it was needed. The first lock house was erected in 1815 and in 1825 the lock was reconstructed on its present site of Headington stone. The weir was rebuilt in 1872. The last rebuilding of the lock occurred in 1927.

== Access to the lock ==
The lock is easily accessible, being located on the town side, accessed via a short footpath off Mill Lane. In Marlow town the Thames Path passes through town back streets including Mill Lane, so the short diversion is required to visit the lock.

== Reach above the lock ==
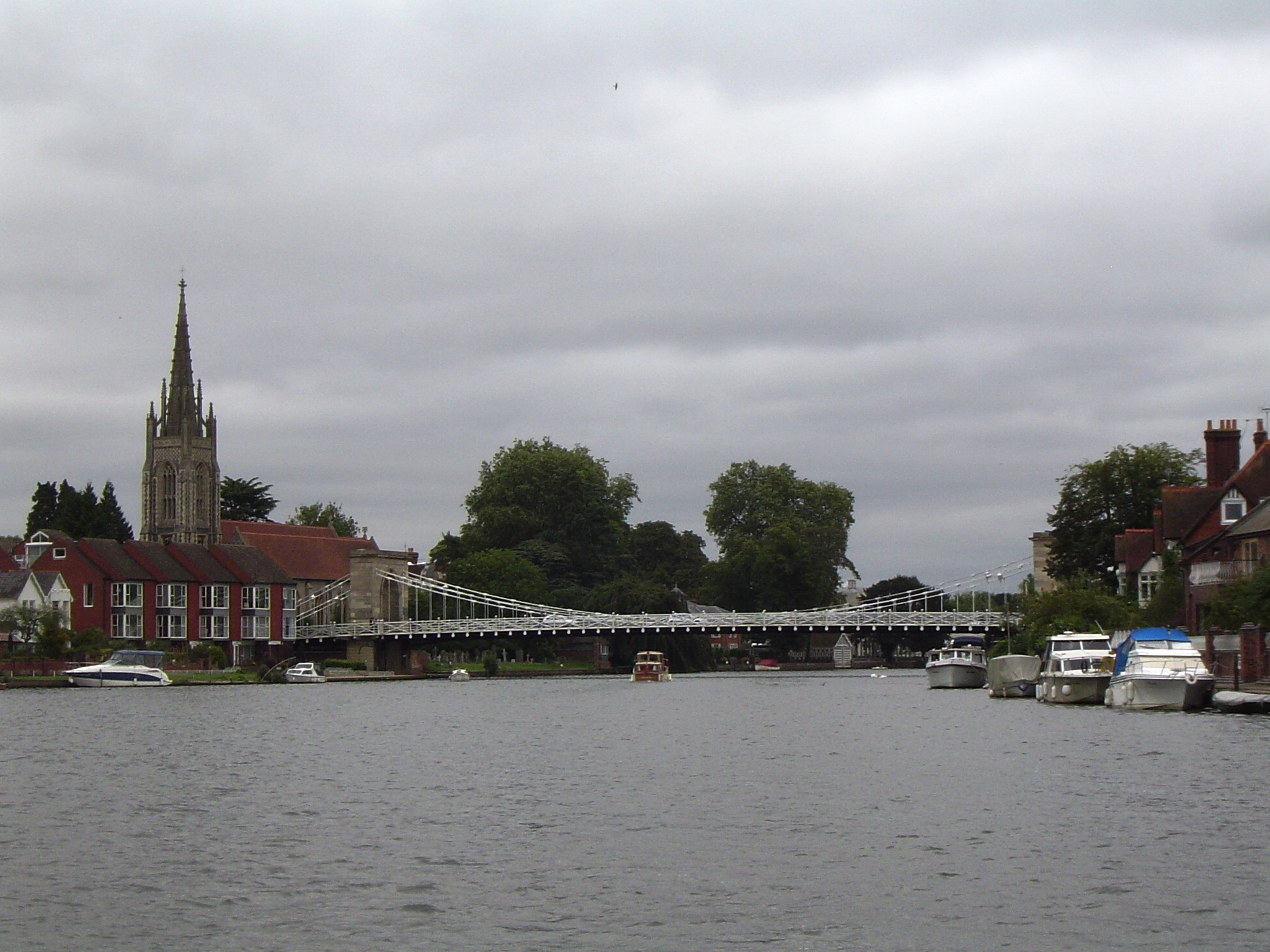
Marlow from the river

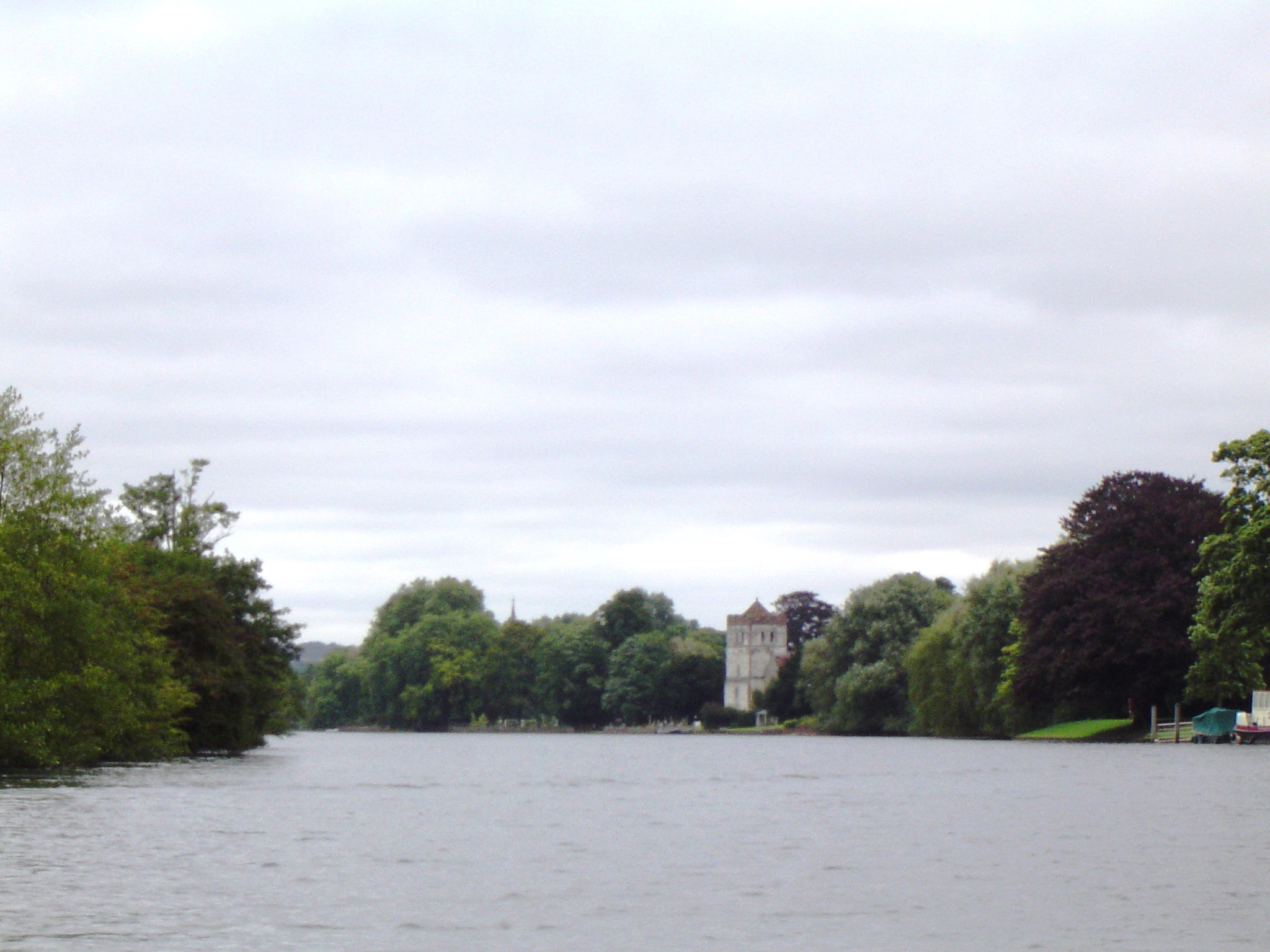
Bisham looking downstream

The long weir stretches several hundred yards above the lock, and beyond it is Marlow suspension bridge close to the church. Once the river leaves the Marlow, it curls through hills and beechwoods. On the Berkshire side is Bisham Abbey, a fine old mansion associated with Anne of Cleves and Queen Elizabeth that is now one of the National Sports Centres. Further upstream is the church of Bisham itself.

Temple Mill Island is just downstream of Temple Lock.

Temple Regatta takes place in early May between Marlow Bridge and Temple Lock, and Marlow Town Regatta is held in June.

=== Sports clubs ===
- Marlow Rowing Club

=== Thames Path ===
After diverting from the river about 200m downstream of the lock, the Thames Path runs through town back streets, passing just north of the lock in Mill Lane. The path rejoins the river at Marlow Bridge. It does not cross the bridge, but passes through Higginson Park and continues on the Bucks side to Temple Lock.

== Literature and the media ==
The poet Percy Bysshe Shelley lived in Marlow and spent much of his time on the river above the lock in a skiff. It was during this time that he composed The Revolt of Islam.

The lock was used in 1970 to film the scene in The Ambassadors of Death episode of Doctor Who, when Liz Shaw is chased onto the weir.

== See also ==
- Locks on the River Thames
- Rowing on the River Thames

Next lock upstream	River Thames	Next lock downstream
Temple Lock; 2.7 km (1.7 mi)	Marlow Lock; Grid reference: SU851861	Cookham Lock; 6.44 km (4.00 mi)
