= Hambleden Lock =

Lock on the River Thames in Berkshire, England

Coordinates: 51.56027°N 0.87333°W

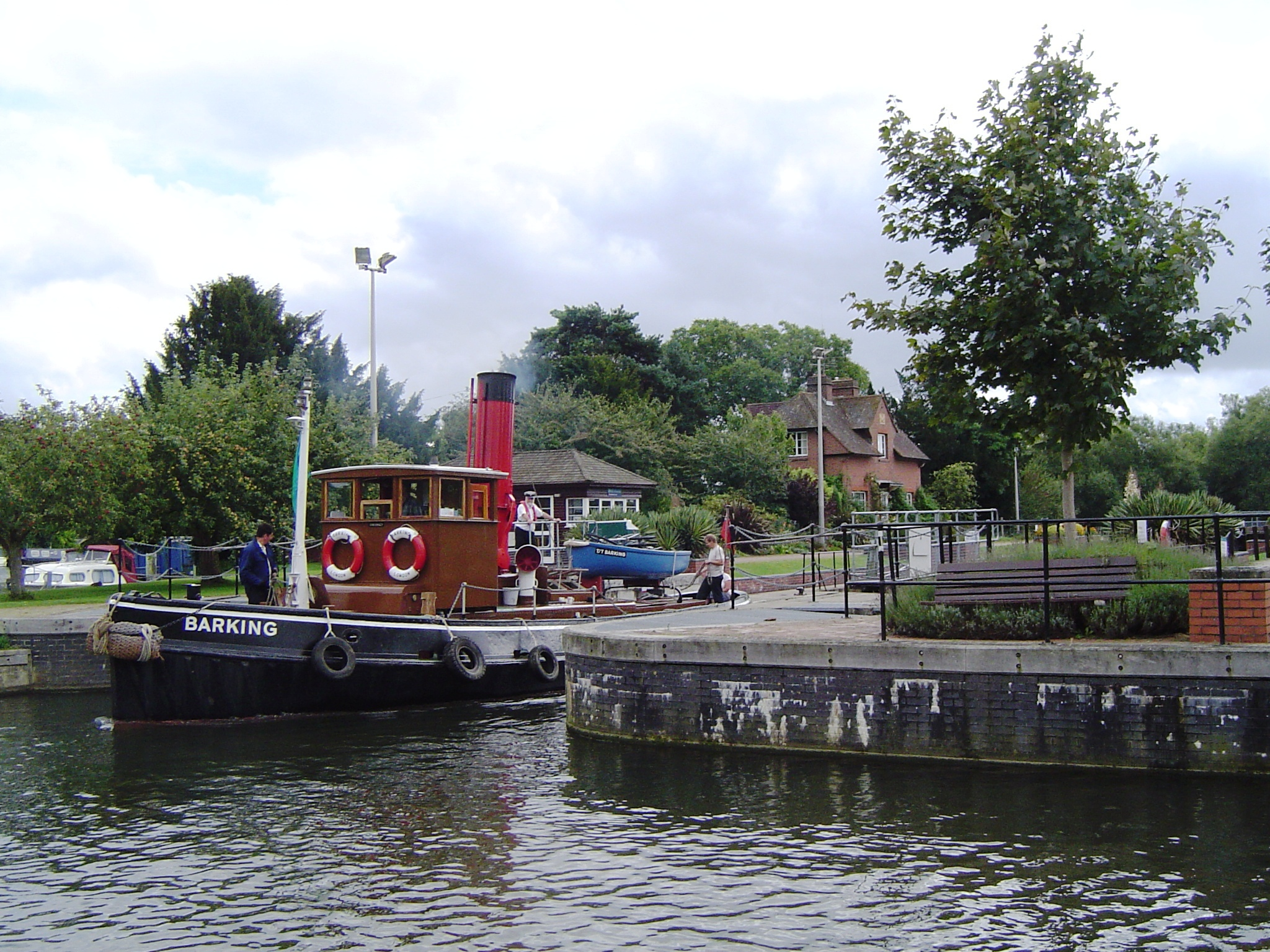
- An old tug boat leaves the lock
- Interactive map of Hambleden Lock
- Waterway: River Thames
- County: Berkshire
- Maintained by: Environment Agency
- Operation: Hydraulic
- First built: 1773
- Latest built: 1994
- Length: 61.00 m (200 ft 2 in)
- Width: 7.70 m (25 ft 3 in)
- Fall: 1.44 m (4 ft 9 in)
- Above sea level: 101'
- Distance to Teddington Lock: 43 miles
- Power is available out of hours

Hambleden Lock is a lock with a long weir situated on the River Thames in England, about 2 miles downstream of Henley Bridge. The lock is the civil parish of Remenham on the Berkshire bank, between the settlements of Aston and Remenham. Built by the Thames Navigation Commission in 1773, the lock is named after the village of Hambleden, a mile (1.5 km) to the north.

The great weir is impressive and there are walkways over it from the lock to the small village of Mill End on the Buckinghamshire bank. Here is situated the picturesque Hambleden Mill, and the site of a Roman villa is nearby.

== History ==
The mill at Hambleden is mentioned in Domesday Book, which implies there was also a weir here then. There is reference to the weir, with a winch (for pulling boats through the flash lock) in 1338. The pound lock was the fourth downstream in the series of locks built after the 1770 navigation act. The others were built of fir which had to be replaced by oak after a dozen years. In 1777 a small brick house was built and Caleb Gould became keeper. This eccentric, who baked bread for bargemen, ate a dish of onion porridge every night, wore a long coat with many buttons and walked daily to Hambleden marking a cross on the ground where he reached, was in post at the lock for 59 years and was succeeded by his son.

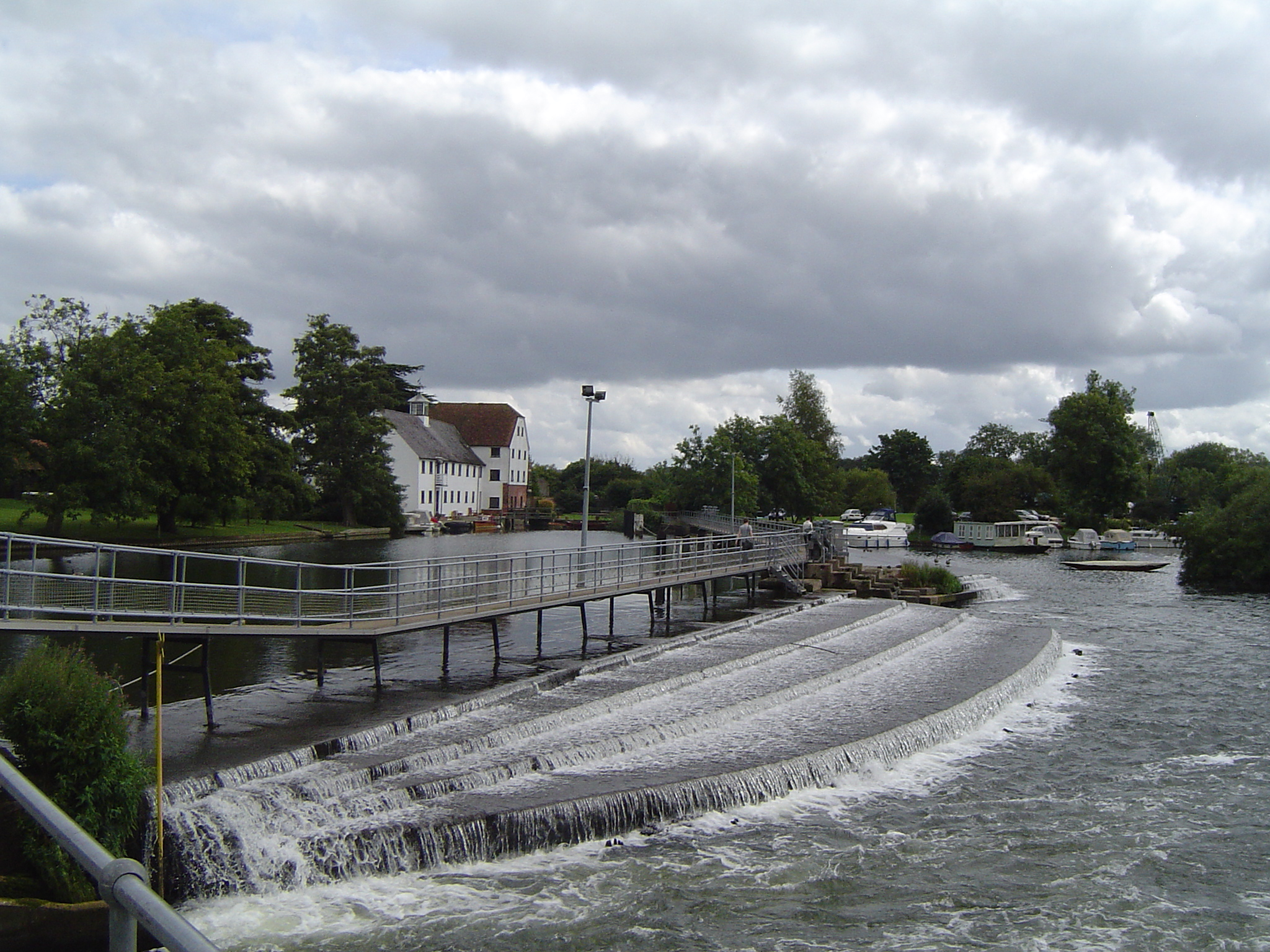
Weir, mill and walkway at Hambleden

There is reference to continuing use of the flash lock and winch at the weir until the middle of the nineteenth century. The channel downstream of the lock which takes navigation clear of the weir and weir pool was excavated in 1825.

In June 1829, the lock was the starting point for the first boat race between Oxford and Cambridge universities. The course ended 2.25-mile (3.62 km) upstream at Henley Bridge. An estimated 20,000 spectators watched Oxford win the race.

The lock was completely rebuilt in 1870 after years of complaint about its condition. In 1884 the new weirs were built and after public complaints the walkway was built to reopen the ancient right of way. The lock was rebuilt in 1994.

== Access to the lock ==
The lock can be reached from the village of Aston on the same side, after a short walk; access to the track leading to the lock is immediately to the west of the Flower Pot pub. From the opposite side the walkways across the weirs provide easy access from Mill End.

== Reach above the lock ==
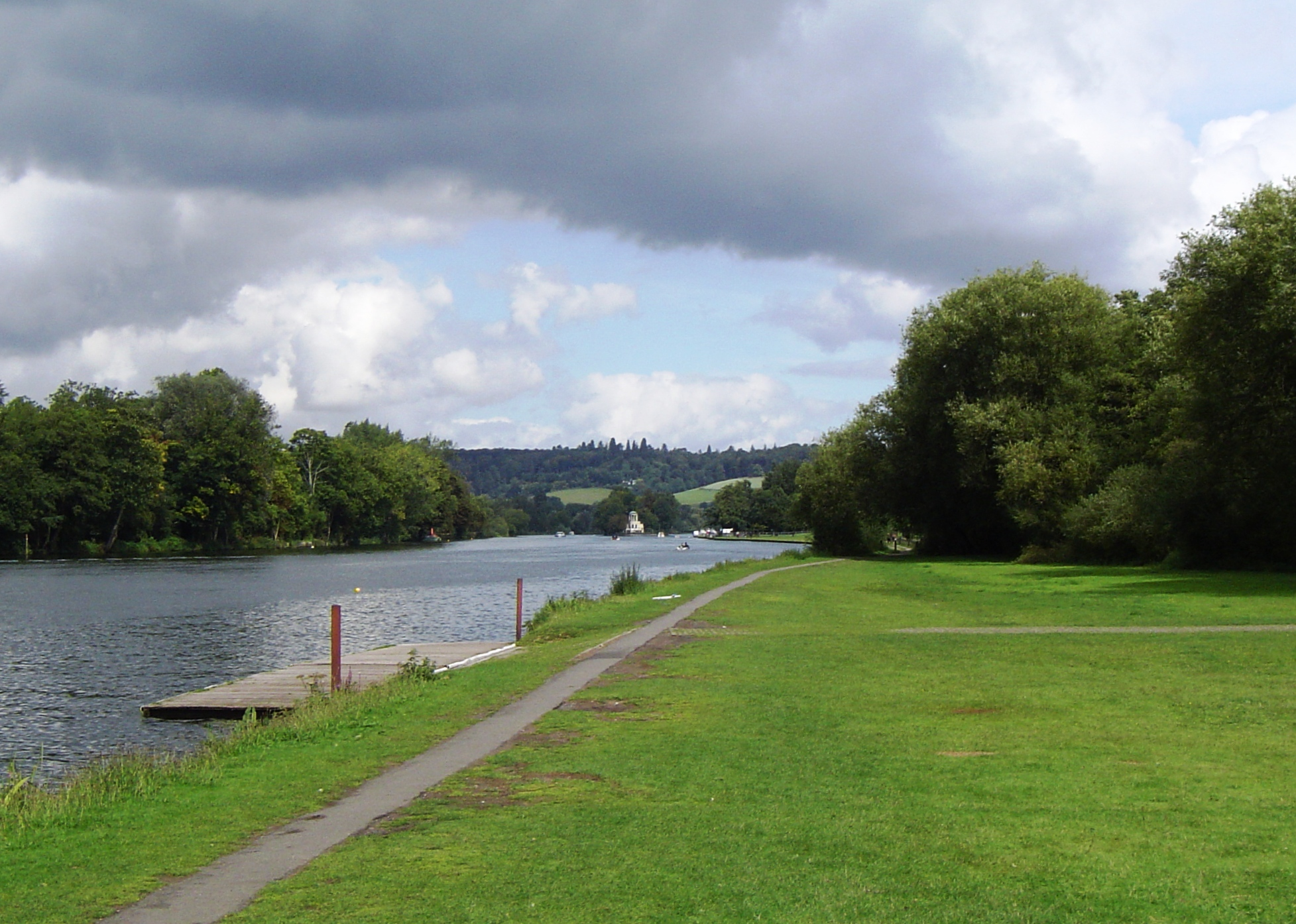
View downstream towards Temple Island

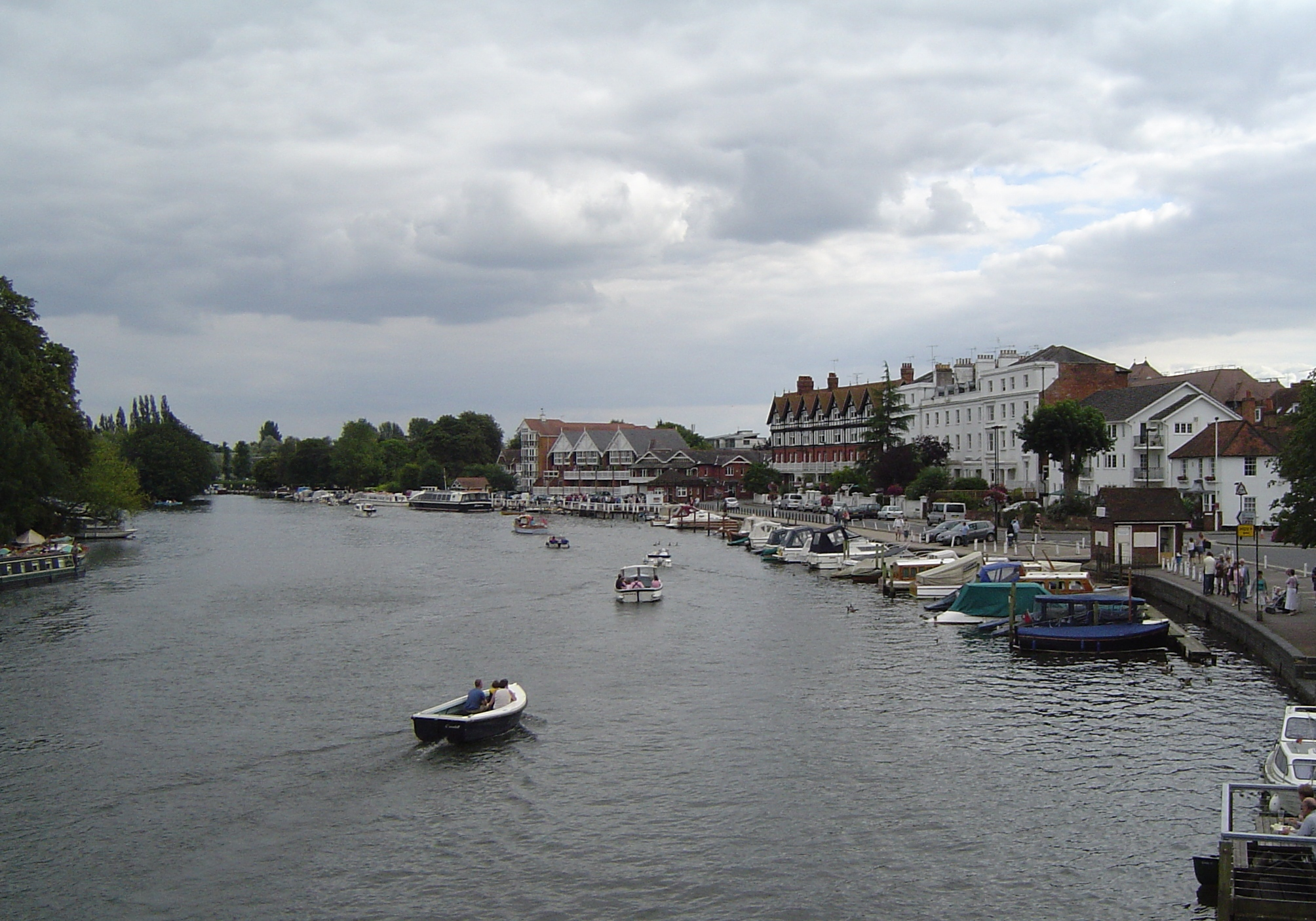
Looking upstream from Henley Bridge

The river curves round to the south, passing, on the Buckinghamshire bank, Greenlands, a large country house built in the nineteenth century which is now the home of the Henley Management College. After the turn is Temple Island, which is the start of the Henley Royal Regatta course. The regatta is rowed upstream over a wide straight course of 1 mile, 550 yards (2,112 m). On the Berkshire bank are open fields, lawns and Remenham Farm, part of the village of Remenham. The regatta lawns continue up to Henley Bridge, while the town of Henley on Thames stretches along the Oxfordshire bank.

The annual Henley Festival is also held on the reach, stretching between just upstream of Hambleden village and just short of the next lock upstream from Hambleden, Marsh Lock.

After Henley Bridge is the Henley river front with boat hire and a landing stage for riverboat cruises. After a small wooded island is the larger Rod Eyot, and Mill Meadows provides public open space on the Henley side of the river. The River and Rowing Museum is situated here. On the Berkshire bank the land rises steeply with a wooded escarpment hanging over Marsh Lock.

=== Sports clubs on the reach ===
- Upper Thames Rowing Club
- Remenham Club
- Leander Club
- Henley Rowing Club

=== Thames Path ===
The Thames Path stays on the Berkshire bank to Henley Bridge, and is here in better condition for the benefit of the rowing coaches who cycle along it. It crosses Henley Bridge and continues on the Oxfordshire bank to Marsh Lock.

== Kayak and canoe use ==
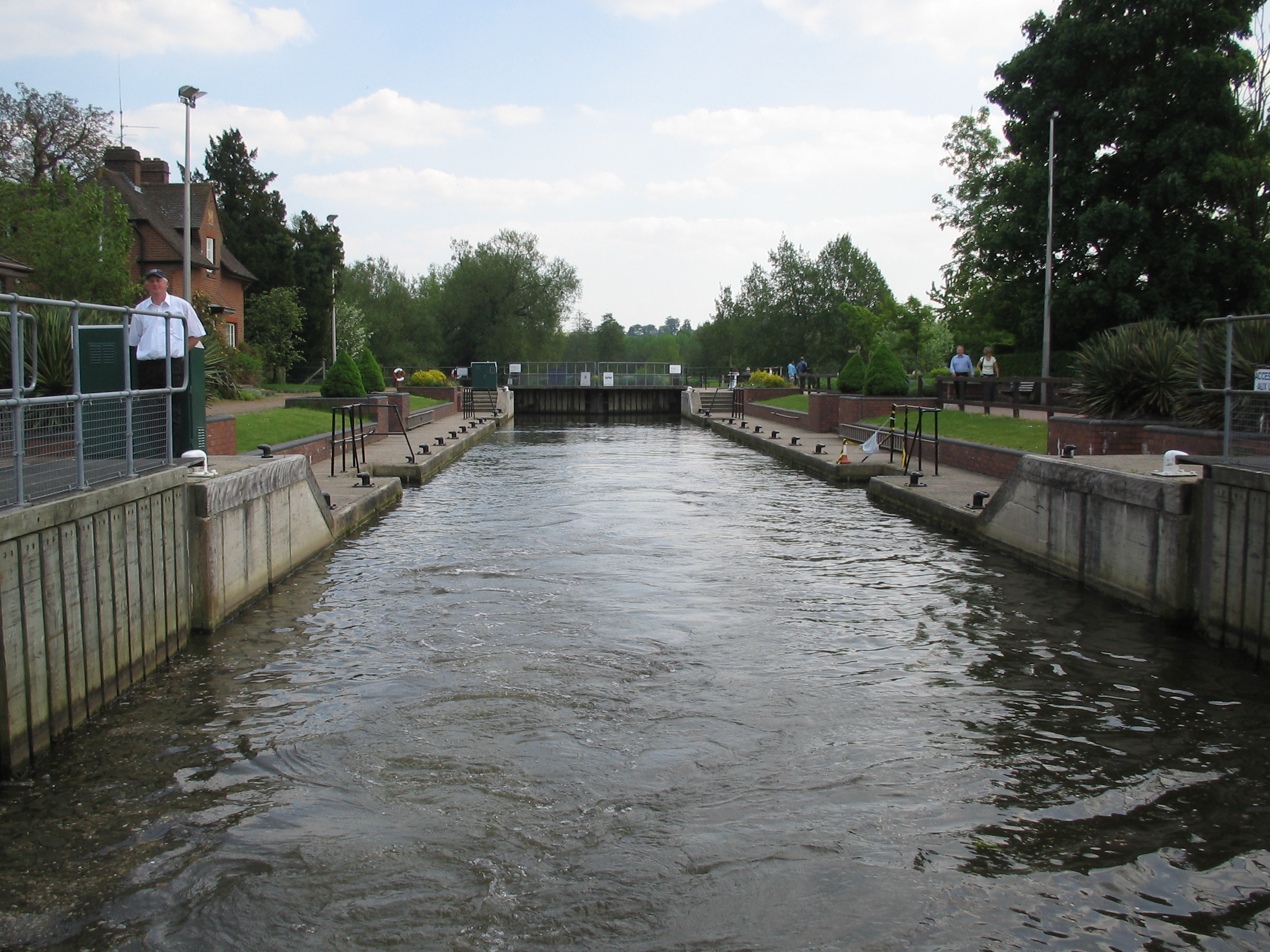

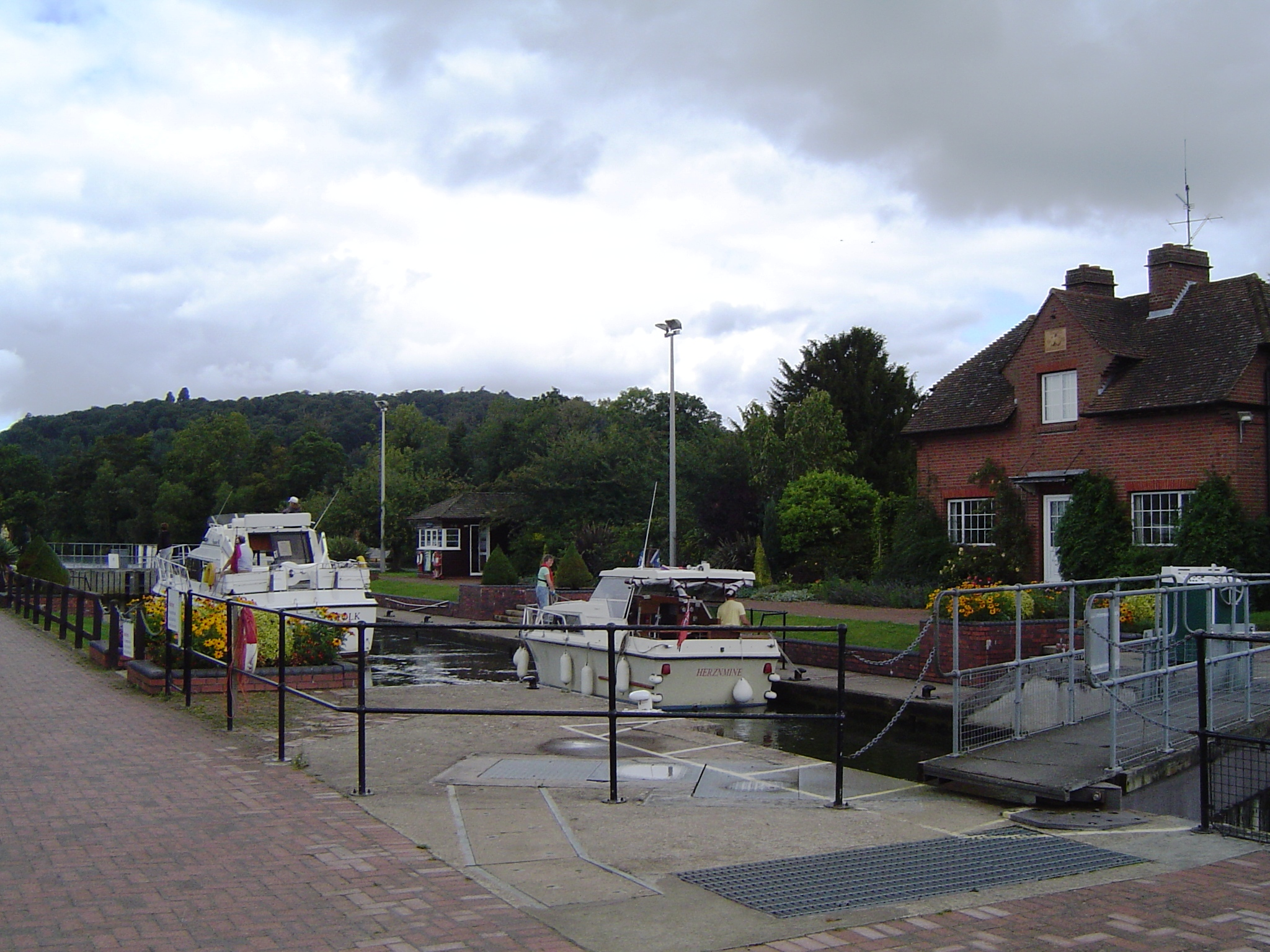
Looking upstream from the lock

Since the 1940s kayakers and canoeists have used the weir structure for recreation.

In each of the four sluices a concrete ramp of about 16 deg has been fixed to the weir apron, on top of these a hinged steel plate is fixed. The hinged steel plate is adjustable between the 16 deg of the base concrete ramp and approx 28 deg. The adjustment of the steel plate is currently by pneumatic bellows installed between the plate and the concrete base.

== Literature and the media ==
In Jerome K. Jerome's 1889 humorous novel, Three Men in a Boat. The narrator and his two friends ask the lock-keeper at Hambleden Lock for some drinking water to replenish their boat's supply, and are nonplussed when he suggests they drink water from the river, as he habitually did.

In the book, Jerome also mentions the nearby Greenlands, describing it as "the rather uninteresting river residence of my newsagent - a quiet unassuming old gentleman, who may be met with about these regions, during the summer months, sculling himself along in easy vigorous style, or chatting genially to some old lock-keeper, as he passes through". The newsagent in question was W H Smith.

Caleb Gould's gravestone at Remenham has the elegy

This world’s a jest,
And all things show it;
I thought so once,
And now I know it.

== See also ==
- Locks on the River Thames
- Crossings of the River Thames
- Rowing on the River Thames
- Kayaking and Canoeing on the River Thames

Next lock upstream	River Thames	Next lock downstream
Marsh Lock; 4.59 km (2.85 mi)	Hambleden Lock; Grid reference SU782852	Hurley Lock; 5.89 km (3.66 mi)
Next crossing upstream	River Thames	Next crossing downstream
Henley Bridge	Hambleden Lock	Temple Footbridge
