= The Boat Race 1829 =

1st Boat Race
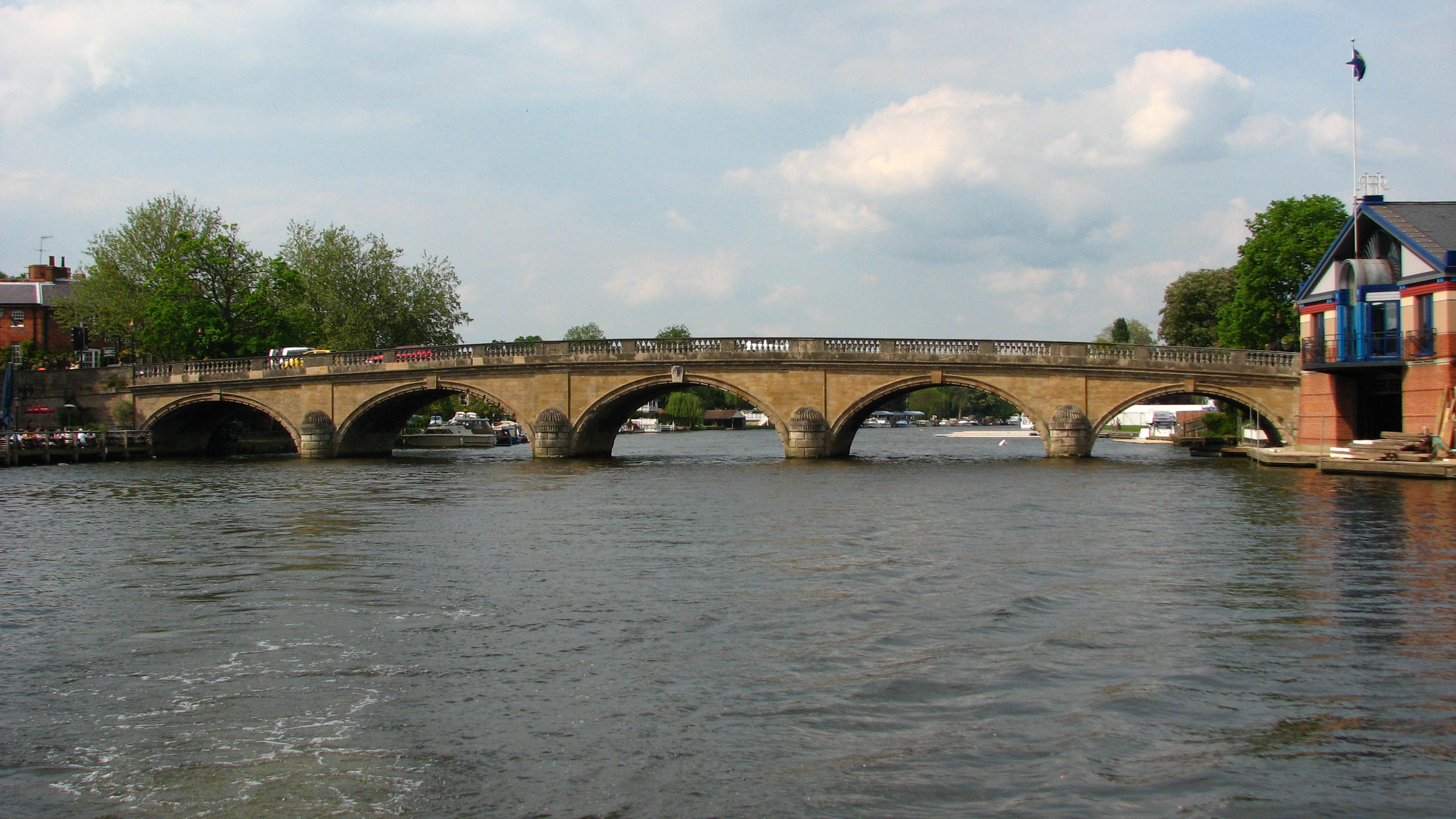
- Henley Bridge, the finish of the 1st Boat Race
- Date: 10 June 1829
- Winner: Oxford
- Margin of victory: "easily"
- Winning time: 14 minutes 30 seconds
- Overall record (Cambridge–Oxford): 0–1
- Umpire: Cyril Page (Oxford); John Stuart Roupell (Cambridge)

The 1st Boat Race took place at Henley-on-Thames on 10 June 1829. The race came about following a challenge laid down to the University of Oxford by University of Cambridge "to row a match at or near London, each in an eight-oared boat during the ensuing Easter vacation". Oxford wore dark blue jerseys while Cambridge wore "white with pink waistbands". In front of a crowd estimated to be around 20,000, and according to the official record, Oxford won the race "easily" in a time of 14 minutes 30 seconds. The Boat Race became an annual fixture, and as of 2022, has been contested 167 times.

== Background ==
Eight rowing had been popular at the University of Oxford for a number of years before a club was established at the University of Cambridge around 1827. At a meeting of the Cambridge University Boat Club in February 1829, it was decided to challenge Oxford "to row a match at or near London, each in an eight-oared boat during the ensuing Easter vacation". The race was deferred to the summer, as rowing did not start at Oxford until after Easter, and scheduled for 10 June 1829 for a prize of 500 guineas. During the pre-race betting, Cambridge were the favourites to win the race.

Oxford wore a dark blue check outfit for the race, while Cambridge wore white with pink waistbands. The two boats were said to be "very handsome, and wrought in a superior style of workmanship" by The Morning Post; Oxford's green boat was built by Stephen Davies and Isaac King of Oxford, and was slightly the shorter, measuring 44 feet (13 m). Cambridge's pink boat was 18 inches (0.46 m) longer, and built by Searle of Westminster. The umpires for the race were Mr Cyril Page (for Oxford) and Mr John Stuart Roupell (for Cambridge). Should the umpires disagree about any aspect of the race, they had recourse to consult the referee, whose name was not recorded.

== Crews ==
The Cambridge crew weighed an average of 11 st 1.75 lb (70.5 kg); as the records for the Oxford crew are incomplete, no average weight can be calculated.

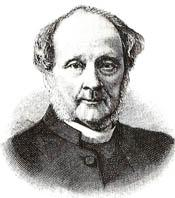
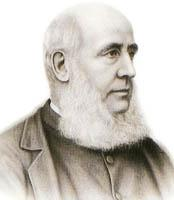
Oxford's Charles Wordsworth (left) and Cambridge's Charles Merivale (right) both rowed at number four for their respective university.

| Seat | Cambridge | | | Oxford | | |
| Seat | Name | College | Weight | Name | College | Weight |
|---|---|---|---|---|---|---|
| Bow | A. B. E. Holdsworth | 1st Trinity | 10 st 7 lb | J. Carter | St John's | |
| 2 | A. F. Bayford | Trinity Hall | 10 st 8 | E. J. Arbuthnot | Balliol | |
| 3 | C. Warren | 2nd Trinity | 10 st 10 | J. E. Bates | Christ Church | |
| 4 | C. Merivale | Lady Margaret | 11 st 0 lb | C. Wordsworth | Christ Church | 11 st 10 lb |
| 5 | Thos. Entwistle | Trinity Hall | 11 st 4 lb | J. J. Toogood | Balliol | 14 st 10 lb |
| 6 | W. T. Thompson | Jesus | 11 st 10 lb | T. F. Garnier | Worcester | |
| 7 | G. A. Selwyn | Lady Margaret | 11 st 13 lb | G. B. Moore | Christ Church | 12 st 4 lb |
| Stroke | W. Snow (P) | Lady Margaret | 11 st 4 lb | T. Staniforth (C) | Christ Church | 12 st 0 lb |
| Cox | B. R. Heath | 1st Trinity | 9 st 4.75 lb | W. R. Fremantle | Christ Church | 8 st 2 lb |
Source: (P) – boat club president (C) – crew captain

== Race ==
The course of the inaugural Boat Race started at Hambleden Lock and ended at Henley Bridge.

The course for the race was a 2.25-mile (3.62 km) stretch of the River Thames between Hambleden Lock and Henley Bridge. Cambridge won the toss and elected to start on the Berkshire side of the river, handing the Buckinghamshire side to Oxford. According to the author William Fisher MacMichael, "it was as fine a day as our climate allows a June day to be." The race had originally been scheduled to start at 6:00 p.m. but this was altered to 7:00 p.m. and was further delayed. Upon the start of the race, by which time around 20,000 people were reckoned to be in attendance to watch, the Oxford boat was steered close to the Cambridge boat, forcing it to row close to the shore. This drew complaints from the Cambridge crew, who insisted that the race be restarted. The Oxford crew relented, and the race began for the second time at 7:55 p.m. In the early stages of the race, the two crews were evenly matched, but after they passed an island in the river, Oxford drew ahead.

Once they had passed the island, and were in the main flow of the river, the Oxford crew demonstrated their strength. The Morning Post report of the race records that both crews "put out the strength of their arms in excellent style", and although the Cambridge boat maintained a higher stroke rate, Oxford maintained their lead throughout the rest of the race. Their margin of victory is variously reported as being between two and four lengths (although is recorded officially as "easily"), in a time reported variously between 14 minutes and 14 minutes 30 seconds.

== Legacy ==
The event, subsequently referred to as The Boat Race, or the University Boat Race, was held for a second time seven years later, in 1836 on the River Thames. It was then held intermittently until the 1856 race, after which it became an annual event, interrupted only by the First, and Second World Wars and the COVID-19 pandemic. As of 2021, 166 Boat Races have been contested; Cambridge lead overall with 85 victories to Oxford's 80, excluding the one "dead heat" recorded in the 1877 race.
