= Locks and weirs on the River Thames =

Aquatic infrastructure on the English River Thames

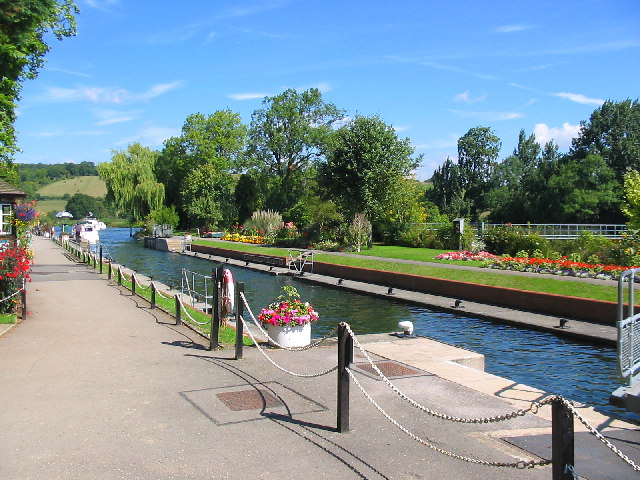
Mapledurham Lock

The English River Thames is navigable from Cricklade (for very small, shallow boats) or Lechlade (for larger boats) to the sea, and this part of the river falls 71 meters (234 feet). There are 45 locks on the river, each with one or more adjacent weirs. These lock and weir combinations are used for controlling the flow of water down the river, most notably when there is a risk of flooding, and provide for navigation above the tideway.

== History ==
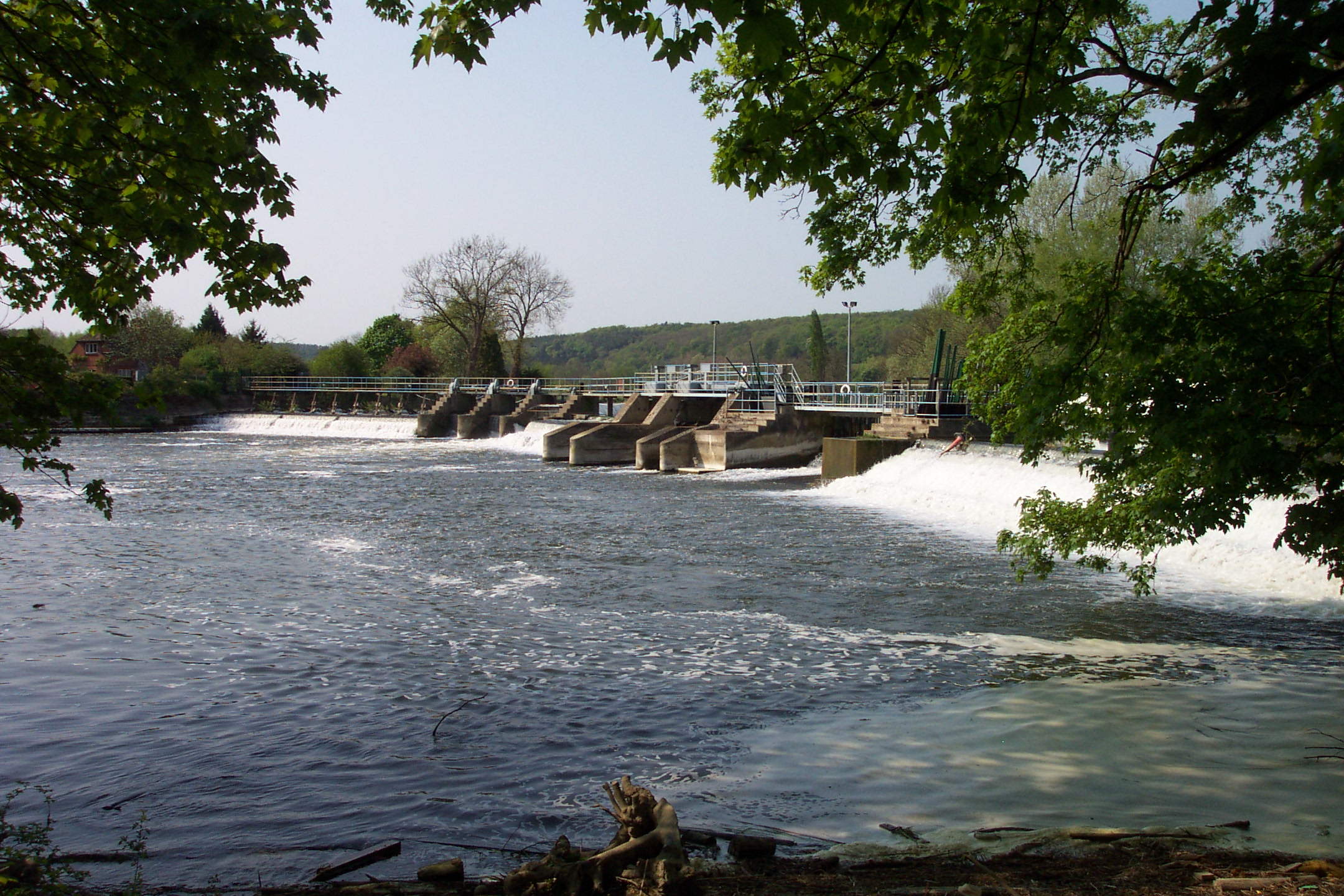
The weir at Mapledurham Lock

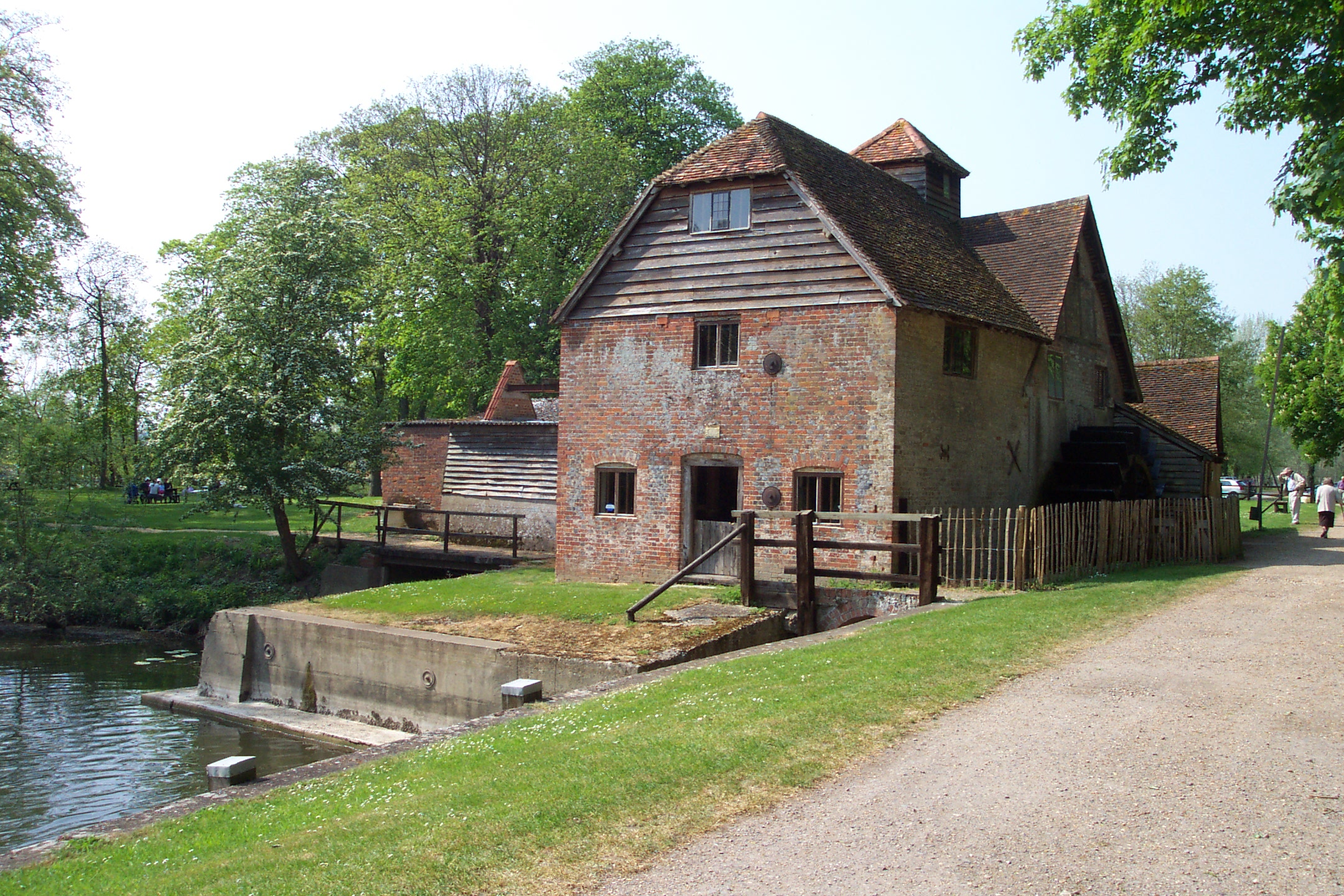
Mapledurham Watermill

From ancient times there were many obstructions across the Thames, for fish-pounds and millers' weirs. They are referred to by Asserius Menevensis in the ninth century and Magna Carta (1215) states that "weirs, for the time to come, shall be demolished in the Thames and Medway, except on the sea coast." It appears this never happened. In the Middle Ages, the fall on the river in its middle and upper sections was used to drive watermills for the production of flour and paper and various other purposes such as metal-beating. This involved the construction of weirs in order to divert water into the mills. The weirs, however, presented an obstacle to navigation and to solve this problem locks were built alongside the weirs to enable boats to be moved between levels.

Originally these were flash locks that were essentially removable sections of weir. A boat moving downstream would wait above the lock until the lock was opened, which would allow a "flash" of water to pass through, carrying the boat with it. In the opposite direction boats would be winched or towed through the open lock. The difficulty of using flash locks, and the consequent loss of water and income to the miller, eventually led to their replacement with pound locks. Locks similar to these early pound locks still exist on the river, although in many cases they have been enlarged and mechanised.

On the lower section, the river was tidal as far as Staines until the beginning of the 19th century and was under the control of the City of London. The City's jurisdiction was marked by the London Stone. The principle of lock/weir combination, which maintained the depth of water for navigation and reduced the danger of flooding, was extended over the tidal section as far as Teddington in a series of locks built after 1810.

The first authority charged with managing navigation and lock building was the Oxford-Burcot Commission, which built the locks at Iffley and Sandford below Oxford in 1633 and at Swift Ditch near Abingdon. In 1751, the Thames Navigation Commissioners were established and built eight locks between Shiplake Lock and Boulters lock between 1770 and 1773. The opening of the Thames and Severn Canal from Lechlade in 1789 led to the building of many of the locks upstream of Shiplake. The six locks built by the City of London Corporation on the tidal section below Staines between 1811 and 1815 required individual Acts of Parliament, and the Thames Conservancy took over their management from the City in 1857. In 1866 the Thames Conservancy became responsible for all river management and installed more locks over the years, the last being Eynsham and King’s in 1928. In 1908 an Act transferred responsibility for the Thames from a point 350 yards (320 m) below Teddington Lock to the Port of London Authority, and this included Richmond Lock. The Thames Conservancy was subsumed into the Thames Water Authority in 1974. With the privatization of water supply in 1990 the river management functions passed to the new National Rivers Authority and in 1996 to the Environment Agency. Only Richmond Lock remains under the jurisdiction of the Port of London Authority.

== Operation ==
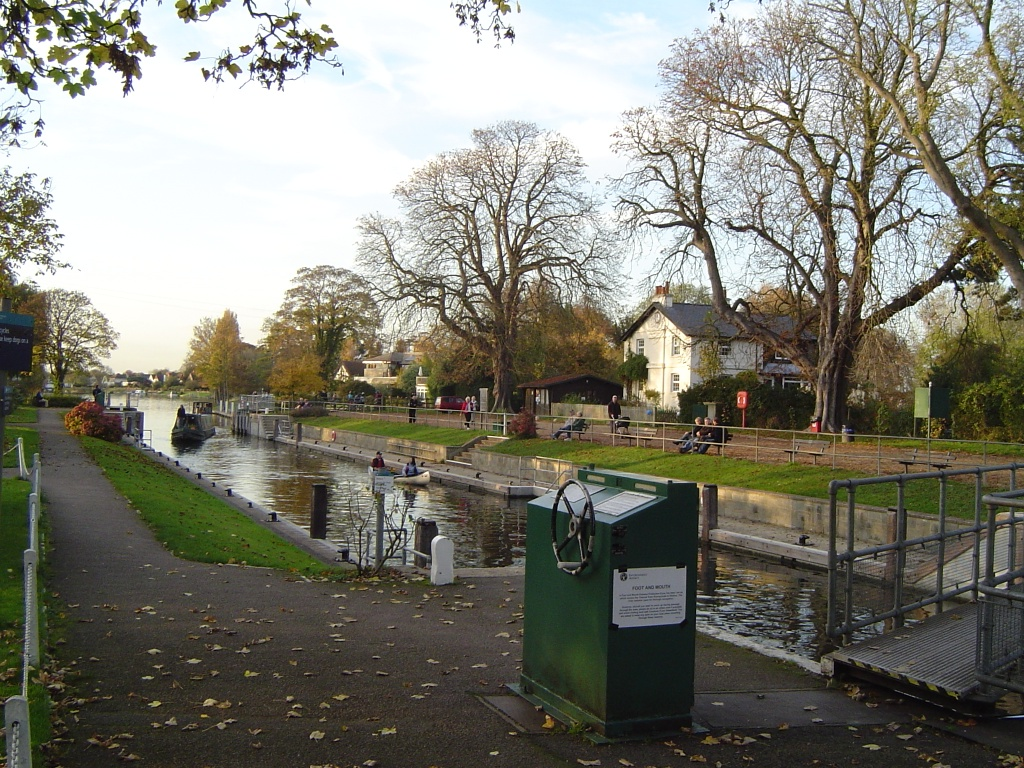
Penton Hook Lock with City of London arms on the House. The green box is the hydraulic control system

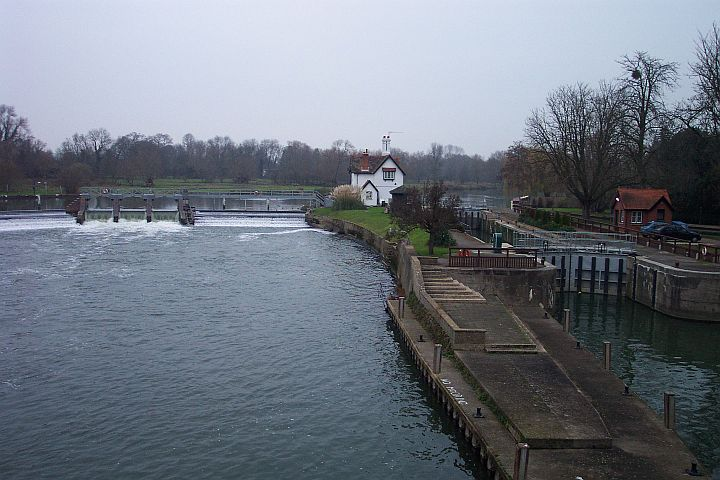
Goring Lock demonstrates the common juxtaposition of weir, lock island, lock keeper's house and lock

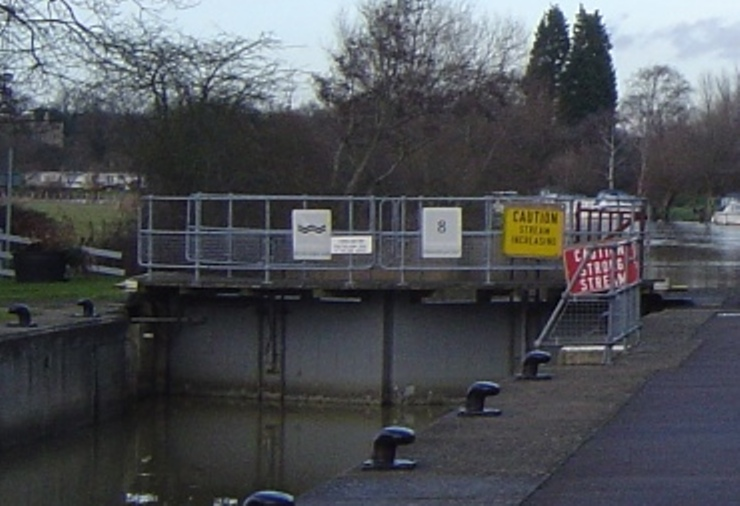
Choice of Yellow and Red warning boards which are placed on lock gates when navigation is hazardous

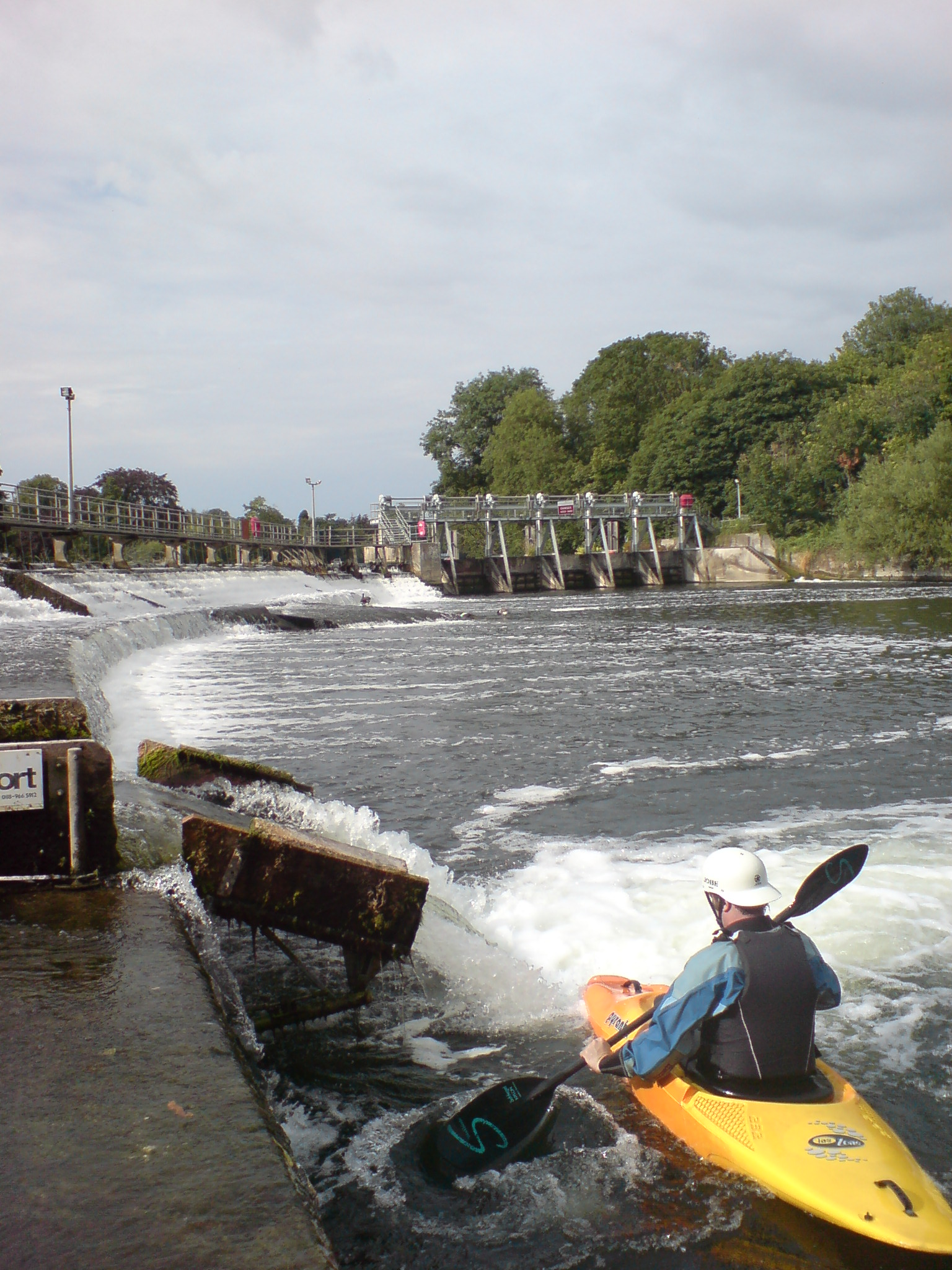
Kayaker at Boulter's Weir

=== Management ===
From the head of navigation at Cricklade to the start of the tidal section at Teddington Lock, the river is managed by the Environment Agency, which has the twin responsibilities of managing the flow of water to control flooding and provide navigable water depths and also regulating and promoting navigation on the river. As a result, all the locks and weirs on the river, except the semi-tidal Richmond Lock, are owned and operated by the Environment Agency. Richmond Lock is managed by the Port of London Authority.

Most of the Environment Agency's locks and weirs are staffed by a lock keeper, who often lives in a house adjacent to the lock. The lock keeper's duties involve both operating the lock, and managing the river levels above the lock by adjusting the weir openings.

=== Locks ===
Most locks are operated by their keepers between 9 a.m. and 7 p.m. from June to August, with progressively shorter hours as the hours of daylight reduce, and they are not operated during the lock-keeper's lunch hour between 1 p.m. and 2 p.m. During the summer months Assistant Lock Keepers and volunteers are employed to deal with the heavy traffic and avoid the lunch-time closure. However Teddington Lock, which is the most downstream of the Environment Agency locks and separates the long Kingston reach of the non-tidal river from Hampton Court to the tideway, is staffed 24 hours a day. During winter, some locks will be closed for maintenance and the status has to be checked with the Environment Agency.

The locks at the upper end of the river, from St John's Lock to King's Lock, are manually operated. All other locks on the Thames are hydraulically operated. All locks, except Teddington, can be operated by boat crews outside manning hours, using the adapted system of "public power", which allows boaters to use the hydraulic machinery at reduced power, except during the hours of darkness.

Locks are popular visitor attractions, and many serve refreshments. Locks were often built adjacent to islands and therefore many are situated in remote locations, hard to find and can only be reached on foot. Many locks also have moorings that can be used overnight, and some include electric charging points for electric powered boats.

All the locks have obvious access from the Thames Path, except for Whitchurch Lock which is within an island and only accessible by boat; Cookham Lock requires a 1km diversion from the Thames Path; and Marlow Lock requires a short diversion.

=== Weirs ===
The Environment Agency has the responsibility of managing the flow of water along the length of the river to prevent flooding on particular reaches and to maintain navigation depths. The volume and speed of water down the river is managed by adjusting the gates at each weir. Occasionally this can result in a fast stream rendering navigation more hazardous. These conditions are indicated by yellow or red warning boards on the lock gates and the status of all locks is published by the Agency. The Agency cannot legally stop navigation when the red boards are out, but continuing to travel is inadvisable and may invalidate a boater's insurance.

Occasionally flooding is unavoidable, and the Agency issues Flood Warnings with three levels of severity - Flood Alert, Flood Warning, and Severe Flood Warning.

In recent years the Salmon Conservancy has been installing fish ladders at weirs to allow salmon to travel up river.

Today some weirs are often used recreationally by kayakers and canoeists for activities such as whitewater slalom and playboating. Specifically, Hambleden Weir and Boulter's Weir have EA sanctioned modifications made to them for such use.

=== Reaches ===
The locks and weirs, in effect, break the river up into 44 lakes or lock reaches. Each lock controls the reach above it and thus identifies it. Each reach has its own character and points of interest.

Many reaches host regattas and other events and these are coordinated through a River User’s Group for the reach. The Environment Agency may close all or part of a reach for an event, but most regattas only require one side of the river which may then be closed off.

When the boats were horse drawn, a towpath was needed on the bank side. This towpath has formed the basis for the Thames Path which runs between the source and mouth of the river. The path runs between locks and is therefore often the main means of access on land. Where the towpath changes from one side of the river to the other ferries were once provided. These have now almost all disappeared and the Thames Path has to be diverted to the nearest bridge, often a considerable distance, to cope with this.

=== Foot crossings ===
All of the Thames locks have walkways on top of the lock gates, so except at Whitchurch Lock one can cross to the lock island from the adjacent bank. Upstream of Wallingford, many locks also have walkways on top of the weir to cross the whole river. Downstream of Wallingford, Caversham Lock and Boulters Lock have footbridges nearby, and Hambleden Lock has a walkway on top of the weir, but the other locks below Wallingford do not allow river crossing on foot.

== List of locks and weirs ==
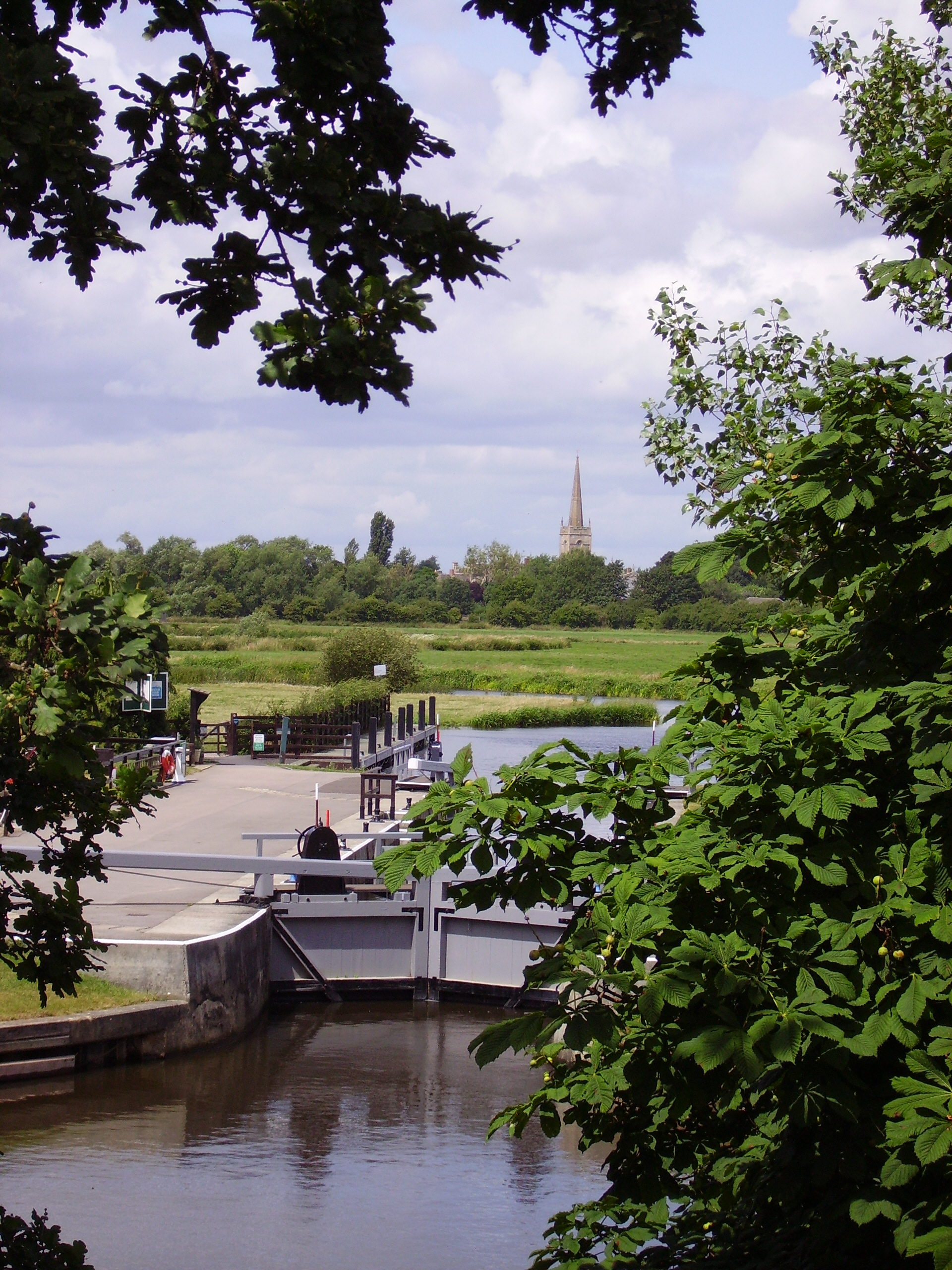
St John's lock - the beams indicate manual operation

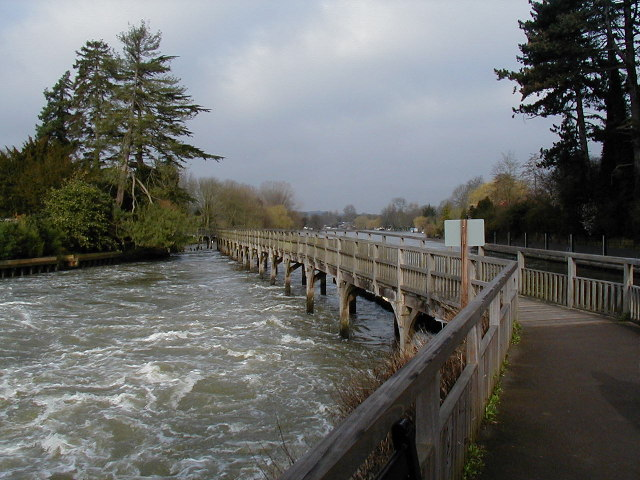
The footbridge at Marsh Lock

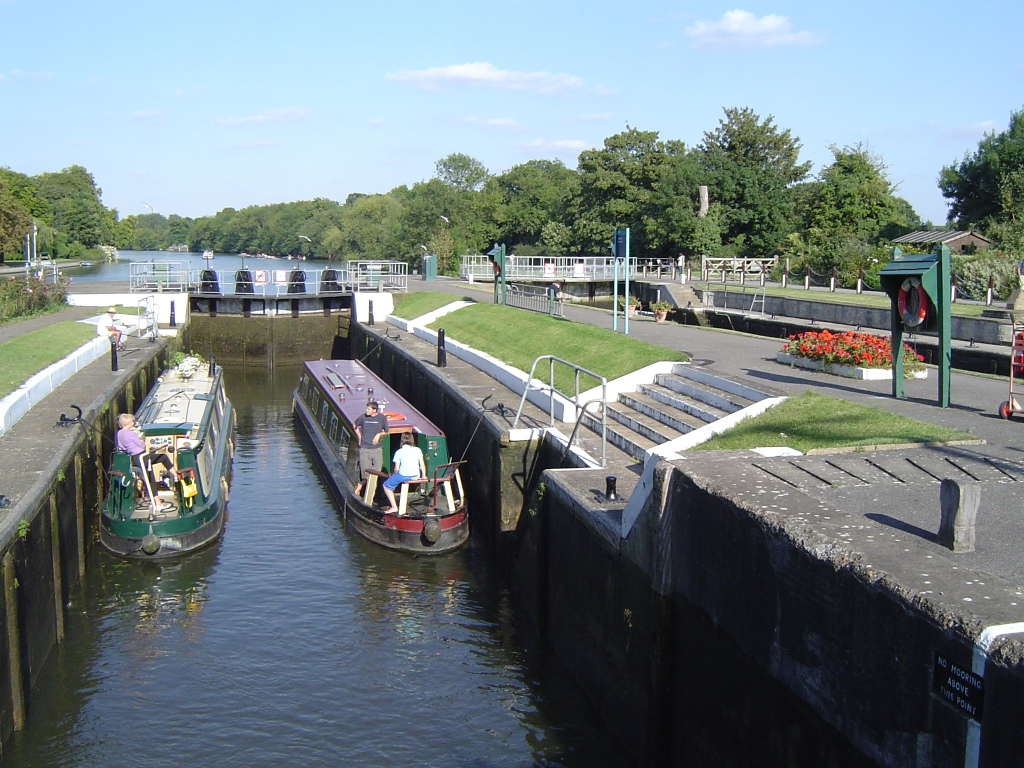
Paired locks at Sunbury

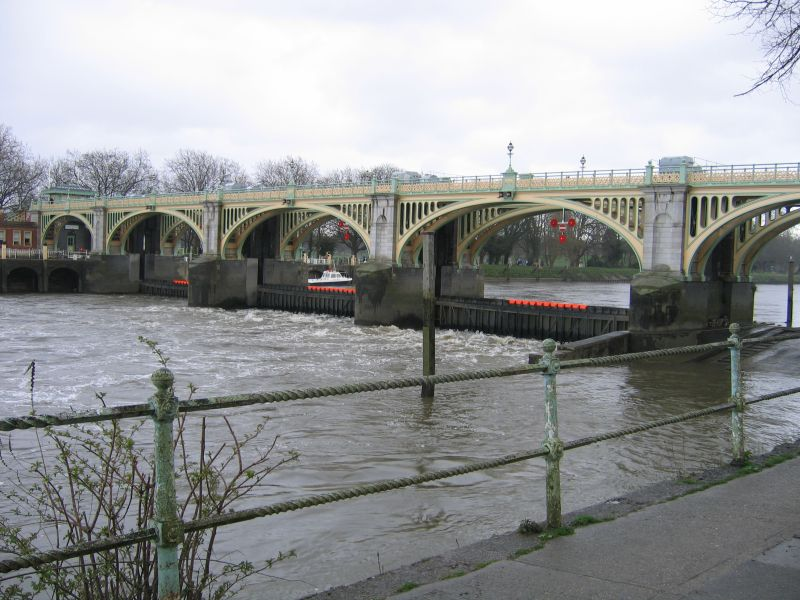
Richmond half tide barrage, Lock by far bank

The list of locks, weirs and ferries is given in upstream to downstream order, from source to sea. Most of the older flash locks have disappeared and there are only three ferries still operating (Weybridge, Hampton and Hammerton's). Nearly all of the older weirs and most of the current ones once had associated mills, fifteen of which are mentioned in the Domesday Book, but very few of these survive. A few weirs had bucks for catching eels.

On the non-tidal Thames, the Environment Agency Waterways team sub-divide the river into patches each with a Team Leader, Technical Officer and Lock & Weir Keepers.

EA Patch	Lock	Date	Recorded date of flash lock	Fall	Distance from next lock up	Earlier weirs in this reach	Ferries
A	St John's Lock	1790	1775	0.85 m (2.8 ft)			
A	Buscot Lock	1790		1.69 m (5.5 ft)	1.85 km (1.15 mi)		
A	Grafton Lock	1896	1762 (Day's/Lower Hart)	1.11 m (3.6 ft)	5.37 km (3.34 mi)	Farmer's, Harts	
A	Radcot Lock	1892	1746 (Beck's, Clare's or Buck's)	1.48 m (4.9 ft)	2.98 km (1.85 mi)	Old Eye	
A	Rushey Lock	1790		1.82 m (6.0 ft)	4.23 km (2.63 mi)	Old Nan's	Rushey
A	Shifford Lock	1898	1762	2.23 m (7.3 ft)	6.92 km (4.30 mi)	Tadpole (Kent), Thames, Ten foot, Shifford Upper, Duxford	Duxford
A	Northmoor Lock	1896	(Hart's Weir)	1.24 m (4.1 ft)	7.63 km (4.74 mi)	Limbre's	Ridge's (Hart's)
A	Pinkhill Lock	1791	Pre-1791	1.05 m (3.4 ft)	6.21 km (3.86 mi)	Ridge's (Langley), Ark, Skinner's	Bablock Hythe
B	Eynsham Lock		1791	0.84 m (2.8 ft)	2.38 km (1.48 mi)		
B	King's Lock	1890?	1541	0.77 m (2.5 ft)	4.37 km (2.72 mi)	Clay	
B	Godstow Lock	1790		1.57 m (5.2 ft)	1.81 km (1.12 mi)		
B	Osney Lock	1790	1227	1.89 m (6.2 ft)	3.87 km (2.40 mi)	Medley (Binsey)	
B	Iffley Lock	by 1632	1585	0.81 m (2.7 ft)	3.73 km (2.32 mi)	Folly	Iffley
B	Sandford Lock	1632 (enlarged 1793)		2.69 m (8.8 ft)	2.7 km (1.7 mi)		
B	Abingdon Lock	1790	1316	1.89 m (6.2 ft)	7.38 km (4.59 mi)	Nuneham	Thrupp
C	Culham Lock	1638 (moved 1809)	1580	2.41 m (7.9 ft)	4.15 km (2.58 mi)	Culham old (1638 on Swift ditch), Swift	
C	Clifton Lock	1812		1.03 m (3.4 ft)	4.52 km (2.81 mi)		Culham
C	Day's Lock	1789	1580	1.58 m (5.2 ft)	4.8 km (3.0 mi)		Dorchester, Clifton
C	Benson Lock	1788	1746	1.87 m (6.1 ft)	6.37 km (3.96 mi)		Shillingford, Keen Edge
C	Cleeve Lock	1787	1580	0.89 m (2.9 ft)	10.46 km (6.50 mi)	Pollington's, Chalmore Lock, Moulsford (lock)	Leather Bottle, South Stoke, Littlestoke, Chalmore, Benson
C	Goring Lock	1787	1538	1.77 m (5.8 ft)	1 km (0.62 mi)		Streatley
C	Whitchurch Lock	1787	1580	1.01 m (3.3 ft)	6.55 km (4.07 mi)	Hart's lock	Gatehampton
D	Mapledurham Lock	1777	1300	2.05 m (6.7 ft)	3.67 km (2.28 mi)		
D	Caversham Lock	1778	1493	1.44 m (4.7 ft)	7.08 km (4.40 mi)	Chawsey	Purley (2)
D	Sonning Lock	1773	1580	1.63 m (5.3 ft)	4.23 km (2.63 mi)	Breach's	
D	Shiplake Lock	1773	1746	1.55 m (5.1 ft)	4.68 km (2.91 mi)		Wargrave, Bolney
D	Marsh Lock	1773	1580	1.33 m (4.4 ft)	4.8 km (3.0 mi)		Beggar's Hole (Bolney), Lashbrook, Wargrave
E	Hambleden Lock	1773	1338	1.44 m (4.7 ft)	4.59 km (2.85 mi)		Aston
E	Hurley Lock	1773	1580	1.05 m (3.4 ft)	5.89 km (3.66 mi)	Mednam	Medmenham
E	Temple Lock	1773	1580	1.23 m (4.0 ft)	1.03 km (0.64 mi)		Temple
E	Marlow Lock	1773	1585	2.16 m (7.1 ft)	3.13 km (1.94 mi)		
E	Cookham Lock	1830		1.3 m (4.3 ft)	6.44 km (4.00 mi)		Cookham Upper, Spade Oak
E	Boulter's Lock	1772 (moved 1828)	1580	2.39 m (7.8 ft)	3.35 km (2.08 mi)		My Lady, Hedsor
E	Bray Lock	1845	1328	1.46 m (4.8 ft)	3.43 km (2.13 mi)		
F	Boveney Lock	1838	1375	1.47 m (4.8 ft)	5.1 km (3.2 mi)		Boveney
F	Romney Lock	1797		2.01 m (6.6 ft)	3.75 km (2.33 mi)	Gill's bucks	Windsor
F	Old Windsor Lock	1822	1300	1.74 m (5.7 ft)	4.83 km (3.00 mi)		Datchet
F	Bell Weir Lock	1817	1300	1.82 m (6.0 ft)	4.94 km (3.07 mi)	Magna Carta Island	
F	Penton Hook Lock	1815		1.22 m (4.0 ft)	4.33 km (2.69 mi)	Savory's	Tims', Egham
F	Chertsey Lock	1813		1.22 m (4.0 ft)	3.13 km (1.94 mi)		Laleham
F	Shepperton Lock	1813		2.03 m (6.7 ft)	3.32 km (2.06 mi)		
G	Sunbury Lock	1812	1623	1.87 m (6.1 ft)	4.75 km (2.95 mi)	Ballinger's	Shepperton Church, Weybridge
G	Molesey Lock	1815		1.87 m (6.1 ft)	4.79 km (2.98 mi)		Hampton
G	Teddington Lock	1811		2.68 m (8.8 ft)	7.74 km (4.81 mi)	Kingston	Surbiton, Ravens Ait, Thames Ditton
Richmond Lock		1894		2 m (6.6 ft)	4.9 km (3.0 mi)		Hammerton's, Twickenham

Additionally, Blake's Lock is located on a reach of the River Kennet that is administered by the Environment Agency as part of the River Thames within patch D and is often counted as a Thames Lock. It is the only manual Thames lock below Oxford.

The tide flows as far as Teddington Lock: the weir at Richmond Lock is only used at low tide, to maintain the water level above it.

Chalmore Lock (1838) was removed in 1883.

== See also ==
- Thames Barrier
- Crossings of the River Thames
- Islands in the River Thames
- Tributaries of the River Thames
