= Henley Bridge =

Bridge in Henley-on-Thames, England

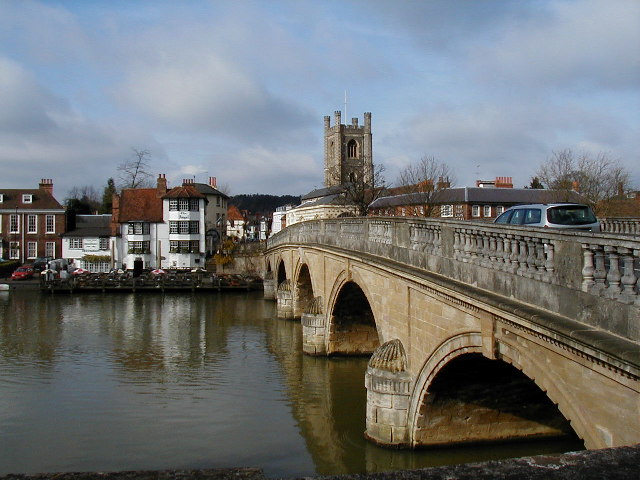
- The upstream side of the bridge at Henley-on-Thames from near the Henley Royal Regatta headquarters on the Berkshire bank
- Coordinates: 51°32′15″N 0°54′01″W
- Carries: A4130 road, Thames Path
- Crosses: River Thames
- Locale: Henley-on-Thames
- Heritage status: Grade I listed structure

Characteristics
- Design: Arch
- Material: Stone
- Height: 14 feet 3 inches (4.34 m)
- No. of spans: 5
- Piers in water: 4

History
- Opened: 1786

Location
- Interactive map of Henley Bridge

Henley Bridge Act 1781
- Act of Parliament
- Parliament of Great Britain
- Long title: An Act for building a Bridge over the River Thames, at the Town of Henley upon Thames, in the County of Oxford, and making commodious Avenues thereto; for widening some Part of the High Street and the Market Place; for lighting and watching; for regulating the Footways in, and for removing Nuisances, Obstructions, and Annoyances from the said Town.
- Citation: 21 Geo. 3. c. 33
- Territorial extent: Great Britain

Dates
- Royal assent: 18 May 1781
- Commencement: 31 October 1780 (Note: Start of session.)
Other legislation
Amended by	Henley Bridge Act 1808; Henley Bridge Act 1836

Status: Amended

Text of statute as originally enacted

Henley Bridge Act 1808
- Act of Parliament
- Parliament of the United Kingdom
- Long title: An Act for altering and amending an Act of His present Majesty, for building a Bridge over the River Thames at Henley-upon-Thames in the County of Oxford.
- Citation: 48 Geo. 3. c. cxi
- Territorial extent: United Kingdom

Dates
- Royal assent: 18 June 1808
- Commencement: 18 June 1808 (Note: The Acts of Parliament (Commencement) Act 1793.)
Other legislation
Amends	Henley Bridge Act 1781
Amended by	Henley Bridge Act 1836

Status: Amended

Text of statute as originally enacted

Henley Bridge Act 1836
- Act of Parliament
- Parliament of the United Kingdom
- Long title: An Act for amending and enlarging the Powers of the several Acts for building a Bridge over the River Thames at Henley-upon-Thames in the County of Oxford.
- Citation: 6 & 7 Will. 4. c. xl
- Territorial extent: United Kingdom

Dates
- Royal assent: 19 May 1836
- Commencement: 19 May 1836
Other legislation
Amends	Henley Bridge Act 1781; Henley Bridge Act 1808

Status: Current legislation

Text of statute as originally enacted

Henley Bridge is a road bridge built in 1786 over the River Thames, between Henley-on-Thames, in Oxfordshire, and Remenham, in Berkshire. The bridge has five elliptical stone arches, and links Hart Street in Henley with White Hill (designated the A4130) in Remenham. It crosses the Thames on the reach between Hambleden Lock and Marsh Lock, carrying the Thames Path across the river. It is a Grade I listed building.

== History ==
This point of the Thames has been used for crossing since ancient times. The current bridge replaced an earlier wooden structure, the foundations of which can be seen in the basement of the Henley Royal Regatta headquarters nearby on the Berkshire side. However, the remains of two stone arches on both sides of the river indicate the existence of an even more ancient stone bridge prior to the timber structure. This bridge has been identified by some authors as the bridge which the Romans crossed pursuing the Britons in 43AD, as described by Dion Cassius. This hypothesis is refuted by many other authors. The earliest recording of a bridge is in the Patent Rolls of 1232. In 1354, two granaries were leased on the bridge, which was timber on stone piers and several chapels are recorded. It was carried away in the great flood of 1774, but part of the eastern abutment is built on the intact easternmost span of the original 12th-century bridge.

== Present bridge ==
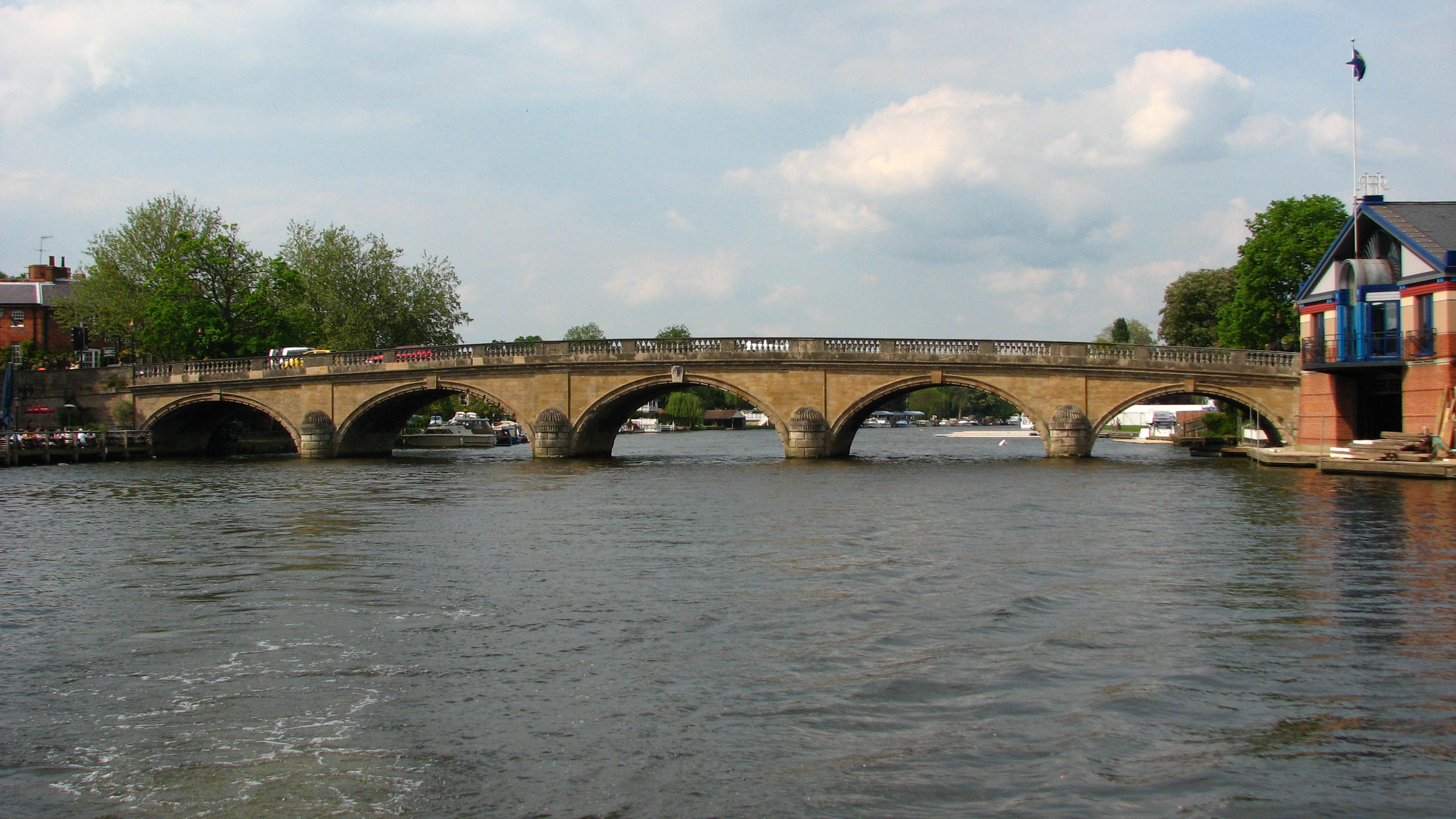
Front view from upstream

It was originally designed in 1781 by William Hayward of Shrewsbury, who died in 1782 before the construction of the bridge had begun. The bridge was built by the Oxford mason John Townesend. at a cost of approximately £10,000.

Sculptures of Isis and Tamesis by Anne Seymour Damer are at the keystone of the central arch on each side of the bridge. Tamesis faces the north (downstream section of the bridge) and Isis the south (upstream section). The original models for these can be seen in the Henley Gallery at the nearby River and Rowing Museum.

In June 1829, the bridge was the finishing line for the first Oxford and Cambridge university boat race. The start of the course was 2.25-mile (3.62 km) downstream at Hambleden Lock. Oxford won the race, with an estimated 20,000 spectators in attendance.

=== Damage and repair in 2010 and 2011 ===
In August 2010 the bridge was damaged by a boat named Crazy Love. A £200,000 repair programme commenced the following year

=== Battle of the bridge lights ===
Strings of white LED bulbs were attached to the Grade I listed crossing in March 2018 by artist Clive Hemsley. This was done without permission from the district and county councils and the artist was instructed to remove the lights. He claimed to have received scores of messages of support from people wanting the lights to remain permanently, including one from the Mayor of Henley. The artist subsequently applied for planning permission, which was refused. The district council conservation team stated: "As previously advised, the conservation team maintain concerns that this proposal is not appropriate to the special historic and architectural interest of the listed building and fails to recognise the reasons for its listing at such a high grade. It would similarly pose an alteration to its setting which would not serve to enhance its interest or that of its setting, the Henley Conservation Area. The scheme remains insufficiently justified and is unlikely to be able to be able to demonstrate a sufficient level of public benefits to overcome harm to such a significant building."

Further efforts to resurrect the lights plan were made by a group calling themselves 'Make Henley Shine'. These plans were also rejected. The proposals remain deeply controversial with passionate supporters and objectors alike.

== Adjacent features ==
Leander Club, one of the oldest rowing clubs in the world, is also close to the bridge on the Berkshire side. On the Oxfordshire (Henley) side are the Angel on the Bridge riverside public house and the Red Lion Hotel, an old coaching inn. St Mary the Virgin, the main civic church in Henley with its tower dominating the view, is also close by.

== See also ==
- Crossings of the River Thames

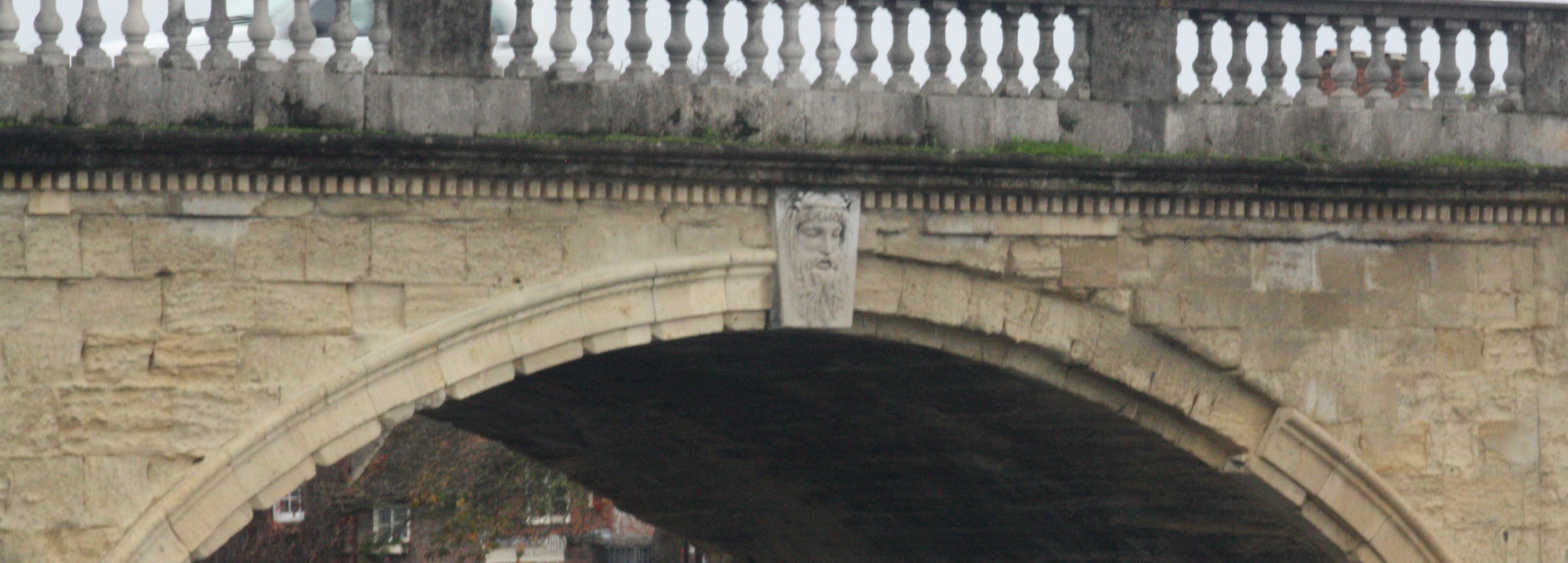
Sculpture of Tamesis by Anne Seymour Damer

== Bibliography ==
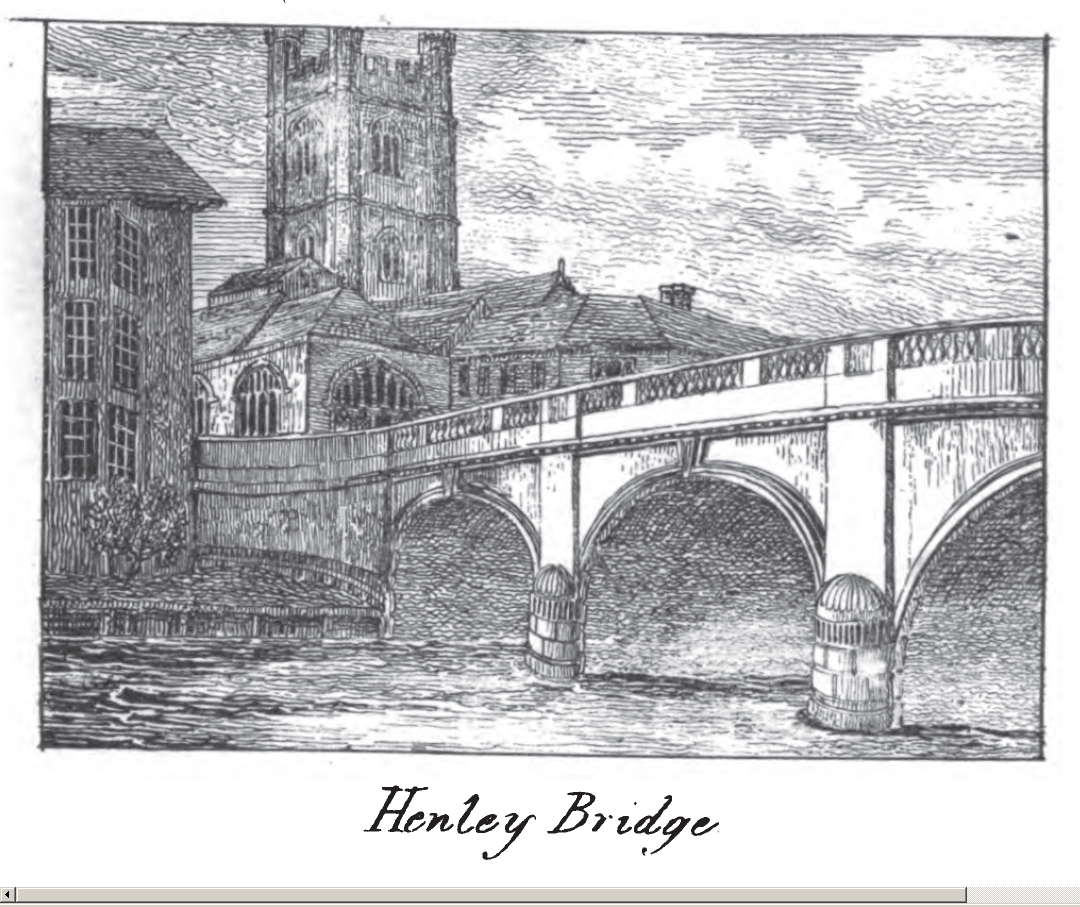
Illustration of The Henley Guide (1826)

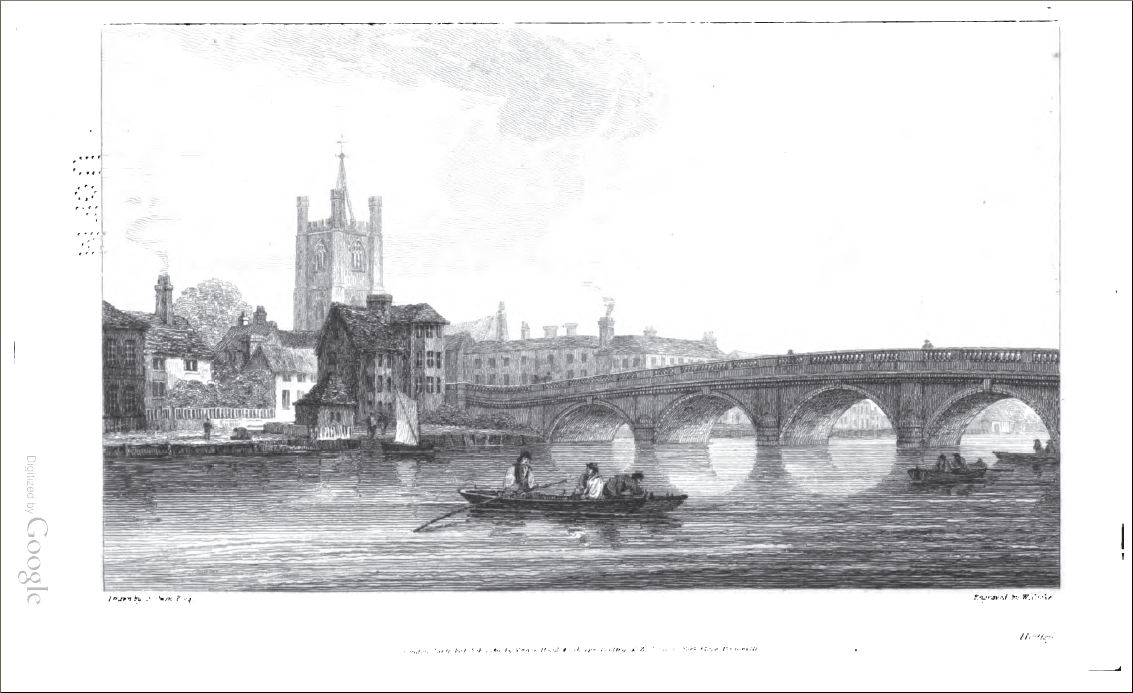
The bridge as illustrated in William Cooke's book

- The Henley Guide. With fifteen illustrations, London: Hickman and Stapledon, 1826
- Cooke, William Bernard; Owen, Samuel (1811), The Thames, or, Graphic illustrations of seats, villas, public buildings, & picturesque scenery on the banks of that noble river. Vol. I, Pentonville: Printed for Vernor, Hood & Sharpe; and W.B Cooke by William Bell and Co.
- Ruddock, Ted (2008), Arch Bridges and Their Builders 1735-1835, Cambridge: Cambridge University Press, ISBN 978-0-521-09021-6
- Walpole, Horace (1891), Peter Cunningham (ed.), The letters of Horace Walpole, fourth earl of Orford, Volume 8, London: R. Bentley

Next bridge upstream	River Thames	Next bridge downstream
Shiplake Railway Bridge	Henley Bridge	Temple Footbridge
Next bridge upstream	Thames Path	Next bridge downstream
northern bank Sonning Bridge & Sonning Backwater Bridges	Henley Bridge	southern bank Temple Footbridge
