= Temple Lock =

Lock and weir on the River Thames in Buckinghamshire, England

Coordinates: 51.5521°N 0.793965°W

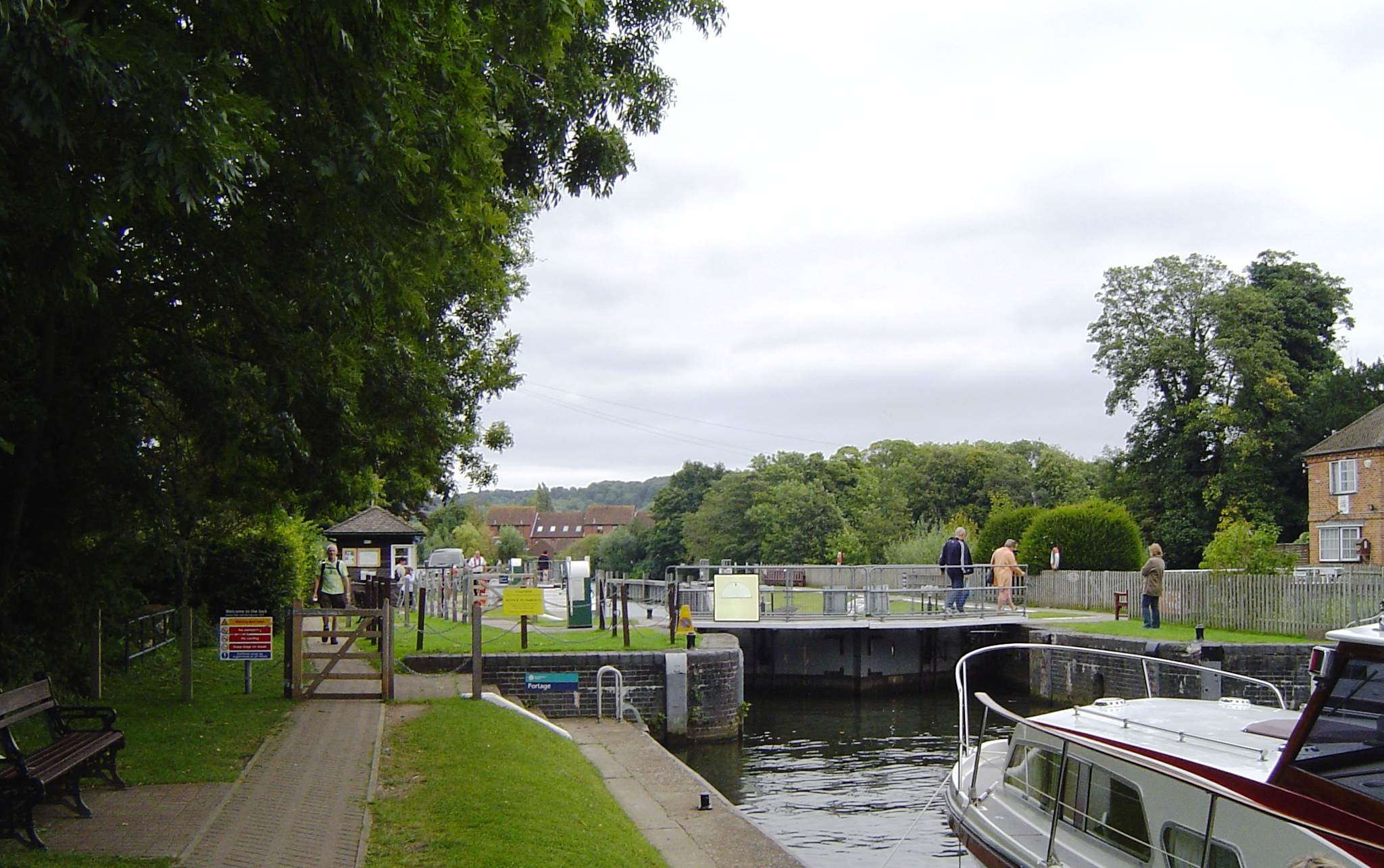
- Temple Lock looking downstream toward Temple Mill Island
- Waterway: River Thames
- County: Buckinghamshire
- Maintained by: Environment Agency
- Operation: Hydraulic
- First built: 1773
- Latest built: 1890
- Length: 41.02 m (134 ft 7 in)
- Width: 5.46 m (17 ft 11 in)
- Fall: 1.23 m (4 ft 1 in)
- Above sea level: 92'
- Distance to Teddington Lock: 39 miles

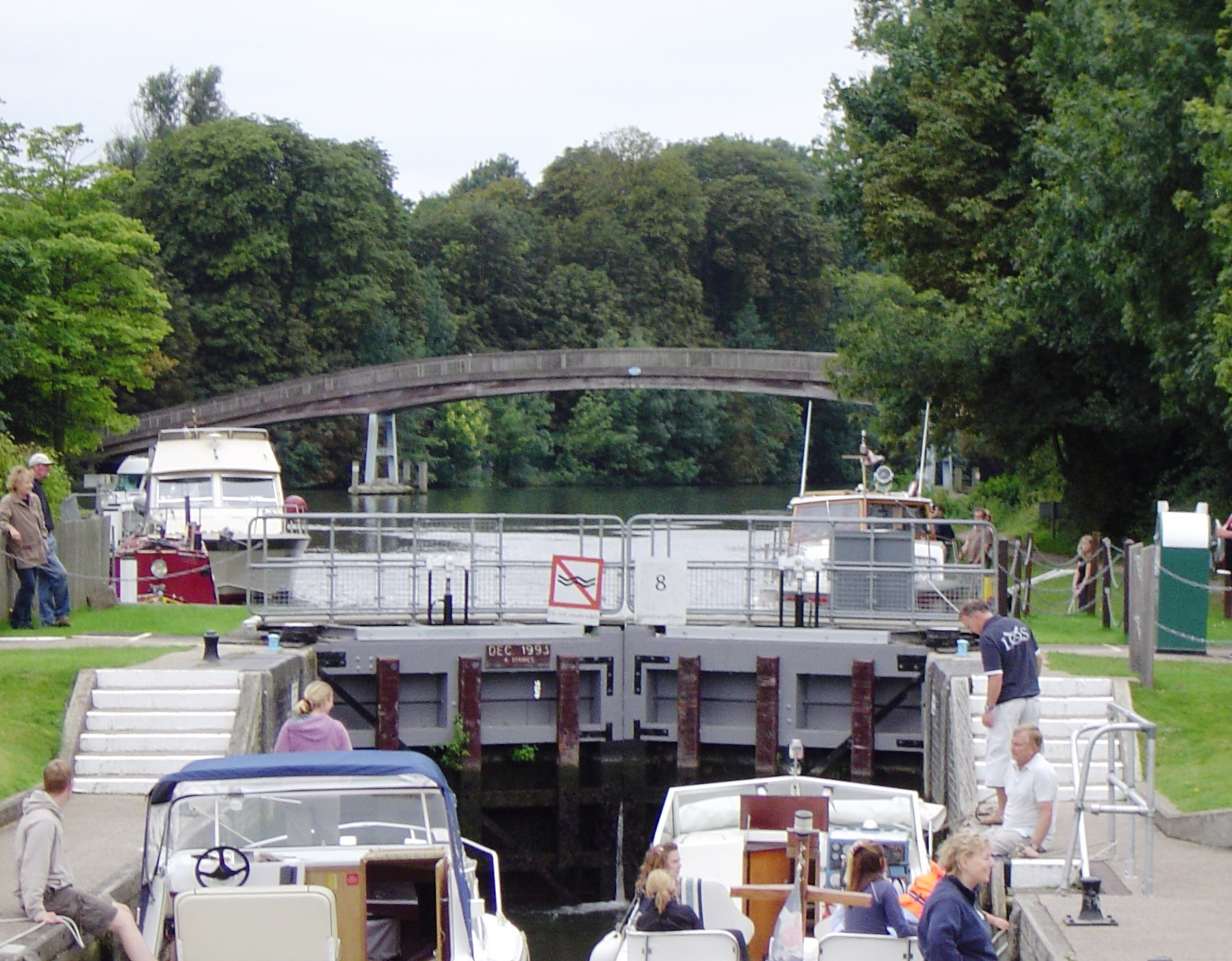
Looking upstream towards the footbridge

Temple Lock is a lock and weir situated on the Buckinghamshire bank of the River Thames near Temple Mill Island opposite Temple Meadows and not far from Hurley, Berkshire. It was first built by the Thames Navigation Commissioners in 1773.

The weir runs across from the lock to the Berkshire bank a short distance upstream of the lock.

== History ==
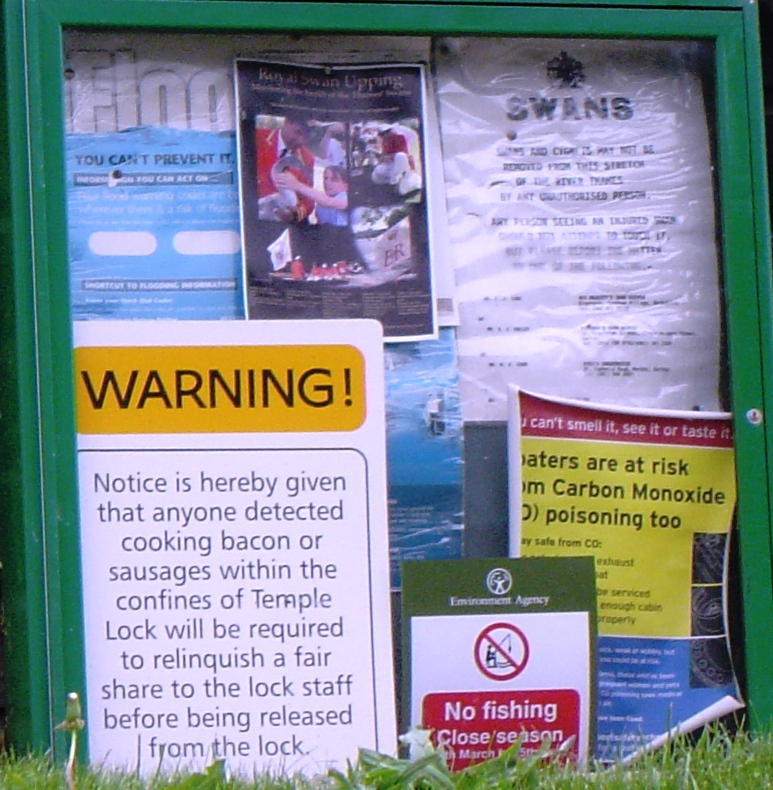
Warning notices at the lock

There are references to a flash lock and winch in the 16th century. There was also a ferry at the lock.

The pound lock was built in 1773, the sixth downstream of the eight constructed after the passing of the 1770 navigation act. Like the others it had to be rebuilt in 1782 and though estimates were obtained for stone and timber, timber was chosen because it was cheaper.

In 1890 a new lock was built alongside the original one.

== Access to the lock ==
The lock is on the Buckinghamshire bank and can only be reached on foot along the towpath from Marlow or Hurley.

== Reach above the lock ==
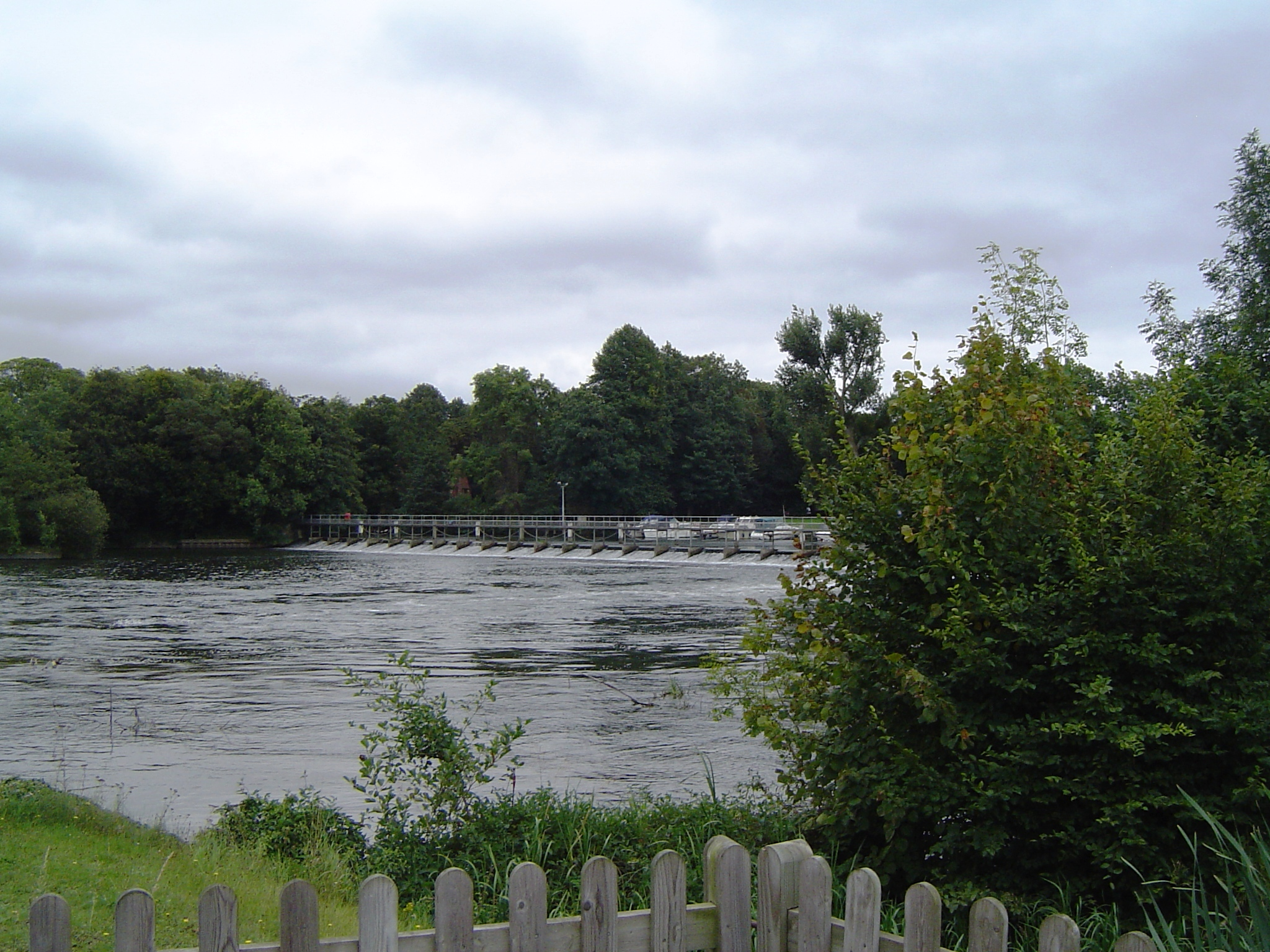
Weir at Temple Lock

The reach is one of the shortest on the river with little of note on it. There was formerly a ferry at the top of the lock cut taking the towpath across the river. In 1989 the Temple Footbridge was built across the river at this point to replace the ferry which had ceased operation in 1953.

=== Thames Path ===
The Thames Path crosses Temple Footbridge from the Buckinghamshire to Berkshire side. The path then crosses back across footbridges between the islands at Hurley where Hurley lock is located.

== See also ==
- Locks on the River Thames

Next lock upstream	River Thames	Next lock downstream
Hurley Lock; 1.03 km (0.64 mi)	Temple Lock; Grid reference: SU838843	Marlow Lock; 2.7 km (1.7 mi)
