= Temple Mill Island =

Island in the River Thames

Coordinates: 51.5526°N 0.7892°W

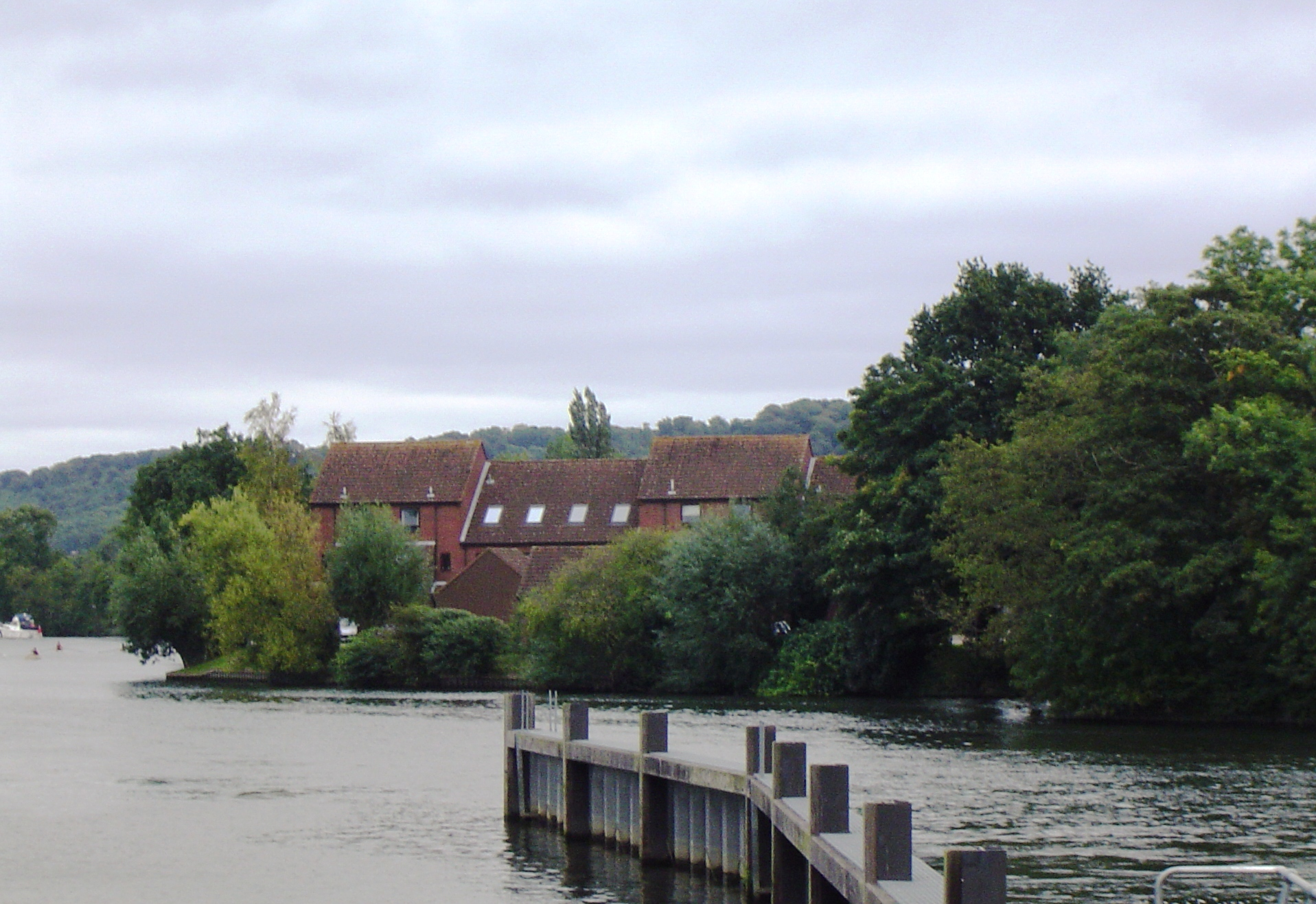
Temple Mill Island from Temple Lock

Temple Mill Island is an island in the River Thames in England upstream of Marlow, and just downstream of Temple Lock. It is on the southern Berkshire bank close to Hurley.

The island is named after the three watermills that used to be on the island for beating copper and brass. The island now has a modern housing development on it with a marina.

Daniel Defoe referred to the mills in his A tour thro' the Whole Island of Great Britain (1724–1727). He referred to the "three very remarkable mills, called Temple-Mills, for making Bisham Abbey Battery-work viz. Brass Kettles and Pans &c of all sorts. And these works were attended with no small success, till in the year 1720, they made a bubble of it; and then it ran the fate of all the Bubbles at that time".

== See also ==
- Islands in the River Thames

Next island upstream	River Thames	Next island downstream
Frog Mill Ait	Temple Mill Island	Gibraltar Islands
