= Hennerton Backwater =

River in England

Coordinates: 51.522523°N 0.877683°W

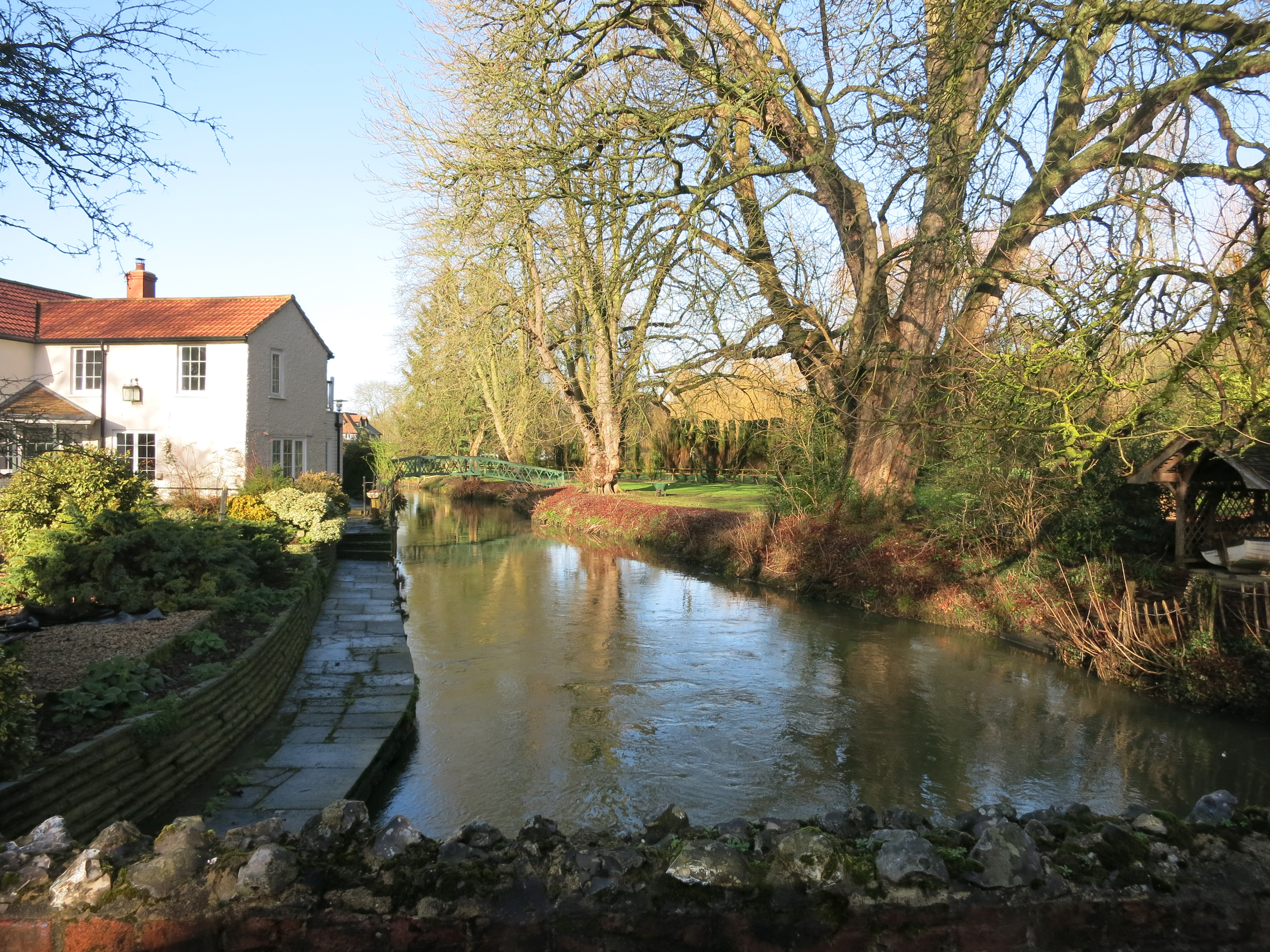
Hennerton Backwater at Wargrave

Hennerton Backwater is a narrow backwater of the River Thames on the reach above Marsh Lock near the villages of Shiplake, Oxfordshire and Wargrave, Berkshire.

Hennerton Backwater leaves the River Thames at the Unnamed Eyot, passing through Willow Marina, and rejoins just below Ferry Eyot. It is navigable by small boats from the downstream end for much of its length, but the bridge carrying Willow Lane over its upstream end has very limited clearance restricting passage to canoes and small dinghies even under favourable conditions.

The island formed by the backwater and the Thames comprises Wargrave Marsh (now mostly drained) and Lashbrook Eyot (no longer distinct), and contains housing, farmland, and the premises of Henley Sailing Club.

== In literature ==
In Jerome K. Jerome's 1889 humorous novel, Three Men in a Boat. The narrator describes traversing the backwater during the course of his boat trip along the Thames.

== See also ==
- Tributaries of the River Thames

| Next confluence upstream | River Thames | Next confluence downstream |
| River Loddon | Hennerton Backwater | River Wye |
