= Schlee =

Schlee is a surname. Notable people with the name include:

- Aldyr Schlee (1934–2018), Brazilian writer, journalist, translator, illustrator and professor
- Ann Schlee (1934–2023), American-born English novelist
- Charles Schlee (1873–1947), American racing cyclist
- Clive Schlee, British businessman
- Collin Schlee (born 2001), American football player
- John Schlee (1939–2000), American golfer
- Nick Schlee (born 1931), English painter
- Rudolf Schlee, recipient of the Knight's Cross of the Iron Cross
- Thomas Daniel Schlee (1957–2025), Austrian composer, arts administrator, and organist
- Valentina Schlee (c.1899–1989), Russian émigrée American-based fashion designer and theatrical costume designer
