= Landscape with Rainbow, Henley-on-Thames =

Painting by Jan Siberechts

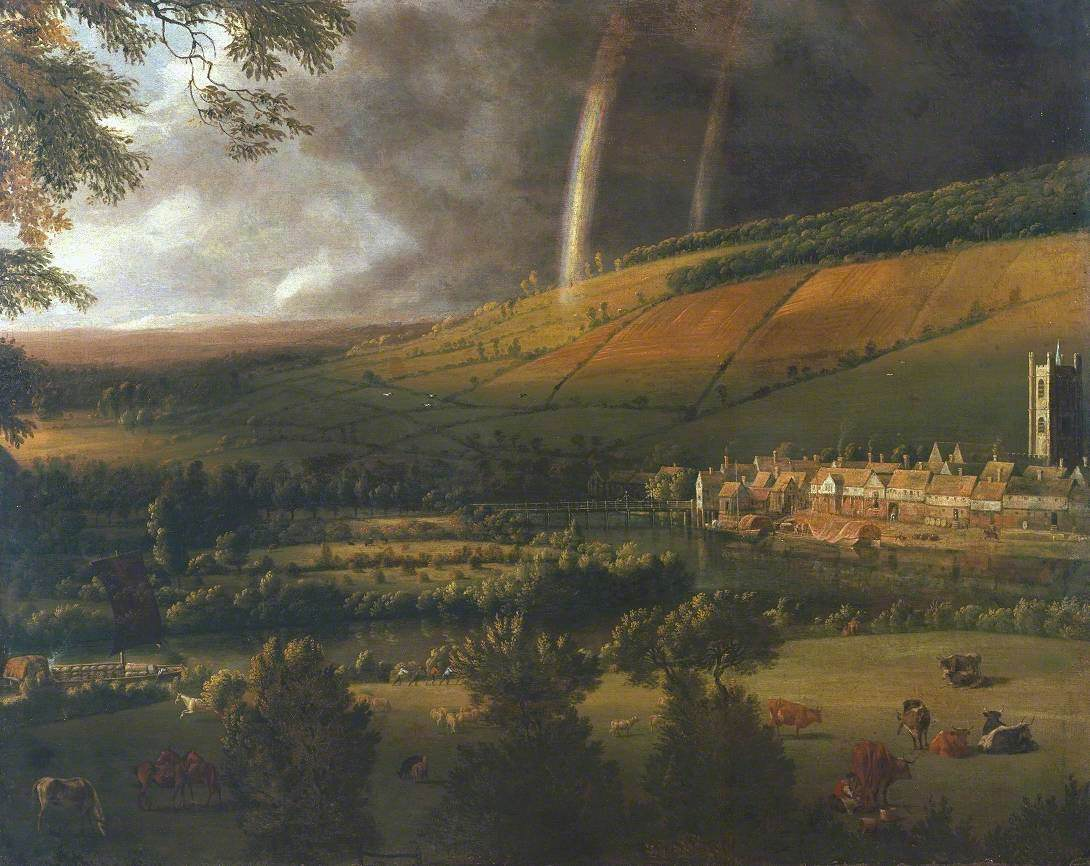
- Artist: Jan Siberechts
- Year: c.1690
- Type: Oil on canvas, landscape painting
- Dimensions: 82.5 cm × 103 cm (32.5 in × 41 in)
- Location: Tate Britain; London

Landscape with Rainbow, Henley-on-Thames is a c.1690 landscape painting by the Flemish artist Jan Siberechts featuring a panoramic view of the town of Henley-on-Thames on the border of Berkshire and Oxfordshire in Southern England.

Siberechts settled in England, where he became known for painting birdseye views of country estates. He was an influential figure in early British landscape painting. While the perspective is distorted, it is essentially topographically accurate. The painting is in the Tate Britain in London, one of the earliest landscapes in the collection, having been acquired in 1967.

In 1698, Siberechts produced another panoramic view of the town, Henley from the Wargrave Road, held by the River & Rowing Museum in Henley.

== Bibliography ==
- Galinou, Mireille. City Merchants and the Arts, 1670–1720. Oblong, 2004.
- Vickery, Margaret Birney. Landscape and Infrastructure: Reimagining the Pastoral Paradigm for the Twenty-First Century. Bloomsbury Academic, 2021.
