= Marsh Lock =

Lock and weir on the River Thames in Berkshire, England

Coordinates: 51.52803°N 0.88710°W

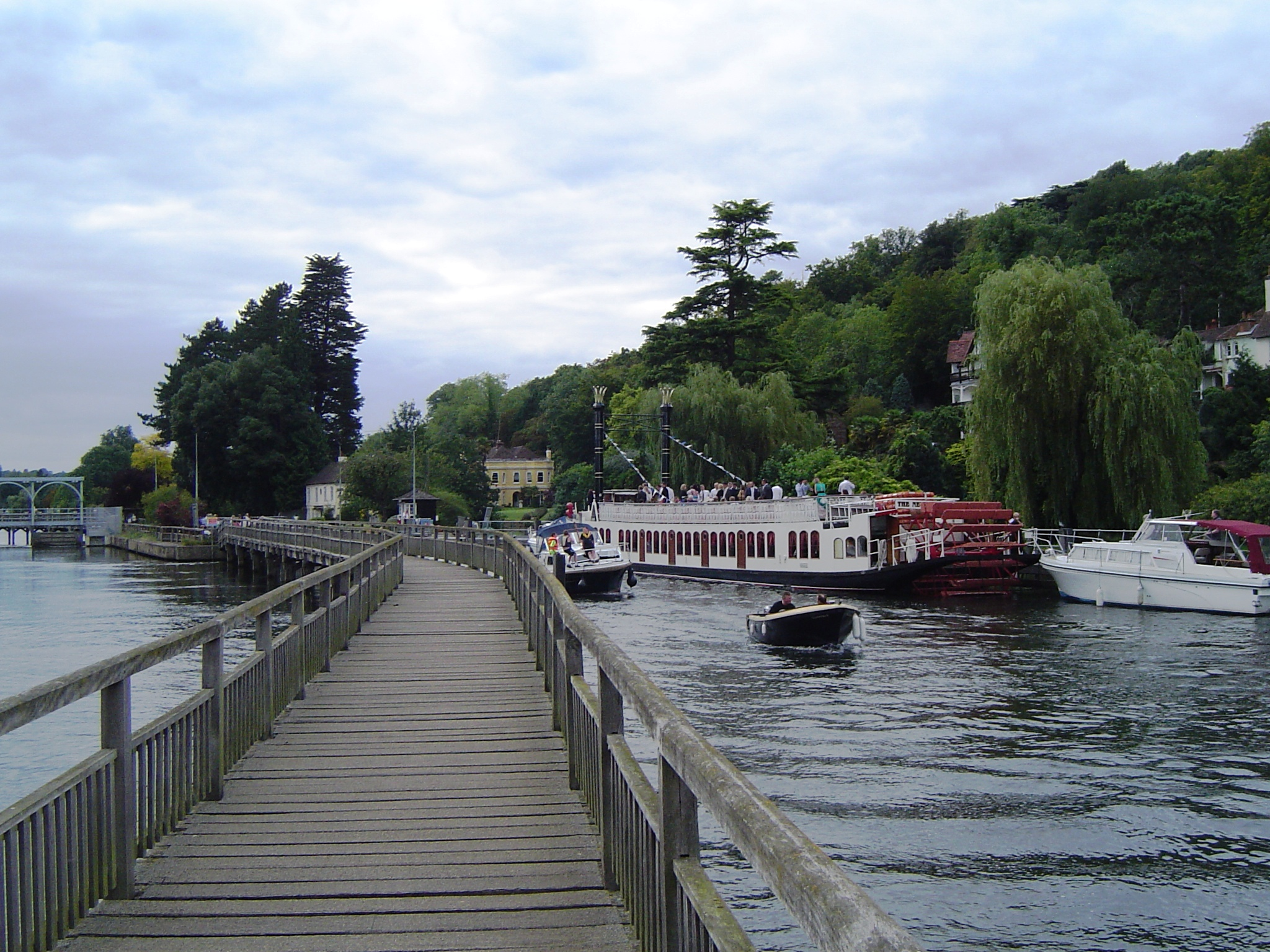
- Marsh Lock from the upstream walkway with the weir on the left
- Waterway: River Thames
- County: Berkshire
- Maintained by: Environment Agency
- Operation: Hydraulic
- First built: 1773
- Latest built: 1914
- Length: 41.19 m (135 ft 2 in)
- Width: 6.42 m (21 ft 1 in)
- Fall: 1.33 m (4 ft 4 in)
- Above sea level: 105'
- Distance to Teddington Lock: 46 miles

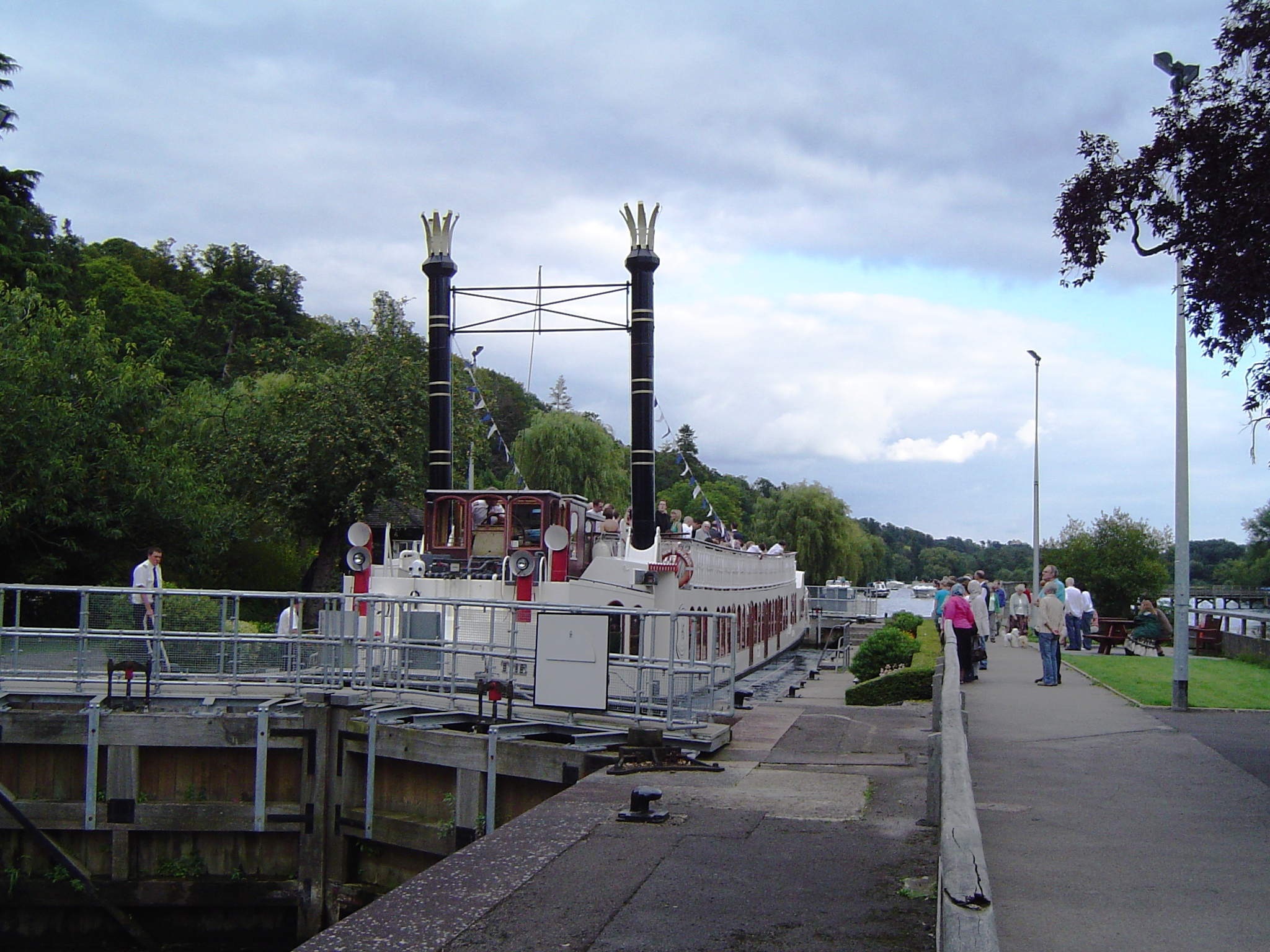
Marsh Lock filled by a large riverboat

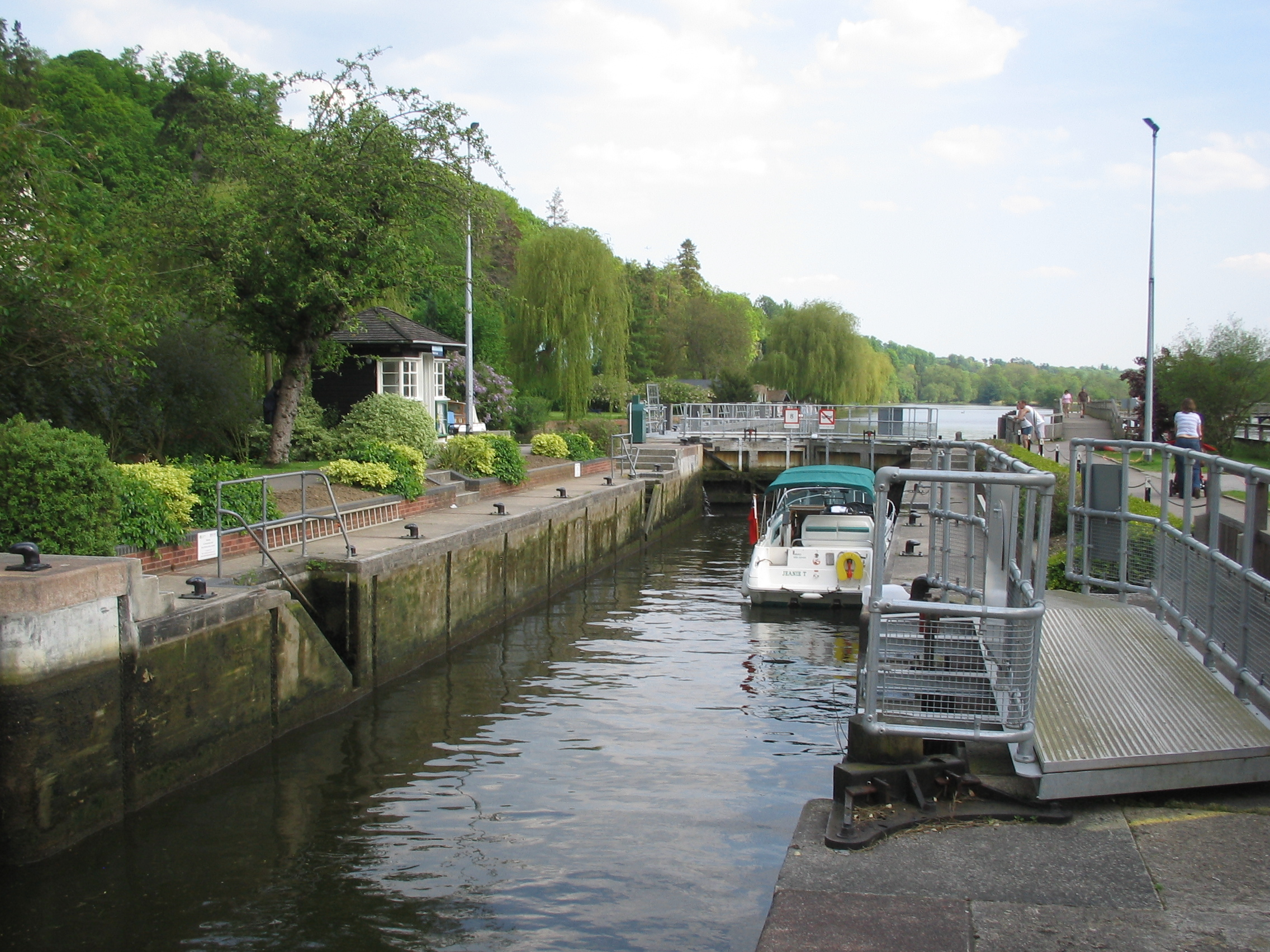
Marsh Lock empty from the tail gates

Marsh Lock is a lock and weir situated on the River Thames in the civil parish of Remenham, which is in the English county of Berkshire. The lock is about 1 mile (1.6 km) upstream of Henley Bridge and the centre of the Oxfordshire town of Henley-on-Thames. It is close to the Berkshire bank, but accessed from the Oxfordshire side via two long walkways, the downstream one being near Mill Meadows. The first pound lock was built by the Thames Navigation Commission in 1773. The weir consists of a series of iron watergates running from the lock to the Oxfordshire bank near the mills. It is situated between the two walkways.

== History ==
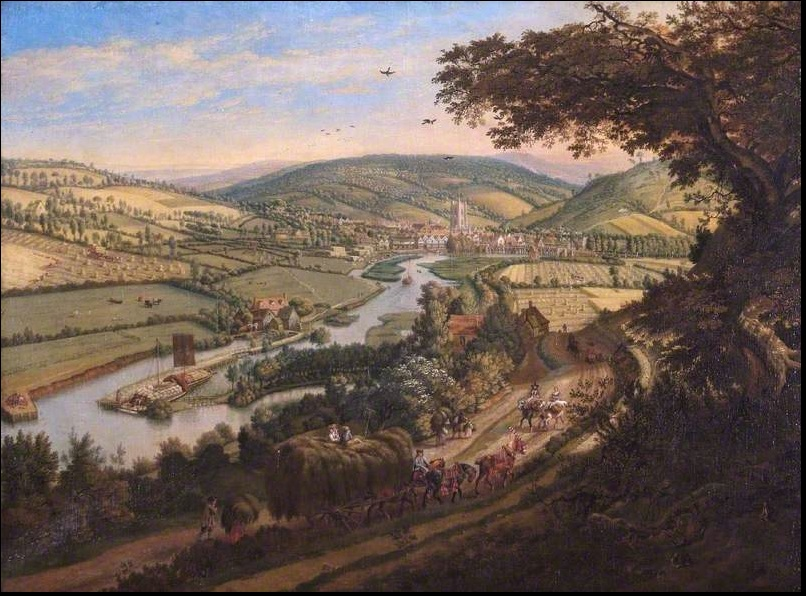
The flash lock in 1698, a detail of the painting Henley from the Wargrave Road by Jan Siberechts

The earliest record of a flash lock is in 1580, but the lock and weir existed for some time before that. The 1698 painting Henley from the Wargrave Road by the Flemish artist Jan Siberechts includes this original flash lock in the picture. The pound lock was the third downstream of the eight locks built after the Thames and Isis Navigation Act 1750 (24 Geo. 2. c. 8), and was completed in fir wood in 1773. Humphrey Gainsborough, a non-conformist minister at Henley Congregational Church, was concerned in the building of the lock. He was an inventor and the brother of the artist Thomas Gainsborough. By 1780, the lock was reported as decaying fast, and in 1787 it was rebuilt of oak. The first lock-house was built in 1813. Positioned as it was on the opposite side of the tow path, the lock was considered "Extremely inconvenient and dangerous for barges" in 1814, and there are some indications that the flash lock was still in use.

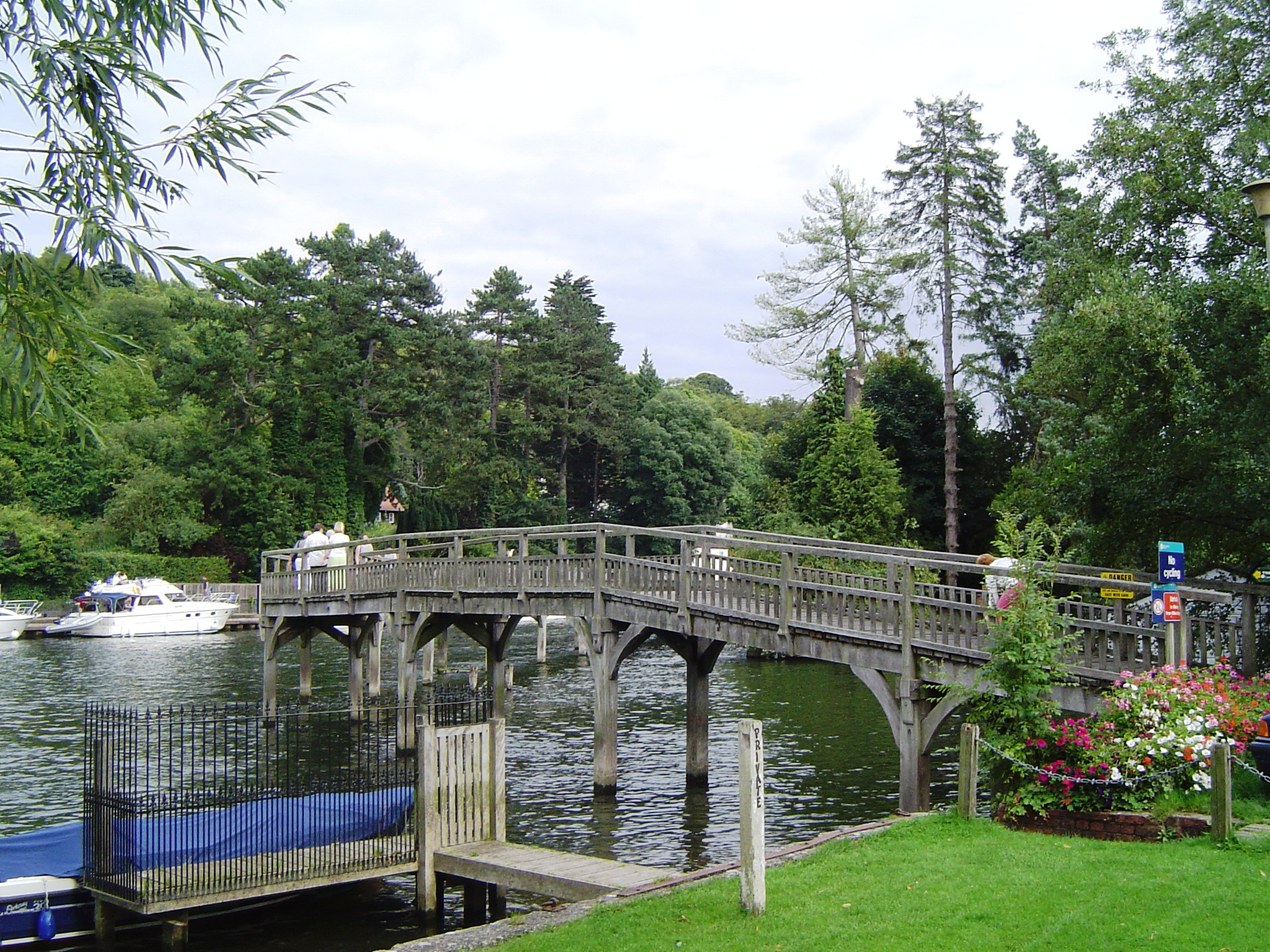
Lower walkway from Mill Meadows

In 1843 the lock was in poor condition and plans were drawn up to rebuild it on the opposite side of the river. However, these came to nothing and the lower walkway was built about this time. The weir was rebuilt after 1879, but with some complaints about its unattractiveness. There were again proposals to move the lock across the river, but it was rebuilt of more solid timber and reopened in 1886. The lock was rebuilt again in 1914. The weir was reconstructed in 2004 by Mowlem PLC to a design by Halcrow Group.

== Access to the lock ==
Because the lock is unusually situated on the opposite side of the river to the towpath, a long wooden bridge was built from the Oxfordshire bank to carry the path out to the lock island below the weir, and then back again to the riverbank above the weir. This feature is unique on the River Thames.

== Reach above the lock ==
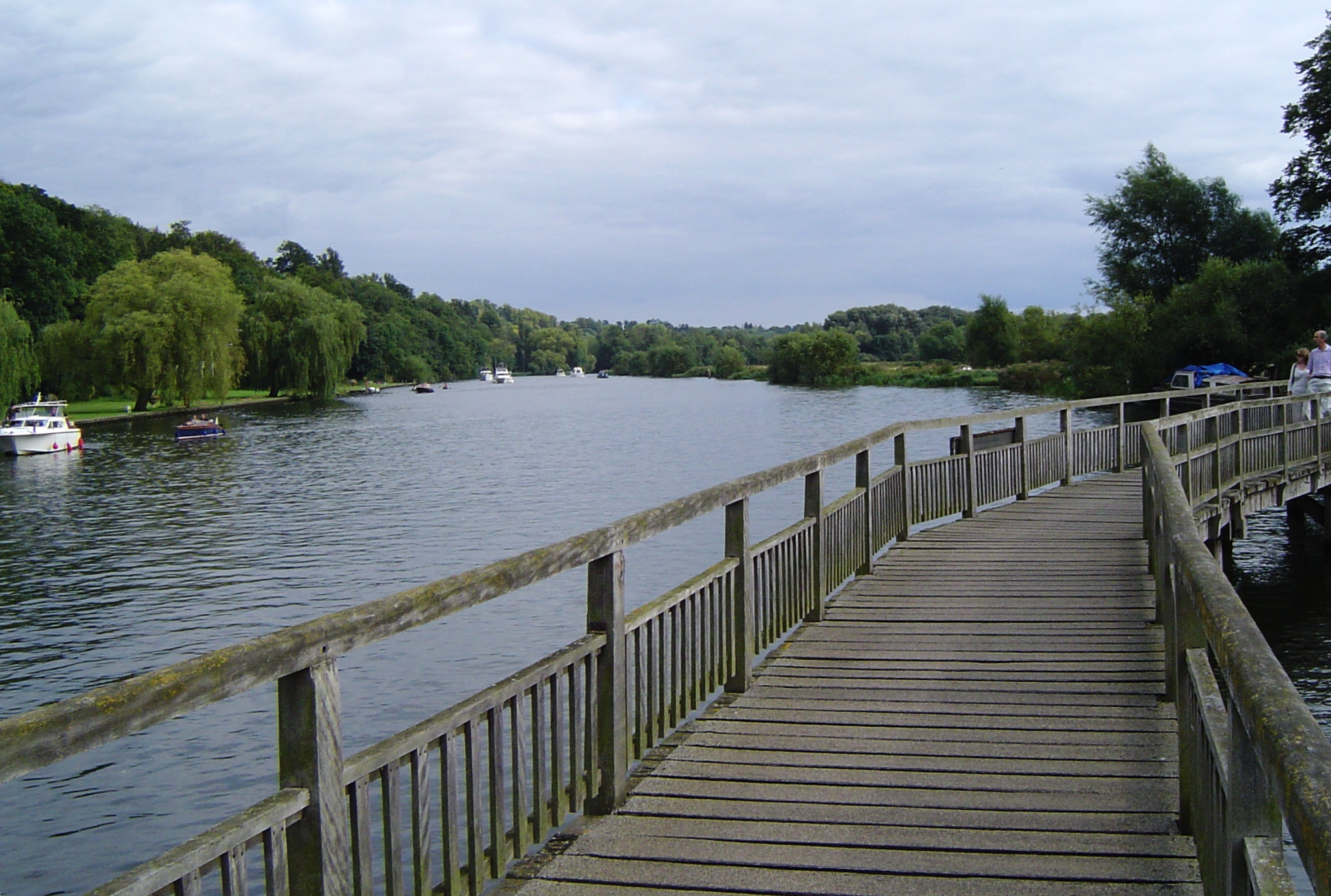
View upstream from the upstream walkway

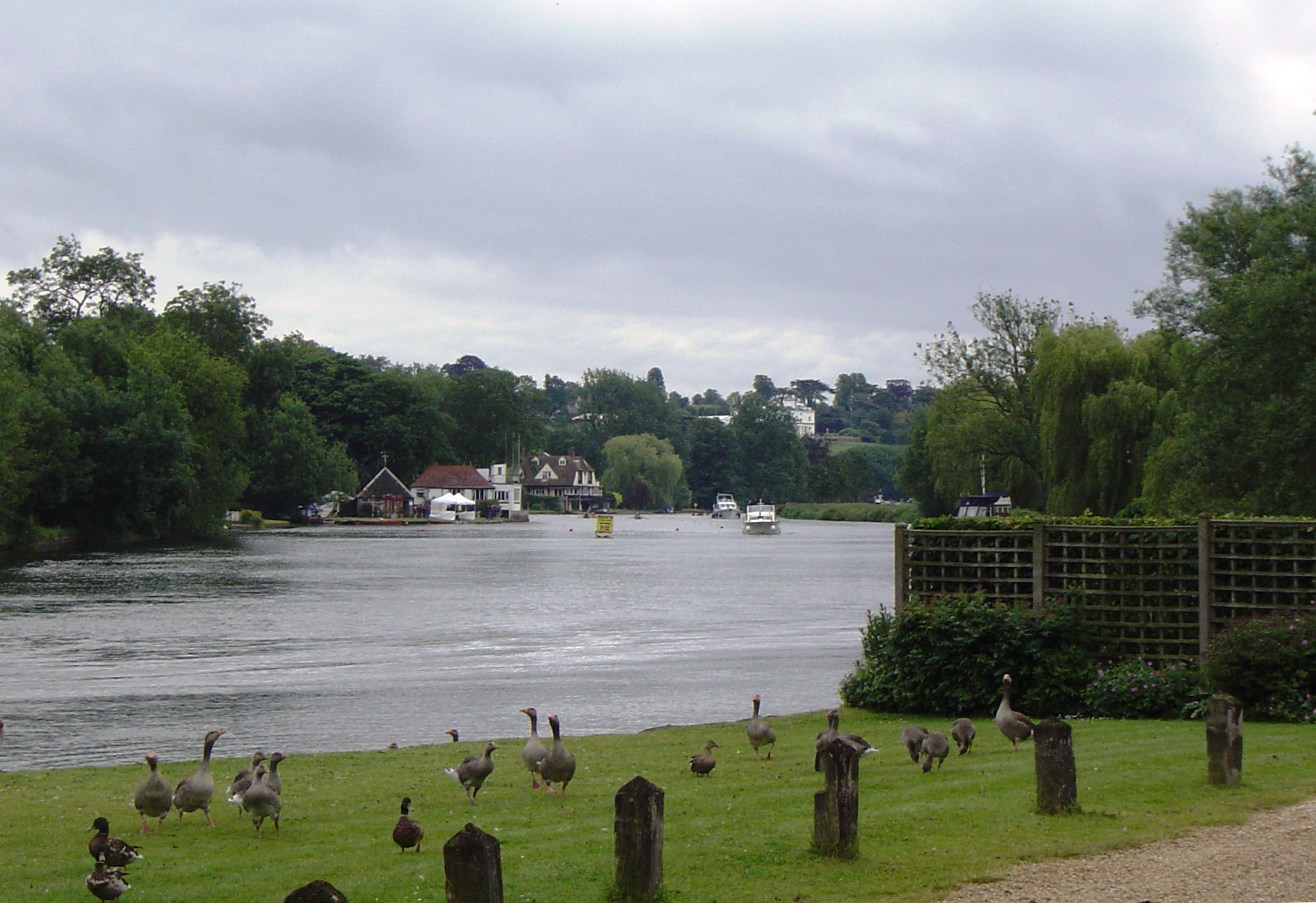
View of Wargrave across the river from Shiplake

At the lock and beyond it on the Berkshire bank, there are steep hills, which give way to Wargrave Marsh, an expanse of water meadows, after the entrance to the Hennerton Backwater. At this point, Bolney Ferry used to operate across the river. The island here is called Ferry Eyot, and it is followed by Poplar Eyot and Handbuck Eyot. This chain of islands lies off a range of large houses at Shiplake.

The river then rejoins Hennerton Backwater and passes Wargrave on the Berkshire bank, while there is then open farmland on the Shiplake bank. The River Loddon flows in on the Berkshire side, and the river is crossed by Shiplake Railway Bridge just below Shiplake Lock. The Wargrave & Shiplake Regatta takes place on the reach downstream of the railway bridge in August.

== Thames Path ==
The Thames Path follows the river on the western bank and then takes a diversion through Shiplake, rejoining the river at Shiplake Lock. This diversion arises because: firstly, the towpath used to cross the river at Bolney Ferry and return at Lashbrook Ferry, a short way upstream; secondly, there is no easy access to rejoin the path for the section between Lashbrook Ferry and Shiplake Lock.

== See also ==
- Locks on the River Thames
- Rowing on the River Thames
- River and Rowing Museum

Next lock upstream	River Thames	Next lock downstream
Shiplake Lock; 4.80 km (2.98 mi)	Marsh Lock; Grid reference: SU773816	Hambleden Lock; 4.59 km (2.85 mi)
