= Schleef =

Schleef is a surname. Notable people with the surname include:

- Einar Schleef (1944–2001), German dramatist, director, set designer, writer, painter, photographer, and actor
- Hans Schleef (1920–1944), Luftwaffe pilot and recipient of the Knight's Cross of the Iron Cross during World War II
- Marco Schleef (born 1999), German footballer
- Wilhelm Schleef, Wehrmacht machine gunner and recipient of the Knight's Cross of the Iron Cross during World War II

== See also ==
- Schlee, surname
