= Rod Eyot =

Island in the River Thames, England

Coordinates: 51.5325°N 0.8933°W

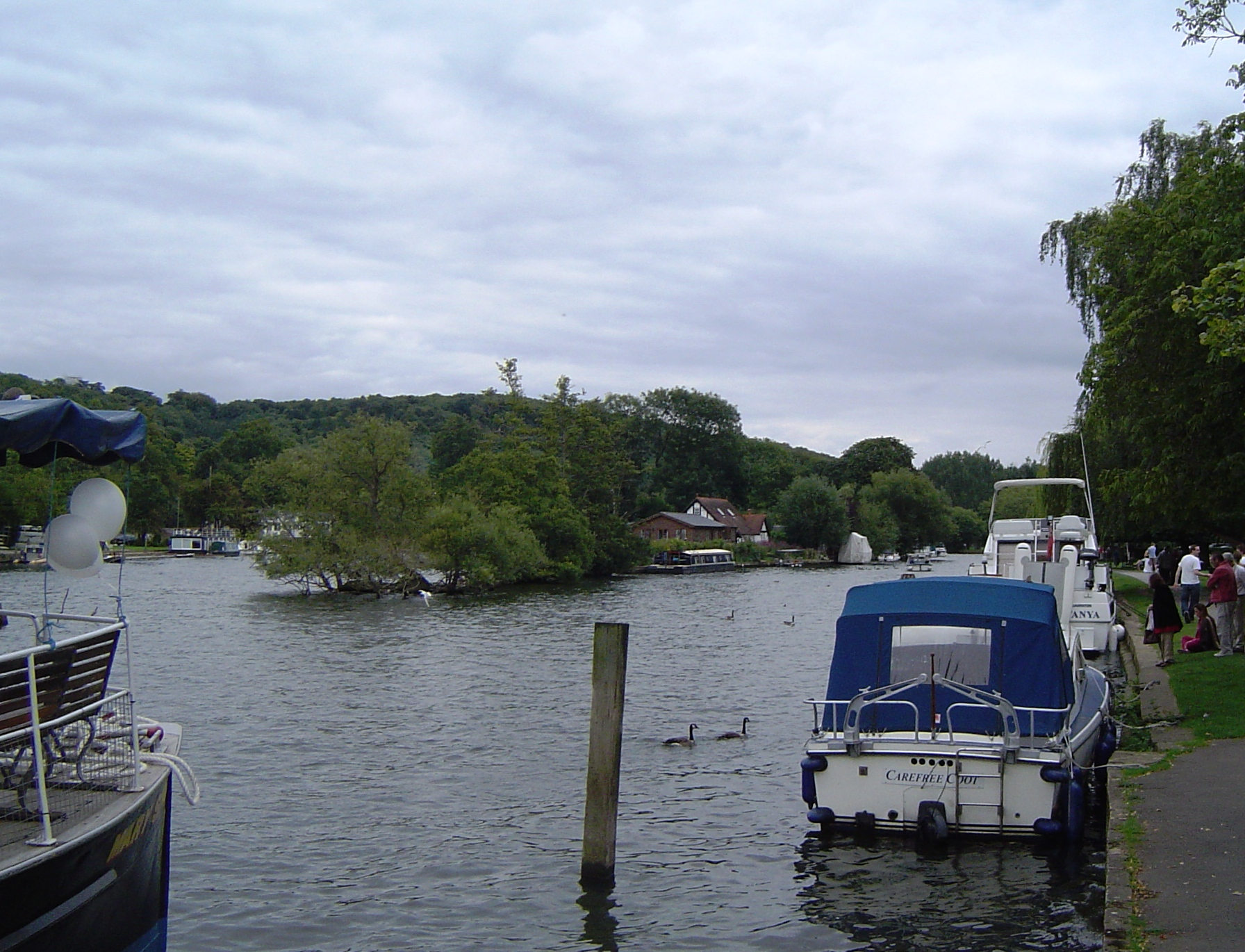
Rod Eyot from the Henley direction

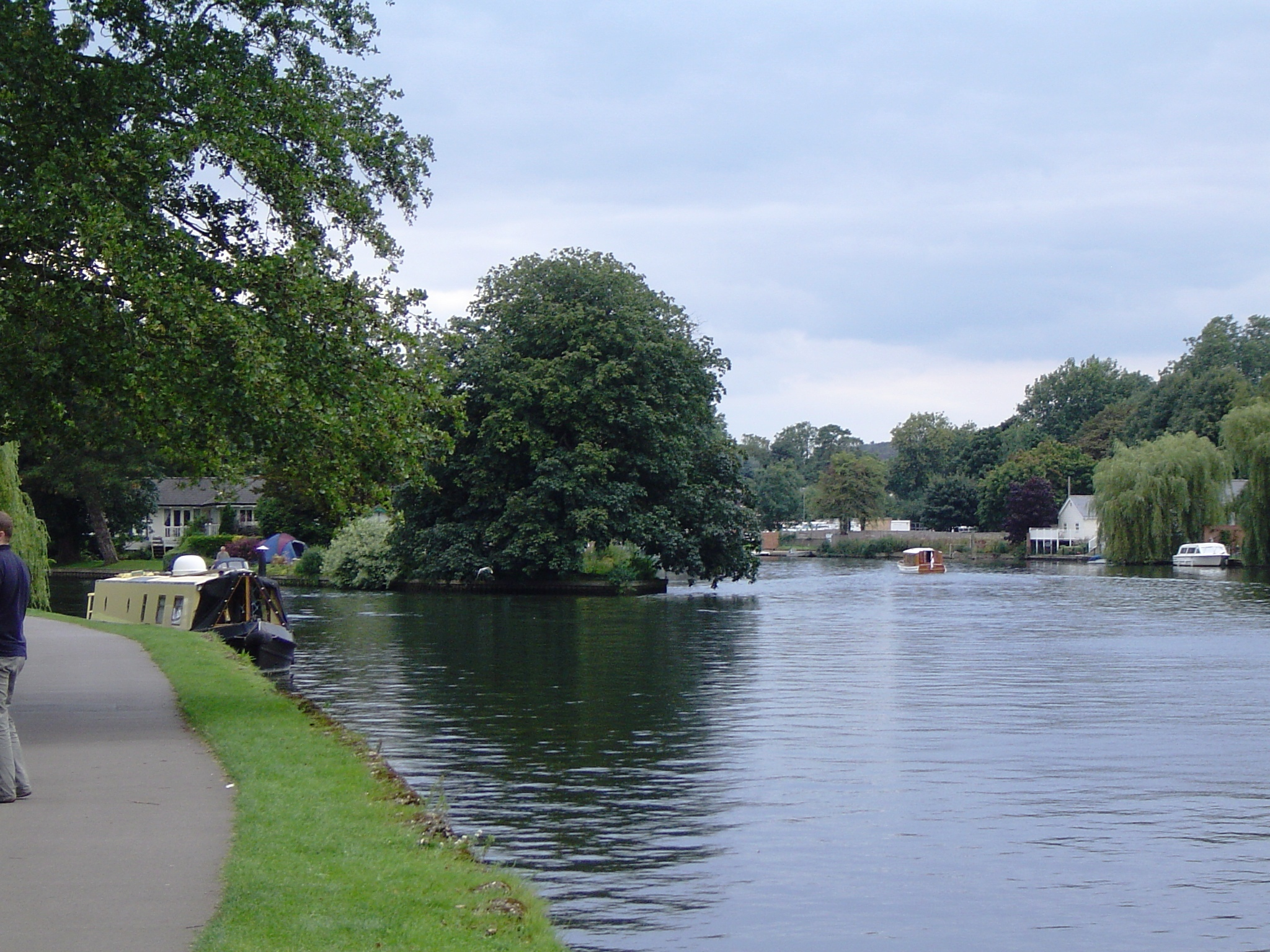
Rod Eyot from upstream

Rod Eyot or Rod Ait is an island in the River Thames in England near Henley-on-Thames on the reach above Hambledon Lock. It is close to Mill Meadows and the River and Rowing Museum.

== Overview ==
The island is populated with ten chalets, a brick cottage and formally tapered to a 200m widely spaced single-file line of trees, hence its name. The taper has been cut off and reduced; the soil on the main part of the island built up instead. Rod Eyot is accessible only by boat. Mid-stream, river traffic passes one-way both sides, instructed by the Environment Agency to keep to the right (starboard) bank. Rod Eyot homes have moorings and are privately owned. Foul waste and rubbish is taken away by boat to the appropriate stations at marinas.

Rod Eyot features in a pre-1900 painting owned by the monarch which portrays the river viewed from Wargrave Road when the island was the largest of a seasonally connected string of islands, lower-lying and uninhabited.

== Nearest amenities ==
Henley Town centre's closest public/amenity building is The Angel on the Bridge, followed by its church and the Red Lion Hotel. The bridge is 600 m from Rod Eyot.

== Islet within original island ==
A thin unpopulated islet downstream was part of the island, towards, Henley Bridge known locally as Bird Island.

Until 1907, when the Town Council sold the chalet plots, the island was among those known nationally for a few decades as Corporation Island. The brick cottage had previously been occupied by a farrier who shoed horses which towed the river barges.

== See also ==
- Islands in the River Thames

Next island upstream	River Thames	Next island downstream
Ferry Eyot	Rod Eyot	Temple Island
