= British Rowing =

British rowing association

- Sport: Rowing
- Founded: 1882
- Affiliation: World Rowing Federation
- Headquarters: 6 Lower Mall, Hammersmith, London W6 9DJ
- Chairman: Mark Davies
- CEO: Alastair Marks

Official website
- www.britishrowing.org
- (United Kingdom)

British Rowing, formerly the Amateur Rowing Association (ARA), is the national governing body for the sport of rowing (both indoor and on-water rowing). It is responsible for the training and selection of individual rowers and crews representing Great Britain and England, and for participation in and the development of rowing in England. Scottish Rowing (formerly SARA) and Welsh Rowing (formerly WARA) oversee governance in their respective nations, organise their own teams for the Home International Regatta and input to the GB team organisation.

British Rowing is a member of the British Olympic Association and the World Rowing Federation (formerly FISA).

== History ==
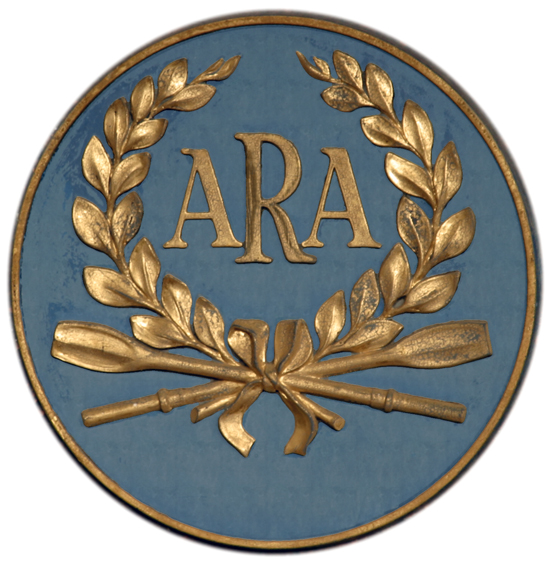
ARA plaque

The ARA (as the predecessor of British Rowing) had it roots in the desire to form crews drawn from the leading English clubs 'for the purpose of defeating the foreign or colonial invader' although in fact this aim was not fulfilled until much later.

A series of meetings were held in Putney from 1877 culminating in the formation of the Metropolitan Rowing Association in 1879 by Cambridge University Boat Club, Dublin University Boat Club, Kingston Rowing Club, Leander Club, London Rowing Club, Oxford University Boat Club, Royal Chester Rowing Club, Thames Rowing Club and Twickenham Rowing Club. Molesey Boat Club joined soon afterward.

In 1882 the Metropolitan Rowing Association changed its name to the Amateur Rowing Association, having gained additional member clubs from outside London, and began its evolution into the governing body of rowing.

In 1886 the ARA issued General Rules for Regattas. The ARA adopted Henley Royal Regatta's restrictive definition of "amateur" which not only excluded those who made their living as profession oarsmen but also anyone "who is or has been by trade or employment for wages a mechanic, artisan or labourer." Moreover, the new rules stated that only clubs affiliated to the ARA could compete in regattas held under ARA rules, and that ARA affiliated clubs could not compete under any other rules, nor against crews not affiliated to the ARA. This ruling was extremely socially divisive, effectively excluding any club with a socially mixed membership. It resulted in the formation of a breakaway organisation in 1890, the National Amateur Rowing Association, whose clubs could draw their membership from all social classes and occupations.

The schism in English rowing was to remain for over half a century as a regular cause of controversy and bad feeling. Change only came after the Australian national eight, preparing for the Berlin Olympics in 1936, was excluded from the Grand Challenge Cup at Henley because the crew, who were all policemen, were deemed to be 'manual workers'. The embarrassment caused persuaded the ARA and the Stewards of Henley Royal Regatta of the need for change, and on 9 June 1937, the offending references to manual labourers, mechanics, artisans and menial duties were deleted from the ARA rules, with Henley following suit the following day.

The ARA and NARA finally amalgamated in 1956.

David Lunn-Rockliffe, Executive Secretary of the ARA from 1976 to 1987 and later co-founder of the River and Rowing Museum at Henley-on-Thames, oversaw the transition to a more professional organization. In 1998, the ARA followed FISA in removing all references to amateurism from its rules. Professional rowers are now permitted. The name Amateur Rowing Association remained because of its heritage and because no agreement could be reached on alternatives. In 2009, a decision was taken to rename the organisation as 'British Rowing'.

Five English rowing clubs retained the right to appoint representatives directly to the Council of British Rowing. They were: London Rowing Club, Leander Club, Thames Rowing Club, Oxford University Boat Club and Cambridge University Boat Club. This right was, however, removed from the five clubs in September 2012.

Sir Steve Redgrave, multiple Olympic Gold medallist in rowing, was the Honorary President of British Rowing from 2001 until 2013. Dame Di Ellis, former chairman of British Rowing, succeeded him as Honorary President.

== Points system ==
British Rowing operates a points system to allow race organisers to arrange races among rowers of a similar standard. Each individual rower can acquire Personal Ranking Index (PRI) separately for sculling and sweep rowing, and the crews in which they compete have a Crew Ranking Index (CRI) representing the combined total of each crew member's PRI. While coxswains acquire a coxing PRI (in addition to a sweep rowing PRI and/or sculling PRI), this is not included in a CRI.

A PRI is based on the rower's performances in both head races and regattas, every time they race. The number of points allocated depends upon how well they do relative to others and how many crews race. Points reduce automatically over time, so will drop if a rower stops competing or reduces the number of races they enter. The maximum number of points available from one event is 145.

The PRI points system was introduced in September 2015. Prior to this, competitors gained points in both rowing and sculling by winning a qualifying race (a regatta race with more than 2 entries). When first joining British Rowing, all members begin at zero points. Points are increased by members winning qualifying regattas. The status levels were (high to low) Elite (ELI), Senior (SEN), Intermediate 1 (IM1), Intermediate 2 (IM2), Intermediate 3 (IM3), Novice (NV). Each crew members' points were added up and this determined the status of the crew. The crew was only allowed to race at this level or higher (e.g. an IM1 crew can only race at IM1, SEN or ELI). Anyone who had competed for the GB Senior, Lightweight or U23 international squads was given 12 points (then the maximum possible) and those representing GB at the World Rowing Junior Championships had their points topped up to 6. The new points system allows race organisers to divide entries more flexibly, depending on the entries received. The table below indicates the maximum number of points that could be held by a crew at each status level under the pre-2015 system:

	8 +/x	4 ±/x	2 -/x	1 x
Elite	no limit	no limit	no limit	no limit
SEN	72	36	18	9
IM1	48	24	12	6
IM2	32	16	8	4
IM3	16	8	4	2
Novice	0	0	0	0

=== Juniors ===
There are a number of junior age bands (J12, J13, J14, J15, J16, J17 and J18). The number represents the age competitors must be younger than, before the 1st of September preceding the competition. Sweep oar rowing is only allowed at J15 and older for both boys and for girls, due to possible issues of asymmetric muscle development. The cox of a junior crew must also be a junior, but can be from any age band.

== Coaching awards ==
British Rowing has an awards scheme for coaching that up until 2005 consisted of the Instructor's Award, Bronze Award, Silver Award and finally the Gold Award. These were overhauled in 2006 as qualifications were brought in line with the Sportscoach UK system that many other sports in the UK have adopted. British Rowing now offers the Level 2 (Session Coach and Club Coach), Level 3 (Senior Club Coach) and Level 4 (Advanced Coach) coaching awards and other related workshops and training courses.

== Nautilus Rowing Club ==
British Rowing occasionally fields boats under the name of the Nautilus Rowing Club (boat code NAU).

== See also ==
- Rowing Ireland
- Scottish Rowing
- Welsh Rowing
- Ratzeburg Test
