= Mill Meadows, Henley-on-Thames =

Park in Henley-on-Thames, Oxfordshire, England

Coordinates: 51.53169°N 0.89422°W

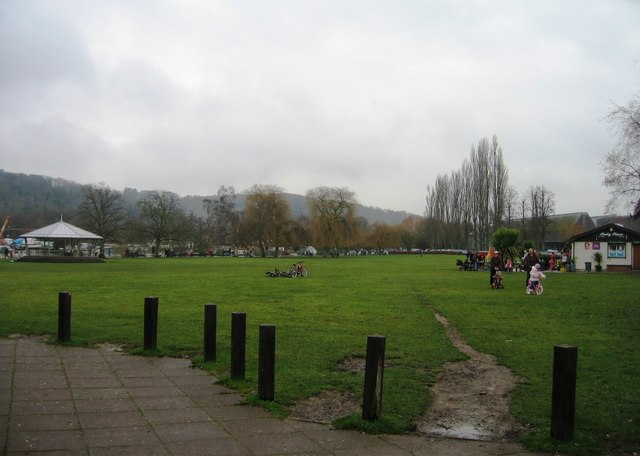
Mill Meadows on the River Thames at Henley-on-Thames, including the bandstand.

Mill Meadows is part of the flood plain of the River Thames at Henley-on-Thames, Oxfordshire, England. It is an area of natural beauty close to the town centre of Henley. Marsh Lock (which is adjacent to the site of the mill that the meadows are named after. The mill race still exists).

Rod Eyot and the River and Rowing Museum, established in 1998, are all close by. There is car parking available for visitors.

A boat service by Salters Steamers stops at the meadows, travelling to Reading on the river via Shiplake and Sonning.

Position: grid reference SU768820
