= National Amateur Rowing Association =

English rowing association

The National Amateur Rowing Association (NARA) was founded in 1890 to cater for the large number of working-class men who were prevented from joining the Amateur Rowing Association (ARA) by virtue of their manual occupations. (According to the interpretation of the narrow definition of Amateur status then enforced by the ARA rules, these men were to be considered professionals).

This definition of "amateur" was finally resolved in the 1920s and in 1930 NARA was reconstituted, its objectives being "to foster and encourage amateur rowing and to watch over and generally protect its interests." (Articles of Association 1930).

In 1939 NARA was incorporated as a non-profit making company.

The new body gained significant support though practically, the only difference between the two organisations was their outlook on the bar on manual labour; in all other respects the NARA was as strict about amateurism as the ARA. Its first president was the Duke of Fife and its last Lord Iveagh.

The organisation was however very different from that of the ARA, as the NARA was composed of ten self-governing regional associations:

- The Coast ARA
- Erith ARA
- Hampshire and Dorset ARA
- Midland ARA
- North London ARA
- Northern ARA
- Oxford ARA
- Thames ARA
- West of England ARA
- National Dock Labour Board Sports Association

All of these were actively engaged in organising regattas for their member clubs and around 90 regattas a year followed NARA rules.

== The End of the divide ==
From about 1929 discussions took place with ARA about the possibility of merging to form one governing body. In 1937 the ARA abolished its objectionable definition of "amateur", although it would still not recognise the suitability of any man who worked with boats to race against amateurs, and another 20 years went by before the sport was finally united under one governing body.

The Times leader at the time congratulated the ARA and the Henley Stewards on their decision to remove this "invidious bar", and remarked that most oarsmen had long regarded it as a blot on the sport.

In 1954 the NARA had around 130 affiliated clubs, compared to 245 affiliated to the ARA. Some clubs were affiliated to both governing bodies which finally amalgamated in 1956.. It was proposed to call the resulting organisation the British Amateur Rowing Association and NARA was dissolved in June of that year. (BARA as a name didn't last long and was soon shortened back to ARA).
