= David Lunn-Rockliffe =

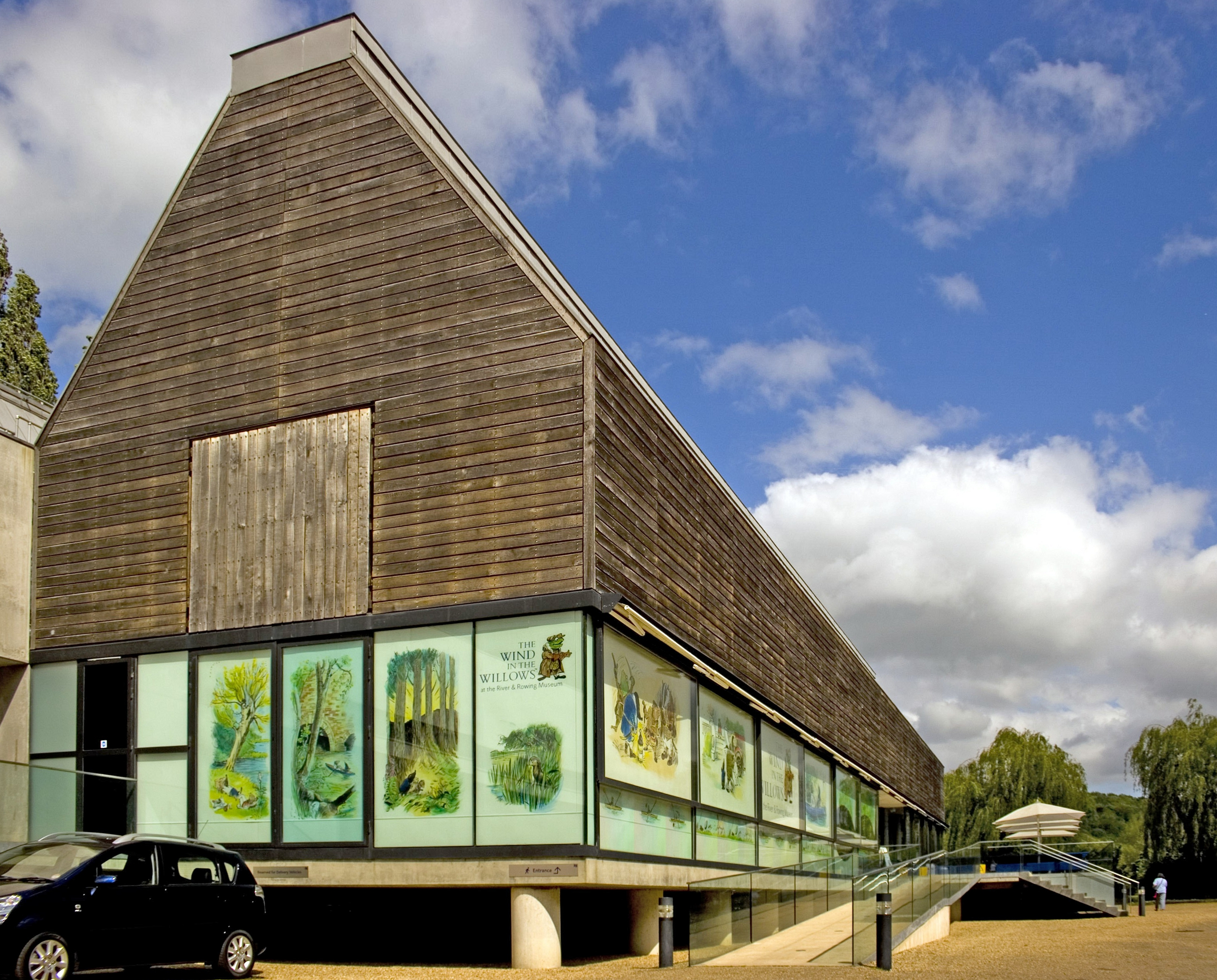
The River and Rowing Museum in Henley-on-Thames, co-founded by David Lunn-Rockliffe.

David Lunn-Rockliffe (28 December 1924 – 23 August 2011) was a British businessman, rowing supporter, and co-founder of the River and Rowing Museum in Henley-on-Thames, England.

Lunn-Rockliffe was the youngest son of an English father, a doctor, and Swiss mother. He was brought up near Winchester in Hampshire, southern England. He was educated at Stowe School and Jesus College, Cambridge, reading land economy, with a break between to serve with the Worcestershire Regiment in Burma during World War II. He started working as a dairy farmer in Hampshire, before becoming a development officer at the Institute of Corn and Agricultural Merchants. He later worked in the paint industry.

Lunn-Rockliffe was Executive Secretary of the Amateur Rowing Association (now known as British Rowing) in the United Kingdom from 1976 until 1987, overseeing the move towards a more professional organization. He was then central to the foundation of the River and Rowing Museum in Henley, opened by Queen Elizabeth II in November 1998. He took charge of negotiating a site close to the River Thames with Henley Town Council, engaging the architect David Chipperfield to design the award-winning museum building, and obtaining planning permission together with major sponsorship from the locally based businessmen Martyn Arbib and Urs Schwarzenbach.

David Lunn-Rockcliffe married Elizabeth Capron in 1950 and they lived in Wimbledon followed by Surbiton, both in southwest London. They had five daughters and she died in 2001 after they moved to Exeter in Devon.
