= Handbuck Eyot =

Island in the River Thames, England

Coordinates: 51.5154°N 0.8808°W

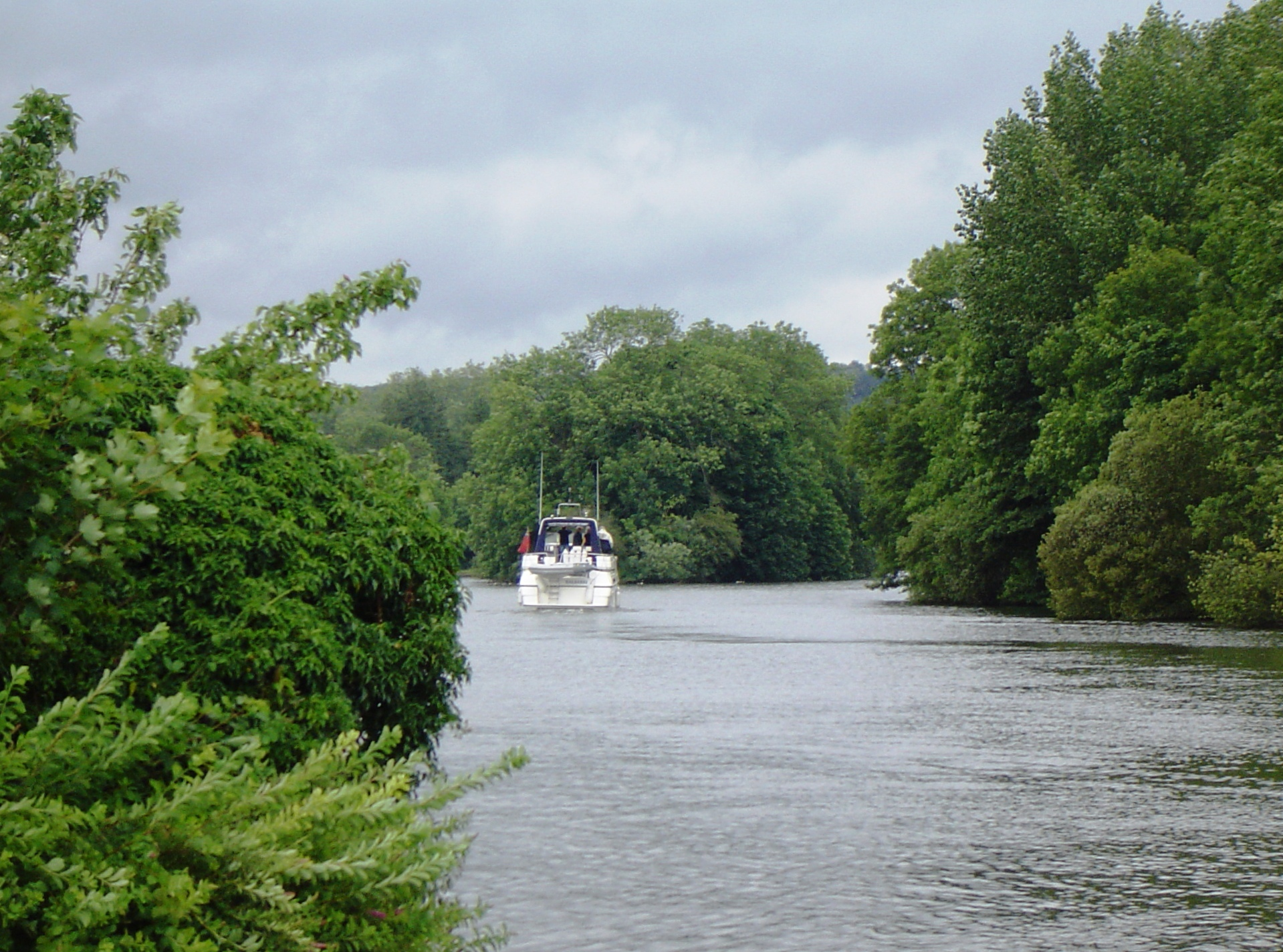
Handbuck Eyot from the Shiplake bank

Handbuck Eyot or Handbuck Ait is a thin, wooded island in the River Thames in England towards the eastern edge of the villages of Shiplake, Oxfordshire. It is on the reach above Marsh Lock.

== Description ==
The island is wooded and only accessible by boat.

It has been included in the property of five to seven detached houses against the river in Bolney Road, Shiplake which it faces.

== See also ==
- Islands in the River Thames

Next island upstream	River Thames	Next island downstream
Unnamed Eyot	Handbuck Eyot	Poplar Eyot
