= View of a House and its Estate in Belsize, Middlesex =

Painting by Jan Siberechts

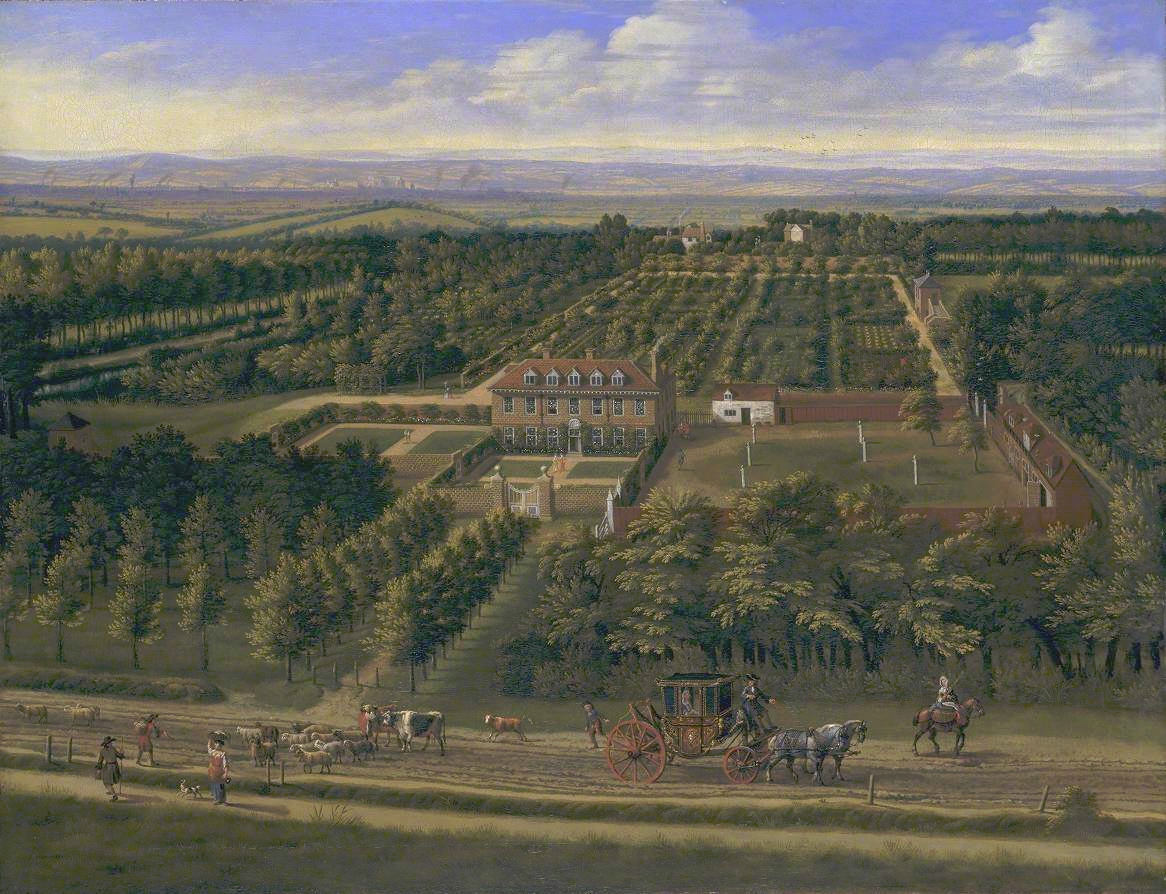
- Artist: Jan Siberechts
- Year: 1696
- Type: Oil on canvas, landscape painting
- Dimensions: 139.7 cm × 107.9 cm (55.0 in × 42.5 in)
- Location: Tate Britain; London

View of a House and its Estate in Belsize, Middlesex is a 1696 panoramic landscape painting by the Flemish artist Jan Siberechts. It depicts a view of what is now Belsize Park in London, but was then rural Middlesex. The city can be seen in the distance, represented by the smoke from many chimneys and the outlines of Westminster Abbey. It was once mistaken for a view of Francis Pemberton's house at The Grove in Highgate but later came to be correctly identified as one that stood on Rosslyn Hill on the uphill approach to Hampstead not far from Pond Street. It should not be confused with another property Belsize House that also stood in the area. Today it is in the collection of the Tate Britain in Pimlico, having been acquired with assistance from the Art Fund in 1995.

== Bibliography ==
- Galinou, Mireille. City Merchants and the Arts, 1670-1720. Oblong for the Corporation of London, 2004.
- Hackney, Stephen, Jones, Rica & Townsend, Joyce (ed.) Paint and Purpose: A Study of Technique in British Art. Harry N. Abrams, 1999.
