= Henley from the Wargrave Road =

Painting by Jan Siberechts

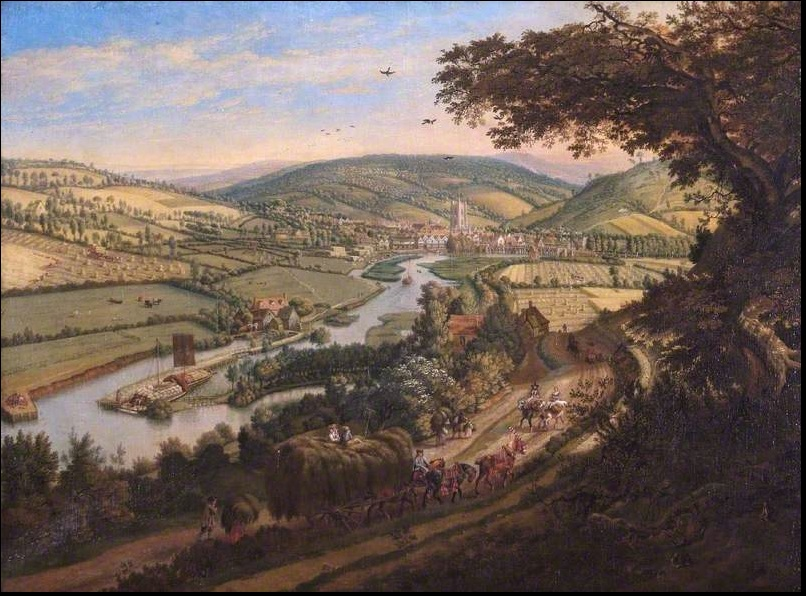
- Artist: Jan Siberechts
- Year: 1698
- Medium: Oil on canvas
- Subject: Landscape
- Dimensions: 90.2 cm × 120.6 cm (35.5 in × 47.25 in)
- Location: River & Rowing Museum, Henley-on-Thames, Oxfordshire
- 51.53243°N 0.89651°W
- Owner: River & Rowing Museum
- Accession: 2001.293
- Website: collection.rrm.co.uk

Henley from the Wargrave Road (aka Henley-on-Thames from the Wargrave Road, Oxfordshire) is an oil painting, painted in 1698 by the Flemish artist Jan Siberechts (1627–c. 1703).

== History and description ==
The painting is housed in its own room off the Henley Gallery at the River & Rowing Museum in Henley-on-Thames, Oxfordshire, England. It displays the town and the surrounding countryside on the River Thames. It is one of a series of English landscape paintings by Siberechts. The painting is a record of social history, showing the river trade, agriculture, and social hierarchy, alongside a still familiar view of the town. It includes the River Thames and the historic flash lock at Marsh Lock, near Marsh Mills in the foreground. In the distance is the town of Henley-on-Thames, with the old wooden bridge and church tower. Agricultural workers can be seen in the fields. A laden haycart is depicted on the road in the foreground, heading towards Henley.

Henley from the Wargrave Road was purchased with the assistance of the National Art Collections Fund and the Heritage Lottery Fund.

== See also ==
- Landscape with Rainbow, Henley-on-Thames, also by Siberechts (c.1690)
