= Unnamed Eyot =

Island in the River Thames, England

Coordinates: 51°30′21″N 0°52′13″W

Ferry eyot is an island in the River Thames in Berkshire, England, north of the village of Wargrave, Berkshire, its parish in civil terms and ecclesiastical parish in the Church of England. It is on the reach above Marsh Lock.

The 2.378-acre (0.962 ha) low-lying narrow island, wooded and about 200m long, has a tennis court and internally a large fish pond which reduces its area but was excavated between 1907 and 2000 to help build up its level, being next to a broad area equipped with designated flood-meadows known as Wargrave Marsh. Immediately above it is where the river is joined by the Loddon draining an area larger than central Berkshire. Immediately below and on the banks on this reach the keeping of extensive centuries-established flood meadows, once used more widely for pasture than today – more are used as gardens today in Berkshire than as farmland – means the extra flows are evened out so as not to cause flash flooding to Henley and all towns below. It is separated by a thin navigable channel used for mooring against the east (Wargrave) bank, and accessible by a footbridge, being part of the grounds of a private house. The ait is the largest example which is part of one owner's garden below Oxford. The Ordnance Survey shows no name for the island. The island is named Ferry Eyot in Chris Cove-Smith's book for river users.

== See also ==
- Islands in the River Thames

Next island upstream	River Thames	Next island downstream
Phillimore Island	Unnamed Eyot	Handbuck Eyot
