= Poplar Eyot =

Coordinates: 51.5182°N 0.8791°W

Poplar Eyot or Poplar Ait is an island in the River Thames in England near the villages of Shiplake, Oxfordshire and Wargrave, Berkshire. It is on the reach above Marsh Lock.

The island is wooded and only accessible by boat. It has immediately downstream much less pronounced and smaller wooded islets, which are submerged when the river is in spate after major rainfall or snow melt across the catchment; they lie below the grounds of buildings Bolney Court and Thames Side Court which have formal geometric landscaped gardens on the Shiplake bank, and it has always been part of the parish since its medieval founding; though is slightly closer to the Wargrave bank.

== See also ==
- Islands in the River Thames

Next island upstream	River Thames	Next island downstream
Handbuck Eyot	Poplar Eyot	Ferry Eyot
