= Nick Schlee =

English painter

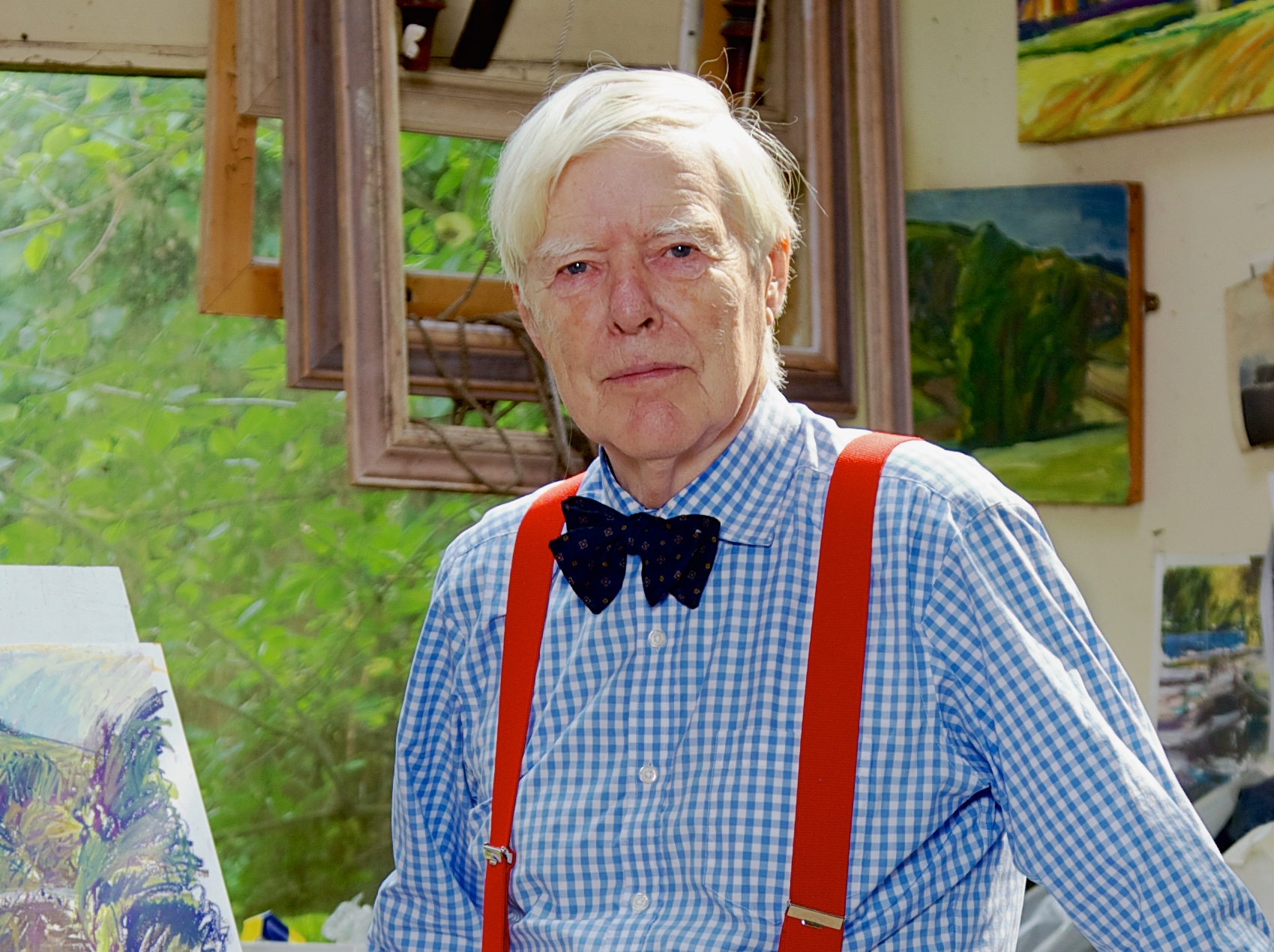
- Schlee in his studio in 2012
- Born: 1931 (age 94–95); Weybridge, Surrey, England
- Education: University College, Oxford; Art Students League, New York; Central School of Art and Design, London; Morley College, London; Putney Art School, London; Slade School of Fine Art, London
- Known for: Landscape painting

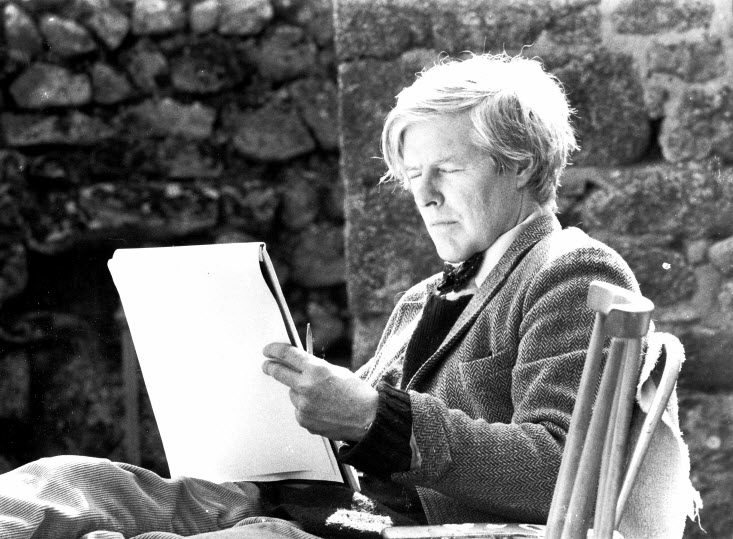

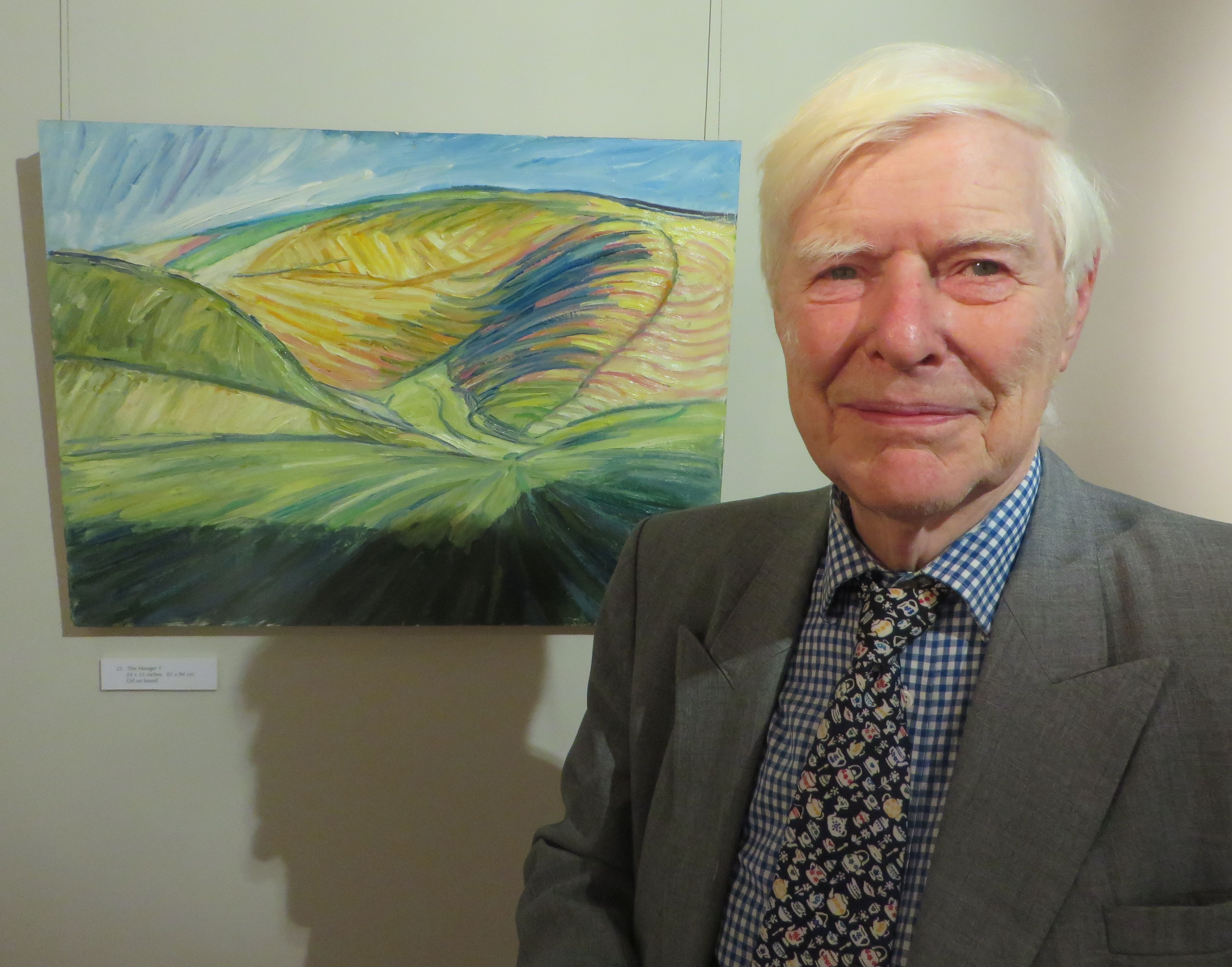
Schlee at Gallery 8 in London, 2015

Nick Schlee (born 1931) is a British artist. He mainly produces landscape paintings.

== Life and work ==
Schlee was born in Weybridge, Surrey. In 1947, he won Gold and Silver medals for under 18s from the Royal Drawing Society. He matriculated at University College, Oxford in 1952. In 1955, he studied part-time at the Art Students League in New York, United States. The following year he again studied part-time at the Central School of Art and Design, Morley College, Putney Art School, and the Slade School of Fine Art in London. In 1989, he exhibited at the Royal Academy in London. He has painted a number of works featuring the River Thames. His work is of "forceful landscapes defined with positive brushstrokes." He produces short books on his artworks.

Since 1989, Nick Schlee has lived and worked in Upper Basildon, Berkshire. He was married to the writer Ann Schlee, who died 2023 and has four children.

== Exhibitions ==
Nick Schlee has produced many one-man exhibitions in England:

- 1987 Yehudi Menuhin School, Sussex
- 1988 The Grange, Rottingdean
- 1990 Wantage Museum, Oxfordshire
- 1991 Century Galleries, Henley-on-Thames
- 1992 Flying Colours Gallery, Edinburgh
- 1993 Castlegate House Gallery, Cumbria
- 1994 Barbican Centre, London
- 1995 Wantage Museum, Oxfordshire
- 1996 Simon Carter Gallery, Suffolk
- 1996 University of Liverpool
- 1996 Christ Church Picture Gallery, Oxford
- 1998 Gallery 27, London
- 2000 Gallery 27, London
- 2001 Corn Exchange, Newbury
- 2002 Gallery 27, London
- 2002 River & Rowing Museum, Henley-on-Thames
- 2003 Christ Church Picture Gallery, Oxford
- 2004 Modern Artists Gallery, Whitchurch on ThamesOxfordshire
- 2004 Gallery 27, London
- 2006 Oxford Said Business School
- 2006 Corn Exchange, Newbury
- 2006 Gallery 27, London
- 2006 West Berkshire Museum
- 2006 Gallery 27, London
- 2008 Gallery 27, London
- 2010 River & Rowing Museum, Henley-on-Thames
- 2012 Modern Artists Gallery, Whitchurch on Thames, Oxfordshire
- 2013 St Barbe Museum & Art Gallery (exhibition produced by the Southampton City Art Gallery)
- 2014 Gallery 8, London
- 2015 54 The Gallery, London
- 2015 Gallery 8, London
- 2016 Modern Artists Gallery, Oxfordshire
- 2017 Arlington Arts Centre, Newbury
- 2017 Oxfordshire County Museum, Woodstock
- 2018 Gallery 8, London (Abstractions)
- 2018 Christ Church Picture Gallery, Oxford
- 2020 Gallery 8, London (Venice Observed)
- 2024 River & Rowing Museum, Henley-on-Thames
- 2025 Gallery 8, London (Brighton to Oxford)

== Collections ==
Schlee's work is held by the City of London Guildhall Art Gallery, Gallery Oldham, Hampshire County Council, John Creasey Museum (Salisbury), University of Liverpool, National Trust, Oxfordshire Museums, University of Portsmouth, Reading Museum & Art Gallery, River & Rowing Museum, Southampton City Art Gallery, Swindon Art Gallery, The Wessex Collection (Longleat), West Berkshire Museum, and Wiltshire Heritage Museum.
