= Ratzeburg Test =

Fitness test for competitive rowing

The Ratzeburg Test was a test used to gauge the suitability of individuals for international competitive junior rowing prior to the use of indoor rowing machines for selection. The test was originally developed by the "Academy of Ratzeburg rowing", Germany in 1971. It was employed by the Great Britain Junior rowing team selectors in the late 1970s and early 1980s.

== Elements of the Test ==
Each element of the test was supervised by one of the GB junior rowing selection team. All parts of the test were completed in succession during an afternoon. The sequence was a timed 3,000 metre run on an athletic track, then a weight lifting test, followed by a gym circuit test.

The weight lifting test consisted of successive power clean lifts at increasing weight until failure. At a given weight, recorded in pounds, a maximum of 3 failures were allowed.

The circuit test counted the number of repetitions performed in one minute for each of the following exercises:

- Number of Squat Thrusts.
- Number of Sit ups with 20 lbs on chest.
- Number of Squat jumps of 1 foot over maximum vertical reach.
- Number of Sit ups with 20 lbs on chest (again).
- Number of Squats with 20 lbs.
- Number of Power Cleans of 90 lbs.

If any repetition did not meet the standard required it would not be included in the circuit repetitions count.

== Ratzeburg Test Index Calculation ==
The subject's height was measured in centimetres from the floor up to the clavicle (just below the neck) and the subjects weight in kilograms.

Participants were required to score a minimum index value of 20.0 in order to pass to the next stage in the selection process.

Each element of the test had a specific “constant value”. Each empirical value of an element taken for a subject had the respective constant value subtracted to emphasize better scores.

- Subject_Height_Constant = 125
- Subject_Weight_Constant = 50
- Power_Clean_Constant = 25
- Circuit_Reps_Constant = 50
- Run_Time_Constant = 450

The calculation was performed as follows:

Ratzburg Test Index Value =

( (Subject_Height_Value – Subject_Height_Constant) x

(Subject_Weight_Value – Subject_Weight_Constant) x

(Power_Clean_Value – Power_Clean_Contant) x

(Circuit_Reps_Value – Circuit_Reps_Constant) )

Divided by

( Run_Time_Value – Run_Time_Constant) x 1,000

== Critique ==
The test penalised lightweight rowers who would provide a lower weight value into the calculation. This encouraged participants to attempt to increase body weight during the winter season, only losing the weight again after the testing period had completed.

It did however allow those who were physically appropriate for international rowing to be recognised, and created a focus on all round physical fitness in the winter training period rather than only specific rowing fitness.
