= Ann Schlee =

English novelist (1934–2023)

Ann Schlee FRSL
- Born: 26 May 1934; Greenwich, Connecticut, U.S.
- Died: 1 November 2023 (aged 89)
- Education: Somerville College, Oxford
- Notable awards: Guardian Children's Fiction Prize (1979)
- Spouse: Nick Schlee
- Children: 4

Ann Schlee FRSL (26 May 1934 – 1 November 2023) was an English novelist. She won the annual Guardian Children's Fiction Prize for The Vandal (1979), a book award judged by a panel of British children's writers. She was elected Fellow of the Royal Society of Literature in 1997.

== Personal life and education ==
As a child, Schlee was born in Greenwich, Connecticut and brought up in the United States by her mother and grandparents until the end of the Second World War. Afterward, she settled in Cairo, Egypt with her parents. They later moved to Sudan and Eritrea. Later, she attended boarding school in England and studied at Somerville College, Oxford.

Schlee was married to artist Nick Schlee. They couple lived in Berkshire and had four children. She died on 1 November 2023, at the age of 89.

== Career ==
Schlee spent much of her writing career in London being quite active in the 1970s to the 1990s.

== Awards and honours ==
The Vandal (Macmillan, 1980) is a science fiction novel set in the future. Beside winning the 1980 Guardian Prize it was a commended runner up for the Carnegie Medal from the Library Association, recognising the year's best children's book by a British subject. (Note: Today there are usually eight books on the Carnegie shortlist. According to CCSU, some runners up through 2002 were Commended (from 1955) or Highly Commended (from 1966); the Highly Commended distinction became approximately annual in 1979. There were about 160 commendations of both kinds in 48 years including Schlee and two others (one highly commended) in 1979.)

Rhine Journey (Henry Holt & Co, 1981, ISBN 978-0-03-056894-7) was shortlisted for the 1981 Booker Prize, recognising the year's best novel.

== Selected works ==
Schlee has written a number of books including:

- The Strangers (1971)
- The Consul's Daughter (1972)
- Guns of Darkness (1973)
- Ask Me No Questions (1979)
- The Vandal (Macmillan, 1980)
- Rhine Journey (Henry Holt & Co, 1981)
- The Proprietor (1983)
- Laing (1987)
- The Proprietor (1996)
- The Time in Aderra (Macmillan, 1998)
