= Ferry Eyot =

Island in the River Thames, England

Coordinates: 51.5209°N 0.8790°W

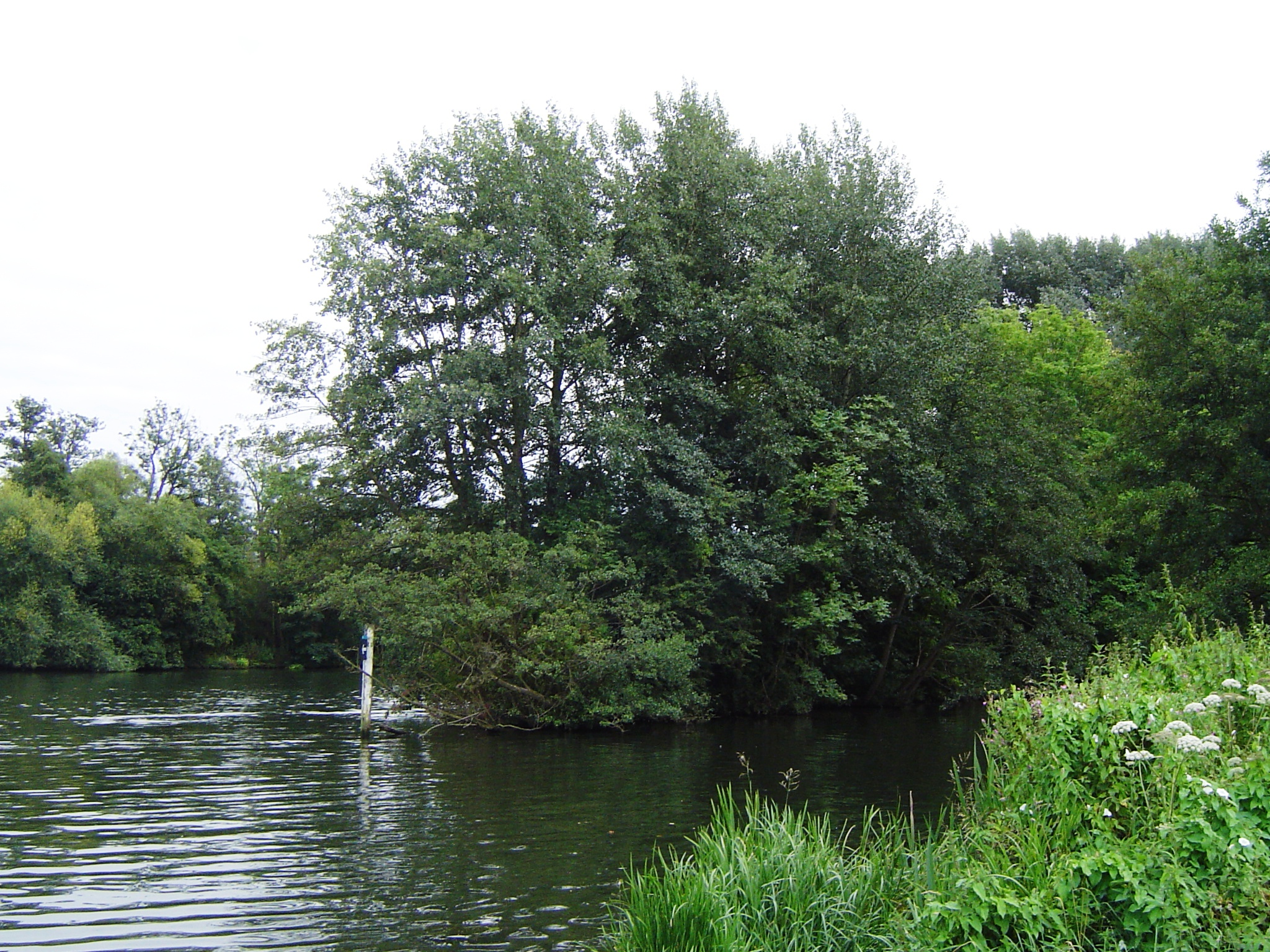
Ferry Eyot from the Shiplake bank

Ferry Eyot or Ferry Ait is an island in the River Thames in England near the villages of Shiplake, Oxfordshire and Wargrave, Berkshire. It is on the reach above Marsh Lock.

The island is named after Bolney Ferry which operated across the river at this point carrying barge horses across to the towpath on the opposite side. This was recorded as being a rope ferry in 1775, and the name for this spot then was Beggar's Hole (or Hall) - deriving from one of the seven halls of Harpsden House which was demolished at the end of the eighteenth century.

== See also ==
- Islands in the River Thames

Next island upstream	River Thames	Next island downstream
Poplar Eyot	Ferry Eyot	Rod Eyot
