= River and Rowing Museum =

Former local museum in Henley-on-Thames, England

River & Rowing Museum
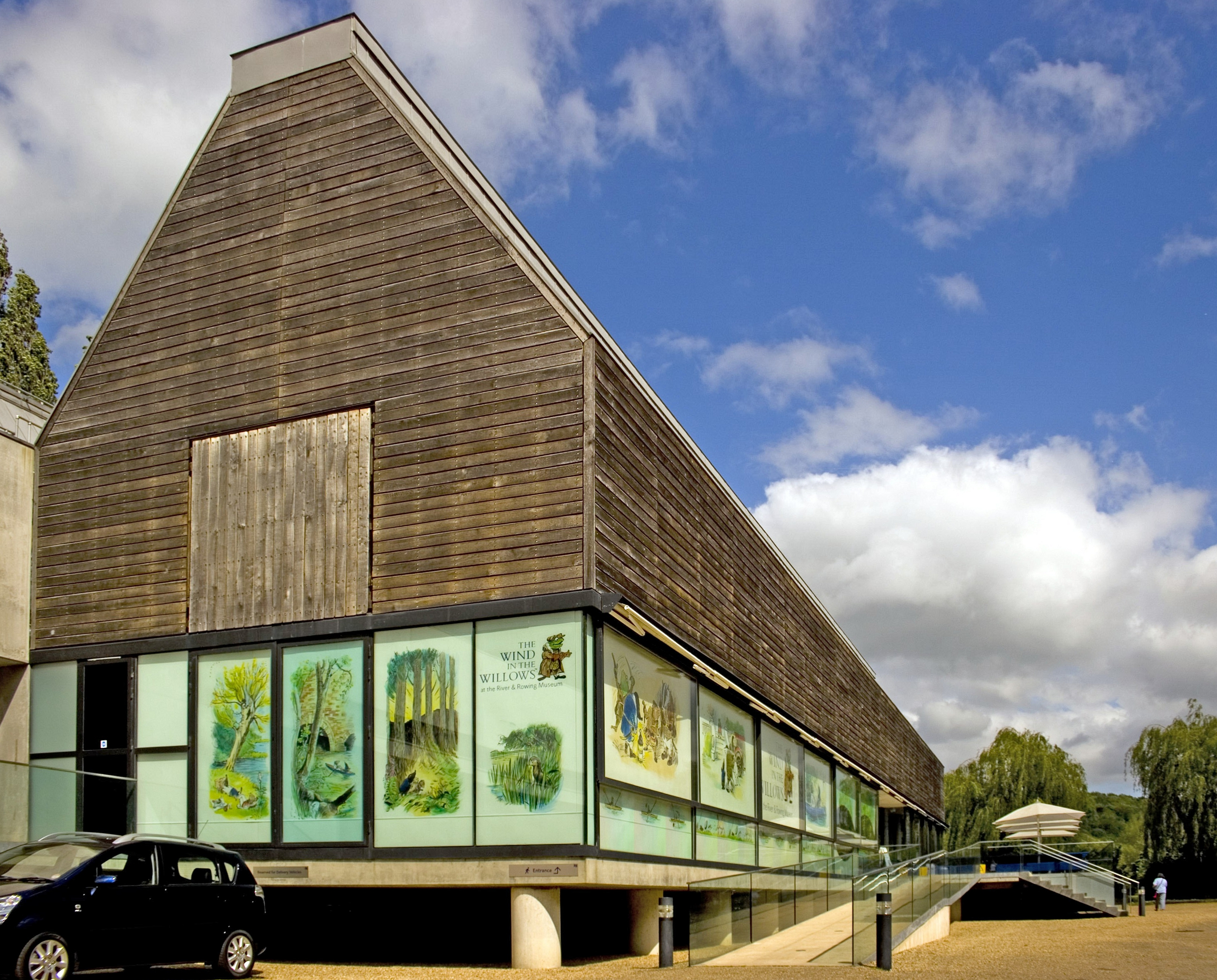
- View of the museum from the car park
- Established: 1998
- Dissolved: 21 September 2025
- Location: Mill Meadows, Henley-on-Thames, England
- Coordinates: 51.5322°N 0.8961°W
- Type: Local and sports museum
- Collections: Rowing, River Thames, Henley-on-Thames
- Founder: David Lunn-Rockliffe
- Architect: Sir David Chipperfield
- Historian: Chris Dodd
- Parking: Own car park
- Website: www.rrm.co.uk

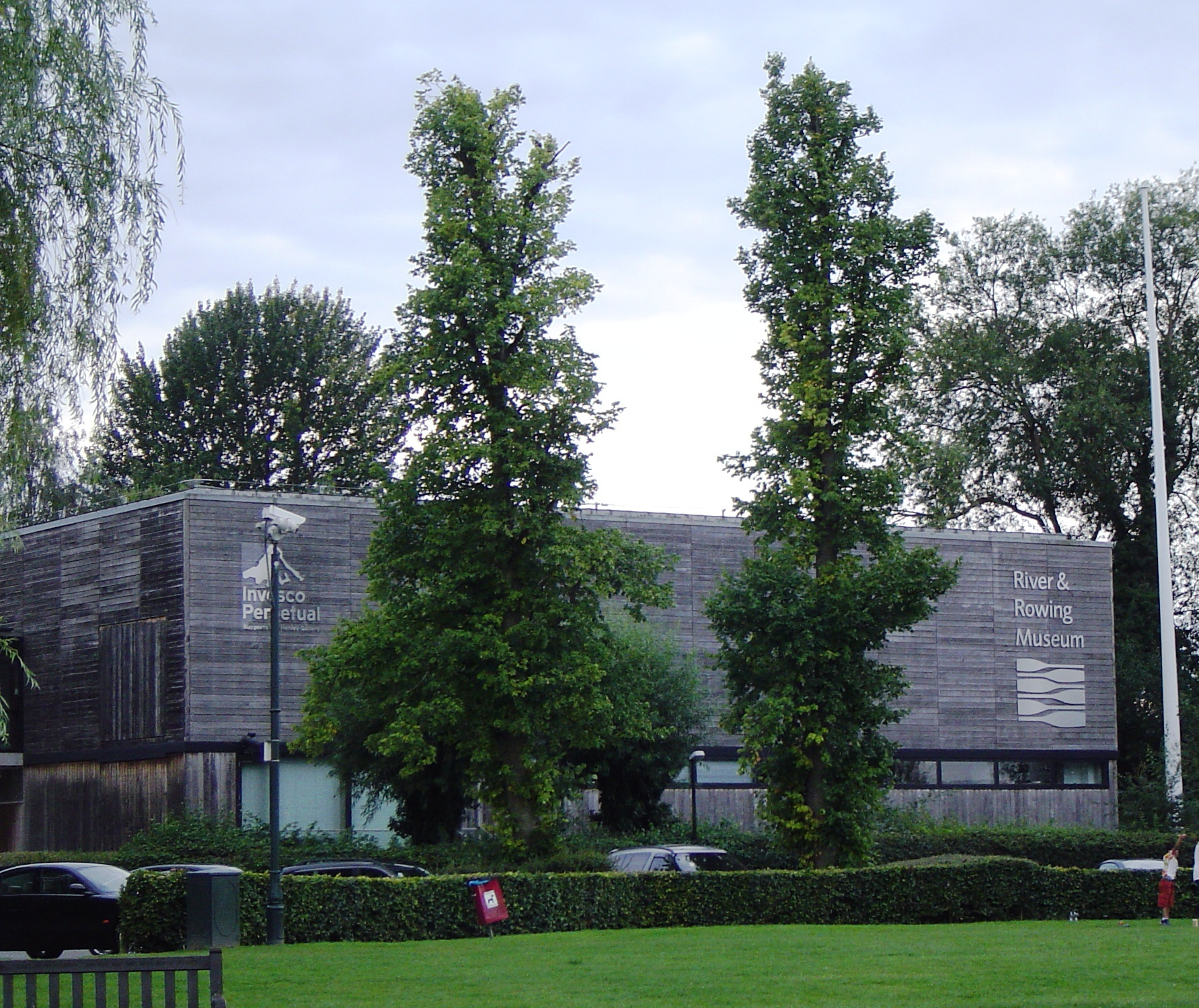
View of the museum from the River Thames

The River & Rowing Museum in Henley-on-Thames, Oxfordshire, England, was on a site at Mill Meadows by the River Thames. It had three main themes represented by major permanent galleries, the non-tidal River Thames, the international sport of rowing and the local town of Henley-on-Thames. The building is now up for sale.

== History ==
The impetus for the museum largely came from David Lunn-Rockliffe, formerly Executive Secretary of the Amateur Rowing Association. The building was designed by the modernist architect Sir David Chipperfield and has won awards for the building itself, including the Royal Fine Art Commission Building of the Year award in 1999. It was also UK National Heritage Museum of the Year in 1999.

The museum was one of the first to have a website, which existed before the building opened. It was officially opened in November 1998 by Queen Elizabeth II. Major benefactors include The Arbib Foundation run by local businessmen Sir Martyn Arbib and Urs Schwarzenbach. There was a 1998 opening exhibition of Julian Trevelyan 'River Thames' etchings.

In 2004, a The Wind in the Willows attraction for families was installed. This is a walk-through recreation using models, sets and an audio-guide of all the E.H. Shepard illustrations from the 1908 Kenneth Grahame book.

In 2006, the museum completed an extensive refurbishment of its Rowing Gallery, thanks to a major donation by Urs Schwarzenbach. Now known as the Schwarzenbach International Rowing Gallery, it told the story of rowing from its beginnings in ancient Greece to the modern Olympics. Thematically arranged, the gallery included sections devoted to the Oxford v. Cambridge Boat Race, World & Olympic rowing, professional rowing in the 19th and early 20th centuries, boat building, coaching, and nutrition. The museum later displayed a unique collection of video clips. A feature in the Schwarzenbach International Rowing Gallery was an interactive exhibit In the Cox's Seat that allowed visitors to sit in a rowing boat and experience a race at Henley Royal Regatta.

Temporary exhibitions included work by the Thames-based painter Chris Gollon, the local 20th-century artist John Piper: 'The Master of Diversity in Association with Bohun Gallery and the Michael Gyselynck John Piper Collection, one of his collaborators, the potter Geoffrey Eastop, the local painter Nick Schlee, and the local furniture maker Philip Koomen. In 2006, there was an exhibition by John Piper's grandson, Luke Piper. Between November 2006 and February 2007, there was an exhibition of the illustrations of E.H. Shepard called The Man who Drew Pooh & Toad.

On 27 February, 2025, the trustees of the museum announced that the museum was to cease operations and close, due to financial pressures. The museum closed on 21 September 2025. In March 2026 the Twentieth Century Society applied for the building to be listed.

== Themes ==
The Museum included four themes explored through a wide variety of exhibitions and events across four galleries and special exhibitions:

- The past, present, and future of the River Thames
- The historic riverside community of Henley on Thames
- The international sport of rowing
- The Wind in the Willows

== Galleries ==
=== The Wind in the Willows Gallery ===
The permanent The Wind in the Willows exhibition included Mr Toad, Ratty, Badger, and Mole to a location on the bank of the River Thames, whose creatures and landscapes provided the inspiration behind the original book.

E.H. Shepard's illustrations were included as 3-D models that depict the adventures of Mr Toad, Ratty, and their friends. The Museum has rights to use the original images by Shepard, who explored the meadows and willow-fringed river around nearby Pangbourne in search of settings for these illustrations. The exhibition followed the original storyline, using theatrical lighting and sound techniques to take visitors on a journey through the world of The Wind in the Willows. Interactive exhibits and specially developed audio guides helped visitors feel a part of the story.

=== Thames Gallery ===
The Thames Gallery was the largest of the River & Rowing Museum's permanent galleries. It provided an interpretation of the River Thames from source to sea. The River Thames is a key element of life in the Thames Valley and the country as a whole. The gallery offered visitors a range of perspectives, looking at the river as an inspiration for the arts, as a natural habitat for wildlife and as both a source of pleasure and a means of trade. In a mix of music, art, photography, original objects, boats and oral testimony the gallery took the visitor on a journey from the source at Kemble to the Thames Barrier. Exhibits from local and private collections illustrated the historic and social importance of the river, while interactive displays enabled visitors to learn more about river management and water supply.

Aspects of the Thames in the exhibition included:

- Travel from the hidden source to the sea
- Thames paintings in the gallery and on terminals
- The wildlife and the bugs that make their home in and alongside the river
- Music, poetry and literature inspired by the Thames, from Conrad to The Kinks
- The craftsmanship of boat builders from log boats to skiffs and punts
- How the Thames has been managed throughout the ages
- The importance of weirs, locks and bridges and meet some of their custodians
- Stories told by members of riverside communities

=== Schwarzenbach International Rowing Gallery ===
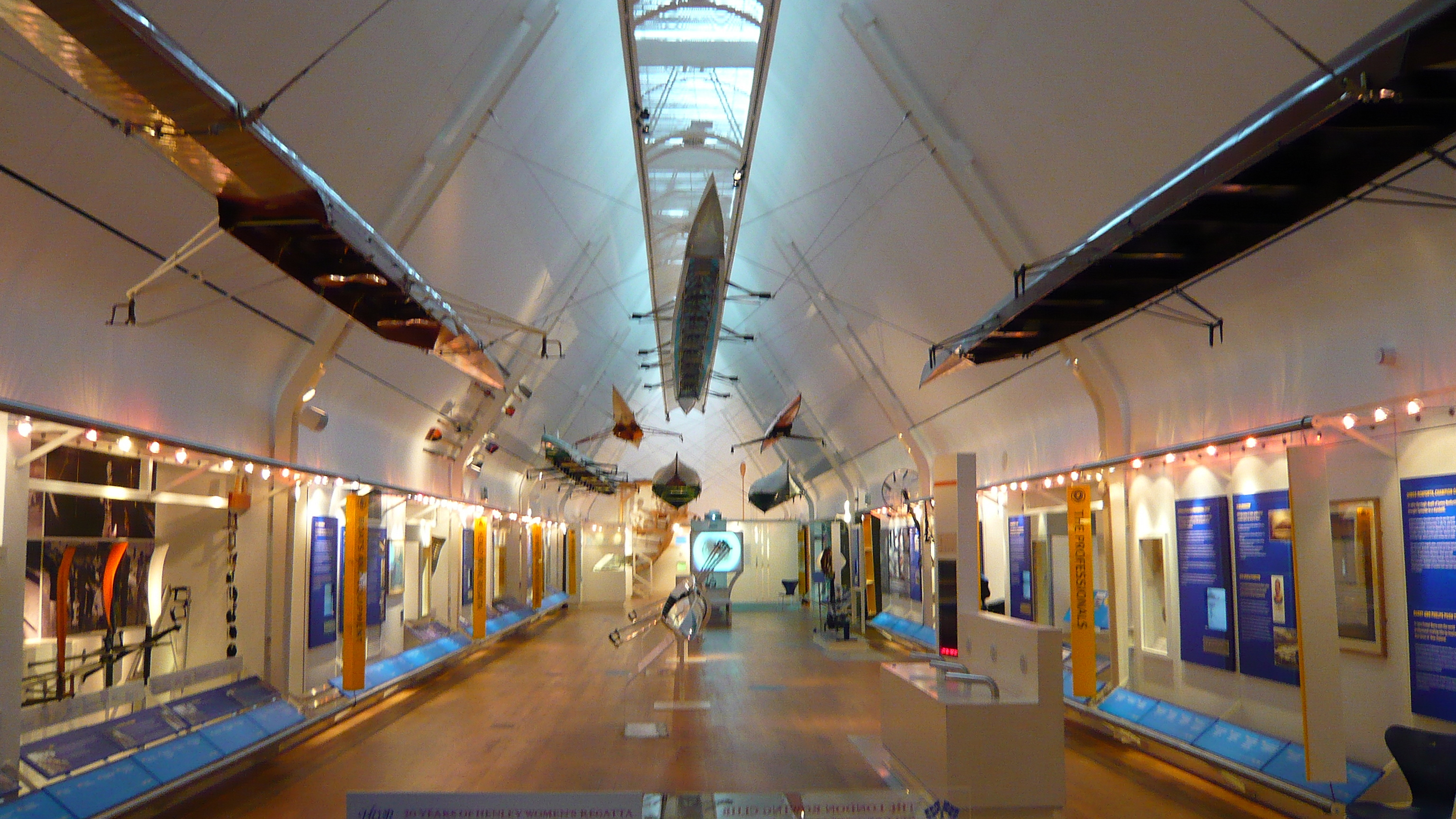
The interior of the museum, showing multiple rowing boats

There was a contemporary painting by the entrance, Gollon At Henley, painted by Chris Gollon and commissioned by the River & Rowing Museum in 2008. The image shows a defeated crew at Henley Royal Regatta. Inside the gallery, the story of international rowing was presented, allowing the visitor to experience the sport and understand what it is like to compete on the water.

Rowing is one of the world's oldest sports and the gallery tells its story in detail. On display were many objects no previously shown in public, film footage showing races, and a range of interactive exhibits of general interest. Sections included exhibits on the following:

- Six communities who relied on the oar for their livelihood
- A race at the Henley Royal Regatta in 360° panoramic vision
- Rowing across the world, and throughout the centuries
- Races at the Olympics, Boat Race, etc.
- Professional rowers, sports stars of their day
- Coaches and boat builders whose work has allowed champions to flourish
- Racing craft spanning 200 years of design and innovation

=== The Henley Gallery ===
The Henley Gallery told the story of the town of Henley-on-Thames, built by the river. The history presented covered industry, arts, the Civil War, sports, etc. An interactive touch-screen allowed visitors to take a virtual tour around the streets of Henley, travel back through time to when the town was established, see how it has changed over time, and how it became famous for rowing.

The Museum acquired an Iron Age coin hoard in 2009. It is made up of 32 gold coins dating from approximately 50 AD. It was found in Henley in 2003 and is the only hoard of British-made Iron Age coins from Oxfordshire to have survived intact. They have been acquired jointly by the River & Rowing Museum and the Ashmolean Museum in Oxford.

Henley was established in the 12th century when its location by the river made it convenient as an inland port for shipping timber, grain, and firewood to the rapidly growing city of London. From this time onwards, the town's fortunes were linked to the river and transport. Boats, stagecoaches, railway engines, and motors have, in turn, brought goods and people to the town for business and pleasure.

Henley Royal Regatta has made the town of Henley-on-Thames an international centre of rowing. Established in 1839, and gaining a royal patron in 1851, the Regatta brings together leading international oarsmen and women and is considered to be part of the English social calendar. Town and Regatta celebrations since 1899 are presented on film in the gallery.

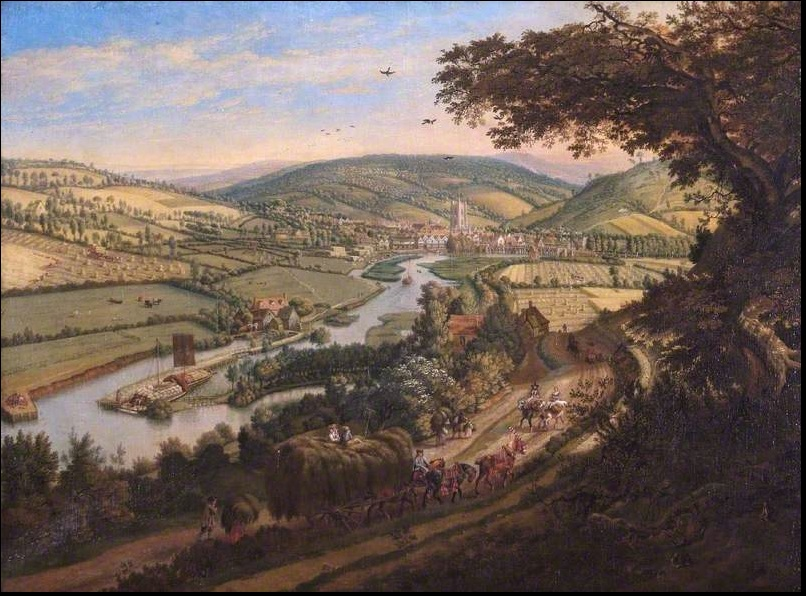
Henley from the Wargrave Road by Jan Siberechts (1698)

Painted in 1698 by the Dutch master Jan Siberechts (1627–c.1703), Henley from the Wargrave Road had its own room off the Henley Gallery. A masterpiece displaying the multifaceted life of the town and surrounding countryside, it is one of a series of English landscapes by Siberechts, The painting is a record of social history, showing the river trade, agriculture, and social hierarchy, alongside a still familiar view of the town. Henley from the Wargrave Road was purchased with the assistance of the National Art Collections Fund and the Heritage Lottery Fund.

=== Special exhibitions ===
The Treasures Gallery, the Sir Graham Kirkham Gallery, and The Wall provided venues for special exhibitions throughout the year. The Museum's exhibition programme was designed around its major themes and includes exhibitions that have a family appeal as well as more specialist exhibitions. Topics ranged from celebrations of major events and anniversaries to arts, crafts, and sculpture, or in-depth investigations.

== Collections ==
The museum had a collection of nearly 20,000 objects, including 5,000 photographs, 650 trophies and medals, and 400 posters. The collection also included artworks, some especially commissioned, such as Chris Gollon's 2001 acrylic painting Big Fish Eat Little Fish, acquired by the museum with the support of the Victoria and Albert Museum.

== A scaled down River and Rowing Museum ==
The award-winning building is up for sale. A scaled down museum is included in The River Centre bid. The bid allocates the former Wind and the Willows Gallery for museum use.
