= Jan Siberechts =

Flemish painter

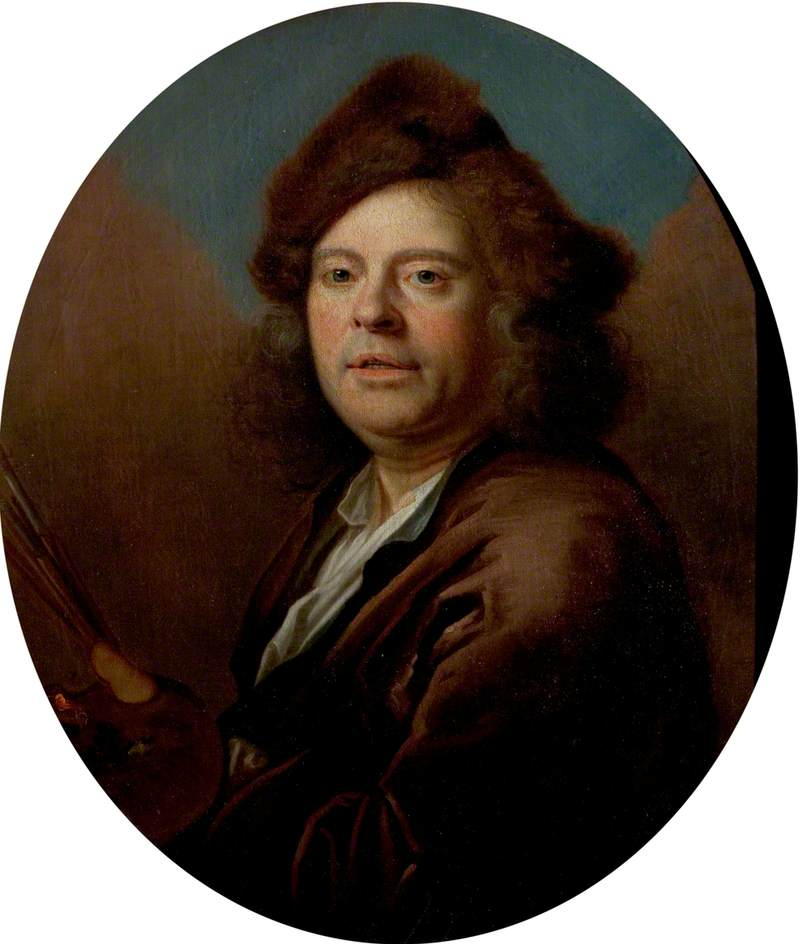
Portrait of Jan Siberechts by Nicolas de Largillière

Jan Siberechts (1627–1703) was a Flemish landscape painter who, after a successful career in Antwerp, emigrated in the latter part of his life to England. In his early works, he developed a personal style of landscape painting, with an emphasis on the Flemish countryside and country life. His later landscapes painted in England retained their Flemish character by representing a universal theme. Siberechts also painted hunting scenes for his English patrons. The topographical views he created in England stand at the beginning of the English landscape tradition.

== Life ==
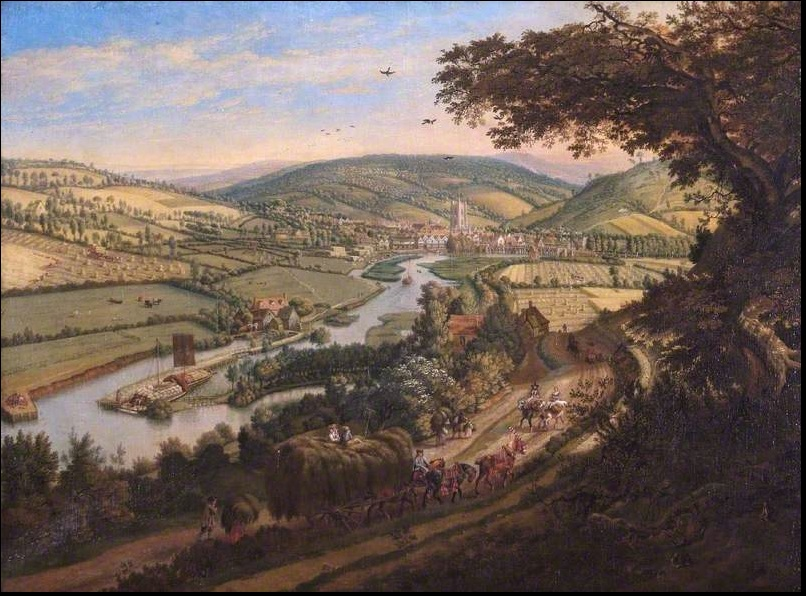
Henley-on-Thames from the Wargrave Road, Oxfordshire (1698)

Jan Siberechts was born in Antwerp, the son of a sculptor with the same name. He trained in Antwerp with his father and became a master in the local Guild of Saint Luke by 1648. It is possible but not certain that in the late 1640s, early 1650s he visited Italy. He married Maria-Anna Croes in Antwerp in 1652. He developed a personal style of painting landscapes, which impressed George Villiers, 2nd Duke of Buckingham when he visited Antwerp in 1670. The Duke invited the artist to England.

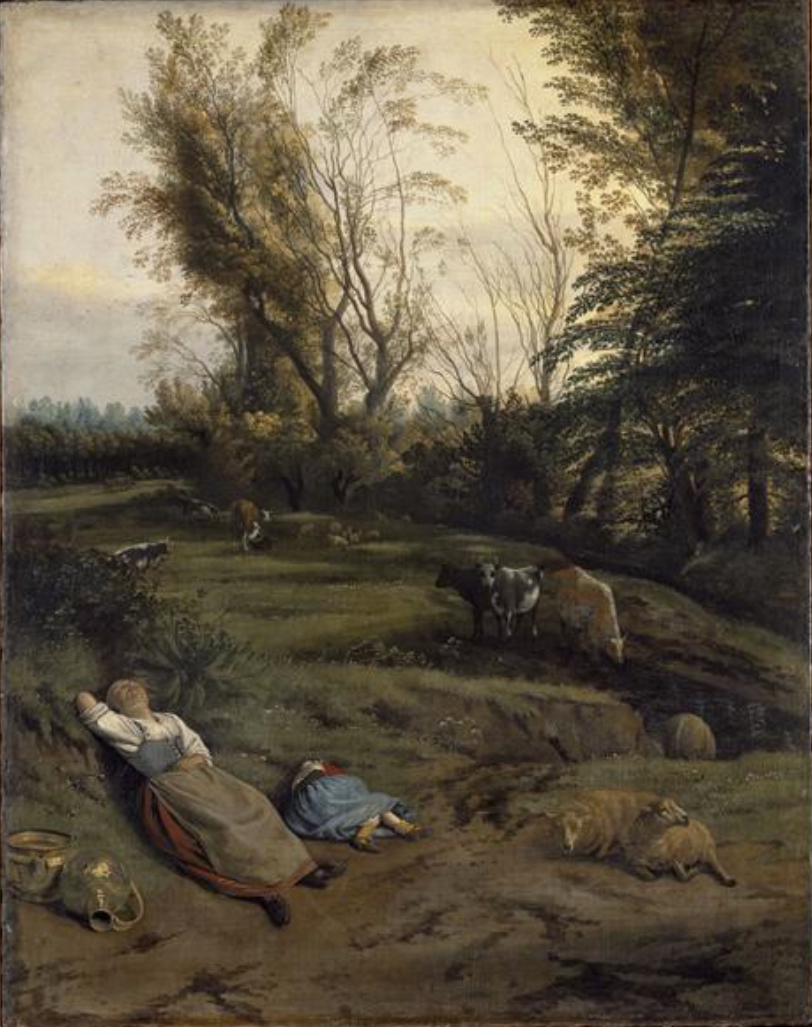
Pasture with sleeping shepherdesses

Siberechts arrived in England around 1672 and spent the first three years in England painting decorations in the Duke's newly built Cliveden House at Taplow, Buckinghamshire, England. From the second part of the 1670s and in the 1680s, he travelled widely in England, completing numerous commissions for aristocratic clients. He lived in London, where one of his daughters was a lace-maker for the Queen. His younger daughter, Frances, married the Flemish émigré sculptor Artus Quellinus III (known in England as 'Arnold Quellinus') and, after being widowed, John Nost, another Flemish émigré sculptor. Whilst in London he was commissioned to paint the Belsize Estate of goldsmith banker John Coggs in 1696, which now hangs in the Tate Gallery London.

He died in London.

John Wootton was one of his pupils.

== Work ==
About 100 of his works have been preserved. His early works were indebted to Dutch Italianate landscape painters such as Nicolaes Berchem and Karel Dujardin. Siberechts must have become acquainted with their work in Antwerp as these artists were mainly active in Rome and Siberechts possibly did not visit Italy himself although such a visit in the late 1640s, early 1650s cannot be excluded.

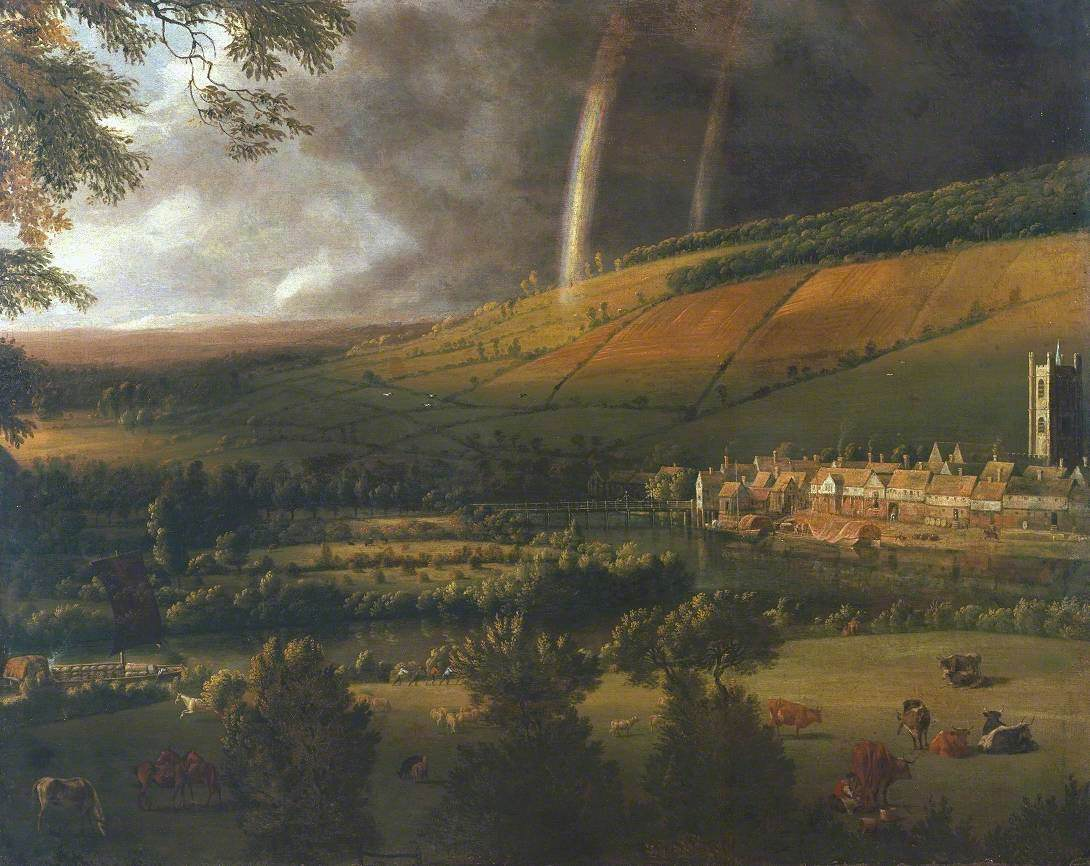
Landscape with Rainbow, Henley-on-Thames, c.1690

In the 1660s, he developed a very personal style of landscape painting, with an emphasis on the Flemish countryside and country life. He introduced into the foreground of his landscapes figures of robust country girls, dressed in bright red, blue, and yellow. These countrywomen are shown traveling in carts, on foot, and on the backs of mules and in the act of carrying objects, bundles, or baskets, or crossing flooded roads or fords. The volumetric modeling and the manner in which they are set against brightly lit areas of the countryside make the figures stand out from the picture. The artist used the figures to play with the visual effects produced by the figures in the water. He occasionally also painted farmyard scenes in the vein of David Teniers the Younger such as the Courtyard of a vegetable farm (dated 1664, Royal Museums of Fine Arts of Belgium).

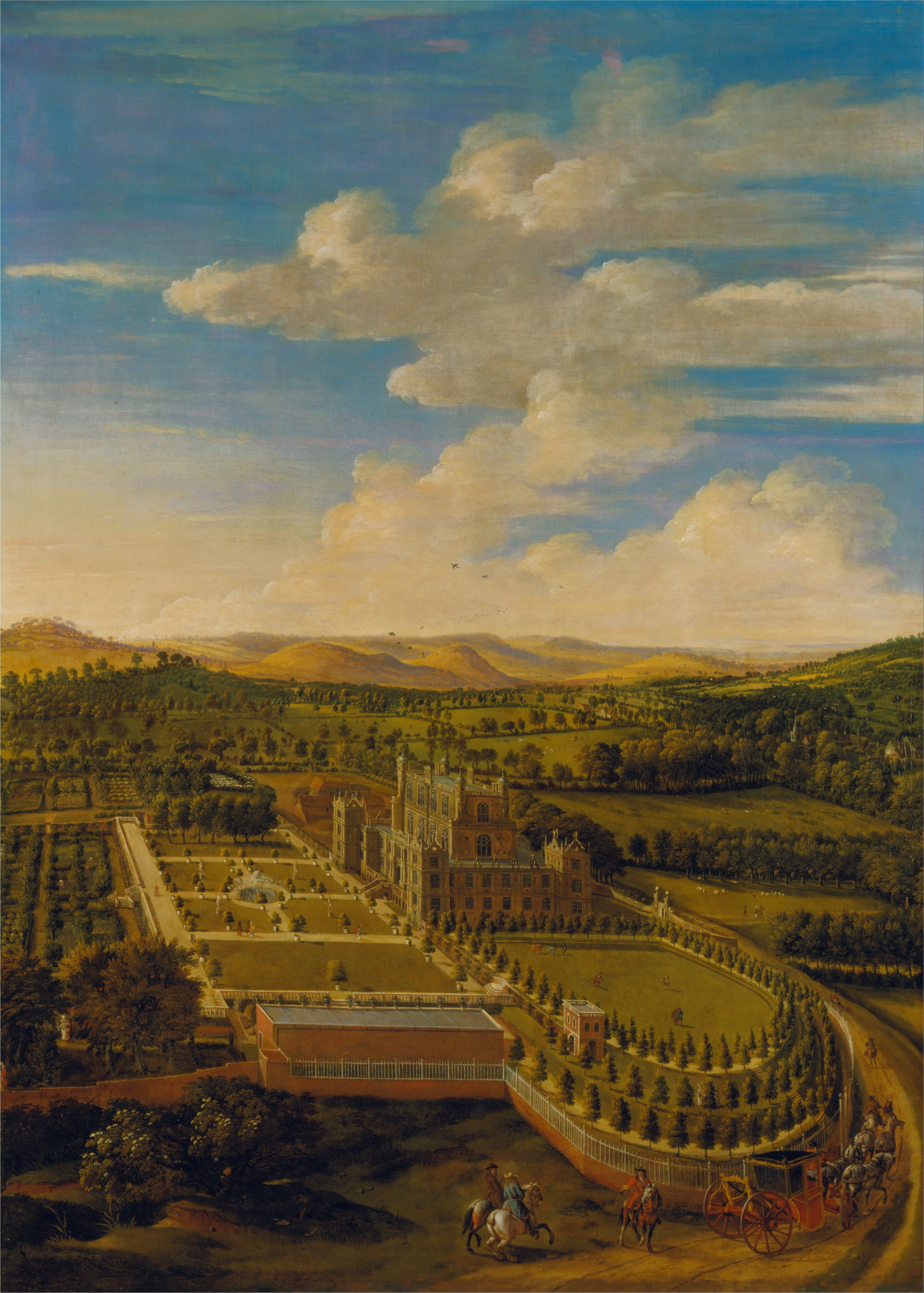
Wollaton Hall and Park, Nottinghamshire

His later landscapes, painted in England in the 1670s and 1680s, retained their Flemish character by representing a universal theme. This stands in contrast to Dutch landscape paintings of the period, which typically concentrated on a single aspect of a landscape. Siberechts' landscapes depicted powerful trees and soft light on distant hills, while the figures became less important than the landscape itself. The foreground was kept relatively dark in order to draw attention to the broad, brightly lit vista in the background.

Siberechts also painted hunting scenes for his English patrons. These are the earliest country house portraits in England. He used a fairly standardised composition for these hunting scenes: the hunting scene with the huntsmen and horsemen in the foreground and a naturalistic view of the stately home as the backdrop, placed in a misty and atmospheric landscape. He adopted a bird's-eye view that allowed a maximum amount of detail to be depicted.

These country house portraits had an important influence on English landscape painting, and Siberechts can be regarded as the 'father of British landscape'. These landscapes also have an important historical and topographical interest. Siberechts stood at the beginning of a long tradition of Flemish painters who made topographical paintings of the estates of the British nobility. These artists include Peter Tillemans, Pieter Andreas Rijsbrack, and Hendrik Frans de Cort.

== Gallery ==
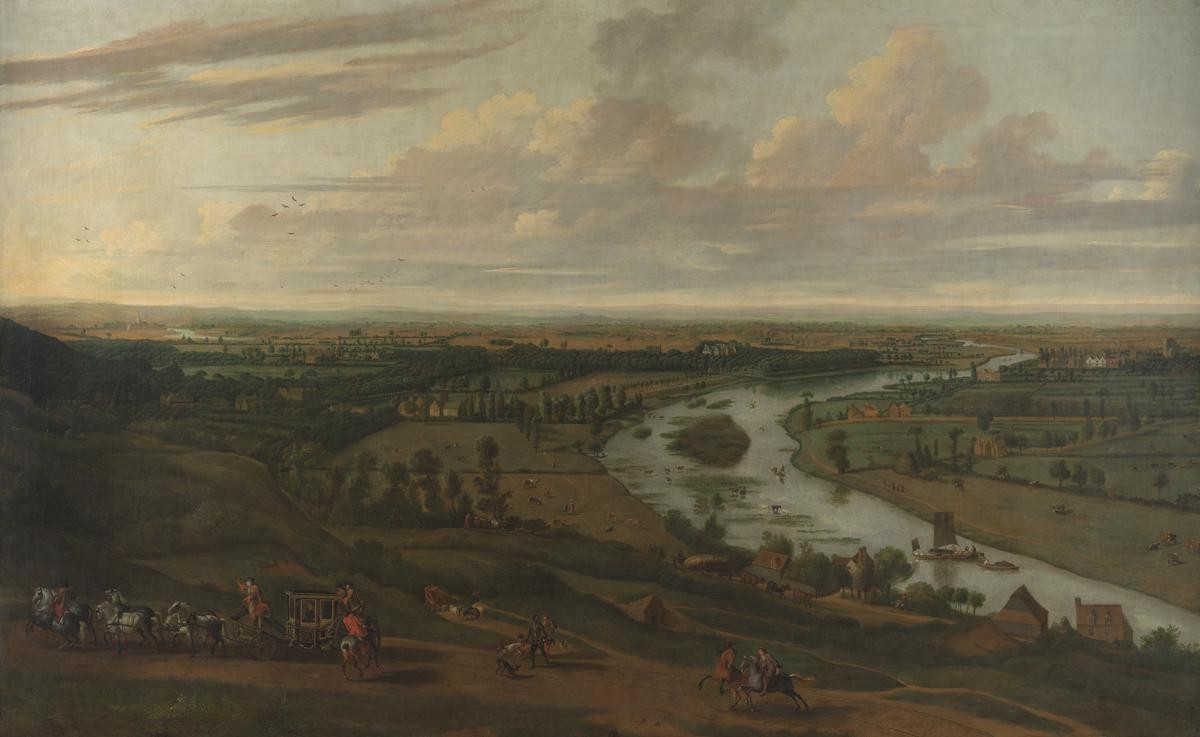
A View from Richmond Hill, 1677

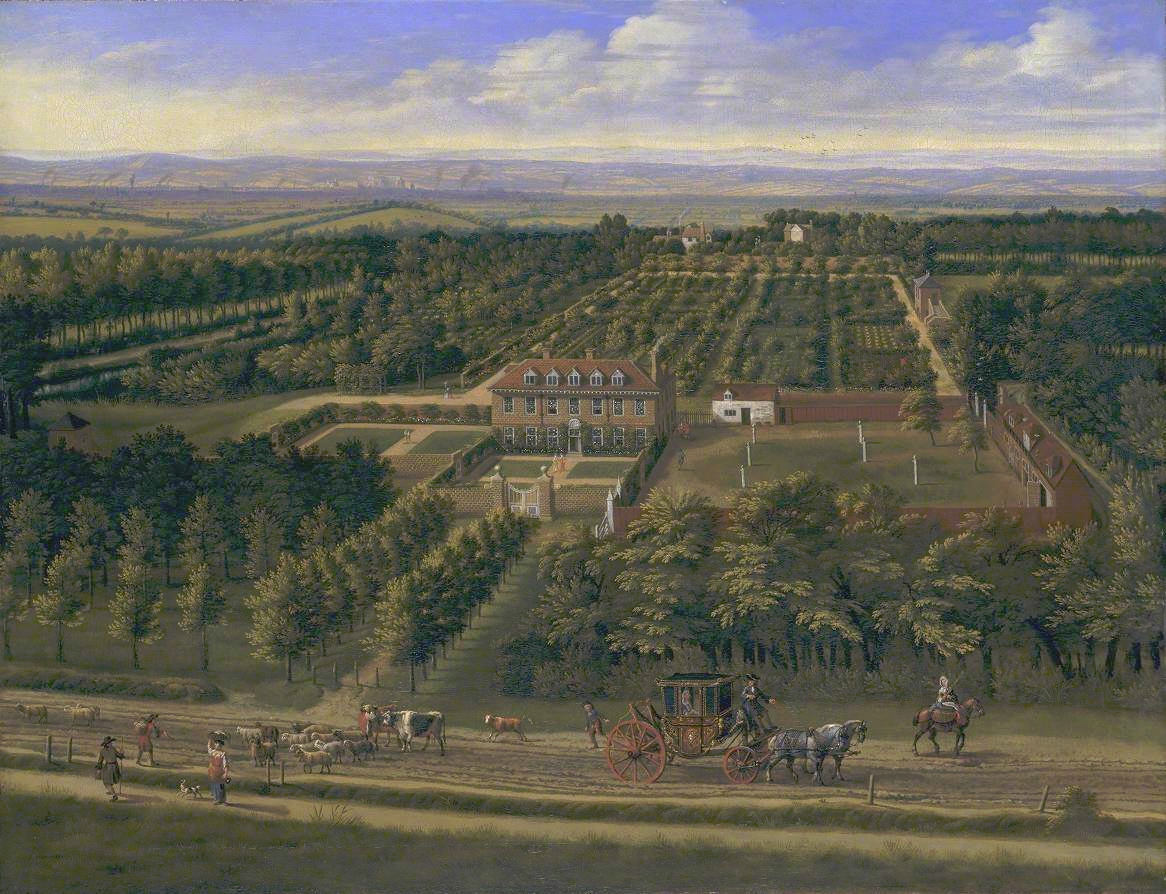
View of a House and its Estate in Belsize, Middlesex, 1696
