= The Boat Race 1967 =

113th Boat Race
- Date: 25 March 1967
- Winner: Oxford
- Margin of victory: 3 1/4 lengths
- Winning time: 18 minutes 52 seconds
- Overall record (Cambridge–Oxford): 61–51
- Umpire: G. D. Clapperton (Oxford)

Other races
- Reserve winner: Goldie
- Women's winner: Cambridge

The 113th Boat Race took place on 25 March 1967. Held annually, the event is a side-by-side rowing race between crews from the Universities of Oxford and Cambridge along the River Thames. The race was won by Oxford by three-and-a-quarter-lengths. Goldie won the reserve race while Cambridge won the Women's Boat Race.

== Background ==
The Boat Race is a side-by-side rowing competition between the University of Oxford (sometimes referred to as the "Dark Blues") and the University of Cambridge (sometimes referred to as the "Light Blues"). The race was first held in 1829, and since 1845 has taken place on the 4.2-mile (6.8 km) Championship Course on the River Thames in southwest London. The rivalry is a major point of honour between the two universities, followed throughout the United Kingdom and broadcast worldwide. Oxford went into the race as reigning champions, having won the previous year's race by 3 3/4 lengths. Cambridge, however, held the overall lead with 61 victories to Oxford's 50 (excluding the "dead heat" of 1877).

The first Women's Boat Race took place in 1927, but did not become an annual fixture until the 1960s. Until 2014, the contest was conducted as part of the Henley Boat Races, but as of the 2015 race, it is held on the River Thames, on the same day as the men's main and reserve races. The reserve race, contested between Oxford's Isis boat and Cambridge's Goldie boat has been held since 1965. It usually takes place on the Tideway, prior to the main Boat Race.

The race was umpired by George Douglas "Jock" Clapperton who had coxed Oxford in the 1923 and 1924 races as well as umpiring in the 1959 boat race.

Cambridge's coaching team included Norman Addison (rowed for Cambridge in the 1939 race), James Crowden (1951 and 1952 races), David Jennens (1949, 1950 and 1951 races), Mike Muir-Smith (1964 race), Mike Nicholson (non-rowing boat club president for the 1947 race), J. R. Owen (1959 and 1960 races) and M. Wolfson while Oxford's comprised Hugh "Jumbo" Edwards (rowed for Oxford in the 1926 and 1930 races) and Ronnie Howard (1957 and 1959 races).

== Crews ==
The Cambridge crew weighed an average of 13 st 11 lb (87.3 kg), 1.75 pounds (0.8 kg) per rower more than their opponents. Oxford's crew containing three former Blues in Martin Kennard, Chris Freeman and Jock Mullard, while Cambridge saw bow-man Lindsay Henderson and Patrick Delafield return. Oxford's American number four, Josh Jensen, was the heaviest oarsman in the history of the race at 15 st 4 lb (96.8 kg). The former Cambridge Blue Donald Legget, writing in The Observer, suggested that the Light Blue crew was "possibly their fastest ever", but nevertheless predicted a two-length victory for Oxford.

| Seat | Oxford | | | Cambridge | | |
| Seat | Name | College | Weight | Name | College | Weight |
|---|---|---|---|---|---|---|
| Bow | J. R. Bockstoce (P) | St Edmund Hall | 14 st 0 lb | L. M. Henderson (P) | Selwyn | 13 st 5 lb |
| 2 | M. S. Kennard | St Edmund Hall | 13 st 0 lb | C. D. C. Challis | Selwyn | 13 st 6 lb |
| 3 | C. H. Freeman | Keble | 14 st 0 lb | R. D. Yarrow | Lady Margaret Boat Club | 13 st 9 lb |
| 4 | J. E. Jensen | New College | 15 st 4 lb | G. C. M. Leggett | St Catharine's | 13 st 3 lb |
| 5 | J. K. Mullard | Keble | 14 st 0 lb | P. G. R. Delafield | Jesus | 14 st 9 lb |
| 6 | C. I. Blackwall | Keble | 13 st 6 lb | N. J. Hornsby | Trinity Hall | 14 st 9 lb |
| 7 | D. Topolski | New College | 11 st 13 lb | D. F. Earl | Lady Margaret Boat Club | 13 st 11 lb |
| Stroke | P. G. Saltmarsh | Keble | 14 st 0 lb | R. N. Winckless | Fitzwilliam | 13 st 9 lb |
| Cox | P. D. Miller | St Catherine's | 9 st 6 lb | W. R. Lawes | Pembroke | 8 st 13 lb |
Source: (P) – Boat club president

== Race ==
The Championship Course along which the Boat Race is contested

Oxford won the toss for the third successive year and elected to start from the Surrey station, handing the Middlesex side of the river to Cambridge. The race commenced at 1.17 p.m. Despite the conditions favouring the Light Blues, Oxford were ahead from the start and led by two seconds the Mile Post in a record-equalling time of 3 minutes 47 seconds. According to Legget, Cambridge "were untidy and rather rushed". Near Harrods Furniture Depository, the crews nearly clashed oars, but Oxford held firm and reached Hammersmith Bridge with a three-second lead. Rounding the corner, Cambridge chose to stay on the tide, while Oxford headed for shelter towards the Surrey shore. The Light Blues reduced the lead marginally but by Chiswick Steps, Oxford were six seconds ahead and moved back to the Middlesex shore, with Cambridge resolute in midstream. Oxford briefly left the shelter of the shoreline to shoot Barnes Bridge through the centre arch, before heading back, with a lead of eight seconds. Despite pushing their rating to 36 strokes per minute, Cambridge could not reduce the deficit, and as Oxford accelerated to a rating of 38, they passed the finishing post 3 1/2 lengths ahead, in a time of 18 minutes 52 seconds. It was the first time in 54 years that Oxford had won three consecutive Boat Races. Upon the conclusion of the race, the Oxford boat club president Mullard hailed his coaches from the boat: "Thanks Ronnie, thanks Jumbo".

In the reserve race, Cambridge's Goldie beat Oxford's Isis by two lengths and five seconds, their inaugural victory on the third running of the contest, in a time of 19 minutes 11 seconds. In the 22nd running of the Women's Boat Race, Cambridge triumphed, their fifth consecutive victory.
