= Trinity College Boat Club =

British rowing club

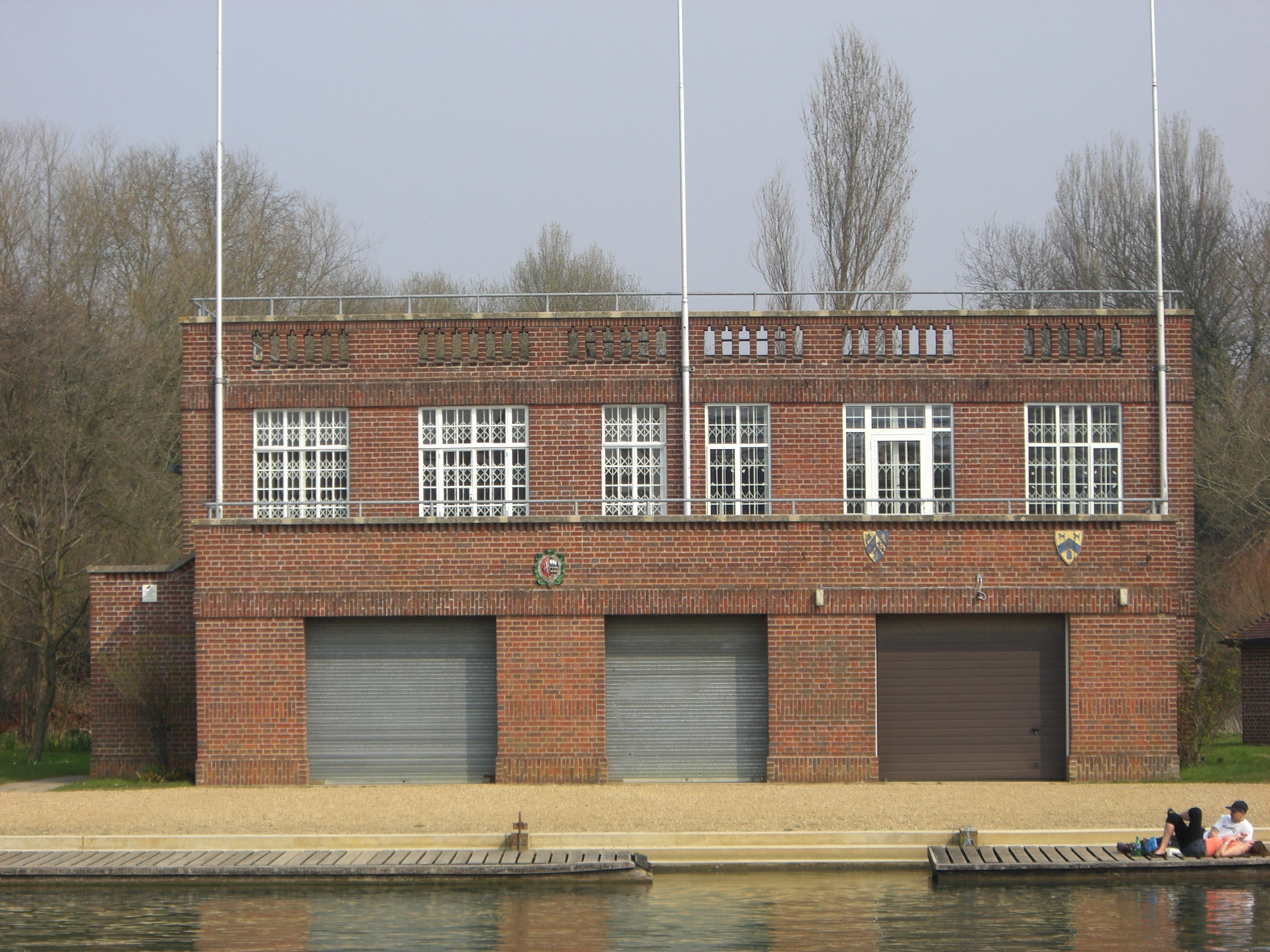

- Trinity College Boathouse (right) and rowing blade colours
- Coordinates: 51.7426°N 1.2486°W
- Home water: The Isis
- Founded: c. 1837
- Key people: Ivan Tolkachev (President); Christopher Ferguson (Senior Member)
- Head of the River: Men: 1861-64, 1938, 1939, 1946-49
- University: University of Oxford
- Colours
- Affiliations: British Rowing (boat code TRO); Churchill College, Cambridge (Sister college)
- Website: TCBC Website

Trinity College Boat Club (TCBC) is the rowing club of Trinity College, Oxford in Oxford, United Kingdom. The club's members are students and staff from Trinity College and, occasionally, associate members from other colleges.

The boat club is based in its boathouse on the Isis, which is shared with Lady Margaret Hall Boat Club (LMHBC), Linacre College Boat Club and Magdalen College Boat Club.

== History ==
Rowing as an organised inter-collegiate sport became increasingly popular in Oxford during the early decades of the nineteenth century; the first organised bumps races was held at around that time. A Trinity rower in 1831 by the name of James Pycroft detailed how the men in the crew would pay for a college boat themselves, and would levy a rate upon all members of the college to help pay for it, "it being considered that the boat and its anticipated victories were for the honour of the college generally". Even at the outset of rowing at Trinity in the 1830s, Pycroft records in his memoirs an incident in which a scholar named Thomas Lewin "had thoughts of joining the boat, but received a hint that it would not do"; because members of the boat club were known to be uproarious, riotous and generally interested in having a good time while they studied.

In 1838 Trinity join the records, which can still be seen in the college's boathouse, and moved up three places over the week's rowing from eighth to fifth. Trinity's first rowing Blues are both depicted in the earliest known depiction of a Trinity crew, from 1842. John Cox and Edward Breedon both rowed in the sixth boat race on the Westminster to Putney course in 1842.

Another nineteen years passed with rowing at Trinity growing in its importance within the college, until finally during the Eights in 1861, Trinity bumped University College, Brasenose College, Exeter and finally Balliol College to go Head of the River. The run of great rowing continued until 1865, which marked the beginning of a disastrous few years of racing at Trinity. However, the period at the head was matched with a similar stretch of dominance at the top of Division One, just a few months before the start of World War II in 1939. Several of Trinity's former members rowed at that time and experienced being the best of the Oxford college crews on the Isis.

In addition to this, past Trinity crews were involved in many regattas outside of the college, including the Henley Royal Regatta and the Thames Regatta.

== Fleet ==
- c.1990 Janousek 8+ "Richard Hillary"
- 2000 Sims 8+ "Lady Elizabeth"
- 2003 Janousek 4+ "Judith Beloff"
- 2008 Stampfli 4+
- 2008 Stampfli 8+ "Magnificat"
- 2008 Empacher 8+ "Parni"
- 2014 Filippi 8+ "Spirit of Myrtle"
- 2019 Hudson 8+ "De Jagerbomb"

== Honours ==
=== Henley Royal Regatta ===
- Thames Challenge Cup : 1894, 1898
- Visitors' Challenge Cup : 1895, 1897
- Wyfold Challenge Cup : 1896, 1928
- Stewards' Challenge Cup: 1949
- Silver Goblets & Nickalls' Challenge Cup : 1923
- Ladies' Challenge Plate : 1923

=== Summer Eights ===
- Men's Summer Eights Headship: 1861–64, 1938, 1939, 1946–49
- Men's Summer Eights Spoons: 2016

=== Boat Race representatives ===
The following rowers were part of the rowing club at the time of their participation in The Boat Race.

Men's boat race

Year	Name
1842	Edward A. Breedon
1842	John C. Cox
1856	F. W. Elers (cox)
1857	F. W. Elers (cox)
1861	A. R. Poole
1862	A. R. Poole
1864	C. Roberts
1864	J. Parsons
1864	M. Brown
1865	H. Schneider
1865	M. Brown
1866	M. Brown
1879	T. C. Burrowes
1881	A. R. Paterson
1882	A. R. Paterson
1886	L. S. R. Byrne
1890	P. S. Tuckett
1893	H. Legge
1904	T. G. Brocklebank
1907	R. M. Peat

Year	Name
1921	F. B. Lothrop
1924	W. F. Godden
1929	P. D. Barr
1931	W. L. Garstang
1932	C. A. Chadwyck-Healey
1933	M. H. Mosley
1934	A. V. Suitcliffe
1935	A. V. Suitcliffe
1938	Henry Melvin Young
1938	Frank A. L. Waldron
1939	Frank A. L. Waldron
1946	R. M. T. Raikes
1947	T. D. Raikes
1948	Tony Rowe
1948	R. G. B. Faulkner (cox)
1949	Tony Rowe
1949	T. D. Raikes
1949	Christopher Davidge
1950	David Callender
1950	J. E. C. Hinchliffe (cox)

Year	Name
1951	David Callender
1951	Christopher Davidge
1952	Christopher Davidge
1953	J. M. Wilson
1954	J. J. H. Harrison
1955	J. M. Wilson
1956	N. Paine
2009	Alexander Hearne
2011	Constantine Louloudis
2012	Kevin Baum
2013	Constantine Louloudis
2014	Michael di Santo
2014	Constantine Louloudis
2015	Michael di Santo
2015	Constantine Louloudis
2017	Michael di Santo
2019	Charlie Pearson

Women's boat race

Year	Name
2011	Nathaniel Upton (cox)
2012	Charlotte Trigle
2015	Emily Reynolds

=== Other blues ===
Year	Name	Crew	Blue	Result
1977	Mike Ridley	OULRC	Half Blue	Won
1978	John Chadwick	OULRC	Half Blue	Lost
1980	Christian Holland	OURFC	Blue	Won
1982	Finlay Decker	OUWBC	Full Blue	Lost
1984	Joanna Armstrong	Osiris	Half Blue	Won
1987	Rachel Barton	OUWLRC	Half Blue	Lost
1996	Pete Richens	OULRC	Half Blue	Won (Cambridge disqualified)
1996	Nathan Tamblyn	OULRC	Half Blue	Won (Cambridge disqualified)
1998	Claire Booth	OUWLRC	Half Blue	Won by a canvas
1999	Melissa Carson (President)	OUWLRC	Half Blue	Won by 3/4 length
2000	Katie King	Osiris	Half Blue	Lost by 1 3/4 lengths
2001	Katie King	Osiris	Half Blue	Won easily
2002	Katie King	Osiris	Half Blue	Won by 1 1/2 lengths
2002	Charlotte Rooke (Captain)	Osiris	Half Blue	Won by 1 1/2 lengths
2004	Rachel Gray	OUWLRC	Full Blue	Won by 3/4 length
2007	Henry Sheldon	OULRC	Half Blue	Won by 1 length
2008	Henry Sheldon (President)	OULRC	Half Blue	Won by 2 1/2 lengths
2010	Ellen Kempston	OUWBC	Half Blue	Won by 3 1/2 lengths
2013	Katherine Rollins	OUWLRC	Full Blue	Won by 4 3/4 lengths
2014	James Fraser-Mackenzie	Isis	Half Blue	Won by 13 lengths
2016	Henry Smith	OULRC	Half Blue	Lost by verdict of easily
2017	Alexander Miles	OULRC	Half Blue	Lost by 1 3/4 lengths
2017	Henry Smith	OULRC	Half Blue	Lost by 1 3/4 lengths
2018	Luke Robinson	Isis	Half Blue	Lost by 2 1/2 lengths
2019	Henry Smith	OULRC	Full Blue	Won by 2 1/4 lengths
2019	Luke Robinson	Isis	Half Blue	Lost by 1 length
2019	Katherine Ferris	OUWLRC	Full Blue	Won by 2 1/2 lengths
2020	Amanda Thomas	OUWLRC	Full Blue	Lost by 6 lengths
2021	Katherine Ferris	OUWLRC	Full Blue	Lost by 2 1/2 lengths
2021	Luke Robinson	Isis	Half Blue	Lost by 6 lengths
2021	Emma Hewlett	Osiris	Half Blue	Lost by 7 lengths
2021	Benjamin de Jager	OULRC	Full Blue	Won by 1 1/2 lengths

== Presidents ==
Year	Name
1984-85	Jonathan Rose
2011-12	Matt Mair
2012-13	Charles McMillan
2013-14	Jonathan Ranstrand
2014-15	Katherine Wensley
2015-16	Lucy Martin
2016-17	Rob Jones
2017-18	Gemma Francis
2018-19	Ben de Jager
2019-20	Ben de Jager
2020-21	Charlotte Green
2021-22	Kate Adams
2022-23	Rose Faure
2023-24	Harry Walton
2024-25	Joshua Holloway
2025-26	Ivan Tolkachev

== See also ==
- Oxford University Rowing Clubs
