= The Boat Race 1954 =

100th Boat Race
- Date: 3 April 1954
- Winner: Oxford
- Margin of victory: 4 1/2 lengths
- Winning time: 20 minutes 23 seconds
- Overall record (Cambridge–Oxford): 54–45
- Umpire: Kenneth Payne (Cambridge)

The 100th Boat Race took place on 3 April 1954. Held annually, the Boat Race is a side-by-side rowing race between crews from the Universities of Oxford and Cambridge along the River Thames. In a race umpired by former Cambridge rower Kenneth Payne, Oxford won by 4 1/2 lengths in a time of 20 minutes 23 seconds, taking the overall record in the competition to 54–45 in Cambridge's favour.

== Background ==
The Boat Race is a side-by-side rowing competition between the University of Oxford (sometimes referred to as the "Dark Blues") and the University of Cambridge (sometimes referred to as the "Light Blues"). First held in 1829, the race takes place on the 4.2-mile (6.8 km) Championship Course on the River Thames in southwest London. The rivalry is a major point of honour between the two universities; it is followed throughout the United Kingdom and, as of 2014, broadcast worldwide. Cambridge went into the race as reigning champions, having won the 1953 race by eight lengths, and led overall with 54 victories to Oxford's 44 (excluding the "dead heat" of 1877).

Cambridge were coached by N. B. M. Clack (who had rowed in the 1952 race), James Crowden (who had represented Cambridge in the 1951 and 1952 races) and R. H. H. Symonds (who had rowed in the 1931 race). Oxford's coaches were Hugh "Jumbo" Edwards (a Blue in 1926 and 1930), W. J. Llewellyn-Jones, J. H. Page and A. D. Rowe (who had represented Oxford in the 1948 and 1949 races). The race was umpired for the fourth time by the former British Olympian Kenneth Payne, who had rowed for Cambridge in the 1932 and 1934 races.

During the build-up to the race, the rowing correspondent for The Times had suggested that "until three weeks ago a Cambridge victory seemed almost certain" but practice rows had proved disappointing. The Oxford crew had been struck down by influenza in training, and had to reshuffle their order a month before the race. Although the new order "seemed weak", they made better progress in training than Cambridge, yet the Light Blues, who were described as "well drilled" but with "erratic timekeeping" nevertheless remained "precarious favourites".

== Crews ==
The Cambridge crew weighed an average of 12 st 9.5 lb (80.3 kg), 5 pounds (2.3 kg) per rower more than their opponents. The Oxford crew saw two members return to the boat, including the cox W. R. Marsh and their boat club president H. M. C. Quick, who was making his third consecutive appearance. Cambridge's crew contained a single participant with Boat Race experience in their stroke and boat club president J. A. N. Wallis. According to the rowing correspondent for The Times, "perhaps the crews have never been more closely matched". Oxford's crew contained four non-British participants, all of them Australian, in E. V. Vine, J. A. Gobbo, J. G. McLeod and Edward Pain.

Seat	Oxford			Cambridge		
Seat	Name	College	Weight	Name	College	Weight
Bow	R. A. Wheadon	Balliol	11 st 13 lb	J. A. N. Wallis (P)	Lady Margaret Boat Club	12 st 0 lb
2	E. V. Vine	Brasenose	12 st 0 lb	J. C. G. Stancliffe	Pembroke	12 st 3 lb
3	J. A. Gobbo	Magdalen	12 st 9 lb	D. K. Hill	Jesus	12 st 6 lb
4	R. D. T. Raikes	Merton	12 st 6 lb	K. A. Masser	Trinity Hall	14 st 0 lb
5	H. M. C. Quick (P)	Merton	13 st 12 lb	M. G. Baynes	Trinity Hall	13 st 1 lb
6	J. G. McLeod	New College	12 st 1 lb	C. M. Davies	Clare	13 st 13 lb
7	E. O. G. Pain	Lincoln	12 st 0 lb	J. N. Bruce	Clare	12 st 1 lb
Stroke	J. J. H. Harrison	Trinity	11 st 9 lb	M. J. Marshall	Jesus	11 st 10 lb
Cox	W. R. Marsh	University	8 st 12 lb	J. W. Tanburn	Jesus	8 st 9 lb
Source: (P) – boat club president

== Race ==
The Championship Course along which the Boat Race is contested

Oxford won the toss and elected to start from the Surrey station, handing the Middlesex side of the river to Cambridge. In a stiff south-westerly wind, umpire Payne started the race at 12:45 p.m. Oxford made a quick start, and according to the rowing correspondent of The Times "literally leaped away, seemingly to row two strokes almost before Cambridge had begun". By the end of the first minute, the Dark Blues were a few feet ahead but with the bend in the river favouring Cambridge, the crews were level by Craven Steps. Despite a push from Cambridge's stroke M. J. Marshall, the Light Blues could not gain any advantage and both crews passed the Mile Post level.

Although rating slightly lower than their opposition, Oxford made the best of the bend in the river at Harrods Furniture Depository to lead by about a canvas-length by the time they passed below Hammersmith Bridge. A strong headwind faced both crews as they rowed into Chiswick Reach and Cambridge struggled in the rough water in the middle of the river. Oxford, whose cox W. R. Marsh had steered towards the shelter of the Surrey shore, gained a length in half a minute, extending out to almost four lengths by Barnes Bridge. Oxford won by 4 1/2 lengths in a time of 20 minutes 23 seconds, for their second victory in eight years.
