= The Boat Race 1953 =

99th Boat Race
- Date: 28 March 1953
- Winner: Cambridge
- Margin of victory: 8 lengths
- Winning time: 19 minutes 54 seconds
- Overall record (Cambridge–Oxford): 54–44
- Umpire: Gerald Ellison (Oxford)

The 99th Boat Race took place on 28 March 1953. Held annually, the Boat Race is a side-by-side rowing race between crews from the Universities of Oxford and Cambridge along the River Thames. The race, in which the Oxford crew was slightly heavier than their opponents, was umpired by former rower Gerald Ellison. Cambridge won by eight lengths in a time of 19 minutes 54 seconds. It was their sixth win in seven years and took the overall record in the event to 54–44 in their favour.

== Background ==
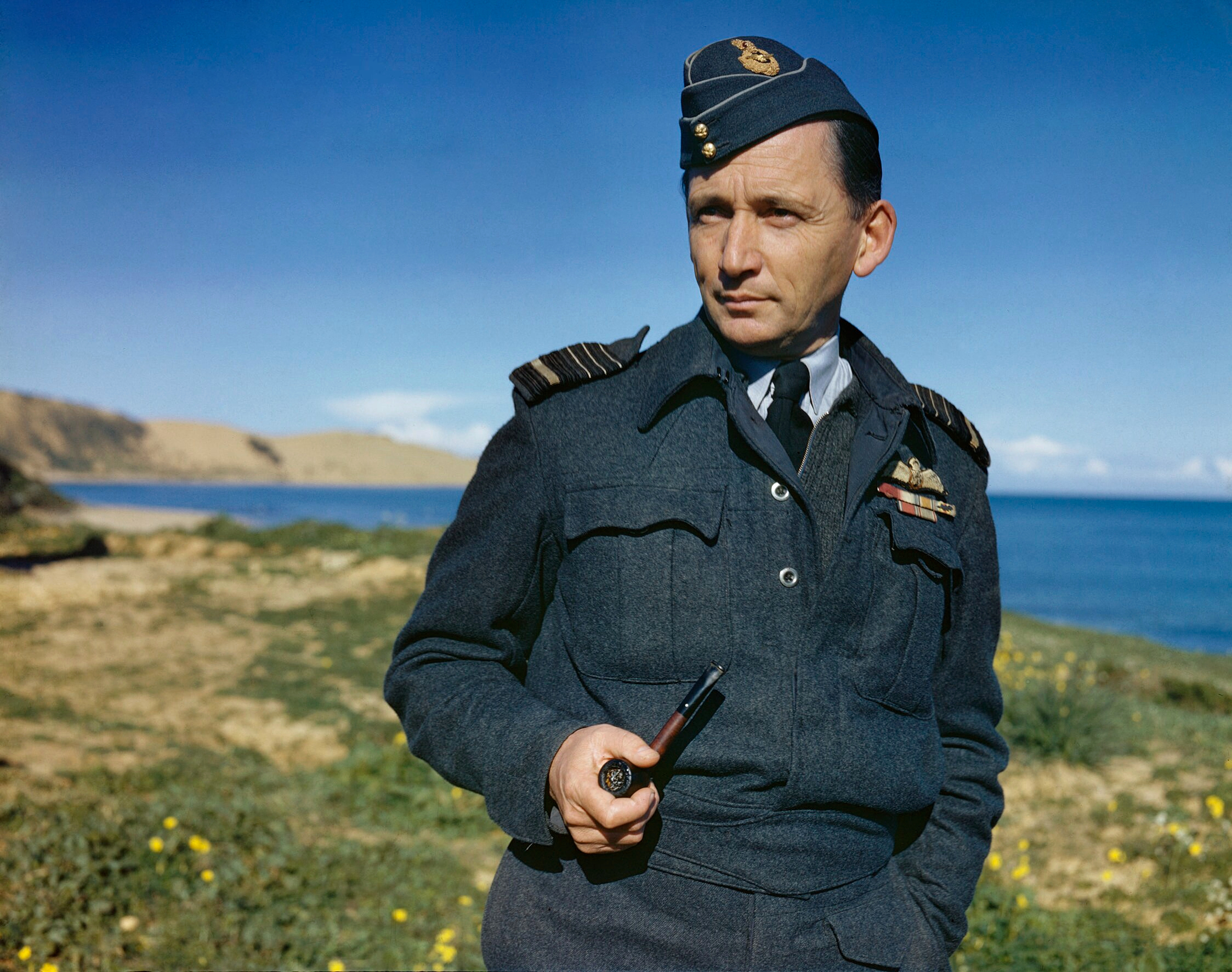
Lord Tedder, the Chancellor of the University of Cambridge, (pictured in 1943) was present on the umpire's launch during the race.

The Boat Race is a side-by-side rowing competition between the University of Oxford (sometimes referred to as the "Dark Blues") and the University of Cambridge (sometimes referred to as the "Light Blues"). First held in 1829, the race takes place on the 4.2-mile (6.8 km) Championship Course on the River Thames in southwest London. The rivalry is a major point of honour between the two universities; it is followed throughout the United Kingdom and, as of 2014, broadcast worldwide. Oxford went into the race as reigning champions, having won the 1952 race by a canvas, with Cambridge leading overall with 53 victories to Oxford's 44 (excluding the "dead heat" of 1877).

Cambridge were coached by James Crowden (who had represented Cambridge in the 1951 and 1952 races), David Jennens (who rowed three times between 1949 and 1951), Roy Meldrum (a coach for Lady Margaret Boat Club) and R. H. H. Symonds (who had rowed in the 1931 race). Oxford's coaches were A. J. M. Durand (who had rowed for the Dark Blues in the 1920 race), Hugh "Jumbo" Edwards (who rowed for Oxford in 1926 and 1930), R. D. Hill (who rowed in the 1940 wartime race) and J. H. Page. The race was umpired for the second time by former Oxford rower and Gerald Ellison, the Bishop of Willesden.

In the build-up to the race, opinions were divided on which crew was favourite to win. According to the rowing correspondent of The Manchester Guardian, upon arrival at Putney, Oxford demonstrated "great superiority" over Cambridge, yet the Light Blues had improved, and had "the pace, if not the form, to win". The Times had declared "Oxford the stronger crew" on the day of the race. Queen Mary had died four days prior to the race; the coxes wore black armbands and the flag post on the umpire's launch was draped in black as marks of respect. The umpire was accompanied on his launch by Lord Tedder, the Chancellor of the University of Cambridge.

== Crews ==
The Oxford crew weighed an average of 12 st 13 lb (81.9 kg), 3 pounds (1.4 kg) per rower more than their opponents. Cambridge saw two rowers return to their crew: J. S. M. Jones at number two and G. T. Marshall at number four. Oxford's crew contained three rowers with Boat Race experience: A. J. Smith, M. L. Thomas and H. M. C. Quick. Two of the participants in the race were registered as non-British: Oxford's Smith was Australian while Cambridge's L. B. McCagg was from the United States. The rowing correspondent for The Times described Oxford's crew as containing "no outstanding individuals" yet "no weak links". Conversely, Cambridge's crew was "variable" in quality but in former Harvard University rower Louis McCagg, they had the "outstanding oarsman in either crew".

Seat	Oxford			Cambridge		
Seat	Name	College	Weight	Name	College	Weight
Bow	R. A. Byatt	New College	12 st 4 lb	J. A. N. Wallis	Lady Margaret Boat Club	11 st 12.5 lb
2	A. J. Smith	Merton	12 st 9 lb	J. S. M. Jones	Lady Margaret Boat Club	12 st 3 lb
3	J. M. Wilson	Trinity	13 st 3 lb	J. R. MacMillan	1st & 3rd Trinity	13 st 0.5 lb
4	E. C. B. Hammond	Brasenose	13 st 2 lb	G. T. Marshall (P)	King's	13 st 5 lb
5	M. L. Thomas (P)	Jesus	13 st 10 lb	D. A. T. Leadley	Emmanuel	13 st 3.5 lb
6	D. T. H. Davenport	University	13 st 1 lb	L. B. McCagg	Emmanuel	13 st 0 lb
7	H. M. C. Quick	Merton	13 st 5 lb	J. M. King	Lady Margaret Boat Club	12 st 8.5 lb
Stroke	J. S. Howles	University	12 st 0 lb	P. D. Hall	Corpus Christi	12 st 6 lb
Cox	W. R. Marsh	University	8 st 10 lb	B. M. Eddy	Pembroke	8 st 10 lb
Source: (P) – boat club president

== Race ==
The Championship Course along which the Boat Race is contested

Cambridge won the toss and elected to start from the Surrey station, handing the Middlesex side of the river to Oxford. On a poor tide and in a strong south-westerly wind, umpire Ellison started the race at 12 noon. Both crews rated 36 for the first minute, after which the Light Blues held a quarter-length lead. Passing Beverley Brook, the bend in the river began to favour Oxford but Cambridge continued to pull away and were clear by a length as the crews passed the Mile Post. They increased the lead by a further half-length as they passed the Crab Tree pub, and although Oxford made several bursts, they passed below Hammersmith Bridge six seconds behind the Light Blues, and fell in behind them, the "first visible gesture of despair" according to The Manchester Guardian's rowing correspondent.

Pushing away from the bridge, Oxford stayed in touch with Cambridge for a brief period, although could not reduce their lead. Rowing into rough water towards Chiswick Eyot, Cambridge moved across to seek shelter closer to the Surrey shore, while Oxford continued in the difficult conditions. A lead of 14 seconds by Chiswick Steps was calmly extended to 20 seconds by the time the crews passed below Barnes Bridge. Cambridge won by eight lengths in a time of 19 minutes 54 seconds, a time which "could have been shortened by at least half a minute had the winners been pressed". It was their sixth victory in the past seven and the fastest winning time since the 1949 race. The rowing correspondent for The Times described the result as a "spectacular reversal of form" having failed to show the pace they demonstrated in practice.
