= The Boat Race 1950 =

96th Boat Race
- Date: 1 April 1950
- Winner: Cambridge
- Margin of victory: 3 1/2 lengths
- Winning time: 20 minutes 15 seconds
- Overall record (Cambridge–Oxford): 52–43
- Umpire: Kenneth Payne (Cambridge)

Other races
- Women's winner: Oxford

The 96th Boat Race took place on 1 April 1950. Held annually, the Boat Race is a side-by-side rowing race between crews from the Universities of Oxford and Cambridge along the River Thames. The Cambridge crew contained three Olympic silver medallists from the 1948 Summer Olympics; six of their crew rowed for Lady Margaret Boat Club. In a race umpired by the Olympic medallist and former Cantabrigian rower Kenneth Payne, Cambridge won by 3 1/2 lengths in a time of 20 minutes 15 seconds, taking the overall record in the event to 52–43 in their favour.

== Background ==
The Boat Race is a side-by-side rowing competition between the University of Oxford (sometimes referred to as the "Dark Blues") and the University of Cambridge (sometimes referred to as the "Light Blues"). First held in 1829, the race takes place on the 4.2-mile (6.8 km) Championship Course on the River Thames in southwest London. The rivalry is a major point of honour between the two universities; it is followed throughout the United Kingdom and, as of 2014, broadcast worldwide. Cambridge went into the race as reigning champions, having won the 1949 race by a quarter of a length, with Cambridge leading overall with 51 victories to Oxford's 43 (excluding the "dead heat" of 1877).

Cambridge were coached by R. Beesly (who had rowed for the Light Blues in the 1927, 1928 and 1929 races), Roy Meldrum (a coach for Lady Margaret Boat Club), Mike Nicholson (non-rowing boat club president for the 1947 race), Harold Rickett (who rowed three times between 1930 and 1932) and R. H. H. Symonds (who had rowed in the 1931 race). Oxford's coaches were T. A. Brocklebank (who had rowed for Cambridge three times between 1929 and 1931 and who had also coached the Light Blues in the 1934 race), R. E. Eason (a Dark Blue in the 1924 race), Hugh "Jumbo" Edwards (who rowed for Oxford in 1926 and 1930) and J. A. MacNabb (who rowed for Cambridge in the 1924 race). The race was umpired for the second time by the former British Olympian Kenneth Payne, who had rowed for Cambridge in the 1932 and 1934 races.

The Light Blues were initially considered "hot favourites" and were described by the rowing correspondent of The Manchester Guardian as "full of brilliant promise" while Oxford were "a collection of competent oarsmen who had to be moulded into a crew". The Observer's G. I. F. Thomson suggested that "it is anyone's race".

== Crews ==
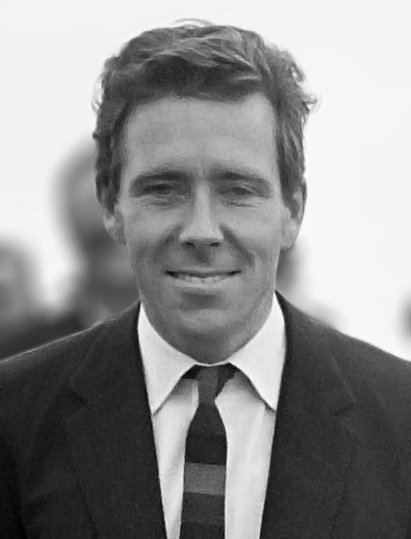
Antony Armstrong-Jones coxed the Cambridge boat.

The Cambridge crew weighed an average of 12 st 8.25 lb (79.8 kg), 4.75 pounds (2.2 kg) per rower more than their opponents. Oxford saw three rowers return to the boat with experience of the event, including number five G. C. Fisk who was rowing in his third consecutive Boat Race. Cambridge's crew contained five rowers who had taken part in the Boat Race previously, including Paul Bircher who was also making his third appearance in the race. Four of the participants in the race were registered as non-British, two in each crew. Oxford's Fisk and Calvert came from Australia, as did Cambridge's Brian Lloyd, while Light Blue W. T. Arthur was South African.

The Cambridge crew contained three rowers who had won silver medals at the 1948 Summer Olympics: Paul Massey, Bircher and Lloyd were in the crew that came second in the men's eight in London. Christopher Davidge, the Oxford University Boat Club president, was forced to drop out of the race through illness. Five of the Oxford rowers were educated at Eton College; six of the Cambridge rowers were studying at St John's College and so rowed for Lady Margaret Boat Club.

Seat	Oxford			Cambridge		
Seat	Name	College	Weight	Name	College	Weight
Bow	J. G. C. Blacker	Balliol	12 st 2 lb	H. H. Almond	Lady Margaret Boat Club	10 st 6 lb
2	P. Gladstone	Christ Church	12 st 11 lb	D. M. Jennens	Clare	12 st 4 lb
3	H. J. Renton	Magdalen	12 st 4 lb	A. L. Macleod (P)	Lady Margaret Boat Club	12 st 9 lb
4	J. M. Clay	Magdalen	12 st 7.5 lb	P. M. O. Massey	Lady Margaret Boat Club	13 st 9 lb
5	G. C. Fisk	Oriel	11 st 10.5 lb	W. T. Arthur	Lady Margaret Boat Club	13 st 0 lb
6	J. Hayes	New College	13 st 0 lb	E. A. P. Bircher	Christ's	13 st 6 lb
7	D. N. Callender	Trinity	12 st 4 lb	C. B. M. Lloyd	Lady Margaret Boat Club	12 st 9 lb
Stroke	A. J. M. Cavenagh	Magdalen	11 st 3 lb	J. L. M. Crick	Lady Margaret Boat Club	12 st 8 lb
Cox	J. E. C. Hinchliffe	Trinity	8 st 6 lb	A. C. R. Armstrong-Jones	Jesus	8 st 8 lb
Source: (P) – boat club president Christopher Davidge acted as Oxford's non-rowing president.

== Race ==
The Championship Course along which the Boat Race is contested

Oxford won the toss and elected to start from the Surrey station, handing the Middlesex side of the river to Cambridge. Umpire Payne started the race at 12:30 p.m., with the Dark Blues making a slightly faster start; after a minute they were about a canvas-length ahead of their opponents. Although having the outside of the first bend, they had extended their lead to a quarter of a length by Craven Cottage. By the time the crews passed the Mile Post, Cambridge were leading by a quarter-length which they extended to half a length by Harrods Furniture Depository. Cambridge's stroke John Louis Mingaye Crick increased his crew's rate; his opposite number Cavenagh responded to prevent the Light Blues going clear.

While the conditions were not too rough, both crews slowed their stroke rate, with Cambridge passing below Hammersmith Bridge still half a length ahead. As they passed The Doves pub, Oxford slowly began to gain, rating marginally higher. Cavenagh pushed on again before Chiswick Eyot but could not prevent the Light Blues extending their lead to nearly a length by the time the crews passed Chiswick Steps. Despite further spurts from Oxford, Cambridge's "better stride" saw them pass below Barnes Bridge two and a half lengths ahead. Cambridge passed the finishing post leading by three and a half lengths in a time of 20 minutes 15 seconds, their fourth consecutive win in the slowest time since the 1947 race. The victory took the overall record in the event to 52–43 in their favour. The rowing correspondent for The Times noted that "Cambridge rowed far better than they have recently" while "Oxford surpassed what anyone could reasonably have expected from them." The Manchester Guardian's rowing correspondent declared that Cambridge's crew was "generally acknowledged to be one of the best seen on the tideway", and that "Oxford could not, short of shipwreck or piracy, win the race". Writing in The Observer, G. I. F. Thomson noted of Cambridge that "all through practice they had shown more promising form and power, as well as unity" while Oxford had "made great strides ... and were never out of the running."
