= The Boat Race 1880 =

37th Boat Race
- Date: 22 March 1880
- Winner: Oxford
- Margin of victory: 3 3/4 lengths
- Winning time: 21 minutes 23 seconds
- Overall record (Cambridge–Oxford): 17–19
- Umpire: Joseph William Chitty (Oxford)

The 37th Boat Race, an annual side-by-side rowing race between crews from the Universities of Oxford and Cambridge along the River Thames, took place on 22 March 1880 following a postponement two days earlier as a result of thick fog. It is the only time in the history of the event that the race has been rescheduled. Oxford won by a margin of 3 3/4 lengths in a time of 21 minutes 23 seconds.

== Background ==
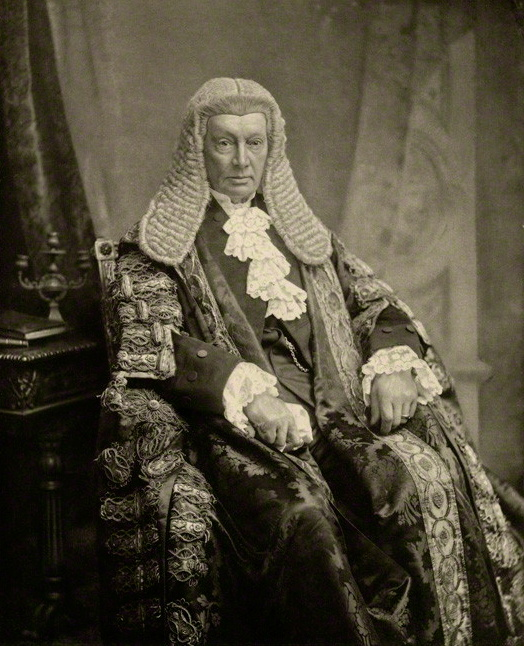
The umpire for the 1880 Boat Race was Joseph William Chitty.

The Boat Race is an annual rowing eight competition between the University of Oxford and the University of Cambridge. First held in 1829, the competition is a 4.2-mile (6.8 km) race along The Championship Course on the River Thames in southwest London. The rivalry is a major point of honour between the two universities and followed throughout the United Kingdom and worldwide. Cambridge went into the race as reigning champions, having won the previous year's race by three lengths. However, Oxford held the overall lead, with 18 victories to Cambridge's 17 (excluding the "dead heat" of 1877).

Oxford's coaches were George Drinkwater Bourne (who rowed in the 1842 race) and Tom Edwards-Moss (who rowed four times for Oxford between the 1875 and 1878 race). There is no record of Cambridge's coaches. The race was umpired, for the final time, by Joseph William Chitty who had rowed for Oxford twice in 1849 (in the March and December races) and the 1852 race, while the starter was Edward Searle. The race was originally scheduled for the preceding Saturday, 20 March, but was postponed until the Monday by the umpire as a result of thick fog. It is the only time the history of the event that such a course of action has been taken.

== Crews ==
The Oxford crew weighed an average of 11 st 13 lb (75.6 kg), 3.5 pounds (1.6 kg) more than their opponents. The Cambridge crew contained three rowers with previous Boat Race experience, including the Cambridge University Boat Club president Edward Henry Prest who was participating in his third race. Similarly Oxford saw three former Blues return, including H. B. Southwell rowing for a third time.

For the first time in the history of the event, two of the competitors were registered as non-British, both rowing for Cambridge. Their number three, William Barton, was born in Wellington, New Zealand, while the number five, C. N. L. Armytage (whose cousin George had rowed in the 1874 race), was recorded as being Australian.

| Seat | Oxford | | | Cambridge | | |
| Seat | Name | College | Weight | Name | College | Weight |
|---|---|---|---|---|---|---|
| Bow | R. H. J. Poole | Brasenose | 10 st 6 lb | E. H. Prest | Jesus | 10 st 12 lb |
| 2 | D. E. Brown | Hertford | 12 st 6 lb | H. Sandford | Lady Margaret Boat Club | 11 st 5.5 lb |
| 3 | F. M. Hargreaves | Keble | 12 st 2 lb | W. Barton | Lady Margaret Boat Club | 11 st 3.5 lb |
| 4 | H. B. Southwell | Pembroke | 12 st 0 lb | W. M. Warlow | Queens' | 12 st 0 lb |
| 5 | R. S. Kindersley | Exeter | 12 st 8 lb | C. N. L. Armytage | Jesus | 12 st 2.5 lb |
| 6 | G. D. Rowe (P) | University | 12 st 3 lb | R. D. Davis | 1st Trinity | 12 st 8.5 lb |
| 7 | J. H. T. Wharton | Magdalen | 11 st 10 lb | R. D. Prior | Queens' | 11 st 13 lb |
| Stroke | L. R. West | Christ Church | 11 st 1 lb | W. W. Baillie | Jesus | 11 st 2.5 lb |
| Cox | C. W. Hunt | Corpus Christi | 7 st 5 lb | B. S. Clark | Lady Margaret Boat Club | 7 st 0 lb |
Source: (P) – boat club president (Cambridge's non-rowing president was John Arthur Watson-Taylor)

== Race ==
The Championship Course, along which the race is conducted

Oxford won the toss and elected to start from the Middlesex station, handing the Surrey side of the river to Cambridge. At the time of the race, which commenced at 10.40 a.m., there was a strong easterly wind. With a higher stroke rate than their opponents, the Light Blues took the lead from the start and by Craven Steps were almost clear. At the Mile Post, Oxford had cut the lead to half a length, but were forced to take evasive action to avoid a collision with river traffic.

By Hammersmith Bridge, Cambridge were nearly clear again, but at The Doves pub, Oxford's stroke L. R. West increased the rate and reduced the deficit. Despite catching a "crab", the Dark Blues continued to overhaul Cambridge and were level by the bottom of Chiswick Eyot. They took the lead along Chiswick Reach, held a two length advantage at Barnes Bridge and passed the finishing post "fairly comfortably". They won by 3 3/4 lengths in a time of 21 minutes 23 seconds, securing their second victory in three years and taking the overall record to 19–17 in their favour.
