= The Boat Race 1952 =

1952 boat race between Oxford and Cambridge universities

98th Boat Race
- Date: 29 March 1952
- Winner: Oxford
- Margin of victory: Canvas
- Winning time: 20 minutes 23 seconds
- Overall record (Cambridge–Oxford): 53–44
- Umpire: Kenneth Payne (Cambridge)

Other races
- Women's winner: Cambridge

The 98th Boat Race took place on 29 March 1952. Held annually, the Boat Race is a side-by-side rowing race between crews from the Universities of Oxford and Cambridge along the River Thames. In a race umpired by former Cambridge rower Kenneth Payne, Oxford won by a canvas in a time of 20 minutes 23 seconds. At no point during the contest was there clear water between the boats. The race, described as "one of the closest fought of all time", was their second win in seven years and took the overall record in the event to 53–44 in Cambridge's favour.

== Background ==
The Boat Race is a side-by-side rowing competition between the University of Oxford (sometimes referred to as the "Dark Blues") and the University of Cambridge (sometimes referred to as the "Light Blues"). First held in 1829, the race takes place on the 4.2-mile (6.8 km) Championship Course on the River Thames in southwest London. The rivalry is a major point of honour between the two universities; it is followed throughout the United Kingdom and, as of 2014, broadcast worldwide. Cambridge went into the race as reigning champions, having won the 1951 race by a 3 1/2 lengths, and had won the previous five races. They led overall with 53 victories to Oxford's 43 (excluding the "dead heat" of 1877).

Oxford's coaches were A. J. M. Durand (who had rowed for the Dark Blues in the 1920 race), Hugh "Jumbo" Edwards (who rowed for Oxford in 1926 and 1930), R. D. Hill (who rowed in the 1940 wartime race) and J. H. Page. Cambridge were coached by C. B. M. Lloyd (three-time Blue between 1949 and 1951), Roy Meldrum (a coach for Lady Margaret Boat Club), James Owen and Harold Rickett (who rowed three times between 1930 and 1932). The race was umpired for the third time by the former British Olympian Kenneth Payne, who had rowed for Cambridge in the 1932 and 1934 races.

Although Cambridge had arrived at Putney as clear favourites to win, Oxford's improvements during the build-up to the race had shortened their odds: as the rowing correspondent in The Manchester Guardian suggested, "anything might happen". The rowing correspondent for The Times reported that Cambridge were "quoted as even" but would "still start [the] race as favourites". Moreover, the crews were "extraordinarily evenly matched, but Oxford have a very good chance of breaking the run of Cambridge wins."

== Crews ==
The Cambridge crew weighed an average of 12 st 11.5 lb (81.2 kg), 2.5 pounds (1.1 kg) per rower more than their opponents. Oxford's crew contained three rowers with Boat Race experience including Christopher Davidge, their stroke, who was making his third appearance in the event. Cambridge saw three participants return, including cox John Hinde. Oxford's number six Ken Keniston was the only participant registered as non-British; the former Harvard University rower was from the United States.

| Seat | Oxford | | | Cambridge | | |
| Seat | Name | College | Weight | Name | College | Weight |
|---|---|---|---|---|---|---|
| Bow | N. W. Sanders | Merton | 10 st 7 lb | E. J. N. T. Coghill | Pembroke | 12 st 4 lb |
| 2 | P. Gladstone | Christ Church | 12 st 12 lb | G. A. H. Cadbury | King's | 12 st 2 lb |
| 3 | C. D. Milling | Merton | 12 st 1 lb | J. G. P. Crowden (P) | Pembroke | 12 st 8 lb |
| 4 | L. A. F. Stokes (P) | New College | 13 st 0 lb | G. T. Marshall | King's | 13 st 6.5 lb |
| 5 | M. L. Thomas | Jesus | 13 st 6 lb | J. R. Dingle | Lady Margaret Boat Club | 14 st 0 lb |
| 6 | K. H. Keniston | Balliol | 13 st 6 lb | R. F. A. Sharpley | Lady Margaret Boat Club | 13 st 8 lb |
| 7 | H. M. C. Quick | Merton | 13 st 4 lb | N. B. M. Clack | Lady Margaret Boat Club | 12 st 9 lb |
| Stroke | C. G. V. Davidge | Trinity | 12 st 7 lb | J. S. M. Jones | Lady Margaret Boat Club | 12 st 7 lb |
| Cox | D. R. Glynne-Jones | Jesus | 8 st 12 lb | J. F. K. Hinde | Pembroke | 9 st 3 lb |
Source: (P) – boat club president

== Race ==
The Championship Course along which the Boat Race is contested

Cambridge won the toss and elected to start from the Middlesex station, handing the Surrey side of the river to Oxford. The weather was inclement, with gale-force winds and snow disrupting the race, and limiting the number of spectators lining the banks of the Thames to a few thousand. Umpire Payne started the race at 3:15 p.m. Cambridge made the cleaner start in the rough conditions, and held a quarter-length lead at the Dukes' Head pub. Despite making a number of spurts, the Light Blues could not pull away from Oxford, the Dark Blues' stroke maintaining a higher stroke rate to keep in touch. Keeping to more sheltered conditions yet in slower water, Cambridge passed the Mile Post with a lead of half a length.

With the bend in the river beginning to favour Oxford, the lead was slowly eroded until both boats passed nearly level below Hammersmith Bridge. Alongside Chiswick Eyot, the Dark Blues were almost half-a-length ahead but not gaining further. Cambridge's cox Hinde pushed the Oxford boat towards the centre of the river and as they passed under Barnes Bridge the Dark Blue lead was down to less than a quarter of a length. Oxford won by a canvas (approximately 9 feet (2.7 m)) in a time of 20 minutes 23 seconds, the narrowest margin of victory since 1877, and their first win in six attempts. At no point during the course of the race did either boat have a clear water advantage over their opponent. The rowing correspondent for The Manchester Guardian described the race as "one of the closest fought of all time", while Ian Thomson, writing in The Observer suggested it was "one of the most exciting races ever rowed."
