= The Boat Race 1966 =

112th Boat Race
- Date: 26 March 1966
- Winner: Oxford
- Margin of victory: 3 3/4 lengths
- Winning time: 19 minutes 12 seconds
- Overall record (Cambridge–Oxford): 61–50
- Umpire: Alan Burrough (Cambridge)

Other races
- Reserve winner: Isis
- Women's winner: Cambridge

The 112th Boat Race took place on 26 March 1966. Held annually, the event is a side-by-side rowing race between crews from the Universities of Oxford and Cambridge along the River Thames. The race was won by Oxford by 3 3/4 lengths. Isis won the reserve race while Cambridge won the Women's Boat Race.

== Background ==
The Boat Race is a side-by-side rowing competition between the University of Oxford (sometimes referred to as the "Dark Blues") and the University of Cambridge (sometimes referred to as the "Light Blues"). The race was first held in 1829, and since 1845 has taken place on the 4.2-mile (6.8 km) Championship Course on the River Thames in southwest London. The rivalry is a major point of honour between the two universities, followed throughout the United Kingdom and broadcast worldwide. Oxford went into the race as reigning champions, having won the previous year's race by 3 3/4 lengths. Cambridge, however, held the overall lead with 61 victories to Oxford's 49 (excluding the "dead heat" of 1877).

The first Women's Boat Race took place in 1927, but did not become an annual fixture until the 1960s. Up until 2014, the contest was conducted as part of the Henley Boat Races, but as of the 2015 race, it is held on the River Thames, on the same day as the men's main and reserve races. The reserve race, contested between Oxford's Isis boat and Cambridge's Goldie boat has been held since 1965. It usually takes place on the Tideway, prior to the main Boat Race.

Two days before the main race and in inclement weather, the Cambridge boat began to sink and was pushed into barges and tugs moored below Beverley Brook. The crew were rescued and according to their boat club president Mike Sweeney, the incident would have no impact on the Light Blues: "we shall just get into our other boat and race in that". It was the first Boat Race vessel to sink since the 1951 race. The Light Blues would row in the same boat in which they won the 1962 and 1964 races, while Oxford's craft was manufactured by Swiss firm Stämpfli Racing Boats. Both boats were German-rigged, where the number four and five row on the bow side. The inclement weather continued until the day of the race, with further disruption predicted and the threat of postponement a real one. The race was umpired by the former Cambridge University Boat Club president and rower Alan Burrough who took part in Cambridge's victory in the 1939 race.

The Cambridge crew were coached by D. C. Christie (who rowed for Cambridge in the 1958 and 1959 races), J. G. P. Crowden (who won Blues in the 1951 and the 1952 races), D. M. Jennens (who rowed three times between 1949 and 1951) and I. W. Welsh (who participated in the 1956 race). Oxford's coach was Ronnie Howard who had rowed for the Dark Blues in the 1957 and 1959 races.

== Crews ==
The Cambridge crew weighed an average of 13 st 7 lb (85.5 kg), 1.6 pounds (0.7 kg) per rower more than their opponents. Oxonians Chris and Richard Freeman became the first brothers to row in the Boat Race since 1935 race. The Oxford crew contained a single former Blue, the boat club president and number two Duncan Clegg, while Cambridge saw Rodney Ward and stroke Mike Sweeeny return. Oxford's P. G. Tuke was following in the footsteps of his great grandfather F. E. Tuke who had rowed in the 1845 race. There were three non-British participants in the race, the Oxford cox Jim Rogers, and Cambridge rowers J. H. Ashby and P. H. Conze were all American.

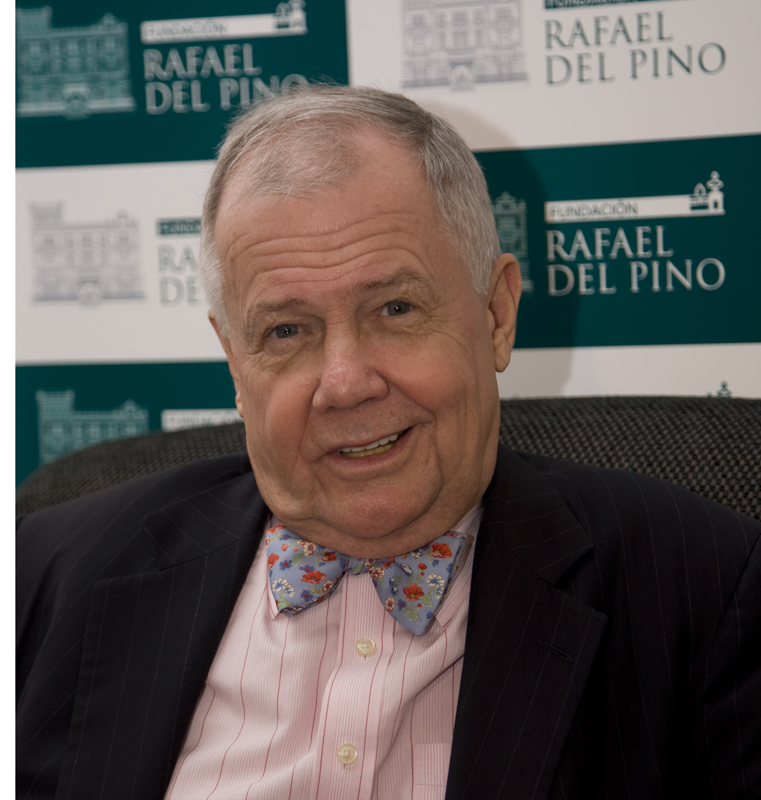
Jim Rogers was Oxford's cox for the race.

Seat	Oxford			Cambridge		
Seat	Name	College	Weight	Name	College	Weight
Bow	R. A. D. Freeman	Magdalen	13 st 0 lb	M. E. K. Graham	Lady Margaret Boat Club	13 st 7 lb
2	R. D. Clegg (P)	St Edmund Hall	13 st 3 lb	M. D. Tebay	1st & 3rd Trinity	13 st 4 lb
3	F. C. Carr	Keble	13 st 4 lb	J. H. Ashby	1st & 3rd Trinity	13 st 2 lb
4	C. H. Freeman ‡	Keble	14 st 3 lb	P. G. R. Delafield	Jesus	14 st 8 lb
5	J. K. Mullard	Keble	13 st 7 lb	R. G. Ward	Queens'	14 st 12 lb
6	P. G. Tuke	Keble	13 st 11 lb	P. H. Conze	1st & 3rd Trinity	12 st 10 lb
7	E. C. Meyer	University	13 st 4 lb	L. M. Henderson	Selwyn	13 st 6 lb
Stroke	M. S. Kennard	St Edmund Hall	12 st 11 lb	M. A. Sweeney (P)	Lady Margaret Boat Club	12 st 10 lb
Cox	J. B. Rogers jr.	Balliol	9 st 1 lb	I. A. B. Brooksby	Lady Margaret Boat Club	9 st 0 lb
Source: (P) – Boat club president C. H. Freeman replaced C. E. Albert four days before the race.

== Race ==
The Championship Course along which the Boat Race is contested

Oxford won the toss and elected to start from the Surrey station. Despite the prediction of poor weather and the threat of postponement, the race commenced at the planned time of 4.15pm. Oxford made the better start and were half-a-length up on Cambridge, but with the advantage of the Middlesex bend, the Light Blues were one second behind at the Mile Post. Oxford reacted to a Cambridge push at Harrods Furniture Depository to maintain the lead which they extended to two seconds by Hammersmith Bridge. The Dark Blues continued to contain Cambridge's attempts to reduce the deficit and by Chiswick Steps had clear water with a three-second advantage. Pushing away once again, and with a two-length lead, Oxford's cox Jim Rogers steered them across the Cambridge boat to the Middlesex side, and were ten seconds ahead at Barnes Bridge. Oxford won by 3 3/4 lengths in a time of 19 minutes 12 seconds.

In the reserve race, and after a false start, Oxford's Isis beat Cambridge's Goldie by seventh lengths, their second consecutive victory, in a time of 19 minutes 22 seconds. In the 21st running of the Women's Boat Race, Cambridge triumphed, their fourth consecutive victory.
