= Lady Margaret Boat Club =

University rowing club affiliated to St John's College, Cambridge

- Motto: Si je puis (French, "If I can")
- Location: Cambridge, England
- Coordinates: 52°12′48.5″N 0°7′34″E
- Home water: River Cam
- Founded: 1825
- Affiliations: St John's College, University of Cambridge, British Rowing, CUCBC
- Website: http://www.ladymargaretboatclub.org

Events
- May Bumps, Lent Bumps, Henley Boat Races

Distinctions
- Men: Head of the Mays. May Bumps 2016-2018, and 2024-2025; Men: Head of the Lents. Lent Bumps 2017, 2018, 2020, and 2022-2025

Notable members
- Patrick Colquhoun, John Goldie, Annamarie Phelps

The Lady Margaret Boat Club (abbreviated to "LMBC" and known as "Maggie") is the rowing club for members of St John's College, Cambridge, England. The club is named after Lady Margaret Beaufort, founder of the College.

== History ==
LMBC was founded in 1825 by twelve members of the College as the first college boat club in Cambridge. In its original rules, the Club was to "consist of eighteen contributing members, besides honorary ones", and all members had to be able to row. An early member was Patrick Colquhoun who in 1837 instigated the Colquhoun Sculls, in the year in which he won the Wingfield Sculls.

The greatest influence in the 1860s and 1870s was J. H. D. Goldie, who raised LMBC to the "Headship of the River", won the "Colquhoun Sculls", and stroked Cambridge four times. The Goldie Boathouse, used by the university crews, commemorates his services to Cambridge rowing as does the name of the university second VIII, officially known as the Goldie Crew (or Boat) and competes annually against Isis just before the University Boat Race. Another important name in LMBC history is LHK Bushe-Fox who had a long career with LMBC, becoming President of the Club in 1897. One of the greatest influences of the 20th century was Roy Meldrum who established the "Lady Margaret" style, which he detailed in his rowing books.

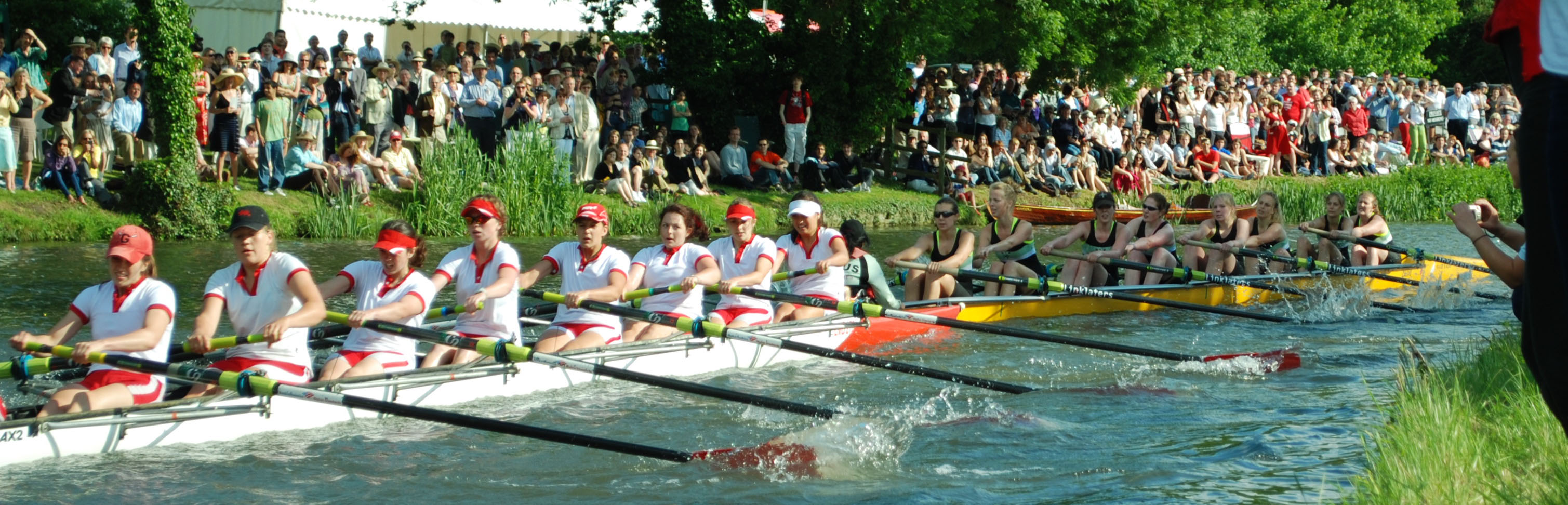
W1 bumping Caius, May bumps 2010

The Boathouse was opened in the May term of 1901. It was extended in the 1970s, and was the first boathouse to have a workshop for the boatman. In the early 1980s, when the college began to admit women, further modifications were made upstairs to create the women's changing rooms. The boathouse was extended further in 2000 to create more indoor training space. A shed is now being built to house the club's fours, which are currently racked outside.

The Club's heyday was in the late 1940s and 1950s. LMBC won the "Ladies Plate" in 1949 with a new course record. In 1950, they made 4 bumps to go "Head of the Mays", and stayed "Head" for five years. In 1951, Lady Margaret won the Grand at Henley Royal Regatta and had five members of the successful Cambridge crew, which also defeated Harvard and Yale in the United States.

Between 1975 and 1981, Lady Margaret were Head of the Lent Bumps for 26 consecutive days of racing, the longest continuous defence of the Lent Headship. LMBC took the men's May Headship on day 4 of the 2016 races (bumping Caius), the first time they had held the Headship since 1989. LMBC retained the Mays headship in 2017 and 2018.

In Lent Bumps 2017, LMBC took the men's Lents Headship on day 3 (bumping Downing), the first time they had held the Headship since 1990. LMBC retained the Lents headship in 2018, lost it in 2019, but regained it in 2020 and held it in 2022.

In March 2017, Lady Margaret's men's first boat represented the Cambridge colleges in the Men's Intercollegiate fixture at the Henley Boat Races against Oriel College, Oxford. Lady Margaret won with a verdict of 4 lengths.

== Traditions ==
Members of the club are well known for their scarlet jackets, which gave rise to the modern term blazer. Members with "First May Colours" are entitled to wear trim and gold buttons on their blazer, while "First Lent" or "Second May Colours" are entitled to wear silver buttons on their blazer.

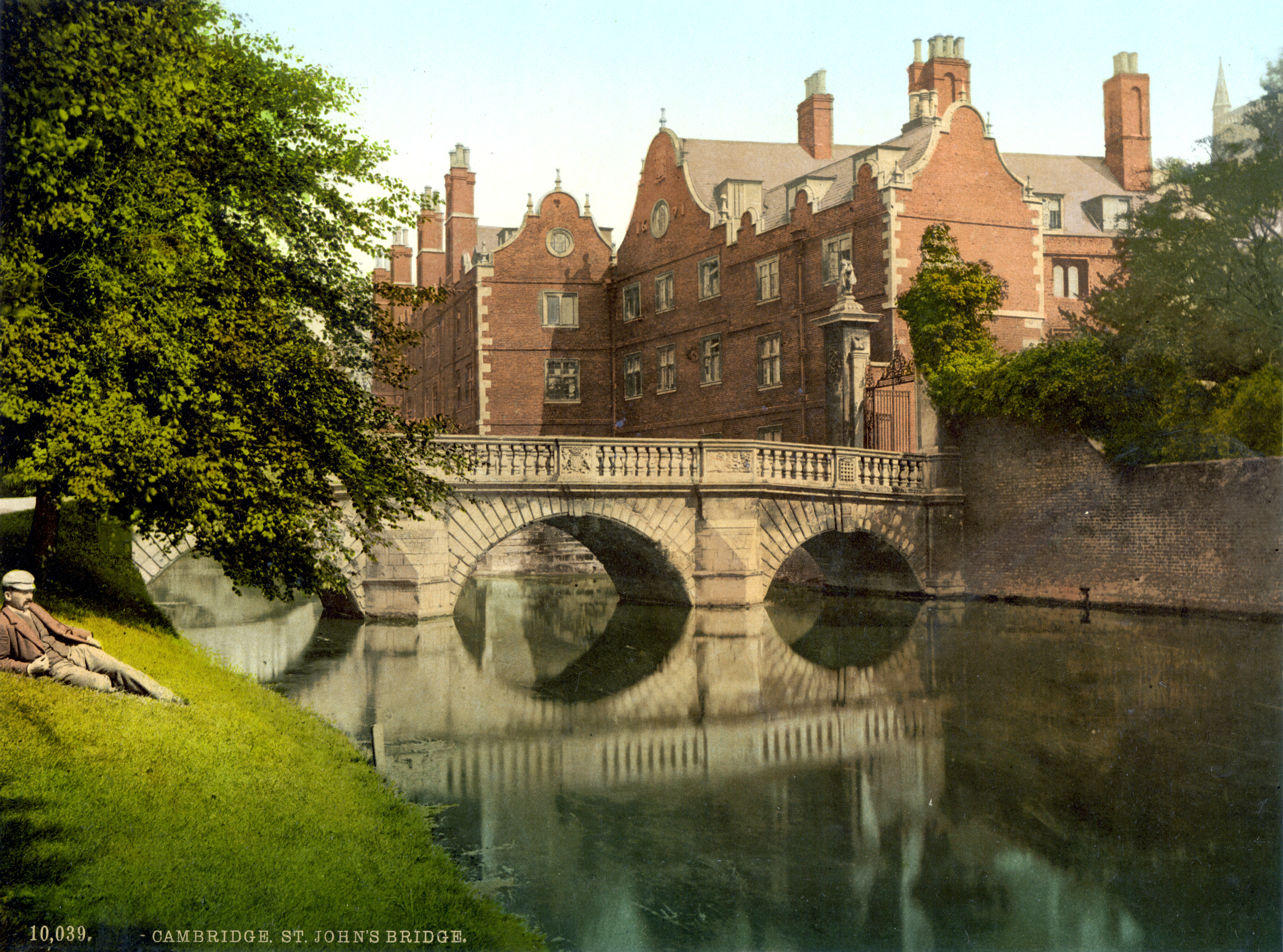
St John's College, Cambridge

The club is traditionally strong in the Lent and May CUCBC Bumps race. Due to its affiliation with St John's College, the club always fields many, often very successful, boats with first-time rowers during the first university term. Club members also often go to row with university lightweight and heavyweight crews to compete against Oxford.

The club motto has been "Si je puis" ("If I can") since 1825. The boat club song, Viva laeta, has a chorus that goes as follows:

Vive laeta, Margareta, Beatorum insulis;
Si possimus, Fuerimus, Semper caput fluminis.

Live joyfully, Margaret, on the islands of the blessed;
If we can, We will always be the head of the river.

Although the music is printed in the boat club's history and the song is sung at every Boat Club Dinner, few members know the tune. Dinners are also known for more controversial songs (such as the infamous "M2 song" sung by all current and many past members of the Second Men's May Bumps Crew).

== Rivalry with Trinity College ==
St John's has long had a close rivalry with Trinity College. Every year, a strange tradition takes place during the Bumps Weeks in Lent and May term, known as the "Stomp". Crews gather on the College Backs every morning preceding the races. One crew at a time will stop at a lone tree, knock three times on its trunk and shout out the name of the crew that will be starting in front of them that day to be "bumped". The whole club then strolls through the backs towards arch-rivals Trinity. Once in Trinity College's great court, a standoff between the rival boat clubs occurs followed by a tackling session in which boat club members from each side attempt to "kidnap" members of the opposite club. If captured, one is put to shame by being bought breakfast in the rival college's hall.

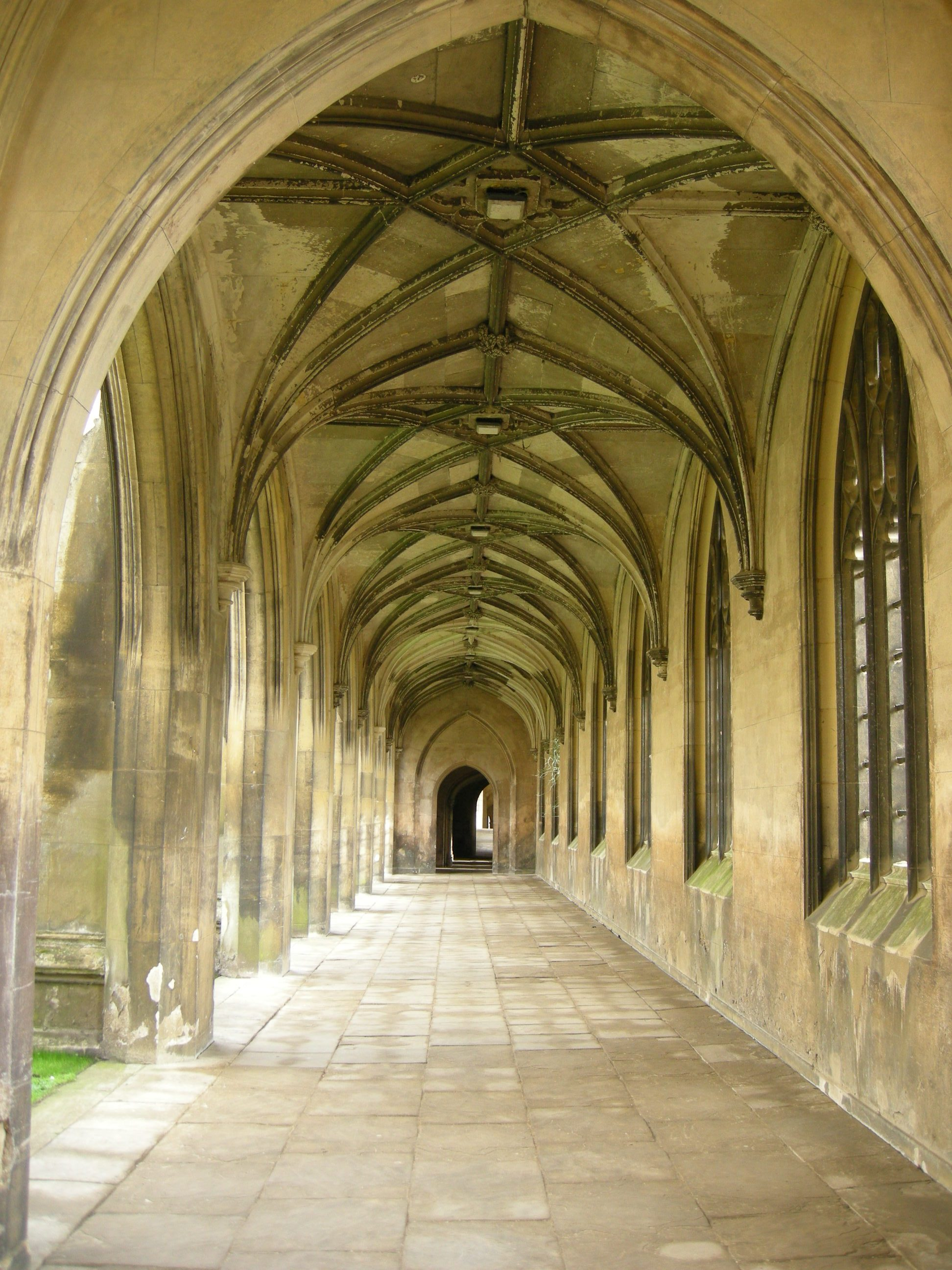
St John's College

== Honours ==
=== Henley Royal Regatta ===
Year	Races won
1854	Visitors' Challenge Cup
1855	Visitors' Challenge Cup
1856	Visitors' Challenge Cup
1873	Diamond Challenge Sculls
1874	Diamond Challenge Sculls
1875	Diamond Challenge Sculls
1879	Ladies' Challenge Plate, Visitors' Challenge Cup
1888	Ladies' Challenge Plate, Thames Challenge Cup
1913	Wyfold Challenge Cup
1914	Visitors' Challenge Cup
1925	Ladies' Challenge Plate
1930	Ladies' Challenge Plate
1933	Ladies' Challenge Plate
1949	Ladies' Challenge Plate
1950	Visitors' Challenge Cup
1951	Grand Challenge Cup, Silver Goblets & Nickalls' Challenge Cup
1952	Ladies' Challenge Plate
1959	Ladies' Challenge Plate
1961	Ladies' Challenge Plate
1966	Ladies' Challenge Plate, Visitors' Challenge Cup
1974	Prince Philip Challenge Cup

=== Boat Race representatives ===
The following rowers represented the club at the time of their participation in The Boat Race.

Men's boat race

Year	Name
1829	Charles Merivale
1829	W. Snow
1829	George Selwyn
1836	Alfred Hudson Shadwell
1840	Alfred Hudson Shadwell
1842	F. E. Tower
1845	W. Harkness
1845	R. Harkness
1846	George Francis Murdoch
1846	Robert Harkness
1846	T. B Lloyd (cox)
1852	H. E. Tuckey
1854	J. Wright
1856	H. Williams
1856	J. M'Cormick
1856	Herbert Snow
1857	P. Pennant Pearson
1857	Herbert Snow
1858	W. J. Havart
1858	H. Williams
1859	H. Williams
1859	G. A. Paley
1861	W. H. Tarleton
1862	P. F. Gorst
1863	C. La Mothe
1864	W. Hawkins
1865	H. Watney
1865	M. H. L. Beebee
1866	H. Watney
1866	A. Forbes (cox)
1867	J. M. Collard
1867	H. Watney
1867	A. Forbes (cox)
1869	J. W. Dale
1869	J. H. D. Goldie
1870	J. W. Dale
1870	J. H. D. Goldie
1871	J. H. D. Goldie
1872	J. H. D. Goldie
1874	P. J. Hibbert
1875	P. J. Hibbert
1879	H. Sandford
1880	H. Sandford
1880	W. Barton
1880	B. S. Clark
1881	H. Sandford
1885	N. P. Symonds
1886	N. P. Symonds
1895	R. Y. Bonsey
1896	R. Y. Bonsey

Year	Name
1904	H. Sanger
1905	H. Sanger
1906	A. G. L. Hunt
1914	D. I. Day
1920	P. H. G. H.-S. Hartley
1921	P. H. G. H.-S. Hartley
1922	P. H. G. H.-S. Hartley
1923	F. W. Law
1924	G. L. Elliot-Smith
1925	G. L. Elliot-Smith
1926	M. F. A. Keen
1926	B. T. Craggs
1926	L. V. Bevan
1927	L. V. Bevan
1928	R. A. Symonds
1930	D. Haig-Thomas
1931	D. Haig-Thomas
1931	R. H. H. Symonds
1932	D. Haig-Thomas
1946	J. S. Paton-Philip
1949	A. L. Macleod
1949	C. B. M. Lloyd
1949	P. M. O. Massey
1950	H. H. Almond
1950	A. L. Macleod
1950	P. M. O. Massey
1950	W. T. Arthur
1950	C. B. M. Lloyd
1950	J. L. M. Crick
1951	H. H. Almond
1951	D. D. Macklin
1951	R. F. A. Sharpley
1951	E. J. Worlidge
1951	C. B. M. Lloyd
1952	J. R. Dingle
1952	R. F. A. Sharpley
1952	N. B. M. Clack
1952	J. S. M. Jones
1953	J. A. N. Wallis
1953	J. S. M. Jones
1953	J. M. King
1954	J. A. N. Wallis
1955	A. R. Muirhead
1956	J. F. Hall-Craggs
1959	J. R. Owen
1960	J. R. Owen
1960	F. P. T. Wiggins
1960	J. Parker
1960	E. T. C. Johnstone
1960	P. W. Holmes

Year	Name
1961	A. J. Collier
1962	R. A. Napier
1962	A. J. Collier
1964	R. G. Stanbury (cox)
1965	M. A. Sweeney
1965	R. G. Stanbury (cox)
1966	M. E. K. Graham
1966	M. A. Sweeney
1966	I. A. B. Brooksby (cox)
1967	R. D. Yarrow
1967	D. F. Earl
1972	G. A. Cadwalader
1973	D. P. Sturge
1975	J. MacLeod
1975	P. J. Robinson
1975	A. N. Christie
1977	R. C. Ross
1978	R. C. Ross
1979	R. C. Ross
1980	M. F. Panter
1981	M. F. Panter
1982	P. St J. Brine
1982	C. D. Heard
1983	C. D. Heard
1983	P. R. W. Sheppard
1983	J. L. D. Garrett
1984	J. L. D. Garrett
1985	J. L. D. Garrett
1985	H. L. Shaw (cox)
1987	Jim R. Garman
1988	Jim R. Garman
1988	Guy Pooley
1989	Jim R. Garman
1989	Guy Pooley
1990	Guy Pooley
1991	Guy Pooley
2000	Richard A. Ehlers
2001	Tom M Edwards-Moss
2016	Charles Fisher
2018	Charles Fisher
2021	Theo Weinberger
2024	Thomas Marsh

Women's boat race

Year	Name
2016	Fiona Macklin
2024	Gemma King
2024	Jo Matthews
2025	Gemma King
2026	Gemma King

== See also ==
- University rowing (UK)
- Henley Boat Race
- University of Cambridge
