= Patrick Delafield =

British former rower and businessman

Pat Delafield
Personal information
- Full name: Patrick Geoffrey Robert Delafield
- Nationality: British
- Born: 14 April 1946 (age 80)

Patrick Geoffrey Robert "Pat" Delafield (born 14 April 1946) is a British former rower and businessman. He competed for Great Britain in the 1972 Summer Olympics.

== Education and rowing career ==
Delafield was educated at Cambridge University where he studied Law. He rowed for Cambridge in The Boat Race in the 1966, 1967 and 1968 races. In 1968 with Delafield as president, Cambridge started a streak of six consecutive wins. In 1970 Delafield was runner up in the Diamond Challenge Sculls at Henley Royal Regatta. He participated in the 1970 World Rowing Championships competing in the doubles sculls event with Jeremiah McCarthy where they finished in seventh place overall after winning the B final.

In 1972 he partnered Tim Crooks to win the Double Sculls Challenge Cup at Henley and won the double sculls with Crooks, at the inaugural 1972 National Rowing Championships. Delafield and Crooks competed for Great Britain at the 1972 Summer Olympics in the double sculls and came fifth overall. Delafield was President of Leander Club from 2003 to 2008.

== Business career ==
Delafield spent many years in the beverage business in Western and Eastern Europe with Guinness and Stroh Brewery Company of Detroit. He lived in Jersey for 25 years and headed up G. Orange & Co., Beverage Merchants in Jersey from 1997 to 2004 and became director of business development with Victor Hugo Wines in 2005. He was a director of Noventa until his resignation in 2009.

== See also ==
- List of Cambridge University Boat Race crews
