= The Boat Race 1951 =

97th Boat Race
- Date: 24/26 March 1951
- Winner: Cambridge
- Margin of victory: 12 lengths
- Winning time: 20 minutes 50 seconds
- Overall record (Cambridge–Oxford): 53–43
- Umpire: Gerald Ellison (Oxford)

Other races
- Women's winner: Oxford

The 97th Boat Race took place on 24 and 26 March 1951. Held annually, the Boat Race is a side-by-side rowing race between crews from the Universities of Oxford and Cambridge along the River Thames. After Oxford sank in the first race held on 24 March, a re-row was ordered by the umpire and took place two days later. It was the first time one of the crews had sunk during the race since the 1925 race. In a race umpired by former Oxford rower Gerald Ellison, Cambridge won the re-row by twelve lengths in a time of 20 minutes 50 seconds, taking the overall record in the event to 53–43 in their favour.

== Background ==
The Boat Race is a side-by-side rowing competition between the University of Oxford (sometimes referred to as the "Dark Blues") and the University of Cambridge (sometimes referred to as the "Light Blues"). First held in 1829, the race takes place on the 4.2-mile (6.8 km) Championship Course on the River Thames in southwest London. The rivalry is a major point of honour between the two universities; it is followed throughout the United Kingdom and, as of 2014, broadcast worldwide. Cambridge went into the race as reigning champions, having won the 1950 race by 3 1/2 lengths, with Cambridge leading overall with 52 victories to Oxford's 43 (excluding the "dead heat" of 1877).

Cambridge were coached by W. T. Arthur (who rowed for the Light Blues in the 1950 race), Roy Meldrum (a coach for Lady Margaret Boat Club), James Owen and H. R. N. Rickett (who rowed three times between 1930 and 1932). Oxford's coaches were T. A. Brocklebank (who had rowed for Cambridge three times between 1929 and 1931 and who had also coached the Light Blues in the 1934 race), J. L. Garton (who had rowed for the Dark Blues in the 1938 and 1939 races) and J. A. MacNabb (who rowed for Cambridge in the 1924 race). The race was umpired for the first time by former Oxford rower and Gerald Ellison, the Bishop of Willesden, who had competed in the 1932 and 1933 races.

The Light Blues were considered to be firm favourites, yet the rowing correspondent for The Times suggested that "the outcome is anything but certain". The rowing correspondent writing in The Manchester Guardian stated that "if Oxford to-day can make the most of their superiority in weight and good fighting spirit the race is by no means lost to them".

== Crews ==
The Oxford crew weighed an average of 13 st 0.5 lb (82.6 kg), 9 pounds (4.1 kg) per rower more than their opponents. Cambridge saw four rowers return with Boat Race experience, including their number six Brian Lloyd and stroke David Jennens. Oxford's crew contained three rowers who had taken part in the previous year's race. Five of Cambridge rowers were studying at St John's College, thus rowed for Lady Margaret Boat Club under the supervision of Meldrum. Three participants in the race were registered as non-British. Oxford's number two A. J. Smith was Australian while their cox G. Carver was American; Cambridge's Lloyd was also Australian.

Seat	Oxford			Cambridge		
Seat	Name	College	Weight	Name	College	Weight
Bow	J. F. E. Smith	New College	11 st 11 lb	H. H. Almond	Lady Margaret Boat Club	10 st 4 lb
2	A. J. Smith	Merton	12 st 11 lb	D. D. Macklin	Lady Margaret Boat Club	11 st 11 lb
3	H. J. Renton	Magdalen	13 st 1.5 lb	J. G. P. Crowden	Pembroke	12 st 7.5 lb
4	L. A. F. Stokes	New College	13 st 3 lb	R. F. A. Sharpley	Lady Margaret Boat Club	13 st 5 lb
5	M. J. Hawkes	New College	12 st 11.5 lb	E. J. Worlidge	Lady Margaret Boat Club	12 st 13.5 lb
6	C. G. Turner	New College	14 st 6 lb	C. B. M. Lloyd (P)	Lady Margaret Boat Club	12 st 12.5 lb
7	D. N. Callender	Trinity	12 st 6.5 lb	W. A. D. Windham	Christ's	12 st 12 lb
Stroke	C. G. V. Davidge (P)	Trinity	13 st 7.5 lb	D. M. Jennens	Clare	12 st 7 lb
Cox	G. Carver	Balliol	8 st 7 lb	J. F. K. Hinde	Pembroke	9 st 4 lb
Source: (P) – boat club president

== Race ==
The Championship Course along which the Boat Race is contested

Oxford won the toss and elected to start from the Surrey station, handing the Middlesex side of the river to Cambridge. Umpire Ellison started the race at 1:45 p.m, with a strong wind blowing against the tide, creating "sizeable waves". Oxford had already taken on board a considerable amount of water from their row to the stakeboats and had opted for less physical protection against the inclement conditions than their opponents. Both crews started at a relatively low stroke rate to cater for the conditions, with Cambridge moderately out-rating their opponents. The Light Blues took an early lead and appeared to be coping with the conditions better than Oxford, and were over a length ahead by the time they passed the London Rowing Club boathouse. The Dark Blues shipped more water until they became entirely submerged, and were rescued by spectators on the Oxford launch Niceia. Cambridge continued, and headed for the relative protection of the Surrey shore but were caught by the umpire's boat and informed that the race was void.

It was the first sinking in the Boat Race since the 1925 race in which Oxford went down. Since the umpire declared a "no row" and because the reason for the sinking was deemed to be "equipment failure before the end of the Fulham Wall", it was agreed between the umpire, the boat club presidents and the Port of London Authority that a re-row be arranged which would take place on Easter Monday, 26 March 1951.

After the two-day delay, Oxford once again won the toss and once again elected to start from the Surrey station, handing the Middlesex side of the river to Cambridge. Ellison started the re-row at 2:30 p.m, in light rain and a "dead smooth" river. Cambridge made the better start and although Oxford quickly drew level, the Light Blues were clear by the end of Fulham Wall. Poor steering from cox Carver allowed Cambridge to pull further ahead, passing the Mile Post more than two lengths clear, and Harrods Furniture Depository three lengths up. Jennens pushed on and by the time Cambridge passed below Hammersmith Bridge, they were four and a half lengths clear and seven ahead by Chiswick Steps. By Barnes Bridge, the lead was 11 lengths.

Cambridge won by a margin of 12 lengths in a time of 20 minutes 50 seconds, securing their fifth consecutive victory. It was the largest winning margin since the 1900 race and the slowest winning time since the 1947 race. Crowden later noted that while he believed the initially sinking to be more down to "inferior oarsmanship rather than an accident", he was certain that his crew would have failed to finish the course had they been allowed to continue. The rowing correspondent of The Manchester Guardian suggested that "the 1951 race, with anti-climax following disaster, is best forgotten as quickly as may be." The victory took the overall record in the event to 53–43 in Cambridge's favour.
