= The Boat Race 1949 =

95th Boat Race
- Date: 26 March 1949
- Winner: Cambridge
- Margin of victory: 1/4 length
- Winning time: 18 minutes 57 seconds
- Overall record (Cambridge–Oxford): 51–43
- Umpire: Guy Oliver Nickalls (Oxford)

Other races
- Women's winner: Oxford

The 95th Boat Race took place on 26 March 1949. Held annually, the Boat Race is a side-by-side rowing race between crews from the Universities of Oxford and Cambridge along the River Thames in London. The race, umpired by the former Oxford rower Guy Oliver Nickalls, was notable as the commentator for the BBC, John Snagge announced "I can't see who's in the lead, but it's either Oxford or Cambridge." Cambridge won by a quarter of a length, the narrowest margin of victory since the 1877 race, which was officially recorded as a dead heat. The victory took the overall record in the event to 51–43 in their favour.

== Background ==
The Championship Course along which the Boat Race is contested

The Boat Race is a side-by-side rowing competition between the University of Oxford (sometimes referred to as the "Dark Blues") and the University of Cambridge (sometimes referred to as the "Light Blues"). First held in 1829, the race takes place on the 4.2-mile (6.8 km) Championship Course on the River Thames in southwest London. The rivalry is a major point of honour between the two universities; it is followed throughout the United Kingdom and, as of 2014, broadcast worldwide. Cambridge went into the race as reigning champions, having won the 1948 race by five lengths, with Cambridge leading overall with 50 victories to Oxford's 43 (excluding the "dead heat" of 1877).

Cambridge were coached by R. Beesly (who had rowed for the Light Blues in the 1927, 1928 and 1929 races), W. L. S. Flemming, Mike Nicholson (non-rowing boat club president for the 1947 race), Harold Rickett (who had rowed three times between 1930 and 1932), and M. H. Warriner (a three-time Blue between 1928 and 1930). Oxford's coaches were Hugh "Jumbo" Edwards (who had rowed for Oxford in 1926 and 1930), F. E. Hellyer (who had coached Cambridge on five previous occasions), A. McCulloch (who had rowed in the 1908 race) and J. MacNabb (who had coached Cambridge between 1930 and 1932). The race was umpired by Guy Oliver Nickalls who had rowed for Oxford in the 1921, 1922 and 1923 races.

Writing in The Observer, G. I. F. Thomson noted that "neither crew contains an oarsman of any exceptional power, distinction or reputation" yet both crews had improved in form since their arrival at Putney. The rowing correspondent for The Manchester Guardian praised the quality of the final coaching on the Thames, and stated that "there has been no threat of influenza, and no last-minute change in the constitution of either crew". He went on to claim that "Oxford should win". The Times' rowing correspondent suggested that the crews were "extraordinarily evenly matched".

== Crews ==
The Cambridge crew weighed an average of 12 st 10.75 lb (80.9 kg), 2 pounds (0.9 kg) per rower more than their opponents. Oxford's crew contained five participants with prior Boat Race experience, including cox Alastair Palsgrave-Brown. Cambridge saw one rower return to the crew in number five Paul Bircher. The Light Blue's crew contained three Olympic medallists: Brian Lloyd, Bircher and Paul Massey won silver when they finished second in the men's eight at the 1948 Summer Olympics in London.

Seat	Oxford			Cambridge		
Seat	Name	College	Weight	Name	College	Weight
Bow	G. C. Fisk	Oriel	11 st 9.5 lb	G. S. S. Ludford	Jesus	11 st 2 lb
2	A. J. M. Cavenagh	Magdalen	11 st 1 lb	A. L. Macleod	Lady Margaret Boat Club	13 st 0 lb
3	W. J. H. Leckie	Brasenose	12 st 12 lb	C. B. M. Lloyd	Lady Margaret Boat Club	13 st 0 lb
4	R. L. Arundel	Merton	14 st 0 lb	J. R. la T. Corrie	1st & 3rd Trinity	13 st 3 lb
5	A. D. Rowe (P)	Trinity	12 st 11.5 lb	E. A. P. Bircher (P)	Christ's	13 st 7 lb
6	T. D. Raikes	Trinity	12 st 10.5 lb	P. M. O. Massey	Lady Margaret Boat Club	13 st 8 lb
7	J. M. Clay	Magdalen	12 st 12.5 lb	D. V. Lynch Odhams	Jesus	13 st 1 lb
Stroke	C. G. V. Davidge	Trinity	12 st 13 lb	D. M. Jennens	Clare	12 st 4.5 lb
Cox	A. Palgrave-Brown	Queen's	8 st 9 lb	T. R. Ashton	Christ's	9 st 3 lb
Source: (P) – boat club president

== Race ==
John Snagge, commentating on the radio for the BBC, announced "I can't see who's in the lead, but it's either Oxford or Cambridge."

Oxford won the toss and elected to start from the Middlesex station, handing the Surrey side of the river to Cambridge. The umpire, Nickalls, started the race at 11:30 a.m. The Dark Blues took an early lead and were half a length ahead after the first minute of the race. They were clear of Cambridge by Craven Steps, and by the time the crews passed the Mile Post, were a length ahead. In the headwind along Chiswick Reach, and with the bend in the river in their favour, Cambridge slowly redressed the balance and by Chiswick Eyot they had begun to overlap Oxford's boat.

By the bottom of Dukes Meadows, Oxford's lead was down to half a length and as Cambridge out-rated their opponents, they drew level and passed under Barnes Bridge side by side. Despite numerous spurts from Oxford's stroke Davidge, Cambridge kept in touch and "were fighting every inch of the way". Commentating for the BBC on a launch whose engine had failed, John Snagge announced "I can't see who's in the lead, but it's either Oxford or Cambridge." Both crews were rating over 33 strokes per minute as they approached the finishing post, with the Light Blues just edging ahead to win by a quarter of a length in a time of 18 minutes 57 seconds. The winning distance was the narrowest since the "dead heat" result of the 1877 Race. It was Cambridge's third consecutive victory and took the overall record in the event to 51–43 in their favour. The rowing correspondent for The Manchester Guardian suggested that this was a race that "will never be forgotten", while the correspondent for The Times claimed that "1949 must go down in Boat Race history as having provided one of the epic struggles of all time." G. I. F. Thomson, writing in The Observer, stated that "heroic determination on both sides ... produced perhaps the most exciting Boat Race of all time."
