= The Boat Race 1926 =

78th Boat Race
- Date: 27 March 1926
- Winner: Cambridge
- Margin of victory: 5 lengths
- Winning time: 19 minutes 29 seconds
- Overall record (Cambridge–Oxford): 37–40
- Umpire: Frederick I. Pitman (Cambridge)

The 78th Boat Race took place on 27 March 1926. Held annually, the Boat Race is a side-by-side rowing race between crews from the Universities of Oxford and Cambridge along the River Thames. Umpired by former rower Frederick I. Pitman, Cambridge won by five lengths in a time of 19 minutes 29 seconds in the largest winning margin since 1912. It was Cambridge's third consecutive victory and took the overall record in the event to 40–37 in Oxford's favour.

== Background ==
William Dudley Ward coached the Light Blues for the 1926 Boat Race.

The Boat Race is a side-by-side rowing competition between the University of Oxford (sometimes referred to as the "Dark Blues") and the University of Cambridge (sometimes referred to as the "Light Blues"). The race was first held in 1829, and since 1845 has taken place on the 4.2-mile (6.8 km) Championship Course on the River Thames in southwest London. The rivalry is a major point of honour between the two universities and followed throughout the United Kingdom and worldwide. Cambridge went into the race as reigning champions, having won the 1925 race as Oxford became waterlogged, with Oxford leading overall with 40 victories to Cambridge's 36 (excluding the "dead heat" of 1877).

Oxford's coaches were H. R. Baker (who rowed for the Dark Blues in the 1908 and 1909 races), G. C. Bourne who had rowed for the university in the 1882 and 1883 races, and A. V. Douglas (who took part in the 1922 and 1925 races). Cambridge were coached by William Dudley Ward (who had rowed in 1897, 1899 and 1900 races), Francis Escombe, David Alexander Wauchope (who had rowed in the 1895 race), and H. W. Willis. For the eighteenth and final year the umpire was Old Etonian Frederick I. Pitman who had rowed for Cambridge in the 1884, 1885 and 1886 races. He would be replaced in the following year's race by Charles Burnell.

Cambridge opted to arrive a fortnight later than usual at the Thames, and forwent their typical practice at Ely. According to former Oxford rower and author George Drinkwater, the Light Blues "showed great promise" only to be struck by measles, forcing a late replacement in the boat. Oxford, while "not so pleasing in appearance" were considered to be favourites for the race.

== Crews ==
The Oxford crew weighed an average of 12 st 10.5 lb (80.8 kg), 6.75 pounds (3.1 kg) per rower more than their opponents. Four of the Cambridge crew had taken part in the Boat Race previously, including W. F. Smith, G. H. Ambler, and cox J. A. Brown, all of whom were participating in their third consecutive event. The crew also included E. C. Hamilton-Russell who had won three finals at the 1925 Henley Royal Regatta. Oxford saw three rowers return to the boat in J. D. W. Thomson, E. C. T. Edwards and C. E. Pitman. Cambridge's Australian number six J. B. Bell was the only non-British participant registered in the race.

Seat	Oxford			Cambridge		
Seat	Name	College	Weight	Name	College	Weight
Bow	P. W. Murray-Threipland	Christ Church	12 st 5 lb	M. F. A. Keen	Lady Margaret Boat Club	11 st 9 lb
2	T. W. Shaw	Christ Church	12 st 7.5 lb	W. F. Smith	1st Trinity	11 st 8 lb
3	G. H. Crawford	Brasenose	13 st 0 lb	G. H. Ambler (P)	Clare	12 st 5 lb
4	W. Rathbone	Christ Church	13 st 9 lb	B. T. Craggs	Lady Margaret Boat Club	11 st 13 lb
5	H. R. A. Edwards	Christ Church	13 st 5 lb	L. V. Bevan	Lady Margaret Boat Club	13 st 9 lb
6	J. D. W. Thomson	University	13 st 5.5 lb	J. B. Bell	Jesus	13 st 2 lb
7	E. C. T. Edwards	Christ Church	12 st 9 lb	S. K. Tubbs	Gonville and Caius	12 st 4 lb
Stroke	C. E. Pitman (P)	Christ Church	11 st 1 lb	E. C. Hamilton-Russell	3rd Trinity	11 st 8 lb
Cox	Sir J. H. Croft	Brasenose	8 st 2 lb	J. A. Brown	Gonville and Caius	8 st 6.5 lb
Source: (P) – boat club president

== Race ==
The Championship Course along which the Boat Race is contested

Oxford won the toss and elected to start from the Surrey station, handing the Middlesex side of the river to Cambridge. In conditions described by Drinkwater as "excellent" with "smooth water but only a moderate tide", Pitman started the race at 12:27 pm. Although Oxford marginally out-rated their opponents, the crews were level after the first minute. As the crews passed the Mile Post, the Dark Blues held a small lead which they had extended to around half a length by Harrods Furniture Depository. Cambridge made a push and reduced the deficit to a quarter-length by the time the boats passed below Hammersmith Bridge. Following a series of spurts around the outside of the bend in the river, Cambridge gained to draw level by HMS Stork.

The Dark Blues' rhythm faltered and their number five missed a stroke as they passed Chiswick Eyot, allowing Cambridge to move away to take a clear lead. Two lengths ahead by Chiswick Steps, the Light Blues increased their stroke rate and pulled further away to win by five lengths, the largest winning margin since the 1912 race, in a time of 19 minutes and 29 seconds. It was their third consecutive victory and their seventh in eight races.
