= The Boat Race 1931 =

83rd Boat Race
- Date: 21 March 1931
- Winner: Cambridge
- Margin of victory: 2 1/2 lengths
- Winning time: 19 minutes 26 seconds
- Overall record (Cambridge–Oxford): 42–40
- Umpire: John Houghton Gibbon (Cambridge)

The 83rd Boat Race took place on 21 March 1931. Held annually, the Boat Race is a side-by-side rowing race between crews from the Universities of Oxford and Cambridge along the River Thames. In a race umpired by the former rower John Houghton Gibbon, Cambridge won by two and a half lengths in a time of 19 minutes 26 seconds. The victory took the overall record to 42–40 in their favour. It was the first race for which John Snagge provided a radio commentary for the BBC.

== Background ==
John Snagge provided radio commentary for the race on the BBC.

The Boat Race is a side-by-side rowing competition between the University of Oxford (sometimes referred to as the "Dark Blues") and the University of Cambridge (sometimes referred to as the "Light Blues"). The race was first held in 1829, and since 1845 has taken place on the 4.2-mile (6.8 km) Championship Course on the River Thames in southwest London. The rivalry is a major point of honour between the two universities; it is followed throughout the United Kingdom and, as of 2014, broadcast worldwide. Cambridge went into the race as reigning champions, having won the 1930 race by two lengths, and led overall with 41 victories to Oxford's 40 (excluding the "dead heat" of 1877).

Cambridge were coached by R. W. M. Arbuthnot (who had rowed for Cambridge four times between 1909 and 1912), J. A. MacNabb (who had rowed in the 1924 race) and P. H. Thomas (a four-time Blue between 1902 and 1905). Oxford's coaches were A. V. Campbell (who took part in the 1922 and 1925 races), Stanley Garton (who had rowed three times between 1909 and 1911) and P. C. Mallam (a Dark Blue from 1921 to 1924 inclusive). The race was umpired by former Cambridge rower John Houghton Gibbon who had participated in the 1899 and 1900 races.

The rowing correspondent for The Times stated that the crews were "well-matched", while The Manchester Guardian's correspondent predicted a "gruelling struggle". It was the first time John Snagge provided a radio commentary for the BBC. He would go on to commentate for the corporation every year up to and including the 1980 race.

== Crews ==
The Cambridge crew weighed an average of 12 st 4.625 lb (78.1 kg), 1.125 pounds (0.5 kg) per rower more than their opponents. Oxford saw three rowers return to their crew with Boat Race experience, including D. E. Tinne who was making his third consecutive appearance. Cambridge's crew included five rowers who had participated in the event prior to this year, including their stroke T. A. Brocklebank who was also rowing for the third year in a row. All of the participants in the race were registered as British.

Seat	Oxford			Cambridge		
Seat	Name	College	Weight	Name	College	Weight
Bow	W. L. Garstang	Trinity	11 st 2 lb	D. Haig-Thomas	Lady Margaret Boat Club	11 st 4.5 lb
2	G. M. L. Smith	Brasenose	11 st 11 lb	W. A. Prideaux	3rd Trinity	12 st 6 lb
3	D. E. Tinne (P)	University	12 st 4 lb	R. H. H. Symonds	Lady Margaret Boat Club	11 st 12.5 lb
4	C. M. Johnston	Brasenose	12 st 9 lb	G. Gray	Queens'	13 st 5 lb
5	R. A. J. Poole	Brasenose	13 st 2 lb	P. N. Carpmael	Jesus	13 st 0 lb
6	L. Clive	Christ Church	13 st 2.5 lb	H. R. N. Rickett	3rd Trinity	12 st 10 lb
7	W. D. C. Erskine-Crum	Christ Church	12 st 1.5 lb	C. J. S. Sergel	Clare	12 st 7 lb
Stroke	R. W. G. Holdsworth	Brasenose	11 st 10.5 lb	T. A. Brocklebank (P)	3rd Trinity	11 st 6 lb
Cox	E. R. Edmett	Worcester	8 st 7 lb	J. M. Ranking	Pembroke	6 st 13 lb
Source: (P) – boat club president

== Race ==
The Championship Course along which the Boat Race is contested

Oxford won the toss and elected to start from the Middlesex station, handing the Surrey side of the river to Cambridge. In wind gusting from the south-west, the umpire Gibbons started the race. Cambridge took an early lead, although they were out-rated by the Dark Blues. The boats were close, with oars nearly touching, for the first two minutes of the race, before the Light Blue cox steered to avoid a collision. By the end of Fulham Wall, Cambridge held a half-length lead although Oxford kept in touch, and even reduced the deficit to a quarter of a length by the time the crews passed the Mile Post.

By the Crab Tree pub, Cambridge's stroke Brocklebank made his first push for ten strokes to which Oxford responded in kind. A second push from the Light Blues however saw them pull away and lead by one and a quarter lengths as they passed below Hammersmith Bridge. As both crews encountered a headwind, they dropped to 29 strokes per minute, but their styles were markedly different: Cambridge were lively while Oxford laboured. By Chiswick Steps the lead was two and a half lengths and three by Barnes Bridge. The Dark Blues pushed hard in the final stretches and slowly reduced Cambridge's lead until Brocklebank put one final spurt in at Mortlake Brewery to secure the victory.

Cambridge won by two and a half lengths in a time of 19 minutes 26 seconds, their eighth consecutive win in the event and the narrowest margin of victory since the 1923 race. The win took the overall record in the event to 42–40 in their favour.
