= Harry Almond =

British rower

Personal information
- Nationality: British
- Born: 10 April 1928; Blackpool, England
- Died: 7 October 2004 (aged 76); Oxford, England

Sport
- Sport: Rowing

Harry Almond (10 April 1928 – 17 October 2004) was a British rower. He competed in the men's coxless four event at the 1952 Summer Olympics.
