= The Boat Race 1932 =

84th Boat Race
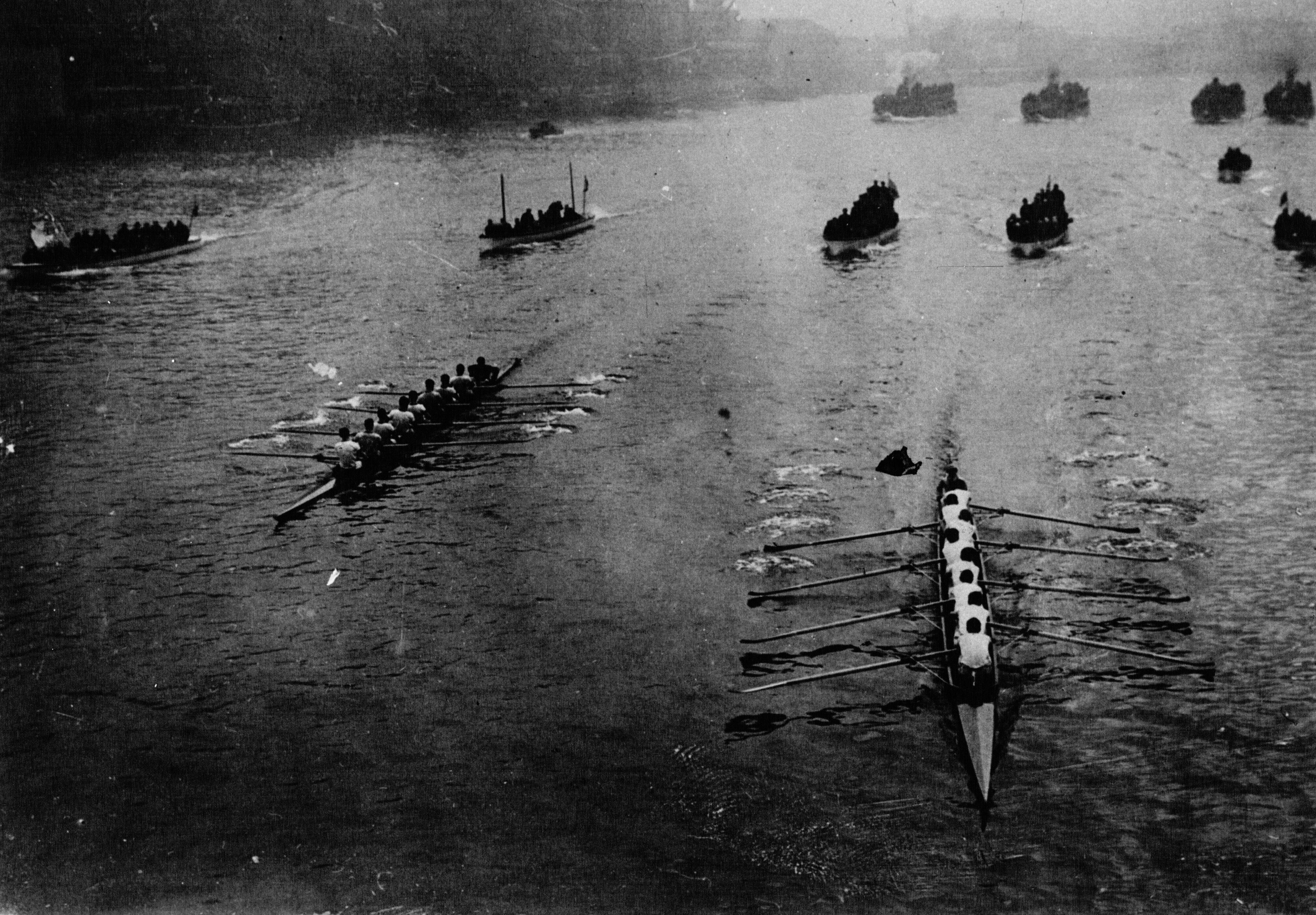
- Date: 19 March 1932
- Winner: Cambridge
- Margin of victory: 5 lengths
- Winning time: 19 minutes 11 seconds
- Overall record (Cambridge–Oxford): 43–40
- Umpire: Harcourt Gilbey Gold (Oxford)

The 84th Boat Race took place on 19 March 1932. Held annually, the Boat Race is a side-by-side rowing race between crews from the Universities of Oxford and Cambridge along the River Thames. The race was umpired by former Oxford rower Harcourt Gilbey Gold on a shortened because of repairs to Putney Bridge. Cambridge won by five lengths, the largest winning margin for three years, in a time of 19 minutes 11 seconds, their ninth consecutive victory. The win equalled the record victorious streaks of Oxford between 1861 and 1869, and 1890 and 1898, and took the overall record to 43–40 in their favour.

== Background ==
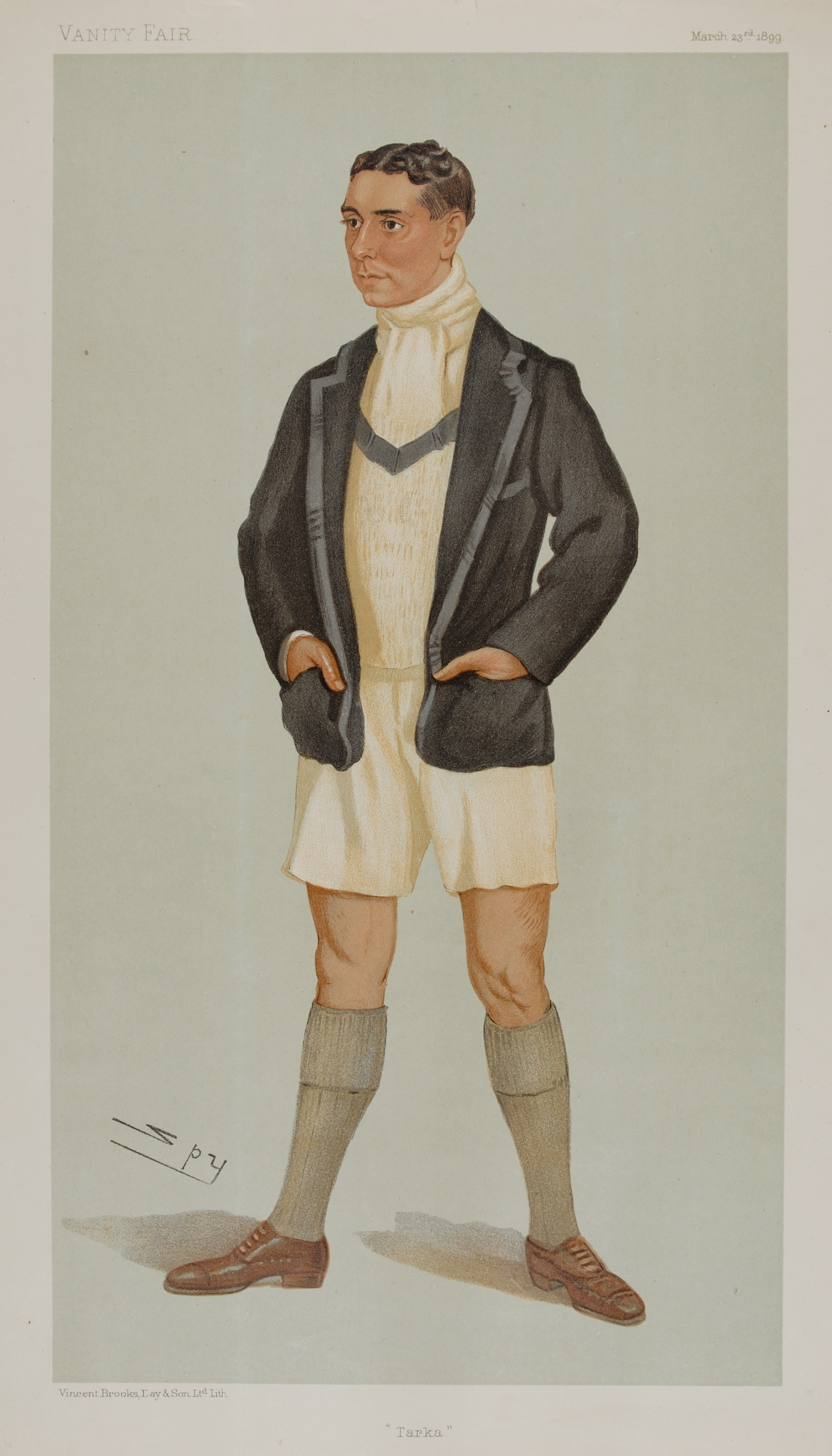
Harcourt Gilbey Gold, former Dark Blue president for the 1900 race and four-time Blue umpired the race.

The Boat Race is a side-by-side rowing competition between the University of Oxford (sometimes referred to as the "Dark Blues") and the University of Cambridge (sometimes referred to as the "Light Blues"). The race was first held in 1829, and since 1845 has taken place on the 4.2-mile (6.8 km) Championship Course on the River Thames in southwest London. The rivalry is a major point of honour between the two universities; it is followed throughout the United Kingdom and, as of 2014, broadcast worldwide. Cambridge went into the race as reigning champions, having won the 1931 race by 2 1/2 lengths, and led overall with 42 victories to Oxford's 40 (excluding the "dead heat" of 1877).

Oxford were coached by H. R. Barker (who rowed for the Dark Blues in the 1908 and 1909 races) and John Houghton Gibbon (who had participated in the 1899 and 1900 races, and umpired the previous year's race). Cambridge's coaches were F. E. Hellyer (who had rowed for the Light Blues in the 1910 and 1911 races), J. A. MacNabb (rowed in the 1924 race) and Peter Haig-Thomas (four-time Blue for Cambridge between 1902 and 1905). The race was umpired by Harcourt Gilbey Gold, former Dark Blue president for the 1900 race and four-time Blue, rowing in each race between 1896 and 1899.

The start of this year's race was moved to the University of London Boat Club, approximately 400 yards (370 m) further upstream. After discussion between the umpire, the two boat club presidents, the coaches Haig-Thomas and Gibbon, and a representative of the Port of London Authority, the course was shortened to avoid potential eddies around temporary buttresses erected by Putney Bridge which was undergoing repair. As noted by former Oxford rower E. P. Evans, writing in The Manchester Guardian, "no comparisons of times with previous races can be made, because the points on the course will be different". It was the first time since the 1863 race that the event was not conducted between the University Stone and Mortlake.

Cambridge were considered to be favourites to win the race: according to Evans, they had "a command of their boat" although Oxford had "acquired more 'drive' from the coaching of Colonel J. H. Gibbon". The rowing correspondent for The Times stated that the Cambridge crew were "the steadiest and best combined crew since that of 1924", while Oxford were "not remarkable for good form" and "not very well together in their blade nor very long nor very steady."

== Crews ==
The Cambridge crew weighed an average of 12 st 2.75 lb (77.3 kg), 3.5 pounds (1.6 kg) per rower more than their opponents. Oxford saw four rowers return to the crew with Boat Race experience. Cambridge's crew also contained four participants who had taken part in the event previously, including bow David Haig-Thomas and number six Harold Rickett. Two participants in the race were registered as non-British, both of whom rowed for Cambridge: Lewis Luxton and William Sambell were Australian.

Seat	Oxford			Cambridge		
Seat	Name	College	Weight	Name	College	Weight
Bow	G. A. Ellison	New College	11 st 8.5 lb	D. Haig-Thomas	Lady Margaret Boat Club	11 st 6 lb
2	G. M. L. Smith	Brasenose	11 st 9 lb	K. M. Payne	3rd Trinity	12 st 5 lb
3	J. de R. Kent	Brasenose	11 st 8.5 lb	T. G. Askwith	Peterhouse	11 st 8.5 lb
4	C. M. Johnston (P)	Brasenose	12 st 4.5 lb	W. A. T. Sambell	Pembroke	12 st 6.5 lb
5	W. D. C. Erskine-Crum	Christ Church	12 st 6 lb	C. J. S. Sergel	Clare	12 st 9 lb
6	R. A. J. Poole	Brasenose	13 st 2.5 lb	H. R. N. Rickett (P)	3rd Trinity	12 st 11.5 lb
7	W. H. Migotti	Worcester	11 st 5.5 lb	D. H. E. McCowen	Pembroke	12 st 1.5 lb
Stroke	C. A. Chadwyck-Healey	Trinity	11 st 6.25 lb	L. Luxton	Pembroke	12 st 2.25 lb
Cox	E. R. Edmett	Worcester	8 st 7 lb	J. M. Ranking	Pembroke	6 st 13 lb
Source: (P) – boat club president

== Race ==
The Championship Course along which the Boat Race is contested

Cambridge won the toss and elected to start from the Surrey station, handing the Middlesex side of the river to Oxford. Weather conditions were favourable, with bright sunshine, little wind and calm water, and umpire Gold started the race at 10:30 a.m. Oxford made the quicker start, marginally out-rating the Light Blues and led by a quarter-length by the end of the Fulham Wall. They extended this lead to one third of a length by the time the crews passed the Mile Post. Cambridge increased their stroke rate and drew level by the Crab Tree pub, and spurting at Harrods Furniture Depository they led by half a length.

As the crews passed below Hammersmith Bridge, Cambridge drew clear and held a two-length lead by the Doves pub. In rough water along Chiswick Reach, Oxford struggled and at Chiswick Steps they were eleven seconds behind the Light Blues. Despite a spurt from the Dark Blues, Cambridge passed under Barnes Bridge five lengths ahead. They held that lead to pass the finishing post in a time of 19 minutes 11 seconds, the largest winning margin since the 1929 race. It was their ninth consecutive victory and the first time in the history of the race that Cambridge had equalled the successful winning streaks of Oxford between 1861 and 1869, and 1890 and 1898.
