= The Boat Race 1930 =

82nd Boat Race
- Date: 12 April 1930
- Winner: Cambridge
- Margin of victory: 2 lengths
- Winning time: 19 minutes 9 seconds
- Overall record (Cambridge–Oxford): 41–40
- Umpire: Charles Burnell (Oxford)

Other races
- Women's winner: Cambridge

The 82nd Boat Race took place on 12 April 1930. Held annually, the Boat Race is a side-by-side rowing race between crews from the Universities of Oxford and Cambridge along the River Thames. In a race umpired by former Oxford rower Charles Burnell, Cambridge won by two lengths in a time of 19 minutes 9 seconds. Their seventh consecutive victory, it took the overall record to 41–40 in their favour, the first time for 68 years that they held the lead in the event.

== Background ==
The Boat Race is a side-by-side rowing competition between the University of Oxford (sometimes referred to as the "Dark Blues") and the University of Cambridge (sometimes referred to as the "Light Blues"). The race was first held in 1829, and since 1845 has taken place on the 4.2-mile (6.8 km) Championship Course on the River Thames in southwest London. The rivalry is a major point of honour between the two universities; it is followed throughout the United Kingdom and, as of 2014, broadcast worldwide. Cambridge went into the race as reigning champions, having won the 1929 race by ten lengths, with the overall record tied on 40 victories each (excluding the "dead heat" of 1877).

Cambridge were coached by Francis Escombe, J. C. Holcroft, J. A. MacNabb (who had rowed in the 1924 race) and P. H. Thomas (a four-time Blue between 1902 and 1905). Oxford's coaches were Stanley Garton (who had rowed three times between 1909 and 1911), P. C. Mallam (a Dark Blue from 1921 to 1924 inclusive) and Arthur Wiggins (who had rowed for Oxford in the 1912, 1913 and 1914 races). For the fourth consecutive year the umpire was Charles Burnell who had rowed for Oxford in the 1895, 1896, 1897 and 1898 races. Charles Kent, who rowed for Oxford in the 1891 race, was the finishing judge for the third consecutive year.

According to the rowing correspondent for The Times, the "Cambridge Trial Eights ... were certainly not comparable with those of the past four years." Conversely, Oxford "had better Trial Eights than for many years past". They performed well in their practice rows during the build-up to the race: they broke the record to the Mile Post by four seconds. Cambridge were considered "slightly the faster" but Oxford were "coming on". Both crews rowed in boats built by Sims brothers of Putney, and used Aylings oars.

== Crews ==
The Cambridge crew weighed an average of 12 st 8 lb (79.6 kg), 1.5 pounds (0.7 kg) per rower more than their opponents. Oxford saw two rowers return in Hugh Edwards and D. E. Tinne. Cambridge's boat contained three participants with Boat Race experience, including Olympic gold medallist Michael Warriner and J. B. Collins, both of whom were making their third consecutive appearance. Just one participant in the race was registered as non-British in Cambridge's cox, the American Robert Egerton Swartwout.

Seat	Oxford			Cambridge		
Seat	Name	College	Weight	Name	College	Weight
Bow	M. J. Waterhouse	Balliol	12 st 8 lb	D. Haig-Thomas	Lady Margaret Boat Club	11 st 4 lb
2	R. V. Low	University	12 st 2.5 lb	H. R. N. Rickett	3rd Trinity	12 st 6 lb
3	N. K. Hutton	University	12 st 11 lb	W. A. Prideaux	3rd Trinity	12 st 6 lb
4	C. M. Johnston	Brasenose	12 st 11 lb	P. N. Carpmael	Jesus	12 st 7 lb
5	H. R. A. Edwards	Christ Church	13 st 10 lb	M. H. Warriner (P)	1st Trinity	13 st 10 lb
6	L. Clive	Christ Church	13 st 0.5 lb	J. B. Collins	3rd Trinity	14 st 5 lb
7	D. E. Tinne	University	12 st 1 lb	A. S. Reeve	Selwyn	12 st 1 lb
Stroke	C. F. Martineau	University	10 st 13 lb	T. A. Brocklebank	3rd Trinity	11 st 11.5 lb
Cox	H. A. G. Durbridge	University	8 st 7 lb	R. E. Swartwout	1st Trinity	7 st 8 lb
Source: (P) – boat club president A. Graham acted as the non-rowing president for Oxford.

== Race ==
The Championship Course along which the Boat Race is contested

Oxford won the toss and elected to start from the Surrey station, handing the Middlesex side of the river to Cambridge. In an "unpleasant drizzle", the umpire Burnell started the race at 12:30 p.m. The Light Blues made a "smoother start" but were marginally out-rated by Oxford who held a one-third length lead after a minute. They extended their lead to two-thirds of a length by Craven Steps but the bend in the river favoured Cambridge, and their lead was halved. By the Mile Post, the Dark Blues led by the length of a canvas.

Oxford's stroke Martineau responded to a push from Cambridge and were nearly a length ahead as both crews passed the Harrods Furniture Depository. Another spurt from the Light Blues saw the lead reduced to one-third of a length by the time the crews passed below Hammersmith Bridge in a record time. Reducing the stroke rate to cope with the rough water, Oxford had increased their lead to three-quarters of a length by Chiswick Eyot, yet were back to a half-length lead by Chiswick Steps as the Light Blues coped better in the conditions. Along Duke's Meadows Cambridge closed the gap and "the crews raced stroke for stroke", with the Light Blues taking the lead. The crews passed below Barnes Bridge with Cambridge holding a length's advantage and out-rated their opponents, who kept rowing to the end. Cambridge won by two lengths in a time of 19 minutes 9 seconds, their seventh consecutive victory and the eleventh in the previous twelve years. It was the fastest winning time since the 1924 race, and the fifth-fastest time in the history of the event.

The rowing correspondent for The Times suggested that "this year was one of the exceptional years by which the vast crowds who swarm on the towpath are more than rewarded for the years of waiting, and moreover Cambridge men as well as Oxford will rejoice to see so fine a courage and skill once more animating a losing crew". During the course of the race, a spectator boat became waterlogged, resulting in eight people being taken to hospital.
