= Chiswick Eyot =

Island in the River Thames, England

Coordinates: 51°29′15″N 0°14′45″W

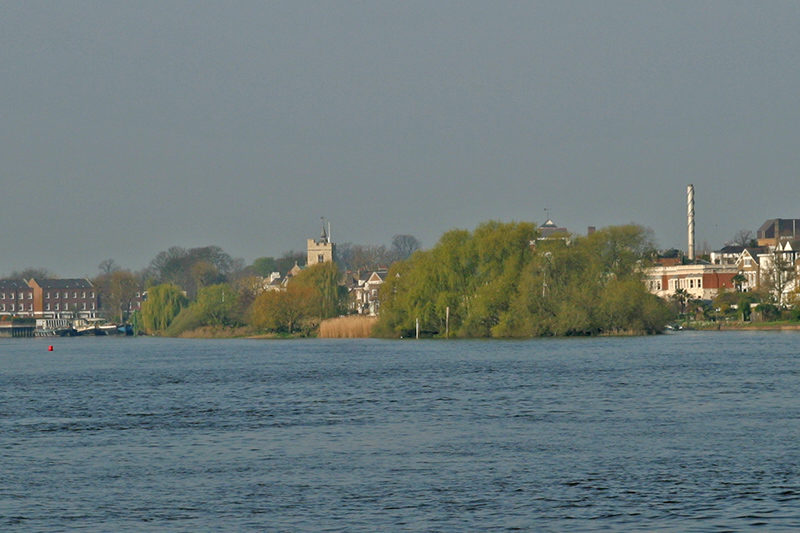
Chiswick Eyot with St Nicholas Church, buildings along Chiswick Mall and Fuller's Brewery in the background

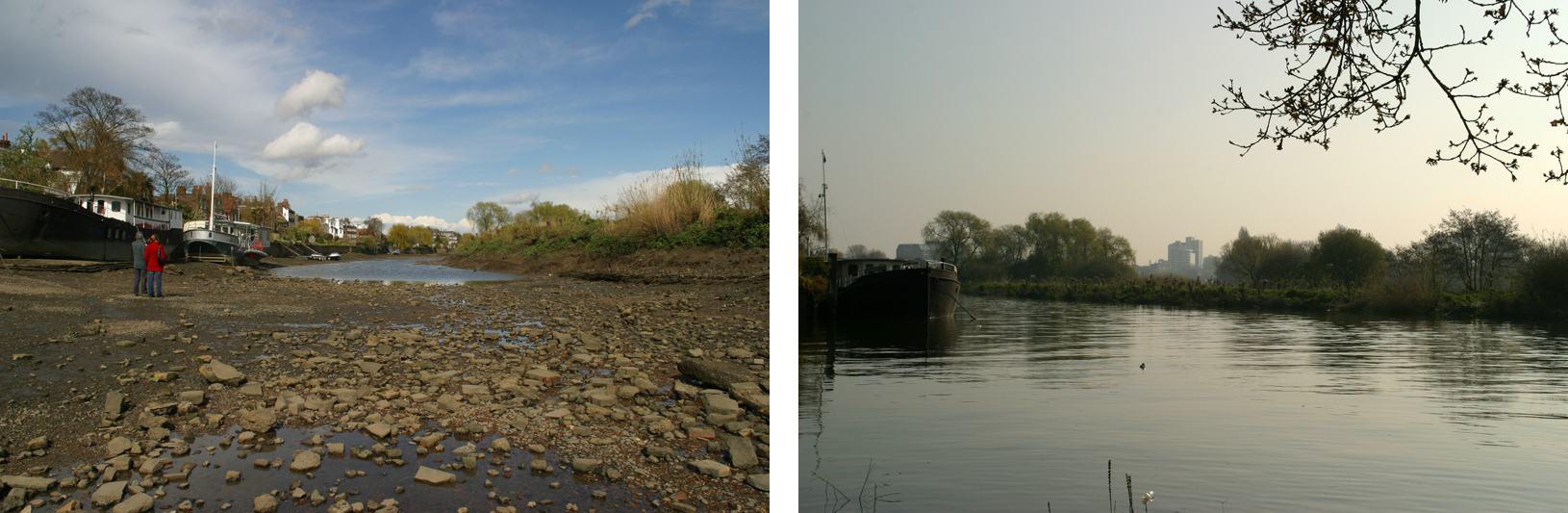
Channel between Chiswick Eyot and Chiswick Mall on the River Thames London, looking downstream at low tide (left) and high tide (right)

Chiswick Eyot /ˈtʃɪzɪk ˈeɪt/ is a 3.266-acre (1.3 ha) narrow, uninhabited ait (river island) of the Thames. It is a tree- and reed-covered rise on the Tideway by Chiswick, in London, England and is overlooked by Chiswick Mall and by some of the Barnes riverside on the far bank.

== Position ==
Chiswick Eyot lies beside The Championship Course and marks the approximate half-way point of The Boat Races (OUBC versus CUBC Men's and Women's first eights (1st 8+s) races) and the country's international Head of the River Race among others. A green pole stands on one end used for timings by rowers of that course, at the southwest, church end of the island. It is the most downstream island purely in the Thames, since Canvey Island and two nearby islets in the lower estuary are co-fed by creeks, while the Isle of Sheppey is skirted by much flow from the River Medway.

Small craft can pass between Chiswick Eyot and Chiswick Mall on the north bank for about two hours at high tide, but the small channel is generally impassable. At low tide it is possible to walk to the tidal island, though this is discouraged, both because it is now a nature reserve, and to avoid the risk of being cut off by rising water. Visitors can readily be trapped as the shape of the river causes the tide to rise locally twice as rapidly as it falls, while the tidal range is large, at over 5.5 metres (18 ft).

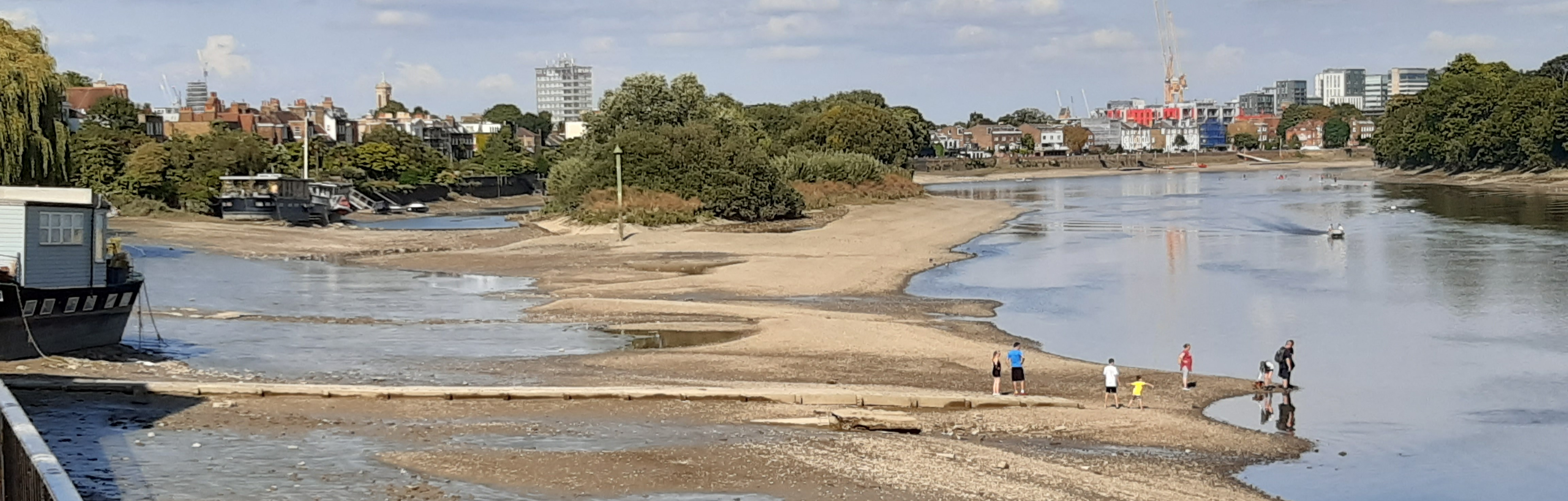
Chiswick Eyot at low tide, looking downstream from Corney Reach

== History ==
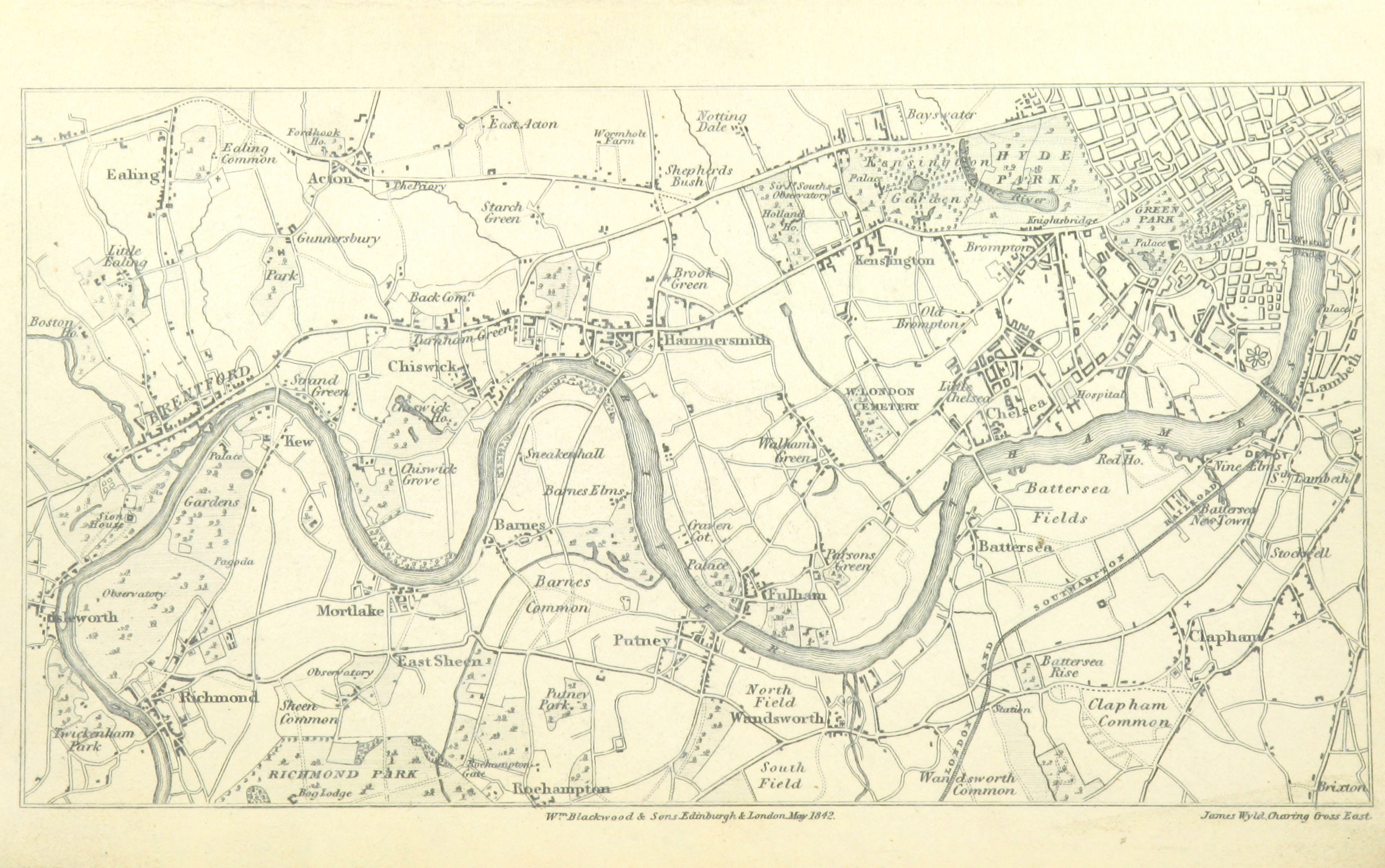
The island shown in 1842; as shown in later maps, it has been slightly eroded in places.

Chiswick Eyot is one of 43 unbridged tidal islands which can be walked to from the mainland of Great Britain. The 3.266-acre (1.3 ha) eyot was long-owned by the rectory of Chiswick and its natural successors the Ecclesiastical Commissioners until 1934 when ownership passed to the local council. Little is known of its archaeology. St. Nicholas Church, Chiswick, whose tower was built in the 15th century, is 200 metres (yards) west of the island. Thus an early medieval parish church is beside it as with Isleworth Ait, Eel Pie Island (Twickenham Ait) and others upstream.

The eyot was used during the Industrial Revolution mostly for the growing of grass and osiers (basket willows, used for basketry, furniture, cart-making, as well as cattle fodder). Its south-west end, opposite end and east has become indented. The island is partially submerged (excluding trees) by the highest tides.

The naturalist C. J. Cornish wrote in 1902 that the river bank of Chiswick Mall beside the eyot had once been a "famous fishery"; he recorded that "perhaps the last" salmon was caught between the eyot and Putney in 1812, and expressed the hope that if the "purification" of the river continued, the salmon might return. He noted that people had "taken" the wild irises from the eyot, but that marsh marigold, camomile, comfrey, ragged robin, buttercups and many composites still grew there.

== Local nature reserve ==
The London Borough of Hounslow declared the island a local nature reserve of Greater London in 1993.

== See also ==
- Islands in the River Thames

== Notes ==
Next island upstream	River Thames	Next island downstream
Oliver's Island	Chiswick Eyot	Lower Horse Island
