= The Boat Race 1877 =

1877 boat race between Oxford and Cambridge universities

34th Boat Race
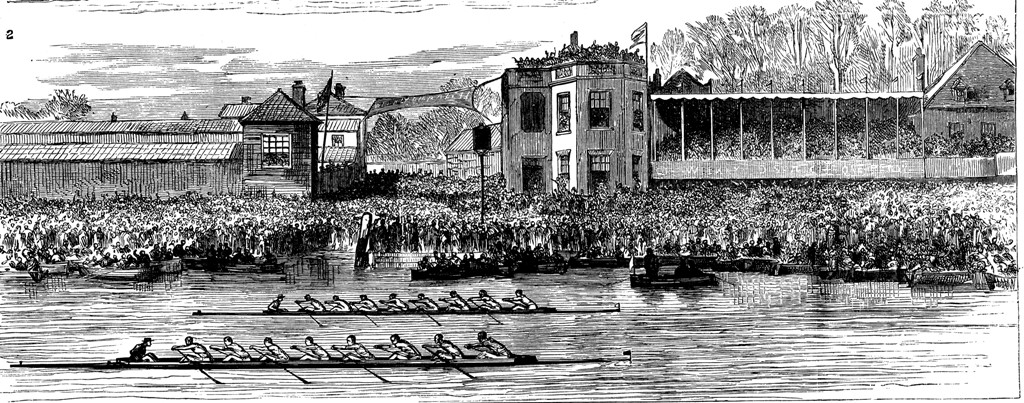
- A depiction of the finish of the 1877 University Boat Race
- Date: 24 March 1877
- Winner: No winner
- Margin of victory: Dead heat
- Winning time: 24 minutes 8 seconds
- Overall record (Cambridge–Oxford): 16–17
- Umpire: Joseph William Chitty (Oxford)

The 34th Boat Race took place on 24 March 1877. The Boat Race is an annual side-by-side rowing race between crews from the Universities of Oxford and Cambridge along the River Thames. The race ended in a dead heat, the only time the event has ended in such a fashion. Despite the formal declaration of a tie, Oxford believed that they were the victors. The controversy surrounding the result led to significant changes to the way in which the race was conducted including the introduction of finishing posts and former Blues as umpires.

== Background ==
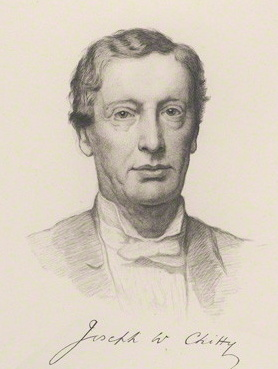
Former Oxford rower Joseph William Chitty umpired the race.

The Boat Race is a side-by-side rowing competition between the University of Oxford (sometimes referred to as the "Dark Blues") and the University of Cambridge (sometimes referred to as the "Light Blues"). The race was first held in 1829, and since 1845 has taken place on the 4.2-mile (6.8 km) Championship Course on the River Thames in southwest London. The rivalry is a major point of honour between the two universities; it is followed throughout the United Kingdom and, as of 2014, broadcast worldwide. Cambridge went into the race as reigning champions, having beaten Oxford "easily" in the previous year's race. However Oxford held the overall lead, with 17 victories to Cambridge's 16.

Oxford were coached by Reverend William Sherwood (who rowed for Oxford in the 1873 and 1874 races) and Edmund Warre (who represented the Dark Blues in the 1857 and the 1858 races). Cambridge's coach was James Brooks Close (who rowed for the Light Blues in the 1872, 1873 and 1874 races). Cambridge had practised at Putney a fortnight before the race and were initially the bookmaker's clear favourites. Oxford's practice rows a week later impressed and brought them back into contention.

The race was umpired by Joseph William Chitty who had rowed for Oxford twice in 1849 (in the March and December races) and the 1852 race, while the starter was Edward Searle. Chitty was assisted by "Honest" John Phelps who acted as the finishing judge. Phelps, a professional waterman, was over 70 years old and reportedly blind in one eye.

== Crews ==
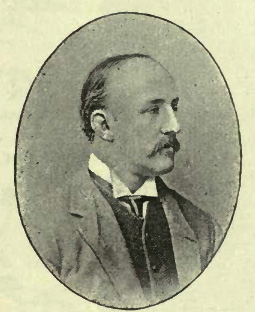
Charles Gurdon rowed at number six for Cambridge.

The Oxford crew weighed an average of 12 st 3.875 lb (77.8 kg), 4.125 pounds (1.9 kg) more than their opponents. The Cambridge crew featured seven former Blues, including the cox George Latham Davies and number four William Brooks Close, both of whom were participating in their third Boat Races. Oxford saw four Blues return: J. M. Boustead, Tom Edwards-Moss and H. J. Stayner and H. P. Marriott, all of whom had rowed in the previous two races.

Seat	Oxford			Cambridge		
Seat	Name	College	Weight	Name	College	Weight
Bow	D. J. Cowles	St John's	11 st 2.5 lb	B. G. Hoskyns	Jesus	10 st 11 lb
2	J. M. Boustead	University	12 st 8 lb	T. W. Lewis (P)	Gonville & Caius	11 st 9 lb
3	H. Pelham	Magdalen	12 st 7 lb	J. C. Fenn	1st Trinity	11 st 7 lb
4	W. H. Grenfell	Balliol	12 st 10 lb	W. B. Close	1st Trinity	11 st 9.5 lb
5	H. J. Stayner	St John's	12 st 3.75 lb	L. G. Pike	Gonville & Caius	12 st 8 lb
6	Hon. A. J. Mullholland	Balliol	12 st 5.75 lb	C. Gurdon	Jesus	12 st 13 lb
7	T. C. Edwards-Moss (P)	Brasenose	12 st 1 lb	T. E. Hockin	Jesus	12 st 11 lb
Stroke	H. P. Marriott	Brasenose	11 st 13 lb	C. D. Shafto	Jesus	12 st 0 lb
Cox	F. M. Beaumont	New College	6 st 6.5 lb	G. L. Davis	Clare	7 st 2 lb
Source: (P) – boat club president

== Race ==
The Championship Course, along which the race is conducted

The race started on Saturday 24 March 1877 at 8:27 a.m. Oxford had won the toss and elected to start from the Middlesex station, handing the Surrey side of the river to Cambridge. The Dark Blues took an early lead and were ahead at the Mile Post, but by the Crab Tree pub, the crews were level. Cambridge pulled ahead and held a quarter-of-a-length lead by Hammersmith Bridge which they extended until the crews arrived at Chiswick Reach where Oxford re-took the lead. At Chiswick Steps the Dark Blues were leading by half-a-length, and by Barnes Bridge they were clear. Experiencing strong head winds and rough water, Cowles, the Oxford bow man, suffered serious damage to his oar, nullifying further contribution to the race. Described by an Oxford undergraduate watching the race: "suddenly Oxford staggered and stood still in a mass of foam: the bow-oar, Cowles, had struck the top of a big wave in feathering and broken his blade clean off." Almost immediately, Cambridge took the advantage, but were held off by a determined Oxford crew who "spurted magnificently and drew up steadily inch by inch, so that it was a near thing as they passed the post".

== Reaction ==
In the Official Centenary History it was noted that "it is too perhaps too much to expect, even from the stoical discipline of old Blues, a unanimous acquiescence in a verdict of "dead-heat," for no conclusion could be more unsatisfactory to the competitors themselves." Oxford firmly believed that they had won the race by feet, but following a subsequent meeting in a law court with representatives of both universities and the umpire Chitty, the official result was declared as "Dead Heat", although contemporary accounts claim Phelps himself called it a "dead-heat to Oxford by 5 feet". Punch declared "Oxford won, Cambridge too." W. W. Rouse Ball, a fellow of Trinity College, Cambridge, writing in A History of The First Trinity Boat Club suggested that the broken oar was the deciding factor: "... but for this Oxford would have won." A correspondent writing in The Sydney Mail said both teams should "consider themselves lucky" that they did not lose, and speculated that the race would be looked back as "the great gooseberry" year.

== Legacy ==
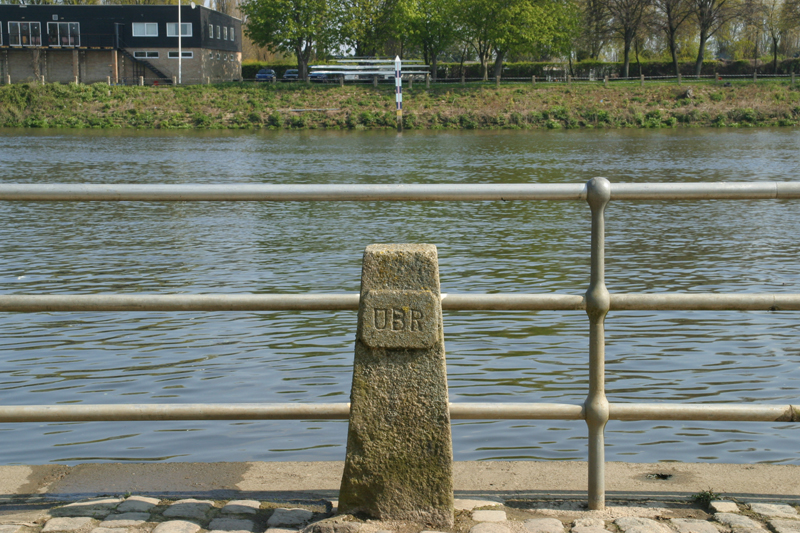
The finishing posts, "U.B.R." representing "University Boat Race"

This was the last year that the result was judged by a professional waterman and the controversy resulted in the introduction of the finishing posts. They remain, as of 2014, 113 metres (371 ft) downstream of Chiswick Bridge and are engraved with "UBR" for University Boat Race. The controversy also led to the selection of a former Blue as the umpire, selected by one university from a shortlist drawn up from the other, and alternating each year.

Phelps himself was replaced as finishing judge by E. H. Fairre. Phelps died on 5 December 1890. His great-great-great-great-nephew Richard Phelps umpired the 2014 race which also ended controversially: Cambridge lost five strokes after a clash of oars, Oxford won by 11 lengths (the biggest margin for more than 40 years) and Phelps declined an appeal from the Light Blues for a re-row.
