= Stroke (position) =

Position on a boat in rowing

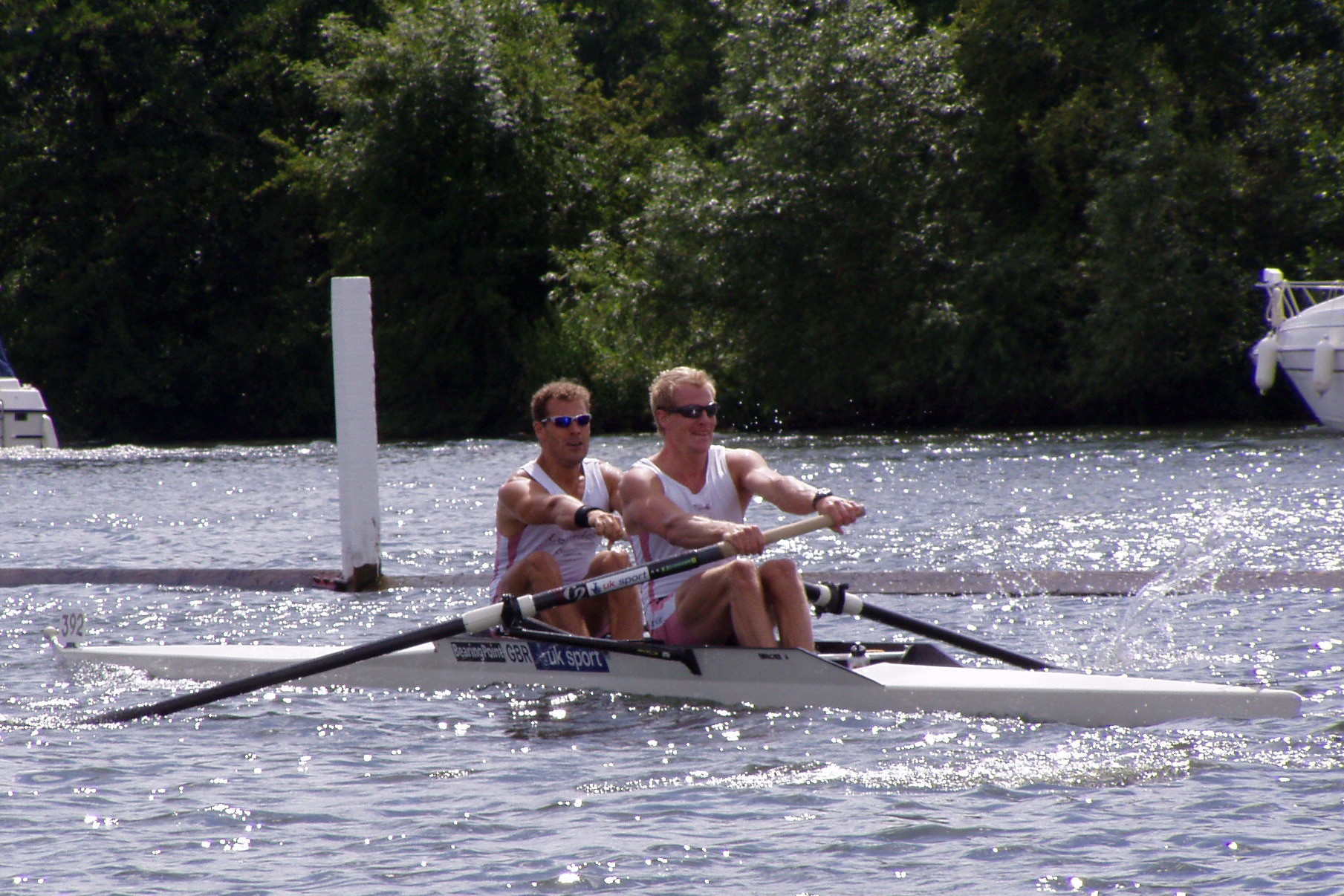
In this picture of a coxless pair in the drive part of a "stroke", the rower on the right of the photo and closest to the stern of the boat is the "stroke" rower and is rowing "strokeside" or "port"

In rowing, the stroke is the rower seated closest to the stern of the boat. In the United Kingdom, the "stroke side" is the port side of the boat, because sweep rowing boats are usually rigged such that the stroke is on the port side of the boat.

== Stroke seat ==
When the boat has more than one rower, the rower closest to the stern of the boat is referred to as "stroke". This is the most important position in the boat, because the stroke rower sets the stroke rate and rhythm for the rest of the crew to follow. Stroke seat has to be a very calm and yet very competitive individual. A good stroke will lead a team by bringing the best out of every rower in the boat. The rower at the opposite end of the boat is referred to as bow. Dudley Storey, double Olympic medallist for New Zealand and later the country's national coach, describes the required qualities of a stroke as follows:

You'd like them to be a person who is half mad, who love to go, love to fight and love to be amongst it all the time and can instil some of their qualities into the people behind.

— Dudley Storey, Interview by David Leggat published in The New Zealand Herald, 24 August 2006

== Stroke side ==
Stroke side refers to the port side of the boat, which is on the left-hand side of a cox facing forwards, but on the right-hand side of a rower facing backwards. The usage derives from the tradition of having the stroke rower's oar be on the port side of the boat. However, the stroke seat oar in a sweep boat does not always emerge from port side, such as when the boat is starboard rigged.

In Cornish pilot gigs, the stroke rower's oar is on the starboard (right) side and therefore stroke side refers to the starboard side of the boat.
