= Trinity Hall Boat Club =

British Rowing Club

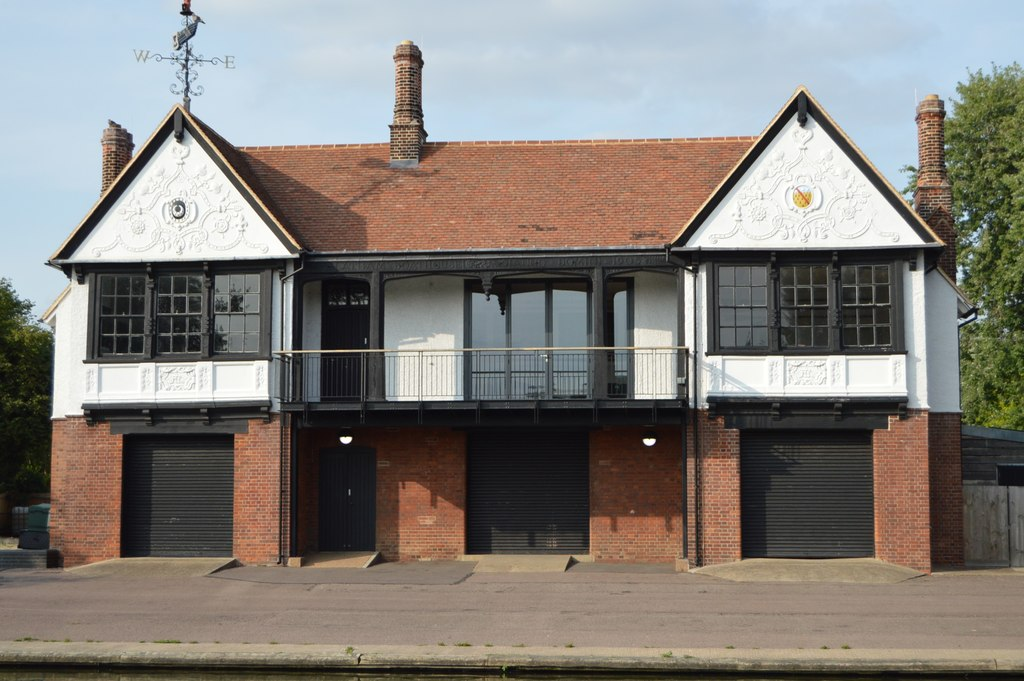

- Motto: Our Power's a Crescent
- Location: Cambridge, England
- Coordinates: 52°12′39.54″N 0°7′52.87″E
- Home water: River Cam
- Founded: 1827
- Affiliations: British Rowing; CUCBC; University College BC (Sister College)
- Website: trinityhallbc.co.uk

Notable members
- Tom James

Trinity Hall Boat Club (THBC) is the rowing club of Trinity Hall, a college of the University of Cambridge. Founded in 1827 it is amongst the oldest college boat clubs in Cambridge, England. Historically, it is the most successful Cambridge college at Henley Royal Regatta with a number of victories, including winning all the events but one in 1887. The club boats primarily from their Latham-Scott Boathouse on the River Cam.

THBC has produced numerous rowers for the Oxford and Cambridge Boat Race and various national teams, including Tom James, who stroked the 8+ from Great Britain to the B-final in the 2004 Olympics in Athens and won gold with the 4- at the 2008 Olympics in Beijing.

The club colours are black and white, its nickname is "Black and White army", its motto "Our power's a crescent" (the college crest showing a crescent ermine; the motto used to be "Our powers are crescent" taking the old meaning for crescent meaning growing – i.e. a crescent moon is a waxing moon), and its supporters shout "Row Hall" to encourage the rowers. Unlike other boat clubs, whose scarves are derived from their college scarves, its scarf is made in a black and white tartan.

THBC has a senior rowers' (alumni) club called The Black and White Society.

== History ==
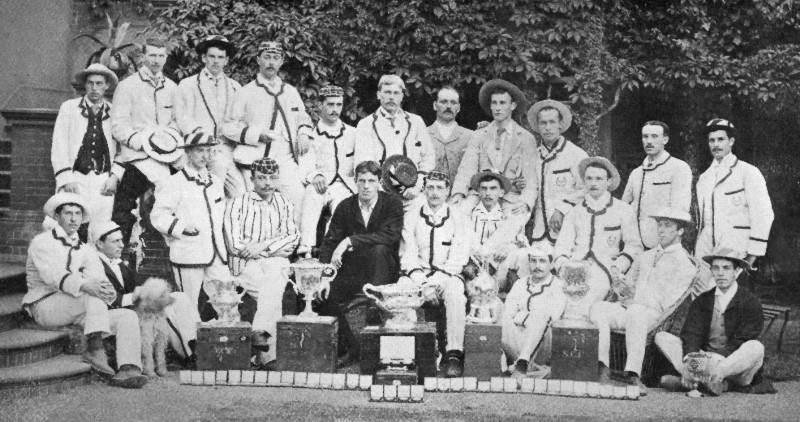
1887 Trinity Hall Henley boat

The college first boats, both men and women, have been Head of the Lent Bumps and May Bumps on numerous occasions in the history of the races, dominating the Mays in the 1890s and both events in the early 1990s.

From 1890 until 1898, Trinity Hall stayed Head of the Mays for 33 consecutive days, which remains to this day the longest continuous defence by a single club of the bumps headship since the Lent and May Bumps became separate events.

Trinity Hall were eventually deposed from the top spot in 1898 by First Trinity, who held the headship for 10 days, then Third Trinity who held the headship for a further 24 days, then again by First Trinity for 2 more days, meaning that boats from Trinity College held the headship for 36 consecutive days, but until the 1940s, Trinity maintained more than one boatclub.

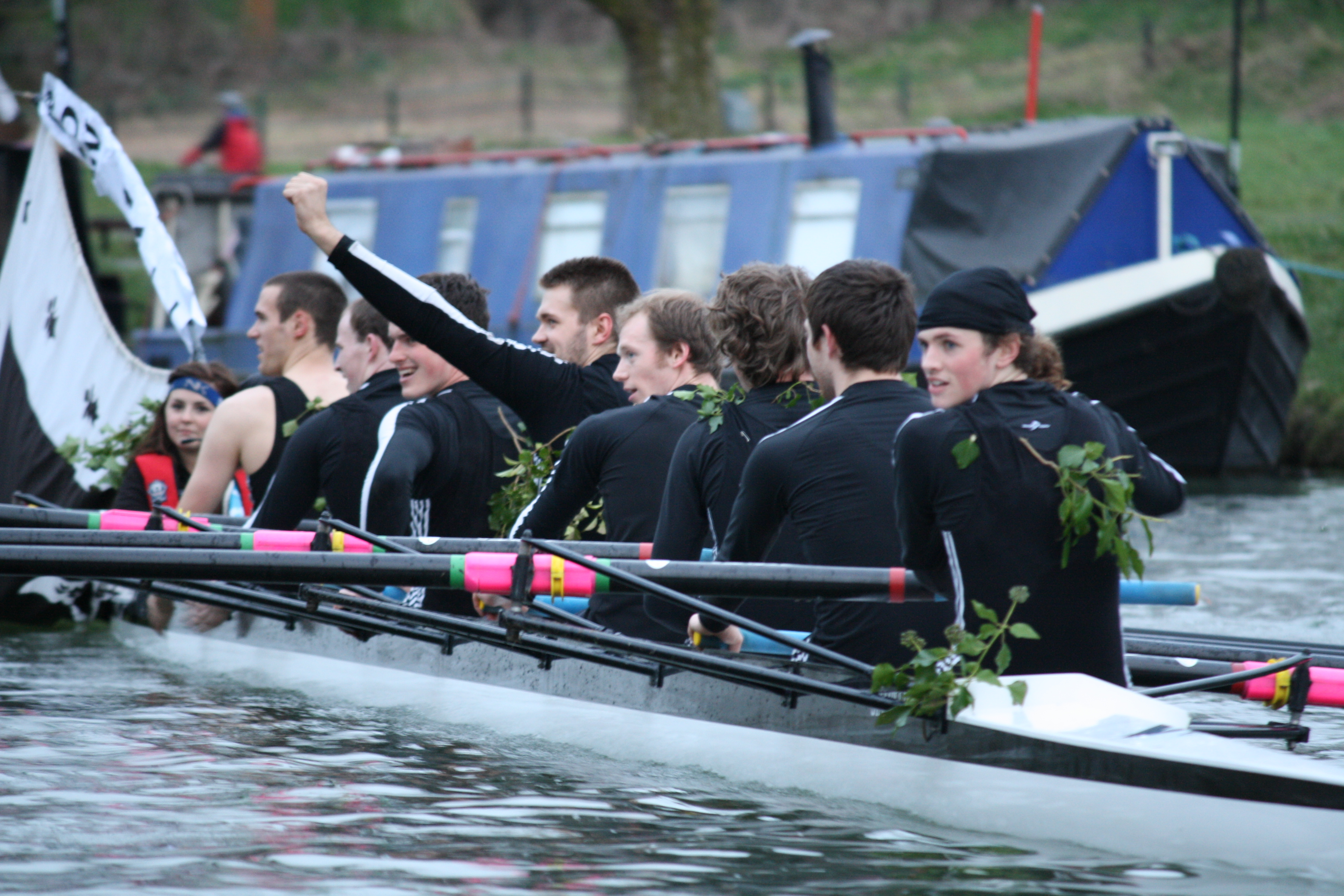
Trinity Hall Boat Club Men's First boat after bumping Caius to be awarded Blades in Lent Bumps 2009

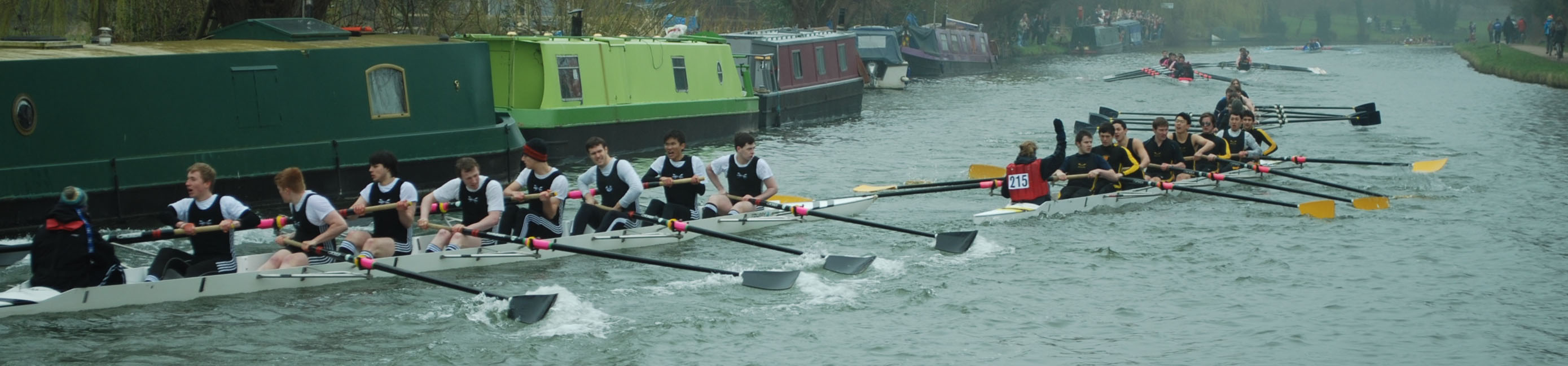
Trinity Hall M2 bump Clare M2 at Lent bumps 2011

== Honours ==
=== Henley Royal Regatta ===
Year	Races won
1880	Ladies' Challenge Plate
1885	Stewards' Challenge Cup, Visitors' Challenge Cup
1886	Grand Challenge Cup
1887	Grand Challenge Cup, Stewards' Challenge Cup, Ladies' Challenge Plate, Thames Challenge Cup, Visitors' Challenge Cup
1888	Stewards' Challenge Cup
1891	Visitors' Challenge Cup
1895	Grand Challenge Cup
1899	Wyfold Challenge Cup
1900	Wyfold Challenge Cup
1901	Thames Challenge Cup, Wyfold Challenge Cup
1902	Thames Challenge Cup
1905	Visitors' Challenge Cup
1907	Ladies' Challenge Plate
1910	Wyfold Challenge Cup, Visitors' Challenge Cup
1913	Silver Goblets & Nickalls' Challenge Cup
1914	Silver Goblets & Nickalls' Challenge Cup
1935	Ladies' Challenge Plate
1937	Visitors' Challenge Cup
1939	Silver Goblets & Nickalls' Challenge Cup, Visitors' Challenge Cup
1947	Visitors' Challenge Cup
1951	Visitors' Challenge Cup
1955	Visitors' Challenge Cup

=== Boat Race representatives ===
The following rowers were part of the rowing club at the time of their participation in The Boat Race.

Men's boat race

Year	Name
1829	A. F. Bayford
1829	Thos. Entwistle
1836	Perceval Hartley
1856	J. P. Salter
1856	H. E. Fairrie
1857	W. H. Holley
1860	M. Coventry
1861	M. Coventry
1861	R. U. P. Fitzgerald
1862	R. U. P. Fitzgerald
1864	D. F. Steavenson
1865	D. F. Steavenson
1866	D. F. Steavenson
1868	T. D. Warner (cox)
1870	J. F. Strachan
1873	T. S. Turnbull
1874	A. S. Estcourt
1878	R. J. Spurrell
1881	E. C. Brooksbank
1881	H. W. Woodhouse
1883	S. Swann
1883	F. C. Meyrick
1884	S. Swann
1885	W. K. Hardacre
1885	S. Swann
1885	R. H. Coke
1886	C. J. Bristowe
1886	J. Walmsley
1887	R. McKenna
1887	P. Landale
1887	C. J. Bristowe
1888	R. H. Symonds-Tayler
1888	L. Hannen
1888	C. B. P. Bell
1888	P. Landale
1888	F. H. Maugham
1888	J. R. Roxburgh (cox)
1889	R. H. Symonds-Tayler
1889	L. Hannen
1889	C. B. P. Bell
1889	P. Landale
1889	F. H. Maugham
1890	J. M. Sladen
1890	J. F. Rowlatt
1890	A. S. Duffield
1891	E. W. Lord
1891	W. Landale
1891	J. F. Rowlatt
1891	C. T. Fogg-Elliot
1891	J. V. Braddon (cox)
1892	E. W. Lord

Year	Name
1892	W. Landale
1892	C. T. Fogg-Elliot
1892	J. V. Braddon
1893	R. F. Bayford
1893	C. T. Fogg-Elliot
1894	C. T. Fogg-Elliot
1894	F. C. Begg (cox)
1895	T. B. Hope
1895	F. C. Stewart
1895	A. S. Bell
1895	D. A. Wauchop
1895	F. C. Begg (cox)
1896	T. B. Hope
1896	W. A. Bieber
1896	A. S. Bell
1896	W. J. Fernie
1896	T. R. Paget-Tomlinson (cox)
1897	D. E. Campbell-Muir
1897	A. S. Bell
1897	B. H. Howell
1897	W. A. Bieber
1897	W. J. Fernie
1898	A. S. Bell
1899	N. L. Calvert
1901	B. C. Cox
1902	F. J. Escombe
1902	C. H. S. Wasbrough (cox)
1903	B. G. A. Scott
1904	S. M. Bruce
1904	M. V. Smith
1904	B. G. A. Scott
1906	D. C. R. Stuart
1907	D. C. R. Stuart
1907	R. F. R. P. Boyle
1908	H. E. Kitching
1908	D. C. R. Stuart
1908	R. F. R. P. Boyle (cox)
1909	G. L. Thomson
1909	H. E. Kitching
1909	E. S. Hornidge
1909	D. C. R. Stuart
1909	G. D. Compston (cox)
1910	C. P. Cooke
1911	S. E. Swann
1912	S. E. Swann
1913	S. E. Swann
1914	S. E. Swann
1920	A. Swann
1921	A. B. Ritchie
1921	L. E. Stephens (cox)
1922	L. E. Stephens (cox)

Year	Name
1927	R. J. Elles
1929	R. J. Elles
1933	J. E. Gilmour
1936	H. W. Mason
1937	H. W. Mason
1937	R. J. L. Perfitt
1937	T. H. Hunter (cox)
1938	G. Keppel
1938	T. H. Hunter (cox)
1939	H. Parker
1939	C. B. Sanford
1946	P. L. P. Macdonnell
1946	J. G. Gosse
1946	J. H. Neame
1947	D. J. C. Meyrick
1948	D. J. C. Meyrick
1954	K. A. Masser
1954	M. G. Baynes
1955	K. A. Masser
1955	J. J. Vernon
1956	M. J. H. Nightingale
1956	A. A. M. Mays-Smith
1956	K. A. Masser
1956	M. G. Baynes
1959	G. H. Brown
1960	G. H. Brown
1963	D. F. Legget
1964	D. F. Legget
1967	N. J. Hornsby
1968	N. J. Hornsby
1969	N. J. Hornsby
1973	M. D. Williams (cox)
1986	M. Wilson
1991	Richard A. B. Smith
1993	Will T. M. Mason
1994	Roger D. Taylor
1994	Will T. M. Mason
1995	Roger D. Taylor
1996	Henry G. C. Clarke
1997	David Cassidy
1998	A. J. Potts
2000	Daniel J. Tweddie
2000	Gideon J. Glassman (cox)
2003	Ben Smith
2003	Tom James
2005	Tom James
2006	Tom James
2007	Tom James
2008	Colin Scott

Women's boat race

Year	Name
2023	Rosa Millard
