= The Boat Race 1894 =

51st Boat Race
- Date: 17 March 1894
- Winner: Oxford
- Margin of victory: 3 1/2 lengths
- Winning time: 21 minutes 39 seconds
- Overall record (Cambridge–Oxford): 22–28
- Umpire: Frank Willan (Oxford)

The 51st Boat Race took place on 17 March 1894. The Boat Race is an annual side-by-side rowing race between crews from the Universities of Oxford and Cambridge along the River Thames. Oxford went into the race leading by 27–22 in the event, and of the eighteen participants, half had previous Boat Race experience. Umpired by former rower Frank Willan, Oxford won the race by 3 1/2 lengths in a time of 21 minutes 39 seconds, for their fifth consecutive victory in the event. It was the largest margin of victory since the 1883 race.

== Background ==
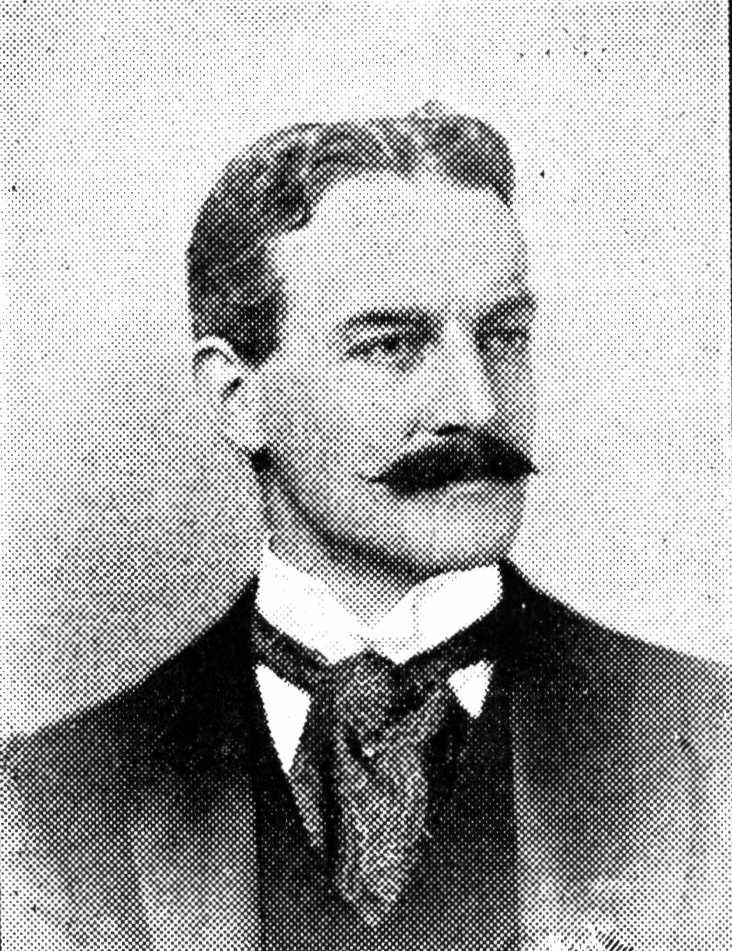
R. C. Lehmann coached Oxford, despite being a Cantabrigian and former captain of 1st Trinity Boat Club.

The Boat Race is a side-by-side rowing competition between the boat clubs of University of Oxford (sometimes referred to as the "Dark Blues") and the University of Cambridge (sometimes referred to as the "Light Blues"). The race was first held in 1829, and since 1845 has taken place on the 4.2-mile (6.8 km) Championship Course on the River Thames in southwest London. The rivalry is a major point of honour between the two universities, as of 2014 it is followed throughout the United Kingdom and broadcast worldwide. Oxford went into the race as reigning champions, having beaten Cambridge by 1 1/4 lengths in the previous year's race, and held the overall lead, with 27 victories to Cambridge's 22 (excluding the "dead heat" of 1877).

Oxford were coached by William Fletcher (who rowed for Oxford in the 1890, 1891, 1892 and 1893 races), R. C. Lehmann (former president of the Cambridge Union Society and captain of the 1st Trinity Boat Club; although he had rowed in the trials eights for Cambridge, he was never selected for the Blue boat) and Douglas McLean (an Oxford Blue five times between 1883 and 1887). Cambridge's coach was Charles William Moore (who represented Cambridge in the 1881, 1882, 1883 and 1884 races).

The umpire for the race for the sixth year in a row was Frank Willan who won the event four consecutive times, rowing for Oxford in the 1866, 1867, 1868 and 1869 races.

== Crews ==
The Oxford crew weighed an average of 12 st 3 lb (77.3 kg), 7 pounds (3.2 kg) per rower more than their opponents. Cambridge's crew contained four rowers who had previously participated in the Boat Race, including Lionel Arthur Edward Ollivant, Charles Thurstan Fogg-Elliiot, Robert Orme Kerrison and Trevor Gwyn Elliot Lewis. Oxford saw five members of the previous year's crew return, including Charles Murray Pitman and Hugh Benjamin Cotton who were rowing in their third consecutive Boat Race. The Dark Blues also saw the introduction of William Burton Stewart, a rugby union Blue who Drinkwater described as "a useful heavy-weight" who had rowed for Brasenose and Leander Club at the Henley Royal Regatta. Eleven of the sixteen rowers were educated at Eton College. All of the competitors in the race were registered as British.

Seat	Oxford			Cambridge		
Seat	Name	College	Weight	Name	College	Weight
Bow	H. B. Cotton (P)	Magdalen	9 st 13 lb	A. H. Finch	3rd Trinity	11 st 0 lb
2	M. C. Pilkington	Magdalen	12 st 4 lb	N. W. Paine	3rd Trinity	11 st 1 lb
3	W. Burton Stewart	Brasenose	13 st 5 lb	Sir Charles Ross	3rd Trinity	11 st 8 lb
4	J. A. Morrison	New College	12 st 5 lb	H. M. Bland	3rd Trinity	11 st 5 lb
5	E. G. Tew	Magdalen	13 st 7 lb	L. A. E. Olliivant	1st Trinity	13 st 5.75 lb
6	T. H. E. Stretch	New College	12 st 4 lb	C. T. Fogg-Elliot (P)	Trinity Hall	11 st 8 lb
7	W. E. Crum	New College	12 st 0 lb	R. O. Kerrison	3rd Trinity	11 st 12 lb
Stroke	C. M. Pitman	New College	12 st 0 lb	T. G. E. Lewis	3rd Trinity	11 st 12 lb
Cox	L. Portman	University	8 st 5 lb	F. C. Begg	Trinity Hall	8 st 0 lb
Source: (P) – boat club president

== Race ==
The Championship Course, along which the race is conducted

Oxford won the toss and elected to start from the Surrey station, handing the Middlesex side of the river to Cambridge. The umpire was accompanied on his launch by the Duke of York (later to become King George V). Despite a poor tide, weather conditions were good and the race commenced at 9:12 a.m. Rating 41 strokes per minute, Cambridge took a brief early lead but were soon overhauled by Oxford who led by half a length by the Mile Post.

Taking advantage of the bend in the river, the Dark Blues continued to pull away and were clear of Cambridge by the time the crews passed below Hammersmith Bridge. At The Doves pub, Oxford were more than a length clear, and had extended that to three lengths clear by Chiswick and five by Barnes Bridge. Relaxing down to a paddle, Oxford passed the finishing post with a three-and-a-half length advantage, in a winning time of 21 minutes 39 seconds. It was Oxford's fifth consecutive win, was their largest margin of victory since the 1883 race, and took the overall record in the event to 28–22 in their favour.
