= The Boat Race 1895 =

52nd Boat Race
- Date: 30 March 1895
- Winner: Oxford
- Margin of victory: 2 1/4 lengths
- Winning time: 20 minutes 50 seconds
- Overall record (Cambridge–Oxford): 22–29
- Umpire: Frank Willan (Oxford)

The 52nd Boat Race took place on 30 March 1895. The Boat Race is an annual side-by-side rowing race along the River Thames between crews from the Universities of Oxford and Cambridge. The 1895 race was umpired by former Oxford rower Frank Willan with one of the Oxford coaches, R. C. Lehmann being a former Cambridge alumnus. Although Cambridge made the quicker start, Oxford recovered, had the lead by Hammersmith Bridge, and won by 2 1/4 lengths in a time of 20 minutes 50 seconds. It was their sixth victory in a row and took the overall record in the event to 29–22 in Oxford's favour.

== Background ==
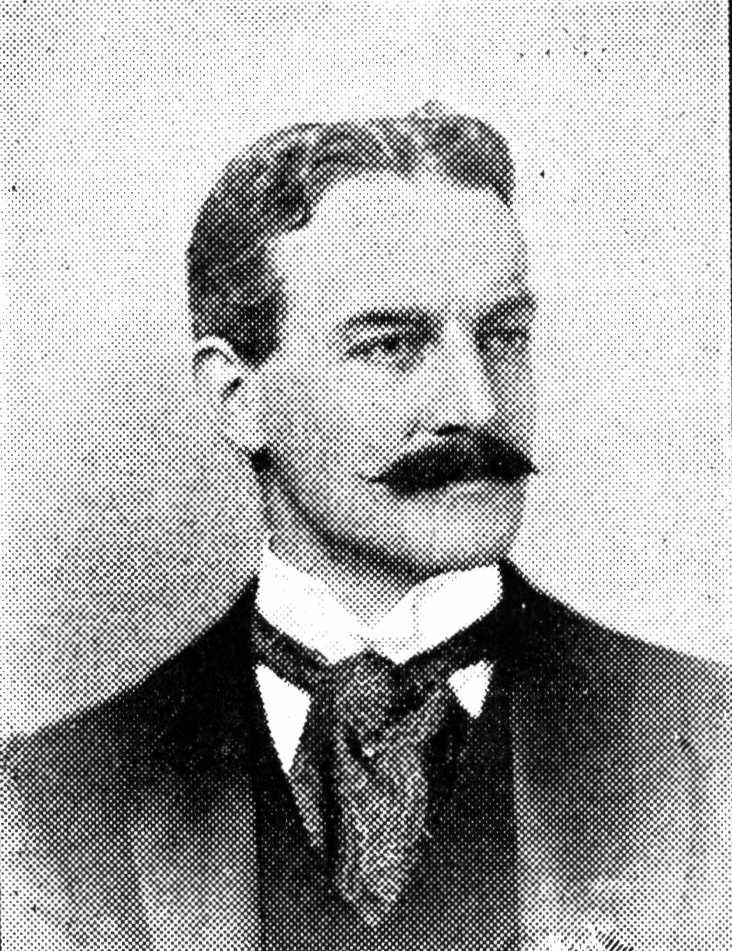
R. C. Lehmann coached Oxford, despite having been a Cantabrigian and former captain of 1st Trinity Boat Club.

The Boat Race is a side-by-side rowing competition between the boat clubs of University of Oxford (sometimes referred to as the "Dark Blues") and the University of Cambridge (sometimes referred to as the "Light Blues"). The race was first held in 1829, and since 1845 has taken place on the 4.2-mile (6.8 km) Championship Course on the River Thames in southwest London. The rivalry is a major point of honour between the two universities; as of 2014 it is followed throughout the United Kingdom and broadcast worldwide. Oxford went into the 1895 race as reigning champions, having beaten Cambridge by 3 1/2 lengths in the previous year's race, and held the overall lead, with 28 victories to Cambridge's 22 (excluding the "dead heat" of 1877).

Oxford's coaches were G. C. Bourne (who rowed for Oxford in the 1882 and 1883 races), Douglas McLean (an Oxford Blue five times from 1883 through 1887), and R. C. Lehmann. Lehmann was a former president of the Cambridge Union Society and captain of the 1st Trinity Boat Club; although he had rowed in the trial eights for Cambridge, he was never selected for the Blue boat. The Cambridge team was coached by Stanley Muttlebury (who rowed for Cambridge five times between the 1886 and 1890 races).

Both crews suffered variously during the buildup to the race. A hard frost which persisted late into the season hindered training, forcing both crews to move to Bourne End and more open water. Both crews were then struck by influenza, Cambridge three weeks before the race and Oxford the week of the race itself. As such, Cambridge were in good form going into the race, Oxford less so.

James Brooks Close was the non-rowing president of the Cambridge University Boat Club – he had rowed in the 1872, 1873 and 1874 races. His election was considered by author and former Oxford rower George Drinkwater as "a bold step" in an attempt to overcome dissension as a result of Cambridge's heavy defeat the prior year. Close was called away during the crew's practice, and Francis Cargill Begg took captaincy of the crew. The umpire for the race for the seventh year in a row was Frank Willan who won the event four consecutive times, rowing for Oxford in the 1866, 1867, 1868 and 1869 races.

== Crews ==
The Oxford crew weighed an average of 12 st 1.875 lb (76.9 kg), 1.125 pounds (0.5 kg) per rower more than their opponents. Cambridge's cox Francis Cargill Begg was the only Light Blue participant with Boat Race experience, having steered the boat in the previous year's race. Oxford's crew contained six rowers who had previously rowed in the event, including Hugh Benjamin Cotton and Charles Murray Pitman, both of whom were taking part in their fourth consecutive race. Seven of the Oxford crew were educated at Eton College.

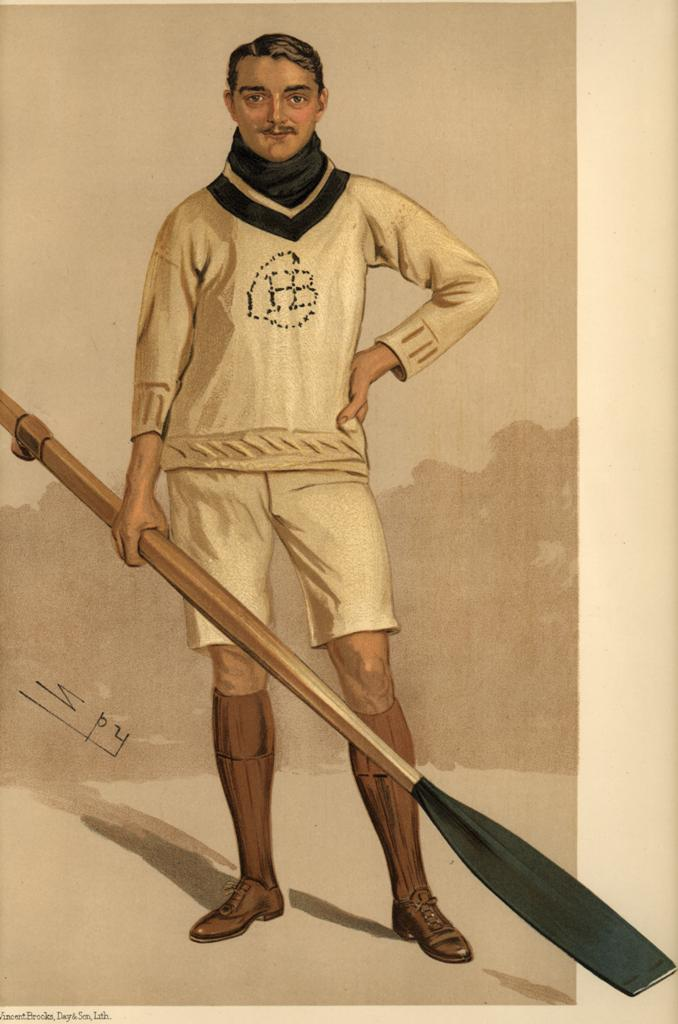
Hugh Benjamin Cotton, rowing at bow for Oxford, was participating in his fourth race.

Seat	Oxford			Cambridge		
Seat	Name	College	Weight	Name	College	Weight
Bow	H. B. Cotton	Magdalen	9 st 13 lb	T. B. Hope	Trinity Hall	10 st 11 lb
2	M. C. Pilkington	Magdalen	12 st 4 lb	F. C. Stewart	Trinity Hall	12 st 1.5 lb
3	C. K. Phillips	New College	11 st 12 lb	H. A. Game	1st Trinity	12 st 2 lb
4	T. H. E. Stretch	New College	12 st 4 lb	W. S. Adie	1st Trinity	13 st 2.5 lb
5	W. Burton Stewart	Brasenose	13 st 7.5 lb	T. J. G. Duncanson	Emmanuel	13 st 3 lb
6	C. D. Burnell	Magdalen	13 st 0.5 lb	R. Y. Bonsey	Lady Margaret	12 st 4 lb
7	W. E. Crum	New College	12 st 2 lb	A. S. Bell	Trinity Hall	11 st 2 lb
Stroke	C. M. Pitman (P)	New College	12 st 0 lb	D. A. Wauchope	Trinity Hall	11 st 9 lb
Cox	C. P. Serocold	New College	8 st 1 lb	F. C. Begg	Trinity Hall	8 st 9 lb
Source: (P) – boat club president James B. Close acted as non-rowing president for Cambridge.

== Race ==
The Championship Course, along which the race is conducted

Oxford won the toss and elected to start from the Surrey station, handing the Middlesex side of the river to Cambridge. In a heavy wind and a strong tide, Willan started the race at 4:08 p.m. Cambridge, outrating their opponents at the start, took an early lead, but Oxford's steady rhythm drew them back level and then ahead. By Hammersmith Bridge, the Dark Blues held a lead of three-quarters of a length and took advantage of Cambridge experiencing rough water. With a well-timed spurt from Oxford's boat club president and stroke Pitman, the Dark Blues went clear of Cambridge and held a two-length lead by the time they reached Chiswick.

With a lead of three lengths by Barnes Bridge, Oxford slowed to a paddle and passed the finishing post with a lead of two and a quarter lengths, in a winning time of 20 minutes 50 seconds. It was the Dark Blues' sixth consecutive victory and took the overall record to 29–22 in their favour.
