= The Boat Race 1900 =

57th Boat Race
- Date: 31 March 1900
- Winner: Cambridge
- Margin of victory: 20 lengths
- Winning time: 18 minutes 45 seconds
- Overall record (Cambridge–Oxford): 24–32
- Umpire: Frank Willan (Oxford)

The 57th Boat Race took place on 31 March 1900. Held annually, the Boat Race is a side-by-side rowing race between crews from the Universities of Oxford and Cambridge along the River Thames. Cambridge won by twenty lengths in a record-equalling time of 18 minutes 45 seconds, taking the overall record in the event to 32–24 in Oxford's favour.

== Background ==
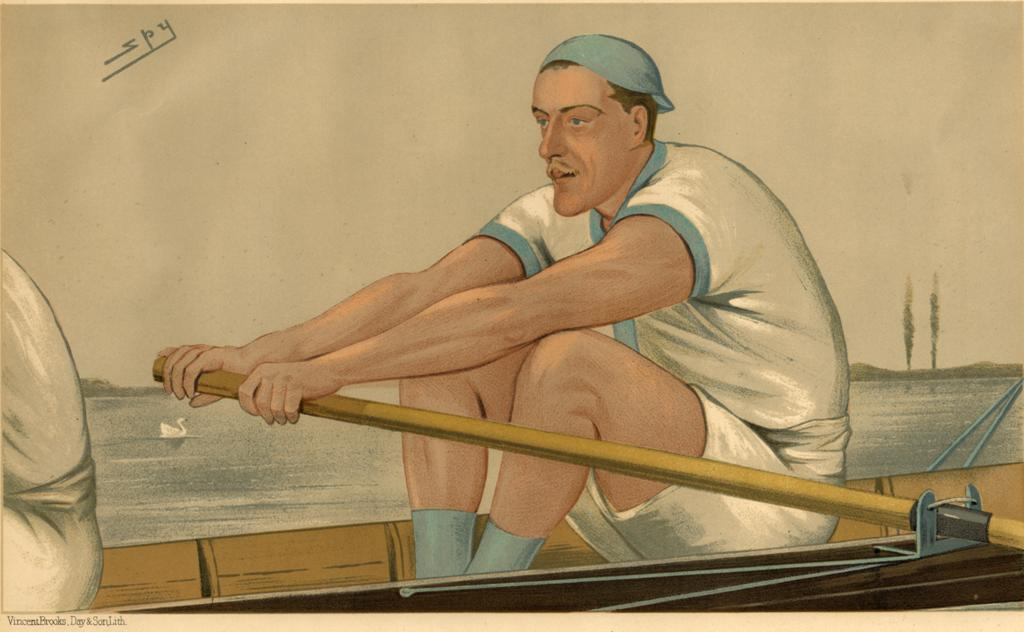
Stanley Muttlebury coached the Cambridge crew.

The Boat Race is a side-by-side rowing competition between the University of Oxford (sometimes referred to as the "Dark Blues") and the University of Cambridge (sometimes referred to as the "Light Blues"). The race was first held in 1829, and since 1845 has taken place on the 4.2-mile (6.8 km) Championship Course on the River Thames in southwest London. The rivalry is a major point of honour between the two universities and followed throughout the United Kingdom and worldwide. Cambridge went into the race as reigning champions, having won the 1899 race by 3 1/4 lengths, while Oxford led overall with 32 victories to Cambridge's 23 (excluding the "dead heat" of 1877). Leading up to the race, Oxford suffered a variety of misfortune: M. C. McThornhill was ordered by his doctor not to row, H. J. Hale was injured and president Felix Warre contracted scarlet fever.

Cambridge were coached by James Brookes Close, who had rowed for the Light Blues three times between 1872 and 1874, and Stanley Muttlebury, five-time Blue for Cambridge between 1886 and 1890. Oxford's coaches were Harcourt Gilbey Gold (Dark Blue president the previous year and four-time Blue) and Douglas McLean (an Oxford Blue five times between 1883 and 1887). The umpire for the race for the eleventh year in a row was Frank Willan who had won the event four consecutive times, rowing for Oxford in the 1866, 1867, 1868 and 1869 races.

== Crews ==
The Cambridge crew weighed an average of 12 st 4.625 lb (78.1 kg), 0.25 pounds (0.1 kg) per rower more than their opponents. Oxford's crew contained three members with Boat Race experience: C. E. Johnston, C. W. Tomlkinson and cox G. S. Maclagan. Cambridge saw six of their 1899 crew return, including William Dudley Ward and Raymond Broadly Etherington-Smith, both of whom were rowing in their third race. Eight of the nine Light Blues were students at Trinity College. Oxford's stroke H. H. Dutton, a native of South Australia, was the only non-British participant registered in the race. Author and former Oxford rower George Drinkwater suggested that this year's Cambridge crew, along with the Oxford crew which rowed in the 1897 race, "stand in a class by themselves among University crews." He also described the Oxford crew as "one of the poorest that ever came from the Isis".

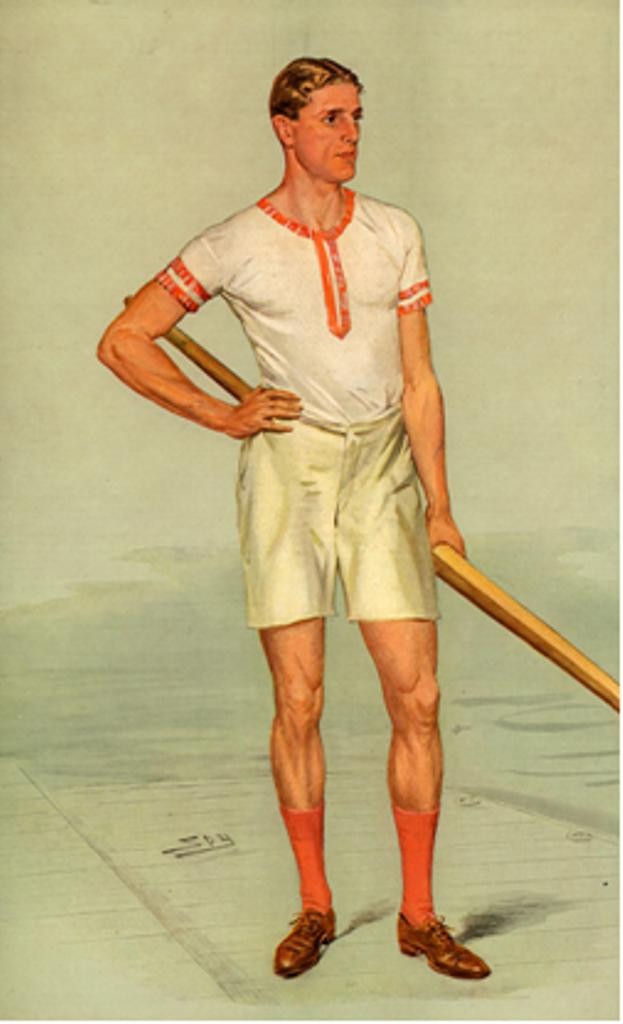
Raymond Etherington-Smith rowed for Cambridge in the number five seat.

Seat	Oxford			Cambridge		
Seat	Name	College	Weight	Name	College	Weight
Bow	H. H. Dutton	Magdalen	10 st 9.5 lb	S. P. Cockerell	3rd Trinity	11 st 10 lb
2	R. H. Culme-Seymour	New College	11 st 7.5 lb	C. J. M. Adie	1st Trinity	12 st 3 lb
3	C. E. Johnston	New College	12 st 12 lb	B. W. D. Brooke	1st Trinity	11 st 10.25 lb
4	C. W. Tomkinson	Balliol	11 st 13 lb	J. E. Payne	Peterhouse	13 st 0 lb
5	Lord Grimston	Christ Church	13 st 10.75 lb	R. B. Etherington-Smith	1st Trinity	12 st 11.25 lb
6	H. B. Kittermaster	Christ Church	14 st 6 lb	R. H. Sanderson	1st Trinity	12 st 13.25 lb
7	T. B. Etherington-Smith	Oriel	11 st 5.75 lb	W. Dudley Ward (P)	3rd Trinity	12 st 9 lb
Stroke	C. P. Rowley	Magdalen	11 st 12.5 lb	J. H. Gibbon	3rd Trinity	11 st 8 lb
Cox	G. S. Maclagan	Magdalen	8 st 5 lb	G. A. Lloyd	3rd Trinity	9 st 0 lb
Source: (P) – boat club president Felix Warre was the Oxford's non-rowing president.

== Race ==
The Championship Course along which the Boat Race is contested

Oxford won the toss and elected to start from the Surrey station, handing the Middlesex side of the river to Cambridge. In good conditions, umpire Willan got the race under way at 2:00 p.m. whereupon Cambridge took the lead immediately. By Craven Steps they were three lengths ahead and continued to draw away from the Dark Blues, to win by 20 lengths in a time of 18 minutes 45 seconds. It was the fastest winning time in the history of the event, equalling that set by Oxford in the 1893 race. Although it was the Light Blues' second consecutive victory, it followed a run of nine consecutive wins for Oxford – overall the Dark Blues led 32–24.
