= The Boat Race 1892 =

49th Boat Race
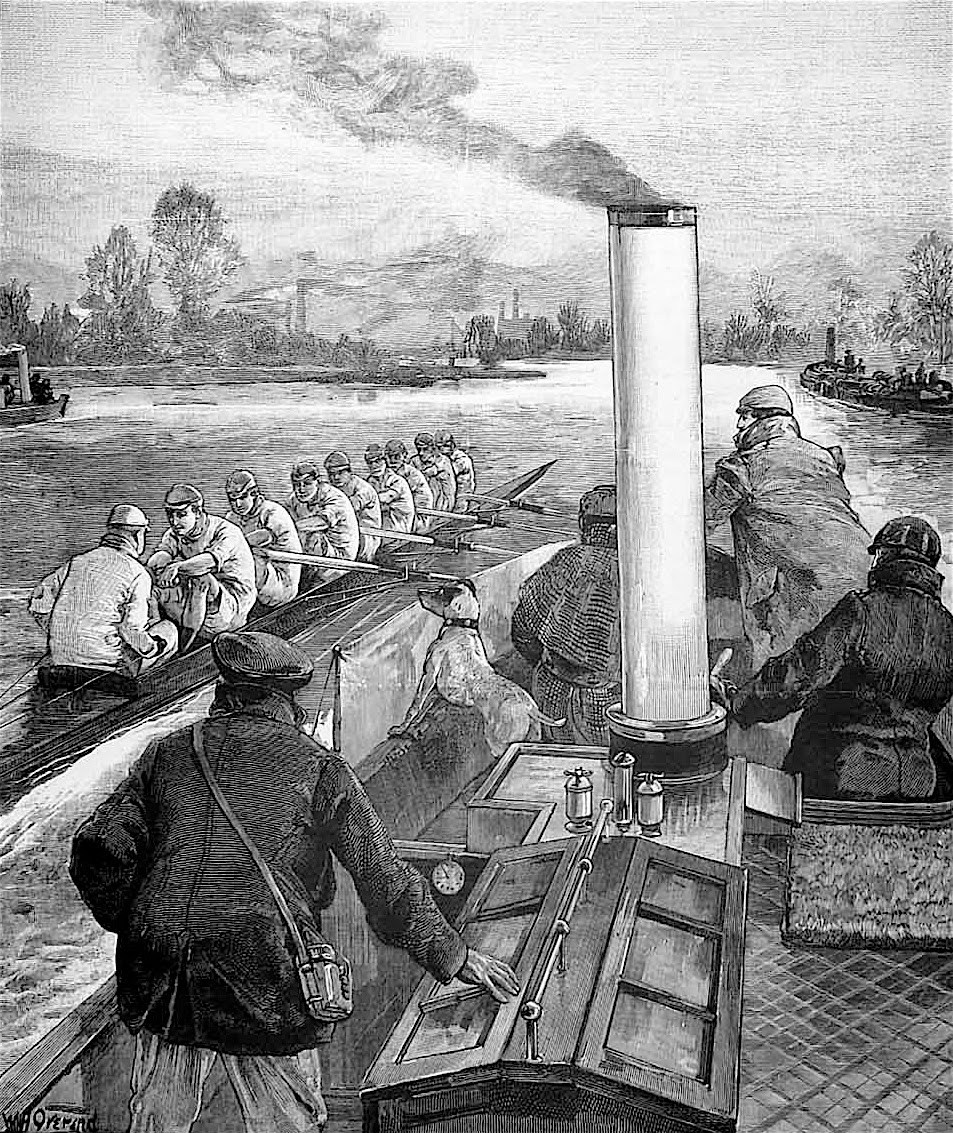
- Engraving of Cambridge's Stanley Muttlebury coaching the crew from a steamer
- Date: 9 April 1892
- Winner: Oxford
- Margin of victory: 2 1/4 lengths
- Winning time: 19 minutes 10 seconds
- Overall record (Cambridge–Oxford): 22–26
- Umpire: Frank Willan (Oxford)

The 49th Boat Race took place on 9 April 1892. The Boat Race is an annual side-by-side rowing race between crews from the Universities of Oxford and Cambridge along the River Thames. Oxford went into the event as reigning champions, having won the previous year's race. In total, twelve of the competitors had previous Boat Race experience. In a race umpired by former rower Frank Willan, Oxford won by 2 1/4 lengths in a time of 19 minutes 10 seconds. It was their third consecutive victory and the fastest in the history of the event at that time.

== Background ==
The Boat Race is a side-by-side rowing competition between the boat clubs of University of Oxford (sometimes referred to as the "Dark Blues") and the University of Cambridge (sometimes referred to as the "Light Blues"). The race was first held in 1829, and since 1845 has taken place on the 4.2-mile (6.8 km) Championship Course on the River Thames in southwest London. The rivalry is a major point of honour between the two universities; as of 2014 it is followed throughout the United Kingdom and broadcast worldwide. Oxford went into the race as reigning champions, having beaten Cambridge by half a length in the previous year's race, and held the overall lead, with 25 victories to Cambridge's 22 (excluding the "dead heat" of 1877).

Oxford's coaches were F. P. Bully, R. C. Lehmann (former president of the Cambridge Union Society and captain of the 1st Trinity Boat Club; although he had rowed in the trial eights for Cambridge, he was never selected for the Blue boat) Douglas McLean (who rowed five times for Oxford between 1883 and 1887), and Guy Nickalls (five-time Blue between 1887 and 1891). Lehmann had briefly coached Cambridge in the "early stages" of their preparation.

The umpire for the race for the fourth year in a row was Frank Willan who won the event four consecutive times, rowing for Oxford in the 1866, 1867, 1868 and 1869 races.

== Crews ==
The Oxford crew weighed an average of 12 st 3 lb (77.4 kg), 5.125 pounds (2.3 kg) per rower more than their opponents. Cambridge's crew contained two rowers with no experience in the event, Robert Grieve Neill rowing at number two and Graham Campbell Kerr at number six. Four of their crew attended Trinity Hall. Oxford saw four rowers and the cox return from the previous year's race, and included Guy Nickalls rowing in his fourth consecutive event. Six of the Dark Blues had been pupils at Eton College, and four were studying at Magdalen College. One rower was registered as non-British: Edward Wason Lord for Cambridge hailed from Australia, having attending Brisbane Grammar School.

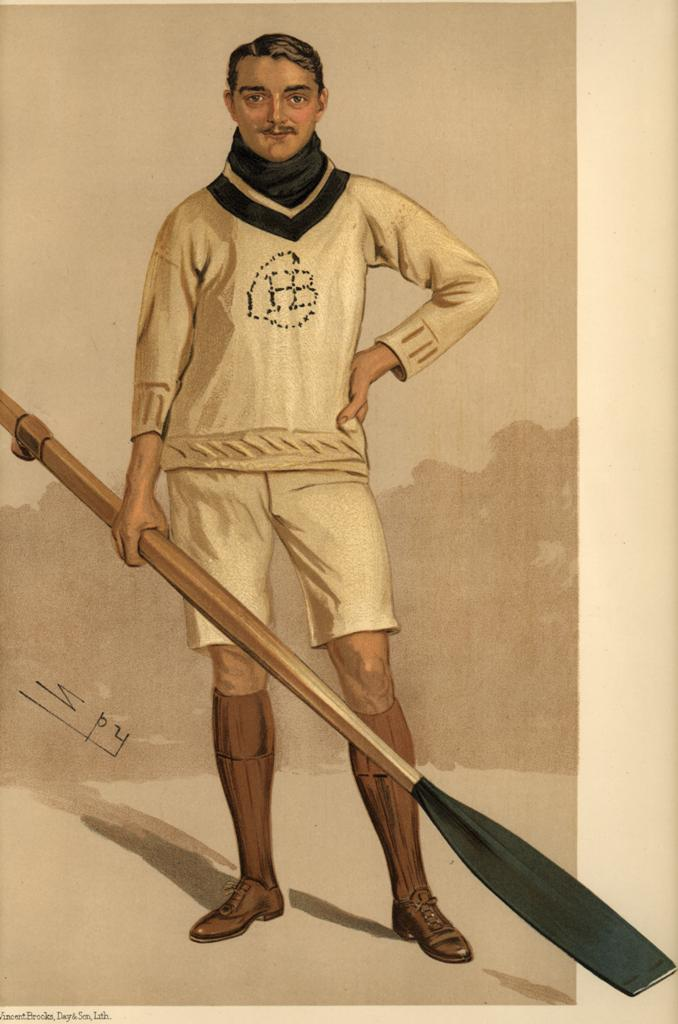
Hugh Benjamin Cotton rowed at bow for Oxford.

Seat	Oxford			Cambridge		
Seat	Name	College	Weight	Name	College	Weight
Bow	H. B. Cotton	Magdalen	9 st 13 lb	E. W. Lord	Trinity Hall	10 st 12 lb
2	J. A. Ford	Brasenose	11 st 9 lb	R. G. Neill	Jesus	11 st 11 lb
3	W. A. S. Hewett	University	12 st 2 lb	G. Francklyn	3rd Trinity	12 st 3 lb
4	F. E. Robeson	Merton	13 st 7.5 lb	E. T. Fison	Corpus Christi	12 st 6.5 lb
5	V. Nickalls	Magdalen	13 st 1 lb	W. Landale	Trinity Hall	13 st 1 lb
6	W. A. L. Fletcher	Magdalen	13 st 8 lb	G. C. Kerr	1st Trinity	12 st 1 lb
7	R. P. P. Rowe (P)	Magdalen	13 st 2 lb	C. T. Fogg-Elliot	Trinity Hall	11 st 8.5 lb
Stroke	C. M. Pitman	New College	11 st 12 lb	G. Elin	3rd Trinity	10 st 10 lb
Cox	J. P. Heywood-Lonsdale	New College	8 st 9 lb	J. V. Braddon	Trinity Hall	7 st 13 lb
Source: (P) – boat club president, John Friend Rowlatt acted as Cambridge's non-rowing president

== Race ==
The Championship Course, along which the race is conducted

Oxford won the toss and elected to start from the Middlesex station, handing the Surrey side of the river to Cambridge, the pre-race favourites (although former rower and author George Drinkwater states this was as a result of a practice row after which Oxford's time was inaccurately reported in the press). Conditions for the race were described by Drinkwater as "perfect" with a light breeze from the east and a good tide. Oxford led from the start and were half a length ahead by Craven Steps (approximately 1,080 yards (990 m) along the course), extending to almost a length at Harrods Furniture Depository. A spurt from Cambridge's stroke Gerard Elin reduced the deficit and by Hammersmith Bridge they were half a length down.

A malfunctioning slide rendered Elin's contributions to the Light Blues' efforts negligible and Oxford accelerated away, being two lengths up by Chiswick and four lengths ahead as they passed under Barnes Bridge. They passed the finishing post 2 1/4 lengths ahead in a time of 19 minutes and 10 seconds. It was Oxford's third consecutive victory, and was the fastest winning time in the history of the race (when held on the Championship Course), beating the 1873 race winning time by 25 seconds.
