= The Boat Race 1889 =

46th Boat Race
- Date: 30 March 1889
- Winner: Cambridge
- Margin of victory: 3 lengths
- Winning time: 20 minutes 14 seconds
- Overall record (Cambridge–Oxford): 22–23
- Umpire: Frank Willan (Oxford)

The 46th Boat Race took place on 30 March 1889. The Boat Race is an annual side-by-side rowing race between crews from the Universities of Oxford and Cambridge along the River Thames. For the first time in the history of the event, all eight rowers in the Cambridge crew had rowed the previous year. Cambridge won by three lengths in a time of 20 minutes 14 seconds, their fourth consecutive victory which took the overall record in the event to 23–22 in Oxford's favour.

== Background ==
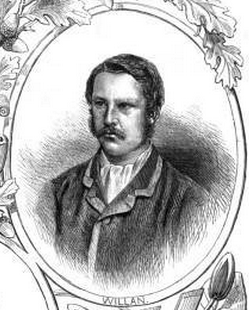
Former rower Frank Willan umpired the race for the first time.

The Boat Race is a side-by-side rowing competition between the University of Oxford (sometimes referred to as the "Dark Blues") and the University of Cambridge (sometimes referred to as the "Light Blues"). First held in 1829, the race takes place on the 4.2 miles (6.8 km) Championship Course on the River Thames in southwest London. The rivalry is a major point of honour between the two universities; it is followed throughout the United Kingdom and as of 2014, broadcast worldwide. Cambridge went into the race as reigning champions, having won the previous year's race by seven lengths, while Oxford held the overall lead, with 23 victories to Cambridge's 21 (excluding the "dead heat" of 1877).

Cambridge's coaches were Fraser Emilie Churchill (who had rowed for the Light Blues in the 1883, 1884 and 1885 races), Charles William Moore (who represented Cambridge in the 1881, 1882, 1883 and 1884 races), Frederick Islay Pitman (who rowed in 1884, 1885 and 1886), Herbert Edward Rhodes (who rowed in the 1873, 1874, 1875 and 1876 races) and Henry Tudor Trevor-Jones. Oxford were coached by Tom Edwards-Moss (who rowed for the Dark Blues four times between the 1875 and the 1878 races) and William Grenfell (who rowed for Oxford in 1877, 1878 and was non-rowing boat club president in 1879).

The umpire for the race was Frank Willan who won the event four consecutive times, rowing for Oxford in the 1866, 1867, 1868 and 1869 races.

== Crews ==
The Oxford crew weighed an average of 12 st 3.5 lb (77.6 kg), 3.25 pounds (1.5 kg) per rower more than their opponents. For the only time in the history of the event, every rower from the Cambridge crew had taken part in the previous year's race, with Stanley Muttlebury making his fourth consecutive appearance. As a result of the availability of the former Blues, there was little competition in the trial eights, and the Cambridge crew were considered to be "not nearly as fast" as they had been in 1888. Only the cox Thomas Welby Northmore was new to the event. Oxford's crew contained three former Blues, including H. R. Parker who was rowing in his third Boat Race. All of the competitors were registered as British.

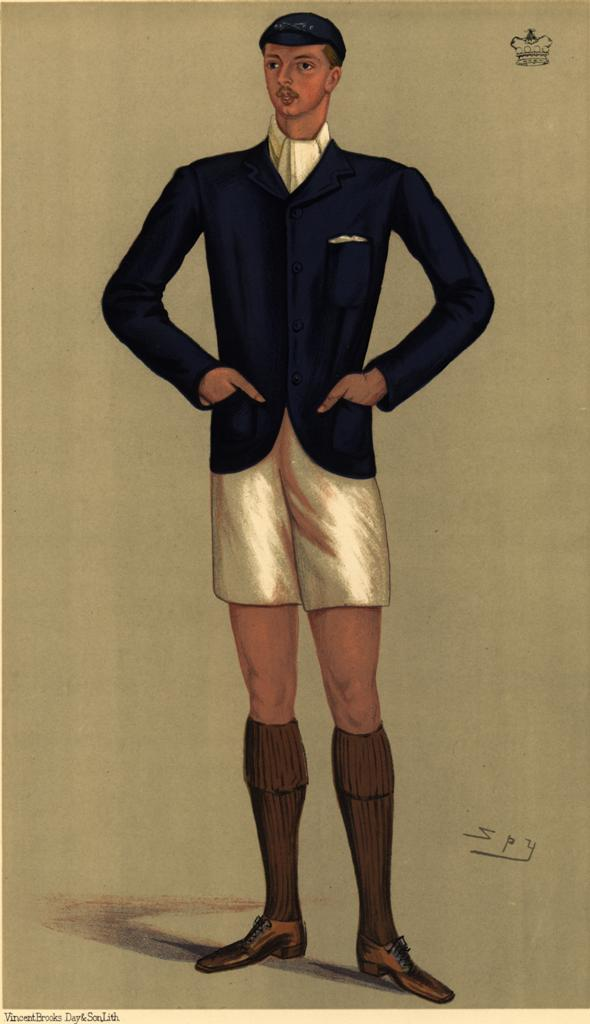
Caricature of Lord Ampthill as the Oxford University Boat Club president

Seat	Oxford			Cambridge		
Seat	Name	College	Weight	Name	College	Weight
Bow	H. E. L. Puxley	Corpus Christi	11 st 8.5 lb	R. H. Symonds-Tayler	Trinity Hall	10 st 10.5 lb
2	R. P. P. Rowe	Magdalen	11 st 9 lb	L. Hannen	Trinity Hall	11 st 4 lb
3	T. A. Cook	Wadham	12 st 2 lb	R. H. P. Orde	1st Trinity	11 st 10 lb
4	F. C. Drake	New College	12 st 12 lb	C. B. P. Bell	Trinity Hall	13 st 1 lb
5	Lord Ampthill	New College	12 st 11 lb	S. D. Muttlebury (P)	3rd Trinity	13 st 9 lb
6	H. R. Parker (P)	Brasenose	13 st 11 lb	P. Landale	Trinity Hall	12 st 8 lb
7	G. Nickalls	Magdalen	12 st 5 lb	F. H. Maugham	Trinity Hall	11 st 5.5 lb
Stroke	W. F.C Holland	Brasenose	10 st 12 lb	J. C. Gardner	Emmanuel	11 st 10 lb
Cox	J. P. Heywood-Lonsdale	New College	8 st 2.5 lb	T. W. Northmore	Queens'	7 st 13 lb
Source: (P) – boat club president

== Race ==
The Championship Course, along which the race is conducted

Cambridge won the toss and elected to start from the Surrey station, handing the Middlesex side of the river to Oxford. Commencing at 1.15 p.m., at a high stroke rate Cambridge took an early lead, before settling down to a "long, steady and tremendously powerful stroke". By the Crab Tree pub, they were almost clear and despite a spurt from the Dark Blues, Cambridge were a length-and-a-half ahead by Hammersmith Bridge. They continued to pull away at Chiswick and despite the "tremendous sea raised by the wind above Barnes", extended their lead further to win by three lengths in a time of 20 minutes 14 seconds. It was Cambridge's fourth consecutive victory and their fifth in six years, with the fastest winning time since Oxford's victory in the 1882 race. The victory took the overall record to 23–22 in Oxford's favour.
