= The Boat Race 1899 =

56th Boat Race
- Date: 25 March 1899
- Winner: Cambridge
- Margin of victory: 3 1/4 lengths
- Winning time: 21 minutes 4 seconds
- Overall record (Cambridge–Oxford): 23–32
- Umpire: Frank Willan (Oxford)

The 56th Boat Race took place on 25 March 1899. Held annually, the Boat Race is a side-by-side rowing race between crews from the Universities of Oxford and Cambridge along the River Thames. Cambridge won, their first success in a decade, by 3 1/4 lengths in a time of 21 minutes 4 seconds. The victory took the overall record in the event to 32–23 in Oxford's favour.

== Background ==
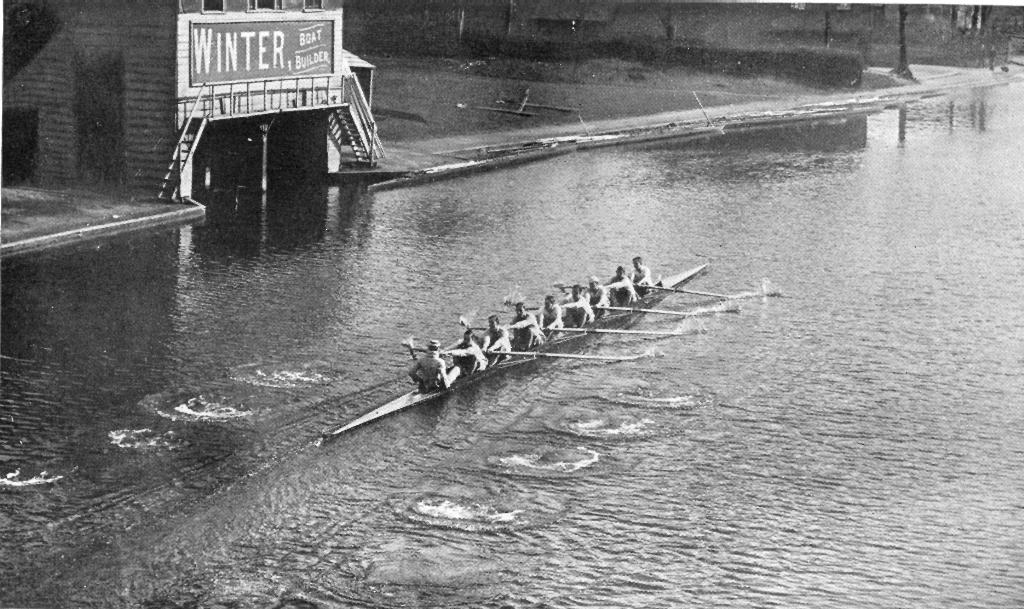
Cambridge University's crew in practice

The Boat Race is a side-by-side rowing competition between the University of Oxford (sometimes referred to as the "Dark Blues") and the University of Cambridge (sometimes referred to as the "Light Blues"). The race was first held in 1829, and since 1845 has taken place on the 4.2-mile (6.8 km) Championship Course on the River Thames in southwest London. The rivalry is a major point of honour between the two universities; it is followed throughout the United Kingdom and as of 2014, broadcast worldwide. Oxford went into the race as reigning champions, having won the 1898 race "easily", with Cambridge leading overall with 32 victories to Cambridge's 22 (excluding the "dead heat" of 1877).

Oxford's coaches were G. C. Bourne who had rowed for Oxford in the 1882 and 1883 races, Douglas McLean (an Oxford Blue five times between 1883 and 1887) and R. P. Rowe (who rowed for Oxford four times between 1889 and 1892). Cambridge were coached by William Fletcher, Oxford Blue and R. C. Lehmann, the former president of the Cambridge Union Society and captain of the 1st Trinity Boat Club (although he had rowed in the trials eights for Cambridge, he was never selected for the Blue boat). The umpire for the race for the tenth year in a row was Frank Willan who won the event four consecutive times, rowing for Oxford in the 1866, 1867, 1868 and 1869 races.

== Crews ==
The Oxford crew weighed an average of 12 st 5 lb (78.3 kg), 0.5 pounds (0.23 kg) per rower more than their opponents. Cambridge saw three rowers with Boat Race experience return, in Claude Goldie, former Boat Club president William Dudley Ward and Raymond Broadly Etherington-Smith. Oxford's crew contained four former Blues, including Harcourt Gilbey Gold who was rowing at stroke for the fourth consecutive year. All but one of the Oxford crew were educated at Eton College; Cambridge's crew contained five Old Etonians. Australian rower Noel Leonard Calvert was the only participant in the race registered as non-British. C. E. Johnston of Oxford was the father of Brian Johnston, the cricket broadcaster, who, 82 years later, would become the BBC's principal Boat Race commentator.

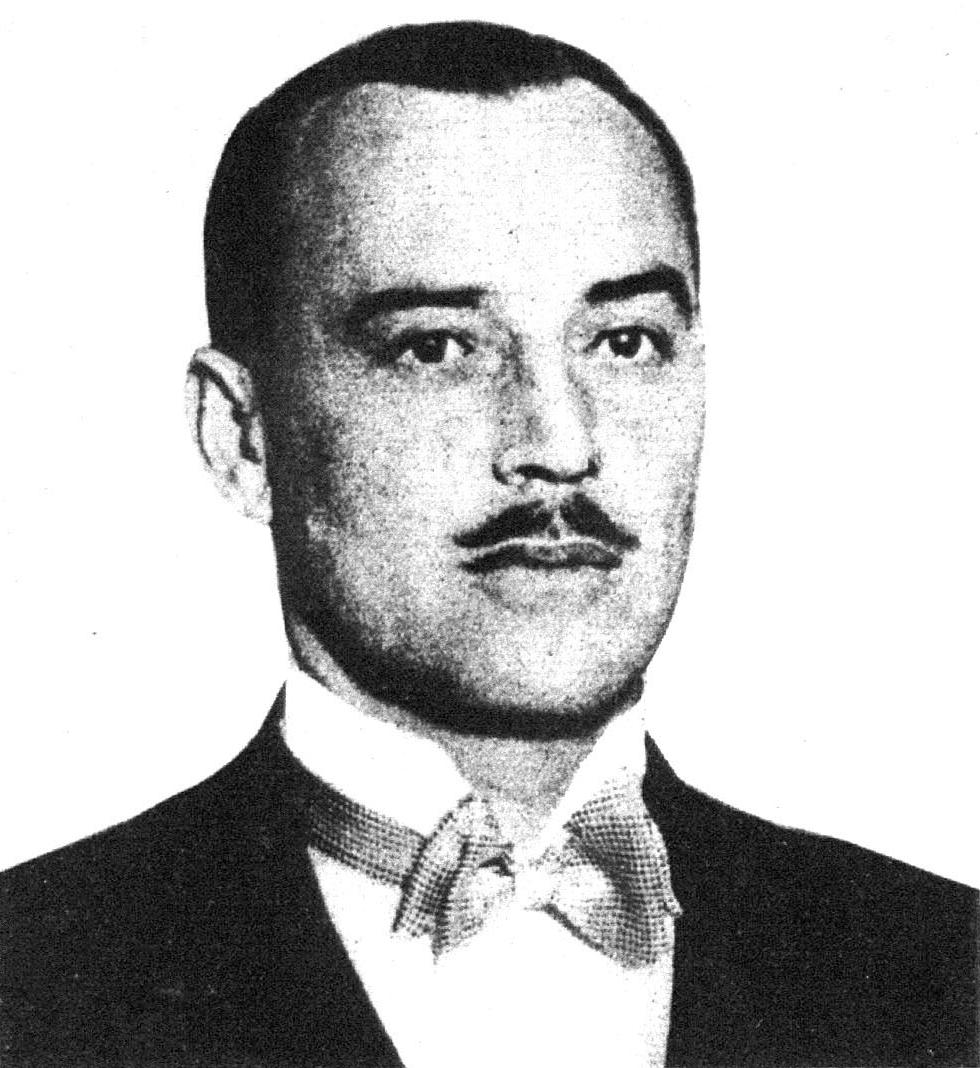
George Lloyd, 1st Baron Lloyd (left) was the cox for the Cambridge boat, while William Dudley Ward (right) rowed at number seven.

Seat	Oxford			Cambridge		
Seat	Name	College	Weight	Name	College	Weight
Bow	R. O. Pitman	New College	10 st 10 lb	W. H. Chapman	3rd Trinity	11 st 2 lb
2	C. W. Tomkinson	Balliol	12 st 0 lb	N. L. Calvert	Trinity Hall	11 st 13 lb
3	A. H. D. Steel	Balliol	12 st 11.5 lb	C. J. D. Goldie	3rd Trinity	12 st 1.5 lb
4	H. J. Hale	Balliol	12 st 9 lb	J. E. Payne	Peterhouse	12 st 10.5 lb
5	C. E. Johnston	New College	13 st 0 lb	R. B. Etherington-Smith (P)	1st Trinity	12 st 10 lb
6	F. W. Warre	Balliol	12 st 13 lb	R. H. Sanderson	1st Trinity	12 st 10 lb
7	A. T. Herbert	Balliol	12 st 13 lb	W. Dudley Ward	3rd Trinity	12 st 9.5 lb
Stroke	H. G. Gold (P)	Magdalen	11 st 11.5 lb	J. H. Gibbon	3rd Trinity	11 st 3.5 lb
Cox	G. S. Maclagan	Magdalen	8 st 1 lb	G. A. Lloyd	3rd Trinity	8 st 5 lb
Source: (P) – boat club president

== Race ==
The Championship Course along which the Boat Race is contested

Cambridge won the toss and elected to start from the Surrey station, handing the Middlesex side of the river to Oxford. The weather on the day of the race was good, but the tide was poor. Willan got the race underway at 12:58 p.m. and the crews remained reasonably level until the Mile Post, where Oxford held a quarter of a length lead. Cambridge began to reduce the deficit, so Oxford stroke Gold increased the rate in an attempt to make the most of the favourable bend in the river. The spurt had little effect, and the Light Blue stroke John Houghton Gibbon responded in kind with a burst of his own.

The Cambridge boat drew away quickly and were well ahead by The Doves pub, allowing them "to take matters fairly easily over the latter part of the course". Cambridge won by three and a quarter lengths in a time of 21 minutes and 4 seconds. It was their first victory in ten years and took the overall record to 32–23 in Oxford's favour. Author and former Oxford rower George Drinkwater remarked that "Cambridge were definitely the better crew" and noted that their effort was all the more impressive as number four John Ernest Payne had been struck down by influenza just a day before the race.
