= The Boat Race 1891 =

48th Boat Race
- Date: 21 March 1891
- Winner: Oxford
- Margin of victory: 1/2 length
- Winning time: 21 minutes 48 seconds
- Overall record (Cambridge–Oxford): 22–25
- Umpire: Frank Willan (Oxford)

The 48th Boat Race took place on 21 March 1891. The Boat Race is an annual side-by-side rowing race between crews from the Universities of Oxford and Cambridge along the River Thames. Oxford went into the race leading 24–22 in the event overall. In total, eight rowers who were participating had previous Boat Race experience. Umpired by former Oxford rower Frank Willan, pre-race favourites Oxford won by half-a-length in a time of 21 minutes 48 seconds. It was Oxford's narrowest winning margin since the 1867 race.

== Background ==
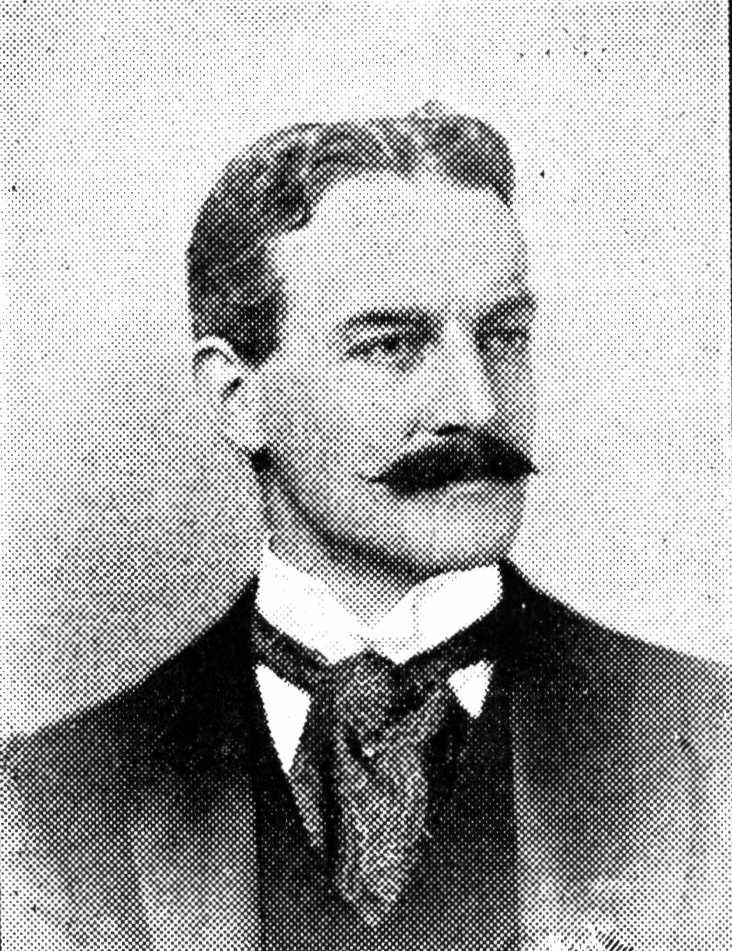
R. C. Lehmann coached Oxford, despite being a Cantabrigian and former captain of 1st Trinity Boat Club.

The Boat Race is a side-by-side rowing competition between the boat clubs of University of Oxford (sometimes referred to as the "Dark Blues") and the University of Cambridge (sometimes referred to as the "Light Blues"). The race was first held in 1829, and since 1845 has taken place on the 4.2-mile (6.8 km) Championship Course on the River Thames in southwest London. The rivalry is a major point of honour between the two universities, as of 2014 it is followed throughout the United Kingdom and broadcast worldwide. Oxford went into the race as reigning champions, having beaten Cambridge by one length in the previous year's race, and held the overall lead, with 24 victories to Cambridge's 22 (excluding the "dead heat" of 1877).

Cambridge were coached by Arthur Middleton Hutchinson (who had rowed for the Light Blues in the 1881 and 1882 races) while Oxford's coach was R. C. Lehmann, former president of the Cambridge Union Society and captain of the 1st Trinity Boat Club. Although Lehmann had rowed in the trials eights for Cambridge, he was never selected for the Blue boat.

The umpire for the race for the third year in a row was Frank Willan who won the event four consecutive times, rowing for Oxford in the 1866, 1867, 1868 and 1869 races.

== Crews ==
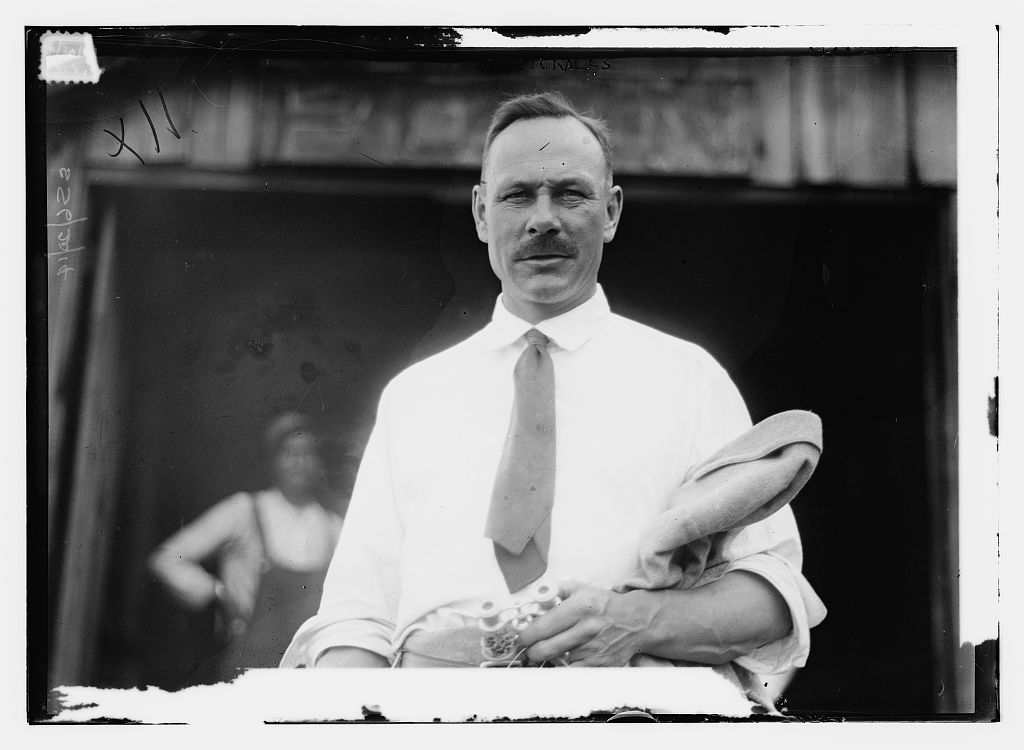
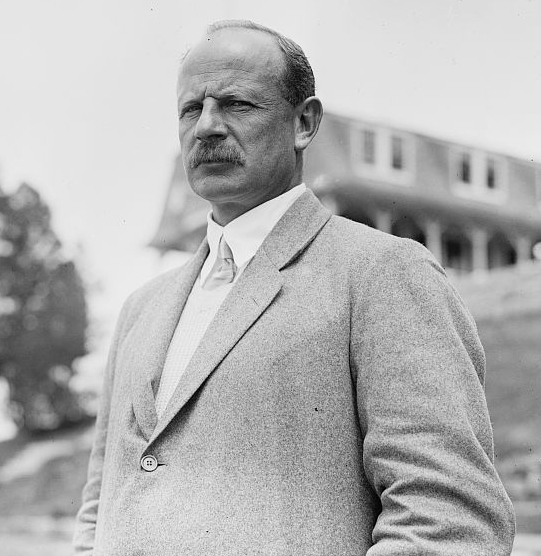
Brothers Vivian (left) and Guy Nickalls (right) rowed for Oxford.

The Oxford crew weighed an average of 12 st 3.75 lb (77.7 kg), 7.75 pounds (3.5 kg) per rower more than their opponents. Cambridge saw four former Blues return to the boat, in Gilbert Francklyn, Edmund Towers Fison, John Friend Rowlatt and Cambridge University Boat Club president Gerard Elin. Oxford's crew contained four rowers with Boat Race experience, including Guy Nickalls who was rowing in his fourth consecutive race, this year alongside his brother Vivian. The Dark Blues also featured cox John Pemberton Heywood-Lonsdale for the third time in a row.

Four of the Oxford crew were studying at Magdalen College while five of the Cambridge crew had matriculated to Trinity Hall. Two rowers were registered as non-British, F. Wilkinson for Oxford and Edward Wason Lord for Cambridge both hailed from Australia. Wilkinson was forced to leave the Oxford crew during practice as he suffered from influenza; he was considered sufficiently fit to return to the crew but, according to Drinkwater, "never found his real form again".

Seat	Oxford			Cambridge		
Seat	Name	College	Weight	Name	College	Weight
Bow	W. M. Poole	Magdalen	10 st 7.5 lb	J. W. Noble	Gonville and Caius	11 st 5.75 lb
2	R. P. P. Rowe	Magdalen	11 st 11 lb	E. W. Lord	Trinity Hall	10 st 10.25 lb
3	V. Nickalls	Magdalen	12 st 9 lb	G. Francklyn	3rd Trinity	12 st 3 lb
4	G. Nickalls	Magdalen	12 st 5 lb	E. T. Fison	Corpus Christi	12 st 7.5 lb
5	F. Wilkinson	Brasenose	13 st 8 lb	W. Landale	Trinity Hall	12 st 11 lb
6	Lord Ampthill (P)	New College	13 st 5lb	J. F. Rowlatt	Trinity Hall	11 st 12 lb
7	W. A. L. Fletcher	Christ Church	13 st 2 lb	C. T. Fogg-Elliot	Trinity Hall	11 st 4 lb
Stroke	C. W. Kent	Brasenose	13 st 0 lb	G. Elin (P)	3rd Trinity	10 st 13 lb
Cox	J. P. Heywood-Lonsdale	New College	8 st 6 lb	J. V. Braddon	Trinity Hall	7 st 12 lb
Source: (P) – boat club president

== Race ==
The Championship Course, along which the race is conducted

Oxford were pre-race favourites, and won the toss and elected to start from the Middlesex station, handing the Surrey side of the river to Cambridge. The race commenced at 11:09 a.m., in a northerly wind, and despite being outrated by Cambridge, the Dark Blues took an early lead and were a quarter of a length ahead as the crews passed Craven Steps. Just before the Mile Post, Oxford's lead was around half a length, but Cambridge pushed on to take the lead by Hammersmith Bridge. Oxford responded and held a marginal lead as the crews passed The Doves pub, and the boats exchanged the lead several times along Chiswick Reach.

The Dark Blues took the lead and were three-quarters of a length up at Barnes Bridge. Elin increased Cambridge's stroke rate; Charles Kent, the Oxford stroke responded and although the bend in the river favoured the Dark Blues, Cambridge closed the gap. However, it was too late to stop Oxford taking the victory. The Dark Blues passed the finishing post with a half-length lead in a time of 21 minutes 48 seconds. It was their second consecutive victory and the narrowest winning margin since the 1867 race, taking the overall record to 25–22 in Oxford's favour.
