= The Boat Race 1890 =

47th Boat Race
- Date: 26 March 1890
- Winner: Oxford
- Margin of victory: 1 length
- Winning time: 22 minutes 3 seconds
- Overall record (Cambridge–Oxford): 22–24
- Umpire: Frank Willan (Oxford)

The 47th Boat Race took place in 1890. Held annually, it is a side-by-side rowing race between crews from the Universities of Oxford and Cambridge along the River Thames. The race, umpired by former Oxford rower Frank Willan) was won by Oxford. They passed the finishing post one length ahead of Cambridge in a time of 22 minutes 3 seconds, and took their overall lead in the event to 24–22.

== Background ==
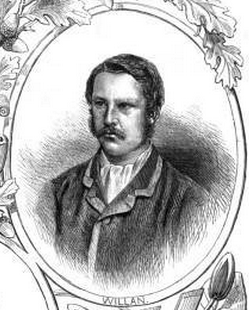
Frank Willan was the umpire for the race.

The Boat Race is a side-by-side rowing competition between the boat clubs of University of Oxford (sometimes referred to as the "Dark Blues") and the University of Cambridge (sometimes referred to as the "Light Blues"). The race was first held in 1829, and since 1845 has taken place on the 4.2-mile (6.8 km) Championship Course on the River Thames in southwest London. The rivalry is a major point of honour between the two universities; as of 2014 it is followed throughout the United Kingdom and broadcast worldwide. Cambridge went into the race as reigning champions, having beaten Oxford by seven lengths in the previous year's race, while Oxford held the overall lead, with 23 victories to Cambridge's 22 (excluding the "dead heat" of 1877).

Oxford's coaches were F. P. Bully, F. Fenner, William Grenfell (who rowed for Oxford in the 1877 and 1878 races, and was non-rowing boat club president in the 1879 race) and Frederick Smith, 2nd Viscount Hambleden. There is no record of who coached Cambridge. The Light Blues began their practice on 9 January, nearly two weeks ahead of Oxford, but it was not until 4 March that Cambridge persuaded James Cardwell Gardner to return as stroke. They improved and were considered by author and former Oxford rower George Drinkwater to be "by no means a bad crew, though deficient in length and watermanship". Despite William Fletcher being considered "one of the greatest sixes", and although "no greater worker has ever rowed", he was positioned at stroke.

The umpire for the race for the second year in a row was Frank Willan who won the event four consecutive times, rowing for Oxford in the 1866, 1867, 1868 and 1869 races.

== Crews ==
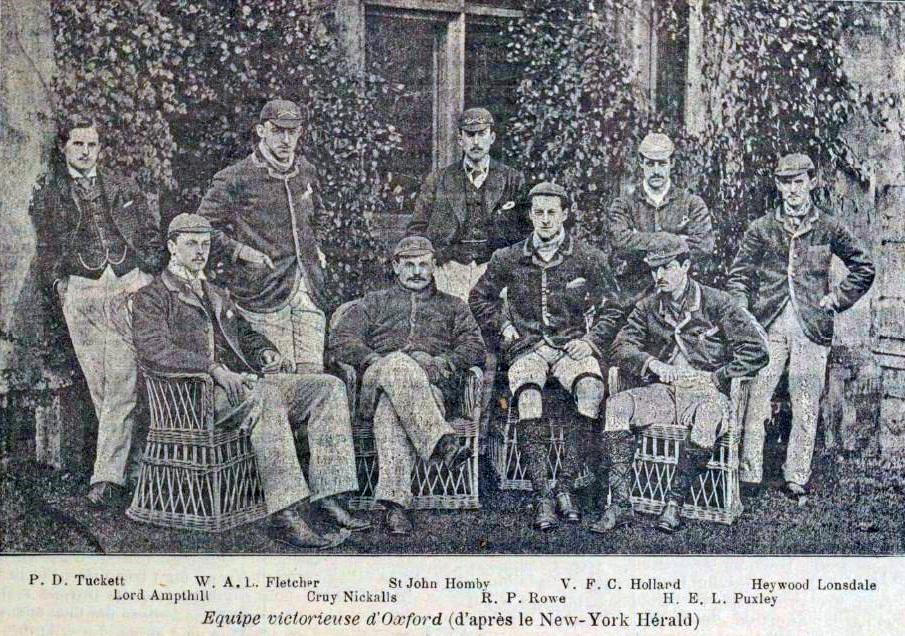
Oxford in 1890 (winner)

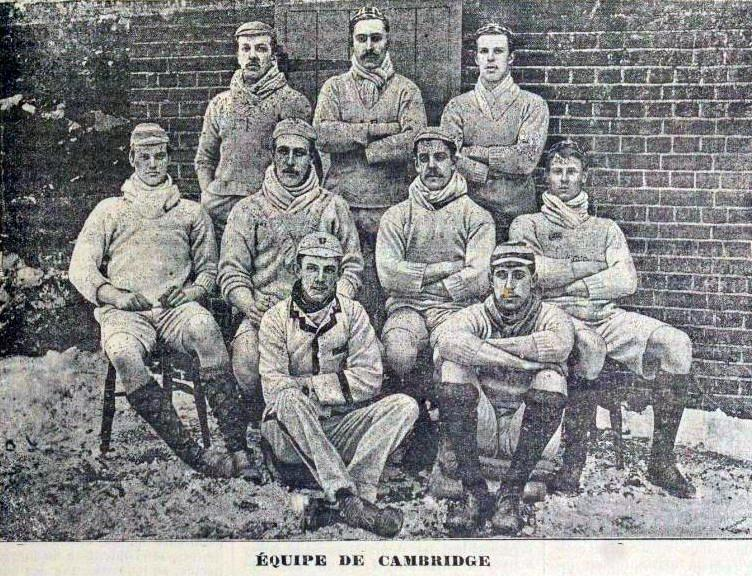
Cambridge in 1890

Both crews weighed an average of 12 st 1.5 lb (76.7 kg). Cambridge saw three former Blues return, including Stanley Muttlebury who was rowing in his fifth consecutive Boat Race. Oxford's crew contained five rowers with experience of the event, including W. F. C. Holland in his fourth race, along with the cox John Pemberton Heywood-Lonsdale who had steered the Dark Blues in 1889.

Seat	Oxford			Cambridge		
Seat	Name	College	Weight	Name	College	Weight
Bow	W. F. C. Holland	Brasenose	11 st 1 lb	G. Elin	3rd Trinity	10 st 9 lb
2	P. S. Tuckett	Trinity	11 st 2 lb	J. M. Sladen	Trinity Hall	11 st 4 lb
3	H. E. L. Puxley	Corpus Christi	11 st 7 lb	E. T. Fison	Corpus Christi	12 st 6.5 lb
4	C. H. St J. Hornby	New College	12 st 5 lb	J. F. Rowlatt	Trinity Hall	11 st 12 lb
5	Lord Ampthill	New College	13 st 5 lb	A. S. Duffield	Trinity Hall	12 st 9 lb
6	G. Nickalls	Magdalen	12 st 10 lb	S. D. Muttlebury	3rd Trinity	13 st 9 lb
7	R. P. P. Rowe	Magdalen	11 st 10 lb	G. Francklyn	3rd Trinity	11 st 12.5 lb
Stroke	W. A. L. Fletcher	Christ Church	13 st 0 lb	J. C. Gardner	Emmanuel	11 st 12.5 lb
Cox	J. P. Heywood-Lonsdale	New College	8 st 0 lb	T. W. Northmore	Queens'	7 st 10.5 lb
Source: (P) – boat club president

== Race ==
The Championship Course, along which the race is conducted

Cambridge were considered slight favourites for the race, and won the toss and elected to start from the Surrey station, handing the Middlesex side of the river to Oxford. While the weather was fine, a westerly wind made for rough conditions between Hammersmith Bridge and Barnes Bridge. Commencing at 4.44 p.m., Cambridge made the faster start, outrating the Dark Blues by two strokes per minute, and held a quarter-of-a-length lead after two minutes. Despite the bend of the river favouring Oxford, the Light Blues held their lead and at the Crab Tree pub, began to pull further ahead as the course favoured them.

By Hammersmith Bridge, the lead was half-a-length but the wind appeared to affect Oxford and by The Doves pub, Cambridge were nearly clear. Oxford reduced the deficit along Chiswick Reach and by Chiswick Steps were nearly level. In more sheltered water, the Dark Blues pushed ahead and were almost clear by Barnes Bridge but Cambridge kept in touch. Oxford passed the finishing post with a lead of one length in a time of 22 minutes 3 seconds. It was Oxford's first victory since the 1885 race, their narrowest winning margin for 23 years and the slowest winning time for either university since the 1878 race.

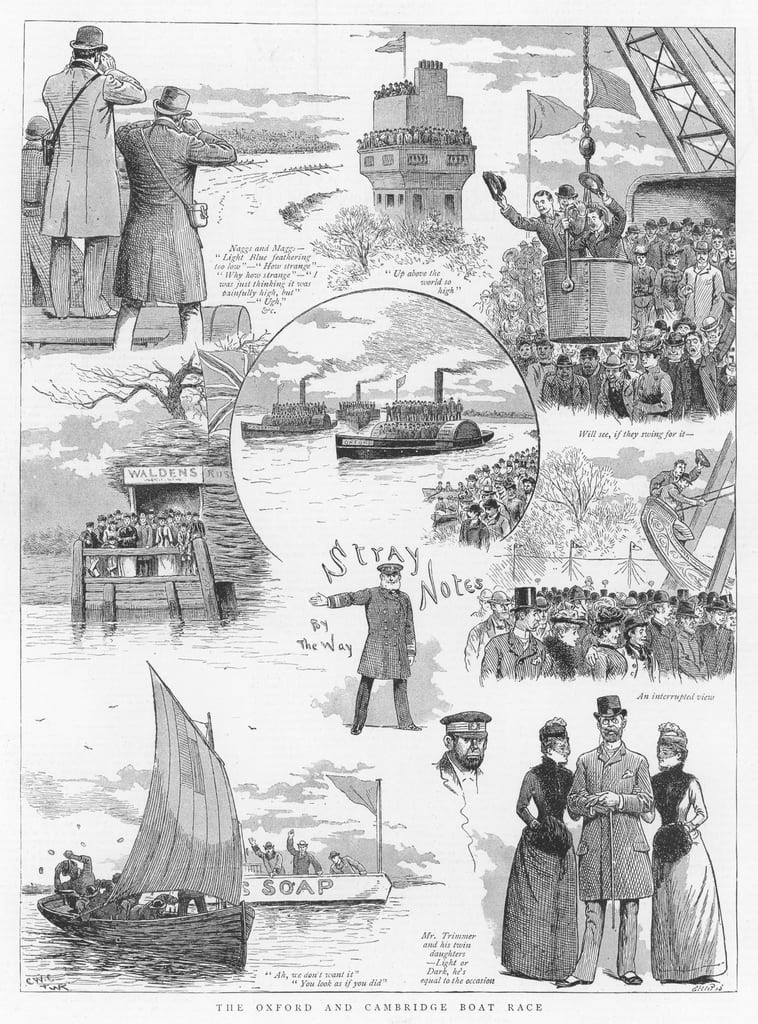
Scenes from The Boat Race. The Graphic 1890
