= The Boat Race 1888 =

45th Boat Race
- Date: 24 March 1888
- Winner: Cambridge
- Margin of victory: 7 lengths
- Winning time: 20 minutes 48 seconds
- Overall record (Cambridge–Oxford): 21–23
- Umpire: Robert Lewis-Lloyd (Cambridge)

The 45th Boat Race took place on 24 March 1888. The Boat Race is an annual side-by-side rowing race between crews from the Universities of Oxford and Cambridge along the River Thames. In the race umpired by Robert Lewis-Lloyd for the final time, Cambridge won by seven lengths in a time of 20 minutes 48 seconds.

== Background ==
The Boat Race is a side-by-side rowing competition between the University of Oxford (sometimes referred to as the "Dark Blues") and the University of Cambridge (sometimes referred to as the "Light Blues"). First held in 1829, the race takes place on the 4.2 miles (6.8 km) Championship Course on the River Thames in southwest London. The rivalry is a major point of honour between the two universities; it is followed throughout the United Kingdom and as of 2014, broadcast worldwide. Cambridge went into the race as reigning champions, having won the previous year's race by 2 1/2 lengths, while Oxford held the overall lead, with 23 victories to Cambridge's 20 (excluding the "dead heat" of 1877).

Oxford's boat club president Hector McLean died of typhoid fever in January 1888 and while the Dark Blues recruited "good men", according to Drinkwater, they also "did not develop into a good crew and were never looked on as possible winners", while Cambridge "had a surplus of excellent material". Oxford's coaches were G. C. Bourne (who had rowed for the Dark Blues in the 1882 and 1883 races, and coached them for the 1885 race), F. P. Bully (who had coached Oxford in 1886 race), and Tom Edwards-Moss (who rowed for the Dark Blues four times between the 1875 and the 1878 races). There is no record of who coached Cambridge. According to Drinkwater, during practice, the weather conditions were "very bad ... rough and stormy, and bitterly cold". He also noted that the Light Blue crew was "undoubtedly one of the fastest that have ever appeared at Putney."

The umpire for the race was Robert Lewis-Lloyd (who had rowed for Cambridge four times between 1856 and 1859) and had umpired every year since the 1881 race.

== Crews ==
The Oxford crew weighed an average of 11 st 13.75 lb (75.9 kg), 1.75 pounds (0.8 kg) more than their opponents. Cambridge saw two former Blues return in Percy Landale and Stanley Muttlebury, the latter of whom was making his third Boat Race appearance. Oxford's crew contained three rowers with experience in the event, including bow W. F. C. Holland, H. R Parker and Guy Nickalls. All competitors in the race were British.

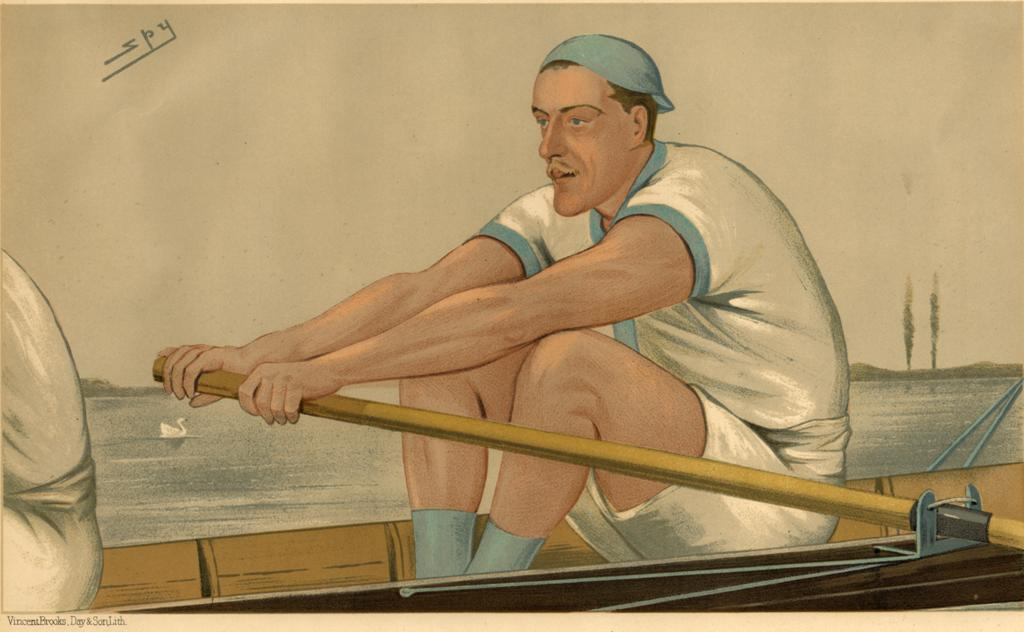
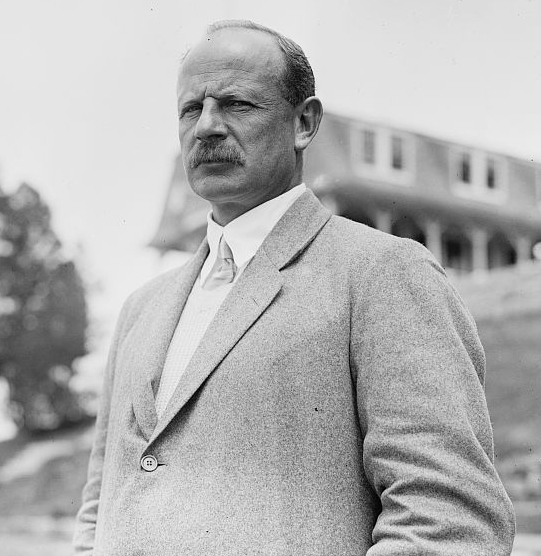
Stanley Muttlebury (caricature left) rowed for Cambridge for the third time, while Guy Nickalls (right) occupied the number seven seat for Oxford.

Seat	Oxford			Cambridge		
Seat	Name	College	Weight	Name	College	Weight
Bow	W. F. C. Holland	Brasenose	11 st 0 lb	R. H. Symonds-Tayler	Trinity Hall	10 st 7 lb
2	A. P. Parker	Magdalen	11 st 11 lb	L. Hannen	Trinity Hall	11 st 1 lb
3	M. E. Bradford	Christ Church	11 st 9 lb	R. H. P. Orde	1st Trinity	11 st 7 lb
4	S. R. Fothergill	New College	12 st 10 lb	C. B. P. Bell	Trinity Hall	12 st 13.5 lb
5	H. Cross	Hertford	13 st 0.5 lb	S. D. Muttlebury (P)	3rd Trinity	13 st 7 lb
6	H. R. Parker (P)	Brasenose	13 st 5 lb	P. Landale	Trinity Hall	12 st 4 lb
7	G. Nickalls	Magdalen	12 st 4 lb	F. H. Maugham	Trinity Hall	11 st 8 lb
Stroke	L. Freere	Brasenose	10 st 0.5 lb	J. C. Gardner	Emmanuel	11 st 7 lb
Cox	A. H. Stewart	New College	7 st 13.5 lb	J. R. Roxburgh	Trinity Hall	8 st 2 lb
Source: (P) – boat club president

== Race ==
The Championship Course, along which the race is conducted

Oxford won the toss and elected to start from the Middlesex station, handing the Surrey side of the river to Cambridge. Commencing at 10.56 a.m., Cambridge took an early lead, and led from the start, holding a six-length lead by Hammersmith Bridge. They extended their lead by a further length to win by seven lengths in a time of 20 minutes 48 seconds. It was their third consecutive victory, and their fourth in five years, and took the overall record to 23–21 in Oxford's favour. The winning time was four seconds quicker than the previous year's race. It was the last time the race was umpired by Lewis-Lloyd, who was replaced the following year by Frank Willan who had rowed for Cambridge four times between the 1866 and 1869 races.
