= James Cardwell Gardner =

English medical doctor and amateur rower

- Born: June 29, 1864; Bunbury, Cheshire, England
- Died: March 25, 1935 (aged 70)
- Occupations: Medical doctor, amateur rower
- Known for: Winner of Diamond Challenge Sculls, Wingfield Sculls; Cambridge University Boat Race rower

James Cardwell Gardner (29 June 1864 – 25 March 1935), also known by his nickname Jumps Gardner, was an English medical doctor and amateur rower who won the Diamond Challenge Sculls at Henley Royal Regatta and the Wingfield Sculls and rowed for Cambridge in the Boat Race in 1888, 1889 and 1890.

Gardner was born at Bunbury, Cheshire, the son of Rev. James Cardwell Gardner, vicar of Butler's Marston Warwickshire. He was educated at Rugby School and Emmanuel College, Cambridge. Gardner won the Colquhoun Sculls in 1886 and the Diamond Challenge Sculls at Henley Royal Regatta in 1887. Cardwell stroked the winning Cambridge crews in the Boat Race in the 1888, 1889 and 1890 races. In 1889, he won the Silver Goblets at Henley and in 1890 he won the Wingfield Sculls. Gardner stroked Leander Club and Thames Rowing Club crews at various regattas and played rugby for the Midland Counties. He was also a boxer and shooting champion.

Gardner became a doctor (MB and BC 1894) and was house physician and resident house surgeon at St George's Hospital. He was later in general practice at Amersham and was Medical Officer of Health for Amersham and justice of the peace for Buckinghamshire. In sporting activities he played association football and golf, captained Amersham cricket team until he was 60 and was secretary of the Old Berkeley Hunt.

Gardner died at Little Kingshill, Great Missenden at the age of 70.

== See also ==
- List of Cambridge University Boat Race crews
