= The Boat Race 1956 =

102nd Boat Race
- Date: 24 March 1956
- Winner: Cambridge
- Margin of victory: 1 and ¼ lengths
- Winning time: 18 minutes 36 seconds
- Overall record (Cambridge–Oxford): 56–45
- Umpire: Kenneth Payne (Cambridge)

The 102nd Boat Race took place on 24 March 1956. Held annually, the Boat Race is a side-by-side rowing race between crews from the Universities of Oxford and Cambridge along the River Thames. In a race umpired by former rower Kenneth Payne, Cambridge won by 1 1/4 lengths in a time of 18 minutes 36 seconds, the fourth-quickest time in the history of the event. The victory took the overall record to 56–45 in their favour.

== Background ==
The Boat Race is a side-by-side rowing competition between the University of Oxford (sometimes referred to as the "Dark Blues") and the University of Cambridge (sometimes referred to as the "Light Blues"). First held in 1829, the race takes place on the 4.2-mile (6.8 km) Championship Course on the River Thames in southwest London. The rivalry is a major point of honour between the two universities; it is followed throughout the United Kingdom and, as of 2014, broadcast worldwide. Cambridge went into the race as reigning champions, having won the 1955 race by sixteen lengths, and led overall with 55 victories to Oxford's 45 (excluding the "dead heat" of 1877).

Cambridge were coached by H. H. Almond (who had rowed for the Light Blues twice, in the 1950 and 1951 races), J. R. F. Best, C. B. M. Lloyd (three-time Light Blue between 1949 and 1951), J. R. Owen (who took part in the race in 1959 and 1960) and H. R. N. Rickett (who rowed three times between 1930 and 1932). Oxford's coaches were A. G. S. Bailey, T. R. M. Bristow, Hugh "Jumbo" Edwards (who had rowed for Oxford in the 1926 and 1930 races), P. Gladstone (who rowed in 1950 and 1952) and A. D. Rowe (who represented the Dark Blues in the 1948 and 1949 races). The race was umpired for the fifth time by the former British Olympian Kenneth Payne, who had rowed for Cambridge in the 1932 and 1934 races.

Both crews experienced a reasonable build-up to the race in favourable conditions. According to the rowing correspondent of The Times, Oxford made gains on Cambridge during this time, although he conceded "it is unlikely that Cambridge are, as yet, unduly worried about the future".

== Crews ==
The Cambridge crew weighed an average of 13 st 2.5 lb (83.5 kg), 7.5 pounds (3.4 kg) per rower more than their opponents. Oxford's crew had two rowers with Boat Race experience, including bow E. V. Vine and number two J. G. McLeod, both of whom were taking part in their third consecutive race. Similarly, Cambridge saw two participants return in M. G. Baynes and K. A. Masser (who was rowing in his third consecutive race). Three of the race participants were registered as non-British, all representing Oxford: Vine, McLeod and Roderick Carnegie were all Australian.

Seat	Oxford			Cambridge		
Seat	Name	College	Weight	Name	College	Weight
Bow	E. V. Vine	Brasenose	11 st 12 lb	J. A. L. Russell	Clare	12 st 4 lb
2	J. G. McLeod (P)	New College	12 st 0 lb	J. F. Hall-Craggs	Lady Margaret Boat Club	12 st 7 lb
3	N. Paine	Trinity	12 st 0 lb	M. J. H. Nightingale	Trinity Hall	13 st 6 lb
4	K. L. Mason	Queen's	12 st 4 lb	A. A. M. Mays-Smith	Trinity Hall	14 st 5.5 lb
5	R. Barrett	Pembroke	14 st 5 lb	I. W. Welsh	Queens'	13 st 2 lb
6	D. A. Cross	Balliol	13 st 4 lb	K. A. Masser (P)	Trinity Hall	13 st 12 lb
7	R. H. Carnegie	New College	13 st 6 lb	M. G. Baynes	Trinity Hall	13 st 3 lb
Stroke	B. S. Mawer	Merton	11 st 12 lb	M. G. Delahooke	Jesus	12 st 11 lb
Cox	B. E. B. K. Venner	St Edmund Hall	9 st 2 lb	J. P. M. Denny	Jesus	10 st 0 lb
Source: (P) – boat club president

== Race ==
The Championship Course along which the Boat Race is contested

Cambridge won the toss and elected to start from the Surrey station, handing the Middlesex side of the river to Oxford. In a south-easterly wind and drizzle, the race was started by umpire Kenneth Payne at 11:30 a.m. Oxford out-rated their opposition for the first minute, averaging 40 strokes per minute to Cambridge's 37, yet after a minute the Light Blues held a half-length lead. With the Dark Blues continuing to stroke faster, the deficit was reduced to a quarter-length by Craven Steps, which was passed in record time. By the Mile Post, and despite pushes from Oxford, the Light Blues were about half a length ahead.

A spurt at Harrods Furniture Depository saw them gain an extra half-length before they passed under Hammersmith Bridge a length and a half ahead of Oxford. Although the Dark Blues were on the outside of the long bend in the river, they kept in touch, and prevented Cambridge from extending their lead. The Light Blues passed Chiswick Steps still with a length and a half lead as both crews faced a head wind going into Corney Reach. Along Dukes Meadows Cambridge started to tire and Oxford began to gain; passing through the arches of Barnes Bridge, the Light Blues held a four-second lead. Increasing their rate to 34 strokes per minute, Oxford's stroke Mawer tried to pull them back into contention yet just as the boats began to overlap, Cambridge pushed on again to win by 1 1/4 lengths in a time of 18 minutes 36 seconds. It was the fastest winning time since the 1934 race and the fourth fastest time in the history of the Boat Race, yet the narrowest winning margin since the 1952 race. It was the Light Blues' second consecutive win, their third win in four years and took the overall record in the race to 56–45 in their favour.

According to the rowing correspondent of The Times, it was "one of the greatest battles in the history of the race". Cambridge's boat club president Masser said "I cannot speak too highly Oxford's magnificent row. We had planned to build up an early lead and then row clean away ... but hard as we tried we could not shake Oxford off our tail."
