= R. C. Lehmann =

English writer and politician (1856–1929)

R.C. Lehmann
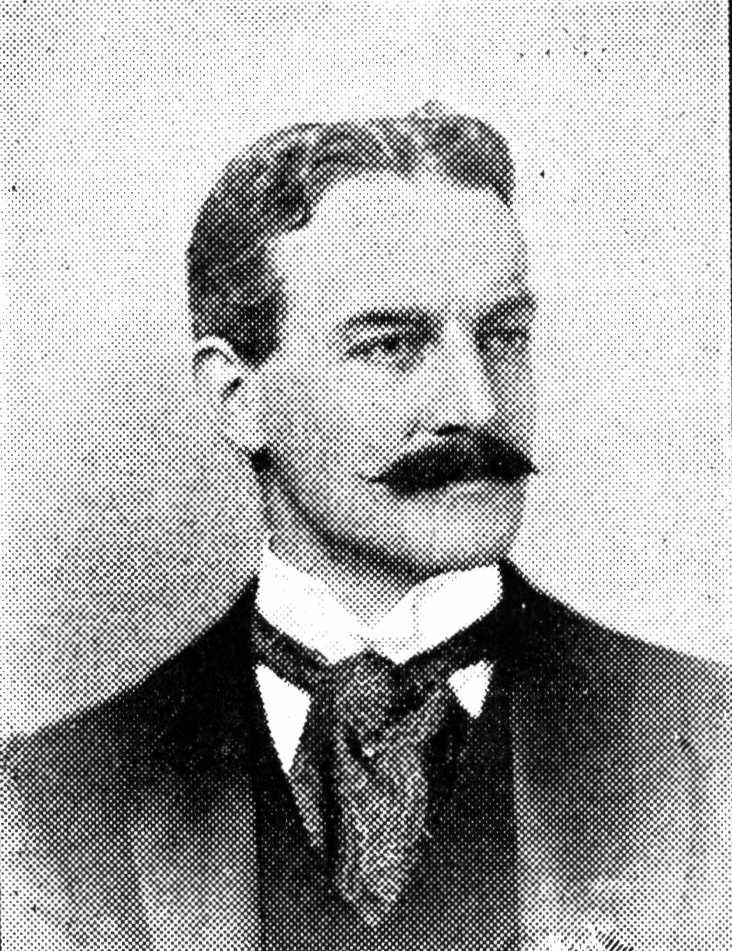
- R.C. Lehmann, from The History of Punch
- Born: Rudolph Chambers Lehmann; 3 January 1856; Ecclesall, South Yorkshire
- Died: 22 January 1929 (aged 73); High Wycombe
- Education: Highgate School; Trinity College, Cambridge
- Occupations: Journalist, editor, and author
- Spouse: Alice Marie Davis
- Children: Helen Lehmann; Rosamond Lehmann; Beatrix Lehmann; John Lehmann
- Parent(s): Frederick Lehmann; Nina Chambers

Rudolph Chambers Lehmann (3 January 1856 – 22 January 1929) was an English writer and Liberal Party politician who sat in the House of Commons from 1906 to 1910. As a writer he was best known for three decades in which he was a major contributor to Punch as well as founding editor of Granta magazine.

== Life and career ==
Lehmann was born in Ecclesall near Sheffield. His father was Augustus Frederick Lehmann, a merchant and steel manufacturer whose brothers Henri and Rudolf were both noted academic artists. His mother, Nina Chambers, was the daughter of the Scottish author and naturalist Robert Chambers. Their social circle included Charles Dickens, George Eliot, Robert Browning, Lord Leighton and other prominent figures.

Lehmann attended Highgate School and Trinity College, Cambridge. He was president of the Cambridge Union Society in 1876. He was also a rower, and captained the First Trinity Boat Club, although in the trial eights for two years, he did not quite make the Cambridge eight. At Henley Royal Regatta he finished last in every heat he entered, from the 1877 Visitors’ to the 1888 Wyfolds.

Lehmann was admitted at the Inner Temple on 6 November 1875 and called to the bar on 21 April 1880. He served on the South Eastern Circuit.

In April 1889, Lehmann began editing the Cambridge undergraduates' magazine Granta and his first contribution to Punch appeared in the 14 December 1889 issue of Punch, a dialogue with the title "Among the Amateurs". More pieces appeared in Punch, such as the series titled "Modern Types", and parodies of well-known contemporary authors under the title of "Mr Punch's Prize Novels", and within four months he had been appointed as one of the editorial staff and regular contributors, his writings for Punch stretching over thirty years, from 1889 to 1919. He wrote perhaps the first series of Sherlock Holmes parodies in Punch from August until early November 1894; they were collected in 1901 as a book entitled The Adventures of Picklock Holes.

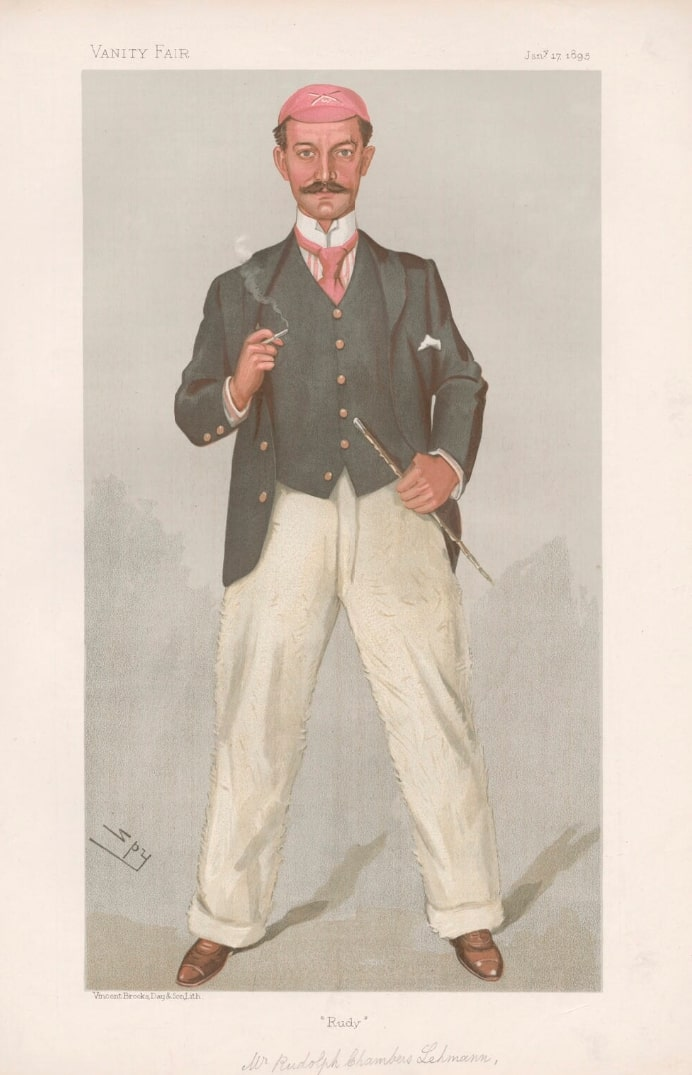
R C Lehmann from Vanity Fair

From 1891 to 1903 Lehmann coached Oxford and Cambridge, generally as a finishing coach for one or the other but in 1892 for both. He also coached at various times Leander, Harvard, Brasenose College Boat Club, Trinity College Dublin, and the Berlin Rowing Club. "It was characteristic of him that he gave his valued services to two countries, three universities, and several colleges besides his own". He was Hon. Sec. of the Amateur Rowing Association from 1893 to 1901 and captain of the Leander Club in 1894 and 1895. He was considered an authority on rowing, about which he wrote a book, The Complete Oarsman, and was the main contributor to Rowing (1898) in The Isthmian Library series.

Lehmann also wrote verse, mostly light and was described as the "Poet Laureate of Rowing". He tried his hand as a lyricist in such works as His Majesty, a comic opera in the Gilbert and Sullivan vein, with music by Alexander Mackenzie, a libretto by F. C. Burnand and additional lyrics by Adrian Ross, presented at the Savoy Theatre in 1897. He was appointed as editor of the Daily News in 1901 following the resignation of Sir John Richard Robinson.

In 1906 Lehmann was elected Member of Parliament (MP) for Harborough which he held until 1910.

He was sketched in A History of Punch by R.G.G. Price as indolent, but able to rouse to write a short piece, and as having given some of that character to the rest of the staff. Other books derived from Punch writing, i.e. The Vagabond and Other Poems from Punch.

Lehmann lived with his family at Bourne End, Buckinghamshire in a large house called Fieldhead. He was a JP for the county. He was High Sheriff of Buckinghamshire in 1901.

Lehmann died in High Wycombe in 1929, aged 73. Married to an American, Alice Marie Davis (1873–1956), his children were Helen Lehmann (1899–1985), the novelist Rosamond Lehmann (1901–1990), the actress Beatrix Lehmann (1903–1979) and the writer and publisher John Lehmann (1907–1987).

Parliament of the United Kingdom
Preceded by Philip Stanhope	Member of Parliament for Harborough; 1906 – Dec. 1910	Succeeded by Paddy Logan
Media offices
Preceded by Edward Tyas Cook	Editor of the Daily News; 1901–1902	Succeeded by Alfred G. Gardiner
