= The Boat Race 1867 =

24th Boat Race
- Date: 13 April 1867
- Winner: Oxford
- Margin of victory: 1/2 length
- Winning time: 22 minutes 39 seconds
- Overall record (Cambridge–Oxford): 10–14
- Umpire: Joseph William Chitty (Oxford)

The 24th Boat Race between crews from the University of Oxford and the University of Cambridge took place on the River Thames on 13 April 1867. In a race where the lead was exchanged several times, Oxford won by half a length in a time of 22 minutes and 39 seconds. The victory took the overall record to 14–10 in Oxford's favour.

== Background ==
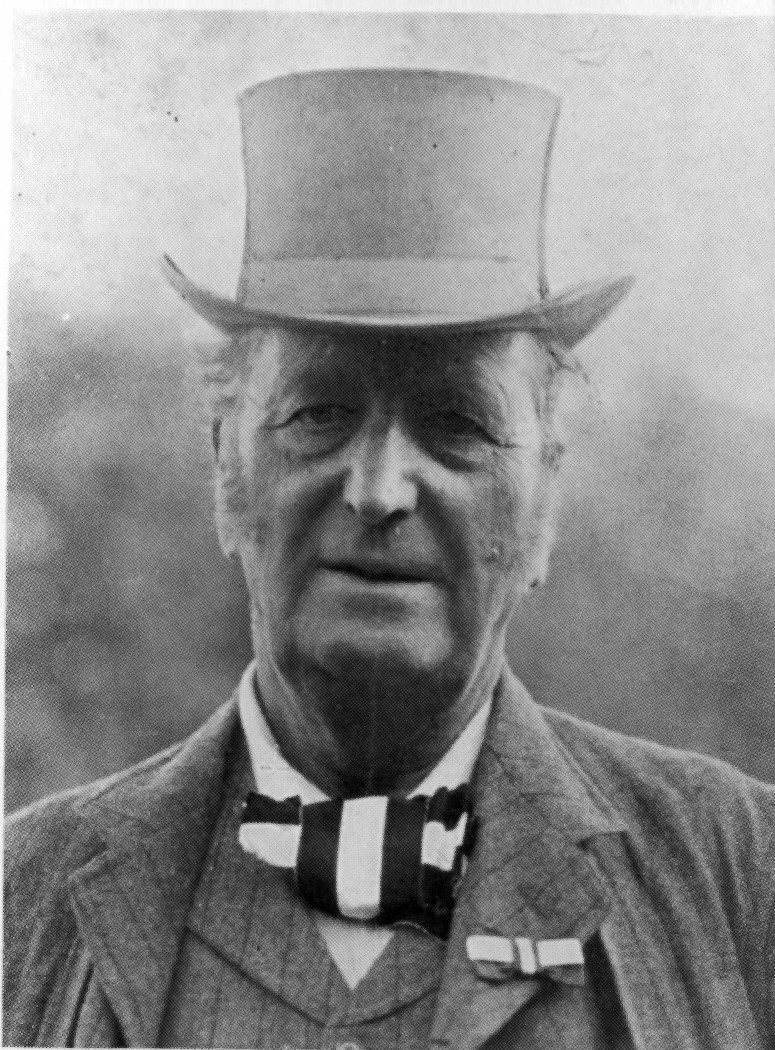
Walter Bradford Woodgate coached the Oxford crew.

The Boat Race is a side-by-side rowing competition between the University of Oxford (sometimes referred to as the "Dark Blues") and the University of Cambridge (sometimes referred to as the "Light Blues"). The race was first held in 1829, and since 1845 has taken place on the 4.2-mile (6.8 km) Championship Course on the River Thames in southwest London. Oxford went into the race as reigning champions, having defeated Cambridge by three lengths in the previous year's race and led overall with thirteen wins to Cambridge's ten.

Cambridge, according to The Field were "as nearly fit to row as possible ... their rowing was really a pleasure to behold". They were coached by Rev. W. Maule (who had rowed for Cambridge at the Henley Royal Regatta in 1847) and D. F. Steavenson (who had rowed in the Boat Race in the 1864 and 1865 races). Walter Bradford Woodgate, who had rowed for Oxford in the 1862 and 1863 races, and George Morrison, former Oxford University Boat Club president who had rowed three times between the 1859 and 1861 race, coached the Dark Blue crew. Although Cambridge arrived at Putney in very good form, it was considered to their disadvantage because, according to Drinkwater, "no crew can be kept at the top of its form for more than a few days". During practice runs, Oxford demonstrated they could outpace Cambridge, but with Frank Willan suffering from a boil, Oxford's stroke was instructed to keep the rating low for the race. The race was umpired by Joseph William Chitty who had rowed for Oxford twice in 1849 (in the March and December races) and the 1852 race, while the starter was Edward Searle.

== Crews ==
The Oxford crew weighed an average of 12 st 0.5 lb (76.2 kg), 2.5 pounds (1.1 kg) per rower more than their opponents; for the first time in the race history, a crew weighed more than an average of 12 st (76.0 kg). The Oxford crew saw the cox Charles Tottenham make his fourth Boat Race appearance and three rowers return, including Willan who was competing for the third time. Five former Blues returned for Cambridge, with William Griffiths and Herbert Watney making their third appearance in the event. According to a report in The Times, "sixteen finer or better trained young men it would have been difficult to find in England".

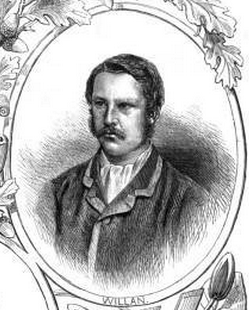
Frank Willan rowed at number seven for Oxford.

Seat	Cambridge			Oxford		
Seat	Name	College	Weight	Name	College	Weight
Bow	W. H. Anderson	1st Trinity	11 st 0 lb	W. P. Bowman	University	10 st 11 lb
2	J. M. Collard	Lady Margaret	11 st 4 lb	J. H. Fish	University	12 st 1 lb
3	J. U. Bourke	1st Trinity	12 st 9 lb	E. S. Carter	Worcester	11 st 12 lb
4	Hon. J. H. Gordon	1st Trinity	12 st 3 lb	W. W. Wood	University	12 st 6 lb
5	F. E. Cunningham	King's	12 st 12 lb	J. C. Tinné	University	13 st 4 lb
6	J. Still	Gonville and Caius	11 st 12 lb	F. Crowder	Brasenose	11 st 11 lb
7	H. Watney	Lady Margaret	11 st 0 lb	F. Willan (P)	Exeter	12 st 3 lb
Stroke	W. R. Griffiths (P)	3rd Trinity	12 st 0 lb	R. G. Mardsen	Merton	11 st 11 lb
Cox	A. Forbes	Lady Margaret	8 st 2 lb	C. R. W. Tottenham	Christ Church	8 st 8 lb
Source: (P) – boat club president

== Race ==
The Championship Course along which the Boat Race is contested

According to the Oxford Book, the weather on the morning of the race was "filthy ... raining and blowing like anything." Oxford won the toss and elected to start from the Middlesex station, handing the Surrey side of the river to Cambridge. The race commenced shortly before 9 am, with Cambridge making the better start. Oxford slowly drew back into contention and the crews rowed side by side towards Hammersmith Bridge, by which point the Light Blues held a length's lead. Beyond the bridge, Oxford began to close the gap once again, and lead was exchanged twice before Barnes Bridge. Following a number of spurts from both crews, Cambridge appeared to be exhausted, allowing Oxford the advantage, winning the race by half a length. It was Oxford's seventh consecutive victory and took the overall record to 14–10 in their favour.
