= The Boat Race 1868 =

25th Boat Race
- Date: 4 April 1868
- Winner: Oxford
- Margin of victory: 6 lengths
- Winning time: 20 minutes 56 seconds
- Overall record (Cambridge–Oxford): 10–15
- Umpire: Joseph William Chitty (Oxford)

The 25th Boat Race between crews from the University of Oxford and the University of Cambridge took place on the River Thames on 4 April 1868. Oxford won by six lengths in a time of 20 minutes and 56 seconds, taking the overall record to 15–10 in their favour. Oxford cox Charles Tottenham became the first person in the history of the event to win five Boat Races, and Cambridge saw their first non-British rower compete.

== Background ==
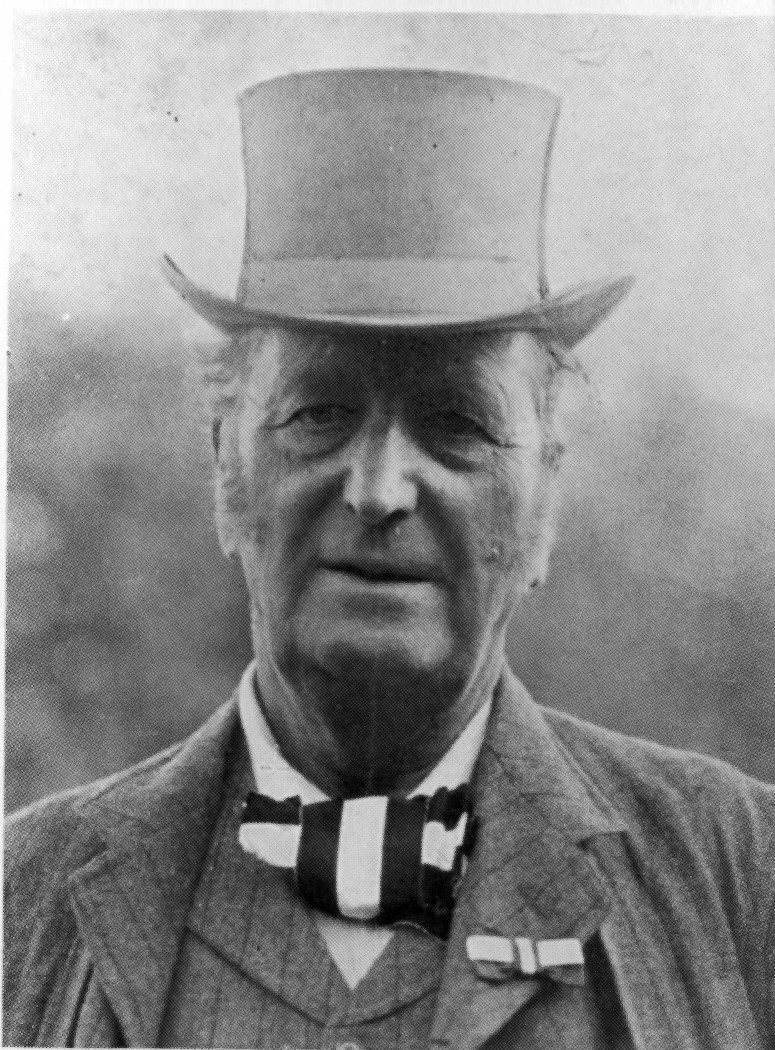
Walter Bradford Woodgate coached the Oxford crew.

The Boat Race is a side-by-side rowing competition between the University of Oxford (sometimes referred to as the "Dark Blues") and the University of Cambridge (sometimes referred to as the "Light Blues"). The race was first held in 1829, and since 1845 has taken place on the 4.2-mile (6.8 km) Championship Course on the River Thames in southwest London. Oxford went into the race as reigning champions, having defeated Cambridge by half a length in the previous year's race and led overall with fourteen wins to Cambridge's ten.

In February 1868, former Cambridge Blue Hon J. H. Gordon was found fatally wounded in his room from an accidentally self-inflicted gun discharge. This resulted in Cambridge University Boat Club president John Still requesting that the usual challenge, which had been sent to Oxford in the Lent term, be rescinded. According to MacMichael, the response was "very unsympathetic" in tone and therefore the challenge stood and was accepted: the universities would race.

Cambridge were coached for a week each by John Bourke (who had rowed in the unsuccessful crews of the 1866 and 1867 races) and the former boat club president William Griffiths (who had represented the Light Blues three times between the 1865 and 1867 races). Thomas Selby Egan coached the Cantabrigians for the three weeks preceding the race. Oxford were coached by E. F. Henley (who rowed in 1865 and 1866), the former Oxford University Boat Club president G. Morrison, R. W. Risley (who rowed four times between the 1857 and 1860 races) and Walter Bradford Woodgate (who rowed in the 1862 and 1863 races. The race was umpired by Joseph William Chitty who had rowed for Oxford twice in 1849 (in the March and December races) and the 1852 race, while the starter was Edward Searle and the finishing judge was John Phelps. Despite the weeks of training, Cambridge did not arrive at Putney in a "state in which a University crew is expected to be." Conversely, according to Oxford's Frank Willan, the Dark Blues "made great progress during the last week" and "came to the post eventually very fit."

== Crews ==
The Cambridge crewed weighed an average of 11 st 11.875 lb (75.1 kg), just 0.25 pounds (0.1 kg) more than their opponents. Oxford's crew contained four returning Blues, including cox Charles Tottenham who was competing in his fifth consecutive Boat Race, and Frank Willan who had rowed in the Dark Blues' successful races the previous two years. The Cambridge crew included two rowers with Boat Race experience: William Anderson and John Still, the latter making his third Boat Race appearance. The Light Blue cox, Thomas Warner, was the first registered non-British competitor to represent the university, having studied at Melbourne Church of England Grammar School in Australia before becoming an alumnus of Trinity Hall.

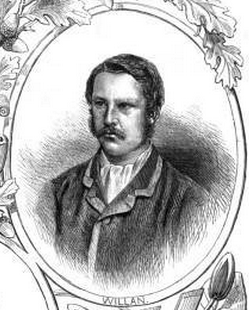
Frank Willan was Oxford University Boat Club president and rowed at number six for the Dark Blues.

Seat	Cambridge			Oxford		
Seat	Name	College	Weight	Name	College	Weight
Bow	W. H. Anderson	1st Trinity	11 st 2 lb	W. D. Benson	Balliol	10 st 13 lb
2	J. P. Nicholls	3rd Trinity	11 st 3 lb	A. C. Yarborough	Lincoln	11 st 8 lb
3	J. G. Wood	Emmanuel	12 st 6 lb	R. S. Ross of Bladensburg	Exeter	11 st 8 lb
4	W. H. Lowe	Christ's	12 st 4 lb	R. G. Mardsen	Merton	11 st 13 lb
5	H. T. Nadin	Pembroke	12 st 11 lb	J. C. Tinné	University	13 st 7 lb
6	W. F. MacMichael	Downing	12 st 1.5 lb	F. Willan (P)	Exeter	12 st 5 lb
7	J. Still (P)	Gonville and Caius	12 st 1 lb	E. S. Carter	Worcester	11 st 8 lb
Stroke	W. J. Pickney	1st Trinity	10 st 10 lb	S. D. Darbishire	Balliol	11 st 3 lb
Cox	T. D. Warner	Trinity Hall	8 st 4 lb	C. R. W. Tottenham	Christ Church	8 st 7 lb
Source: (P) – boat club president

== Race ==
The Championship Course along which the Boat Race is contested

Around 11 a.m., Oxford departed from the London Rowing Club boathouse, while Cambridge left from Leander Club in order to head to the start. Cambridge had won the toss and elected to start from the Middlesex station, handing the Surrey side of the river to Oxford. As a result of a number of boats moored on the north bank of the river, the tide which would have assisted the Light Blues was substantially blocked. Cambridge made a good start, leading by half a length by the London Rowing Club boathouse. Oxford responded, and passing Leander, they had reduced the deficit to one third of a length. Rowing past Craven Cottage, the Dark Blues were marginally ahead, despite a push from Cambridge. Despite questionable steering in conditions described as having "prevailing haze", Oxford maintained a lead of around half a length by the Crab Tree pub.

The Dark Blues had extended their lead to a length by the soap works before shooting Hammersmith Bridge two lengths ahead. Although river traffic diverted the Cambridge boat, they remained in contention, two lengths behind Oxford. At Barnes Bridge, the Dark Blues were a further length ahead, and continued to extend their lead until the flag-boat, which they passed six lengths ahead in a time of 20 minutes 56 seconds. Oxford's victory, their eighth in a row, took their overall lead to 15–10 in the event. Willan paid tribute to his cox: "In conclusion, I must again testify to the splendid steering of Tottenham, who for the fifth and I am sorry to say for the last time has contributed mainly to our victory over Cambridge."
