= The Boat Race 1869 =

26th Boat Race
- Date: 17 March 1869
- Winner: Oxford
- Margin of victory: 3 lengths
- Winning time: 20 minutes 4 seconds
- Overall record (Cambridge–Oxford): 10–16
- Umpire: Joseph William Chitty (Oxford)

The 26th Boat Race between crews from the University of Oxford and the University of Cambridge took place on the River Thames on 17 March 1869. Oxford won by three lengths in a time of 20 minutes and 4 seconds. It was their ninth consecutive victory and was, at that point, the fastest time ever recorded in the event.

== Background ==
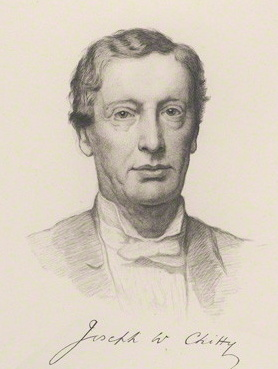
Joseph William Chitty was the umpire.

The Boat Race is a side-by-side rowing competition between the University of Oxford (sometimes referred to as the "Dark Blues") and the University of Cambridge (sometimes referred to as the "Light Blues"). The race was first held in 1829, and since 1845 has taken place on the 4.2-mile (6.8 km) Championship Course on the River Thames in southwest London. Oxford went into the race as reigning champions, having defeated Cambridge by six lengths in the previous year's race and led overall with fifteen wins to Cambridge's ten.

Having lost the last eight Boat Races, the Cambridge University Boat Club president William Anderson wrote to G. Morrison of Balliol College, Oxford, inviting him to coach the trials eights and the University eight. Morrison had rowed in the 1859, 1860 and 1861 races and had also acted as a non-rowing president for the 1862 race. The decision to engage a member of the opposing university was greeted with consternation and considered by many Cantabrigians as "a disgrace to the Club". Indeed, five Old Blues refused to row, only William MacMIchael agreed to row again. After the usual difficulty to agree arrangements, Cambridge eventually sent the traditional challenge and the date of the race was set for 17 March 1869. Cambridge arrived at Putney a fortnight beforehand and made several practice rows in variable conditions, the worst of which included heavy snow, three days prior to the race.

The race was umpired by Joseph William Chitty who had rowed for Oxford twice in 1849 (in the March and December races) and the 1852 race, while the starter was Edward Searle.

== Crews ==
The Oxford crewed weighed an average of 12 st 0.25 lb (76.1 kg), 2.125 pounds (1.0 kg) more than their opponents. The Cambridge crew contained three returning Blues, William MacMichael, William Anderson (for his third Boat Race) and John Still (his fourth), while Oxford saw the return of five rowers, including their boat club president J. C. Tinné for his third appearance and Frank Willan in his fourth Boat Race.

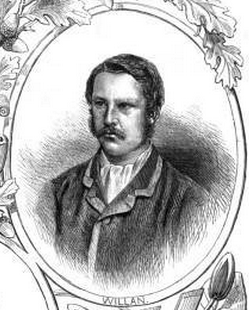
Frank Willan made his fourth appearance for Oxford in the Boat Race.

Seat	Cambridge			Oxford		
Seat	Name	College	Weight	Name	College	Weight
Bow	J. A. Rushton	Emmanuel	11 st 5 lb	S. H. Woodhouse	University	10 st 13.5 lb
2	J. H. Ridley	Jesus	11 st 10.5 lb	R. Tahourdin	St John's	11 st 11 lb
3	J. W. Dale	Lady Margaret	11 st 12 lb	T. S. Baker	Queen's	12 st 8 lb
4	F. J. Young	Christ's	12 st 4 lb	F. Willan	Exeter	12 st 2.5 lb
5	W. F. MacMichael	Downing	12 st 4 lb	J. C. Tinné (P)	University	12 st 10.5 lb
6	W. H. Anderson (P)	1st Trinity	11 st 4 lb	A. C. Yarborough	Lincoln	11 st 11 lb
7	J. Still	Gonville and Caius	12 st 1 lb	W. D. Benson	Balliol	11 st 7 lb
Stroke	J. H. D. Goldie	Lady Margaret	12 st 1 lb	S. D. Darbishire	Balliol	11 st 8.5 lb
Cox	H. E. Gordon	1st Trinity	7 st 8 lb	D. A Neilson	St John's	7 st 10.5 lb
Source: (P) – boat club president

== Race ==
The Championship Course, along which the race is conducted

According to The Field, "the weather was not the most agreeable for a boat-race ... a raw wind ... leaden-coloured clouds overhanging the river". Oxford, who were strong pre-race favourites, won the toss and elected to start from the Middlesex station, handing the Surrey station to Cambridge. Although the Light Blues made the faster start, Oxford soon pulled alongside them and by the London Rowing Club boathouse, held a lead of around 10 feet (3 m). Cambridge closed the gap but Oxford pulled away again. The lead was exchanged once again and Oxford took the lead at Craven Cottage. Despite erratic steering from Oxford's cox Darbishire, Oxford held the advantage until the crews shot Hammersmith Bridge, at which point the Light Blues held the lead by one third of a length.

Still in the lead by The Doves pub, Cambridge steered too close to the bank and allowed Oxford to close the gap and passed Chiswick Eyot in the lead, with a half-length advantage by Chiswick Church. The Dark Blues passed under Barnes Bridge with a two-length lead and completed the course, passing the Ship Tavern three lengths clear in a time of 20 minutes 4 seconds. It was their ninth consecutive victory and took the overall record to 16–10 in their favour. The winning time was the fastest ever, beating the previous record set in 1868 by 52 seconds, although some doubt was cast over the positioning of the finish which was believed to have made the course approximately 100 yards (91 m) shorter. The record would stand until the 1873 race.
