= Frank Willan (rower) =

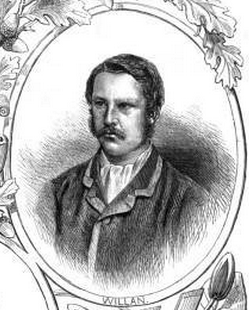
Willan, in a wood engraving of about 1870

Frank Willan (8 February 1846 – 22 March 1931) was an English rower and Militia officer who rowed for Oxford in four winning Boat Race crews and umpired the race between 1889 and 1902. He was also a yachtsman and one of the founders of the Royal Yachting Association, an alderman, a Deputy Lieutenant for Hampshire, an early motorist, and a military historian.

During the First World War, when aged nearly seventy, he drove military lorries on the Western Front in France.

== Early life ==
Willan was the only son of John James Willan (1799–1869) and his wife Jane Onslow, who was herself a granddaughter of Colonel George Onslow MP, first cousin of George Onslow, 1st Earl of Onslow. He was educated at Eton College and Exeter College, Oxford. At Eton, he was a 'wet bob' and rowed at stroke.

== Career ==
Willan went up to Oxford as a member of Exeter College. There, he rowed for Oxford in its winning Boat Race crews in four successive years, in 1866, 1867, 1868 and 1869. In 1867 he was also in the winning Oxford Etonian crew in the Grand Challenge Cup at Henley Royal Regatta and runner up in the Diamond Challenge Sculls. In the same year, 1867, he gave evidence in a legal dispute over the starting of a sculls race on the Thames. In 1869, he was President of the Oxford University Boat Club.

In 1869 Willan won the Grand at Henley with Oxford Etonian again. In August of the same year, he rowed at bow in an Oxford coxed four race against Harvard on the Tideway, Harvard's first race in England.

In 1878, as one of a group of "old amateurs whose ideas were universally respected", Willan took part under the chairmanship of Francis Playford in the drawing up of the definition of an amateur for the purposes of the sport of rowing.

From 1883 to 1889 he was honorary Treasurer of the Winchester Diocesan Society. In 1888, following the death of an oarsman, Willan wrote to The Times to propose that in bumping races a leather pad should be fixed to the nose of eight-oared boats.

Willan was commissioned as a lieutenant in the Oxfordshire Militia on 26 April 1873, and was promoted to captain on 23 June 1875. In the Childers Reforms of the British Army in 1881, the Oxfordshire Militia became the 4th Battalion, Oxfordshire Light Infantry. He was made an honorary major on 5 May 1888, and substantive major on 19 December 1891. He became an honorary lieutenant-colonel on 10 May 1893, and substantive lieutenant-colonel on 13 January 1902, also taking command of the battalion. He was promoted honorary colonel on 13 September 1902. He retired, with permission to retain his rank, and continue wearing uniform, on 17 February 1906.

Willan lived at Burley Manor, Ringwood, and Thornehill Park, Bitterne, Hampshire, and was an alderman for Hampshire, a Justice of the Peace and was appointed a Deputy Lieutenant for the county on 26 May 1904. In Hampshire, he was a breeder of Jersey cattle. Willan also umpired the Boat Race from 1889 to 1902. In 1894, the future King George V rode in the launch with him. Willan also awarded the prizes at Henley in 1897.

He went on to become a yachtsman and was one of the founders of the Yacht Racing Association (later the Royal Yachting Association), and was a member of its council for fifteen years. He was also active as a sea fisherman off the coast of Dorset. He was also a motorist in the very early days of the new sport, and in 1903 represented fellow motorists in discussions on the use of Hampshire roads. In 1908, he owned a 6-cylinder 28-horsepower Lanchester.

Willan married Louisa Margaret Anne Douglas, daughter of Captain C. R. G. Douglas, late the 32nd Bengal Light Infantry, and stepdaughter of John Prideaux Lightfoot, Rector of Exeter College, Oxford, in the college chapel on 14 January 1875. They had two sons and two daughters. Both sons became brigadiers, Frank Godfrey Willan CMG DSO, and Robert Hugh Willan DSO MC. Their grandchildren included Group Captain Frank Andrew Willan, RAF.

During the First World War, when aged nearly 70, Willan drove military lorries for the British Expeditionary Force in France. He was later appointed to the local appeal tribunal, created on the introduction of conscription under the Military Service Act 1916.

He died on 22 March 1931, and his bequests included £150 to his gardener. A memorial was placed in Winchester Cathedral "by Mrs. Willan, Col. F. G. Willan, and other members of the family".

== Publication ==
In 1900, Willan published an account of his old regiment, A History of the Oxfordshire Regiment of Militia (fourth Battalion Oxfordshire Light Infantry) 1778–1900. A new edition of this appeared in 2009.

== See also ==
- List of Oxford University Boat Race crews
