= The Boat Race 1866 =

23rd Boat Race
- Date: 24 March 1866
- Winner: Oxford
- Margin of victory: 3 lengths
- Winning time: 25 minutes 35 seconds
- Overall record (Cambridge–Oxford): 10–13
- Umpire: Joseph William Chitty (Oxford)

The 23rd Boat Race took place on the River Thames on 24 March 1866. The Boat Race is a side-by-side rowing race between crews from the Universities of Oxford and Cambridge. Oxford won by three lengths in a time of 25 minutes and 35 seconds, one of the slowest times in the history of the event.

== Background ==
The Boat Race is a side-by-side rowing competition between the University of Oxford (sometimes referred to as the "Dark Blues") and the University of Cambridge (sometimes referred to as the "Light Blues"). The race was first held in 1829, and since 1845 has taken place on the 4.2-mile (6.8 km) Championship Course on the River Thames in southwest London. Oxford entered the race as reigning champions, having defeated Cambridge by four lengths in the previous year's race. Oxford led overall with twelve wins to Cambridge's ten.

In late 1865, the Cambridge University Boat Club president Robert Kinglake wrote to Oxford in order to draw up rules on the seniority of participants in the Boat Race, asserting that Cambridge could not agree to send out a challenge unless this agreement was made. The proposal included the suggestion that "no pass or πολλ man may row after one year has elapsed from the date of him having passed his final examination. That no honour man may row after the end of his fourth year from the date of his commencing residence." While both universities were agreed with regard to the exclusion of those reading "ordinary" degrees (also referred to as "pass" degrees, as opposed to honours degrees), Oxford rejected the second clause which would have potentially excluded a small number of rowers given the differences in timetables between the universities.

Despite the disagreement, Kinglake sent the traditional challenge to Oxford who accepted. Cambridge went to Putney ten days before the race which was scheduled for 24 March, while Oxford practised there for eight days. The Light Blues rowed against a London Rowing Club eight in the buildup while the Dark Blues took on a watermen eight and a Kingston eight during their preparations. The race was umpired by Joseph William Chitty who had rowed for Oxford twice in 1849 (in the March and December races) and the 1852 race, while the starter was Edward Searle.

== Crews ==
The two crews were nearly identical in weight: the average of the Cambridge crew was 11 st 12.875 lb (75.5 kg), 0.125 pounds (0.1 kg) per rower more than Oxford. Each crew saw the return of five former Blues, including the Light Blue number six Robert Kinglake who was rowing in his fourth Boat Race; Dark Blues Robert Taunton Raikes, Brown and Charles Tottenham were making their third Boat Race appearance.

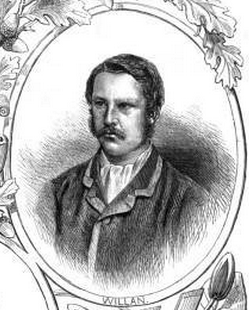
Frank Willan rowed at number four for Oxford.

Seat	Cambridge			Oxford		
Seat	Name	College	Weight	Name	College	Weight
Bow	J. Still	Gonville and Caius	11 st 6 lb	R. T. Raikes	Merton	11 st 0 lbs
2	J. R. Selwyn	3rd Trinity	11 st 6 lb	F. Crowder	Brasenose	11 st 11 lb
3	J. U. Bourke	1st Trinity	12 st 3 lb	W. Freeman	Merton	12 st 7 lb
4	J. Fortescue	Magdalene	12 st 2.5 lb	F. Willan	Exeter	12 st 2 lb
5	D. F. Steavenson	Trinity Hall	12 st 5 lb	E. F. Henley	Oriel	13 st 0 lb
6	R. A. Kinglake (P)	3rd Trinity	12 st 9 lb	W. W. Wood	University	12 st 4 lb
7	H. Watney	Lady Margaret	10 st 11 lb	H. P. Senhouse	Christ Church	11 st 3 lb
Stroke	W. R. Griffiths	3rd Trinity	11 st 9 lb	M. Brown (P)	Trinity	11 st 5 lb
Cox	A. Forbes	Lady Margaret	8 st 0 lb	C. R. W. Tottenham	Christ Church	7 st 13 lb
Source: (P) – boat club president

== Race ==
The Championship Course along which the Boat Race is contested

Oxford won the toss for the fifth consecutive year and elected to start on the Middlesex side of the river, handing the Surrey station to Cambridge, despite the advantage being "nullified ... for there was a strong wind blowing from the south-west." According to The Field, "arrangements had been made by the Thames Conservancy Board, which had most effectually put a stopper" on disruption from paddle boats to allow an uninterrupted start at 7.48 a.m. Oxford led from the start but Cambridge redressed the balance and were half a length ahead by the time the crews shot Hammersmith Bridge. They maintained their lead to Chiswick Eyot and despite rough water, Cambridge continued in front. Avoiding a barge at Corny Reach, the Light Blues allowed their opponents to pass and take a half-length lead which Oxford took to Barnes Bridge. Even though Cambridge made a push, even drawing level, Oxford pulled away and won by three lengths in a time of 25 minutes and 35 seconds. It was the third-slowest time in the history of the event on the Championship Course.
