= Bow (position) =

Rower seated closest to the bow of a boat

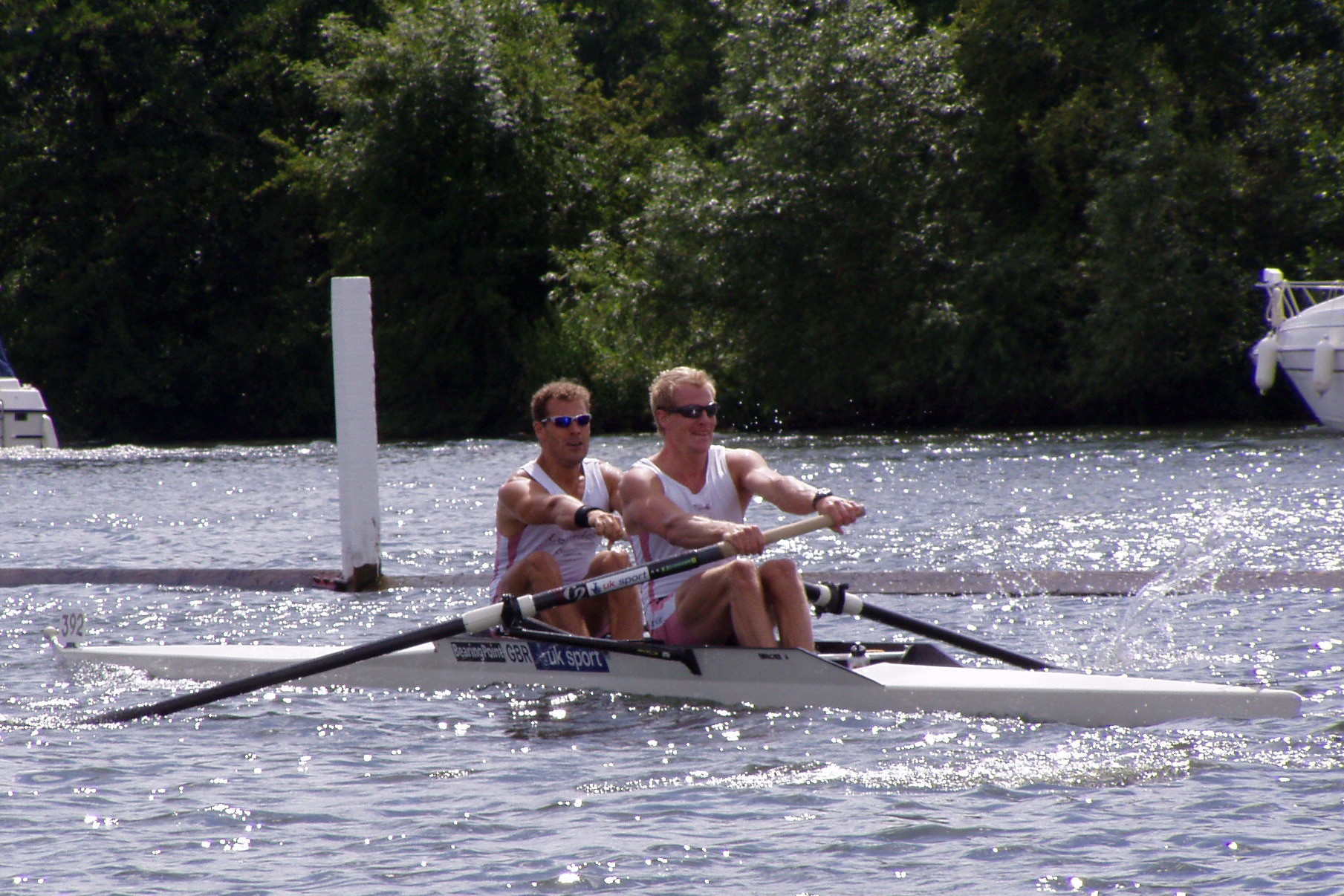
In this picture of a coxless pair, the rower on the left of the photo and closest to the bow of the boat is the "bow" rower and is rowing "bowside" or "starboard"

In rowing, the bow (or bow woman or bowman or bowperson) is the rower seated closest to the bow of the boat, which is the forward part of the boat. The other end of the boat is called the stern, and the rower seated there is called the stroke. In a bow-coxed boat, the coxswain is closest to the boat's bow, but the rower closest to the bow is still considered the "bow."

== Bow seat ==
When the boat has more than one rower, the rower closest to the bow of the boat is known as "bow". In coxless boats, bow is usually the person who keeps an eye on the water behind themselves to avoid accidents. The rower at the opposite end of the boat is referred to as stroke.

== Bow side ==
Bow side refers to the starboard side of the boat which is on the right hand side of a cox facing forwards but on the left-hand side of a rower facing backwards. The usage derives from the tradition of having the bow rower's oar be on the starboard or right side of the boat.

In Cornish pilot gigs, the bow rower's oar is on the port left side and therefore bow side refers to the port side of the boat.
