= New College Boat Club =

British rowing club in Oxford

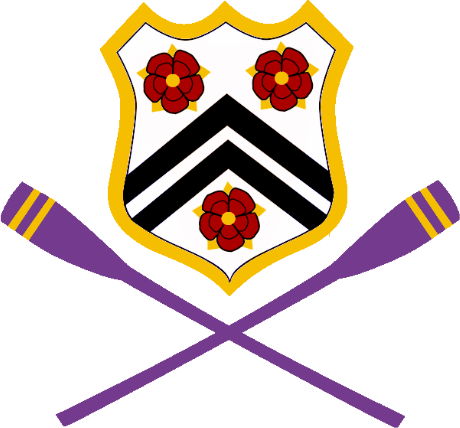
Shield
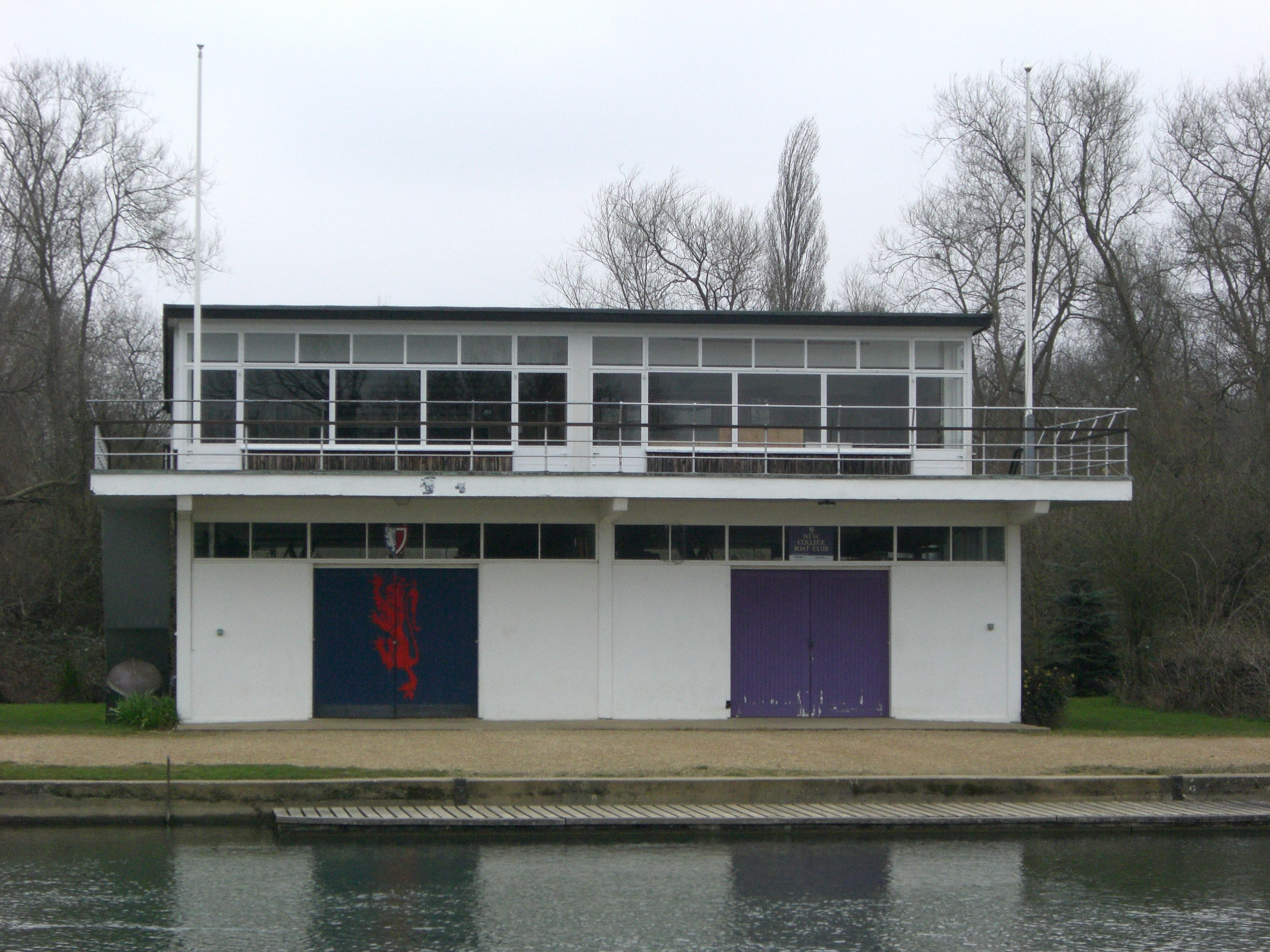

- New College Boathouse (right half) and rowing blade
- Location: Boathouse Island
- Coordinates: 51.74290°N 1.24910°W
- Home water: River Thames (known in Oxford as the Isis)
- Founded: 1840
- Key people: Bhargava Govardhana (President); Oscar Archibald, Archie Mathers (Men's Captains); Nora Miles, Barbara Tyler (Women's Captains); Ruairí O'Grady, Elliot Scope (Men's Vice Captains); Victoria Burchett, Elizabeth Kemmish (Women's Vice Captains)
- Head of the River: Men: 1887, 1896-99, 1901, 1903, 1904, 1911-13, 1921, 1922, 1937, 1950, 1986; Women: 2004, 2005
- University: University of Oxford
- Colours
- Affiliations: British Rowing (boat code NEC); King's College BC (Sister college)
- Website: www.newcollegeboatclub.co.uk

New College Boat Club (NCBC) is the rowing club for members of New College, Oxford. The club's existence can be dated to 1840 when it first raced on The Isis in Oxford.

The club shares a boathouse on The Isis (part of the Thames) with Balliol College Boat Club, as well as using boat racks at Godstow for the Men's and Women's first boats.

== History ==
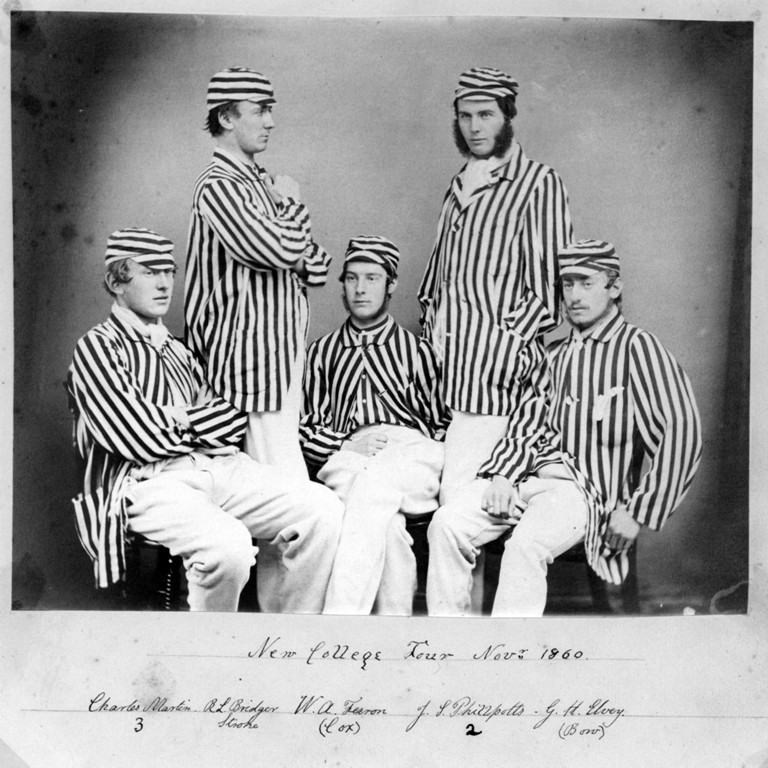
A New College IV in rowing blazers in 1860

New College's initial presence and performance in college bumps racing was poor, in part because the college was one of the smallest in Oxford. Their first recorded Summer Eights campaign in 1840 started and ended at the bottom of the bumps chart ('footship'), and involved several days where the college failed to put out a crew. Following this, New College entered a boat in just two of the following 23 years of Eights, despite a rule that permitted them and other weaker colleges to form composite crews.

This changed in the 1860s, when New College entered crews for every Eights campaign from 1864 to 1867 and 1869 onwards. Their fortunes were initially somewhat erratic; the club might fall or rise as many as seven spots in a given year (Eights consisted of eight days of racing until 1878 and six days thereafter). However, a rapid ascent in the Torpids chart from footship in 1875 to headship in 1882 indicated the club's changing fortunes. A few years later, Eights performance also stabilised at a high level, when NCBC climbed to third place for the first time.

1885 proved to be a watershed, after which the club enjoyed prominence at or near the top of the Eights table for decades: 1887 marked New College's first headship, one of several over the following years, with the club staying at the Head of the River for several years at a time from 1896 to 1899 and 1911 to 1913. From 1886 to 1922, New College always placed third or better in Eights.

A key feature of the pre-war era was the development of an intense rivalry with Magdalen College. Magdalen, like New, finished in the top three at Eights without fail from 1886 to 1913: in each year, the clubs raced from adjacent bunglines and either threatened or achieved a bump on each other. Given their unparalleled dominance (the remaining spot in the top three was held by several different colleges over this period), it was natural that a 1900 account referred to the two colleges as ‘the two great rivals of later days’. This sporting enmity was later cemented in the Stockholm Olympics incident of 1912.

=== The 1912 Stockholm Olympics ===
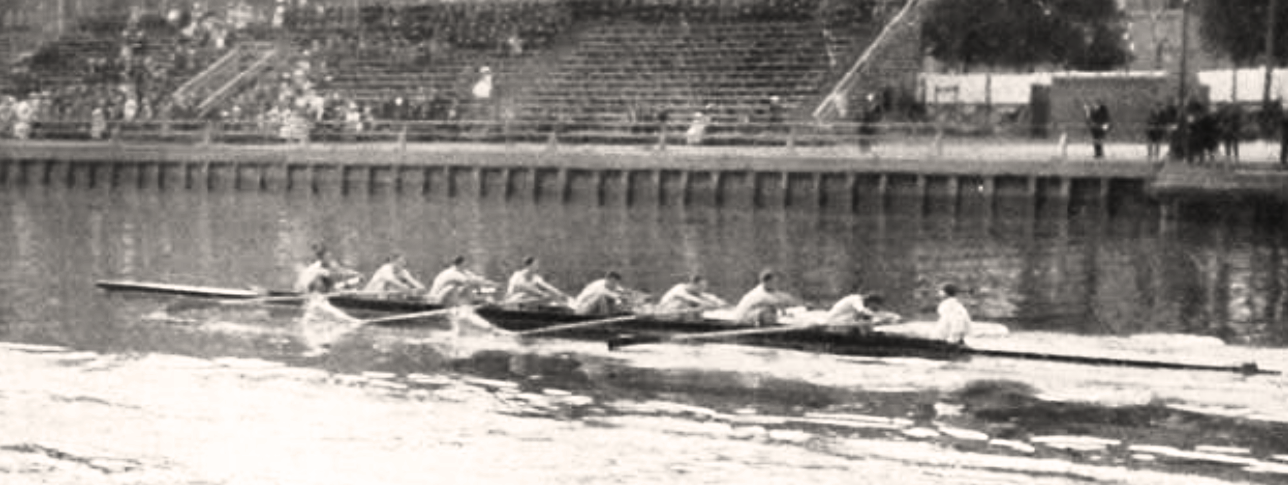
New College Boat Club, representing Great Britain, winning the Silver medal at the 1912 Stockholm Olympics

The New College Boat Club represented Great Britain at the 1912 Summer Olympics in Stockholm and won the silver medal in the men's eight.

The two British crews - New College, and a Leander Club boat largely drawn from Magdalen College, Oxford - were the favourites for gold so started at opposite ends of the draw. They both worked up through the competition to make the final.

According to New College records, the final featured controversy over lane choice. The course in Stockholm was not straight, and one of the two lanes was clearly favoured, the other requiring the cox to steer around a protruding boathouse and then back under a bridge. Before the final, the two British captains met to toss for lanes. New College won the toss and following gentlemanly tradition offered the choice of lanes to their opponents, who would - in a gentlemanly fashion - refuse this offer. However the Leander/Magdalen College captain accepted this offer and chose the better lane. Leander went on to win the gold medal, leaving New College with the silver.

According to New College tradition, King Gustav V of Sweden was so disheartened by this display of ungentlemanly conduct that, as a consolation, he presented his colours to New College; ever since then, New College have raced in purple and gold, the colours of the royal house of Sweden. A further tradition has been the adoption of the toast: 'God Damn Bloody Magdalen!', the supposed words of the New College stroke Robert Bourne as they crossed the line. The abbreviation GDBM has been used commonly ever since, and is still on bottom of the NCBC letterhead.

=== Recent form ===
In the 2025 Torpids, the women's first VIII climbed four places, bumping Jesus, L.M.H., Trinity and Magdalen to finish 10th in Torpids, while the men's first VIII climbed one place and finished 9th. The men's and women's second boats are in Division 4, placing 4th and 7th respectively. The club qualified four men's and three women’s boats, making NCBC the joint largest club on the river.

In the 2025 Eights Week, the club qualified seven crews, the second most of any club on the river. The men's first VIII climbed three places to 7th and the women's first VIII climbed one place to 12th. The men's second boat finished 12th in Division 3, while the women's second boat climbed two places to finish 4th in Division 5.

In February 2025, a composite of the men's first and second Torpids crews came 1st at Hammersmith Head in the Open 8+ Development category. In March 2025, the women's first eight competed at WEHoRR, coming 2nd of 7 Oxford college crews.

In May 2026, both the men's first and second 8+ won their respective categories (Open 8+ B1 and Open 8+ B2) at Chiswick Regatta, beating Vesta BC and Putney Town BC..

In the 2026 Eights Week, history was made. A total of 10 crews were entered into Summer Eights, with 6 crews qualifying. New College was not bumped a single time over the course of the week. The men's 1st VIII climbed 3 places to reach 4th in Division 1, their highest position on the river since 1999, while the women's 1st VIII rowed over to consolidate their position of 12th in Division 1. The women's 2nd VIII bumped up 4 places to win Blades and re-enter fixed divisions for the first time since 2022, while the men's 2nd VIII bumped up 3 times. The men's 3rd VIII bumped up 6 places to win Blades, and the men's 4th VIII bumped up 2 places to become the highest men's 4th VIII on the river. These are the first blades that the club has won since their triple men's blades in 2022.

== Honours ==
=== Henley Royal Regatta ===
The club has won four events at Henley Royal Regatta in its history.

Event	Win	2nd
Grand Challenge Cup	1897	1889, 1895, 1904
Ladies' Challenge Plate	1900, 1950	1908
Stewards' Challenge Cup	1912, 1913	1894, 1897, 1898
Visitors' Challenge Cup	1894, 1898	1899, 1939, 1946, 1948

=== Boat Race representatives ===
The following rowers were part of the rowing club at the time of their participation in The Boat Race.

Men's boat race

Year	Name
1854	W. F. Short
1856	G. Bennett
1877	F. M. Beaumont (cox)
1878	F. M. Beaumont (cox)
1879	H. M. Robinson
1879	F. M. Beaumont (cox)
1882	G. C. Bourne
1883	G. C. Bourne
1883	Douglas McLean
1884	Douglas McLean
1885	Hector McLean
1885	Douglas McLean
1886	Hector McLean
1886	Douglas McLean
1887	Hector McLean
1887	Douglas McLean
1888	S. R. Fothergill
1888	A. H. Stewart (cox)
1889	F. C. Drake
1889	Oliver Russell
1889	J. P. Heywood-Lonsdale (cox)
1890	C. H. St J. Hornby
1890	Oliver Russell
1890	J. P. Heywood-Lonsdale (cox)
1891	Oliver Russell
1891	J. P. Heywood-Lonsdale (cox)
1892	C. M. Pitman
1892	J. P. Heywood-Lonsdale (cox)
1893	J. A. Morrison
1893	C. M. Pitman
1894	J. A. Morrison
1894	T. H. E. Stretch
1894	W. E. Crum
1894	C. M. Pitman
1895	C. K. Phillips
1895	T. H. E. Stretch
1895	W. E. Crum
1895	C. M. Pitman
1895	C. P. Serocold (cox)
1896	J. J. J. de Knoop
1896	C. K. Phillips
1896	W. E. Crum
1897	J. J. J. de Knoop
1897	G. O. C. Edwards
1897	C. K. Phillips

Year	Name
1897	W. E. Crum
1898	R. O. Pitman
1898	G. O. C. Edwards
1898	C. K. Phillips
1899	R. O. Pitman
1899	C. E. Johnston
1900	R. H. Culme-Seymour
1900	C. E. Johnston
1901	James Younger
1901	A. de L. Long
1901	R. H. Culme-Seymour
1902	James Younger
1902	A. de L. Long
1903	A. de L. Long
1906	G. M. A. Graham
1906	J. Dewar
1910	R. C. Bourne
1911	C. W. B. Littlejohn
1912	F. A. H. Pitman
1912	A. F. R. Wiggins
1912	C. W. B. Littlejohn
1912	R. C. Bourne
1913	R. P. Hankinson
1913	H. K. Ward
1913	A. F. R. Wiggins
1914	B. Burdekin
1914	H. K. Ward
1914	A. F. R. Wiggins
1914	F. A. H. Pitman
1928	G. E. Godber
1929	G. E. Godber
1929	G. V. Stopford (cox)
1932	G. A. Ellison
1933	P. Hogg
1933	G. A. Ellison
1934	P. Hogg
1935	R. Hope
1935	D. R. B. Mynors
1936	M. G. C. Ashby
1937	M. G. C. Ashby
1946	R. M. A. Bourne
1947	R. M. A. Bourne
1950	J. Hayes
1951	J. F. E. Smith
1951	L. A. F. Stokes

Year	Name
1951	M. J. Hawkes
1951	C. G. Turner
1952	L. A. F. Stokes
1953	R. A. Byatt
1954	J. G. McLeod
1955	J. G. McLeod
1956	J. G. McLeod
1956	R. H. Carnegie
1957	R. H. Carnegie
1962	T. W. Tennant
1963	P. A. V. Roff
1967	J. E. Jensen
1967	Daniel Topolski
1968	Daniel Topolski
1856	P. C. Pritchard
1969	A. T. Calvert (cox)
1970	A. T. Calvert (cox)
1977	A. G. Michelmore
1978	A. G. Michelmore
1981	R. P. Yonge
1982	R. P. Yonge
1982	R. C. Clay
1983	R. P. Yonge
1983	G. R. D. Jones
1984	R. C. Clay
1984	G. R. D. Jones
1985	G. J. Cartledge
1985	G. R. D. Jones
1986	G. R. D. Jones
1987	Tom A. D. Cadoux-Hudson
1988	Tom A. D. Cadoux-Hudson
1995	Garth Rosengren
1996	John F. Hammond
2011	Sam Winter-Levy (cox)
2016	Sam Collier (cox)
2017	Sam Collier (cox)
2026	Fergus Pim

Women's boat race

Year	Name
2016	Joanneke Jansen
2017	Rebecca Esselstein
2022	Erin Reelick
