= The Boat Race 1904 =

61st Boat Race
- Date: 26 March 1904
- Winner: Cambridge
- Margin of victory: 6 lengths
- Winning time: 21 minutes 37 seconds
- Overall record (Cambridge–Oxford): 27–33
- Umpire: Frederick I. Pitman (Cambridge)

The 61st Boat Race took place on 26 March 1904. Held annually, the Boat Race is a side-by-side rowing race between crews from the Universities of Oxford and Cambridge along the River Thames. Neither boat club president was able to row through injury. In a race umpired by former rower Frederick I. Pitman, Cambridge won by 4 1/2 lengths in a time of 21 minutes 37 seconds. Their third victory in a row, it took the overall record in the event to 33–27 in Oxford's favour.

== Background ==
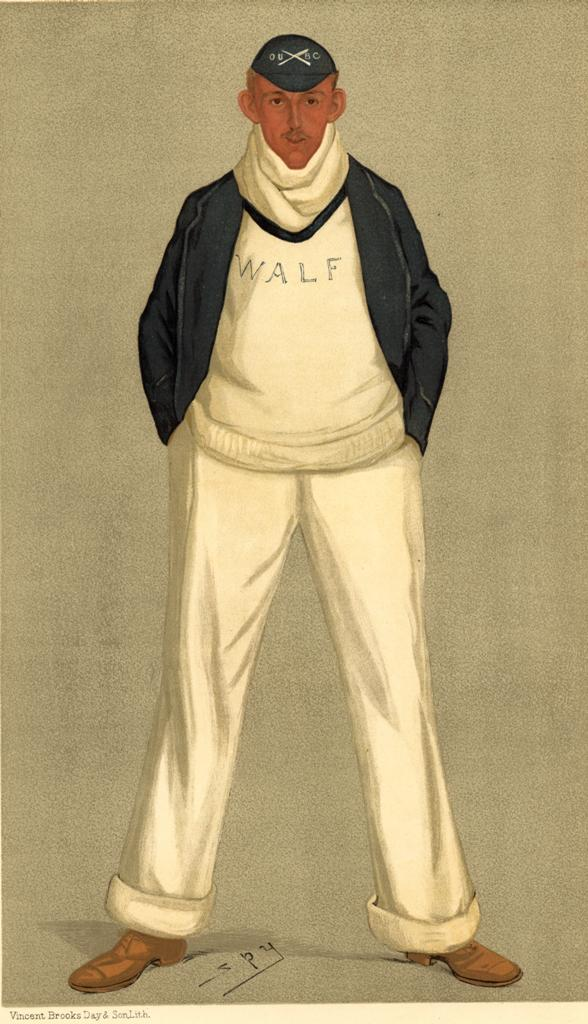
William Fletcher coached Oxford.

The Boat Race is a side-by-side rowing competition between the University of Oxford (sometimes referred to as the "Dark Blues") and the University of Cambridge (sometimes referred to as the "Light Blues"). The race was first held in 1829, and since 1845 has taken place on the 4.2-mile (6.8 km) Championship Course on the River Thames in southwest London. The rivalry is a major point of honour between the two universities; it is followed throughout the United Kingdom and, as of 2015, broadcast worldwide. Cambridge went into the race as reigning champions, having won the 1903 race by six lengths, while Oxford led overall with 33 victories to Cambridge's 26 (excluding the "dead heat" of 1877).

Oxford's coaches were G. C. Bourne who had rowed for university in the 1882 and 1883 races, William Fletcher, who rowed for them in the 1890, 1891, 1892 and 1893 races and C. K. Philips who had represented the Dark Blues four times between 1895 and 1898. Cambridge were coached by Francis Escombe and Claude Waterhouse Hearn Taylor (who rowed for Cambridge three times between 1901 and 1903). The umpire for the second year was old Etonian and former Cambridge rower Frederick I. Pitman who rowed in the 1884, 1885 and 1886 races.

Both boat club presidents, Monier-Williams and Edwards-Moss, were unable to row through injury. According to George Drinkwater, contemporary Oxford rower and subsequent author, the Dark Blues "never got together ... and invariably lost form over a long course". He also noted that "Cambridge were not up to the standard of their last two crews."

== Crews ==
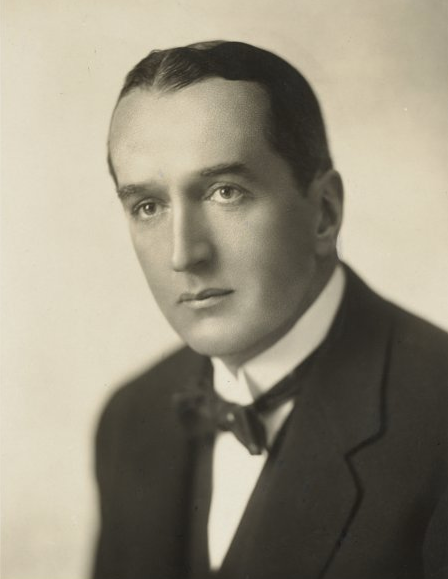
Stanley Bruce rowed at number two for Cambridge.

The Oxford crew weighed an average of 11 st 9.75 lb (74.1 kg), 1 pound (0.5 kg) per rower more than their opponents. Two of the Cambridge crew had previous Boat Race experience, the number six P. H. Thomas (who was rowing for the third consecutive year) and the cox B. G. A. Scott. Oxford's crew had a single returning rower, the stroke A. K. Graham. Two of the participants in the race were registered as non-British, in Cambridge's Australian number two Stanley Bruce and their number seven Harold Gillies who was from New Zealand.

Seat	Oxford			Cambridge		
Seat	Name	College	Weight	Name	College	Weight
Bow	T. G. Brocklebank	Trinity	10 st 9.25 lb	H. Sanger	Lady Margaret Boat Club	10 st 7 lb
2	R. W. Somers-Smith	Merton	10 st 8 lb	S. M. Bruce	Trinity Hall	12 st 0 lb
3	A. J. S. H. Hales	Corpus Christi	12 st 3.75 lb	B. C. Johnstone	3rd Trinity	12 st 1 lb
4	H. W. Jelf	Christ Church	12 st 6 lb	A. L. Lawrence	1st Trinity	12 st 13.75 lb
5	P. C. Underhill	Brasenose	12 st 9 lb	R. V. Powell	3rd Trinity	12 st 2.75 lb
6	A. R. Balfour	University	12 st 0 lb	P. H. Thomas	3rd Trinity	12 st 7 lb
7	E. P. Evans	University	13 st 0.5 lb	H. D. Gillies	Gonville and Caius	10 st 5 lb
Stroke	A. K. Graham	Balliol	11 st 0 lb	M. V. Smith	Trinity Hall	10 st 5.5 lb
Cox	E. C. T. Warner	Christ Church	7 st 10 lb	B. G. A. Scott	Trinity Hall	8 st 4 lb
Source: (P) – boat club president

== Race ==
The Championship Course along which the Boat Race is contested

Cambridge won the toss and elected to start from the Surrey station, handing the Middlesex side of the river to Oxford. Pitman started the race at 7:45 a.m. in cold and foggy conditions, and on a weak tide. Oxford took an early lead, outrating Cambridge from the start, and getting clear of them by the Mile Post. The Light Blues steadied their rhythm and started to catch Oxford, and errant steering from the Dark Blue cox E. C. T. Warner at Harrods Furniture Depository allowed Cambridge to reduce the deficit.

By Hammersmith Bridge, Oxford's lead was down to two-thirds of a length and by The Doves pub, the crews were level. The Light Blues pushed ahead and were clear by Chiswick Ferry as Oxford struggled to maintain their technique. Cambridge passed the finishing post with a lead of 4 1/2 lengths, in a winning time of 21 minutes 37 seconds, the slowest winning time since the 1898 race. It was Cambridge's third consecutive victory and their fifth in six years. Drinkwater remarked that the "race was a good one, for the crews were more evenly matched".
