= The Boat Race 1903 =

60h Boat Race
- Date: 1 April 1903
- Winner: Cambridge
- Margin of victory: 6 lengths
- Winning time: 19 minutes 33 seconds
- Overall record (Cambridge–Oxford): 26–33
- Umpire: Frederick I. Pitman (Cambridge)

The 60th Boat Race took place on 1 April 1903. Held annually, the Boat Race is a side-by-side rowing race between crews from the Universities of Oxford and Cambridge along the River Thames. The race was umpired for the first time by former Cambridge rower Frederick I. Pitman, whose misfiring starter pistol caused confusion at the start, allowing Cambridge to gain an advantage. They went on to win by six lengths in a time of 19 minutes 33 seconds. The victory took the overall record to 33–26 in Oxford's favour.

== Background ==
The Boat Race is a side-by-side rowing competition between the University of Oxford (sometimes referred to as the "Dark Blues") and the University of Cambridge (sometimes referred to as the "Light Blues"). The race was first held in 1829, and since 1845 has taken place on the 4.2-mile (6.8 km) Championship Course on the River Thames in southwest London. The rivalry is a major point of honour between the two universities; it is followed throughout the United Kingdom and as of 2014, broadcast worldwide. Cambridge went into the race as reigning champions, having won the 1902 race by five lengths, while Oxford led overall with 33 victories to Cambridge's 25 (excluding the "dead heat" of 1877).

Oxford's coaches were G. C. Bourne who had rowed for the university in the 1882 and 1883 races and C. K. Philips who had represented the Dark Blues four times between 1895 and 1898. Cambridge were coached by Charles John Bristowe who had represented the Light Blues in the 1886 and 1887 races and Claude Goldie who had rowed in the 1898 and 1899 races. The Light Blues were later coached by William Dudley Ward. The umpire for the first time was old Etonian and former Cambridge rower Frederick I. Pitman who rowed in the 1884, 1885 and 1886 races.

During the build-up to the race, Oxford suffered a series of misfortunes, including a bout of influenza which caused several changes in their crew. Centred on the group of Blues returning from the previous year, Cambridge were able to produce "a very fast crew".

== Crews ==
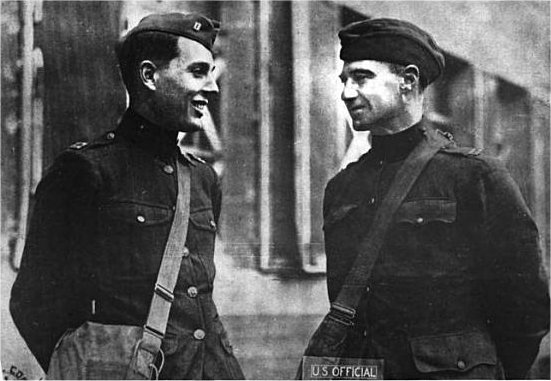
Devereux Milburn (left, in 1917), the only non-British rower in the 1903 race, rowed at number 5 for Oxford.

The Cambridge crew weighed an average of 12 st 3.5 lb (77.6 kg), 4 pounds (1.8 kg) more per rower than their opponents. Oxford's crew contained four rowers with Boat Race experience, including A. de L. Long who was rowing in his third consecutive event. Cambridge saw six rowers return from the 1902 crew, including W. H. Chapman, H. B. Grylls, C. W. H. Taylor and R. H. Nelson, all of whom were taking part in their third Boat Race. Only Oxford's Devereux Milburn was registered as a non-British rower. An American, he attended The Hill School in Pennsylvania before graduating from Harvard University.

Seat	Oxford			Cambridge		
Seat	Name	College	Weight	Name	College	Weight
Bow	C. A. Willis	Magdalen	11 st 4 lb	W. H. Chapman	3rd Trinity	11 st 3 lb
2	A. K. Graham	Balliol	10 st 12 lb	P. H. Thomas	3rd Trinity	12 st 8.5 lb
3	A. de L. Long	New College	12 st 11 lb	S. R. Beale	1st Trinity	11 st 2 lb
4	F. S. Kelly	Balliol	11 st 12 lb	C. W. H. Taylor	3rd Trinity	12 st 11 lb
5	D. Milburn	Lincoln	12 st 1 lb	J. S. Carter	King's	13 st 4 lb
6	G. C. Drinkwater	Wadham	12 st 10 lb	H. B. Grylls	1st Trinity	12 st 13 lb
7	E. G. Monier-Williams	University	11 st 11 lb	J. Edwards-Moss	3rd Trinity	12 st 9 lb
Stroke	F. O. J. Huntley	University	12 st 5 lb	R. H. Nelson	3rd Trinity	11 st 5 lb
Cox	F. T. H. Eyre	Keble	6 st 6 lb	B. G. A. Scott	Trinity Hall	8 st 6 lb
Source: (P) – boat club president

== Race ==
The Championship Course along which the Boat Race is contested

Oxford won the toss and elected to start from the Surrey station, handing the Middlesex side of the river to Cambridge. On a strong tide, umpire Pitman attempted to start the race at 3:35 p.m. After he shouted "Are you ready?", Cambridge squared their blades and were dragged away from their stakeboat, and rowed on despite Pitman failing to correctly discharge the starter pistol. Worse, he failed to notice the departing Light Blues who were already one third of a length ahead before Oxford got on their way. Somewhat dismayed by the disadvantageous start, author and the number seven for this year's race George Drinkwater stated they "rowed like a beaten crew from the first stroke."

With a lead of nearly three lengths by Hammersmith Bridge, Cambridge pushed on to hold a four-and-a-half length lead at Barnes Bridge, and passed the finishing post six lengths ahead, in a time of 19 minutes 33 seconds. It was their second consecutive win and their fourth in five years, and took the overall record in the event to 33–26 in Oxford's favour.
