= The Boat Race 1929 =

81st Boat Race
- Date: 23 March 1929
- Winner: Cambridge
- Margin of victory: 7 lengths
- Winning time: 19 minutes 24 seconds
- Overall record (Cambridge–Oxford): 40–40
- Umpire: Charles Burnell (Oxford)

Other races
- Women's winner: Cambridge

The 81st Boat Race took place on 23 March 1929. Held annually, the Boat Race is a side-by-side rowing race between crews from the Universities of Oxford and Cambridge along the River Thames. The event featured three Olympic medallists and included the first Danish rower ever to participate in the Boat Race. In a race umpired by former Oxford rower Charles Burnell, Cambridge won by seven lengths in a time of 19 minutes 24 seconds, the fastest winning time since the 1924 race. The victory, their sixth in a row and their tenth in the previous eleven years, levelled the overall record for the first time since 1863, at 40 wins each. As of February 2026, the race records have never since been even overall, with Cambridge taking the lead in 1930 and maintaining it to the present.

== Background ==
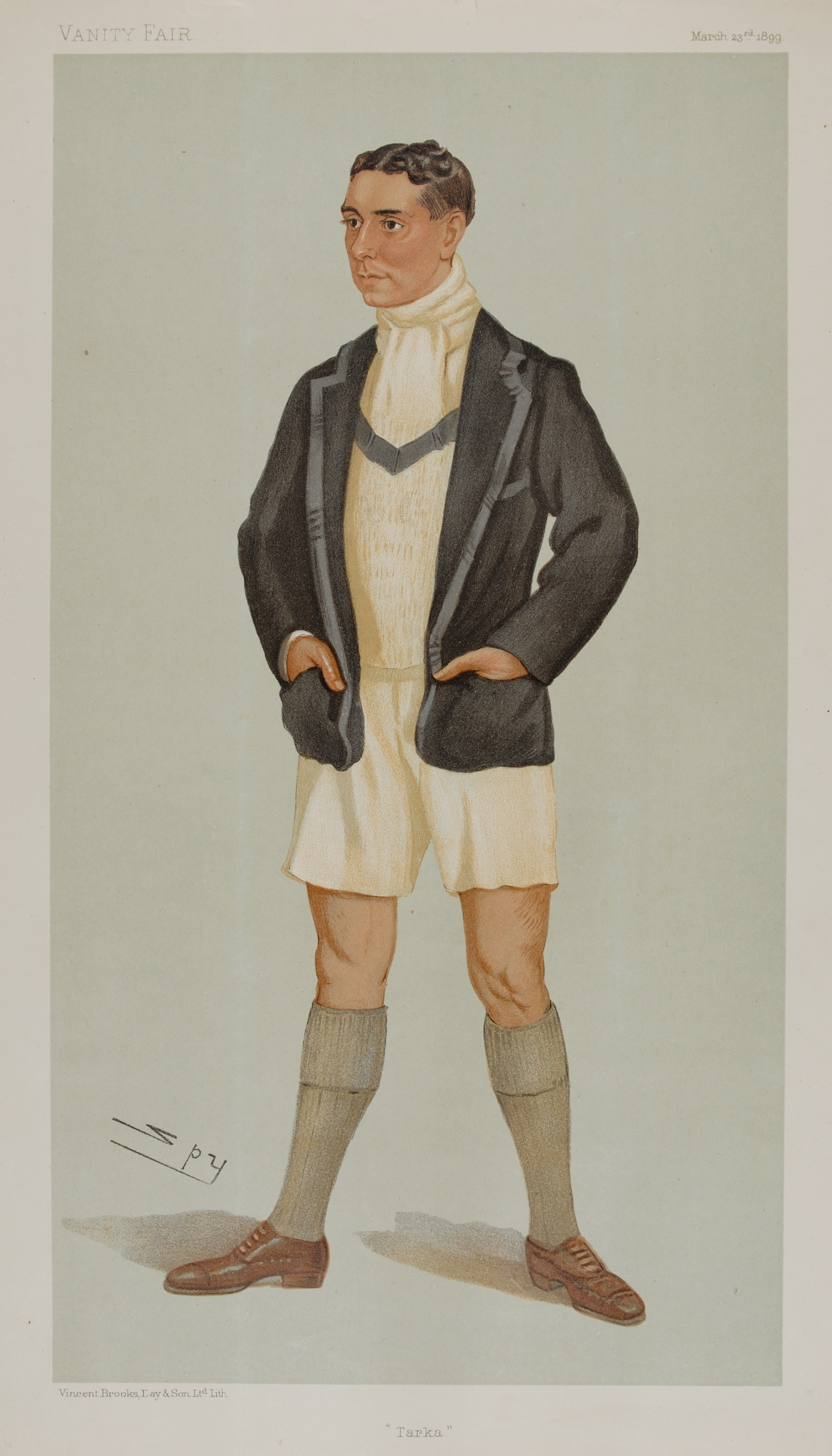
Harcourt Gilbey Gold coached the Oxford crew.

The Boat Race is a side-by-side rowing competition between the University of Oxford (sometimes referred to as the "Dark Blues") and the University of Cambridge (sometimes referred to as the "Light Blues"). The race was first held in 1829, and since 1845 has taken place on the 4.2-mile (6.8 km) Championship Course on the River Thames in southwest London. The rivalry is a major point of honour between the two universities; it is followed throughout the United Kingdom and, as of 2014, broadcast worldwide. Cambridge went into the race as reigning champions, having won the 1928 race by ten lengths, with Oxford leading overall with 40 victories to Cambridge's 39 (excluding the "dead heat" of 1877).

Cambridge were coached by Francis Escombe and P. Haig-Thomas (four-time Blue who had rowed between 1902 and 1905). Oxford's coaches were Harcourt Gilbey Gold (Dark Blue president for the 1900 race and four-time Blue), Guy Oliver Nickalls (who had rowed three times between 1921 and 1923) and Arthur Wiggins (who had rowed for Oxford in the 1912, 1913 and 1914 races). For the third year the umpire was Charles Burnell who had rowed for Oxford in the 1895, 1896, 1897 and 1898 races. Charles Kent, who rowed for Oxford in the 1891 race, was the finishing judge for the second consecutive year.

Bad weather plagued the practice and build-up to the race: Heavy fog caused the postponement of at least one outing. The Times rowing correspondent described Cambridge's style as "so easy as to be almost sluggish" while Oxford were "lively to the point of punishing their boat".

== Crews ==
The Cambridge crew weighed an average of 12 st 10 lb (80.5 kg), 5.5 pounds (2.5 kg) per rower more than their opponents. Oxford saw two rowers return in George Godber and H. C. Morphett. Cambridge's boat contained five participants with Boat Race experience, including Richard Beesly who was making his third consecutive appearance. He and Michael Warriner were gold medallists in the coxless four at the 1928 Summer Olympics. Their cox, Arthur Sulley, won a silver medal in the men's eight. Three of the Oxford crew were registered as non-British: H. C. Morphett and J. A. Ingles were from Australia, while C. F. Juel-Brockdorff was the first Danish rower in the history of the event.

Seat	Oxford			Cambridge		
Seat	Name	College	Weight	Name	College	Weight
Bow	P. D. Barr	Trinity	11 st 5 lb	E. N. Norman-Butler	3rd Trinity	12 st 0 lb
2	G. E. Godber	New College	12 st 4.5 lb	R. J. Elles	Trinity Hall	12 st 4.5 lb
3	C. F. Juel-Brockdorff	Pembroke	12 st 12 lb	R. A. Davies-Cooke	3rd Trinity	12 st 1.5 lb
4	J. M. Macdonald	Magdalen	12 st 12.5 lb	R. Beesly (P)	1st Trinity	13 st 6 lb
5	H. C. Morphett (P)	Brasenose	12 st 4 lb	M. H. Warriner	1st Trinity	13 st 6 lb
6	J. A. Ingles	Magdalen	13 st 10 lb	J. B. Collins	3rd Trinity	14 st 6 lb
7	D. E. Tinne	University	12 st 0 lb	C. E. Wool-Lewis	3rd Trinity	12 st 2.5 lb
Stroke	A. Graham	Brasenose	11 st 2.5 lb	T. A. Brocklebank	3rd Trinity	11 st 12 lb
Cox	G. V. Stopford	New College	8 st 10 lb	A. L. Sulley	Selwyn	8 st 10 lb
Source: (P) – boat club president

== Race ==
The Championship Course along which the Boat Race is contested

Cambridge won the toss and elected to start from the Surrey station, handing the Middlesex side of the river to Oxford. The umpire Burnell started the race at 12:12 p.m. in "gloriously fine weather", and both boats got off to quick starts, with Oxford just ahead after the first strokes. Level past the boathouses, Cambridge edged ahead to hold a canvas-length lead by Craven Steps. Taking advantage of the Dark Blues' struggle in rough water by Craven Cottage, Cambridge slowly drew ahead and held a three-quarter length lead by the time the crews passed the Mile Post. A push from the Dark Blues saw them keep in contention until Hammersmith Bridge where, according to L. Cecil Smith writing in The Observer, they "went ahead so fast and steadily as to suggest that even had they lost the toss they would have been able safely to take the Surrey water" while Oxford "had been taken out of their stride". The Light Blues passed below the bridge with a two-length lead.

A spurt from Cambridge around the Chiswick Reach bend effectively ended the race as a contest. A final surge from Oxford was held off by Cambridge who passed below Barnes Bridge five lengths ahead. Here, some of the Dark Blues started to show signs of distress, in particular their bow P. D. Barr who, it was later noted, had been suffering from influenza. Later reports suggested that Barr may have been suffering from a transient cardiac dysfunction. Cambridge pulled away from the Dark Blues with every stroke and rated 36 strokes per minute towards the finish, passing the finishing post with a lead of seven lengths in a time of 19 minutes 24 seconds. It was their sixth consecutive victory, the tenth in the previous eleven years and was the fastest winning time since the 1924 race, and the ninth fastest time in the history of the event. The win took the overall record to 40–40, the first time since the 1863 race that the scores had been levelled.

According to E. P. Evans, former Oxford rower in the 1904, 1905 and 1906 races, writing in The Manchester Guardian, the Cambridge crew was "worthy to be classed with some of the best that Cambridge has turned out", while Oxford "rowed distinctly below their practice form and were a most disappointing crew". The rowing correspondent for The Times described it as a "crushing defeat" for Oxford, stating that they were "completely outpaced" yet while Cambridge "upheld the tradition of skill", Oxford "upheld that of courage".
