= The Boat Race 1897 =

54th Boat Race
- Date: 3 April 1897
- Winner: Oxford
- Margin of victory: 2 1/2 lengths
- Winning time: 19 minutes 12 seconds
- Overall record (Cambridge–Oxford): 22–31
- Umpire: Frank Willan (Oxford)

The 54th Boat Race took place on 3 April 1897. The Boat Race is an annual side-by-side rowing race between crews from the Universities of Oxford and Cambridge along the River Thames. Oxford went into the race as reigning champions, having won the previous year's race. The crews were almost evenly matched weight-wise, Oxford marginally the heavier, whose crew consisted almost entirely of veterans of the event. In a race umpired by former rower Frank Willan, Oxford won by 2 1/2 lengths in a time of 19 minutes 12 seconds, the victory taking the overall record to 31–22 in their favour. It was Oxford's eighth consecutive victory and the third fastest winning time in the history of the event.

== Background ==
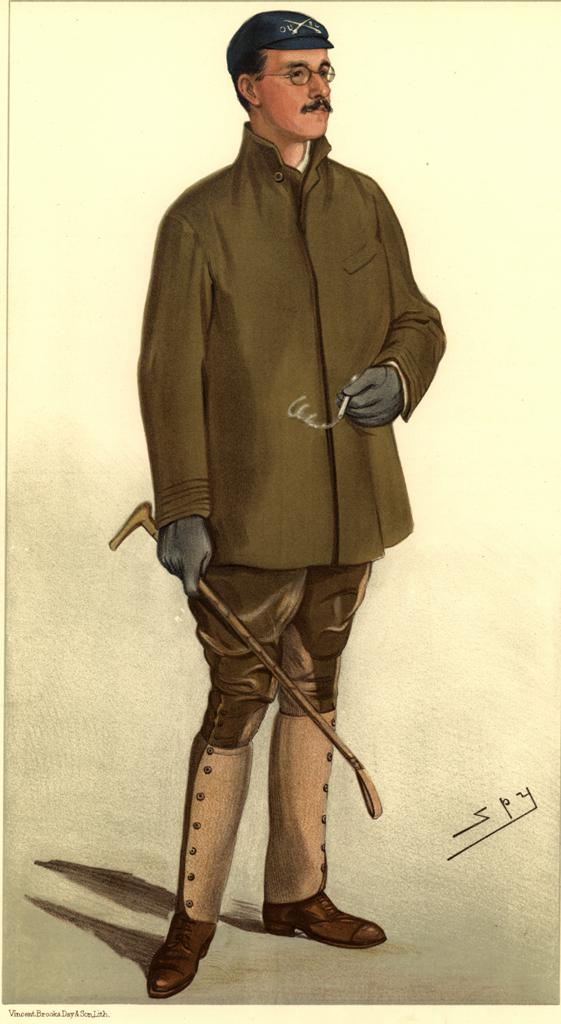
Douglas McLean coached the Oxford crew.

The Boat Race is a side-by-side rowing competition between the boat clubs of University of Oxford (sometimes referred to as the "Dark Blues") and the University of Cambridge (sometimes referred to as the "Light Blues"). The race was first held in 1829, and since 1845 has taken place on the 4.2-mile (6.8 km) Championship Course on the River Thames in southwest London. The rivalry is a major point of honour between the two universities, as of 2014 it is followed throughout the United Kingdom and broadcast worldwide. Oxford went into the race as reigning champions, having beaten Cambridge by two-fifths of a length in the previous year's race, and held the overall lead, with 30 victories to Cambridge's 22 (excluding the "dead heat" of 1877).

Oxford were coached by G. C. Bourne who had rowed for Oxford in the 1882 and 1883 races, William Fletcher, who rowed for Oxford in the 1890, 1891, 1892 and 1893 races and Douglas McLean (an Oxford Blue five times between 1883 and 1887). There is no record of who coached the Cambridge crew. Oxford were very quick, and set a full course record (on the ebb tide) of 18 minutes and 27 seconds two weeks before the race. Conversely, according to author and former rower George Drinkwater, Cambridge "never fulfilled its early promise ... always slow into the water." The umpire for the race for the ninth year in a row was Frank Willan who won the event four consecutive times, rowing for Oxford in the 1866, 1867, 1868 and 1869 races.

== Crews ==
The Oxford crew weighed an average of 12 st 6.25 lb (78.8 kg), 0.875 pounds (0.4 kg) per rower more than their opponents. The Cambridge boat included four former Blues in their number five William Augustus Bieber who was participating in his third Boat Race. Five of the Light Blues were studying at Trinity Hall. Their number four, American rower Benjamin Hunting Howell, was the only participant in the race registered as non-British, hailing from the New York. All but one of Oxford's crew had rowed in the event prior to 1897, only G. O. C. Edwards was new to the race. Eight of the nine members of the Dark Blue crew were educated at Eton College; four of their crew were studying at New College. George Drinkwater, former Oxford rower and author stated "this year saw the finest Oxford crew that has ever rowed".

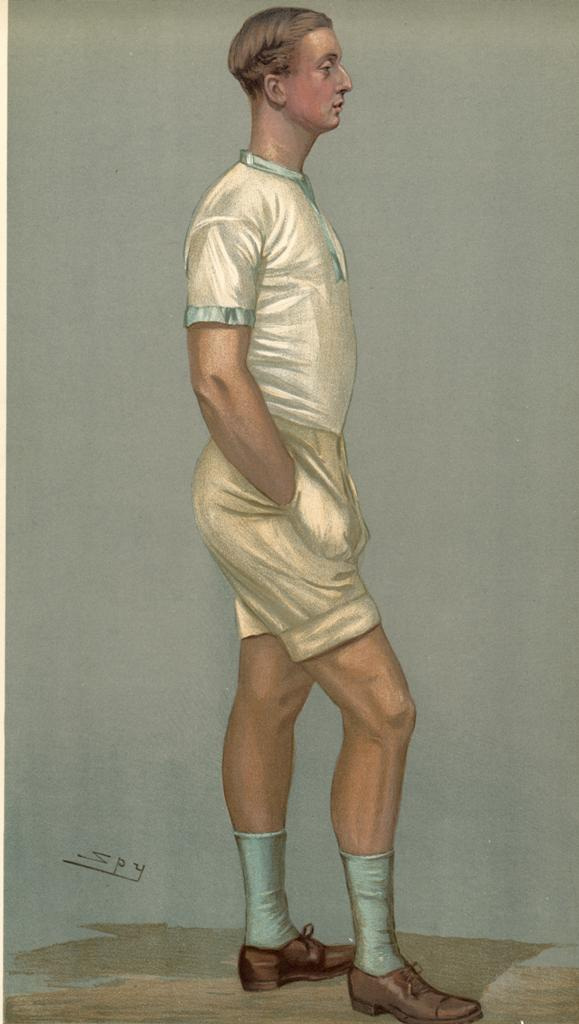
William Dudley Ward rowed at number seven for Cambridge.

| Seat | Oxford | | | Cambridge | | |
| Seat | Name | College | Weight | Name | College | Weight |
|---|---|---|---|---|---|---|
| Bow | J. J. J. de Knoop | New College | 11 st 6 lb | D. E. Campbell-Muir | Trinity Hall | 11 st 5 lb |
| 2 | G. O. C. Edwards | New College | 12 st 1 lb | A. S. Bell (P) | Trinity Hall | 12 st 1 lb |
| 3 | C. K. Phillips | New College | 12 st 0.5 lb | E. J. D. Taylor | Gonville and Caius | 12 st 13 lb |
| 4 | C. D. Burnell | Magdalen | 13 st 9 lb | B. H. Howell | Trinity Hall | 12 st 9 lb |
| 5 | E. R. Balfour | University | 13 st 8.5 lb | W. A. Bieber | Trinity Hall | 13 st 1 lb |
| 6 | R. Carr | Magdalen | 12 st 11.5 lb | D. Pennington | Gonville and Caius | 12 st 9 lb |
| 7 | W. E. Crum (P) | New College | 12 st 3 lb | W. Dudley Ward | 3rd Trinity | 12 st 6 lb |
| Stroke | H. G. Gold | Magdalen | 11 st 11 lb | W. J. Fernie | Trinity Hall | 11 st 13 lb |
| Cox | H. R. K. Pechell | Brasenose | 8 st 0.5 lb | E. C. Hawkins | Gonville and Caius | 8 st 1 lb |
Source: (P) – boat club president

== Race ==
The Championship Course, along which the race is conducted

As a result of their impressive performances during the buildup to the race, Oxford were clear favourites to win. Cambridge won the toss and elected to start from the Middlesex station, handing the Surrey side of the river to Oxford. The race was started at 2:24 p.m. in a light breeze from the east on a favourable tide. The Light Blues made the quicker start, with stroke William James Fernie taking his crew off at 41 strokes per minute. Within a quarter of a mile, Cambridge held a half-length lead but the Dark Blues began to draw back into contention and took the lead just before Craven Cottage.

A spurt at the Mile Post from the Light Blues kept them in touch but Oxford rowed away from them, taking a clear water advantage by Hammersmith Bridge, effectively ending the contest. Oxford extended their lead "as they liked" and passed the finishing post two and a half lengths clear of Cambridge, in a winning time of 19 minutes 12 seconds. It was Oxford's eighth consecutive victory and was, at the time, the third fastest winning time in the history of the event. It took the overall record to 31–22 in Oxford's favour.
