= Hector McLean =

British rower

Hector McLean (1864 – January 1888) was an Australian-born rower who rowed in the Boat Race and won Silver Goblets at Henley Royal Regatta.

McLean was the son of John Donald McLean, colonial treasurer of Queensland, Australia. He went to England where was educated at New College, Oxford and rowed in the Oxford crew in the Boat Race three times in the 1885, 1886 and 1887 races, winning in 1885. Also in 1885, he won Silver Goblets at Henley with his brother, Douglas McLean. In 1886 the McLean brothers were beaten in the final of the Silver Goblets by Stanley Muttlebury and Fraser Churchill. During the 1887 boat race his brother's oar broke. Oxford were behind at Barnes Railway Bridge, then Cambridge moved into rougher water too far over to the Surrey bank and Oxford were expecting to push through when the disaster struck. At Henley the McLeans were again runners up in Silver Goblets to Muttlebury and Charles Theodore Barclay.

McLean was Oxford president for 1887/8 when he died of typhoid fever in 1888 in the Guildford district at the age of 23.
