= William Sully Unwin =

English clergyman and rower

William Sully Unwin (born 1862) was an English clergyman and amateur rower. He won the Diamond Challenge Sculls at Henley Royal Regatta and the Wingfield Sculls in 1884 and 1885, and rowed for Oxford in the Boat Race in the 1885 and 1886 races.

Unwin was born at Rotherham, Yorkshire, the son of William Unwin and his wife Elizabeth. His father was a tutor at Oxford living at Park Town in 1881. He was of the non-collegiate St Catherine's Society, Oxford and rowed for Magdalen College, Oxford. In 1884 he won the OUBC Sculls, the Diamond Challenge Sculls at Henley and the Wingfield Sculls. He won the same three races in 1885, and was also bow in the winning Oxford boat in the Boat Race. In 1886, he was in the Boat Race again but lost the Wingfield Sculls to F I Pitman, whom he had beaten in the previous year.

Unwin became a clergyman and in 1895 was in Kewick where he attempted to establish a rowing club. Later he had a living in Norfolk. In 1933, he was active in establishing the Council for the Preservation of Rural England in Norfolk.

Unwin married Mary Frances Sully at Bridgwater in 1905.

== See also ==
- List of Oxford University Boat Race crews
