= The Boat Race 1896 =

53rd Boat Race
- Date: 28 March 1896
- Winner: Oxford
- Margin of victory: 2/5 of a length
- Winning time: 20 minutes 1 second
- Overall record (Cambridge–Oxford): 22–30
- Umpire: Frank Willan (Oxford)

The 53rd Boat Race took place on 28 March 1896. The Boat Race is an annual side-by-side rowing race between crews from the Universities of Oxford and Cambridge along the River Thames. In a race umpired by former rower Frank Willan, Oxford won by two-fifths of a length in a time of 20 minutes 1 second, taking the overall record in the event to 30–22 in their favour. It was their seventh consecutive victory and the narrowest winning margin since 1877.

== Background ==
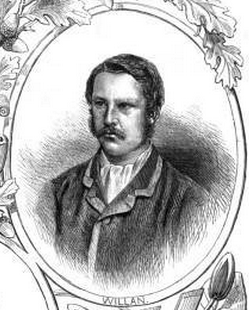
Frank Willan was umpire of the Boat Race for the eighth time.

The Boat Race is a side-by-side rowing competition between the boat clubs of University of Oxford (sometimes referred to as the "Dark Blues") and the University of Cambridge (sometimes referred to as the "Light Blues"). The race was first held in 1829, and since 1845 has taken place on the 4.2-mile (6.8 km) Championship Course on the River Thames in southwest London. The rivalry is a major point of honour between the two universities, as of 2014 it is followed throughout the United Kingdom and broadcast worldwide. Oxford went into the race as reigning champions, having beaten Cambridge by 2 1/4 lengths in the previous year's race, and held the overall lead, with 29 victories to Cambridge's 22 (excluding the "dead heat" of 1877).

Oxford's coaches were G. C. Bourne who had rowed for Oxford in the 1882 and 1883 races, R. C. Lehmann, the former president of the Cambridge Union Society and captain of the 1st Trinity Boat Club (although he had rowed in the trials eights for Cambridge, he was never selected for the Blue boat) and Douglas McLean (an Oxford Blue five times between 1883 and 1887). Cambridge were coached by Stanley Muttlebury who had rowed for Cambridge five times between the 1886 and 1890 races. The umpire for the race for the eighth year in a row was Frank Willan who won the event four consecutive times, rowing for Oxford in the 1866, 1867, 1868 and 1869 races.

== Crews ==
The Oxford crew weighed an average of 12 st 6.5 lb (79.0 kg), 1 pound (0.5 kg) per rower more than their opponents. Five of the Cambridge crew had rowed in the previous year's race: boat club president Theodore Byram Hope, Herbert Aylward Game, Richard Yerburgh Bonsey, Thomas Jones Gibb Duncanson and Adam Searle Bell. The Oxford crew contained three former Blues, including Walter Erskine Crum who was making his third consecutive appearance in the event. Six of the Oxford crew and two Cantabrigians were educated at Eton College.

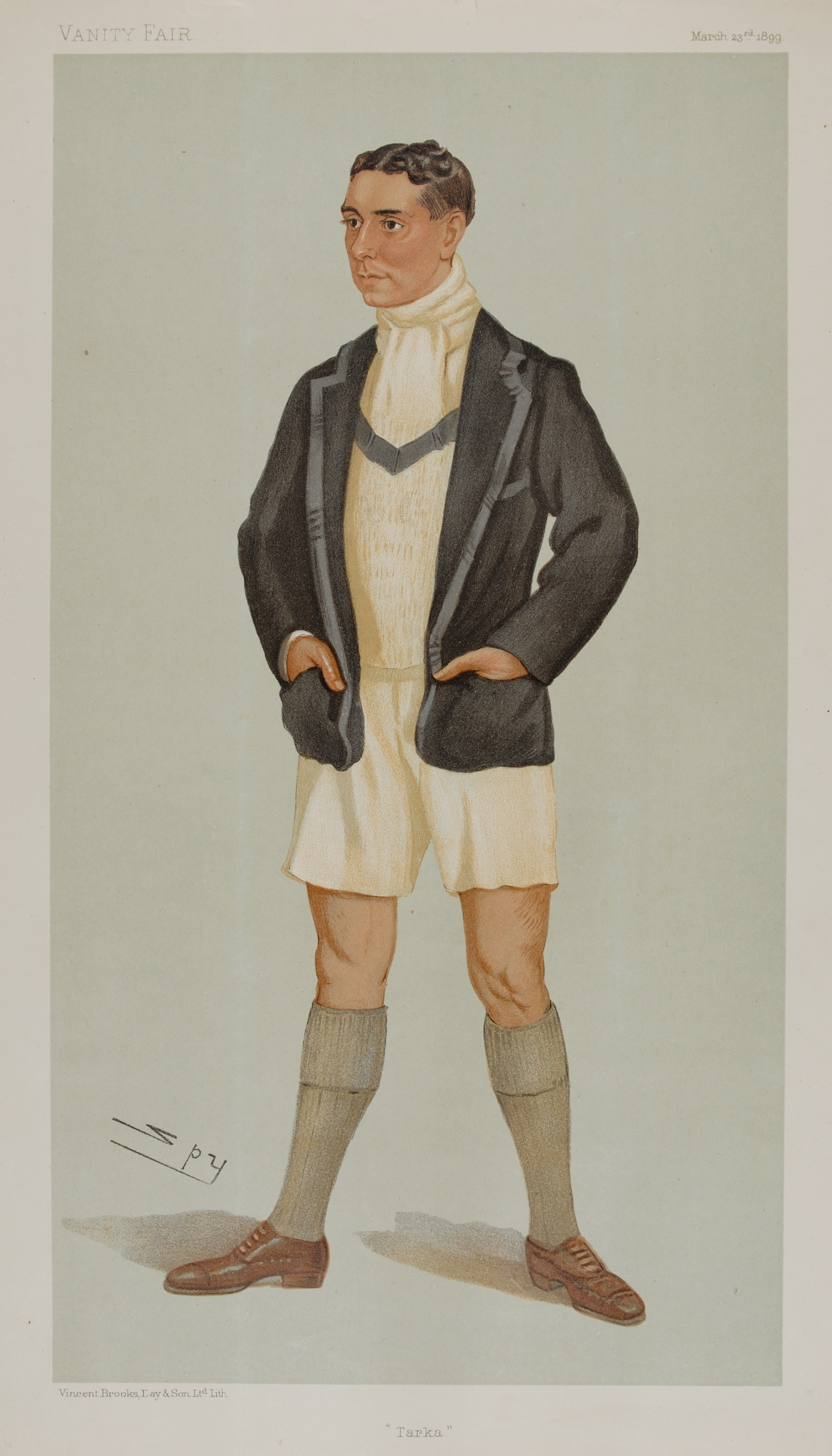
Harcourt Gilbey Gold (caricatured in 1899) rowed for Oxford.

Seat	Oxford			Cambridge		
Seat	Name	College	Weight	Name	College	Weight
Bow	J. J. J. de Knoop	New College	11 st 1.5 lb	T. B. Hope (P)	Trinity Hall	11 st 1 lb
2	C. K. Phillips	New College	12 st 5.5 lb	H. A. Game	1st Trinity	12 st 4 lb
3	E. C. Sherwood	Magdalen	12 st 12 lb	D. Pennington	Gonville and Caius	12 st 7 lb
4	C. D. Burnell	Magdalen	13 st 10 lb	R. Y. Bonsey	Lady Margaret Boat Club	12 st 10 lb
5	E. R. Balfour	University	13 st 6 lb	W. A. Bieber	Trinity Hall	12 st 12 lb
6	R. Carr	Magdalen	12 st 8.5 lb	T. J. G. Duncanson	Emmanuel	13 st 12 lb
7	W. E. Crum	New College	12 st 3 lb	A. S. Bell	Trinity Hall	11 st 13 lb
Stroke	H. G. Gold	Magdalen	11 st 5.5 lb	W. J. Fernie	Trinity Hall	11 st 13 lb
Cox	H. R. K. Pechell	Brasenose	8 st 1 lb	T. R. Paget-Tomlinson	Trinity Hall	8 st 4.5 lb
Source: (P) – boat club president M. C. Pilkington acted as non-rowing president for Oxford.

== Race ==
The Championship Course, along which the race is conducted

Cambridge, the pre-race favourites, won the toss and elected to start from the Surrey station, handing the Middlesex side of the river to Oxford. Starting at 1:03 p.m., the race was conducted in strong westerly winds and rain showers. Cambridge started the faster of the crews and outrated Oxford by two strokes per minute, and by Craven Steps (approximately 1,000 yards (910 m)) along the course) they held a one-third length lead. With the bend in the river in their favour, Oxford drew level by the Mile Post, but by Harrods Furniture Depository Cambridge were ahead, holding a three-quarter length advantage by Hammersmith Bridge. Into the rough water past the bridge, Oxford struggled and the Light Blues were clear at The Doves pub. By Chiswick Steps they had extended the lead to one and a half lengths.

Despite being behind for most of the race, the Oxford stroke Harcourt Gilbey Gold maintained his crew's pace and rhythm and along Corney Reach (around 3 miles (4.8 km) into the race) they were overlapping the Light Blue boat. Encountering a challenging combination of wind and tide, Cambridge began to struggle by the brewery at Mortlake, and the Dark Blues took advantage, overtaking Cambridge and passed the finishing post two-fifths of a length ahead in a time of 20 minutes 1 second. It was their seventh consecutive victory and the narrowest margin of victory since the 1877 race. Author and former Oxford rower George Drinkwater described the race as "one of the most stubbornly contested that has ever been rowed".
