= The Boat Race 1886 =

43rd Boat Race
- Date: 3 April 1886
- Winner: Cambridge
- Margin of victory: 2/3 of a length
- Winning time: 22 minutes 30 seconds
- Overall record (Cambridge–Oxford): 19–23
- Umpire: Robert Lewis-Lloyd

The 43rd Boat Race took place on 3 April 1886. The Boat Race is an annual side-by-side rowing race between crews from the Universities of Oxford and Cambridge along the River Thames. Repairs to Hammersmith Bridge restricted the crews to pass through a single arch. Umpired by Robert Lewis-Lloyd, Cambridge won the race by two-thirds of a length in a time of 22 minutes 30 seconds, becoming the first crew to come from behind at Barnes Bridge to win.

== Background ==
The Championship Course, along which the race is conducted

The Boat Race is a side-by-side rowing competition between the University of Oxford (sometimes referred to as the "Dark Blues") and the University of Cambridge (sometimes referred to as the "Light Blues"). First held in 1829, the race takes place on the 4.2 miles (6.8 km) Championship Course on the River Thames in southwest London. The rivalry is a major point of honour between the two universities; it is followed throughout the United Kingdom and as of 2014, broadcast worldwide. Oxford went into the race as reigning champions, having won the previous year's race by 2 1/2 lengths and held the overall lead, with 23 victories to Cambridge's 18 (excluding the "dead heat" of 1877).

Oxford's coach was F. P. Bully. Cambridge were coached by Thomas Edmund Hockin (who rowed for the Light Blues four times in the 1876, 1877, 1878 and 1879 races), Charles William Moore (who represented Cambridge in the 1881, 1882, 1883 and 1884 races), and Herbert Edward Rhodes (who rowed in the 1873, 1874, 1875 and 1876 races).

The umpire for the race was Robert Lewis-Lloyd (who had rowed for Cambridge four times between 1856 and 1859). Hammersmith Bridge was undergoing repair and during practice, the crews struggled to negotiate side-by-side rowing through the same arch without fouling. It was agreed that should such a foul occur during the race, a restart above the bridge would take place, with a new finishing line near Kew. Two sets of oars were taken on the umpire's launch should such an eventuality arise and a clash result in irreparable damage.

== Crews ==
The Oxford crew weighed an average of 12 st 3.75 lb (77.7 kg), 4 pounds (1.8 kg) more than their opponents. Cambridge's crew contained three former Blues, including their boat club president Frederick Islay Pitman and Steve Fairbairn, both of whom were rowing in their third Boat Race. Oxford saw six rowers return to the crew, including the boat club president Douglas McLean who was making his fourth appearance in the event, and rowing with his brother Hector for the second consecutive year. There were two non-British registered participants in the race: Australians Fairbairn (for Cambridge) and W. St L. Robertson (for Oxford).

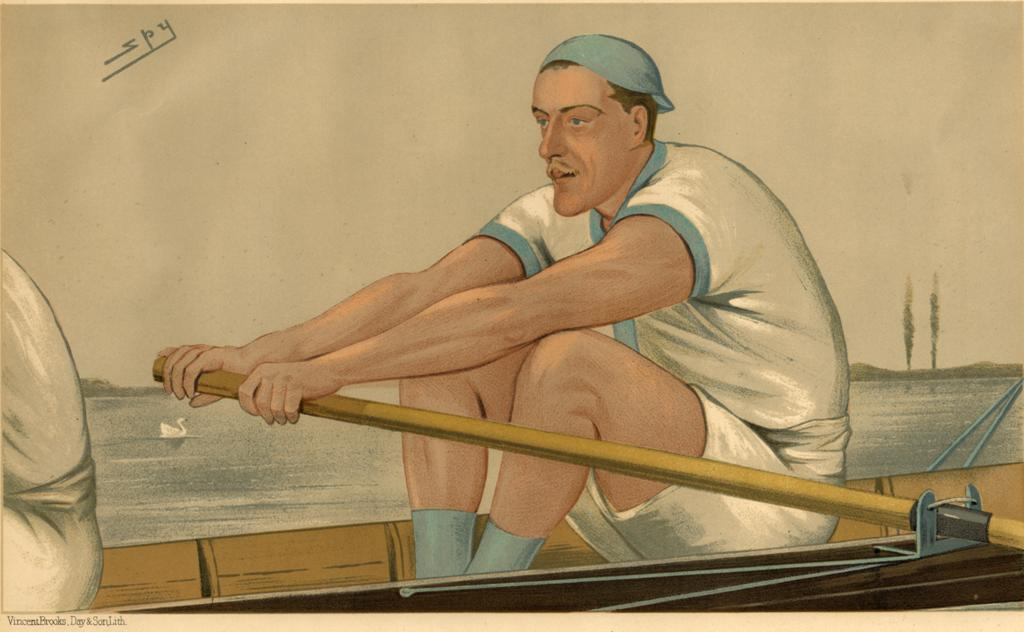
A caricature published in Vanity Fair of Stanley Muttlebury, who rowed for Cambridge in the number six seat.

Seat	Oxford			Cambridge		
Seat	Name	College	Weight	Name	College	Weight
Bow	W. S. Unwin	Magdalen	10 st 11 lb	C. J. Bristowe	Trinity Hall	10 st 8.5 lb
2	L. S. R. Byrne	Trinity	11 st 11.5 lb	N. P. Symonds	Lady Margaret Boat Club	10 st 10 lb
3	W. St L. Robertson	Wadham	11 st 7.5 lb	J. Walmsley	Trinity Hall	12 st 1 lb
4	C. R. Carter	Corpus Christi	13 st 0.5 lb	A. D. Flower	Clare	12 st 8.5 lb
5	H. McLean	New College	12 st 12 lb	S. Fairbairn	Jesus	13 st 9 lb
6	F. O. Wethered	Christ Church	12 st 6 lb	S. D. Muttlebury	3rd Trinity	13 st 3 lb
7	D. H. McClean (P)	New College	13 st 0 lb	C. Barclay	3rd Trinity	12 st 4 lb
Stroke	H. Girdlestone	Magdalen	12 st 9.25 lb	F. I. Pitman (P)	3rd Trinity	11 st 10.5 lb
Cox	W. E. Maynard	Exeter	7 st 12 lb	G. H. Baker	Queens'	6 st 9 lb
Source: (P) – boat club president

== Race ==
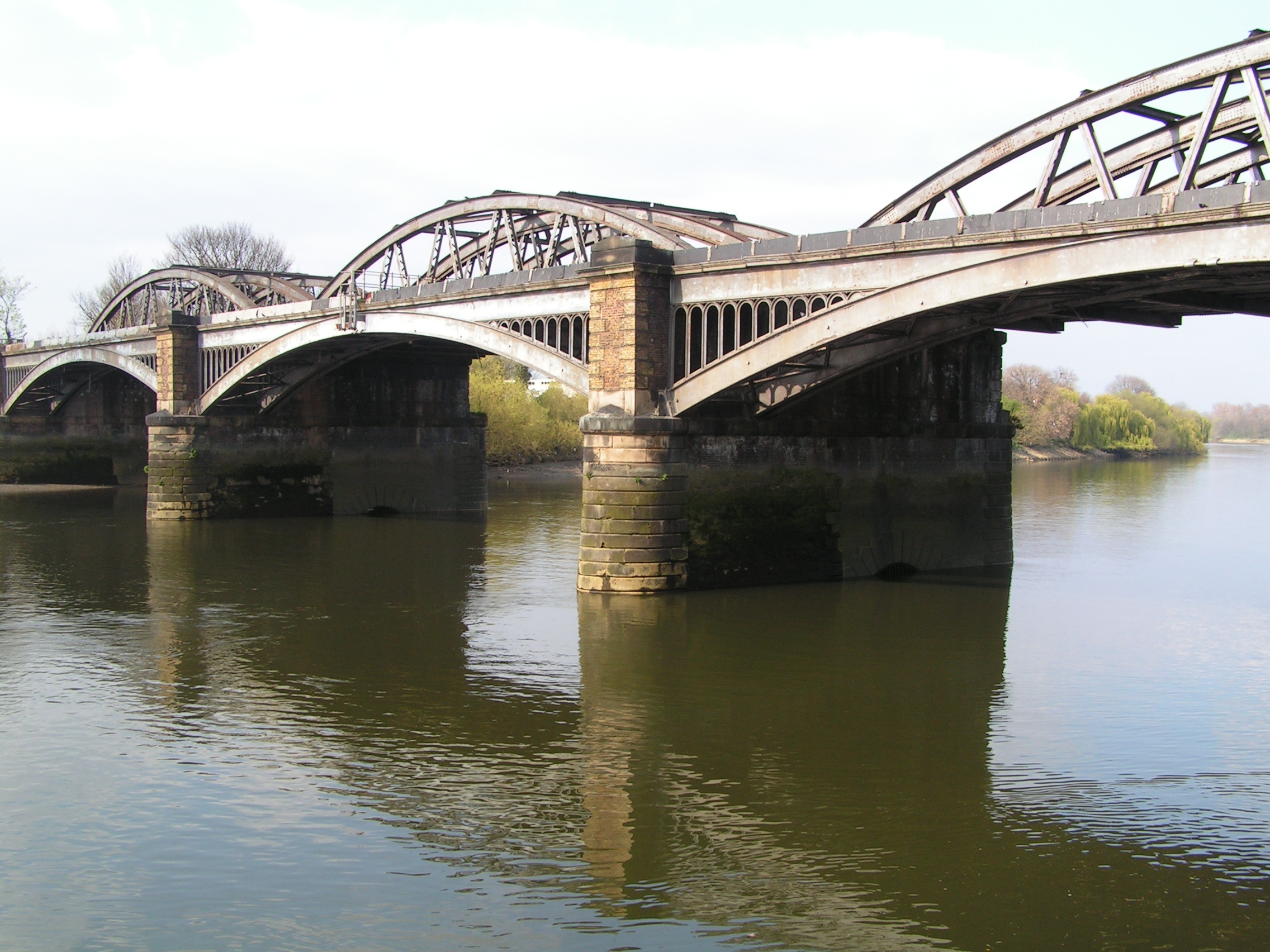
Cambridge became the first crew to come from behind at Barnes Bridge to win the Boat Race.

Oxford won the toss and elected to start from the Surrey station, handing the Middlesex station to Cambridge. Commencing at 1.38 p.m., the Light Blues made the better start and by the time the crews passed Craven Cottage, they held just less than a half-length lead. Oxford began to close the gap, and by the soap works, the boats were level. On the approach to Hammersmith Bridge, the coxes "steered with such accuracy and nerve as they had never shown in practice" and both crews were able to shoot the bridge safely, with only a "few inches to spare". Rowing into rough water, Oxford started to pull away and between Chiswick and Barnes Bridge, the lead increased to more than two lengths. At the bridge, Cambridge made a push and increased their rating to 40 strokes per minute, sustaining the drive for three minutes and overtaking Oxford, passing the finishing post by a margin of two-thirds of a length. The winning time was 22 minutes 30 seconds and the win was Cambridge's second victory in three years, taking the overall record to 23–19 in Oxford's favour.

It was the first time the winning crew had come from behind at Barnes Bridge to win. According to author and former Oxford rower George Drinkwater, "never in the whole history of the Boatrace (sic) has there been a contest more thrilling to watch or more sensational in its result."
