= Fraser Churchill =

English rower

Fraser Elmslie Churchill (29 January 1863 – 29 August 1943) was an English rower who won the Silver Goblets at Henley Royal Regatta.

Churchill was born in London, the son of Charles Churchill. His family home was in Weybridge Park, Weybridge, Surrey, in the half of the parish closer to the River Thames. He was educated from age 13 at Eton and at Trinity College, Cambridge (1882–1885). There he was selected as one of the eight oarsmen to race for Cambridge University Boat Club in the Boat Races of 1883, 1884 and 1885. In 1886, he won Silver Goblets at Henley Royal Regatta with Stanley Muttlebury.

Churchill was admitted at Inner Temple (1885–1894) until his name was withdrawn. He emigrated to Australia and lived at Molong, New South Wales.

Churchill died at Molong at the age of 80.

== See also ==
- List of Cambridge University Boat Race crews
