= The Boat Race 1893 =

50th Boat Race
- Date: 22 March 1893
- Winner: Oxford
- Margin of victory: 1 1/4 lengths
- Winning time: 18 minutes 45 seconds
- Overall record (Cambridge–Oxford): 22–27
- Umpire: Frank Willan (Oxford)

The 50th Boat Race took place on 22 March 1893. The Boat Race is an annual side-by-side rowing race between crews from the Universities of Oxford and Cambridge along the River Thames. Oxford went into the event as reigning champions, having won the previous year's race. In a race umpired by former rower Frank Willan, Oxford won by a length and a quarter in a time of 18 minutes 45 seconds which was, at the time, the fastest in the history of the event. It was their fourth consecutive victory and took the overall record to 27–22 in their favour.

== Background ==
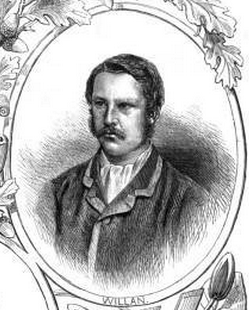
Frank Willan was the umpire for the race for a fourth consecutive year.

The Boat Race is a side-by-side rowing competition between the boat clubs of University of Oxford (sometimes referred to as the "Dark Blues") and the University of Cambridge (sometimes referred to as the "Light Blues"). The race was first held in 1829, and since 1845 has taken place on the 4.2-mile (6.8 km) Championship Course on the River Thames in southwest London. The rivalry is a major point of honour between the two universities; as of 2014 it is followed throughout the United Kingdom and broadcast worldwide. Oxford went into the race as reigning champions, having beaten Cambridge by 2 1/4 lengths in the previous year's race, and held the overall lead, with 26 victories to Cambridge's 22 (excluding the "dead heat" of 1877).

Oxford's coaches were G. C. Bourne (who rowed for Oxford in the 1882 and 1883 races), Tom Edwards-Moss (who rowed for the Dark Blues from 1875 to 1878) and Douglas McLean (an Oxford Blue five times between 1883 and 1887). Cambridge were coached by R. C. Lehmann (former president of the Cambridge Union Society and captain of the 1st Trinity Boat Club; although he had rowed in the trials eights for Cambridge, he was never selected for the Blue boat). The umpire for the race for the fifth year in a row was Frank Willan who won the event four consecutive times, rowing for Oxford in the 1866, 1867, 1868 and 1869 races.

According to author Wadham Peacock, Barnes Bridge was undergoing repair which had jeopardised the running of the race. It was also one of only a few occasions where the race was not held on a Saturday, this year taking place on a Wednesday.

== Crews ==
The Oxford crew weighed an average of 12 st 3.125 lb (77.4 kg), 3.125 pounds (1.4 kg) per rower more than their opponents. Cambridge saw two rowers with Boat Race experience return, including Graham Campbell Kerr and Charles Thurstan Fogg-Elliot. Six of the Light Blues had matriculated at Trinity College. The Oxford boat contained five former Blues including William Fletcher who was participating in his fourth Boat Race. Four of the Dark Blues were studying at Magdalen College. All of the competitors in the race were registered as British.

Although Oxford had four members of the previous year's race available, Fletcher was injured in practice and Vivian Nickalls was unwell. Cambridge's crew was considered to be powerful but technically deficient.

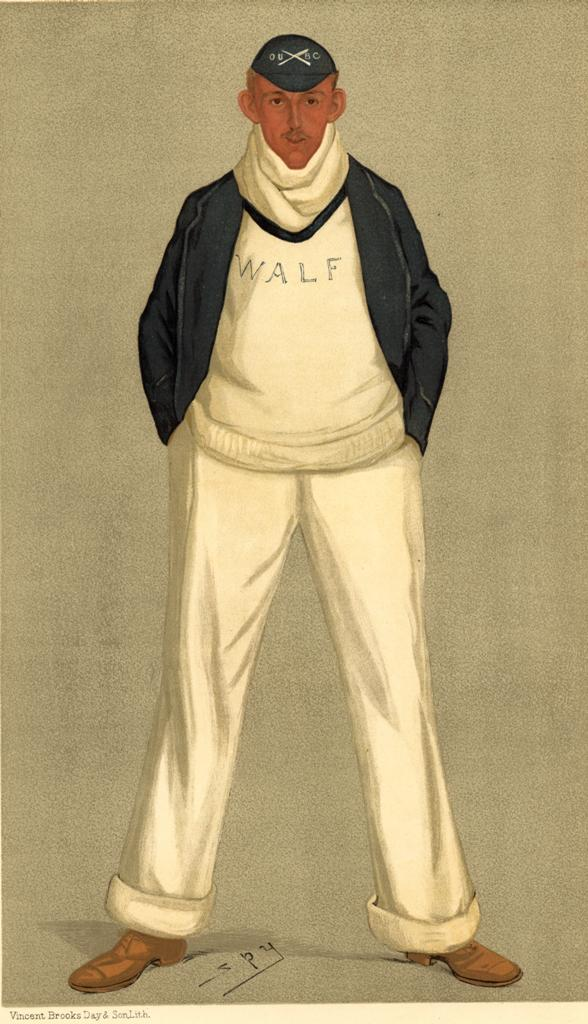
William Fletcher made his fourth consecutive appearance for Oxford.

Seat	Oxford			Cambridge		
Seat	Name	College	Weight	Name	College	Weight
Bow	H. B. Cotton	Magdalen	9 st 12 lb	G. A. H. Branson	1st Trinity	10 st 12 lb
2	J. A. Ford	Brasenose	11 st 13 lb	R. F. Bayford	Trinity Hall	11 st 9 lb
3	J. A. Morrison	New College	12 st 4.5 lb	C. T. Fogg-Elliot	Trinity Hall	11 st 10.5 lb
4	H. Legge	Trinity	12 st 13.5 lb	E. H. M. Waller	Corpus Christi	12 st 5.5 lb
5	V. Nickalls	Magdalen	13 st 4 lb	L. A. E. Olliivant	1st Trinity	13 st 3.5 lb
6	W. A. L. Fletcher (P)	Magdalen	13 st 8.5 lb	G. C. Kerr	1st Trinity	12 st 6 lb
7	C. M. Pitman	New College	13 st 0.5 lb	R. O. Kerrison	3rd Trinity	12 st 0 lb
Stroke	M. C. Pilkington	Magdalen	11 st 11 lb	T. G. E. Lewis	3rd Trinity	11 st 12 lb
Cox	L. Portman	University	7 st 7 lb	C. T. Agar	3rd Trinity	7 st 7 lb
Source: (P) – boat club president, Gerard Elin acted as non-rowing president for Cambridge.

== Race ==
The Championship Course, along which the race is conducted

Cambridge won the toss and elected to start from the Surrey station, handing the Middlesex side of the river to Oxford. With a good spring tide and a light breeze from the east, umpire Willan started the race at 4:35 p.m., with the Light Blues outrating their opponents at 40 strokes per minute, and taking an early lead. Oxford drew level and moved ahead, holding a length's lead by the Mile Post. With the advantage of the river's course to Cambridge, by Hammersmith Bridge the lead had been cut to half a length and at The Doves pub (almost 2 miles (3.2 km) along the course), the crews were once again level.

Along Chiswick, despite a higher stroke rate, Cambridge failed to move ahead and showed signs of tiredness, and Oxford began to move away again. By Barnes Bridge they were a length-and-a-half clear, but encountered difficult water there as a temporary dam that had been constructed created an eddy. Cambridge took advantage to reduce the deficit and pushed all the way to the finishing post, but Oxford won by 1 1/4 lengths. It was their fourth consecutive victory and in a time of 18 minutes 45 seconds, the fastest in the history of the event at the time.
