= The Boat Race 1856 =

13th Boat Race
- Date: 15 March 1856
- Winner: Cambridge
- Margin of victory: 1/2 length
- Winning time: 25 minutes 45 seconds
- Overall record (Cambridge–Oxford): 8–5
- Umpire: W. G. Rich

The 13th Boat Race took place on the River Thames on 15 March 1856. Typically held annually, the event is a side-by-side rowing race between crews from the Universities of Oxford and Cambridge. The race, the second to be held on the ebb tide, was won by Cambridge who beat Oxford by half a length.

== Background ==
The Boat Race is a side-by-side rowing competition between the University of Oxford (sometimes referred to as the "Dark Blues") and the University of Cambridge (sometimes referred to as the "Light Blues"). The race was first held in 1829, and since 1845 has taken place on the 4.2-mile (6.8 km) Championship Course on the River Thames in southwest London. It was the second race to be held on the ebb tide, the first time since the 1846 race, from Barker's Rails to Putney, approximately 1,200 yards (1,097 m) longer than the conventional course. Oxford went into the race as reigning champions, having defeated Cambridge by seven lengths in the previous race held in 1854. Cambridge led overall with seven wins to Oxford's five.

No Boat Race took place in 1855 – severe frost had caused both the Thames (from Oxford to Henley) and the River Cam to freeze, and heavy snow curtailed efforts to practice for the race. Instead the universities faced each other at the Henley Royal Regatta where Cambridge won the Grand Challenge Cup. Despite the victory, Cambridge agreed that they should propose the challenge to Oxford and did so during the October term; it was duly accepted. Both crews raced in boats constructed by Searle. The umpire for the race was W. G. Rich, the former Cambridge University Boat Club president who had rowed in both the March and December races of 1849. The starter was Edward Searle.

== Crews ==
The Cambridge crew weighed an average of 11 st 9.375 lb (73.9 kg), 8.75 pounds (4.0 kg) per rower more than their opponents. None of the competitors had taken part in a previous Boat Race.

Seat	Cambridge			Oxford		
Seat	Name	College	Weight	Name	College	Weight
Bow	J. P. Salter	Trinity Hall	9 st 13 lb	P. Gurdon	University	10 st 8 lb
2	F. C. Alderson	3rd Trinity	11 st 3 lb	W. F. Stocken	Exeter	10 st 1 lb
3	R. L. Lloyd	3rd Trinity	11 st 12 lb	R. Ingham Salmon	Exeter	10 st 10 lb
4	H. E. Fairrie	Trinity Hall	12 st 10 lb	A. B. Rocke	Christ Church	12 st 8.5 lb
5	H. Williams	Lady Margaret Boat Club	12 st 8 lb	Richard Townsend	Pembroke	12 st 8 lb
6	J. M'Cormick	Lady Margaret Boat Club	13 st 0 lb	Arthur P. Lonsdale	Balliol	11 st 4 lb
7	Herbert Snow	Lady Margaret Boat Club	11 st 8 lb	G. Bennett	New College	10 st 10 lb
Stroke	H. R. M. Jones	3rd Trinity	10 st 7 lb	J. T. Thorley	Wadham	9 st 12 lb
Cox	W. Wingfield	1st Trinity	9 st 0 lb	F. W. Elers	Trinity	9 st 2 lb
Source: (P) – boat club president

== Race ==
The Championship Course, along which the race was conducted in reverse from shown in 1856

Cambridge won the toss and elected to start from the Middlesex station, handing the Surrey side of the river to Oxford. The race commenced shortly after 11 a.m. with Oxford taking an early lead. Cambridge's number six, M'Cormick, caught a wave with his oar by the Ship pub and lost his seat, allowing Oxford to extend their lead. After recovering, Cambridge made a substantial push and passed Oxford to hold a small advantage, to hold a half-a-length by Barnes Bridge. Although they nearly increased their lead to a length, the Light Blues encountered a barge at Corney Reach which caused them to change course and lose ground, enabling Oxford to draw level once again. The crews exchanged leads with Oxford shooting Hammersmith Bridge with a half-length advantage. Cambridge steered closer to the shore and retook the lead. Despite a late surge from the Dark Blues, Cambridge passed the finish first, winning by half a length in a time of 25 minutes 45 seconds. It was Cambridge's first win in four attempts and their eighth win overall against Oxford's five victories.
