= Charles Theodore Barclay =

English rower

Charles Theodore Barclay (17 July 1867 – 30 March 1921) was an English rower who won the Silver Goblets at Henley Royal Regatta.

Barclay was born at Woodford, Essex. He was the fifth son of Henry Ford Barclay, of Monkhams, and his first wife Richenda Louisa Barclay (née Gurney). Although his connection with the banking Barclay family was distant, he was related through his mother to the Gurneys, another Quaker banking family. He was educated at Eton and Trinity College, Cambridge. He rowed for the winning Cambridge crew in the 1887 Boat Race. In 1887, he also won Silver Goblets at Henley Royal Regatta with Stanley Muttlebury.

Barclay became a stockbroker, and was a senior partner in the firm of Shephards and Co., London. He lived at Fanshaws, Hertford from 1909.

Barclay married Josephine Lister Harrison and had at least five children. He died in the library at Fanshaws at the age of 53.

== See also ==
- List of Cambridge University Boat Race crews
