= Frederick I. Pitman =

British rower

- Born: Frederick Islay Pitman; 18 April 1863; Edinburgh, Scotland
- Died: 22 January 1942 (aged 78); Kiln Green, Berkshire, England
- Education: Eton
- Alma mater: Trinity College, Cambridge
- Occupation: Stockbroker
- Known for: Co-founder of Rowe & Pitman; Rowed in the Boat Race 3 times
- Spouse: Helen Isabel Jamieson
- Children: 4, including Frederick Pitman
- Relatives: Charles Murray Pitman (brother); Sir Ronald Forbes Adam, 2nd Baronet (son-in-law); Sidney Maynard Smith (son-in-law); Noel Mason-MacFarlane (son-in-law)

Frederick (Freddie) Islay Pitman (18 April 1863 – 22 January 1942) was a British rower who rowed in the Boat Race three times and won the Diamond Challenge Sculls and the Wingfield Sculls in 1886.

== Biography ==
Pitman was born at Edinburgh, the third son of Frederick Pitman of 11 Great Stuart Street, and was one of eight brothers. His father was a Writer to the Signet and a director of the Union Bank of Scotland. He was educated at Eton and was in the crew that won the Ladies' Challenge Plate at Henley Royal Regatta in 1882. He then went to Trinity College, Cambridge, where he was a member of the Pitt Club and rowed for Third Trinity. He stroked Cambridge University in the Boat Race over three years. In 1884 Cambridge won the Boat Race, and in the same year Pitman won the Colquhoun Sculls and was in the winning crew in the Visitors' Challenge Cup at Henley. Cambridge lost the 1885 Boat Race and in the same year Pitman challenged in the Diamond Challenge Sculls and the Wingfield Sculls but was beaten in both by the holder W. S. Unwin. Pitman was Cambridge University Boat Club president in 1886 and his crew achieved a rare feat of winning that year's Boat Race after being behind at Barnes Bridge. In 1886, he also won the Diamond Challenge Sculls at Henley and the Wingfield Sculls.

In 1888 Pitman became a Writer to the Signet but later became a stockbroker, eventually as a co-founder (with George Duncan Rowe) of the firm of Rowe & Pitman of Austin Friars. In 1896 Pitman was elected to the Henley Royal Regatta management committee, filling the vacancy caused by the death of J. H. D. Goldie. Pitman umpired at the regatta from 1896 onwards. Pitman also umpired every Boat Race between 1903 and 1926: a total of 19 altogether.

In 1903 Pitman umpired his first University Boat Race, and was to start the race with an ancient pistol, which had worked perfectly for the previous umpire Colonel F. Willan. He pronounced the "Are you ready?", at which stage both crews squared their blades, and raised the pistol, but it stuck at half-cock and refused to fire. The boatman holding Cambridge could not hold them with squared blades in the fast tide and they slipped out of his hands while Oxford were being firmly held awaiting the pistol shot. Pitman was too concerned with getting the pistol to fire to notice that Cambridge had already drifted off and by the time that the pistol fired and both crews now actually rowed, Cambridge were already about one third of a length away and set off from there. The Cambridge crew were upset by the mistake and certainly did not row at their normal standard, but the effect of the error was disastrous for Oxford who never recovered.

In 1919, Pitman became Chairman of the Henley Royal Regatta management committee in place of the recently elected W. A. L. Fletcher, who had died from influenza. He held the role until 1944 and unlike his predecessors, had no desire to get involved directly in the running of the regatta, describing his position as "Chairman of the board with the particular function of finding the finance if Tom Steward over-reached himself".

Pitman died at his home, Scarletts, at Kiln Green, near Wargrave, in Berkshire at the age of 78.

Pitman married Helen Isabel Jamieson, daughter of James Auldjo Jamieson. Their son Frederick (1892–1963) rowed for Oxford and was an Olympic rower. They had three daughters; Anna Dorothy (1892–1972), who married Sir Ronald Forbes Adam, 2nd Baronet, and Isabel Mary (1891–?), who married the surgeon Sidney Maynard Smith (her son was the biologist John Maynard Smith); and Islay (1895/6–1947) who married Noel Mason-MacFarlane. Two of Pitman's brothers also raced in the University Boat Race: R.O. Pitman ("Rosie") rowed for Oxford in 1898 and 1899, and Charles Murray Pitman ("Cherry") became Oxford University Boat Club president and won four boat races from 1892 to 1895.

== Wins ==
=== Henley Royal Regatta ===
- 1882 – Ladies Plate (racing as Eton)
- 1884 – Visitors Challenge Cup (racing as Third Trinity, Cambridge)
- 1886 – Diamond Challenge Sculls (racing as Third Trinity, Cambridge)

=== Wingfield Sculls ===
- 1886

== See also ==
- List of Cambridge University Boat Race crews
