= The Boat Race 1885 =

Rowing race in England

42nd Boat Race
- Date: 28 March 1885
- Winner: Oxford
- Margin of victory: 2 1/2 lengths
- Winning time: 21 minutes 36 seconds
- Overall record (Cambridge–Oxford): 18–23
- Umpire: Robert Lewis-Lloyd (Cambridge)

The 42nd Boat Race took place on 28 March 1885. Held annually, the Boat Race is a side-by-side rowing race between crews from the Universities of Oxford and Cambridge along the River Thames. In a race umpired by former Cambridge rower Robert Lewis-Lloyd, the lead changed hands several times. Oxford won by a margin of 2 1/2 lengths in a time of 21 minutes 36 seconds. The victory took the overall record to 23–18 in favour of Oxford.

== Background ==
The Boat Race is a side-by-side rowing competition between the University of Oxford (sometimes referred to as the "Dark Blues") and the University of Cambridge (sometimes referred to as the "Light Blues"). First held in 1829, the race takes place on the 4.2 miles (6.8 km) Championship Course on the River Thames in southwest London. The rivalry is a major point of honour between the two universities; it is followed throughout the United Kingdom and as of 2014, broadcast worldwide. Cambridge went into the race as reigning champions, having won the previous year's race by 2 1/2 lengths, while Oxford held the overall lead, with 22 victories to Cambridge's 18 (excluding the "dead heat" of 1877).

Oxford's coach was G. C. Bourne, who had rowed for the Dark Blues in the 1882 and 1883 races. There is no record of who coached Cambridge, who were seriously disrupted in the build-up to the race, with Edric Wolseley Haig contracting mumps, J. C. Brown breaking a floating rib and William King Hardacre being introduced to the crew days prior to replace him. The umpire for the race was Robert Lewis-Lloyd (who had rowed for Cambridge four times between 1856 and 1859).

== Crews ==
The Oxford crew weighed an average of 12 st 6.75 lb (79.1 kg), 7.75 pounds (3.5 kg) more than their opponents. It was the heaviest crew to have ever featured in the Boat Race. Cambridge's crew contained four rowers who had Boat Race experience, including Fraser Elmslie Churchill and Sidney Swann, both of whom were participating in their third race. Similarly, Oxford saw four former Blues return, with Douglas McLean making his third appearance and rowing with his brother Hector for the first time.

The race featured one registered non-British participant in Oxford's number two, J. S. Clemons, who originated from Tasmania.

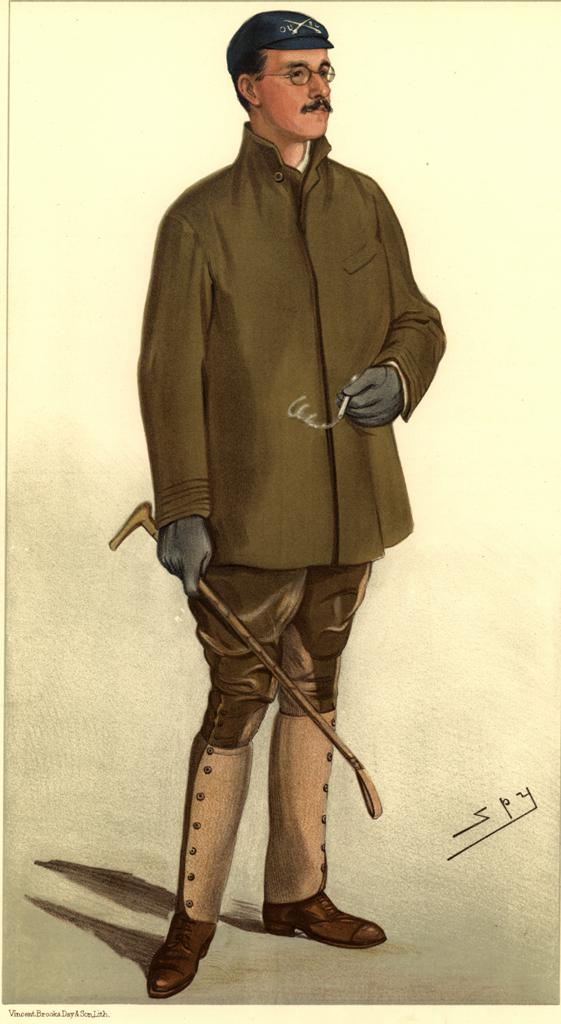
Caricature of Douglas McLean rowed in his third Boat Race, this time along with his brother Hector.

Seat	Oxford			Cambridge		
Seat	Name	College	Weight	Name	College	Weight
Bow	W. S. Unwin	Magdalen	10 st 10.5 lb	N. P. Symonds	Lady Margaret Boat Club	10 st 8 lb
2	J. S. Clemons	Corpus Christi	11 st 9 lb	W. K. Hardacre	Trinity Hall	10 st 8 lb
3	P. W. Taylor	Lincoln	13 st 6.5 lb	W. H. W. Perrott	1st Trinity	12 st 2.5 lb
4	C. R. Carter	Corpus Christi	13 st 2 lb	S. Swann	Trinity Hall	13 st 3.5 lb
5	H. McLean	New College	12 st 12 lb	F. E. Churchill (P)	3rd Trinity	13 st 2.5 lb
6	F. O. Wethered	Christ Church	12 st 6 lb	E. W. Haig	3rd Trinity	11 st 8 lb
7	D. H. McClean	New College	13 st 1.5 lb	R. H. Coke	Trinity Hall	12 st 4 lb
Stroke	H. Girdlestone	Magdalen	12 st 7 lb	F. I. Pitman	3rd Trinity	11 st 11.5 lb
Cox	F. J. Humphreys	Brasenose	8 st 2 lb	G. Wilson	1st Trinity	7 st 11 lb
Source: (P) – boat club president (R. S. de Haviland was Oxford's non-rowing president)

== Race ==
The Championship Course, along which the race is conducted

Cambridge were pre-race favourites. Oxford won the toss and elected to start from the Surrey station, handing the Middlesex side of the river to Cambridge. The race started at 12:26 p.m. in fine weather on a moderate tide. Although Oxford made the better start, Cambridge held a half-of-a-length lead by the time the crews passed the Craven Steps. With the advantage of the bend in the river, the Oxford stroke H. Girdlestone, without increasing the stroke rate, took his crew level, and ahead at the Mile Post. Although the Cambridge stroke Frederick Pitman tried to restore parity by encouraging a spurt, Oxford held the Light Blues off and by Hammersmith Bridge held a length's lead. Despite appearing "as if the crew going to pieces" after some difficult conditions, Oxford extended their lead to two lengths by The Doves pub. Approaching Barnes Bridge, the Dark Blues had to avoid a skiff, allowing Cambridge to come back at them, before pushing on once again on to win by 2 1/2 lengths in a time of 21 minutes 36 seconds, and took the overall record to 23–18 in Oxford's favour.

After the race it was noted that the Oxford number three, P. W. Taylor, had dislocated his shoulder but had continued despite his injury.
