= The Boat Race 1884 =

41st Boat Race
- Date: 7 April 1884
- Winner: Cambridge
- Margin of victory: 2 1/2 lengths
- Winning time: 21 minutes 39 seconds
- Overall record (Cambridge–Oxford): 18–22
- Umpire: Robert Lewis-Lloyd (Cambridge)

The 41st Boat Race took place on 7 April 1884. The Boat Race is an annual side-by-side rowing race between crews from the Universities of Oxford and Cambridge along the River Thames. The race, for which Robert Lewis-Lloyd acted as both umpire and starter for the first time, was won by Cambridge by margin of 2 1/2 lengths in a time of 21 minutes 39 seconds. The victory took the overall record in the event to 22–18 in Oxford's favour.

== Background ==
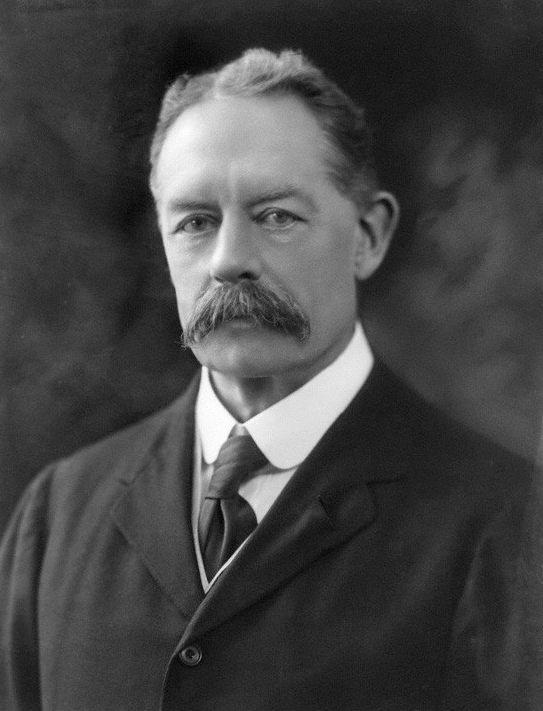
William Grenfell coached Oxford.

The Boat Race is a side-by-side rowing competition between the University of Oxford (sometimes referred to as the "Dark Blues") and the University of Cambridge (sometimes referred to as the "Light Blues"). First held in 1829, the race takes place on the 4.2 miles (6.8 km) Championship Course on the River Thames in southwest London. The rivalry is a major point of honour between the two universities; it is followed throughout the United Kingdom and as of 2014, broadcast worldwide. Oxford went into the race as reigning champions, having won the previous year's race by 3 1/2 lengths, and held the overall lead, with 22 victories to Cambridge's 17 (excluding the "dead heat" of 1877).

Oxford were coached by Tom Edwards-Moss (who rowed for the Dark Blues four times between the 1875 and the 1878 races) and William Grenfell (who represented Oxford in the 1877 and 1878 races). Herbert Edward Rhodes was the Cambridge coach; he had rowed for the Light Blues four times between 1873 and 1876 and was Cambridge University Boat Club president in 1875. The umpire for the race was Robert Lewis-Lloyd (who had rowed for Cambridge four times between 1856 and 1859) and for the first time acted as starter. He replaced Edward Searle (who had acted in that capacity since at least 1840) after the previous year's chaotic start when one of the crews failed to hear his command to start. The race had been postponed by two days because of the funeral of the Prince Leopold, Duke of Albany.

The Cambridge crew took the unusual step of taking a two-week break from practice in late-January, after which they settled on a crew which, according to Drinkwater, was "considerably faster than Oxford on the day of the race." Conversely he noted that the Dark Blue crew "did not come on at all well and were somewhat stale by the day of the race".

== Crews ==
The Cambridge crew weighed an average of 11 st 12.75 lb (75.5 kg), 0.25 pounds (0.1 kg) more than their opponents. Oxford saw two former Blues return to the crew, including A. R. Paterson who was rowing in his fourth consecutive Boat Race. The Cambridge crew contained four rowers with Boat Race experience, including Charles William Moore who was making his fourth appearance in the event. For the first time in three years, the race featured no non-British competitors.

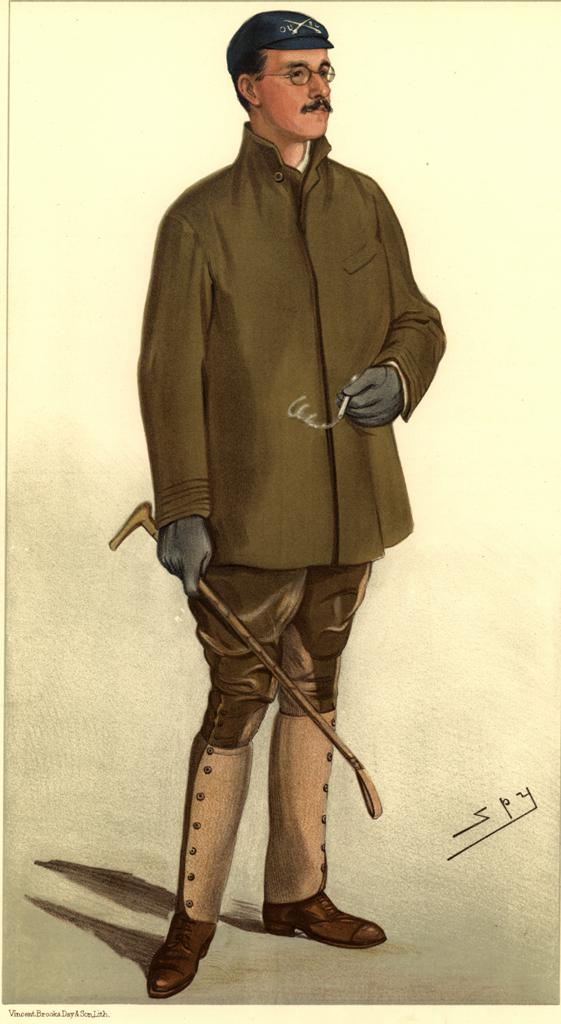
Caricature of Douglas McLean who rowed at number five for Oxford

Seat	Oxford			Cambridge		
Seat	Name	College	Weight	Name	College	Weight
Bow	A. G. Shortt	Christ Church	11 st 2 lb	R. C. M. G. Gridley (P)	3rd Trinity	10 st 6 lb
2	L. Stock	Exeter	11 st 0 lb	G. H. Eyre	Corpus Christi	11 st 3.5 lb
3	C. R. Carter	Corpus Christi	12 st 10 lb	F. Straker	Jesus	12 st 2 lb
4	P. W. Taylor	Lincoln	13 st 1 lb	S. Swann	Trinity Hall	13 st 3 lb
5	D. H. McClean	New College	12 st 11.5 lb	F. E. Churchill	3rd Trinity	13 st 2.5 lb
6	A. R. Paterson	Hertford	13 st 4 lb	E. W. Haig	3rd Trinity	11 st 6.75 lb
7	W. C. Blandy	Exeter	10 st 13 lb	C. W. Moore	Christ's	11 st 12.75 lb
Stroke	W. D. B. Curry	Exeter	10 st 4 lb	F. I. Pitman	3rd Trinity	11 st 11.5 lb
Cox	F. J. Humphreys	Brasenose	7 st 9 lb	C. E. Tyndale Biscoe	Jesus	8 st 2 lb
Source: (P) – boat club president (R. S. de Haviland was Oxford's non-rowing president)

== Race ==
The Championship Course, along which the race is conducted

Oxford won the toss and elected to start from the Surrey station, handing the Middlesex side of the river to Cambridge. The Light Blues made the quicker start and held a clear water advantage by the time the crews passed the Crab Tree pub. Cambridge kept this advantage to Hammersmith Bridge at which point Oxford spurted and recovered some of the deficit, but the Cantabrigians increased their stroke rate to go clear once again by Corney Reach. Despite the efforts of the Oxford stroke W. D. B. Curry to push his crew, according to Drinkwater, "at Barnes Bridge they fell to pieces." Cambridge went on to win by 2 1/2 lengths in a time of 21 minutes 39 seconds, recording their first victory in six years, and took the overall record to 22–18 in Oxford's favour.
