= Stanley Muttlebury =

English rower

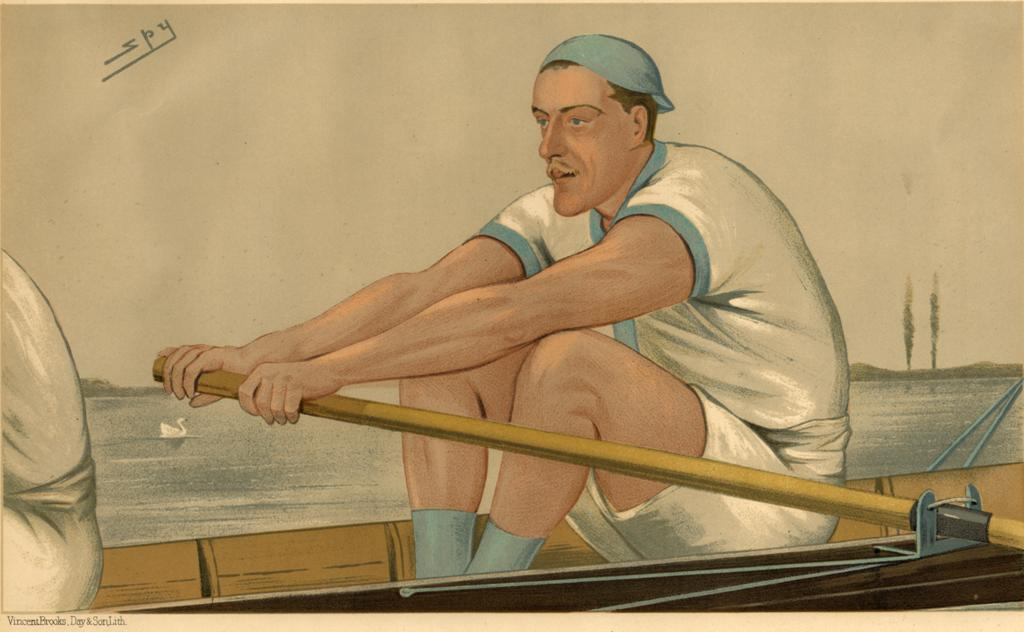
"One of the Presidents" Muttlebury as caricatured by Spy (Leslie Ward) in Vanity Fair, March 1890

Stanley Duff Muttlebury (29 April 1866 – 3 May 1933) was an English rower notable in the annals of rowing and the Oxford and Cambridge Boat Race.

== Parentage ==
Muttlebury was born 29 April 1866 in London, England, the only child of Captain James William Muttlebury and his wife, Catherine Elizabeth Stanley Duff, the daughter of Major Duff, 37th Regiment, Madras Native Infantry (The Grenadiers). He was baptised according to the rites of the Church of England on 4 September 1866 in Holy Trinity, Paddington, London, England.

His father, who was by profession a barrister, was trained in Toronto and called to the Bar of Upper Canada as a member of the Law Society of Upper Canada. He practised in Toronto, Canada West (now Ontario), but by 1851 returned to his birthplace Walcot, Bath, Somerset, and by 1856 migrated to the antipodes where he was a solicitor in St Kilda's, Melbourne, Victoria, Australia. For some time he was a director of the fledgling National Bank of Australasia which was founded in 1858. He returned to England by 1862, for he was married in Kew that year, and the subject was born in London four years later. Financially able to retire, he lived the life of an annuitant gentleman, dying in Geneva, Switzerland in 1886, when Muttlebury was a freshman Cambridge undergraduate.

== Education at Eton and Cambridge ==
Stanley became a new boy at Eton in the Easter term of 1880 at the age of thirteen. His tutor was the Rev. S. A. Donaldson, and he settled in quickly as a successful sportsman. Winning the school pulling in 1883, and the school sculling and hurdles in 1884, he moved on to row for the Eton Eight (1884), when Eton won the Ladies' Plate at Henley (beating Radley by seven lengths). Stanley also played in the Oppidan and mixed wall games.

At Cambridge University, he was admitted to Trinity College, and he was secretary of the Pitt Club. His entry in Venn's Alumni Cantabrigienses reveals some important details:

Adm. pens. at TRINITY, Oct. 8, 1885. [Only] s. of James [William], of 10, Orsett Terrace, London. B. [Apr. 29], 1866, in London. School, Eton. Matric. Michs. 1885. Rowing ‘blue,’ 1886–90, being in the winning crew 4 times; President, C.U.B.C., 1888-9. Steward of Henley Regatta. Adm. at the Inner Temple, Nov. 23, 1886. A member of the London Stock Exchange. Died May 3, 1933, at 3, Westbourne Crescent, London, W. (Book of Blues; Inns of Court; Who's Who; The Times, May 5, 1933.

He took his degree in 1890.

== Boat Race Career ==
At Cambridge, he excelled as a rower. Muttle, as he was called at the varsity and later in life, rowed for Cambridge in five successive Boat Races between 1886 and 1890, losing only once in 1890.

=== Race of 1886 ===
As a freshman, Muttlebury made his first appearance in the 1886 Boat Race in the six seat of the Cambridge crew. The prospects of a Cambridge victory were initially poor, with only two returning Blues, Symonds, and the President, Pitman. However, Steve Fairbairn was persuaded to return. With the addition of Muttlebury it was considered "the crew could not be but fast; yet the betting was very even when the fateful day arrived."

That year, Hammersmith Bridge was under repair. This gave only a narrow space between the boats should the two crews shoot the bridge abreast. Oxford won the toss and chose the Surrey side. Cambridge went out to an early lead of half a length at Craven Cottage, but Oxford slowly clawed this back by the Soap-works. The two crews were level at Hammersmith Bridge, but avoided a collision. After Hammersmith Bridge, rough water was encountered, and Oxford moved out to a lead of more than two lengths. However, Cambridge made a sustained effort from Barnes Bridge, and won by two-thirds of a length in a time of 22 minutes 30 seconds.

=== Race of 1887 ===
After winning the Boat Race of 1886, and the success of Cambridge College crews at Henley the same year, it was considered natural that Cambridge should put on a very fine crew for the Boat Race in 1887. Muttlebury was one of four returning Blues, including Steve Fairbairn and President, C.J. Bristowe at stroke. Muttlebury again rowed at six. However, Oxford had the services of the freshman G. Nickalls, and five time Boat Race oarsman,D. H. McClean. As a consequence, the crews recorded comparable times in trials at Putney, and the race was looked upon as very open.

Cambridge won the toss and chose the Surrey station, and with a good turn of speed were ahead by a length and a half at the Crab Tree. However, in spite of the bend being against them, Oxford closed the gap such that there was no daylight between the crews at Hammersmith Bridge. After shooting the bridge, rough water was encountered, and Cambridge took the advantage of the sheltered station to take a lead of three lengths. But at Duke's Meadow the shelter favoured Oxford, who began to move up very quickly on Cambridge, and at Barnes Bridge they had all but eliminated Cambridge's lead. They were drawing up very quickly when the oar of the Oxford seven man, Douglas McLean, broke in the gate. Reduced to rowing with only seven men, Oxford were unable to complete their challenge, and Cambridge won a fortunate race by two and a half lengths in 20 minutes 52 seconds.

=== Race of 1888 ===
In 1888, Muttlebury became the President of the Cambridge University Boat Club, a post he held for three successive terms.

Oxford should have produced a good crew, with Guy Nickalls, W.F.C. Holland, and H.R. Parker returning to row, George Drinkwater noted that they "did not develop into a good crew and were never looked on as possible winners", while Cambridge "had a surplus of excellent material". Cambridge won the toss, and chose the Surrey station, extracting a lead of six lengths by Hammersmith Bridge, and eventually won by seven lengths in a time of 20 minutes 48 seconds.

=== Race of 1889 ===
Stanley was President for C.U.B.C in his second year for the 1889 Boat Race. With all eight of the previous year's Blue Boat available, he chose an identical line-up, other than the coxswain. This was the only time in Boat Race history such a selection occurred. However, his decision attracted not inconsiderable criticism. The official centenary history of the Boat Race noted:

It is doubtful if it will ever be attempted again, for it had a very bad effect on Cambridge rowing. Very little trouble was taken with Trial Eights, since there were no places to fill in the University crew, which left a big blank to fill in the crew of 1890. Moreover, the keenness displayed in Beatrice practice was not as great as it should have been, and it is quite certain that the crew were not nearly as fast in'89 as they had been in '88.

Once again Cambridge won the toss, and chose the Surrey station. They had managed to achieve a lead of a length and a half by Hammersmith Bridge and eventually won by three lengths, in a time of 20 minutes 14 seconds.

=== Race of 1890 ===
The 1890 Boat Race marked Muttlebury's third and final year as Cambridge President. He started off at a disadvantage due to his being the only Old Blue in residence at the beginning of training. The Boat Race historian Dickie Burnell would note that "Muttlebury had to pay the price of having rowed in 1889 the same crew which had represented Cambridge in 1888," although there was possibly little between the crews. The Oxford crew of Vivian and Guy Nickalls, Lord Ampthill, W. A. L. Fletcher and R.R.P. Rowe had more experience, and after a tough battle, triumphed by one length to hand Muttlebury his first and only Boat race defeat.

== Other sporting endeavours ==
In other rowing events at Cambridge, Muttlebury won the pairs in 1886, 1887, 1889 and 1890, and the Colquhoun Sculls in 1888. At Henley he won the Silver Goblets in 1886, 1887, and 1889, as well as being a member of the winning Thames Rowing Club crew for the Stewards' Challenge Cup in 1894. Stanley Muttlebury exhibited an almost faultless style: he used his weight and strength to the utmost.

Muttlebury was also involved in other university-level watergoing sports including water polo as is evinced in the following extract from the Cambridge Review of 15 October 1891:

The Inter-Varsity water polo match, is fixed for next Friday, at the Crown Baths, Kennington Oval, at 7.20 pm. Owing to the want of a covered swimming bath at Cambridge, Water Polo can only be played at the sheds, and at the close of a bad season like the present men are necessarily very much out of practice. Our team will feel the loss of Muttlebury, who is unable to play, and our opponents have a strong team.

== Family ==
Stanley Duff Muttlebury married Christina Augusta Parkinson on 30 April 1902 in an Anglican ceremony at Christ Church, Lancaster Gate, London, England. The bride's birth was registered in the Fylde division of Lancashire in the March quarter of 1875. She was the elder daughter of Major General C.F. Parkinson of Bays Hill Court, Cheltenham, Gloucestershire, and granddaughter of Mrs Nicholson, of Lancaster Gate.

The children of the marriage were: Ralph Stanley Muttlebury, who was born in 1903 in Paddington, London, England, and Eileen Joyce Muttlebury (from 1935, Joyce, Mrs William Dalrymple Tennant), who was born in 1905 in Paddington, London, England. Ralph Muttlebury continued with the family tradition of being educated at Cambridge University and was on the committee of the Cambridge Footlights. In 1926, Ralph married Gwen Parsons (from the Parsons Shipbuilding family), of Melcombe court, Dorset Square, London. Gwen Muttlebury (nee Parsons) worked in the Admiralty Operations Room Whitehall during the Second World War.

Gwen and Ralph meanwhile, had a son, Peter George Stanley Muttlebury, born on 3 June 1929 (died at home in Yorkshire, 24 August 1975). In 1952, Peter married Gillian Joan Hoare, daughter of W.D.N. Hoare (a descendant of the banking profession's Henry Hoare II). Peter Muttlebury enjoyed a successful advertising career in partnership (MCR Advertising) with John Ritchie, father to Guy Ritchie.

== Post-University Career ==
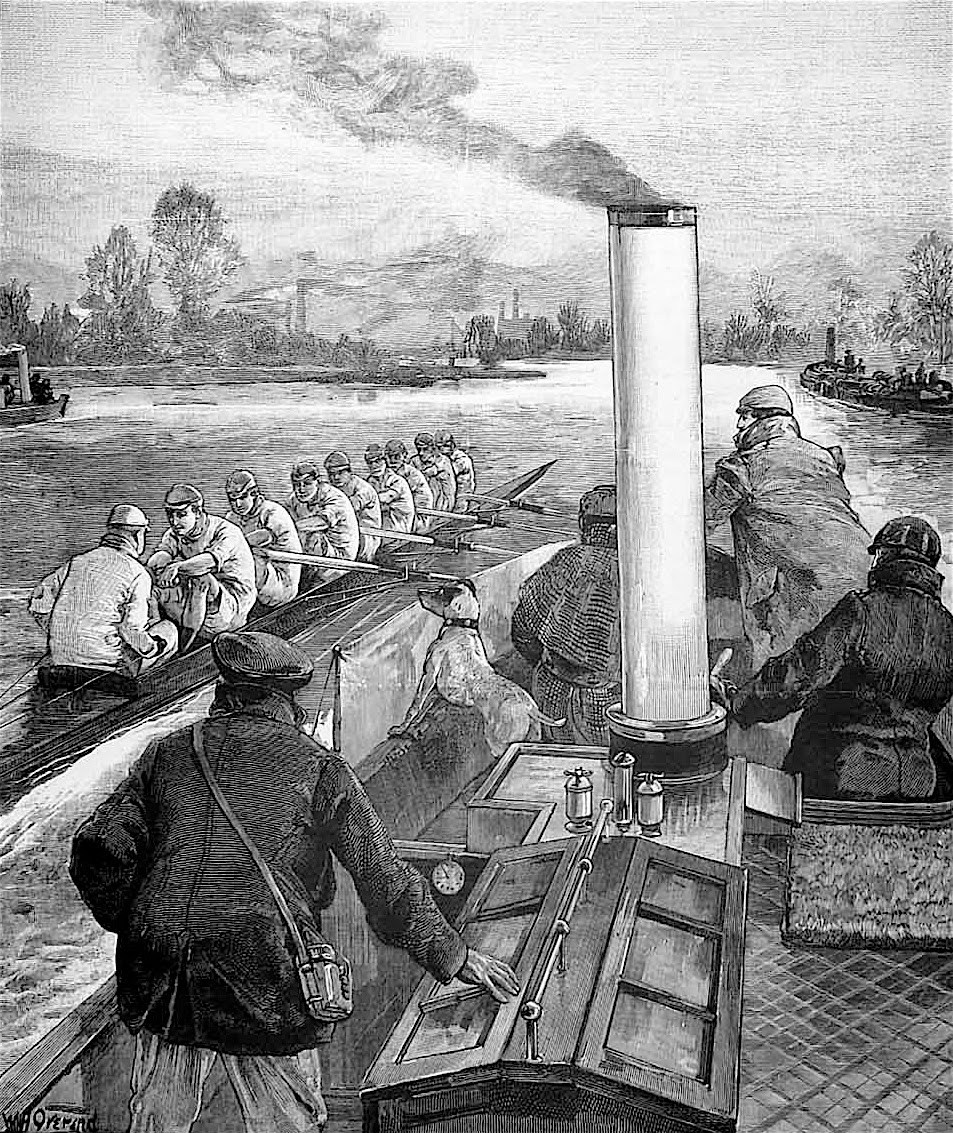
Mr. Muttlebury coaching the Cambridge crew from a Steam Launch in 1892

Stanley Muttlebury, who was first called to the Bar at the Inner Temple in 1886, ultimately chose a career as a stockbroker rather than pursuing that of a barrister after coming down from Cambridge. Characteristically perhaps, he seems to have arrived in that profession as a result of his involvement in rowing:

Mr. S.H. [sic] Muttlebury, a coach, is a member of the House. Twenty-five years ago a Stock Exchange crew met the London Rowing Club in a match on Thames; it was there that they captured the Mighty Muttle for the business.

== Death ==
Muttlebury died on 3 May 1933 at his home in Westbourne Crescent, London, at the age of 67. In his obituary, printed in The Times on Friday, 5 May 1933, Stanley was described as "undoubtedly the greatest oar ever produced by Cambridge".

His funeral, conducted by the Venerable the Archdeacon of London, in St James's Church Sussex Gardens, was attended by rowing greats, including former Oxford University Boat Club members Guy Nickalls, Harcourt Gold and R. P. P. Rowe. His body lies buried in Putney Vale cemetery, London, England. His widow, who later resided in Basingstoke, Hampshire, survived him until 9 July 1971, when she died, according to The Times, a great-grandmother, in her 97th year.

Contemporaries writing to The Times to add to his obituary notice called attention to his extraordinary physical prowess and natural aptitude for rowing, traits accompanied by his extraordinary mildness, good manners, and natural kindness (compare Dom Placid Muttlebury above):

Muttlebury had a natural aptitude which amounted to a genius for rowing, and, as he was not only massively large and full of courage but herculean in muscular strength, it was inevitable that he should be an outstanding exponent of oarsmanship. Added to this, he came to his prime when rowing was in a transitional stage, when the old methods of the straight back and the body catch, suited to the fixed seat and the short slide, had necessarily to be superseded by methods required by the long-slide. I consider that long-slide rowing sprang suddenly to perfection in Muttlebury, that on him this new (or partially new) art was built...

With regard to the man himself ...[he] had the most charming "good manners." It was a trait natural to him which all must have noticed... [W]ith this, somewhat unusually, went a refusal to hurt. I have never known "Muttle" to speak unkindly of anyone; and I have never known him [to] swagger.

== In literature ==
Stanley Muttlebury was an inspiration to many people. His wide circle of friends included Rudolph Lehmann (Founder of The Granta Magazine (Cambridge University) comic writer, rower, barrister, and Liberal MP) and Douglas Jardine, Captain of the England Cricket team. Lehmann paid a warm tribute to his good friend in his book, In Cambridge Courts, describing him as The Mighty Muttle, and that brawny king of men. It is said that Mark Twain drew on this tribute for his Adventures of Huckleberry Finn.

== Sources ==
- Advancing with the Army: Medicine, the Professions, and Social Mobility in the British Isles, 1790 to 1850 Marcus Ackroyd, Laurence Brockliss, Michael Moss, Kate Retford, and John Stevenson, Oxford University Press, 2006, p. 281 (for the career and emigration to Upper Canada of the grandfather and uncles, including Rutherford of the subject, Stanley Duff Muttlebury, who is erroneously called Frederick Duff Muttlebury in footnote 81, ibid.)
- Alumni Cantabrigienses, Venn, J. A., comp., London, England: Cambridge University Press, 1922–1954. (lists the subject and his uncle, Rutherford Muttlebury, and great-uncle, the Rev. John Muttlebury, as the only members of the family to have attended that institution) N.B. Ralph Muttlebury (the only son of Stanley Muttlebury) also attended Cambridge University and did row in the trial eight; although he was never as powerful a rower as his father. He was also on the committee of the Cambridge Footlights Review.
- Chronological Notes Containing The Rise, Growth And Present State of the English Congregation of the Order of St Benedict, Ralph Weldon, 1881, pp. 15, 21, 28, 29, 33, 42, and 227.
- Court and Private Life in the Time of Queen Charlotte: Being the Journals of Charlotte Louise Henrietta Papendiek, Charlotte Louise Henrietta Papendiek, 1887, p. 69 (re Mrs Muttlebury at Court)
- Descendants of John and Mary Jane (Cunningham) Gillespie Paul Wesley Prindle, printed by Van Dyck Print. Co., 1973, pp. 62–63 (re Rutherford Muttlebury's son, George Augustus Muttlebury (1847–1936), grandson, Charles Robert Muttlebury (1883–1961), his wife Clyna, and great-grandson, George John Muttlebury (1918–1993), B.Eng, 1941, of McGill University, Montreal, P.Q., and Victoria, B.C.)
- A Dictionary of Universal Biography by Albert Montefiore Hyamson, p. 452, col. 1 (for the lifespan dates of Lt-Col. George Muttlebury, C.B. & K.W.)
- Directory of Geographic Names Cartography & Graphics Section, Nevada Department of Transportation, 1981, 93 pp. (for the Nevada places which include the Muttlebury surname)
- Edward of Kent: The Life Story of Queen Victoria's Father David Duff, 1973, p. 61 (for Mrs Muttlebury's role as his wetnurse)
- English and Welsh Priests, 1558–1800: A Working List, Dom Aidan Bellenger, Downside Abbey, 1984 (p. 186, cites the Dom Placid as John rather than George Muttlebury and supplies his lifespan dates as 1563–1632, while Dom Francis lived 1610–1697)
- A full and circumstantial account of the Battle of Waterloo: The Second Restoration of Louis XVIII; and the Deportation of Napoleon Buonaparte to the Island of St Helena, and every recent particular relative to his conduct and mode of his life in his exile. Together with an interesting account of the affairs of France and Biographical Sketches of the Most Distinguished Waterloo Heroes, Christopher Kelly, London, 1818, p. 95 (for the conduct of Col. George Muttlebury at Waterloo)
- The Gentleman's Magazine, 1825, p. 285, col. 2 (for Mrs Muttlebury's role as wetnurse or foster-mother to Princess Charlotte, later the Queen of Württemberg, in reporting the former's death, at Wilton, near Taunton, in her 90th year)
- The Gentleman's Magazine, vol. 56, New Series 196, London, 1854 (January to June inclusive), ed. Sylvanus Urban, pp. 202–203 (lengthy obituary detailing the military career and birthplace of Col. George Muttlebury, C.B. & K.W.)
- A history of Upper Canada College, 1829–1892: with contributions by Old Upper Canada Boys, Lists of Head-Boys, Exhibitioners, University Scholars and Medallists, and a Roll of the School, George Dickson and G. Mercer Adam, comp. and ed., Toronto: Rowsell and Hutchison, 1893, pp. 296–297.
- An Index to Printed Pedigrees Contained in County and Local Histories, the Herald's Visitations and in the more important Genealogical Collections Charles Bridger, London: John Russell Smith, 1867, p. 112 (refers to the pedigree of Muttlebury of Jurdens, another variant of the name of their Somerset estate, as being printed on p. 120 of Sir Thomas Phillipps, Bart's 1838 private edition of the consequently scarce Visitation of Somerset, 1623. With additions from earlier Visitations and Continuations by R. Mundy)
