= Robert Lewis-Lloyd =

British rower (1836–1915)

Robert Lewis-Lloyd (9 January 1836 – 7 September 1915) was a Welsh rower and barrister who was High Sheriff of Radnorshire and who umpired the Boat Race between 1881 and 1888.

Lewis-Lloyd was born at Cardigan, Ceredigion, the son of Thomas Lewis-Lloyd of Nantgwyllt, Radnorshire and his wife Anna Davies. One of his sisters was the mountaineer Emmeline Lewis Lloyd.

He was educated at Eton College and was admitted at Trinity College, Cambridge, but migrated to Magdalene College, Cambridge. Lewis-Lloyd rowed for Cambridge in the Boat Race in the 1856 race when they won and in the 1857 race. He was C.U.B.C. President in 1858 when Cambridge won the Boat Race again, and also won the Grand Challenge Cup at Henley Royal Regatta. He was president for the 1859 race when Cambridge sank in the Boat Race.

Lewis-Lloyd was admitted at the Inner Temple on 18 January 1860 and was called to the bar on 6 June 1864. He married Mary Anne Jane Lewis on 6 June 1865. He was a J.P. and Deputy Lieutenant for Radnorshire and was High Sheriff of Radnorshire in 1872. From 1881 to 1888 he was umpire of the Boat Race. He umpired the 1883 fiasco when the elderly starter Edward Searle, who had started the race since the 1840s, was inaudible to the crews. The race took place in the dark, there was a blizzard and the crews only set off when it was apparent that the following steamers were bearing down on them. The umpire subsequently became the starter and by 1887 Lloyd was starting the race with a pistol.

== See also ==
- List of Cambridge University Boat Race crews
