= Douglas McLean (rower) =

English rower and cricketer

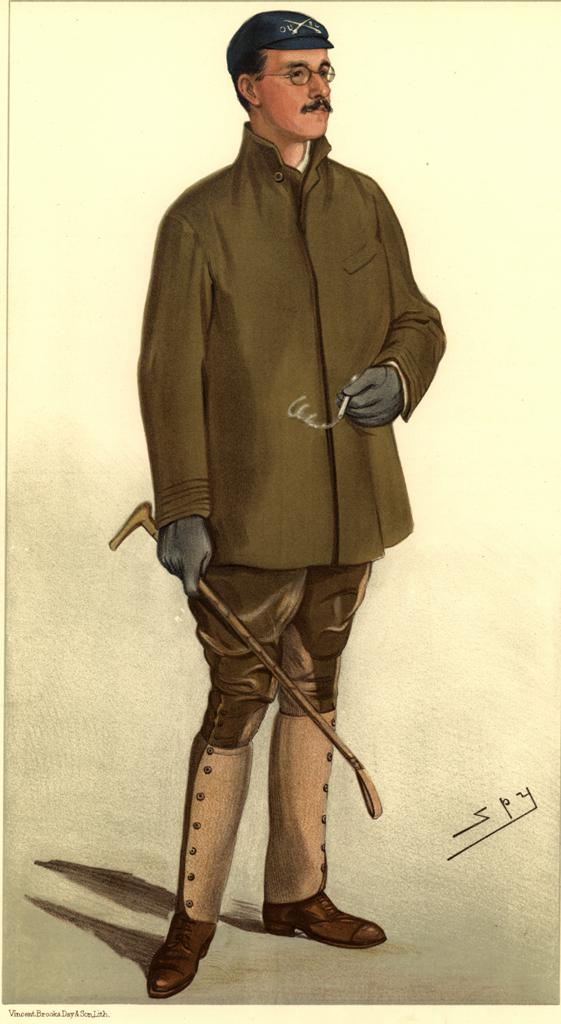

Personal information
- Full name: Douglas Hamilton McLean
- Born: 18 March 1863; Sydney, Australia
- Died: 5 February 1901 (aged 37); Johannesburg, Transvaal

Domestic team information
- Years: Team
- 1896: Somerset

Career statistics
Competition	FC
Matches	1
Runs scored	13
Batting average	13.00
100s/50s	0/0
Top score	9*
Catches/stumpings	0/–
- Source: CricketArchive, 22 December 2015

Douglas Hamilton McLean (18 March 1863 – 5 February 1901) was a British rower who rowed in the Boat Race five times and won Silver Goblets at Henley Royal Regatta. He was also a cricketer who played one match for Somerset in 1896.

== Biography ==
McLean was born in Sydney, the son of John Donald McLean, colonial treasurer of Queensland, Australia. He went to England, where he was educated at Eton College and made his first appearance at Henley in the Eton eight, winning the Ladies' Challenge Plate in 1882. He went on to New College, Oxford where he rowed in the Oxford crew in the Boat Race five times between 1883 and 1887, winning the 1883 and 1885 races. He won the University Pairs for New College in 1885 and also Silver Goblets at Henley with his brother, Hector McLean. In 1886 the McLean brothers were beaten in the final of the Silver Goblets by Stanley Muttlebury and Fraser Churchill. McLean was in Australia in December 1886 when he played a match for Geelong Cricket Club and then in India at the start of 1887, but returned in time to take part in his fifth boat race. During the race McLean's oar broke. Oxford were behind at Barnes Railway Bridge, but Cambridge moved into rougher water too far over to the Surrey bank and Oxford were expecting to push through when the disaster struck. Guy Nickalls, then in his first Boat Race, recorded "Then, 'Ducker' McLean broke his oar off short at the button. With the station in our favour and him out of the boat, we could have won even then, but 'Ducker' funked the oncoming penny steamers and, instead of jumping overboard as he should have done, we had to lug his now useless body along, to lose the finish." At Henley the McLeans were again runners up in Silver Goblets to Muttlebury and Charles Theodore Barclay.

McLean's brother Hector died at the beginning of 1888, and Douglas started as a rowing coach. He coached the Oxford crews, which went on to win over a five-year period. Otherwise he lived in Somerset. On 16 June 1888, he was commissioned as a second lieutenant in the North Somerset Yeomanry, he was promoted to lieutenant on 22 October 1892, and to captain on 4 October 1893. In the 1896 cricket season, he made a single first-class cricket appearance as wicket-keeper for Somerset against a Cambridge University team in which W. G. Grace, Jr. opened the batting. From the tailend, McLean scored 9 not out in the first innings and 4 runs in the second innings. He was also "a fair shot, a very painstaking billiard-player, and a dignified person, who was equally imperturbable whether sitting as a Justice of the Peace or watching a close boat race". In 1898 McLean collaborated with William Grenfell in authoring Rowing and Punting, the fourth and final volume for The Suffolk Sporting Series on Sport. The work was commissioned from Bertram Fletcher Robinson and edited by Henry Howard, 18th Earl of Suffolk.

After the outbreak of the Second Anglo-Boer War in late 1899, McLean volunteered for active service with the Imperial Yeomanry, where he was commissioned in the 69th (Sussex) Company on 28 March 1900, with the rank of lieutenant in army. He was promoted to captain in the army on 16 August 1900, and later served under the military governor of Pretoria. He died of enteric fever in Johannesburg at the age of 37. He is commemorated on the Boer War memorial in the churchyard of St Mary the Virgin, Battle, East Sussex, and on the Eton College memorial, in Lapton's Chapel within Eton College Chapel.

== See also ==
- List of Oxford University Boat Race crews
