= The Boat Race 1883 =

40th Boat Race
- Date: 15 March 1883
- Winner: Oxford
- Margin of victory: 3 1/2 lengths
- Winning time: 21 minutes 18 seconds
- Overall record (Cambridge–Oxford): 17–22
- Umpire: Robert Lewis-Lloyd (Cambridge)

The 40th Boat Race, an annual side-by-side rowing race between crews from the Universities of Oxford and Cambridge along the River Thames, took place on 15 March 1883. Following confusion at the start of the race and a snow storm during the event, Oxford won by a margin of 3 1/2 lengths in a time of 21 minutes 18 seconds.

== Background ==
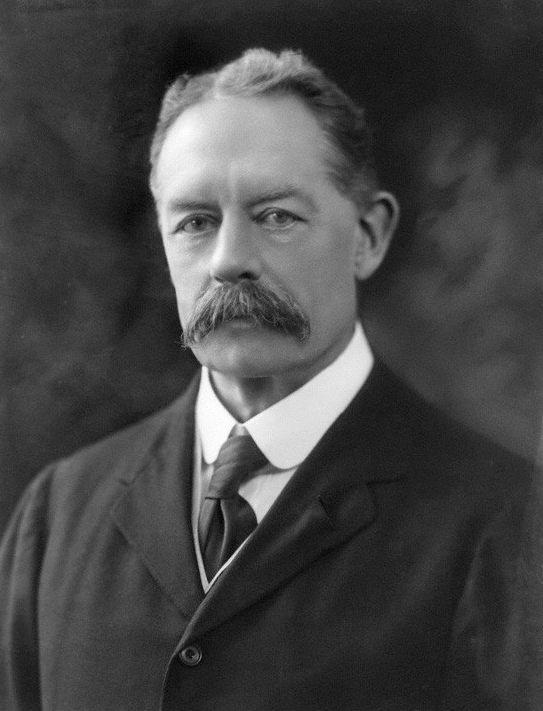
William Grenfell coached the Oxford crew.

The Boat Race is a side-by-side rowing competition between the University of Oxford (sometimes referred to as the "Dark Blues") and the University of Cambridge (sometimes referred to as the "Light Blues"). The race was first held in 1829, and since 1845 has taken place on the 4.2-mile (6.8 km) Championship Course on the River Thames in southwest London. Oxford went into the race as reigning champions, having won the previous year's race by seven lengths, and held the overall lead, with 21 victories to Cambridge's 17 (excluding the "dead heat" of 1877).

Cambridge's coaches were John Goldie (who had rowed for Cambridge four times in the 1869, 1870, 1871 and 1872 races) and Herbert Edward Rhodes (who was also a four-time Blue, rowing in each race between 1873 and 1876). Oxford were coached by William Grenfell (who rowed for Oxford in the 1877 and 1878 races) and Walter Bradford Woodgate (who represented Oxford in the 1862 and 1863 races). Woodgate also briefly coached the Light Blues the same year. The umpire for the race was Robert Lewis-Lloyd (who had rowed for Cambridge four times between 1856 and 1859) and the starter was Edward Searle, who had fulfilled that position since the 1840 race.

Oxford chose to discard their old boat which they had used since the 1878 race in favour of one built by Harry Clasper. The Cambridge crew was subject to several late changes to the stroke seat; three times in quick succession the occupant was replaced as a result of illness and tactical decisions.

== Crews ==
The Cambridge crew weighed an average of 12 st 2.75 lb (77.3 kg), 4.75 pounds (2.2 kg) more than their opponents. Oxford's crew contained six former Blues, including A. R. Paterson, L. R. West and cox E. H. Lyon, all of whom were making their third appearance in the event. Cambridge saw five participants return, including the Cambridge University Boat Club president Charles William Moore and Peter Wilson Atkin who were rowing in their third Boat Race. The race featured two non-British participants: Cambridge's Steve Fairbairn (whose brother Charles had competed in the 1879 race) was born in Victoria in Australia, while Oxford's George Quinlan Roberts hailed from Tasmania.

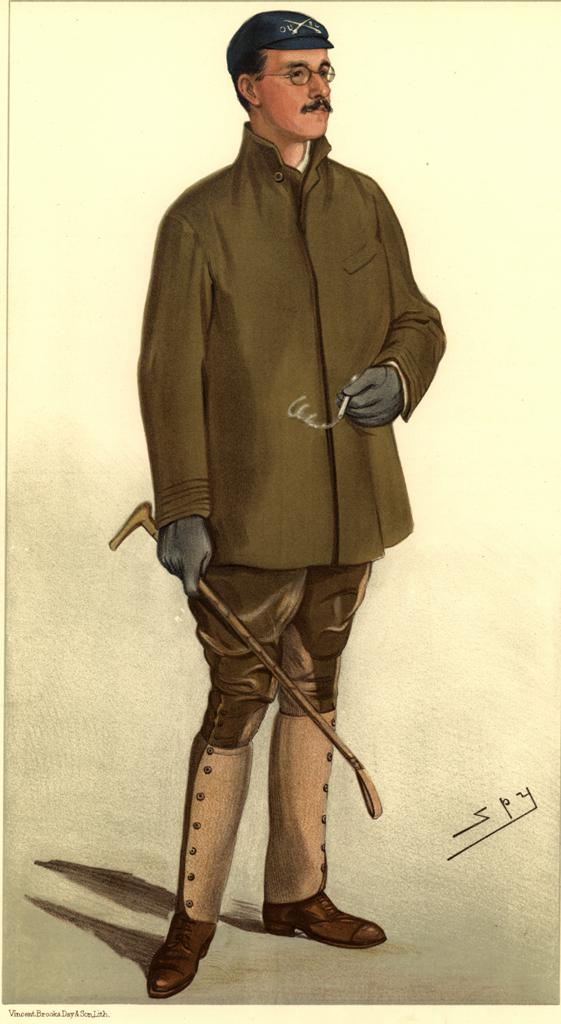
Caricature of Douglas McLean who rowed at number five for Oxford

Seat	Oxford			Cambridge		
Seat	Name	College	Weight	Name	College	Weight
Bow	G. C. Bourne	New College	10 st 11.5 lb	R. C. M. G. Gridley	3rd Trinity	10 st 7 lb
2	R. S. de Haviland	Corpus Christi	11 st 4 lb	F. W. Fox	1st Trinity	12 st 2 lb
3	G. S. Fort	Hertford	12 st 0 lb	C. W. Moore	Christ's	11 st 13 lb
4	E. L. Puxley	Brasenose	12 st 6.5 lb	P. W. Atkin	Jesus	12 st 1 lb
5	D. H. McClean	New College	13 st 2.5 lb	F. E. Churchill	3rd Trinity	13 st 4 lb
6	A. R. Paterson	Hertford	13 st 1 lb	S. Swann	Trinity Hall	12 st 12 lb
7	G. Q. Roberts	Hertford	11 st 1 lb	S. Fairbairn	Jesus	13 st 4 lb
Stroke	L. R. West	Christ Church	11 st 0 lb	F. C. Meyrick	Trinity Hall	11 st 7 lb
Cox	E. H. Lyon	Hertford	8 st 1 lb	P. L. Hunt	Cavendish	8 st 1 lb
Source: (P) – boat club president

== Race ==
The Championship Course, along which the race is conducted

Cambridge were pre-race favourites although former Oxford rower and author George Drinkwater noted that the public had been unaware of the significant improvements from Oxford following their transition to the Clasper vessel. Oxford won the toss and elected to start from the Surrey station, handing the Middlesex side of the river to Cambridge. The race started at 5:39 p.m. and quickly descended into chaos: darkness was falling and it became quickly apparent that the Cambridge crew had not heard the command to "go" from the starter Searle. By now, according to Oxford's bow G. C. Bourne, he was "old with a feeble voice", and although the Oxford stroke L. R. West saw Searle drop his handkerchief, and set off, the Cambridge boat did not move.

West seized the initiative and took the Dark Blue crew off to an immediate lead which, despite a "blinding snowstorm", they extended to three lengths by Hammersmith Bridge. They went on to win by 3 1/2 lengths in a time of 21 minutes 18 seconds. It was Oxford's fourth consecutive victory and took the overall record to 22–17 in their favour.
