= Nickalls =

- Tom Nickalls (1827–1899), British stockjobber, father of Guy and Vivian Nickalls
- Guy Nickalls (1866–1935), British rower who competed in the 1908 Olympics
- Vivian Nickalls (1871–1947), British rower
- Silver Goblets & Nickalls' Challenge Cup, rowing event for men's coxless pairs at the annual Henley Royal
- Guy Oliver Nickalls (1899–1974), British rower who competed in the 1920 and 1928 Olympics, son of Guy Nickalls
- Patteson Nickalls (c.1836–1910), British stockbroker and politician, father of Cecil and Womersley Nickalls
- Cecil Patteson Nickalls (1877–1925), British polo and rugby player
- Patteson Womersley Nickalls (1877–1946), British polo player
