= Harold Baillie-Grohman =

British admiral (1888–1978)

Vice-Admiral Harold Baillie-Grohman CB DSO OBE
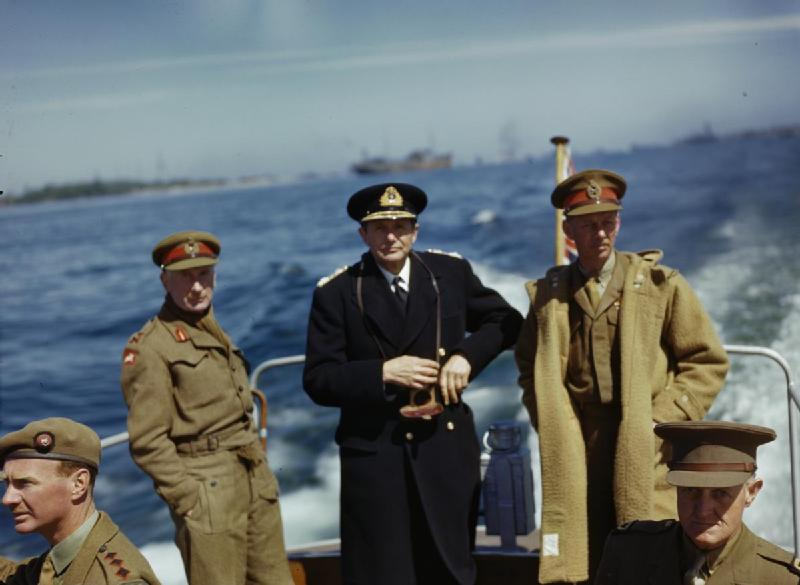
- Baillie-Grohman (centre) in Kiel Harbour, Germany, on 19 May 1945
- Born: 16 January 1888; Victoria, British Columbia, Canada
- Died: 23 September 1978 (aged 90); Chichester, West Sussex, United Kingdom
- Relatives: William Baillie Grohman (father)
- Military career
- Allegiance: United Kingdom
- Branch: Royal Navy
- Service years: 1903–1946
- Rank: Vice-Admiral
- Commands: Flag Officer-in-Charge, Kiel and Schleswig-Holstein (1945–46); Flag Officer-in-Charge, Harwich (1944); Flag Officer-in-Charge, Isle of Wight (1942); HMS Ramillies (1938–40); HMS St Vincent (1936–38); 1st Destroyer Flotilla (1934–36); HMS Keppel (1934–36); HMS Duncan (1934); 1st Minesweeper Flotilla (1923–25); HMS Leamington (1923–25); HMS Crocus (1922–23); HMS Totnes (1917–19); HMS Gentian (1916–17); HMS Ghurka (1915–16); HMS Lively (1914–15)
- Conflicts: First World War; Second World War
- Awards: Companion of the Order of the Bath; Distinguished Service Order; Officer of the Order of the British Empire; Mentioned in Despatches (3); Knight of the Order of Leopold (Belgium); Order of the Star of Ethiopia; Order of Brilliant Jade, Red Cravat with Blue and White Border (China)

Vice-Admiral Harold Tom Baillie-Grohman, CB, DSO, OBE (16 January 1888 – 23 September 1978) was a Royal Navy officer who commanded the naval evacuation of the British Army from Greece in 1941.

== Early life ==
Born in Victoria, British Columbia, Canada, Baillie-Grohman was the son of the writer William Baillie Grohman and of Florence, née Nickalls, daughter of Tom Nickalls.

== Naval career ==
=== 1903-1918 ===
Baillie-Grohman entered HMS Britannia as a cadet in 1903 and was promoted to lieutenant in 1909. In March 1914, at the start of the First World War, he was given command of the destroyer HMS Lively, and subsequently commanded the large Tribal Class destroyer HMS Ghurka on the Dover Patrol from August 1915 until January 1916. In Portsmouth for repairs, a boiler exploded and the Ghurka had to be decommissioned and the crew paid off.

Baillie-Grohman was appointed to the new sloop HMS Gentian, and sent to join the Grand Fleet at Scapa Flow on minesweeper duties. There were normally around 20 minesweepers divided into two flotillas, working in pairs. He was blown off the bridge of HMS Gentian, injuring his hip. Promoted to lieutenant commander in 1917 to command the 'A' Sweep Flotilla from the paddle minesweeper HMS Totnes. He was awarded the Distinguished Service Order in 1918 for his part in minesweeping operations. In his memoir, Baillie-Grohman later wrote an account of minesweeping on the Scapa Flow approaches as a young naval officer, including a description of the introduction of the Paravane.

=== 1919-1939 ===
Immediately after the First World War, Baillie-Grohman was employed on minesweeping operations off the coast of Belgium, then commanded the sloop HMS Crocus in the Persian Gulf 1921-1922. He was appointed an Officer of the Order of the British Empire in 1923 and was promoted to commander. After commanding the 1st Minesweeper Flotilla from 1923 to 1925 in HMS Leamington, he was posted to Australia as Assistant Chief of the Naval Staff at the Navy Office, Melbourne, from 1925 to 1927.

In 1928, he attended the Staff College, Camberley, and was executive officer of HMS Tiger until 1930, when he was promoted to captain. From 1931 to 1933, he was the head of the British naval mission to China in Nanjing, with the rank of commodore in the Chinese Navy.,

He commanded HMS St Vincent, the Royal Naval Training establishment at Gosport between 1936 and 1938, and then was made Captain of the Revenge-class battleship HMS Ramillies sailing to join the Mediterranean Fleet with an added complement of cadets to make up the under-strength crew.

In August 1939 the Ramillies was sent on exercises in the North Sea, and ordered into Scapa Flow. Aware from his first World War experiences of the vulnerabilities of the Scapa Flow anchorage to submarines, Baillie Grohman was appalled by the inadequate state of the antisubmarine defences, which he discovered to be due to underfunding from the Admiralty. Finding himself the senior office in Scapa Flow, he immediately ordered further measures to be undertaken to force the Admiralty's hand, before the Ramillies was despatched to Portland in September 1939 to commence convoy duties. In December 1939, the 18 year old Prince Philip was given his first service appointment as a midshipman aboard the Ramillies under Baillie Grohman's command.

=== Second World War ===
On the Outbreak of war the Ramillies was ordered to Gibraltar and undertook convoy escort duty to Australia and New Zealand, under Baillie Grohman's command until October 1940 when Baillie Grohman was recalled to the UK and promoted to Admiral in January 1941.

Posed to Alexandria, In April 1941, Baillie-Grohman organised Operation Demon, the successful naval evacuation from Greece under difficult circumstances of the British and Commonwealth forces after the rapid German invasion, and "the outstanding achievement of his career", for which he was appointed a Companion of the Order of the Bath. He later coauthored a book on the operation with Anthony Heckenstall-Smith.

He was appointed Rear Admiral Combined Operations in 1942, but had to relinquish the appointment due to illness. A fluent German speaker, Baillie Grohman was appointed Flag Officer Schleswig Holstein as part of Operation Eclipse the operation to disarm and disband the German Navy at the end of World War II; an experience he described in the third volume of his memoirs. On 8 May 1945, Baillie-Grohman hoisted the White Ensign over the German naval headquarters at Kiel.

In addition to his British decorations, Baillie-Grohman also received the Belgian Order of Leopold, as well as to the Order of the Star of Ethiopia and the Chinese Order of Brilliant Jade. There is a portrait photo of him in the National Portrait Gallery London and his papers are lodged with the Imperial War Museum, London.

== Family ==
Baillie Grohman was the eldest son of William Baillie Grohman and Florence née Nickalls of Schloss Matzen in the Austrian Tyrol, from whom he inherited the castle. He married Evelyn Taylor [1890-1982] on 11 September 1915 and had two sons, Tom Peter Baillie Grohman [1916-1991], OBE, DSC and Michael Arthur Baillie Grohman[1919-1978], DSC, both of whom served with distinction in the Royal Navy in the second world war.

His younger sister, Olga Florence Baillie Grohman (1889–1947), who married Oscar Ferris Watkins, became a pioneer in Kenya and the first female Member of the Kenya Legislative Council (MLC).
