= Elizabeth Watkins =

- Born: 24 June 1923; Hawkhurst, Kent, United Kingdom
- Died: 14 October 2012 (aged 89); Oxford, United Kingdom
- Occupation: Writer
- Website: www.elizabethwatkinskenyabooks.co.uk

June Knowles (24 June 1923 – 14 October 2012), better known by her pen name Elizabeth Watkins, was an English author, brought up in Kenya, where her parents - Oscar Ferris Watkins (1877–1943) and Olga Florence Watkins (née Baillie Grohman) (1889–1947) - had started a coffee farm outside Nairobi, and later educated at St Anne's College, Oxford.

In 1941, aged just 18, she falsified her age in order to join up with the Women's Auxiliary Air Force as a cypher officer. Serving in Cairo at the height of the Eighth Army's North African Campaign, she worked at the Heliopolis signals base and other secret locations translating top secret signals for the British High Command, including relaying intercepted German Ultra traffic, intelligence considered so secret that it was not even shared directly with the other Allies of World War II. Later posted to Kenya to be with her dying father, she was then sent to the Seychelles, where she supported the dangerous work of the Catalina crews of the Canadian and allied air forces, flying vital anti-submarine missions to protect the sea routes to India. Subsequently, volunteering for further active service she was posted to Caserta to do cyphers for the Allied advance into Southern Italy.

In 1949 she married Oliver Staniforth Knowles (1920–2008) in Nairobi, they had met at Oxford University and moved to Kenya where he was in the Colonial Administration. They had four sons.

Watkins died on October 14, 2012, at the age of 89 at her home in Oxford, after a short illness.

== Books ==
- Jomo's Jailor - Grand Warrior of Kenya. with a foreword by Elspeth Huxley. Watlington: Mulberry Books. 1993. ISBN 978-0-9528952-0-6.

A Biography of 'Wouse' (Leslie Whitehouse) a colonial administrator and the District Commissioner in Turkana, Kenya in the mid-1950s at the time Jomo Kenyatta was interned by the British in Lokitaung and then Lodwar. Responsible for holding him safely in captivity, Whitehouse formed a friendship with Kenyatta which subsequently influenced Kenyatta's outlook and relationship with white Kenyans.

- Oscar from Africa - The Biography of Oscar Ferris Watkins 1877-1943. London: Radcliff press. 1995. ISBN 1-85043-948-6.

The Biography of her father Oscar Ferris Watkins, Colonial Administrator and Commandant of the 400,000 – strong Carrier Corps in the East African campaign in the First World War;

- Olga in Kenya - Repressing the Irrepressible. London: Pen Press. 2005. ISBN 1-905203-74-8.

The biography of her mother, Olga Florence Watkins, daughter of William Adolf Baillie Grohman, a former British debutante from an Anglo-Austrian family who went out to Kenya in 1914 to farm. Widowed at 25 when her husband, Douglas Thompson, was killed in the battle of Kisumu, she was recruited for her fluent German by the nefarious Richard Meinertzhagen to help in intelligence work. An energetic pioneer, farmer and social worker, she became the first woman member of the Nairobi City council, and a member of the Kenya Legislative Council, being elected to take the seat previously held by the murdered Lord Erroll. As the first director of Women's Education in Kenya she was a staunch advocate of rights and education facilities for African woman.

== Autobiographical ==
- Cypher Officer - in Cairo, Kenya, Caserta (2008) Pen Press ISBN 978-1-906206-27-7.

A first hand account of the author's own experiences in the Second World War as an RAF Cypher officer in the WAAFs, encoding and decoding cyphers in the field, by using the British version of the Enigma machine.

== See also ==
- Carrier Corps
- Jomo Kenyatta
- History of Kenya
- Richard Meinertzhagen
- William Adolf Baillie Grohman - grandfather
- Emily Quihampton - great grandmother
- Oscar Ferris Watkins - father
