= Gropman =

Gropman is surname. Notable people with the surname include:

- Alan L. Gropman (born 1938), American military officer, college professor, and author
- Andrea Gropman, American pediatric neurologist

== See also ==
- Grohman (disambiguation)
- Groopman
