= Grohman =

Grohman and Grohmann are surnames, and may refer to:

== People ==
- Claudia Grohmann (born 2002), "Queen of Germany" (see Miss Germany)
- Henryk Grohman (1862–1939), Polish industrialist
- Jorge Basadre Grohmann (1903–1980), Peruvian historian
- Kleanthes K. Grohmann (born June 5, 1972), German linguist, academic, and author
- Patricia Grohmann (born 1990), German volleyballer
- Paul Grohmann (1848–1908), Austrian mountaineer
- Tim Grohmann (born 1988), German rower
- Will Grohmann (1887–1968), German art critic
- William Adolf Baillie Grohman (1851–1921), an author and pioneer in British Columbia

== Other uses ==
- Grohman Narrows Provincial Park, a provincial park in British Columbia, Canada
- Grohmann Knives, a Canadian knife company; see Zytel
- Grohmann Museum, Milwaukee, Wisconsin, United States
- Jorge Basadre Grohmann National University, Tacna, Peru
- Tesla Grohmann Automation GmbH, German engineering company

== See also ==
- Grohmannspitze (Grohmann Peak) a mountain in Italy
- Baillie-Grohman Canal, a canal in British Columbia, Canada
