= Patteson Nickalls (stockbroker) =

British stockbroker and Liberal politician

Sir Patteson Nickalls JP (10 December 1836 – 4 October 1910) was a British stockbroker and Liberal politician and was president of the Polo and Riding Pony Society.

== Biography ==
Nickalls was born in Chicago in 1836 as a British subject, the son of Patteson Nickalls (1798–1869) and Arabella Chalk (1799–1893). He was the younger brother of Tom Nickalls. He became a stockbroker in London. At the 1885 general election he stood unsuccessfully for parliament as a Liberal at Sevenoaks. He was knighted at Osborne House on 11 August 1893. At the 1900 general election he stood unsuccessfully for parliament as a Liberal at Dartford. In 1901, he addressed a pro-Boer meeting at Maidstone which was broken up by his opponents, and which caused unpopularity for Nickalls at the Stock Exchange.

Nickalls lived at Chislehurst and died in 1910 at the age of 73.

== Family ==
Nickalls married Florence Womersley (1847–1896) in London in 1867. They had five daughters and Four sons:

- Ethel Patteson Nickalls (1867–1948)
- Howard Hampden Nickalls (1868-1869) Baptised as Hampden Nickalls
- Winifred Nickalls, who married Major-General Charles Budworth (1869−1921)
- Hylda Patteson Nickalls (1871–1947)
- Lilian Patteson Nickalls (1873–1950), who married in 1902 Captain William Randal Ponsonby (1876–1919), and later Major Arthur Trevor-Boothe (1869–1946)
- Sybil Patteson Nickalls (1874–1938), who married Hon Henry Gilbert Lakin (1875–1964)
- Major Patteson Womersley Nickalls (1877–1946)
- Colonel Cecil Patteson Nickalls (1877–1925)
- Morres Nickalls (1879-1952)

The sons were all leading polo players who were educated at Rugby School and New College, Oxford and played polo for Oxford University.
