= William Baillie Grohman =

Anglo-Austrian author & big game hunter (1851-1921)

William Adolph Baillie Grohman
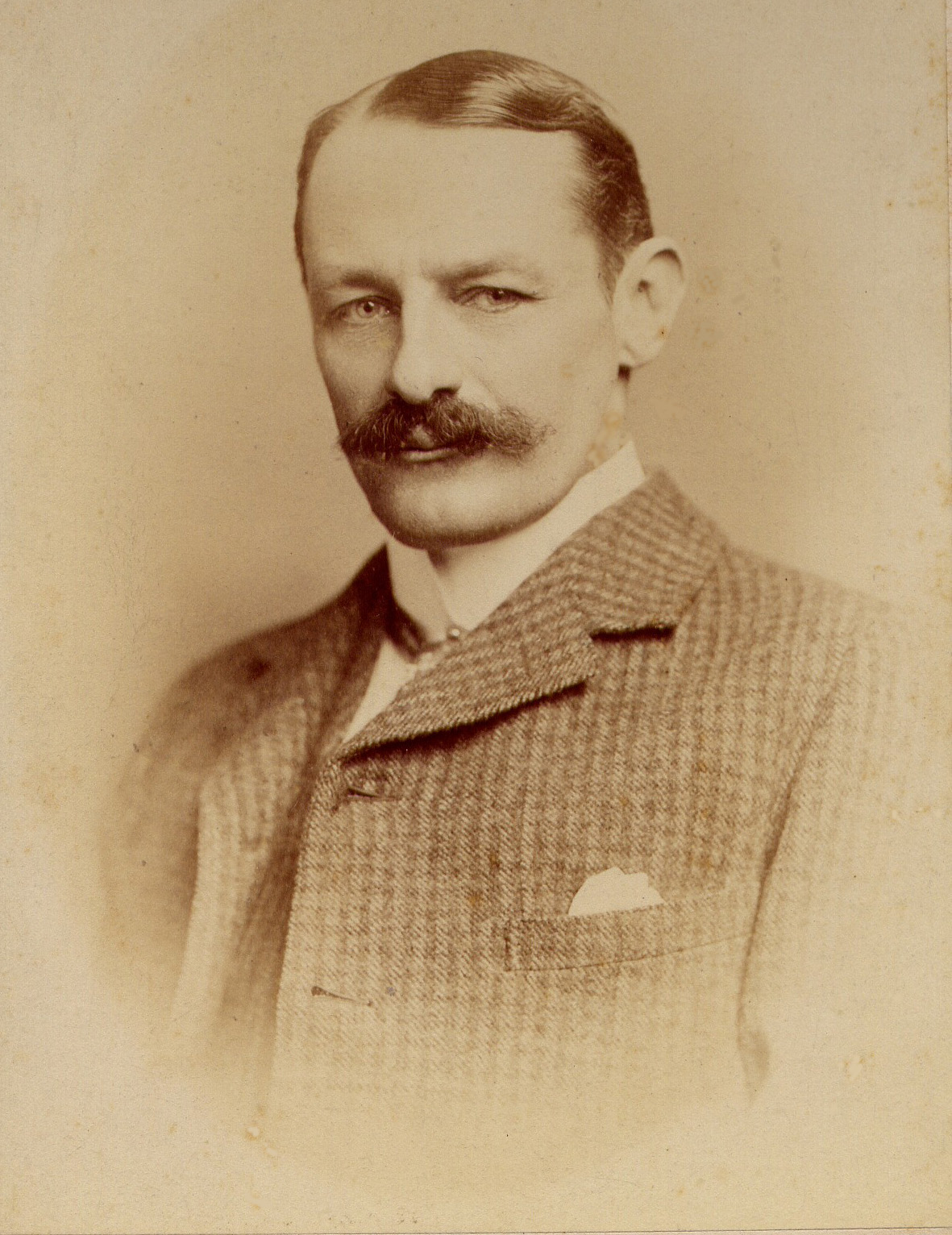
- Baillie-Grohman in 1885
- Born: April 1, 1851; Gmunden, Upper Austria
- Died: February 11, 1921 (aged 69); Schloss Matzen, Austria
- Education: Elizabeth College, Guernsey
- Occupations: Author, big-game hunter
- Spouse: Florence Nickalls (m. 1885)
- Children: 2
- Parents: Adolf Rheinhold Grohmann (father); Francis Margaret 'Fanny' Reade (mother)
- Relatives: Admiral Harold Baillie-Grohman (son)

William Adolph Baillie Grohman (April 1, 1851 – February 11, 1921) was an Anglo-Austrian author of works on the Tyrol and the history of hunting, a big game sportsman, and a pioneer in the Kootenay region of British Columbia.

== Biography ==
=== Early life ===
Grohmann was born in 1851 in Gmunden, the eldest son of Adolf Rheinhold Grohmann (1822–1877) and Francis Margaret 'Fanny' Reade (1831–1908). He spent much of his youth in Tyrol in Austria, and could speak the Tyrolese dialect like a native. His early years were spent at the Schloss von St. Wolfgang in the Salzkammergut, which had a famous garden. His father had mental breakdown and in 1861 had to be committed to an asylum. He was educated by private tutors and at Elizabeth College, Guernsey. In 1873 his mother bought the semi-derelict Schloss Matzen in the Tyrol, near the branch of the Zillertal and the Inn Valley. As a young man Grohmann roamed out from the family castle to hunt chamois and deer in the surrounding high alps, wandering for days through the still-remote Tyrolese mountain villages. His two earliest books, Tyrol & the Tyrolese (1876) and Gaddings with a Primitive People (1878), provide a rare first-hand insight into Tyrolese folk customs and the austere, isolated existence of pre-industrial Alpine village communities.

He was an expert mountaineer and made the first winter ascent of the Großglockner, the highest mountain in Austria (3798m), on 2 January 1875, and was a member of the Alpine Club. He is credited as being one of the first to introduce skis to the Tyrol, having been sent four pairs by his father in law, the railway magnate Tom Nickalls, who had a hunting lodge in Norway – he started using them in 1893, as is related in an article in The Field in 1937, by his daughter Olga, who herself became an early member of the Innsbruck ski club. The article in The Field includes photographs of Baillie Grohman's wife Florence on skis in 1894 – the earliest known photograph of a woman on skis in the Alps. Skis were also introduced to the Tyrol the same year at Kitzbühel by Franz Reisch.

=== Travels in North America ===
A skilled marksman shot and a passionate big-game hunter, he travelled out to the American West many times throughout the 1870s and 1880s to shoot big game when the Rockies and mountain states were opening up to sportsmen. His book Camps in the Rockies (1882) gives an account of his travels through Wyoming and Idaho, both as a "topshelfer" (a rich comfort-laden sportsman) and later on – more to his boyhood taste of stalking with Tyrolean mountain huntsmen – roughing it with trappers and Native Americans. Although written in a style of detached amusement to entertain Victorian readers, this work, like his earlier books about the Tyrolese, has careful and sympathetic passages on Native American customs, and gives a valuable first-hand account of the American and Canadian West just before and after the arrival of the railway. He ranged widely over the Pacific Slope and the Central Rockies and explored unclimbed peaks in the Selkirks.

Baillie Grohman liked the new country he found so much that he returned to British Columbia in the 1880s as a pioneer, investing through the Kootenay Company Ltd, a London registered company which obtained a concession of 78,525 acres (317.78 km^{2}) to develop the Upper and Lower Kootenay valleys. The company was capitalised at £100,000.00 in 20,000 shares of £5 each (roughly $1,000,000 at the time), mostly raised in Ottawa. He wrote a number of articles for British magazines promoting the possibilities of British Columbia. In his youth he had seen how the embankment of the Inn River in the lower Inntal had turned unproductive flood land into profitable farmland and so envisaged that a similar control of the Kootenay River and a lowering of the water levels of the Kootenay Lake would create large areas of fertile farmland. This plan was thwarted by political pressure from the Canadian Pacific Railway and others, who managed ultimately to get the concession revoked and awarded to rival interests. Probably his restless and outspoken temperament and privileged background was not well suited to the political manoeuvring needed to mollify the Provincial Colonial Administration and counter the machinations of the Railway and other interests.

Before the concession was revoked, the Kootenay Company was held to one of the conditions of its grant – that it must build a canal to connect the Columbia River and Kootenay. The canal took a massive investment and, because of the railway, was pointless (only two ships ever used it) and the project failed. It is now a historic site at Canal Flats, British Columbia.

Between 1883 and 1885 Grohman lived some time in Victoria, British Columbia, negotiating the concession with the government of British Columbia, and then moved to Kootenay to manage the project, opening the first steam sawmill in the region and the first steamboat on Lake Kootenay. He was the first Justice of the Peace and the first postmaster in Kootenay. His account of his time in British Columbia, Fifteen Years' Sport and Life in the Hunting Grounds of Western America and British Columbia, describes some of his pioneering experiences, and also has accounts of hunting the rare white Rocky Mountain "antelope goat", sometimes known then as "Haplocerus Montanus" but now assigned the Linnaean name of Oreamnos americanus, as well as the pursuit of many other types of game. Baillie Grohman's scheme for reclamation was later successfully implemented by others.

=== Later life ===
His later books include successful works on the history of the Tyrol (by then an increasingly popular destination for English tourists), Tyrol, The Land in the Mountains (1907) and Tyrol (1908), as well as a guidebook to his own castle, published in German, Schloß Matzen im Unterinntal (1907).

A passionate collector, he amassed a large collection of antique European furniture and of European sporting art (his collection of sporting prints was sold at a special sale at Sotheby's in 1923). In his later years he developed an interest in the history and art of sport, building up an extensive library on hunting and game animals, including early ecological studies along with early treatises on hunting in many different European languages. Assisted by his wife, Florence, he produced a lavishly illustrated and authoritative edition of The Master of Game (1904), the second oldest English book on hunting, a translation (from the French Livre de Chasse (1387) of Gaston Phébus) by Edward of Norwich, 2nd Duke of York. This has a foreword by his friend and later US president Teddy Roosevelt, also an avid big game hunter, who visited him in the Tyrol.

In his book on early depictions of hunting Sport in art, An iconography of sport (1913), Baillie Grohman was able to bring together a lifetime's understanding of hunting in the field with an extensive historical knowledge of early sporting art gained through his own collecting and research. Baillie Grohman's own collection included 56 drawings by the celebrated Flemish artist Johannes Stradanus, including the famous 'Allegory of America' now in the Metropolitan Museum of Art, New York. An edition of Maximilian I's Das Jagdbuch Kaiser Maximillians I (1901) with Dr Michael Mayr is also of interest as an early exploration of game ecology.

As well as writing 11 books, he published numerous articles in contemporary British magazines on both historical and travel subjects.

His interest in wildlife and the depiction of animals in historic art was sufficient to merit an obituary in the scientific journal Nature that noted: "A man of striking physique, endowed with high courage and great mind, he possessed an intense affection for the wild and grand in Nature, coupled, remarkably enough, with an unflagging interest in much that is purely scholarly."

On the outbreak of the World War I, as British nationals, the Baillie Grohman's faced internment but were allowed to leave Austria after the intercession of Prince Auersperg. They returned after the war and started the Tyrolean Relief Fund to help Tyroleans through the famine in the Tyrol that followed the war. He died in 1921 in Schloss Matzen.

== Family ==
In 1885 Baillie Grohman married Florence née Nickalls, daughter of Tom Nickalls (1828–1899) and Emily née Quihampton (1834–1909). Nickalls was a London stockbroker known as the "Erie King" from his many coups in American railway shares. The champion rowers Guy Nickalls and Vivian Nickalls were Florence's brothers. Florence joined William pioneering in British Columbia and wrote about her experiences in an appendix to her husband's account.

Florence and William had a son and a daughter: their son, Vice-Admiral Harold Tom Baillie Grohman RN CB DSO OBE (1887–1978), had a distinguished career in the Royal Navy, commanding the battleship HMS Ramillies at the start of the Second World War; and their daughter, Olga Florence Baillie Grohman (1889–1947), who married secondly Oscar Ferris Watkins, became a pioneer in Kenya and the first female Member of the Legislative Council of Kenya (MLC).

== Legacy ==
Mount Grohman (2299 m) near Nelson, British Columbia is named after him as is the Grohman Narrows Provincial Park.

== Bibliography ==
=== Books Authored by W A Baillie Grohman ===
- Tyrol & the Tyrolese: The people & the Land in their social, sporting and mountaineering aspects. London: Longmans, Green & Co. 1876. [1st Ed, 8vo 278p]
  - Tyrol & the Tyrolese: The people & the Land in their social, sporting and mountaineering aspects. London: Longmans, Green & Co. 1877. [2nd Ed, 8vo 278p]
  - Tyrol & the Tyrolese: The people & the Land in their social, sporting and mountaineering aspects. Collection of British authors: Tauchnitz edition; v. 1685. Leipzig: Tauchnitz. 1877. [1st Ed, 278p. 16 cm]
  - Tyrol & the Tyrolese: The people & the Land in their social, sporting and mountaineering aspects. New York: Elibron Classics. 2010. [reprint, Paperback]
- Gaddings with a Primitive People: Being a series of Sketches of Alpine Life and Customs. London: Remington and Co. 1878. [1st UK Ed, 8vo 2 vols pp279]
  - Gaddings with a Primitive People: Being a series of Sketches of Alpine Life and Customs. Leisure hour series. No. 98. New York: Henry Holt and Company. 1878. [1st US Ed, 8vo pp397]
  - Gaddings with a Primitive People: Being a series of Sketches of Alpine Life and Customs. London: Remington and Co. 1879. [2nd UK Ed, 8vo 2 vols pp279]
- Camps in the Rockies: Being a Narrative of Life on the Frontier, and Sport in the Rocky Mountains, with an Account of the Cattle Ranches of the West. London: Samson, Low, Marston, Searle & Rivington. 1882. [1st UK Ed, 8vo, 438pp., 4 illus (2 in color)]
  - Camps in the Rockies: Being a Narrative of Life on the Frontier, and Sport in the Rocky Mountains, with an Account of the Cattle Ranches of the West. New York: Charles Scribner & Son. 1882. [1st US Ed, 8vo, 438pp., 4 illus (2 in color)]
  - Camps in the Rockies: Being a Narrative of Life on the Frontier, and Sport in the Rocky Mountains, with an Account of the Cattle Ranches of the West. New York: Charles Scribner & Son. 1884. [2nd US Ed, 8vo, 438pp., 4 illus (2 in color)]
  - Camps in the Rockies: Being a Narrative of Life on the Frontier, and Sport in the Rocky Mountains, with an Account of the Cattle Ranches of the West. CIHM/ICMH Microfiche series = CIHM/ICMH collection de microfiches; no. 03971. London: Samson, Low, Marston, Searle & Rivington. 1882. ISBN 9780665039713. [3rd UK Ed, 8vo, 438pp., 4 illus (2 in color)]
  - Camps in the Rockies: Being a Narrative of Life on the Frontier, and Sport in the Rocky Mountains, with an Account of the Cattle Ranches of the West. New Edition. New York: Charles Scribner's Sons. 1898. [3rd US Ed, 8vo, 438pp., 4 illus (2 in color)]
  - Camps in the Rockies: Being a Narrative of Life on the Frontier, and Sport in the Rocky Mountains, with an Account of the Cattle Ranches of the West. New York: Charles Scribner & Son. 1910. [4th US Ed, 8vo, 438pp., 4 illus (2 in color)]
- Sport in the Alps in the past and present: An account of the chase of the chamois, red-deer, bouquetin, roe-deer, capercaillie, and black-cock, with personal adventures and historical notes. London: Adam & Charles Black. 1896. [xv, 356p, 2pp]
  - Sport in the Alps in the past and present: An account of the chase of the chamois, red-deer, bouquetin, roe-deer, capercaillie, and black-cock, with personal adventures and historical notes. New York: Charles Scribner & Sons. 1896. [xv, 356p, 2pp]
- Schloß Matzen im Unterinntal: Kurze geschichtlich (in German). Innsbruck: Wagner'sche Universitäts Buchhandlung. 1907a. [1st Auflage. 60pp, mit 34 Abbildunge]
  - Schloß Matzen im Unterinntal: Kurze geschichtlich (in German). Innsbruck: Wagner'sche Universitäts Buchhandlung. 1907. [2nd Auflage. 60pp, mit 34 Abbildunge]
- Tyrol, The Land in the Mountains. London: Simpkin, Marshal, Hamilton Kent & Co. 1907b. [1st UK. 288pp 82 plates 23 cm] Review
  - Tyrol, The Land in the Mountains. Philadelphia: J.B. Lippincott & Co. 1907. [1st US. 288pp 82 plates 23 cm]
- Baillie Grohman, William Adolf (1908). Tyrol. Painted by E. Harrison Compton. London: Adam and Charles Black. [1st UK. Folio, 302pp. 52 pl]
- Sport in Art: An iconography of sport. Illustrating the field sports of Europe and America from the Fifteenth to the Eighteenth Century. London: Ballantyne. 1913. [1st Ed. Quarto 422pp., 8p]
  - Sport in Art: An iconography of sport. Illustrating the field sports of Europe and America from the Fifteenth to the Eighteenth Century. London: Simkin, Marshal, Hamilton, Kent & Co. 1919. [2nd Ed. Quarto 422pp., 8p]
  - Sport in Art: An iconography of sport. Illustrating the field sports of Europe and America from the Fifteenth to the Eighteenth Century. New York: Benjamin Blom. 1969. [Reprint. Quarto]
  - Sport in Art: An iconography of sport. Illustrating the field sports of Europe and America from the Fifteenth to the Eighteenth Century. New York: Benjamin Blom. 1990. [Reprint. Quarto]
- Baillie Grohman, William Adolf; Mayr, Dr Michael (1901). Das Jagdbuch Kaiser Maximillians I: mit drei färbigten Reproduktionen gleichzeitiger Bilder und drei Lichtdrucktafeln [1st Auflage. xxxii, 191 p., [6] plates: ill.; 34 cm. ] (in German). Innsbruck: Wagner'sche Universitäts Buchhandlung.

=== Books by W A Baillie Grohman and Florence Baillie Grohman ===
- Fifteen Years' Sport and Life in the Hunting Grounds of Western America and British Columbia. CIHM/ICMH Microfiche series = CIHM/ICMH collection de microfiches; no. 14074. London: Horace Cox. 1900a. ISBN 9780665140747. [1st UK ed. Quarto p. xii, 403, with 3 maps in e/p pocket and 77 illus.]
  - Fifteen Years' Sport and Life in the Hunting Grounds of Western America and British Columbia. London: Horace Cox. 1900. doi:10.14288/1.0348616. [1st Us ed. Quarto p. xii, 403, with 3 maps in e/p pocket and 77 illus. Green cloth, lettered in gilt, top edge gilt]
  - Fifteen Years' Sport and Life in the Hunting Grounds of Western America and British Columbia. London: Horace Cox. 1907. [2nd UK ed. Quarto p. xii, 403, with 3 maps in e/p pocket and 77 illus.]
- The Master of Game by Edward, second Duke of York: the oldest English book on hunting. With a foreword by Teddy Roosevelt. London: Ballantine, Hanson & Co. 1904. [1st Ed. 8vo. 208pp. 25 pl]
  - The Master of Game by Edward, second Duke of York: the oldest English book on hunting. With a foreword by Teddy Roosevelt. London: Chatto & Windus. 1909. [2nd Prtg. 8vo. 208pp. 25 pl]
  - The Master of Game by Edward, second Duke of York: the oldest English book on hunting. With a foreword by Teddy Roosevelt. New York: Duffield. 1909. [1st US 302 p.: ill.; 21 cm]
  - The Master of Game by Edward, second Duke of York: the oldest English book on hunting. With a foreword by Teddy Roosevelt. London: Chatto & Windus. 1919. [2nd xxix, 302 p.: ill.; 21 cm. ]
  - The Master of Game by Edward, second Duke of York: the oldest English book on hunting. With a foreword by Teddy Roosevelt. London: AMS Press. 1974. [Reprint xxix, 302 p.: ill.; 21 cm.]

=== Articles by W A Baillie Grohman ===
- Baillie-Grohmann, W.A. (1875a). "The Golden eagle and its eyrie". Alpine Journal. Vii: 92.
- Baillie-Grohmann, W.A. (1875b). "Ascent of the Gross Glockner". Alpine Journal. VII: 222.
- Baillie Grohman, William Adolf (1884). "Hunting The Rocky Mountain Goat". The Century. Vol. 29, no. 2 December. London.
- Baillie Grohman, William Adolf; Barneby, W.H. (1884). "The Kootenay Lake District (Appendix C)". Life And Labour in the Far, Far West Being Notes of a Tour in the Western States, British Columbia, Manitoba, And The North-West Territory [2nd Edition]. London, Paris & New York: Cassell & Company. pp. 397–424.
- Baillie Grohman, William Adolf (1884). Letter to the Honorable the Chief Commissioner of Lands and Works, Victoria, B.C., from Wm. A. Baillie-Grohman [3pp] (Report). Victoria, B.C: Government of British Columbia.
- Baillie Grohman, William Adolf (1886). Report on the Government Concessions for 78,525 Acres of selected Land in the Kootenay valleys in Kootenay district, British Columbia (Report). London: Kootenay Syndicate Ltd.
- Baillie Grohman, William Adolf (1887). "Home-hunting in the Kootenay valleys of British Columbia". The Illustrated London News. Vol. March 5th. London. p. 265.
- Baillie Grohman, William Adolf (1889). "Seven years' pathfinding in the Selkirks of Kootenay". The Field. Vol. May 11. London. pp. 657–658.
- Baillie Grohman, William Adolf (1895). "Stalking the haplocerus in the Selkirks [11pp]". The English illustrated magazine. No. 140 (May). London. pp. 127–133.
- Baillie Grohman, William Adolf (1897). "Sports in the Seventeenth Century. [11pp]". The Century. Vol. 54, issue 3 (July 1897).
- Baillie Grohman, William Adolf (1900). The New South Africa. London: C.Arthur Pearson. pp. 1–16.
- Baillie Grohman, William Adolf (1901). "Capercaillie-Shooting in the Alps The Secrets of a Fascinating Sport. [7p]". Pall Mall Magazine. London.
- Baillie Grohman, William Adolf (1901). "Austria, by W.A. Baillie-Grohman". In Aflalo, Frederick George (ed.). Sport in Europe. Illustrated from drawings ... and from photographs.[A series of articles by various writers.] London: Sands & Co. pp. 17–44.
- Baillie Grohman, William Adolf (1902). "A famous mediaeval hunting-book". Monthly Review. No. January. London.
- Baillie Grohman, William Adolf (1903). "Ancient Weapons of the Chase. Article I". The Burlington Magazine for Connoisseurs. Vol. 3, no. 8. London.
- Baillie Grohman, William Adolf (1903). "The Finest hunting-manuscript extant [i.e. the Gaston Phoebus MS.]". Burlington Magazine. Vol. 2. London. pp. 8–21.
- Baillie Grohman, William Adolf (1904). "Ancient Weapons of the Chase. Article II". The Burlington Magazine for Connoisseurs. Vol. 4, no. 11. London.
- Baillie Grohman, William Adolf (1909). "Some historical portraits of the Biedermaier Period of German Art". Burlington Magazine. London. pp. 114–119.
- Baillie Grohman, William Adolf (n.d.). "How to reach Klondike. by one who has been fifteen times to the Pacific slope". The New Illustrated Magazine. London.
- Baillie Grohman, William Adolf (1894). "The Chamois". Big Game Shooting. Vol. 2. London: Longmans Green and Co. pp. 85–122.
- Baillie Grohman, William Adolf (1894). "The Stag of the Alps". In Phillipps-Wolley, Clive (ed.). Big Game Shooting '. Vol. 2. London: Longmans Green and Co. pp. 123–134.
- Baillie Grohman, William Adolf (1918). "The Kootenay Country". The Geographical Journal. No. July 1918. Royal Geographical Society.
- Baillie Grohman, William Adolf (1918). "A Paradise for Canadian & American Soldiers". The Nineteenth Century and After. Vol. 83, no. April 1918. pp. 762–778.
- Baillie Grohman, William Adolf (1919). "A Work by Veit Stoss". The Burlington Magazine for Connoisseurs. Vol. 35, no. 199. London.
- Baillie Grohman, William Adolf (1921). "A Portrait of the Ugliest Princess in History". The Burlington Magazine for Connoisseurs. Vol. 38, no. 217. London.
- Baillie Grohman, William Adolf (1990). Elk Hunting Tales An Anthology of Historic Outdoor Adventures from the Pages of BUGLE Magazine. London, Paris & New York: Rocky Mountain Elk Foundation. ISBN 978-0-9627248-2-4.

== See also ==
- Grohman Narrows Provincial Park, British Columbia
- Schloss Matzen, Tyrol
- Elizabeth Watkins
