= HMS Aldborough =

HMS Aldborough is the name of several Royal Navy vessels:

- HMS Aldborough (1691), a ketch launched 1691, accidentally blown up 1696
- HMS Aldborough (1706), a sixth rate launched 1706, broken up 1727
- HMS Aldborough (1727), a sixth rate launched in 1727, broken up 1742
- HMS Aldborough (1743), a sixth rate launched 1743, sold 1749
- HMS Aldborough (1756), a sixth rate launched 1756, broken up 1777
- HMS Aldborough, a Hunt-class minesweeper renamed HMS Leamington
