= HMS Totnes =

Minesweeper of the Royal Navy

History

United Kingdom
- Name: Totnes
- Ordered: January 1916
- Builder: Archibald McMillan & Son
- Launched: 17 August 1918
- Fate: Sold May 1922

General characteristics
- Class & type: Ascot-class paddle minesweeper

HMS Totnes was an Ascot-class paddle minesweeper built for the Royal Navy during World War I and used in minesweeping operations off Scapa Flow.

== Design and description ==
The Ascot-class paddle minesweepers were inspired by the hired paddle sweepers that had performed well early in the war, following Ailsa Shipbuilding Company's successful design for Glen Usk.

== Construction and career ==
HMS Totnes was built by the Archibald McMillan & Son. She was launched on 17 May August 1916. In 1916 her bow was blown off by a naval mine. Between 1916 and 1918 she served in the Minesweeper Flotilla protecting the Grand Fleet at Scapa Flow under Commander (later Admiral) Tom Baillie-Grohman.

Totnes was sold in March 1922.
