= Groopman =

Groopman is a surname. Notable people with the surname include:

- Jerome Groopman, American physician and writer
- John Groopman, American cancer researcher

== See also ==
- Gropman
