= Schloss Matzen =

Castle in Tyrol, Austria

Coordinates: 47.422352°N 11.864988°E

- Tyrol, Austria
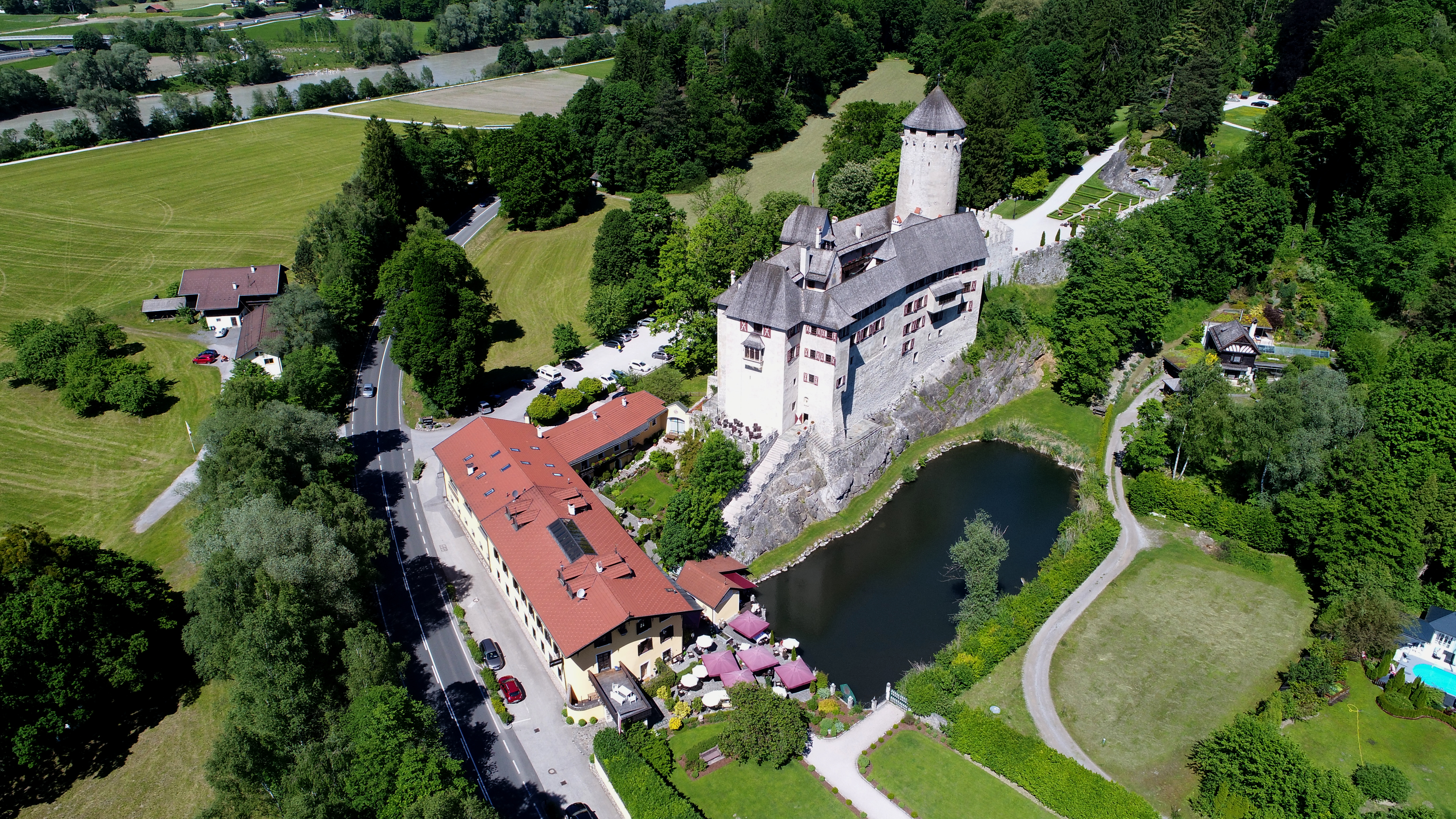
- Aerial view in 2017

Site information
- Type: Massive central block around central courtyard with a separate round lookout tower
- Owner: Rueter Family
- Controlled by: Rueter Family
- Open to the public: Limited
- Condition: Intact, used as a hotel

Site history
- Materials: local stone, wood shingle roof
- Events: War of the Spanish Succession

Schloss Matzen is a historic Austrian castle, located in the Tyrol near the branch of the Ziller Valley from the main Inn valley. Strategically located to control one of the major transalpine trade routes, the origins of the castle date from Roman times and it has a distinctive round tower thought to be of possible Roman derivation. The castle, mostly Gothic in origin is one of the most important surviving historic buildings of the Tyrol.

== History ==
The site of the castle appears on Roman maps of the Antonine Itinerary as Masciacum, a staging post on the major Roman military road between the provinces of Raetia and Noricum. Roman weapons, jewelry, pottery, a fragment of a mosaic and a Roman milestone have been found in its vicinity. The castle stands near two other castles Schloss Lichtwerth (600m) and Schloss Kropfsberg (2000m), reflecting the key strategic importance of the location at the cross-roads of two major valleys offering passage through the Alps. The current edifice dates mostly from the early middle ages, with many later additions.

=== Early history ===
In feudal times the castle was the local seat of power, and magistrate's seat. It has a long and complex history of ownership, with no family after the Knights of Frundsberg retaining it for more than 150 years or so. Its Feudal tributaries included the Brandenberg valley. However Matzen was always an Allodial title or freehold property and at no time a temporal or church fief, so it does not appear in records of land tenure.

The first mention of the castle in medieval times is in 1167 in the Salzburg domesday in which "Ulricus de Vriunsperch von der Matzen" and his wife Elsbeth von Walchen renounce their rights to a property called Waidring (near Kitzbuhl) in favour of the Archbishop of Salzburg - indicating that it was by this time in the possession of the Knights of Frundsberg, a powerful family one of whom George von Frundsberg founded the Landsknechte, modern Europe's first standing infantry army. The Frundberg ancestral home was at Schwaz, some 11 miles distant. At this time a large part of the lower Inn valley was in the fief of the See of Brixen.

A copy of an older medieval document in the chapel indicates that the original chapel was consecrated on 23 November 1176 by Archbishop Conrad of Wittelsbach, a member of the royal house of Bavaria.

A deed of 1263 records a visit by Meinhard of Tyrol, the then sovereign, to Matzen (Acta sunt nec (sic) Burgo Matcii) in which a Rupert von Matzen is one of the witnesses for an act confirming gifts to the monastery of St Benedict in Bavaria. A document by Martin Bitschnau in 1282 in the Fiecht/St. Georgenberg archives mentions "Grifo, miles de Matzen". Grifo von Sonnenburg was a knight in the service of the Lord of Frundsberg at Schwaz.

In the summer 1410 the castle under the command of Ulrich von Frundsberg was besieged by the forces of Duke Freidrich of Bavaria. Remnants of the siege, including stone balls were found during excavations of the garden entrance in 1900.

The nearby Reith Parish church registers record successive guardians of the castle; in 1428 Hans Grysinger, in 1421 Gastl Gesind and in 1451 Eckhart Gesinden.

In 1468 Matthias Türndl bought the castle and undertook an expansion of the castle in the Gothic style. His son George succeeded him In 1492 Anton von Ross bought the castle. On the marriage of his daughter Anna with Sigmund von Frauenberg, the castle formed a valuable part of her dowry. Von Frauenberg was a supporter of Herzog George von Bayern-Landshut against Kaiser Maximilian I and in retaliation Maxmillian sequestered the castle and placed it under the control of Veit Jakob Taenzl. Sigmund died in 1523 and his son Anton sold the castle to Sigmund Fueger, a rich tradesman. who undertook a major reconstruction of the castle and also acquired the Matzener Crucifix, an important work of early German woodcarving, previously attributed to Veit Stoss. The distinctive galleried arcading around the central courtyard dates from this period. The castle then came into the possession of the immensely wealthy Fugger family who remodelled it as a residential palace.

Matthias Pock, who held Matzen from 1658 to 1684, rebuilt the Gothic chapel adding a Baroque altarpiece.

Around 1684 Johann Ferdinand Yrsch bought the castle. In 1703 during the war of the Spanish Succession it was looted. The entire roof timbers and fifty windows date from this period, suggesting replacement after burning.

The Freiherr von Yrsch sold the castle in 1734 to Josef Rupert von Pfeiffersberg, in whose family the castle remained for the next 140 years suffering increasing neglect. The Pfeiffersbergs were mostly absentee landlords living in Vienna and neglected the property which suffered several fires. Eventually the roof fell in and by the end of their occupation the upper part of the castle was uninhabitable and the last von Pfeiffersberg Ritter, Joseph, lived in a few ramshackle rooms in the lower "Gut Matzen" area.

=== Later history ===
In September 1873 the castle was sold by Josef von Pfeiffersbergs to Frances Margaret ("Fanny") Grohman (1831-1908), daughter of Captain James Read of Mount Heaton Roscrea, in Ireland, a cousin of the first Duke of Wellington, she had married in 1848 an Austrian landowner Adolf Rheinhold Grohmann of Schloss Wolfgang in the Salzkammergut. She sold her jewels to raise the money. After her husband's death in 1877 she married Oberst Ludwig Reichsritter Schnorr von und zu Caroldsfeld-Brunnlassperg, formerly of the Kaiser Jaeger Regiment. She undertook a major program of restoration of the castle which was then in a derelict state, adding the internal gallery bridges, reroofing the main building, and creating the living quarters largely as they now exist. She had two sons and three daughters.

Her eldest son William Adolf Baillie Grohman, the author, sportsman and traveller, inherited the castle and wrote about it in several of his books, including Tyrol, The Land In The Mountains (1907) and Tyrol (1908). A keen sportsman, he was a friend of American President Teddy Roosevelt who stayed with him at the castle several times. His 1907 history of the Castle, Schloß Matzen im Unterinntal: Kurze geschichtlich remains the definitive account of its early history. Baillie Grohman was a keen collector of furniture and prints and filled the castle with many valuable works. In 1887 Baillie Grohman married Florence Nickalls, eldest daughter of Tom Nickalls, the "Erie King" a successful London financier and Railroad stock jobber. On the outbreak of the 1914-18 war Baillie Grohman and his wife, as British Nationals were refused permission to leave or go beyond the vicinity of the castle, but after the intervention of Prince Auersberg and other friends they eventually were allowed to depart for England. On their return in 1918 they found the Tyrol region in a state of devastation and famine in the aftermath of the war. From their base in Matzen they organized the Tyrolese Relief fund, raising a very considerable sum through friends such as Lord Bryce, British Ambassador for Washington and the Cadburys (English Quaker friends of Florence Nickalls). Florence subsequently used the remaining supplies left over from the Relief fund to establish the Tyrolean Children's Welfare Association to continue providing assistance to the hard-pressed Tyrolese, an organisation taken over and expanded by the Austrian Government in 1926. Florence became the first woman and first foreigner to be awarded the Gold Cross of the Red Cross by the Austrian Government for her unflagging work. A plaque on Brandenberg Church commemorates her good works.

On the death of William Adolf Baillie Grohman in 1921, the main part of the castle passed to his son Harold Tom Baillie Grohman (1888-1980), C.B., D.S.O., O.B.E., who later became Naval Attachée in Peking and a Vice Admiral in the Royal Navy. During the second world war the castle was requisitioned because of its foreign ownership and was used to store historic artifacts from the Tiroler Landesmuseum Ferdinandeum and the University Library in Innsbruck. In the later stages of the war another of Fanny von Carolsfeld's grandsons, Kurt Adolph von Schmedes, who had been bombed out of his house in Vienna and was living in the castle, negotiated the peaceful surrender of the Castle to the advancing American forces and established its status as property of Allied citizens, helping to protect it from further deprivations.

In 1957 Tom's younger son, Captain Michael Tom Baillie Grohman, RN, sold the castle to Ernest J. Kump, an American architect of Austrian ancestry. Captain Baillie Grohman also sold off some the castle's valuable antiques, mostly to Swiss dealers. Mr Kump undertook extensive works to repair the castle walls and fabric and installed oil central heating. He also improved the circulation by adding an internal staircase His restoration work uncovered further gothic wall paintings in 1968. He subsequently left it to his grandson Christopher Kump who opened the castle to paying guests.

In 2008 the castle was acquired by the Rueter family who have undertaken further extensive renovations and opened the castle as a luxury hotel. Most of the gangways and external woodwork has been replaced, the open arcading has been enclosed, the stonework repaired and the windows updated.

=== Matzen in books and other media ===
- An evening at the castle is very sympathetically described in US architect Ralph Adams Cram's weird tale In Kropfsberg Keep (published in 1895 but probably set in the later 1880s).
- The 'gracious lady' who appears in several stories in Tales from Tyrol, is based on Florence Nickalls a former chatelaine of Matzen, commemorated for her good works in the church in Brandenburg (Pfarrkirche Brandberg).
- In 1957, Schloss Matzen served as a filming location for the films Die Zwillinge vom Zillertal (The Zillerthal Twins) and Das einfache Mädchen (The Simple Girl ).
- During the winter of 2011, Austrian symphonic metal band Serenity shot a music video around the castle grounds, for the song 'The Chevalier', which was the lead single from their third studio album, Death & Legacy.

== Architecture ==
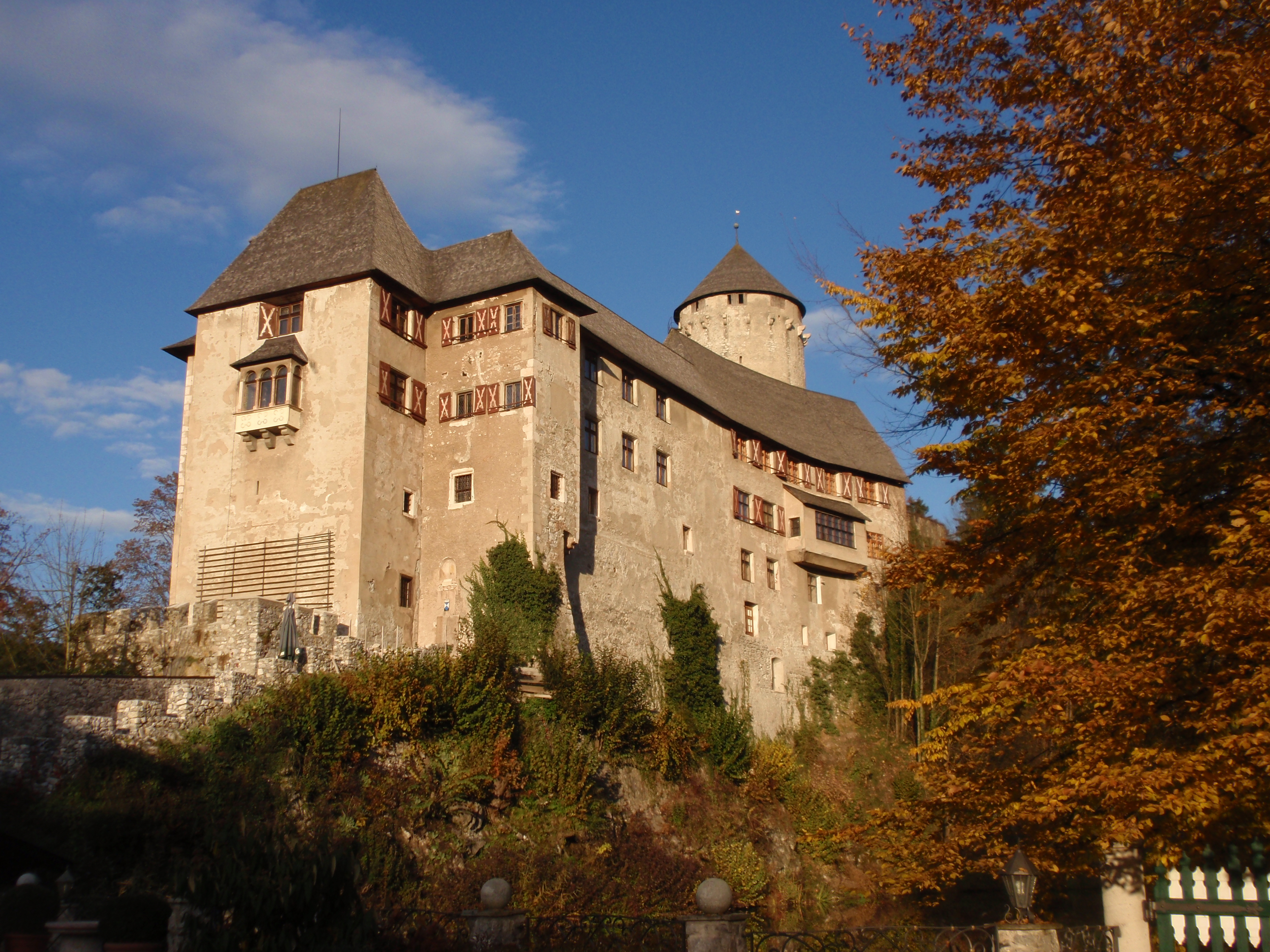
Seen from the southwest in 2009

Two major Romanesque building periods can be discerned in the castles construction, followed by Gothic additions in the 15th century and modifications as a residence in the 16th century. Much of the upper castle had to be rebuilt in the 19th century.

Situated on a rock outcrop on the side of the valley to escape floods from the inn river, the castle is built directly on the living rock. with dungeons and storage rooms carved out from the bedrock. The main edifice comprises a large central block on Romanesque foundations around a four-storey central arcaded courtyard, the elongated north and south wings being linked by a short west wing. The arcades have groined Gothic vaults and octagonal marble columns dating from the first half of the 16th century. A series of wooden galleries criss-cross the sides of the central area opening up the circulation. These were added by Fanny von Carolsveld, who also added the balconied oriel enclosures on the south and west sides which have views of the valley.

The sheer walls of the central block rise without fenestration for four or five stories from the rock outcrop offering a defensive wall. Originally a steep covered passageway led up from the valley floor to the courtyard, where part of the lower "Gut Matzen" block now stands.

On the eastern end of the upper block is linked to a six-story keep tower of ancient origin, notable for its round shape, unusual for the region and believed to be Roman in origin. An upper ring wall with 19th-century machicolations forms the eastern boundary, with a door opening onto an upper drive; previously this was protected by a moat, later was filled in as part of the late 19th-century restoration works and made into a garden.

The interior includes a Gothic chapel with a baroque altar, and a barrel-vaulted Knight's Hall with a large fireplace in the North East corner. The interior includes wooden panelling and hunting trophies. Several medieval wall paintings have been discovered during 20 century restoration of the upper chambers. There are several chamfered Late Gothic door frames in Haguaer marble that were salvaged by Fanny von Carolsfeld from the earlier building. There are a number of rooms containing panelling and furniture from the North Tirol. The castle formerly contained a celebrated crucifix, previously thought to be by Veit Stoss but now attributed to the Danube school. The crucifix was sold by Michael Baillie Grohman and is now owned by the Tiroler Landesmuseum Ferdinandeum There is a drawing by Sir Kyffin Williams of the crucifix

== The park ==
Up until the 19C the castle was surrounded by open meadows and orchards, with a pool on the south side into which the latrines emptied. Before its embankment in the 19c the Inn River frequently flooded. A 1762 plan in the castle archive shows a plan for a pleasure garden laid out along the upper ground leading to the tower.

In the 1880s the successful Berlin Publisher Franz Joseph Freiherr von Lipperheide purchased the parklands surrounding the castle and pressed Fanny von Caroslfeld to sell the main Schloss to him, but she would not. Von Lipperheide instead built his own "Neumatzen" villa and laid out a park with ornamental lake flanked by stone lions, elaborate fake Roman ruins. and carriageways.

== Owners ==
1167(?)-1468	The Knights of Frundsburg
1468-1492	Edler Matheis Türndl
1492(?)-(?)	Anton von Ross
(?) - (?)	Sigmund von Frauenberg
1521(?)- 1550 (?)	Sigmund von Fieger
1550-1559 (?)	Ritter Jakob Zoppl vom Haus
1550?-1560	Ritter George Ilsung von Traztberg
1560-1564	Wolfgang Paller, Burgermaster of Augsburg
1564-1587	George Ilsung von Tratzberg, and his sons Maximilian & Friedrich
1587-1589 (29 January)	Susanna von Schellenburg zu Kisslegg & Anna Fugger, Freyin von Kirchberg, sisters of George Ilsung von Tratzberg
1589 (29 Jan-27 Feb)	Susanna von Schellenburg
1589-1657	Függer Dukes zu Kirchberg and Babenhausen
1657-1658	Anton Girardi, Freiherr zum Stein auf dem Ritten
1658-1684	Mathias Pockh von und zu Arnholz and his children
1684-1734	Freiherrn von Yrsch
1734-1873	Knights of Pfeiffersberg
1873-1908	Frances "Fanny" Grohman (later Schnorr von und zu Caroldsfeld-Brunnlassperg)
1908-1921	William Adolf Baillie Grohman, eldest son of Fanny Schnorr von und zu Caroldsfeld-Brunnlassperg
1908-1921	Vice-Admiral Tom Harold Baillie Grohman, DSC, CBE, OBE eldest son of William Adolf Baillie Grohman
1951-1957	Captain Michael Tom Baillie Grohman, younger son of Vice-Admiral Baillie Grohman
1957-1999	Ernest J. Kump Jr. of Palo Alto, California
1990-1994	Peter Clark Kump of New York, NY, son of Ernest J. Kump
1994-2007	Christopher Kump, of Mendocino California, grandson of Ernst J. Kump
2008-	Rüter family

== See also ==
- William Adolf Baillie Grohman
