= Ernest J. Kump =

American architect

- Born: December 29, 1911; Bakersfield, California
- Died: November 4, 1999 (aged 87); Zurich, Switzerland
- Education: University of California, Berkeley
- Occupation: Architect
- Practice: Franklin & Kump Architects; Kump & Falk Architects; Ernest J. Kump Associates; Kump & Takeda Consultants

Ernest J. Kump Jr. FAIA (December 29, 1911 – November 4, 1999), was an American architect, author, and inventor based in Palo Alto, California. He was widely recognized for his innovations in school planning having designed over 100 public schools in California and 22 community and junior colleges around the world. Kump's most notable projects include Fresno City Hall (1940), the U.S. embassy in Seoul, South Korea (1957), and Foothill College in Los Altos, California.

== Family life ==
Kump was born in Bakersfield, California to architect Ernest Kump Sr. and Mary Petsche. Shortly after his brother Peter was born, Kump's father abandoned the family to set up an architecture practice in Fresno, leaving his mother to raise them alone. Peter became an architect in 1946, and worked in Menlo Park for most of his career. In 1934, Kump married Josephine Clark Miller and had two children.

== Education ==
As a teenager, Kump drafted for pioneer California architect J.N. Saffell (1858–1936) and attended Kern County Union High School where he studied under noted architectural educator Clarence Cullimore FAIA (1885–1963). In 1927, as a high school junior Kump was awarded best draftsman in the school for a set of plans for a Spanish style home. The plans went to Sacramento to be exhibited in the 1927 state fair.

Kump received his B.A. from the University of California, Berkeley in 1932 and began studies for his master's degree in architecture at Harvard University in 1933. He was forced to return to California after one year due to limited funding.

== Career ==
Kump began his professional career in architecture working for his father in Fresno. He fully embraced the modernist movement and Kump Sr., having been classically trained, soon discovered the conflict between their design ideals, referring to his son's work as "chicken coop architecture." Kump Sr. fired his son in 1934.

Kump was immediately hired by Charles Franklin, whom he met while working at his father's office. They established the firm of Franklin & Kump in 1937 with offices in Fresno and Bakersfield. It was during this time when Kump's reputation for brilliance and innovation began. Notable early works include Fowler Grammar School, Bakersfield's Sill Building, and Acalanes High School in Lafayette, hailed by critics as outstanding examples of innovative open plan modular construction.

Franklin & Kump rose to national distinction with their "ultra-modern" design for Fresno City Hall (1941), which was selected by the Museum of Modern Art in New York City as one of the most significant American structures built between 1932 and 1944. They left Fresno for the Bay Area during World War II to provide the military with their architectural knowledge and skills, Franklin to the Corps of Engineers and Kump to the Navy. During that time Kump worked with structural engineer Mark Falk where he applied his ideas on modular and prefabricated construction to produce the Naval Optical and Ordnance Building at Hunters Point, one of the world's first transparent multi-story buildings.

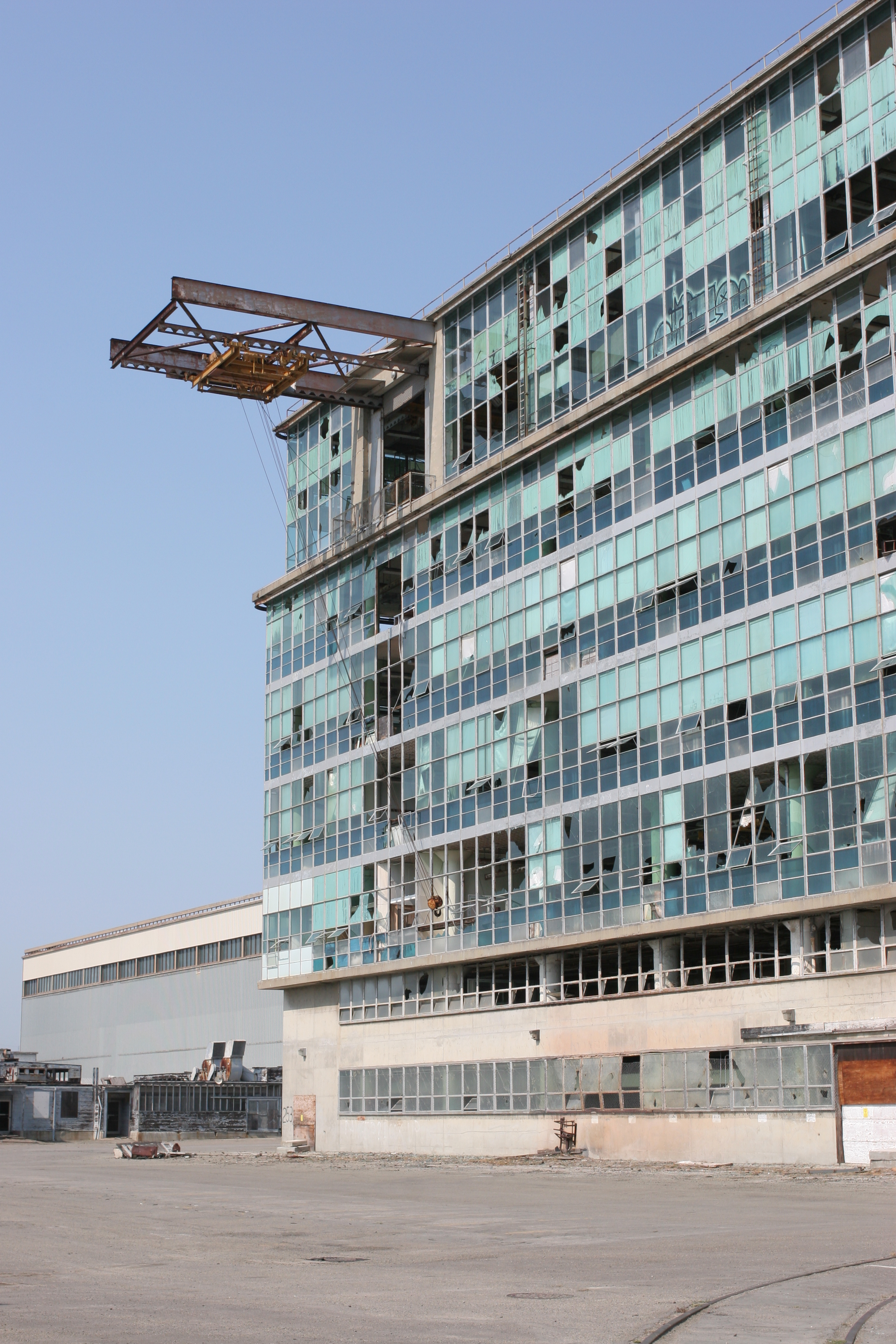
Naval Optical and Ordnance Building at Hunters Point Shipyard, San Francisco, CA.

Following World War II, Franklin, Kump & Falk established a practice in San Francisco. This firm's most prominent work was the high-profile United Airlines Airport Terminal at Merced. This advanced International style facility received highest honors in the 1948 annual awards competition sponsored by Progressive Architecture.

In the late 1940s, Kump's partnership received multiple awards and recognitions due to Kump's influence as a public spokesman for modern architecture. Kump was a panelist on the very significant Planning Man's Physical Environment, a three-day symposium held at Princeton University in 1947 as part of the school's bicentennial celebration along with Alvar Aalto, Serge Chermayeff, Sigfried Giedion, Walter Gropius, Philip Johnson, George Fred Keck, Richard Neutra, Konrad Wachsmann, Frank Lloyd Wright, William Wurster and other eminent practitioners and scholars.

Kump formed Ernest J. Kump Associates in 1955 with offices in Palo Alto and New York. During this period he designed numerous educational buildings in California, including the much lauded Foothill College (with Peter Walker, landscape architect), De Anza College, San Jose State University and Crown College at the University of California, Santa Cruz. Other designs of recognition include the U.S. Embassy in Seoul, South Korea, and the Pacific Lumber Company Headquarters in San Francisco.

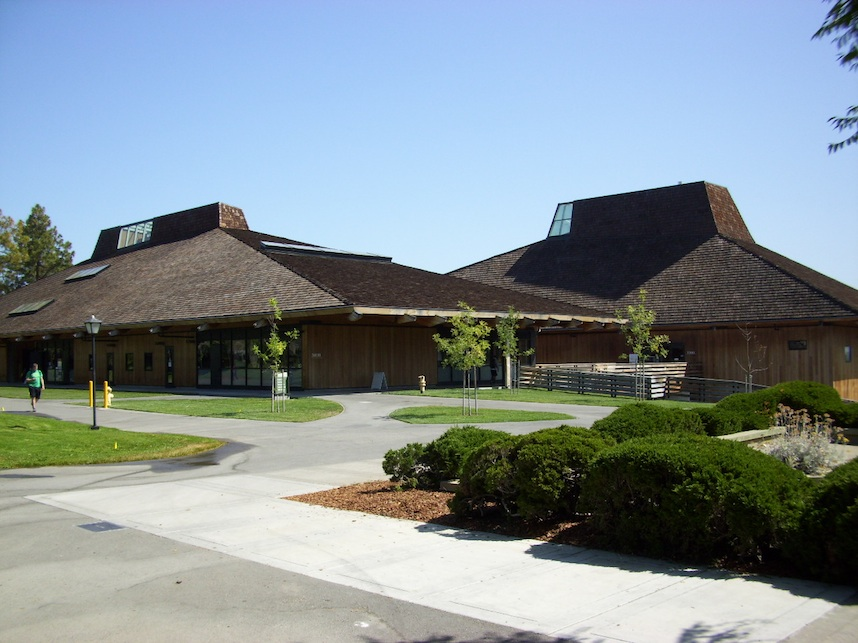
Campus Center at Foothill College, Los Altos Hills, CA.

Kump was part of the Master Planning Committee at the University of California, Santa Cruz, starting in 1961 with Theodore Bernardi, Robert Anshen, John Carl Warnecke and Thomas Church. He became the supervising architect for the UCSC in 1963, and also the architect for Crown College and for the Central Services Building.

== Other projects ==
Kump was a prolific inventor holding 59 international and U.S. patents. During the 1940s, Kump created Prebilt production designs as a solution to low cost, prefabricated structures. This technology was used to create defense housing during a collaboration with the noted firm of Wurster, Bernardi & Emmons. He created Tekkto Systems in 1970 to explore the potential of space age technology for mass production of low-cost housing. That same year, the American Institute of Architects recognized the importance of Ernest J. Kump Associates, praising Kump as "a pioneer of modular practices and systems concepts in architecture."

In 1990, Kump partnered with Hiko Takeda to continue his research and development of modular building systems while acting as a private consultant. Many of his patents, trademarks, and copyrights were a product of this partnership.

Kump authored several books. The most noted of his writings was a short manifesto published in the AIA Journal entitled ″A New Architecture for Man,″ in which he expressed his belief that architecture at its core was the ″expression of feeling through ordered space environment″ and that the basic unit of architectural vocabulary was modular space rather than material. In accordance with these beliefs, he advocated for an architectural design approach based on ″cellular organization of organic units of space environment.″ To achieve ″true organic three–dimensional planning,″ Kump believed that architects should create self–contained modular units that would be both flexible and attractive. The arrangement of these modular units would inherently express order, variety, and economy and result in a better architecture for man.

Kump made several contributions to the profession by serving on President Ronald Reagan's Task Force for Arts and Humanities and teaching at many universities, including Harvard, Columbia, Stanford, and the Massachusetts Institute of Technology. He was elected a Fellow of the American Institute of Architects in 1956, and was a member of the Royal Institute of British Architects, Royal Society of Arts in London, the Academy of Arts, Berlin, and the International Union of Architects and International Arts and Letters in Switzerland. He served as Chair of the American Institute of Architects Committee on School Buildings, 1948–1949; as a judge for the American Institute of Steel Construction's 1949 contest for the most beautiful bridge in the U.S; as an AIA Delegate to the International Congress of Architects, 1951–1955; and as a member of the City of Palo Alto School Planning Committee, 1949–1955.

In 1957 Kump bought Schloss Matzen a historic gothic castle in the Austrian Tyrol. He undertook modernisation works to install central heating, shore up it walls, glaze some of the open arcading and improve the traffic circulation and took a great interest in its medieval construction and intricate floorplan. After his retirement he and his wife Josephine spent several a months a year there.

== Legacy ==
After retiring from active practice in the United States, Kump lived abroad and maintained a London office with Takeda from which he continued working as an international architectural consultant. Until his death, Kump remained dedicated to his research on low-cost modular building systems for housing, educational, and community facilities. Ernest J. Kump Jr., died in Zurich, Switzerland, on November 4, 1999.

== Archives ==
The Ernest J. Kump Collection is held by the Environmental Design Archives at the University of California, Berkeley. The collection spans the years 1928–1992 and documents his career including his education, architectural practice, and patented inventions. The bulk of the collection relates to his architectural projects and is made up of drawings, photographs, photographic slides, and project files. Well documented projects include Acalanes Union High School (1939), College of the Virgin Islands (1965), Ohlone College (1968), the Naval Optical and Ordnance Building at Hunters Point (1948), the U.S. Embassy in Seoul, South Korea (1959), and the University of California, Santa Cruz (1961). Arrangement, description and preservation of this collection was funded by a grant from the National Historic Publications and Records Commission (NHPRC).

Records relating to Foothill College and De Anza College are retained at the Foothill College Archives.
