= Oscar Ferris Watkins =

British colonial administrator (1877–1943)

The Honourable Oscar Ferris Watkins
- Born: Oscar Ferris Watkins; 23 December 1877; Allahabad, Uttar Pradesh, India
- Died: 26 December 1943 (aged 66); Wispers Farm, Nairobi, Kenya Colony
- Education: Marlborough and Oxford
- Alma mater: All Souls College, Oxford
- Parent(s): Rev Oscar Dan Watkins (born Lucknow, India, 1848); Elizabeth Martha née Ferris (born Allahabad, India, 1846)

Lt Col Oscar Ferris Watkins CMG CBE DSO (23 December 1877 – 26 December 1943) was a British colonial administrator, Commandant of the East African Carrier Corps in the First World War. After the war he was acting Kenya Chief Native Commissioner and a Provincial Commissioner, and first editor of a Swahili newspaper Baraza.

He was the son of Rev Oscar Dan Watkins (1848–1926), Archdeacon of Lucknow, and Elizabeth Martha née Ferris (1846–1928) and was born in Allahabad.

Educated at Marlborough and a 'bible clerk', that is undergraduate scholar at All Souls College, Oxford, by virtue of being a founders' kin, in 1899 Watkins cut short his study to enlist in the ranks of the Oxfordshire and Buckinghamshire Light Infantry in the Second Boer War; after the war joining the South African Police. In 1907 he moved to Kenya and as a junior District Commissioner in Kenya he was a magistrate in the Kenya Slave courts, freeing slaves from Arab slavers on the East African coast and developing a lasting interest in Swahili culture.

During the First World War Watkins set up the Carrier Corps,and strove to organise an effective force while at the same time protecting the hundreds of thousands of African porters conscripted into the force from the excessive demands of the British high command. After the war, as acting Kenya Chief Native Commissioner his active stance in protecting the land rights of the native Kenya tribes against the encroachments of white Kenya Settler interests earned him the enmity of the governor Sir Edward Denham. At the outbreak of the Second World War, he used his knowledge of Swahili to broadcast and edit Baraza, a sister paper to the East African Standard, started with a subsidy from the Colonial Government to bolster the British war effort in East Africa.

In 1917 he married Olga Florence née Baillie Grohman, widow of Thomas Acland Douglas Thompson (1881–1915); and daughter of William Adolf Baillie Grohman (1851–1921) and Florence née Nickalls (1861–1945). They had three daughters:

- Olga Penelope Ferris 'Pella' Watkins (1918–1993) who married Oliver Montgomery MC (1922–2016).
- Grace Veronica Ferris 'Ronnie' Watkins (1920–2011) who married Brigadier Patrick Malcolm Hughes MBE (1911–1996)
- Elizabeth June Ferris Watkins (1923–2012) who married Oliver Staniforth Knowles (1920–2008). She wrote biographies of both Olga and Oscar.

== See also ==
- East African campaign (World War I)
- Elizabeth Watkins
- History of Kenya – Colonial History
- History of Tanzania – First World War

== Bibliography ==
- Elizabeth Watkins, Oscar from Africa: The Biography of Oscar Ferris Watkins, 1877-1943. London: Radcliffe Press, 1995.
- Geoffrey Hodges, The Carrier Corps: Military Labor in the East African Campaign, 1914–1918. New York: Greenwood Press, 1986.
