= Tom Nickalls =

British stockbroker & businessman (1828-1899)

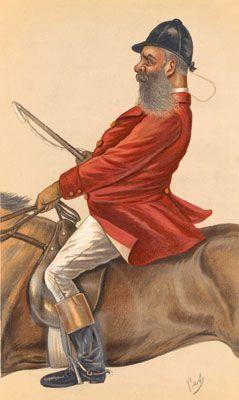
- Caricature published in Vanity Fair in 1885
- Born: 8 September 1828
- Died: 10 May 1899 (aged 70); Surrey, England
- Spouse: Emily Quihampton (m. 1860)
- Children: 12
- Parents: Patteson Nickalls (father); Arabella Chalk (mother)
- Relatives: Patteson Nickalls (brother); Guy Nickalls (son); Vivian Nickalls (son); William Baillie Grohman (son-in-law); Patteson Womersley Nickalls (nephew); Cecil Patteson Nickalls (nephew)

Tom Nickalls (1828–1899) was a stockjobber on the stock exchange and one of the founding members of London Rowing Club. He was known as the "king of the American railroad market" after making his fortune in American railway shares.

== Biography ==
Nickalls was born on 8 September 1828, the son of Patteson Nickalls (1798–1869) and Arabella née Chalk (1799–1893) and brother of Patteson Nickalls he married Emily Quihampton. As a boy he was sent to America to work for an uncle who had a livery stables on Dearborn Street in Chicago, where he gained first-hand knowledge of the surrounding terrain and an understanding of which routes would be of strategic importance for developing railways – information which proved invaluable when he returned to England work as a jobber on the London Stock Exchange. His later successes gained him the soubriquet "The Erie King", following his profitable speculation in shares of the Erie Railroad during the Erie War.

A keen sportsman and for many years a Master of the Surrey Stag Hounds, Tom Nickalls had a hunting lodge at Skalstugan in Sweden. In 1893, he sent four pairs of Norwegian skis as a present to his daughter Florence and son in law William Adolf Baillie Grohman who lived in the Austrian Tyrol – one of the earliest recorded uses of skis in Austria.

Tom Nickalls died on 10 May 1899 in Surrey, United Kingdom.
