= Andrea Gropman =

American pediatric neurologist

- Born: Andrea L. Saperstein
- Other name: Andrea Saperstein-Gropman
- Education: Brandeis University; University of Massachusetts Chan Medical School
- Scientific career
- Fields: Pediatric neurology, neurogenetics
- Workplaces: George Washington University School of Medicine & Health Sciences; Children's National Hospital

Andrea L. Gropman (née Saperstein) is an American pediatric neurologist specializing in neurodevelopmental disabilities and neurogenetics. She is a professor of pediatrics and neurology at the George Washington University School of Medicine & Health Sciences. Gropman is chief of neurogenetics and neurodevelopmental pediatrics and an attending neurologist at Children's National Hospital.

== Life ==
Saperstein's mother is a teacher and her father is a journalist. Her little brother, David Saperstein, also became a neurologist. They attended high school in New England. Gropman earned a B.A. in biology and biochemistry from Brandeis University in 1985. She completed a M.D. at the University of Massachusetts Chan Medical School in 1992. Gropman was a pediatric resident at the Johns Hopkins Hospital from 1992 to 1994. She completed a fellowship in neurology at the Children's National Hospital from 1997 to 2000. She conducted postdoctoral research in genetics and biochemical genetics at the National Human Genome Research Institute from 1997 to 2000.

Gropman is a professor of pediatrics and neurology at the George Washington University School of Medicine & Health Sciences. She is chief of neurogenetics and neurodevelopmental pediatrics and an attending neurologist at Children's National Hospital. Gropman specializes in neurogenetics with a focus on mitochondrial disorders and Smith–Magenis syndrome.
