= Vivian Nickalls =

British rower

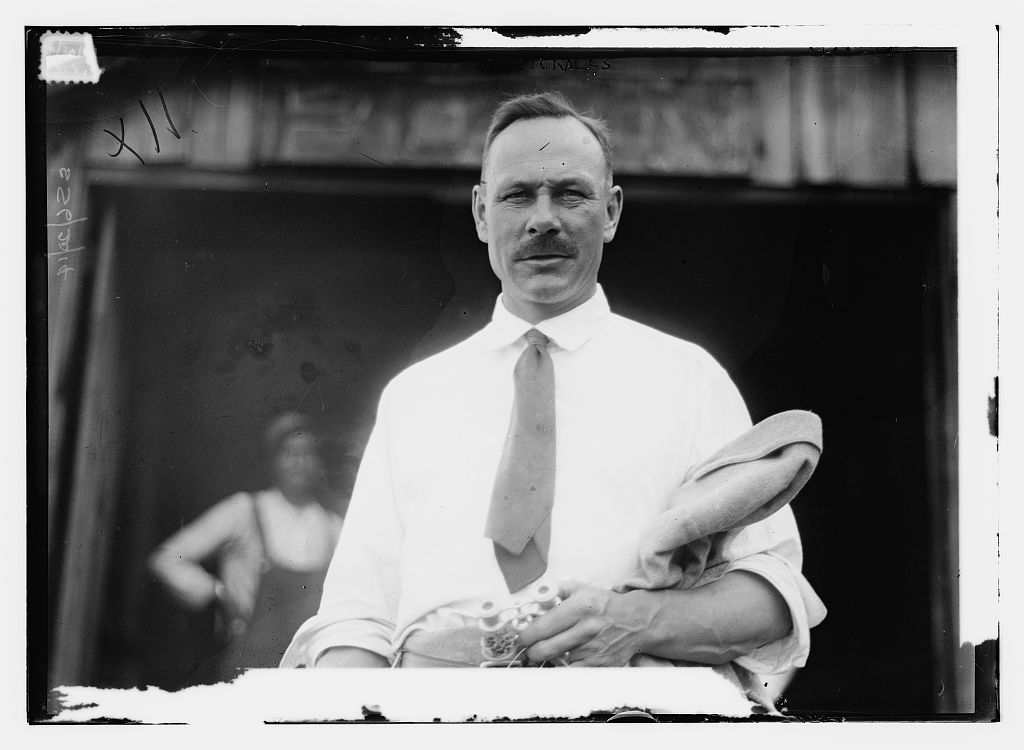
Nickalls on 11 June 1914 on the Hudson River at Poughkeepsie, New York

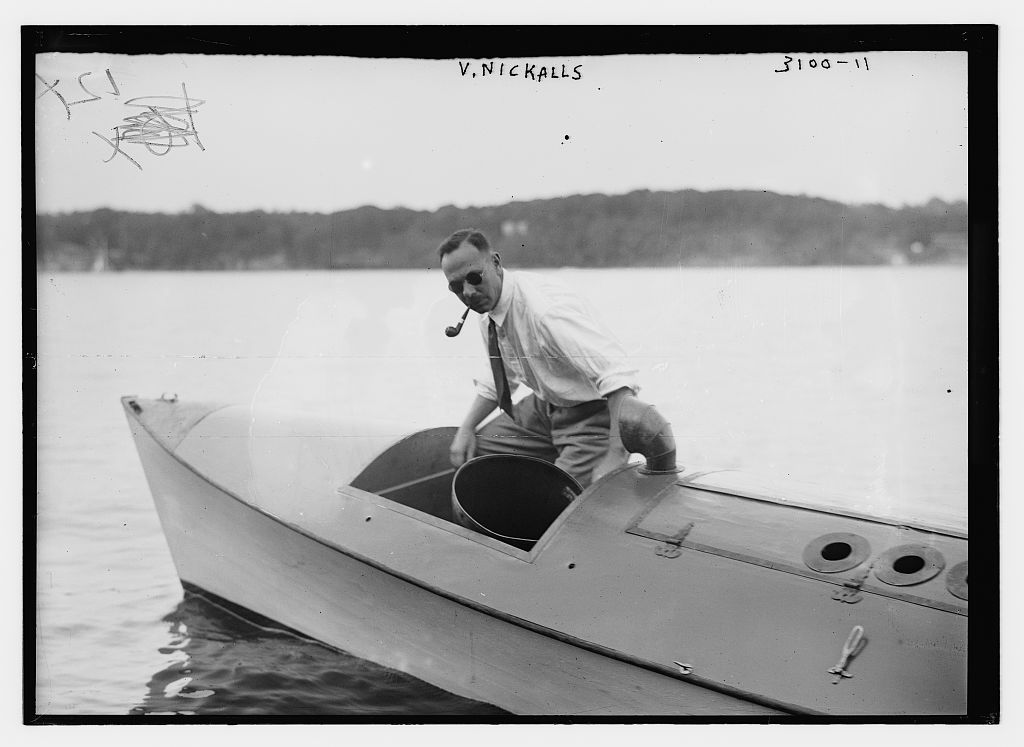
Nickalls on 11 June 1914 on the Hudson River at Poughkeepsie, New York

Vivian Nickalls (1871–1947) was a British rower who won the Wingfield Sculls three times and the Diamond Challenge Sculls at Henley Royal Regatta in 1891.

== Biography ==
Nickalls was born at Farningham, Kent, the son of Tom Nickalls and his wife Emily Quihampton, a notable outdoorswoman. He was baptized on 7 April 1872. His father was a stockjobber on the London Stock Exchange with a particular expertise in investing in American railroads. Nickalls was one of twelve children, of whom his brother Guy Nickalls was also a successful oarsman. Nickalls was educated at Magdalen College, Oxford and rowed with hs brother in the 1891 Boat Race. He won the Diamond Challenge Sculls at Henley in 1891 and the Wingfield Sculls in 1892 and 1894 while at Oxford. He joined London Rowing Club and with his brother he won the Silver Goblets at Henley in 1894, 1895 and 1896 and won the Wingfield Sculls again in 1895.

In 1898, Nickalls married Augusta Dunthorne née Bailey, the daughter of Sir James Bailey MP and Catherine née Smith. They had two daughters. His sister Florence Nickalls married William Adolf Baillie Grohman, an Anglo-Austrian author.

Nickalls went into his father's stockbroking business. The family had connections and property in the United States, and in 1914 Nickalls went to America to coach at the University of Pennsylvania. On arrival he was quoted as saying that he did not propose to use or teach the English stroke, declaring that he considered the way they row at Oxford and Cambridge and the English rowing system in general as "very bad." After the outbreak of World War I he resigned to join the army. He described his wartime experiences in Oars, Wars and Horses published by Hurst & Blackett in 1932. He lived at The High House, Newbury, Berkshire.

He died in 1947.

== See also ==
- List of Oxford University Boat Race crews
