= Grohman Narrows Provincial Park =

Provincial park in British Columbia, Canada

Coordinates: 49.4958°N 117.3444°W

Grohman Narrows Provincial Park is a provincial park in British Columbia, Canada. It is located 5 km from the City of Nelson.

This park is named after William Adolf Baillie Grohman, an Austrian sportsman, mountaineer and pioneer in the Kootenay region of British Columbia.
