= Carrier Corps =

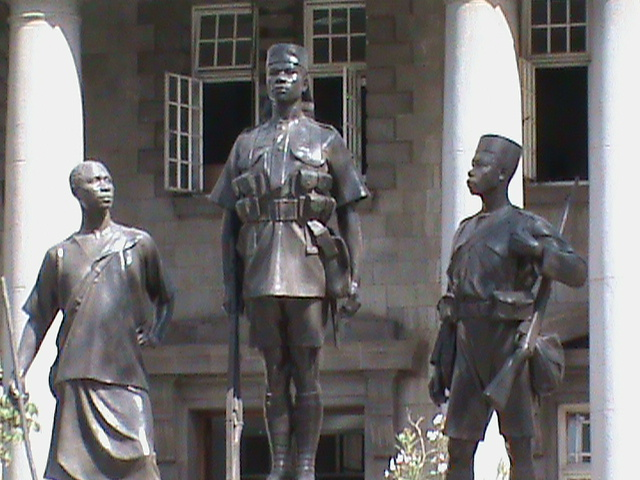
The figure on the left on the Askari Monument in Nairobi, Kenya, represents the Carrier Corps

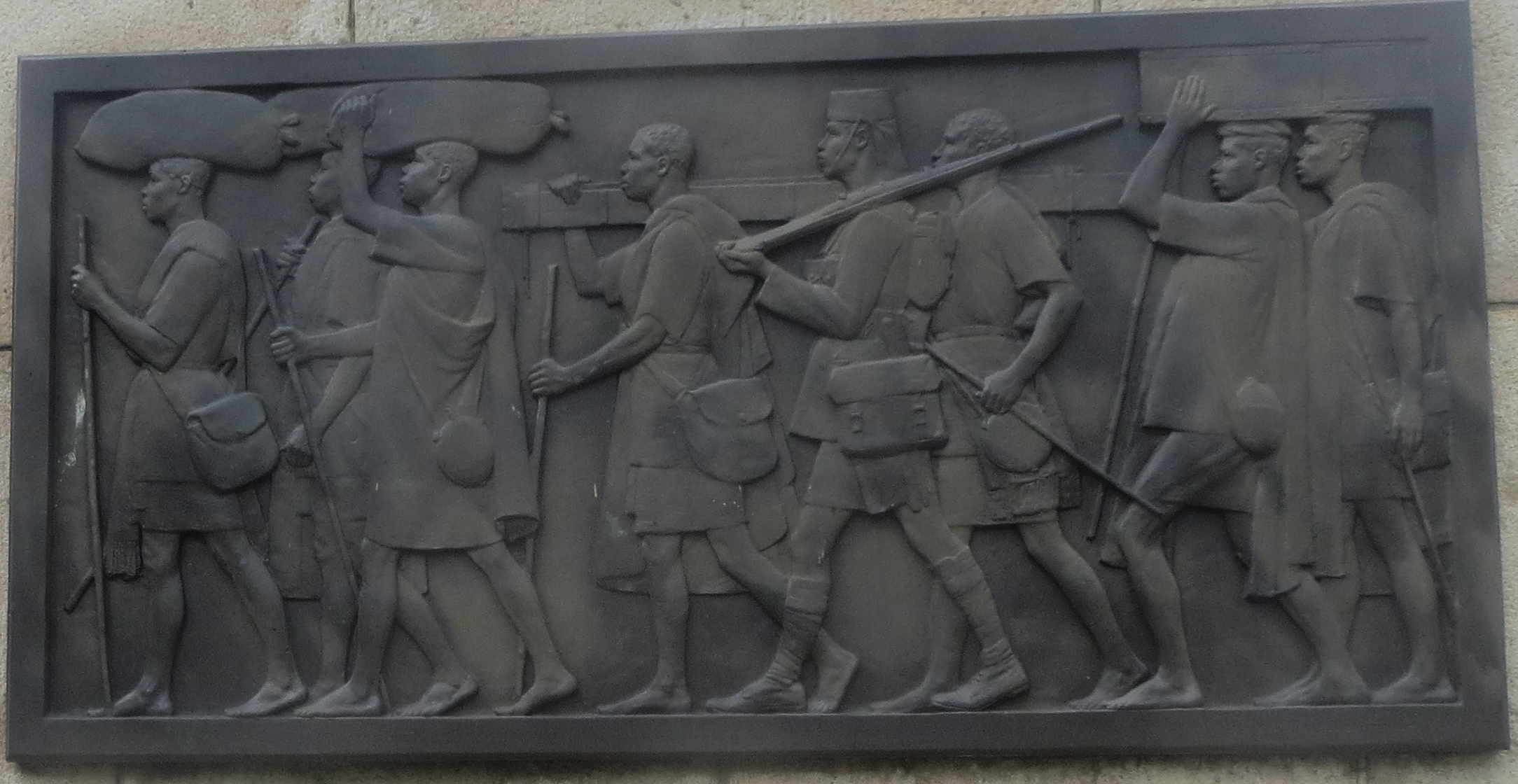
Plaque showing carriers on the Askari Monument in Dar es Salaam, Tanzania

The Carrier Corps was a labour corps created in British East Africa during the First World War to provide military labour to support the British campaign against the German Army in East Africa.

== Service ==
Whereas the Germans, commanded by Paul von Lettow-Vorbeck, armed and trained African askaris to create an effective guerrilla force able to live off the land; the British deployed Indian Army troops under Jan Smuts and keep the King's African Rifles as internal security troops, with limited success. Not only were the Indian Army unused to the terrain, the need to feed a large body of foreign soldiers presented severe logistical problems, as troops in the interior had to be supplied over long distances without rail or road lines of communication. To deliver one kilogram of rice to the interior it could take 50 kilograms of rice at the coast—most of it being consumed en route to feed all the porters needed to carry it inland. The British Administration formed a military labour organisation, the Carrier Corps, which ultimately recruited or conscripted over 400,000 African men for porterage and other support tasks.

The effect on many of the native East African population, then still largely tribal, of being mobilised and then enduring considerable hardship for a remote and largely irrelevant foreign cause had significant effects in the long term, both highlighting the fallibility of the European presence in Africa (as armed askaris readily killed white men), and raising the political awareness of Africans as to the need to stand up for their own interests. The organisation of the Carrier Corps was a remarkable feat of improvisation by a small number of officials of the East African Protectorate's administration, under a District Commissioner Lt Col Oscar Ferris Watkins. Watkins and his officials faced a constant struggle against his superior's excessive demands upon the Carriers and to conscript further native manpower.

== Legacy ==
The Carrier Corps is commemorated on the War Memorials in Kenyatta Avenue, Nairobi and Jomo Kenyatta Avenue, Mombasa. The 14,000 men of the Northern Rhodesian contingent of the Carrier Corps are commemorated on the Mbala War Memorial at the entrance to the town of Mbala (formerly Abercorn) in Northern Zambia. They came from across the territory, with a large contingent from what was then Barotseland in North-Western Rhodesia. The Barotse were recruited by the British South Africa Company Native Commissioner, John Henry Venning, who marched with them to the East African border.

Several East African towns have quarters named after the carrier corps presumably because members of the corps were given housing in these places. Such quarters include Kariakor in Nairobi, Kariakor in Voi, Kariakoo in Dar es Salaam and also in Dodoma.

== See also ==
- John Arthur (missionary)
- History of Kenya – Colonial History
- History of Tanzania – First World War
- I. T. A. Wallace-Johnson
- Frank Weston (bishop of Zanzibar)

== Sources ==
- Hodges, Geoffrey (1997). Kariakor – The Carrier Corps: The Story of the Military Labour Forces in the Conquest of German East Africa, 1914–1918 (2nd revised ed.). Nairobi: Nairobi University Press. ISBN 978-9966-846-44-0.
- Killingray, David; Matthews, James (1979). "Beasts of Burden: British West African Carriers in the First World War". Canadian Journal of African Studies. 13 (1/2): 5+7–23. JSTOR 484636.
- Page, Melvin E. (1978). "The War of Thangata: Nyasaland and The East African Campaign, 1914–1918". The Journal of African History. 19 (1): 87–100. doi:10.1017/s0021853700015966. JSTOR 180613. S2CID 163075126.
- Paice, Edward (2007). Tip and Run: The Untold Tragedy of the Great War in Africa. London: Weidenfeld & Nicolson. ISBN 978-0-297-84709-0.
- Savage, Donald C.; Munro, J. Forbes (1966). "Carrier Corps Recruitment in the British East Africa Protectorate 1914–1918". The Journal of African History. 7 (2): 313–342. doi:10.1017/s0021853700006344. JSTOR 179957. S2CID 163079542.
