= Emily Quihampton =

British mountain climber (1834–1909)

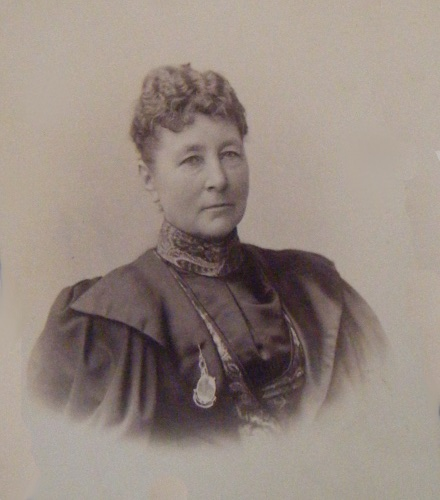
- Emily Quihampton
- Born: 19 July 1834; Essex, England
- Died: 29 March 1909 (aged 74)
- Occupations: Outdoor enthusiast & mountaineer
- Spouse: Tom Nickalls (m. 1860; died 1899)
- Children: 12
- Parents: Henry Quihampton (father); Jane Rush (mother)
- Relatives: Guy Nickalls (son); Vivian Nickalls (son); William Adolf Baillie Grohman (son-in-law)

Emily Quihampton (19 July 1834 – 29 March 1909) was a 19th-century outdoor enthusiast who was the first woman to climb Mont Blanc and Monte Rosa in the same week. These peaks are the highest mountains in France and Switzerland. In his autobiography, Life's a pudding, her son Guy Nickalls says this was in 1868. If this is correct, she would have been pregnant at the time as she gave birth to a daughter, Grace in October 1868.

== Biography ==
Quihampton was the fifth of nine children of Henry Quihampton and his wife Jane Rush of Little Totham, Maldon, Essex. In 1860 she married Tom Nickalls, a jobber on the London Stock Exchange with a particular expertise in investing in American railroads. He was one of the founding members of London Rowing Club. Together they had twelve children.

Her son Guy Nickalls was an extremely successful rower, winning a gold medal in the 1908 summer Olympic Games. Another son, Vivian Nickalls was also a successful oarsman.

Her daughter Florence married William Adolf Baillie-Grohman, an Anglo-Austrian author. Florence and her husband organised the Tyrolean Relief fund after the first world war to help the destitute population of Trol.
