= Guy Nickalls =

British rower (1866–1935)

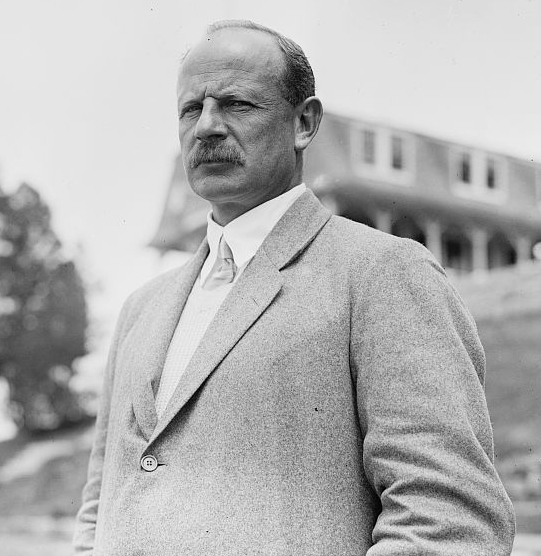
- Nickalls circa 1915
- Born: 13 November 1866; Sutton, London
- Died: 8 July 1935 (aged 68)
- Education: Eton College and Magdalen College Oxford
- Occupation: rower
- Children: Guy Oliver Nickalls
- Parent(s): Tom Nickalls & Emily Quihampton
- Relatives: Vivian Nickalls, brother

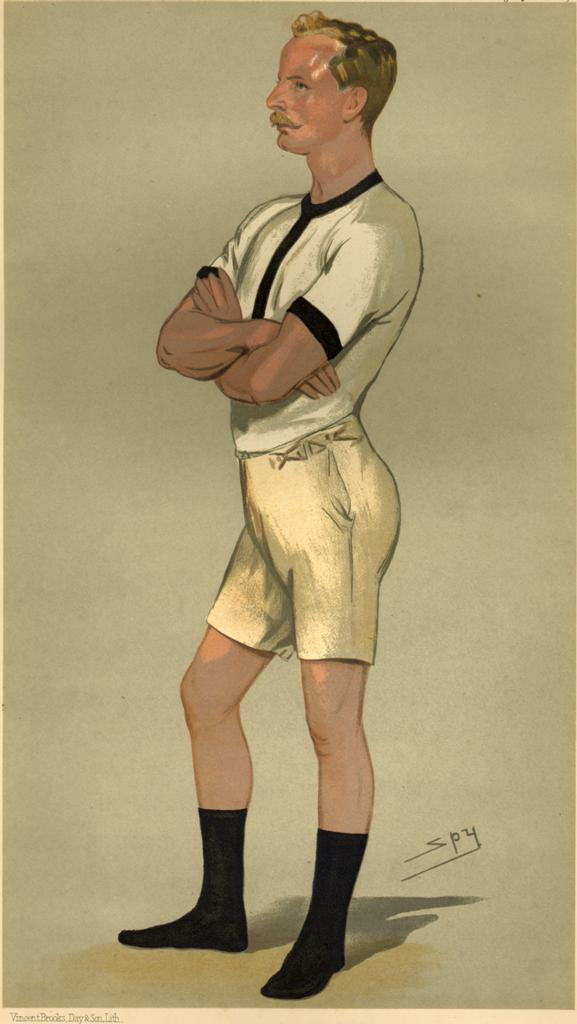
Vanity Fair "Spy" caricature from 1889

Guy Nickalls (13 November 1866 – 8 July 1935) was a British rower who competed in the 1908 Summer Olympics as a member of the British eight that won gold, won 22 events at Henley Royal Regatta and won the Wingfield Sculls three times.

== Early life and education ==
Nickalls was born at Sutton, then in Surrey, the son of Tom Nickalls (1827–1899) who was a stockjobber on the stock exchange and one of the founding members of the London Rowing Club. His mother, Emily Quihampton was the first woman to climb Mont Blanc and Monta Rosa in the same week. Guy was one of twelve children, of whom his brother Vivian was also a successful oarsman.

Nickalls was educated at Eton College, where he was known as "Luni" due to his reckless behaviour. He played football with success, and when not engaged in athletically breaking his bones or risking his neck, he would row. At Eton, he won the Junior Sculling in 1884, the School Pulling in 1885/86, and School Sculling in 1885. His ability was soon noticed, and he secured the four seats in the Eton Eight, carrying off the Ladies' Challenge Plate at Henley Royal Regatta in 1885.

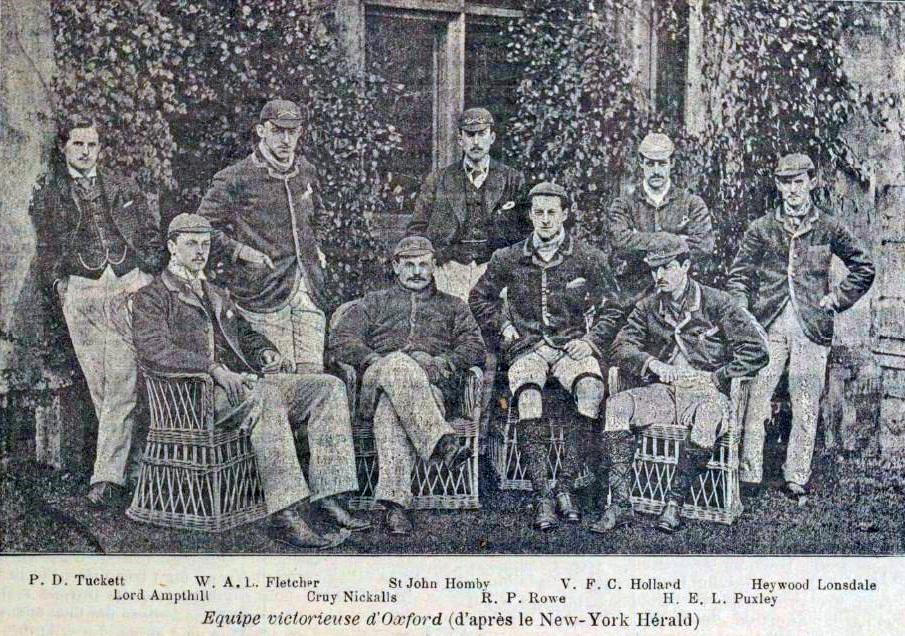
The 1890 Oxford rowing crew, Nickalls is sitting at the centre front

Nickalls went up to Magdalen College, Oxford in 1886. At Oxford, he won the University Sculls in 1887, the University Pairs in 1888, 1889 and 1890 – with W.F.D. Smith once and twice with Lord Ampthill – and the University Fours in 1886, 1887, 1888 and 1889. He went head of the river in 1888 with Magdalen and rowed for Oxford in the Boat Race for five years from 1887 to 1891 losing three races and winning two. He was O.U.B.C. President in 1890. During his time at Oxford, he showed his prowess as a sculler, winning the Wingfield Sculls in 1887 when his defeated opponents were "Jumps" Gardner and Steve Fairbairn, 1888 when he beat Gardner again and 1889 when no one would race against him. He lost the Diamond Challenge Sculls in 1887 to Gardner. However, he won in 1888, 1889 and 1890, beating Gilbert Kennedy in the last year. In 1890 he also won Silver Goblets partnering Lord Ampthill.

== Main rowing career ==
Medal record

Men's rowing

Representing Great Britain

Olympic Games
Gold medal – first place	1908 London	Eight

After Oxford, Nickalls joined Leander, of which he was Captain in 1892 and 1897 and took the main prizes at Henley Royal Regatta over the next seven years. His Leander crew won the Grand Challenge Cup in 1891 and 1892, and in 1891, he and Ampthill won Silver Goblets again. In 1893, he was in the Magdalen crew that won the Stewards' Challenge Cup and won the Diamonds again against Kennedy. In 1894, he won Silver Goblets, partnering with his brother Vivian, whom he defeated in the same year in the Diamonds. Vivian Nickalls became a member of London Rowing Club, and Guy joined them to win the Stewards in 1895, and the brothers also won Silver Goblets again that year. However, Guy lost Diamonds that year to Rupert Guinness. In 1896, Nickalls had three wins – the Grand with Leander, Stewards with London Rowing Club, and Silver Goblets with his brother. In 1897 he won Stewards with Leander and Silver Goblets with E. R. Balfour.

After a break of several years, Nickalls was a member of the Leander crew that won the Grand in 1905, but over the next few years, the dominant eight in the event was the Belgian crew from Royal Club Nautique de Gand. Nickalls was a member of the winning crews in the Stewards in 1905, 1906 and 1907. In 1908, he was a member of the Leander eight, which was assembled to challenge the Belgians rowing at the 1908 Summer Olympics and beat them to win the gold medal for Great Britain.

== Later career ==
From 1913 to 1916, Nickalls coached Yale, enticed to New Haven by Averell Harriman, and a sufficient salary to help see his two sons through Eton. Though his Yale crews won two of the three years he was there, Nickalls found the environment stressful and foreign. He was partly to blame, by spouting opinions better left unsaid or, if said, certainly not within earshot of the attentive rowing press. Yet such remarks – "Their paddling is bad, their rowing, worse" (about the Yale 1916 crew){—were wholly in line with his personality: as O.U.B.C. President, he nearly scotched the 1890 Boat Race by calling the Cambridge crew "probably a poorer lot than usual" in an official letter to his counterpart, S.D. Muttlebury.

Nickalls tried to join the army in 1914 on the outbreak of war but was turned down on account of age. By late 1917, the army had a change of heart, sending him to France, then age fifty, as a Captain in the 23rd Lancashire Fusiliers in charge of physical and bayonet training. After the war, he resumed his career as a stockbroker.

When Zürich Rowing Club won the Stewards on 6 July 1935, Nickalls told Gully, "Thank God I have been spared to see what I believe to be the finest four of all time". The next morning, he was in a car crash near Leeds en route to Scotland for a fishing holiday and died in hospital the following evening. On the same day, his school friend and rowing partner, Lord Ampthill, died.

== Personal ==
Nickalls married Ellen Gilbey Gold in London in 1898. She was the sister of Sir Harcourt Gold, who was chairman of Henley Royal Regatta from 1945 to 1952 and Chairman of the ARA from 1948 to 1952. Their son Guy Oliver Nickalls was also a rower who competed in two Olympic games. Nickalls snr. co-authored a history of the noted Irish actor and comedian Thomas Doggett and his eponymous rowing race.

== Rowing achievements ==
=== Olympic Games ===
- 1908 – Gold, Eight (racing in a Leander crew representing Great Britain)

=== Henley Wins ===
- 1885 – Ladies Plate (racing as Eton College)
- 1888 – Diamond Challenge Sculls (racing as Magd. Coll., Oxon)
- 1889 – Diamond Challenge Sculls (racing as Magd. Coll., Oxon)
- 1890 – Silver Goblets (with Lord Ampthill, racing as OUBC)
- 1890 – Diamond Challenge Sculls (racing as Magd. Coll., Oxon)
- 1891 – Grand Challenge Cup (racing as Leander Club)
- 1891 – Silver Goblets (with Lord Ampthill, racing as Leander Club)
- 1892 – Grand Challenge Cup (racing as Leander Club)
- 1893 – Stewards' Challenge Cup (racing as Magd. Coll., Oxon)
- 1893 – Diamond Challenge Sculls (racing as Magd. Coll., Oxon)
- 1894 – Silver Goblets (with V. Nickalls racing as Formosa BC)
- 1894 – Diamond Challenge Sculls (racing as Formosa BC)
- 1895 – Stewards' Challenge Cup (racing as London RC)
- 1895 – Silver Goblets (with V. Nickalls racing as London RC)
- 1896 – Grand Challenge Cup (racing as Leander Club)
- 1896 – Stewards' Challenge Cup (racing as London RC)
- 1896 – Silver Goblets (with V. Nickalls racing as London RC)
- 1897 – Stewards' Challenge Cup (racing as Leander Club)
- 1897 – Silver Goblets (with E.R Balfour racing as Leander Club)
- 1905 – Grand Challenge Cup (racing as Leander Club)
- 1905 – Stewards' Challenge Cup (racing as Leander Club)
- 1906 – Stewards' Challenge Cup (racing as Leander Club)
- 1907 – Stewards' Challenge Cup (racing as Magd. Coll., Oxon)

=== Wingfield Sculls ===
- 1887
- 1888
- 1889

== See also ==
- List of Oxford University Boat Race crews
