= Patteson Womersley Nickalls =

English polo player (1877-1946)

Patteson Womersley Nickalls DSO
- Born: 23 January 1877; North Weald, Essex, England
- Died: 10 September 1946 (aged 69)
- Education: Rugby School; New College, Oxford
- Occupation: Stockbroker
- Parents: Patteson Nickalls (father); Florence Womersley (mother)
- Relatives: Cecil Patteson Nickalls (brother); Charles Budworth (brother-in-law)
- Military career
- Allegiance: United Kingdom
- Branch: British Army
- Service years: 1900-1901; 1914-1918
- Rank: Major
- Units: Durham Light Infantry; Northamptonshire Yeomanry
- Conflicts: Second Anglo-Boer War; Relief of Ladysmith; Battle of Colenso; World War I; Western Front
- Awards: Distinguished Service Order
- Sports career
Medal record
Representing Great Britain
Men's Polo
Gold medal – first place	1908 London	Team competition

Patteson Womersley Nickalls DSO (23 January 1877 – 10 September 1946), was an English polo player who competed in the 1908 Summer Olympics for Great Britain.

== Biography ==
Nickalls was born on 23 January 1877 at North Weald, Essex, the son of Sir Patteson Nickalls, a stockbroker, and his wife Florence. He was educated at Rugby School. There he was in the cricket XI from 1892 to 1894 and in the rugby XV in 1893. He went to New College, Oxford, played in the Varsity Match for the Oxford University Polo Club in 1895-6-7, and graduated with a BA in 1897. In 1900, he was gazetted to the Durham Light Infantry and served in the Second Anglo-Boer War. He took part in the Relief of Ladysmith and the Battle of Colenso. He retired from the army in 1901 and became a member of the London Stock Exchange.

Nickalls played polo for England in the 1902 International Polo Cup matches. He was a member of the winning teams in the Roehampton Trophy in 1904 and 1905. In 1905, he played for the Roehampton Club, and in 1908, the Roehampton team represented Great Britain at the 1908 Summer Olympics in London and won the gold medal. He captained the English team against America in 1909 in the Westchester Cup with a handicap of +8.

Nickalls served on the Western Front in World War I in the Northamptonshire Yeomanry. He wrote an account of fox hunting behind the lines in 1916. He remained a major in the Territorial Reserve, having been awarded the Distinguished Service Order in 1918, until 1926.

Nickalls died on 10 September 1946 at the age of 69.
