= Cecil Patteson Nickalls =

English polo player

Cecil Patteson Nickalls D.S.O.
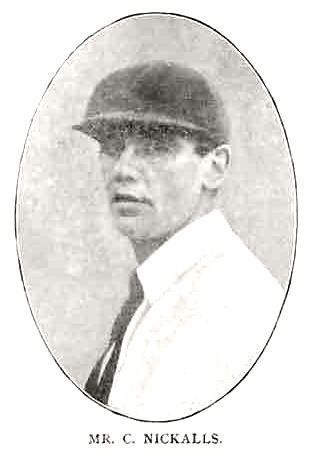
- Born: 14 October 1877; Kent, England
- Died: 7 April 1925 (aged 47); Rugby, England
- Known for: International Polo Cup
- Spouse: Olivia Mary Miller (m. 1904–1925) ended with his death
- Children: 2
- Parent: Sir Patteson Nickalls
- Relatives: Patteson Womersley Nickalls, brother Morres Nickalls, brother

Cecil Patteson Nickalls, D.S.O. (14 October 1877 – 7 April 1925) was a colonel in the Royal Field Artillery. He was a champion polo player, and a champion rugby player, who killed himself with a gun on 7 April 1925.

== Early life ==
He was born on 14 October 1877 in Kent, England to Sir Patteson Nickalls. His siblings were, Patteson Womersley Nickalls and Morres Nickalls. He was educated at Rugby School.

== Career ==
In the 1890s he played cricket. He scored 109 at Lord's Cricket Ground against Marlborough for Rugby in 1894.

He was on the British team that won the International Polo Cup at the Hurlingham Club in 1902 with his brother Patteson Womersley Nickalls, Frederick Maitland Freake, Walter Selby Buckmaster, George Arthur Miller and Charles Darley Miller. He played on the English team against Ireland in 1905 and 1911.

He served as a captain in the Royal Field Artillery in World War I. He was awarded the DSO and wounded.

== Personal life ==
He married Olivia Mary Miller in 1904 in Rugby, England.

== Death ==
Nickalls committed suicide with a gun on 7 April 1925 in Rugby, England.
