= Rowing at the 1908 Summer Olympics =

Coordinates: 51.5551°N 0.8903°W

Rowing at the Games of the IV Olympiad
- Venue: Henley-on-Thames
- Dates: 28–31 July 1908
- Competitors: 81 from 8 nations

At the 1908 Summer Olympics, four rowing events were contested, all for men only. Races were held at Henley-on-Thames. The competitions were held from 28 to 31 July. There was one fewer event in 1908 than 1904, after the double sculls was dropped from the programme. Hungary and Norway competed in rowing for the first time, along with six other nations.

== Medal summary ==
Event	Gold	Silver	Bronze	Bronze
Single sculls	Harry Blackstaffe (GBR)	Alexander McCulloch (GBR)	Bernhard von Gaza (GER)	Károly Levitzky (HUN)
Coxless pair	John Fenning and Gordon Thomson (GBR)	George Fairbairn and Philip Verdon (GBR)	Frederick Toms and Norway Jackes (CAN)	Martin Stahnke and Willy Düskow (GER)
Coxless four	Great Britain; Collier Cudmore; James Angus Gillan; Duncan Mackinnon; John Somers-Smith	Great Britain; Philip Filleul; Harold Barker; John Fenning; Gordon Thomson	Canada; Gordon Balfour; Becher Gale; Charles Riddy; Geoffrey Taylor	Netherlands; Hermannus Höfte; Albertus Wielsma; Johan Burk; Bernardus Croon
Eights	Great Britain; Albert Gladstone; Frederick Kelly; Banner Johnstone; Guy Nickalls; Charles Burnell; Ronald Sanderson; Raymond Etherington-Smith; Henry Bucknall; Gilchrist Maclagan	Belgium; Oscar Taelman; Marcel Morimont; Rémy Orban; Georges Mys; François Vergucht; Polydore Veirman; Oscar de Somville; Rodolphe Poma; Alfred Van Landeghem	Canada; Irvine Robertson; Joseph Wright; Julius Thomson; Walter Lewis; Gordon Balfour; Becher Gale; Charles Riddy; Geoffrey Taylor; Douglas Kertland	Great Britain; Frank Jerwood; Eric Powell; Oswald Carver; Edward Williams; Henry Goldsmith; Harold Kitching; John Burn; Douglas Stuart; Richard Boyle

== Participating nations ==
81 rowers from 8 nations competed.

- Belgium (10)
- Canada (13)
- Germany (3)
- Great Britain (30)
- Hungary (11)
- Italy (1)
- Netherlands (4)
- Norway (9)

== Medal table ==
Rank	Nation	Gold	Silver	Bronze	Total
1	Great Britain	4	3	1	8
2	Belgium	0	1	0	1
3	Canada	0	0	3	3
4	Germany	0	0	2	2
5	Hungary	0	0	1	1
5	Netherlands	0	0	1	1
Totals (6 entries)		4	4	8	16
