= The Boat Race 1909 =

66th Boat Race
- Date: 3 April 1909
- Winner: Oxford
- Margin of victory: 3 1/2 lengths
- Winning time: 19 minutes 50 seconds
- Overall record (Cambridge–Oxford): 30–35
- Umpire: Frederick I. Pitman (Cambridge)

The 66th Boat Race took place on 3 April 1909. Held annually, the Boat Race is a side-by-side rowing race between crews from the Universities of Oxford and Cambridge along the River Thames. Cambridge were reigning champions, having won the previous year's race, while Oxford's heavier crew contained three Olympic gold medallists. In a race umpired by Frederick I. Pitman, Oxford won by 3 1/2 lengths in a time of 19 minutes 50 seconds. It was their first win in four races and took the overall record to 35–30 in their favour.

== Background ==
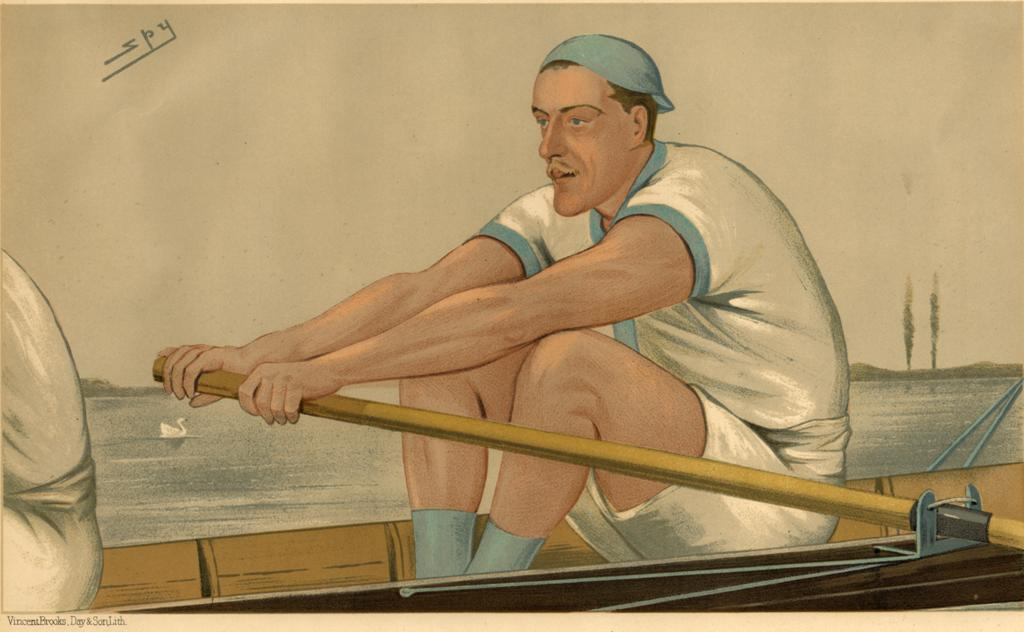
Former Cambridge University Boat Club rower Stanley Muttlebury coached the Light Blues.

The Boat Race is a side-by-side rowing competition between the University of Oxford (sometimes referred to as the "Dark Blues") and the University of Cambridge (sometimes referred to as the "Light Blues"). The race was first held in 1829, and since 1845 has taken place on the 4.2-mile (6.8 km) Championship Course on the River Thames in southwest London. The rivalry is a major point of honour between the two universities; it is followed throughout the United Kingdom and, as of 2015, broadcast worldwide. Cambridge went into the race as reigning champions, having won the 1908 race by 2 1/2 lengths, while Oxford led overall with 34 victories to Cambridge's 30 (excluding the "dead heat" of 1877).

Oxford's coaches were G. C. Bourne who had rowed for the university in the 1882 and 1883 races, Francis Escombe (for the sixth consecutive year), Harcourt Gilbey Gold (Dark Blue president for the 1900 race and four-time Blue), W. F. C. Holland who had rowed for Oxford four times between 1887 and 1890, and Felix Warre (who had rowed in 1898 and 1899). Cambridge were coached by Stanley Muttlebury, five-time Blue between 1886 and 1890, and David Alexander Wauchope (who had rowed in the 1895 race). For the sixth year the umpire was old Etonian Frederick I. Pitman who rowed for Cambridge in the 1884, 1885 and 1886 races.

Former rower and author George Drinkwater noted that Oxford had "a considerable wealth of material" at their disposal, while Cambridge had "very good Trial Eights". He went on to describe Oxford as "a very rough crew" upon arrival at Putney. Conversely, Cambridge "rapidly got together" and despite a late replacement at bow, Cambridge were favourites to win the race.

== Crews ==
The Oxford crew weighed an average of 12 st 8.25 lb (79.8 kg), 3.25 pounds (1.5 kg) per rower more than their opponents. Cambridge's crew contained three rowers with Boat Race experience, including H. E. Kitching, Edward Williams and Douglas Stuart. Oxford saw six crew members return to the boat, including Alister Kirby and Albert Gladstone, both of whom were making their fourth consecutive appearances. Six occupants of the Dark Blue boat were educated at Eton College. Oxford's number three, Australian Collier Cudmore, was the only non-British participant registered in the race. Three of the Oxford crew who were studying at Magdalen College, Duncan Mackinnon, James Angus Gillan and Cudmore, were gold medallists in the men's coxless four at the 1908 Summer Olympics. The Dark Blues' number two, Harold Barker, and Cambridge's number three, Gordon Thomson (rower), won silver in the same event. Thomson also won gold in the coxless pair. Cambridge's number five, Williams, won a bronze medal in the men's eight in the same Olympiad. Six of the Oxford crew were studying at Magdalen College, while five of Cambridge's were matriculated at Trinity Hall.

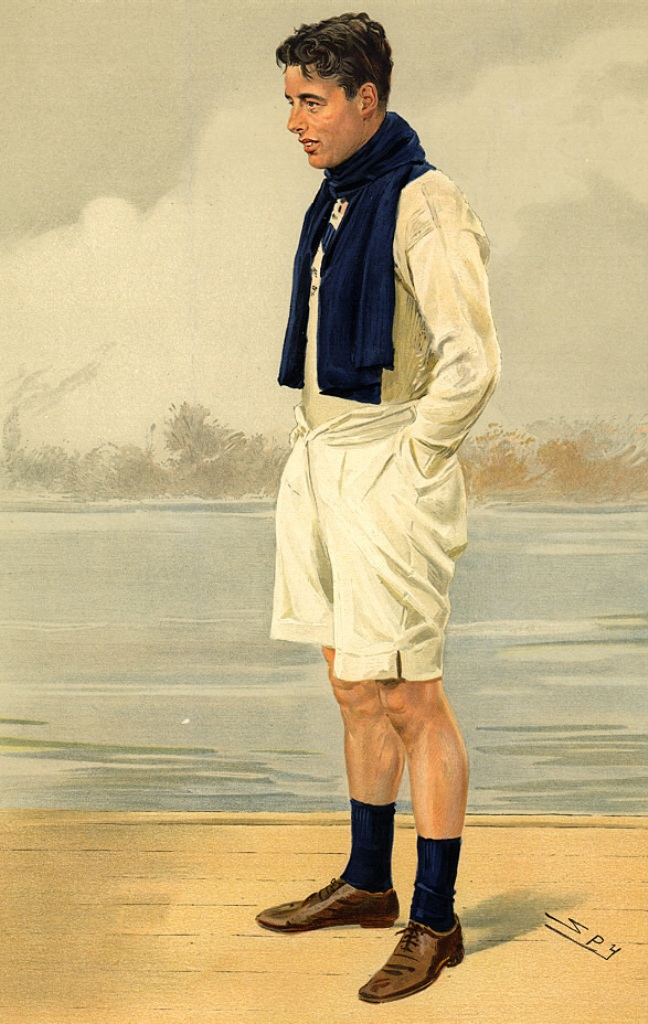
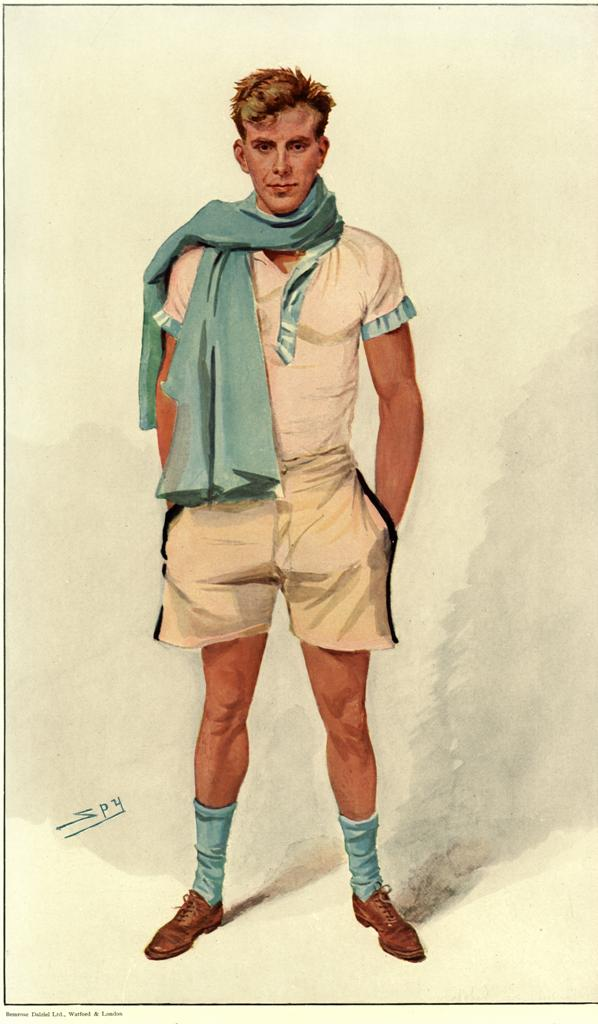
Duncan Mackinnon (left) rowed at number five for Oxford while Douglas Stuart stroked the Cambridge boat.

Seat	Oxford			Cambridge		
Seat	Name	College	Weight	Name	College	Weight
Bow	A. C. Gladstone	Christ Church	11 st 6.5 lb	R. W. M. Arbuthnot	3rd Trinity	10 st 2 lb
2	H. R. Barker	Christ Church	12 st 5 lb	H. E. Swanston	Jesus	12 st 4 lb
3	C. R. Cudmore	Magdalen	12 st 4 lb	G. L. Thomson	Trinity Hall	12 st 6 lb
4	A. S. Garton	Magdalen	13 st 8.5 lb	H. E. Kitching	Trinity Hall	12 st 12 lb
5	D. Mackinnon	Magdalen	13 st 3.5 lb	E. G. Williams	3rd Trinity	13 st 0 lb
6	J. A. Gillan	Magdalen	13 st 1 lb	J. B. Rosher	1st Trinity	14 st 0 lb
7	A. G. Kirby (P)	Magdalen	13 st 10.5 lb	E. S. Hornidge	Trinity Hall	13 st 0 lb
Stroke	R. C. Bourne	Christ Church	10 st 13 lb	D. C. R. Stuart (P)	Trinity Hall	11 st 2 lb
Cox	A. W. F. Donkin	Magdalen	8 st 8 lb	G. D. Compston	Trinity Hall	8 st 10 lb
Source: (P) – boat club president

== Race ==
The Championship Course along which the Boat Race is contested

Cambridge won the toss and elected to start from the Surrey station, handing the Middlesex side of the river to Oxford. Drinkwater described the conditions as "perfect" and umpire Pitman started the race at 12:38 p.m. Both crews made strong starts but Oxford edged ahead and held a third of a length lead after a minute which they extended to a half-length after two minutes. The Cambridge stroke Stuart kept the Light Blue stroke rate high round the bend to the Mile Post and his counterpart Bourne allowed them to draw level by Harrods Furniture Depository.

As the crews passed below Hammersmith Bridge, Cambridge held a slender lead. Despite a number of spurts from Oxford, the Light Blues held on to the lead, but relinquished it briefly before Stuart spurted once again as the crews passed into Corney Reach to re-take the lead. Oxford pushed on 300 yards (270 m) before Barnes Bridge and left Cambridge behind "as if standing". Clear at Barnes Bridge, Oxford extended their lead with every stroke and won by three and a half lengths in a time of 19 minutes 50 seconds. It was Oxford's first victory in four years and took the overall record in the event to 35–30 in their favour.
