= Johan Burk =

Dutch rower

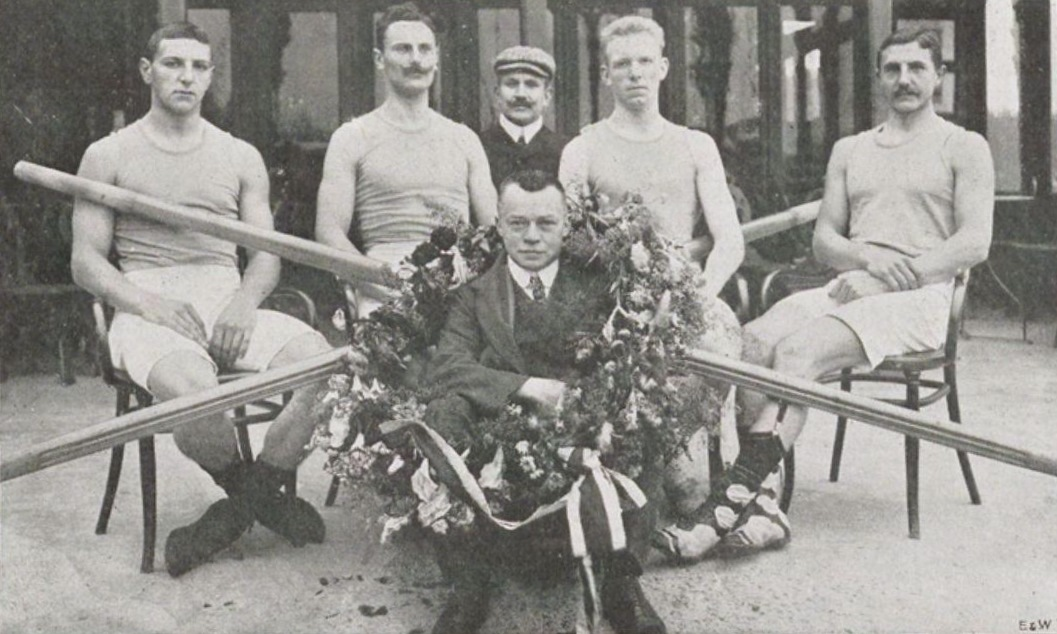
- Burk in 1907

Personal information
- Full name: Johan Frederik Karel Hendrik Jacob Burk
- Nickname: John Burk
- National team: The Netherlands
- Born: 11 May 1887 Amsterdam, Netherlands
- Occupation: Clerk
- Height: 6 ft 2 in (188 cm)
- Weight: 81 kg (179 lb)
- Spouse: Anna Helena Albertiene Schuitema (m. 1910; died 1957)

Sport
- Country: The Netherlands
- Sport: Rowing
- Position: Rower
- Event: Men's coxless fours
- Partner(s): Hermannus Höfte, Albertus Wielsma, Bernardus Croon
- Coached by: J. J. K. Oohms

Achievements and titles
- Olympic finals: 1908 Summer Olympics: Men's Coxless Fours Rowing – Bronze
Medal record
Rowing: Coxless four
Representing Netherlands
Olympic Games
Bronze medal – third place	1908 London	Men's coxless four

Johan Frederik Karel Hendrik Jacob Burk (born 11 May 1887 in Amsterdam – ?), later known as John Burk, was a Dutch rower who competed in the 1908 Summer Olympics.

After a four-month training period, he competed in the 1908 Summer Olympics in the coxless four event. He and the other of the team were a member of "de Amstel" and were trained by J. J. K. Ooms. The team won the bronze medal in the coxless four.

In 1910, he married Anna Helena Albertiene Schuitema in Amsterdam. In 1914, he moved to Natal, South Africa, but shortly after immigrated to the United States. He served in the U.S. Army during World War I and later worked as a clerk and bookkeeper in Brooklyn, New York. His wife died in Florida in 1957.
