= Gordon Thomson (rower) =

British rower

Gordon Lindsay Thomson
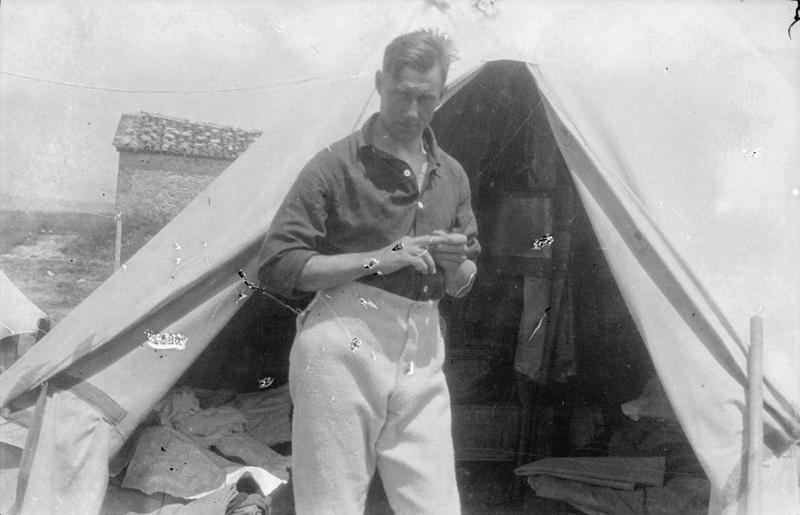
- Thomson at Tenedos, Gallipoli, June 1915, photographed by M. Knatchbull
- Born: 27 March 1884; Battersea, Surrey, England
- Died: 8 July 1953 (aged 69); Staplehurst, Kent, England
- Military career
- Allegiance: United Kingdom
- Branch: Royal Navy; Royal Air Force
- Service years: 1914–1919
- Rank: Lieutenant Colonel
- Commands: No. 207 Squadron RAF; No. 215 Squadron RAF
- Conflicts: World War I • Gallipoli Campaign • Western Front
- Awards: Distinguished Service Cross; Distinguished Flying Cross; Mention in despatches (×2)

Olympic medal record

Men's rowing

Representing Great Britain
Gold medal – first place	1908 London	Coxless pair
Silver medal – second place	1908 London	Coxless four

Gordon Lindsay Thomson DSC, DFC (27 March 1884 – 8 July 1953) was an English rower who competed in the 1908 Summer Olympics for Great Britain. During the First World War, he served as a pilot in the Royal Naval Air Service and Royal Air Force.

== Early life and rowing career ==
Thomson was born in Battersea, Surrey, the second of four children of Benjamin Thomas Lindsay Thomson and his wife Esther Florence (née Bowker). He was educated at University College School in Hampstead and Trinity Hall, Cambridge.

Thomson partnered John Fenning at stroke in the coxless pairs to win the gold medal for Great Britain rowing at the 1908 Summer Olympics. Later in the same afternoon, he and Fenning were in the Leander coxless four with Philip Filleul and Harold Barker, which won a silver medal, losing to the Magdalen College, Oxford crew.

In 1909, Thomson was a member of the Cambridge crew in the Boat Race and won his rowing blue. In 1910, he won Silver Goblets at Henley Royal Regatta partnering John Burn to beat Albertus Wielsma and Bernardus Croon. He was also a rugby player who played for UCS Old Boys, London Scottish and Surrey.

== World War I ==
At the outbreak of World War I Thomson learned to fly, being granted Royal Aero Club Aviators' Certificate No. 873 on 20 August 1914 after soloing a Bristol biplane at the Bristol School at Brooklands. He joined the Royal Naval Air Service as a probationary flight sub-lieutenant on 24 August, and was confirmed in his rank on 30 October, and posted to HMS Pembroke III.

On 1 January 1915, he was promoted to flight lieutenant, seeing active service during the Gallipoli Campaign between April 1915 and January 1916, and on 14 March 1916 received a mention in despatches from the Vice-Admiral Commanding the Eastern Mediterranean Squadron, and also the award of the Distinguished Service Cross for his low altitude photographic reconnaissance flights over enemy territory. On 30 June 1916 he was promoted to flight commander, and a year later, on 30 June 1917, to squadron commander. On 1 May 1918 Thomson was again mentioned in despatches "for zeal and devotion to duty during the period from 1 July to 31 December 1917".

On 1 April 1918, the Royal Naval Air Service was merged with the Army's Royal Flying Corps (RFC) to form the Royal Air Force, and Thomson joined the new service with the rank of captain (temporary major). (The RAF initially used the army ranks inherited from the RFC). Soon after, the former No. 7 Squadron RNAS, now No. 207 Squadron RAF, was withdrawn from France to be re-equipped with the Handley Page O/400 heavy bomber at RAF Andover. On 24 May 1918 Thomson was appointed commander of No. 207 Squadron which returned to France on 7 June to be based at Ligescourt as part of No. 54 Wing of the Independent Air Force, to mount night-bombing operations. However, his tenure was short as Thomson was promoted to the temporary rank of lieutenant colonel on 27 July, and transferred to command of No. 215 Squadron RAF.

On 2 August 1918, Thomson was awarded the Distinguished Flying Cross. His citation read:

Captain (Temporary Major) Gordon Lindsay Thomson, DSC.

"This officer has carried out 340 hours flying and has taken part in fourteen bombing raids. In one of the latter, he led his formation to destroy a bridge over a canal; he flew at a considerable altitude over the objective, watching each machine drop its bombs, and endeavoured to observe the results. After all his machines had completed the raid and departed for the lines, he glided down and passed over the bridge at 140 feet altitude. In face of very severe machine-gun fire, he crossed and re-crossed the objective in order to ascertain the results obtained. No material damage being apparent, he flew across it again at 100 feet altitude, dropping his bombs in a final attempt to destroy the bridge. He is a fine leader, and the excellent spirit in his squadron is largely due to his personal example."

Thomson left the RAF after the end of the war, being transferred to the unemployed list on 1 March 1919.

On 19 July 1919, Thomson and his brother Captain Alexander Thomson were two of the ex-servicemen of the parish who were presented with silver-mounted walking sticks in recognition of their military service from the Parish Council of Effingham, where their father was a parish councillor, as part of the Peace Day celebrations marking the signing of the Treaty of Versailles which brought the war to an end.

Thomson died at Staplehurst, Kent, at the age of 69.

== See also ==
- List of Cambridge University Boat Race crews
