= John Burn (rower) =

British rower (1884–1958)

Olympic medal record

Men's rowing
Bronze medal – third place	1908 London	Eight

John Southerden Burn (25 June 1884 – 28 August 1958) was an English medical doctor and rower who competed for Great Britain in the 1908 Summer Olympics.

Burn was born at Richmond on Thames, the son of Dr Stacey Burn and his wife Agnes Ellen Warner. His father was in practice at Richmond, and his grandfather John Southerden Burn was a solicitor and antiquary. Burn was a medical student at Cambridge University and rowed for Cambridge in the Boat Race in 1907 and 1908. The Cambridge crew made up a boat in the eights, which won the bronze medal for Great Britain rowing at the 1908 Summer Olympics. In 1910 Burn partnered Gordon Thomson to win Silver Goblets at Henley Royal Regatta beating Albertus Wielsma and Bernardus Croon in the final.

Burn completed his training at St Bartholomew's Hospital and became a House Surgeon there. During World War I, he was a temporary Captain in the RAMC. He served as Assistant Surgeon at the St John's Ambulance Brigade Hospital with the BEF. He was also anaesthetist in the War Hospital at Le Touquet France. After the war, he was in practice with his father as Burn and Burn. He was also Hon. Surgeon at the Royal Hospital, Richmond, and Hon. Anaesthetist at the Star and Garter Home, Richmond.

Burn died at Bognor Regis, Sussex at the age of 74.

Burn married Ellen La Nauze during the war and had three children.

== See also ==
- List of Cambridge University Boat Race crews
