= National Student Film Institute =

The National Student Film Institute (NSFI), formerly the Los Angeles Student Film Institute (LASFI), was founded in 1978 by Brenda Norman, Dave Master, Jutti Marsh and Ralph Rogers as a festival for films made by children from kindergarten through ninth grade. Two years later it was expanded to include the work of all high school students. The first of what became an annual festival included approximately 350 students who entered 125 films. By 1993, the Student Film Festival involved over two thousand students throughout the Los Angeles area, who together entered over 300 films. The film festival was held each year at the Directors Guild Theater in Hollywood.

As demand for workshops, advice and support for teachers grew, NSFI/L.A's Board of Directors expanded the activities of the organization to include workshops for teachers, equipment loans, and support for filmmaking programs in schools.

== Entertainment industry involvement ==
Prominent members of the film, television and animation industry came to support NSFI and its endeavors. On a corporate level involvement came from CBS, NBC, ABC, the Directors Guild, Amblin Entertainment, Warner Brothers, Universal, Lucasfilm and others. Individuals from the film, television and animation industry who would serve on the Board of Advisors (and in other capacities) were: Steve Allen, Ralph Bakshi, Ray Bradbury*, Lloyd Bridges, Charles Champlin*, Jackie Cooper*, Bill Cosby, June Foray, Sharon Gless*, Tom Hatten, Arthur Hiller*, Cal Howard, Ollie Johnston, Chuck Jones*, Fay Kanin, Kathleen Kennedy*, Walter Lantz, Jack Lemmon, Bill Littlejohn, Lynne Littman, Leonard Maltin, Delbert Mann*, Walter Matthau, Bill Melendez, Lee Mishkin, Grim Natwick*, Daphne Maxwell Reid*, Tim Reid*, Joan Rivers, George Schaefer*, Frank Thomas, Arthur Wilde and Robert Wise.

(*) indicates "Past Honorary Chairperson". Generally one person would hold the position of Honorary Chairperson each year.

== Festival Categories ==
- Grimmy Awards
- Elementary (Grades 1–6) Animation
- Elementary (Grades 1–6) Live Action
- Junior/Senior High School (Grades 7–12) 2-D Animation
- Junior/Senior High School (Grades 7–12) 3-D Animation
- Public Service Announcements
- Junior/Senior High School (Grades 7–12) Live Action
- Bill Scott Award

=== Grimmy Award ===
The Grimmy Award was an annual award given to individuals who had supported the institute and student filmmaking. Generally one "Grimmy" was awarded to a luminary within the industry and one educator. The award was named after the institute's first honorary chairperson, Grim Natwick, the creator of Betty Boop.

=== Bill Scott Award for a Good Story Well Told ===
Established in the memory of Bill Scott, a longtime advisor to the institute, the award was created to draw attention to a concern shared by Scott and the institute that writing skills were not being emphasized as much as possible. The award acknowledges "A Good Story Well Told". Four Bill Scott Awards were awarded each year from 1986 onward. The judging criteria were graduated. The four awards were awarded to the following age groups:

- Kindergarten - 2nd Grade: for a simple story: "Make an idea happen"
- 3rd - 6th Grade: "For a well-told story with a beginning, middle and end"
- 7th - 10th Grade: "For a well-told story that affects the audience emotionally"
- 11th - 12th Grade: "For a well-told story that affects the audience and tells the story in an original and personal way"

== Demise ==
By the mid-1990s, with the retirement of founder Brenda Norman and the job change of founder Dave Master, it became impractical for the institute and festival to continue and so were dissolved.
