= Oldaker =

Oldaker is a surname. Notable people with the surname include:

- Charles Oldaker (1887–1915), British gymnast
- Darren Oldaker (born 1999), English footballer
- Jamie Oldaker (1951–2020), American drummer, member of the country rock band The Tractors
- Wilfrid Oldaker (1901–1978), English clergyman and headmaster
