= Philip Filleul =

British rower

Olympic medal record

Men's rowing
Silver medal – second place	1908 London	Coxless four

Philip Rowland Filleul (15 July 1885 – 29 July 1974) was a British rower who competed in the 1908 Summer Olympics.

Filleul was born at Bath, Somerset. He was strokeman in the Leander coxless four with John Fenning, Gordon Thomson and Harold Barker which won a silver medal for Great Britain rowing at the 1908 Summer Olympics, and lost to the Magdalen College, Oxford crew.
