= Canadian International AutoShow =

Annual exhibition of automobiles in Toronto, Canada

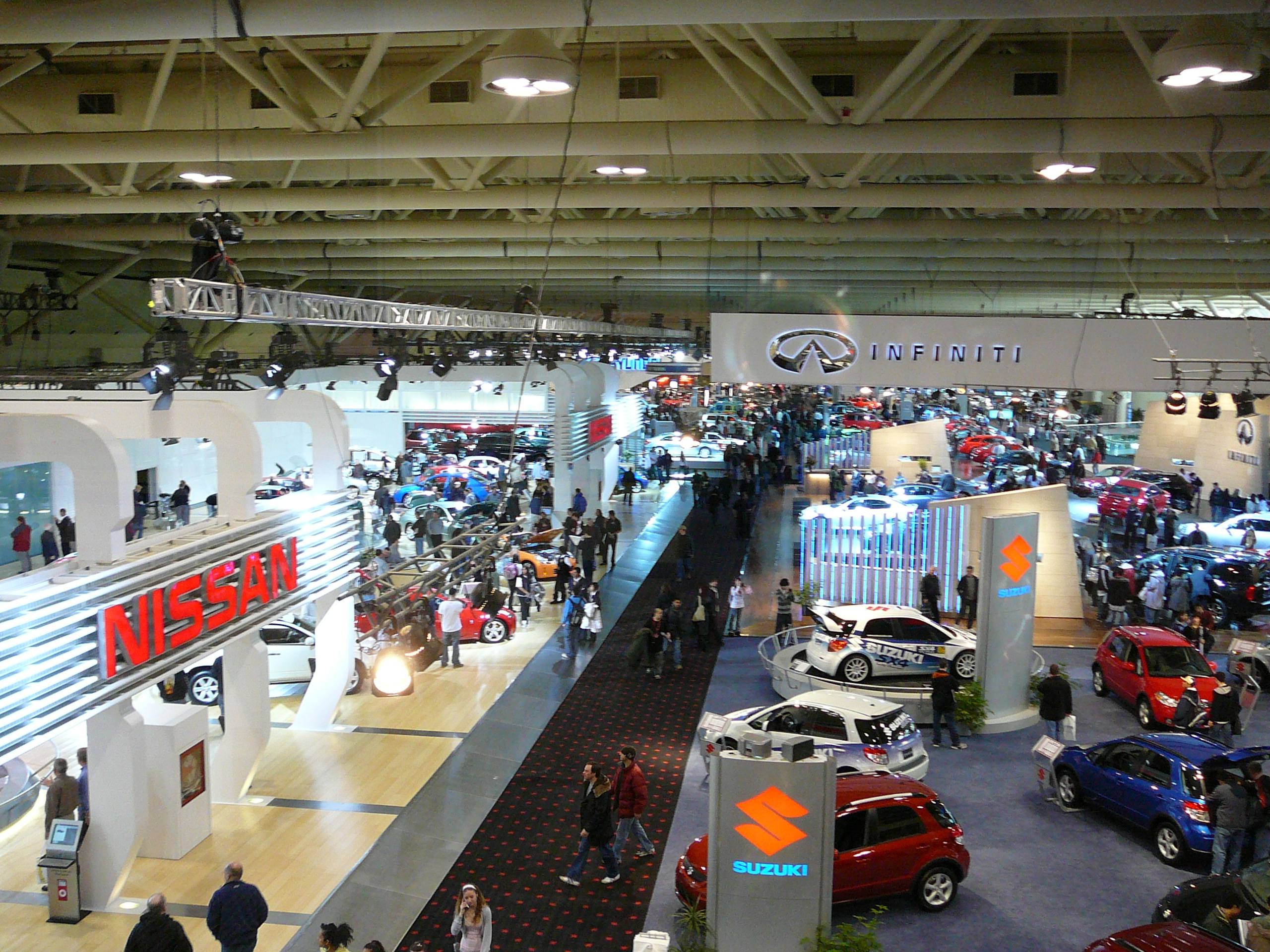
- The 2007 Canadian International AutoShow - 300 Level with Nissan, Suzuki, and Infiniti showcases visible
- Status: Active
- Genre: Auto show
- Frequency: Annually
- Venue: Metro Toronto Convention Centre
- Locations: Toronto, Ontario
- Country: Canada
- Years active: 1974–present
- Most recent: February 2026
- Next event: February 2027
- Website: www.autoshow.ca

The Canadian International AutoShow (CIAS) is Canada's largest auto show, held annually in February since 1974 in the Greater Toronto Area, Ontario. It draws an average of 300,000 visitors throughout its showing from Ontario and Western New York.

The Canadian International AutoShow exhibits over 1,000 cars, trucks, and SUVs as well as concept cars, exotics, classics, and alternative energy vehicles. It also rents booths to over 125 exhibitors promoting contests, products, services and even locally owned vehicles. The Toronto Star and Wheels.ca is the presenting Title Sponsor and Show Program Publisher of the show.

The AutoShow was founded in 1974 by the Toronto Automobile Dealers Association. Originally it was held at the International Centre in Mississauga. Since 1986 it is held at the Metro Toronto Convention Centre in downtown Toronto. The event replaced the National Motor Show, which had been held until 1967 at the Exhibition Place's Automotive Building during the Canadian National Exhibition in the summer.

The 2021 and 2022 editions of the event were cancelled due to the COVID-19 pandemic.

The 2024 edition of the show highlighted electric vehicles, with an "Electric City" exhibit space, and indoor test track and outside test drives available. It was attended by 371,559 attendees, which was a record for attendance. 45 car companies displayed vehicles at the show.
