= Robert Davies (sport shooter) =

British sports shooter

Personal information
- Born: 10 December 1876 London, England
- Died: 9 September 1916 (aged 39) Somme, France

Sport
- Sport: Sports shooting

Robert Davies (10 December 1876 – 9 September 1916) was a British sports shooter. He competed in two events at the 1912 Summer Olympics. He was killed in action during World War I.

== See also ==
- List of Olympians killed in World War I
