= John Fenning =

British rower

Olympic medal record

Men's rowing
Gold medal – first place	1908 London	Coxless pair
Silver medal – second place	1908 London	Coxless four

John Reginald Keith Fenning (23 June 1885 – 3 January 1955) was a British medical doctor and rower who competed in the 1908 Summer Olympics.

Fenning was born in Fulham, London. He entered London Hospital Medical College in January 1904, but it took him thirteen years to complete his course. He became a rower for Leander Club. He partnered Gordon Thomson at bow in the coxless pairs to win the gold medal for Great Britain rowing at the 1908 Summer Olympics. Later in the same afternoon, he and Thomson were in the Leander coxless four with Philip Filleul and Harold Barker, which won a silver medal, losing to the Magdalen College, Oxford crew.

After he qualified in 1927, Fenning initially practiced in the Home Counties, but in 1937, he moved to the Midlands. Fenning died at Coventry at the age of 69.
