= Philip Verdon =

British rower

Olympic medal record

Men's rowing
Silver medal – second place	1908 London	Coxless pair

Philip Verdon (22 February 1886 – 18 June 1960) was a British rower who competed in the 1908 Summer Olympics. Born in Brixton, London, he was educated at Westminster School London, then at Jesus College, Cambridge. As the strokeman in the coxless pair with George Fairbairn, he won a silver medal in rowing at the 1908 Summer Olympics.
