= John Somers-Smith =

British rower

Olympic medal record

Men's rowing
Gold medal – first place	1908 London	Coxless four

John Robert Somers-Smith MC (15 December 1887 – 1 July 1916) was an English rower who competed in the 1908 Summer Olympics. He was killed in action during the First World War.

Somers-Smith was born at Walton-on-Thames, Surrey, the son of Robert Vernon Somers-Smith and his wife Gertrude. His father ran for Oxford against Cambridge in 1868 and 1869 and was twice the AAA half-mile champion. Somers-Smith was educated at Eton College, where he was 'Captain of the Boats', and Magdalen College, University of Oxford, where he rowed for his college. Although he did not row for Oxford, his brother, Richard Somers-Smith, took part in the Boat Race in 1904 and 1905. The Magdalen College Coxless four that John rowed with won the Wyfold Challenge Cup and the Visitors' Challenge Cup in 1907, with another double win in the Stewards' and the Visitors' at the Henley Royal Regatta in 1908, and was selected to represent Great Britain in rowing at the 1908 Summer Olympics, Somers-Smith was stroke of the four along with Collier Cudmore, James Angus Gillan and Duncan Mackinnon. This crew won the gold medal for Great Britain, defeating another GB Leander crew, and crews from Canada and the Netherlands.

Somers-Smith had been elected a member of Leander Club in 1906 after winning the Ladies' Challenge Plate with Eton College, but at no time did he ever represent Leander on the water. He subsequently became a lawyer by profession.

Somers-Smith served with the 5th London Regiment (London Rifle Brigade), part of the Territorial Force of the British Army during the First World War, and was awarded the Military Cross for gallantry in action as a captain in 1915 at the 2nd Battle of Ypres. He fell in action at the opening of the Battle of the Somme offensive on 1 July 1916, aged 28, during the assault by the 56th (London) Division at Gommecourt. His body was not recovered from the field, and his name is engraved on the gateway for the missing of the Somme at Thiepval.

== See also ==
- List of Olympians killed in World War I
