= Ronald Sanderson =

English rower (1876–1918)

Medal record

Men's rowing

Representing Great Britain

Olympic Games
Gold medal – first place	1908 London	Eight

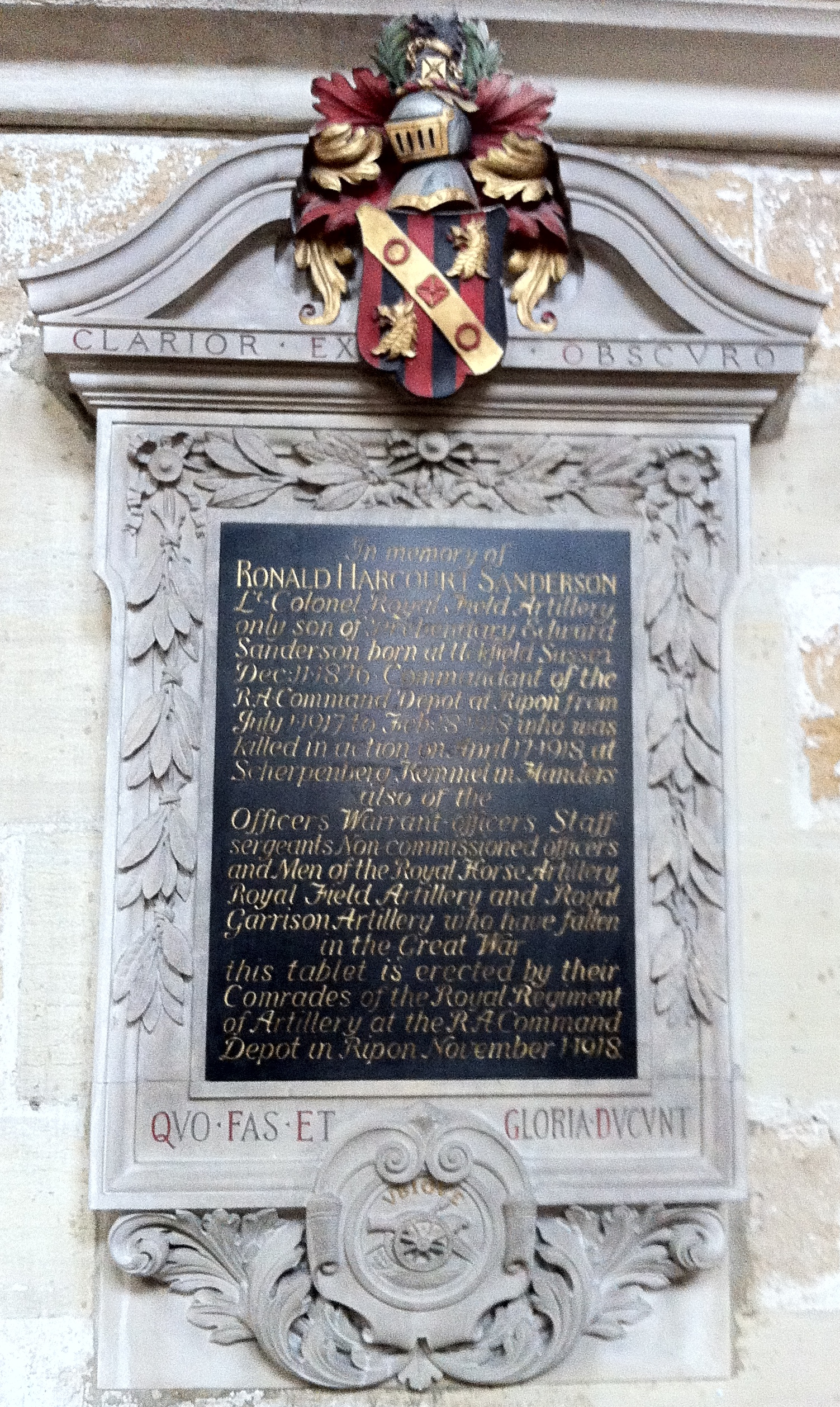
Memorial to Ronald Harcourt Sanderson in Ripon Cathedral

Lieutenant Colonel Ronald Harcourt Sanderson (11 December 1876 – 17 April 1918) was an English rower who competed in the 1908 Summer Olympics for Great Britain. He was killed in action during the First World War.

== Early life and rowing career ==
Sanderson was born at Uckfield, Sussex, the only son of Rev. Edward Sanderson of Uckfield. He was educated at Harrow School and Trinity College, Cambridge. Sanderson rowed for Cambridge in the Boat Race in 1899 and 1900 which were two victories for Cambridge.

He became a member of Leander Club and was a crew member of the Leander eight, which won the gold medal for Great Britain rowing at the 1908 Summer Olympics.

== Military career ==
Sanderson joined the Royal Horse Artillery in May 1900, and served as Second Lieutenant in the Second Boer War in South Africa. He was promoted to lieutenant on 8 March 1902.

Sanderson served in the Royal Field Artillery during the First World War. He was mentioned in despatches and was awarded the Chevalier, Legion of Honour by France. He was a lieutenant colonel when he was killed in action near Ypres in April 1918, aged 41. He was buried at Lijssenthoek Military Cemetery nearby and there is a memorial brass in Ripon Cathedral.

== See also ==
- List of Olympians killed in World War I
- List of Cambridge University Boat Race crews
