= Erik Bye (baritone) =

Norwegian opera singer and rower

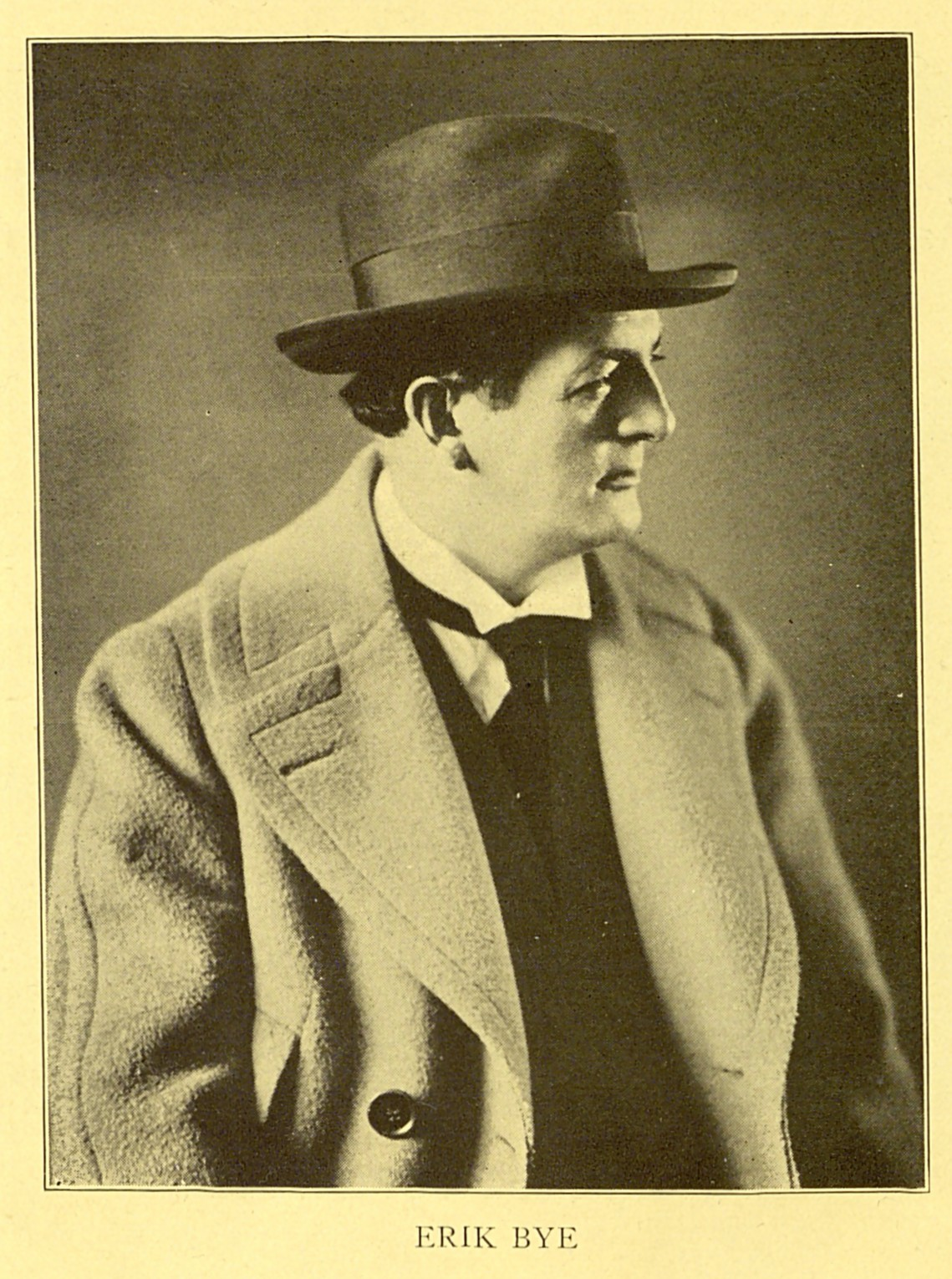
- Bye in c. 1920

Personal information
- Birth name: Erik Ole Bye
- Nationality: Norwegian
- Born: 20 March 1883; Drammen, Norway
- Died: 17 May 1953 (aged 70); Oslo, Norway

Sport
- Sport: Rowing

Erik Ole Bye (20 March 1883 – 17 May 1953) was a Norwegian operatic baritone. He studied singing with Morgenstierne in Oslo, zur Muhlen in London, and R. Willani in Paris. He also competed at the Olympics as a rower.

== Biography ==
He competed in the men's eight event at the 1908 Summer Olympics.

He made his professional opera debut in 1913 at the National Theatre in Oslo as Don Basilio in Gioachino Rossini's The Barber of Seville. From 1914 to 1917, he was a member of the Breslau Opera House; making his debut there as Amonasro in Giuseppe Verdi's Aida. In 1917 he sang with the Opéra-Comique in Paris. In November 1918, he sang the role of the High Priest in Camille Saint-Saëns's Samson and Delilah for the opening of the new opera house in Oslo. From 1921–1932 he was primarily active with opera companies and orchestras in North America. He returned to Norway in 1932, where he continued to perform and worked as a businessman. He made recordings for Columbia Records, His Master's Voice, and the Victor Talking Machine Company. His son, Erik Bye, was a prominent Norwegian journalist and singer.
