= Rowing at the 1908 Summer Olympics – Men's coxless pair =

Rowing at the Olympics

Men's coxless pairs at the Games of the IV Olympiad
- Venue: River Thames
- Dates: 28–31 July 1908
- Competitors: 8 from 3 nations

Medalists
1st place, gold medalist(s)		John Fenning, Gordon Thomson; Great Britain
2nd place, silver medalist(s)		George Fairbairn, Philip Verdon; Great Britain
3rd place, bronze medalist(s)		Norway Jackes, Frederick Toms; Canada
3rd place, bronze medalist(s)		Martin Stahnke, Willy Düskow; Germany

The men's coxless pairs was one of four rowing events on the Rowing at the 1908 Summer Olympics programme. Nations could enter up to 2 boats (total of 4 rowers). Four pairs from three nations competed.

== Competition format ==
The 1908 tournament featured two rounds of one-on-one races; with 4 boats in the competition, the semifinals were the first round. Semifinal losers each received bronze medals, so that all competitors earned a medal. The course was 1.5 miles in length, with two slight bends near the start and about halfway.

== Standings ==
Place	Bow	Stroke	Nation
1	John Fenning	Gordon Thomson	Great Britain
2	George Fairbairn	Philip Verdon	Great Britain
3	Frederick Toms	Norway Jackes	Canada
3	Martin Stahnke	Willy Düskow	Germany

== Results ==
=== Semifinals ===
==== Semifinal 1 ====
Place	Bow	Stroke	Nation	Time
1	John Fenning	Gordon Thomson	Great Britain	9:46.0
2	Frederick Toms	Norway Jackes	Canada	Unknown

==== Semifinal 2 ====
Place	Bow	Stroke	Nation	Time
1	George Fairbairn	Philip Verdon	Great Britain	11:05.0
2	Martin Stahnke	Willy Düskow	Germany	Unknown

=== Final ===
Place	Bow	Stroke	Nation	Time
1	John Fenning	Gordon Thomson	Great Britain	9:41.0
2	George Fairbairn	Philip Verdon	Great Britain	Unknown

== Sources ==
- Cook, Theodore Andrea (1908). The Fourth Olympiad, Being the Official Report. London: British Olympic Association.
- De Wael, Herman (2001). "Rowing 1908". Herman's Full Olympians.
