= Charles Champlin =

American film critic and writer (1926–2014)

- Born: Charles Davenport Champlin; March 23, 1926; Hammondsport, New York, U.S.
- Died: November 16, 2014 (aged 88); Los Angeles, California, U.S.
- Resting place: Holy Cross Catholic Cemetery
- Education: Harvard University
- Occupation: Film critic

Charles Davenport Champlin (March 23, 1926 – November 16, 2014) was an American film critic and writer.

== Life and career ==
Champlin was born in Hammondsport, New York. He attended high school in Camden, New York, working as a columnist for the Camden Advance-Journal and editor Florence Stone. His family has been active in the wine industry in upstate New York since 1855. He served in the infantry in Europe in World War II and was awarded the Purple Heart and battle stars. He graduated from Harvard University in 1948 and joined Life magazine.

Champlin was a writer and correspondent for Life and Time magazine for seventeen years, and was a member of the Overseas Press Club. He joined the Los Angeles Times as entertainment editor and columnist in 1965, was its principal film critic from 1967 to 1980, and wrote book reviews and a regular column titled "Critic at Large". He co-founded the Los Angeles Film Critics Association, and was a board member of the American Cinematheque.

Champlin's television career began in 1971 when he hosted Film Odyssey on PBS, introducing classic films and interviewing major directors. That same year, he hosted a live music series, Homewood, for KCET, the Los Angeles PBS station. For six years he co-hosted a public affairs program, Citywatchers, on KCET with columnist Art Seidenbaum. He interviewed hundreds of film personalities, first on the Z Channel's On the Film Scene in Los Angeles, then with Champlin on Film on Bravo.

Champlin taught film criticism at Loyola Marymount University from 1969 to 1985, was adjunct professor of film at USC from 1985 to 1996, and also taught at UC Irvine and the AFI Conservatory. He also wrote many books, including his biographies Back There Where The Past Was (1989) and A Life in Writing (2006).

In 1980, Champlin was on the jury of the feature film competition at that year's Cannes Film Festival, serving alongside the likes of Kirk Douglas, Ken Adam and Leslie Caron. Twelve years later, in 1992, he was a member of the jury at the 42nd Berlin International Film Festival and served on the advisory board of the Los Angeles Student Film Institute.

In his later years, starting in the late 1990s, Champlin had macular degeneration, and in 2001 wrote My Friend, You Are Legally Blind, a memoir about his struggle with the disease. He died on November 16, 2014, aged 88, suffering from Alzheimer's disease.

== Published works ==
- The Flicks: Or, Whatever Became of Andy Hardy. 1977, ISBN 0-378-06164-X
- The Movies Grow Up: 1940–1980. 1982, ISBN 0-8040-0363-7
- George Lucas: The Creative Impulse. Lucasfilm's First Twenty Years. 1992, ISBN 0-8109-3564-3
- John Frankenheimer: A Conversation With Charles Champlin. 1995, ISBN 1-880756-09-9
- Hollywood's Revolutionary Decade: Charles Champlin Reviews the Movies of the 1970s. 1998, ISBN 1-880284-26-X
- Back There Where the Past Was: A Small-Town Boyhood. 1999, ISBN 0-8156-0612-5 (Foreword by Ray Bradbury)
- My Friend, You Are Legally Blind: A Writer's Struggle with Macular Degeneration. 2001, ISBN 1-880284-48-0
- A Life in Writing: The Story of an American Journalist. 2006, ISBN 0-8156-0847-0
