= Rowing at the 1908 Summer Olympics – Men's eight =

Men's eight at the Games of the IV Olympiad
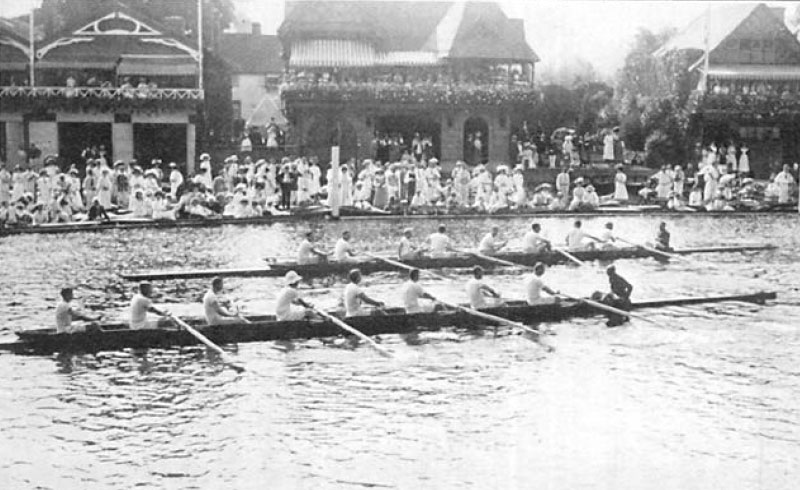
- Quarterfinal 2: Leander (on the outside) vs. Hungary
- Venue: River Thames
- Dates: 29–31 July 1908
- Competitors: 54 from 5 nations
- Winning time: 7:52.0

Medalists
1st place, gold medalist(s)		Leander Club; Great Britain
2nd place, silver medalist(s)		Royal Club Nautique de Gand; Belgium
3rd place, bronze medalist(s)		Argonaut Rowing Club; Canada
3rd place, bronze medalist(s)		Cambridge University Boat Club; Great Britain

The men's eight was one of four rowing events on the Rowing at the 1908 Summer Olympics programme. Nations could enter up to two boats (total of 16 rowers and 2 coxswains). Six boats from five nations competed. The event was won by Leander Club, one of the two British boats. The silver medal went to the Belgian team from Royal Club Nautique de Gand. Bronze medals were awarded to the two semifinal losers; Argonaut Rowing Club of Canada had been defeated by Leander while Britain's second boat, from Cambridge University Boat Club, lost to the Belgians.

== Background ==
This was the third appearance of the event. Rowing had been on the programme in 1896 but was cancelled due to bad weather. The men's eight has been held every time that rowing has been contested, beginning in 1900.

The top eight team in the world at the time was Belgium's Royal Club Nautique de Gand, winners of the European championship in 1906, 1907, and 1908 as well as the Henley Grand Challenge Cup in 1906 and 1907. Their primary challenger in London was the host nation's Leander Club, winners of the Grand Challenge Cup in 1903, 1904, and 1905. Significant absences were the American Vesper Boat Club, the two-time reigning Olympic champions, and Great Britain's Christ Church College Boat Club, the 1908 Grand Challenge Cup victors.

Great Britain, Hungary, and Norway each made their debut in the event. Belgium and Canada each made their second appearance, matching the absent United States for most among nations.

=== Starting list ===
The following boats and/or rowing clubs participated:

- Belgium Royal Club Nautique de Gand (colours: red, yellow and black; red and white oars)
- Canada Argonaut Rowing Club (colours: light and dark blue)
- Great Britain Cambridge University Boat Club (colours: light blue)
- Great Britain Leander Club (colours: cerise)
- Hungary Pannónia Evezős Egylet/Magyar Evezős Szövetség (colours: red, white and green)
- Norway Norges Roforbund (colours: red, white and blue)

== Competition format ==
The "eight" event featured nine-person boats, with eight rowers and a coxswain. It was a sweep rowing event, with the rowers each having one oar (and thus each rowing on one side). The course was 1.5 miles in length, with two slight bends near the start and about halfway.

The 1908 tournament featured three rounds of one-on-one races; with 6 boats in the competition, 2 boats received byes into the semifinals and there were two races in the quarterfinal round. Semifinal losers each received bronze medals.

== Schedule ==
Date	Time	Round
Wednesday, 29 July 1908	13:00; 15:20	Quarterfinals
Thursday, 30 July 1908	13:15; 15:45	Semifinals
Friday, 31 July 1908	15:15	Final

== Results ==
=== Quarterfinals ===
All heats were held on Wednesday, 29 July.

==== Quarterfinal 1 ====
Both started at 39 with a good following wind which blew slightly off the bushes at the start. Canada led at once and kept a fast stroke going for longer than Norway, which resulted in their getting nearly two lengths by halfway; Norway made tremendous efforts from this point, but their strength and courage did not produce an equivalent in pace, and the Argonauts won by two and three quarter lengths.

— Official Report, p. 245.

Rank	Boat	Nation	Bow	Rowers	Stroke	Coxswain	Time	Notes
1	Argonaut Rowing Club	Canada	Irvine Robertson	Joseph Wright; Julius Thomson; Walter Lewis; Gordon Balfour; Becher Gale; Charles Riddy	Geoffrey Taylor	Douglas Kertland	8:06.0	Q
2	Norges Roforbund	Norway	Otto Krogh	Erik Bye; Ambrosius Høyer; Gustav Hæhre; Emil Irgens; Hannibal Fegth; Wilhelm Hansen	Annan Knudsen	Ejnar Tønsager	8:16.7	

==== Quarterfinal 2 ====
The English crew started at 41 to their visitors' 40 and led after the first ten strokes, but on reaching Remenham they were able to drop to 34 and still be two lengths ahead at halfway. Hungary never relaxed their efforts, but went after the leaders with the greatest determination. The gap, however, was never reduced, and Leander, rowing beautifully together with a reserve of power and pace that was most exhilarating to observe, won by about two lengths without extending themselves.

— Official Report, p. 245.

Rank	Boat	Nation	Bow	Rowers	Stroke	Coxswain	Time	Notes
1	Leander Club	Great Britain	Albert Gladstone	Frederick Kelly; Banner Johnstone; Guy Nickalls; Charles Burnell; Ronald Sanderson; Raymond Etherington-Smith	Henry Bucknall	Gilchrist Maclagan	8:10.0	Q
2	Pannónia/Magyar	Hungary	Sándor Kleckner	Lajos Haraszthy; Antal Szebeny; Róbert Éder; Sándor Hautzinger; Jenő Várady; Imre Wampetich	Ferenc Kirchknopf	Kálmán Vaskó	8:15.7	

=== Semifinals ===
Both semifinals were held on Thursday, 30 July.

==== Semifinal 1 ====
The Canadians started at 43 to Leander's 40, but were beaten for speed by the top of the island and were one and a quarter lengths behind at halfway. The home team were never allowed to take it too easily, though they were usually able to stall off all the plucky efforts made by the Argonauts, who kept on rushing at them, their stroke's spurts being splendidly backed up by his crew who worked like Trojans to the finish, and that last spurt on the Berkshire shore will not easily be forgotten as an example of indomitable courage against a much superior crew, as Leander won by a length.

— Official Report, pp. 245–46.

Rank	Boat	Nation	Bow	Rowers	Stroke	Coxswain	Time	Notes
1	Leander Club	Great Britain	Albert Gladstone	Frederick Kelly; Banner Johnstone; Guy Nickalls; Charles Burnell; Ronald Sanderson; Raymond Etherington-Smith	Henry Bucknall	Gilchrist Maclagan	8:12.0	Q
3rd place, bronze medalist(s)	Argonaut Rowing Club	Canada	Irvine Robertson	Joseph Wright; Julius Thomson; Walter Lewis; Gordon Balfour; Becher Gale; Charles Riddy	Geoffrey Taylor	Douglas Kertland	8:14.9	

==== Semifinal 2 ====
Any advantage which the Belgians may have had from the slight bend in their favour in the first part of the course was counterbalanced by the wind off the bushes. They started at 43, but Cambridge University were faster at 40, and both boats went dead level all up the island. They still fought for the lead the whole way to Remenham, where the Belgian canvas was a few inches in front. Here the English faltered a trifle, but Douglas Stuart and John Burn pulled them together again, and Cambridge were soon going great guns and racing splendidly. But the Belgian crew was the more perfectly together, and therefore managed to get a lead of about 20 feet at halfway and to increase it afterwards, for they were not so exhausted by their previous efforts as the Cambridge crew, who showed unmistakable signs of staleness, and in a short time began to go to pieces. There was clear water between the boats after a mile and a quarter had been rowed, and here Stuart's spurt took the last ounce out of his men, who worked with great determination, but were no longer rowing together. The result was that when the strain came the crew disintegrated, but they never stopped shoving till the flag fell. The Belgians won by a length and a third.

— Official Report, p. 246.

This race was the only rowing heat in which a British boat was defeated by a visiting nation. In each of the other three events, the two British boats won both semifinals.

Rank	Boat	Nation	Bow	Rowers	Stroke	Coxswain	Time	Notes
1	Royal Club Nautique de Gand	Belgium	Oscar Taelman	Marcel Morimont; Rémy Orban; Georges Mys; François Vergucht; Polydore Veirman; Oscar de Somville	Rodolphe Poma	Alfred Van Landeghem	8:22.0	Q
3rd place, bronze medalist(s)	Cambridge University Boat Club	Great Britain	Frank Jerwood	Eric Powell; Oswald Carver; Edward Williams; Henry Goldsmith; Harold Kitching; John Burn	Douglas Stuart	Richard Boyle	8:25.9	

=== Final ===
The final was held on Friday, 31 July.

[T]he Belgians started at their full pace and perfectly together, rowing 12, 23, and 43. Leander, showing beautiful precision and great power, went off at 11, 22, and 42. ... Only, however, by about six inches did the English crew keep ahead until they had passed the island, up which both eights went at a tremendous pace and nearly dead level. But Leander were gaining about an inch at every stroke, and by the first signal they had half a length in hand. Belgium ... spurted suddenly at about half a mile from the start. Leander answered them at once in no uncertain fashion, and Bucknall's timely quicken brought his men three-quarters of a length ahead at halfway, which the leaders passed in 3 min. 45 sec. Once more the Belgian stroke made a great effort, and his men responded gamely, but it took too much out of them. They had faltered once before, and recovered themselves with the greatest courage. This time they rolled badly, and for a moment seemed to go to pieces. Like a flash the English crew went away from them, and, with a quarter of a length clear water between the boats, at last Leander were able for the first time to take a much-needed "breather" at a long and hard 35, which they rowed in very good style all through. ... [The Belgians] spurted again and again as they neared the grand stand, but human nature could do no more.

— Official Report, pp. 247–48.

Leander pulled away again, eventually winning by two lengths in a time of 7 min. 52 sec.

Rank	Boat	Nation	Bow	Rowers	Stroke	Coxswain	Time
1st place, gold medalist(s)	Leander Club	Great Britain	Albert Gladstone	Frederick Kelly; Banner Johnstone; Guy Nickalls; Charles Burnell; Ronald Sanderson; Raymond Etherington-Smith	Henry Bucknall	Gilchrist Maclagan	7:52.0
2nd place, silver medalist(s)	Royal Club Nautique de Gand	Belgium	Oscar Taelman	Marcel Morimont; Rémy Orban; Georges Mys; François Vergucht; Polydore Veirman; Oscar de Somville	Rodolphe Poma	Alfred Van Landeghem	7:57.5

== Sources ==
- Cook, Theodore Andrea (1908). The Fourth Olympiad, Being the Official Report. London: British Olympic Association.
- De Wael, Herman (2001). "Rowing 1908". Herman's Full Olympians.
