= Automotive Building =

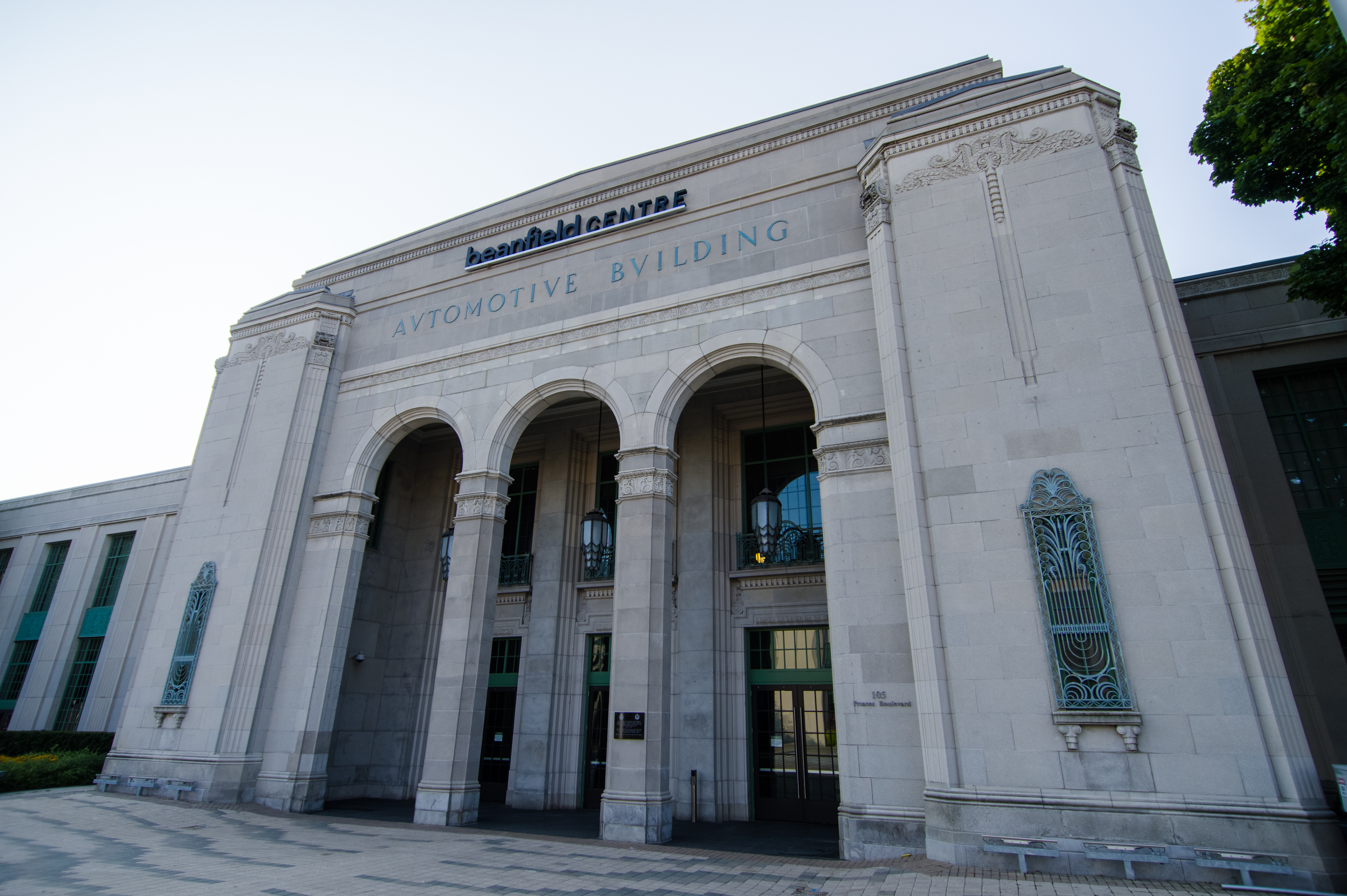
- Main entrance to the building in 2017

General information
- Type: Exhibition building
- Architectural style: Art Deco
- Location: Exhibition Place, 105 Princes' Blvd, Toronto, Ontario, Canada
- Coordinates: 43.63381°N 79.41057°W
- Current tenants: Beanfield Centre, formerly Allstream Centre
- Construction started: April 1929
- Opened: August 26, 1929
- Cost: CA$1,000,299.26 (equivalent to $17,853,167 in 2025)
- Renovation cost: CA$47 million
- Owner: City of Toronto

Technical details
- Structural system: Steel truss
- Floor count: 1 and mezzanine

Design and construction
- Architect: D. E. Kertland
- Main contractor: Jackson, Lewis Company

Renovating team
- Architects: David Clusaiu, principal architect
- Renovating firm: NORR Limited, Architects & Engineers

Website
- beanfieldcentre.com

The Automotive Building is a heritage building at Exhibition Place in Toronto, Ontario, Canada, containing event and conference space. In the 1920s, as a result of burgeoning interest in automobiles, additional exhibition space for automotive exhibits during the annual Canadian National Exhibition (CNE) was needed. A design competition was held, and the winning design was submitted by Toronto architect Douglas Kertland. The building opened in 1929, and the "National Motor Show" exhibit of automobiles was held in the building until 1967. It was also used for trade shows. When it opened, it was claimed to be "the largest structure in North America designed exclusively to display passenger vehicles". During World War II, the building was used by the Royal Canadian Navy and named HMCS York. After the end of automotive exhibits at the CNE, the building was used for other CNE exhibits and continued to be used for trade shows.

In the 2000s, Toronto City Council decided to convert the facility into a conference centre complementary to the National Trade Centre (now the Enercare Centre) across the street. The building was renovated, constructing a ballroom in the main exhibit hall and conference rooms on the mezzanine level. The ballroom is considered the largest in Toronto. No longer used by the CNE or trade shows, the building is used year-round for various public and private events and conferences. The CNE has twice sold the naming rights to the convention facility. In 2009, it was named the Allstream Centre and since March 2017 has been known as the Beanfield Centre. The current logo and signage reflects those agreements.

== Description ==
The Automotive Building is a two-storey Art Deco building, 160,000 square feet (15,000 m^{2}) in size. The internal plan is a large open space, with a mezzanine on the second floor surrounding the main floor.

The structure's base is stone from a quarry near Queenston Heights, Ontario, with "artificial stone" up top. Sticking to all-Canadian material and workmanship added to the cost: using Indiana stone would have cost $989,299. The architect and general contractors noted that, while Queenston stone could be used throughout for an additional cost of $35,000, it would take too long for the shops to prepare the stone. The tender required the winner to pay "a minimum of 50 cents an hour for all men employed on the building."

The building now houses the Beanfield Centre conference centre, and it is connected underground to the underground parking garage of the Enercare Centre. The open floor was converted to a 43,900 square feet (4,080 m^{2}) ballroom, claimed to be largest in Toronto, which can be sub-divided in two. The original glass roof over the open floor was replaced with a new ceiling. The second floor mezzanine saw the addition of 20 meeting rooms.

== Construction ==
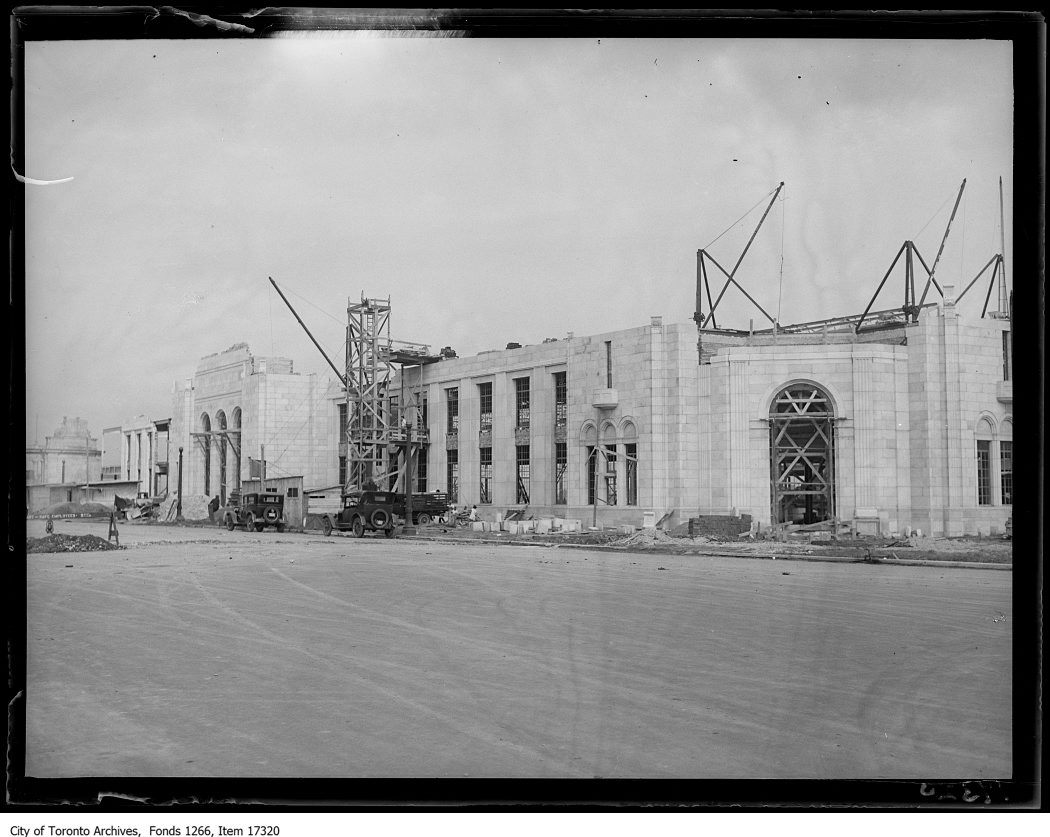
View of the construction of the Automotive Building from the north, July 1929

Motor cars were first exhibited at the Canadian National Exhibition in 1897. In 1902, the CNE built the Transportation Building, where cars were displayed alongside streetcars, railway exhibits and carriages. Early automobiles on display included models from Autocar, Packard, Peerless, Stevens-Duryea and Thomas. The building was destroyed by fire and was replaced with a new building in 1909. By 1911, there were no longer any horse-drawn vehicles on display. The display was named the National Motor Show in 1916.

As of 1928, the vehicles (including coupes, trucks, limousines, and buses) at the National Motor Show were overflowing into the Coliseum "and other places," including the Electrical Building. Visitors to the fair were noted to be increasingly coming by car, suggesting that every "state in the union is likely to be represented in the array of motor car markers on the grounds," and that it was "no new thing to see British Columbia and Alberta markers on the grounds." Officials had spots narrowed by roughly a foot, to increase capacity, and introduced parking attendants.

The crowd that throngs this building daily and nightly attest to the popularity of the motor car. Even those who cannot buy go to see. On Saturday night the building was jammed to capacity. It is one of the best people-pullers in the park.

— anonymous writer, The Daily Star

A 1928 Daily Star article published in the afternoon edition on Highways and Automotive Day pegged the total value of automobiles on display at over a million dollars. The CNE directors held a luncheon hosting "leaders in the automotive world". Speakers included the general manager of Canadian Goodyear Rubber Co. C. H. Carlisle, and Dr. P. E. Doolittle, "well-known pathfinder" and president of the Canadian Automobile Association. As a result of the popularity, there was talk of building a new automotive building, perhaps even in time for the next fair. The CNE President noted he'd meet with members of the industry and civic authorities on the proposal. The Globe noted that "sympathetic consideration of this exists in the minds of the City Council," noting the increase in overcrowding every year, but still was cautious about chances.

A design contest was announced in later October 1928 and launched in early November, with the purpose of starting work in the winter so that the building would be complete in time for the 1929 CNE. The contest received thirty potential designs for the structure. The winner, was local architect Douglas Kertland, apparently winning by a slim point margin, was announced December 12, 1928. Charles B. Dolphin won second place, and Mathers & Haldenby third. Deemed the "most elaborate automotive building in the world", the CNEA withheld the design until they could adjust the interior.

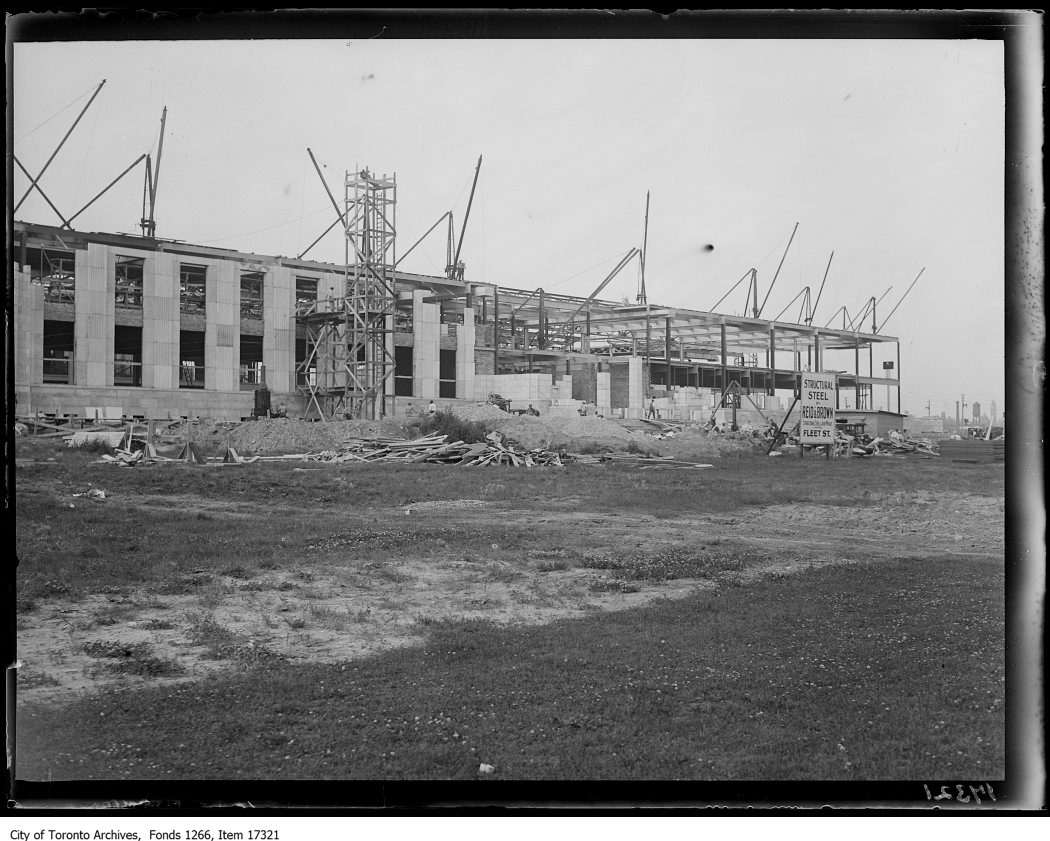
View of the Automotive Building from the south, July 1929

It was to be built "immediately south" of the Electrical & Engineering Building. Cost was estimated at $1 million upon announcement, tendered at $1,000,299.26, and $1,000,299 upon the beginning of construction. Interior dimensions were set at 445 feet (136 m) long by 292 feet (89 m). The main storey was to offer 940,980 square feet (87,420 m^{2}) of exhibition area, and the mezzanine floor 34,000 square feet (3,200 m^{2}). This was twice the area of the Electrical Building. It was to feature "modern lighting of the indirect type." It was to include a "public dining-room of sumptuous appointments." Decorative iron work was to be used throughout.

Construction work was underway as of early April 1929. The Globe noted there was "no pomp or ceremony" to mark the start. The cornerstone was laid June 12, 1929 by Sam Harris, VP, with invocation by Reverend F. C. Ward-Whate. The building was opened August 26, 1929 by Ontario Premier Howard Ferguson.

== History ==
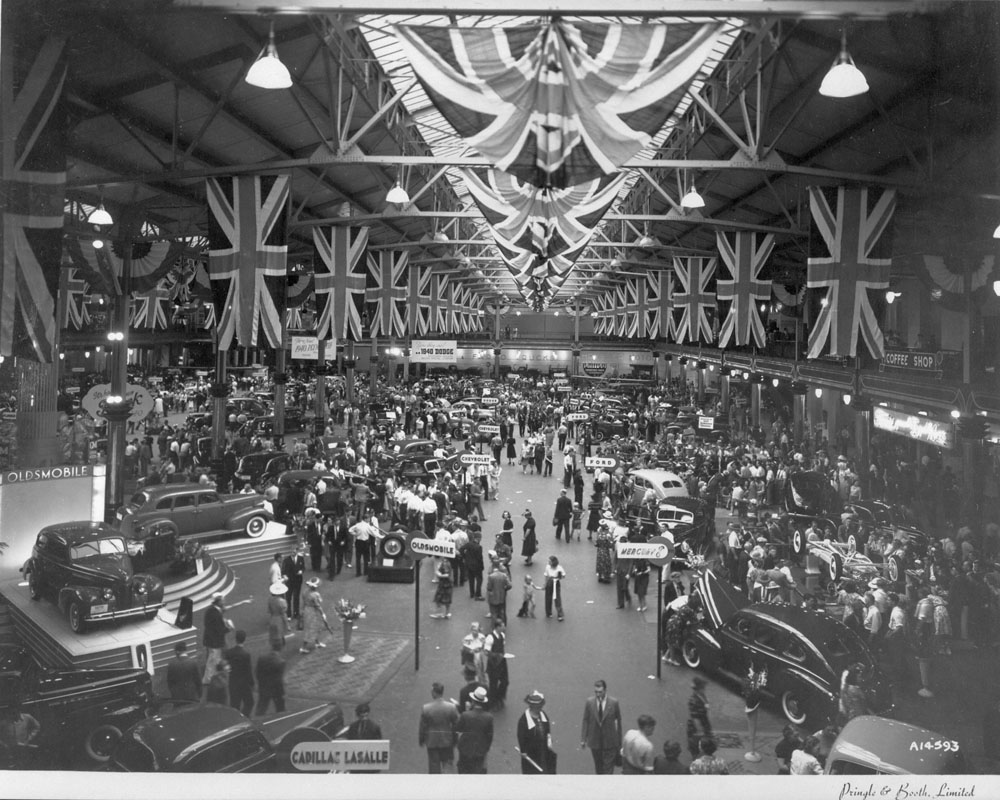
The 1939 National Motor Show, held inside the Automotive Building

The building was initially used to display the latest car models to the public. The National Motor Show was last held in 1967. In 1974, the Canadian International AutoShow appeared elsewhere in the city during the spring, closer in time to when new car models appear than in late August when the CNE starts.

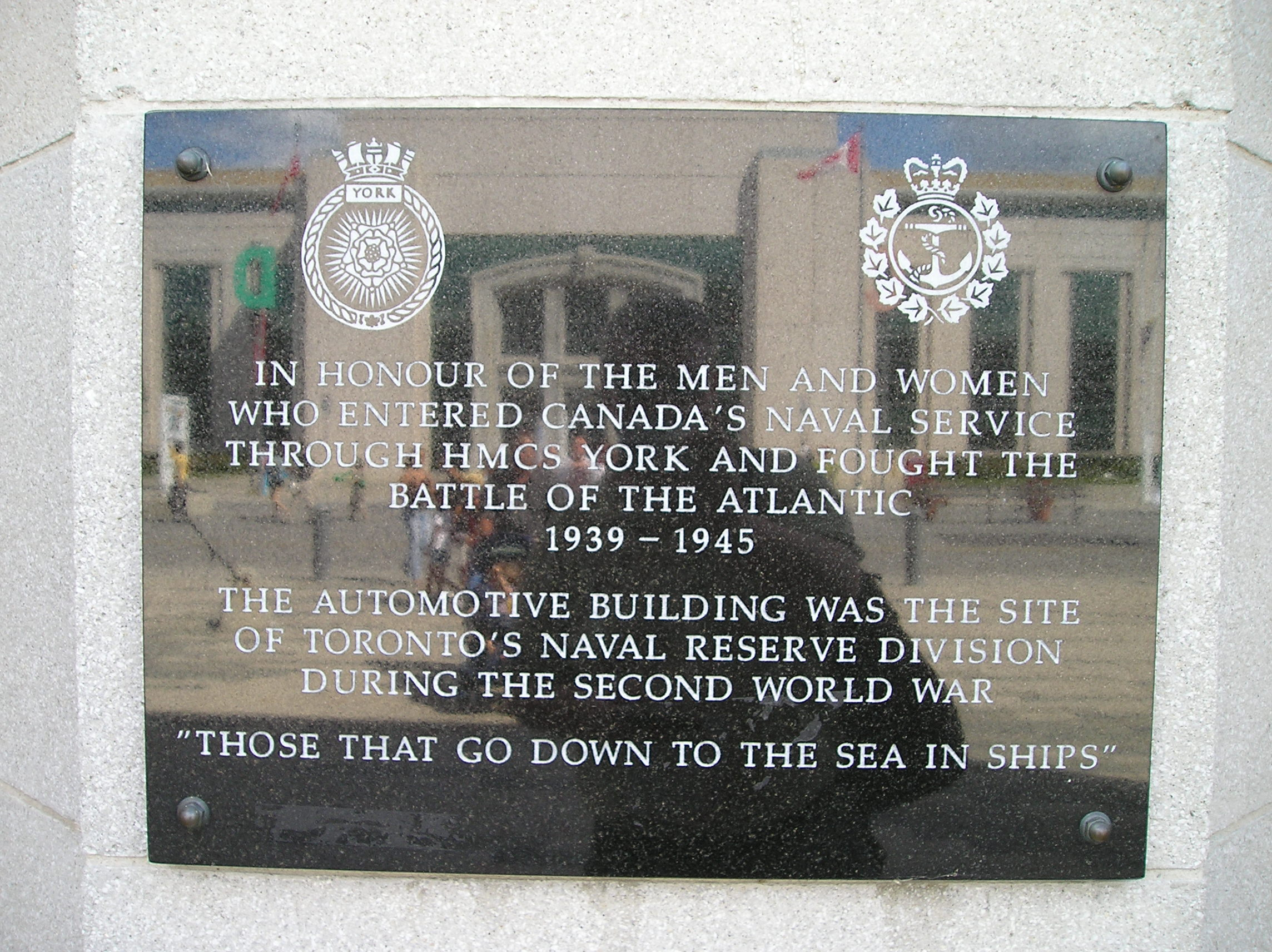
A plaque outside the Automotive Building denoting the site as the former location of HMCS York

During World War II, this building was the home to Toronto's naval reserve, known as HMCS York. A commemorative plaque to this can be found on the north side of the building. In 1949, Maple Leaf Gardens builder and Toronto Maple Leafs owner Conn Smythe proposed converting the building into four ice arenas.

In 1988, the building was designated a "listed" heritage structure. In 1999, a study of the-then Direct Energy Centre determined that it had a lack of meeting space compared to other similar facilities in North America. In 2004, the CNE and City of Toronto approved a CA$47 million renovation of the Automotive Building so that it would provide the meeting space. It re-opened in 2009 as the Allstream Centre. Since 2009, the building has been used exclusively for meetings, events and conferences. In 2017, a new sponsorship agreement with the City of Toronto led to the conference centre being renamed to the Beanfield Centre.

=== Past uses ===
During the CNE:

- Art, manual education, home economics, and school projects from across the province, including work by auxiliary students and the disabled, in the Mezzanine. Displays moved there in 1939.
- Seventh Annual Shirley Temple "movie double" competition
- National Motor Show, 1929–1967
- "Farm, Food and Fun" displays, which had previously been hosted in the Agricultural buildings north of Princes' Boulevard.

Through the rest of the year:

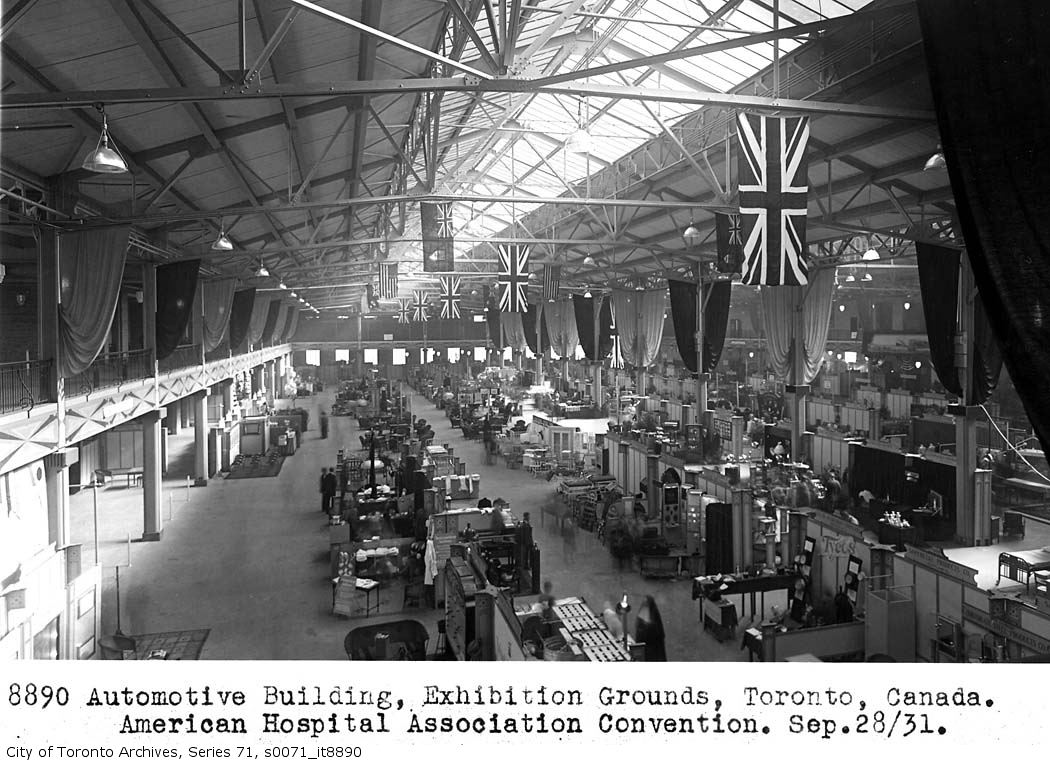
The 1931 American Hospital Association Convention held inside the Automotive Building

- American Hospital Association Convention
- Art Directors' Club of Toronto annual exhibition of Advertising and Editorial Art
- Canadian Graphic Arts Show
- Canadian Mobile Home and Travel Trailer Show
- Canadian National Samples Show
- Canadian Packaging Exposition, later known as PacEx
- Canadian Winter Sports Show
- General Motors Motorama
- National Automotive Parts and Equipment Show
- Plastics Show of Canada
- Toronto International Boat Show and National Marine Trade Show

=== As Allstream Centre ===
- Juno Awards Dinner 2011
