= Georges Lutz =

French cyclist

Personal information
- Born: 3 November 1884 Paris, France
- Died: 31 January 1915 (aged 30) Bar-le-Duc, France

Cycling career
- Sport: Cycling

Georges Lutz (3 November 1884 – 31 January 1915) was a French cyclist. He competed in two events at the 1908 Summer Olympics. He was killed in action during World War I.

== See also ==
- List of Olympians killed in World War I
