= Albert Jenicot =

French footballer (1885-1916)

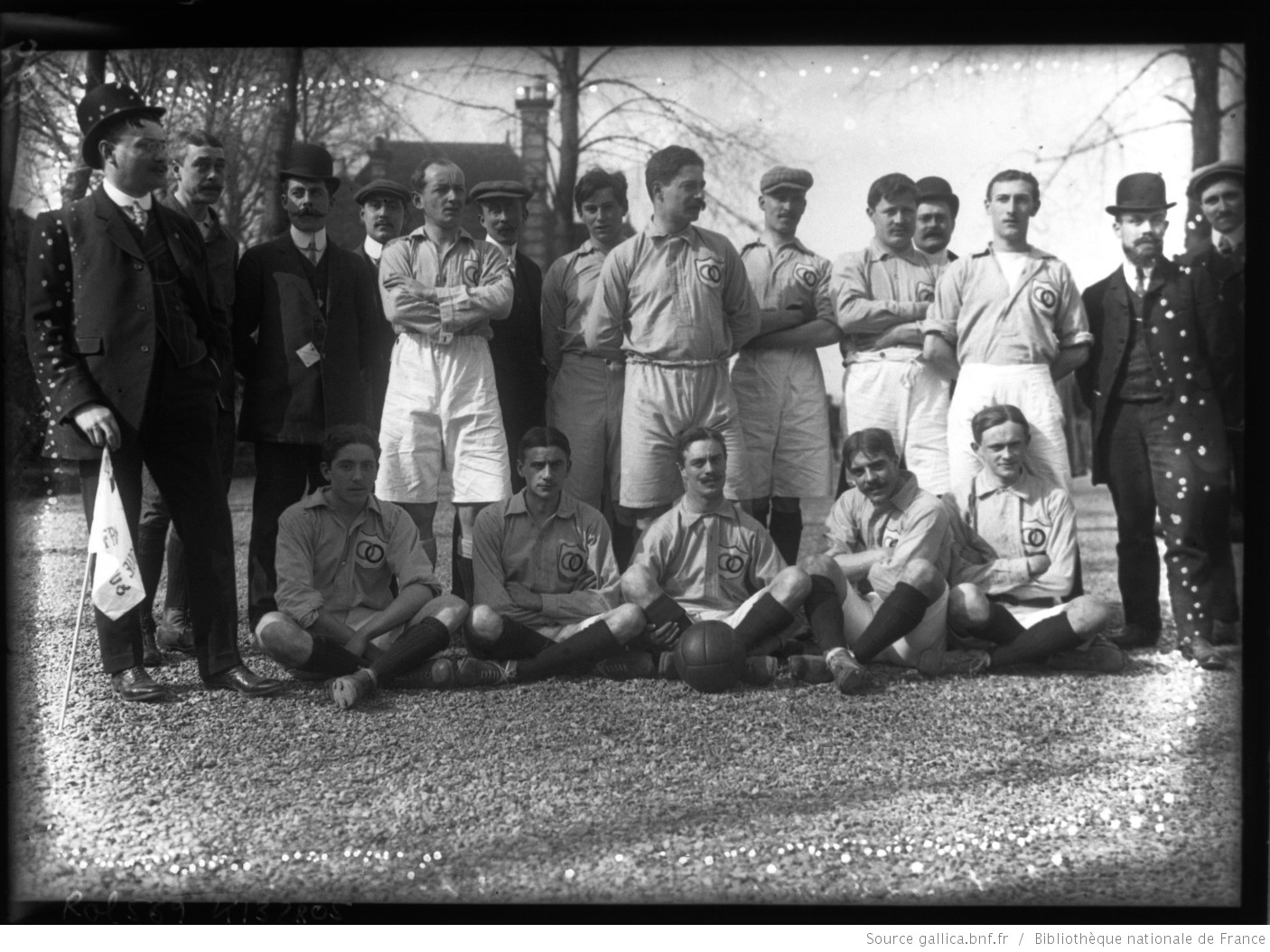

Personal information
- Date of birth: 15 February 1885
- Place of birth: Lille, France
- Date of death: 22 February 1916 (aged 31)
- Place of death: Vacherauville, France

International career
Years	Team	Apps	(Gls)
- France

Albert Jenicot (15 February 1885 – 22 February 1916) was a French footballer. He competed in the men's tournament at the 1908 Summer Olympics. He was killed in action during World War I.

== See also ==
- List of Olympians killed in World War I
