= Rowing at the 1908 Summer Olympics – Men's coxless four =

Men's coxless fours at the Games of the IV Olympiad
- Venue: River Thames
- Dates: July 28, 1908 (semifinals); July 31, 1908 (final)
- Competitors: 16 from 3 nations

Medalists
1st place, gold medalist(s)		Great Britain; Collier Cudmore, James Angus Gillan, Duncan Mackinnon, John Somers-Smith
2nd place, silver medalist(s)		Great Britain; Harold Barker, John Fenning, Philip Filleul, Gordon Thomson
3rd place, bronze medalist(s)		Canada; Gordon Balfour, Becher Gale, Charles Riddy, Geoffrey Taylor
3rd place, bronze medalist(s)		Netherlands; Hermannus Höfte, Albertus Wielsma, Johan Burk, Bernardus Croon

The men's coxless four was one of four rowing events on the Rowing at the 1908 Summer Olympics programme. Nations could enter up to 2 boats (total of 8 rowers). Four boats from three nations competed.

== Competition format ==
The 1908 tournament featured two rounds of one-on-one races; with 4 boats in the competition, the semifinals were the first round. Semifinal losers each received bronze medals, so that all competitors earned a medal. The course was 1.5 miles in length, with two slight bends near the start and about halfway.

== Standings ==
Place	Bow	Rowers	Stroke	Nation
1	Collier Cudmore	James Angus Gillan; Duncan Mackinnon	John Somers-Smith	Great Britain
2	Philip Filleul	Harold Barker; John Fenning	Gordon Thomson	Great Britain
3	Gordon Balfour	Becher Gale; Charles Riddy	Geoffrey Taylor	Canada
3	Hermannus Höfte	Albertus Wielsma; Johan Burk	Bernardus Croon	Netherlands

== Results ==
=== Semifinals ===
==== Semifinal 1 ====
The British four won by 2¼ lengths.

Place	Bow	Rowers	Stroke	Nation	Time
1	Collier Cudmore	James Angus Gillan; Duncan Mackinnon	John Somers-Smith	Great Britain	8:34.0
2	Gordon Balfour	Becher Gale; Charles Riddy	Geoffrey Taylor	Canada	(8:40.5)

==== Semifinal 2 ====
Place	Bow	Rowers	Stroke	Nation	Time
1	Philip Filleul	Harold Barker; John Fenning	Gordon Thomson	Great Britain	9:04.0
2	Hermannus Höfte	Albertus Wielsma; Johan Burk	Bernardus Croon	Netherlands	Unknown

=== Final ===
Place	Bow	Rowers	Stroke	Nation	Time
1	Collier Cudmore	James Angus Gillan; Duncan Mackinnon	John Somers-Smith	Great Britain	8:34.0
2	Philip Filleul	Harold Barker; John Fenning	Gordon Thomson	Great Britain	Unknown

== Sources ==
- Cook, Theodore Andrea (1908). The Fourth Olympiad, Being the Official Report. London: British Olympic Association.
- De Wael, Herman (2001). "Rowing 1908". Herman's Full Olympians.
