= Heinrich Burkowitz =

German sprinter

Personal information
- Nationality: German
- Born: 31 January 1892 Berlin, German Empire
- Died: 31 May 1915 (aged 23) Flanders, Belgium

Sport
- Sport: Sprinting
- Event: 400 metres

Heinrich Burkowitz (31 January 1892 – 31 May 1915) was a German sprinter. He competed at the 1912 Summer Olympics. He was killed in action in May 1915, while fighting in World War I.

== See also ==
- List of Olympians killed in World War I
