= List of Olympians killed in World War I =

A total of 143 Olympians are known to have been killed during World War I.^{A}

Name	Country^{B}	Sport(s)	Games	Medals	Ref
Andrey Akimov	Russian Empire	Football	1912 Summer Olympics		
Gordon Alexander	Great Britain	Fencing	1912 Summer Olympics		
Laurie Anderson	Great Britain	Athletics	1912 Summer Olympics		
William Anderson	Great Britain (GBR)	Athletics	1906 Intercalated Games		
Henry Ashington	Great Britain	Athletics	1912 Summer Olympics		
Louis Bach	France	Football	1900 Summer Olympics	2nd place, silver medalist(s)	
Fritz Bartholomae	Germany	Rowing	1912 Summer Olympics	3rd place, bronze medalist(s)	
Béla Békessy	Hungary	Fencing	1912 Summer Olympics	2nd place, silver medalist(s)	
Isaac Bentham	Great Britain	Water polo	1912 Summer Olympics	1st place, gold medalist(s)	
Renon Boissière	France	Athletics	1912 Summer Olympics		
Henri Bonnefoy	France	Shooting	1908 Summer Olympics	3rd place, bronze medalist(s)	
Hermann Bosch	Germany	Football	1912 Summer Olympics		
Jean Bouin	France	Athletics	1908 Summer Olympics, 1912 Summer Olympics	2nd place, silver medalist(s) 3rd place, bronze medalist(s)	
Hanns Braun	Germany (GER)	Athletics	1908 Summer Olympics, 1912 Summer Olympics	2nd place, silver medalist(s) 3rd place, bronze medalist(s)	
Karl Braunsteiner	Austria	Football	1912 Summer Olympics		
Kurt Bretting	Germany	Swimming	1912 Summer Olympics		
Wilhelm Brülle	Germany	Gymnastics	1912 Summer Olympics		
Heinrich Burkowitz	Germany	Athletics	1912 Summer Olympics		
Edmund Bury	Great Britain	Racquets	1908 Summer Olympics	2nd place, silver medalist(s)	
George Butterfield	Great Britain	Athletics	1908 Summer Olympics		
Oswald Carver	Great Britain	Rowing	1908 Summer Olympics	3rd place, bronze medalist(s)	
Joseph Caullé	France	Athletics	1912 Summer Olympics		
Ralph Chalmers	Great Britain	Fencing	1908 Summer Olympics		
Noel Chavasse	Great Britain	Athletics	1908 Summer Olympics		
Geoffrey Coles	Great Britain	Shooting	1908 Summer Olympics	3rd place, bronze medalist(s)	
André Corvington	Haiti (HAI)	Fencing	1900 Summer Olympics		
Percy Courtman	Great Britain	Swimming	1908 Summer Olympics, 1912 Summer Olympics	3rd place, bronze medalist(s)	
Harry Crank	Great Britain	Diving	1908 Summer Olympics		
Robert Davies	Great Britain	Shooting	1912 Summer Olympics		
Louis de Champsavin	France	Equestrianism	1900 Summer Olympics	3rd place, bronze medalist(s)	
Georges de la Nézière	France	Athletics	1896 Summer Olympics		
Bertrand Marie de Lesseps	France	Fencing	1908 Summer Olympics		
Ismaël de Lesseps	France	Fencing	1908 Summer Olympics		
Jean de Mas Latrie	France	Fencing, modern pentathlon	1908 Summer Olympics, 1912 Summer Olympics		
Félix Debax	France	Fencing	1900 Summer Olympics		
Alex Decoteau	Canada	Athletics	1912 Summer Olympics		
Oszkár Demján	Hungary	Swimming	1912 Summer Olympics		
Charles Devendeville	France	Swimming, water polo	1900 Summer Olympics	1st place, gold medalist(s)	
Joseph Dines	Great Britain	Football	1912 Summer Olympics	1st place, gold medalist(s)	
Herman Donners	Belgium	Water polo	1908 Summer Olympics, 1912 Summer Olympics	2nd place, silver medalist(s) 3rd place, bronze medalist(s)	
Jimmy Duffy	Canada	Athletics	1912 Summer Olympics		
Hugh Durant	Great Britain	Modern pentathlon, shooting	1912 Summer Olympics	3rd place, bronze medalist(s)	
George Fairbairn	Great Britain	Rowing	1908 Summer Olympics	2nd place, silver medalist(s)	
René Fenouillière	France	Football	1908 Summer Olympics		
Léon Flameng	France	Cycling	1896 Summer Olympics	1st place, gold medalist(s) 2nd place, silver medalist(s) 3rd place, bronze medalist(s)	
Alfred Flaxman	Great Britain	Athletics	1908 Summer Olympics		
Herbert Gayler	Great Britain	Cycling	1912 Summer Olympics		
Thomas Gillespie	Great Britain	Rowing	1912 Summer Olympics	2nd place, silver medalist(s)	
Henry Goldsmith	Great Britain	Rowing	1912 Summer Olympics	3rd place, bronze medalist(s)	
Lajos Gönczy	Hungary (HUN)	Athletics	1900 Summer Olympics, 1904 Summer Olympics, 1906 Intercalated Games	2nd place, silver medalist(s) 3rd place, bronze medalist(s)	
Carl Goßler	Germany	Rowing	1900 Summer Olympics	1st place, gold medalist(s)	
Jaroslav Hainz	Bohemia	Tennis	1912 Summer Olympics		
Juho Halme	Finland	Athletics	1908 Summer Olympics, 1912 Summer Olympics		
Wyndham Halswelle	Great Britain	Athletics	1906 Intercalated Games, 1908 Summer Olympics	1st place, gold medalist(s) 2nd place, silver medalist(s) 3rd place, bronze medalist(s)	
George Hawkins	Great Britain	Athletics	1908 Summer Olympics		
Harold Hawkins	Great Britain	Shooting	1908 Summer Olympics	2nd place, silver medalist(s)	
Cecil Healy	Australia (AUS), Australasia	Swimming	1906 Intercalated Games, 1912 Summer Olympics	1st place, gold medalist(s) 2nd place, silver medalist(s) 3rd place, bronze medalist(s)	
Max Herrmann	Germany	Athletics	1912 Summer Olympics		
George Hutson	Great Britain	Athletics	1912 Summer Olympics	3rd place, bronze medalist(s)	
Albert Jenicot	France	Football	1908 Summer Olympics		
Walther Jesinghaus	Germany	Gymnastics	1912 Summer Olympics		
Ernest Keeley	South Africa (RSA)	Shooting	1912 Summer Olympics		
Frederick Kelly	Great Britain	Rowing	1908 Summer Olympics	1st place, gold medalist(s)	
Paul Kenna	Great Britain	Equestrianism	1912 Summer Olympics		
Alister Kirby	Great Britain	Rowing	1912 Summer Olympics	1st place, gold medalist(s)	
Frederick Kitching	Great Britain	Athletics	1908 Summer Olympics		
Adolf Kofler	Austria	Cycling	1912 Summer Olympics		
Georg Krogmann	Germany	Football	1912 Summer Olympics		
Nikolai Kynin	Russian Empire	Football	1912 Summer Olympics		
Ivan Laing	Great Britain	Hockey	1908 Summer Olympics	3rd place, bronze medalist(s)	
Octave Lapize	France	Cycling	1908 Summer Olympics	3rd place, bronze medalist(s)	
Henry Leeke	Great Britain	Athletics	1908 Summer Olympics		
Erich Lehmann	Germany	Athletics	1912 Summer Olympics		
Feliks Leparsky	Russian Empire	Fencing	1912 Summer Olympics		
Georges Lutz	France	Cycling	1908 Summer Olympics		
Wilhelm Lützow	Germany	Swimming	1912 Summer Olympics	2nd place, silver medalist(s)	
William Lyshon	United States	Wrestling	1912 Summer Olympics		
Henry Macintosh	Great Britain	Athletics	1912 Summer Olympics	1st place, gold medalist(s)	
Duncan Mackinnon	Great Britain	Rowing	1908 Summer Olympics	1st place, gold medalist(s)	
Gilchrist Maclagan	Great Britain	Rowing	1908 Summer Olympics	1st place, gold medalist(s)	
Leopold Mayer	Austria (AUT)	Swimming	1906 Intercalated Games		
Alphonse Meignant	France	Rowing	1912 Summer Olympics		
Robert Merz	Austria	Football	1912 Summer Olympics		
Georg Mickler	Germany	Athletics	1912 Summer Olympics		
Percival Molson	Canada	Athletics	1904 Summer Olympics		
Alfred Motté	France	Athletics	1908 Summer Olympics, 1912 Summer Olympics		
István Mudin	Hungary (HUN)	Athletics	1906 Intercalated Games, 1908 Summer Olympics	2nd place, silver medalist(s) 3rd place, bronze medalist(s)	
Edward Nash	Great Britain	Equestrianism	1912 Summer Olympics		
Grigori Nikitin	Russian Empire	Football	1912 Summer Olympics		
Charles Oldaker	Great Britain	Gymnastics	1908 Summer Olympics		
Harcourt Ommundsen	Great Britain	Shooting	1908 Summer Olympics, 1912 Summer Olympics	2nd place, silver medalist(s)	
Alan Patterson	Great Britain	Athletics	1908 Summer Olympics, 1912 Summer Olympics		
Árpád Pédery	Hungary	Gymnastics	1912 Summer Olympics	2nd place, silver medalist(s)	
Jacques Person	Germany	Athletics	1912 Summer Olympics		
William Philo	Great Britain	Boxing	1908 Summer Olympics	3rd place, bronze medalist(s)	
Hermann Plaskuda	Germany	Fencing	1912 Summer Olympics		
Léon Ponscarme	France	Cycling	1900 Summer Olympics		
Bobby Powell	Canada	Tennis	1908 Summer Olympics		
Kenneth Powell	Great Britain	Athletics, tennis	1908 Summer Olympics, 1912 Summer Olympics		
Reggie Pridmore	Great Britain	Hockey	1908 Summer Olympics	1st place, gold medalist(s)	
Joseph Racine	France	Cycling	1912 Summer Olympics		
Thomas Raddall	Great Britain	Shooting	1908 Summer Olympics		
Maurice Raoul-Duval	France	Polo	1900 Summer Olympics	3rd place, bronze medalist(s)	
Josef Rieder	Germany	Cycling	1912 Summer Olympics		
John Robinson	Great Britain	Hockey	1908 Summer Olympics	1st place, gold medalist(s)	
Patrick Roche	Great Britain	Athletics	1908 Summer Olympics		
Claude Ross	Australasia	Athletics	1912 Summer Olympics		
Albert Rowland	Australasia	Athletics	1908 Summer Olympics		
Maurice Salomez	France	Athletics	1900 Summer Olympics		
Ronald Sanderson	Great Britain	Rowing	1908 Summer Olympics	1st place, gold medalist(s)	
Ludwig Sauerhöfer	Germany	Wrestling	1912 Summer Olympics		
Heinrich Schneidereit	Germany (GER)	Tug of war, weightlifting	1906 Intercalated Games	1st place, gold medalist(s) 3rd place, bronze medalist(s)	
André Six	France	Swimming	1900 Summer Olympics	2nd place, silver medalist(s)	
Pierre Six	France	Football	1908 Summer Olympics		
Michel Soalhat	France (FRA)	Athletics	1906 Intercalated Games		
John Somers-Smith	Great Britain	Rowing	1908 Summer Olympics	1st place, gold medalist(s)	
Eberhard Sorge	Germany	Gymnastics	1912 Summer Olympics		
Alfred Staats	Germany	Gymnastics	1912 Summer Olympics		
Jenő Szántay	Hungary	Fencing	1908 Summer Olympics		
Geoffrey Taylor	Canada (CAN)	Rowing	1908 Summer Olympics, 1912 Summer Olympics	3rd place, bronze medalist(s)	
Waldemar Tietgens	Germany	Rowing	1900 Summer Olympics	1st place, gold medalist(s)	
Dragutin Tomašević	Serbia	Athletics	1912 Summer Olympics		
Justin Vialaret	France	Football	1908 Summer Olympics		
Charles Vigurs	Great Britain	Gymnastics	1908 Summer Olympics, 1912 Summer Olympics	3rd place, bronze medalist(s)	
Hermann von Bönninghausen	Germany (GER)	Athletics	1908 Summer Olympics, 1912 Summer Olympics		
Bernhard von Gaza	Germany	Rowing	1908 Summer Olympics	3rd place, bronze medalist(s)	
Amon Ritter von Gregurich	Hungary	Fencing	1900 Summer Olympics		
Béla von Las-Torres	Hungary (HUN)	Swimming	1908 Summer Olympics, 1912 Summer Olympics	2nd place, silver medalist(s)	
Eduard von Lütcken	Germany	Equestrianism	1912 Summer Olympics	2nd place, silver medalist(s)	
Friedrich Karl, Prince von Preußen	Germany	Equestrianism	1912 Summer Olympics	3rd place, bronze medalist(s)	
Edmond Wallace	France	Fencing	1900 Summer Olympics		
Rudolf Watzl	Austria (AUT)	Wrestling	1906 Intercalated Games	1st place, gold medalist(s) 3rd place, bronze medalist(s)	
Arthur Wear	United States	Tennis	1904 Summer Olympics	3rd place, bronze medalist(s)	
Arthur Wilde	Great Britain	Shooting	1908 Summer Olympics		
Tony Wilding	Australasia	Tennis	1912 Summer Olympics	3rd place, bronze medalist(s)	
Edward Williams	Great Britain	Rowing	1908 Summer Olympics	3rd place, bronze medalist(s)	
Arthur Wilson	Great Britain	Rugby	1908 Summer Olympics	2nd place, silver medalist(s)	
Herbert Wilson	Great Britain	Polo	1908 Summer Olympics	1st place, gold medalist(s)	
Richard Yorke	Great Britain	Athletics	1908 Summer Olympics, 1912 Summer Olympics		
Heinrich Ziegler	Germany	Fencing	1912 Summer Olympics		
Béla Zulawszky	Hungary (HUN)	Fencing	1908 Summer Olympics, 1912 Summer Olympics	2nd place, silver medalist(s)	

== See also ==
- List of international rugby union players killed in World War I

== Notes ==
A. This includes Hermann von Bönninghausen and Paul Berger, who both died following the war of complications from their war injuries.
B. The country the individual competed for at the time.
