= Emil Irgens =

Norwegian rower

Personal information
- Nationality: Norwegian
- Born: 2 August 1883 Oslo, Norway
- Died: 13 July 1918 (aged 34) Oslo, Norway

Sport
- Sport: Rowing

Emil Irgens (2 August 1883 – 13 July 1918) was a Norwegian rower. He competed in the men's eight event at the 1908 Summer Olympics. In 1918, Irgens died of the Spanish flu.
