= Ambrosius Høyer =

Norwegian rower

Personal information
- Full name: Ambrosius Imanuel Høyer
- Nationality: Norwegian
- Born: 9 August 1886; Oslo, Norway
- Died: 9 May 1919 (aged 32); Oslo, Norway

Sport
- Sport: Rowing

Ambrosius Imanuel Høyer (9 August 1886 – 9 May 1919) was a Norwegian rower. He competed in the men's eight event at the 1908 Summer Olympics.
