= Pierre Six =

French footballer (1888–1916)

Personal information
- Date of birth: 18 January 1888
- Place of birth: Le Havre, France
- Date of death: 7 July 1916 (aged 28)
- Place of death: Somme, France
- Position: Midfielder

International career
Years	Team	Apps	(Gls)
- France B

Pierre Six (18 January 1888 – 7 July 1916) was a French footballer. He competed in the men's tournament at the 1908 Summer Olympics. He was killed in action during World War I.

== See also ==
- List of Olympians killed in World War I
