= Norway Jackes =

Canadian rower

Olympic medal record

Men's rowing

Representing Canada
Bronze medal – third place	1908 London	Coxless pair

Norway Baldwin Jackes (June 8, 1881 – July 8, 1964) was a Canadian rower who competed in the 1908 Summer Olympics. He was the strokeman of the Canadian boat, which won the bronze medal in the coxless pair.

He went on to become a Canadian soldier in the First World War. He later lived in Port Hope, Ontario, where he died in 1964.
