= Arthur Wilde =

British sports shooter

Personal information
- Born: 1879
- Died: 21 January 1916 (aged 36–37)

Sport
- Sport: Sports shooting

Arthur William Wilde (1879 – 21 January 1916) was a British sports shooter. He competed in three events at the 1908 Summer Olympics. He was killed in action during World War I.

== See also ==
- List of Olympians killed in World War I
