= Martin Stahnke =

German rower

Olympic medal record

Men's rowing
Bronze medal – third place	1908 London	Coxless pair

Martin Stahnke (11 November 1888 in Briesen – 28 February 1969 in Frankfurt am Main) was a German rower. He won the bronze medal in the men's coxless pair, along with Willy Düskow in the 1908 Summer Olympics.
