= Walter Lewis (rower) =

Canadian rower

Olympic medal record

Men's rowing
| Bronze medal – third place | 1908 London | Eight |

Walter Aiken Lewis (July 17, 1885 – May 29, 1956) was a Canadian rower who competed in the 1908 Summer Olympics. He was a crew member of the Canadian boat, which won the bronze medal in the men's eight.
