= Willy Düskow =

German rower (1879–1962)

Olympic medal record

Men's rowing
Bronze medal – third place	1908 London	Coxless pair

Willy Düskow (25 September 1879 – 14 September 1962) was a German rower. He won the bronze medal in the men's coxless pair along with Martin Stahnke in the 1908 Summer Olympics.
