= Collier Cudmore =

Australian politician and rower

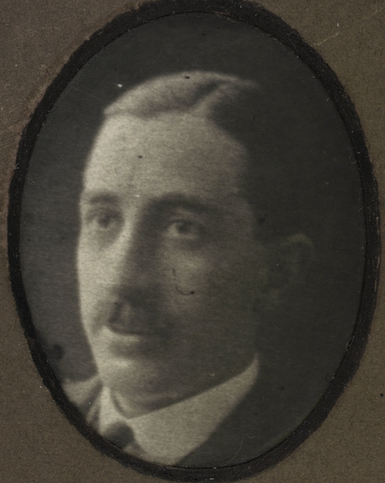
- Cudmore circa 1915 (age 30)

Medal record

Men's rowing
Gold medal – first place	1908 London	Coxless four

Sir Collier Robert Cudmore (13 June 1885 – 16 May 1971) was an Australian lawyer, politician and Olympic rower who won the gold medal in the 1908 Summer Olympics for Great Britain.

== Early life and rowing career ==
Cudmore was born at Avoca, Wentworth, New South Wales, Australia, the son of Daniel Henry Cudmore, a pastoralist, and his second wife Martha Earle, née McCracken. He attended St Peter's College and the University of Adelaide. He went to England to continue his education at Magdalen College, Oxford, where he rowed for his college and for Oxford in the Boat Race of 1908. He was a member of the Magdalen College Coxless four, which won the Stewards' Challenge Cup and the Visitors' Challenge Cup at Henley Royal Regatta in 1908. The Magdalen crew was chosen to represent Great Britain rowing at the 1908 Summer Olympics, and Cudmore was the bow-man in the four with John Somers-Smith, Angus Gillan and Duncan Mackinnon. The crew won the gold medal for Great Britain and defeated a Leander crew. Cudmore rowed again for Oxford in the Boat Race in 1909.

Cudmore studied law at the Inner Temple and was called to the bar in 1910, then returned to Australia and formed a partnership with Stanley Murray. He practiced law until 1955.

An officer in the Royal Field Artillery Special Reserve, Cudmore commanded a battery in France during the First World War. He was wounded twice and, as a result, was plagued by back problems for the rest of his life.

== Political career ==
Returning from Europe in 1919, Cudmore became interested in Australian politics. He was involved in the administration of the State Repatriation Board, the Soldiers' Fund, and the South Australian Sailors and Soldiers' Distress Fund. As vice-president of the South Australian Liberal Federation, he was a force behind its 1932 merger with the Country Party to form the Liberal and Country League.

In 1933 Cudmore was elected to the Legislative Council to represent Adelaide Central District No.2. From 1934 to 1936 he was president of the Liberal and Country League. From 1939 to 1959, when he retired, he was the leader of his party in the Upper House. Cudmore was an outspoken opponent of Thomas Playford IV's nationalization of the Adelaide Electric Company, which was owned by Murray and constituted a major draw on a treasury already at its limits. The bill was defeated at first. However, when the bill was reintroduced in 1946, he absented himself from a key division, allowing the bill to pass.

A liberal conservative, Cudmore pursued a reform agenda that often conflicted with the more traditionalist members of his party, most particularly Playford. He advocated harsher sentences for child abusers, a parliamentary public accounts committee, relaxed gaming regulation, extended liquor trading hours, and the establishment of a well-regulated red-light district, often working with the Labor government to achieve his aims from opposition. Cudmore also achieved animal protection laws, pensions for supreme court judges, and mandatory tuberculosis examinations.

He was knighted in 1958.

== See also ==
- List of Oxford University Boat Race crews
