= Geoffrey Taylor (rower) =

Canadian rower

Olympic medal record

Men's rowing
| Bronze medal – third place | 1908 London | Coxless four |
| Bronze medal – third place | 1908 London | Eight |

Geoffrey Barron Taylor (February 4, 1890 – April 25, 1915) was a Canadian rower from Toronto who competed in the 1908 Summer Olympics and the 1912 Summer Olympics.

As a member of Toronto's Argonaut Rowing Club, he was stroke of the 1907 Junior four and eight at 17 years of age. That year, at the Royal Canadian Henley Regatta, he made history, winning the Junior, Intermediate, and Senior fours as well as the Junior and Senior Eights. In all, five Henley wins in one day - a feat that has never been equaled over 100 years later. He was stroke of the Canadian boat which won the bronze medal in the coxless four in 1908, when he also stroked the Canadian eight which won the bronze medal behind Leander Club (gold) and Belgium (silver).

Taylor was a student at Trinity College, Oxford University when World War I began. He left his studies and was commissioned into the 15th Battalion (48th Highlanders of Canada), CEF, on the unit's arrival in England in February 1915 with the Canadian Expeditionary Force, and fell in action with it as a lieutenant on April 24, 1915, aged 25 at the 2nd Battle of Ypres. His body was not recovered from the field, and his name is engraved on the gateway for the missing of the Ypres Salient at Menin.

== See also ==
- List of Olympians killed in World War I
