= George Eric Fairbairn =

British rower

Olympic medal record

Men's rowing
Silver medal – second place	1908 London	Coxless pair

George Eric Fairbairn (18 August 1888 – 20 June 1915) was a British rower who competed in the 1908 Summer Olympics. He was killed in action in the First World War.

Fairbairn was born at Melbourne Australia, the son of Thomas Fairbairn, a pastoralist, and his wife Lena Carmyle. He was also the nephew of rower Steve Fairbairn. He was educated at Eton College and Jesus College, Cambridge and rowed for Cambridge in the Boat Race in 1908. At the 1908 Summer Olympics, most of the Cambridge crew competed in the eight, which won the bronze medal, but Fairbairn went into the coxless pairs with Philip Verdon and won the silver medal. In 1909 he missed the Boat Race because of illness. Fairbairn also played rugby for Rosslyn Park F.C.

During the First World War, Fairbairn served as a second lieutenant with the Durham Light Infantry and was killed in action, aged 26, at Bailleul. He was buried at the Bailleul Communal Cemetery nearby.

== See also ==
- List of Olympians killed in World War I
- List of Cambridge University Boat Race crews
