= Duncan Mackinnon =

British rower (1887–1917)

Olympic medal record

Men's rowing

Representing Great Britain
Gold medal – first place	1908 London	Coxless four

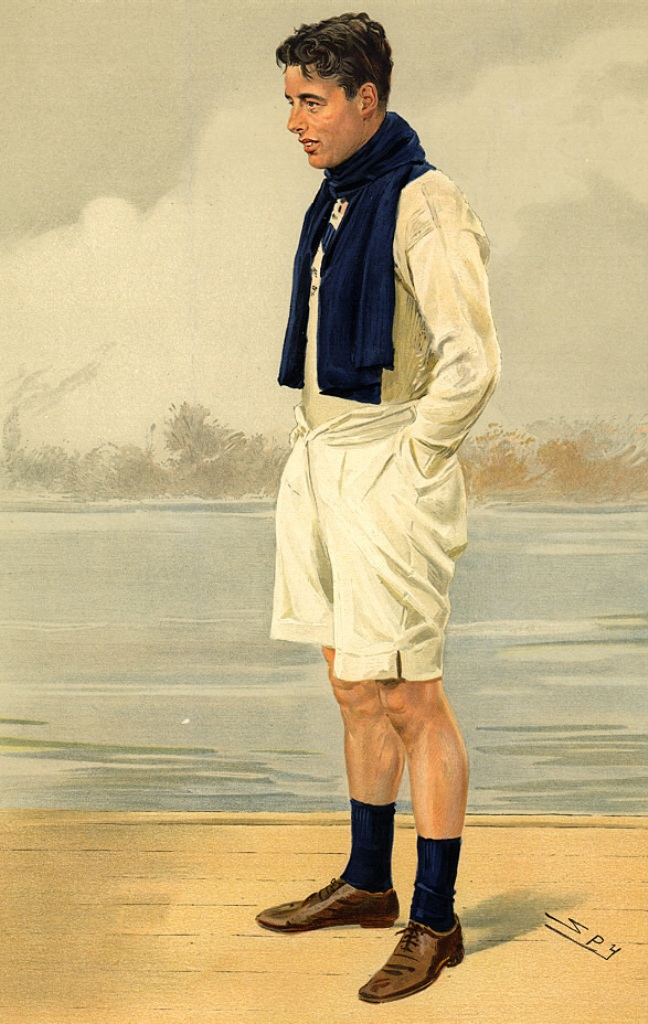
Duncan Mackinnon – caricature in The World 1910

Duncan Mackinnon (29 September 1887 – 9 October 1917) was a British rower who competed in the 1908 Summer Olympics. He was killed in action during the First World War.

Mackinnon was born in Paddington, London, and was educated at Rugby School and Magdalen College, Oxford. He rowed for his college, and the Magdalen College Coxless four won the Stewards' Challenge Cup and the Visitors' Challenge Cup at Henley Royal Regatta in 1907 and 1908. The Magdalen crew was chosen to represent Great Britain rowing at the 1908 Summer Olympics, and Mackinnon was in the four with Collier Cudmore, John Somers-Smith and James Angus Gillan. The crew won the gold medal for Great Britain and defeated a Leander crew. Subsequently, Mackinnon rowed for the winning Oxford crews in the Boat Race in 1909, 1910 and 1911. Mackinnon was also in the winning crew in the Grand Challenge Cup twice and in the Wyfold Challenge Cup once, losing only two races in all his Henley appearances.

After Oxford, Mackinnon became a partner in the family business in Calcutta. He returned to England on the outbreak of World War I and was commissioned into the Royal North Devon Hussars. He transferred to the Scots Guards and served with them as a lieutenant. He was killed in action at Ypres in the Battle of Passchendaele, aged 30. His remains were not recovered. His name is recorded on the Tyne Cot Memorial nearby.

Mackinnon left a legacy of £80,000 to establish scholarships at Magdalen College, which became effective by reversion in 1938.

== See also ==
- List of Olympians killed in World War I
- List of Oxford University Boat Race crews
