= Henry Bucknall =

British rower (1885–1962)

Olympic medal record

Men's rowing

Representing Great Britain
Gold medal – first place	1908 London	Eight

Henry Creswell Bucknall (4 July 1885 – 1 January 1962) was a British rower who competed in the 1908 Summer Olympics.

Bucknall was born in Lisbon, Portugal. He was educated at Eton College, where he stroked the Eton boat, and then went to Merton College, Oxford. In 1905, he stroked the winning Oxford boat in the Boat Race. He stroked the losing crew in 1906, and in 1907 he was President of the Oxford University Boat Club, and elected to row at number two in the race which Cambridge won again. He joined Leander Club, and in 1908, he was the strokeman of the Leander eight, which won the gold medal for Great Britain rowing at the 1908 Summer Olympics. He stroked a Clube Naval de Lisboa team that, for the first time, beat the English rowers of Carcavelos Club. They spent one week at Sarilhos Pequenos, in his father's property, training for the race.

After university, Bucknall joined a shipbuilding firm in Newcastle upon Tyne.

Bucknall died in Northumberland at the age of 76.

== See also ==
- List of Oxford University Boat Race crews
