= Irvine Robertson =

Canadian rower

Olympic medal record

Men's rowing

Representing Canada
Bronze medal – third place	1908 London	Eight

Irvine Geale Robertson (July 10, 1882 – February 26, 1956) was a Canadian rower who competed in the 1908 Summer Olympics. He was a bowman of the Canadian boat, which won the bronze medal in the men's eight.
