= Douglas Kertland =

Canadian coxswain and architect

Personal information
- Born: November 23, 1887 Toronto, Ontario
- Died: March 4, 1982 (aged 94)
Medal record
Men's rowing
Bronze medal – third place	1908 London	Eight

Douglas Edwin Kertland (November 23, 1887 – March 4, 1982) was a Canadian architect and athlete. He was a rower who competed in the 1908 Summer Olympics. He was a coxswain of the Canadian boat, which won the bronze medal in the men's eight. He later became an architect and designed numerous buildings in Canada, and was a president of the Royal Architectural Institute of Canada (RAIC).

== Life and career ==
Born in Toronto, Kertland moved to England as a child and was educated in schools in that country. Upon returning to Canada, he, along with his father and brother, were members of the Argonaut Rowing Club in Toronto. He competed in the 1908 Summer Olympics, during which he was coxswain of the Canadian boat which won the bronze medal in the men's eight.

During World War I, because of his prior training in architecture, he served in the Canadian Military Engineers and was part of the 126th Battalion. He achieved the rank of captain. Immediately following the end of the war he returned to Toronto where he joined the architecture firm of John M. Lyle. He established his own practice in Toronto in 1926. He designed numerous homes in the Rosedale neighbourhood of Toronto. He won a 1928 design competition and designed the Art Deco Automotive Building exhibition hall at Exhibition Place in Toronto. He designed many hospitals and banks in addition to office and residential buildings. Kertland was president of the RAIC in 1956 and 1958. He was also an honorary member of both the New Zealand Institute of Architects and the American Association of Architects.

He was married to Gladys McMurrich and, later, to May Warren Bray. In 1976, he donated the records of his architectural practices to the Archives of Ontario.

Kertland died on March 4, 1982 at Wellesley Hospital in Toronto, Ontario.
