= James Angus Gillan =

British colonial administrator

Medal record

Men's rowing

Representing Great Britain

Olympic Games
Gold medal – first place	1908 London	Men's coxless four
Gold medal – first place	1912 Stockholm	Men's eight

Sir James Angus Gillan (11 October 1885 – 23 April 1981) was a Scottish rower and colonial service official. He competed in the 1908 Summer Olympics and in the 1912 Summer Olympics.

== Biography ==
Gillan was born in Aberdeen, Scotland, and was educated at Edinburgh Academy and Magdalen College, Oxford. He rowed for Oxford in the Boat Race in 1907, but missed the 1908 race because of a severe attack of influenza. He also rowed for his college and the Magdalen College coxless four won the Stewards' Challenge Cup and the Visitors' Challenge Cup at Henley Royal Regatta in 1907 and 1908. The Magdalen crew was chosen to represent Great Britain rowing at the 1908 Summer Olympics, and Gillan was in the four with Collier Cudmore, John Somers-Smith and Duncan Mackinnon. The crew won the gold medal for Great Britain and defeated a Leander crew. Gillan rowed for Oxford again in the Boat Race in 1909.

In 1909 Gillan joined the Sudan Political Service, but returned on leave in 1911 and as a member of Leander Club and was in the crew that won the Grand Challenge Cup at Henley in 1911. He was home on leave again in 1912 and was member of the British eight which won the gold medal rowing at the 1912 Summer Olympics in Stockholm. He was in the UK again in 1917 when he married Margaret Douglas Ord Mackenzie at Holy Trinity Church, Brompton.

Gillan served in the Sudan for thirty years and became Civil Secretary in 1934. He was appointed a CMG in 1935 and a KBE in 1939. After World War II, Gillan headed the Empire Division of the British Council and played a major part in the organization of the 1948 Summer Olympics in London. In 1949 he left the Colonial Service and became the British Council representative in Australia until 1951. Back in England, he was chairman of the Royal Overseas League from 1955 to 1962.

Gillan died at Leigh, Surrey, at the age of 95.

== See also ==
- List of Oxford University Boat Race crews
