= Charles Oldaker =

British gymnast (1887–1915)

- Full name: Charles John Swinbourne Oldaker
- Born: 1887 Smethwick, England
- Died: 26 September 1915 (aged 27–28) Givenchy-lès-la-Bassée, France

Gymnastics career
- Discipline: Men's artistic gymnastics
- Country represented: (United Kingdom) Great Britain

Charles John Swinbourne Oldaker (1887 – 26 September 1915) was a British gymnast. He competed in the men's team event at the 1908 Summer Olympics. He was killed in action during World War I.

== Personal life ==
Oldaker served as a lance sergeant in the Worcestershire Regiment during the First World War. He was killed in action on 26 September 1915 in the area of Givenchy-lès-la-Bassée. Oldaker's body was not recovered, and he is commemorated at Loos Memorial.

== See also ==
- List of Olympians killed in World War I
