= Frederick Toms =

Canadian rower

Olympic medal record

Men's rowing
Bronze medal – third place	1908 London	Coxless pair

Frederick Percy Toms (April 15, 1885 – June 26, 1965) was a Canadian rower who competed in the 1908 Summer Olympics. He was the bowman of the Canadian boat, which won the bronze medal in the coxless pair.
