= Becher Gale =

Canadian rower

Olympic medal record

Men's rowing

Representing Canada

Olympic Games
Bronze medal – third place	1908 London	Men's coxless four
Bronze medal – third place	1908 London	Eight

Becher Robert Gale (April 14, 1887 – August 24, 1950) was a Canadian rower who competed in the 1908 Summer Olympics. He was a member of the Canadian boat that won the bronze medal in the coxless four event. He was also a crew member of the Canadian boat that won the bronze medal in the eight event.
