= Julius Thomson (rower) =

Canadian rower (1882–1940)

Olympic medal record

Men's rowing
| Bronze medal – third place | 1908 London | Eight |

Julius Alexander Thomson (September 4, 1882 – October 26, 1940) was a Canadian rower who competed in the 1908 Summer Olympics. He was a crew member of the Canadian boat, which won the bronze medal in the men's eight.
