= Harold Barker (rower) =

British rower

Olympic medal record

Men's rowing
Silver medal – second place	1908 London	Coxless four

Harold Ross Barker (12 April 1886 – 29 August 1937) was an English rower who competed in the 1908 Summer Olympics for Great Britain.

Barker was born at Marylebone, London. He was educated at Christ Church, Oxford and was a member of the Oxford crew in the Boat Race in 1908. He also won the Silver Goblets at Henley Royal Regatta in 1908, partnering Albert Gladstone to beat Julius Beresford and Karl Vernon. He was then a member of the Leander coxless four with Philip Filleul, John Fenning and Gordon Thomson which won a silver medal for Great Britain rowing at the 1908 Summer Olympics and which lost to the Magdalen College, Oxford crew. Barker rowed again in the Oxford crew in the Boat Race in 1909.

Barker died at Henley-on-Thames at the age of 51.

Barker married Ellen Powell in 1909. She was the sister of fellow rowers Ronald Powell and Eric Powell.

== See also ==
- List of Oxford University Boat Race crews
