= Gordon Balfour =

Canadian rower

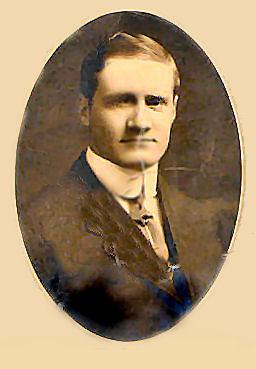
- Balfour, graduation photo from Osgoode Hall Law School, 1909.

Personal information
- Died: July 31, 1949 (aged 66)
Medal record
Men's rowing
Representing Canada
Olympic Games
Bronze medal – third place	1908 London	Coxless four
Bronze medal – third place	1908 London	Eight

Gordon Bruce Balfour (December 25, 1882 – July 31, 1949) was a Canadian rower who competed in the 1908 Summer Olympics. He was the bowman of the Canadian boat, which won the bronze medal in the coxless four. He was also a crew member of the Canadian boat, which won the bronze medal in the men's eight.

Balfour graduated from Osgoode Hall Law School in 1909 and later served in the Canadian Field Artillery in World War I.
