= Charles Riddy =

Canadian rower

Olympic medal record

Men's rowing
Bronze medal – third place	1908 London	Coxless four
Bronze medal – third place	1908 London	Eight

Charles Riddy (March 3, 1885 – June 11, 1979) was a Canadian rower who competed in the 1908 Summer Olympics in London, England and the 1912 Summer Olympics in Stockholm, Sweden.

In the 1908 Summer Olympics, he was a rower in the Canadian coxless four boat and the Canadian men's eight boat, winning bronze medals in both events.

In the 1912 Summer Olympics, he competed in the Canadian men's eight boat but did not win a medal.

Riddy moved from his job as a cash boy and stock boy in the millinery department of T. Eaton's to a position with Toronto Dominion Bank in 1903, the same year that he joined the Toronto Canoe Club.

In 1905, he entered the Club races and won the Novice Division.

In 1906, Riddy won the Canadian Junior Singles Championship.

In 1907, Riddy joined the Toronto Argonauts, rowing in the winning fours boat in the Junior, Intermediate, and Senior Canadian Championship held in St. Catharines, Ontario. At the same meet, he rowed in the winning eights boat in the Junior and Senior Championship.

Also in 1907, Riddy rowed in the winning senior four and eight boats at the U.S. Championship held in Philadelphia, Pennsylvania.

During 1909 and 1910, Riddy was the Argonauts Rowing captain, winning the club championship (The Hammond Cup).

In 1913, Riddy competed at The Henley Regatta in England.

Riddy was the oldest living Canadian Olympian when the 1976 Summer Olympic Games were held in Montreal, Quebec, Canada, though he was not invited to attend.
