= Hermannus Höfte =

Dutch rower (1884–1961)

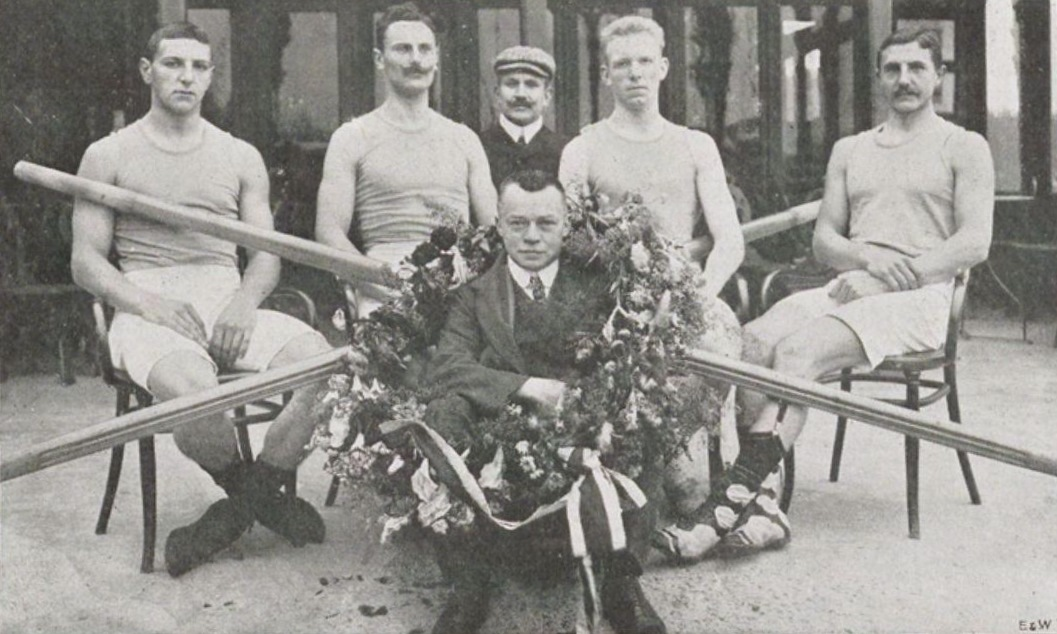
- Höfte in 1907

Personal information
- Nationality: Dutch
- Born: 4 August 1884 Amsterdam, Netherlands
- Died: 18 November 1961 (aged 67) Amsterdam, Netherlands

Sport
- Country: NED
- Sport: Rowing

Olympic medal record

Men's rowing
Bronze medal – third place	1908 London	Coxless four

Hermannus Höfte (5 August 1884 in Amsterdam – 18 November 1961 in Amsterdam) was a Dutch rower.

After a four month training period, he competed in the 1908 Summer Olympics in the coxless four event. He and the other of the team were a member of "de Amstel" and trained by Ooms. He was the bowman of the Dutch boat, which won the bronze medal in the coxless fours.
