= Albertus Wielsma =

Dutch rower (1883–1968)

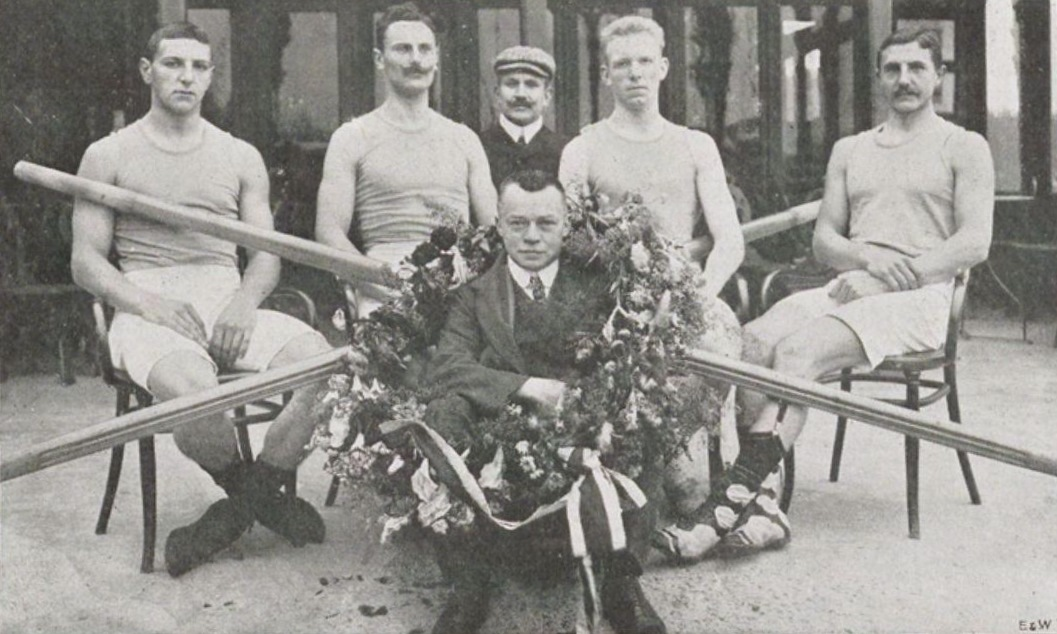
- Wielsma in 1907

Personal information
- Nationality: Dutch
- Born: 11 December 1883 Amsterdam
- Died: 26 March 1968 (aged 84) Amsterdam

Sport
- Country: Netherlands
- Sport: Rowing
Medal record
Men's rowing
Representing Netherlands
Olympic Games
Bronze medal – third place	1908 London	Coxless four

Albertus Wielsma (19 December 1883, in Amsterdam – 26 March 1968, in Amsterdam) was a Dutch rower.

== Career ==
After a four month training period, he competed in the 1908 Summer Olympics in the coxless four event. He and the other of the team were a member of "de Amstel" and trained by Ooms. The team won the bronze medal in the coxless four.
