= Bernardus Croon =

Dutch rower (1886–1960)

Olympic medal record

Men's rowing
Bronze medal – third place	1908 London	Coxless four

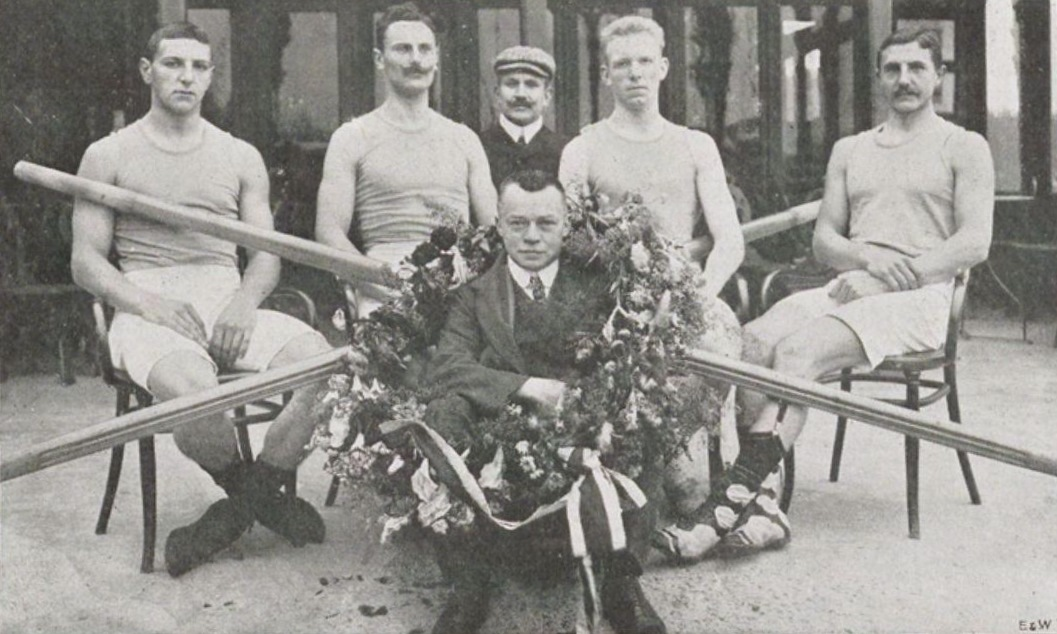
Croon in 1907

Bernardus Hermanus Croon (11 May 1886, in Amsterdam – 30 January 1960, in Amsterdam) was a Dutch rower who competed in the 1908 Summer Olympics.

After a four-month training period, he competed in the 1908 Summer Olympics in the coxless four event. He and the other of the team were a member of "de Amstel" and were trained by Ooms. He was the strokeman of the Dutch boat, which won the bronze medal in the coxless fours.
