= The Boat Race 1907 =

64th Boat Race
- Date: 16 March 1907
- Winner: Cambridge
- Margin of victory: 4 1/2 lengths
- Winning time: 20 minutes 26 seconds
- Overall record (Cambridge–Oxford): 29–34
- Umpire: Frederick I. Pitman (Cambridge)

The 64th Boat Race took place on 16 March 1907. Held annually, the Boat Race is a side-by-side rowing race between crews from the Universities of Oxford and Cambridge along the River Thames. Cambridge were reigning champions, having won the previous year's race, and more than half their crew had already participated in the event. In a race umpired by Frederick I. Pitman, Cambridge won by 4 1/2 lengths in a time of 20 minutes 26 seconds. It was their second consecutive victory and their fifth win in six races, taking the overall record in the event to 34–29 in Oxford's favour.

== Background ==
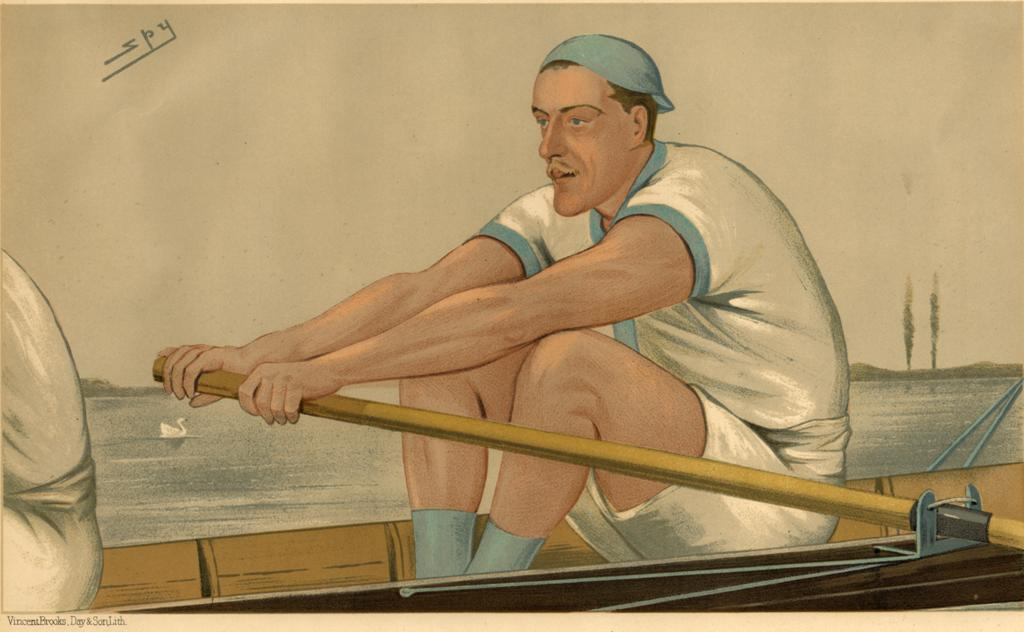
Former Cambridge University Boat Club rower Stanley Muttlebury coached the Light Blues.

The Boat Race is a side-by-side rowing competition between the University of Oxford (sometimes referred to as the "Dark Blues") and the University of Cambridge (sometimes referred to as the "Light Blues"). The race was first held in 1829, and since 1845 has taken place on the 4.2-mile (6.8 km) Championship Course on the River Thames in southwest London. The rivalry is a major point of honour between the two universities; it is followed throughout the United Kingdom and, as of 2015, broadcast worldwide. Cambridge went into the race as reigning champions, having won the 1906 race by 3 1/2 lengths, while Oxford led overall with 34 victories to Cambridge's 28 (excluding the "dead heat" of 1877).

Cambridge were coached by Francis Escombe (for the fourth consecutive year), Stanley Muttlebury, five-time Blue between 1886 and 1890, and David Alexander Wauchope (who had rowed in the 1895 race). Oxford's coaches were Harcourt Gilbey Gold (Dark Blue president for the 1900 race and four-time Blue) and H. W. Willis. The umpire for the fifth year was old Etonian and former Cambridge rower Frederick I. Pitman who rowed in the 1884, 1885 and 1886 races.

== Crews ==
The Cambridge crew weighed an average of 12 st 2.875 lb (77.3 kg), 1.875 pounds (0.9 kg) per rower more than their opponents. Oxford's crew contained three rowers with Boat Race experience, including Henry Bucknall who was rowing in his third consecutive event. Cambridge saw five participants return to their boat, including Banner Johnstone who had rowed in both 1904 and 1906. All of those taking part in the race were registered as British.

Late in the previous summer, and following the Henley Royal Regatta, Cambridge were challenged to a race along the Championship Course by Harvard University: Cambridge won by two lengths. The Light Blues made only two changes to personnel for this year's Boat Race, and as noted by author and former Oxford rower George Drinkwater, "had a crew almost ready-made".

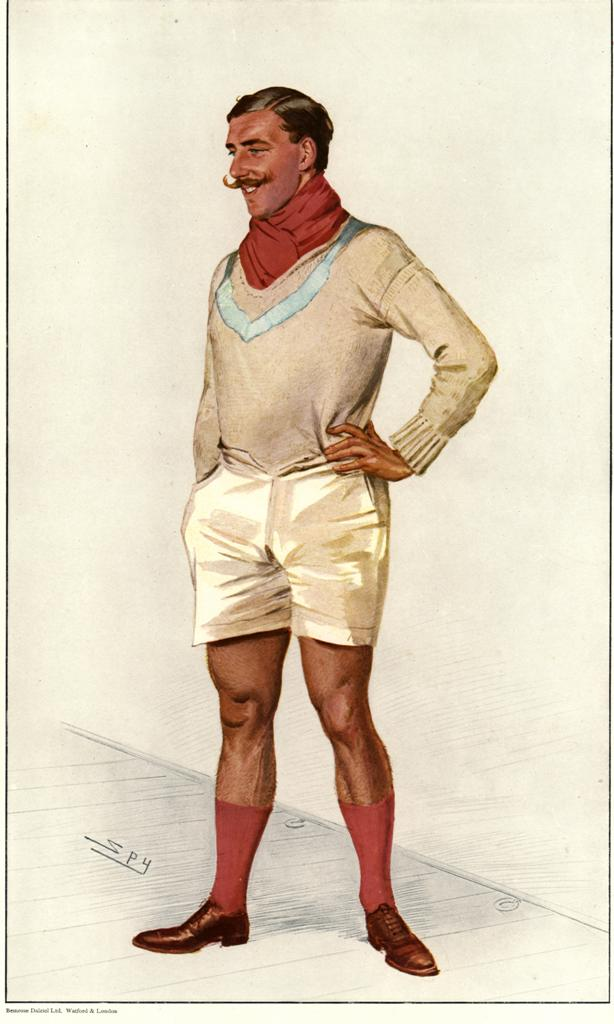
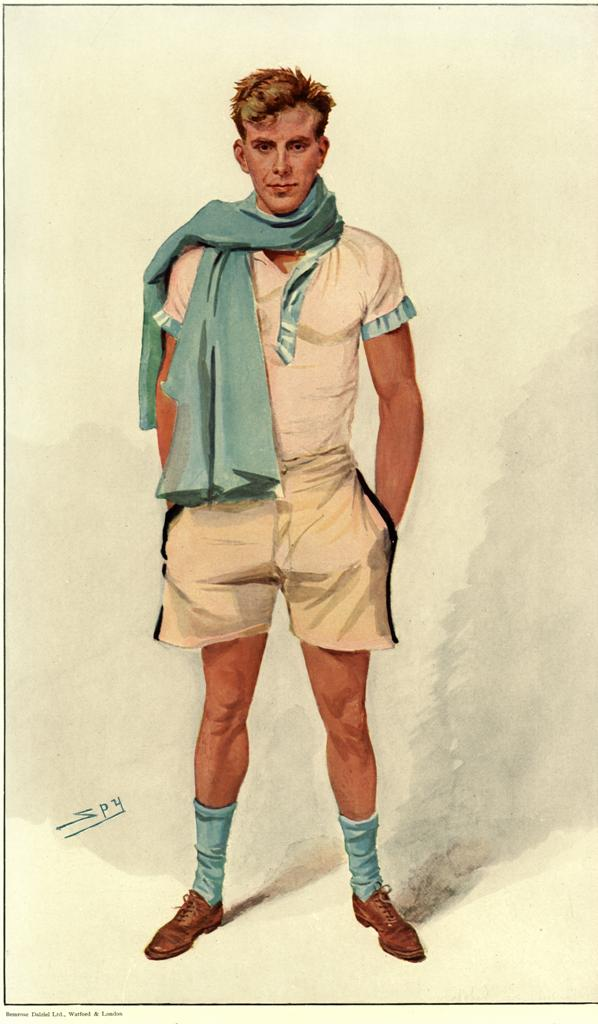
Banner Johnstone (left) rowed at number six for Cambridge while Douglas Stewart rowed at stroke.

Seat	Oxford			Cambridge		
Seat	Name	College	Weight	Name	College	Weight
Bow	W. T. Heard	Balliol	11 st 0 lb	A. B. Close-Brooks	1st Trinity	11 st 0 lb
2	H. C. Bucknall	Merton	11 st 8 lb	J. H. F. Benham	Jesus	12 st 5.5 lb
3	G. E. Hope	Christ Church	12 st 13 lb	H. M. Goldsmith	Jesus	12 st 6 lb
4	R. M. Peat	Trinity	11 st 11 lb	J. S. Burn	1st Trinity	12 st 9.5 lb
5	J. A. Gillan	Magdalen	12 st 7 lb	H. G. Baynes	1st Trinity	14 st 0 lb
6	A. G. Kirby	Magdalen	13 st 10 lb	B. C. Johnstone (P)	3rd Trinity	12 st 9 lb
7	E. H. L. Southwell	Christ Church	11 st 0 lb	E. W. Powell	3rd Trinity	11 st 6 lb
Stroke	A. C. Gladstone	Christ Church	11 st 0 lb	D. C. R. Stuart	Trinity Hall	11 st 1 lb
Cox	A. W. F. Donkin	Magdalen	8 st 5 lb	R. F. R. P. Boyle	Trinity Hall	8 st 10 lb
Source: (P) – boat club president, L. E. Jones acted as Oxford's non-rowing president.

== Race ==
The Championship Course along which the Boat Race is contested

Oxford won the toss and elected to start from the Surrey station, handing the Middlesex side of the river to Cambridge. Although the bend of the river provided the Dark Blues with an early advantage, Cambridge were ahead and clear within a minute and a half. Rating slightly slower than the Dark Blues, they passed the Mile Post two lengths up and held a three-length lead as they passed below Hammersmith Bridge. Oxford's stroke Albert Gladstone spurted in an attempt to draw his boat back into the contest, and stroke by stroke the gap was reduced, eventually to a few feet.

Encountering rough water, Oxford had to work hard to remain in contention but at Chiswick, began to fall back rapidly. Even after reducing their stroke rate, Cambridge pulled further away to lead by four lengths at Barnes Bridge. They eased up to win by 4 1/2 lengths in a time of 20 minutes 26 seconds, their second consecutive victory and their fifth win in six races. It was the largest winning margin since the 1904 race and took the overall record in the event to 34–29 in Oxford's favour.
