= List of Cambridge University Boat Race crews =

This is a list of the Cambridge University crews who have competed in The Boat Race since its inception in 1829.

Rowers are listed left to right in boat position from bow to stroke. The number following the rower indicates the rower's weight in stones and pounds.

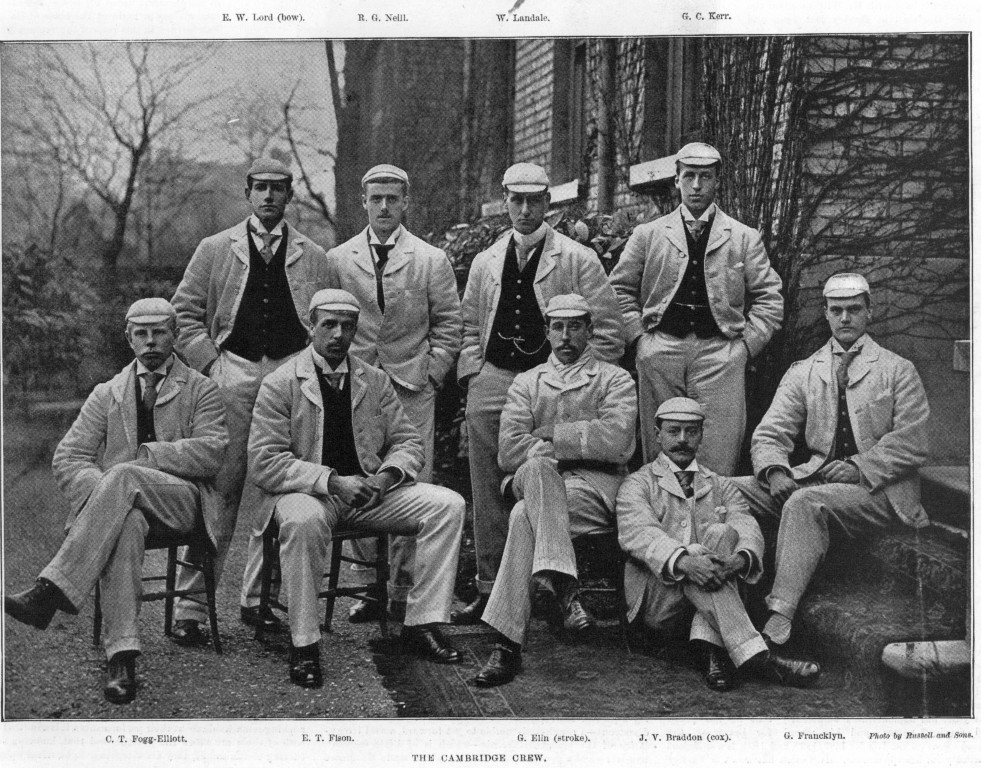
Cambridge University Boat Club VIII, 1892

== 1829–1854 ==
1829–1854
Year	Wins	Crew
1829		A B E Holdsworh, 10. 7; A F Bayford, 10. 8; C Warren, 10.10; C Merivale, 11. 0; T Entwisle, 11. 4; W T Thompson, 11.10; G A Selwyn, 11.13; W Snow, 11. 4; Cox B R Heath, 9. 4
1836	W	W H Solly, 11. 0; F S Green, 11. 2; E S Stanley, 11. 4; P Hartley, 12. 0; W M Jones, 12. 0; J H Keane, 12. 0; A W Upcher, 12. 0; A K B Granville, 11. 7; Cox T S Egan, 9. 0
1839	W	A H Shadwell, 10. 7; W W Smyth, 11. 0; J Abercrombie, 10. 7; A Paris, 11. 4; C Penrose, 12. 0; W H Yatman, 10.10; W B Brett, 12. 0; E S Stanley, 10. 6; Cox T S Egan, 9. 0
1840	W	A H Shadwell, 10. 7; W Massey, 11. 0; S B Taylor, 11. 7; J M Ridley, 12. 8; G C Uppleby, 11.12; F C Penrose, 12. 1; H Jones, 11. 1; C M Vialls, 11. 6; Cox T S Egan, 9. 0
1841	W	W R Crocker, 10.12; Hon. L W Denman, 10.12; A M Ritchie, 11.10; J M Ridley, 12. 7; R H Cobbold, 12. 4; F C Penrose, 12. 0; Hon G Denman, 10. 7; C M Vialls, 11. 7; Cox J M Croker, 10. 8
1842		F E Tower 10. 2; Hon. L W Denman 10.11; W Watson 10.13; F C Penrose 11.10; R H Cobbold 12. 6; Hon G Denman 10. 9; J M Ridley 12. 0; Cox A B Pollock 9. 7
1845	W	G Mann 10. 7; W Harkness 10. 0; W S Lockhart 11. 3; W P Cloves 12. 0; F M Arnold 12. 0; R Harkness 11. 0; J Richardson 12. 0; C G Hill 10.11; Cox H Munster 9. 2
1846	W	G F Murdoch 10. 2; G F Holroyd 11. 1; S T Clissold 12. 0; W P Cloves 12.12; E Wilder 13. 2; R Harkness 11. 6; E P Wolstenholme 11. 1; C G Hill 11. 1; Cox T B Lloyd 9. 8
1849	W	H Proby 9.13; W J H Jones 10.13; A de Rutzen 11. 8; C J Holden 11. 8; W L G Bagshawe 11.10; W H Waddington 11.10; W C Hodgson 11. 2; J C Wray 10.12; Cox G Booth 10. 7
1849Dec		A Baldry 10.10; H E Pellew 11. 0; A de Rutzen 11. 8; C J Holden 11. 8; W L G Bagshawe 12. 0; H J Miller 12. 0; W C Hodgson 11. 3; J C Wray 11. 0; Cox G Booth 10. 8
1852		E Macnaghten 11. 0; H Brandt 11. 5; H E Tuckey 11. 3; H B Foord 12. 6; E Hawley 12. 5; W S Longmore 11. 4; W A Norris 11. 9; F W Johnson 11. 8; Cox C H Crosse 9. 7
1854		R C Galton 10. 2; S Nairne 10. 2; J C Davis 11. 1; S A Agnew 10.12; E Courage 11.13; H F Johnson 10.13; H Blake 11. 1; J Wright 10. 2; Cox C T Smith 9.12

== 1856–1877 ==
1856–1877
Year	Wins	Crew
1856	W	J P King-Salter 9.13; F C Alderson 11. 3; R Lewis-Lloyd 11.12; E H Fairrie 12.10; H Williams 12. 8; J McCormick 13. 0; H Snow 11. 8; H R M Jones 10. 7; Cox W Wingfield 9. 0
1857		A P Holme 11. 8; A Benn 11. 5; W H Holley 11. 8; A L Smith 11. 2; J J Serjeantson 12. 4; R Lewis-Lloyd 11.11; P P Pearson 11. 4; H Snow 11. 8; Cox R Wharton 9. 2
1858	W	H H Lubbock 11. 4; A L Smith 11. 4; W J Havart 11. 4; D Darroch 12. 1; H Williams 12. 4; R Lewis-Lloyd 11.13; A H Fairbairn 11.12; J Hall 10. 7; Cox R Wharton 9. 2
1859	Sank	N Royds 10.13; H J Chaytor 10.13; A L Smith 11.11; D Darroch 12. 4; H Williams 12. 6; R Lewis-Lloyd 11. 9; G A Paley 11. 7; J Hall 10. 2; Cox J T Morland 9. 0
1860	W	S Heathcote10. 3; H J Chaytor 11. 4; D Ingles 10.13; J S Blake 12. 9; M Coventry 12. 8; B N Cherry 12. 1; A H Fairbairn 11.10; J Hall 10. 4; Cox J T Morland 9. 0
1861		G H Richards 10. 4; H J Chaytor 11. 3; W H Tarleton 11. 0; J S Blake 12.10; M Coventry 13. 3; H H Collings 10.11; R U P Fitzgerald 11. 2; J Hall 10. 6; Cox T K Gaskell 8. 3
1862		P F Gorst 10. 4; J G Chambers 11. 8; E Sanderson 10.10; W C Smyly 11. 5; R U P Fitzgerald 11. 3; H H Collings 11. 2; J G Buchanan 10.12; G H Richards 10. 5; Cox F H Archer 5. 2
1863		J C Hawkshaw, 11. 0; W C Smyly, 11. 4; R H Morgan, 11. 3; J B Wilson, 11.10; C H La Mothe, 12. 3; R A Kinglake, 12. 0; J G Chambers, 11. 6; J Stanning, 10. 6; Cox F H Archer, 5. 9
1864		J C Hawkshaw, 11. 3; E V Pigott, 11. 9; H S Watson, 12. 4; W W Hawkins, 12. 0; R A Kinglake, 12. 4; G Borthwick, 12. 1; D F Steavenson, 12. 1; J R Selwyn, 11. 0; Cox F H Archer, 6.
1865		H Watney, 11. 1; M H L Beebee, 10.12; E V Pigott, 11.12; R A Kinglake, 12. 8; D F Steavenson, 12. 4; G Borthwick, 11.13; W R Griffiths, 11. 8; C B Lawes, 11. 7; Cox F H Archer, 7. 3
1866		J Still, 11. 6; J R Selwyn, 11. 6; J U Bourke, 12. 3; H J Fortescue, 12. 2; D F Stevenson, 12. 5; R A Kinglake, 12. 9; H Watney, 10.11; W R Griffiths, 11. 9; Cox A Forbes, 8. 0
1867		W H Anderson, 11. 0; J M Collard, 11. 4; J U Bourke, 12. 9; Hon J H Gordon, 12. 3; F E Cunningham, 12.12; J Still, 11.12; H Watney, 11. 0; W R Griffiths, 12. 0; Cox A Forbes, 8. 2
1868		W H Anderson, 11. 2; J P Nicholls, 11. 3; J G Wood, 12. 6; W H Lowe, 12. 4; H T Nadin, 12.11; W F McMichael, 12. 1; J Still, 12. 1; W J Pinckney, 10.10; T D Warner, 8. 4
1869		J A Rushton, 11. 5; J H Ridley, 11.10; J W Dale, 11.12; F J Young, 12. 4; W F MacMichael, 12. 4; W H Anderson, 11. 4; J Still, 12. 1; J H D Goldie, 12. 1; Cox H E Gordon, 7. 8
1870	W	E S L Randolph, 10.11; J H Ridley, 11. 9; J W Dale, 12. 2; E A A Spencer, 12. 4; W H Lowe, 12. 7; E L Phelps, 12. 1; J F Strachan, 11.13; J H D Goldie, 12, 0; Cox H E Gordon, 7.12
1871	W	J S Follett, 11. 6; John B Close, 11. 8; H J Lomax, 12. 8; E A A Spencer, 12. 9; W H Lowe, 12.10; E L Phelps, 12. 1; E S L Randolph, 11.11; J H D Goldie, 12. 6; Cox H E Gordon, 7.13
1872	W	James B Close, 11. 3; C W Benson, 11. 4; G M Robinson, 11.12; E A A Spencer, 12. 8; C S Read, 12. 8; John B Close, 11.10; E S L Randolph, 11.11; J H D Goldie, 12. 4; Cox C H Roberts, 6. 6
1873	W	James B Close, 11. 3; E Hoskyns, 11. 2; J E Peabody, 11. 7; W C Lecky-Browne, 12. 1; T S Turnbull, 12.12; C S Read, 12.13; C W Benson, 11. 5; H E Rhodes, 11. 1; Cox C H Candy, 7. 5
1874	W	P J Hibbert, 11. 1½; G F Armytage, 11. 8; James B Close, 11. 0½; A S Estcourt, 11.10½; W C Lecky-Browne, 12. 5; J A Aylmer, 12.11; C S Read, 12.11½; H E Rhodes, 11. 7; Cox C H Candy, 7. 5
1875		P J Hibbert, 11. 3; W B Close, 11.10; G C Dicker, 11. 8; W G Michell, 11.11; E A Phillips, 12. 4; J A Aylmer, 12.10; C W Benson, 11. 3; H E Rhodes, 11. 7; Cox G L Davis, 6.10
1876	W	P W Brancker, 11. 3; T W Lewis, 11. 8; W B Close, 11.10; C Gurdon, 12. 9; L G Pike, 12. 9; T E Hockin, 11.13; H E Rhodes, 11.13; C D Shafto, 11. 9; Cox G L Davis, 6.13
1877	DH	B G Hoskyns, 10.11; T G Lewis, 11. 9; J C Fenn, 11. 7; W B Close, 11. 9½; L G Pike, 12. 8; C Gurdon, 12. 13; T E Hockin, 12.11; C D Shafto, 12. 0; Cox G L Davis, 7. 2

== 1878–1899 ==
1878–1899
Year	Wins	Crew
1878		Ll R Jones, 10. 9; J A Watson-Taylor, 11. 9¾; T W Barker, 12. 6; R J Spurrell, 11.13½; L G Pike, 12. 8½; C Gurdon, 12.10½; T E Hockin, 12. 4½; E H Prest, 10.12¾; Cox G L Davis, 7. 5
1879	W	E H Prest, 11. 2; H Sandford, 11. 6¾; A H S Bird, 11. 8; C Gurdon, 13. 0½; T E Hockin, 12. 4¼; C Fairbairn, 12. 7½; T Routledge, 12. 7½; R D Davis, 12. 4½; Cox G L Davis, 7. 7
1880		E H Prest, 10.12; H Sandford, 11. 5½; W Barton, 11. 3½; W M Warlow, 12. 0; C N L Armytage, 12. 2½; R D Davis, 12. 8½; R D Prior, 11.13; W W Baillie, 11. 2½; Cox B S Clarke, 7. 0
1881		R C M G Gridley, 10. 7; H Sandford, 10.10½; J A Watson-Taylor, 12. 3½; P W Atkin, 11.13; E Lambert, 12. 0; A M Hutchinson, 11.13; C W Moore, 11. 9; E C Brooksbank, 11. 8; Cox H Woodhouse, 7. 2
1882		Ll R Jones, 11. 1; A M Hutchinson, 12. 1½; J C Fellowes, 12. 7; P W Atkin, 12. 1½; E Lambert, 11.12; S Fairbairn, 13. 0; C W Moore, 11. 7; S P Smith, 11. 1; Cox P L Hunt, 7. 5
1883		R C M G Gridley, 10.7; F W Fox, 12. 2; C W Moore, 11.13; P W Atkin, 12. 1; F E Churchill, 13. 4; S Swann, 12.12; S Fairbairn, 13. 4; F C Meyrick, 11. 7; Cox P L Hunt, 8. 1
1884	W	R C M G Gridley, 10. 6; G H Eyre, 11. 3½; F Straker, 12. 2; S Swann, 13. 3; F E Churchill, 13. 2½; E W Haig, 11. 6¾; C W Moore, 11.12¾; F I Pitman, 11.11½; Cox C E Tyndale-Biscoe, 8. 2
1885		N P Symonds, 10. 8; W K Hardacre, 10. 9; W H W Perrott, 12. 1; S Swann, 13. 4; F E Churchill, 13. 3; E W Haig, 11. 8; R H Coke, 12. 4; F I Pitman, 11.13; Cox G Wilson, 7.11
1886	W	C J Bristowe, 10. 8½; N P Symonds, 10.10; J Walmsley, 12. 1; A D Flower, 12. 8½; S Fairbairn, 13. 9; S D Muttlebury, 13. 3; Cameron Barclay, 11. 3; F I Pitman, 11.10½; Cox G H Baker, 6. 9
1887	W	R McKenna, 10. 7; Charles T Barclay, 11. 1; P Landale, 12. 0½; J R Orford, 13. 0; S Fairbairn, 13. 5½; S D Muttlebury, 13. 6½; Cameron Barclay, 11. 8; C J Bristowe, 10. 7½; G H Baker, 7. 1
1888	W	R H Symonds-Tayler, 10. 7; L Hannen, 11. 3; R H P Orde, 11. 7; C B P Bell, 12.13½; S D Muttlebury, 13. 7; P Landale, 12. 4; F H Maugham, 11. 5; J C Gardner, 11. 7; Cox J R Roxburgh, 8. 2
1889	W	R H Symonds-Tayler, 10.10½; L Hannen, 11. 4; R H P Orde, 11.10; C B P Bell, 13. 1; S D Muttlebury, 13. 9; P Landale, 12. 8; F H Maugham, 11. 5½; J C Gardner, 11.10; Cox T W Northmore, 7.13
1890		G Elin, 10.9; J M Sladen, 11.12; E T Fison, 12. 6½; J F Rowlatt, 11.12; A. S. Duffield, 12. 9; S D Muttlebury, 13. 9; G Francklyn, 11.12½; J C Gardner, 11.12½; Cox T W Northmore, 7.10½
1891		J W Noble, 11. 5¾; E W Lord, 10.10¼; G Francklyn, 12. 3; E T Fison, 12. 7½; W Landale, 12.11; J F Rowlatt, 11.12; C T Fogg-Elliot, 11. 4; G Elin, 10.13; Cox J V Braddon, 7.12
1892		E W Lord, 10.12; R G Neill, 11.11; G Francklyn, 12. 3; E T Fison, 12. 6½; W Landale, 13. 1; G C Kerr, 12. 1; C T Fogg-Elliot, 11. 8½; G Elin, 10.10; Cox J V Braddon
1893		G. A. H. Branson, 10. 9½; R F Bayford, 11. 9; C T Fogg-Elliott, 11.10½; E H M Waller, 12. 5½; L A E Ollivant, 13. 3½; G C Kerr, 12. 6; R O Kerrison, 12. 0; T G E Lewis, 11.12; Cox C T Agar, 7. 5
1894		A H Finch, 11. 0; N W Paine, 11. 1; Sir Charles Ross, 11. 8; H M Bland, 11. 5; L A E Ollivant, 13. 5¾; C T Fogg-Elliot, 11. 8; R O Kerrison, 11.12; T G E Lewis, 11.12; Cox F C Begg, 8. 0
1895		T B Hope, 10.11; F C Stewart, 12. 1½; H A Game, 12. 2; W S Adie, 13. 2½; T J G Duncanson, 13. 3; R Y Bonsey, 12. 4; A S Bell, 11. 2; D A Wauchope, 11. 9; Cox F C Begg, 8. 9
1896		T B Hope, 11. 1; H A Game, 12. 4; D Pennington, 12. 7; R Y Bonsey, 12.10; W A Bieber, 12.12; T J G Duncanson, 13.12; A S Bell, 11.13; W J Fernie, 11.13; Cox T R Paget-Tomlinson, 8. 4½
1897		D E Campbell-Muir, 11. 5; A S Bell, 12. 1; E J D Taylor, 12.13; B H Howell, 12. 9; W A Bieber, 13. 1; D Pennington, 12. 9; W Dudley Ward,12. 6; W J Fernie, 11.13; Cox E C Hawkins, 8. 1
1898		W B Rennie, 11. 7; J F Beale, 12. 2¾; H G Brown, 13.11¾; S V Pearson, 12. 9¼; A W Swanston, 12.10; R B Etherington-Smith, 12.11¼; C J D Goldie, 12. 0; A S Bell, 12. 2¼; Cox E C Hawkins, 8. 4
1899	W	W H Chapman, 11. 2; N L Calvert, 11.13; C J D Goldie, 12. 1½; J E Payne, 12.10½; R B Etherington-Smith,12.10; R H Sanderson, 12.11; W Dudley Ward, 12. 9½; J H Gibbon, 11. 3½; Cox G A Lloyd, 8. 5

== 1900–1914 ==
1900–1914
Year	Wins	Crew
1900	W	S P Cockerell, 11.10; C J M Adie, 12. 3; B W D Brooke, 10.10¼; J E Payne, 13. 0; R B Etherington-Smith, 12.11¼; R H Sanderson, 12.13¼; W Dudley Ward, 12. 9; J H Gibbon, 11. 8; G A Lloyd, 9. 0
1901		R H Nelson, 11. 3; B C Cox, 12. 0; B W D Brooke, 11. 9½; C W H Taylor, 12. 7½; G Parker, 12. 5½; H B Grylls, 12. 7; E F Duncanson, 12. 7; G M Maitland, 12. 1; Cox E A O A Jamieson, 8. 6
1902	W	W H Chapman, 11. 1½; T Drysdale, 12. 1½; P H Thomas, 12. 2; C W H Taylor, 12. 8; F J Escombe, 12. 7; H B Grylls, 12.10; J Edwards-Moss, 12. 6; R H Nelson, 11. 5; Cox C H S Wasbrough, 8. 2
1903	W	W H Chapman, 10. 7; P H Thomas, 12. 8; S R Beale, 11. 2; C W H Taylor, 13. 0; J S Carter, 13. 4; H B Grylls, 12.13; J Edwards-Moss, 12. 9; R H Nelson, 11. 6; Cox B G A Scott, 8. 0
1904	W	H Sanger, 10. 7; S M Bruce, 12. 0; B C Johnstone, 12. 4; A L Lawrence, 12.13¾; R V Powell, 12. 2¾; P H Thomas, 12. 7; H D Gillies, 10. 5; M V Smith, 10. 5½; Cox B G A Scott, 8. 4
1905		H Sanger, 10. 9; W B Savory, 12. 9; B C Johnstone,12. 4; P H Thomas, 12. 4½; E P W Wedd, 13. 1; B R Winthrop-Smith, 12. 7; R V Powell, 12. 3; C H S Taylor, 10. 4; Cox R Allcard, 8. 6
1906	W	G D Cochrane, 10. 8½; J H F Benham, 11. 6; H M Goldsmith, 12. 6½; M Donaldson, 13. 9½; B C Johnstone, 12. 6½; R V Powell, 12. 6½; E W Powell, 11. 6; D C R Stuart, 11. 1½; Cox A G L Hunt, 8. 0
1907	W	A B Close-Brooks, 11. 0; J H F Benham, 12. 5½; H M Goldsmith, 12. 6; J S Burn, 12. 9½; H G Baynes, 14. 0; B C Johnstone, 12. 9; E W Powell, 11. 6; D C R Stuart, 11.1; Cox R F R P Boyle, 8.10
1908	W	F H Jerwood, 11.10; G E Fairbairn, 11.13; O A Carver, 12.10; H E Kitching, 13. 2; J S Burn, 12.10½; E G Williams, 13.0½; E W Powell, 11. 6; D C R Stuart, 11. 2; Cox R F R P Boyle, 8.10
1909		R W M Swanstone, 10. 4½; H E Swanston, 12. 4; G L Thomson, 12. 6½; H E Kitching, 12.12; E G Williams, 13. 0; J B Rosher, 14. 0; E S Hornidge, 12.13; D C R Stuart, 11. 3; Cox G D Compston, 8.10
1910		R W M Arbuthnot, 10. 5; R Davies, 11.11½; F E Hellyer, 12. 3½; C P Cooke, 12. 9½; E G Williams,13. 2½; J B Rosher, 14. 4; C R le Blanc Smith, 12. 6½; H J S Shields, 11. 5½; C A Skinner, 8. 5
1911		S E Swann, 11. 8; P V G Van der Byl, 12. 2½; F E Hellyer, 12. 0; C F Burnand, 12. 4; C R le Blanc-Smith, 13. 3; J B Rosher, 14. 6½; G E Fairbairn, 11.13; R W M Arbuthnot, 10. 8; C A Skinner, 8.12
1912		R W M Arbuthnot, 10. 9; D C Collins, 11. 7¾; H M Heyland, 12. 4¼; R S Shove, 12. 6½; J H Goldsmith, 12.13½; C R le Blanc Smith, 13. 3; L S Lloyd, 10. 5½; S E Swann, 11. 6; C A Skinner, 8. 3
1913		G A Fisher, 10. 2; S E Swann, 11. 9½; H Roper, 12.10½; W M Askwith, 13.10; C S Clark, 12.13; R S Shove, 12. 8; C E V Buxton, 12. 0; G E Tower, 11.11¼; L E Ridley, 8. 6
1914	W	D I Day, 11. 6; S E Swann, 11.13; P C Livingston 13. 7; J A Ritson, 13. 7; K G Garnett, 13.12; C S Clark, 13. 1; C E V Buxton, 12. 2½; G E Tower, 11.12; L E Ridley, 8. 7

== 1920–1939 ==
1920–1939
Year	Wins	Crew
1920	W	H O C Boret, 12. 1; J H Simpson, 13. 0; A F W Dixon, 12.11; R I L MacEwen, 13. 8; H B Playford, 13. 8; J A Campbell, 13. 5; A Swann, 12. 0½; P H G H-S Hartley, 10.10¼; Cox R T Johnstone, 8.11
1921	W	H O C Boret, 12. 8; A G W Penney, 13. 4; A B Ritchie, 13. 7; A D B Pearson, 13. 7; H B Playford, 13.12; J A Campbell, 13. 4; Hon J W H Fremantle, 12. 0½; P H G H-S Hartley, 11. 1¾; Cox L E Stephens, 8.10
1922	W	T D A Collet, 12. 3; A J Hodgkin, 12. 6½; K N Craig, 12. 8½; A D B Pearson, 13.10½; H B Playford, 13.10½; B G Ivory, 13. 8; Hon J W H Fremantle, 12. 6½; P H G H-S Hartley, 11. 6; Cox L E Stephens, 9. 4
1923		W F Smith, 11. 7½; F W Law, 12.12; K N Craig, 13. 0; S H Heap, 13. 7½; B G Ivory, 13.10; T D A Collet, 12. 7; R E Morrison, 12. 1; T R B Sanders, 11.12; Cox R A L Balfour, 8. 8
1924	W	G E G Goddard, 11. 9½; J S Herbert, 11. 9; J A Macnabb, 11.11¾; G L Elliot-Smith, 13. 2; G H Ambler, 12. 2; T D A Collet,12. 4; C R M Eley, 11. 4; A B Stobart, 11.10½; Cox J A Brown, 7. 7
1925	W	G E G Goddard, 11. 2½; W F Smith, 11.11; H R Carver, 12.11; J S Herbert, 11.10½; G H Ambler, 12. 7; G L Elliot-Smith, 13. 5; S K Tubbs, 11.13; A G Wansbrough, 11. 7; Cox J A Brown, 8. 0
1926	W	M F A Keen, 11. 9; W F Smith, 11. 8; G H Ambler, 12. 5; R B T Craggs, 11.13; Ll V Bevan, 13. 9; J B Bell, 13. 2; S K Tubbs, 12. 4; E C Hamilton-Russell, 11. 8; Cox J A Brown, 8. 6½
1927	W	Hon J S Maclay, 11. 9; T E Letchworth, 11. 7; J C Holcroft, 12. 5; R Beesly, 12.11½; Ll V Bevan, 13. 3½; J B Bell, 13. 3; S K Tubbs, 12. 3; R J Elles, 11. 9; Cox J A Brown, 8.10½
1928	W	R G Michell, 11. 4; N M Aldous, 11.13; M H Warriner, 13. 0; R Beesly, 13. 4; J C Holcroft, 12.13; J B Collins, 14. 3; R A Symonds, 11.12; T E Letchworth, 12. 9; Cox A L Sulley, 8. 6
1929	W	E N Norman-Butler, 12. 0; R J Elles, 12. 4½; R A Davies-Cooke, 12. 1½; R Beesly, 13. 6; M H Warriner, 13. 6; J B Collins, 14. 6; C E Wool-Lewis, 12. 2½; T A Brocklebank, 11.12; Cox A L Sulley, 8.10
1930	W	D Haig-Thomas, 11. 4; H R N Rickett, 12. 6; W A Prideaux 12. 6; P N Carpmael, 12. 7; M H Warriner, 13.10; J B Collins, 14. 5; A S Reeve, 12. 1; T A Brocklebank 11.11½; Cox R E Swartwout, 7. 8
1931	W	D Haig-Thomas, 11. 4½; W A Prideaux, 12. 6; R H H Symonds, 11.12½; G Gray, 13. 5; P N Carpmael, 13. 0; H R N Rickett, 12.10; C J S Sergel, 12. 7; T A Brocklebank, 11. 6; Cox J M Ranking, 6.13
1932	W	D Haig-Thomas, 11. 6; K M Payne, 12. 5; T G Askwith, 11. 8½; W A T Sambell, 12. 6½; C J S Sergel, 12. 9; H R N Rickett, 12.11½; D H E McCowen, 12. 1½; L Luxton, 12. 2¼; Cox J M Ranking, 6.13
1933	W	W L R Carbonell, 12. 4½; J E Gilmour, 12. 0½; T G Askwith, 12. 0½; R B F Wylie, 12.10; C J S Sergel, 12.10; W A T Sambell, 12. 5; C M Fletcher, 12. 9½; T Frame-Thomson, 12. 0; Cox R N Wheeler, 7.12
1934	W	A D Kingsford, 11. 8; C K Buckle, 12. 4½; W G R M Laurie, 13. 6; K M Payne, 12. 6; D J Wilson, 13. 0½; W A T Sambell, 12. 5½; J H T Wilson, 12.13; N J Bradley, 14. 1¼; Cox J N Duckworth, 7.13
1935	W	T R M Bristow, 12. 4; E A Szilagyi, 12. 3; A D Kingsford, 12. 4; J H C Powell, 12. 0; D G Kingsford, 13. 3; M P Lonnon, 12. 8; J H T Wilson, 12.13; W G R M Laurie, 13. 7; Cox J N Duckworth, 7.13
1936	W	T S Cree, 12. 2; H W Mason, 12. 8; G M Lewis, 13. 0; D W Burnford, 13. 4; M P Lonnon, 13. 6; D G Kingsford, 13. 7; J H T Wilson, 13. 0; W G R M Laurie, 13. 6; Cox J N Duckworth, 8. 7
1937		T S Cree, 11. 6; H W Mason, 11. 8; M Bradley, 13. 2; D M W Napier, 12. 9; M P Lonnon, 12.11; T B Langton, 13.11½; A Burrough, 12. 3; R J L Perfitt, 12. 0½; Cox T H Hunter, 8. 0
1938		B T Coulton, 10.13; A M Turner, 11.12; A Burrough, 12. 7; T B Langton, 13. 9; J L L Savill, 12.13; G Keppel, 13. 6; A Campbell, 12. 4; D S M Eadie, 12. 1; Cox T H Hunter, 8. 7
1939	W	C N C Addison, 12. 0½; A M Turner, 12. 3; *A Burrough, 12. 7; J L L Savill, 13. 2; H Parker, 12.13; J Turnbull, 13.12; M Buxton, 12.13; C B Sanford, 12. 1; Cox H T Smith, 8.11

== 1940–1945 unofficial wartime races ==
1940–1945
Year	Wins	Crew
1940	W	E P Hawthorne, 10. 2; K L Lea-Wilson, 11. 11; J E G Wardrop, 12. 10; *A W Laurie, 12. 11; G E W Holley, 13. 0; W M Turnbull, 13. 3; W G Billington, 12. 11; C B Sanford, 12. 0; Cox A Champion, 8. 4
1943		P F Fischer; *T A Wotherspoon; C G W Pilkington; S S Uralli; A Cameron; D Hadfield; J K Byrom; I K H Douglas; Cox B G Sanders
1944		I *H Phillipps, 11. 3; H B Cochrane, 11. 0; J N Capener, 11. 0; M D Whitworth, 11. 5; J J Scott, 14. 2; J H Garson, 13. 0; D A Ramsay, 11. 12; T A Wotherspoon, 12. 10; Cox G D S MacLellan, 9. 8
1945	W	D B J Wardle, 10. 8; Q des Clayes 11. 2; J Paton-Philip, 11. 6; F W R Copeland, 11. 6; D C H Garrod, 12. 4; P C M Nissen, 11. 10; B C Heywood, 11. 5; M D Whitworth, 11. 2; Cox N W Bailey, 8. 6

== 1946–1970 ==
1946–1970
Year	Wins	Crew
1946		*J S Paton-Philip, 12. 0; T J Sullivan, 12. 0; P L P Macdonnell, 13. 2½; D J D Perrins, 12. 2; G E C Thomas, 13. 9; J G Gosse, 12. 3; M S Allman-Ward, 13. 4; J H Neame, 11. 7; Cox G H C Fisher, 9. 1½
1947	W	A P Mellows, 11.12; D J C Meyrick, 11. 0; N S Rogers, 12. 9; P J Garner, 11.12; W A D Windham, 13. 4; I M Lang, 13. 8; A S F Butcher, 11.13; G C Richardson, 12.10; Cox G H C Fisher, 8.10
1948	W	A P Mellows, 12. 1; D J C Meyrick, 11. 4; P A de Giles, 12. 3; *G C Richardson, 12.11; A B C Harrison, 13.12; E A P Bircher, 13. 8; M C Lapage, 13. 0; C B R Barton, 11.11; Cox K T Lindsay, 8.13
1949	W	G S S Ludford, 11. 2; A L Macleod, 12. 4; C B M Lloyd, 13. 0; J R la T Corrie, 13. 3; *E A P Bircher, 13. 7; P M O Massey, 13. 8; D V Lynch-Odhams, 13. 1; D M Jennens, 12. 4; Cox T R Ashton, 9. 3
1950	W	H H Almond, 10. 6; D M Jennens, 12. 4; *A L Macleod, 12. 9; P M O Massey, 13. 9; W T Arthur, 13. 0; E A P Bircher, 13. 6; C B M Lloyd, 12. 9; J L M Crick, 12. 8; Cox A C R Armstrong-Jones, 8. 8
1951	W	H H Almond, 10. 4; D D Macklin, 11.11; J G P Crowden, 12. 7½; R F A Sharpley, 13. 5; E J Worlidge, 12.13½; *C B M Lloyd, 12.12½; W A D Windham, 12.12; D M Jennens, 12. 7; Cox J F K Hinde, 9. 4
1952		E J N T Coghill, 12. 4; G A H Cadbury, 12. 2; *J G P Crowden, 12. 8; G T Marshall, 13. 6½; J R Dingle, 14. 0; R F A Sharpley, 13. 8; N B M Clack, 12. 9; J S M Jones, 11.12½; Cox J F K Hinde, 9. 3
1953	W	J A N Wallis, 11.12½; J S M Jones, 12. 3; J R A MacMillan, 13. 0½; *G T Marshall, 13. 5; D A T Leadley, 13. 3½; L B McCagg, 13. 0; J M King, 12. 8½; P D Hall, 12. 6; Cox B M Eddy, 8.10
1954		*J A N Wallis, 12. 0; J C G Stancliffe, 12. 3; D K Hill, 12. 6; K A Masser, 14. 0; M G Baynes, 13. 1; C M Davies, 13.13; J N Bruce, 12. 1; M J Marshall, 11.10; Cox J W Tanburn, 8. 9
1955	W	*D K Hill, 12. 4; P du Bois, 13. 3; A A M Mays-Smith, 14. 0; K A Masser, 13.12; S G D Tozer, 13.12; R A G Monks, 13. 9½; J J Vernon, 12. 4; A R Muirhead, 12. 2; Cox G T Harris, 9. 4
1956	W	J A L Russell, 12. 4; J F Hall-Craggs, 12. 7; M J H Nightingale, 13. 6; A A M Mays-Smith, 14. 5½; I W Welsh, 13. 2; *K A Masser, 13.12; M G Baynes, 13. 3; M G Delahooke, 12.11; Cox J P M Denny, 10. 0
1957	W	M H Bartlett, 11. 8; C J Pumphrey, 12. 1; J A Pitchford, 13. 8; T P A Norman, 13. 6; J R Meadows, 14. 0; *M G Delahooke, 13. 0; R J M Thompson, 12. 5; F C S Clayre, 12.6; Cox R C Milton, 9. 4
1958	W	A T Denby, 12. 4; J R Giles, 12. 7; *J A Pitchford, 13.10; R D Carver, 13. 3; R B Ritchie, 14. 2; P D Rickett, 13. 6; D C Christie, 13.12; M B Maltby, 12. 9; Cox J S Sulley, 8. 8
1959		J R Owen, 11. 8; J R Giles, 12. 8; T C Heywood-Lonsdale, 13. 6; B M P Thompson-McCausland, 12. 9; G H Brown, 13. 9; J Beveridge, 13. 1; D C Christie, 14. 2; *M B Maltby, 12. 9; Cox J S Sulley, 8. 9
1960		J R Owen, 11. 8; S R M Price, 12. 0; F P T Wiggins, 12.12½; J Parker, 12. 8; *G H Brown, 13. 11½; J Beveridge, 13. 2; E T C Johnstone, 12.12; P W Holmes, 12. 5; Cox R T Weston, 9. 1
1961	W	R G Nicholson, 12. 0; J E Gobbett, 12. 7; R J Fraser, 13. 7; A J Collier, 13. 0; D W G Calder, 12.13; *J Beveridge, 13. 5; M W Christian, 12. 8; M Hoffman, 12. 5; Cox R T Weston, 8.12
1962	W	*R G Nicholson, 12. 4; C J T Davey, 11. 6; R A Napier, 13. 0; A J Collier, 13. 4; J M S Lecky, 14. 1; H B Budd, 15. 1; J N L Tollemache, 13. 9; Lord Chewton, 11. 3; Cox R Walmsley, 9. 0
1963		P J Webb, 11. 0; M V Bevan, 12. 9½; A V Cooke, 12.13½; B J R Jackson, 12. 7½; J Maasland, 14. 1½; M H Beckett, 13. 0½; D F Legget, 12. 6; *Lord Chewton, 10.12; Cox F G G de Rancourt, 9. 0
1964	W	D F Legget, 12.10; M V Bevan, 13. 2; M Muir-Smith, 14. 0; J W Fraser, 14. 2; J M S Lecky, 14. 3; J R Kiely, 14. 0; A Simpson, 12.13; *C J T Davey, 11. 8; Cox R G Stanbury, 8.10
1965		J A Fell, 13. 0; D J Roberts, 13. 6; M W J Carter, 13. 11½; *J W Fraser, 14. 4; R G Ward, 14.10; W E Church, 13.10; D P Moore, 13. 3; M A Sweeney, 12. 8; Cox R G Stanbury, 9. 2
1966		M E K Graham, 13. 7; M D Tebay, 13. 4; J H Ashby, 13. 2; P G R Delafield, 14. 8; R G Ward, 14.12; P H Conze, 12.10; L M Henderson, 13. 6; *M A Sweeney, 12.10; Cox I A B Brooksby, 9. 0
1967		*L M Henderson, 13. 5; C D C Challis, 13. 6; R D Yarrow, 13. 9; G C M Leggett, 13. 3; P G R Delafield, 14. 9; N J Hornsby, 14. 9; D F Earl, 13.11; R N Winckless, 13. 9; Cox W R Lawes, 8.13
1968	W	R C W Church, 12. 3; R N Winckless, 13. 9; J H Reddaway, 13. 8; C S Powell, 14.13; *P G R Delafield, 14. 7; N J Hornsby, 14. 5; G C M Leggett, 12.12; G F Hall, 12. 0; Cox C J Gill, 8. 9
1969	W	C M Robson, 11. 9; *R N Winckless, 13.13; C W Daws, 13. 4; D L Cruttenden, 15.11; C S Powell, 14.12; N J Hornsby, 14. 9; T M Redfern, 13. 2; G F Hall, 11.12; Cox C B Murtough, 8. 6
1970	W	J F S Hervey-Bathurst, 13. 1½; C L Baillieu, 13. 5; A C Buckmaster, 13. 8; C J Rodrigues, 13. 2; C J Dalley, 14. 5½; *D L Cruttenden, 16. 0; C M Lowe, 13. 7; S N S Robertson, 12. 3½; Cox N G Hughes, 8. 9

== 1971–1999 ==
1971–1999
Year	Wins	Crew
1971	W	G J O Phillpotts, 11.11; C L Baillieu, 13. 5; J F S Hervey-Bathurst, 13. 4; N W James, 13.10; B A Sullivan, 14. 7; D L Maxwell, 13. 1; S R Waters III, 13. 8;* C J Rodrigues, 13. 6; Cox N G Hughes, 8.11
1972	W	R J S Clarke, 13. 1; C L Baillieu, 13.13; S G I Kerruish, 12.10; J A Hart, 13. 5; N W James, 14. 0; G A Cadwalader, 14.10; M J Hart, 14. 2; D L Maxwell, 14. 6; Cox *N G Hughes, 9. 1
1973	W	J D Lever, 12.10; H R Jacobs, 13. 6; R P B Duncan, 13.10; *C L Baillieu, 13.10; D P Sturge, 13.10; M O'K Webber, 13.10; S C Tourek, 14. 4; M J Hart, 13.12; Cox M D Williams, 9. 3
1974		*R P B Duncan, 13. 8; H R Jacobs, 13. 6; D J Walker, 13. 9; D B Sprague, 13. 2; J H Smith, 14.12; J H Clay, 13. 4; T F Yuncken, 12.12; N C A Bradley, 12. 3; Cox H J H Wheare, 8.11
1975	W	C Langridge, 13. 7; N C A Bradley, 12.11; J H Clay, 13. 4; A F U Powell, 13. 2; *S C Tourek, 14. 8; J Macleod, 14. 5; P J Robinson, 13. 6; A N Christie, 14. 7; Cox D J T Kitchin, 8.12
1976		D J Searle, 12. 7; R R A Breare, 14. 6; M R Gritten, 14. 0; M P Wells, 14.12; P B Davies, 14. 1; R M Cashin, 14.12; *J H Clay, 12.11; R Harpum, 12. 4; Cox J P Manser, 9. 5
1977		N G Burnet, 11. 11; R A Waterer, 13. 1; *D J Searle, 12. 6; A E Cooke-Yarborough, 14. 4; R C Ross, 14. 1; C M Horton, 14. 0; M D Bathurst, 13. 6; S J Clegg, 12.10; Cox J P Manser, 9.11
1978		M D Bathurst, 13. 4; S J Clegg, 13. 6; W M R Dawkins, 14. 5; *C M Horton, 14. 1; R C Ross, 14. 7; A E Cooke-Yarborough, 14. 8; A N de M Jelfs, 13. 3; R N E Davies, 12. 2; Cox G Henderson, 8. 5
1979		*S J Clegg, 13. 0; A H Gray, 13. 1; A G Phillips, 12.12; J S Palmer, 14. 2; A N de M Jelfs, 13. 4; P W Cross, 12.11; R C Ross, 14. 4; R N E Davies, 12. 5; Cox G Henderson, 8. 8
1980		L W J Baart, 13. 4; M F Panter, 14. 1; T W Whitney, 13. 7; J H C Laurie, 13.12; A G Phillips, 13. 5½; *J W Woodhouse, 13. 9; J S Palmer, 14. 8; A D Dalrymple, 12. 8; Cox C J Wigglesworth, 7.13½
1981		L W J Baart, 13. 2; M F Panter, 13.12; M J S Clark, 13. 9; M P Cowie, 13. 7; A G Philips, 13. 0; *J S Palmer, 14. 5; A D Dalrymple, 12.12; Cox C J Wigglesworth, 8. 0
1982		P St J Brine, 12. 9; A R Knight, 12. 8; *R J S Stephens, 13.12; N J Bliss, 13.10; B M Philp, 15. 3; C D Heard, 14.10; E M G Pearson, 12. 1; S A Harris, 11. 5; Cox I Bernstein, 7. 2
1983		E M D Pearson, 12. 10; A R Knight 12. 9; B M Philp, 15. 5; C D Heard 15. 7; S W Berger 15. 5; P R W Sheppard, 15. 1; J L D Garret, 14. 7; *S A Harris, 11. 10; Cox I Bernstein, 7. 10
1984		A H Reynolds, 12. 2; A R Knight, 12. 5; *S W Berger, 14. 10½; G A Barnard, 12. 11; J L D Garrett, 14. 4; J M Pritchard, 13. 9; E M G Pearson, 12. 5; J D Kinsella, 12. 11; Cox P M Hobson, 7. 6
1985		J S Witter, 12. 11; M L Pasternak, 13. 0; J D Hughes, 13. 10; P H Broughton, 14. 7; S M Peel, 14. 5; G A Barnard, 13. 2; *J L Garret, 14. 8; J M Pritchard, 13. 2; Cox H L Shaw, 6. 2
1986	W	I R Clarke, 12. 9; M Wilson, 12. 9; J D Hughes, 13. 10; J S Pew, 15. 11; S M Peel, 14. 0; P H Broughton, 13. 11; E A F Gibson, 14. 3; J M Pritchard, 14. 11; Cox C A Burton, 6. 9
1987		I R Clarke, 12. 6½; R A B Spink, 14. 0½; N J Grundy, 12. 9; M J Brittin, 14. 8½; *S M Peel, 13. 8½; J S Pew, 14. 13; J A Garman, 14. 2; P H Broughton, 14. 1; Cox J M Wolfson, 8. 12
1988		R S N Ames, 14. 0½; M J K Smith, 14. 8; J C T Pepperell, 15. 2; R A B Spink, 13. 12; *J R Garman, 14. 6; G R Pooley, 13. 7½; N J Grundy, 12. 2½; M J Brittin, 14. 7; Cox S J Loveridge, 8. 11½
1989		I R Clarke, 13. 4; M J K Smith, 14. 12; P M Mant, 15. 3; *M J Brittin, 14. 12; T Backhouse, 16. 11; N Justicz, 14. 8; J R Garman, 14. 11; G R Pooley, 14. 7; Cox Leigh Weiss, 7. 6
1990		R C Young, 12. 13; R J Staite, 11. 3; D E Hole, 13. 3; E C Clark, 11. 10; *P M Mant, 14. 3; G R Pooley, 12. 11; S L Fowler, 12. 12; A J Wright, 13. 2; Cox L Ross-Magenty, 7. 10
1991		R A B Smith, 12. 10; *R J Staite, 11. 4; M C J Justicz, 13. 8; G R Pooley, 13. 3; K St C Allen, 13. 2; D R Gillard, 14. 6; N J Clarry, 12. 11; A J Wright, 13. 6; Cox A J L Bracey, 7 12
1992		*M C J Justicz, 13. 6½; N J Clarry, 13. 1; J H J Behrens, 13. 2½; D R M Justicz, 13. 3; D N Fawcett, 15. 4; D R Gillard, 14. 7½; S L Fowler, 13. 4; D E Bangert, 12. 10½; Cox A W N Probert, 7. 11
1993	W	D E Bangert, 12. 9; D R Gillard, 13 2½; *J H J Behrens, 13 10½; R C Phelps, 14. 0; J Bernstein, 14 8½; M P Baker, 14 2½; S M Gore, 15 1; W T M Mason, 12. 9; Cox M N Haycock, 7. 9½
1994	W	R D Taylor, 14. 0½; W T M Mason, 13. 6; S M Gore, 15. 8; R C Phelps, 14. 3½; *J A Bernstein, 15. 0; M H W Parish, 14. 6; P J M Höltzenbein, 14. 2½; T Streppelhoff, 14. 1; Cox M N Haycock, 7. 12½
1995	W	R D Taylor, 14. 4; *R C Phelps, 14. 1; S B Newton, 14. 1; S A Brownlee, 14. 8; D E Bangert, 13. 0; M H W Parish, 14. 7; M Banovic, 14. 12; M P C Barnett, 13. 7; Cox R S Slatford, 8. 1½
1996	W	J R Elliott, 13. 6; M P C Barnett, 13. 12; N J Burfitt, 14. 0; S J Dawson-Bowling, 15. 0; *E D Ayer, 15. 6; H G C Clarke, 13. 4; R M Waller, 13. 5; J F E Ball, 13. 6; Cox K Whyman, 8. 0½
1997	W	* D J Cassidy, 13. 8½; R J Pim, 13. 5½; E D Ayer, 15. 6; R E B Crombie, 14. 10½; A P Story, 16. 0; A R Watson, 13. 6; D P S Maltrap, 13. 7½; J F E Ball, 13. 2; K Whyman, 7. 13
1998	W	G D C R Smith, 14. 7; P A Cunningham, 13. 6½; J G Bull, 16. 1; B Crombie, 14. 10; T J Wallace, 14. 12; A P Story, 15. 12; S F Forster, 16. 2; M Weber, 13. 11½; Cox A J Potts
1999	W	T J Wallace, 15. 7; T A Stallard, 13. 8; *R E B Crombie, 15. 2; A J West, 15. 2; D O M Ellis, 14. 6; K M West, 14. 11; G D C R Smith, 14. 5; T Wooge, 15. 4; Cox V Sharif

== 2000–2019 ==
2000–2019
Year		Crew
2000		R P Cantwell, 12. 9; J J O'Loughlen, 13. 4; R A Ehlers, 14. 5; H N F Martin, 13. 10½; A J West, 15. 4; T A Stallard, 13. 2½; D J Tweedie, 13. 4; *R P Stokes, 13. 2; Cox G J Glassman, 7. 5
2001	W	C J C Swainson, 13. 6½; L P Hirst, 14. 3; T M Edwards-Moss, 13. 9; R C E C Dunn, 14. 13; A J West, 15. 7; *K M West, 15. 8½; T A Stallard, 13. 8; T Wooge, 15. 9; Cox C A Cormack, 8. 9½
2002		*T A Stallard, 13. 9½; S W Brooks, 14. 4; J A Livingston, 14. 13; S Mayer, 13. 13; A J West, 15. 6½; L P Hirst, 14. 7; S T Welch, 14. 2; R C E C Dunn, 15. 1½; Cox E L Griggs
2003		B Smith, 13. 6½; M Kleinz, 13. 4; H Mallinson, 15. 3; K Coventry, 14. 1½; A McGarel-Groves, 15. 1; T James, 13. 5; J Livingston, 14. 9½; *T Wooge, 15. 12½; Cox J Omartian, 8. 9½
2004	W	C le Neve Foster, 13. 13; K Coventry, 14. 1; H Mallinson, 14. 12; S Mayer, 13. 9½; A Shannon, 14. 2½; S Buschbacher, 15. 7; *W Pommen, 13. 0; N Kirk, 14. 3; Cox K Richardson, 8. 9½
2005		L Walton, 12. 10½; T Edwards, 13. 8½; H Adams, 14. 12; S Buschbacher, 15. 8½; S Schulte, 15. 2; M Kleinz, 13. 7½; T James, 13. 10½; B Heidicker, 13. 2½; Cox P Rudge, 8. 9
2006		L Walton, 13. 5; *T Edwards, 14. 0; S Thormann, 14. 7; T Engelmann, 15. 7; S Schulte, 14. 5; K West, 15. 6; T James, 13. 6; K McDaniel, 13. 6; Cox P Rudge, 8. 9
2007	W	K McDaniel, 14. 3; D O'Shaughnessy, 15. 11; P Champion, 15. 2; J Cornelius, 15. 7; *T James, 13. 11; K West, 16. 0; S Schulte, 15. 11, T Engelmann, 17. 6; Cox R Dowbiggin, 7. 12
2008		C Scott, 13. 8; T Perkins, 15. 0; H Pelly, 13. 12; T Garnett, 14. 10; P Marsland, 16. 0; T Ransley, 15. 10; T Edwards, 13. 11; R Monaghan, 14. 2; Cox R Dowbiggin, 7. 9
2009		R Weitemeyer, 13. 3; *H Pelly, 13. 12; D McEachern, 15. 2; P Marsland, 17. 5; R Monaghan, 14. 7; H Cubasch, 15. 6; T Ransley, 15. 4; S Stafford, 14. 2; Cox R Dowbiggin, 7. 12
2010	W	R Weitemeyer, 13. 1; G Roth, 14. 2; G Nash, 15. 4; P McClelland, 14. 13; *D McEachern, 15. 6; H Pelly, 14. 7; D Rasmussen, 12. 11; F Gill, 15. 6; Cox E Randolph, 8. 9
2011		M Thorp, 13. 13; J Jennings, 15. 6½; D Rix-Standing, 14. 0; H Cubasch, 15. 10; G Nash, 15. 5; G Roth, 14. 6; *D Rasmussen, 12. 11½; D Nelson, 14. 13; Cox E Box, 8. 4
2012	W	*D Nelson, 14. 9; M Schramm, 14. 6; J Lindemann, 14. 13; A Ross, 16. 1; M Thorp, 14. 6; S Dudek, 17. 4; A Scharp, 15. 1; N Garratt, 14. 7; Cox E Bosson, 8. 11
2013		G Wilson, 14. 2½; M Bruncvík, 13. 1; A Fleming, 15. 5; T Otto, 14. 4; *G Nash, 14. 13; S Dudek, 16. 6; A Scharp, 14. 6; N Garratt, 13. 8½; Cox H Fieldman, 8. 8
2014		M Thorp, 13. 12; L Juckett, 13. 4; I Dawkins, 14. 1; *S Dudek, 15. 13; H Gruetjen, 15. 10; M Jackson, 14. 12; J Hooper, 14. 7; H Hoffstot, 14. 2; Cox I Middleton, 8. 6
2015		J Holst, 13. 9½; L Juckett, 13. 6; J Hooper, 14. 8; *A Leichter, 15. 8; W Warr, 14. 11½; M Jackson, 14. 11; B Ruble, 13. 5;H Hoffstot, 14. 5; Cox I Middleton, 8. 6
2016	W	F Newman, 13. 1; A Abbasi, 13. 13; C Fisher, 14. 6; C Auersperg, 14. 3; L Juckett, 12. 13; *H Hoffstot, 14. 8; B Ruble, 13. 2; L Tredell, 14. 12; Cox I Middleton, 8. 7
2017		B Ruble, 13. 10; F Davidson, 12. 13; J Letten, 16. 11; T Tracey, 15. 5; A Malowany, 15. 5; P Eble, 14. 3; *L Tredell, 14. 12; H Meek, 15. 0; Cox H Ramambason, 8. 10
2018	W	P Elwood, 13. 4; C Fisher, 14. 3; D Alizadeh, 14. 2; J Letten, 16. 8; S Furey, 14. 1; F Meeks, 13. 8; R Hurn, 13. 6; F Davidson, 13. 0; Cox *H Ramambason, 8. 7
2019	W	D Bell, 13. 4; J E Cracknell, 14. 2; G Bitler, 15. 1; *D Alizadeh, 14. 5; C Sullivan, 13. 12; S Hookway, 14. 0; F Davidson, 13. 7; N Węgrzycki-Szymczyk, 14. 12; Cox M Holland, 8. 9

== 2020–present ==
2020 onwards
Year		Crew
2020	‡	A Goff; J Page; B Freeman; P Horton; C Sullivan; *F Davidson; J Bernard; A Doyle; C Marcus+
2021	W	T Weinberger; B Dyer; S Benzecry; Q Richardson; G Holden; Parish; *C Sullivan; D Taylor; C Marcus+
2022		L Ferraro; J Hunter; G Finlayson; S Schürch; J Bernard; T George; O Wynne-Griffith; O Parish; C Marcus+
2023	W	M Edge; N Mayhew; N Mouelle; B Taylor; T Lynch; S Benzecry; O Parish; L Ferraro; J Parish+
2024	W	*S Benzecry; N Mouelle; T Marsh; A John; K Coplan; T Lynch; L Ferraro; M Edge; E Bracey+
2025	W	S Hatcher; N Mouelle; L Beever; G Mahler; G Bourne; J Robson; *L Ferraro; D de Graaf; O Boyne+
2026	W	S Hatcher; *N Mouelle; K Fram; P Wild; G Obholzer; A McClean; W Klipstine; F Breuer; S Houdaigui+

== Key ==
- DH = Dead heat
- W = Won
- + = Coxswain
- *= President
- ‡ Cancelled due to the COVID-19 pandemic after the crews were announced.

== See also ==
- List of Oxford University Boat Race crews
- theboatraces.org
