= The Boat Race 1906 =

63rd Boat Race
- Date: 7 April 1906
- Winner: Cambridge
- Margin of victory: 3 1/2 lengths
- Winning time: 19 minutes 25 seconds
- Overall record (Cambridge–Oxford): 28–34
- Umpire: Frederick I. Pitman (Cambridge)

The 63rd Boat Race took place on 7 April 1906. Held annually, the Boat Race is a side-by-side rowing race between crews from the Universities of Oxford and Cambridge along the River Thames. Oxford went into the race as reigning champions, having won the previous year's race, and their crew was slightly heavier than their opponents. In a race umpired by Frederick I. Pitman, Cambridge won by 3 1/2 lengths in a time of 19 minutes 25 seconds, the fastest winning time for four years. The win took the overall record to 34–28 in Oxford's favour.

== Background ==
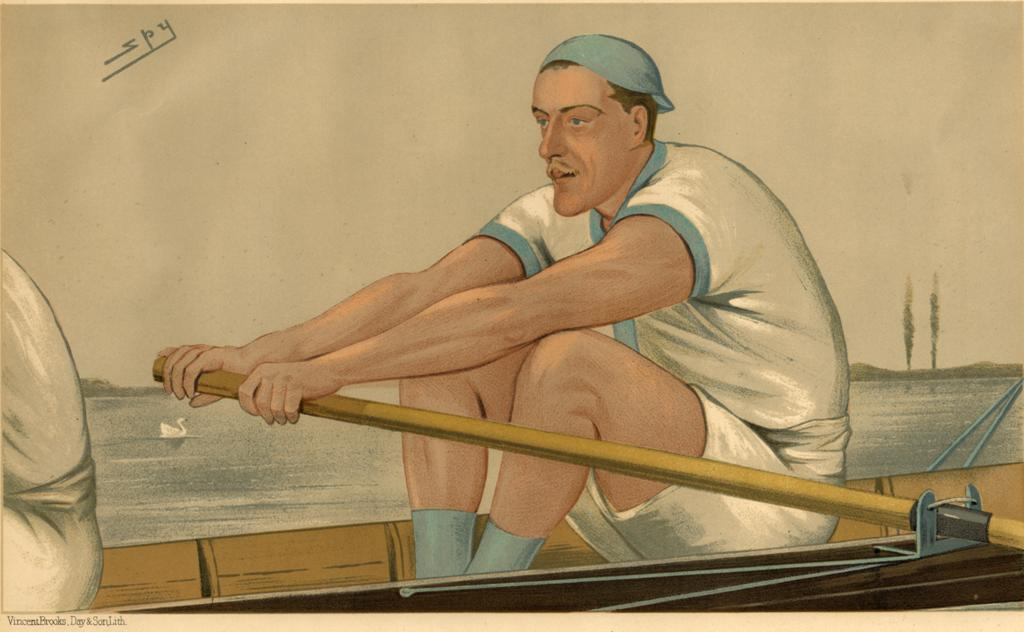
Former Cambridge University Boat Club rower Stanley Muttlebury coached the Light Blues.

The Boat Race is a side-by-side rowing competition between the University of Oxford (sometimes referred to as the "Dark Blues") and the University of Cambridge (sometimes referred to as the "Light Blues"). The race was first held in 1829, and since 1845 has taken place on the 4.2-mile (6.8 km) Championship Course on the River Thames in southwest London. The rivalry is a major point of honour between the two universities; it is followed throughout the United Kingdom and, as of 2015, broadcast worldwide. Oxford went into the race as reigning champions, having won the 1905 race by three lengths, and led overall with 34 victories to Cambridge's 27 (excluding the "dead heat" of 1877).

Cambridge were coached by Francis Escombe (for the third consecutive year), Stanley Muttlebury, five-time Blue between 1886 and 1890, and David Alexander Wauchope (who had rowed in the 1895 race). Oxford's coaches were William Fletcher, who rowed for them in the 1890, 1891, 1892 and 1893 races and Harcourt Gilbey Gold (Dark Blue president for the 1900 race and four-time Blue). The umpire for the fourth year was old Etonian and former Cambridge rower Frederick I. Pitman who rowed in the 1884, 1885 and 1886 races.

== Crews ==
The Oxford crew weighed an average of 12 st 3.5 lb (77.6 kg), 4.125 pounds (1.9 kg) per rower more than their opponents. The Cambridge crew included two rowers with Boat Race experience, in Banner Johnstone and Ronald Powell, both of whom were rowing in their third consecutive event. Powell was rowing alongside his brother Eric. Oxford's crew contained four who had represented their university in the event, including E. P. Evans who was making his third appearance. All of the participants in the race were registered as British.

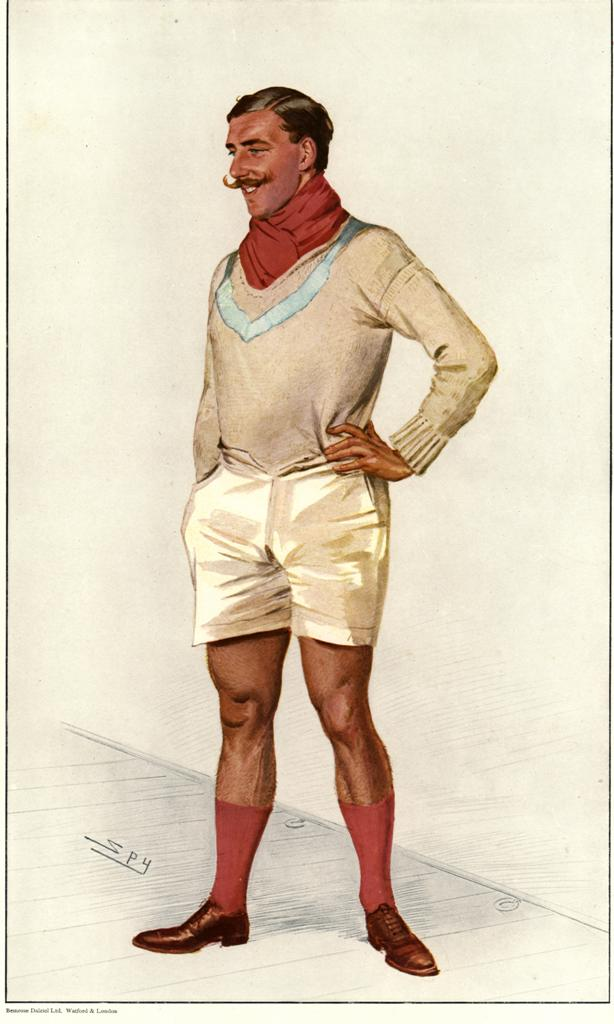
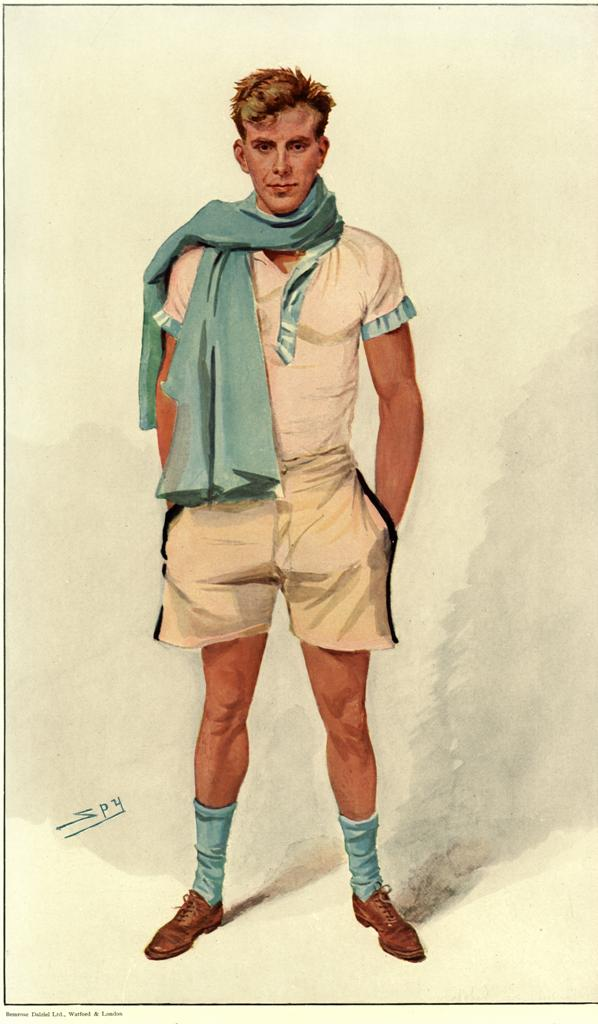
Banner Johnstone (left) rowed at number seven for Cambridge while Douglas Stewart rowed at stroke.

Seat	Oxford			Cambridge		
Seat	Name	College	Weight	Name	College	Weight
Bow	G. M. A. Graham	New College	10 st 13.5 lb	G. D. Cochrane	3rd Trinity	10 st 8.5 lb
2	C. H. Illingworth	Pembroke	12 st 0 lb	J. H. F. Benham	Jesus	11 st 6 lb
3	J. Dewar	New College	12 st 4.5 lb	H. M. Goldsmith	Jesus	12 st 6.5 lb
4	L. E. Jones	Balliol	13 st 13 lb	M. Donaldson	1st Trinity	13 st 9.5 lb
5	A. G. Kirby	Magdalen	13 st 7.5 lb	B. C. Johnstone	3rd Trinity	12 st 6.5 lb
6	E. P. Evans (P)	University	13 st 6 lb	R. V. Powell (P)	3rd Trinity	12 st 6.5 lb
7	A. C. Gladstone	Christ Church	10 st 7.5 lb	E. W. Powell	3rd Trinity	11 st 6 lb
Stroke	H. C. Bucknall	Merton	11 st 4.5 lb	D. C. R. Stuart	Trinity Hall	11 st 1.5 lb
Cox	L. P. Stedall	Merton	8 st 5 lb	A. G. L. Hunt	Lady Margaret Boat Club	8 st 0 lb
Source: (P) – boat club president

== Race ==
The Championship Course along which the Boat Race is contested

Oxford won the toss and elected to start from the Surrey station, handing the Middlesex side of the river to Cambridge. According to former Oxford rower and author George Drinkwater, the Light Blues went into the race as "firm favourites". Conditions were described as "very fast, a strong tide and no wind". Umpire Pitman started the race at noon, and Cambridge led from the first stroke.

Going clear within two minutes, the Light Blues held an advantage of at least four lengths by the time they passed below Barnes Bridge. The victory secured, they paddled to the finish, winning by three and a half lengths in a time of 19 minutes 25 seconds. It was their fourth win in five years in the fastest winning time since the 1902 race, and took the overall record in the event to 34–28 in Oxford's favour.
