= John Brooks Close =

English banker and amateur rower

John Brooks Close-Brooks (9 June 1850 – 20 March 1914) was an English banker and amateur rower who won the Diamond Challenge Sculls at Henley Royal Regatta in 1870 and rowed for Cambridge in the Boat Race in 1871 and 1872.

== Career ==
Close-Brooks was born as "Close" at Naples, Italy, the son of James Close. His father was an adviser to Ferdinand II of Naples and lived at Antibes. He was educated at Trinity College, Cambridge, where he was a proficient rower. In 1870 he won the Diamond Challenge Sculls at Henley and also came second in the Silver Goblets with his brother James Brooks Close. John Brooks Close rowed in the winning Cambridge crew in the 1871 Boat Race and came second in the Silver Goblets with his brother again. In the 1872 Boat Race, he was in the winning Cambridge crew again, with his brother James in bow.

Close joined the banking firm established by his uncle John Cunliffes Brooks at Manchester and became a partner in 1888. He also became a director of the Lancashire and Yorkshire Railway. He assumed the additional surname of Brooks on 14 February 1889. He was a J.P. and was High Sheriff of Cheshire in 1911. Close-Brooks lived at Birtles Hall, Chelford, Cheshire, where he died at the age of 63.

Close's brothers James and William both rowed for Cambridge in the boat race. William Brooks Close established the firm of Close Brothers.

== See also ==
- List of Cambridge University Boat Race crews

Honorary titles
Preceded by Francis Aylmer Frost	High Sheriff of Cheshire; 1911	Succeeded by Joseph Battersby Duckworth
