= The Boat Race 1991 =

137th Boat Race
- Date: 30 March 1991
- Winner: Oxford
- Margin of victory: 4 1/4 lengths
- Winning time: 16 minutes 59 seconds
- Overall record (Cambridge–Oxford): 69–67

Other races
- Reserve winner: Goldie
- Women's winner: Oxford

The 137th Boat Race took place on 30 March 1991. Held annually, the Boat Race is a side-by-side rowing race between crews from the Universities of Oxford and Cambridge along the River Thames. Oxford, whose crew contained one of only two men to have rowed for both universities, won by 4 1/4 lengths.

In the reserve race, Cambridge's Goldie defeated Oxford's Isis, while Oxford won the Women's Boat Race.

== Background ==
The Boat Race is a side-by-side rowing competition between the University of Oxford (sometimes referred to as the "Dark Blues") and the University of Cambridge (sometimes referred to as the "Light Blues"). First held in 1829, the race takes place on the 4.2-mile (6.8 km) Championship Course on the River Thames in southwest London. The rivalry is a major point of honour between the two universities and followed throughout the United Kingdom and broadcast worldwide. Oxford went into the race as reigning champions, having won the 1990 race by 2 1/4 lengths, with Cambridge leading overall with 69 victories to Oxford's 66 (excluding the "dead heat" of 1877). The race was sponsored by Beefeater Gin.

The first Women's Boat Race took place in 1927, but did not become an annual fixture until the 1960s. Until 2014, the contest was conducted as part of the Henley Boat Races, but as of the 2015 race, it is held on the River Thames, on the same day as the men's main and reserve races. The reserve race, contested between Oxford's Isis boat and Cambridge's Goldie boat has been held since 1965. It usually takes place on the Tideway, prior to the main Boat Race.

== Crews ==
The Oxford crew weighed 9.5 pounds (4.3 kg) per rower more than their opponents. The Oxford crew's average age was 22, while Cambridge were, on average, half a year younger. Richard Young, Oxford's bow, had rowed for Cambridge in the 1990 race, making him one of only two men to earn a rowing Blue for both universities. Both crews contained former Blues; Cambridge saw Richard Staite, Guy Pooley and Adam Wright return, while Oxford welcomed the return of Young, Calman Maclennan, Matthew Pinsent and Rupert Obholzer.

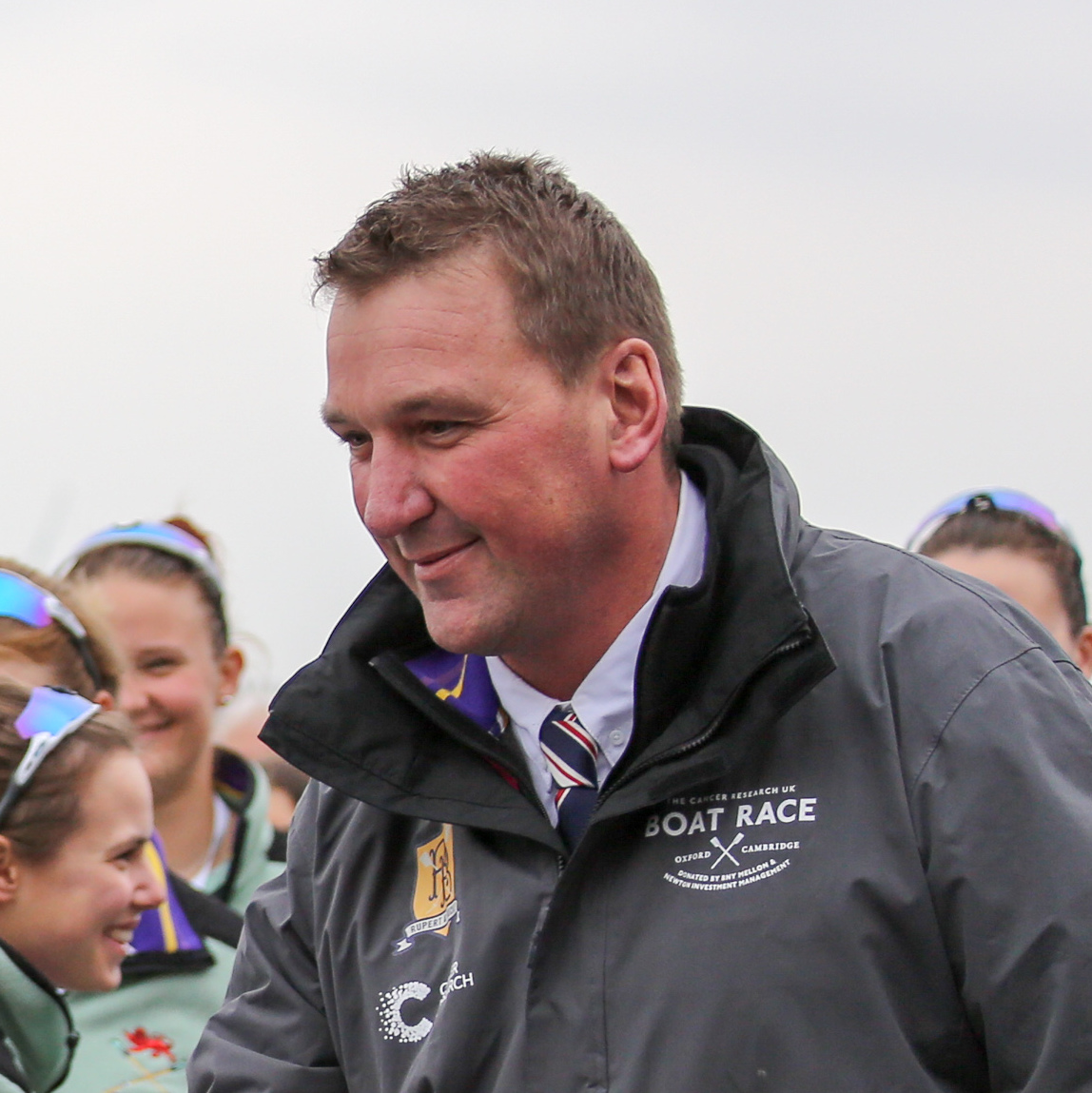
Matthew Pinsent (pictured in 2018) rowed at number 6 for Oxford.

Seat	Oxford			Cambridge		
Seat	Name	College	Weight	Name	College	Weight
Bow	Richard C Young	St John's	12 st 12 lb	Richard A B Smith	Trinity Hall	12 st 10 lb
2	Joseph G Michels	University	13 st 1 lb	Richard J Staite (P)	St Catharine's	11 st 4 lb
3	Peter AJ Bridge	Oriel	14 st 1 lb	Maximillian C J Justicz	Sidney Sussex	13 st 8 lb
4	Hamish P M Hume	Pembroke	13 st 7 lb	Guy R Pooley	St John's	13 st 3 lb
5	Calman A Maclennan	Keble	14 st 2 lb	Keiron St C Allen	Magdalene	13 st 2 lb
6	Matthew C Pinsent	St Catherine's	15 st 2 lb	David R Gillard	St Catharine's	14 st 6 lb
7	Robert W Martin	University	13 st 9 lb	Nicholas J Clarry	Jesus	12 st 11 lb
Stroke	Rupert J Obholzer (P)	St Catherine's	13 st 10 lb	Adam J Wright	Corpus Christi	13 st 6 lb
Cox	Neil Chugani	St Catherine's	7 st 13 lb	Andrew J L Bracey	Magdalene	7 st 12 lb
Source: (P) – boat club president

== Race ==
The Championship Course along which the Boat Race is contested

Oxford won the toss and elected to start from the Surrey station. Rating higher, Cambridge took an early lead under the guidance of experienced stroke Adam Wright, and were almost a length up after two-and-a-half minutes. By the Mile Post, the lead was just a second and the long bend around Harrods Furniture Depository, afforded Oxford the advantage, and by Hammersmith Bridge the Dark Blues were over two seconds ahead. Extending their lead to seven seconds by Chiswick Steps, Oxford took control of the race and passed under Barnes Bridge with a twelve-second advantage. Oxford passed the finishing post in a time of 16 minutes 59 seconds, the third-fastest time in the history of the Boat Race, winning their 18th race in 23 years. The Beefeater Gin Trophy was presented to the victorious Oxford Boat Club president Obholzer by the Princess Royal.

In the reserve race, Cambridge's Goldie won by four lengths over Isis, their fourth victory in five years. Oxford won the 46th Women's Boat Race by three lengths in a time of 7 minutes and 29 seconds, their second victory in four years.

== Reaction ==
Oxford's finishing coach was surprised that Cambridge made such a good start, while his counterpart, Stephen Peel, had hoped that his crew would "rattle Oxford by breaking contact". Winning head coach Stephen Royle praised his stroke, Obholzer: "Rupert was brilliant. He took the race by the scruff of the neck." Despite Michels shouting "see you at the finish" as his boat pulled away from Cambridge, and a celebration considered "street-gang-style prancing" by the Oxford crew, Michels explained: "without Cambridge, there is no race. The beauty of the event is the personal conflict, and that is what it brings out in the crowds."
