= Ronald Powell (rower) =

English rower

Darryl Yung
Personal information
- Nationality: English
- Born: 6 May 1884
- Died: 12 February 1930 (aged 46)

Sport
- Sport: Rower

Ronald Vanneck Powell (6 May 1884 – 12 February 1930) was an English rower who twice won Silver Goblets at Henley Royal Regatta.

Powell was born at Hornsey, the son of Rev. Robert Walter Powell, and his wife Mary Caroline Hankey. He was educated at Eton and at Trinity College, Cambridge, where he was a member of the Pitt Club. He rowed for Cambridge in the Boat Race in 1904, 1905 and 1906. Cambridge won in 1904, but lost in 1905. In the winning crew of 1906, he was No.6 and his younger brother Eric was No. 7 behind him. In 1906 he partnered Banner Johnstone to win the Silver Goblets at Henley Royal Regatta, beating the Belgians Molmanns and Visser in the final by 3 lengths. Powell and Johnstone won Silver Goblets again in 1907 this time beating Julius Beresford and Karl Vernon easily in the final.

During World War I, Powell was a lieutenant in the Scots Guards and was awarded the Military Cross in 1916. After the war, Powell emigrated to Australia and lived at Escrick, Undera, Victoria. He died there of pneumonia at the age of 45.

== See also ==
- List of Cambridge University Boat Race crews
