= Walter Prideaux (rower) =

English rower

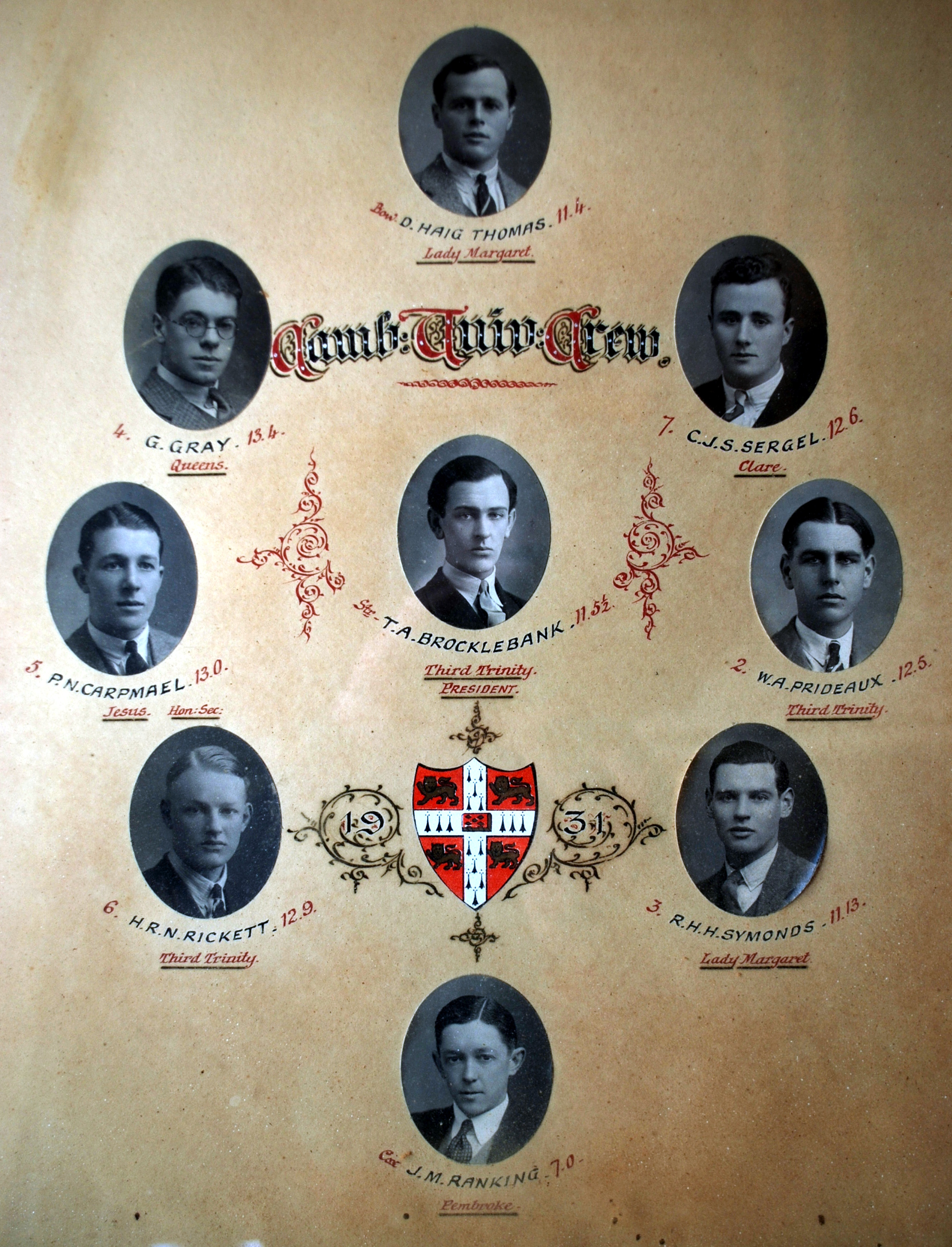
Walter Prideaux on a poster for Cambridge University BC crew 1931

Walter Arbuthnot Prideaux, CBE MC TD (4 January 1910 – 5 November 1995) was an English rower who won Silver Goblets at Henley Royal Regatta.

== Life ==
Prideaux was born to Walter Treverbian Prideaux and his wife Marion Fenn Arbuthnot in 1910. He was educated Eton College and Trinity College, Cambridge. In 1930 he was a member of the winning Cambridge boat in the Boat Race and won Silver Goblets at Henley Royal Regatta partnering Harold Rickett. He was in the winning Cambridge boat in the Boat Race again in 1931

Prideaux became a solicitor. In World War II he served with Kent Yeomanry and was awarded the T.D. and the M.C. He followed in a family tradition and was clerk of the Goldsmiths' Company from 1958.

Prideaux lived at Rusper, Horsham, West Sussex. He died at the age of 85.

Prideaux married Anne Cokayne, daughter of Francis Stewart Cokayne and Dorothy Emily Probyn, on 4 February 1937.

== See also ==
- List of Cambridge University Boat Race crews
