= Edward Williams (rower) =

British rower

Olympic medal record

Men's rowing
Bronze medal – third place	1908 London	Eight

Edward Gordon Williams (20 July 1888 – 12 August 1915) was a British rower who competed in the 1908 Summer Olympics. He was killed in action during the First World War.

Williams was born at Honiton, Devon, and educated at Eton and Trinity College, Cambridge, where he was a member of the Pitt Club. He rowed for Cambridge in the Boat Race in 1908. The Cambridge crew made up a boat in the eights which won the bronze medal for Great Britain rowing at the 1908 Summer Olympics. He rowed for Cambridge in the Boat Race in 1909 and also in 1909 partnered Banner Johnstone to win the Silver Goblets at Henley Royal Regatta against Julius Beresford and Karl Vernon. He raced in the 1910 Boat Race.

Williams was appointed as a colonial administrator in North-Western Rhodesia. He then served in the First World War as a lieutenant with the Grenadier Guards. He was killed in action at age 27 near Béthune and was buried at St. Venant Communal Cemetery nearby.

== See also ==
- List of Olympians killed in World War I
- List of Cambridge University Boat Race crews
