= Harold Rickett =

English rower

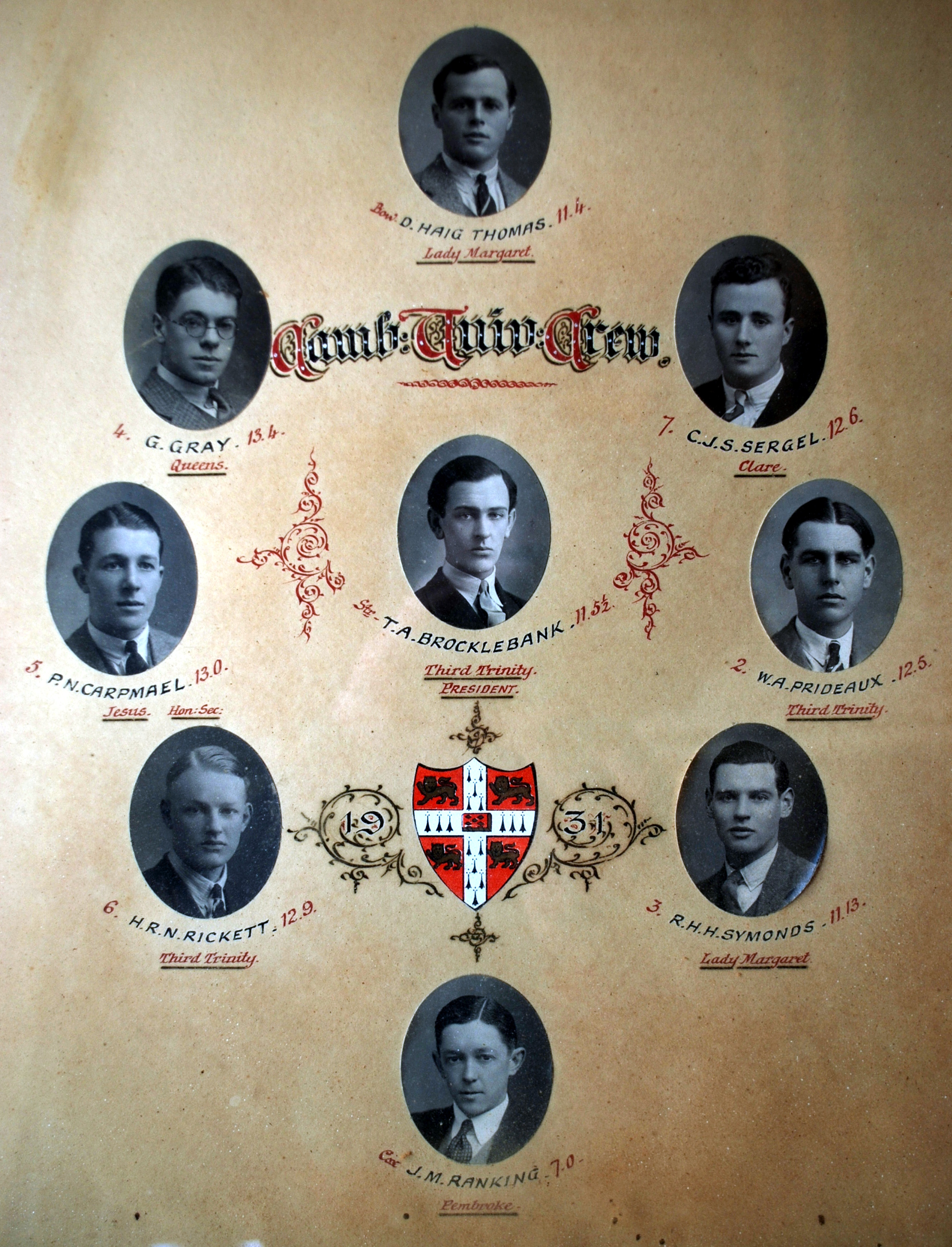
Cambridge University BC Crew 1931

Harold Robert Norman Rickett (20 July 1909 – 31 January 1969) was an English rower who competed at the 1932 Summer Olympics.

Rickett was born in Paddington, London. He was educated at Trinity College, Cambridge. In 1930 he was a member of the winning Cambridge boat in the Boat Race and won Silver Goblets at Henley Royal Regatta partnering Walter Prideaux. He was in the winning Cambridge boat in the Boat Race again in 1931 and in 1932 when he was president. The 1932 crew won the Grand Challenge Cup at Henley, rowing as Leander Club. They were subsequently chosen to represent Great Britain at the 1932 Summer Olympics in Los Angeles, where they came fourth in the eights.

During World War II, Rickett became a lieutenant-colonel in the Queen's Royal Regiment (West Surrey). He was awarded the Territorial Decoration and the CBE.

Rickett maintained a strong interest in the sport and umpired the Boat Race in 1946. He became chairman of Henley Royal Regatta, and president of Leander Club. With Dickie Burnell, Rickett authored A Short History of Leander Club 1818–1968.

Rickett married Dorothy Barry daughter of E. O. Barry of Lower Kingswood, Surrey.

== See also ==
- List of Cambridge University Boat Race crews
