= Noel Symonds =

English rower

Noel Parry Symonds (25 December 1863 – 31 December 1943) was an English rower who won the Silver Goblets at Henley Royal Regatta.

Symonds was born at Broomy Hill, Herefordshire. He was the fifth son of James Frederick Symonds, a solicitor, and his wife Mary Elizabeth Cleave. He was educated at Hereford Cathedral School under F. H. Tatham and St John's College, Cambridge. He rowed in the Cambridge boat in the Boat Race in 1885 and 1886 races. In 1888 he won the Silver Goblets at Henley Royal Regatta with Edward Buck.

Symonds was a master at Bedford School from 1886 to 1933, becoming Vice-Master in 1923. He married Mabel Alloway Askwith, daughter of the Rev. Henry Askwith, Prebendary of Hereford, in January 1906, and had a family.

Symonds died at the age of 80.

== See also ==
- List of Cambridge University Boat Race crews
