= Claude Goldie =

English rower

Claude John Dashwood Goldie (29 December 1876 – 30 December 1956) was an English rower who won the Silver Goblets at Henley Royal Regatta.

Goldie was born at St Ives, Huntingdonshire, the son of John Goldie and his wife Grace Miriam Watson. His father was a noted Cambridge University rower. Goldie was educated at Eton and at Trinity College, Cambridge, where he was a member of the Pitt Club. He rowed for Cambridge in the Boat Race in 1898 and 1899, and was President of Cambridge University Boat Club in 1899 and 1900. In 1900 he won the Silver Goblets at Henley Royal Regatta, partnering Graham Maitland. He won Silver Goblets again in 1904, this time partnering Claude Taylor.

Goldie served in World War I as a captain in the Royal Field Artillery and was awarded the Military Cross in 1917. He was in business as a woolbroker and made business trips to the United States.

Goldie later lived at Saint George's Hill, Weybridge and was president of Walton Rowing Club. He died at Weybridge at the age of 80.

Goldie married Bertha Mary Dupuis in Yorkshire in 1905.

== See also ==
- List of Cambridge University Boat Race crews
