= Bill Sambell =

Australian rower (1910–1974)

Personal information
- Nationality: Australian
- Born: William Austin Tyers Sambell; October 29, 1910 Melbourne, Victoria, Australia
- Died: March 27, 1974 (aged 63)
- Education: Melbourne Grammar School; Pembroke College, Cambridge

Sport
- Sport: Rowing
- Club: Leander Club

Achievements and titles
- Olympic finals: 1932 Summer Olympics

William Austin Tyers Sambell (29 October 1910 – 27 March 1974) was an Australian rower who competed for Great Britain at the 1932 Summer Olympics.

== Early life and education ==
Sambell was born in Melbourne, Victoria, Australia. He was educated at Melbourne Grammar School before going to England to study at Pembroke College, Cambridge.

== Career ==
In 1931 he and his partner Lewis Luxton were runners-up in Silver Goblets at Henley Royal Regatta to Jumbo Edwards and Lewis Clive.

In 1932 he was a member of the winning Cambridge boat in the Boat Race. The 1932 Cambridge crew won the Grand Challenge Cup at Henley, rowing as Leander Club. They were subsequently chosen to represent Great Britain at the 1932 Summer Olympics in Los Angeles, where they came fourth in the eights. He was in the winning Cambridge boat in the Boat Race again in 1933 and 1934.

== Personal life ==
In 1934 he announced his engagement to Elizabeth Carey of West Bristol.

== See also ==
- List of Cambridge University Boat Race crews
