= Harold Kitching =

British High Sheriff and rower

Olympic medal record

Men's rowing
Bronze medal – third place	1908 London	Eight

Harold Edward Kitching (31 August 1885 – 18 August 1980) was a British rower who competed in the 1908 Summer Olympics and served as High Sheriff of Durham.

Kitching was born at Great Ayton, Yorkshire, the son of Alfred Edward Kitching and his wife Annie Backhouse Richardson. He was educated at Cambridge University and rowed for Cambridge in the Boat Race in 1908. The Cambridge crew made up a boat in the eights which won the bronze medal for Great Britain rowing at the 1908 Summer Olympics. Kitching also rowed in the 1909 Boat Race.

Kitching served in the First World War, being made second lieutenant in the 5th Battalion, The Durham Light Infantry on 10 October 1914. He reached the rank of lieutenant colonel, and when he retired from the army he acquired Elmwood at Hartburn, Stockton-on-Tees where his former batman (Wilfred Young, father of Muriel who later found fame in television) became his chauffeur. He was awarded MBE and was appointed High Sheriff of Durham in 1941. He was active in agricultural affairs, being chairman of Stokesley Agricultural Society

== See also ==
- List of Cambridge University Boat Race crews

Honorary titles
Preceded by Sir Robert Chapman	High Sheriff of Durham; 1941–1942	Succeeded by Sir Thomas Bradford
