= Charles Sergel =

British rower and surgeon (1911–1980)

- Born: 12 May 1911; Rio de Janeiro, Brazil
- Died: 21 May 1980 (aged 69)
- Education: Monkton Combe School
- Alma mater: Clare College, Cambridge
- Occupations: Christian missionary Surgeon
- Known for: Olympic rower
- Title: Fellow of the Royal College of Surgeons
- Spouse: Elizabeth Stileman

Charles John Scott Sergel (12 May 1911 – 21 May 1980) was a surgeon, missionary doctor and a rower who competed at the 1932 Summer Olympics.

Sergel was born in Rio de Janeiro, Brazil, the oldest of three sons of missionaries. He and his younger brothers all attended Monkton Combe School, with Charles going on to Clare College, Cambridge in 1930. In 1931 and 1932 he was a member of the winning Cambridge boats in the University Boat Races. The 1932 Cambridge crew won the Grand Challenge Cup at Henley Royal Regatta rowing as Leander Club, and was subsequently chosen to represent Great Britain at the 1932 Summer Olympics in Los Angeles, where they came fourth. He again represented the winning Cambridge crew in the Boat Race in 1933 when he was president.

In 1937 Sergel qualified as a doctor at St Mary's Hospital and after working for a year in hospitals he went to Uganda in 1938 as a medical missionary. In the following year, after the outbreak of World War II he joined the medical corps in East Africa and served throughout the war becoming a major.

After the war Sergel returned as a surgeon to Mengo Hospital in Kampala and as a Christian missionary doctor in the villages. He left Africa in 1952 and returned to England, where he became a FRCS and went into general practice at Great Shelford, Cambridgeshire. He coached the crews at Clare College and took up sailing.

Sergel retired in 1976 to Milford-on-Sea where he kept his boat. When he decided to give up his boat, he took a farewell journey and in the course of it died of a heart attack.

Sergel married Elizabeth Joan Stileman in 1947 and had two daughters.

== Publications ==
- C J S SERGEL. Surgical emphysema of intestine after gastro-enterostomy. East African medical journal. 1951 Oct;28(10): 413-4

== See also ==
- List of Cambridge University Boat Race crews
