= Lewis Luxton =

Australian sports administrator (1910–1985)

Lewis Luxton CBE (12 September 1910 – 9 November 1985) was an Australian rower who competed for Great Britain at the 1932 Summer Olympics and became a member of the International Olympic Committee.

Luxton was born in Melbourne, Victoria, Australia, the son of Sir Harold Luxton who was a member of the IOC. He was educated at Melbourne Grammar School before going to England to study at Pembroke College, Cambridge. In 1931 he and his partner William Sambell were runners-up in Silver Goblets at Henley Royal Regatta to Jumbo Edwards and Lewis Clive. In 1932 he was a member of the winning Cambridge boat in the Boat Race. The 1932 Cambridge crew won the Grand Challenge Cup at Henley, rowing as Leander Club. They were subsequently chosen to represent Great Britain at the 1932 Summer Olympics in Los Angeles, where they came fourth in the eights.

Luxton served with his father on the AOF Executive Committee for many years. When his father, resigned from the IOC on 9 May 1951 Otto Mayer immediately announced Lewis would be his successor. Luxton, as deputy chairman, undertook a great deal of work for the 1956 Summer Olympics in Melbourne. In 1957 he was awarded CBE for services to the Olympic movement.

Luxton was Chairman of Shell Australia where he was able to give support to Herb Elliott and Ralph Doubell, both of whom were employees. At Mexico in the 1968 Summer Olympics, he made the presentation to Doubell of the gold medal for the 800m.

Luxton was made an honorary member of the IOC when he retired in 1974. Luxton had the deciding vote on whether Australia should send athletes to compete at the 1980 Summer Olympics in Moscow. In a 6–5 vote, Australia attended the Games officially.

== See also ==
- List of Cambridge University Boat Race crews
