= David Jennens =

English rower and doctor (1929–2000)

Personal information
- Born: 8 April 1929 Solihull, United Kingdom
- Died: 27 September 2000 (aged 71) Cambridge, United Kingdom
- Education: Oundle School; Clare College, Cambridge
- Occupation: Medical doctor
- Weight: 12 st 7 lb (79.4 kg) (in 1951)
Medal record
Men's rowing
Representing Great Britain
European Rowing Championships
Gold medal – first place	1951 Mâcon	Eight

David Michael Jennens (8 April 1929 – 27 September 2000) was an English rower who competed for Great Britain in the 1952 Summer Olympics; he was also a medical doctor.

Jennens was born in Solihull, United Kingdom. He attended Oundle School and in 1947 went up to Clare College, Cambridge. He stroked the Clare coxless four that won the Cambridge University event twice, and in 1949 won the Visitors' Challenge Cup at Henley Royal Regatta.

In eights racing, Jennens stroked the Clare crew that rowed Head of the River in the 1949 May Bumps. He earned his Blue when he stroked Cambridge to a win by a quarter of a length against Oxford in the 1949 Boat Race. He rowed in the number two seat of the 1950 winning Cambridge crew, and then returned to the stroke seat for the Cambridge victory of 1951. The umpire had ordered a re-row of the 1951 race after Oxford sank in treacherous conditions.

Also in 1951, Jennens was the stroke of the British eight that won the European Rowing Championships in Mâcon, France. In 1952, he stroked the Leander Club eight that won the Grand Challenge Cup at Henley. This crew went on to row as Great Britain in the 1952 Summer Olympics in Helsinki, finishing fourth.

Jennens qualified as a doctor at St Thomas' Hospital in London. He worked for a while in Canada, before returning to general practice in Cambridge. He was a Steward of Henley Royal Regatta, and he coached many rowing crews from Cambridge University, Clare Boat Club, and Cambridge town clubs.

== See also ==
- List of Cambridge University Boat Race crews
- Rowing at the Summer Olympics
