= Graham Maitland =

British rower

Graham Macdowall Maitland (20 May 1879 – 1 November 1914) was an English rower who won the Silver Goblets at Henley Royal Regatta.

Maitland was born at Kirkcudbright, the third son of David Maitland of Cumstoun, Kirkcudbright. He was educated at Marlborough College and Trinity College, Cambridge, where he was a member of the Pitt Club. In 1900 Maitland won the Silver Goblets at Henley Royal Regatta with Claude Goldie. He rowed for Cambridge in the Boat Race in 1901.

Maitland was called to the Bar at Inner Temple in July 1905. He spent some time surveying in British Columbia. In the First World War, he was a 2nd lieutenant in the Irish Guards and was mentioned in despatches. He was killed in action at Klein Zillebeke, Flanders.

== See also ==
- List of Cambridge University Boat Race crews
