= Claude Taylor (rower) =

English rower

Claude Waterhouse Hearn Taylor CBE, DSO (born 19 October 1880) was an English rower who twice won the Silver Goblets at Henley Royal Regatta.

Taylor was born in London, the son of John Henry Taylor. He was educated at Eton and Trinity College, Cambridge. At Cambridge he was librarian of the Pitt Club. He rowed for Cambridge in the Boat Race in 1901, 1902 and 1903. He was president of Cambridge University Boat Club (CUBC) in 1902 and Cambridge won the race in 1902 and 1903. In 1902 Taylor won the Silver Goblets at Henley Royal Regatta with William Dudley Ward. He won Silver Goblets again in 1904, this time partnering Claude Goldie.

Taylor served in the First World War in the 3rd Battalion, Queen's Own Royal West Kent Regiment. He was a captain and brevet major in the Special Reserve of Officers. Taylor was Mentioned in Despatches four times and awarded the Distinguished Service Order in 1919. He was awarded the Order of the Redeemer, 4th Class and the Medal of Military Merit, 3rd Class by the Kingdom of Greece. He was also awarded the Order of the White Eagle with Swords, 4th Class by the Kingdom of Serbia. He was made CBE in 1919, and relinquished his commission on 1 April 1920.

Taylor was subsequently General Manager of the Carthagena Railway in Panama.

Taylor married Margaret Edyth Syra Jameson of Sunninghill, Berkshire.

== See also ==
- List of Cambridge University Boat Race crews
