= John Dale (cricketer, born 1848) =

English rower and cricketer

Personal information
- Full name: John William Dale
- Born: 21 June 1848; Lincoln, England
- Died: 26 June 1895 (aged 47); Westminster, England
- Batting: Right-handed
- Bowling: Right-arm fast

Domestic team information
- Years: Team
- 1868–1870: Cambridge University
- 1869–1882: MCC
- 1874–1878: Middlesex
- FC debut: 14 May 1868 Cambridge Univ. v MCC
- Last FC: 31 August 1882 MCC v Yorkshire

Career statistics
Competition	First-class
Matches	56
Runs scored	1,625
Batting average	16.92
100s/50s	1/5
Top score	132
Balls bowled	312
Wickets	6
Bowling average	29.00
5 wickets in innings	0
10 wickets in match	0
Best bowling	2/16
Catches/stumpings	39/–
- Source: CricketArchive, 20 February 2011

John William Dale (21 June 1848 – 26 June 1895) was an English rower and cricketer who played for Cambridge University from 1868 to 1870, for Marylebone Cricket Club (MCC) from 1869 to 1882 and for Middlesex from 1874 to 1878.

Dale was born at Lincoln, the son of Thurston Dale, a solicitor. He was educated at Tonbridge School and was in the Tonbridge School cricket team from 1863 to 1866. He was admitted at St John's College, Cambridge on 12 July 1866. He played cricket for Lincolnshire in 1867 and 1868. At Cambridge he played cricket for Cambridge University and was in the winning side in the Varsity match in 1868. In 1869, he rowed in the Cambridge eight stroked by J H D Goldie in the Boat Race. He also played for Cambridge again in a win in the Varsity cricket match. He rowed for Cambridge with Goldie again in the 1870 Boat Race when Cambridge won. In the Varsity cricket match in 1870 he scored 15 and 67 and his partnership with William Yardley in the second innings turned the game and Frank Cobden's hat-trick on the last three balls won the match for Cambridge by two runs. Over the years Dale played many matches for MCC, and Gentlemen's and North of England teams. In 1870 he also played for the Gentlemen against the Players at Lords and at the Oval when he scored 55 in a 164 run partnership with W. G. Grace. Dale was awarded BA in 1870.

In 1872, Dale joined the firm of Edmund James Smith, Land Agent to the Ecclesiastical Commissioners for England, in the North of England. He made a century playing for MCC against Cambridge University in 1872. In 1874 he made his debut playing for Middlesex and played seven county matches by 1878. He also played many games for various clubs over these years.

Dale was a right-handed batsman who played 98 innings in 56 first-class matches with an average of 16.92 and a top score of 132. His style of batting was described as "extremely finished and elegant". He was a right-arm round arm fast bowler and took 6 first-class wickets at an average of 29.00 and a best performance of 2 for 16.

Dale became a salaried partner in his firm in 1879. He enjoyed country sports and hunted with most of the best packs and was a first-rate fisherman.

Dale died at 1 Upper George Street, Westminster aged 47 from an attack of pneumonia following influenza.

== See also ==
- List of Cambridge University Boat Race crews
