= Henry Hoffstot =

American rower (born 1990)

Personal information
- Nationality: American
- Height: 195 cm (6 ft 5 in)
- Weight: 92.2 kg (203 lb)

Sport
- Country: United States
- Sport: Rowing
- College team: Hughes Hall Boat Club; Georgetown University
- Club: Cambridge University Boat Club

Henry Fife Hoffstot (born September 23, 1990) is an American rower. He competed for Cambridge University Boat Club in The Boat Race in 2014, 2015, and 2016, serving as the winning President in 2016.

Hoffstot competed at the 2014 World Rowing Championships representing the USA, and was elected Hawks' Club Cambridge University athlete of the year in 2016.

Hoffstot is the current owner of Faro Café, a coffee shop located in the Harvard square area of Cambridge, Massachusetts.
