= David Gillard =

British rower (born 1971)

Personal information
- Born: 23 June 1971 (age 55)
- Education: Bedford Modern School; St Catharine's College, Cambridge

Sport
- Sport: Rowing

David Gillard (born 23 June 1971), rowed for Great Britain and represented Cambridge at the 1991, 1992 and 1993 Boat Races.

== Life ==
Gillard was born 23 June 1971 and educated at Bedford Modern School and St Catharine's College, Cambridge. At Bedford Modern, Gillard was in the last crew to win the Special Race for Schools at Henley Royal Regatta in 1989 before the event was discontinued.

Gillard rowed for the Great Britain Junior team in the Eight at the Szeged Reservoir, Hungary in 1989 winning a bronze medal. Gillard then rowed for Great Britain in the Nations Cup (precursor to the U23 World Rowing Championships) in Linz Ottensheim, Austria (1990, Eight, bronze); Naro Lago, San Giovanni, Italy (1991, coxless four, silver); and Glasgow (1992, coxless four, gold). Representing Goldie Boat Club, Gillard was a member of the winning crews of the Britania Challenge Cup (setting a new course record) and Silver Goblets & Nickalls’ Challenge Cup at Henley Royal Regatta in 1992. Rowing for Imperial College Boat Club, Gillard won the Grand Challenge Cup in 1996, and the Visitors' Challenge Cup in 2002 at the Henley Royal Regatta.

Gillard chaired the Cambridge selection process for the 2005 Boat Race.
