= Henry Goldsmith =

British rower

Olympic medal record

Men's rowing
Bronze medal – third place	1908 London	Eight

Henry Mills Goldsmith (22 July 1885 – 9 May 1915) was a British rower who competed in the 1908 Summer Olympics. He was killed in action during the First World War.

Goldsmith was born at Plympton, Devon, and was educated at Jesus College, Cambridge. He rowed for Cambridge in the Boat Race in 1906 and 1907. Although he did not row in the Boat Race in 1908, he was a member of the Cambridge crew, which made up a boat in the eights and won the bronze medal for Great Britain rowing at the 1908 Summer Olympics.

Goldsmith served in the First World War as a lieutenant with the Devonshire Regiment He was killed in action, aged 29, at Fromelles during the Second Battle of Ypres. His remains were not recovered and his name is inscribed on the Ploegsteert Memorial nearby.

== See also ==
- List of Olympians killed in World War I
- List of Cambridge University Boat Race crews
