= William Brooks Close =

British rower and businessman (1853–1923)

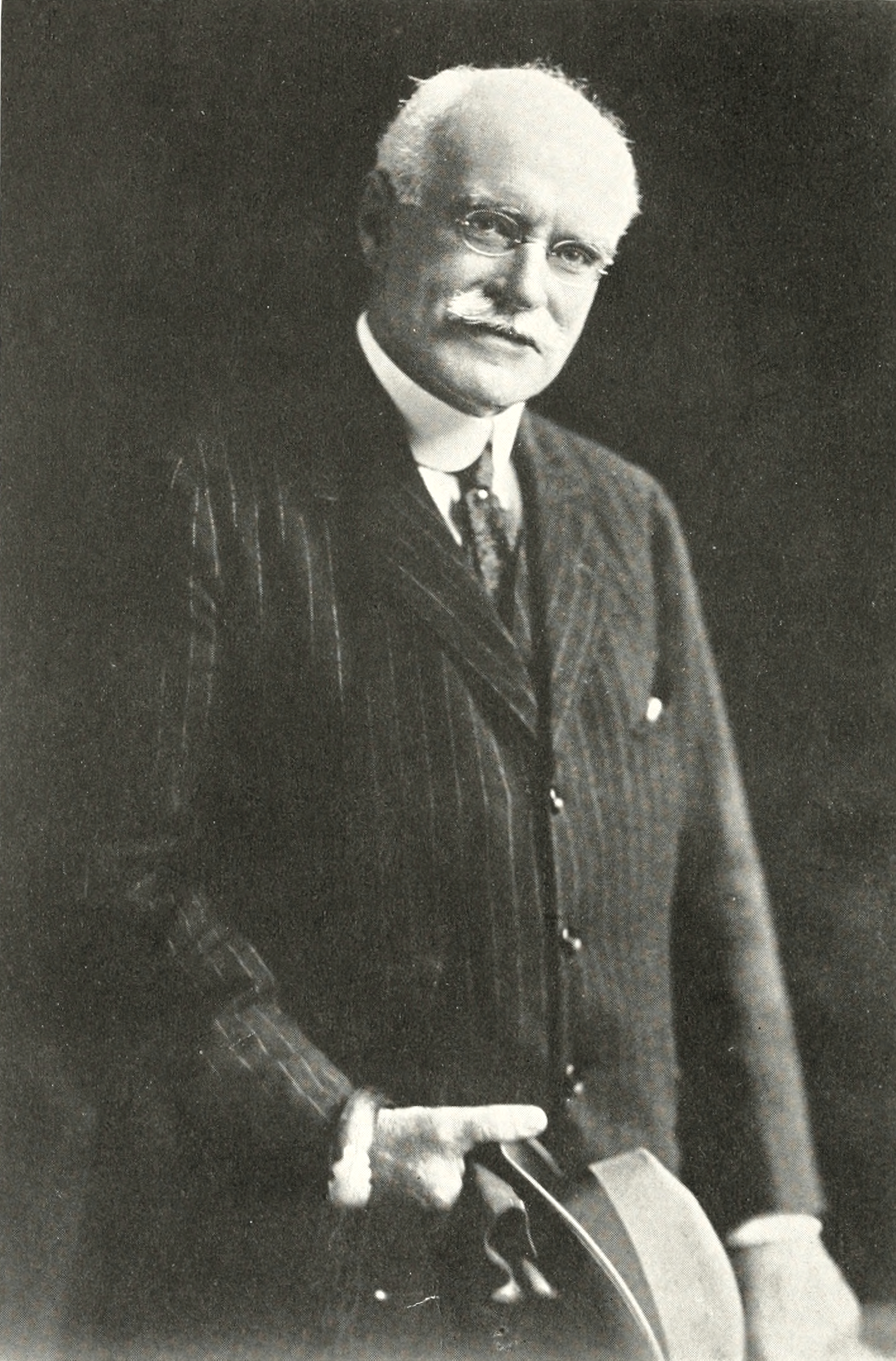
- Born: 1853; Naples, Italy
- Died: 1923 (aged 69–70); Isle of Wight, England
- Occupation: Businessman

William Brooks Close (1853–1923) was a British businessman active in the Midwestern United States. He first arrived in the United States during the summer of 1876 to compete in a regatta in Philadelphia while he was the president of the Cambridge University Boat Club. Close and two brothers, Frederick and James, created a colony in Iowa called the Close Colony. They made a profit from buying public land and reselling it. He was the co-founder of the Close Brothers Group. Close helped finance the building of a railway from Skagway into the Yukon, named the White Pass and Yukon Route.

== Early life ==
Close was born in 1853 in Naples, Italy. He was one of eight children, all of whom grew up on the yacht Sibilla, which his British father, James Close, sailed on the Mediterranean and Adriatic Seas. Close lived on the yacht until he was five years old. His father was a banker and a business advisor to Ferdinand II of the Two Sicilies. James taught his children based on his own ideals. Following Ferdinand II's death in 1859, James retired and subsequently died of a heart attack in 1865 at the family home in Antibes, France. After his father's death, his French mother Anne Brooks sent Close and his three brothers to school in Marlborough, Wiltshire. From the time he was a child, Close grew up with the idea that a man can be a gentleman and earn money. Close later attended Wellington College and Trinity College, Cambridge. He rowed in The Boat Race during his time at Cambridge. He was runner-up to Alfred Dicker in the Diamond Challenge Sculls at Henley Royal Regatta in 1875.

== First arrival in the United States ==
Close first arrived in the United States in 1876 when he was the president of the Cambridge University Boat Club that was taking part in the Centennial Regatta in Philadelphia during the summer. Recovering from an injury sustained during the race, Close met Daniel Paullin, a landowner and land speculator from Quincy, Illinois, who told him that it was possible to earn a significant amount of money buying and selling land in northwest Iowa to settlers. Close traveled to West Virginia where his brother Frederick had been farming for two years. The journey to West Virginia was Close's first exploration of the United States countryside and he attempted to learn what he could about the land. After touring Washington, D.C. and Philadelphia with his brother for leisure, they then proceeded to St. Louis, Missouri, to travel by steamboat in order to visit Paullin's family in Quincy, Illinois. He and his brother toured the prairies in the northwest of Iowa and could see the merit in Paullin's claim. Close wrote in his journal, "To see what sort of land we should buy and to have some idea of their value, we organized our party for a week or ten days cruise on wheels through the western and less settled parts of Iowa." The Close brother's first stop was in Des Moines, Iowa, to speak with land agents about tracts that were available for purchase. Close said of Des Moines, "Like all western American towns, there is nothing worth looking at." The party then traveled almost 250 miles (400 km) in a circle until they reached Stuart, Iowa. After the brothers had traveled throughout the Iowa prairies they returned to Quincy where they stayed briefly with Paullin and his family, including his daughter Mary.

== Emigration to the United States ==
During the spring of 1877, after their travels the year before, Close emigrated to the United States to be with his brother Frederick. Close meant to contact friends that he met when he first visited the United States, but did not contact them after receiving an invitation to stay in Boston from Daniel Paullin's son Ed. When the brothers arrived in Boston, they found that Daniel Paullin and Mary had not arrived yet, so Ed invited them to stay at Harvard University, where he was studying, in nearby Cambridge, Massachusetts. Upon the arrival of the two Paullin family members in Boston, the Close brothers traveled with them by train so they could visit Iowa's prairies in order to consider which land to buy. Their first purchase was for almost 2,594 acres (1,050 ha) in Denison, Iowa, for $3.25 per acre in 1877. The brothers raised cattle and hogs on their unused land. During this time, Close was a superintendent of a Sunday school and his brother sang in a choir. Their brother James later emigrated to Iowa and settled there.

Because farming in Iowa could yield a 54 per cent return on investment, in 1877, British squires were interested in sending their sons to live on suitable land. In 1878, Close and his brothers Frederick and James founded the Close Brothers Group in London after buying 14,475 acres (5,858 ha) acres of land. The company gave men from English universities the opportunity to become farmers in Iowa and it also started an agricultural college that taught relevant farming methods for that area. Close and his brother traveled between the United States and the United Kingdom often to make business deals for their Iowa land. In 1879, they opened their only other office, located in Sioux City, Iowa. Close became close to Mary Paullin, and they married in 1880. They moved their American office to Chicago in 1884.

== Close Colony ==
Close and his two brothers began a colony in Iowa, known as the Close Colony. Its heyday was from 1879 to 1885. The Close Colony was founded by Le Mars, Iowa in February 1879. The Close Colony was a community of British farmers.

Journalist Poultney Bigelow wrote in Harper's Magazine and described the colony,

They have the very best ground for fox hunting in the world – a rolling prairie with a creek here and there. Every colonist makes it his chief care, after buying his farm, to breed a good hunter for the steeplechase. They have regular meets for fox or 'paper' hunts, as the case may be. They last year opened a racing track, and wound up the race with a grand ball.

A newspaper journalist in Le Mars, Iowa, wrote, "They descend from the recesses of the Pullman palace cars dressed in the latest London and Paris styles, with Oxford hats, bright linen shining on their bosoms, a gold repeater tucking in the depths of their fashionably cut vest pockets. We recall last summer a single family that had eighty-two pieces of luggage." During the Close Colony's heyday, many prominent families from Great Britain had a relative living in the colony.

In 1880, Close wrote Farming in North-western Iowa, United States of America: A Pamphlet for Emigrants and a Guide to North-western Iowa. The pamphlet contained information about the Close brothers and for those emigrating to Iowa. The Close brothers purchased Kingsley, Iowa, then known as Quorn, in 1880 along with parts of six Iowa counties: Woodbury, Plymouth, Cherokee, Lyon, Sioux, and Osceola. Englishmen founded the Prairie Club in Le Mars in 1881, which became a popular venue for gatherings and was renovated in 1882. The only club members were British emigrants until 1882, when Americans were allowed to join to replace its dwindling numbers. In 1884, Congress introduced a bill to "stop the Leviathan squatters from buying more of America". At that time, tracts that were equal to almost one-quarter of the area of the British Isles were owned by British emigrants living in the United States.

The Close brothers took over the Iowa Land Company in 1881 after discussing the matter with Daniel Paullin, which was likely the biggest foreign company operating in the United States at the time. The Iowa Land Company was founded on May 28, 1855. They operated the Iowa Land Company to purchase acres of United States land, help investors manage farms, lease farms, offer mortgages, and look after stock feeding operations. The Close brothers were in the business of buying and selling acreage in Iowa, Minnesota, Kansas, Texas, and other states. At times they owned at almost 40,000 acres (16,000 ha) of the best land in the United States. The Iowa Land Company operated under the Close brothers from 1881 to 1884, when C. W. Benson began running the company.

There were multiple benefits for the Close Colony settlers. The Close brothers showed settlers "the best and cheapest lands" for a farm. If a settler was inexperienced at farming, they could live at a farm requiring help and possibly receive a wage. The Close brothers obtained wholesale lumber and were able to buy necessities such as machinery and furniture at a wholesale price. They charged a $250 commission and a $125 deposit before the settler left England. The deposit would be returned if the settler was unhappy living in the United States.

The Close Colony had little to keep it together, with the exception being the British class system's social code, which the settlers wished to bring with them to the colony. Some British immigrants were unconvinced that they had found their new home. They were under the impression that they could easily try something else if farming the land did not suit them. A few of them adopted a normal American middle-class life, but most of them did not want to do so. While living in Sibley, Iowa, with his wife Margaret, Frederick wrote to his brother in London about part of the Antibes property being sold. Close was working in the London location of Close Brothers Group at the time. The colony eventually disappeared after Frederick Close died in 1890 following a polo accident in Sioux City. An economic depression gripped the country, land lost its value, and a fire destroyed the Prairie Club. Most of the British immigrants returned to their original homes.

== Later life and death ==
Three months after Frederick Close died in 1890, William's wife Mary gave birth to a son named Herbert. Mary became suspicious of Close due to him leaving often without telling her where he was going and what he was doing. Close later admitted to Mary that he was with another woman. In 1893, Mary divorced him on the legal grounds of adultery. The court hearing took place on 18 July 1893 in the New York Supreme Court. After the hearing, the divorce was final and Mary gained full custody of the child.

In November 1897, Close met entrepreneur Charles Wilkinson who had maps, pictures, and stories about Alaska and the Yukon. Wilkinson thought there was a need to build a railroad to develop Alaska and Canada and wanted Close to invest in it. Wilkinson was willing to accept practically any deal, so Close decided to accept his proposal. Despite having an interest in building the railroad, Close did not intend for the Close Brothers Group to pay for all of its costs. The Close Brothers Group gave Wilkinson a $20,000 short-term loan. In February 1898, Wilkinson said his company was ready to begin building the railroad. Close assumed that Wilkinson could not pay back the loan on time, so he negotiated with others, including associates he knew about taking control. Wilkinson attempted to raise more money in Canada, but accepted the inevitable and gave Close control of the construction. On 8 March 1898, Close and his team researched legal issues that could prevent the completion of the railroad, known as the White Pass and Yukon Route. This enterprise was started in 1898 and it became operational by 1899.

After the enterprise became operational, Close moved to a manor near Henley-on-Thames in order to be closer to the rowing competitions in that area. In 1922, Close bought the Shipley Collieries in Derbyshire to process coal. Towards the end of his life, Close continued these business ventures and also hired others to use metal in order to reinforce concrete and roads. Close died in 1923 at the home of actress Florence Desmond on the Isle of Wight.

== See also ==
- List of Cambridge University Boat Race crews

== Book ==
- Harnack, Curtis (1985). Gentlemen on the Prairie. Iowa State University Press. ISBN 0-8138-0791-3.
