= Guy Pooley =

English rower

Guy Richard Pooley (born 2 October 1965) is an English rower who has competed for Great Britain in the Olympic Games, raced four times in the University Boat race and won major sculling events at Henley Royal Regatta and Head races.

== Career ==
Pooley rowed for Cambridge against Oxford in The Boat Race for four years (1988 to 1991).

A successful sculler, he won the Scullers Head in 1992 and 2001, and the Wingfield Sculls in 1991 and 1992.

He was a member of the Great Britain under 23 team in 1986 and 1987 and competed in the World Student Games in 1987 and 1989. He competed in the world rowing championships in 1991 and 1993.

He was on the GB rowing team for the 1992 Olympic Games in Barcelona, competing in the men's quadruple scull. In 1996 he went to Atlanta as the spare man, but competed in the double scull in the heat and the repechage replacing an ill James Cracknell.

He is a member of Crabtree and Leander Club.

Pooley is a chemistry teacher at Eton College. He lives in Eton, Berkshire, and comes from Soulbury, Bedfordshire, near Leighton Buzzard.

=== Henley Royal Regatta ===
- 1985 – Visitors' Challenge Cup
- 1987 – Visitors' Challenge Cup
- 1993 – Queen Mother Challenge Cup

=== Wingfield Sculls ===
- 1991
- 1992

== See also ==
- List of Cambridge University Boat Race crews
