= Richard Boyle (rowing) =

British rowing cox

Olympic medal record

Men's rowing
Bronze medal – third place	1908 London	Eight

Richard Frederick Robert Pochin Boyle (11 October 1888 – 6 February 1953) was a British coxswain who competed in the 1908 Summer Olympics.

Boyle was educated at Cambridge University and coxed the Cambridge boat in the Boat Race in 1907 and 1908. The Cambridge crew made up a boat in the eights which won the bronze medal rowing at the 1908 Summer Olympics.

In the First World War, Boyle was commissioned as a second lieutenant in the Oxfordshire and Buckinghamshire Light Infantry on 14 September 1914. He was promoted to temporary lieutenant on 9 December 1914, temporary captain on 23 July 1915, substantive lieutenant on 14 July 1916 and substantive captain on 24 June 1917. He was wounded and relinquished his commission on 8 May 1919 due to ill health.

Boyle married Marion Elisa Hill Wallace, daughter of Major-General Hill Wallace, on 12 February 1918.

== See also ==
- List of Cambridge University Boat Race crews
