= Ian Middleton (rowing) =

British cox (born 1995)

Personal information
- Nationality: British (English)
- Born: 27 June 1995 (age 30)
- Height: 173 cm (5 ft 8 in)
- Weight: 54 kg (119 lb)

Sport
- Country: Great Britain
- Sport: Rowing
- College team: Queens' College Boat Club
- Club: Cambridge University Boat Club
Medal record
Men's rowing
Representing Great Britain
World U23 Championships
| Silver medal – second place | 2016 Rotterdam | Eight |

Ian Peter Middleton (born 27 June 1995) is a former rowing cox from England.

== Profile ==
Whilst in education at Abingdon School he gained colours for the Abingdon School Boat Club. After leaving Abingdon in 2013 he attended Queens' College, Cambridge and joined the Queens' College Boat Club.

== Rowing ==
In 2014 he was selected as the cox for the Cambridge light blue boat at the world renowned Boat Race but finished on the losing side. A second appearance as cox in 2015 ensued but Cambridge once again lost. A third appearance arrived in 2016, which resulted in a win. In addition to representing Cambridge he has coxed Great Britain's under-23 men's eight crew, steering them to sixth place at the 2014 World Rowing U23 Championships in Varese, Italy and a silver medal at the 2016 World Rowing U23 Championships.

== See also ==
- List of Old Abingdonians
