= Close Brothers Group =

UK merchant banking group

Close Brothers Group plc
- Type: Public
- Traded as: LSE: CBG; FTSE 250 component
- Industry: Financial services
- Founded: 1878; 148 years ago
- Founder: William Brooks Close
- Headquarters: London, EC2; United Kingdom
- Key people: Mike Biggs (chairman); Mike Morgan (CEO)
- Products: Merchant banking; Securities; Wealth management
- Revenue: ▼£651.0 million (2026)
- Operating income: ▲£(60.3) million (2026)
- Net income: ▲£(63.4) million (2026)
- Number of employees: 3,000 (2026)
- Website: www.closebrothers.com

Close Brothers Group plc is a UK merchant banking group which provides lending, takes deposits, manages wealth and trades in securities. It is listed on the London Stock Exchange and is a constituent of the FTSE 250 Index.

== History ==
Close Brothers was founded in 1878 by William Brooks Close and his brothers Fred and James Close, who started offering farm mortgages in Sioux City, Iowa. In 1897, William Brooks Close paid £10,000 to the US government for the right to build Alaska's first railway the White Pass and Yukon Route.

The company was the subject of a management buy-out in 1978 and was first listed on the London Stock Exchange in 1984. In the 1980s and 1990s, the company expanded through the acquisition of a specialist businesses including Winterflood Securities in 1993, Hill Samuel's Corporate Finance Division in 1996 and Rea Brothers (established 1919) in 1999.

In March 2008, Close Brothers acquired UK short-term and bridging lender Commercial Acceptances Group for around £31m.

In December 2008, it was confirmed that Close Brothers Private Equity would be spun off as CBPE, and, in May 2009, it was announced that the corporate finance business was to be acquired by Daiwa Securities SMBC, a Japanese investment banking venture, leaving Close Brothers focused on capital markets, securities trading, lending and investment management. The corporate finance business would be renamed to DC Advisory.

Close Brothers disposed of Close Brothers Seydler Bank AG, its securities business in Germany, to Oddo & Cie in 2014, and sold Close Brothers Retail Finance to Klarna, the Swedish online financial service provider, in September 2018.

In July 2021, Close Brothers acquired PMN Financial Management for an undisclosed amount. The Surrey-based independent financial advice firm brought £300 million of assets with it.

In September 2023, Close Brothers acquired Bluestone Motor Finance, an Irish provider of motor finance. In December 2023, Close Brothers agreed to acquire Bottriell Adams, an independent financial advisor (IFA) based in Dorset, England, for £220 million.

In July 2025, the company announced the sale of Winterflood Securities for £104 million to Marex.

== Operations ==
Close Brothers Banking division lends to small and medium-sized businesses and individuals and offers deposit taking.

Winterflood, a market maker in the UK, trades in relevant MTFs and major dark pools and covers nearly all LSE listed stocks, as well as Alternative Investment Market (AIM) and ICAP Securities and Derivatives Exchange.

The company's chief executive is Mike Morgan, who has been in the role since January 2025 after superseding Adrian Sainsbury who stepped down from the role following a period of extended medical leave. Its board has been chaired by Mike Biggs since May 2017.

In 2024, a court ruled against Close Brothers and FirstRand Bank for mis-selling loans to car buyers. They had been paying commission to car dealers for recommending their loans, without the dealers revealing the commissions to the car buyers. In 2025, Close Brothers cancelled its dividend and planned to raise £400 million to cover the compensation that would be due to borrowers and the costs of the court case.

In 2025, Close Brothers announced that they had put up around £300 million for redress payments relating to the Financial Conduct Authority's motor finance scheme.
