= Eric Powell (rower) =

British rower and artist

Medal record

Men's rowing

Representing Great Britain

Olympic Games
Bronze medal – third place	1908 London	Eight

Eric Walter Powell (6 May 1886 – 17 August 1933) was an English schoolmaster, artist and rower who competed for Great Britain in the 1908 Summer Olympics.

Powell was born at Hornsey, the son of the Rev. Robert Walter Powell, the first vicar of Holy Innocents Church, and his wife Mary Caroline Hankey. He was educated at Eton and Trinity College, Cambridge, where he was a member of the Pitt Club. He rowed for Cambridge in the Boat Race in 1906, 1907 and 1908. In the winning crew of 1906, he was No.7, and his elder brother Ronald was No. 6 in front of him. The 1908 Cambridge crew made up a boat in the eights which won the bronze medal for Great Britain rowing at the 1908 Summer Olympics. He won the Diamond Challenge Sculls at Henley Royal Regatta in 1912 rowing for Viking Club.

During World War I, Powell served as Squadron Commander in the Royal Flying Corps and later the R.A.F.

Powell was a housemaster and art teacher at Eton and was himself a painter of watercolours. He was also a mountaineer and met his death at Pontresina in an Alpine accident on Piz Roseg. Cyril Alington, headmaster of Eton wrote.

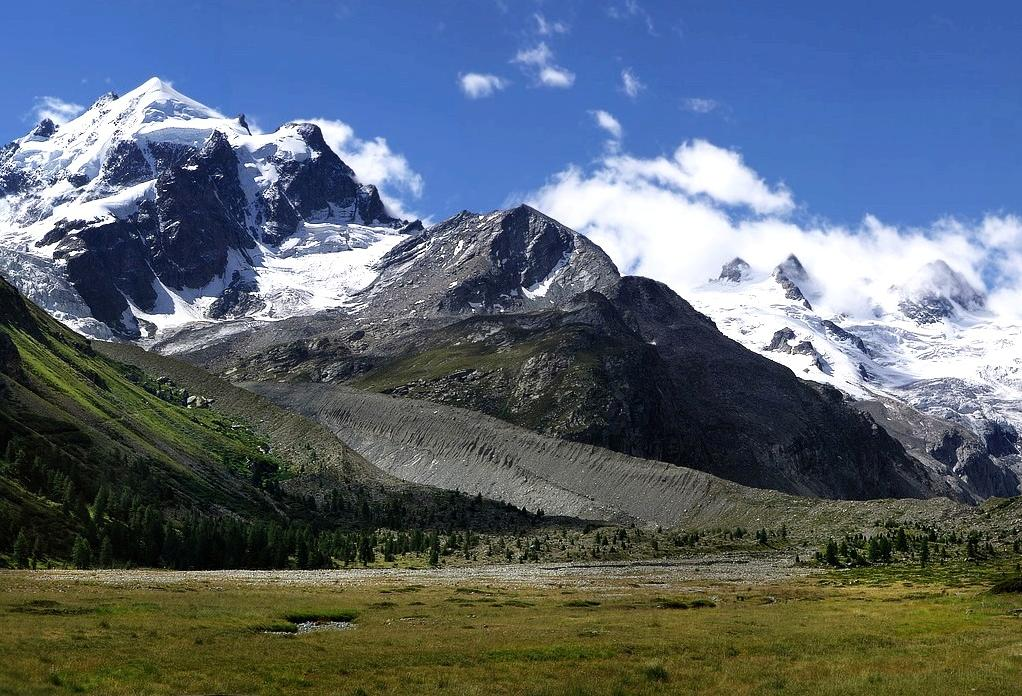
Piz Roseg above the Val Roseg

Eric Powell was a man of genius, which showed itself in many fields. The world perhaps knew him best as an oarsman, the winner of the Diamond Sculls, but there are others who think of his distinction in the Flying Corps and yet more to whom his wonderful talent as an artist made a stronger appeal. To watch the marvellous speed with which he transferred to paper the beauty which he saw with an unerring eye was a pleasure of which one never tired. In later years, he was developing an accuracy of detail and a variety of techniques, which seemed to hold the highest promise. Of what he did for drawing at Eton, it is impossible to speak too highly; and his success as one of the most popular and best beloved of house masters was so remarkable that it might have been grudged to anyone but him

Powell's sister Ellen married fellow Olympian Harold Barker.

== See also ==
- List of Cambridge University Boat Race crews
