= Douglas Stuart (rower) =

British rower

Olympic medal record

Men's rowing
Bronze medal – third place	1908 London	Eight

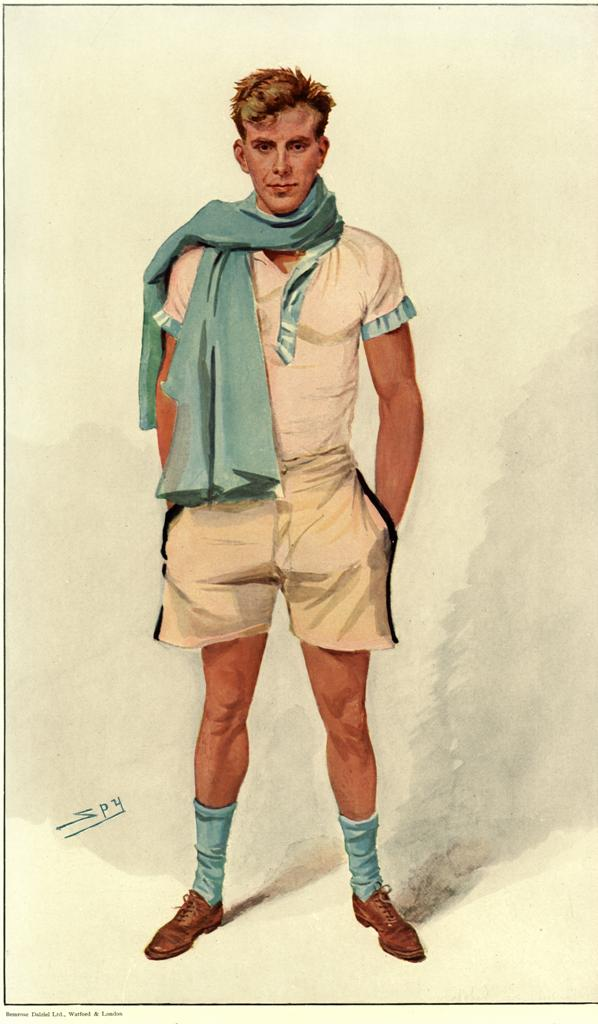
D C R Stuart "Duggie" (Vanity Fair caricatures)

Douglas Cecil Rees Stuart (1 March 1885 – 1969) was a British rower who competed in the 1908 Summer Olympics.

Stuart was the son of Montague Pelham Stuart, of Steynton, Surbiton and his wife Mary Rees. He was educated at Cheltenham College, where he received his boating colours. He rowed for Kingston Rowing Club and in 1903, at the age of 17 was runner up with C M Steele in the Silver Goblets at Henley Royal Regatta. Two years later, in 1905, he partnered Charles Vincent Fox for the London Rowing Club, and they only just failed to win the Silver Goblets.

Stuart went on to Trinity Hall, Cambridge. He won the Colquhoun Sculls, and his Trinity Hall crew was head of the river in 1907. He stroked three successive Cambridge crews to victory in 1906, 1907 and 1908. He was the strokeman of the Cambridge University boat in the eights, which won the bronze medal for Great Britain rowing at the 1908 Summer Olympics. In 1909 his Trinity Hall crew were again Head of the River. He was president of the C.U.B.C. in 1909, but the crew lost to Oxford that year.

Stuart became a solicitor after taking a third class in the 1909 law Tripos. In the First World War, he served with the First Battalion of the Border Regiment and was badly wounded as a second lieutenant in the Battle of the Somme in July 1916. He later served as a captain in the Courts Martial. In 1920 he was appointed assistant chief clerk in the Solicitor's Department at the Inland Revenue.

Stuart's elder brother Athol Alexander Stuart also rowed for Kingston Rowing Club and won the Single Sculls triple crown.

== See also ==
- List of Cambridge University Boat Race crews
