= Banner Johnstone =

British rower

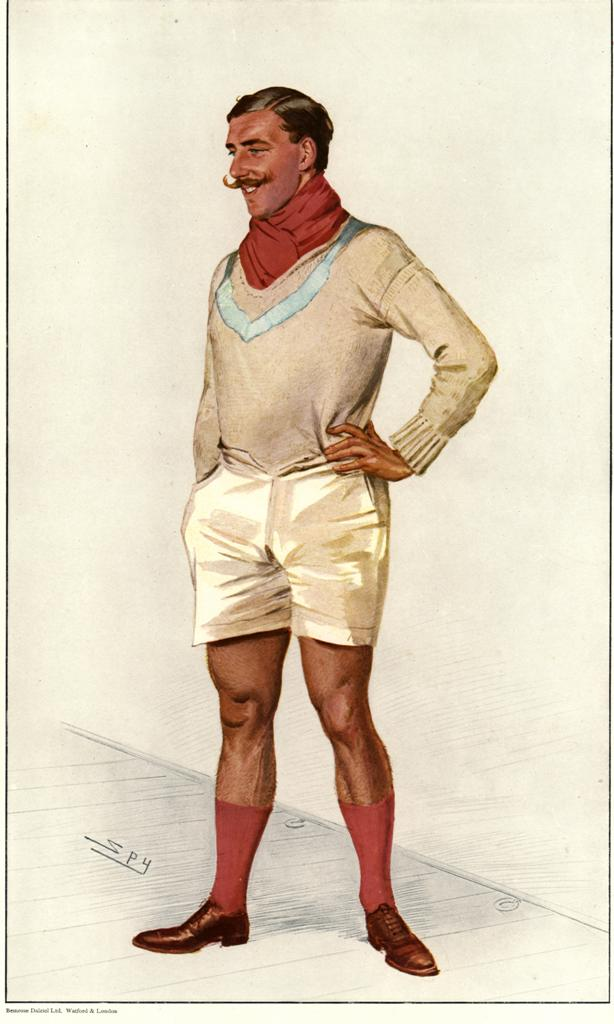
- As depicted by "Spy" (Leslie Ward) in Vanity Fair, 3 July 1907

Personal information
- Born: Banner Carruthers Johnstone; 11 November 1882 Bebington
- Died: 20 June 1964 (aged 81) Bournemouth
- Weight: 81 kg (179 lb)

Sport
- Sport: Rowing
- Club: Leander Club, Henley-on-Thames
Medal record
Men's rowing
Representing Great Britain
Olympic Games
Gold medal – first place	1908 London	Eight

Banner Carruthers Johnstone (11 November 1882 – 20 June 1964) was a British oarsman who competed in the 1908 Summer Olympics.

Johnstone was born in Bebington, then lived in Cheshire, and was educated at Eton, where he was captain of the boats, and at Trinity College, Cambridge, where he was a member of the Pitt Club. At Cambridge he rowed in the head of the river four times and won the pairs, fours, and double sculls. He rowed for Cambridge in the Boat Race in 1904, 1905, 1906 and 1907, being in the winning crew three times he was once President of the C.U.B.C.

After Cambridge, Johnstone joined Leander Club. At the Henley Royal Regatta, he won Silver Goblets in 1906 and 1907 with R V Powell and 1909 with Edward Gordon Williams. He twice beat Julius Beresford and Karl Vernon. He also competed in the Grand Challenge Cup in a series of contests with the Belgian Royal Club Nautique de Gand, being twice on the winning side. In 1908 he was a crew member of the Leander eight, which won the gold medal for Great Britain rowing at the 1908 Summer Olympics.

Johnstone had been commissioned a second lieutenant in the 3rd (Militia) battalion of the Black Watch in 1901 and was promoted to lieutenant on 11 October 1902. In 1909, Johnstone joined the Ceylon Government Surveys and in 1913 joined the Colonial Civil Service in Zanzibar. At the start of World War I, he was in the Transport Corps in East Africa, but went to France in 1917 with the 1st Black Watch and 1st Infantry Brigade. He was awarded the OBE for services in France and Belgium.

For many years, Johnstone was the rowing correspondent for The Daily Telegraph.

Johnstone died in Bournemouth at the age of 81.

== See also ==
- List of Cambridge University Boat Race crews
