= Hertford College Boat Club =

British rowing club

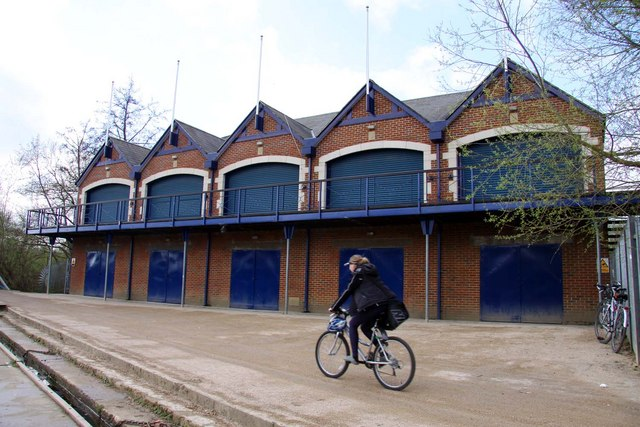

- Longbridges boathouses, shared between a number of colleges
- Coordinates: 51°44′19.3″N 1°14′47.0″W
- Home water: Isis
- Founded: 1875
- Key people: Will Neal (President); Noah Lowery (Men's Captain); Cari Hope Davies, Lucy McBride (Women's Captains)
- Head of the River: Men: 1881
- University: University of Oxford
- Colours
- Affiliations: British Rowing (boat code HEC)
- Website: hertfordcollegeboatclub.co.uk

Hertford College Boat Club (HCBC) is a rowing club for members of Hertford College, Oxford. It is based in the Longbridges boathouse on the Isis, which is owned by the college and shared with St Hilda's, St Catz, Green Templeton, and Mansfield.

The club was affiliated with Templeton College until 2008, when the latter merged to form a new college, Green Templeton College with its own boat club.

== History ==
=== Early days ===
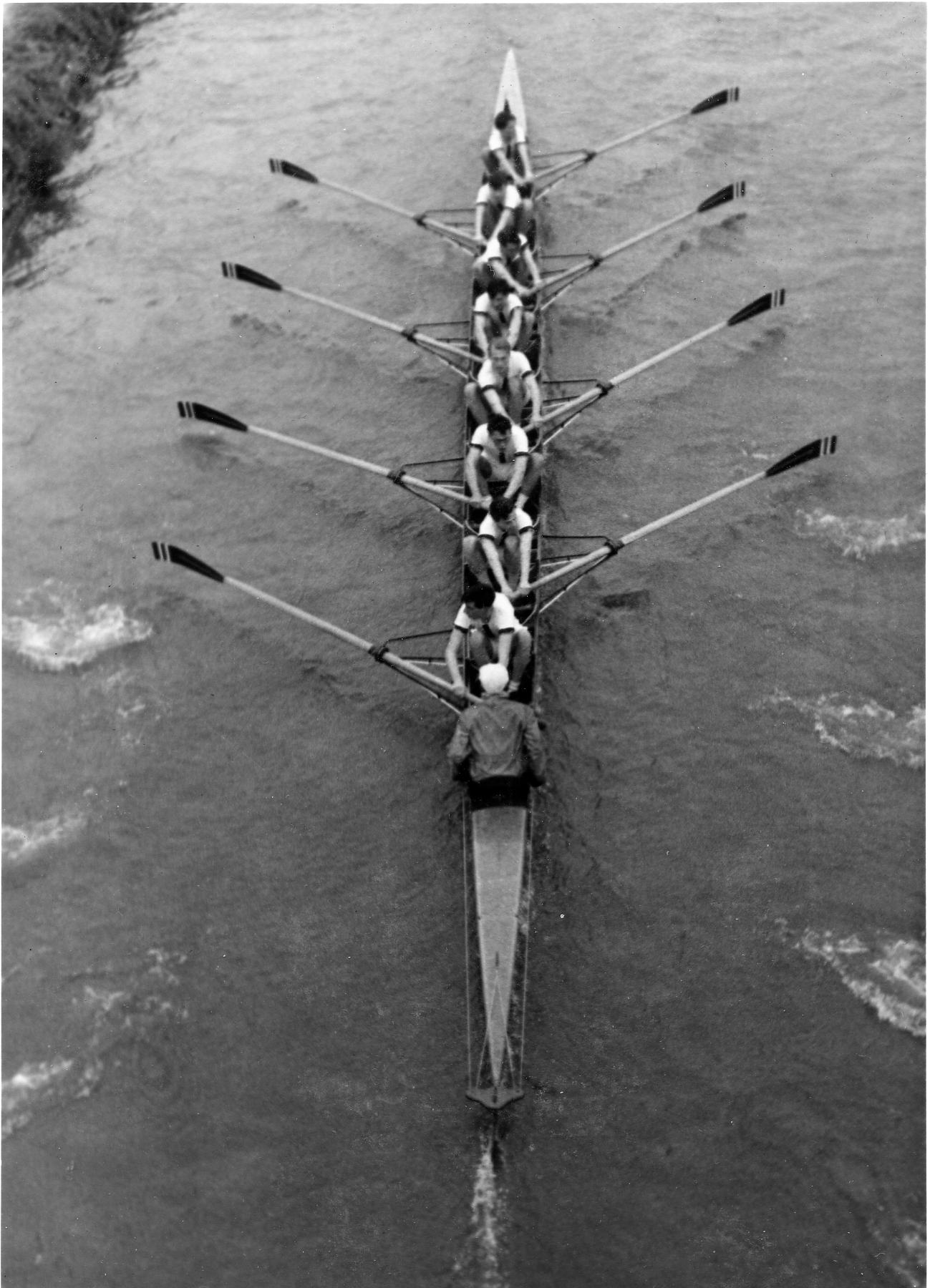
Hertford College's 1954 1st Torpid chasing St. Catz

The years after the re-foundation of the College were among the golden years of the college boat club. Hertford College was in 1874 re-founded as the new embodiment of Magdalen Hall, which was absorbed by it - (all its members being incorporated, and its buildings occupied by Hertford College). The 'Blue-Black' of the Hall had, as far as O.U.B.C. races are concerned, disappeared from the river in 1873 when their Eight was bumped over two places by Worcester College. The new Boat Club was properly started in October 1875, when the first Captain (A. F. Thornhill) was elected - and the new colours (crimson and white) of the College made their appearance on the River in the following term when the first Torpid was put on. The debut gave some promise but was not very successful, as having to change a man in the middle of the races, the boat lost the two places it had gained. The Eight went steadily from 20th to Head of the River in 1881, while only one of the Torpids had ever risen. In this last Eight there were first hands recruited from the Torpid. The first Eight made its appearance in May 1876, and rose four places. The Eight starting nineteenth in 1878, rose in that year six places to thirteenth, in 1879 five places to eighth, in 1880 three places to fifth, and in 1881 with five new hands rose the remaining four places to 'Head of the River'.

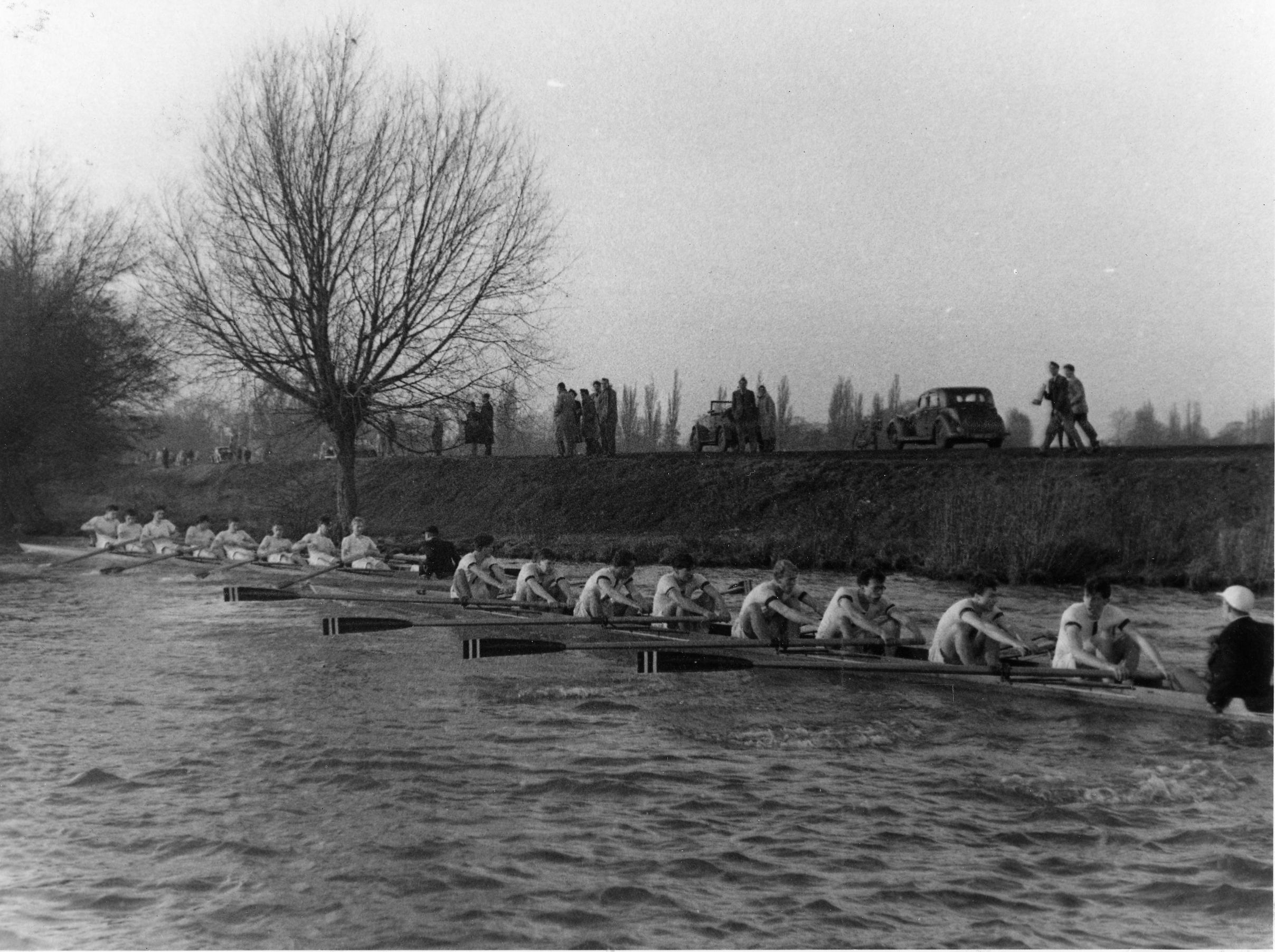
Hertford College's 1954 1st Torpid bumping Christ Church

Under the Principal Henry Boyd, in November 1878, the College acquired a Barge. Until then, the College had not really been large enough to financially support its success.

What has been done in the past is certainly due in a great measure to the hearty and practical interest which has been taken in the welfare of the College and its Boat Club. We shall hope to see this interest and enthusiasm increase with the success it has created, and if it does we are satisfied that the College will maintain a high position in the University.

— Dr. Boyd, College Principal

One consequence of being Head of the River in 1881 was that Hertford burnt its boats. The following letter was sent to T. G. Jackson, whilst he was engaged on the restoration of the Bodleian Library. It was sent by Mr Madden, sub-librarian:

Bodleian Library
26 May 1881

Dear Mr Jackson,
Last night at about 10:45 I saw out of my window a blaze of light near the Bodleian, which at once reminded me of Hertford being head of the river and of concomitant festivities, so I went and saw that not only were rockets, bombs, and every form of firework being let off in all directions (chiefly upward) in the front quad of Hertford, but also a huge bonfire was blazing just within the great gates of the College, fed with tables and chairs by a mad set of undergraduates who were chiefly occupied in dancing insanely round it. The sparks were flying straight up to about the level of the Schools tower, which, as you know is swathed in wood-work and tarpaulins. Had there been any touch of east wind there would certainly have been showers of sparks all over the tower...

No notice had been given to any of us of the obvious danger if the wind had blown towards the library and the Senior Proctor (one of the curators) had, I am told, specially sanctioned the fires... We stayed on the scaffolding until 2a.m. when the men seemed to have gone to bed but it is so striking an instance of danger in a quiet summer town that you will pardon my telling you of it...

— J. MADDEN, sub-librarian

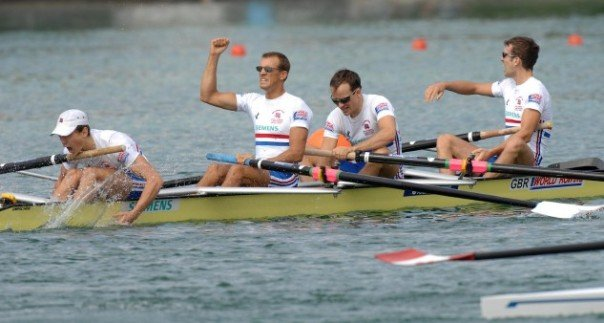
Paul Mattick wins gold at the 2007 World Rowing Championships in Munich

=== Recent years ===
1997 saw the opening of new Longbridges boathouse, which replaced the older boathouse on the same site.

The club room gives a sense of the history of the club: adorning the walls are the names of former club captains and presidents, former blues (those who have represented Oxford against Cambridge in The Boat Race, or the Henley Boat Races), and 'champions', the most notable of whom is Paul Mattick, who as part of the GB Lightweight Men's 4- crew, won gold in an extremely tight race at the 2010 World Rowing Championships in New Zealand. He was previously a world champion in the same boat class in 2007, and finished 5th in the Olympic final in Beijing. Paul began rowing at Hertford and maintains strong ties to the boat club.

Steph Cullen and Zoe Lee both also learnt to row at Hertford and have gone on to represent Great Britain. Steph became World Champion in the women's lightweight quadruple sculls event, while Zoe won Olympic silver in the women's eight.

The years since the construction of the boat house have been highly successful with both the men's and women's sides achieving numerous sets of blades (bumping up on every day of Torpids or Summer Eights). The men’s second eight most recently won blades at successive Summer Eights in 2023 and 2024, the men’s first eight won blades at Torpids 2023, and both the women’s and men’s first eights won blades at Torpids 2015 (a first in the college’s history), and again in 2025. In the 2026 Head of the River Race, the men's first eight won the Small Academic Pennant.

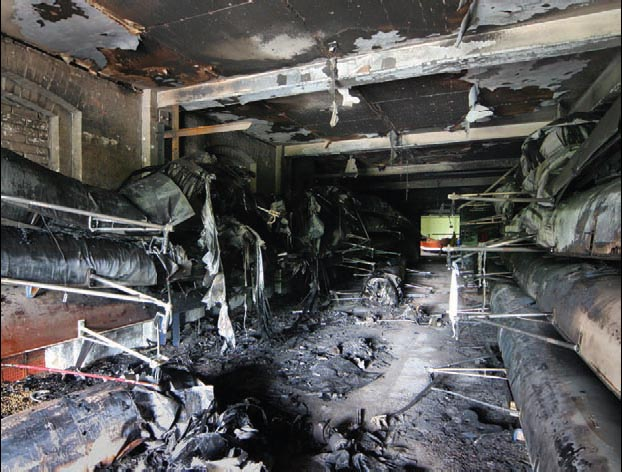
View of the devastation following the fire at the Longbridges boathouse in 2005

=== Fire ===
On Monday 4 July 2005, the Longbridges Boathouse that accommodates Hertford and several other college boat clubs was damaged by fire. In an incident that the police identified as arson, the building was undamaged, but twenty-six boats were destroyed by the heat of the fire. The boat storage area as well as two clubrooms suffered severe smoke damage.

Upon investigation the cause of the fire was attributed to incendiary devices which had been placed in the boat bays. Responsibility for the fire was claimed by members of the Oxford Arson Squad via the ALF's group website. The fire wiped out the entire fleet of eights, including the newly acquired Women's Filippi; however, the small boats, stored in a different bay, were undamaged. Insurance cover allowed the club to replace all the destroyed boats with ones of equal or greater quality.

== Facilities ==
=== Boat fleet ===
The boat club maintains and aims to buy a new eight every three years.

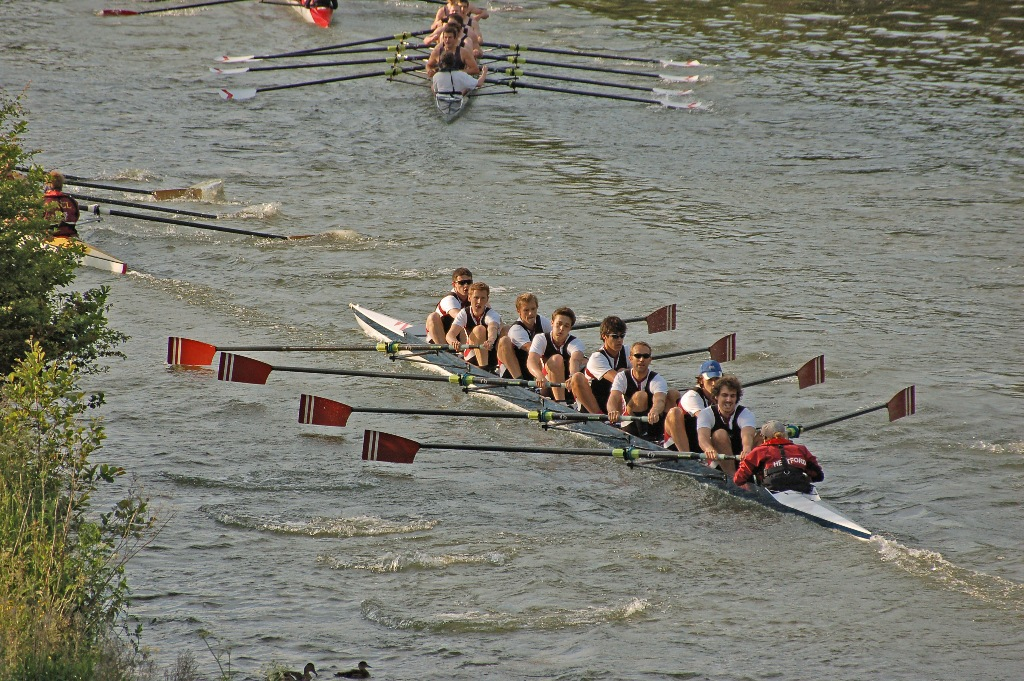
M1 at Eights 2007

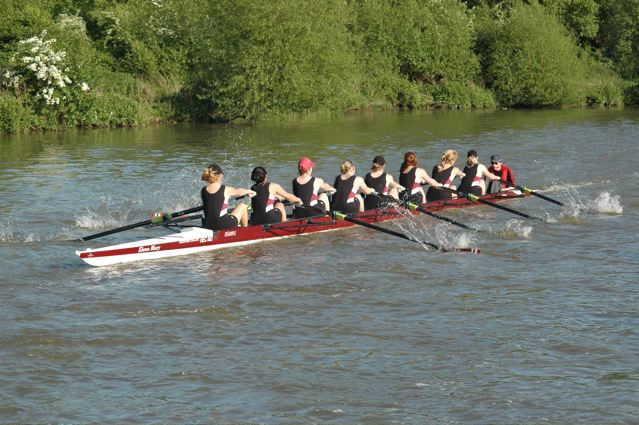
W1 at Eights 2007

Men's Boats

- Filippi 8+ (2022)
- Janousek 8+ (2023)
- Janousek 8+ (2005)
- Filippi F19 4+ (2010)
- Janousek 4+

Women's Boats

- Filippi 8+ (2022)
- KIRS 17.2 8+ (2011)
- Janousek 8+ (2005)
- Stelph 4+/x (2005)

Shared

- Lola Aylings 2x/-
- Filippi 1x (2007)
- ERB 1x
- Stelph 1x
- Janousek 1x

=== Erg room ===
The club has access to the Longbridges boat house erg room containing 8 Concept 2 Model D ergs (and sliders) and 4 refurbished Concept 2 Model C ergs. In addition, the club also owns four Concept 2 Model C ergs and a Rowperfect machine which are located in the club room.

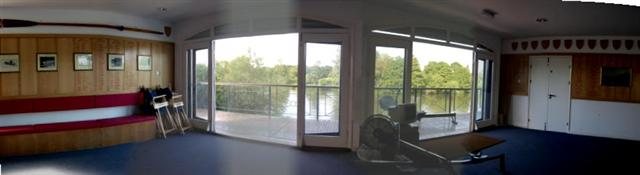
View of the Club Room

=== Club room ===
Above the boat bays is a large club room overlooking the Isis, used for land training and social events. Adjoining this space are changing and showering facilities for men and women and a kitchen/bar area.

== Hertford Rowing Bursary ==
The Hertford College Boat Club rowing bursaries are awards of up to £1000 a year for the students of the college who do the most to promote Hertford rowing. They are open to male and female, graduate and undergraduate students.

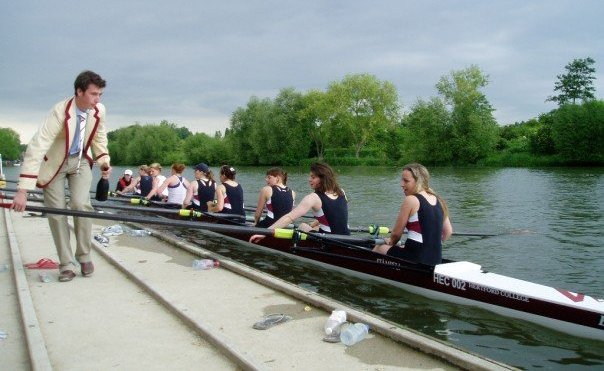

== Society ==
Hertford has a strong rowing history, and this is reflected by the active role that the boat club society plays in the running of the club. Open to anyone with an interest or connection with Hertford rowing, the society is a growing organisation. The highlight of the year is the AGM. This is followed by the annual Society boat race, pitting past rowers against the current 1st VIII's, and then a formal dinner in Hall. Society members also receive the "Blades" magazine. This is published several times a year and keeps society members up to date with the recent fortunes of the club.

== Honours ==
=== Henley Royal Regatta ===
| Year | Races won |
|---|---|
| 1879 | Diamond Challenge Sculls |
| 1881 | Stewards' Challenge Cup |
| 1882 | Stewards' Challenge Cup, Silver Goblets |
| 1959 | Silver Goblets & Nickalls' Challenge Cup |

=== Boat Race representatives ===
The following rowers were part of the rowing club at the time of their participation in The Boat Race.

Men's boat race

| Year | Name |
|---|---|
| 1842 | F. T. Macdougall ^ |
| 1879 | H. W. Disney |
| 1880 | D. E. Brown |
| 1881 | E. Buck |
| 1881 | D. E. Brown |
| 1881 | E. H. Lyon + |
| 1882 | G. S. Fort |
| 1882 | E. Buck |
| 1882 | D. E. Brown |
| 1882 | E. H. Lyon + |
| 1883 | G. S. Fort |
| 1883 | A. R. Paterso |
| 1883 | G. Q. Roberts |
| 1883 | E. H. Lyon + |
| 1884 | A. R. Paterson |
| 1888 | H. Cross |
| 1958 | J. G. Rowbotham + |

| Year | Name |
|---|---|
| 1959 | J. G. Rowbotham + |
| 1968 | A. W. Painter + |
| 1987 | Paul Gleeson |
| 1988 | Paul Gleeson |
| 1988 | Michael P. Gaffney |
| 1989 | Paul Gleeson |
| 1989 | Michael P. Gaffney |
| 1990 | Michael P. Gaffney |
| 1998 | Henrik K. Nilsson |
| 1999 | Henrik K. Nilsson |
| 2001 | Ian R. W. Weighell |
| 2004 | Andrew Stubbs |
| 2023 | Tassilo von Mueller |
| 2025 | Tassilo von Mueller |
| 2026 | Felix Crabtree |

Women's boat race

| Year | Name |
|---|---|
| 2016 | Emma Lukasiewicz |
| 2019 | Issy Dodds |
| 2023 | Alison Carrington |

Key

- + = Coxswain
- ^ = rowed under the college name of Magdalen Hall

== See also ==
- Oxford University Boat Club
