= Karl Vernon =

British rower and rowing coach

- Born: 19 June 1880; Neuenahr
- Died: 11 July 1973 (aged 93); Worthing
- Occupation: Rower

Olympic medal record

Men's rowing
Silver medal – second place	1912 Stockholm	Coxed four

Karl Vernon MM (19 June 1880 – 11 July 1973), sometimes known by his nickname The Bean, was a British rower and coach who competed in the 1912 Summer Olympics.

== Life ==
Vernon was born in Neuenahr, Rheinland-Pfalz, Germany. He joined Thames Rowing Club in around 1904, first appearing at Henley Royal Regatta in 1906, with Julius Beresford as runners-up in Goblets and in a Thames Cup eight (which also included Bruce Logan). Beresford and Vernon were runners-up in Silver Goblets again in 1907 and 1908.

In the Autumn of 1907, having become frustrated by their inability to impress the Thames coaches, Vernon and Beresford formed a new four with Logan and Charlie Rought. These four (with Vernon in the 2 seat) would stay together, on and off, for the next five years, winning the Stewards' Challenge Cup at Henley in 1909 and 1911.

Then, with cox Geoffrey Carr, the Thames Rowing Club coxed four won the silver medal for Great Britain rowing at the 1912 Summer Olympics.

In the First World War, he served with the Royal Army Medical Corps and was awarded the Military Medal.

Vernon later became a regular coach at Thames and at numerous University clubs. In 1954, he had all his trophies and medals melted down and made into a trophy for the Head of the River Race.

He was Captain of Thames from 1930 to 1932 and was elected a Vice President of the Club in 1943. Outside rowing, he was an architect, spending at least some of his career at the London County Council. He also designed an extension to the Thames clubhouse. He was a talented draughtsman and sketcher; Vernon's works were frequently used as prizes in local regattas.

Vernon was a vegetarian, and this led to his lifelong nickname "The Bean".

== Achievements ==
=== Olympic Games ===
- 1912 – Silver, Coxed Four

=== Henley Royal Regatta ===
- 1909 – Stewards' Challenge Cup
- 1911 – Stewards' Challenge Cup
- 1919 Victory Regatta – Fawley Cup
