= Calman MacLennan =

British vaccinologist

Professor Calman Alexander MacLennan Doctor of Philosophy
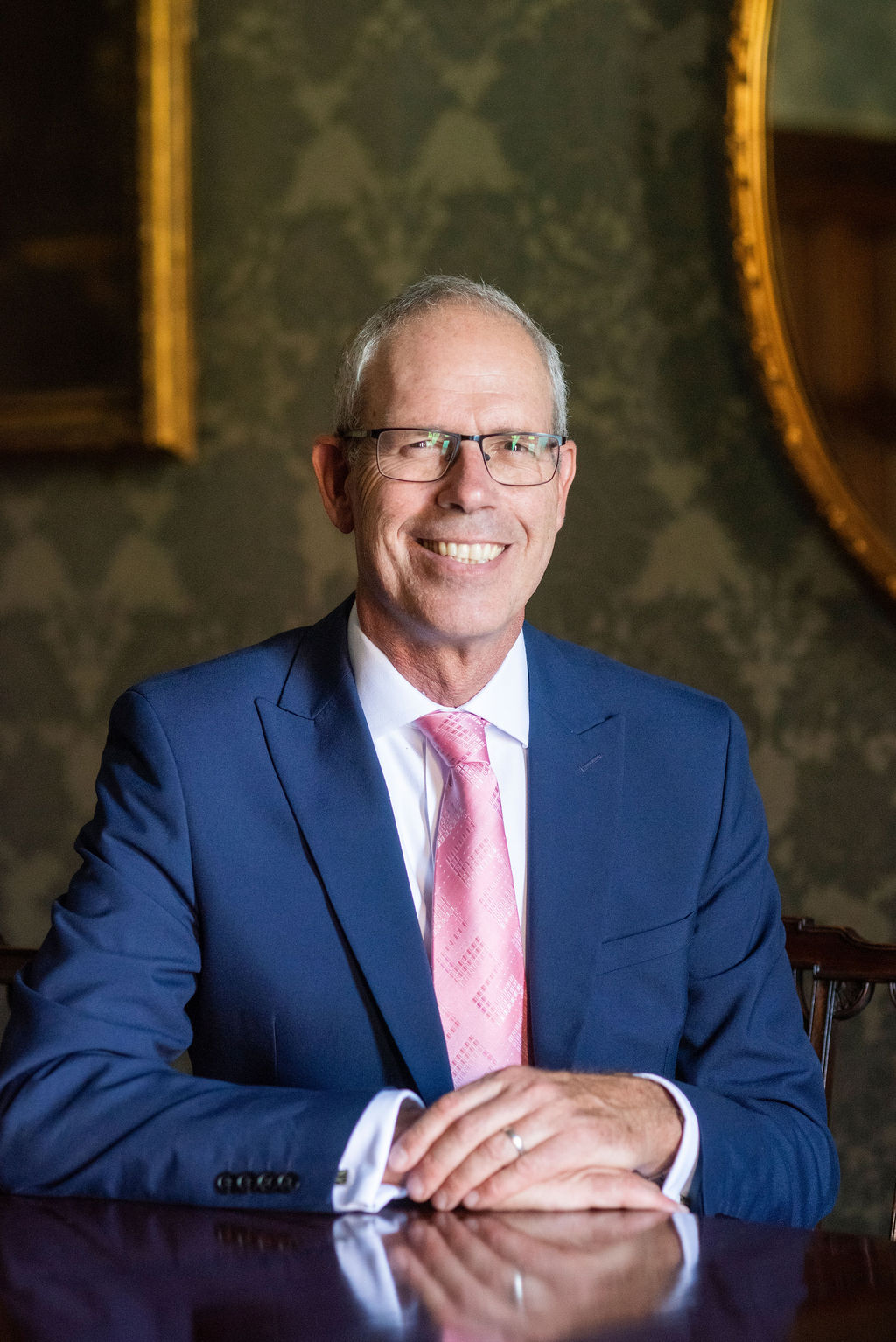
- MacLennan in 2026
- Born: Taplow, Buckinghamshire
- Citizenship: British
- Education: University of Oxford
- Alma mater: Keble College, Oxford; Green Templeton College, Oxford
- Occupations: vaccinologist; immunologist; clinician scientist
- Known for: Vaccinology
- Awards: Fellow of the Royal College of Physicians (2011); Fellow of the Royal College of Pathologists(2008)
Calman MacLennan
Personal information
- National team: Team GB
- Citizenship: United Kingdom
Sport
- Sport: Rowing
- side-by-side rowing: The Boat Race 1989; The Boat Race 1991; The Boat Race 1992
- University team: University of Oxford
Achievements and titles
- National finals: 1st place (gold); Men's Single Sculls; 1992 British Rowing Championships

Calman Alexander MacLennan is a British vaccinologist, immunologist and clinician scientist who specialises in bacterial vaccines and vaccines as tools against anti-microbial resistance (AMR). His interdisciplinary work spans academia, industry and philanthropy. He is a professor at Imperial College London and the University of Birmingham, where he was the founding director of the BactiVac Network, and a consultant immunologist at the Oxford University Hospitals NHS Foundation Trust. He previously worked at Novartis, the Jenner Institute, the Gates Foundation and Pfizer. He has competed for Team GB and the University of Oxford in individual and team rowing.

== Early life and education ==
MacLennan studied medicine at Keble College and Green Templeton College, Oxford, completing his clinical studies in 1992 and a DPhil in neuroscience and medicine in 1998. He competed in rowing for the University of Oxford in the 1989, 1991, and 1992 Boat Races, and for Team GB in the 1993 and 1995 World Rowing Championships and was a reserve at the 1996 Atlanta Olympics. He won the men's single sculls at the 1992 British Rowing Championships.

== Career ==
After his doctoral studies, he worked as a house officer with the Nuffield Department of Medicine at the John Radcliffe Hospital. During this period, he developed an interest in immunity to infection and moved from neurology to immunology and infectious diseases. He worked in Blantyre, Malawi and Kilifi, Kenya, investigating immunity to major tropical diseases, and trained in clinical immunology in Birmingham, while researching the role of antibodies in protective immunity against invasive Salmonella.

Later, he became a professor of vaccine immunology at the University of Birmingham and a consultant immunologist at the Oxford University Hospitals NHS Foundation Trust. From 2010, he served as head of the exploratory programme at the Novartis Vaccines Institute for Global Health in Siena, Italy, where he contributed to the development of bacterial vaccines against Salmonella, Shigella, and the meningococcus bacterium, including the Vi-CRM197 typhoid conjugate vaccine, marketed as TYPHIBEV.

Following the acquisition of Novartis Vaccines by GSK Plc in 2015, he returned to the University of Oxford to work at the Jenner Institute. He was appointed a Jenner Investigator and vaccine research group leader, and was awarded an MRC Senior Clinical Research Fellowship. His work at the Jenner Institute included research on vaccine development for gonorrhoea. In 2017, he joined the Gates Foundation as a senior program officer for bacterial vaccines in the enterics, diagnostics and genomic epidemiology team. In this role, he led product development portfolios for Shigella and Salmonella vaccines. In the same year, he founded the global bacterial vaccinology network, BactiVac.

In 2024, he became vice president for Vaccine Clinical Research at Pfizer, responsible for Pfizer's pneumococcal and meningococcal vaccine clinical franchises. In 2026, he left Pfizer, founded his own consulting company and was appointed a visiting professor at Imperial College London.

== Selected publications ==
Year	Publication	Journal	Details
2004	Failure to clear persistent vaccine-derived neurovirulent poliovirus infection in an immunodeficient man.	Lancet	MacLennan C, Dunn G, Huissoon AP, Kumararatne DS, Martin J, O’Leary P, Thompson RA, Osman H, Wood P, Minor P, Wood DJ, Pillay D. Failure to clear persistent vaccine-derived neurovirulent poliovirus infection in an immunodeficient man. Lancet 2004; 363: 1509–13.
2004	Interleukin-12 and/or interleukin-23 are key cytokines for immunity against in humans	J Infect Dis	MacLennan C, Fieschi C, Lammas DA, Picard C, Sanal O, MacLennan JM, Holland SM, Ottenhoff THM, Casanova JL, Kumararatne DS. Interleukin-12 and/or interleukin-23 are key cytokines for immunity against in humans. J Infect Dis 2004;190: 1755–7.
2008	The neglected role of antibody in protection against bacteremia caused by nontyphoidal strains of Salmonella in African children.	J Clin Inv	MacLennan CA, Gondwe EN, Msefula CL, Kingsley RA, Thomson NR, White SA, Goodall M, Pickard DJ, Graham SM, Dougan GD, Hart CA, Molyneux ME, Drayson MT. The neglected role of antibody in protection against bacteremia caused by nontyphoidal strains of Salmonella in African children. J Clin Inv 2008; 118: 1553–1562.
2010	Importance of antibody and complement for oxidative burst and killing of invasive nontyphoidal Salmonella by blood cells in Africans.	Proc Natl Acad Sci, USA	Gondwe EN, Molyneux ME, Goodall M, Mastroeni P, Graham SM, Drayson MT, MacLennan CA. Importance of antibody and complement for oxidative burst and killing of invasive nontyphoidal Salmonella by blood cells in Africans. Proc Natl Acad Sci, USA 2010; 107: 3070–3075.
2010	Dysregulated humoral immunity to nontyphoidal Salmonella in HIV-infected African adults.	Science	MacLennan CA, Gilchrist JJ, Gordon MA, Cunningham AF, Cobbold MC, Goodall M, Kingsley RA, Van Oosterhout JJG, Msefula CL, Mandala WL, Leyton DL, Marshall JL, Gondwe EN, Bobat S, López-Macías C, Doffinger R, Henderson IR, Zijlstra EE, Dougan G, Drayson MT, MacLennan ICM, Molyneux ME. Dysregulated humoral immunity to nontyphoidal Salmonella in HIV-infected African adults. Science 2010; 328: 508–512.
2013	Development of a glycoconjugate vaccine to prevent meningitis in Africa caused by meningococcal serogroup X.	Proc Natl Acad Sci USA	Micoli F, Romano MR, Tontini M, Cappelletti E, Gavini M, Proietti D, Rondini S, Swennen E, Santini L, Filippini S, Balocchi C, Adamo R, Pluschke, Norheim G, Pollard AJ, Saul A, Rappuoli R, MacLennan CA, Berti F, Costantino P. Development of a glycoconjugate vaccine to prevent meningitis in Africa caused by meningococcal serogroup X. Proc Natl Acad Sci USA 2013; 110: 19077–82.
2014	A broadly-protective vaccine against meningococcal disease in sub-Saharan Africa based on generalized modules for membrane antigens (GMMA).	Vaccine	Koeberling O, Ispasanie E, Hauser J, Rossi O, Pluschke G, Caugant DA, Saul A, MacLennan CA. A broadly-protective vaccine against meningococcal disease in sub-Saharan Africa based on generalized modules for membrane antigens (GMMA). Vaccine 2014; 32: 2688–95.
2018	Comparative immunogenicity and efficacy of equivalent outer membrane vesicle and glycoconjugate vaccines against nontyphoidal Salmonella.	Proc Natl Acad Sci USA	Micoli F, Rondini S, Alfini R, Lanzilao L, Necchi F, Negrea A, Rossi O, Brandt C, Clare S, Mastroeni P, Rappuoli R, Saul A, MacLennan CA. Comparative immunogenicity and efficacy of equivalent outer membrane vesicle and glycoconjugate vaccines against nontyphoidal Salmonella. Proc Natl Acad Sci USA 2018; 115: 10428–33.
2020	Short Vi-polysaccharide abrogates T-independent immune response and hyporesponsiveness elicited by long Vi-CRM197 conjugate vaccine.	Proc Natl Acad Sci USA	Micoli F, Bjarnarson SP, Arcuri M, Pind AAA, Magnusdottir GJ, Necchi F, Di Benedetto R, Carducci M, Schiavo F, Giannelli C, Pisoni I, Martin LB, Del Giudice G, MacLennan CA, Rappuoli R, Jonsdottir I, Saul A. Short Vi-polysaccharide abrogates T-independent immune response and hyporesponsiveness elicited by long Vi-CRM197 conjugate vaccine. Proc Natl Acad Sci USA 2020 Sep 29;117(39):24443-24449. doi: 10.1073/pnas.2005857117. Epub 2020 Sep 8. PMID 32900928
2023	Clinical and regulatory development strategies for Shigella vaccines intended for uptake and impact in infants and young children, living in low- and middle-income countries.	Lancet Glob Health	Giersing BK, Isbrucker R, Kaslow DC, Cavaleri M, Baylor N, Maiga D, Pavlinac P, Riddle M, Kang G, MacLennan CA. Clinical and regulatory development strategies for Shigella vaccines intended for uptake and impact in infants and young children, living in low- and middle-income countries. Lancet Glob Health 2023 Nov;11(11):e1819-e1826. doi: 10.1016/S2214-109X(23)00421-7. PMID 37858591
