= Frederick Septimus Kelly =

Australian-English rower, composer (1881–1916)

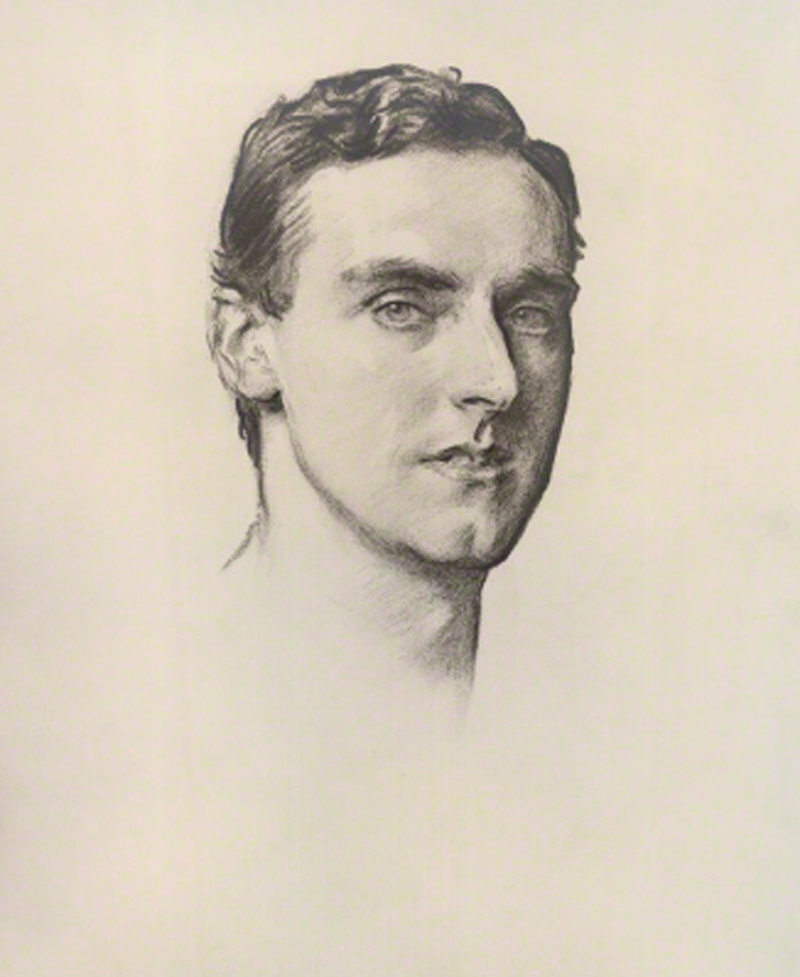
- F.S. Kelly (John Singer Sargent, 1915)

Personal information
- Born: Frederick Septimus Kelly; 29 May 1881 Sydney, Australia
- Died: 13 November 1916 (aged 35) Beaucourt-sur-l'Ancre, France
- Education: Sydney Grammar School; Eton College; Balliol College, Oxford; Hoch Conservatory, Frankfurt
- Weight: 77 kg (170 lb)

Sport
- Sport: Rowing
- Club: Leander Club, Henley-on-Thames
Medal record
Representing Great Britain
Summer Olympics
Gold medal – first place	1908 London	Eight

Frederick Septimus Kelly DSC (29 May 1881 – 13 November 1916) was an Australian and British musician and composer and a rower who competed for Britain in the 1908 Summer Olympics. He joined the Royal Naval Volunteer Reserve during WWI and, after surviving the Gallipoli campaign, he was killed in action in the Battle of the Somme.

== Early life ==
Kelly, the fourth son and seventh child of Irish-born woolbroker Thomas Hussey Kelly and his wife Mary Anne (née Dick) was born in 1881 at 47 Phillip Street, Sydney. Kelly was educated at Sydney Grammar School when his family lived in Glenyarrah in Double Bay. He then went with his family to England and was educated at Eton College, where he stroked the school eight to victory in the Ladies' Challenge Plate at Henley Royal Regatta in 1899.

Kelly studied music at Eton under Charles Harford Lloyd and was awarded a Lewis Nettleship musical scholarship at Oxford in 1899. At Balliol College, Oxford (BA, 1903; MA, 1912), he was mentored by Donald Tovey. He was a protégé of Ernest Walker.

== Rowing ==
Kelly took up sculling while at Oxford and won the Diamond Challenge Sculls at Henley in 1902, beating Raymond Etherington-Smith in the final.

He rowed in the four seat for Oxford against Cambridge in the 1903 Boat Race. Oxford lost the race by six lengths. Kelly went on to win the Diamond sculls at Henley again that summer, beating Julius Beresford in the final. He also won the Wingfield Sculls, the Amateur Championship of the Thames, beating the holder Arthur Cloutte. This was the only occasion on which he entered.

On leaving Oxford in 1903, he started rowing at Leander Club and was in the Leander crews, which won the Grand Challenge Cup at Henley in 1903, 1904, and 1905 and the Stewards' Challenge Cup in 1906. In 1905, he won the Diamond Sculls again, beating Harry Blackstaffe. In 1908 he competed at the London Olympic Games for the Leander crew in the eights. The crew won the gold medal for Great Britain.

Contemporary reports of Kelly's oarsmanship were glowing: 'his natural sense of poise and rhythm made his boat a live thing under him'; 'Many think [Kelly] the greatest amateur stylist of all time'.

== Health ==
In 1907, Kelly became worried about problems with his hands and arms that were impeding his performance, especially as a musician. He also developed a facial tic. He sought hypnotherapeutic treatment for this condition from J. Milne Bramwell, the specialist medical hypnotist in London. He attended Bramwell's rooms for treatment over an extended time.

== Musician ==
After leaving Oxford with fourth-class honours in history, Kelly studied composition with Iwan Knorr and piano with Ernst Engesser at the Hoch Conservatory in Frankfurt. At this time, he met and became a close friend of Leonard Borwick, probably England's finest pianist at the time.

He performed with Pablo Casals. He helped organise a concert in London by Maurice Ravel, on 17 December 1913 at the Bechstein Hall. At the concert, Kelly played four solo piano pieces by Alexander Scriabin and performed the Phantasy piano quintet by James Friskin, with the English String Quartet.

== Wartime ==
Following the outbreak of war in 1914, Kelly was commissioned into the Royal Naval Volunteer Reserve for service with the Royal Naval Division with his friends—the poet Rupert Brooke, the critic and composer William Denis Browne, and others of what became known as the Latin Club.

At Gallipoli, he wrote his scores in his tent at base camp, including his tribute to Brooke, Elegy for String Orchestra: "In Memoriam Rupert Brooke" (1915), conceived in the wake of Brooke's death. Kelly was among the party who buried him on Skyros.

The following is a description of Kelly's close connection to Brooke, taken from Race Against Time: the Diaries of F.S. Kelly:

On 22 April 1915, Kelly became aware that Rupert Brooke was dangerously ill. The following day Brooke died and was buried on Skyros by his close circle, the officers known as the Latin Club – the critic and composer, W. Denis Browne; Arthur (Ock) Asquith (later Brigadier-General Arthur Asquith); the scholar and son of Lord Ribblesdale, Charles Lister; Patrick H. Shaw-Stewart, scholar and, at the age of 25, a director of Barings Bank; Bernard Freyberg (later General Lord Freyberg VC and Governor-General of New Zealand); and 'Cleg' Kelly. Kelly's measured description of both the death and burial of the poet have been extensively quoted in the Brooke literature. It was W. Denis Browne and Kelly who sorted Brooke's belongings as their ship left Skyros for the Gallipoli peninsula, and it was Kelly, methodical as ever, who copied the contents of the poet's notebook against its loss in transit to his family. After the Hood Battalion left England, the friendship between Kelly and Brooke had deepened. There are frequent references to their being together on group outings on leave, nights spent together at the dinner table, of W. Denis Browne and Kelly entertaining their fellow officers with Brooke to the fore, and, towards the end, accounts of Brooke coming alone to Kelly's cabin to read his poems and to discuss literature. Brooke's death was a personal loss. Kelly is said to have begun composing his Elegy dedicated to Brooke as the poet lay dying nearby.

Kelly's grave at Martinsart

Kelly returned to active service after Gallipoli and died at Beaucourt-sur-l'Ancre, France, when rushing a German machine gun post in the last days of the Battle of the Somme in November 1916. He was 35. Kelly is the only one of the dozen composers killed at the Somme to have a marked grave. His men retrieved his body and carried it back through No Man's Land. He was buried in Martinsart's British Cemetery, not far from where he fell.

== Posthumous renown ==
Kelly's final piece was the Somme Lament, completed in October 1916, just two weeks before he died during the Somme campaign. It was completed in piano score. Christopher Latham orchestrated the work for a 2020 recording. At the memorial concert held at the Wigmore Hall, London on 2 May 1919, some of his piano compositions were played by Leonard Borwick, and some of his songs were sung by Muriel Foster. The centrepiece of the concert was the Elegy for String Orchestra, written at Gallipoli in memory of Rupert Brooke, a work of profound feeling. Frank Bridge was the conductor – he had conducted its first performance at Rugby School on 28 March 1916.

On 6 March 1918, Fellow Australian composer Ernest Truman played a tribute in memorial to Frederick Septimus Kelly written by his former tutor Charles Harford Lloyd.

Kelly's "Serenade for Flute" with accompaniment of Harp, Horn, and String Orchestra (Op. 7), written in 1911, received its first recording 100 years after he composed it, by the Canadian flautist Rebecca Hall for Cameo Classics. José Garcia Gutierrez was the horn soloist with the Malta Philharmonic Orchestra conducted by its musical director, Michael Laus.

His piano works include the 12 Studies, Op. 9 (1907–13) and 24 Monographs, Op. 11 (1911–16) in all the major and minor keys, as well as a set of etudes, modelled on Chopin and Scriabin. The Preludes and Monographs have been recorded by Alex Wilson. There are two recordings of the Violin Sonata Gallipoli from 1915. In 2023 Toccata issued first performance recordings of three chamber music works: the first Violin Sonata in D minor (1901), the Piano Trio (1905), and the Serenade for flute and piano, Op.7 (1911).

== Family ==
Unmarried, he had lived at his home, Bisham Grange, near Marlow, Buckinghamshire, with his sister Mary (Maisie). There is a memorial to him in the village of Bisham. His elder brother, William Henry "Willie" Kelly, was a politician who held the seat of Wentworth in the Australian House of Representatives from 1903 to 1919.

Kelly's papers are held in the National Library of Australia.

== Compositions ==
- Two Songs, Op. 1 (1902)
- Aghadoe, an Irish Ballad, for contralto and orchestra (edited by Richard Divall)
- Waltz-Pageant, Op. 2, for piano; arranged for two pianos (1905, rev. 1911)
- Allegro de concert, Op. 3, for piano (1907)
- A Cycle of Lyrics, Op. 4, for piano (1908)
- Theme, Variations and Fugue, Op. 5, for two pianos (1907–11)
- Six Songs, Op. 6 (1910–13)
- Serenade in E minor, Op. 7, for flute with accompaniment of harp, horn and string orchestra (1911). (This was recorded by Rebecca Hall with the Malta Philharmonic Orchestra and conducted by Michael Laus for Cameo Classics in 2011). Edited by Richard Divall, 2014
- String Trio in B minor (1913–14). Edited by Richard Divall
- Piano Trio for violin, violoncello and piano in B-flat. Edited by Richard Divall
- Piece for horn, violin, viola and pianoforte. Edited by Richard Divall
- Movement for English horn and piano. Edited by Richard Divall
- Two Preludes for Organ (1914) Published by Marshall-Hall Trust. Edited by Bruce Steele
- Elegy, In Memoriam Rupert Brooke for harp and strings (1915) Published by Marshall-Hall Trust. Edited by Richard Divall who has made a reduction of the work for String Quintet (2 violins, viola and 2 cellos).
- Violin Sonata in G major Gallipoli (1915). Edited by Richard Divall and Christopher Latham
- Violin Sonata in D minor, unfinished. Edited by Richard Divall
- Piano Sonata in F minor, unfinished (1916). Published by Marshall-Hall Trust. Edited by Richard Divall and Bruce Steele, 2005
- 12 Studies, Op. 9, for piano (1915). Published by Marshall-Hall Trust. Edited by Richard Divall and Bruce Steele, 2005
- 24 Monographs, Op. 11, for piano (1915). Published by Marshall-Hall Trust. Edited by Richard Divall and Bruce Steele, 2005
- Suite in Eb Major for Orchestra (1906-1908) Edited by Christopher Latham and Gwynn Davies
- Five unpublished songs. Edited by Richard Divall

== See also ==
- List of Olympians killed in World War I
- List of Oxford University Boat Race crews
