= Philippi (disambiguation) =

Philippi was an ancient town in Macedonia, Greece, near the municipality of Filippoi.

Philippi may also refer to:

== Places ==
- Caesarea Philippi, an ancient Roman town in the Golan Heights
- Philippi (Caria), an ancient town in Caria, now in Turkey
- Philippi, West Virginia, a city in the United States
- Philippi, Cape Town, South Africa, one of the larger and newest of the Cape's townships

== Battles of Philippi ==
- Battle of Philippi (42 BC), a Roman Civil War battle
- Battle of Philippi (West Virginia) (1861), an American Civil War battle

== Other ==
- Philippi (surname)
- Philippi (Rome) an episode from the HBO TV series Rome
- The Philippi Collection, private collection of religious headgear

== See also ==
- Filippi
