= Charles Rought =

British rower

Personal information
- Born: 16 October 1884 Surbiton, England
- Died: 31 January 1919 (aged 34) Lambeth, London, England
Medal record
Men's rowing
Representing United Kingdom
Olympic Games
Silver medal – second place	1912 Stockholm	Men's coxed four

Charles Gardner Rought (16 October 1884 – 31 January 1919) was a British rower who competed in the 1912 Summer Olympics.

== Life ==
Rought was born in Surbiton. He became a member of Thames Rowing Club and in 1909 and 1911 was a member of the crew that won the Stewards' Challenge Cup at Henley Royal Regatta. Also in the 1911 regatta, Rought and Bruce Logan dead heated in a heat of Silver Goblets against the eventual winners Julius Beresford and Arthur Cloutte to set a course record which lasted until 1934. A year later in 1912 Rought and Logan won Silver Goblets. Rought was a member of the Thames Rowing Club coxed four which won the silver medal for Great Britain rowing at the 1912 Summer Olympics.

Rought saw service in the First World War in the Royal West Surrey Regiment but spent much of the conflict as a Prisoner of War. Rought died in the Lambeth district aged 34. The cause of death was a bad oyster. Since Rought was awaiting demobilisation at the time, he technically died on active service.

== Achievements ==
=== Olympic Games ===
- 1912 - Silver, Coxed Four

=== Henley Royal Regatta ===
- 1909 - Stewards' Challenge Cup
- 1911 - Stewards' Challenge Cup
- 1912 - Silver Goblets & Nickalls' Challenge Cup (with Bruce Logan)
- 1919 Victory Regatta – Fawley Cup
