= Bruce Logan (rower) =

British rower

Olympic medal record

Men's rowing
Silver medal – second place	1912 Stockholm	Coxed four

Hubert Bruce Logan (2 March 1886 – 24 November 1965) was a British rower who competed in the 1912 Summer Olympics.

== Life ==
Logan was born at Chesterton, Cambridge, the son of John Maxwell Samuel Logan and his wife Alice Mary Bullard. He became a member of Thames Rowing Club and, in 1909 and 1911, was a member of the crew that won the Stewards' Challenge Cup at Henley Royal Regatta. Also in the 1911 regatta, Logan and Charles Rought dead heated in a heat of Silver Goblets against the eventual winners Julius Beresford and Arthur Cloutte to set a course record which lasted until 1934. A year later in 1912 Rought and Logan won Silver Goblets. He was the strokeman of the Thames Rowing Club coxed four which won the silver medal for Great Britain rowing at the 1912 Summer Olympics.

== Achievements ==
=== Olympic Games ===
- 1912 – Silver, Coxed Four

=== Henley Royal Regatta ===
- 1909 – Stewards' Challenge Cup
- 1911 – Stewards' Challenge Cup
- 1912 – Silver Goblets & Nickalls' Challenge Cup (with Charles Rought)
- 1919 Victory Regatta – Fawley Cup
