= Philippi (surname) =

Philippi is a surname. Notable people with the surname include:

- Alfred Philippi (1903–1994), German general WWII
- Andreas Philippi (born 1965), German surgeon and politician
- Bernhard Eunom Philippi, aka Bernardo Philippi (1811–1852), German naturalist and explorer
- Donald Philippi (1930–1993), American translator of Japanese
- Federico Philippi (1838–1910), German zoologist and botanist, son of Rodolfo Amando Philippi
- Friedrich Adolf Philippi (1809–1882), Lutheran theologian
- Friedrich Philippi (historian) (1853–1930), German archivist and historian
- Mark Philippi (born 1963), American powerlifter
- Rodolfo Amando Philippi (1808–1904), German-Chilean zoologist and botanist
- Waldemar Philippi (1929–1990), German footballer

== See also ==
- Filippi, a surname
