= Stewards' Challenge Cup =

Event at the Henley Royal Regatta

- Venue: Henley Royal Regatta, River Thames
- Location: Henley-on-Thames, Oxfordshire
- Dates: 1841 – present

The Stewards' Challenge Cup is a rowing event for men's coxless fours at the annual Henley Royal Regatta on the River Thames at Henley-on-Thames in England. It is open to male crews from all eligible rowing clubs. Two or more clubs may combine to make an entry.

The event was established in 1841. It was originally for coxed four crews. In 1868 Walter Bradford Woodgate arranged for his Brasenose cox to jump overboard at the start of the race to lighten his boat. While the unwanted cox narrowly escaped strangulation by the water lilies, Woodgate and his home-made steering device triumphed by 100 yards and were promptly disqualified. Whatever passing fame the hapless cox gained on the Henley reach in 1868 was eventually eclipsed by his accomplishments in later life when he, Frederic Edward Weatherly, wrote and published the Irish ballad "Danny Boy".

A special prize for four-oared crews without coxswains was offered at the regatta in 1869 when it was won by the Oxford Radleian Club. When Stewards' became a coxless race in 1873, Woodgate "won his moral victory", the Rowing Almanack later recalled. "Nothing but defeating a railway in an action at law could have given him so much pleasure."

== Past winners ==
=== 1841–1872 ===
Stewards' Challenge Cup – Coxed four
Year	Winner	Crew	Time	Dist	Runner-up	ref
1841	The Midge, Oxford Club, London	D. Stuart, J. J. Rogers, P. L. Powys, S. E. Maberley (stroke), Mackintosh (cox)	10min+	1l	Cambridge Subscription Rooms, London	
1842	The Midge, Oxford Club, London	D. Stuart, T. J. Pocock, P. L. Powys, S. E. Maberley (stroke), H. Churchill (cox)	9:16	E	Dreadnought Club, Henley	
1843	St George's Club, London	G. Jeffreys, J. Hodding, G. Collier, T. B. Bumpsted (stroke), A. Johnson (cox)	10:15	2l	The Midge, Oxford Club, London	
1844	Oxford University	W. Chetwynd-Stapylton, W. J. Dry, F. M. Wilson, F. E. Tuke (stroke), G. B. Lewis (cox)	9:16	1 1/4l	St George's Club, London	
1845	Oxford University	W. Chetwynd-Stapylton, W. H. Milman, J. W. Conant, F. M. Wilson (stroke), G. B. Lewis (cox)	8:25	Aw	St George's Club, London	
1846	Oxford University	W. Chetwynd-Stapylton, F. M. Wilson, J. W. Conant, W. H. Milman (stroke), M. Haggard (cox)	ntt	E	Guy's Club, London	
1847	Christ Church, Oxford	A. Milman, M. Haggard, E. C. Burton, W. H. Milman (stroke), H. W. P. Richards (cox)		ro	Worcester College (withdrew)	
1848	Christ Church, Oxford	A. Milman, M. Haggard, E. C. Burton, W. H. Milman (stroke), R. W. Cotton (cox)		ro	Row over	
1849	Leander Club	W. Bovill, M. Shearman, T. H. Fellows, E. C. Wolstenholme (st.), P. Colquhoun (cox)	ntt	E	Second Trinity Boat Club, Cambridge	
1850	Oxford University	J. J. Hornby, J. Aitken, C. H. Steward, J. W. Chitty (stroke), W. G. Rich (cox)		ro	Row over	
1851	Cambridge University	A. S. Page, W. S. Longmore, H. E. Tuckey, F. W. Johnson (stroke), C. H. Crosse (cox)	8:54	4l	Brasenose College, Oxford	
1852	Oxford University	R. Greenhall, H. R. Barker, P. H. Nind, W. O. Meade-King (stroke), F. Balguy (cox)	ntt	2-3l	Argonaut Club, London	
1853	Oxford University	K. Prescot, P. H. Nind, W. O. Meade-King, J. W. Chitty (stroke), G. Fetch (cox)	8:57	3-4l	Argonaut Club, London	
1854	Pembroke College, Oxford	G. O. Clarke, C. F. Cadiz, T. A. Hooper, H. R. Hayward (stroke), W. Fursdon (cox)	9:38		Lady Margaret Boat Club, Cm	
1855	Royal Chester Rowing Club	P. Maudsley, E. B. Gibson, E. Dixon, J. B. Littledale (stroke), H. Roberts (cox)		E	Lady Margaret Boat Club, Cm	
1856	Argonaut Club	J. Nottidge, A. A. Casamajor, J. Paine, H. H. Playford (stroke), F. Levien (cox)		ro	Royal Chester (withdrew)	
1857	London Rowing Club	A. A. Casamajor, J. Nottidge, J. Paine, H. H. Playford (stroke ), H. Weston (cox)	8:25	4l	Lady Margaret Boat Club, Cm	
1858	London Rowing Club	A. A. Casamajor, W Farrer, J. Paine, H. H. Playford (stroke ), H. Weston (cox)		ro	Row over	
1859	Third Trinity, Cambridge	R. Beaumont, H. H. Collings, J. P. Ingham, F. W. Holland (stroke), T. K. Gaskell (cox)	8:25	2ft	London Rowing Club	
1860	First Trinity, Cambridge	S. Heathcote, G. Cox, D. Ingles, N. Royds (stroke), J. T. Morland (cox)	9:26	E	London Rowing Club	
1861	First Trinity, Cambridge	H. S. Wright, W. C. Smyly, B. P. Gregson, G. H. Richards (stroke), J. C. Carter (cox)	9:35	2l	London Rowing Club	
1862	Brasenose College, Oxford	W. C. Harris, R. Shepherd, W. Champneys, W. B. Woodgate (stroke), C. J. Parkin (cox)	8:40	2l	Third Trinity, Cambridge	
1863	University College, Oxford	J. E. Parker, A. E. Seymour, F. H. Kelly, J. H. Forster (stroke), W. Glaister (cox)	8:24	1l	Brasenose College, Oxford	
1864	London Rowing Club	J. C. F. May, H. N. Custance, G. Ryan, F. Fenner (stroke), E. Weston (cox)	8:45	1 3/4l	University College, Oxford	
1865	Third Trinity, Cambridge	J. R. Selwyn, J. G. Chambers, R. A. Kinglake, W. R. Griffiths (stroke), F. Walton (cox)	8:13	2/3l	London Rowing Club	
1866	University College, Oxford	W. P. Bowman, W. W. Wood, A. Brassey, A. H. Hall (stroke), W. H. Lipscombe (cox)	9:28	4l	Kingston Rowing Club	
1867	University College, Oxford	W. P. Bowman, W. W. Wood, J. C. Tinne, A. H. Hall (stroke), W. H. Lipscombe (cox)	8:45	1l	Oxford Radleian	
1868	London Rowing Club	S. Le B. Smith, F. S. Gulston, A. De L. Long, W. Stout (stroke), V. Weston (cox)	8:22	4l	University College, Oxford	
1869	London Rowing Club	G. Ryan, F. S. Gulston, A. De L. Long, W. Stout (stroke), V. Weston (cox)	8:36	2l	Oxford Radleian	
1870	Oxford Etonian	R. W. B. Mirehouse, A. C. Yarborough, J. C. Tinne, W. D. Benson (stroke), E. E. Grubbe (cox)	8:05	2/3l	London Rowing Club	
1871	London Rowing Club	C. E. Routh, G. Ryan, A. De L. Long, F. S. Gulston (stroke), V. Weston (cox)	9:09	1l	Kingston Rowing Club	
1872	London Rowing Club	S. Le B. Smith, John B. Close, A. De L. Long, F. S. Gulston (stroke), V. Weston (cox)	9:21	sevl	Kingston Rowing Club	

=== 1873–1899 ===
Stewards' Challenge Cup – Coxless four
Year	Winner	Crew	Time	Dist	Runner-up	ref
1873	London Rowing Club	James B. Close, F. S. Gulston, A. DeL Long, John B. Close, (stroke)	8:23	3l	Kingston Rowing Club	
1874	London Rowing Club	S. Le B. Smith, F.L Playford, A. DeL Long, F. S. Gulston (stroke)	9:00	3l	Thames Rowing Club	
1875	London Rowing Club	S. Le B. Smith, F.L Playford, A. DeL Long, F. S. Gulston (stroke)	7:56	2 1/2l	Leander Club	
1876	London Rowing Club	C. H. Warren, F. S. Gulston, S. Le B. Smith, F.L Playford (stroke)	8:27	sev l	Thames Rowing Club	
1877	London Rowing Club	S. Le B. Smith, F. S. Gulston, A. DeL Long, F.L Playford (stroke)	9:7	2-3l	Thames Rowing Club	
1878	London Rowing Club	S. Le B. Smith, F. S. Gulston, A. Trower, F.L Playford (stroke)	8:37	p	Monroe, Shoe-wae-cae-mette BC, USA	
1879	Jesus College, Cambridge	G. M. Edmonds, C. Gurdon, T. E. Hockin, E. H. Prest (stroke)	9:37	2l	Lady Margaret Boat Club, Cambridge	
1880	Thames Rowing Club	W. H. Eyre, J. Hastie, D. E. Brown, F. Canton (stroke)	7:58	3l	Molesey Boat Club	
1881	Hertford College, Oxford	G. Q. Roberts, E. Buck, D. E. Brown, J. Lowndes (stroke)	8:15	p	Thames Rowing Club	
1882	Hertford College, Oxford	G. Q. Roberts, E. Buck, D. E. Brown, J. Lowndes (stroke)		E	Thames Rowing Club	
1883	Thames Rowing Club	H. B. Tween, J. Hastie, H. J. Rust, J. A. Drake-Smith (stroke)			London Rowing Club	
1884	Kingston Rowing Club	F. H. Cobb, H. A. Harvey, H. S. Till, R. H. Cobb (stroke)		disq	Twickenham Rowing Club	
1885	Trinity Hall, Cambridge	W. K. Hardacre, S. Swann, R. H. Coke, C. J. Bristowe (stroke)	7:53	p	Jesus College, Cambridge	
1886	Thames Rowing Club	B. W. Looker, A. S. Hutchinson, S. Fairbairn, J. A. Drake-Smith (stroke)	7:39	1l	Trinity Hall, Cambridge	
1887	Trinity Hall, Cambridge	R. McKenna, S. Swann, P. Landale, C. J. Bristowe (stroke)	7:53	E	Leander Club	
1888	Trinity Hall, Cambridge	F. H. Maugham, C. B. P. Bell, P. Landale, L Hannen (stroke)	8:25	St	Brasenose College, Oxford	
1889	Thames Rowing Club	C. W. Hughes, A. :Hutchinson, F. E. C. Clark, B. W. Looker (stroke)	7:53	E	Third Trinity, Cambridge	
1890	Brasenose College, Oxford	W. F. C. Holland, J. A. Ford, F. Wilkinson, C. W. Kent (stroke)	7:37	3/4l	Thames Rowing Club	
1891	Thames Rowing Club	B. W. Looker, P. Landale, F. E. C. Clark, J. C. Gardner (stroke)	7:45	1 1/4l	Trinity Hall, Cambridge	
1892	Royal Chester Rowing Club	S. G. Cox, A. Fairrie, R. E. R. Brockelbank, H. Fairrie (stroke)	8:38	1/4l	Thames Rowing Club	
1893	Magdalen College, Oxford	H. B. Cotton, W. S. Poole, V. Nickalls, G. Nickalls (stroke)	7:45	3/4l	Thames Rowing Club	
1894	Thames Rowing Club	G. H. McHenry, W. Broughton, S. D. Muttlebury, J. C. Gardner (stroke)	8:20	2 1/2l	New College, Oxford	
1895	London Rowing Club	A. S. Little, H. W. Stout, V. Nickalls, G. Nickalls (stroke)	7:43	1 1/4l	Thames Rowing Club	
1896	London Rowing Club	W. B. Richards, H. W. Stout, V. Nickalls, G. Nickalls (stroke)	8:42	1l	Thames Rowing Club	
1897	Leander Club	C. W N Graham, J. A. Ford, H. Willis, G. Nickalls (stroke)	7:30	2l	New College, Oxford	
1898	Leander Club	C. J, D, Goldie, H. Willis, C. D. Burnell, H. G. Gold (stroke)	7:42	1 1/4l	New College, Oxford	
1899	Magdalen College, Oxford	S. C. Thornhill, R. Carr, C. D. Burnell, H. G. Gold (stroke)	7:51	5l	Favorite Hammonia RC, Hamburg, GER	

=== 1900–1939 ===
Year	Winner	Crew	Time	Dist	Runner-up	ref
1900	Leander Club	R. O. Pitman, F. W. Warre, C. D. Burnell, J. E. Payne (stroke)	7:55	1 1/4l	Trinity College, Cambridge	
1901	Third Trinity, Cambridge	W. H. Watney, R. H. Nelson, W. Dudley Ward, C. W. H. Taylor (stroke)	7:54	E	Leander Club	
1902	Third Trinity, Cambridge	W. H. Chapman, P. H. Thomas, W. Dudley Ward, C. W. H. Taylor (stroke)	7:45	E	Leander Club	
1903	Third Trinity, Cambridge	W. H. Chapman, P. H. Thomas, W. Dudley Ward, R. H. Nelson (stroke)	8:5	1 3/4l	Royal Netherlands R&SC	
1904	Third Trinity, Cambridge	W. H. Chapman, C. W. H. Taylor, P. H. Thomas, R. H. Nelson (stroke)	7:30	1 1/2l	Winnipeg Rowing Club	
1905	Leander Club	H. A. Steward, R. B. Etherington-Smith, F. J. Escombe, G. Nickalls (stroke)	8:26	P	Third Trinity, Cambridge	
1906	Leander Club	A. K. Graham, F. S. Kelly, R. B. Etherington-Smith, G. Nickalls (stroke)	7:36	2ft	Third Trinity, Cambridge	
1907	Magdalen College, Oxford	R. P. Stanhope, E. H.L Southwell, A. G. Kirby, G. Nickalls (stroke)	8:42	3l	Leander Club	
1908	Magdalen College, Oxford	C.R. Cudmore, J.A. Gillan, D. Mackinnon, J.R. Somers-Smith (stroke)	7:40	1 1/2l	London Rowing Club	
1909	Thames Rowing Club	J. Beresford, K Vernon, C G Rought, B Logan (stroke)	7:38	1 1/2l	Magdalen College, Oxford	
1910	Winnipeg Rowing Club	F. F. Carruthers, C. E. Allen, G. B. Aldous, C. S. Riley (stroke)	7:52	E	Mainzer Ruder-Verein, Germany	
1911	Thames Rowing Club	J. Beresford, K. Vernon, C. G. Rought, B. Logan (stroke)	7:35	1 1/4l	Trinity Hall, Cambridge	
1912	New College, Oxford	F.A.H. Pitman, A.F.R. Wiggins, C.W.B Littlejohn, R.C. Bourne (stroke)	7:36	2 1/4l	Thames Rowing Club	
1913	New College, Oxford	F A H Pitman, A F R Wiggins, C W B Littlejohn, R C Bourne (stroke)	n/a	disq	Mainzer Ruder-Verein, GER	
1914	Leander Club	A. A. Swann, G. L. Thomson, C. E. V. Buxton, R C Bourne (stroke)	7:52	St	Mainzer Ruder-Verien, GER	
No races 1915–1919 (WWI)
1920	Magdalen College, Oxford	S. Earl, A.T.M. Durand, W.E.C.James, E.D.Horsfall, (stroke)	8:03	E	Thames Rowing Club	
1921	Magdalen College, Oxford	S. Earl, A.T.M. Durand, W.E.C. James, E.D. Horsfall (stroke)	7:32	3l	Leander Club	
1922	Eton Vikings Club	C.R.M. Eley, J.A. MacNabb, R.E. Morrison, T.R.B. Sanders	8:25	E	Grasshopper Club Zürich, SWI	
1923	Third Trinity, Cambridge	C.R.M. Eley, J.A. MacNabb, R.E. Morrison, T.R.B. Sanders	7:30	E	Magdalen College, Oxford	
1924	Third Trinity, Cm	C.R.M. Eley, J.A. MacNabb, R.E. Morrison, T.R.B. Sanders	8:37	3l	Leander Club	
1925	Third Trinity, Cm	R.E. Morrison, J.C. Armitage, H.R. Carver, E.C. Hamilton-Russell	7:27	2l	Leander Club	
1926	Thames Rowing Club	H.E. West, H.M. Lane, R. Teale , J.C. Badcock (stroke)	7:34	E	Leander Club	
1927	Thames Rowing Club	H.E. West, H.M. Lane, D.H.L. Gollan, J.C. Badcock (stroke)	8:01	2l	Leander Club	
1928	Thames Rowing Club	H.E. West, G.O. Nickalls, D.H.L. Gollan, J.C. Badcock (stroke)	7:43	2ft	London Rowing Club	
1929	First Trinity, Cambridge	E.V. Bevan, R. Beesly, M.H. Warriner, J.G.H Lander (stroke)	7:32	1l	London Rowing Club	
1930	London Rowing Club	F.M.L. Fitzwilliam, A.J. Harby, H.R.A. Edwards, H.C. Boardman (stroke)	7:34	1 1/2l	Leander Club	
1931	London Rowing Club	F.M.L. Fitzwilliam, A.J. Harby, H.R.A. Edwards, P.N. Carpmael (stroke)	8:45	3l	SCV Da Feltre Di Piacenza	
1932	Thames Rowing Club	J. Beresford, T.H. Tyler, R.D. George, J.C. Badcock (stroke)	8:09	2l	Berliner Ruder Club, GER	
1933	Pembroke College, Cm	D.H.E. McCowen, W.A.T. Sambell, J.H.T. Wilson, N.J. Bradley (stroke)	8:16	1 3/4l	London Rowing Club	
1934	Pembroke College, Cm	A.D. Kingsford, W.A.T. Sambell, J.H.T. Wilson, N.J. Bradley (stroke	7:24	ac	London Rowing Club	
1935	Zurich Rowing Club, SWI	H. Betschart, H. Homberger, A. Homberger, K Schmid (stroke)	7:14	3l	London Rowing Club	
1936	Zurich Rowing Club, SWI	H. Betschart, H. Homberger, A. Homberger, K. Schmid (stroke)	7:50	2l	Leander Club	
1937	Leander Club	P.H. Gaskell, J.M. Couchman, J.C. Cherry, J.D. Sturrock (stroke)	8:32	1l	Thames Rowing Club	
1938	Leander Club	J.H.T Wilson, J. Turnbull, J.C. Cherry, W.G.R.M. Laurie (stroke)	7:33	E	Trinity College, Oxford	
1939	Zurich Rowing Club, Switzerland	H. Betschart, E. Rufli, W. Schweizer, K. Schmid (stroke)	8:09	4l	Oriel College, Oxford	
No races 1940–1945 (WWII)

=== 1946–2000 ===
Year	Winner	Crew	Time	Dist	Runner-up	ref
1946	Leander Club	J.F. Burgess, R.M.A. Bourne, P. Bradley, N.J. Bradley (stroke)	7:48	2 1/2l	Oriel College, Oxford	
1947	Thames Rowing Club	J.A. Wilmot, J.P. Dizer, H.W. Rushmere, P.C. Kirkpatrick (stroke)	8:04	E	London Rowing Club	
1948	Thames Rowing Club	H.W. Rushmere, T.H Christie, A.S.F. Butcher, P.C. Kirkpatrick (stroke)	7:48	4l	Isis and Granta Clubs	
1949	Trinity College, Oxford	A.D. Rowe, C.G.V. Davidge	7:13	3l	London Rowing Club	
1950	Hellerup Roklubb, DEN	C.R. Nielsen, H.C.L. Nielsen, and P. Locht, K.B. Jensen	8:03	4l	Leander Club	
1951	Thames Rowing Club	P.C. Kirkpatrick, H.W. Rushmere, J.P. Dizer, A.J.R. Purssell	7:53	1 1/2l	Leander Club	
1952	Thames Rowing Club	Peter de Giles, G.C. Fisk, John Macmillan, P.M.O. Massey (stroke)	7:24	2l	London Rowing Club	
1953	Leander Club	David Macklin, Christopher Davidge, Billy Windham, R.M.S. Gubbins (stroke)	7:25	3/4l	First & Third Trinity BC, Cm	
1954	Club Krylia Sovetov, USSR		8:26	1 1/4l	Royal Air Force	
1955	Club Krylia Sovetov, USSR	V. Burachock, Y. Kuznetsov, F. Sukhov, Y. Sirotinsky (stroke)	7:40	3l	Leander Club	
1956	Thames Rowing Club	Maurice Legg, C.F. Porter, Alastair Davidson, J.M. Beresford (stroke)	8:06	3 1/2l	London Rowing Club	
1957	Club Krylia Sovetov, USSR	D. Smirnov, Y. Sorokin, V. Zakonnikov, P. Vajsberg (stroke)	7:35	E	London Rowing Club	
1958	Barn Cottage Boat Club	J.M. Beresford, S.C. Crosse, J.P. C. Viguro, C.F. Porter (stroke)	7:16	1/2l	National Provincial Bank RC	
1959	St Edmund Hall BC; Lincoln College, Ox		7:39	E	GS Moto Guzzi, ITA	
1960	Barn Cottage Boat Club	J.W. Tilbury, S.C. Crosse, K.R. Knight, J.M Russell (stroke)	7:10	4l	St Edmund Hall Boat Club; Lincoln College, Oxford	
1961	Trud Club, Leningrad, USSR	I. Akhremchik, V. Morkovkin, A. Tarabrin, Y. Bachurov (stroke)	7:23	2l	Thames Rowing Club	
1962	Trud Club, Leningrad, USSR		7:23	1 1/2l	Nereus Rowing Club	
1963	Molesey Boat Club	J.W. Tilbury, B. Gore, M.C. Clay, J.M. Russell (stroke)	7:16	2/3l	Thames Rowing Club	
1964	Tideway Scullers School	J.J. James, N.P. Cooper, R.N. Carpmael, J.M. Russell (stroke)	7:11	E	Leander Club	
1965	Quintin Boat Club	J.J. James, W.L. Barry, M.C. Clay, J.M Russell (stroke)	6:55	E	Nautilus Rowing Club	
1966	Roforeningen Kvik, DEN	J.O. Hansen, E. Petersen, K. Helmut, B. Hasler (stroke)	7:17	1l	Derby Rowing Club	
1967	SG Dynamo, Potsdam, GDR	D. Schulz, P. Schulz, H. Esslinger, J. Bergman (stroke)	7:31	2l	Nereus Rowing Club	
1968	Nautilus Rowing Club (Midlands)		8:53	4l	London Rowing Club	
1969	Nereus Rowing Club		7:06	E	Nottingham & Union Boat Club	
1970	SG Dynamo, Potsdam, GDR		7:22	3l	London Rowing Club	
1971	Thames Tradesmen's RC		7:12	1l	Cambridge Univ BC	
1972	Spartak, Moscow, USSR		n/a	disq	Univ of British Columbia, CAN	
1973	Univ of London BC		7:03	1/2l	Potomac Boat Club, USA	
1974	Dynamo Club, USSR		7:12	E	Leander Club; Tideway Scullers School	
1975	Potomac Boat Club, USA		6:50	2+1/3l	Lady Margaret BC, Cm	
1976	Univ of British Columbia, CAN		7:10s	1/3l	Thames Tradesmen's RC	
1977	London Rowing Club	Derek Bond, Ian McNuff, John Beattie, Martin Cross	7:24	n/a	row over	
1978	Trakia Club, Bulgaria		n/a	ro	London Rowing Club withdrew	
1979	London Rowing Club	John Beattie, Ian McNuff, David Townsend, Martin Cross	7:19	E	Oxford Univ BC	
1980	Charles River RA; Dartmouth College, USA	D. Sayner, B. Epke, J. Terwilliger, T. Hull (stroke)	7:04	2l	Avon Rowing Club; Petone Rowing Club, NZL	
1981	London Rowing Club; Thames Tradesmen's Rowing Club	J. Beattie, I. McNuff, J. Clark, M. Cross	7:48	E	Vesper Boat Club, USA	
1982	RC Schaffhausen; RC Thalwill, Switzerland		7:10	3 2/3l	Tyrian Boat Club	
1983	RC Schaffhauser; RC Thalwil, Switzerland		7:02	E	Cambridge University	
1984	NCRA; Tyne		6:57	cv	University of London; Tyrian Boat Club	
1985	Tyrian Boat Club		7:08	3l	Bagsvaerd Roklub, Denmark	
1986	Ridley Boat Club, Canada		6:41	1/2l	Tyrian Boat Club	
1987	Dinamo Moscow, USSR		6:40	1l	Tyrian Boat Club	
1988	Leander Club		6:44	E	Pennsylvania AC, USA	
1989	University of London; Oxford University	R. Obholzer, J. Walker, J. Searle, J. Hulls (stroke)	6:28	2/3l	Nautilus Rowing Club	
1990	Star Club; Leander Club 'A'		7:16	4 3/4l	Star Club; Leander Club	'B'
1991	Leander Club; Molesey Boat Club	J. Garrett, G. Stewart, J. Walker, G. Searle (stroke)	6:55	2l	Leander Club	
1992	NCRA		6:36	1l	Malmo Ruddklubb; Brudpiga Ruddklubb, Sweden	
1993	Leander Club; University of London		6:44	2/3l	RC Hansa Dortmund, Germany	
1994	EN Boulogne; AUN Lyon, France	M. Andrieux, D. Fauché, P. Lot, J-C. Rolland	6:44	1 1/2l	London Rowing Club	
1995	Cambridge University; CARC "Mladost"		6:31	2 1/4l	College Boat Club, Philadelphia, USA	
1996	NCRA; London Rowing Club		6:44	4l	Goldie Boat Club	
1997	Leander Club; Oxford University		6:47	2 1/2l	NCRA	
1998	Leander Club		6:41	3/4l	Danmarks Rocenter, Denmark	
1999	Leander Club; Queen's Tower		6:51	1l	Danmarks Rocenter, Denmark	

=== 2000 onwards ===
Year	Winner	Crew	Time	Dist	Runner-up	ref
2000	Leander Club		6:50	2/3l	Univ. Technology, Sydney, Haberfield RC, Australia	
2001	Leander Club; Queen's Tower		6:50	4l	George Rowing Center, Canada	
2002	Danmarks Rocenter, Denmark	H T Kristensen, S Madsen, T Ebert, E B Ebberson	7:01	1 1/4l	Gorge Rowing Center, Canada	
2003	Victoria City Rowing Club, Canada	C W Baerg, T A Herschmiller, J A Wetzel, B G Williams	6:33	2/3l	Gorge Rowing Center, Canada	
2004	Leander Club; Imperial College Boat Club	J Cracknell, S D Williams, E R Coode, M C Pinsent	6:46	3ls	Melbourne University; University of Queensland	
2005	Leander Club; Oxford University	S D Williams, P K Reed, A M Partridge, A Triggs Hodge	6:57	E	Victoria City Rowing Club, Canada	
2006	Hollandia Roeiclub, Holland		6:43	row over	row over	
2007	Leander Club; Molesey Boat Club		7:14	2 1/4l	Brentwood College; Shawnigan Lake, Canada	
2008	Cambridge University		7:09	3 1/2l	O.E.A. & N.A.V, Volos; N.C. Thessaloniki, Greece	
2009	Leander Club; Reading University Boat Club		7:05	3 1/2l	Waiariki R.C. New Zealand	
2010	Princeton Training Center, USA		7:09	3/4l	Club France, France	
2011	Leander Club; Molesey Boat Club		6:19	2 1/2l	Chula Vista Training Center, U.S.A.	
2012	National Rowing Centre of Excellence 'A', Australia	Owen Symington, Josh Hicks, Louis Snelson, Tim Masters	7:15	2/3l	Waiariki Rowing Club, New Zealand	
2013	Oxford Brookes University; University of London	Alan Sinclair, Nathaniel Reilly-O'Donnell, Scott Durant, Matthew Tarrant	6:27	1 1/4l	Tuks Rowing Club, South Africa	
2014	Molesey Boat Club; Leander Club	Andrew Triggs Hodge, George Nash, Moe Sbihi, Alex Gregory	6:41	3 1/2l	Club France 'B', France	
2015	Leander Club; University of London	Nathaniel Reilly-O'Donnell, Alan Sinclair, Tom Ransley, Scott Durant	6:49	2l	Nautical Club of Ioannina; Nautical Club of Kastoria, Greece	
2016	Hollandia Roeiclub	Harold Langen, Peter Van Schie, Vincent van der Want, Govert Viergever	6:53	1 3/4l	Erster Wiener Ruderclub 'LIA'; Ruderverein Villach, Austria	
2017	Molesey Boat Club; Leander Club	Matt Rossiter, Will Satch, Moe Sbihi, Matthew Tarrant	6:24	3/4l	Team Italia, Italy	
2018	Leander Club	Tom Ford, Jacob Dawson, Adam Neill, James Johnston	6:24	3/4l	Leander Club; Oxford University	
2019	Leander Club; Oxford Brookes University	Ollie Cook, Matt Rossiter, Rory Gibbs, Sholto Carnegie	6:38	2 1/2l	Leander Club	
2020	No competition due to COVID-19 pandemic					
2021	Oxford Brookes University	Sam Nunn, Sam Bannister, Oliver Wilkes, David Ambler	6:43	1 1/2l	Hollandia Roeiclub	
2022	Rowing Australia	Alexander Purnell, Spencer Turrin, Jack Hargreaves, Jack O'Brien	6:26	1ft	Oxford Brookes & Leander	
2023	Oxford Brookes University	Oliver Wilkes, Matt Aldridge, Freddie Davidson, David Ambler	7:07	E	Thames Rowing Club	
2024	Oxford Brookes University	Louis Nares, Thijs Ruiken, Fergus Woolnough, Jake Wincomb	6:50	2l	Leander Club	
2025	Croatian Rowing	Martin Sinković, Valent Sinković, Patrik Lončarić, Anton Lončarić	6:26	1½ l	Rowing Canada & Shawnigan Lake Sch	
2026	Leander Club	George Bourne, Douwe de Graaf, James Robson, Daniel Graham	6:22	2l	Nautilus Rowing Club	

Key

- ntt - no time taken
- l - Length/lengths
- e - easily
- + - a few sconds over 10 minutes
- sev - several
- ro -Row over
- Aw - Awarded
- p - paddled
- st - stopped
- ac - Alone (crab)
- cv = Canvas
