= Janoušek =

Janoušek (feminine: Janoušková) is a Czech surname. It is a diminutive form of the given name Jan. Notable people with the surname include:

- Anna Janoušková (born 1965), Czech cross-country skier
- Aťka Janoušková (1930–2019), Czech actress and singer
- Antonín Janoušek (1877–1941), Czech politician
- Bohumil Janoušek (born 1937), Czech rower
- Gabriel Janoušek (born 1940), Czech canoer
- Jiří Janoušek (born 1989), Czech footballer
- Karel Janoušek (1893–1971), Czechoslovak Air Force commander
- Miloš Janoušek (1952–2023), Slovak folk musician
- Roman Janoušek (born 1968), Czech lobbyist
- Roman Janoušek (born 1972), Czech footballer
- Václav Janoušek, Czech canoer
- Věra Janoušková (1922–2010), Czech sculptor, painter and graphic artist
- Vladimír Janoušek (1922–1986), Czech sculptor and painter
