= The Boat Race 1846 =

8th Boat Race
- Date: 3 April 1846
- Winner: Cambridge
- Margin of victory: 3 lengths
- Winning time: 21 minutes 5 seconds
- Overall record (Cambridge–Oxford): 6–2
- Umpire: C. J. Selwyn

The 8th Boat Race between crews from the University of Oxford and the University of Cambridge took place on the River Thames on 3 April 1846. Umpired by Charles Jasper Selwyn, Cambridge won in a time of 21 minutes 5 seconds, with a winning margin of three lengths. The race was held on the ebb tide, starting in Mortlake and ending in Putney. For the first time, outriggers were used by both crews.

== Background ==
The Championship Course along which the Boat Race is competed. For the 1846 event, the crews raced on the ebb tide, so started at Mortlake (marked as Finish) and ended in Putney (marked as Start).

The Boat Race is a side-by-side rowing competition between the University of Oxford (sometimes referred to as the "Dark Blues") and the University of Cambridge (sometimes referred to as the "Light Blues"). The race was first held in 1829, and since 1845 has taken place on the 4.2-mile (6.8 km) Championship Course on the River Thames in southwest London.

Following their ten-length defeat in the previous year's race, Oxford sent their challenge to Cambridge in February 1846, proposing that the race should take place at Easter. The umpire for the race was Charles Jasper Selwyn. Cambridge went into the race leading the contest overall, with five wins to Oxford's two since the inaugural race in 1829. On one of only a handful of occasions, the race was rowed on the ebb tide, from Mortlake to Putney.

For the first time in the history of the race, both boats used outriggers. Both crews had professional coaches: Oxford used John Noulton while Cambridge were trained by Robert Coombes, a champion sculler. It marked the start of the debate over the use of professional coaches which was not resolved until the 1852 race.

== Crews ==
The Cambridge crew weighed an average of 11 st 8.375 lb (73.5 kg), 3.25 pounds (1.5 kg) more per rower than their opponents. Oxford saw three Blues return from the 1845 race in Royds, Stapylton and Milman; Harkness and Hill returned for Cambridge.

Seat	Cambridge			Oxford		
Seat	Name	College	Weight	Name	College	Weight
Bow	George Francis Murdoch	Lady Margaret Boat Club	10 st 2 lb	H. S. Polehampton	Pembroke	10 st 9 lb
2	George Frederick Holroyd	1st Trinity	11 st 1 lb	E. C. Burton	Christ Church	11 st 0 lb
3	Stephen Thomas Clissold	3rd Trinity	12 st 0 lb	W. U. Heygate	Merton	11 st 8 lb
4	William Pickering Cloves	1st Trinity	12 st 12 lb	E. H. Penfold	St John's	11 st 8 lb
5	Edmond Wilder	Magdalene	13 st 2 lb	John W. Conant	St John's	12 st 4 lb
6	Robert Harkness (P)	Lady Margaret Boat Club	11 st 6 lb	F. C. Royds	Brasenose	11 st 9 lb
7	Ed. Parker Wolstenholme	1st Trinity	11 st 1 lb	W. C. Stapylton	Merton	10 st 12 lb
Stroke	Charles Gray Hill	2nd Trinity	11 st 1 lb	W. H. Milman (P)	Christ Church	11 st 0 lb
Cox	T. B Lloyd	Lady Margaret Boat Club	9 st 8 lb	C. J. Soanes	St John's	9 st 13 lb
Source: (P) – boat club president

== Race ==
At Hammersmith Bridge Cambridge had drawn half a boat's length ahead, but Oxford put on such a desperate spurt and came up as before. But this was their final effort; for pulling with unparalleled pluck and resolution, they had taken it all out of themselves.

— The Cambridge Book

Conditions for the race were described by MacMichael as "very fine, and the little wind there was with the tide." The race commenced shortly after 11.10 a.m., started by Edward Searle. Oxford won the toss and elected to start from the Surrey station, handing Cambridge the Middlesex side of the river. Despite taking an early lead, Oxford were soon caught and Cambridge drew away, holding a third-of-a-length lead by Chiswick. As the long bend began to favour Oxford, Cambridge slowed in shallow water allowing the Dark Blues to close some of the discrepancy, but by Hammersmith Bridge, Cambridge were back to a half-length lead. A final surge from Oxford once again closed the gap, but Cambridge pulled away to take the victory in a record time of 21 minutes 5 seconds and by a margin of three lengths.
