= Andrew David Lobbenberg =

British rower

Personal information
- Born: Andrew David Lobbenberg; April→June 1966 (age 59–60) Shrewsbury, Shropshire, England
- Education: Balliol College, Oxford

Sport
- Country: Great Britain
- Sport: Rowing
Medal record
The Boat Race
Gold medal – first place	The Boat Race 1987	Oxford
Gold medal – first place	The Boat Race 1988	Oxford

Andrew David Lobbenberg (born April→June 1966 in Shrewsbury), an alumnus of Balliol College, Oxford is a former British rower. He was the cox for the winning Oxford team in the Boat Races of 1987 and 1988.
