= Jim Walker (rower) =

British rower

Jim Walker OLY
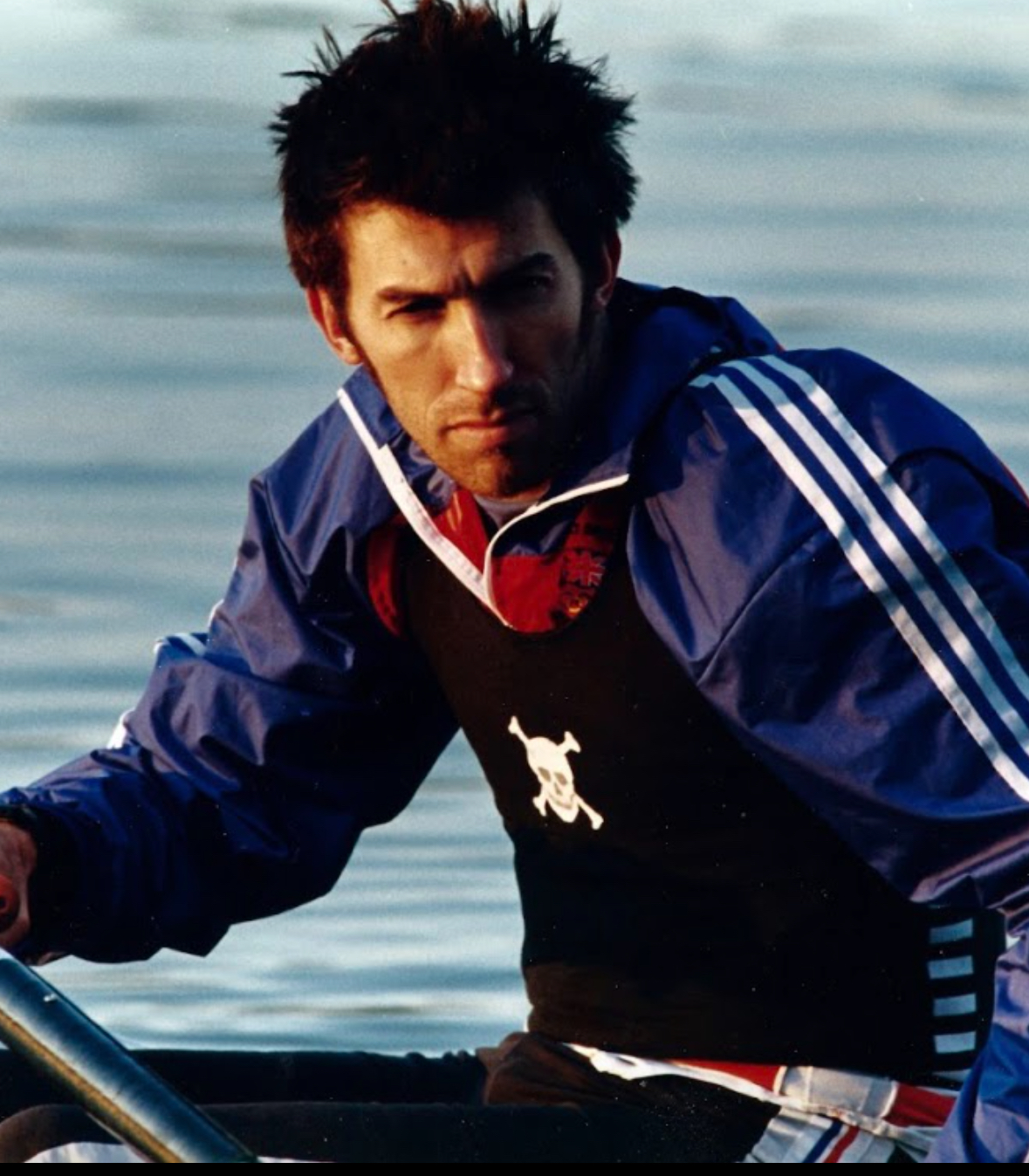
- Jim Walker training on the River Thames, Hammersmith (November 1996)

Personal information
- Full name: James David Campbell Walker
- Nationality: British
- Born: 25 August 1968 (age 57) Chester, England
- Education: King's School, Chester; Imperial College London (BSc) Imperial College Centre for Environmental Technology (MSc)

Sport
- Sport: Rowing
- Club: Molesey Boat Club; Leander Club; University of London Boat Club; Imperial College Boat Club
- Coached by: Sean Bowden; Marty Aitken; Jürgen Gröbler; Harry Mahon; Bill Mason
Medal record
Men's rowing
Representing Great Britain
World Rowing Championships
Bronze medal – third place	1989 Bled	Eight
Lucerne International Regatta
Gold medal – first place	1990 Rotsee	Eight
San Diego Crew Classic
Gold medal – first place	1990 San Diego	Elite Eight
World Junior Rowing Championships
Silver medal – second place	1986 Račice	Coxless Four

== Biography ==
James David Campbell Walker (born 25 August 1968) is a British former Olympic oarsman and subsequently clean energy developer from Chester. He was active in international rowing between 1985 and 2000.

== Rowing career ==
Walker won a bronze medal in the Men's Eight event at the 1989 World Rowing Championships and competed in the same boat class at the 1992 Olympic Games in Barcelona and the 1996 Olympic Games in Atlanta.

He competed for Great Britain at two Junior World Championships (1985 and 1986), the 1987 Under-23 World Championships, the 1987 World Student Games, six World Championships from 1989 to 1995, and two Goodwill Games in 1990 and 1994. He was a world junior silver medalist in 1986, competing in a British four with Matt Brittin, Jonny Searle and Mark Pierce.

During his rowing career he competed for clubs including King's Chester, Imperial College, University of London, Leander Club and Molesey Boat Club.

He is a four-time winner at Henley Royal Regatta, including the Stewards' Challenge Cup in 1989 and 1991, the Prince Philip in 1993 and the Visitors' in 1987. His 1989 winning time of 6.28 made his ULBC/OUBC crew with Jonny Searle, Rupert Obholzer and Jonny Hulls the first four to finish under six and a half minutes, breaking the previous Stewards' record by 12 seconds.

As part of the debate following the Atlanta Olympics about the then chronic lack of funding for elite sport in Britain, Walker was identified by the Guardian newspaper as one of five examples of unfunded Team GB athletes deserving of National Lottery support for the 1996-2000 Olympic cycle, alongside sailor Sir Ben Ainslie, swimmer Paul Palmer, sprinter Angie Thorp and canoeist Lynn Simpson.

He was a member of the British sculling squad in 1998, was a reserve for the 1999 World Championships sweep team and also a final trialist for the British team for the 2000 Olympics, where he was ultimately unsuccessful in securing selection for a third Games in Sydney.

== Sustainability career ==
After the 1996 Olympics Walker returned to Imperial College to study Environmental Technology, working subsequently for six years in consultancy, the first three of which he combined with seeking selection for the Sydney Olympic Games. He retired from rowing in 2000.

"I love how The Climate Group started, with co-founders Jim Walker and Steve Howard going from working on a borrowed laptop in an office rented using a credit card, to bringing together leaders from around the world to combat climate change" — Sir Richard Branson, Low carbon innovation and leadership, Virgin Group blog, 2014

Together with Dr. Steve Howard and Alison Lucas, Walker co-founded the international organization The Climate Group in 2004, serving for 10 years as COO in London, Beijing and the United States. In 2014 he worked as founding CEO to help establish the We Mean Business coalition, a campaign that worked with major companies on the United Nations Paris Agreement on climate.

From 2007 to 2017 he was a final jury member for the annual Dutch Postcode Lottery Green Challenge, one of the world’s biggest sustainability competitions by prize value. Until 2023 he led partnerships and fundraising efforts for the United Nations-affiliated initiative SEforALL, reporting to two successive Special Representatives of the UN Secretary-General.

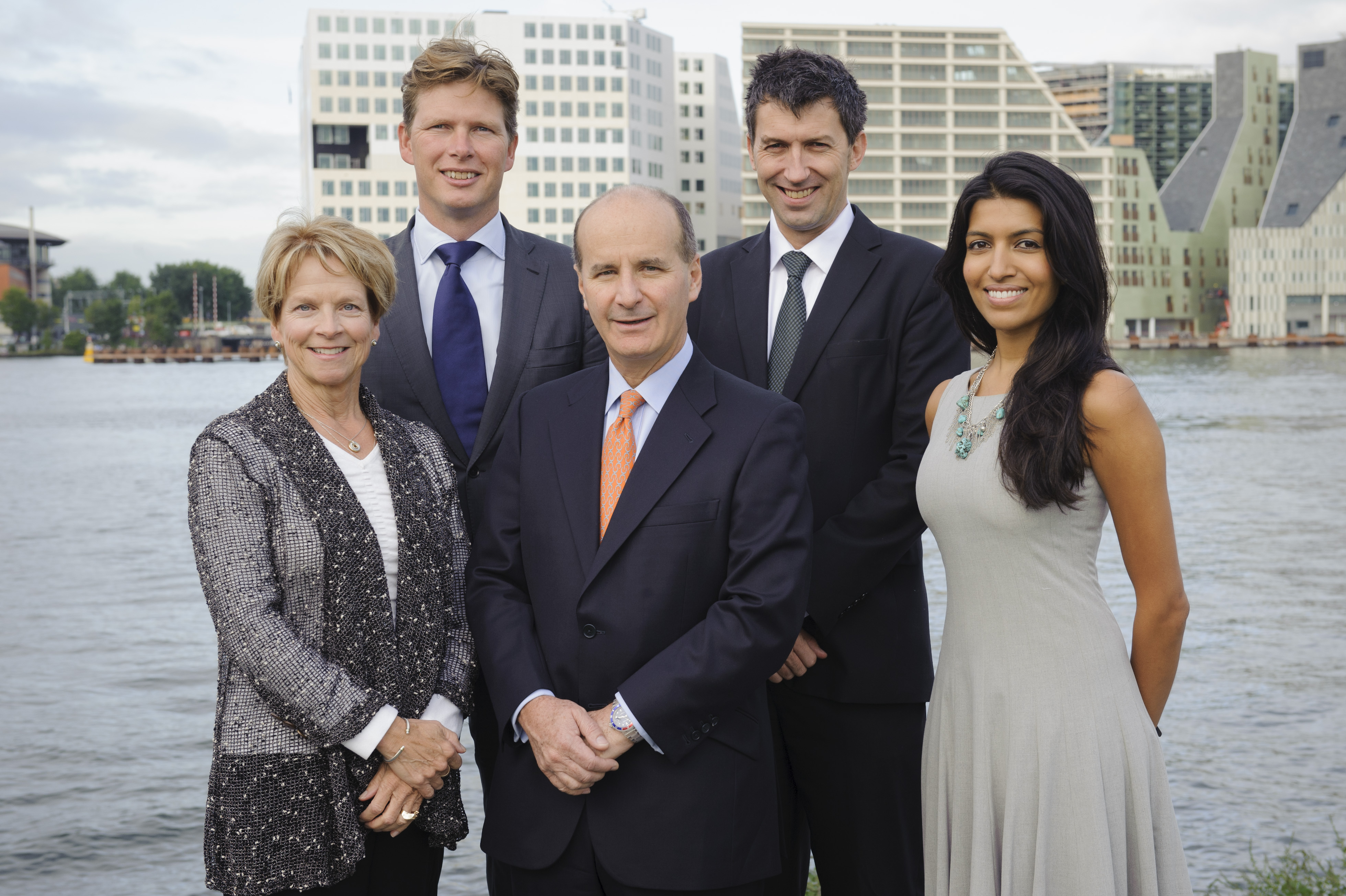
Walker (second from right) with fellow judges Marty Pickett, Coen van Oostrom, former President of Costa Rica José María Figueres and Leila Janah. Postcode Lottery Green Challenge, Amsterdam, September 2012.

== Rowing results ==
Year	Event	Venue	Boat class	Result
1985	Junior World Championships	Brandenburg, East Germany	2-	8th
1986	Junior World Championships	Roudnice/Racice, Czechoslovakia	4-	Silver
1987	Under-23 World Championships	Aiguebelette, France	4-	5th
1989	World Championships	Bled, Yugoslavia	8o	Bronze
1990	San Diego Crew Classic	San Diego, USA	8o	Gold
1990	Lucerne International Regatta	Lucerne, Switzerland	8o	Gold
1990	Goodwill Games	Seattle, USA	8o, 4+	-
1990	World Championships	Lake Barrington, Tasmania, Australia	8o	4th
1991	Grunau International Regatta	Grunau, Berlin, Germany	4-	Gold
1991	World Championships	Vienna, Austria	4-	7th
1992	Olympic Games	Barcelona, Spain	8o	6th
1993	World Championships	Roudnice/Racice, Czech Republic	8o	6th
1994	Goodwill Games	Saint Petersburg, Russia	8o	-
1994	World Championships	Indianapolis, USA	8o	8th
1995	World Championships	Tampere, Finland	8o	6th
1996	Olympic Games	Atlanta, USA	8o	8th
1999	World Championships	St. Catherine’s, Canada	Reserve	n/a
