= Aťka Janoušková =

Czech actress, voice actress and singer (1930–2019)

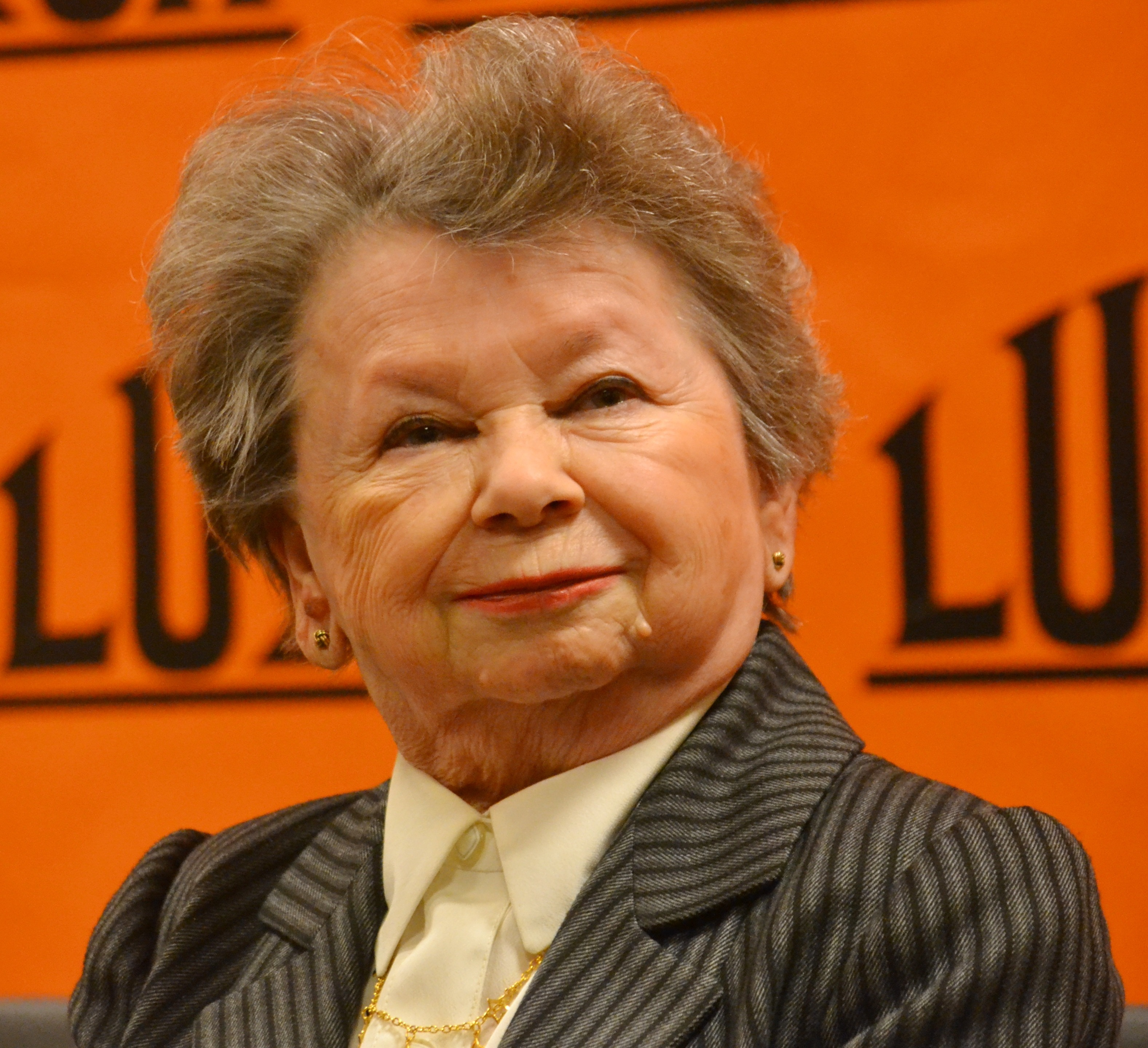
- Janoušková in 2015
- Born: Vlasta Janoušková; 16 March 1930; Prague, Czechoslovakia
- Died: 7 March 2019 (aged 88); Prague, Czech Republic
- Occupations: Actress, voice actress

Aťka Janoušková (16 March 1930 – 7 March 2019) was a Czech actress, voice actress and singer. With a height of only 120 cm (3.9 ft) and childlike voice, she was often cast in specific roles.

== Life ==
She was born Vlasta Janoušková on 16 March 1930 in Prague to Rudolf Janoušek, a jeweller. Her father nicknamed her Aťka, which she adopted as her name. She was enthused by ballet and acting. While she was a grammar school student, her parents were sent to a concentration camp and only her mother returned. During World War II, she performed at the National Theatre from the age of eleven and then she joined Disman's radio ensemble. Her mother, Hedvika Janoušková, married again after the war and Aťka was happy that she had gained two new siblings.

As an adult, Janoušková measured only 120 cm (3.9 ft). She underwent hormone treatment during her childhood, but with minimal success. After World War II, Janoušková finished high school and learned English, French, German and a little Russian. In 1950, she became employed as a clerk, but at the same time that year she joined the E. F. Burian Theatre, where she acted in several performances. Due to her small stature, she mainly played supporting roles. In 1956, she decided to leave the theatre and become a singer. After a three-year engagement in the orchestra, she sang in various bars and travelled with music bands. In 1968, her partner, drummer Josef Poslední, tragically died.

After the Prague Spring ended in 1968, Janoušková was engaged in Jiří Sladký's orchestra. From 1981 to 1989, she performed at the National Theatre in the role of Barbora in the opera Zuzana Vojířová. She also played the role in the TV film version of Zuzana Vojířová. From 1989, she played at the Rokoko Theatre.

In 2009, after fifty years of voice acting, Janoušková received the František Filipovský Award for her lifetime achievement in voice acting. She was especially known for her work dubbing animated films for children. Among her most famous dubbing roles was the voice of Maya the Bee. Her unusual voice was also often used in TV commercials.

Janoušková died in her apartment in the Strašnice district of Prague on 7 March 2019, shortly before her 89th birthday.

== Selected filmography ==
- Deváté jméno (1964)
- Long Live Ghosts! (voice; 1977)
- Proč nevěřit na zázraky (voice; 1978)
- Hodinářova svatební cesta korálovým mořem (1979)
- Zuzana Vojířová (1983)
- Amadeus (1984)
