= The Boat Race 1989 =

135th Boat Race
- Date: 25 March 1989
- Winner: Oxford
- Margin of victory: 2 1/2 lengths
- Winning time: 18 minutes 27 seconds
- Overall record (Cambridge–Oxford): 69–65
- Umpire: Ronnie Howard (Oxford)

Other races
- Reserve winner: Isis
- Women's winner: Cambridge

The 135th Boat Race took place on 25 March 1989. Held annually, the Boat Race is a side-by-side rowing race between crews from the Universities of Oxford and Cambridge along the River Thames. Oxford won by 2 1/2 lengths. It was the seventh occasion that the race was umpired by Ronnie Howard, and the first time in the history of the race that both crews were coxed by women.

In the reserve race, Oxford's Isis won, while Cambridge won the Women's Boat Race.

== Background ==
The Boat Race is a side-by-side rowing competition between the University of Oxford (sometimes referred to as the "Dark Blues") and the University of Cambridge (sometimes referred to as the "Light Blues"). First held in 1829, the race currently takes place on the 4.2-mile (6.8 km) Championship Course on the River Thames in southwest London. The rivalry is a major point of honour between the two universities, followed throughout the United Kingdom and broadcast worldwide. Oxford went into the race as reigning champions, having won the 1988 race by 5 1/2 lengths, with Cambridge leading overall with 69 victories to Oxford's 64 (excluding the "dead heat" of 1877). The event was sponsored by Beefeater Gin; prior to the race, it was announced that the company would be sponsors for the following three years in a deal worth £700,000. Former Oxford Blue Ronnie Howard was the umpire for the race for the seventh occasion.

Cambridge were coxed by Leigh Weiss while Oxford's cox was Alison Norrish – it was the first time in the history of the Boat Race that both crews had female coxes. Prior to the race, Oxford coach Pat Sweeney criticised Weiss: "Their cox is so useless she might hit us. It's not her fault, but Cambridge should have chosen someone who knows the river." Weiss responded "I feel confident that I will make the decisions to make Cambridge win."

The first Women's Boat Race took place in 1927, but did not become an annual fixture until the 1960s. Until 2014, the contest was conducted as part of the Henley Boat Races, but as of the 2015 race, it is held on the River Thames, on the same day as the men's main and reserve races. The reserve race, contested between Oxford's Isis boat and Cambridge's Goldie boat has been held since 1965. It usually takes place on the Tideway, prior to the main Boat Race.

== Crews ==
Cambridge were pre-race favourites, as their crew weighed an average of almost 12 pounds (5.4 kg) per rower more than their opponents, the largest difference since the first Boat Race. Cambridge's Toby Backhouse weighed in at 16 st 11 lb (106.3 kg) making him the heaviest rower in the history of the event. The Oxford boat featured three former Blues while Cambridge's contained five. Cambridge's chief coach was Mike Lees while Oxford University Boat Club selected Sweeney as coach, and Steve Royle to be their full-time director.

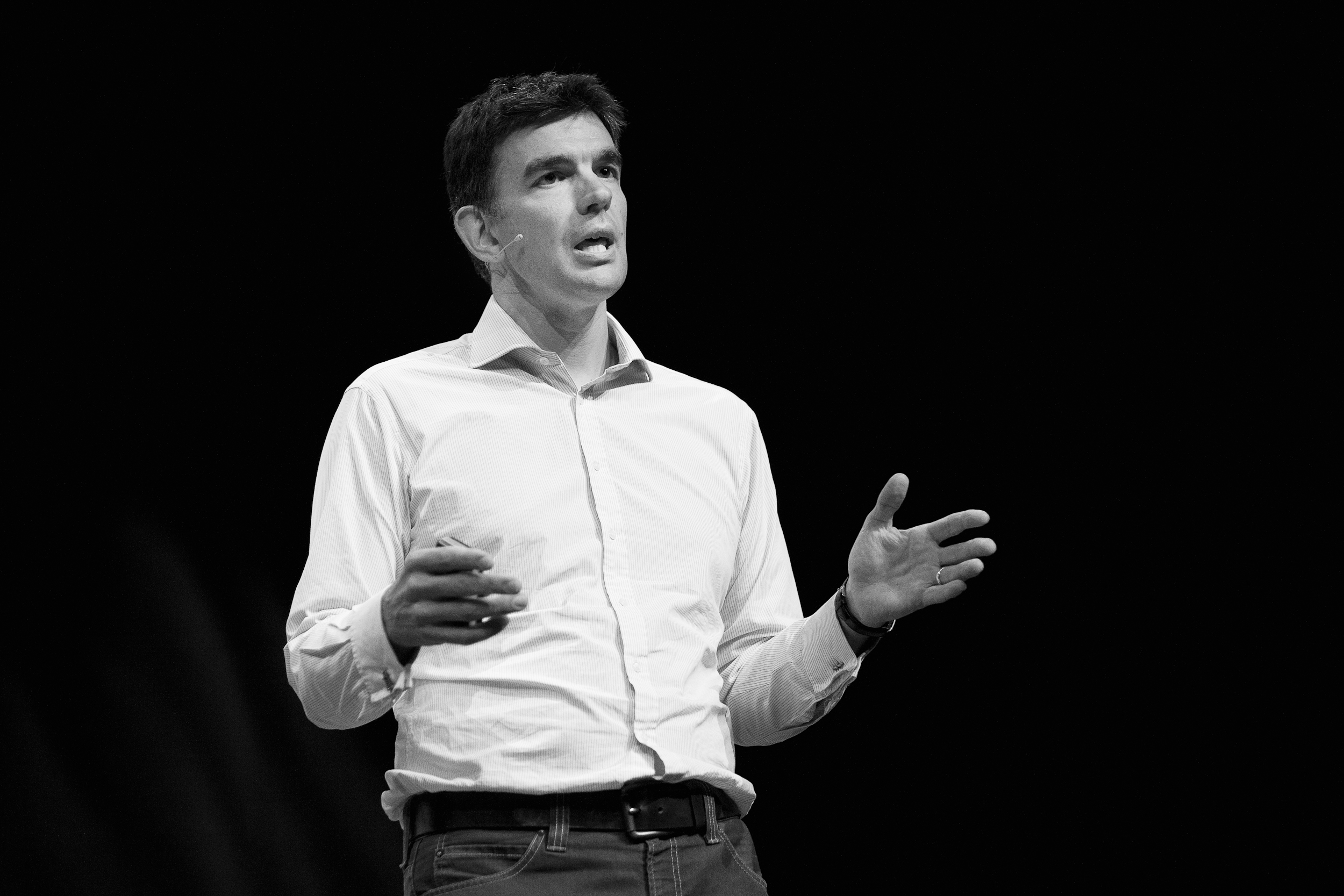
Matt Brittin (pictured in 2012) rowed at number 4 for Cambridge.

Seat	Oxford			Cambridge		
Seat	Name	College	Weight	Name	College	Weight
Bow	Guy Blanchard	Oriel	13 st 8 lb	Ian Clarke	Fitzwilliam	13 st 4 lb
2	Paul Gleeson	Hertford	15 st 0 lb	M J K Smith	Magdalene	14 st 12 lb
3	G Cheveley	Pembroke	13 st 3 lb	Paddy Mant	Selwyn	15 st 3 lb
4	Cal Maclennan	Keble	13 st 7 lb	Matthew Brittin (P)	Robinson	14 st 12 lb
5	Terry Dillon	Oriel	14 st 12 lb	Toby Backhouse	Magdalene	16 st 11 lb
6	Mike Gaffney	Hertford	14 st 9 lb	Nick Justicz	Sidney Sussex	14 st 8 lb
7	Jonny Searle	Christ Church	13 st 8 lb	Jim Garman	St John's	14 st 11 lb
Stroke	Richard Thorp	St John's	13 st 2 lb	Guy Pooley	St John's	13 st 6 lb
Cox	Alison Norrish	University	7 st 13 lb	Leigh Weiss	Emmanuel	7 st 6 lb
Source: (P) – boat club president

== Races ==
The Championship Course along which the Boat Race is contested

Cambridge won the toss and elected to start from the Surrey station. After an early clash of blades, Oxford crept ahead and held a lead of three seconds by the Mile Post. Two minutes later Oxford had a clear water advantage and continued to pull away, holding a six-second lead at Hammersmith Bridge. The lead had extended slightly by the Chiswick Steps; Cambridge failed to make any ground on Oxford who swept under Barnes Bridge eight seconds ahead. Oxford maintained the lead to pass the finish post 2 1/2 lengths clear.

In the reserve race, Oxford's Isis won by 1 1/4 lengths, their first victory in three years. while Cambridge won the 44th Women's Boat Race by one length in a time of 6 minutes and 20 seconds, their second victory in three years.

== Reaction ==
Umpire Ronnie Howard said "It was a damaging race, and I was looking for possible breakages". Oxford's stroke Richard Thorp explained "We expect it [clashing] but Ali [Norrish] has so much more experience of the Tideway". Former Oxford coach Dan Topolski suggested that "the race is a battle of guts and willpower, and Cambridge settled to a steady rhythm too soon."
