= Julius Beresford =

British rower

Personal information
- Nicknames: Berry, The Old Berry
- Born: Julius Bernard Wiszniewski; 18 July 1868
- Died: 29 September 1959 (aged 91)

Sport
- Sport: Rowing
Medal record
Representing United Kingdom
Olympic Games
Silver medal – second place	1912 Stockholm	Coxed Four

Julius Beresford (Wiszniewski) (18 July 1868 – 29 September 1959), also known as Berry or The Old Berry, was a British rower and coach. Beresford competed at the 1912 Summer Olympics in Stockholm, Sweden.

== Life ==
Beresford was the son of Julius Bernard Wiszniewski, an emigrant from Danzig and his wife Stella Louisa Davey. In 1871, the family was living in Tottenham. Julius Beresford dropped his father's surname "Wiszniewski" in 1914. Outside rowing, he was a partner in a furniture-making business, Beresford & Hicks.

Beresford initially sculled at Kensington Rowing Club in Hammersmith with some success, winning many trophies although failing in attempts at the Wingfield Sculls in 1902 and 1903 and in the London Cup at the Metropolitan Regatta. By 1904, he had decided that he had reached his limits as a single sculler and moved to Thames Rowing Club in order to row seriously in crew boats. He remained a member of Thames for the rest of his life. In 1909 and 1911, he was in the crew that won the Stewards Challenge Cup at Henley Royal Regatta. Also, in the 1911 regatta, he partnered Arthur Cloutte to win the Silver Goblets & Nickalls' Challenge Cup. In a heat of this event he and Cloutte dead heated against Bruce Logan and Charles Rought to set a course record which lasted until 1934. Rought and Logan joined Beresford who was the bowman, in the Thames Rowing Club coxed four which won the silver medal for Great Britain rowing at the 1912 Summer Olympics.

Beresford served as captain of Thames Rowing Club in 1914 and again in 1926. In 1922, he was appointed as vice president of the club. He was a dedicated coach with strong opinions. Despite holding similar views on techniques, Beresford clashed with Steve Fairbairn, and a dispute between the two was an underlying cause of Fairbairn's move from Thames to London Rowing Club in 1927.

As a coach at Thames, Beresford's greatest successes came in 1927 when Thames won four events at Henley Royal Regatta and in 1928 when the club repeated the feat.

Beresford's son Jack Beresford was also a rower and won medals at five successive Olympics. His grandson Michael Beresford also became an Olympic rower.

== Achievements ==
=== Olympic Games ===
- 1912 – Silver, Coxed Four

=== Henley Royal Regatta ===
- 1909 – Stewards' Challenge Cup
- 1911 – Stewards' Challenge Cup
- 1911 – Silver Goblets & Nickalls' Challenge Cup
- 1919 Victory Regatta – Fawley Cup
