= Filippi =

Filippi is an Italian surname. Notable people with the surname include:

- Alana Filippi (1960 or 1961 – 2020), French singer and songwriter
- Alessia Filippi (born 1987), Italian swimmer
- Amnon Filippi (born 1969), American poker player
- Ange-Marie Filippi-Codaccioni (1925–2018), French historian and Communist politician
- Bruno Filippi (1900–1919), Italian anarchist and writer
- Camilla Filippi (born 1979), Italian actress
- Camillo Filippi (died 1574), Italian painter
- Ernesto Filippi (born 1950), Uruguayan football referee
- Gloria Filippi (born 1992), Italian archer
- Joe Filippi (born 1953), Scottish footballer
- John Filippi (born 1995), French racing driver
- Luca Filippi (born 1985), Italian racing driver
- Lucienne Filippi (1928–2023), French painter
- Mattia Filippi (born 1993), Italian footballer
- Roberto Filippi (born 1948), Italian footballer
- Rodéric Filippi (born 1989), French footballer
- Sebastiano Filippi (c.1536–1602), Italian painter
- Tomáš Filippi (born 1992), Czech ice hockey player

== See also ==
- Filippi Boats, Italian rowing equipment manufacturer
- Philippi (disambiguation)
