= The Boat Race 1988 =

134th Boat Race
- Date: 2 April 1988
- Winner: Oxford
- Margin of victory: 5 1/2 lengths
- Winning time: 18 minutes 27 seconds
- Overall record (Cambridge–Oxford): 69–64
- Umpire: Mike Sweeney (Cambridge)

Other races
- Reserve winner: Goldie
- Women's winner: Oxford

The 134th Boat Race took place on 2 April 1988. Held annually, the event is a side-by-side rowing race between crews from the Universities of Oxford and Cambridge along the River Thames. Oxford won by 5 1/2 lengths in a time of 18 minutes 27 seconds, the equal-fourth fastest time in the event's history. The race was umpired by former Cambridge rowing Blue Mike Sweeney.

In the reserve race, Cambridge's Goldie won, while Oxford won the Women's Boat Race.

== Background ==
The Boat Race is a side-by-side rowing competition between the University of Oxford (sometimes referred to as the "Dark Blues") and the University of Cambridge (sometimes referred to as the "Light Blues"). First held in 1829, the race takes place on the 4.2-mile (6.8 km) Championship Course on the River Thames in southwest London. The rivalry is a major point of honour between the two universities and followed throughout the United Kingdom and broadcast worldwide. Oxford went into the race as reigning champions, having won the 1987 race by four lengths, with Cambridge leading overall with 69 victories to Oxford's 64 (excluding the "dead heat" of 1877). The event was sponsored by Beefeater Gin and was televised in the United Kingdom by the BBC on its Grandstand sports programme.

The first Women's Boat Race took place in 1927, but did not become an annual fixture until the 1960s. Until 2014, the contest was conducted as part of the Henley Boat Races, but as of the 2015 race, it is held on the River Thames, on the same day as the men's main and reserve races. The reserve race, contested between Oxford's Isis boat and Cambridge's Goldie boat has been held since 1965. It usually takes place on the Tideway, prior to the main Boat Race.

== Crews ==
Oxford weighed in with the heaviest crew in Boat Race history – on average the rowers weighed 14 st 11.5 lb (93.9 kg), 11 lb more per man than Cambridge. Oxford's Gavin Stewart, at 6 ft 8.5 in (2.04 m) was the tallest rower in the history of the Boat Race. Cambridge's crew included four former Blues while Oxford's featured six. Oxford's coaching team included Canadian international coach Mike Spracklen.

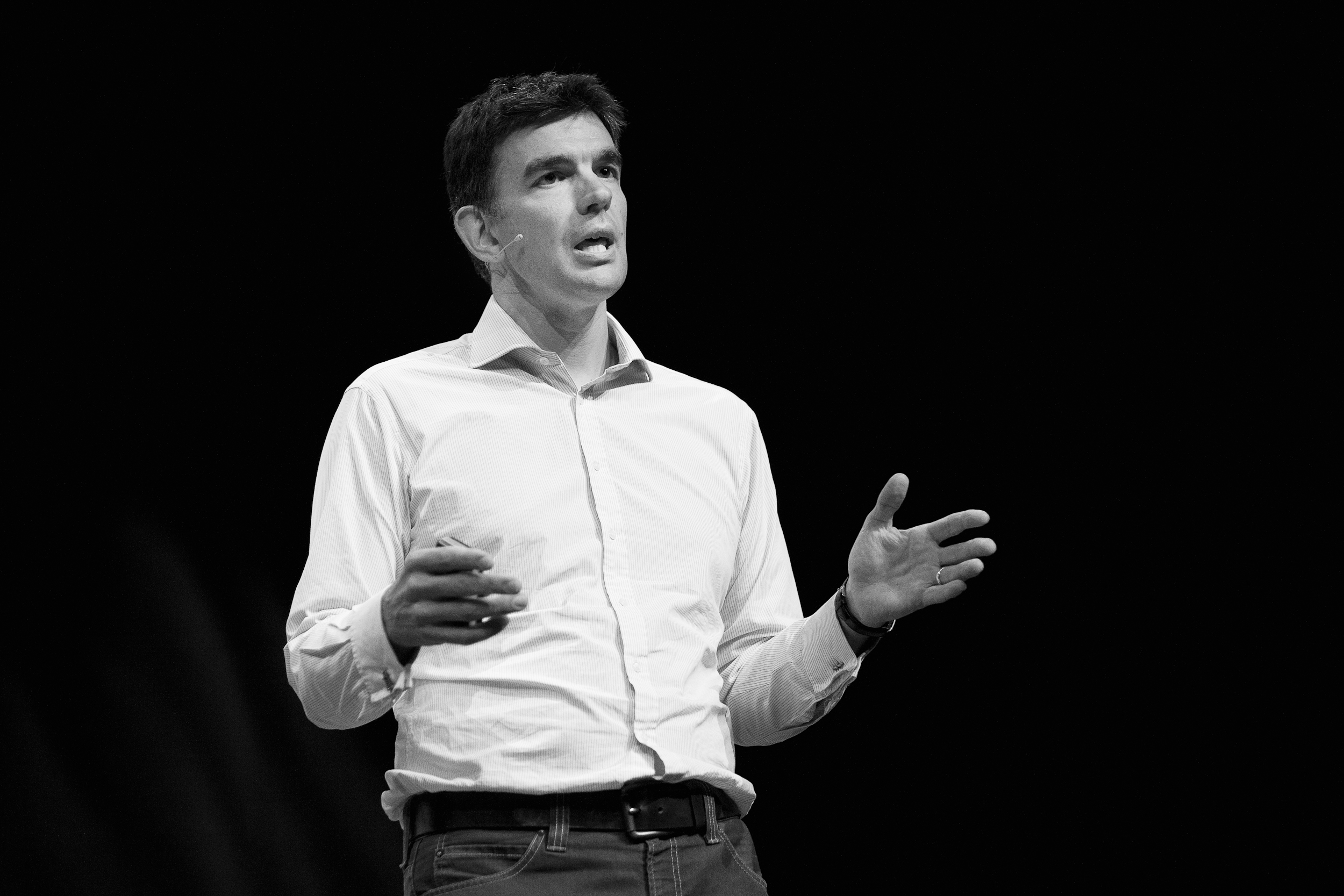
Matt Brittin (pictured in 2012) rowed at stroke for Cambridge.

Seat	Oxford			Cambridge		
Seat	Name	College	Weight	Name	College	Weight
Bow	Hugh Pelham	Christ Church	13 st 7.5 lb	R S N Ames	Trinity	14 st 0.5 lb
2	Paul Gleeson	Hertford	15 st 1 lb	M J K Smith	Magdalene	14 st 8 lb
3	Richard Hull	Oriel	14 st 7.5 lb	J C T Pepperell	Sidney Sussex	15 st 2 lb
4	Chris G Penny (P)	St John's	15 st 13.5 lb	R A B Spink	Downing	13 st 12 lb
5	Tom A D Cadoux-Hudson	New College	14 st 6 lb	Jim R Garman (P)	Lady Margaret Boat Club	14 st 6 lb
6	Gavin B Stewart	Wadham	16 st 4 lb	Guy Pooley	Lady Margaret Boat Club	13 st 7.5 lb
7	Jonny Searle	Christ Church	13 st 13 lb	Nicholas J Grundy	Jesus	12 st 2.5 lb
Stroke	Michael Gaffney	Hertford	14 st 13 lb	Matthew J Brittin	Robinson	14 st 7 lb
Cox	Andy D. Lobbenberg	Balliol	8 st 5 lb	S J Loveridge	Trinity	8 st 11.5 lb
Sources: (P) – boat club president

== Race ==
The Championship Course along which the Boat Race is contested

The race took place on 2 April 1988. Oxford started as pre-race favourites, and having won the toss, elected to start from the Surrey station. Immediately from the start, the umpire was called into action, warning both coxes for steering too closely to one another. Cambridge took a slight lead but Oxford soon recovered to become level, and by the Mile Post were three seconds ahead. Shortly after, the Cambridge number 7, Nick Grundy caught a crab, causing his boat to "shudder to a halt." Oxford slowly extended their lead; nine seconds ahead at Hammersmith Bridge, eleven seconds by the Chiswick Steps and fifteen by Barnes Bridge. Oxford passed the finishing post 16 seconds ahead of Cambridge, winning by 5 1/2 lengths in a time of 18 minutes 27 seconds, the equal-fourth fastest time in the event's history.

In the reserve race, Cambridge's Goldie won by 5 1/2 lengths in a time of 17 minutes and 55 seconds, their second consecutive victory. Oxford won the 43rd Women's Boat Race with their third victory in four years.

== Reaction ==
The Beefeater Gin Trophy was presented by Denis Thatcher. Grundy said of his crab: "I feathered my oar after a stroke and the tip caught the water, which plunged it back in." Oxford Boat Club president Chris Penny said "It was not an easy race but it was enjoyable. We kept our heads, found our rhythm and moved back and through them."
