= Arthur Cloutte =

English rower

Arthur Hamilton Cloutte (born 1871) was an English rower who won the Wingfield Sculls, the amateur single sculling championship of the River Thames, in 1902.

Cloutte was born in Turnham Green in west London, the son of Arthur Cloutte and his wife Jane. His father was in 1881 headmaster of Hele's School, Plympton St Maurice, Devon, where Cloutte received his early education. Cloutte joined London Rowing Club and competed in the Wingfield Sculls over several years winning in 1902. In 1901 Cloutte lost to Harry Blackstaffe, but in 1902 won the race on the line. He lost to F S Kelly in 1903, to Saint-George Ashe in 1904 and to Harry Blackstaffe in 1905 and 1906. In 1905 he was runner up to L F Scholes in the Diamond Challenge Sculls.

Cloutte was a banker, and was employed by Barings Bank. However, in 1913 he stole money from his employers and was sentenced to six months hard labour.
