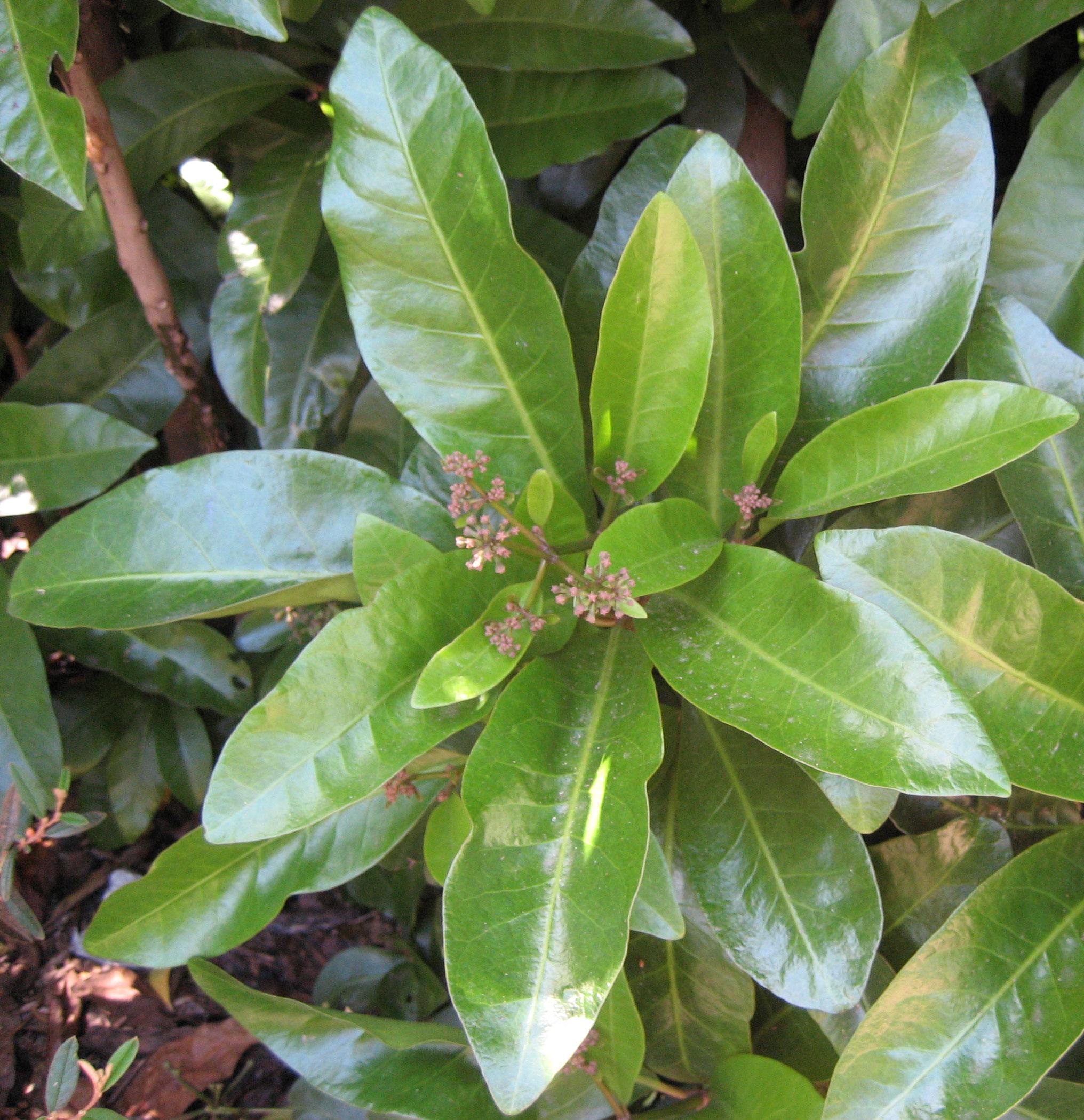
- Pisonia brunoniana

Scientific classification
- Kingdom: Plantae
- Clade: Tracheophytes
- Clade: Angiosperms
- Clade: Eudicots
- Order: Caryophyllales
- Family: Nyctaginaceae
- Tribe: Pisonieae
- Genus: Pisonia; L.

Type species
- Pisonia aculeata L.

Species
- See text

Synonyms
- Columella Vell.; Pallavia Vell.; Tragularia J.Koenig ex Roxb.

= Pisonia =

Genus of flowering plants

Pisonia is a genus of flowering plants in the four o'clock flower family, Nyctaginaceae. It was named for Dutch physician and naturalist Willem Piso (1611–1678). Certain species in this genus are known as catchbirdtrees, birdcatcher trees or birdlime trees because they catch birds. The sticky seeds are postulated to be an adaptation of some island species that ensures the dispersal of seeds between islands by attaching them to birds, and also allows the enriching of coralline sands. (Should a fledgling fall to the ground, become entangled in the Pisonia's sticky seeds, and be unable to free itself, then it will starve, and so enrich the soil within the tree's rootzone.) These island species include P. brunoniana of Australasia and Polynesia and P. umbellifera, which is widespread in the tropical Indo-Pacific region.

== Species ==
27 species are accepted.

- Pisonia aculeata L. – pullback (pantropical)
- Pisonia albida (Heimerl) Britton ex Standl. – corcho bobo
- Pisonia ambigua Heimerl
- Pisonia byrsonimifolia Heimerl & Ekman
- Pisonia calafia León de la Luz & R.A.Levin
- Pisonia capitata (S.Watson) Standl. – Mexican devil's-claws
- Pisonia costata (Bojer) Choisy
- Pisonia donnellsmithii Heimerl ex Standl. (El Salvador, Guatemala)
- Pisonia ekmani Heimerl (Cuba)
- Pisonia flavescens Standl.
- Pisonia floribunda Hook. f. – pega pega (Galápagos Islands)
- Pisonia grandis R.Br. – grand devil's-claws (Indo-Pacific)
- Pisonia horneae Trejo & Caraballo (named after Frances W. Horne, 1873–1967) (Puerto Rico, Northern Karst and the Sierra de Cayey)
- Pisonia indecora Heimerl
- Pisonia jamaicensis Proctor ex Caraballo, K.Campbell & S.J.Cross
- Pisonia macranthocarpa (Donn.Sm.) Donn.Sm.
- Pisonia margaretiae Proctor
- Pisonia ochracea Heimerl
- Pisonia petenensis Lundell
- Pisonia petiolaris Heimerl & Ekman
- Pisonia proctorii Lundell
- Pisonia roqueae Trejo & Caraballo (named after Ana Roqué de Duprey, 1853–1933) (Puerto Rico, Central Mountain Range and the Luquillo Mountains)
- Pisonia rotundata Griseb. – smooth devil's-claws
- Pisonia silvatica Standl.
- Pisonia subcordata Sw. – water mampoo
- Pisonia taina Trejo
- Pisonia zapallo Griseb.

=== Formerly placed here ===
- Ceodes brunoniana (Endl.) Skottsb. (as P. brunoniana Endl.) – Australasian catchbirdtree (Australasia and Polynesia)
- Ceodes gracilescens (Heimerl) E.F.S.Rossetto & Caraballo (as P. gracilescens (Heimerl) Stenmerik) – (Society Islands)
- Ceodes sechellarum (F.Friedmann) E.F.S.Rossetto & Caraballo (as P. sechellarum F.Friedmann) – (Seychelles and Mayotte)
- Ceodes taitensis (Heimerl) E.F.S.Rossetto & Caraballo (as P. taitensis (Heimerl) F.Friedmann ex J.Florence and P. siphonocarpa (Heimerl) Stemm) – (French Polynesia)
- Ceodes umbellifera J.R.Forst. & G.Forst. (as P. umbellifera (J.R.Forst. & G.Forst.) Seem.) – umbrella catchbirdtree (Indo-Pacific)
- Ceodes wagneriana (Fosberg) E.F.S.Rossetto & Caraballo (as P. wagneriana Fosberg) – Kauaʻi catchbirdtree, pāpala kēpau (island of Kauaʻi in Hawaii)
- Guapira discolor (Spreng.) Little (as P. discolor Spreng. and P. floridana Britt. ex Small) – Rock Key devil's-claws
- Rockia sandwicensis Heimerl (as P. sandwicensis Hillebr.)

== Gallery ==
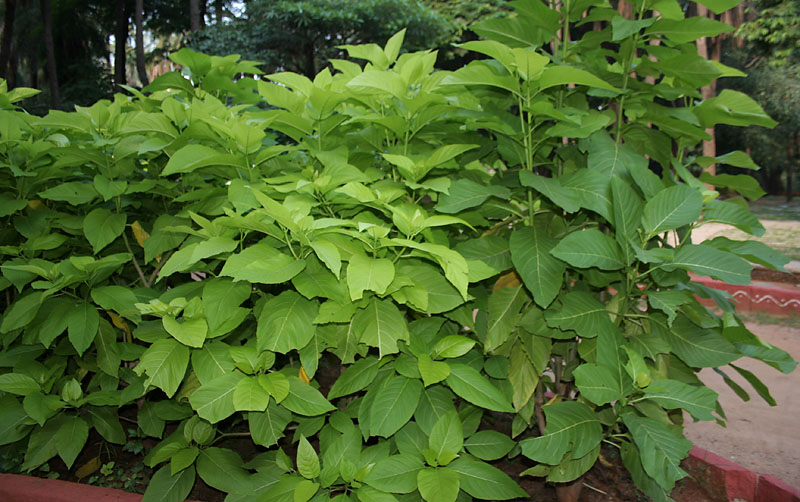
Pisonia grandis in Hyderabad, India

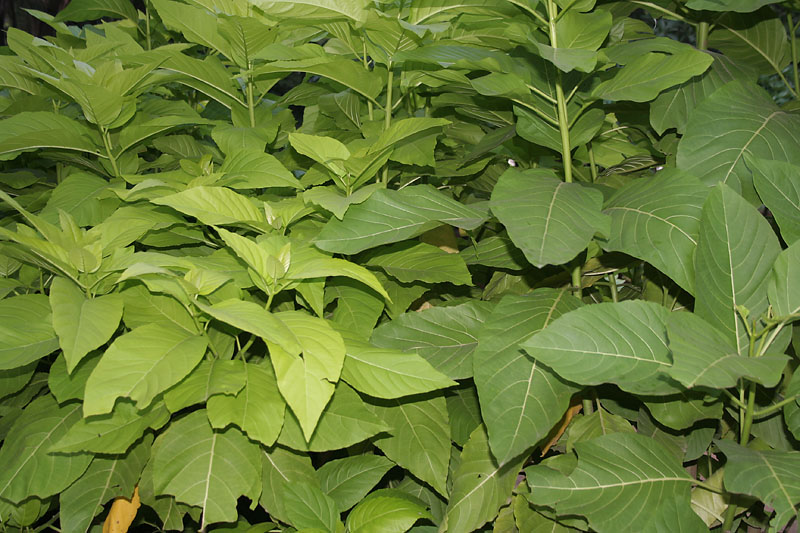
Pisonia grandis in Hyderabad
