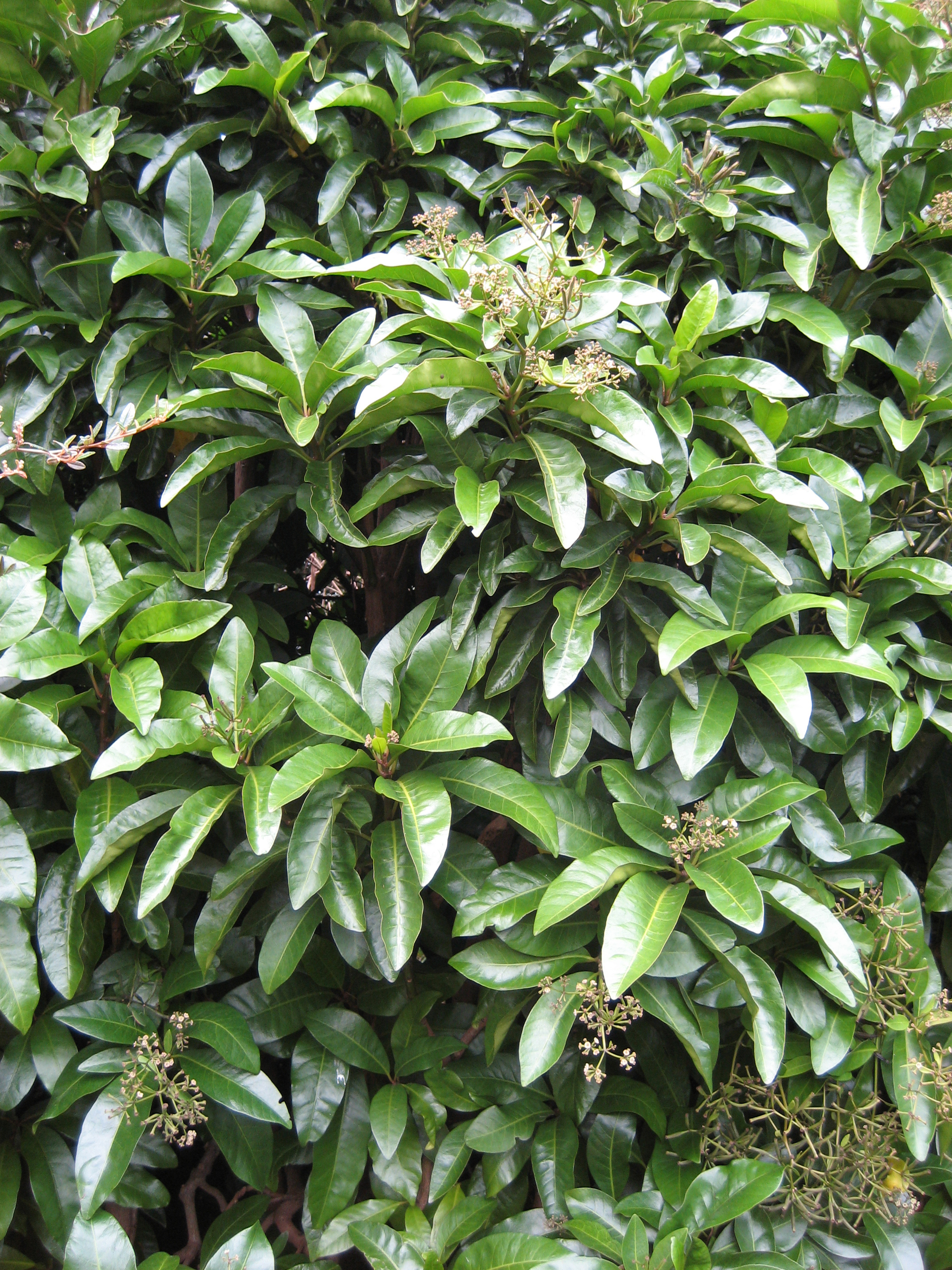

Scientific classification
- Kingdom: Plantae
- Clade: Tracheophytes
- Clade: Angiosperms
- Clade: Eudicots
- Order: Caryophyllales
- Family: Nyctaginaceae
- Genus: Ceodes
- Species: C. brunoniana

Binomial name
- Ceodes brunoniana (Endl.) Skottsb.

Synonyms
- Calpidia brunoniana (Endl.) Heimerl; Heimerlia brunoniana (Endl.) Skottsb.; Heimerliodendron brunonianum (Endl.) Skottsb.; Pisonia brunoniana Endl.; Pisonia inermis var. leiocarpa Hillebr.; Pisonia sinclairii Hook.f.

= Ceodes brunoniana =

Species of flowering tree

Ceodes brunoniana (synonym Pisonia brunoniana) is a species of flowering tree in the family Nyctaginaceae that is native to northern New Zealand, Australia's Lord Howe Island, and the Hawaiian Islands. The common names in New Zealand are parapara or birdcatcher tree. The plant is named after the botanist Robert Brown.

== Description ==
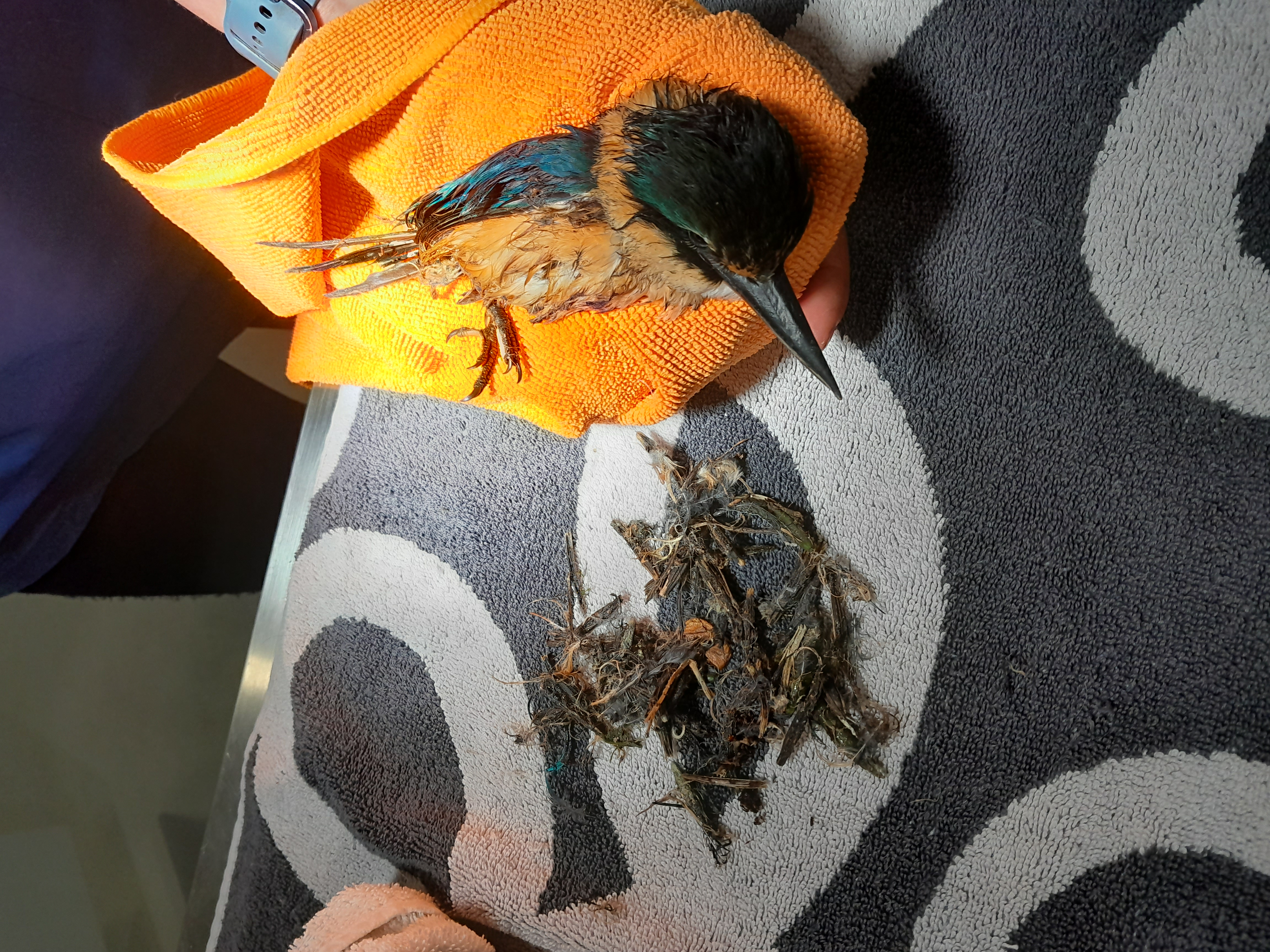
A sacred kingfisher that has flown into a birdcatcher tree

Ceodes brunoniana is a small tree, spreading to 6 metres (20 ft) or more tall. The wood is soft and the branches are brittle. The large leaves are opposite or ternate, glabrous, and glossy, entire (simple with smooth margins), and obtuse to rounded at apex. The inflorescence is paniculate, many-flowered, and the flowers are unisexual. The very sticky fruits, in which small birds are often trapped, are narrowly ellipsoidal, and 2–3 centimetres (0.79–1.18 in) long, having five ribs.

In the Seychelles, the sticky seeds of a related species, Pisonia grandis, regularly causes seabird deaths, and research suggests that the seeds evolved to be transferred on the plumage of seabirds to distant islands, enabling the long-distance dispersal of the species. The situation may be similar with P. brunoniana.

== Distribution in New Zealand ==
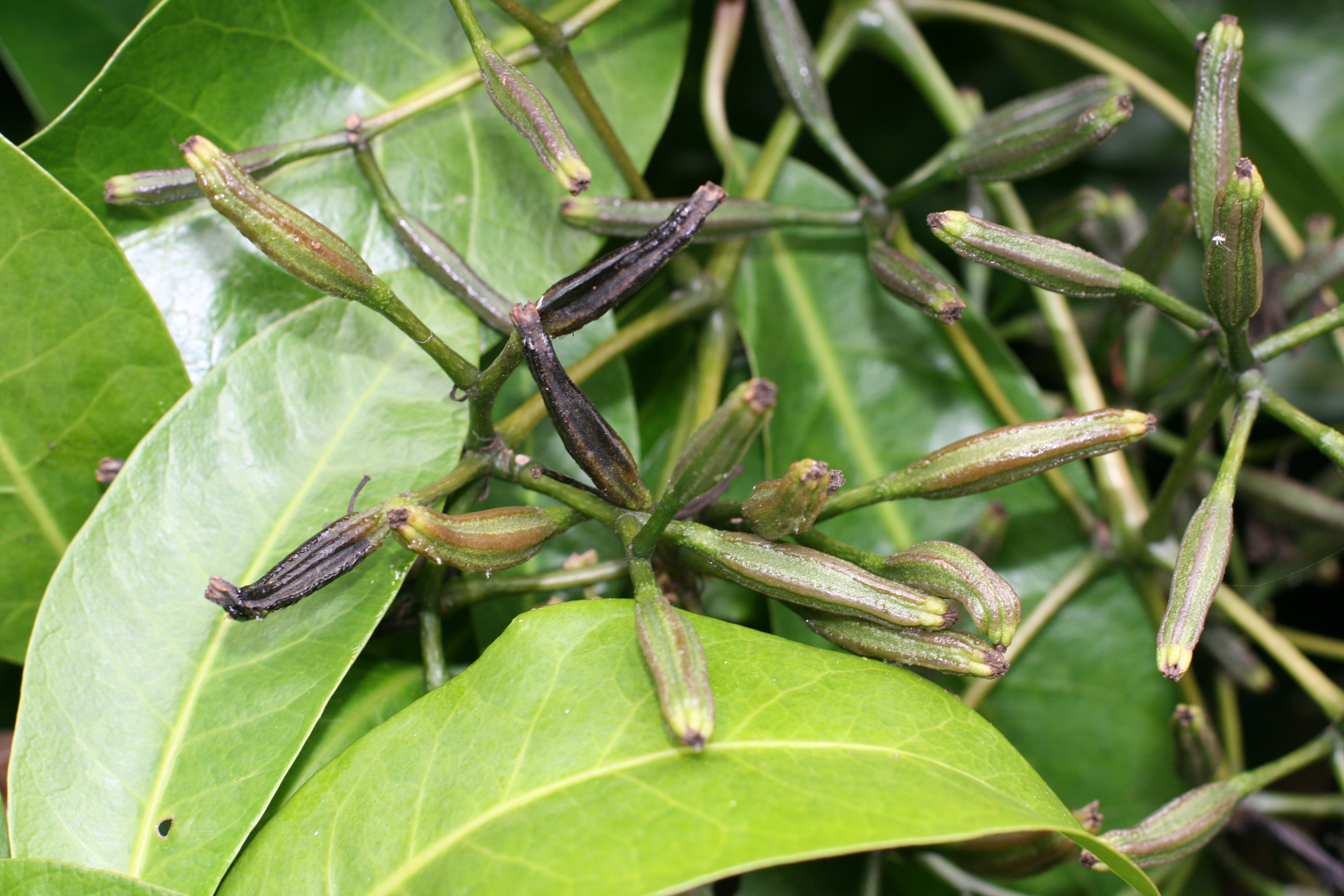
The seeds of C. brunoniana turn black and sticky as they ripen

In New Zealand, Ceodes brunoniana grows in coastal forest on Raoul Island in the Kermadec group, on the Three Kings Islands, and in the North Island in scattered locations from Whangape Harbour to Mangawhai. Historically, it grew near Auckland, on the Coromandel Peninsula and at East Cape. It is now mainly found on offshore islands, especially rodent-free islands, where it often forms an important understorey component of mixed-broadleaf forest.

The plant is almost extinct in the North Island, partly because the large leaves of C. brunoniana are eagerly eaten by browsing animals such as possums, goats and feral cattle.

The plant is reasonably common in cultivation as a decorative tree in New Zealand, especially in the northern North Island. Two variegated cultivars are sold as C. brunoniana in New Zealand nurseries, although one of these, which has leaves extensively marbled with white, may in fact be C. umbellifera, a similar species which occurs throughout the tropical Indo-Pacific.

== Usage ==
Ngāti Porou extracted oil from parapara seeds by steaming, pounding and pressing them.

== In Hawaii ==
In Hawaii, where it is known as pāpala kēpau, C. brunoniana is most common in dry to mesic habitats. Although abundant in certain locations, such as Kīpuka Puaulu, it has a relatively restricted distribution compared to the related species Rockia sandwicensis and C. umbellifera. The sticky fruits were employed by the Hawaiian kia manu (bird catchers) to trap birds in order to collect feathers for capes and other objects.
