= Birdlime =

Adhesive substance used in trapping birds

Boy preparing a bird lime twig. Veraguas, Panama 1927.

Birdlime or bird lime is an adhesive substance used in trapping birds. It is spread on a branch or twig, upon which a bird may land and be caught. Its use is illegal in many jurisdictions.

== Manufacture ==
Boy catching birds with a bird lime twig. Veraguas, Panama 1927.

Historically, the substance has been prepared in various ways, and from various materials.

In South Africa, birdlime (called voëlent in Afrikaans) is prepared from mistletoe fruits. A handful of ripe fruits is chewed until sticky, and the mass is then rubbed between the palms of the hands to form long and extremely sticky strands which are then coiled around small thin tree branches where birds perch.

A popular form in Europe was made from holly bark, boiled for 10 to 12 hours. The resulting green coating is then stored in a moist place. After two weeks, it is then pounded into a thick paste, until no wood fibres remain, and washed in running water until no small specks appear. After fermenting for four or five days, during which it is frequently skimmed, the substance is mixed over a fire with a third part of nut oil. It is then ready for use.

Another popular form made in Asia is from the Ilex integra tree. The shrub Ceodes umbellifera was also commonly used by indigenous Hawaiians.

On Orchid Island, the Tao people also use Ilex integra, which they call niket. People of the island's villages have historically used it to trap several kinds of birds. In the village of Yayo, people used it on bamboo sticks to catch the Brown-eared bulbul. Their village song describes this practice.

Birdlime from Damascus was supposed to be made of sebestens, their kernels being frequently found in it; this version was not able to endure frost or wet. That brought from Spain was said to have a bad odor. That of the Italians was made of mistletoe berries, heated, mixed with oil, as before; to make it water resistant, they added turpentine. It was said that the bark of the wayfaring tree (Viburnum lantana) made birdlime as good as the best.

Nathaniel Atcheson, secretary to the Society of Ship-Owners of Great Britain, in his 1811 work On the Origin and Progress of the North-West Company of Canada with a history of the fur trade... mentions birdlime (p 14) as an important import commodity for use in the Canadian west in the late 18th century.

=== Legal status ===
==== Europe ====
In July 2020, France was poised to outlaw "glue-trapping" (French: chasse à la glu) of birds (thrushes and blackbirds within quotas), using sticks covered in glue, after the European commission threatened legal action and fines. However, in November 2020, advocate general Juliane Kokott ruled that glue-trapping was compatible with the 2009 EU Birds Directive, and an allowable exception to the directive's ban of bird lime use.

In the Valencian region of Spain, birdlime (locally known as parany) is commonly used to capture the song thrush, which is a delicacy throughout Spain and is used in many local recipes. In spite of the EU's attempts to curb this practice, it is still tolerated in this region.

In March 2021 this practice was ruled by European Court of Justice to be illegal in the European Union.

==== Africa ====
In South Africa trapping birds with birdlime has been illegal since 1934, when Deneys Reitz, as Minister for Agriculture, passed the Wild Birds Protection Act.

=== Other uses ===
The 4th-century BC Greek writer Aeneas Tacticus recommends (34.1–2) birdlime be used as a substance which will prevent fires from burning wood or other combustible materials, when smeared upon their surfaces.

Birdlime was used in the manufacturing of British sticky bombs during World War II.

== See also ==
- Pisonia umbellifera
- The Twits
