= Pisonia donnellsmithii =

Conservation status
- Vulnerable (IUCN 2.3)

Scientific classification
- Kingdom: Plantae
- Clade: Tracheophytes
- Clade: Angiosperms
- Clade: Eudicots
- Order: Caryophyllales
- Family: Nyctaginaceae
- Genus: Pisonia
- Species: P. donnellsmithii

Binomial name
- Pisonia donnellsmithii Heimerl ex Standl.

Species of flowering plant

Pisonia donnellsmithii is a species of plant in the family Nyctaginaceae. It is found in El Salvador and Guatemala. It is threatened by habitat loss.
