= Pisonia ekmanii =

Conservation status
- Critically Endangered (IUCN 3.1)

Scientific classification
- Kingdom: Plantae
- Clade: Tracheophytes
- Clade: Angiosperms
- Clade: Eudicots
- Order: Caryophyllales
- Family: Nyctaginaceae
- Genus: Pisonia
- Species: P. ekmanii

Binomial name
- Pisonia ekmanii Heimerl

Species of flowering plant

Pisonia ekmanii is a species of flowering plant in the Nyctaginaceae family. It is a tree endemic to the Sierra de Nipe of eastern Cuba, where it is locally known as chicharrón sapo. It grows in spiny xeromorphic shrubland on serpentine soil from 350 to 700 meters elevation. It is known from four sites. Habitat degradation from mining, frequent fires, and deforestation have fragmented and diminished the species population and range, and the IUCN assesses the species as critically endangered.
