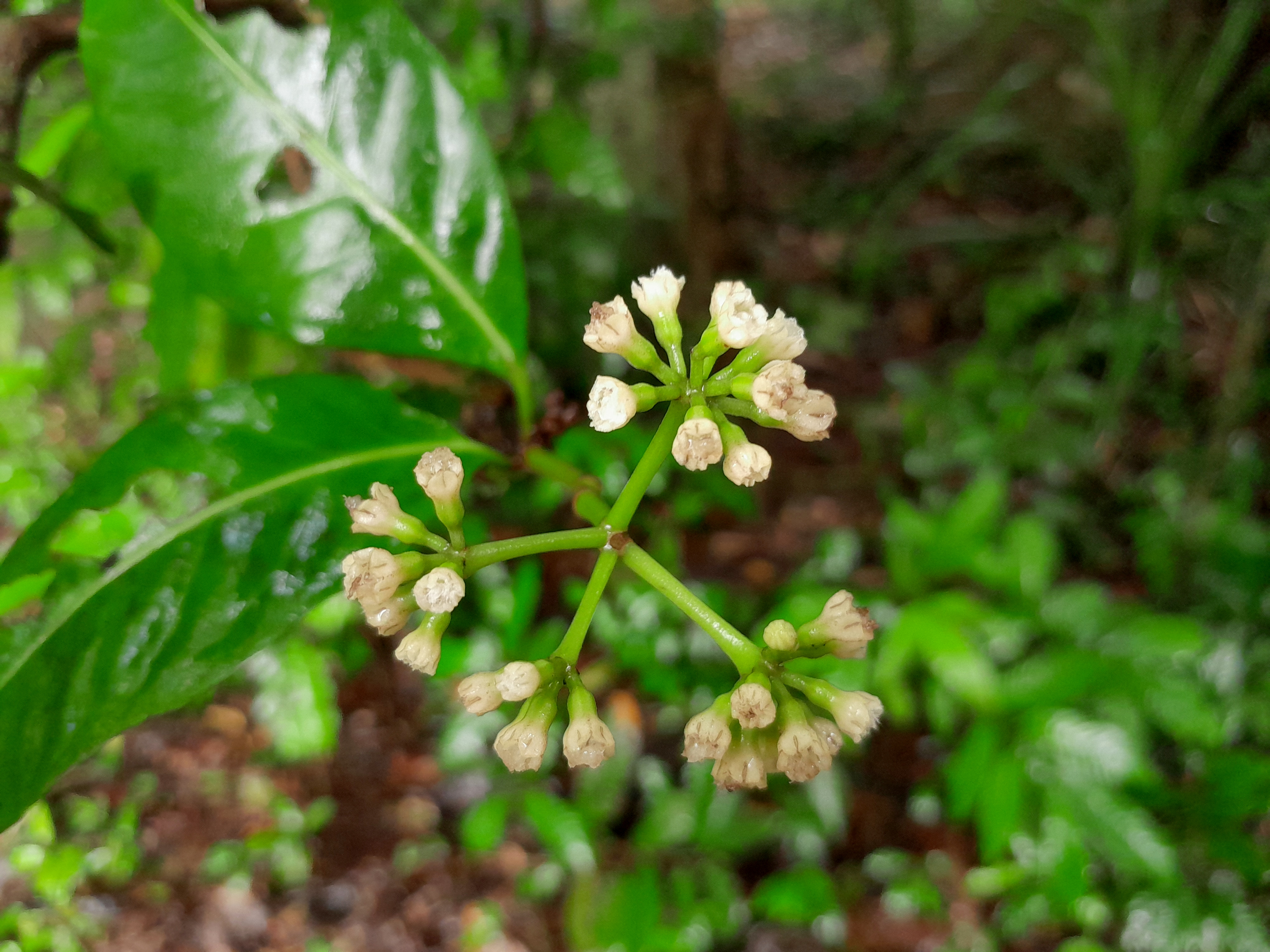
- Ceodes umbellifera

Scientific classification
- Kingdom: Plantae
- Clade: Tracheophytes
- Clade: Angiosperms
- Clade: Eudicots
- Order: Caryophyllales
- Family: Nyctaginaceae
- Genus: Ceodes; J.R.Forst. & G.Forst.

Synonyms
- Calpidia Thouars; Heimerlia Skottsb.; Heimerliodendron Skottsb.; Timeroyea Montrouz.; Vieillardia Brongn. & Gris

= Ceodes =

Genus of flowering plants

Ceodes is a genus of flowering plants belonging to the family Nyctaginaceae.

It includes 20 species which range from the western Indian Ocean islands to Indochina, Malesia, eastern Australia, and the Pacific.

== Species ==
There are 20 species assigned to this genus:

- Ceodes amplifolia (Heimerl) E.F.S.Rossetto & Caraballo – Tubuai Islands
- Ceodes artensis (Montrouz.) E.F.S.Rossetto & Caraballo – New Caledonia
- Ceodes austro-orientalis (J.Florence) E.F.S.Rossetto & Caraballo – Tuamotu (Mangareva) and Pitcairn Island
- Ceodes brownii (J.Florence) E.F.S.Rossetto & Caraballo – Marquesas (Nuku Hiva)
- Ceodes brunoniana (Endl.) Skottsb. – Lord Howe Island, Kermadec Islands, North Island of New Zealand, and Hawaiian Islands
- Ceodes cauliflora (Scheff.) E.F.S.Rossetto & Caraballo – Timor to New Guinea, Solomon Islands, Maluku, and Marianas
- Ceodes corniculata (Barg.-Petr.) Merr. & L.M.Perry – Maluku and western New Guinea
- Ceodes coronata (Heimerl) E.F.S.Rossetto & Caraballo – Tubuai Islands (Rapa Iti)
- Ceodes diandra (Pulle) E.F.S.Rossetto & Caraballo – New Guinea
- Ceodes gigantocarpa (Heimerl) E.F.S.Rossetto & Caraballo – New Caledonia
- Ceodes gracilescens (Heimerl) E.F.S.Rossetto & Caraballo – Society Islands (Tahiti)
- Ceodes lanceolata (Poir.) E.F.S.Rossetto & Caraballo – Mauritius and Réunion
- Ceodes longirostris (Teijsm. & Binn.) Merr. & L.M.Perry – Philippines, Maluku, Lesser Sunda Islands, and Papuasia
- Ceodes merytifolia (Whistler) E.F.S.Rossetto & Caraballo – Samoan Islands
- Ceodes muelleriana (Warb.) E.F.S.Rossetto & Caraballo – New Guinea and Solomon Islands
- Ceodes rapaensis (J.Florence) E.F.S.Rossetto & Caraballo – Tubuai Islands (Rapa Iti)
- Ceodes sechellarum (F.Friedmann) E.F.S.Rossetto & Caraballo – Mayotte and Seychelles (Silhouette)
- Ceodes taitensis (Heimerl) E.F.S.Rossetto & Caraballo – Society Islands
- Ceodes umbellifera J.R.Forst. & G.Forst. – Bangladesh to Indochina, Malesia, Taiwan, Ryukyu Islands, Papuasia, eastern Australia, and the Pacific
- Ceodes wagneriana (Fosberg) E.F.S.Rossetto & Caraballo – Hawaiian Islands
