= Henry Smithers =

English shipowner and abolitionist

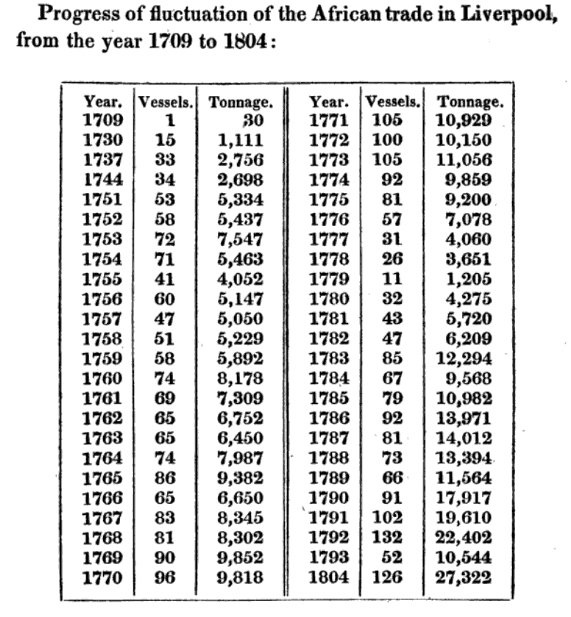
Number of slavers sailing from Liverpool 1709-1804

Henry Smithers (Bapt. 7 August 1762 - 8 April 1828, Edge Hill, Lancashire) was an English shipowner based in Southwark, London. He was an active radical and abolitionist. He wrote poetry and a number of books on commerce and economics.

Henry was the son of Joseph Smithers and Martha (née Keene). With Henry Keene he ran a coal merchants business in Clink Street.

He was proposed for membership of the Society for Constitutional Information by Joseph Towers. He was also active in the Revolution Society, serving as both steward (1788) and secretary (1789). He was a founding member of the Society of Ship-Owners of Great Britain in 1802. He went into business with his son, John Hampden Smithers, but they were declared bankrupt in 1815.

Smithers was an abolitionist and expressed these sentiments in his account of Liverpool, providing statistics on the increase in the slave trade during the eighteenth century.

== Works ==
- (1819) Observations Made During a Residence in Brussels Brussels: Self published
- (1825) Liverpool, its commerce, statistics, and institutions; with a history of the cotton trade, Liverpool: Thomas Kaye
