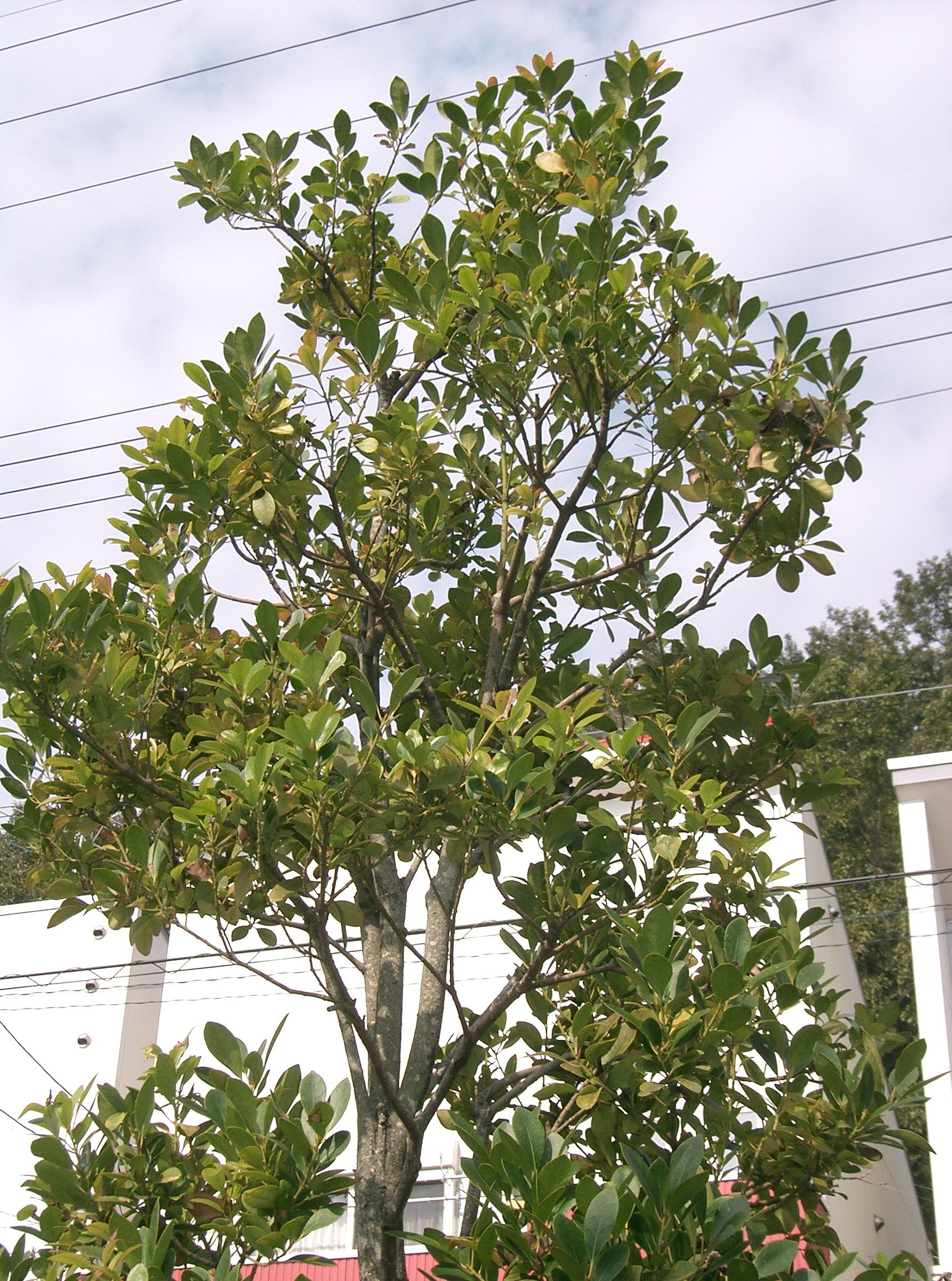
- An Ilex integra in Osaka-fu, Japan

Scientific classification
- Kingdom: Plantae
- Clade: Tracheophytes
- Clade: Angiosperms
- Clade: Eudicots
- Clade: Asterids
- Order: Aquifoliales
- Family: Aquifoliaceae
- Genus: Ilex
- Species: I. integra

Binomial name
- Ilex integra Thunb.

Synonyms
- Othera japonica Thunb.

= Ilex integra =

Species of holly

Ilex integra, the elegance female holly, also called mochi tree, is an ornamental tree of the holly genus, which is native to parts of Asia, including Korea; Taiwan; the mid-southern regions of China; and Honshu, Shikoku and Kyushu in Japan. Its flower is light yellow. The species was botanically described in 1784.

== Uses ==
The bark of the Ilex integra is an ingredient in birdlime, and it is also sometimes planted as a sacred tree.

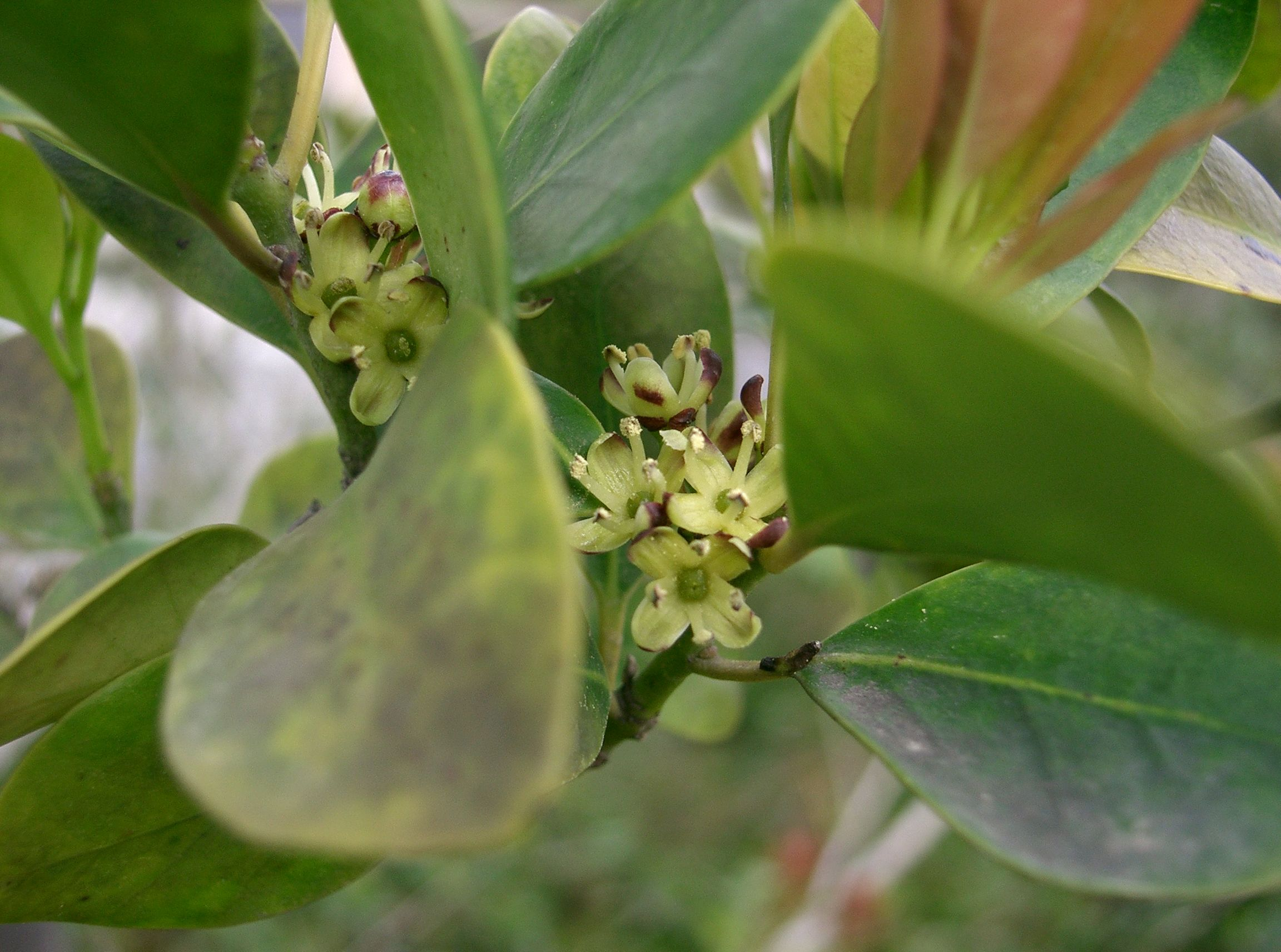
Ilex integra
