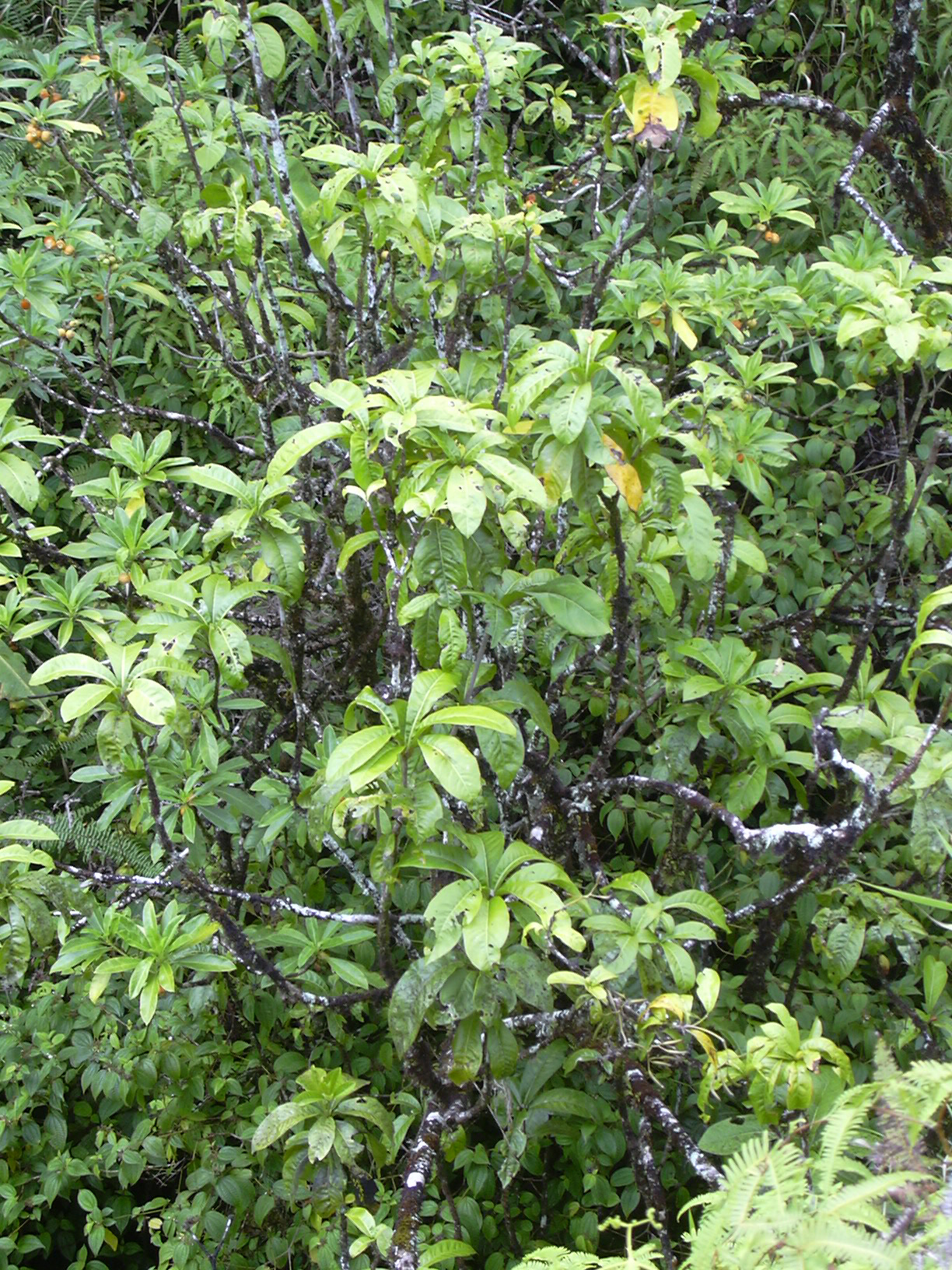

Conservation status
- Least Concern (IUCN 3.1)

Scientific classification
- Kingdom: Plantae
- Clade: Embryophytes
- Clade: Tracheophytes
- Clade: Angiosperms
- Clade: Eudicots
- Order: Caryophyllales
- Family: Nyctaginaceae
- Genus: Ceodes
- Species: C. umbellifera

Binomial name
- Ceodes umbellifera J.R.Forst. & G.Forst.

Synonyms
- Cedrota guianensis Blanco; Labordia fauriei H.Lév.; Bougainvillea racemosa Blanco; Calpidia excelsa (Blume) Heimerl; Calpidia nishimurae (Koidz.) Rehder & E.H.Wilson; Calpidia pancheriana Heimerl; Ceodes excelsa (Blume) Skottsb.; Pisonia aruensis Barg.-Petr.; Pisonia excelsa Blume; Pisonia gammillii Merr.; Pisonia macrocarpa C.Presl; Pisonia mooriana F.Muell.; Pisonia nishimurae Koidz.; Pisonia umbellata Seem.; Pisonia umbellifera (J.R.Forst. & G.Forst.) Seem.; Pisonia viscosa Seem.

= Ceodes umbellifera =

Species of tree

Ceodes umbellifera, synonym Pisonia umbellifera, commonly known as the birdlime tree or bird catcher tree, is a species of plant in the Nyctaginaceae family. The evergreen shrub has soft wood, small pink or yellow flowers, and produces cavate brown fruit throughout the period March to April. The species has been categorized under different genera in its documented lifetime, being reallocated between Pisonia and Ceodes. Its former genus, Pisonia, is named after a Dutch scientist, Willem Piso, and umbellifera is derived from Latin umbelliferum, denoting the species' big, 'shade-carrying' foliage.

The tree's fruit often trap insects, small mammals and birds. This is because the sticky sap of the fruit sticks to the skin, fur or feathers of the animal and renders it immovable. As such, ensnared creatures will often die from starvation or be unable to defend themselves from natural predators.

It grows throughout the tropical Indo-Pacific. It is native to the Andaman Islands, Indonesia, Malaysia, the Philippines, Thailand, Vietnam, China, Taiwan, Hawaii, Africa and Madagascar and the states of New South Wales and Queensland in Australia. A variegated form is widely cultivated in frost-free climates. Historically, the shrub has some remedial herbal use in indigenous Hawaiian and Chinese culture. Due to this, it has been the subject of limited scientific study examining its medicinal properties.

== Description ==
=== Morphology ===
Ceodes umbellifera is a shrub with large, medium green leaves. Other variegated varieties exist (Ceodes umbellifera 'Variegata') with marbling of white, light and dark green on the shrub's leaves. The tree's elliptic to ovate leaves may be between 6 and 20 cm long, and 4 to 10 cm wide. They are hairless and glossy with a papery texture. Each leaf has between 8 and 10 light lateral veins on each side, ‘without distinctly contrasting dark veins’. The petiole of each leaf is thick, between 0.5 and 5 cm long, and sometimes exstipulate.

There are discrepancies between sources regarding the height of the shrub. Most state that Ceodes umbellifera will grow to between 4 and 12 metres. Some sources suggest the tallest known specimen is 20 metres tall, whilst another reports a height of 28 metres. Once mature, the tree has a spreading, rounded crown which may cover over 20 feet.

In summer, the tree will start to bud and produce flowers. Before blooming, the buds of the flower stem form a complex, terminal inflorescence. Buds are around 6 cm in height, and have a pale brown, chickpea-like appearance. The inflorescence is either hairless, or has fine, silky hairs. Peduncles to the buds and flowers may be between 3.5 and 4 cm. These branch out at the apex, forming what botanist Debasmita Pramanick describes as ‘loose umbel[s] or contrated panicle[s]’ to spawn 3-8 flowers. The pedicels (stem connecting flower/bud to inflorescence) from here are green, hairless and between 1 and 2.5 mm long.

The flowers consist of small pink or yellow petals in a rounded funnel formation, with short white stems protruding from the centre. Each flower has between 1 and 4 lance-shaped bracts, joined at the base or apex of the pedicel. The bracts are membranous with one main nerve or vein. The plant's perianth is campanulate, or ‘bell-shaped’, described by Pramanick as having ‘reflexed triangular 5-lobes' and ‘short brown hairs’. The flower has between 6 and 14 protruding stamens, with a threadlike filament (stalk). At the end of each filament is an orange anther, attached to the stalk at the back of its subglobose shape. These anthers have a longitudinal dehiscence, meaning that they will split along the long axis at maturity, releasing pollen.

After flowering, the shrub produces small fruit. These are the colloquial namesake of the tree, which is also known as 'birdlime'; due to the fruit's secretion of a sticky substance, small birds may often become ensnared in this substance and are unable to fly away. The viscid fruit are dark brown and purple, cylindrical in shape and about 2–4 cm long. They are indehiscent, meaning they do not produce an internal seed at ripeness. They are ribbed with 5 vertical ribbings. The fruit is hairless and is described as 'coriaceous', meaning leather like. The fruit bears pedicels between 4–10 cm long.

Ceodes umbellifera is distinguished from similar taxa, such as Pisonia sechellarum, by reflexed ‘perianth lobes of the pistillate flowers’ and inconspicuous anthrocarpal glands.

=== Phytochemistry ===
Studies state that there is not sufficient research on the chemical constitution of this genus. A 1996 study found that Ceodes umbellifera had six different saponins, with three of these being ‘new oleanolic acid saponins’. Secopisonic acid, pisodienone, pisoninol I and II have also been extracted from the plant. A 2018 study assessing anti-inflammatory and cytotoxic properties of Ceodes umbellifera discovered 12 new compounds in the plant's stem.

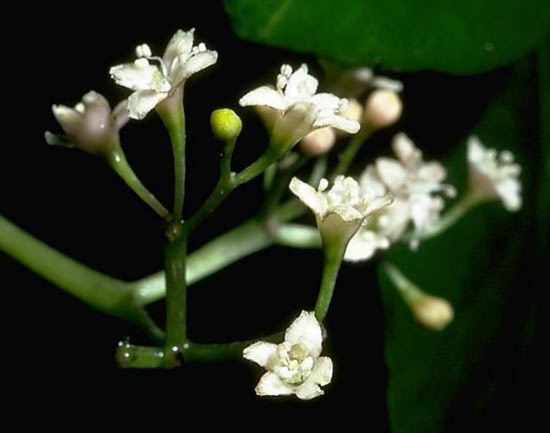
Flowers

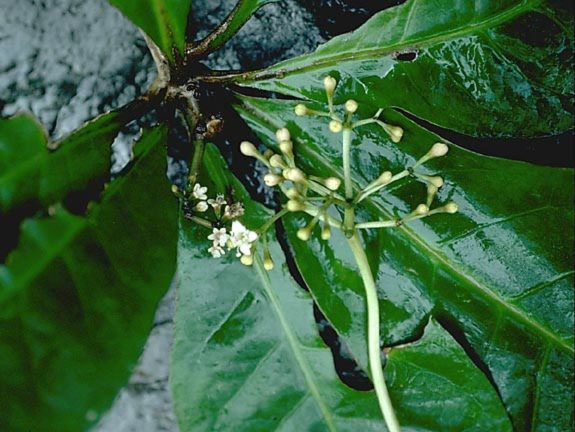
Buds and flowers

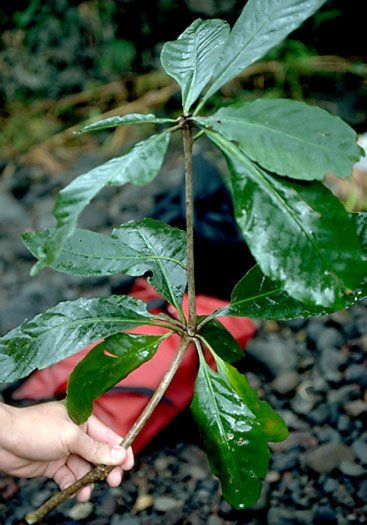
The leaves and stalk

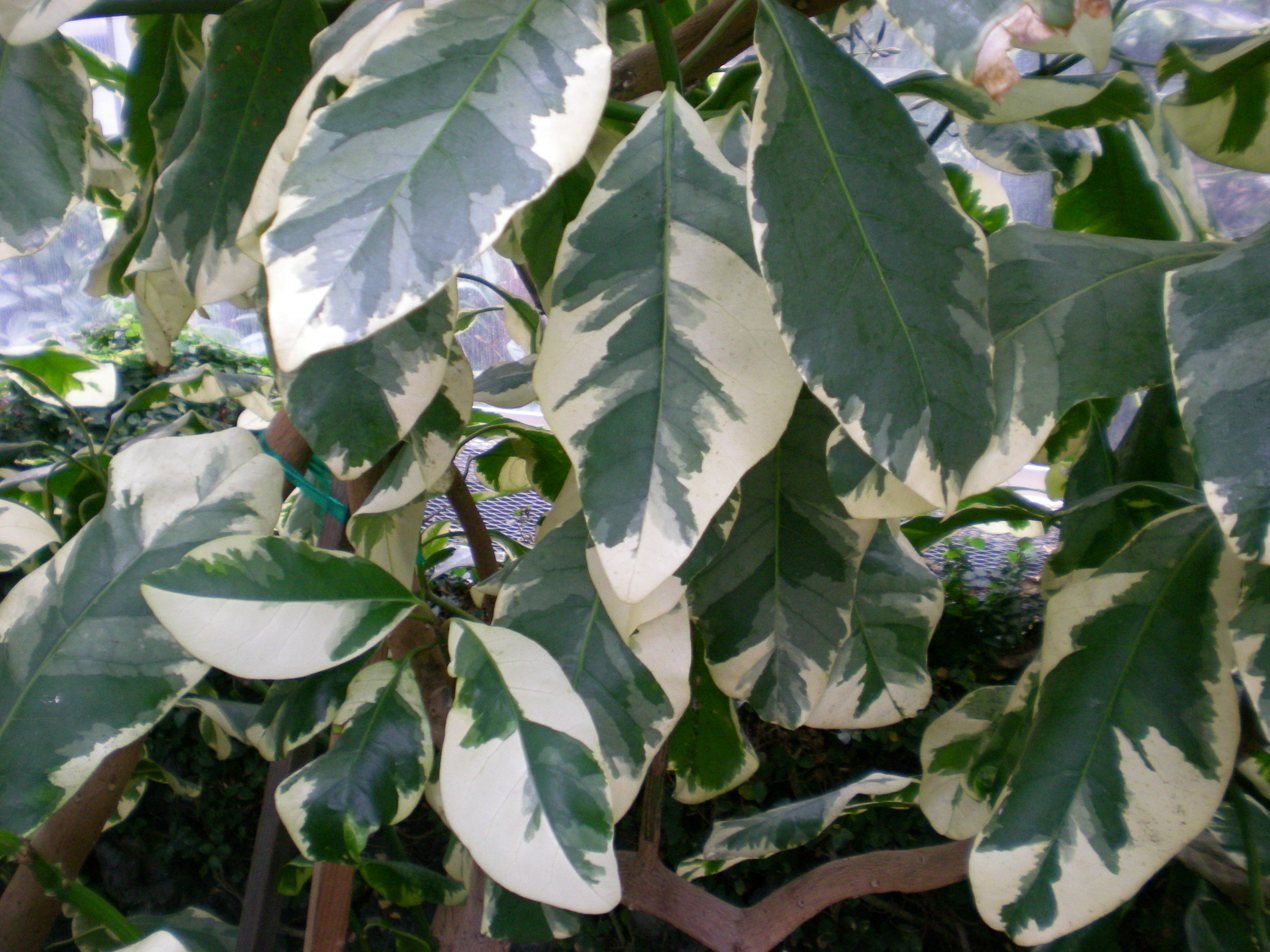
P. umbellifera 'Variegata'

== Taxonomy ==
The species was first described by Johann Reinhold Forster and Georg Forster in 1776 as Ceodes umbellifera. The genus Pisonia of the Pisonieae tribe has a "convoluted taxonomic history" that has involved Ceodes umbellifera being moved at various times to the genus Pisonia. Ceodes umbellifera was the first species placed in the genus Ceodes. It was first discovered in 1776 by J.R. Forster and G. Forster in Vanuatu. It was distinguished from other like species by the "absence of stalked glands along the ribs of anthocarps". Forster and Forster placed the species in Ceodes rather than Pisonia.

In 1804, Du Petit-Thouars found similar species in Mauritius which also lacked glands on their anthocarps. He classified them under a new genera Calpidia, which modern botanists suggest essentially had the same characteristics as Ceodes. It is likely that, as Elson Felipe Rossetto and Marcos Caraballo suggest, Du Petit-Thouars was not aware of the description and categorisation of Ceodes "28 years earlier". An 1880 classification by Bentham and Hooker retained both Ceodes and Calipidia as genera interchangeable with Pisonia. They introduced Timeroyea as a new genus apart from these, characterised by "inconspicuous anthrocarpal glands" but with more than 25 stamens.

In 1866, Berthold Carl Seemann transferred it to the genus Pisonia as Pisonia umbellifera, along with the other species placed in Ceodes. Subsequent work by Heirmel in 1889 specified Timeroyae as a subcategory of Pisonia, with another new subcategory Prismatocarpae introduced, for specimens with fewer than 15 stamens. Rossetto and Caraballo note that, "in this treatment, Calpidia was listed as a synonym of Pisonia, while Ceodes was not mentioned at all".

Heirmel revised this in 1913, splitting Calpidia and Pisonia, with the former to include Prismatocarpae and Timeroyae, both of which did not have anthrocarpal glands. Calpidia and Pisonia were distinguished by "the absence of bracteoles, having a reduced perisperm that forms gelatinous traces and starch accumulation in the embryo".

In a 1926 paper, Skottsberg suggested Ceodes as a genus instead of Calpidia, using an argument, described by Rossetto and Caraballo, "that there were extant original specimens and that the scant description of the genus was similar to other names published during the late 18th century". However this work ignored the specimen umbellifera. Skottsberg's later research, published in 1936, acknowledged only one specific Ceodes type, Ceodes umbellifera, but also including "Ce. excelsa and Ce. forsteriana as synonyms". Heimerl's 1937 work also included this change but featured Ceodes umbellifera as the only Ceodes taxon.

In 1964, Stemmerik proposed a change which reincorporated Ceodes into Pisonia. Several morphological traits were omitted from this classification, such as "the absence of bracts and bracteoles at the upper portion of the pedicels, presence of starch in the embryo and number of apertures in pollen grains". Stemmerik suggested that since not all of these were constant traits then they should not be regarded in the classification.

In 2019, a study by Rossetto and colleagues used the molecular data of the species' DNA to reveal that the Pisonia genus was non-monophyletic. It was suggested to resurrect the genera Rockia and Ceodes in replacement of Pisonia. This rendered the genera monophyletic. In 2020, it was generally accepted that Ceodes should be restored, including Ceodes umbellifera. This placement is accepted by Plants of the World Online, as of May 2021.

== Distribution and habitat ==
=== Distribution ===
Ceodes umbellifera may be found in a diverse range of climates worldwide. The plant is native to Australia, Southern China, Thailand, Vietnam, Taiwan, Malaysia, Philippines, Indonesia, Hawaii and many Polynesian islands. It is also naturally occurring in some parts of Africa and Madagascar.

In Australia, the species is found along the east coast in the states of New South Wales and Queensland, where it is 'widespread, but not common'. In NSW, it is found along the North Coast and Central Coast regions. It mostly grows in rainforests north of the Shoalhaven region.

In Hawaii, Ceodes umbellifera is known as 'pāpala' or 'pāpala kēpau'. It is particularly endemic in the areas of Kauaʻi, Oʻahu, Lānaʻi and Maui, but has also been found on mainland Hawaii and Molokaʻi. In Hawaii, the species will be found in areas receiving "50-100 inches" of rainfall annually and in regions between "150-1999" feet above sea level.

=== Habitat ===
Generally, its ideal growing conditions are between about 16 and 20°C (c. 61–68°F). It may only be grown in frost-free environments and gardens, and similarly will not tolerate sustained heat. However, some rare accounts describe the tree surviving to as cold as c. -3°C (26°F).

The plant requires high humidity and moderate moisture, although "established plants are drought tolerant". Most often, reliably moist soil with high potassium is needed, but the species will survive dry soil with occasional watering.

Moderate amounts of sunlight are needed, with most growing instructions designating part shade or full sun. When grown as an indoor plant, gardeners suggest "four hours of direct sunlight ... bright light the rest of the time".

In the wild, Ceodes umbellifera is often found in rainforests, on islands and along coastlines and in shady, moist gullies. Therefore, it is largely found in countries with tropical regions.

== Ecology ==
The fruit of Ceodes umbellifera exude a sticky sap, which often sticks to wildlife passing by the tree. Small animals, such as birds, reptiles and insects are often trapped in the substance and starve to death.

Largely it is seabirds, dwelling on off-shore islands, that die in the fruits of the shrub. However, there are some accounts of mainland birds becoming stuck. Scientists in the Goldsborough Valley, south of Cairns in Queensland, Australia, discovered a female Buff-breasted Paradise Kingfisher who was "completely immobilised, unable even to flap her wings".

It is generally agreed that the tree's birdlime is an adaptation, enabling the tree to pollinate; pollen will adhere to a bird, and be deposited somewhere else, where a new plant may grow. However, some botanists suggest that the extreme stickiness may have evolutionary advantages outside of pollination. Since Ceodes umbellifera is widespread on tropical island rainforests, it is plausible that when the plant "traps and kills animals" it is "creating pockets of nutrients in the immediate soil environment for seedlings". This is especially important on islands because often their soil is not as fertile and nutrient rich.

Some credible sources state that the soft wood of the tree is sometimes broken open by elephants, who drink the sap ‘with relish’, and also that sheep will eat it and ‘get over their teeth a golden colour and appeared just like gold’. These claims have not been verified or repeated by other authoritative sources.

=== Gould's Petrels ===
The tree presents a threat to the Gould's Petrel population on Cabbage Tree Island, Australia, since the birds are classified as a threatened species. Petrels' entanglement in the viscous fruit sap has been identified as a major cause of mortality by Australian ornithologists. In some cases, a single fruit was enough to trap a bird and cause its death. During 1992 and 1993, some of the Ceodes umbellifera plants on Cabbage Tree Island were subject to herbicide poisoning, in an attempt to reduce the threat to Gould's Petrels and improve their endangerment status. This was largely successful, although other natural threats to the petrel remain. The graph below depicts the likely causes of death of 122 petrel carcasses, collected in the period 1968 to 1975. Australian ornithologists inspected the skeletons to deduce the most likely cause of death. It was suggested that the undamaged carcasses were most likely of birds that had died from entrapment in the fruits of Ceodes umbellifera.

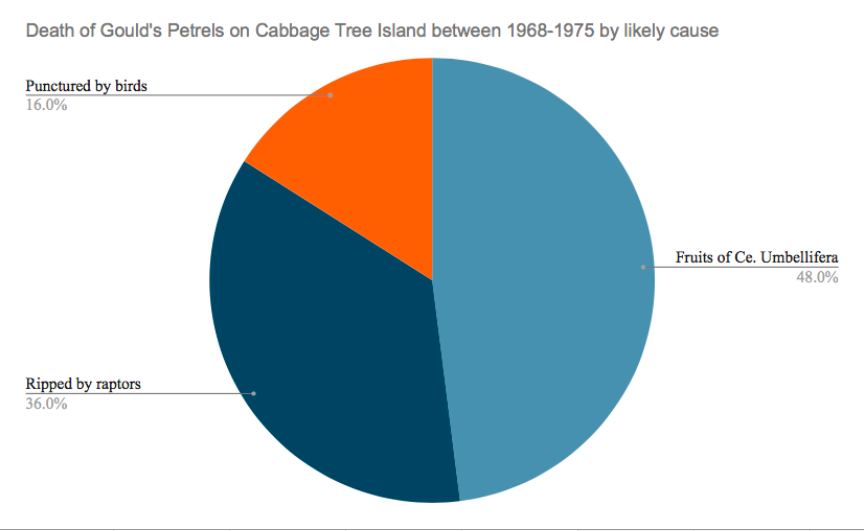
The most likely causes of death for Gould's petrels, the carcasses of which were gathered between 1968 and 1975

== Uses ==
=== Traditional medicine ===
In Hawaii, the tree was used for a variety of purposes by early indigenous people. Leaves of Ceodes umbellifera is used as a general purpose medicine for digestive issues and childhood disease. It was similarly used in Chinese culture by Li folk of the Hainan province.

In their paper on saponins found in the shrub's leaves, Lavaud and Beauvir state that "In Vanuatu, the leaves of P. umbellifera are also used as a treatment for ciguatera poisoning and as a 'green manure'. Further, Melensian ‘market-gardeners’ will reportedly bury Ceodes umbellifera leaves amongst the soil to prevent phytophage nematodes in crops.

=== Medicinal Research ===
Potential medicinal properties of pisonia umbellifera have been the subject of scientific investigation. One study found that compounds extracted from the leaves of pisonia umbellifera could have ‘antitubercular activity’ under certain circumstances. Another study aimed to ascertain the anti-inflammatory and cytotoxic activities of compounds found in the plant's stems, with no notable results.

=== Culture ===
In Hawaii, the tree's leaves and bark are also used as a stable source of food for pigs.

The adhesive sap from the fruit is also commonly used by indigenous Hawaiians. The sap may be made into a paste with soil and clay, and used to mend broken bowls. Red soil or other natural colours were used to adjust the colour of the birdlime to match the bowl or other implement. This mixture would then be used to join broken parts or fill holes, left to dry and then smoothed with a pumice stone. Additionally, it is used by indigenous men to catch birds, from which the feathers are plucked and used for traditional garments, called ‘ahu’ula. These garments consisted of netting to which feathers were attached. Certain coloured feathers denoted different social statuses. This is likely because of the rarity of certain coloured birds and their feathers, and the associated bird-hunting prowess required to catch them. The bird lime of papala kepau was used for these tasks when it was available during its fruiting months, but otherwise a small net was used to trap birds.

== See also ==
- Birdlime
