= Pitt Clubs =

Pitt Clubs were private members clubs formed in Great Britain in the 18th and 19th century to memorialise William Pitt the Younger (1759–1806). Although the London Pitt Club was formed in 1793, it was only after the death of Pitt that more "country" Pitt clubs were established outside London. Only the Cheshire, Cambridge, and London Pitt Clubs still operate.

== London Pitt Club ==
The London Pitt Club was formed in 1793 by Nathaniel Atcheson with a view to counteract the radical ideas of the French Revolution. Originally the club met on the birthdays of George III and his Queen Charlotte of Mecklenburg-Strelitz Following Pitt's resignation in 1801 they also celebrated Pitt's birthday on 28 May. Following his death, the London club was relaunched in 1808.

== Other Pitt Clubs ==
Other Pitt Clubs were formed in at least 45 towns.

- Altrincham
- Birmingham
- Blackburn
- Blackburn Hundred.
- Bolton.
- Bristol.
- Carlisle
- Colchester
- Derby
- Devon and Exeter
- Doncaster
- Dudley (1813)
- Dundee
- Glasgow
- Halifax
- Hampshire
- Hereford
- Hull
- Lancaster
- Leeds
- Leicester
- Liverpool
- Manchester
- Menai
- Northumberland and Newcastleupon-Tyne
- Northwich 1814 (re-founded in 1932 as the Mid-Cheshire Pitt Club, re-named Cheshire Pitt Club in 1998).
- Norwich
- Nottingham
- Plymouth
- Reading and Berkshire
- Rochdale
- Saddleworth
- Scarborough
- Scotland
- Sheffield (1810)
- North and South Shields
- Staffordshire and Newcastleunder-Lyme
- Stirling
- Suffolk (1821)
- Sunderland
- Taunton and Somersetshire
- Wales
- Warrington
- Wolverhampton
- York

== University Pitt Club, Cambridge ==
The University Pitt Club, founded in Cambridge in 1835 soon became a purely social club.
