= Nathaniel Atcheson =

English ship-owner

Nathaniel Atcheson (1772-1825) was an English ship-owner who was appointed secretary to a Committee of London shipowners and the Society of Ship-Owners of Great Britain with whom the London Committee was associated.

Atcheson formed the London Pitt Club in 1793 with a view to counteract the radical ideas of the French Revolution.

== Ship building research ==
In 1806 he started conducted research on ship-builders in London with the help of Charles Jenkinson. He wrote to a number of ship builders to enquire how many ships they had built since December 1802.

Ship builder	Location
John Perry, Wells and co.	Blackwall
Samuel and Daniel Brent	Rotherhithe
Thomas Pitcher	Northfleet
Peter Mestear	Rotherhithe
John Dudman	Deptford
William and Edward George Barnard	Deptford
Woolcombe	Rotherhithe
Curling	Limehouse
Almon Hill	Limehouse
John Ayles	Wapping
Tibbits, Hitchcock and co.	Limehouse
Joshua Young	Rotherhithe
Fletcher	Shadwell
E. Thompson	Rotherhithe

== Writing ==
In 1803, he authored the Report of the Case Fisher against Ward respecting the Russian Embargo on British Ships. The blockade was initiated by Paul I of Russia and Fisher was a crew member of the Fishburn.
