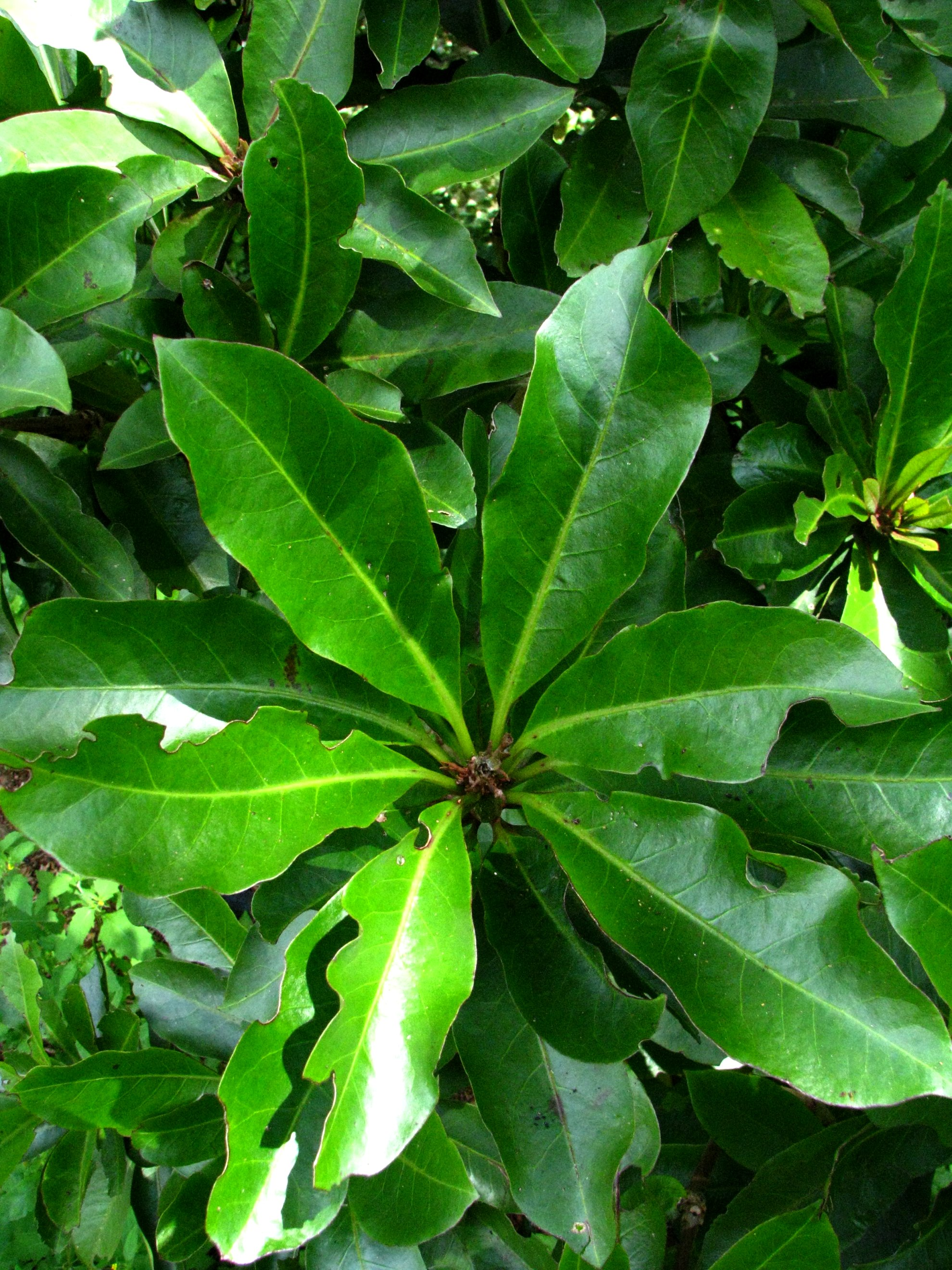

Conservation status
- Endangered (IUCN 3.1)

Scientific classification
- Kingdom: Plantae
- Clade: Tracheophytes
- Clade: Angiosperms
- Clade: Eudicots
- Order: Caryophyllales
- Family: Nyctaginaceae
- Genus: Ceodes
- Species: C. wagneriana

Binomial name
- Ceodes wagneriana (Fosberg) E.F.S.Rossetto & Caraballo

Synonyms
- Pisonia wagneriana Fosberg

= Ceodes wagneriana =

Pāpala kēpau

Species of tree

Ceodes wagneriana, the pāpala kēpau or Kauaʻi catchbirdtree, is a species of flowering tree in the Bougainvillea family, Nyctaginaceae, that is endemic to Kauaʻi in the Hawaiian Islands. It is threatened by habitat loss.
