= Ceodes gracilescens =

Conservation status
- Critically Endangered (IUCN 3.1)

Scientific classification
- Kingdom: Plantae
- Clade: Tracheophytes
- Clade: Angiosperms
- Clade: Eudicots
- Order: Caryophyllales
- Family: Nyctaginaceae
- Genus: Ceodes
- Species: C. gracilescens

Binomial name
- Ceodes gracilescens (Heimerl) E.F.S.Rossetto & Caraballo (2020)

Synonyms
- Calpidia gracilescens Heimerl (1913); Pisonia gracilescens (Heimerl) Stemm. (1964)

Species of flowering plant

Ceodes gracilescens is a species of flowering plant in the Nyctaginaceae family. It is a tree endemic to the island of Tahiti in the Society Islands of French Polynesia.
