= Ceodes taitensis =

Conservation status
- Least Concern (IUCN 3.1)

Scientific classification
- Kingdom: Plantae
- Clade: Embryophytes
- Clade: Tracheophytes
- Clade: Spermatophytes
- Clade: Angiosperms
- Clade: Eudicots
- Order: Caryophyllales
- Family: Nyctaginaceae
- Genus: Ceodes
- Species: C. taitensis

Binomial name
- Ceodes taitensis (Heimerl) E.F.S.Rossetto & Caraballo

Synonyms
- Calpidia taitensis Heimerl; Ceodes siphonocarpa Heimerl; Pisonia siphonocarpa (Heimerl) Stemm.; Pisonia taitensis (Heimerl) F.Friedmann ex J.Florence

Species of flowering plant

Ceodes taitensis is a species of flowering plant in the Nyctaginaceae family. It is a shrub or tree endemic to the Society Islands of French Polynesia.
