= Rockia =

Scientific classification
- Kingdom: Plantae
- Clade: Tracheophytes
- Clade: Angiosperms
- Clade: Eudicots
- Order: Caryophyllales
- Family: Nyctaginaceae
- Genus: Rockia; Heimerl
- Species: R. sandwicensis

Binomial name
- Rockia sandwicensis (Hillebr.) Heimerl

Synonyms
- Pisonia sandwicensis Hillebr.

Species of flowering plant

Rockia is a monotypic genus of flowering plants belonging to the family Nyctaginaceae. The only species is Rockia sandwicensis (Hillebr.) Heimerl. It is also within Tribe Pisonieae. It was once merged with Pisonia before recently in 2020 being separated again.

== Description ==
A small to medium-sized evergreen tree, that grows up to 15 m (49 ft) tall, with up to 3 trunks, which are all about 30–60 cm (12–24 in) in diameter. The bark is dark grey, smoothish to finely fissured. The inner bark is whitish, slightly bitter. The twigs (or branches) are light grey with large raised half-round leaf scars. The leaves are glossy green, alternate (arranged), hairless with slender leafstalks of about 3–5 cm (1–2 in) long. They have large oblong blades, which are 10–30 cm (4–12 in) long and 6–15 cm (2–6 in) wide. They are leather-like, blunt, rounded or slightly notched at the apex. They are broad and rounded at the base, edges are smooth (and not toothed), and the upper surface is shiny dark green with visible side veining and are paler underneath. The trees flower during the summer months from June to August. The flowers are clusters rounded on stalks of 3–6 cm (1–2 in) long, at the leaf bases. It is dioecious. There are many male and female flowers but on different trees. The females have 2–3 scales or bracts at the base and narrow greenish tubular calyx about 6 mm long, which is finely hairy and fragrant. The male flowers are stalkless, with a rounded head about 5 cm (2 in) in diameter. It consists of a deeply 5–6 lobed tubular calyx with 5 short lobes. It has about 20 very small sterile stamens inside the tube and a pistil with a narrow ovary, slender style and enlarged fringed stigma. The fruit (or seed capsule), is cylindrical, about 4 cm (2 in) long and very narrow, widest below the middle, composed of enlarged calyx with lobes at the apex and many faint lines and enclosing the narrow 1 seeded fruit (or achene) with a style at the apex. The fruit have a sticky coating and can trap small creatures such as birds, lizards & insects. This can kill the trapped individual if they do not free themselves.

The wood or timber is unused (by natives and woodworkers) and is whitish, soft, very lightweight and porous. It becomes honeycomb-like when dried. It is highly susceptible to fungal staining. The branches are brittle and are easily broken. The wood can be slightly damaged by Teredo (a marine borers).

== Distribution and habitat ==
It is native to Hawaii.

It is found in dry forests, where it grows at altitudes of 610–752 metres (2,001–2,467 ft) above sea level.

== Taxonomy ==
It is known in Hawaii as 'Aulu', 'Kaulu', 'Papala' or 'Papala kepau'.

The genus name of Rockia is in honour of Joseph Rock (1884–1962), an Austrian-American botanist, explorer, geographer, linguist, ethnographer and photographer. The Latin specific epithet of sandwicensis refers to the "Sandwich Islands," as the Hawaiian Islands were once called, and named by James Cook on one of his voyages in the 1770s. James Cook named the islands after John Montagu, 4th Earl of Sandwich for supporting Cook's voyages.

Both genus and species were first described and published Oesterr. Bot. Z. Vol.63 on page 289 in 1913.

The species was merged with Pisonia L. in 1964, but then in 2020, it was re-separated again.

The genus is not yet recognized by the United States Department of Agriculture and the Agricultural Research Service, (as of 7 July 2010) as they still regard it as a synonym of Pisonia L..
