= Society of Ship-Owners of Great Britain =

The Society of Ship-Owners of Great Britain (SOGB) was an organisation established by British ship-owners in 1802 to defend their interests by opposing breaches of the Navigation Acts. The decision to form the organisation was reached at a meeting held on 22 June in London.

The ship owners were concerned that while their operating costs such as taxation, naval supplies, wages and insurance, had increased, foreign competition meant their freight rates were kept low. Many ships stood idle while others ran at a loss. They campaigned for American ships to be excluded from British colonies and fought the American Intercourse Bill of 1806.

== Membership ==
The SOGB was organised around port committees with the principal committee being that of London.

=== Members of the London Committee ===
The committee was composed as follows: Chairman: John Hill (also trustee)

- Joseph and Peter Ainsley
- John Akenhead
- Thomas and Robert Brown
- John Blacket
- Ralph Clarke
- William Clark (junior)
- Norrison Coverdale
- Robert Curling
- William Curling
- Anthony Collins
- Joseph and W. Dowson
- Thomas Davison
- James Dunning
- George French
- William Fairles
- Henry Fletcher
- Thomas Gillespy (Trustee)
- Sir Cuthbert Heron
- Heathfield, Pycroft and Heathfield
- William Havelock
- Thomas Hayman
- Ives Hurry
- Hough and Jackson
- Archibald Heurtley
- John Jackson
- Thomas Keddey
- Peter Kennion
- John Lyall
- William Marshall
- Richard Mordey
- William Moorsom
- Thomas Metcalfe
- William Masterman
- D. Macarthy
- Robert Pedder
- Thomas Rowcroft
- Joshua Reeve
- Isaac Robinson (trustee)
- John Shuttleworth
- Henry Smithers
- Daniel Stephens
- J. R. Sherman
- William Thompson
- John Tulloch
- Thomas and George Wilkinson
- Richard Wilson (junior)
- Thomas S. Williams
- John Woodcock

Nathaniel Atcheson was appointed secretary for both the London Committee and that of the society as a whole.

=== Other ports ===
Secretaries were appointed for other ports:

- North Shields: William Harrison
- South Shields: William Blackburn
- Sunderland: Thomas Sanderson

Ship owners from Bristol, Leith, Kirkcaldy, Bridlington and various other ports expressed an interest in supporting the association.

== Publications ==
The SOGB published material relevant to shipowners and their campaigns.

- Collection of Interesting and Important Reports and Papers on the Navigation and Trade of Great Britain, Ireland, and the British Colonies in the West Indies and America, 1807
