= Ceodes sechellarum =

Conservation status
- Endangered (IUCN 3.1)

Scientific classification
- Kingdom: Plantae
- Clade: Tracheophytes
- Clade: Angiosperms
- Clade: Eudicots
- Order: Caryophyllales
- Family: Nyctaginaceae
- Genus: Ceodes
- Species: C. sechellarum

Binomial name
- Ceodes sechellarum (F.Friedmann) E.F.S.Rossetto & Caraballo

Synonyms
- Pisonia sechellarum F.Friedmann

Species of tree

Pisonia sechellarum (synonym Pisonia sechellarum) is a species of flowering plant in the family Nyctaginaceae. It is indigenous to the Seychelles and Mayotte in the Comoros archipelago. In Seychelles, it is limited to Silhouette Island, where it is the dominant tree but has a total population of about 190 individuals.
