= The Boat Race 1849 =

Two University Boat Races took place in 1849:

- March 1849
- December 1849
