= The Boat Race 1857 =

14th Boat Race
- Date: 4 April 1857
- Winner: Oxford
- Margin of victory: 11 lengths
- Winning time: 22 minutes 50 seconds
- Overall record (Cambridge–Oxford): 8–6
- Umpire: Joseph William Chitty (Oxford)

The 14th Boat Race took place on the River Thames on 4 April 1857. Held annually, The Boat Race is a side-by-side rowing race between crews from the Universities of Oxford and Cambridge. Oxford rowed in a keel-less carvel-built boat, the first time in the history of the race that such a construction method was used for one of the vessels. Umpired by Joseph William Chitty, the race was won by Oxford who triumphed over Cambridge by 11 lengths.

== Background ==
Our boat was built by Matthew Taylor of Newcastle-on-Tyne, and a beauty she was, 55ft. long, 25 in. broad, in fact quite eclipsing in speed all boats turned out of late years by Searle or any southern builder.

— A. P. Lonsdale's description of the Oxford University's new vessel

The Boat Race is a side-by-side rowing competition between the University of Oxford (sometimes referred to as the "Dark Blues") and the University of Cambridge (sometimes referred to as the "Light Blues"). The race was first held in 1829, and since 1845 has taken place on the 4.2-mile (6.8 km) Championship Course on the River Thames in southwest London. Cambridge went into the race as reigning champions, having defeated Oxford by half-a-length in the previous year's race. They led overall with eight wins to Oxford's five.

It was the first race to feature a keel-less carvel-built boat. Purchased personally by Oxford boat club president Arthur Heywood-Lonsdale from Newcastle boat builder Matthew Taylor, the Oxford crew rowed a practice time of 19 minutes 50 seconds in it, considered "remarkable" in a boat with fixed seats. Lonsdale engaged Taylor to instruct Oxford how to "send his boat along as quickly as possible", avoiding connotations of professional coaching which was banned in the Boat Race. Cambridge rowed in a boat built by Salter of Wandsworth. It was also the first race in which both crews rowed with round loom oars.

Oxford "soon showed signs of good pace" in practice and set the course record with 19 minutes 50 seconds, a time which would remain unbeaten until the 1873 race. Cambridge began their practice rows "very late". The race was umpired by Joseph William Chitty who had rowed for Oxford twice in 1849 (in the March and December races) and the 1852 race.

== Crews ==
Oxford saw four crew members return from the 1856 race in Gurdon, Lonsdale, Thorley and the cox, Elers, while Cambridge welcomed back just two former Blues in Lloyd and Snow. Oxford were marginally the heavier crew at an average of just over 11 st 9 lb (73.8 kg) per rower, about 1 pound (0.5 kg) more on average than Cambridge. The Oxford president, Heywood-Lonsdale, rowed at number seven while his counterpart, R. Lloyd, rowed at six for the Light Blues.

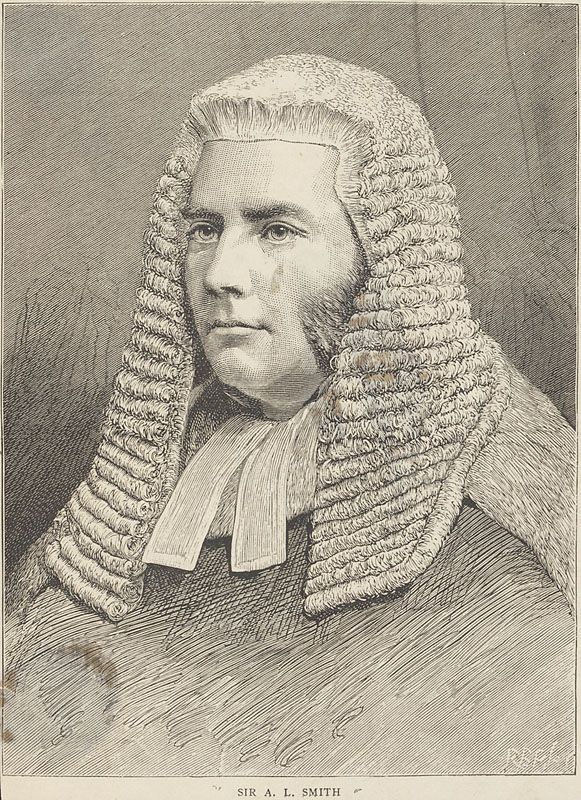
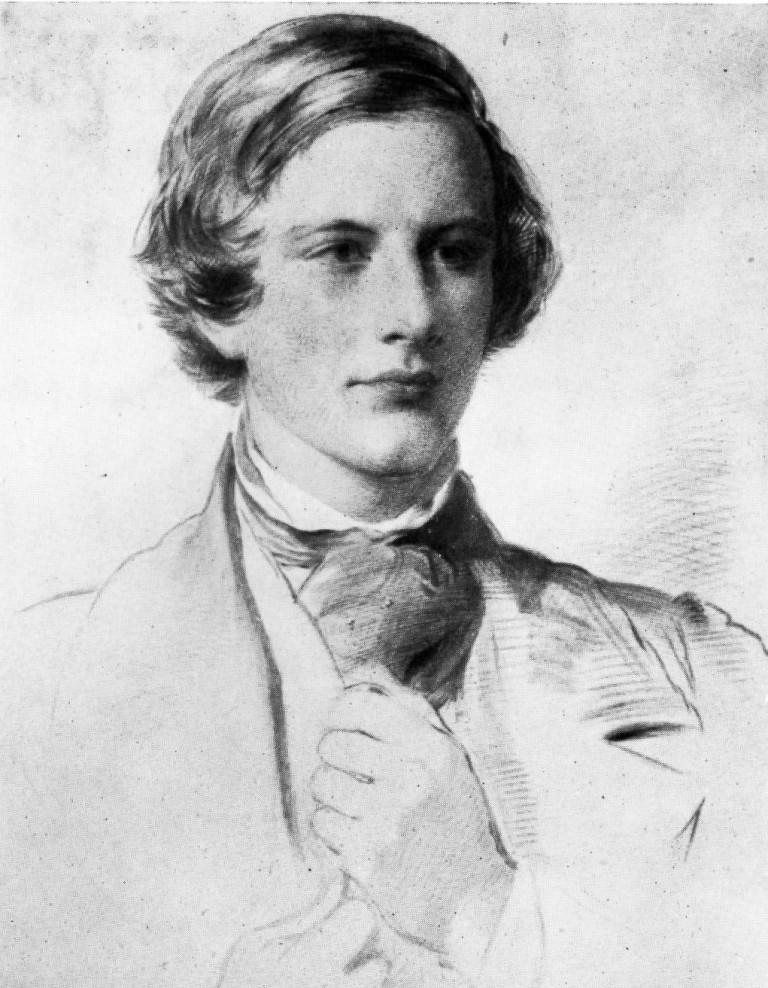
Archibald Levin Smith (left) occupied the four seat for Cambridge while Edmond Warre (right) rowed at number six for Oxford.

Seat	Cambridge			Oxford		
Seat	Name	College	Weight	Name	College	Weight
Bow	A. P. Holme	2nd Trinity	11 st 8 lb	R. Wells Risley	Exeter	11 st 3 lb
2	A. Benn	Emmanuel	11 st 5 lb	P. Gurdon	University	11 st 0 lb
3	W. H. Holley	Trinity Hall	11 st 8 lb	J. Arkell	Pembroke	12 st 10 lb
4	A. Levin Smith	1st Trinity	11 st 2 lb	J. Martin	Corpus Christi	12 st 1 lb
5	J. Jordan Serjeantson	1st Trinity	12 st 4 lb	W. Hardy Wood	University	11 st 13 lb
6	R. L. Lloyd (P)	Magdalene	11 st 11 lb	E. Warre	Balliol	12 st 3 lb
7	P. Pennant Pearson	Lady Margaret	11 st 4 lb	A. P. Lonsdale (P)	Balliol	12 st 0 lb
Stroke	Herbert Snow	Lady Margaret	11 st 8 lb	J. T. Thorley	Wadham	10 st 1 lb
Cox	R. Wharton	Magdalene	9 st 2 lb	F. W. Elers	Trinity	9 st 2 lb
Source: (P) – boat club president

== Race ==
The Championship Course, along which the race is conducted

Oxford won the toss and elected to start from the Middlesex station, leaving Cambridge with the Surrey station. Starting soon after 11 a.m., Oxford made a good start and at Searle's boathouse (originally home to the Leander Club) were clear of Cambridge. They increased their lead to a length by the time they had reached "The Crab Tree" pub. Despite Cambridge making a number of pushes to try to recover the deficit, Oxford continued to pull away and completed the course 32 seconds ahead of Cambridge, and eleven lengths clear. The winning time was 22 minutes 5 seconds. It was Oxford's fourth victory in the previous five races and represented the largest winning margin since the 1841 race. It was described in the Oxford Books' account as "without doubt ... about the most hollow beating ever given to Cambridge by Oxford."
