= Frank Henry Mason =

British artist (1875–1965)

- Born: Frank Henry Algernon Mason; 1 October 1875; Seaton Carew, County Durham, England
- Died: 24 February 1965 (aged 89)
- Education: Scarborough College of Art
- Known for: Painting, Drawing, Etching
- Movement: light impressionist, art deco, Orientalism
- Elected: RBA, RI, RSMA
- Patrons: GNR, GWR, LMS, NER, LNER, UERL
- Website: Frank Henry Mason

Frank Henry Mason (1 October 1875 – 24 February 1965), RBA, RI, RSMA was an English artist best known for his maritime, shipping, coastal and harbour paintings, and as a creator of art deco travel and railway posters. His style is described as "light impressionist" and he was a founder member of the Staithes Art Club whose members are known today as the Staithes group of artists, or the Northern Impressionists.

== Early life ==
Mason was born Frank Henry Algernon Mason in Seaton Carew, Hartlepool, County Durham, England on 1 October 1875, the son of a railway clerk. He was educated between 1880 and 1882 as a cadet at the naval school ship HMS Conway at Birkenhead.

On leaving HMS Conway, Mason spent time at sea then trained with Parsons as a marine engineer for steam powered ships working at Hartlepool, Leeds and Scarborough, eventually settling in Scarborough around about 1894.

== Career ==
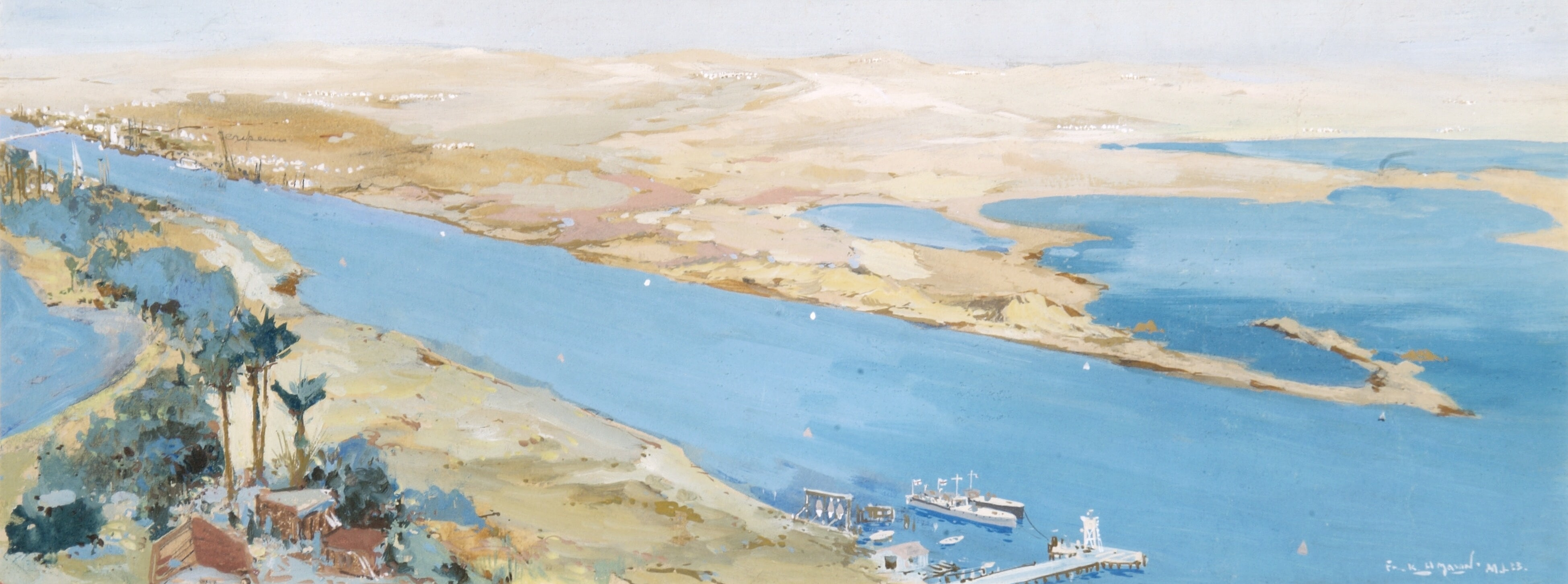
The Suez Canal. 28 April 1916 - from the crow's nest of Deversoir Signal Station

Mason had been interested in drawing but had no formal training in art. There was however a strong artistic community in Scarborough at the time. He studied at the Scarborough School of Art with Albert Strange and made regular trips to Staithes to meet and socialise with the arts community there. By 1890 his work had advanced to the point where he received commissions from art dealers, and around 1898 he decided to quit marine engineering and take up art full-time. In 1901 he became a founding member of the Staithes Art Club. He married his wife Edith in 1899.

He had lived at Blenheim Terrace in Scarborough but relocated the short distance to lodgings in North Marine Road. During the First World War, Mason was appointed shipping war artist in the RNVR as lieutenant in command of a Motor Launch in the North Sea, and Egypt. The Imperial War Museum holds 56 of his paintings from this period. On returning from the war, Mason worked with the community at Ebberston Hall near Scarborough and he travelled abroad extensively undertaking an extended European tour. He painted many subjects generally in water colour. During the 1920s and 1930s he designed poster artwork for Great Northern Railway, Great Western Railway, London, Midland and Scottish Railway, North Eastern Railway, London and North Eastern Railway, British Rail and Underground Group railway companies and ocean liner companies.

Mason was elected to the Royal Society of British Artists in 1904 and elected to the Royal Institute of Painters in Water Colours in 1929. He was an early member of the Society of Graphic Art and exhibited with them in 1921.

== Work ==
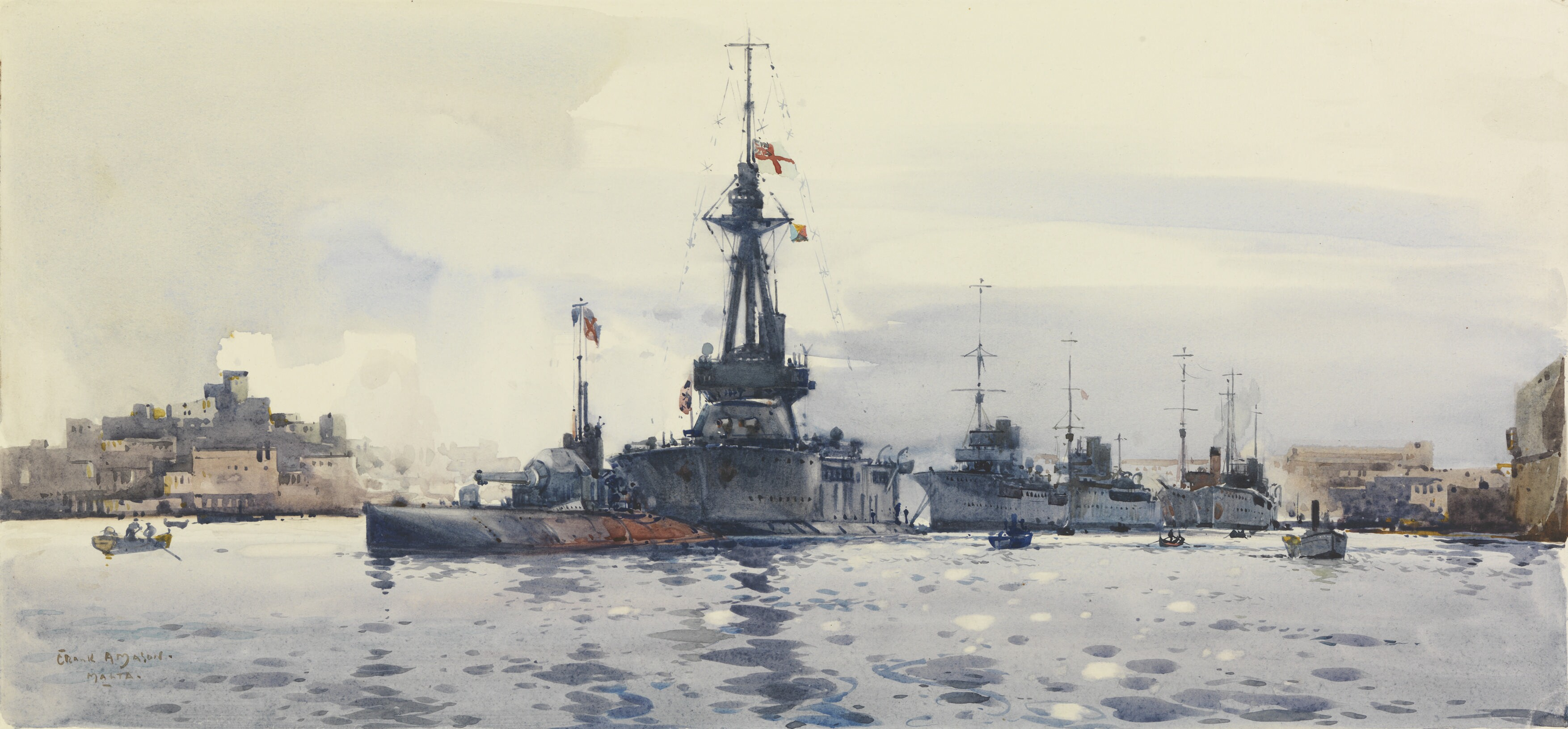
Dockyard Creek, Malta - Submarine M1, Monitor 'Abercrombie' and Fleet Messengers

Mason had exhibitions of his work at the Royal Academy from 1902 onwards. His work was part of the painting event in the art competition at the 1932 Summer Olympics. His work has been included in an exhibition in Liverpool and in 1973 there was an exhibition of his work at the National Maritime Museum. As well as the Imperial War Museum, Mason's work can be found in numerous galleries around the country – at Cartwright Hall Bradford, in Dundee, Hartlepool Art Gallery, and at Whitby.

Mason wrote the book Ashore and Afloat (1929) about his water colour technique. With Fred Taylor, he wrote the book Water Colour Painting.
