= Fred Appleyard =

English painter

- Born: Fred Appleyard; 9 September 1874; Middlesbrough
- Died: 22 February 1963 (aged 88); Itchen Stoke, Alresford, Hampshire
- Known for: Painter

Fred Appleyard (1874 – 1963) was a British artist known for his landscape paintings, portraits, classical subjects and allegorical compositions. He had 41 works exhibited during his lifetime by the Royal Academy and painted the mural Spring Driving Out Winter in the Academy Restaurant.

Appleyard was born in Middlesbrough, England on 9 September 1874, the son of Isaac Appleyard, an iron merchant. His uncle was the sculptor John Wormald Appleyard.

Having received his formal education at Scarborough, he attended Scarborough School of Art under the genre and landscape painter Albert Strange. It was at the Scarborough School of Art that he met Harry Watson, and the two were to remain lifelong friends. He then proceeded to the National Art Training School at South Kensington, and from there to the Royal Academy Schools, which he entered on 27 July 1897 at the late age of twenty-two. He was recommended to the R.A. by John Sparkes. He was awarded the Turner Gold Medal, the Creswick Prize for landscape, the Landseer Scholarship and others.

A Haunt of Ancient Peace (RA, 1910)

He carried out mural decorations for the Royal Academy Refreshment Room in 1903, St Mark's, North Audley Street, two large paintings in Nottingham General Hospital and Church of St Peter and Paul, Pickering, Yorkshire. He worked in South Africa from 1910 to 1912. During the 1914–1918 war he worked at the Woolwich Arsenal. He exhibited at the R.A. from 1900 to 1935 and the R.W.A. from 1918 until 1954.

He was a painter of subject pictures, landscapes, portraits and allegorical compositions of a decorative kind associated with English Impressionism. He exhibited widely during his lifetime, at the Royal Academy (forty-one works), the Walker Art Gallery, Liverpool, (thirteen works), and the Glasgow Institute of Fine Arts. He was at one time a regular exhibitor at The Royal Academy of both oil paintings and watercolours and at the Royal West of England Academy of which he was elected a member in 1926. Much of Fred Appleyard's work had a decorative inclination and he executed several wall paintings, including "Spring Driving Away Winter" over the door of the Refreshment Room at the Royal Academy which was commissioned by the President and Council.

Moonrise and Memories (RA, 1918)

He is represented at The Tate Gallery by an oil painting entitled A Secret, a Chantrey Bequest purchase from The Royal Academy Exhibition of 1915. His works are represented in museums at the Victoria Art Gallery, Bath, in Bristol, Rochdale and Grahamstown, South Africa. The painting Old Walls is in the Mansion House in Doncaster.

Fred Appleyard is known chiefly for his scenes depicting families of obviously substantial means in outdoor settings, often incorporating ruins in his compositions. He used a dappling technique which was ideally suited to his frequent depiction of sunlight broken through trees. He was also fond of incorporating children into his work.

It was after the First World War, where he worked at the Woolwich Arsenal, that the big change in his life took place. In 1918 he left London and settled in the Hampshire village of Itchen Stoke, near Alresford, Hampshire, where he lived for 45 years as a true artist despising money and fame. He let his large country house to fishermen from the Stock Exchange to pay his rates and sold his Turner Gold Medal to get electricity installed in the house, while Fred moved into the adjacent barn studio.

Lay Not Thine Hand Upon The Lad (RA, 1913)

Appleyard died at Itchen Stoke on 22 February 1963, and is buried at the back of the St Mary's Church, Itchen Stoke graveyard.

He was the brother-in-law of fellow artist Christopher Williams.

One of Appleyard's paintings is featured in Season 1 Episode 12 of TV series The Repair Shop.

In 2024 Hampshire Cultural Trust is holding a retrospective of the work of Fred Appleyard to commemorate the 150th anniversary of his birth entitled "Rising Splendour: Fred Appleyard from the Royal Academy to the Itchen Valley" The Exhibition took place at The Arc in Winchester from June 21 to September 18. The exhibition includes a first ever catalogue of his work

A version of the exhibition will subsequently be held in Gosport Museum and Art Gallery from 26 October 2024 to 18 January 2025.

== Resources ==
- Twentieth Century Painters and Sculptors. By Frances Spalding. Suffolk, England: Antique Collectors' Club, 1990.
