= Sheila (yacht) =

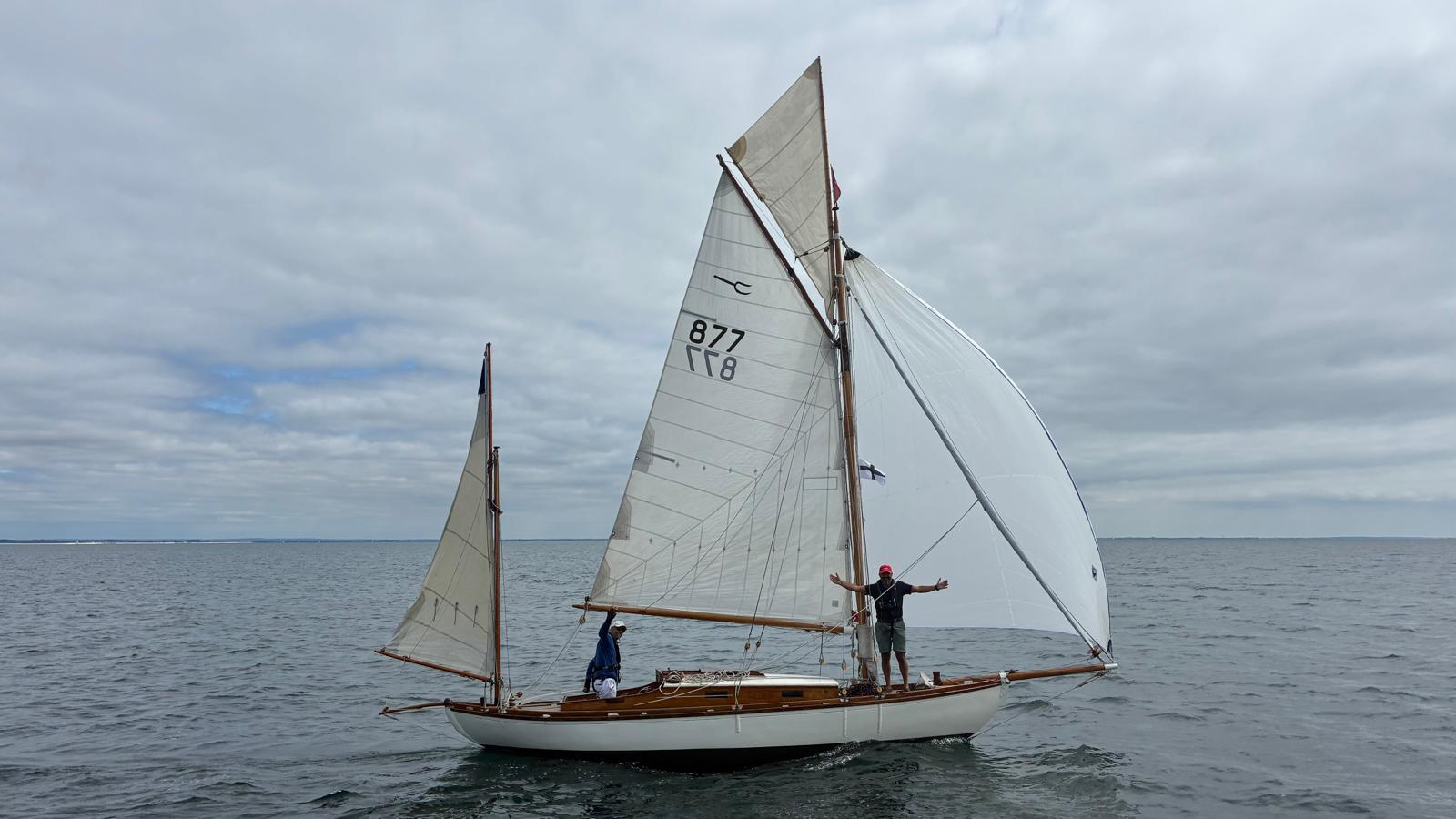

Development
- Designer: Albert Strange
- Year: 1905
- No. built: 1
- Design: Design 70
- Builder: R Cain - Isle Of Man
- Role: Coastal cruising
- Name: Sheila

Boat
- Displacement: 2,700 kg (6,000 lb)
- Draft: 1.0 m (3 ft 05 in)

Hull
- LOA: 9.4 m (31 ft)
- LWL: 5.9 m (19 ft 6 in)
- Beam: 2.1 m (6 ft 09 in)
- Engine: None

Rig
- Rig type: Gaff

Sails
- Sailplan: Yawl

Sheila is a wooden canoe yawl designed by the English artist and yacht designer Albert Strange and built in 1905 on the Isle of Man. She is generally cited as the oldest surviving Strange-designed yacht still in commission.

== Design and construction ==
Sheila was drawn up by Strange in 1903 as design No. 70, a canoe-sterned yawl commissioned by the artist Robert E. Groves, a pioneer of small-boat coastal cruising. The boat was reportedly named after Groves's eldest daughter. She was built by the boatbuilder Robert Cain at Port St Mary on the Isle of Man, and launched in 1905.

The hull is planked in Pensacola pitch-pine on grown oak frames set at three-foot centres, with steam-bent intermediate timbers on an oak backbone. As built, she measured 31 ft 0 in (9.45 m) length overall, 19 ft 6 in (5.94 m) on the waterline, with a beam of 6 ft 9 in (2.06 m) and a draft of 3 ft 5 in (1.04 m), carrying about 330 square feet of sail on a yawl rig. Strange's original drawings reportedly labelled the design a "canoe-yacht" and did not show a mizzen mast, suggesting the yawl rig may have been settled on after the initial plans were drawn. Detailed plans of the vessel are held in the W. P. Stephens Collection at the Mystic Seaport Museum library in Connecticut, United States.

== Service history ==
Groves used Sheila for extended coastal cruises considered ambitious for so small a boat at the time, including voyages to the Hebrides, the west coast of Scotland, and Ireland. In 1914 the yacht sank in Dublin and was subsequently written off by insurers; she was bought and rebuilt by Captain Patrick Walsh of Dublin, who deepened her keel by about five inches and fitted a swept deck of kauri pine. She was damaged again by wartime bombing at Ayr, Scotland, in 1942, and has since been restored on further occasions.

Over her history Sheila has passed through roughly a dozen owners, or "guardians", each of whom has maintained or restored her. Boatbuilder and restorer Mike Burn cared for the yacht for around three decades. Sheila has more recently been based in France, where she continues to be sailed on her original gear, without an engine, winches, or electronics.

The yacht is defended by the Albert Strange Association, which holds regular meets for Strange-designed craft, and has been featured in sailing publications including Classic Boat and Voiles et Voiliers.

== See also ==
- Albert Strange
- Tally Ho (yacht)
