= Frances Crawshaw =

British artist (1876–1968)

- Born: Frances Fisher; 1876; Manchester, England
- Died: 1968 (aged 91–92)
- Education: Scarborough School of Art; Westminster School of Art
- Known for: Painting, botanical art

Frances Crawshaw (née Frances Fisher; September 1876 – 1968) was a British painter in oils and watercolours as well as a botanical artist.

== Biography ==
Crawshaw was born in Manchester and grew up at Sewerby on the Yorkshire coast where her father, Robert Fisher, was a vicar. She attended the Scarborough School of Art and the Westminster School of Art in London and also studied art in Milan, Paris and Edinburgh. During her life, Crawshaw lived at Whitby in North Yorkshire, Edinburgh, Droitwich and latterly at Newton Abbot in Devon. She painted flowers and landscapes in both oil and watercolours and during the 1930s exhibited regularly with the Royal Scottish Academy, the Royal Scottish Watercolour Society and the Royal Glasgow Institute of the Fine Arts. She also exhibited at the Royal Academy in London, with the New English Art Club, the Women's International Art Club and was elected an associate member of the Royal Birmingham Society of Artists. Crawshaw also illustrated two books on British flowers written by her father.

Crawshaw's first husband died in 1903 after three years of marriage and her second husband was the Staithes group artist Lionel Townsend Crawshaw, (1864–1949), with whom she settled in Devon and where she died in 1968.
