= List of shipwrecks in August 1833 =

The list of shipwrecks in August 1833 includes ships sunk, foundered, grounded, or otherwise lost during August 1833.

== 2 August ==
List of shipwrecks: 2 August 1833
Ship	State	Description
Cephalus	United Kingdom	The ship was wrecked in the River Tees. Her crew were rescued by the Seaton Lifeboat. She was on a voyage from Stockton-on-Tees, County Durham to London.

== 3 August ==
List of shipwrecks: 3 August 1833
Ship	State	Description
Pallas	Hamburg	The ship was wrecked in the River Plate. She was on a voyage from Hamburg to Montevideo, Uruguay.

== 6 August ==
List of shipwrecks: 6 August 1833
Ship	State	Description
Evergreen	United Kingdom	The ship was wrecked on the Grand Castillos, off the coast of Uruguay. She was on a voyage from Liverpool, Lancashire to Buenos Aires, Argentina.

== 7 August ==
List of shipwrecks: 7 August 1833
Ship	State	Description
Oscar	United Kingdom	The ship was driven ashore at Barben Point, in the Dardanelles. She was refloated in late August and taken in to Constantinople, Ottoman Empire.

== 9 August ==
List of shipwrecks: 9 August 1833
Ship	State	Description
Ocean	United Kingdom	The ship departed from Blakeney, Norfolk for Christiansand, Norway. No further trace, presumed foundered with the loss of all hands.

== 10 August ==
List of shipwrecks: 10 August 1833
Ship	State	Description
Elizabeth	(United Kingdom of Great Britain and Ireland) British North America	The ship was lost at Petty Harbour, Newfoundland. She was on a voyage from Hamburg to Saint John's, Newfoundland.
Planter	United Kingdom	The brig was wrecked on the coast of Prince Edward Island. Her crew were rescued. She was on a voyage from Miramichi, New Brunswick to Newfoundland.
Two Brothers	United States	The schooner was driven ashore on Pointe de Roche, Newfoundland.

== 12 August ==
List of shipwrecks: 12 August 1833
Ship	State	Description
Bella	Kingdom of Sardinia	The ship was wrecked in the River Plate. She was on a voyage from Genoa to Montevideo, Uruguay.
HDMS Pilen	Royal Danish Navy	The schooner capsized and sank in the Great Belt. Her crew were rescued. She was refloated on 14 August. Subsequently repaired and returned to service.
Essex	United Kingdom	The ship was destroyed by fire in the Atlantic Ocean. All on board survived. She was on a voyage from New Orleans, Louisiana, United States to Liverpool, Lancashire.
Violet	United Kingdom	The ship was wrecked on Borkum, Kingdom of Hanover with the loss of all but one of her crew. She was on a voyage from Newcastle upon Tyne, Northumberland to Hamburg.

== 15 August ==
List of shipwrecks: 15 August 1833
Ship	State	Description
Governor Maxwell	(United Kingdom of Great Britain and Ireland) Saint Kitts	The drogher was lost in a hurricane at Saint Kitts.
Royal William	United Kingdom	The schooner was lost in a hurricane at Saint Kitts.
Thomas	United Kingdom	The ship was destroyed by fire and the explosion of gunpowder on board at Hobart, Van Diemen's Land. There were no casualties amongst her passengers and crew.
Warkworth	United Kingdom	The ship ran aground at Tourville-sur-Sienne, Manche, France and was wrecked. She was on a voyage from Newcastle upon Tyne, Northumberland to Tourville-sur-Sienne.

== 16 August ==
List of shipwrecks: 16 August 1833
Ship	State	Description
Flamingo	United Kingdom	The ship was destroyed by fire off the Cape of Good Hope, Cape Colony.
St. Vincent	United Kingdom	The ship was wrecked at Bonny, Nigeria.

== 17 August ==
List of shipwrecks: 17 August 1833
Ship	State	Description
Anapa	flag unknown	The ship departed from Arkhangelsk, Russia for New York, United States. No further trace, presumed foundered with the loss of all hands.
Arsis (Арсис)	Imperial Russian Navy	The ship of the line ran aground near sv:Nämanland in the Baltic Sea, 14 nautical miles (26 km) southwest of Hanko Peninsula. Her crew were rescued. She was refloated on 21 August and towed first to sv:Kuggskär and by mid-September to Turku, Grand Duchy of Finland. Subsequently repaired and returned to service.

== 22 August ==
List of shipwrecks: 22 August 1833
Ship	State	Description
Blucher	United Kingdom	The ship foundered in the North Sea. Her crew were rescued by William (United Kingdom. Blucher was on a voyage from Newcastle upon Tyne, Northumberland to London.
Four Sodskene	Norway	The ship was wrecked on the Thistle Rocks. Her crew were rescued. She was on a voyage from Hull, Yorkshire, United Kingdom to Sundsvall.
Frau Johanna	Stralsund	The ship foundered 3.5 German miles off Møn, Denmark with the loss of all but one of her crew. The survivor was rescued by Aglal (flag unknown). Frau Johanna was on a voyage from Stralsund to Trondheim, Norway.
Gordon	United Kingdom	The sloop was driven ashore and wrecked at Blackpool, Lancashire with the loss of her captain. She was on a voyage from Liverpool, Lancashire to Dumfries.
Jean Sodskende	Sweden	The ship was wrecked near Gothenburg. She was on a voyage from Hull, Yorkshire, United Kingdom to Sundsvall.
Maria	Sweden	The ship was lost off Skagen, Denmark. She was on a voyage from Stockholm to a French port.
Science	United Kingdom	The ship was driven ashore and wrecked at Huna, Caithness.

== 23 August ==
List of shipwrecks: 23 August 1833
Ship	State	Description
Phœnix	United Kingdom	The ship was driven ashore at Memel, Prussia. She was on a voyage from London to Memel.
Prompt	United Kingdom	The ship was wrecked at the mouth of the River Plate with the loss of all but two of her crew. She was on a voyage from Liverpool, England to Buenos Aires, Argentina.

== 25 August ==
List of shipwrecks: 25 August 1833
Ship	State	Description
Smyrna	United Kingdom	The ship was departed from Maranhão, Brazil for Liverpool, Lancashire. No further trace, presumed foundered in the Atlantic Ocean with the loss of all hands.

=== 26 August ===
List of shipwrecks: 26 August 1833
Ship	State	Description
Franklin	United States	The steamship was destroyed by fire at Charleston, South Carolina.
Lark	United Kingdom	The ship departed from Hamburg for Hull, Yorkshire. No further trace, presumed foundered in the North Sea with the loss of all hands.

== 27 August ==
List of shipwrecks: 27 August 1833
Ship	State	Description
Ceres	United Kingdom	The ship was wrecked on Foula, Shetland Islands with the loss of all but one of her crew.
Science	United Kingdom	The ship was driven ashore and wrecked at Huna, Caithness. Her crew survived. She was on a voyage from Quebec City, Lower Canada, British North America to Sunderland, County Durham.
Tula	United Kingdom	The ship departed from South Shields, County Durham for the Charente, France. No further trace, presumed foundered with the loss of all hands.

== 28 August ==
List of shipwrecks: 28 August 1833
Ship	State	Description
Margaret	United Kingdom	The ship was driven ashore on Great Cumbrae. She was on a voyage from the Clyde to Saint John, New Brunswick.

== 29 August ==
List of shipwrecks: 29 August 1833
Ship	State	Description
Alchymist	United Kingdom	The ship departed from Newcastle upon Tyne, Northumberland for London. No further trace, presumed foundered in the North Sea with the loss of all hands.
Friends	United Kingdom	The ship departed from Newcastle upon Tyne for London. No further trace, presumed foundered in the North Sea with the loss of all hands.
Thomas	United Kingdom	The ship was wrecked near Lancaster, Lancashire with the loss of her captain. She was on a voyage from Tortola to Lancaster.
Westerhall	United Kingdom	The ship departed from Newcastle upon Tyne for London. No further trace, presumed foundered in the North Sea with the loss of all hands.
Wharfinger	United Kingdom	The sloop departed from Stockton on Tees, County Durham for London. No further trace, presumed foundered with the loss of all four crew.

=== 30 August ===
List of shipwrecks: 30 August 1833
Ship	State	Description
Bee	United Kingdom	The brig sprang a leak and foundered in the South China Sea off "Hueling Island", China with the loss of a crew member.
Beverley	United Kingdom	The barque was driven ashore at Leasowe, Cheshire. She was on a voyage from Saint John, New Brunswick, British North America to Liverpool, Lancashire. Beverley was refloated on 2 September.
Flora	United Kingdom	The ship was wrecked on the Maplin Sand, in the North Sea off the coast of Essex. Her crew were rescued.
Jane	United Kingdom	The ship was wrecked in St Bride's Bay.
Juno	United Kingdom	The ship, a brig or schooner, was abandoned in the North Sea off the coast of Essex. Her crew were taken off by James Watt (United Kingdom). The ship was subsequently driven ashore and wrecked at Filey.
Margaret	United Kingdom	The ship was departed from Newcastle upon Tyne for Aldeburgh, Suffolk. No further trace, presumed foundered in the North Sea with the loss of all hands.
Peggy	United Kingdom	The ship was wrecked in the River Dee. She was on a voyage from Wexford to Liverpool.
Perennial	United Kingdom	The ship departed from Sunderland for Bridlington, Yorkshire. She subsequently foundered in the North Sea off the coast of Yorkshire. The wreck was sighted on 3 September 3 nautical miles (5.6 km) off the Holderness coast.
Phœbus	United Kingdom	The ship was abandoned in the North Sea off the coast of Essex. Her crew were rescued by Speedwell (United Kingdom).
Preston	United Kingdom	The ship departed from Guernsey, Channel Islands for Rochester, Kent. No further trace, presumed foundered with the loss of all hands.
Scarborough	United Kingdom	The ship departed from South Shields, County Durham for Worthing, Sussex. No further trace, presumed foundered with the loss of all hands.
Thomas	United Kingdom	The ship was driven ashore and wrecked at Sunderland Point Lancashire. There was at least one survivor. She was on a voyage from Tortola to Lancaster, Lancashire.

== 31 August ==
List of shipwrecks: 31 August 1833
Ship	State	Description
Advance	United Kingdom	The ship was driven ashore at Cromer, Norfolk. All eleven people on board were rescued. Advance was refloated on 3 October and taken in to Wells-next-the-Sea, Norfolk.
Agenora	United Kingdom	The fishing lugger was driven ashore and wrecked south of Scarborough, Yorkshire.
Aimable Julie	France	The sloop was driven ashore 4 leagues (12 nautical miles (22 km) from Boulogne, Pas-de-Calais. Her three crew were rescued. She was on a voyage from Honfleur, Calvados to Dunkirk, Nord.
Albion	United Kingdom	The ship was driven ashore at Thornham, Norfolk. She was on a voyage from Boston, Lincolnshire to London.
Albion	United Kingdom	The ship was driven ashore and wrecked on the coast of Yorkshire. Her crew were rescued.
Alert	United Kingdom	The pilot cutter was driven ashore at Spurn Point, Yorkshire. Her crew were rescued by the Spurn Lifeboat.
Alfred	United Kingdom	The brig foundered in the North Sea off Whitby, Yorkshire with the loss of all hands.
Alfred	United Kingdom	The Thames barge foundered off Sheerness, Kent. Her crew were rescued. She was on a voyage from Chatham, Kent to Deptford, Kent.
Amicus	United Kingdom	The ship sank at King's Lynn, Norfolk. Her crew were rescued.
Amphitrite	United Kingdom	Amphitrite The convict ship was driven ashore and wrecked at Boulogne with the loss of 133 of the 136 people on board. She was on a voyage from Woolwich, Kent to New South Wales.
Amity	United Kingdom	The schooner was driven ashore at Sandhale, Lincolnshire with the loss of two lives.
Andrew and Margaret	United Kingdom	The ship was driven ashore near Bideford, Devon. Her crew were rescued. She was on a voyage from Maryport, Cumberland to Cardiff, Glamorgan.
Ann	United Kingdom	The fishing smack was driven ashore and wrecked south of Scarborough.
Ann and Amelia	British East India Company	The East Indiaman was driven ashore and wrecked at Berck, Pas-de-Calais with the loss of four of her 30 crew. She was on a voyage from Calcutta, India to London.
Ann and Susannah	United Kingdom	The ship was driven ashore and wrecked at Robin Hoods Bay, Yorkshire. Her crew were rescued.
Aquatic	United Kingdom	The ship was driven ashore near Grimsby, Lincolnshire. She was on a voyage from Rotterdam, South Holland, Netherlands to Hull. Yorkshire. Aquatic was refloated on 16 September and taken in to Hull.
Ardincaple	United Kingdom	The paddle steamer was driven ashore at North Sunderland, County Durham with the loss of all hands, her passengers having been taken off at sea. She was on a voyage from Leith, Lothian to Sunderland. Ardincaple was later brought in to Sunderland. She was subsequently repaired and returned to service.
Augustus	Netherlands	The ship was driven ashore and wrecked at Calais, France with the loss of seven of her thirteen crew. She was on a voyage from Surinam to Amsterdam, North Holland.
Aurora	United Kingdom	The ship was driven ashore at Cley-next-the-Sea, Norfolk. All on board were rescued. She was on a voyage from Plymouth, Devon to Saint Petersburg, Russia.
Barbara	United Kingdom	The ship foundered in the North Sea with the loss of all hands.
Bellona	United Kingdom	The ship was driven ashore west of Wells-next-the-Sea. Her crew were rescued.
Betsey	United Kingdom	The ship was driven ashore and wrecked near Hornsea, Yorkshire with the loss of all but one of her crew.
Chance	United Kingdom	The ship was driven ashore and wrecked at Speeton, Yorkshire. Her crew were rescued
Charlotte	United Kingdom	The schooner was wrecked on the Goodwin Sands, Kent. Her crew were rescued. She was on a voyage from Hull to Antwerp, Belgium.
Cleveland	United Kingdom	The ship was driven ashore at Grimsby. She was later refloated.
Coaster	United Kingdom	The ship was wrecked near Happisburgh, Norfolk with the loss of all hands.
Couziot	France	The sloop was driven ashore and wrecked at Dunkirk. Her six crew were rescued. She was on a voyage from Sunderland, County Durham to Bordeaux, Gironde.
David	United Kingdom	The ship was driven ashore near Bude. Cornwall. She was refloated on 14 September and taken in to Bude.
De Blyde	Netherlands	The ship was driven ashore at Sandhale. Her crew were rescued. She was on a voyage from Sunderland to Amsterdam, North Holland.
Diana	United Kingdom	The fishing lugger was driven ashore and wrecked at Scarborough and was wrecked. Her crew were rescued.
Dorothy	United Kingdom	The ship was driven ashore and wrecked at Speeton with the loss of all but one of her crew.
Dove	United Kingdom	The Thames barge was driven ashore at Swalecliffe, Kent.
Eagle	United Kingdom	The ship was driven ashore and wrecked at Bridlington, Yorkshire. Her crew were rescued.
Ebenezer	United Kingdom	The ship was driven ashore and wrecked at Padstow, Cornwall. Her crew were rescued.
Economy	United Kingdom	The ship was driven ashore between Blakeney, Norfolk and Wells-next-the-Sea.
Elizabeth	United Kingdom	The ship was driven ashore near Grimsby. Her crew were rescued.
Endeavour	United Kingdom	The ship was driven ashore at Sheringham, Norfolk.
Fairy	United Kingdom	The ship was wrecked on the Holme Sand, in the River Humber. Her crew were rescued. She was on a voyage from Newcastle upon Tyne, Northumberland to Gainsborough, Lincolnshire.
Faith	United Kingdom	The ship foundered in the North Sea with the loss of all hands.
Fanny	United Kingdom	The ship was driven ashore and wrecked at Salthouse, Norfolk. Her crew were rescued. She was on a voyage from Colchester, Essex to Sunderland
Feronia	United Kingdom	The ship foundered in the North Sea with the loss of all hands.
Flora	United Kingdom	The ship was driven ashore at Mawgan Porth, Cornwall. Her crew were rescued. Flora was refloated on 13 September and taken in to Padstow, Cornwall.
Friends	United Kingdom	The ship foundered in the North Sea off the coast of Yorkshire.
Goede Verwachting	Netherlands	The ship was abandoned in The Wash. She subsequently drove ashore on 1 September at Snettisham, Norfolk.
Good Intent	United Kingdom	The Thames barge was abandoned in the North Sea off the coast of Essex. Her crew were rescued by the peter boat Capel (United Kingdom.
Grasshopper	United Kingdom	The Thames barge foundered off Sheerness. Her crew were rescued. She was on a voyage from London to Faversham, Kent.
Guensing	United Kingdom	The sloop was wrecked off Holywell, Sussex with the loss of a crew member.
Harmony	United Kingdom	The brig was driven ashore and wrecked at Skegness, Lincolnshire. Her crew were rescued by the Skegness Lifeboat.
Hebe	United Kingdom	The yacht was driven ashore and wrecked at Aberystwyth, Cardiganshire with the loss of at least one life.
Hendrike	Netherlands	The galiot was driven ashore at Sandhale. Her crew were rescued, but the captain's wife perished. She was on a voyage from Sunderland to Amsterdam.
Henry	United Kingdom	The ship was driven ashore at Cley-next-the-Sea. Her crew were rescued
Henry and Elizabeth	United Kingdom	The sloop was driven ashore and wrecked at Mablethorpe, Lincolnshire. Her crew were rescued.
Henry and Harriet	United Kingdom	The ship was driven ashore near Blakeney, Norfolk.
Hermione	United Kingdom	The brig was wrecked at Sandhale with the loss of four of her eight crew.
Hero	United Kingdom	The ship was driven ashore at Gorleston, Suffolk. Her crew were rescued.
Hilda	United Kingdom	The ship was driven ashore and severely damaged at Ingoldmells, Lincolnshire. Her crew were rescued. She was on a voyage from London to Stockton-on-Tees, County Durham.
Hilden	United Kingdom	The brig was driven ashore at Huttoft, Lincolnshire. Her crew were rescued.
Hull	United Kingdom	The ship was driven ashore on the Holderness coast, Yorkshire. She was on a voyage from Antwerp, Belgium to Leith, Lothian.
Hubert	United Kingdom	The Thames barge wrecked near the Neyland Rock, off Margate, Kent.
Isle	United Kingdom	The ship foundered in the Humber. Loss of all hands presumed.
Jane	United Kingdom	The ship was wrecked in Bride's Bay, Milford Haven, Pembrokeshire.
Jane and Catherine	United Kingdom	The sloop was wrecked at Whitehaven, Cumberland. Her crew were rescued.
Jason	United Kingdom	The ship was driven ashore at Hunstanton, Norfolk. She was on a voyage from Boston to London.
Jeune Celine	France	The brig was driven ashore and wrecked at Dunkirk. All thirteen people on board were rescued.
John	United Kingdom	The ship was driven ashore near King's Lynn. She was on a voyage from Blyth, Northumberland to Dover, Kent.
Lady Andover	United Kingdom	The brig foundered in the North Sea off Sandhale with the loss of all hands.
Lark	United Kingdom	The ship was driven ashore at Filey. Her crew were rescued. She was on a voyage from Sunderland to Bridlington, Yorkshire.
Liberty	United Kingdom	The ship was driven ashore at Terrington St John, Norfolk.
Lively's Increase	United Kingdom	The ship was driven ashore and wrecked near Scarborough. Her crew were rescued by the Scarborough Lifeboat.
Lucy and Mary	United Kingdom	The ship was driven ashore near King's Lynn. She was on a voyage from Wisbech, Cambridgeshire to Sunderland.
Margaret	United Kingdom	The ship foundered in The Wash off King's Lynn with the loss of all hands.
Mary	United Kingdom	The ship was driven ashore near Hornsea. She was on a voyage from Alnmouth, Northumberland to Hull.
Mary	United Kingdom	The ship foundered in the North Sea off Bridlington. Her crew were rescued.
Mary	United Kingdom	The sloop was driven ashore, caught fire and was destroyed at Whitehaven. Her crew were rescued.
Mayflower	United Kingdom	The ship was driven ashore and wrecked near King's Lynn with the loss of her captain.
Medway	United Kingdom	The Thames barge foundered off Sheerness. Her crew were rescued.
Merchant	United Kingdom	The schooner foundered off the Goodwin Sands. Her crew survived. She was on a voyage from Stettin, Prussia to London.
Mermino	United Kingdom	The ship was driven ashore and wrecked at Saltfleet with the loss of three of her crew.
Neptune	United Kingdom	The brig foundered off King's Lynn with the loss of all hands.
Newcastle	United Kingdom	The ship was driven ashore at Sheringham.
Nimrod	United Kingdom	The steamship was driven ashore at Grimsby. She was on a voyage from Great Yarmouth, Norfolk to Hull
Norfolk	United Kingdom	The ship was driven ashore at Runton or Beeston, Norfolk. Her crew were rescued.
Ocean	United Kingdom	The ship departed from Christiansand, Norway ro Cley-next-the-Sea, Norfolk. No further trace, presumed foundered with the loss of all hands.
Peace	United Kingdom	The ship was driven ashore near King's Lynn. She was on a voyage from Rochester, Kent to Sunderland.
Perseverance	United Kingdom	The ship was driven ashore and wrecked on The Spaw, Scarborough. Her crew were rescued by rocket apparatus. She was on a voyage from Blyth, Northumberland to Scarborough.
Phœnix	United Kingdom	The ship was driven ashore at Boulogne. She was on a voyage from Deal, Kent to London.
Planter	United Kingdom	The brig capsized, was driven ashore and was wrecked on Prince Edward Island, British North America.
Platoff	United Kingdom	The ship foundered off Sandwich, Kent. Her crew were rescued. She was on a voyage from Sunderland, County Durham to Sandwich.
Ponsonby	United Kingdom	The ship was wrecked near Wilsthorpe, Yorkshire with the loss of three of her crew. She was on a voyage from Sunderland to London.
Providence	United Kingdom	The ship was driven ashore on the Isle of Sheppey, Kent. She was on a voyage from London to Ramsgate, Kent
Ranger	United Kingdom	The ship was wrecked on the Goodwin Sands. Her crew were rescued. She was on a voyage from Caen, Calvados, France to Sunderland. Ranger was taken in to Dover, Kent on 3 September.
Reaper	United Kingdom	The ship was driven ashore at Filey. Her crew were rescued.
Regard	United Kingdom	The ship was driven ashore at Runton.
Rising Star	United Kingdom	The ship was driven ashore and wrecked at Cley-next-the-Sea. Her crew were rescued.
Rising Sun	United Kingdom	The ship was driven ashore at Sheringham.
Ruby	United Kingdom	The ship was driven ashore and wrecked on the coast of Yorkshire.
Suffolk	United Kingdom	The ship was driven ashore and capsized at King's Lynn.
Swift	United Kingdom	The brig was driven ashore and wrecked at Ingoldmells with the loss of all nine crew.
Swift	United Kingdom	The sloop was wrecked on the Dutchman Sandbank, at the entrance to the Menai Strait with the loss of all hands. she was on a voyage from Strangford, County Down to Liverpool, Lancashire.
Tay	United Kingdom	The ship was driven ashore at Lowestoft, Suffolk.
Thetis	(United Kingdom of Great Britain and Ireland) Guernsey	The brig foundered in the North Sea off North Foreland, Kent. Her crew were rescued. She was on a voyage from Jersey, Channel Islands to London.
Trafalgar	United Kingdom	The ship was driven ashore and wrecked at Skinningrove, Yorkshire.
Trimmer	United Kingdom	The ship was driven ashore and wrecked at Staithes, Yorkshire.
Two Brothers	(United Kingdom of Great Britain and Ireland) British North America	The schooner was driven ashore and wrecked on Prince Edward Island.
Twey Wanner	Kingdom of Hanover	The ship departed from Cuxhaven for Gothenburg, Sweden. No further trace, presumed foundered with the loss of all hands.
Tyne	United Kingdom	The ship was driven ashore and wrecked west of Wells-next-the-Sea with the loss of all hands.
Union	United Kingdom	The snack foundered off the mouth of the Voryd River, Flintshire with the loss of all hands. She was on a voyage from Liverpool to Caernarfon.
Vectis	United Kingdom	The ship was driven ashore near Sheerness. She was on a voyage from London to Saint Helena. Vectis was refloated in mid-September and taken in to Sheerness for repairs.
Venelia	United Kingdom	The ship was driven ashore at Sheringham.
Venus	United Kingdom	The pilot boat was driven ashore near King's Lynn.
Waterloo	United Kingdom	The ship foundered off King's Lynn. Her crew were rescued by a fishing boat.
Wellington	United Kingdom	The brig foundered in the Humber. Her crew were rescued. She was on a voyage from Wels-next-the-Sea to Goole, Yorkshire.
Wey Packet	United Kingdom	The ship was driven ashore near Saltfleet. Her crew were rescued. She was on a voyage from London to Sunderland.
Wilna	United Kingdom	The Thames barge was driven ashore on the Isle of Sheppey. She was later refloated.
Wilna	United Kingdom	The schooner foundered in the North Sea off Scarborough.

== Unknown date ==
List of shipwrecks: Unknown date 1833
Ship	State	Description
Agnes	United Kingdom	The ship was wrecked in the Torres Strait with the loss of a crew member. Survivors were rescued by Persian (flag unknown). She was on a voyage from Sydney to the Île de France.
Alchymist	United Kingdom	The ship departed from South Shields, County Durham before 1 September. No further trace, presumed foundered in the North Sea with the loss of all hands.
Amis	France	The ship was wrecked on Little Heneaga Island. She was on a voyage from Savanilla, near Puerto Colombia, to Martinique.
Cumberland	United Kingdom	The ship was departed from North Shields before 1 September. No further trace, presumed foundered in the North Sea with the loss of all hands.
Defiance	(United Kingdom of Great Britain and Ireland) New South Wales	The schooner was lost in the Bass Strait.
Defiance	(United Kingdom of Great Britain and Ireland) New South Wales	The schooner was wrecked in the Bass Strait.
Eudora	British East India Company	The brig was lost at Cuttack, India before 5 August. She was on a voyage from Bengal, India to Mauritius.
Exeter	United Kingdom	The brig caught fire at Cuxhaven and was scuttled. She was on a voyage from Hamburg to Newfoundland, British North America.
Harmony	United Kingdom	The ship was abandoned off Scaterie Island, Nova Scotia, British North America before 23 August. She was on a voyage from Memel, Prussia to Pictou, Nova Scotia.
Hope	(United Kingdom of Great Britain and Ireland) British North America	The ship was driven ashore and wrecked on "Langlois Island". Her crew were rescued. She was on a voyage from Sydney, Nova Scotia to Newfoundland.
Industry	British East India Company	The ship was lost on the Long Sand, off the coast of India in early August.
Mary Ann	United Kingdom	The ship was abandoned in the White Sea before 16 August.
Ormrod	United Kingdom	The steamship was driven ashore near Grimsby, Lincolnshire. She was on a voyage from Great Yarmouth, Norfolk to Hull, Yorkshire. Ormrod was later refloated and taken in to Hull.
Phœnix	United Kingdom	The ship was driven ashore near Memel, Prussia.
Prince of Wales	United Kingdom	The ship was driven ashore on Hogland, Russia before 25 August.
Westerhall	United Kingdom	The ship was departed from North Shields before 1 September. No further trace, presumed foundered in the North Sea with the loss of all hands.
