= Ernest Dade =

English painter

- Born: Ernest Frederick Dade; 1868; Kensington, England
- Died: 3 November 1935; London, England
- Other name: Ernst Dade
- Education: Académie Julian
- Occupations: Painter; Model-maker

Ernest Frederick Dade (1868–1935), later known as Ernst Dade, was an English painter, specialising in coastal and maritime subjects, and maker of model ships. He was a member of the Staithes group, based in the North Yorkshire fishing village of Staithes.

== Early life ==
Dade was born in Kensington, England, Dade's father, Frederick Dade (1836–1874), was a photographer, married to Matilda Toye (1835–1919) in 1859. Ernest had two older sisters and the family moved to Scarborough early in Ernest's life. He later had another two sisters and three brothers, one of whom, the youngest, Fred (1874–1908), was also a maritime artist.

His first job was as a deck-hand on the American yacht, Dauntless. In 1885–1886, he studied at Scarborough School of Art, under Albert Strange. From the age of twenty he studied at the Académie Julian in Paris. He later studied fresco and mural painting in the South of France.

== Career ==
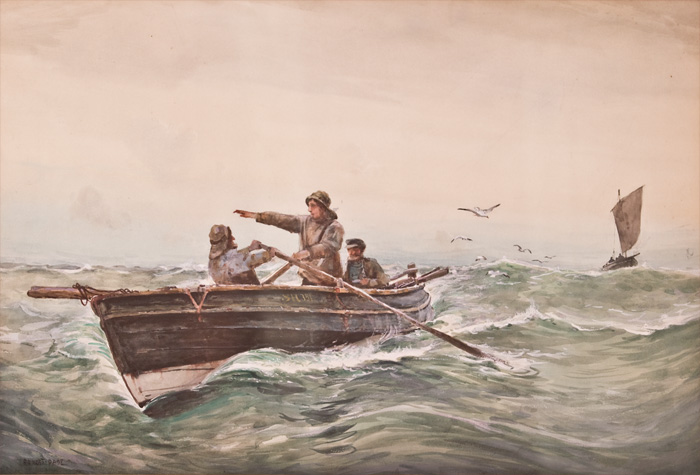
On the Fishing Grounds

Dade and Nelson Dawson rented studios at Manresa Road, Chelsea. By 1890, he was living at 8 West Bank, Seamer Road, Scarborough. In 1901, he became a founder member of the Staithes Art Club. After visiting Holland he began to use the first name 'Ernst'.

He exhibited at the Royal Society of British Artists, the New English Art Club (of which he became a member in 1887), the Royal Academy (from 1887 to 1901), the Royal Institute of Painters in Water Colours, the International Society of Sculptors, Painters and Gravers, the Walker Art Gallery and the Staithes Art Club.

== Personal life ==
Dade married Maud Alderson-Smith in St Martins Church, Scarborough in 1913. With her he returned to London where he had a studio at St John's Wood, sub-let in part to fellow Staithes Group members Laura and Harold Knight.

He was a member of the Society for Nautical Research. and wrote articles about boats and sailing, for their quarterly journal, The Mariner's Mirror. He was also a founder member and first Captain of the Scarborough Sailing Club, in 1895.

Dade died in London on 3 November 1935, and was survived by Maud.

== Legacy ==
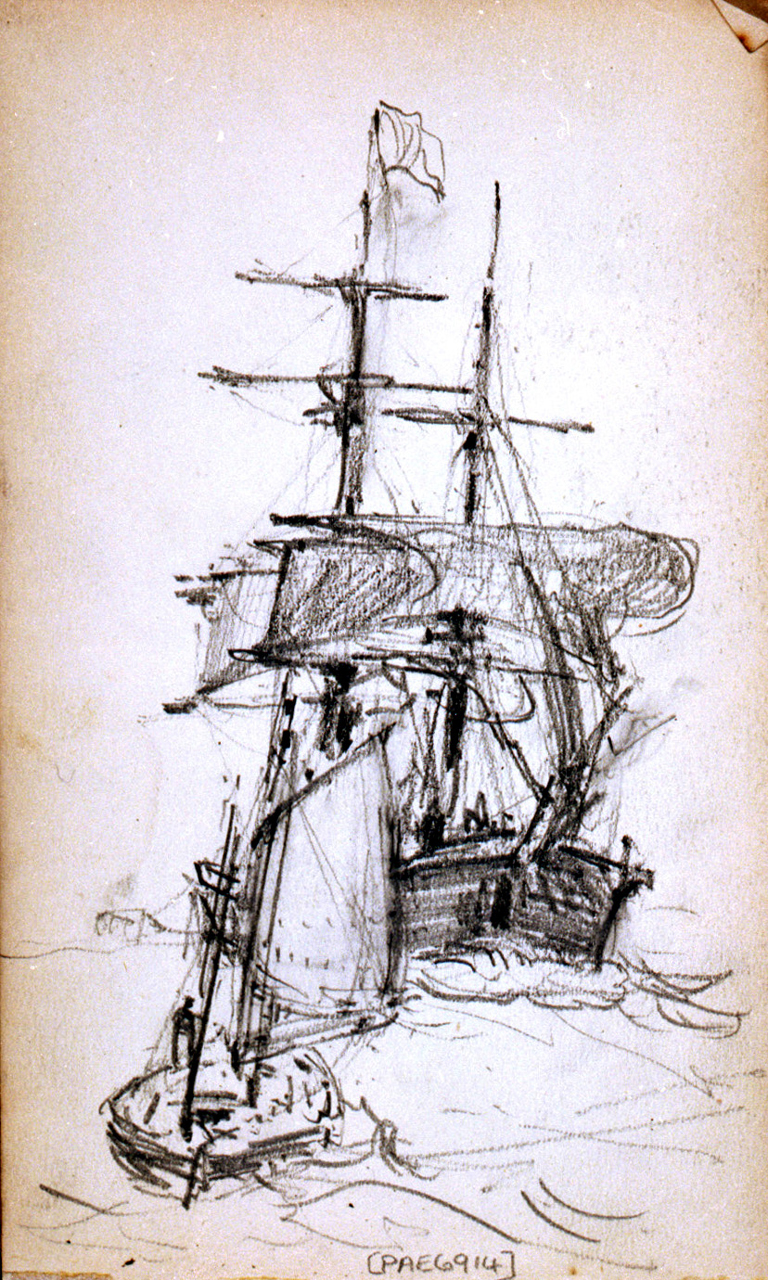
Sketch of small sailing craft and a square-rigger, from one of Dade's sketchbooks, at the National Maritime Museum

Institutions holding his work include the Imperial War Museum, the National Maritime Museum (which has his sketchbooks, and those of his brother Fred), Rotherham, Scarborough, and Whitby art galleries and the Art Gallery of New South Wales.

== Bibliography ==
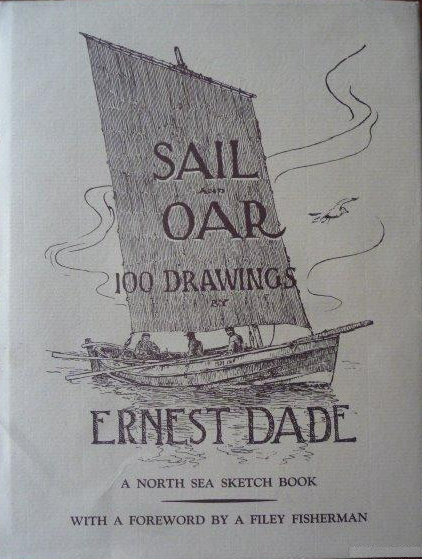
Book jacket from Sail and Oar

=== Books ===
- —— (1933). Sail and Oar. J M Dent and Sons Limited.
  - —— (1988). Sail and Oar. Ipswich Book Company. ISBN 978-1871696004. (Facsimile edition, with a Preface By Peter F. Anson)

=== Articles ===
- —— (January 1932). "Trawling Under Sail on the North East Coast". The Mariner's Mirror. 18 (4): 363–374. doi:10.1080/00253359.1932.10655670. (subscription required)
- —— (January 1933). "Old Yorkshire Yawls". The Mariner's Mirror. 19 (2): 182–195. doi:10.1080/00253359.1933.10655697. (subscription required)
- —— (January 1934). "The Cobbles". The Mariner's Mirror. 20 (2): 199–207. doi:10.1080/00253359.1934.10655749. (subscription required)

=== Further reading ===
- Peter Phillips (1993). The Staithes group. Phillips & Sons. ISBN 978-0-9521107-0-5.
