= Edith Dawson =

English artist and jeweller (1862–1929)

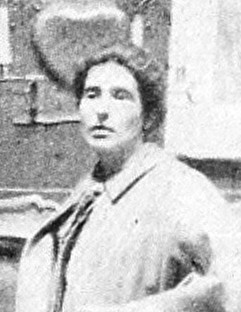
- Dawson, c.1896
- Born: Edith Brearey Dawson; 1862; Croydon, Surrey
- Died: 4 March 1929 (aged 66–67)
- Occupations: Artist, jeweller and member of the Arts and Crafts movement
- Spouse: Nelson Dawson (1893)

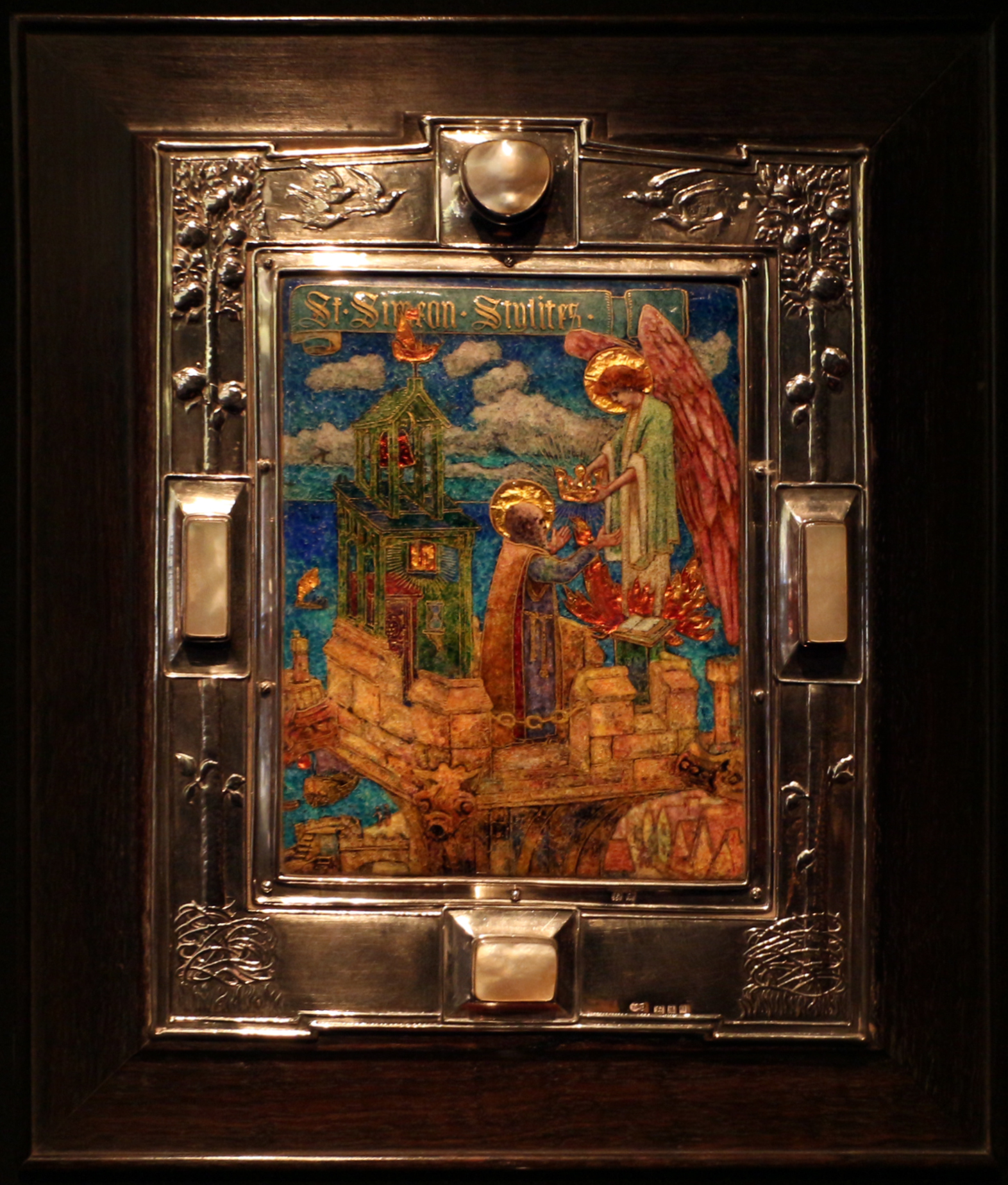
An enamel plaque by Edith Dawson in a silver frame by Nelson Dawson

Edith Brearey Dawson (née Robinson; 1862 – 4 March 1929) was an English artist, jeweller and member of the Arts and Crafts movement.

== Biography ==
Edith Robinson was born in Croydon, Surrey, to Quaker parents. In the 1880s Robinson was working as an art teacher and earning extra money through selling watercolours, primarily depicting cottage gardens and flowers.

In 1893 she married Nelson Dawson in London. He was an architecturally trained painter and metalworker. The two had met in an art shop in Scarborough, where Dawson was working as an assistant.

In the early 1890s Nelson Dawson attended a series of lectures on enamelling given by Alexander Fisher. It is unclear whether he then taught Edith the skill or whether they attended the lectures together. The two subsequently collaborated on jewellery, with Edith Dawson creating the enamels and Nelson Dawson the metalwork. Edith Dawson was a perfectionist and her enamels are of exceptionally high quality, with a delicate, jewel-like appearance that is easily recognisable. Examples of the Dawsons' work can be found in the Victoria and Albert Museum and the British Museum.

The couple moved to Chiswick where they set up a workshop. During the busiest years they employed up to twenty craftsmen. In 1900 they exhibited 125 pieces of jewellery at the Fine Art Society in Bond Street. However, by 1914 the couple were in financial difficulties and they reduced their metalwork output. They continued to create, and in 1917 exhibited several commemorative and heraldic plaques at the Royal Academy including one bearing the Arms of Trinity College, Cambridge in bronze and champlevé enamel.

In 1905 Edith Dawson published a small book entitled A Little Book on Art: Enamel. During her career Dawson also exhibited works with both the New English Art Club and the Royal Society of British Artists.
