= Robert Jobling =

British painter

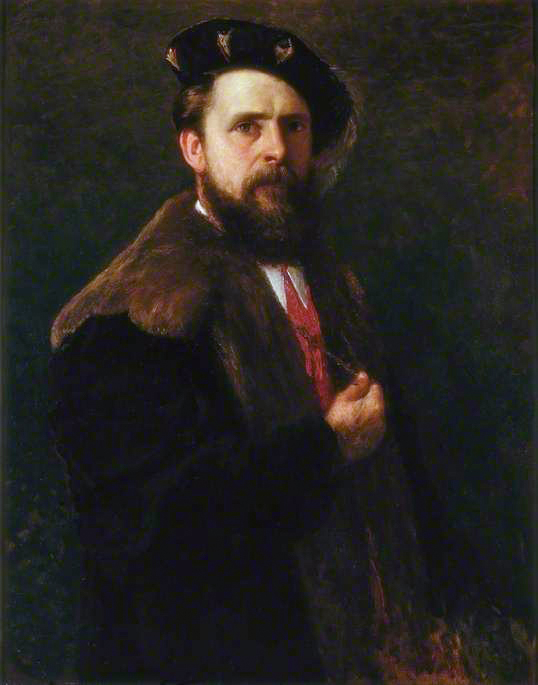
Self-portrait in historical costume (c. 1913)

Robert Jobling (1841–1923) was an English painter, mostly in oils but also watercolour. He first had work accepted by both the Royal Academy and Royal Society of British Artists in 1883. He painted regularly at the fishing village of Cullercoats and later at Staithes. His typical subjects are either fishing boats or the fishing community, especially the women left on shore. He attained a position of some standing in the Staithes group. His main artistic exposure was in exhibitions in the north of England.

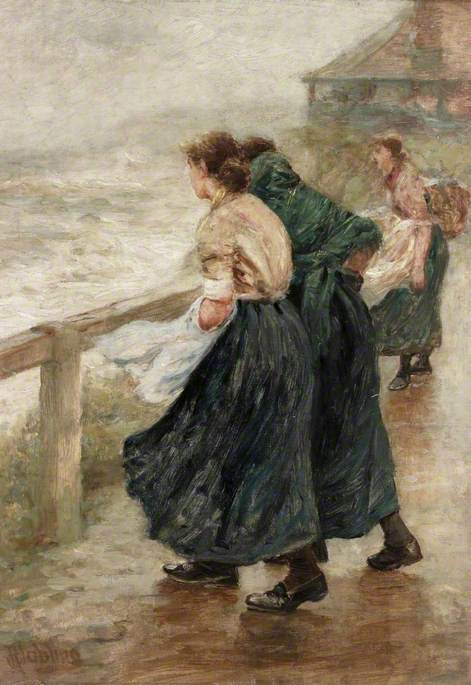
Anxious Times, Laing Art Gallery

== Life ==
He was born in Newcastle on Tyne, and from the age of 16 followed his father in working as a glassmaker (then a major industry in the city). He attended evening classes in art run by William Cosens Way (1833-1905), who was Director of the Newcastle upon Tyne School of Art, and mainly painted landscape watercolours. Jobling later became "foreman painter in a shipyard", while exhibiting in local art exhibitions. After an unusually successful one of these in 1899, he finally devoted himself to painting full time.

His second wife Isabella (Isa) Jobling (née Thompson) (1851–1926), who he married in 1903, was also a painter in a similar style, as was his son from his first marriage, Joseph Jobling (1870-1930). Isa had studied in Paris.

Jobling lived in Whitley Bay (near Cullercoats) and was a prominent member of the Cullercoats artist colony, along with Henry Emmerson, and various other artists including Winslow Homer. In 1890, the Newcastle Daily Journal wrote, "Mr. Jobling has made Cullercoats famous for his canvases, and by-the-by he will be famous for over-running the village with tourists." After about 1900 inland rural scenes became more common in his work, and he also painted some city vies, as well as scenes in Scotland, and on the continent.

In 1910 he was elected President of the Bewick Club, an organization to encourage the arts in the North-East.

The Laing Art Gallery in Newcastle on Tyne has several paintings, and other museums have examples. In 1992-93 the Laing held an exhibition "Robert & Isa Jobling: A Romance With The North East", with a published catalogue.

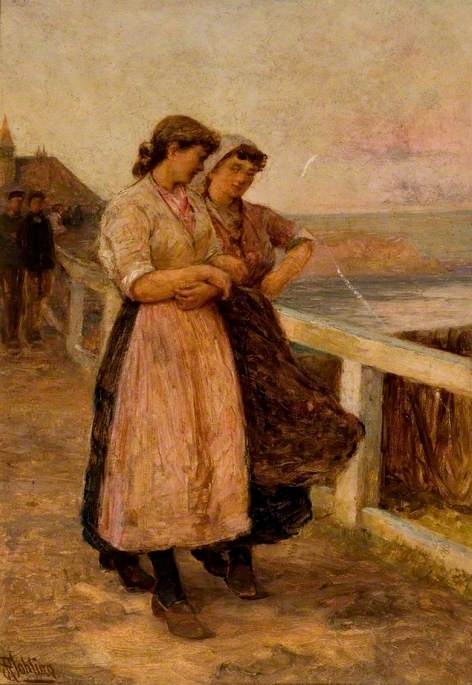
Pleasant Times, oil, Laing

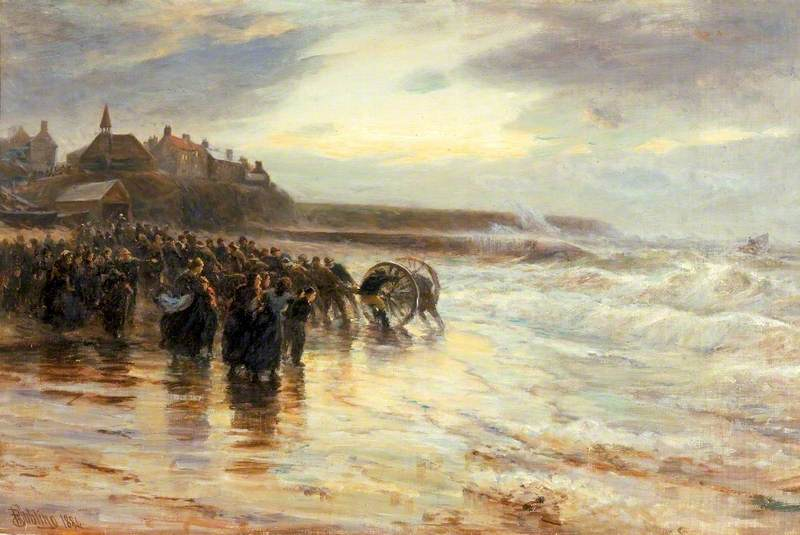
The Lifeboat Off, 1884, oil, Laing

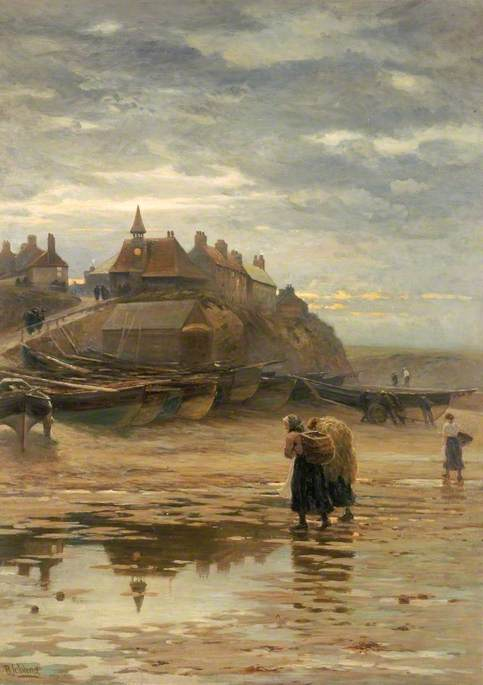
Darkness Falls from the Wings of Night, 1886, oil, Laing

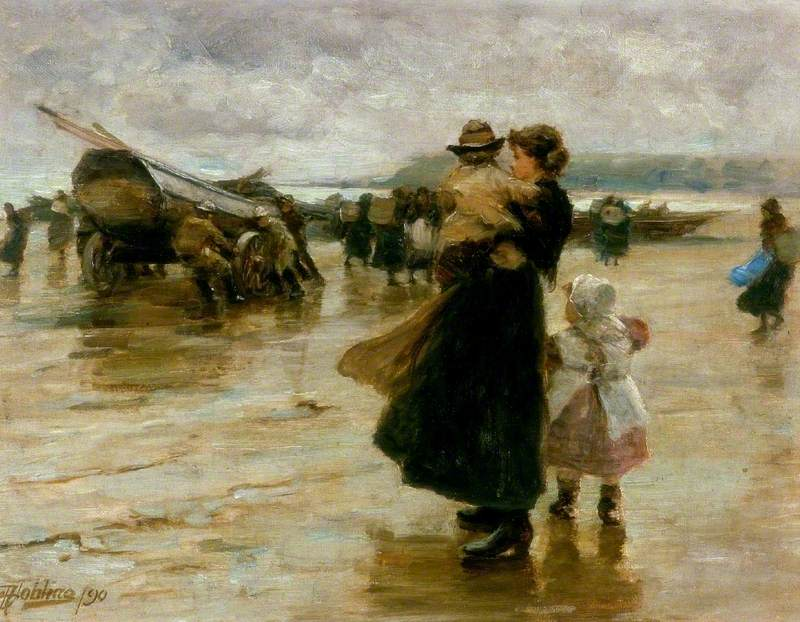
Hauling the Boats, 1890, oils, Laing

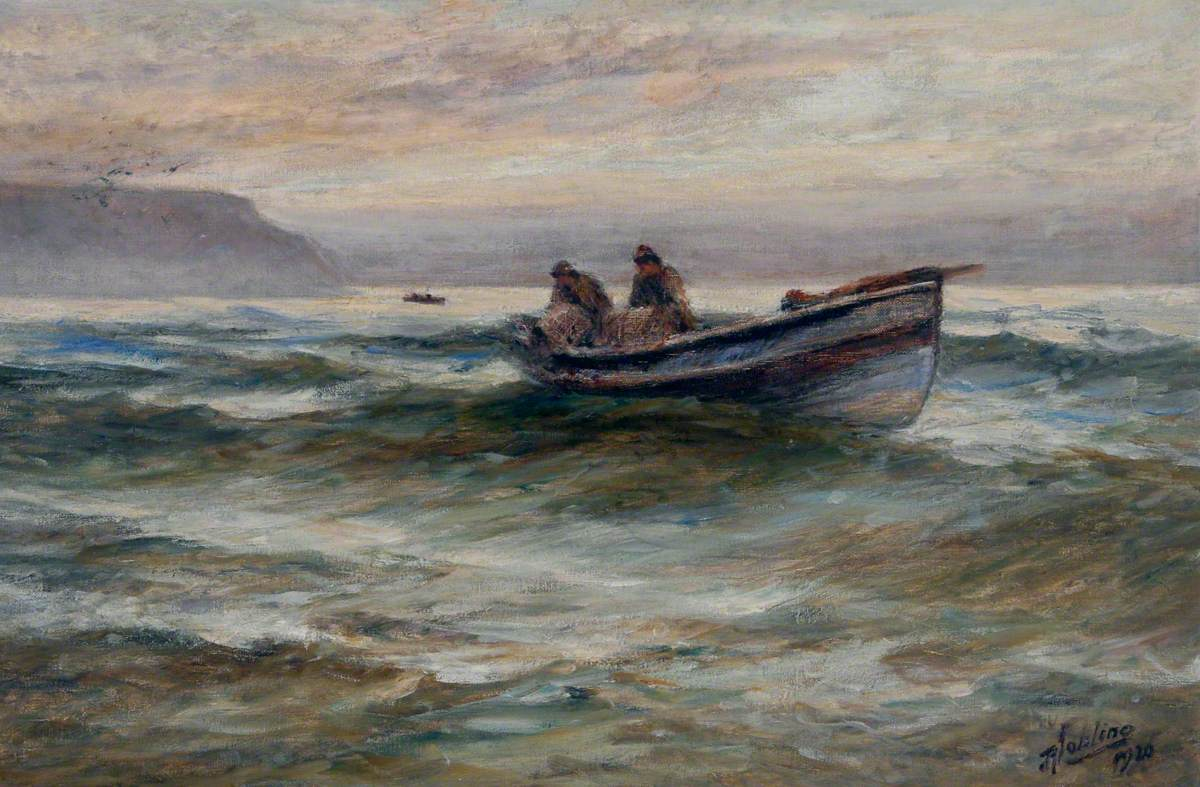
On the Tyne, oil, 1920
