= William Bagshawe =

English landowner and rower

William Leonard Gill Bagshawe (28 October 1828 – 20 July 1854) was an English landowner and rower who won the Diamond Challenge Sculls at Henley Royal Regatta in 1848.

Bagshawe was the son of the barrister William John Bagshawe, of Wormhill Hall in Derbyshire, and his wife Sarah Partridge. He was educated at Eton and Trinity College, Cambridge. In 1848 he won the Diamond Challenge Sculls at Henley and was awarded his rowing Blue in 1849 when he rowed in the victorious Cambridge crew in the March 1849 Boat Race. Oxford challenged Cambridge to a boat race re-row in December in which he took part, but the race was awarded to Oxford after a foul by the Cambridge boat.

Bagshawe succeeded to his father's estate at Wormhill in 1851. He was killed in an affray with poachers at Millers Dale. "A very promising, plucky, young fellow", he went with the keepers to deal with poachers who were netting the River Wye on his land, and was struck down by them with a stake on an island in the stream. His younger brother Francis Bagshawe inherited the estates.

His first cousin once removed was the artist Joseph Ridgard Bagshawe.

== See also ==
- List of Cambridge University Boat Race crews
