= Nelson Dawson =

British artist (1859 – 1941)

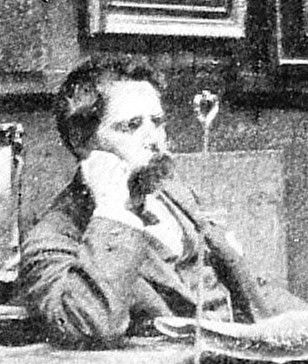
- Dawson, c.1896
- Born: 5 May 1859
- Died: 28 October 1941 (aged 82)
- Occupation: artist

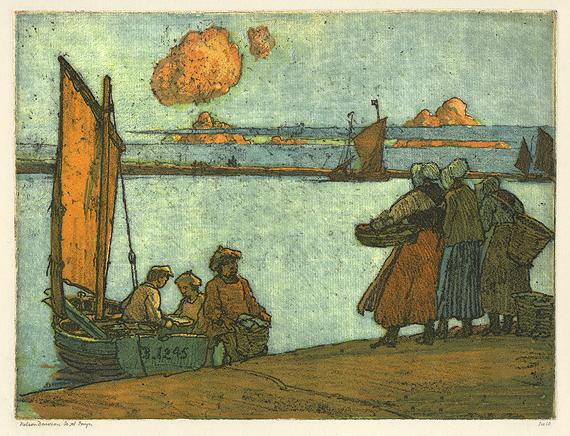
Three fisherwomen from Étaples, 1912, coloured etching

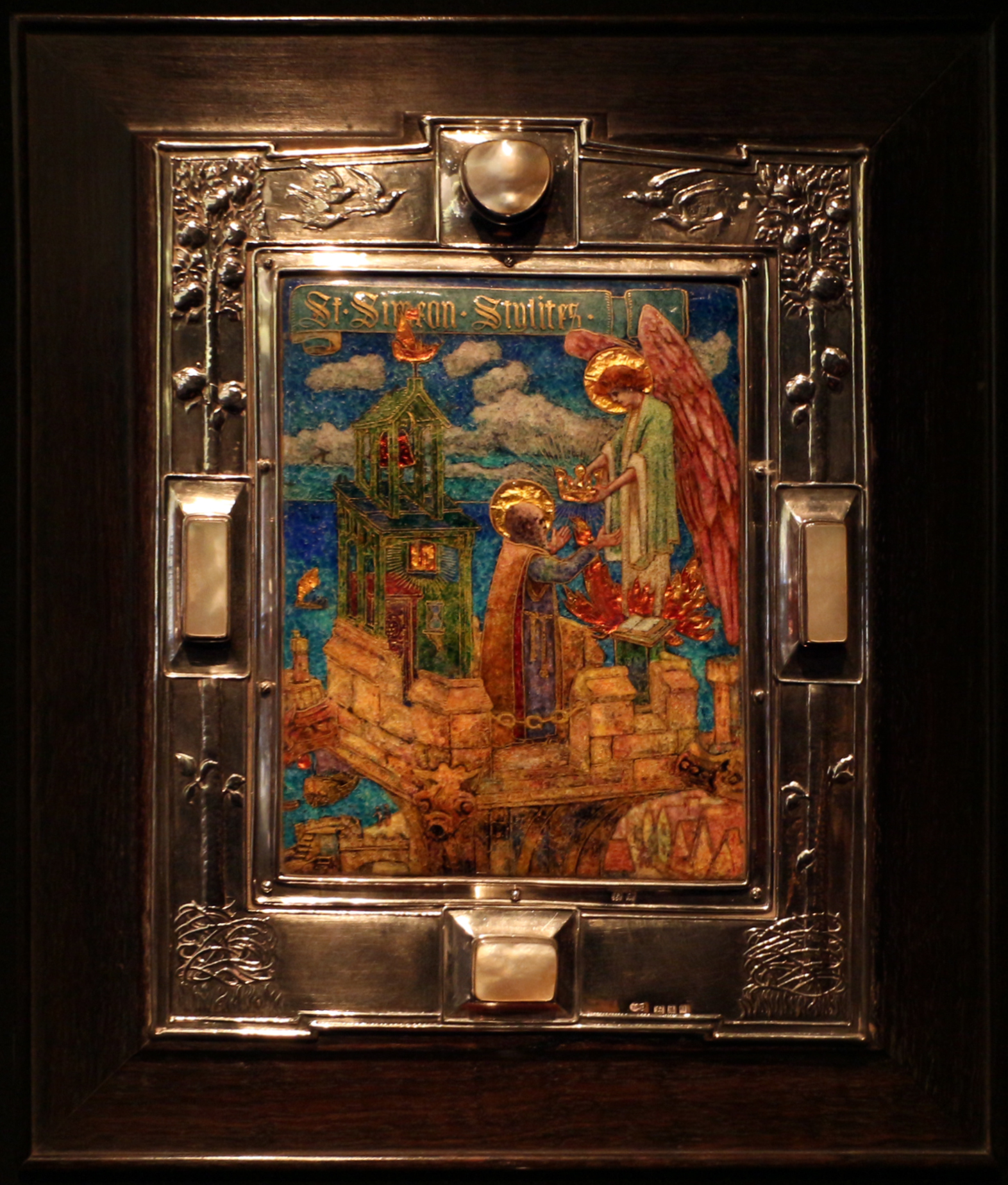
A silver frame by Nelson Dawson containing an enamel plaque by Edith Dawson

Nelson Ethelred Dawson (5 May 1859 – 28 October 1941) was an English artist and member of the Arts and Crafts movement.

Dawson was born in Stamford, Lincolnshire and educated at Stamford School. He moved to London, where he operated his workshop first from Manresa Road, Chelsea (shared with Ernest Dade) and in due course from the rear of his townhouse in Chiswick. He exhibited his art throughout England including at the Royal Academy and was elected an Associate of the Royal Society of Painters in Water Colours and a Fellow of the Royal Society of Painter-Etchers and Engravers.

As a potter, watercolour painter, jeweller, silversmith, metalworker, etcher, print-maker and writer on artistic subjects, his reputation has probably suffered because he spread his talents too thinly. Nevertheless, the British Museum, the Victoria & Albert Museum and National Maritime Museum at Greenwich hold collections of his work and papers. He married Edith Robinson in 1893 and together with his wife, he was one of the key figures in the jewellery of the Arts and Crafts movement.

Edith learned enamelling from her husband who had been taught by Alexander Fisher, a master enameller who in turn had learned his craft in France. Together, they revived the Renaissance practice of enamelling in their jewellery.

The bronze organ grill in Holy Trinity church, Sloane Street, Chelsea (described by Poet Laureate, John Betjeman as the "Cathedral of the Arts & Crafts Movement") is Dawson’s work and it takes its place beside treasures by William Morris and Edward Burne-Jones. Other commissions included a trowel and mallet used by Queen Victoria in her last public appearance, laying the foundation stone of the Victoria & Albert Museum in 1899, the casket presented to U.S. President Woodrow Wilson on his visit to England en route to the Paris Peace Conference, 1919, lavish bath fittings for Viscount Hambleden in copper and silver, and the gates of Hull Guildhall.

In 1901, Dawson founded The Artificers' Guild from his workshop in Chiswick but it was acquired by Montague Fordham (one time director of the Birmingham Guild and School of Handicrafts) in 1903.

He is noted for his maritime scenes. In 1910 he made a visit to the Étaples art colony.

After the death of Edith in 1929, he married Ada Rose Mansell. At his death in 1941, Dawson left many of his pictures to Stamford School but although a number of etchings and watercolours still decorate the walls of the school, not all were stored or displayed properly and some canvasses were even painted over by pupils.

A retrospective of his work at Stamford Museum closed on 26 January 2008. Georgetown University Library in 2009 hosted an exhibition of his marine views called Etched by the Sea. A blue plaque marks his birthplace in Stamford.
