= Joseph Ridgard Bagshawe =

British artist (1870–1909)

Joseph John Richard Bagshawe
- Born: 1 July 1870; London, England
- Died: 10 January 1909 (aged 38); London, England
- Education: Beaumont College; St. Augustine's, Ramsgate
- Alma mater: Royal College of Art
- Occupation: Painter
- Spouse: Mildred Turnbull
- Relatives: Clarkson Frederick Stanfield (grandfather); Edward Gilpin Bagshawe (uncle); William Leonard Gill Bagshawe (cousin)

Joseph John Richard Bagshawe (1 July 1870 – 1 November 1909) was an English marine painter and member of the Staithes group. He was the grandson of the painter Clarkson Stanfield.

== Early life ==
Born in London, he came from the prominent Catholic Bagshawe family of Wormhill Hall, near Buxton, Derbyshire, and of Oakes-in-Norton, near Sheffield, the second son of County Court Judge William Henry Gunning Bagshawe KC (1825–1901) and his wife Harriet Teresa, daughter of the leading marine painter Clarkson Frederick Stanfield. His father was first cousin of the Cambridge rower William Leonard Gill Bagshawe.

Educated first at Beaumont College and St. Augustine's, Ramsgate, he went on to study art under Hubert Vos at the Royal College of Art at South Kensington in London and, under Edmond van Hove in Bruges.

== Career ==
He first visited Yorkshire in 1896, and in 1901 became founding secretary of the Staithes Art Club. Shortly afterwards, he settled at the Old Rectory in nearby Whitby, and married Janet Mildred, the daughter of a prominent local shipbuilder, Thomas Turnbull, of Airy Hill, Whitby.

Bagshawe regularly went out to sea with the fishermen, eventually deciding to buy a small yacht which he took out for trips that lasted as long as a fortnight. He also travelled to the coasts of the Netherlands, Normandy, Finland and the West Coast of Ireland to paint.

Working in both oils and watercolours, he exhibited at the Glasgow Institute, the Walker Gallery Liverpool, Manchester City Art Gallery, the Royal Academy (from 1897), the Royal Society of British Artists (elected a member in 1904) and the Royal Institute of Painters in Oils. His work "After Dark" contributed to the Royal Academy in 1907 won special recognition from critics.

He wrote and illustrated articles for The Field, and The Yachting and Boating Monthly, which his son, Gerard Wilfrid Bagshawe, published as a collection in 1933. Joseph Richard Bagshawe died at the age of thirty-nine as a result of diabetes. Examples of his work can be found in the Pannet Art Gallery, Whitby and the Victoria and Albert Museum.

== Family ==
His uncle, The Most Rev. Edward Gilpin Bagshawe D.D. was the Catholic Bishop of Nottingham. His great-granddaughter Louise Mensch is an author and was, for two years, a Member of Parliament; her younger sister Tilly Bagshawe is an author and journalist.

== Spelling of name ==
His name is sometimes recorded as Joseph John Ridgard Bagshawe. His birth and death certificates both state his name is Joseph John Richard Bagshawe.

Ridgard was the maiden name of his grandmother and a middle name he gave to one of his sons.
