= Staithes group =

Artists' colony in North Yorkshire, England

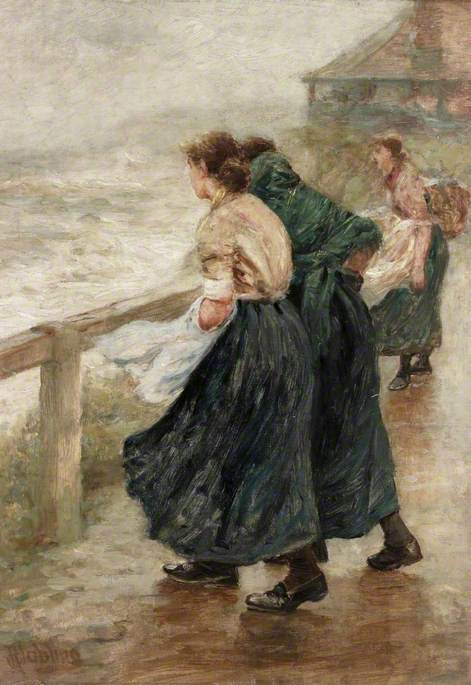
Robert Jobling (1841–1923), Anxious Times, Laing Art Gallery

The Staithes group or Staithes school was an artists' colony of over thirty 19th- and early 20th-century painters based in or visiting the North Yorkshire fishing village of Staithes, near Whitby. The Staithes Art Club held exhibitions in the village, and later Whitby, from 1901 to 1904 and for this period and a few years afterwards there was formal membership of the group, unlike with many such "colonies". Before and after this many of the artists exhibited with the larger Yorkshire Union of Artists (founded in 1887), whose exhibitions toured to various towns.

The group often worked en plein air in oil or in watercolour. Their subjects concentrated on the local landscape and coast, and the harsh working lives of the local people. Their styles were in the Realist but loosely handled manner found in the Newlyn school, the Manchester school of painters and (further afield and earlier) the Hague school, the Barbizon school, the Skagen Painters and many other artists of those years. Today such styles tend to be referred to as wider manifestations of French Impressionism, which probably had a very limited and indirect influence on most of the Staithes painters.

The group contained well-known artists such as Laura Knight, who lived and kept a studio in the village with her husband and fellow painter Harold Knight between 1898 and 1907, Frederick W. Jackson, Edward E. Anderson, Joseph R. Bagshawe, Thomas Barrett and James W. Booth. Others lived in the general region, or visited in the summer to paint.

== Member artists ==
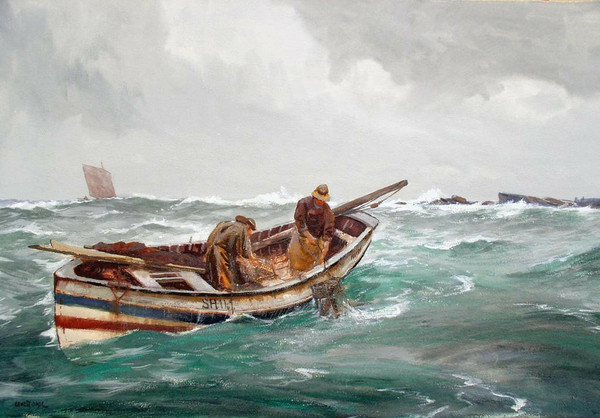
Ernest Dade, Crabbing Coble off Filey Brigg, North Yorkshire

- Edward Enoch Anderson (1878–1961)
- John Atkinson (1863–1924)
- Joseph R. Bagshawe (1870–1909)
- Thomas Barrett (1848–1924)
- James William Booth (1867–1953)
- Owen Bowen (1873–1967)
- John Bowman (1872–1915)
- Andrew Charles Colley (1859–1910)
- Harold Edward Conway (b.1872)

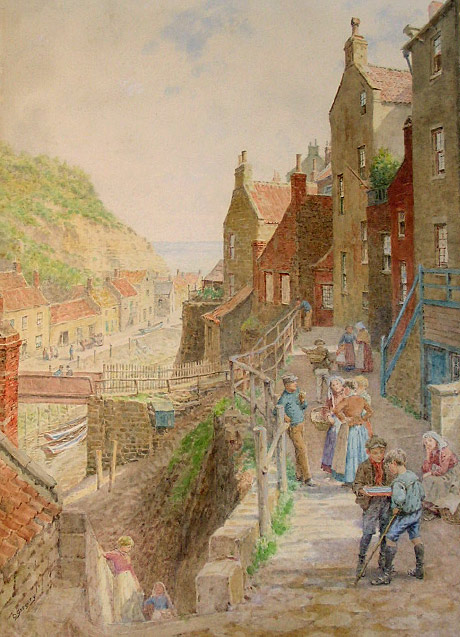
Staithes by Charles Gregory, c. 1920

- Lionel Townsend Crawshaw (1864–1949)
- Ernest Dade (1868–1936)
- William Gilbert Foster (1855–1906)
- Arthur A Friedenson (1872–1955)
- Sidney Valentine Gardner (1869–1957)
- Leandro Ramón Garrido (1869–1909)
- Ralph Hedley (1848–1913)
- Florence Adelina Hess (1891–1974)
- Rowland Henry Hill (1873–1952)
- Henry Silkstone Hopwood (1860–1914)
- John William Howey (1873–1938)
- John Spence Ingall (1850–1936)
- Frederick William Jackson (1859–1918)
- Isabella (Isa) Jobling (née Thompson) (1851–1926)
- Robert Jobling (1841–1923)
- Harold Knight (1874–1961)
- Dame Laura Knight (née Johnson) (1877–1970)
- Charles Hodge Mackie (1862–1920)
- Frank Henry Mason (1875–1965)
- Hannah Mayor (née Hoyland) (1871–1947)
- William Frederick Mayor (1865–1916)
- Paul Paul (1865–1937)
- Frederick Stuart Richardson (1855–1934)
- Ernest Higgins Rigg (1868–1947)
- Mark Senior (1862–1927)
- Albert George Stevens (1863–1925)
- Percy Morton Teasdale (1870–1961)
- Joseph Alfred Terry (1872–1939)
- Hirst Walker (1868–1957)
- James Watson (1851–1936)
- John Wright (1857–1933)

== Exhibitions ==
- Pannett Park Museum and Art Gallery, Whitby, North Yorkshire
- Brockfield Hall, Warthill, North Yorkshire

== See also ==
- Cullercoats
- Newlyn School
