= Jon Middlemiss =

British artist and potter

Jon Middlemiss (1949–2021) was a British artist and potter.

== Biography ==
He was born in Yorkshire. He attended Scarborough School of Art and Exeter College of Art and Design and taught pottery for three years before settling in Lelant, near St Ives.

His vessel forms worked with themes of transformation, symbolism and geometric imagery. Middlemiss was elected a member of the International Academy of Ceramics, Prague in 1994. and was a member of the Crafts Council's select index of makers.

Middlemiss was a lecturer at Falmouth College of Arts from 1995 to 2005 and taught at an Adult Education Centre in the Arts Centre at Brunel University from 2012 to 2018 as a tutor in pottery.

He was awarded a gold medal at the 13th Biennale, Vallauris in 1992 a silver medal at the Kutani International Ceramics Competition in 1997 and gold medal at the 13th Biennale International Triennale de Ceramique d'Art. Vallauris, France.

He exhibited his work internationally including at Beaux Arts Gallery in 1994,the Museum for Hamburg History in 2000, Mint Museum North Carolina in 2010, the 4th World Ceramic Biennale in 2007 and the Brunel University of London in 2011.

Middlemiss collaborated with the Cornwall Wildlife Trust on a land art project between Lamorna Cove and Mousehole.

His work is held in Cornwall Museum and Art Gallery Truro, San Angelo Museum of Fine Arts Texas, the Museum August Kestner, Hannover, Germany, the Museum Angewandte Kunst, Cologne, Germany and the Het Princessehof, Leeuwarden, Netherlands.
