= Scarborough TEC =

Further education college in North Yorkshire, England

Coordinates: 54.2840°N 0.4359°W

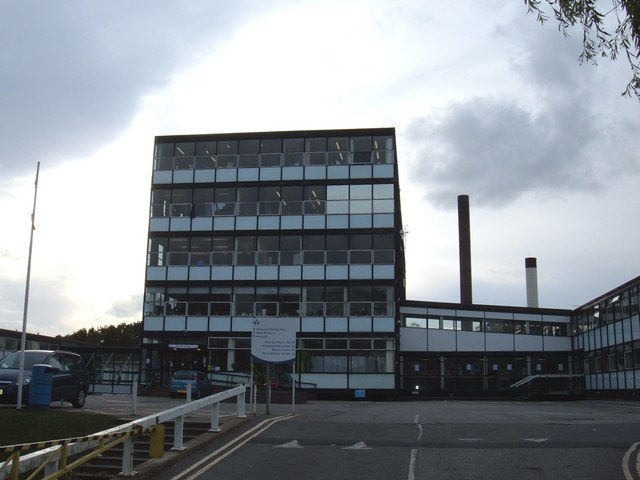
Old building on Lady Edith's Drive

Scarborough TEC, formerly known as Yorkshire Coast College of Further and Higher Education, Scarborough Technical College, Scarborough Technical Institute, and Scarborough School of Art is a further education college located on Filey Road Scarborough, North Yorkshire, England. It is a constituent college of the Grimsby Institute of Further & Higher Education.

Yorkshire Coast College was originally an independently controlled institution, but due to consistently poor results and long-term financial difficulties was taken over by the Grimsby Institute in January 2010.

College courses for students from Scarborough and the surrounding area include NVQs, GCSEs, BTECs, Apprenticeships and Access courses, and some higher education courses in conjunction with the University of Hull.

In November 2016, the name was changed from Yorkshire Coast College to Scarborough TEC, with the TEC standing for Training, Education, Careers.

== Notable recent alumni ==
- Ryan Swain – TV & radio presenter, DJ and motivational speaker.
- Chris Helme – lead vocalist with The Seahorses
- Oliver Knight – singer/songwriter
- James Martin – celebrity chef and television personality.
- Jon Middlemiss Cornwall based artist and potter.
- Robert Palmer – recording artist
- Mark Richardson – drummer with Skunk Anansie
- Timothy Sheader – theatre artistic director
- Jon Snow – journalist and presenter of Channel 4 News

== Alumni from period as Scarborough School of Art 1882–1907 ==
- Fred Appleyard – landscape artist
- Frances Crawshaw – painter, botanical artist
- Ernest Dade – painter, specialising in coastal and maritime subjects, and maker of model ships
- Ian Hunter – painter and Dean of Fine Art at Central Saint Martins, London
- Frank Henry Mason – maritime artist, and creator of art deco travel and railway posters
- Albert Strange – Principal of the school for its first 35 years, yacht designer, and maritime artist
- Harry Watson – landscape and portrait artist
