= Harry Watson (British artist) =

English painter (1871–1936)

- Born: 13 June 1871; Scarborough, England
- Died: 17 September 1936 (aged 65); London, England
- Known for: Painter
- Notable work: Across the River

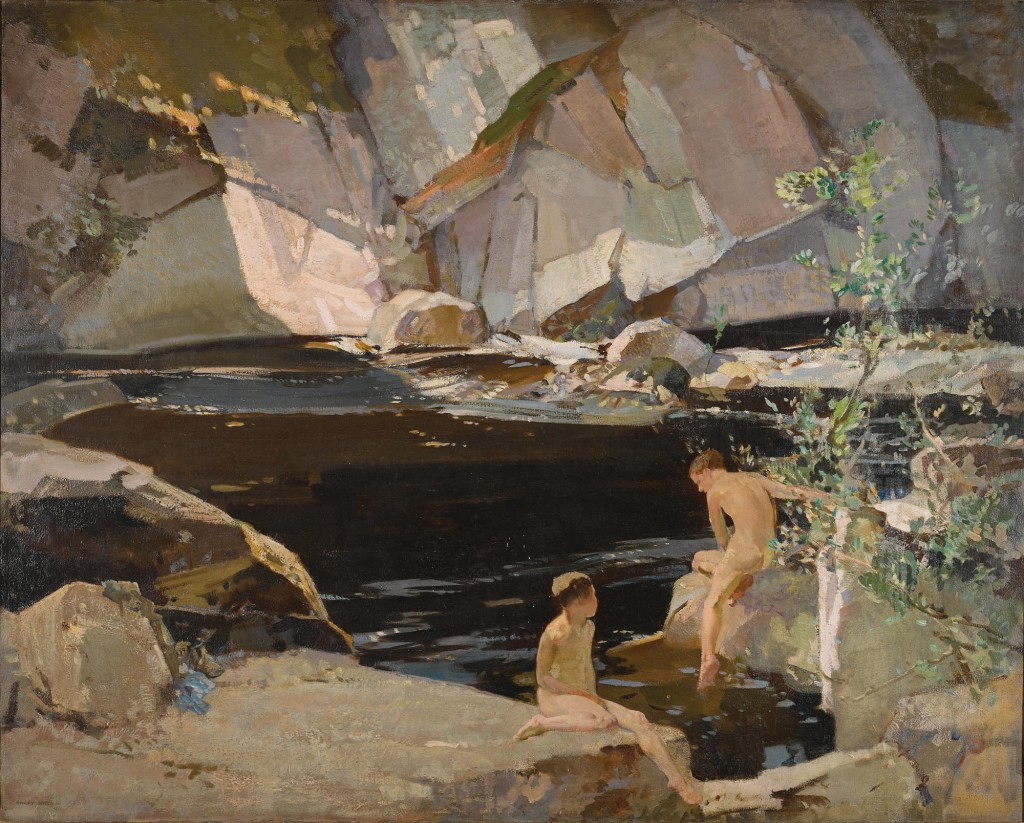
Two Boys Bathing in a Rockpool

Harry Watson (13 June 1871 – 17 September 1936) was an English landscape and portrait artist from Scarborough, North Yorkshire.

== Biography ==
Warson was born and educated in Scarborough. He lived in Winnipeg, Canada, between 1881 and 1883. He studied at the Scarborough School of Art 1884–88, at the Lambeth School of Art and at the Royal College of Art (R.C.A.) 1889–94, where he won numerous gold, silver and bronze medals and was awarded a travelling scholarship to Italy.

Watson exhibited at the Royal Academy (R.A.) from 1896. He was also a member of the Royal Watercolour Society (R.W.S.) from 1915, of the Royal West of England Academy (R.W.A.) from 1927, and of the Royal Institute of Oil Painters (R.O.I.) from 1932. He taught life drawing at the Regent Street Polytechnic from 1913.

Watson embraced painting en plein air, often capturing the effect of natural light falling onto his subjects which gives many of his works an impressionistic style. His paintings Sunlight Reflected Upon a Wide Riverscape and Reflected Light are two examples which demonstrate his use of natural light.

His watercolour Across the River is in the permanent collection at the Tate Gallery. Scarborough Art Gallery has a number of his paintings. The Christchurch Art Gallery, the Walker Art Gallery and the Royal Watercolour Society also have examples of his work. His work was part of the painting event in the art competition at the 1932 Summer Olympics.

In 1930 his book Figure Drawing was published.

In 1938 a memorial exhibition was held at Leamington Spa Art Gallery.

Harry Watson was a lifelong friend of Fred Appleyard, also a Scarborough artist.
