= Tally Ho (yacht) =

British gaff cutter yacht

Development
- Designer: Albert Strange
- Year: 1910
- No. built: 1
- Builders: Stow & Son
- Role: Recreational cruising
- Name: Tally Ho

Boat
- Draft: 2.3 m (7 ft 6 in)

Hull
- Hull weight: 30,480 kg (30 long tons) TM
- LOA: 14.6 m (48 ft)
- LWL: 13.6 m (44 ft 6 in)
- Beam: 3.9 m (12 ft 10 in)
- Engine: 4-cyl. Beta 88 hp (66 kW)

Hull appendages
- Rudder: Transom hung

Rig
- Rig type: Gaff cutter

Sails
- Other sails: Gaff topsail; 3 headsails

Tally Ho is a gaff-rigged cutter yacht designed by the artist and yacht designer Albert Strange. The 15-metre (48 ft) yacht was built at Shoreham-by-Sea, West Sussex in England and has previously carried the names Betty, Alciope, and Escape.

It won the 1927 Fastnet Race, in 1968 was shipwrecked off the Pacific island of Manuae, and worked as a motor fishing vessel in Oregon, before being stored ashore in 2010. By 2017 the hull had nearly rotted away, and was in danger of being scrapped. Its owners, the Albert Strange Association, sold it to an English boatbuilder to be completely refit. Seven years later, in June 2024, with the restoration nearly complete, Tally Ho sailed in the open water of Port Townsend Bay.

== Description ==
Albert Strange is best known for the canoe yawl with a double-ended or canoe-stern hull and the two masts of the yawl rig. However, Strange designed Tally Ho with a transom stern and a cutter rig, which was an unusual design for him. (Note: The rudder hangs on the transom itself; this allows a trim tab to be attached to the aft end of the rudder blade, an arrangement which is much less onerous on electric autopilots.) Originally named Betty, the boat was built in 1910 in Shoreham-by-Sea, West Sussex, England, by Stow & Son. The cutter is carvel-built, and has a long keel. Tally Ho's rig comprises a gaff mainsail, three foresails (staysail, jib, and flying staysail), and a gaff topsail. An auxiliary 4-cylinder diesel engine drives a four-bladed bronze feathering propeller.

== History ==
The boat was built for Charles Hellyer of Brixham, Devon, England, for relaxed cruising and deep-sea fishing. In 1913, Hellyer commissioned the larger Betty II and sold Betty. After two other owners and a name change to Alciope, ownership of the boat passed in 1927 to the then Lord Stalbridge, who renamed it Tally Ho.

Tally Ho was one of only two yachts from the fifteen starters to complete the 1927 Fastnet Race. The yacht crossed the finish under heavy conditions, 52 minutes after the John G. Alden–designed 30-ton schooner La Goleta, but won the race on corrected time.

While still based in Southampton until the 1960s, Tally Ho made multiple transatlantic crossings. In 1967, Jim Loudon of New Zealand embarked on Tally Ho, heading home via the Panama Canal. After briefly chartering in the Caribbean, he made his way to Rarotonga by July 1968, where he chartered to transport 20 tons of copra from Manuae 190 kilometres (120 miles) away. While heaving to at Manuae waiting for daylight, the boat drifted onto the coral reef near the island, stoving in the port side, grounding it on the reef. While being floated with empty oil drums, Tally Ho rolled over, and in the process lost its mast, bowsprit, and rudder. Still, the boat was able to stay afloat long enough to be towed back to Rarotonga to be rebuilt.

After some years, the yacht worked as a fishing boat out of the Port of Brookings Harbor, Oregon, until 1987, under the name Escape. From 2010 until 2017 Tally Ho was kept on stands in a boatyard in Brookings-Harbor by the Albert Strange Association.

== Sampson Boat Company restoration ==
Leo Sampson Goolden
- Known for: Tally Ho restoration

YouTube information
- Channel: Sampson Boat Co.
- Years active: 2017–present
- Genres: boatbuilding; shipwright; woodworking; sailing
- Subscribers: 595 thousand
- Views: 167 million
- Last updated: 25 August 2026
- Website: sampsonboat.co.uk

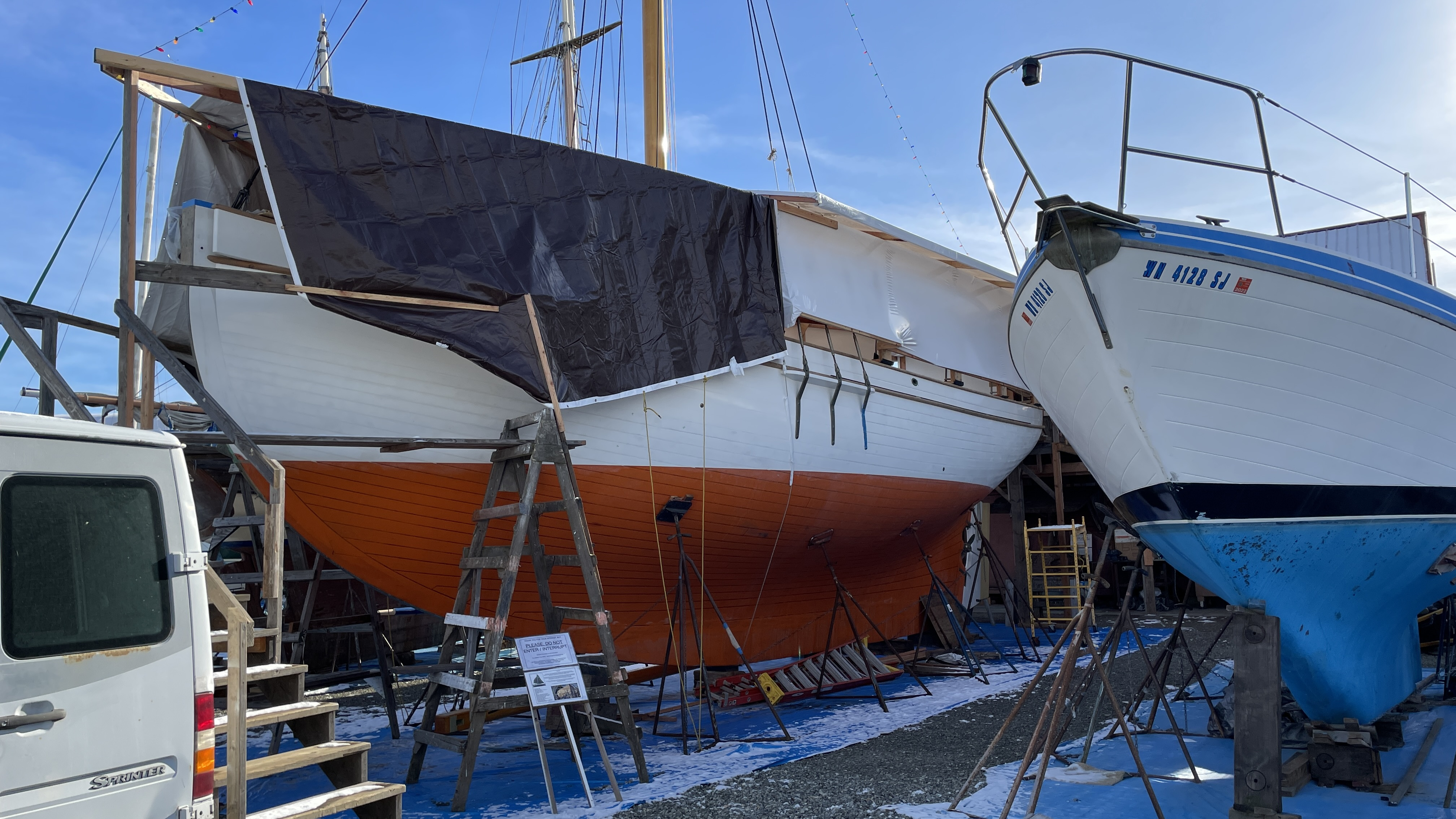
Tally Ho, in white and orange, in the Port Townsend Boatyard. Current anti-foul paint is green

Until 2017, the Albert Strange Association owned the boat and had planned to restore and refit it. The hope was to eventually facilitate its return to the United Kingdom. Facing difficulties in their refit plans, in June 2017, the Association sold Tally Ho to English boatbuilder and sailor Leo Sampson Goolden for $1. He moved the boat to Sequim, Washington for restoration. Goolden has gained media attention for his videos of the restoration which he publishes at the Sampson Boat Co. YouTube channel.

In 2021, Clallam County required Goolden to apply for a conditional use permit, as the location where the boat restoration work was taking place was not zoned for that activity. Goolden settled the dispute with the county, and agreed to move the boat before 18 September 2021. In July 2021, Goolden's Sampson Boat Company and Tally Ho relocated to the nearby Port of Port Townsend, Washington, boatyard to complete the restoration there.

In April 2024, Tally Ho was successfully launched. In June 2024, seven years after the beginning of the restoration, Tally Ho sailed under its full set of five sails in the open water of Port Townsend Bay. The cutter was then moved to the sheltered waters of the Canadian fjords for trials.

== Post-restoration ==
Goolden announced plans to sail Tally Ho back to Britain in time to compete in the 2027 instance of the Fastnet race, the centenary of its original win. The planned route to the UK is via Panama, the Windward Islands, and New England.

Tally Ho transited the Panama canal in February 2026, and after which stayed in the Caribbean Sea and Ft. Lauderdale, Florida, for repairs and preparations to cross the Atlantic. On July 5, Tally Ho departed Florida, en route to the UK.

After 24 days at sea and having covered nearly 3,700 nautical miles (6,900 kilometres; 4,300 miles) Tally Ho arrived in Baltimore, Ireland following a successful Atlantic crossing.
