= The Boat Race 1849 (December) =

10th Boat Race
- Date: 15 December 1849
- Winner: Oxford
- Margin of victory: Cambridge disqualified
- Winning time: No time
- Overall record (Cambridge–Oxford): 7–3
- Umpire: Mr Fellowes (Leander Club)

The 10th Boat Race took place on the River Thames on 15 December 1849. Typically held annually, the event is a side-by-side rowing race between crews from the Universities of Oxford and Cambridge. The race ended with Oxford declared winners after Cambridge were disqualified. It is the only time the Boat Race has been held twice in a calendar year, and is also the only time the event has been decided as a result of a disqualification.

== Background ==
The causes of our defeat were partial want of condition, a bad boat (built by Hall), and bad steering. We led from the moment of starting to Chiswick Eyot; but here our coxswain took us over the back-water on the Surrey side, and without any apparent diminution in our efforts, the boat seemed to stop almost dead, the Cantabs came up in the midsream and tide, and passed like a shot. The race was then at an end.

— W. G. Rich, President O.U.B.C. writing after the race in March 1849

The Boat Race is a side-by-side rowing competition between the University of Oxford (sometimes referred to as the "Dark Blues") and the University of Cambridge (sometimes referred to as the "Light Blues"). The race was first held in 1829, and since 1845 has taken place on the 4.2-mile (6.8 km) Championship Course on the River Thames in southwest London.

Cambridge had beaten Oxford "easily" in the race earlier that year. It was as a result of the manner of the defeat, and with doubts over the construction of the Oxford boat that they issued a challenge to Cambridge University Boat Club in October to race again in December. The invitation to race was "immediately accepted." Cambridge held the overall lead, with seven victories to Oxford's two.

== Crews ==
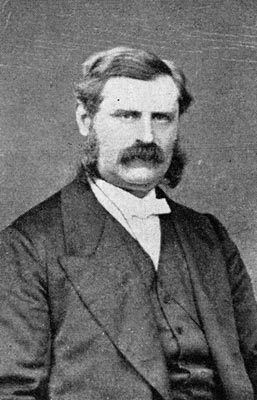
William Houghton rowed at number two for Oxford.

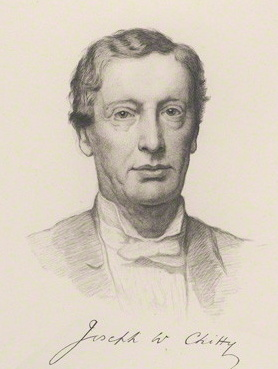
Joseph William Chitty occupied the four seat for Oxford.

Oxford's crew contained four rowers who had featured in the previous race in March, with Chitty, Steward, Sykes and Rich returning for the Dark Blues. Cambridge welcomed back five rowers and the cox, George Booth. The difference in weight between the crews was marginal, Oxford's rowers weighing an average of just under 11 st 6 lb (72.4 kg) were 0.125 pounds (0.06 kg) per man heavier than Cambridge.

Seat	Cambridge			Oxford		
Seat	Name	College	Weight	Name	College	Weight
Bow	A. T. Baldry	1st Trinity	10 st 10 lb	J. J. Hornby	Brasenose	11 st 8 lb
2	H. P. Pellew	3rd Trinity	11 st 0 lb	W. Houghton	Brasenose	11 st 2 lb
3	A. R. De Rutzen	3rd Trinity	11 st 8 lb	James Wodehouse	Exeter	11 st 7lb
4	J. C. Holden (P)	3rd Trinity	11 st 11 lb	J. W. Chitty	Balliol	11 st 9 lb
5	W. L. G. Bagshawe	3rd Trinity	12 st 0 lb	J. Aitken	Exeter	12 st 1 lb
6	H. J. Miller	3rd Trinity	12 st 0 lb	C. H. Steward	Oriel	12 st 2 lb
7	W. C. Hodgson	1st Trinity	11 st 3 lb	J. J. Sykes	Worcester	10 st 2 lb
Stroke	J. C. Wray	2nd Trinity	11 st 0 lb	W. G. Rich (P)	Christ Church	11 st 2 lb
Cox	George Booth	1st Trinity	10 st 12 lb	Richard Wm. Cotton	Christ Church	9 st 0 lb
Source: (P) – boat club president

== Race ==
The Championship Course along which the Boat Race is conducted.

Oxford won the toss and elected to start from the Middlesex station, leaving Cambridge with Surrey. Weather conditions were poor: rain and a strong wind provided a "pitiless pelting" to spectators and the crews alike. Although pre-race betting indicated no clear favourite, the high winds were thought to provide Cambridge with a slight advantage "as their style of rowing was deemed to be more suitable to stormy weather" and so the Light Blues went into the race as marginal favourites.

Both crews were on the river before 3 p.m. in boats constructed by Searle and Sons, described as "masterpieces of art", complete with splashboards to reduce the amount of water taken on board. Cambridge made the better start and were clear by the Searles boathouse. They increased the lead by a further half-a-length and held it for another 0.5 miles (0.8 km), at which point Oxford produced a "marked improvement in speed" and began to reduce the deficit. As Cambridge had already moved in front of Oxford, they steered back towards the Surrey shore in preparation for shooting Hammersmith Bridge. In doing so, a collision ensued, causing Oxford to come to halt. Although Cambridge made a three-to-four length headstart, Oxford's subsequent pace combined with Cambridge's wayward steering reduced the gap and by the end of the race, the boats were nearly level.

Immediately upon the conclusion, the race umpire, Thomas Howard Fellows of Leander Club declared the result in favour of Oxford, disqualifying Cambridge for the foul. Cambridge, although believing the foul was against them, did not object to the decision. The Cambridge University Boat Club secretary Charles Bagot wrote: "It is much to be regretted that a foul should have taken place, as, besides rendering the race an imperfect test of the merits of the respective crews, it very much disturbed the harmony and good feeling which should exist between members of the rival Universities in such contests." As of 2021, it is the only time that the Boat Race has been decided by a disqualification.
