= William Houghton (naturalist) =

English naturalist and clergyman

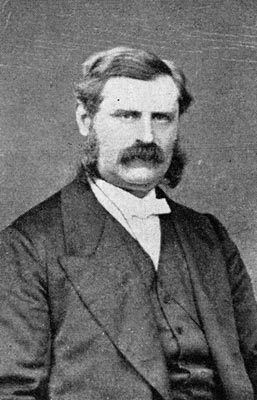
Rev. William Houghton

The Reverend William Houghton (1828–1895) was an English naturalist and clergyman, noted for being the author of British Fresh-Water Fishes.

== Life ==
Houghton was rector of Preston on the Weald Moors in Shropshire. A serious naturalist, he became a Fellow of the Linnean Society of London. To produce his major work, Houghton studied fish specimens at the British Museum.

== Bibliography ==
- British Fresh-Water Fishes (2 vols.) Alexander Francis Lydon (artist), Benjamin Fawcett (printer). William Mackenzie (publisher), London: 1879 : Colour plates of British fresh water fish in two volumes. The 41 colour plates generally show fish against a natural background or swimming in an underwater setting. The volumes show 38 engraved heading views of regions where the fish occur with diagrams. The text describes the species and their habitats. The volumes are bound in embossed covers with a vignette of an angler holding a fish and freshwater fish motifs in the corners.
- Country Walks of a Naturalist with his Children
- Sea-side Walks of a Naturalist
- Gleanings from the Natural History of the Ancients (1879)
