= Arthur A. Friedenson =

English painter

- Born: 1872; Leeds, England
- Died: 1955 (aged 82–83); Parkstone, England
- Known for: Landscape painting

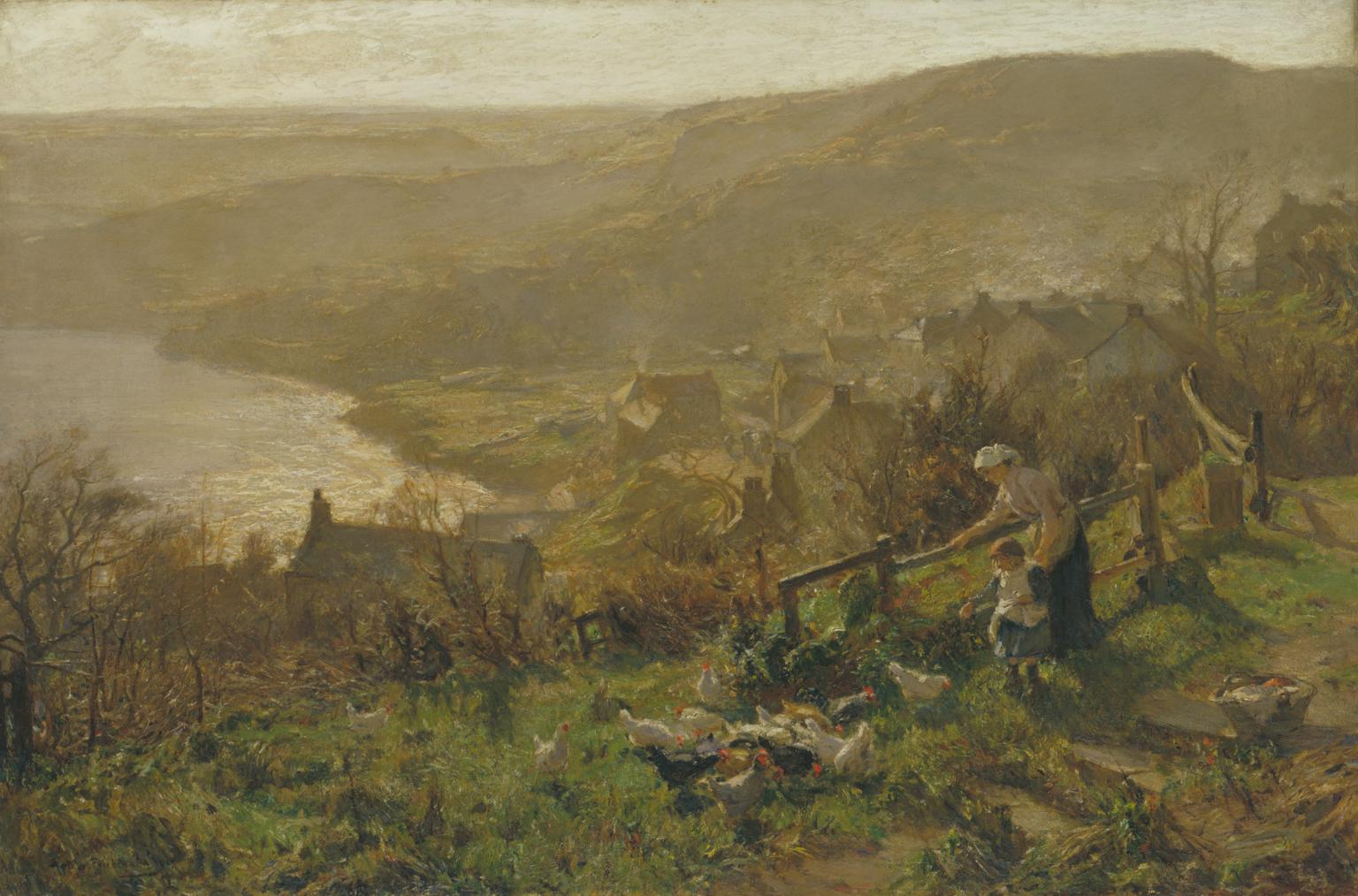
Runswick Bay (1907) by Friedenson

Arthur A. Friedenson (1872 – 1955) was an English painter. He is known for his landscape paintings and coastal scenes.

== Biography ==
Friedenson was born in Leeds in 1872. He studied study art at the Académie Julian in Paris as well as the Académie Royale des Beaux-Arts in Brussels.

Friedenson exhibited at the Royal Academy from 1889. He also had paintings shown at the Fine Arts Society and Goupil Gallery.

Friedenson died in 1910 at Parkstone in Dorset where he had been working for some time. His death followed years of poor health.
