= The Boat Race 1849 (March) =

9th Boat Race
- Date: 29 March 1849
- Winner: Cambridge
- Margin of victory: Easily
- Winning time: 22 minutes 0 seconds
- Overall record (Cambridge–Oxford): 7–2
- Umpire: J. C. Fellowes

The 9th Boat Race took place on the River Thames on 29 March 1849. Typically held annually, the event is a side-by-side rowing race between crews from the Universities of Oxford and Cambridge. The race was won by Cambridge who triumphed over Oxford "easily". As a result of the nature of the defeat, Oxford challenged Cambridge to a second race that year, which was to be held in December, the only time the Boat Race was competed for twice in a calendar year. Every member of the Cambridge crew came from Trinity College.

== Background ==
The Championship Course along which the Boat Race is competed

The Boat Race is a side-by-side rowing competition between the University of Oxford (sometimes referred to as the "Dark Blues") and the University of Cambridge (sometimes referred to as the "Light Blues"). The race was first held in 1829, and since 1845 has taken place on the 4.2-mile (6.8 km) Championship Course on the River Thames in southwest London. Cambridge went into the race leading overall with six victories to Oxford's two. They had beaten Oxford in the previous race, held in 1845, by three lengths.

Cambridge used an outrigged boat built by Searle, 62 feet 9 inches (19.1 m) in length and 26 inches (66 cm) in width, while the Dark Blues' boat was constructed by Hall of Oxford. The umpire for the race was J. C. Fellowes while the starter was Edward Searle.

== Crews ==
The Cambridge crew weighed an average of 11 st 2.5 lb (70.8 kg), just under 2 pounds (0.9 kg) per rower more than their opponents. Every rower from Cambridge was studying at Trinity College but all were new to the event; not one Blue returned from the 1846 race. F. Blomfield was replaced as the Light Blue cox by George Booth as a result of an accident. Oxford welcomed back E. C. Burton at number four and their cox, C.Soanes.

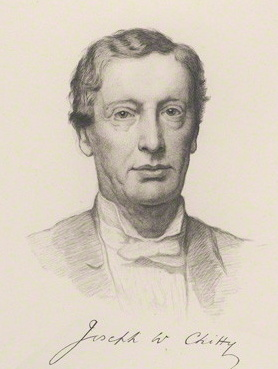
Joseph William Chitty rowed at number two for Oxford.

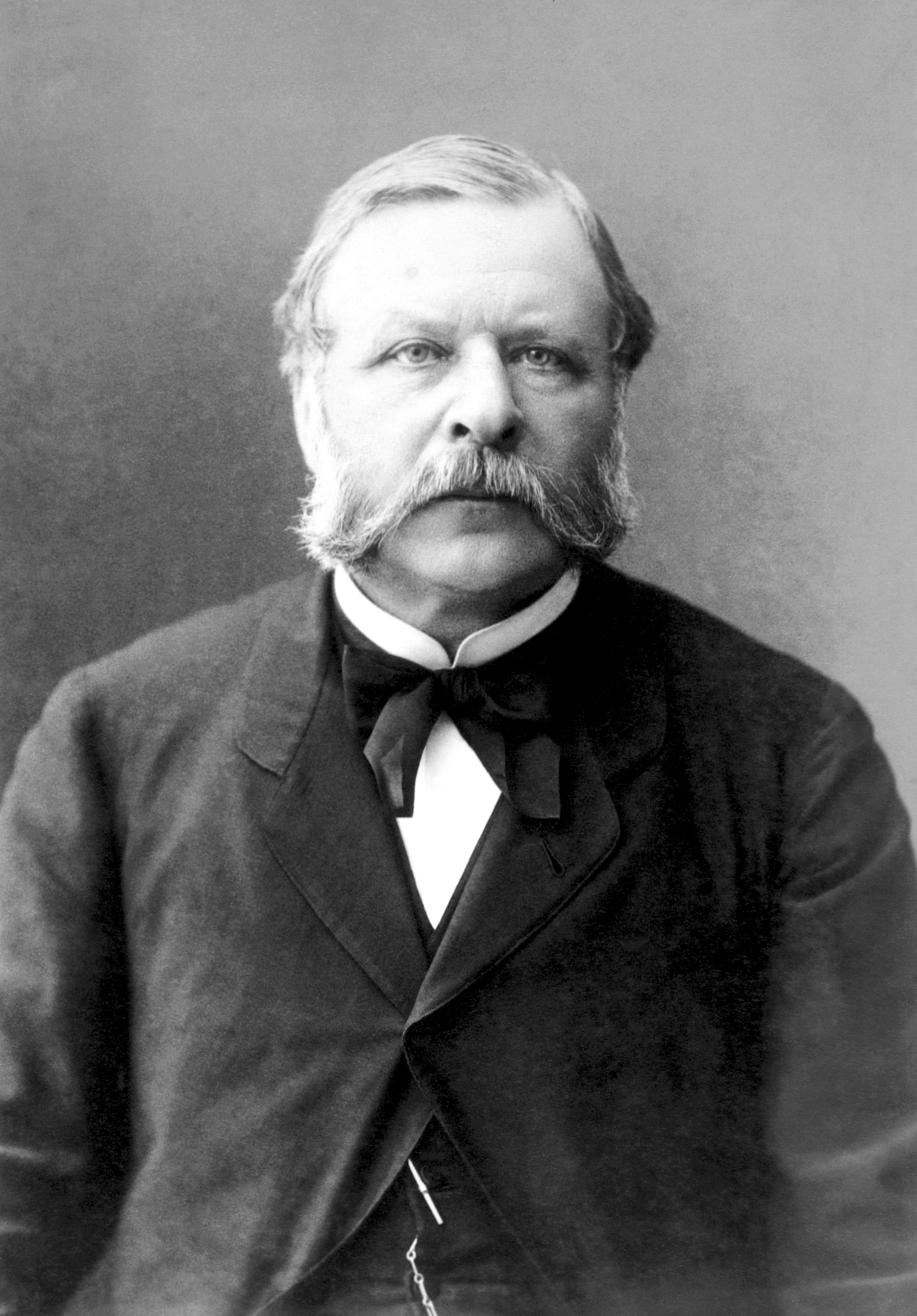
William Waddington rowed at number six for Cambridge.

Seat	Cambridge			Oxford		
Seat	Name	College	Weight	Name	College	Weight
Bow	H. Proby	2nd Trinity	9 st 13 lb	D. Wauchope	Wadham	10 st 4 lb
2	W. J. H. Jones	2nd Trinity	10 st 13 lb	J. W. Chitty	Balliol	11 st 2 lb
3	Albert De Rutzen	3rd Trinity	11 st 8 lb	H. H. Tremayne	Christ Church	11 st 5 lb
4	J. C. Holden	3rd Trinity	11 st 8 lb	E. C. Burton	Christ Church	11 st 0 lb
5	W. L. G. Bagshawe (P)	3rd Trinity	11 st 10 lb	Chas. Holden Steward	Oriel	12 st 0 lb
6	W. H. Waddington	2nd Trinity	11 st 10 lb	A. Mansfield	Christ Church	11 st 8 lb
7	W. C. Hodgson	1st Trinity	11 st 2 lb	J. J. Sykes	Worcester	11 st 0 lb
Stroke	J. Copley Wray	2nd Trinity	10 st 12 lb	W. G. Rich (P)	St John's	10 st 8 lb
Cox	George Booth	1st Trinity	10 st 7 lb	C. Soanes	St John's	10 st 8 lb
Source: (P) – boat club president

== Race ==
No words can express the excitement evinced by the crowds on the banks while the crews remained in this relative position for some moments. But when the Cambridge began to draw ahead, in the same manner as Oxford had previously passed them, the shrieks from the steamers were almost beyond description.

— MacMichael

Cambridge won the toss and elected to start from the Middlesex station. Just prior to the race, Oxford had suggested a foreshortening of the course, in order to avoid both crews having to pass through the narrow arches of Barnes Bridge; this was rejected by Cambridge and the conventional course was rowed. After a close start, Oxford pulled ahead and held a half-length lead by the time they passed the Star and Garter pub. By Hammersmith Bridge, the Oxford crew began to slow, their cox made an error in steering and Cambridge began to reduce the deficit. At Chiswick Eyot the crews were level once again, and Cambridge started to draw away. Several lengths ahead by Barnes Bridge, Cambridge won by around 60 seconds. The result meant that Cambridge led overall with seven victories to Oxford's two.

== Reaction ==
Three main factors were attributed with Oxford's substantial defeat. Firstly their stroke, and boat club president, William Rich had set such a high rating, he and his crew were unable to sustain it for the duration of the race, becoming quickly tired. Secondly, Rich himself suggested that Oxford's vessel was inadequate, calling it "a bad boat". Finally, poor steering had allowed Cambridge to pass them "like a shot".

Given the nature of the defeat, Oxford sent out a challenge in October 1849 to Cambridge for a re-row. For the first and only time in the history of the Boat Race, a second race was held in the same calendar year, this time in December. The race was won by Oxford, after Cambridge were disqualified.
