= Peter boat =

Type of fishing boat

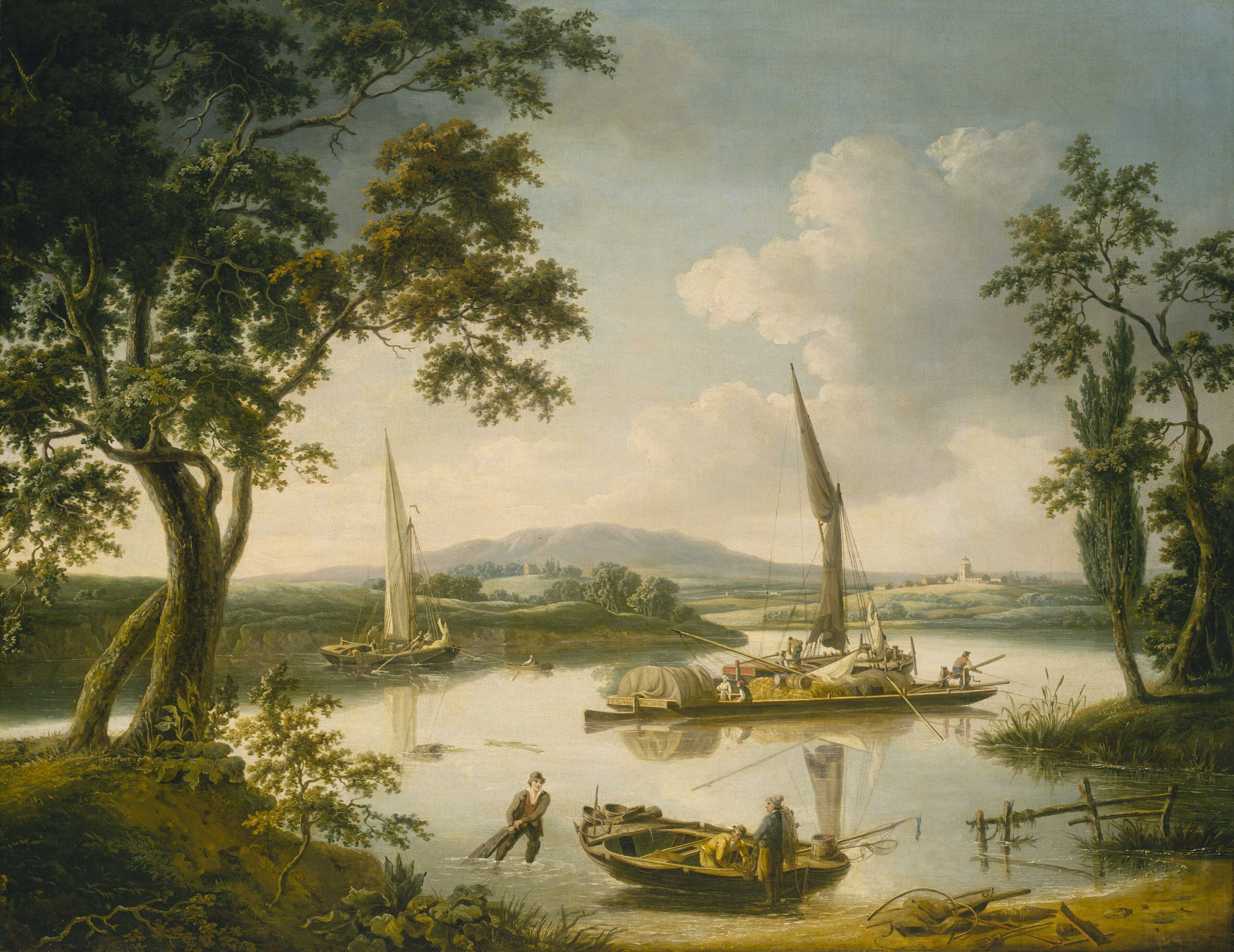
The Thames at Shillingford, 1823, an oil painting by John Thomas Serres. The small fishing boat in the foreground is a Peter boat.

A Peter Boat or Peterboat was a type of fishing boat, found principally on the Thames Estuary and the adjacent coasts of eastern England. In legend, the peter boat's origins may lie with the boats used to ferry passengers to and from St. Peter's Abbey, the Saxon predecessor to Westminster Abbey in London (the Abbey was originally on a small island called Thorney Island) or simply from St Peter, the patron saint of fishermen.

By the middle of the second millennium, a peter boat was a double ended rowing boat of about 12 feet (3.7 m) in length, usually used for fishing. A second type from about 18 feet to 28 feet (5.5m to 8.5m) was used below the Pool of London and had sails. Lower down the Thames the fishermen of Gravesend and Barking developed an estuary version and in summertime sailed to the Essex and Suffolk coasts, bringing back their live catch in wells.

The Peter Boat Inn, in Leigh-on-Sea near the mouth of the Thames Estuary, is named after this type of fishing boat.
