= Albert Strange =

Artist and yacht designer

- Albert Strange on his boat Cherub III, c. 1916
- Born: 29 June 1855; Gravesend
- Died: 11 July 1917 (aged 62); Scarborough, North Yorkshire
- Resting place: Hutton Buscel
- Known for: Yacht design

Albert Strange (1855–1917) was an English artist and yacht designer. He was the headmaster of the Scarborough School of Art. With George Holmes, he was a mainstay of the Humber Yawl Club which developed the use of sailing canoes with a yawl rig.

== Life and career ==
Albert Strange was born on 29 June 1855, growing up in Gravesend where he learned to sail with a fisherman who helped him convert a peter boat for cruising around the Thames Estuary. He studied art at the Slade School of Fine Art and the Leicester College of Arts and Crafts, completing his education in 1878. He then taught art in Liverpool for three years, where he married.

Circa 1882, Strange took a job as the headmaster of the new Scarborough School of Art — a position which he held for 35 years until his death on 11 July 1917. He exhibited at the Royal Academy, from 1882 to 1897.

== Scarborough and the Humber Yawl Club ==
For some years, Strange was captain of the Humber Yawl Club, (formed in 1883), shortly after his arrival in Scarborough about 50 miles to the north. He produced many designs for boats suited to the club's locale, both for himself and other members. They were light craft which would cope well with being beached on the mud flats of the Humber Estuary or being shipped abroad as deck cargo, but they had cabins which enabled them to be used for long voyages of a month or so. One of his designs was the 15m cutter rig yacht Tally Ho.

== Designs ==
Strange was one of the first designers to promote light displacement craft, specifically designed for cruising, rather than using designs based on working craft. He was a prolific and sought after designer and designed about 150 boats in all.

Plans for the Otter, designed in 1898 for a member of the Royal St. Lawrence Yacht Club to sail on the lower Saint Lawrence.

Sailing rig for the Otter

Albert Strange designed boats which have survived include Constance (design 45, rebuilt in 2006), Sheila (design 70, oldest surviving boat in commission), Sheila II (design 117), and Tally Ho (design 96, rebuilt 2024)

== Albert Strange Association ==
There is an active Association which has as its mission "to trace, record and, so far as it is within our power, preserve the designs, boats, art works and writings of Albert Strange, and to make a permanent record of his life and work." The Association holds Summer Meets (usually on the UK's East coast) where yachts built to Albert Strange designs meet, and share with others the opportunity to sail these craft. The Association's website contains much further information on his life and the breadth and diversity of his abilities; his success as an artist, yacht designer, raconteur and teacher of pupils across a wide range of ages.
