= Leslie Van Gelder =

American archaeologist

Leslie Van Gelder ONZM
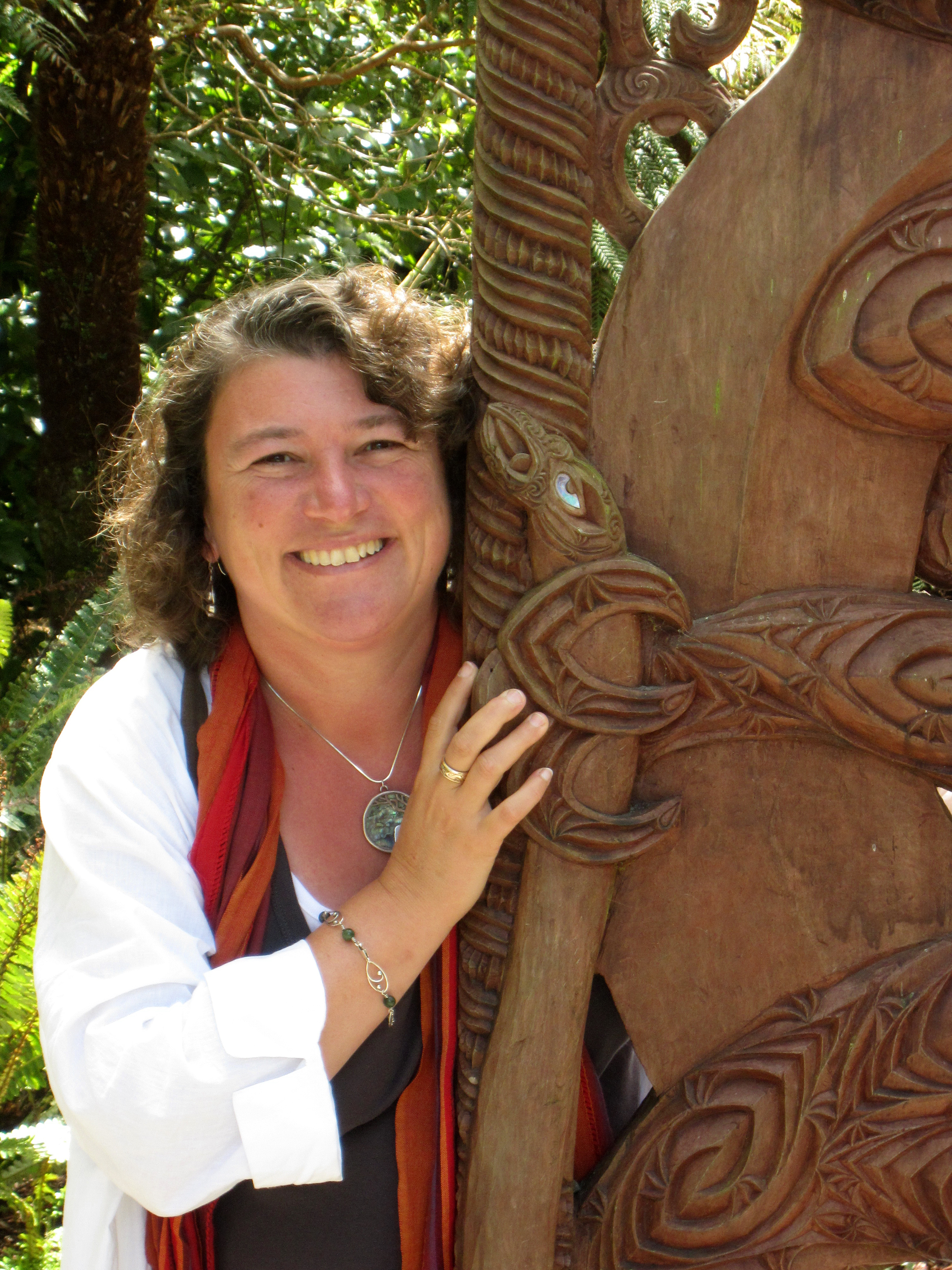
- Van Gelder in Pukeiriti, New Zealand
- Born: January 27, 1969 (age 57); Manhattan, New York, U.S.
- Occupations: Archaeologist, writer, educator
- Spouse: Kevin J. Sharpe
- Relatives: Gordon Van Gelder (brother); Russell Van Gelder (brother); Lawrence Van Gelder (uncle); Richard Van Gelder (father)

Leslie Gail Van Gelder ONZM (born January 27, 1969) is an American archaeologist, writer, and educator whose primary work involves the study of Paleolithic finger flutings in Rouffignac Cave and Gargas Cave in southern France.

== Biography ==
Van Gelder was born in 1969 in Manhattan. As daughter of American Museum of Natural History curator Richard Van Gelder, she spent periods of her childhood involved in field work with him in East Africa and in the U.S. National Parks. From 1985 to 1989 she worked for the Quebec-Labrador Foundation teaching environmental education in outport communities in eastern Canada. Later she taught high school in northern New Jersey and left in 1998 to pursue a PhD in Place Studies at the Union Institute and University for which she was the recipient of the Sussman Award. Her work in Place Studies appeared in a number of journals including the Journal of Implicit Religion, Nature in Story and Legend, Green Letters, as well as within the monograph Weaving a Way Home: A Personal Journey of Place and Story published by the University of Michigan Press 2008.

She is the facilitator of the Roundstone Conversation on Place and Story which has, since 2004, annually brought together writers on the subject of Place and Story to the home of writer cartographer Tim Robinson. Past attendees have included Joseph Meeker, Ron Engel, Patrick Curry, John Elder, Moya Cannon, Patricia Monaghan, Nuala O'Faolin among others.

Working with her husband, the late archaeologist and theologian Kevin J. Sharpe, she spent 10 years developing methodologies to study finger flutings. Their work, building on the internal analysis concepts established by Alexander Marshack, was the first to be able to establish unique identities of cave artists through the study of individual hands and the application of finger digit ratio 2D:4D studies. Their work on finger flutings was the first to show symbolic behavior by children in the Paleolithic through the creation of tectiforms in Rouffignac. Later work showed the role of women and children in the creation of cave art in Rouffignac. Their application of Zipf's Law from communications theory also gave the first replicable methodology for determining whether or not fluted panels represented purposeful communication or a proto form of writing.

Van Gelder continues to research in Rouffignac and Gargas caves and lectures internationally. Her current research focuses on the role of children in both caves. She is a Program Director at Walden University's Richard W. Riley College of Education and Leadership.

In 2008, she moved to the Rees Valley of New Zealand near the community of Glenorchy. As of 2025 Gelder is resident in Glenorchy, New Zealand, and is the chairperson of both the Glenorchy Heritage and Museum Group and the Glenorchy Dark Skies Sanctuary Group. She has led the Dark Skies Group since 2019 when the initial idea of establishing a certified dark sky place in Glenorchy was formed. After five years of work, the Tāhuna Glenorchy Dark Sky Sanctuary was certified by DarkSky International on February 3, 2025.

Gelder has been active in conservation in the region, and has served as executive officer of the Whakatipu Wildlife Trust. She is also co-chair of the Southern Lakes Sanctuary, and chairperson of the Queenstown-Lakes District Council climate reference group.

Van Gelder (left), after her investiture as an Officer of the New Zealand Order of Merit by the governor-general, Dame Cindy Kiro, at Government House, Wellington, on 18 September 2026

In the 2026 King's Birthday Honours, Van Gelder was appointed an Officer of the New Zealand Order of Merit, for services to conservation and dark sky sanctuaries.

== Family ==
Gelder was married to archaeologist and theologian, Kevin Sharpe until his death in 2008. Richard Van Gelder, curator of Mammalogy at the American Museum of Natural History, was her father. Lawrence Van Gelder, her uncle, was a senior editor at The New York Times until his retirement in 2008. Her brother, Gordon Van Gelder, is a Hugo Award-winning science fiction editor. Her brother Russell Van Gelder is chairman of ophthalmology at the University of Washington.

== Publications ==
- 2004: Childhood in the church of Darwin. In Progress and Process. Terra Nova Monograph Series. Cambridge Mass: MIT Press.
- 2004: Children and Paleolithic 'art': indications from Rouffignac Cave, France. International Newsletter on Rock Art 38:9–17. (With Kevin Sharpe)
- Van Gelder, L. (2004). "At the Confluence of Paradox". Implicit Religion. 7 (3): 207–227. doi:10.1558/imre.7.3.207.66315. Wikidata Q136131408.
- 2005: The gift of the anthropomorphic mind. Nature in Story and Legend. Fall: 8–13.
- 2005: Techniques for studying finger flutings. Society of Primitive Technology Bulletin 30, 68–74. (With Kevin Sharpe)
- 2006: A method for studying finger flutings. In Exploring the Mind of Ancient Man: Festschrift to Robert G. Bednarik, ed. P. Chenna Reddy. New Delhi: Research India Press.
- Sharpe, K.; Van Gelder, L. (2006). "The Study of Finger Flutings". Cambridge Archaeological Journal. 16 (03): 281. doi:10.1017/s0959774306000175. Wikidata Q60028072.
- Sharpe, K.; Van Gelder, L. (2006). "Finger flutings in chamber A1 of Rouffignac Cave, France". Rock Art Research. 23 (2). ISSN 0813-0426. Wikidata Q136131370.
- Sharpe, K.; Van Gelder, L. (2006). "Evidence for cave marking by Palaeolithic children". Antiquity. 80 (310): 937–947. doi:10.1017/s0003598x00094527. Wikidata Q136131110.
- Sharpe, K.; Van Gelder, L. (2007). "More about 'More about finger flutings'". Rock Art Research. 24 (1): 133. ISSN 0813-0426. Wikidata Q136131070.
- Sharpe, K.; Van Gelder, L. (2007). "Human Uniqueness and Upper Paleolithic 'Art': An Archaeologist's Reaction to Wentzel van Huyssteen's 'Gifford Lectures.'". American Journal of Theology and Philosophy. 28 (3): 311–345. JSTOR 27944416. Wikidata Q136130978.
- Van Gelder, L. (2008). Weaving a Way Home: A Personal Journey Exploring Place and Story. University of Michigan Press. doi:10.3998/mpub.183572. ISBN 978-0-472-11642-3. LCCN 2007037352. OCLC 172521708. Wikidata Q136130938.
- 2009: When the stories fled. Irish Pages. 4:2.
- Van Gelder, L.; Sharpe, K. (2009). "Women and Girls as Upper Palaeolithic cave 'artists': Deciphering the sexes of finger fluters in Rouffignac Cave". Oxford Journal of Archaeology. 28 (4): 323–333. doi:10.1111/j.1468-0092.2009.00331.x. Wikidata Q136130930.
- Sharpe, K.; Van Gelder, L. (2009). "Paleolithic finger flutings as efficient communication: Applying Zipf's Law to two panels in Rouffignac Cave, France". Semiotica. 2009 (177). doi:10.1515/semi.2009.071. Wikidata Q136108932.
- 2010: Paleolithic finger flutings and the question of writing. In Whitehouse, R & Piquette, K. (eds). The materiality of writing. London: Cambria Press.
- 2010: New methods and approaches in the study of finger flutings. Proceedings from the IFRAO Conference: Pleistocene Art of the World. September 6–11, 2010.
- 2010: Ten years in Rouffignac Cave, France: A collective report on a decade of finger flutings research. Proceedings from the IFRAO Conference: Pleistocene Art of the World. September 6–11, 2010.
- 2010: Four forms of finger flutings as seen in Rouffignac Cave, France. In Bahn, P. (ed). An enquiring mind: Studies in honor of Alexander Marshack. Oxford: Oxbow Books, 269–285. (With Kevin Sharpe)
- 2010: Fluted Animals in the Zone of Crevices, Gargas Cave, France. Proceedings of the Eleventh Congress of the International Federation of Rock Art Organizations, Lisbon, Portugal, September 4–9, 2006. (With Kevin Sharpe)
- Van Gelder, L. (2013). "New Methods and Approaches in the Study of Finger Flutings". Palethnologie. 5 (5). doi:10.4000/palethnologie.4643. Wikidata Q136108921.
- Van Gelder, L. (2013). "Ten Years in Rouffignac Cave: a Collective Report on Findings from a Decade of Finger Flutings Research". Palethnologie. 5 (5). doi:10.4000/palethnologie.2600. Wikidata Q136108925.
- Van Gelder, L. (2014). "Paleolithic Finger Flutings and the Question of Writing". Time and Mind. 7 (2): 141–153. doi:10.1080/1751696x.2014.887344. Wikidata Q136108904.
- Van Gelder, L. (2015). "Counting the Children: The Role of Children in the Production of Finger Flutings in Four Upper Palaeolithic Caves". Oxford Journal of Archaeology. 34 (2): 119–138. doi:10.1111/ojoa.12052. Wikidata Q56845824.
- Van Gelder, L. (2015). "The Role of Children in the Creation of Finger Flutings in Koonalda Cave, South Australia". Childhood in the Past. 8 (2): 149–160. doi:10.1179/1758571615z.00000000036. Wikidata Q57687312.
