= Richard Van Gelder =

American mammalogist (1928–1994)

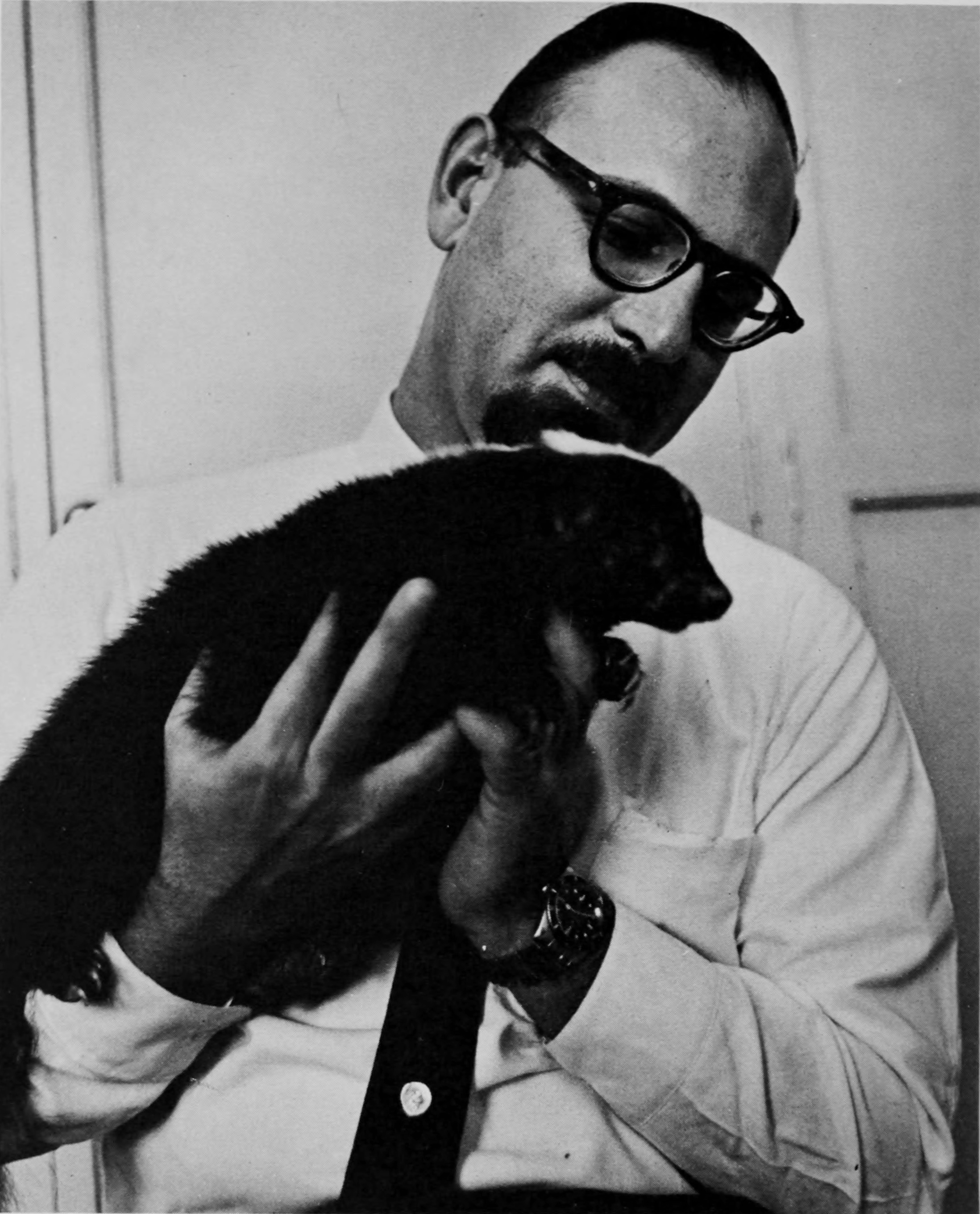
- Van Gelder c. 1969
- Born: December 17, 1928; U.S.
- Died: February 23, 1994 (aged 65); U.S.
- Education: Colorado A&M (Undergraduate) University of Illinois (PhD, Zoology) Kansas State University (Postdoctoral Fellowship)
- Children: Russell Van Gelder; Gordon Van Gelder; Leslie Van Gelder
- Scientific career
- Fields: Mammalogy

Richard George Van Gelder (December 17, 1928 – February 23, 1994) was an American mammalogist who served as the Curator of Mammalogy for the American Museum of Natural History in New York for more than twenty-five years.

== Career ==
In 1957, while on the Puritan Expedition to the Baja Peninsula, he discovered a new species of vesper bat commonly known as Van Gelder's Bat.

Among his accomplishments at the Museum of Natural History was the 1969 redesign of the Hall of Ocean Life featuring the blue whale which still hangs in the center of the hall. Among his colleagues in the Mammal Department at the AMNH were Karl Koopman, Marie A. Lawrence, Guy Musser, and Sydney Anderson.

His later research included the study of the nyala in Mozambique. He was a President of the American Society of Mammalogists from 1968 to 1970. He also served on the New Jersey Endangered and Non-Game Species Council in the 1980s.

He was the author of a number of mammalogy books including Biology of Mammals and Mammals of the National Parks as well as a large range of mammal related children's books such as Bats, Animals in Winter, The Professor and the Mysterious Box, The Professor and the Vanishing Flags, Monkeys and Apes, and Whose Nose Is This? He died in 1994 of acute monocytic leukemia.

== Published works ==
- A Taxonomic Revision of the Spotted Skunks (genus Spilogale) (1959)
- New Antrozous (Mammalia, Vespertilionidae) from the Tres Marías Islands, Nayarit, Mexico - by Richard George Van Gelder; Richard George Zweifel; Oakes Plimpton (Puritan-American Museum of Natural History Expedition to Western Mexico - 1957) (1959)
- Marine Mammals from the Coasts of Baja California and the Tres Marías Islands, Mexico (Puritan Expedition) (1960)
- The Taxonomy and Status of Bats in Bermuda - by Richard George Van Gelder; David B. Wingate (1961)
- Physiological Mammalogy edited by William V. Mayer and Richard G. Van Gelder (1963)
- Animals in Winter by Henrietta Bancroft and Richard G. Van Gelder. Illustrated by Gaetano di Palma (1963, reissued in 1997)
- The Professor and the Mysterious Box - Illustrated by Harriett (Harvey House, 1964)
- Professor and the Vanishing Flags - Illustrated by Harriett (Harvey House, 1965)
- Bats - Illustrated by Tom Dolan (Follett, 1967)
- The Genus Conepatus (Mammalia, Mustelidae) : variation within a population - by Richard George Van Gelder; Hilde Kipp (1967)
- Biology of Mammals (Scribner, 1969)
- Monkeys and Apes - Illustrated by Walter Ferguson (Follett, 1970)
- "Whale on My Back" in Curator XIII (1970)
- Animals & Man, Past, Present, Future - Illustrated by John R. Lane. (1972)
- Whose Nose Is This? (Walker & Co., 1974)
- The Natural History of Nyala, Tragelaphus Angasi (Mammalia, Bovidae) in Mozambique - by José L. P. Lobão Tello and Richard G. Van Gelder (1975)
- Mammalian Hybrids and Generic Limits (1977)
- A Review of Canid Classification (1978)
- Talking to Animals: A New Look at Coloration (North Dakota State University, 1980)
- Mammals of the National Parks (Johns Hopkins University Press, 1982)
- State of the Mammals (Mammals in New Jersey) (1985)
- When Winter Comes (1987)
- The Gorilla Wore Pants: A Somewhat Magnified Exploration of the Ethnology and Ethology of a Natural History Museum (unpublished)

== Personal life ==
- Russell Van Gelder, his son, is chairman of the Department of Ophthalmology at University of Washington School of Medicine, and past president of the American Academy of Ophthalmology
- Gordon Van Gelder, his son, is the publisher and former editor of The Magazine of Fantasy and Science Fiction.
- Leslie Van Gelder, his daughter, is an archaeologist researching prehistoric Finger fluting.
- Lawrence Van Gelder, Van Gelder's brother, was a senior editor at The New York Times.
