= Alden 44 =

Sailboat class

Development
- Designer: Niels Helleberg
- Location: United States
- Year: 1976
- No. built: 40
- Builder: Alden Yachts/Tillotson Pearson
- Role: Racer
- Name: Alden 44

Boat
- Displacement: 24,500 lb (11,113 kg)
- Draft: 8.75 ft (2.67 m), with centerboard down

Hull
- Type: Monohull
- Construction: Fiberglass
- LOA: 44.16 ft (13.46 m)
- LWL: 34.08 ft (10.39 m)
- Beam: 12.50 ft (3.81 m)
- Engine: Perkins Engines 4-108 diesel engine

Hull appendages
- Keel: fin keel with centerboard
- Ballast: 10,000 lb (4,536 kg)
- Rudder: skeg-mounted rudder

Rig
- Rig type: Bermuda rig
- I foretriangle height: 54.10 ft (16.49 m)
- J foretriangle base: 19.30 ft (5.88 m)
- P mainsail luff: 47.10 ft (14.36 m)
- E mainsail foot: 14.80 ft (4.51 m)

Sails
- Sailplan: Cutter rigged sloop
- Mainsail area: 348.54 sq ft (32.380 m^{2})
- Jib/genoa area: 522.07 sq ft (48.502 m^{2})
- Total sail area: 870.61 sq ft (80.882 m^{2})

Racing
- D-PN: 79.4
- PHRF: 99

The Alden 44 is an American sailboat that was designed by Alden Associates and Niels Helleberg as an International Offshore Rule racer and first built in 1976.

== Production ==
The design was built by Tillotson Pearson in the United States for Alden Yachts, but it is now out of production.

== Design ==
The Alden 44 is a recreational keelboat, built predominantly of fiberglass, with wood trim. It has a raked stem, a raised counter reverse transom, a skeg-mounted rudder controlled by a wheel, aluminum spars and a fixed stub fin keel, with a retractable centerboard. It displaces 24,500 lb (11,113 kg) and carries 10,000 lb (4,536 kg) of lead ballast.

The boat has a variety of possible interior layouts, but typical is sleeping accommodation for seven people, with a double "V"-berth in the bow cabin, an L-shaped settee, with a drop-leaf table and a straight settee, plus a pilot berth in the main cabin and an aft cabin with two berths. The aft cabin has its own companionway ladder from the cockpit. The galley is located on the starboard side beside the forward companionway ladder with the double sink located underneath the steps. The galley is equipped with a propane-fired three-burner stove and oven as well as a 6 cu ft (0.17 m^{3}) refrigerator and a 4 cu ft (0.11 m^{3}) freezer. The large head is located just forward of the aft cabin on the port side, with access from the aft cabin and the main cabin. It includes a shower. Main cabin trim is of ash wood.

Ventilation is provided by five translucent hatches and seven opening ports.

For sailing the design is equipped with two winches for the main halyard, two for the genoa halyard, two for the spinnaker halyard and two for the staysail halyard, two primary and two secondary winches for the genoa sheets, two for the staysail sheets, two for the mainsheet, two for the spinnaker sheets and one for the outhaul. The majority of the installed winches are self-tailing. The design also has a topping lift.

== Variants ==
Alden 44
This cutter rig model was designed by Niels Helleberg and introduced in 1976. It was designated as Alden design #1036xx. It remained in production until 1991, with 40 examples completed. It has a length overall of 44.16 ft (13.5 m) and has a waterline length of 34.08 ft (10.4 m). The boat has a draft of 8.75 ft (2.67 m) with the centreboard extended and 4.92 ft (1.50 m) with it retracted. The boat is fitted with a Perkins Engines 4-108 diesel engine. The fuel tank holds 90 U.S. gallons (340 L; 75 imp gal) and the fresh water tank has a capacity of 160 U.S. gallons (610 L; 130 imp gal). A tall rig was also available, with a mast about 2.9 ft (0.88 m) higher. The staysail is boom-mounted. Both the staysail and its stay are removed for racing and it is sailed as a masthead sloop. The design has a PHRF racing average handicap of 99 and a Portsmouth Yardstick of 79.4.
Alden 44 MII
This later masthead sloop model was designed by Alden Yachts and introduced in 1981. It incorporates a different rudder and skeg configuration and moves the propeller forward, out of the skeg slot. A new interior layout was also introduced. The design has a length overall of 44.16 ft (13.5 m) and has a waterline length of 34.92 ft (10.6 m). The boat has a draft of 8.80 ft (2.68 m) with the centreboard extended and 4.90 ft (1.49 m) with it retracted. The boat is fitted with a Japanese Yanmar diesel engine.

== Operational history ==
In a 1994 review Richard Sherwood wrote, "The Alden [44] is designed for IOR competition but has many cruising amenities. The hull is moderate displacement. She is claimed to be fast, dry, stiff, and close-winded."

Reviewer Steve Knauth described the design in 2014, in Soundings, "the 44 was different from the old schooners, with its cutter rig, keel/centerboard and skeg-hung rudder. Yet it was perfectly in the Alden tradition of racing/cruising yachts. The boat could handle a crew of seven — enough for a Bermuda Race — and its competitive qualities were soon apparent. The Alden 44 quickly established a reputation for bluewater racing and passagemaking." He concludes that it "remains one of the prettiest sailboats you'll see in any harbor."

== See also ==
- List of sailing boat types

Similar sailboats

- Nauticat 44
- Worldcruiser 44
