= Gordon Van Gelder =

American science fiction editor

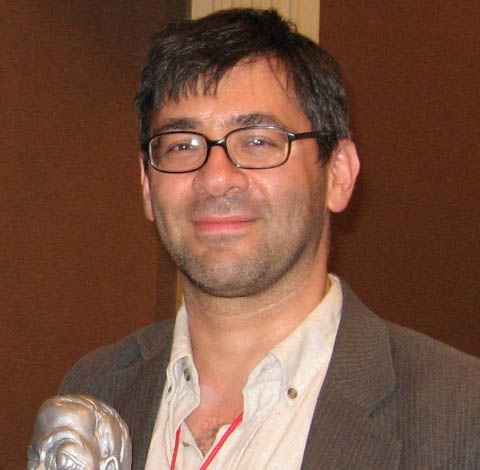
- Born: 1966 (age 59–60)
- Occupation: Publisher
- Relatives: Leslie Van Gelder (sister); Russell Van Gelder (brother); Lawrence Van Gelder (uncle); Richard Van Gelder (father)
- Website: sfsite.com/fsf

Gordon Van Gelder (born 1966) is an American science fiction editor. From 1997 until 2014, Van Gelder was editor and later publisher of The Magazine of Fantasy & Science Fiction, for which he has twice won the Hugo Award for Best Editor Short Form. He was also a managing editor of The New York Review of Science Fiction from 1988 to 1993, for which he was nominated for the Hugo Award a number of times. In 2015, Van Gelder stepped down as editor of Fantasy & Science Fiction in favor of Charles Coleman Finlay, and remained publisher until early 2025.

== Biography ==
He was born in 1966. After graduating from Princeton University (where he edited a science fiction magazine called Infinity), Van Gelder started working as an editorial assistant at St. Martin's Press in 1988, later rising to full editor. In January 1997, he became the editor of The Magazine of Fantasy & Science Fiction upon the resignation of Kristine Kathryn Rusch. He continued working at St. Martin's until October 2000, when he bought the magazine from Edward L. Ferman to become its publisher.

During his tenure, F&SF became the second longest-running science fiction magazine, surpassing Amazing Stories in total number of issues published. It is exceeded only by Astounding/Analog. Van Gelder also began focusing on the publication of themed anthologies drawing from the magazine's back list rather than the best-of annuals published when Ferman was the magazine's publisher. He later edited a collection of notable stories from F&SF, The Very Best of Fantasy & Science Fiction, published by Tachyon Publications.

Van Gelder has made some behind-the-scenes changes to F&SF. While the Fermans published the magazine through Mercury Press, Van Gelder founded his own press, Spilogale Inc., named for a genus of spotted skunk. He has also moved the editorial offices from New York City to Jersey City, New Jersey. Van Gelder currently lives in Hoboken, New Jersey. He has been an administrator of the Philip K. Dick Award since 1995 and an administrator of the World Fantasy Award since 2014. In 2011, OR Books released an anthology edited by Van Gelder, Welcome to the Greenhouse: Science Fiction on Climate Change, with an introduction by journalist Elizabeth Kolbert.

== Family ==
Richard Van Gelder, his father, was Curator of Mammalogy at the American Museum of Natural History. Lawrence Van Gelder, an uncle of Van Gelder, was a senior editor at The New York Times until his retirement in 2008.

Van Gelder is also distantly related to noted jazz recording engineer Rudy Van Gelder.

== Bibliography ==
=== Books ===
- Van Gelder, Gordon, ed. (2003). One Lamp: Alternate History Stories from the Magazine of Science Fiction and Fantasy. New York: Four Walls Eight Windows.
- Van Gelder, Gordon, ed. (2004). In Lands That Never Were: Tales of Swords and Sorcery. New York: Thunder's Mouth Press.
- Van Gelder, Gordon, ed. (2005). Fourth Planet from the Sun: Tales of Mars from the Magazine of Fantasy and Science Fiction. New York: Thunder's Mouth Press.
- Van Gelder, Gordon, ed. (2009). The Very Best of Fantasy and Science Fiction: Sixtieth Anniversary Anthology. San Francisco: Tachyon Press.
- Van Gelder, Gordon, ed. (2011). Welcome to the Greenhouse: New Science Fiction on Climate Change. New York: OR Books.
- Van Gelder, Gordon, ed. (2014). The Very Best of Fantasy and Science Fiction, Volume Two. San Francisco: Tachyon Press.
- Van Gelder, Gordon, ed. (2017). Go Forth and Multiply: Twelve Tales of Repopulation. Vancleave, MS: Surinam Turtle Press/Ramble House.
- Van Gelder, Gordon, ed. (2018). Welcome to Dystopia: Forty-Five Visions of What Lies Ahead. New York: OR Books.

=== Articles ===
- F&SF editorials.
- "A Few Thoughts on Jack Cady's The Off Season" October 1, 2015.
- "The New Yorker Festival Panel 'Nouveau Science Fiction'" Locus, November 2015.
