= John Taylor Snite House =

Historic house in Illinois, United States

- U.S. National Register of Historic Places
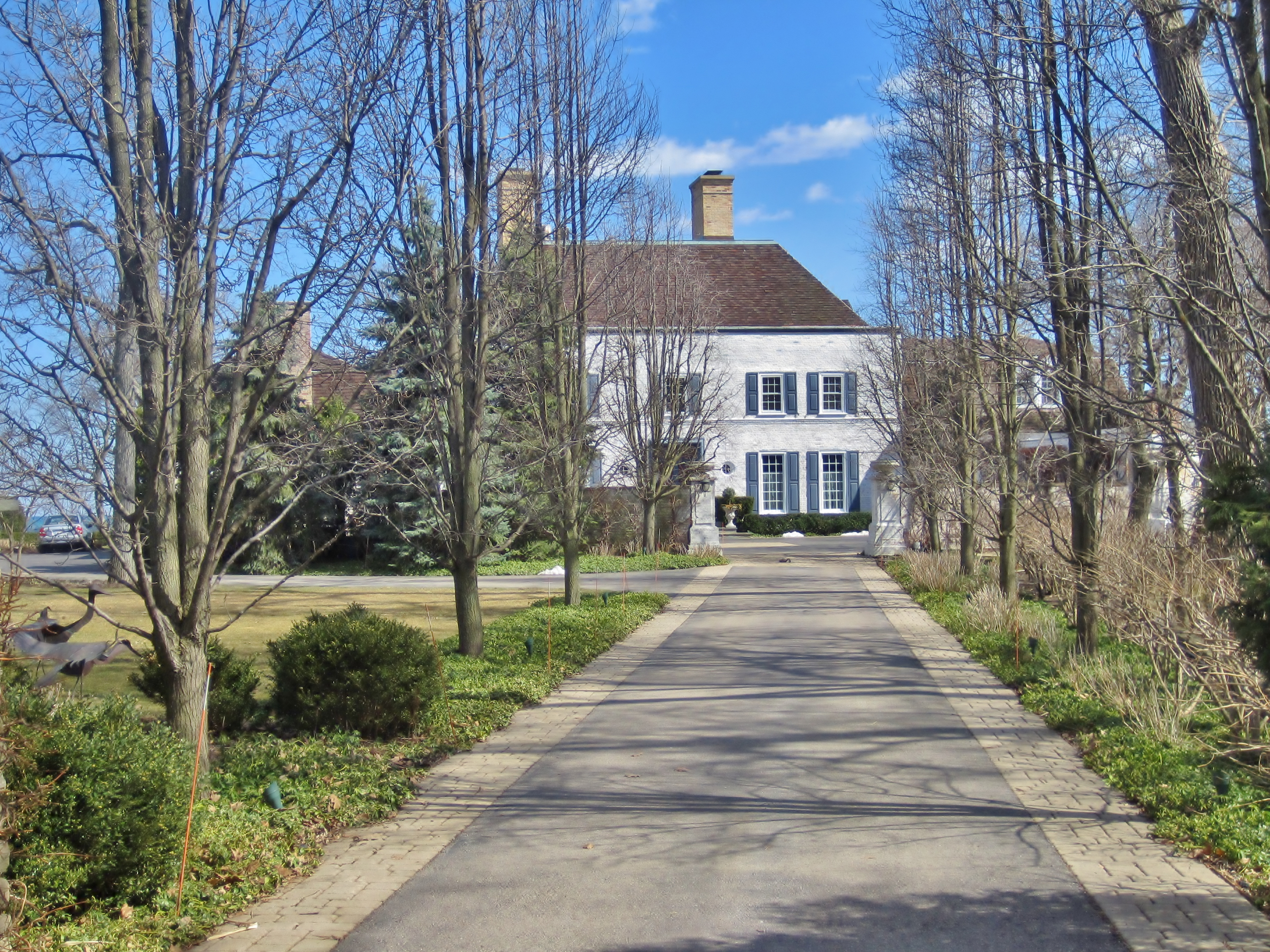

- Location within Illinois Location within the United States
- Location: 225 N. Deere Park Ave. E, Highland Park, Illinois
- Coordinates: 42°9′29″N 87°45′42″W
- Area: 1.3 acres (0.53 ha)
- Built: 1937
- Architect: Cerny, Jerome, Robert
- Architectural style: Renaissance, Art Deco
- MPS: Highland Park MRA
- NRHP reference No.: 03000790
- Added to NRHP: August 19, 2003

The John Taylor Snite House is an architecturally-significant house in Highland Park, Illinois, United States. It was built for John Taylor Snite, a prominent businessman and sailor.

== History ==
The Snite house was built in Braeside, one of the last areas on the east side of Highland Park, Illinois to be developed. The land had been in the possession of early settlers and wasn't sold for development until the 1920s. Baird & Warner was commissioned to subdivide the property that had belonged to Charles H. Deere (son of John Deere) in 1924. The Deere Park Subdivision was created that year with strict guidelines on what kinds of residences could be built.

John Taylor and Katherine Snite purchased Lot 25 in Deere Park on January 6, 1936. Snite was the son of the founder of the Imperial Credit Corporation of Chicago. Snite would serve as Chief Financial Officer and president of the company. Snite was an avid sailor and wanted a house with a "ship room" to hold his yacht, The Bagheera, and his sailing trophies. The ship, designed by John Alden, sailed in the Bermuda Race and twice won the Chicago Yacht Club Race to Mackinac (1929 and 1932). Snite served as a sailing instructor at nearby Naval Station Great Lakes during World War II.

The house was designed by Jerome Cerny, who designed over 700 houses over his thirty-five year career. A protégé of David Adler, Cerny specialized in country houses. The Snite house was one of Cerny's first to incorporate modern design aesthetics. The house is predominantly châteauesque but includes some Art Deco and Streamline Moderne elements. The Architectural Record praised the house in 1940 for this transitional character.

Snite sold the house in 1947 and moved to Wilmette and Winnetka, Illinois. They then retired to La Jolla, California in 1972. The Harris family purchased the Deere Park house in 1947. R. Niesen Harris was an executive at a chemical products company and was a prominent socialite, entertaining Doris Day, Cary Grant, Louis Armstrong, and Debbie Reynolds at the house. The Harris family extended the property in 1956 and made some minor additions, including a fallout shelter. The house was recognized by the National Park Service with a listing on the National Register of Historic Places on August 19, 2003. The Bagheera, now in Portland, Maine, was similarly recognized on November 4, 2009.
