= Snite =

Snite may refer to:

- Betsy Snite (1938–1984), American alpine ski racer
- Snite Museum of Art at the University of Notre Dame, Indiana, U.S.
- John Taylor Snite House in Illinois, U.S.
