= Puritan (schooner) =

Gaff-rigged schooner built in 1930

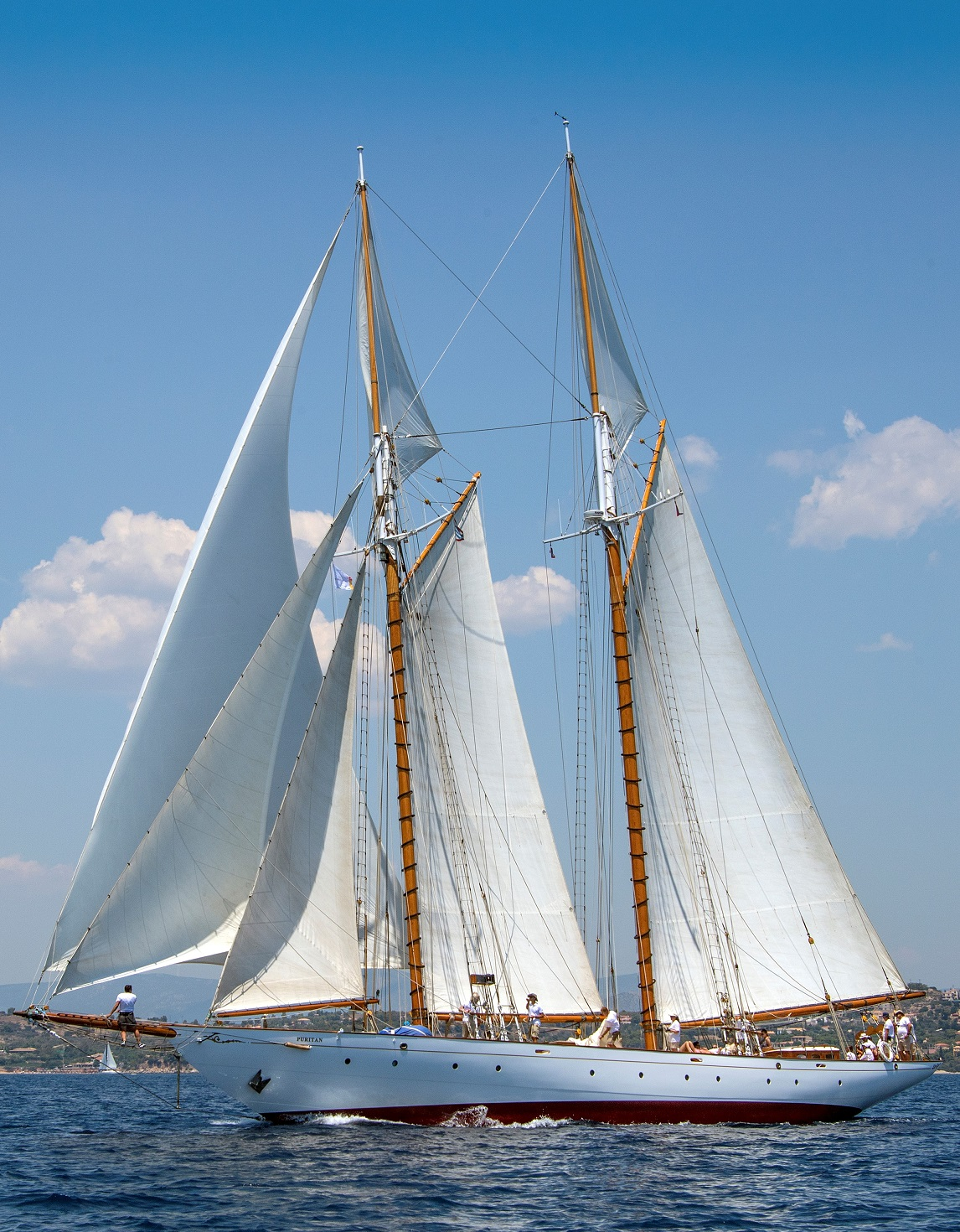
- Puritan sailing in the Spetses Classic Regatta in 2017

History

United Kingdom
- Name: Puritan
- Operator: The Classic Yacht Experience
- Builder: Electric Boat Company
- Launched: 1931
- Identification: U.S. Official Number: 230644; Signal: KMIV
- Status: In service

General characteristics
- Type: Schooner
- Tonnage: 101 GRT, 81 NRT
- Length: 126 ft (38 m); 102 ft (31 m) (registry)
- Beam: 23 ft (7.0 m); 21.9 ft (6.7 m) (1933 registry)
- Draft: 9 ft (2.7 m)
- Depth of hold: 11.5 ft (3.5 m)
- Sail plan: Gaff-rigged
- Speed: 9.5 knots (17.6 km/h; 10.9 mph)
- Capacity: 8
- Crew: 7

The Puritan is a 126-foot (38 m) gaff-rigged schooner designed by naval architect John Alden and built in 1930. Originally owned by Edward W. Brown in 1929, it was used as a patrol schooner by the United States Navy during World War II. The Puritan has been used mainly as a charter vessel and undergone numerous restorations. It is operated by The Classic Yacht Experience and used as a charter in the Mediterranean Sea.

== History ==
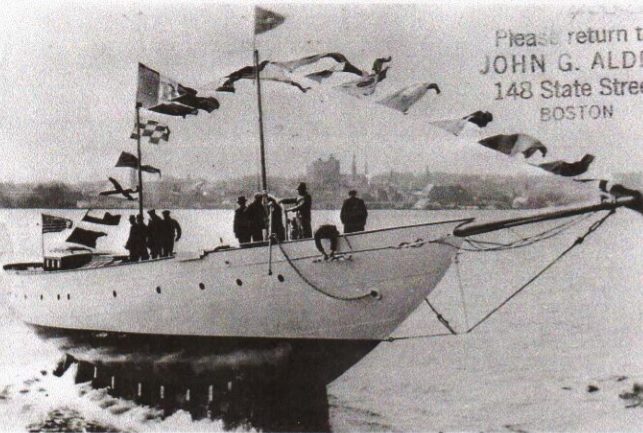
Puritan being launched in 1931

The Puritan was built by the Electric Boat Company in 1930. The plans for the schooner were originally presented to Edward W. Brown by naval architect John Alden in 1929. The ship was completed in 1931 and was the only pleasure boat built by the Electric Boat Company during that period due to the beginning of the Great Depression. The ship was christened in 1931 and made its maiden voyage from New London, Connecticut, to Oyster Bay.

The Puritan was put up for sale in 1932 after the death of Edward Brown. It was purchased in 1933 by Harry Bauer, the president of Southern California Edison, for $35,000. He sailed the ship from the eastern United States to California by way of the Panama Canal. Sterling Hayden, only seventeen at the time, was a passenger on the journey and would later write about it in his 1963 autobiography, Wanderer. Bauer sold the Puritan for $1 to the United States Navy on 7 December 1941, the day of the Attack on Pearl Harbor. The Dictionary of American Naval Fighting Ships state the vessel was acquired on 3 May 1942 and commissioned on 19 May.

Beginning active duty with the U.S. Navy, commissioned as USS Puritan (IX-69), the schooner was assigned to the Western Sea Frontier, 11th Naval District in San Diego, California. Fear of Japanese attack had reached a zenith on the west coast by 1942. As part of the San Diego Coastal Patrol, Puritan kept vigil against such threats throughout her naval career. Puritan had but a brief tour with the U.S. Navy and was placed out of service at San Diego on 27 September 1943. The schooner was struck from the Navy Register on 28 June 1944 and transferred to the War Shipping Administration for return to her former owner on 18 November 1944.

Bauer owned the Puritan up until his death in 1961. In 1957, he allowed the American Museum of Natural History in New York to use the Puritan as a base of operations for an expedition. The expedition focused on the Gulf of California and logged more than 4,000 miles (6,400 km) while collecting specimens and studying the region. Members of the expedition included Oakes Plimpton, Richard Van Gelder, and Richard G. Zweifel and led to the discovery of Van Gelder's bat, among other finds. The Puritan-American Museum of Natural History Expedition to Western Mexico (1957) was the source of scientific publications into the mid-1960s.

In 1963, the boat was purchased at auction for $90,300 by Doyle D.W. Downey after sitting in mooring for two years after Bauer's death. Downey had previously purchased the Satartia (later known as Southwind) from Bauer, another schooner designed by John Alden. Downey used the Puritan in the charter trade in the Virgin Islands. In 1967, he ended up selling the Puritan to Mariano Prado-Sosa for $120,000. Mariano was a member of a wealthy Peruvian family that included Mariano Ignacio Prado, former president of Peru. Mariano refurbished the schooner and began using it as a charter between Miami, Florida, and the Virgin Islands. The boat was seized by the Mexican government on a charter to Acapulco. It was seized on behalf of the Peruvian government who blamed the Prado family for inequalities in Peru.

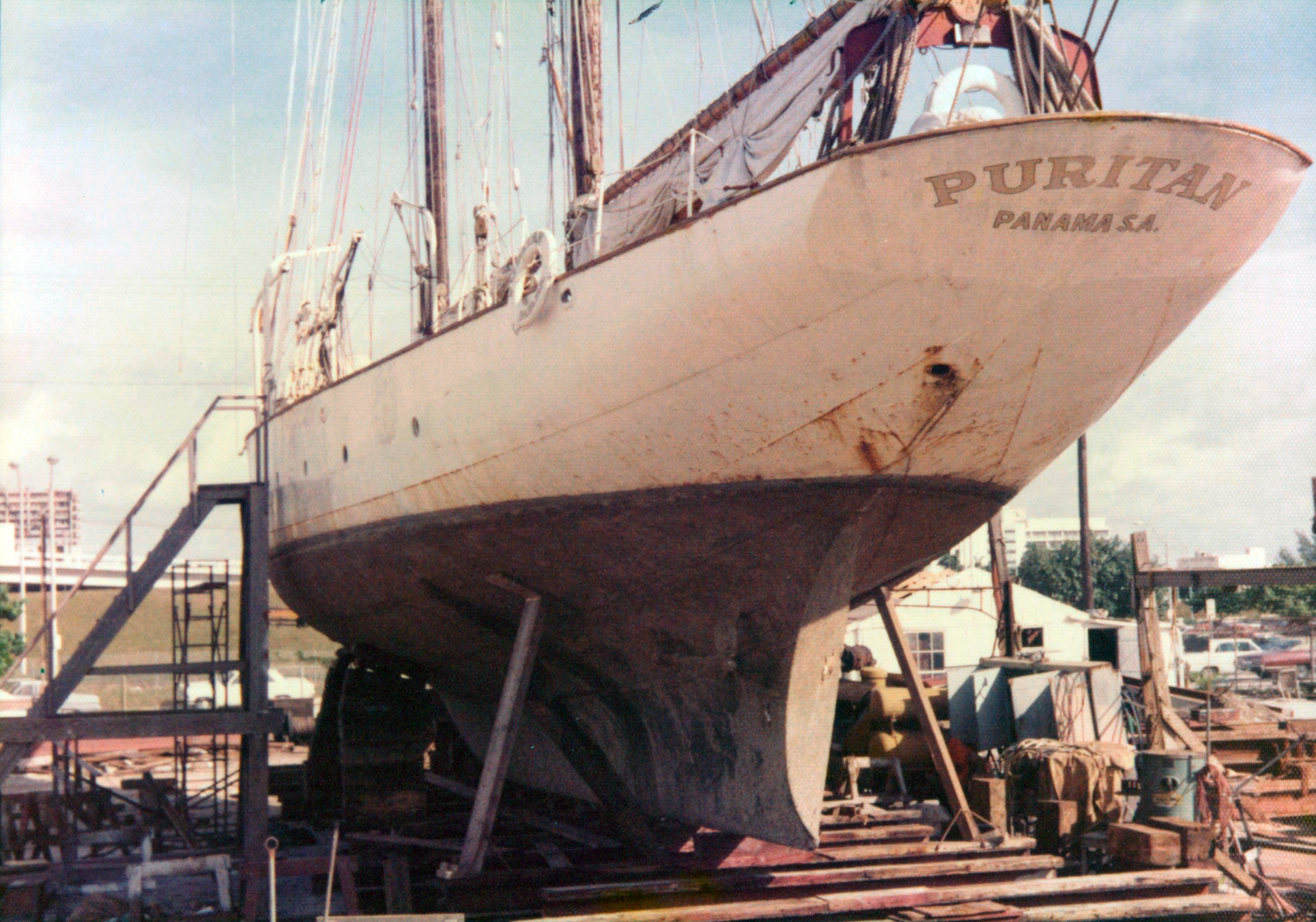
Puritan before restoration in 1972

In 1971, the Puritan was towed from Acapulco to Costa Rica and then brought back to Miami. At the time, the schooner was in poor shape in that nothing on the boat was operative except for the main engine. The toilets were plugged, batteries dead, and it could not travel more than 4 knots (7.4 km/h; 4.6 mph) due to the condition of the hull. It was purchased by Bill and Patsy Bolling in 1972, who spent seven months restoring the schooner. They returned the Puritan to charter in the Caribbean and also took part in schooner races, winning the Mystic Seaport Invitational Schooner Race in 1973.

The Puritan was sold to Oscar Schmidt in 1978. Puritan was taken to Camper & Nicholson's yard in Northam, Southampton for a refit. All of the internal joinery and wooden decking was removed. The hull was grit-blasted prior to being epoxy coated. Where possible, the original joinery was fitted back into the hull, but much new joinery was custom-made. A new teak deck was fitted. The work was completed in late 1978. Schmidt sailed the Puritan to Newport, Rhode Island, in 1980 for the America's Cup races. While there, he entered it into the Classic Yacht Regatta, where it won first in class. The schooner spent the next decade sailing the world, visiting places such as Bermuda and France.

In 1981, Puritan was the protagonist of an event that has gone down in the annals of ocean-faring history: during an Atlantic crossing toward Europe, she was dismasted in a storm, yet, thanks to the expert seamanship of her crew, she managed to reach her destination. The mast was subsequently rebuilt by the Cantiere Navale dell’Argentario in Porto Santo Stefano, Italy, a world-class center of excellence for the restoration of vintage vessels.

In 1989, it was sold again, this time to Arturo Ferruzzi who kept it in Antibes until it was sold to the current owner in 2015. It underwent a full refit and was put into service as a charter vessel with The Classic Yacht Experience.

== See also ==
- List of schooners
- List of United States Navy ships
