= Alden Triangle =

One-design sailboat from the 1920s

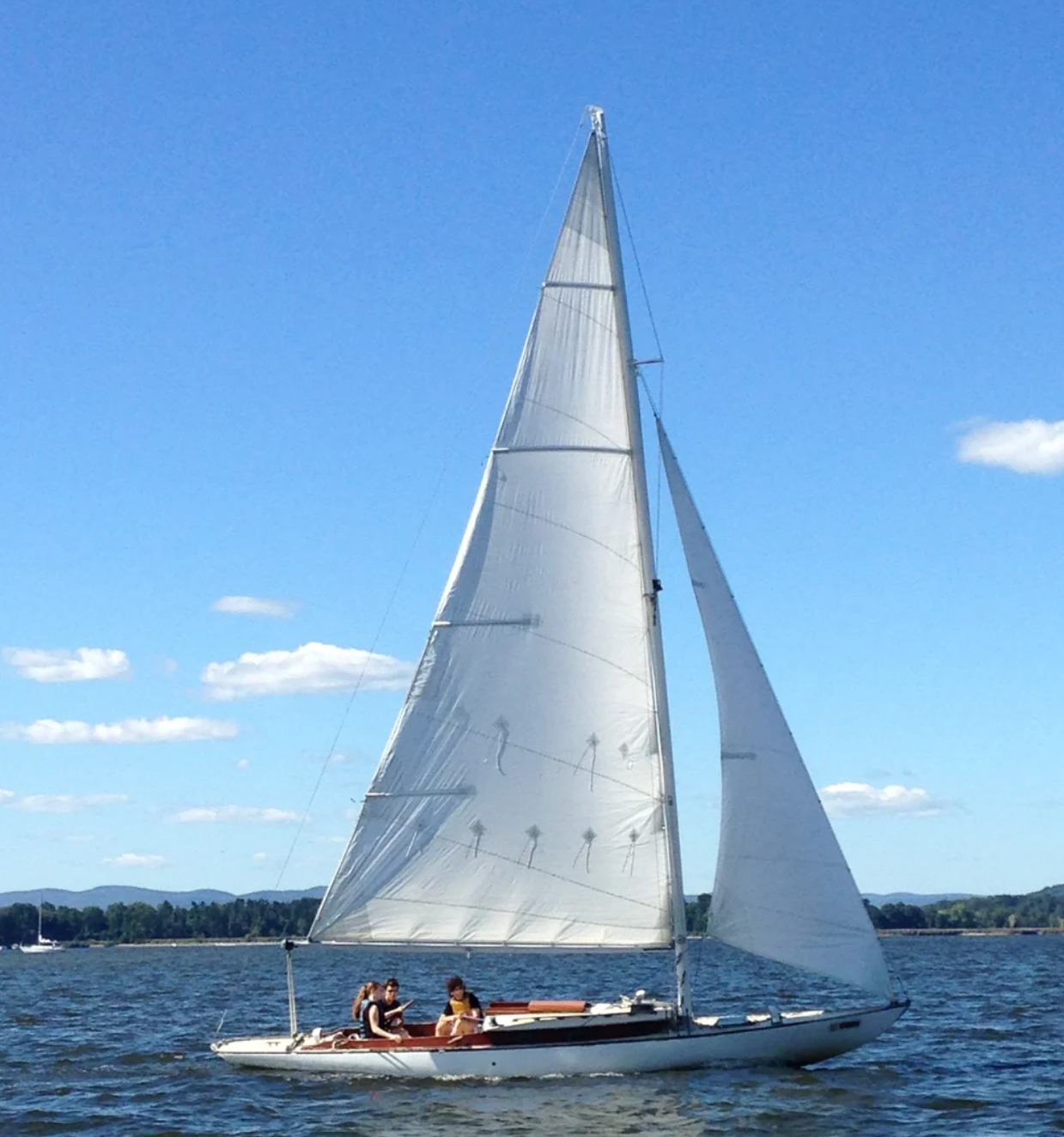
- An Alden Triangle under sail on the Hudson River, 2015

Development
- Designer: John Alden
- Year: 1926 - 1933
- Design: One-Design
- Builder: Graves Yacht Yard
- Name: Alden Triangle

Boat
- Displacement: 5,017 lb (2,276 kg)
- Draft: 4.75 ft (1.45 m)

Hull
- Construction: Cedar over White Oak
- LOA: 28.5 ft (8.7 m)
- LWL: 18.416 ft (5.613 m)
- Beam: 7.5 ft (2.3 m)

Sails
- Mainsail area: 335 ft^{2} (31.1 m^{2})
- Jib/genoa area: 72.5 ft^{2} (6.74 m^{2})

The Alden Triangle is a 28' 6" sailboat designed by John Alden and constructed at the Graves Yacht Yard in Marblehead, MA between 1926 and 1933. Its rig is a fractional Bermuda rig, with a large mainsail. The Triangle was designed for racing in Marblehead by three prominent yacht clubs in Marblehead: the Eastern Yacht Club, the Boston Yacht Club, and the Corinthian Yacht Club. These three yacht clubs are the namesake of the Triangle (each yacht club representing a "point" of the triangle). The Triangle class was also known as the "Jamestown" or "Marblehead" class, as well as the "Marblehead I8V2".

Approximately 60 were originally built, of which it is said that between 8 and 12 are remaining.

== History ==
In 1925, there were two broadly accepted handicap systems for yacht racing: the Universal Rule, developed by Nathanael Herreshoff in 1902, broadly accepted in the United States, and the International Rule, or Metre Rule, ratified in 1907. Both of these handicap systems created a series of construction classes, meaning that the boats are not identical but are all designed to meet a specific measurement formula. The Universal Rule created letter-designated classes, including the notorious J-Class, which was used for racing the America's Cup. The International Rule designated classes by a standard length, such as 6 metre, 8 metre, and 12 metre yachts, the latter of which were used in the America's Cup from 1958 to 1987. The Sonder class was also popular at the time in Marblehead and at surrounding yacht clubs

In the 1920s, at Marblehead, these construction class handicap system boats were popular, particularly the Q- and S-class. The Alden Triangle, by contrast, was developed for one-design racing, in which all boats in a given race are of the same design and must meet standards set forth by that design's class association. The Alden Triangle was first drawn in 1925, and a dozen were raced at the Eastern Yacht Club in the 1926 season, when its designer, John Alden, was the chairman of the Committee on Models.

== Racing ==
One-design racing of Triangles in Marblehead began in the 1926 season. In the following years, they were adopted by yacht clubs in Gloucester, MA, at the Eastern Point Yacht Club in 1928 and the Annisquam Yacht Club 1930. A fleet of 10 Triangles sailed in the 1927 season.. Photos by Massachusetts photographer Leslie Jones show Triangles fleet racing in 1930, 1931, 1932, and 1934. Triangles sailed in Marblehead Race Week in 1937, and fourteen remained at the Eastern Point Yacht Club in Gloucester after 1937. In 1939, the arrival of the International One Design marked a decisive end of an era for the Triangle and its Universal Rule siblings, the O-, S-, T-, and Q-classes, as well as the similar 8 meter class boats

== Design and construction ==
The Alden Triangle is a Bermuda rigged sloop, with a relatively large mainsail, fractional rigged jib, and a spinnaker. Different plans show an overall length of either 28' 6" long or 28" 5" long, with a waterline length of 18' 5". Most sources, including the original October 1925 lines drawing, list the overall length of the boat as 28' 6".

=== Hull construction ===
The hull of the Alden Triangle is constructed with 3/4" cedar planks over white oak frames. The deck is 3/4" canvas covered pine or cedar. The boat has a short full keel, with the white oak rudder attached to the trailing edge of the keel. The lead keel has a weight of approximately 2500 lbs. and is secured to the hull with 6 bronze keel bolts. The main bulkhead, cabin sides, and trim are mahogany.

=== Rig ===
The original rig design of the Triangle has a relatively large mainsail (335 square feet), with a 19' 2" foot which extends past the transom and prevents the presence of a backstay. The keel-stepped mast has a height of 37' 6" from the deck. The fractional jib (72.5 square feet) is attached to a boom and is self-tacking. The Triangle is rigged with a symmetrical spinnaker which is rigged with its head underneath where the inner forestay is attached to the mast, so gybing the spinnaker requires passing the sail under the forestay. The original rig diagram has the mast supported by two shrouds on each side and two forestays.

=== 1958 Rig revision ===
An updated rig diagram was released in 1958 which shortened the boom, added a backstay, and changed the double forestay design to a single forestay, mounted higher than in the original design. This reduced the mainsail area from 335 square feet to 271 square feet, and increased the jib area from 72.5 square feet to 96 square feet.

== Contemporary information ==
The Alden design firm closed in 2008, after which all the company's catalog of plans was donated to the Hart Nautical Collection within the MIT Museum. Plans are available for viewing, and scans can be purchased from the MIT Museum and used with permission. The Hart Nautical Collection maintains a database of Alden designs, although only 20 Triangles are documented. The Triangle is listed as design #278 in this database and on the drawings.
