= QLF =

QLF may refer to:

- Quebec-Labrador Foundation
- Quebec Liberation Front
- Queens Liberation Front
- Query level feature
