= Kevin Sharpe =

Kevin Sharpe may refer to:

- Kevin Sharpe (historian) (1949–2011), historian
- Kevin J. Sharpe (1950–2008), mathematician and theologian

== See also ==
- Kevin Sharp (disambiguation)
