= Gitana (yacht) =

1936 yacht

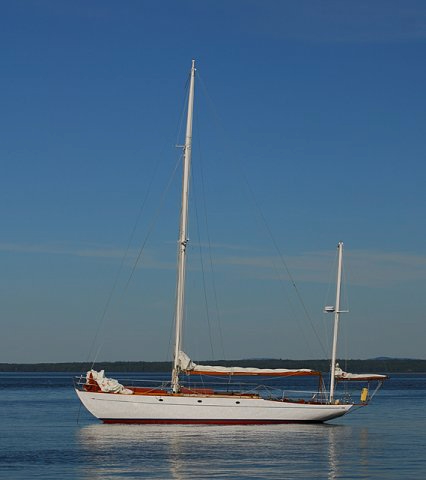
- Gitana at anchor in Maine
- Designer(s): John Alden
- Builder: Nunes Bros Shipbuilders
- Launched: 1936

Specifications
- Type: Yawl
- Displacement: 26,000 pounds (12,000 kg)
- Length: 39 feet 9 inches (12.12 m) (LOD), 30 feet 3 inches (9.22 m) (LWL)
- Beam: 10 feet 4 inches (3.15 m)
- Draft: 6 feet (1.8 m)
- Mast height: 56 feet (17 m)
- Sail area: 1,700 square feet (160 m^{2})
- Crew: 6

- Sailing Vessel Gitana
- U.S. National Register of Historic Places
- Location: New Rochelle, New York
- Coordinates: 40°53′19″N 73°47′06″W
- NRHP reference No.: 100011073
- Added to NRHP: November 27, 2024

Gitana is a classic yacht built in 1936 after plans of American Naval Architect John Alden.

== Design and build ==
Gitana was built by Nunes Bros Shipbuilders in Sausalito, California for Richard Danforth, an American civil engineer and inventor of a popular, patented lightweight anchor.

Originally drawn as a Bermuda rigged sloop, John Alden's design number 630 represents the architects modern type, in contrast to his successful series of gaff-rigged schooners.

With a displacement of 26000lbs at a hull length of 40 and beam of 10 feet, Gitana was, at the time, a relatively moderate displacement vessel. Hull construction is 5/4 inch Mahogany carvel planking over white oak centerline and steam-bent frames. All fixed ballast is external.

== History ==
After campaigning Gitana in San Francisco and West Coast races including the 1947 transpacific race, Danforth relocated the boat to the Maine coast where she was converted for cruising with the addition of a mizzen mast and sail. In 1961, the boat was acquired by Coast Guard Captain Ernest Burt Jr of Annapolis. In 2014, the ship was acquired and is now privately owned and berthed in New Rochelle, New York. It was listed on the National Register of Historic Places in 2024.

An annual boat race in Maine is named after Gitana.

== Measurements ==
- LOD 39' 9"
- Beam 10' 4"
- LWL 30' 3"
- Draft 6'
