= Nauticat Yachts =

Yacht manufacturer

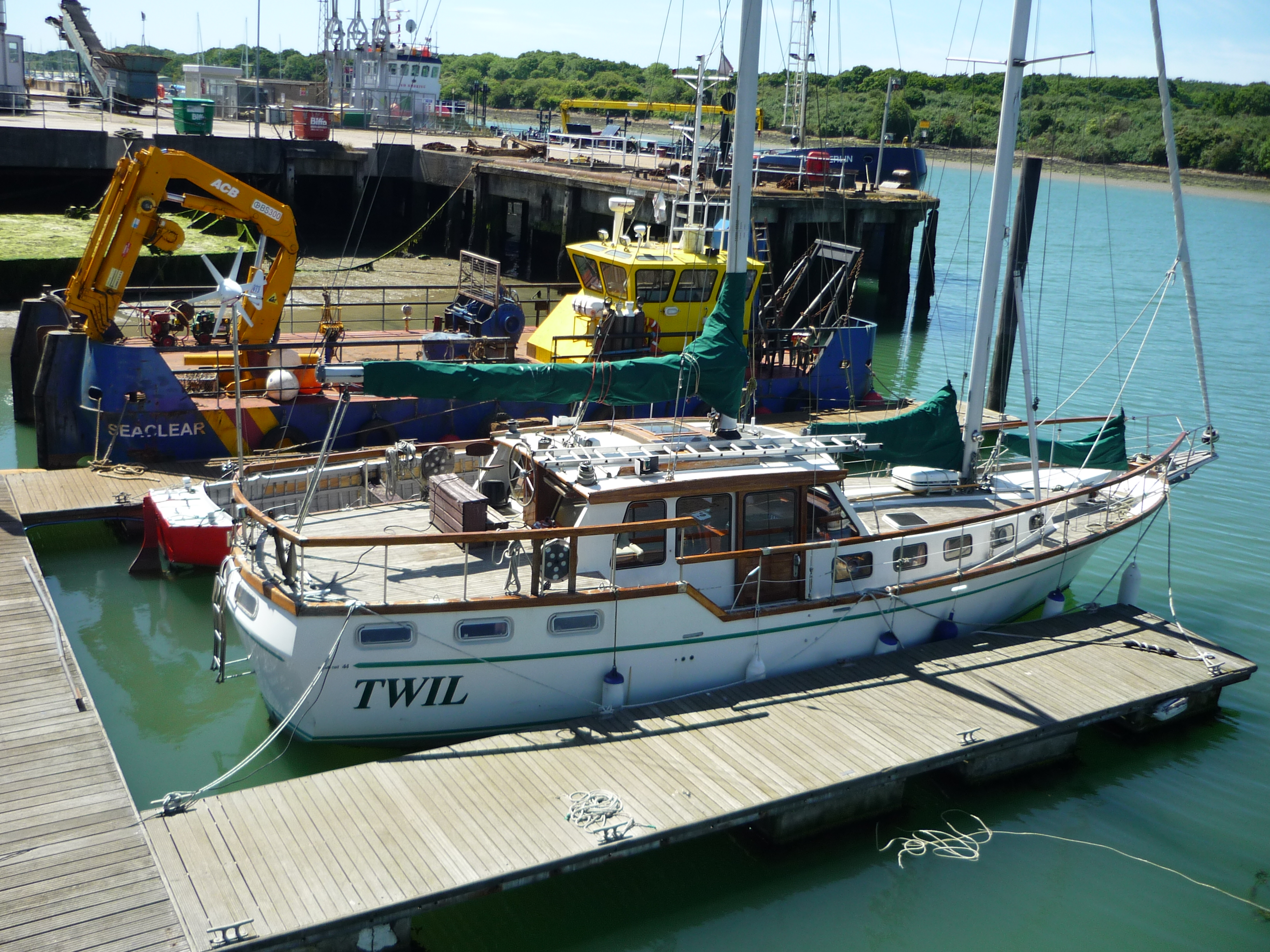
Nauticat 44

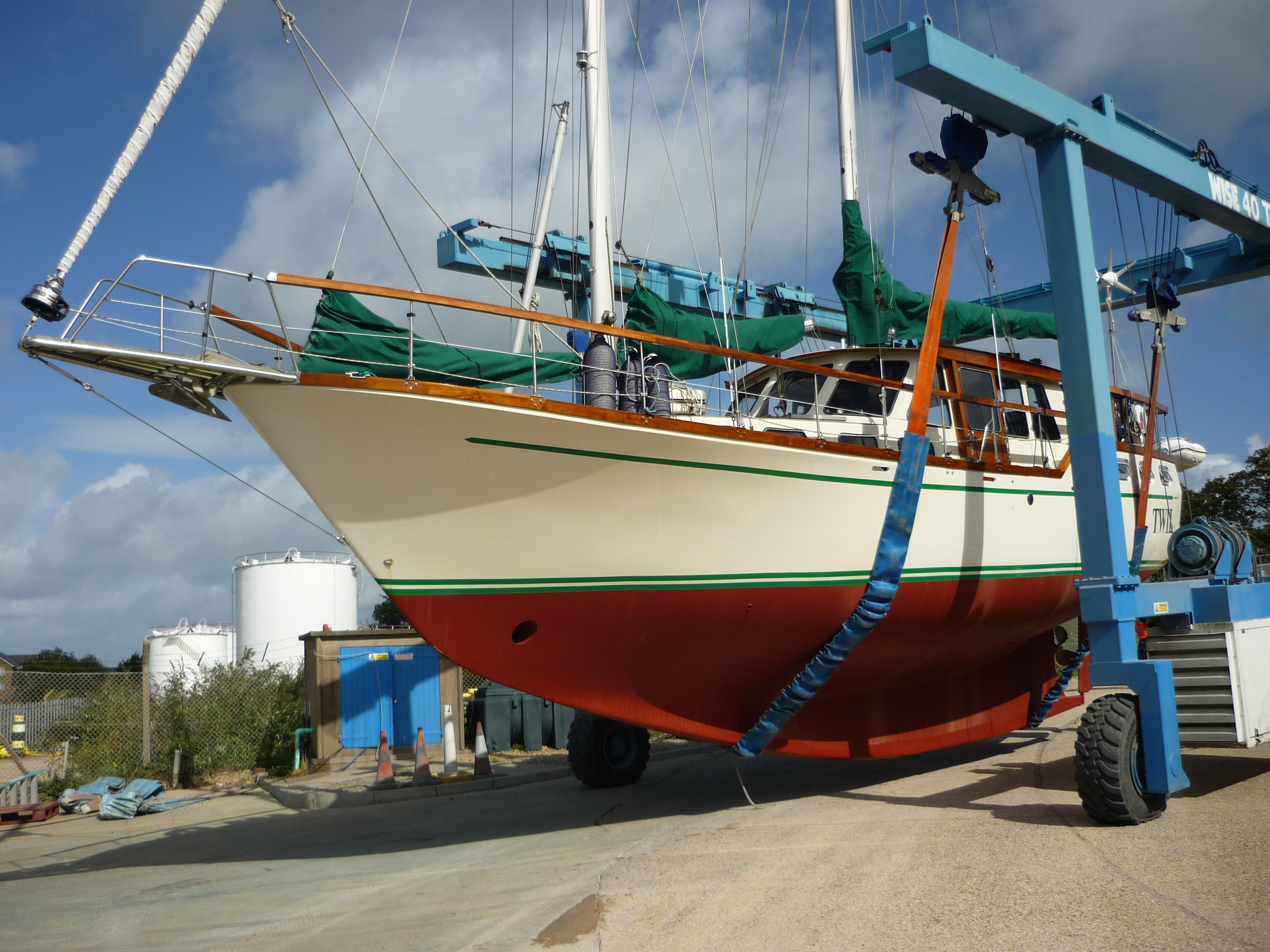
Nauticat 44 showing hull design

Nauticat Yachts SIA (previously Nauticat Yachts OY) is a manufacturer of yachts. They make traditional ketch rigged motorsailers and the pilothouse sailing yachts. They were based in Finland, and was originally known as Siltala Yachts, but the name was changed in 2005 to Nauticat which was the name of their main yacht range. They have so far manufactured over 2500 yachts ranging in size from 33 to 51 feet.

The Nauticat 44 is an ocean-going motorsailer with a cutter rig, ketch or optional schooner rig and pilothouse. The Nauticat 44 has a long keel and keel-mounted rudder, whereas other boats in the range have fin keels. The Nauticat 44 design has been refined as the Nauticat 441.

Nauticat Yachts Oy declared bankruptcy on 16 May 2018 and the company assets were offered for sale.

In 2022, a group of Latvian entrepreneurs engaged in the revival of production. They merged under the new name NAUTICAT YACHTS SIA. The company’s CEO is an experienced yachtsman, businessman and owner of the Sunlight Sailing yacht school, Dmitry Muratov.

The main production will be based in Latvia.

== See also ==
- List of sailboat designers and manufacturers
