= Finger fluting =

Lines made by fingers in prehistoric art

Flutings at the start of the 150-square-metre (1,600 sq ft) Desbordes Panel, Chamber A1, Rouffignac Cave, France.

In prehistoric art, finger flutings are lines that fingers leave on a soft surface. Considered a form of cave painting, they occur in caves throughout southern Australia, New Guinea, and southwestern Europe, and were presumably made over a considerable time span including some or all of the Upper Paleolithic. Most are not obvious figures or symbols but, rather, appear to many observers as enigmatic lines. They are also called tracés digitaux or finger tracings and (though these terms are also in part interpretative) meanders, macaroni, and serpentines. The term finger fluting was coined by Robert G. Bednarik.

Generally they are made in a substance called moonmilk. Sometimes they are made through a thin clay film into moonmilk underneath or perhaps just into clay.

As Henri Breuil has published, finger flutings have been recognized since the early days of the 20th century in Europe as Paleolithic. Their recognition as having a similar antiquity outside of Europe lay chiefly in the hands of Sandor (Alexander) Gallus and then in Koonalda Cave in Australia. Many other sites both in Europe and Australia have been found, some of the more famous being Gargas and Baume Latronne caves in France and the cave of Altamira in Spain.

== Study methods ==
Bednarik continues to publish sites that contain flutings, but current forward research into finger flutings is mainly being carried out by Kevin J. Sharpe and Leslie Van Gelder. They have developed the following methods for this purpose. Their cornerstones include multiple examinations of the flutings under investigation, experimentation, and the initial and primarily setting aside of questions of meaning (as such assumptions can determine what investigators then see in the flutings). The physical data in the flutings themselves comprise what they seek: how the fluters constructed their flutings, how the flutings functioned with respect to one other and, if possible, how the flutings functioned for the fluters. Sharpe and Van Gelder use a specific terminology for their studies and call upon three analyses.

=== Terminology ===
A fluter makes a fluting by sweeping their fingers across a soft surface; a unit comprises flutings drawn with one sweep of one hand or finger; the profile of a unit or a fluter comprises the silhouette of the finger tops left in the medium from the fluting; a cluster comprises an isolatable group of units that exhibit a unity, for instance because they overlay each other; and a panel comprises a collection of clusters that appears geographically or otherwise distant from other clusters or on a surface of reasonably uniform orientation.

=== Internal analysis ===
In terms of the field methodology, having become familiar with a cluster, an Internal Analysis of it is carried out, specially noting the directions of the flutings and their overlays. This provides the differentiation of clusters and units, and the temporal sequence of the flutings. The analysis relates to Alexander Marshack's question, asked especially for engraved line markings: What do the order, direction of and (especially for engravings) the tools for creation of the lines tell about the mind of the artifact creator when creating? Though Marshack pioneered this technique, it has been modified in its application by others such as Bednarik, Francesco d'Errico, and Michel Lorblanchet. It forms the backbone of research into line markings such as flutings.

=== Forensic analysis ===
One of their additions to this methodological base, Sharpe and Van Gelder call a 'Forensic Analysis.' In this, they record where possible whether the left or right hand made the unit under examination, as indicated by the presence of marks that the first or fifth finger – written F1 or F5 – would make. These appear distinctively different from one another and from the marks of the other fingers. They measure the width of the F2-F4 set of marks at their narrowest, calling this the 3-fingered width of the unit. The width data for the three fingers suggest the age category of the fluter, namely whether a young child or older. A Forensic Analysis also examines the profile of a 4- or 5-fingered unit, for frequently units start with the tops of fingers and the investigator needs at least four fingers to tell whether the hand is left or right. Then the investigator records the relative height of F2 to F4 against F3. This would suggest the gender of the fluter painter. Further, consistency of widths and profiles, and perhaps some other features among units suggest the same person painted them with the finger-fluting technique.

== Results of studies ==
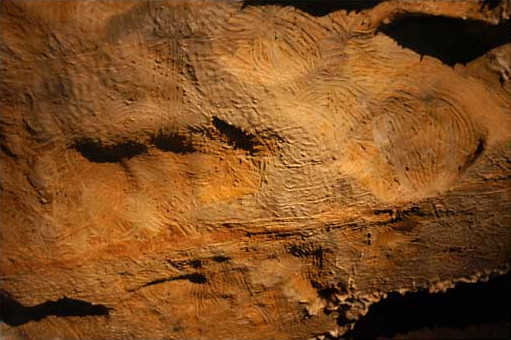
Flutings on the ceiling of the Zone of Crevices, Gargas Cave, France. Part of a 400-square-metre (4,300 sq ft) panel.

Sharpe and Van Gelder's work has focused on flutings found in the French caves of Rouffignac, in the Dordogne, and Gargas in the Hautes Pyrenees. Using the above methods, they have shown:

- the involvement of young children aged 2–5 in Paleolithic art and who may have been held up to do this;
- females and males created the art* a young girl created a commonly accepted symbol;
- the inadequacy of Claude Barrière and Breuil's identification of fluted animals in Gargas Cave;
- two panels were efficient communication and
- indications as to the fluter's identity (in particular, distinguishing the flutings made by an individual fluter).

== Interpretations ==
The lack of thorough studies, or even methods for doing them, means speculation as to the meaning of flutings runs unchecked, even by the most well-known experts on prehistoric art. They are seen, for example, as representing such things as the first scribbles by humans, though intuitive and random but serpentines (Breuil); water related (Marshack); entopic shapes or phosphenes (Bednarik); huts, comets, or rivers, or linear-phallic and male symbols in the statistical placement of signs within a cave (Leroi-Gourhan); snakes (and thereby associated with death) (Barrière); psycho-neurological archetypes (Gallus); hunting marks (Barrière); shamanic ritual (Lewis-Williams). The corpus of Paleolithic flutings is too complex to fit into a single meaning paradigm. Too much in prehistoric art does not conform to what modern people might see as figures and symbols, flutings offering an example. Investigators bring to their study and tie their methods to preconceived notions as to what is meaningful, what constitutes a pattern, and what they think is the origin of fluting making.

That need not stop people responsibly offering meaning or intentionality hypotheses, Sharpe and Van Gelder state. But all such hypotheses must subject themselves to the data uncovered by investigations using sound methods.

Tracings of hands and finger flutings often show the dimensions of children.

== Selected bibliography ==
- Bednarik, Robert G. Parietal Finger Markings in Europe and Australia. Rock Art Research 3:1 (May 1986): 30–61.
- Breuil, Henri. Four Hundred Centuries of Cave Art. Montignac, France: Centre d'Études et Documentations Prehistoriques, 1952.
- Marshack, Alexander. The Meander as a System: The Analysis and Recognition of Iconographic Units in Upper Paleolithic Compositions. In Form in Indigenous Art: Schematization in the Art of Aboriginal Australia and Prehistoric Europe, Prehistory and Material Culture Series, no. 13, ed. Peter J. Ucko (Canberra: Australian Institute of Aboriginal Studies, 1977), pp. 286–317.
- Sharpe, Kevin and Leslie Van Gelder. The Study of Finger Flutings. Cambridge Archaeological Journal 16:3 (October 2006), pp. 281–295.
- Finger Flutings in Chamber A1 of Rouffignac Cave, France. Rock Art Research 23:2 (November 2006), pp. 179–198.
- Evidence for Cave Marking by Paleolithic Children. Antiquity 80:310 (December 2006), pp. 937–947.
