= Clara Brown (sloop) =

Historic racing boat in New York, US

- U.S. National Register of Historic Places
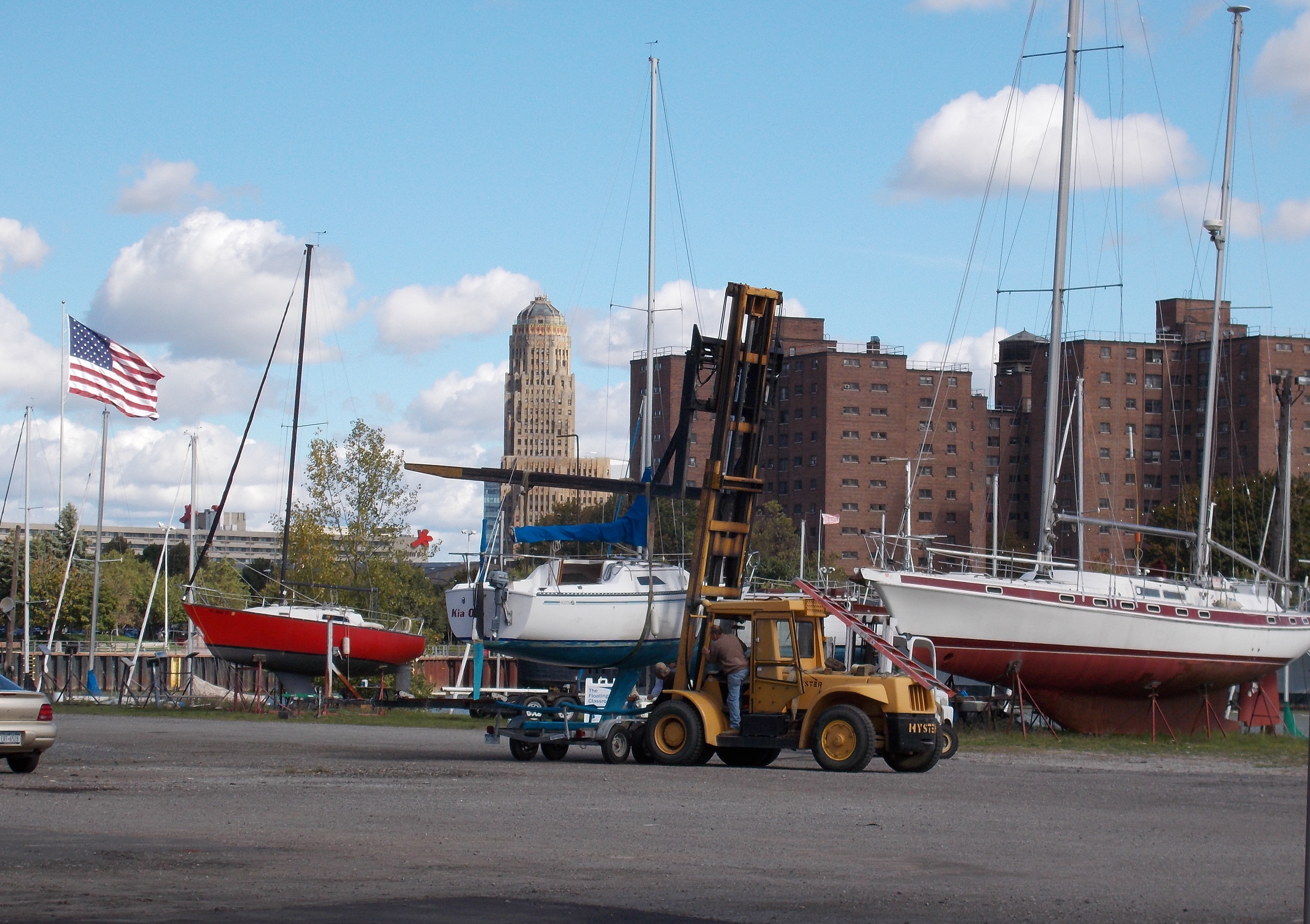
- First Buffalo River Marina location of the Clara Brown, September 2012

- Location within New York Location within the United States
- Location: First Buffalo River Marina, 32 Fuhrman Blvd., Buffalo, New York
- Coordinates: 42°52′26″N 78°52′52″W
- Area: Less than one acre
- Built: 1952
- Built by: Goudy and Stephens Shipbuilding Company
- Architect: Alden, John G.
- Architectural style: Sloop
- NRHP reference No.: 13000098
- Added to NRHP: March 20, 2013

Clara Brown, also known as John G. Alden Design No. 872, is a historic racing sloop located at Buffalo in Erie County, New York. It was designed by John G. Alden and built by Goudy & Stevens Shipyard in Boothbay, Maine. It was designed in 1950 and launched in 1952. She measures 34 feet 4 inches (10.46 m) in length, 7 feet (2.1 m) in beam, and with her fixed keel has a draft of 4 feet 11 inches (1.50 m). She was moved to Buffalo in the mid-1980s after sailing on Lake Champlain.

It was listed on the National Register of Historic Places in 2013.
