= Nauticat 44 =

Sailboat class

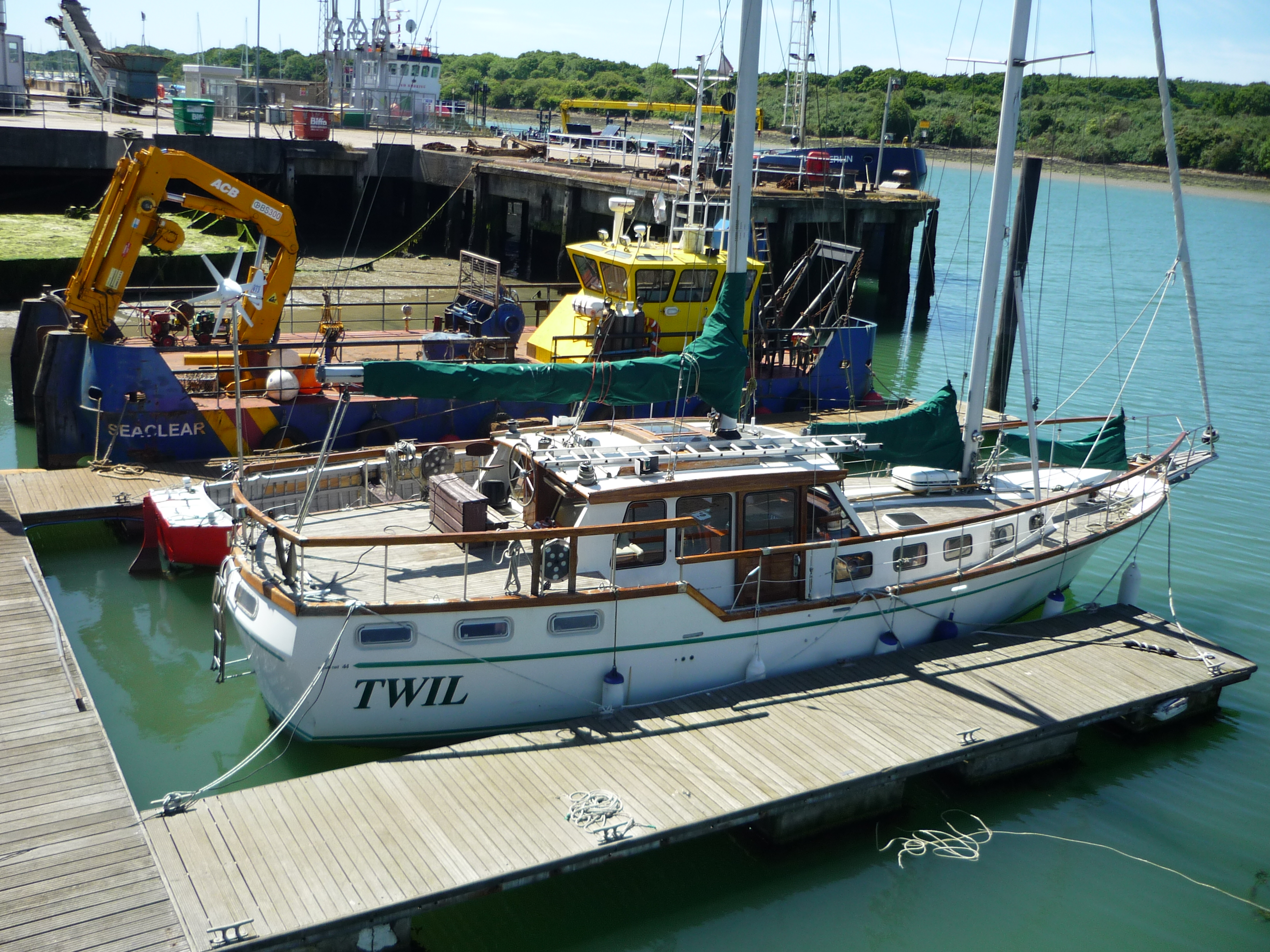
- Nauticat 44 schooner

Development
- Designer: Kaj Gustafsson
- Location: Finland
- Year: 1974
- Builder: Siltala Yachts/Nauticat Yachts Oy
- Role: Motorsailer
- Name: Nauticat 44

Boat
- Displacement: 32,000 lb (14,515 kg)
- Draft: 5.92 ft (1.80 m)

Hull
- Type: Monohull
- Construction: Fibreglass
- LOA: 43.67 ft (13.31 m)
- LWL: 37.75 ft (11.51 m)
- Beam: 12.17 ft (3.71 m)
- Engine: Ford Motors 120 hp (89 kW) diesel engine

Hull appendages
- Keel: long keel
- Rudder: keel-mounted rudder

Rig
- Rig type: Bermuda rig

Sails
- Sailplan: Ketch
- Total sail area: 1,227.00 sq ft (113.992 m^{2})

The Nauticat 44 is a Finnish motorsailer sailboat that was designed by Kaj Gustafsson as a cruiser and first built in 1974.

== Production ==
The design was built by Siltala Yachts in Finland, which later changed its name to Nauticat Yachts Oy. Production was started in 1974, but the design is now out of production. The company was declared bankrupt on 16 May 2018.

== Design ==
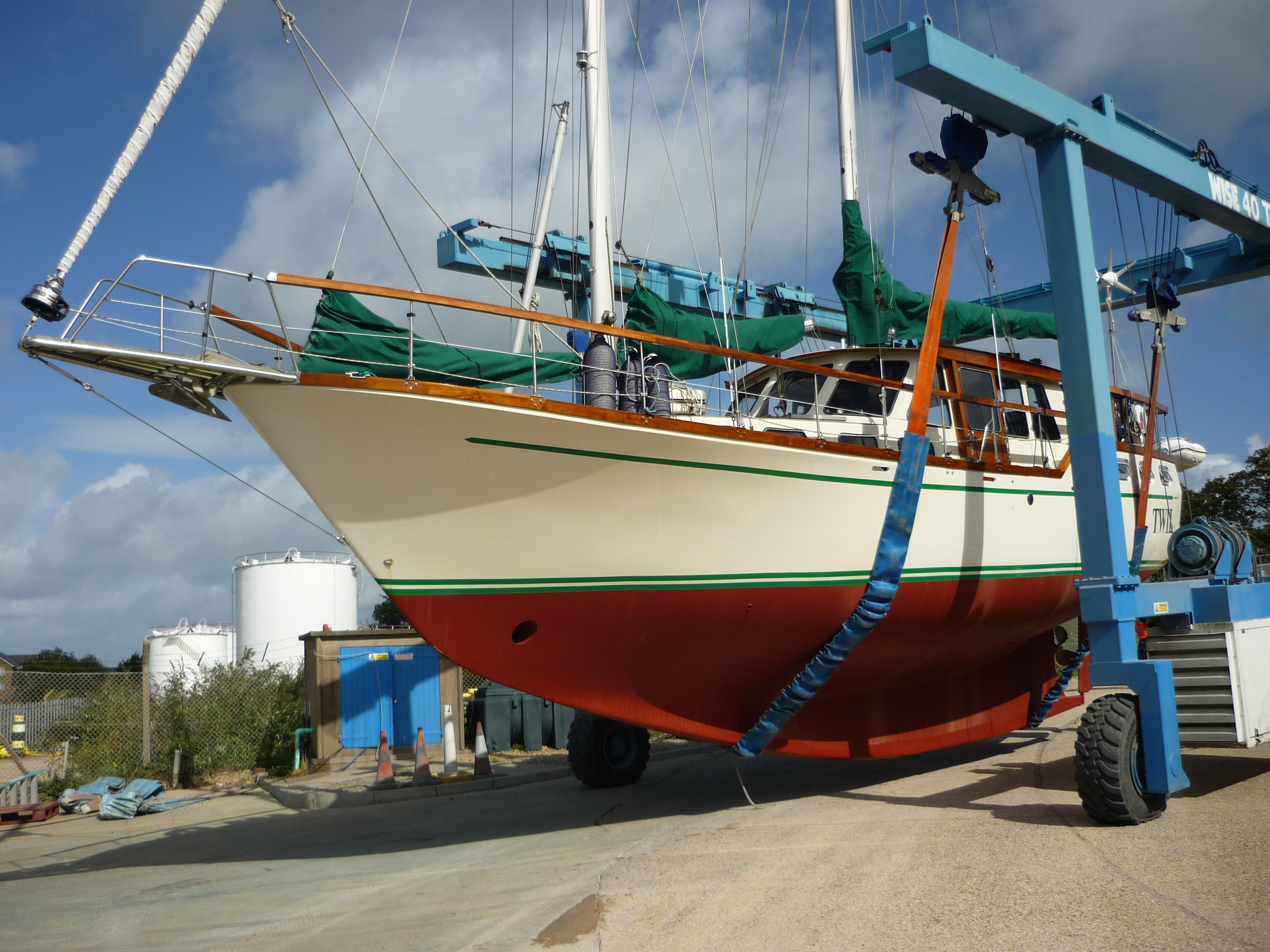
Nauticat 44 schooner on a boat lift, showing the hull and keel shape

The Nauticat 44 is a recreational keelboat, built predominantly of fiberglass, with teak wood decks and trim. It has a ketch, schooner or optional cutter rig, with aluminum spars. The schooner rig may include a jib and staysails on both masts.

The design features a raked stem, a nearly plumb transom, a keel-mounted rudder controlled by wheels in the cockpit and the wheelhouse. It has a fixed long keel and displaces 32,000 lb (14,515 kg).

The boat has a draft of 5.92 ft (1.80 m) with the standard keel.

The boat is fitted with a British Ford Motor Company diesel engine of 120 hp (89 kW). The fuel tank holds 285 U.S. gallons (1,080 L; 237 imp gal) and the fresh water tank has a capacity of 200 U.S. gallons (760 L; 170 imp gal).

The design has sleeping accommodation for six to seven people, with a double "V"-berth in the bow cabin, a U-shaped settee with a drop-down table and a straight settee in the main cabin, plus an "L" settee in the wheelhouse at the navigation station and an aft cabin with a double berth. The galley is located forward on the port side just aft of the bow cabin. The galley is U-shaped and is equipped with a two-burner stove, refrigerator and a double sink. There are two heads, one just aft of the bow cabin on the starboard side and one on the port side in the aft cabin.

Ventilation is provided by opening ports, a sliding hatch and two main cabin sliding doors that open to the deck. The aft cabin features stern ports.

For sailing the design is equipped with halyard winches on each mast, plus four sheet winches. There is a bow-mounted anchor roller provided.

== Operational history ==
In a 1994 review Richard Sherwood wrote, "this big motor sailer is shown primarily because of its schooner rig, It is also included because of the wheelhouse and the cabin plan peculiar to a motor sailer. The large quantities of water and fuel give a cruising range under power of 900 nautical miles."

== See also ==
- List of sailing boat types

Similar sailboats

- Alden 44
- Worldcruiser 44
