= Kevin Sharp (disambiguation) =

Kevin Sharp (1970–2014) was an American country music singer.

Kevin Sharp may also refer to:

- Kevin Sharp (cricketer) (born 1959), English cricketer
- Kevin Sharp (footballer) (born 1974), Canadian-born English footballer
- Kevin Sharp, heavy metal/grindcore singer for Venomous Concept and Brutal Truth
- Kevin H. Sharp (born 1963), federal judge of the United States District Court for the Middle District of Tennessee

== See also ==
- Kevin Sharpe (disambiguation)
