= Tāhuna Glenorchy Dark Sky Sanctuary =

Dark sky preserve in New Zealand

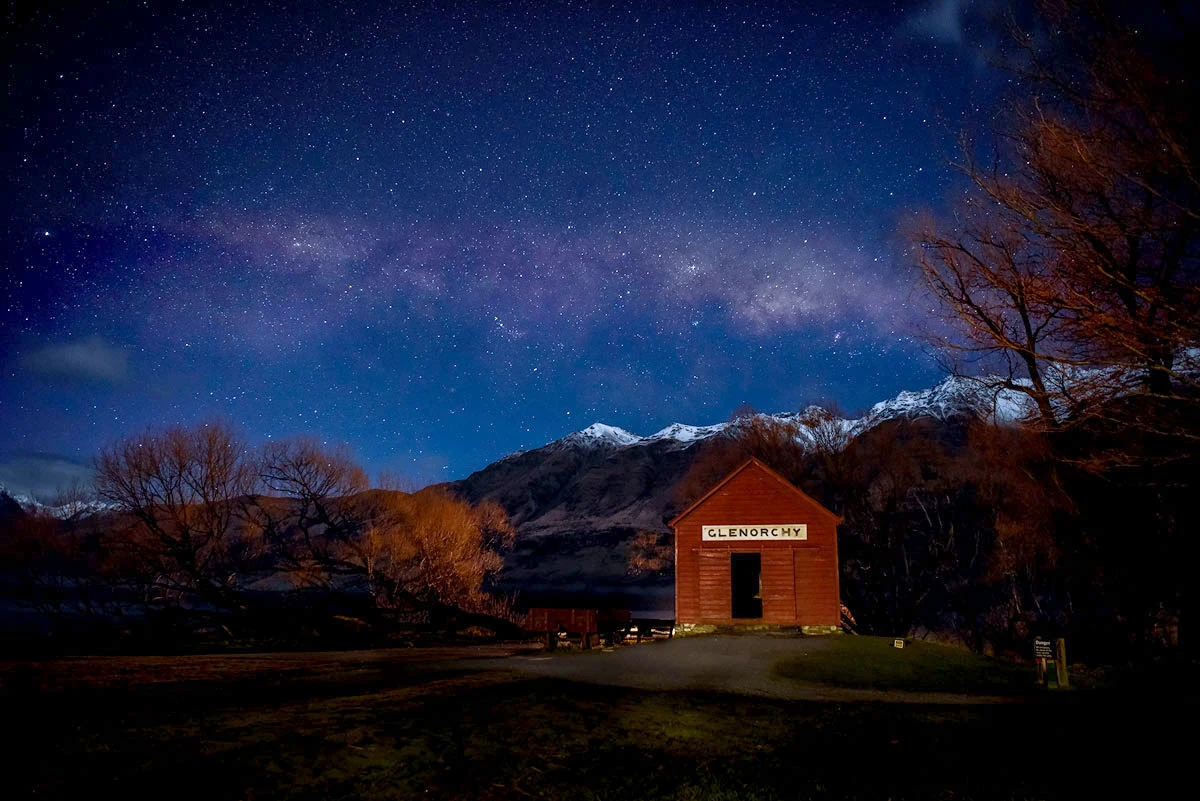
- The Milky Way over the Glenorchy wharf shed
- Interactive map of Tāhuna Glenorchy Dark Sky Sanctuary
- Location: Queenstown-Lakes District, New Zealand
- Nearest town: Queenstown
- Coordinates: 44°39′18″S 168°18′54″E
- Area: 2,150 km^{2} (830 sq mi)
- Designated: 2025
- Governing body: Glenorchy Heritage and Museum Group
- Website: glenorchydarkskies.org.nz

The Tāhuna Glenorchy Dark Sky Sanctuary is a dark-sky preserve located in the Queenstown-Lakes District in the South Island of New Zealand. It covers an area of 2,150 km^{2} (830 sq mi) at the head of Lake Wakatipu, and includes a large portion of the Mount Aspiring National Park. The border of the sanctuary begins at Bennett's Bluff, on the road between Queenstown and Glenorchy, and extends to the northern boundary of Mt Aspiring National Park. Around 75% of the sanctuary lies within Te Wāhipounamu World Heritage area. The Dark Sky Sanctuary area includes the Greenstone-Caples, Routeburn and Rees-Dart walking tracks.

DarkSky International announced the certification of Tāhuna Glenorchy as a Dark Sky Sanctuary on 3 February 2025. At the time of the announcement, it was only the 23rd location world-wide to receive this recognition. The area certified as a Dark Sky Sanctuary excludes the settlements of Glenorchy and Kinloch. As of August 2025 there is a plan to obtain certification of the townships as a Dark Sky Community.

A dark sky sanctuary is a type of dark sky place defined by DarkSky International as:

A public or private land that has an exceptional or distinguished quality of starry nights and a nocturnal environment that is protected for its scientific, natural, or educational value, its cultural heritage, and/or public enjoyment.

The founders of the Tāhuna Glenorchy Dark Sky Sanctuary are a team within the Glenorchy Heritage and Museum Group, led by chairperson and local resident Leslie Van Gelder. The team spent five years in preparation, leading up to the certification. The application for certification reports that night sky luminance in the sanctuary area is 21.61 mag/arcsec^{2} (corresponding to Bortle scale 2, and representing a truly dark sky). There are no visible light domes in any direction, because the light dome from Queenstown is shielded by the height of the mountains between the town and the area of the sanctuary. The Tāhuna Glenorchy Dark Sky Sanctuary is in an astronomical "sweet spot" at 45 degrees south where the Aurora Australis and the core of the Milky Way can both be seen. There are only 10,000 people living in that band around the world.

In preparing the application for designation, the Tāhuna Glenorchy Dark Sky Group made measurements of the night sky brightness, and studied nocturnal species in the area. Their application was supported by the Department of Conservation, with hut wardens measuring night sky luminance at remote hut sites. Representatives of the Kāi Tahu iwi helped the group improve their understanding of the importance of the stars to Māori. The group has also organised educational activities and annual celebrations of Matariki, the Māori New Year festival that marks the first rising of the Pleiades star cluster in late June or early July. The dual name of the sanctuary, Tāhuna Glenorchy, acknowledges the Māori word tāhuna, meaning sandy shore, beach or seaside, that is also the name for the land where Queenstown is now located.

Prior to the announcement of the designation by DarkSky International, an Otago based astronomical organisation, Winterstellar, introduced their own system of recognition of dark sky places and the communities that work to protect them. In December 2024, they made their inaugural award to Tāhuna Glenorchy.

== See also ==
- Dark sky movement in New Zealand
- Astrotourism
- DarkSky International
