= Mayan (schooner) =

1947 wooden schooner

Development
- Designer: John G. Alden
- Year: 1947
- Design: No. 356-B
- Builder: P.R. Allen
- Name: Mayan

Boat
- Crew: 3 minimum
- Displacement: 61,600 lb (27,900 kg)
- Draft: 4.5 ft (1.4 m)
- Air draft: 62 ft (19 m)

Hull
- Construction: wood
- LOA: 74 ft (23 m)
- LWL: 45.5 ft (13.9 m)
- Beam: 16.5 ft (5.0 m)

Hull appendages
- Keel: lifting centerboard
- Ballast: 9,000 lb (4,100 kg)

Rig
- Rig type: transitional schooner

Mayan is a 74-foot wooden schooner designed by John G. Alden and built in Belize in 1947. She is Alden Design No. 356-B - a Centerboard Schooner constructed of Honduran mahogany. Her name was taken from her country of origin of Belize where the Maya civilization developed. Her current home port is San Francisco Bay where she serves as the flagship of the St. Francis Yacht Club.

== Characteristics ==
Mayan is rigged as a transitional schooner with a gaff foresail and a Marconi mainsail. She has an overall length of 73 feet and a beam of 16.5 feet. She is 59.5 feet on deck and 62 feet to the main masthead with the intent to be operated on the Intracoastal Waterway. Her draft ranges from a maximum of 10 feet to a minimum of 4.5 feet through the use of a lifting centerboard. She has a ballast of 10,000 pounds and a displacement of 68,000 pounds. She was originally built White Oak for the frames, Honduran Somosa for the heavy timbers, Honduran mahogany for the planking (fastened with iron nails) and yellow pine for ceiling carvel planking Teak decking atop White oak deck frames. She was significantly rebuilt in 2005 with purple heart frames and bronze fastened double-planked with sepele and cedar set in epoxy.

Mayan accommodates eight guests and requires a crew of three to sail.

== History ==
Mayan was designed by John Alden's office in 1946 for Paul and Charles Allen, Paul served as a WWII Navy captain, and was a revision on their Design No. 356 from 1928. C. Allen's son, Paul Allen led the construction team at Tewes Dockyard near Belize City, in the former British Honduras. Mayan was sailed to New York City after launching. She was sold in 1948 and served in the charter trade under a series of owners through the 1950s and 1960s.

In 1969, musician David Crosby found Mayan in Port Everglades in Fort Lauderdale and purchased her for $22,500 borrowed from fellow musician Peter Tork. He sailed her from Florida through the Caribbean and the Panama Canal to a new home port in Sausalito, California. In 1970, Crosby began living on Mayan full-time and wrote songs such as "Wooden Ships", "Carry Me", and "Lee Shore" while aboard. Crosby eventually moved Mayan to Santa Barbara, California. He owned her for 46 years.

In 2005, Mayan was extensively rebuilt by master shipwright Wayne Ettel. At that time her Mercedes Benz engine was entirely rebuilt, much of her rigging replaced, and various systems improved or replaced.

In 2014, Stacey & Beau Vrolyk purchased Mayan from Crosby and moved her to Santa Cruz, California which remains her home port. From 2014 to 2018 during the off-season, the Vrolyk's returned Mayan to Wayne Ettel's boatyard and had her cockpit replaced, new fuel tanks and plumbing made, a holding tank added, a new head and shower built, her rail caps replaced, her Sampson post and many more of her frames replaced, and removed the white paint and varnished the cabin sides and rails. In 2022, master rigger Matthew Coale of Santa Cruz converted her from a staysail schooner back into her original design as a transitional schooner and outfitted her for classics racing.
