= Lawrence Van Gelder =

American journalist (1933–2016)

- Born: Lawrence Ralph Van Gelder; February 17, 1933; New York City, New York, U.S.
- Died: March 11, 2016 (aged 83); New York City, New York, U.S.
- Education: Columbia University
- Occupations: Editor, reporter, instructor in journalism
- Notable credits: The New York Times; New York World-Telegram and Sun; New York Daily Mirror; New York Daily News
- Relatives: Richard Van Gelder (brother); Gordon Van Gelder (nephew); Leslie Van Gelder (niece); Russell Van Gelder (nephew)

Lawrence Ralph Van Gelder (February 17, 1933 – March 11, 2016) was an American journalist and instructor in journalism who worked at several different New York City-based newspapers in his long career. Until 2010, he was a senior editor of the Arts and Leisure weekly section of The New York Times, as well as a film critic. Among the newspapers for which Van Gelder worked were the New York Daily Mirror, the New York Daily News, the New York World-Telegram and Sun and the World-Journal-Tribune.

Biologist Richard Van Gelder was his brother and Gordon Van Gelder, the editor and publisher of The Magazine of Fantasy & Science Fiction, a nephew. Van Gelder graduated from Columbia University in 1953 (Columbia College (New York) and Columbia Law School). He began working at the Times in May 1967.

Lawrence Van Gelder died of leiomyosarcoma on March 11, 2016, aged 83.
