= Wendameen (yacht) =

- Wendameen (Yacht)
- U.S. National Register of Historic Places
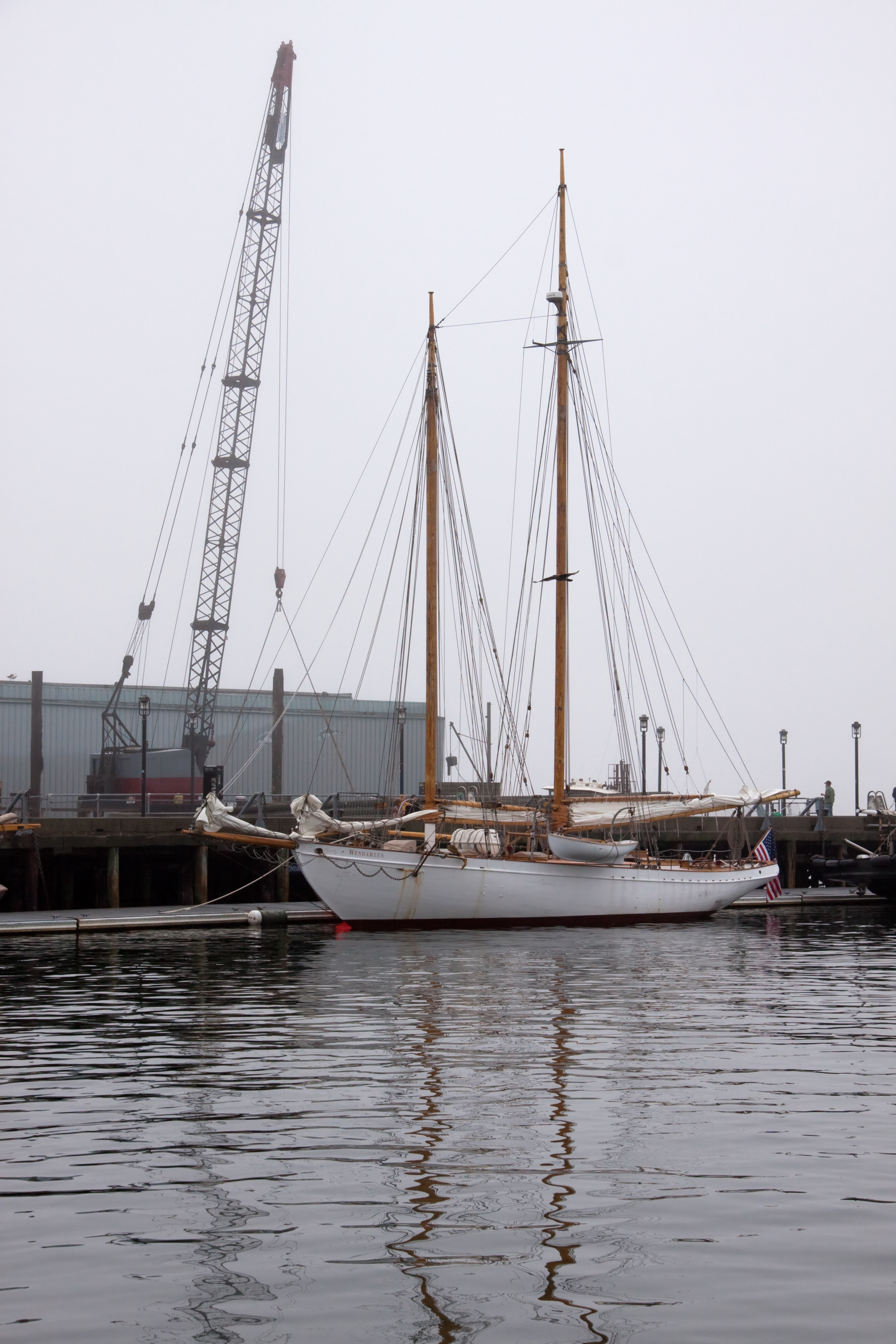

- Location within Maine Location within the United States
- Location: Maine State Pier, Portland, Maine
- Coordinates: 43°39′26″N 70°14′55″W
- Area: less than one acre
- Built: 1912
- Architect: John G. Alden
- NRHP reference No.: 92000273
- Added to NRHP: March 26, 1992

Wendameen is a historic schooner normally berthed at the Maine State Pier on Commercial Street in Portland, Maine. She is the first two-masted auxiliary rigged schooner, designed by the noted naval architect John G. Alden in 1912. She is now owned and operated by the Portland Schooner Company, which offers sailing tours of Casco Bay, using Wendameen and Bagheera. Wendameen was listed on the National Register of Historic Places in 1992.

== Description and history ==
Wendameen is a wooden two-masted auxiliary schooner, measuring 67 feet (20 m) in length, with a 51-foot (16 m) deck and a 17-foot (5.2 m) beam. She is rigged with a gaff-headed schooner rig. She is fitted below decks with staterooms trimmed in mahogany, and has a rated carrying capacity of 41 passengers.

Wendameen was designed in 1912 for businessman Chester Bliss by John G. Alden. She was built at the Adams Shipyard in East Boothbay, Maine. She is the twenty-first recreational fisherman design executed by Alden, and is one of the oldest to survive. In 1915 Bliss sold her to Erwin C. Uihlein, who sailed her for about 20 years on the Great Lakes. In 1933 she was purchased by Gerald W. Ford, a yacht dealer. Hauled out and partially restored, she languished on land until being sold in 1985 to Neal Parker. Parker gave her a full restoration, and began using her for "windjammer" cruises, based out of Camden, Maine. She is now owned by the Portland Schooner Company, and is used for charters and two-hour cruises out of Portland.

== See also ==
- National Register of Historic Places listings in Portland, Maine
