= Worldcruiser 44 =

Sailboat class

Development
- Designer: Bud Taplin
- Location: United States
- Year: 1980
- No. built: 3
- Builder: Worldcruiser Yacht Company
- Role: Cruiser
- Name: Worldcruiser 44

Boat
- Displacement: 23,000 lb (10,433 kg)
- Draft: 6.17 ft (1.88 m)

Hull
- Type: Monohull
- Construction: Fiberglass
- LOA: 43.92 ft (13.39 m)
- LWL: 32.75 ft (9.98 m)
- Beam: 11.00 ft (3.35 m)
- Engine: 25 hp (19 kW) diesel engine

Hull appendages
- Keel: modified long keel
- Ballast: 8,500 lb (3,856 kg)
- Rudder: skeg-mounted rudder

Rig
- Rig type: staysail schooner

Sails
- Sailplan: Two-masted schooner
- Total sail area: 1,011.00 sq ft (93.925 m^{2})

The Worldcruiser 44 is an American sailboat that was designed by Bud Taplin as a cruiser and first built in 1980.

== Production ==
The design was built by the Worldcruiser Yacht Company in the United States. The company commenced production in 1980 and completed three boats, but it is now out of production.

== Design ==
The Worldcruiser 44 is a recreational keelboat, built predominantly of fiberglass, with wood trim. It has a two-masted schooner rig, with painted aluminum spars, a spooned raked stem with a bowsprit, a raised counter transom with a boomkin, a skeg-mounted rudder controlled by a wheel and a fixed modified long keel, with a cutaway forefoot. It displaces 23,000 lb (10,433 kg) and carries 8,500 lb (3,856 kg) of lead ballast.

The boat has a draft of 6.17 ft (1.88 m) with the standard keel fitted.

The boat is fitted with a diesel engine of 25 to 50 hp (19 to 37 kW) for docking and maneuvering. The fuel tank holds 60 U.S. gallons (230 L; 50 imp gal) and the fresh water tank also has a capacity of 60 U.S. gallons (230 L; 50 imp gal).

The design has sleeping accommodation for five people, with a double berth forward, an L-shaped settee and table in the main cabin and an aft cabin with a double berth on the port side. The galley is located on the port side at the foot of the companionway ladder. The galley is U-shaped and is equipped with a three-burner stove, an oven and a double sink. Two desks with chart stowage and bookcases provide navigation station space on the starboard side, aft of the companionway. The head is located forward of the front berth and includes a shower and pressurized water. The headroom below decks is 76 in (190 cm). The forepeak has separate sail and chain lockers.

Ventilation is provided by four opening hatches, plus bronze ports.

For sailing the design is equipped with booms on all sails, save the forward jib. All booms have sheet travelers. The boat can mount a large genoa and gollywobbler, which is a large staysail mounted in between the two masts.

== Operational history ==
In a 1994 review Richard Sherwood wrote, "Worldcruiser feels that the sails on a boat over 40 feet should be small enough to handle without a large crew and that two-masted rigs are the answer. In light weather, flying a genoa instead of the headsails, and with a gollywobbler in place of the foresail and fisherman, the boat has a total sail area of over 2,000 square feet."

== See also ==
- List of sailing boat types

Similar sailboats

- Alden 44
- Nauticat 44
