= Bagheera (schooner) =

- U.S. National Register of Historic Places
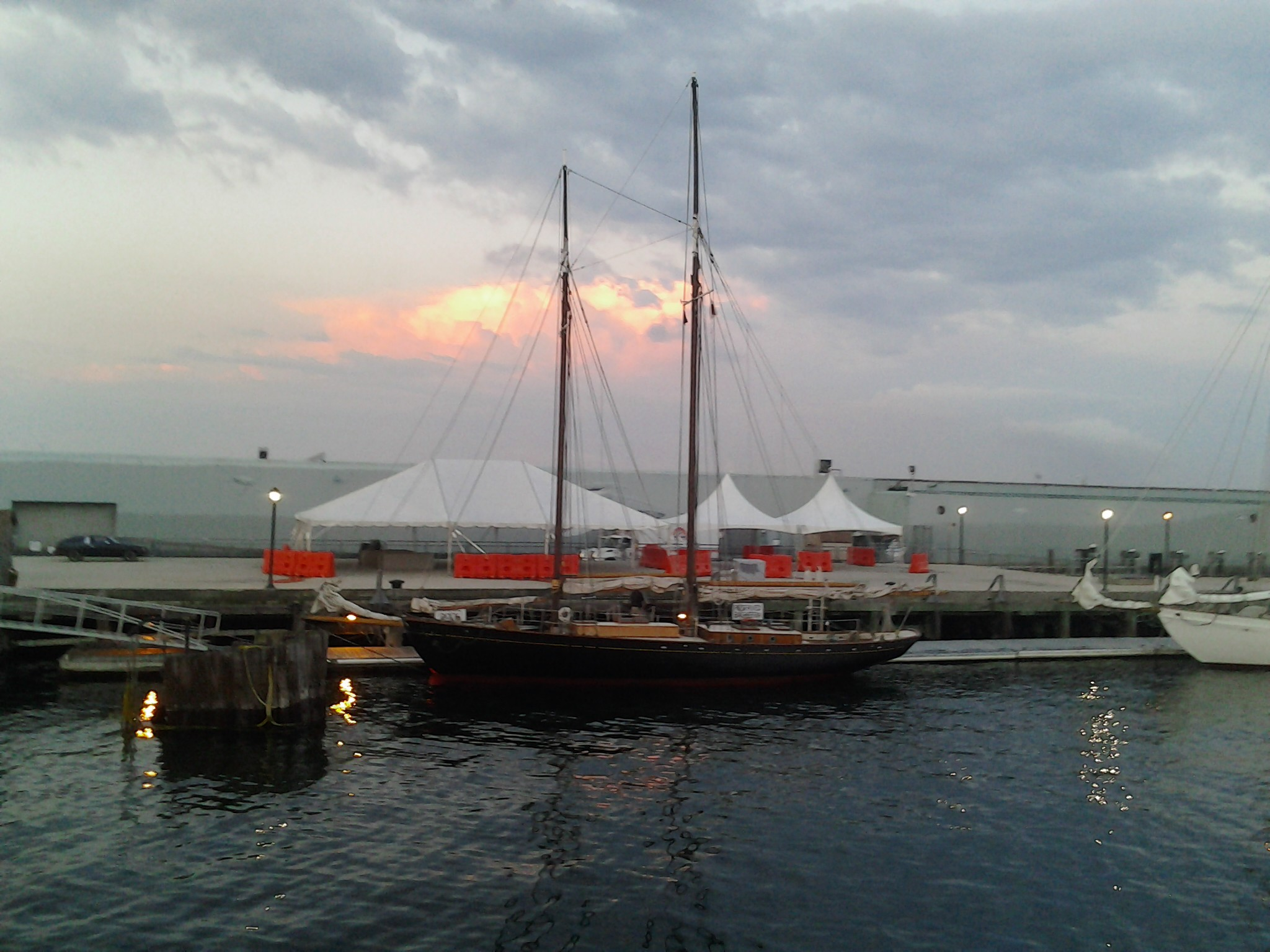

- Location within Maine Location within the United States
- Location: Maine State Pier, Commercial St., Portland, Maine
- Coordinates: 43°39′21″N 70°14′52″W
- Area: less than one acre
- Built: 1923
- Built by: Rice Brothers Shipyard
- Architect: John G. Alden
- Architectural style: Auxiliary Schooner
- NRHP reference No.: 09000878
- Added to NRHP: November 4, 2009

Bagheera, formerly Beacon Rock, is a historic schooner normally berthed at the Maine State Pier in Portland, Maine. She is a two-masted auxiliary rigged schooner, built in 1924 by the noted naval architect John G. Alden, and is noted for her racing success on the Great Lakes. She is now owned and operated by the Portland Schooner Company, which offers sailing tours of Casco Bay, using Bagheera and Wendameen. Bagheera was listed on the National Register of Historic Places in 2009.

== Description and history ==
Bagheera is a wooden-hulled auxiliary schooner, measuring 72 feet (22 m) in length with a deck of 55 feet (17 m). Her beam is 14 feet 2 inches (4.32 m), and she has a draft of 7 feet 6 inches (2.29 m). Her frame is white oak, with pine planking, flooring, and ceilings. Her rails are mahogany, and her bowsprit and spars are sitka spruce. The deck is fiberglass (a replacement for the original teak), laid on oak beams. The outside of the hull is painted black. Her present rigging, similar to the original, is gaff rigging. The auxiliary power is provided by a c. 2000 82 horsepower Westerbeke diesel engine. The interior retains substantial woodwork and equipment, including its original wheel.

Bagheera was built at the Rice Brothers Shipyard in East Boothbay, Maine, in 1924, to a design by John G. Alden, by then already a well-known designer of sailing ships. Her design is of a class known as Malabar schooners, although she is both longer and wider than most instances of the class. She was built for Marion Eppley, and was originally called Beacon Rock, after her estate in Newport, Rhode Island. Eppley berthed her at Newport, and sold her in 1928 to Robert Benedict. He renamed her Bagheera, and moved her to Chicago, where she embarked on a successful racing career on the Great Lakes, which lasted roughly until 1938. She was used as a training vessel during World War II, and was shipped to the Mediterranean Sea in the 1950s and sailed back to the United States. In 1948 her gaff rigging was replaced by a Marconi rig. By the 1980s she had been sailed to the west coast, and outfitted for passenger trade. "Bagheera" is now being used as a floating universal classroom for students and professors from Saint Joseph's College's Environmental Science Semester. Weather permitting, the schooner becomes a temporary home and lab, carrying the crew Downeast for two weeks to study climate change and glacial geology, field methods, marine ecology, and oceanography.

== See also ==
- National Register of Historic Places listings in Portland, Maine
