= Kevin J. Sharpe =

Kevin James Sharpe (23 January 1950 – 6 November 2008) was a mathematician, theologian, archaeologist, Anglican priest and professor at Union Institute & University.

He was known for his publications on the relationship between religion and science, on the interpretation of quantum physics by David Bohm, as well as for his investigations with Leslie Van Gelder on finger flutings in the Rouffignac cave.

== Education ==
In 1975, he obtained a Ph.D. in mathematics from La Trobe University, Melbourne, Australia, under supervision of Graham Elton, with a thesis entitled “Relationships between Group Topologies”.

In 1976, Sharpe was ordained as an Anglican priest.

He obtained a second Ph.D. in religious studies in 1987 from Boston University, Boston, Massachusetts, for work performed under supervision of Professors Robert S. Cohen of the Philosophy Department, and Harold H. Oliver with the topic “Christian Theology and the Physics, Metaphysics, and Mathematics of David Bohm”, which later led to his book published in 1993.

== Career ==
Since 1987, Kevin Sharpe was professor in the Graduate College of the Union Institute & University, Cincinnati, and associate director of research at the Ian Ramsey Centre for Science and Religion, University of Oxford, England.

He was editor of Theology and the Sciences of the Fortress Press series as of 1991, founding editor of Science & Spirit, and member of the advisory boards of Anthropology of Consciousness, of Zygon: Journal of Religion & Science and of the Center for Humility Theology at the John Templeton Foundation.

Sharpe authored more than 130 journal articles.

== Finger flutings ==
Together with his second wife, Dr. Mary Catherine Lacombe, Kevin J. Sharpe wrote several articles on finger flutings, after doing research in the Rouffignac cave and in Australian caves. Dr. Lacombe, who had a PhD in writing along with experience in childhood education made the connection between these finger flutings and mnemonic devices that young children use. <Line Markings as Systems of Notation? (with Mary Lacombe). In News 95: International Rock Art Congress – North, East, West, South, 1995 IRAC – 30 August-6 September 1995 – Proceedings (Pinerolo, Italy: IFRAO – International Federation of Rock Art Organizations, 1999), p. 46> and <NEWS 95 – International Rock Art Congress Proceedings_files/sharp.htm>.) Continuing with his third wife Leslie Van Gelder, Kevin J. Sharpe, pursued his interest in archaeology lectured extensively on early cave paintings and markings, in particular on finger flutings by men, women, and children in the Rouffignac cave. They continued to interpret these as early mnemonic devices and a precursor to writing.

== Books ==
- Kevin J. Sharpe: Science of God: Truth in the Age of Science, Rowman and Littlefield, 2006, ISBN 978-0742542679
- Kevin J. Sharpe, Rebecca Bryant: Has Science Displaced the Soul? Debating Love and Happiness, Rowman and Littlefield, 2005, ISBN 978-0742542648
- Kevin J. Sharpe: Sleuthing the Divine: The Nexus of Science and Spirit, Minneapolis, Fortress Press, 2000, ISBN 978-0800632366
- Kevin J. Sharpe: David Bohm's World: New Physics and New Religion, Bucknell University Press, 1993, ISBN 978-0838752395
- Kevin J. Sharpe: From Science to an Adequate Mythology, Science, Religion, and Society Series, No. 1, 1984, ISBN 978-0864740007
