= Leslie Ronald Jones =

American photographer

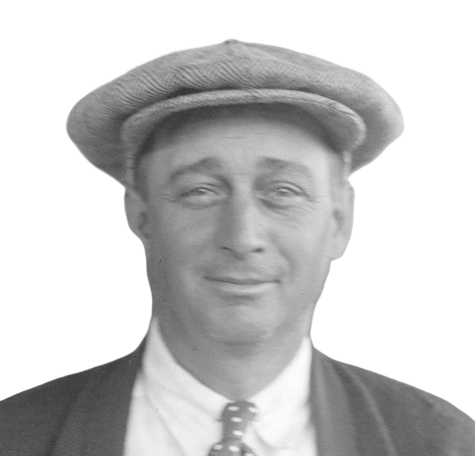
- Born: October 12, 1886; Cotuit, Massachusetts
- Died: December 8, 1967 (aged 81); Boston, Massachusetts
- Occupation: Photographer

Signature
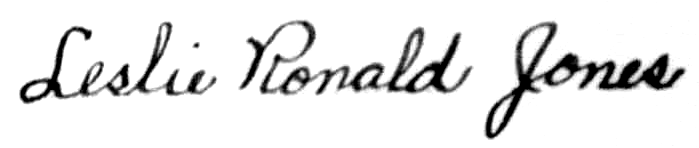

Leslie Ronald Jones (October 12, 1886 – December 8, 1967), was a Boston, Massachusetts, photographer who worked for Boston Herald-Traveler newspaper for 39 years from 1917 to 1956. His photographs document both everyday life and portraits of newsmakers and celebrities in Boston, Massachusetts.

== Biography ==
He was born on October 12, 1886, in Cotuit, Massachusetts.

He was orphaned at an early age and attended the Boston Asylum and Farm School for Indigent Boys on Thompson Island. He was interested in photography while in school.

He married Lillian E. Anderson (1893-?) around 1916 and they had a daughter, Lillian W. Jones (1916-?).

He worked as a wooden pattern maker at the Sturtevant Aeroplane Company since at least 1917. He freelanced as a photographer for the Herald-Traveler starting in 1917. By 1920 he was still working as a pattern maker, but for a ship builder.

After losing two fingers in an industrial accident he joined the Herald-Traveler staff as a full-time photographer by at least 1930. He spent 39 years at the newspaper both as a freelancer and as a full-time employee.

Jones died on December 8, 1967, in Boston, Massachusetts.

== Legacy ==
A collection of almost 40,000 of his negatives is stored in the Boston Public Library. A digital library dedicated to the collection was independently developed.
