= Quebec-Labrador Foundation =

The Quebec-Labrador Foundation/Atlantic Centre for the Environment (QLF) is a not-for-profit organization in the U.S. and a registered charity in Canada. QLF's mission is twofold: to support the rural communities and environment of eastern Canada and New England, and to create models for stewardship and cultural heritage that can be applied worldwide.

Headquartered in Ipswich, Massachusetts, QLF has an office in Montreal, Quebec, and seven Field Desks throughout New England and into Atlantic Canada (Newfoundland and Labrador, and the Quebec North Shore). The root of all of QLF’s programs, which began in the early 60s and continues through to today, is a belief in investing in the potential of each individual, and a belief that larger programs need to be identified and supported by the communities themselves.

== History ==
Founded in 1961 by the Reverend Robert (Bob) Bryan, QLF was originally established as the Quebec-Labrador Foundation Mission, which in 1969 became the Quebec-Labrador Foundation or simply QLF. Travelling by float plane, Bob visited the small "outport" communities of eastern Canada, bringing friendship, his talents as a clergyman, and the idea that the children in these communities should benefit from a new generation of community services, focused on leadership, education in the arts, marine and aviation skills, and creative thinking. Following in the tradition of Sir Wilfred Grenfell (Grenfell Mission), Bob led hundreds of high school and college students to the communities of the Quebec-Labrador Region to provide leadership in developing education and recreation for young people. He also developed scholarship funds, which continue to provide assistance for young people in eastern Canada.

In 1975, QLF expanded from community service programs to the realm of environmental education. Founding the Living Rivers Program in Tabusintac, New Brunswick, QLF established what would become one of QLF's hallmarks: cross border, community-based conservation and stewardship programs aimed at both young people and established conservation professionals.

In the early 1980s, QLF expanded its programs internationally to Western Europe, Central and Southeast Europe, Latin America, and the Middle East. Through exchange programs, study tours and professional meetings, QLF offers conservation and cultural heritage organizations an opportunity to share knowledge and build partnerships across geographic boundaries, as well as across public, private, and non-profit/non-governmental sectors.
