= Alexander Marshack =

American archaeologist (1918–2004)

Alexander Marshack (April 4, 1918 – December 20, 2004) was an American independent scholar and Paleolithic archaeologist. He was born in The Bronx and earned a bachelor's degree in journalism from City College of New York, and worked for many years for Life magazine.

== Archaeology career ==
Despite lacking a PhD, Marshack became a research associate at the Peabody Museum of Archaeology and Ethnology at Harvard University in 1963 with the support of Hallam L. Movius, giving him access to state and university archaeological collections that he would not otherwise have been able to view. He rose to public prominence after the publication of The Roots of Civilization in 1972, where he proposed the controversial theory that notches and lines carved on certain Upper Paleolithic bone plaques were in fact notation systems, specifically lunar calendars notating the passage of time.

Using microscopic analysis, Marshack suggested that seemingly random or meaningless notches on bone were sometimes interpretable as structured series of numbers. For instance, Marshack hypothesized that notches on the bone plaque from the Grotte de Thaïs in southern France (which dates to approximately 12,000 BP) were structured in subsets of 29 notches, thus suggesting that they were used to mark the duration between two lunations.

Prior to Marshack's work, many Paleolithic archaeologists focused their work on art such as the cave drawings at Lascaux, but paid little attention to the abstract notches and marks on plaques and other artifacts found at these sites. Marshack's work has been criticized as having over-interpreted many artifacts, finding numerical and calendrical patterns where none exist. Nonetheless, his work had a major impact on the study of Paleolithic art. In 2010 a book was published in his honor with contributions from many in the field.

Following a stroke in 2003, his health was in decline, and he died in December 2004.

== Links ==
- Bahn, Paul G., ed. 2009 An Enquiring Mind: Studies in Honor of Alexander Marshack. Oxford: Oxbow Books.
