= John Alden (naval architect) =

American naval architect

John Gale Alden
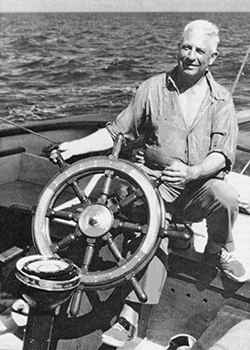
- Born: 1884; Troy, New York
- Died: 1962 (aged 78); Florida
- Education: Massachusetts Institute of Technology
- Occupation: Architect
- Practice: Alden Designs

John Gale Alden (1884–1962) was an American naval architect and the founder of Alden Designs.

== Early life ==
Alden was born in Troy, New York, in 1884, one of eight children, only four of whom survived. His family's summer holidays were spent on the Sakonnet in Rhode Island and on the Narragansett Bay, where he first learned about boats. He sailed his sister's flat-bottomed rowing boat using an umbrella as a sail and was said to be inspired by the local fisherman and regattas.

At 18 years old, his father died, and Alden made the decision to train as a naval architect. He took courses at MIT and apprenticed with prominent naval architects Starling Burgess and Bowdoin B. Crowninshield, starting in 1902.

In 1900, his family moved to Dorchester, Massachusetts, where the Grand Banks fishing schooners were docked. These were said to have inspired his later designs. A compulsive doodler, as a child he made countless sketches of the boats that were later to make him famous.

== Career ==
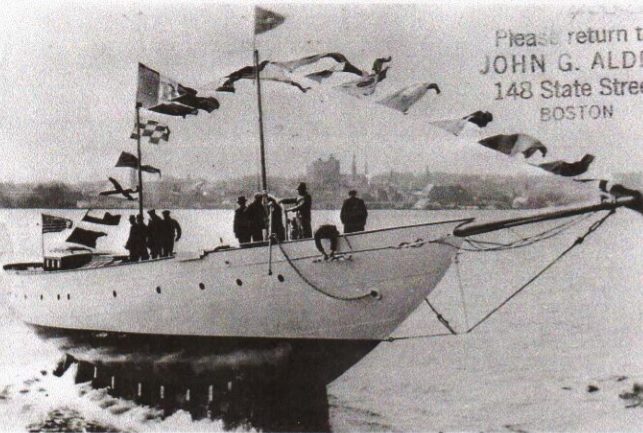
The Puritan, a schooner designed by Alden, being launched in 1931.

In the winter of 1907, Alden undertook a voyage that would define his distinctive design trademark: The schooner Fame, owned by the Eastern Fishing company, had to be returned to Boston when her crew of 23 men had gone down with smallpox and there was no one left to sail her. Alden put together a crew of four inexperienced young men and one old salt to undertake the journey. During the weeks that followed, they experienced extreme winter weather of up to 60 mile an hour winds that turned the salt spray to ice. The boat, and the crew, completed the journey and it is said that Alden learned how to design a boat that would be resilient in heavy seas and what was important when a vessel was short-handed. His subsequent designs are admired not only for their grace and elegance but for their stability and for the fact that they can, generally, be sailed single-handedly if necessary.

After the voyage, Alden returned to the Burgess offices but left in 1909 to found his own company, the Alden Design Office in 1909.

=== Alden Design Office ===
The early years of the Alden Design were difficult and were said to have put a strain on his finances and on his marriage, which broke down after only three years. By 1917, business had improved and the offices were doing sufficiently well that by the 1920s, the office was able to employ specialist draftsmen. The approach Alden took was to discuss requirements with the clients, make the initial sketches and then hand over the work to the draftsmen to complete. Therefore, each boat designed by the firm had Alden's individual style stamped on.

By 1932, the Alden Design Office was known around the world due to the success of the "Malabar" designs in the offshore racing scene:

- In 1923, Malabar IV won the Newport–Bermuda race
- In 1926, Malabar VII won the Newport–Bermuda race
- In 1932, Malabar X won overall, with his other designs occupying the top four places.

When Alden achieved his great success in the 1932 Bermuda race, the yachting world was already beginning to see changes in boat design. Olin Stephens' yawl Dorade, which had already won the Transatlantic and Fastnet races in 1931, was the winner in Class B. Stephens followed this with another winner, Stormy Weather which won the 1936 Transatlantic Race to Norway by a wide margin. This began a long-running rivalry between the two designers. Alden's designs depended on a certain amount of inside ballast, where Stephens' adopted the idea of all-outside ballast. Stephens' boats were of lighter construction, using steam bent frames, rather than the sawn frames favored by Alden. Over the next thirty years, Alden designed over 1,000 boats, including the 63.5' schooner When and If for General Patton, though of them all the 744 Rena series have been considered the most admired. Eric Hiscock, a leading yachtsman of the time, said "I considered her to be one of the most beautiful yachts I had ever seen…quite perfect in (her) sea-kindly grace and harmony".

Al Spalding became the firm's chief designer after World War II, and occupied the role for fifteen years.

=== Later life ===
From the 1950s onwards, Alden took an increasingly less active role in the design business and retired in 1955. The Alden Design office carried on until 2008, under the helm of Niels Christian Helleberg, naval architect. Helleberg continued providing design and print services until closing his office in January 2014.

Alden continued to race into his seventies, and enjoyed sailing one of his Sakonnet One designs until his death in Florida at the age of 78. His designs were donated by the company to MIT's Hart Nautical Collections.

Alden was inducted into the National Sailing Hall of Fame in 2013.

== Selected designs ==
Alden created many designs, with the database listing over 1000 numbered designs, of which some 39 are shown at SailboatData.com.

Some of the more celebrated are shown below.

- Bagheera
- Ciara Madeline
- Clara Brown
- Gitana
- Malabar X
- Mayan
- Puritan
- Surazo
- La Goleta, (one of only two finishers in the 1927 Fastnet race, along with Tally Ho designed by Albert Strange )
- Wendameen
- When and If

== See also ==
- Carl Alberg
- Hodgdon Yachts
- Alden Triangle - sailboat designed by John Alden
