= Russell Van Gelder =

American clinician-scientist and ophthalmologist

Russell Van Gelder is an American clinician-scientist and board-certified ophthalmologist; he has served as the chair of the University of Washington Medicine Department of Ophthalmology since 2008 served as Editor-in-Chief of the journal Ophthalmology from 2022-2026. He is known for his research on the mechanisms of uveitis, non-visual photoreception in the eye, and vision-restoration methods for retinal degenerative disease, as well as his leadership and advisory positions in various American ophthalmological and medical societies.

== Education ==
Van Gelder graduated from Northern Valley Regional High School at Old Tappan in New Jersey in 1981. He attended Stanford University for his Bachelors, and MD/Ph.D.: receiving his bachelors in Biological Sciences in 1985, and his MD/Ph.D. in Neurosciences in 1994 as part of the MSTP, during which time he studied the molecular basis for circadian rhythms. He then completed an internal medicine internship at Stanford before moving to Washington University in St. Louis/Barnes-Jewish Hospital in 1995, where he was a resident in the Department of Ophthalmology and Visual Sciences. Here, Van Gelder also completed his Uveitis and Medical Retina fellowship in 1999, where he studied inflammation of the eye.

== Career ==
Van Gelder joined the Washington University in St. Louis faculty full-time as an assistant professor in 1999. A year later, he also became an adjunct assistant professor of molecular biology and pharmacology. He was named Bernard Becker Professor of Ophthalmology and Visual Sciences in 2006. Van Gelder remained at Washington University until he moved to the University of Washington in 2007, where he has been involved in research on non-visual photoreception and pathogen detection in uveitis.

He currently serves as the Boyd K. Bucey Memorial Endowed Chair of Ophthalmology, Chairman of the Department of Ophthalmology, and Director of the Roger and Angie Karalis Johnson Retina Center at the University of Washington.

== Research ==
The Van Gelder Lab, funded continuously since 1999 by the National Institutes of Health, develops photochemical methods to treat blindness and discover microorganisms associated with various eye diseases, such as ocular infectious diseases, including microbial keratitis, conjunctivitis, and endophthalmitis, which are a significant cause of blinding diseases. Using techniques such as deep sequencing and other molecular methods, the Van Gelder lab analyzes the host microbiome and analyzes pathologic strains of viruses and bacteria causing inflammatory eye disease. The Van Gelder lab is investigating synthetic small molecule photoswitches as a therapeutic for degenerative blinding diseases (such as age-related macular degeneration, which is caused by death of rods and cones). The Van Gelder lab is also working to understand mammalian circadian rhythms and studies mouse models to understand clock synchronization using light, cell-level research of light perception, and issues related to seasonal affective disorder.

Van Gelder has been published in a number of high-impact peer-reviewed scientific journals, including Science, Neuron, Nature, Nature Medicine, Nature Genetics, and Proceedings of the National Academy of Sciences. He has published over 200 different academic papers and book chapters.

=== Amplified RNA ===
Van Gelder's 1990 PNAS paper is one of his most influential and highly cited contribution to the fields of neuroscience and recombinant DNA technology. Prior to the publication of this paper, the cloning and analysis of low-abundance mRNAs in the brain was exceedingly difficult. However, working in Jack Barchas' lab at Stanford and in collaboration with Mark von Zastrow and James Eberwine, Van Gelder developed a technique called antisense RNA amplification that was able to generate amplified RNA populations from limited amounts of cDNA in order to obtain ample amounts of nucleic acid needed for standard cloning techniques. Eventually, Van Gelder and his coauthors were granted 5 patents for this amplification technique, the most recent in 2006.

This technique used a synthetic oligonucleotide primer containing a T7 RNA polymerase promoter sequence. This was able to generate large quantities (up to 80-fold) of amplified antisense RNA (aRNA) from significantly smaller samples of cDNA. This technique has been widely used in many molecular biology labs. Since its development, further applications of aRNA amplification have been devised, some of which include protein detection, whole-genome DNA amplification, and DNA microarray.

=== Intrinsically photosensitive retinal ganglion cells ===
In a 2005 Neuron paper, Van Gelder found that intrinsically photosensitive ganglion cells (ipRGCs), which are responsible for mediating non-visual processes such as entrainment, are the first light-sensitive cells in the retina. Using a micro-electrode array in the ipRGCs of murine mice, Van Gelder found that there are three distinct cell populations in the postnatal day 8 (P8) retina, varying in their speed of onset, offset, and sensitivity. Further investigation found that even the postnatal day 0 retina displayed some intrinsic light response, with increased photosensitivity around day 6. These findings suggest that ipRGCs are the first photosensitive cells in the development of the retina.

=== Neuropsin-mediated photoentrainment ===
In a 2015 PNAS paper, Van Gelder and colleagues (with first author former postdoctoral fellow Ethan Buhr) found that Opsin-5 is sufficient for the entrainment of the molecular circadian clock in the mammalian retina. Entrainment to light in the mammalian retina is independent of the suprachiasmatic nucleus (SCN) and does not require rods, cones, or melanopsin. While the short-wavelength sensitive cone pigments OPN1SW and OPN3 are not required for entrainment, Van Gelder's group found that retinas that lack OPN5, which are expressed in select retinal ganglion cells, are unable to entrain even though these cells still maintain normal visual functions. Additionally, Van Gelder's lab found that OPN5 was sufficient in entraining the circadian rhythms of mice cornea ex-vivo, ascertaining the function of OPN5, which until then was classified as an orphan opsin.

=== Detection and treatment of uveitis ===
Van Gelder has worked extensively on the use of optical coherence tomography (OCT), a non-invasive imaging technique that uses low-coherence light to capture micrometer resolution images. Van Gelder's work in this field has included the use of spectral-domain optical coherence tomography (SD-OCT), which involves the use of a line-scan camera, instead of a spectrometer as is conventionally used in OCT. This allows for faster and higher resolution imaging . Van Gelder has used SD-OCT to image the inflammation associated with uveitis in rat models , as well as other macular degeneration.

== Memberships ==
Van Gelder currently serves on the Council of Councils to the National Institutes of Health. He was appointed as Editor-in-Chief for the flagship journal Ophthalmology, the most widely read ophthalmology clinical publication, by the American Academy of Ophthalmology in February 2022.

Van Gelder is past-president of the American Academy of Ophthalmology (AAO, 2015), the American Uveitis Society (2010–12), and the Association of University Professors of Ophthalmology (AUPO, 2018). He previously served as Chair of the AAO Council and gave the keynote Jackson Memorial Lecturer at the 2021 Annual AAO Meeting in New Orleans, LA.

== Awards and certifications ==
Van Gelder is the recipient of numerous awards for his research including:

- Research to Prevent Blindness Career Development Award
- Culpeper Foundation Clinician-Scientist Award
- Translational Scientist Award of the Burroughs-Wellcome Foundation
- Bressler Award from the Lighthouse Guild
- Heed-Gutman Award of the Heed Society
- Audacious Goals Award of the National Eye Institute
- Schepens Award of the Retina Research Foundation

He has given over 30 named lectureships and over 200 invited lectures.
