= Ablade Glover =

Ghanaian artist and educator (born 1934)

Ablade Glover FGA, FRSA, CV
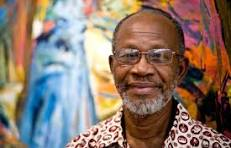
- Born: Emmanuel Ablade Glover; 1934 (age 91–92); Accra, Greater Accra Region, Gold Coast
- Known for: Visual art, painting
- Awards: Flagstar Award

Ablade Glover FGA FRSA CV (born 1934) is a Ghanaian painter and educator. He has exhibited widely, building an international reputation over several decades, as well as being regarded as a seminal figure on the West African art scene. His work is held in many prestigious private and public collections, which include the Imperial Palace of Japan, the UNESCO headquarters in Paris, France, and O'Hare International Airport, Chicago, United States.

Glover has received several national and international awards, including the Order of the Volta in Ghana, and he is a Life Fellow of the Royal Society of Arts in London. He was Associate Professor, Head of the Department of Art Education and Dean of the College of Art at the Kwame Nkrumah University of Science and Technology until 1994.

== Early life and education ==
Born in the La community of Accra, in what was then the Gold Coast (present-day Ghana), Emmanuel Ablade Glover had his early education at Presbyterian mission schools. He had his teacher training education at the Kwame Nkrumah University of Science and Technology, Kumasi (1957–58), before winning a scholarship to study textile design at London's Central School of Art and Design (1959–62).

Glover returned to Ghana to teach for a while, before another scholarship, given by Kwame Nkrumah, enabled Glover to study art education at the University of Newcastle upon Tyne (1964–65); it was there that Glover began to use the tool that shaped his technique when his teacher suggested a palette knife to apply paint, rather than brushes. Glover went on to further his education in the US, first at Kent State University, where he earned his master's degree, and then at Ohio State University, where he was awarded a PhD in 1974.

== Career ==
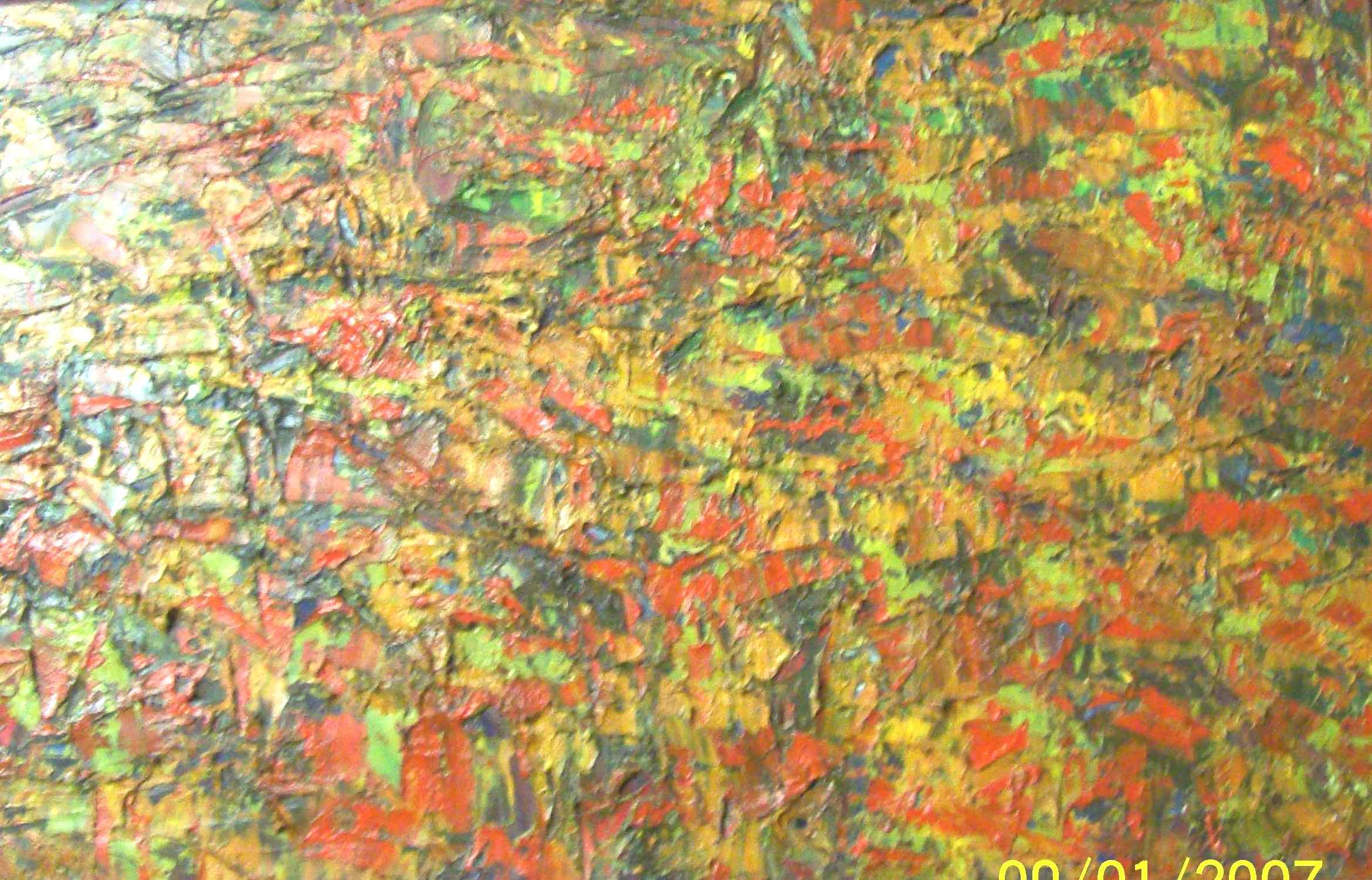
Glover's Painting in Yellow, oil on canvas

=== Academic ===
Returning to Ghana after receiving his doctorate, Glover taught for the next two decades at the College of Art in the University of Kumasi, becoming Department Head and College Dean. He rose to the rank of associate professor within that period.

=== Artists Alliance Gallery ===
He founded the Accra-based Artists Alliance Gallery, which has roots in an earlier gallery he founded in the 1960s and in its new incarnation was opened by Kofi Annan in 2008. As well as being an outlet for Glover's own work, this gallery features the work of other significant Ghanaian artists such as Owusu-Ankomah and George O. Hughes, together with collectible local artifacts.

== Style ==
Glover's style has been described as "swirling between abstraction and realism", and his subject matter typically favours large urban landscapes, lorry parks, shantytowns, thronging markets and studies of the women of Ghana. Asked about his influences, he has said: "...if you notice, you see a lot of women in my work and people do ask me, why do you paint so many women? The first time I was asked the question, I didn't think about it. I just opened my mouth and said because they are more beautiful than men. That wasn't a serious answer. It was later, thinking about it, that it struck me they have courage. Women of Africa have some courage and they show it. When they walk the street, they are elegant. They are courageous, they are brave. When they are going about, they show it. Men don't do that, do they?"

== Honours and recognition ==
In 1998, Glover received the Flagstar Award from ACRAG (the Arts Critics and Reviewers Association of Ghana), and was also honoured with the distinguished alumni award from the African-American Institute in New York City. He has been honoured with several national and international awards, including the Order of the Volta in Ghana in 2007, the Millennium Excellence Award in 2010 and is a Life Fellow of the Royal Society of Arts, London. He is also a Fellow of the Ghana Academy of Arts and Sciences.

In July 2024, to celebrate Glover's 90th birthday, October Gallery mounted the solo exhibition Inner Worlds, Outer Journeys, having since 1982 devoted 10 shows to his work. As noted by African Business magazine: "Throughout his lifetime his reputation has grown beyond that of simply an artist, and he has become a mentor and role model for emerging African artists on the global stage, paving the way for the success of African artists."

== Selected exhibitions ==
- Visions & Dreams, Tasneem Gallery (13 March–31 May 2008)
- Ablade Glover: 75 Year Anniversary, October Gallery, London (2 July–1 August 2009)
- I See You, Tasneem Gallery (6 July–17 November 2010)
- Transmission Part 2, Tasneem Gallery, Barcelona, Spain (15 November 2012–30 March 2013)
- Ablade Glover: 80th Anniversary, October Gallery, London (3 July–2 August 2014)
- Ablade Glover: Inner Worlds, Outer Journeys, October Gallery, London (4 July–3 August 2024)

== See also ==
- Owusu-Ankomah
- George O. Hughes
