= Private View of the Old Masters Exhibition, Royal Academy, 1888 =

Painting by Henry Jamyn Brooks

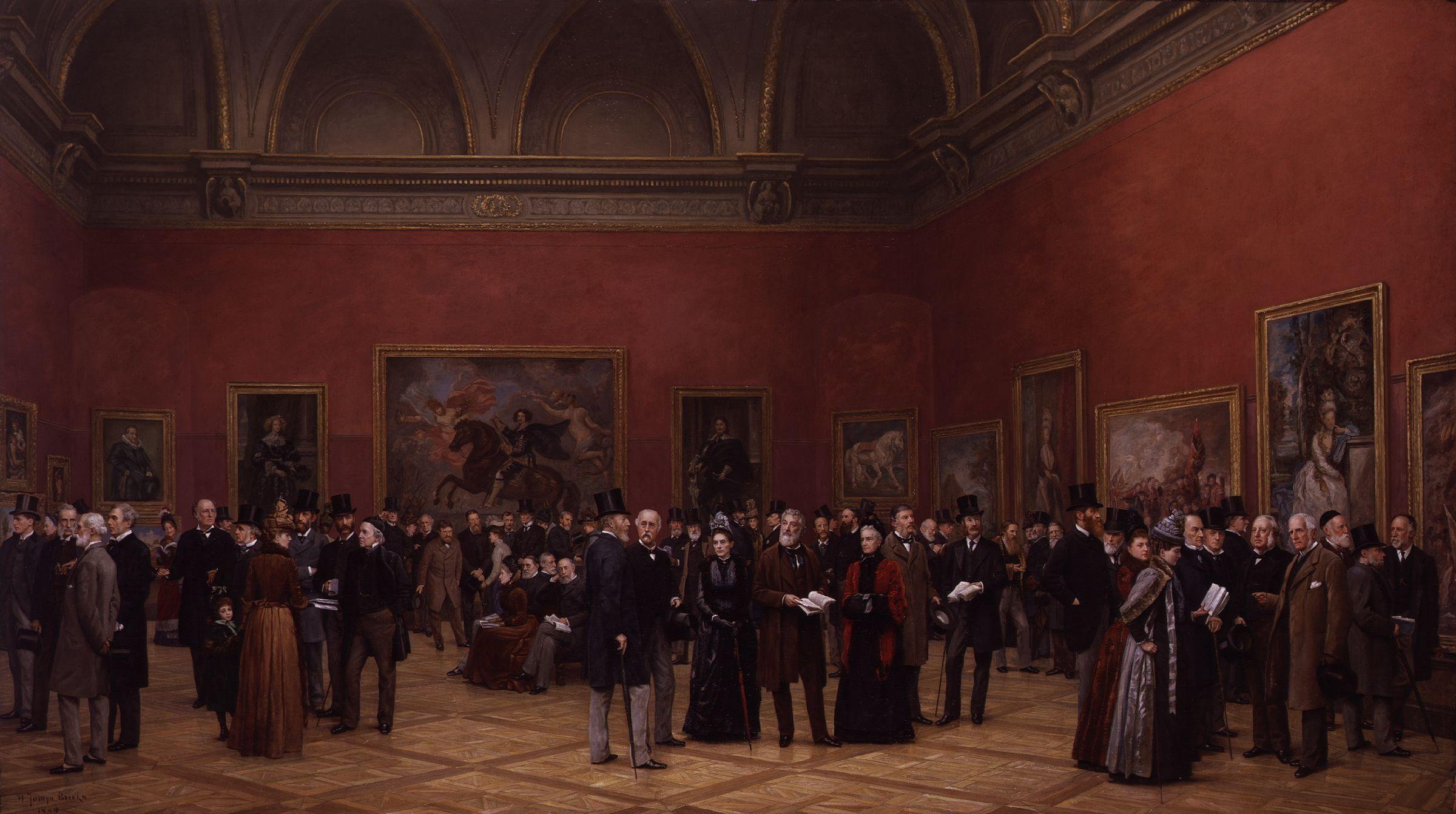
- Artist: Henry Jamyn Brooks
- Year: 1889
- Type: Oil on canvas, history painting
- Dimensions: 154.5 cm × 271.5 cm (60.8 in × 106.9 in)
- Location: National Portrait Gallery, London

Private View of the Old Masters Exhibition, Royal Academy, 1888 is an 1889 history painting by the British artist Henry Jamyn Brooks. It depicts a Private view held by the Royal Academy of Arts at Burlington House in London's Piccadilly. While the Summer Exhibition featured submissions of new art, the annual winter exhibition showcased works by Old Masters. The picture features sixty six portraits including many notable figures of the late Victorian era. Amongst those depicted are the Prime Minister William Gladstone, the art critic John Ruskin and the painters John Everett Millais, Frederic Leighton, William Holman Hunt, George Richmond, Frank Holl, Marcus Stone, John Callcott Horsley, George Frederic Watts, William Powell Frith, Lawrence Alma-Tadema, Philip Hermogenes Calderon, Edward Poynter, William Quiller Orchardson, Frederic William Burton and Henry Tanworth Wells. The painting was exhibited in New Bond Street in 1889. It is now in the National Portrait Gallery, having been gifted by the artist in 1919.

== Bibliography ==
- Avery-Quash, Susanna & Pezzini, Barbara (ed.) Old Masters Worldwide: Markets, Movements and Museums, 1789–1939 Bloomsbury Publishing, 2020.
- Clarke, Alison. Spaces of Connoisseurship: Judging Old Masters at Agnew’s and the National Gallery, c.1874-1916. BRILL, 2022.
- Dakers, Caroline. Millionaire Shopping: The collections of Alfred Morrison, 1821-1897. UCL Press, 2025.
