= Manresa Road =

Street in London, England

Coordinates: 51°29′16.56″N 0°10′18.72″W

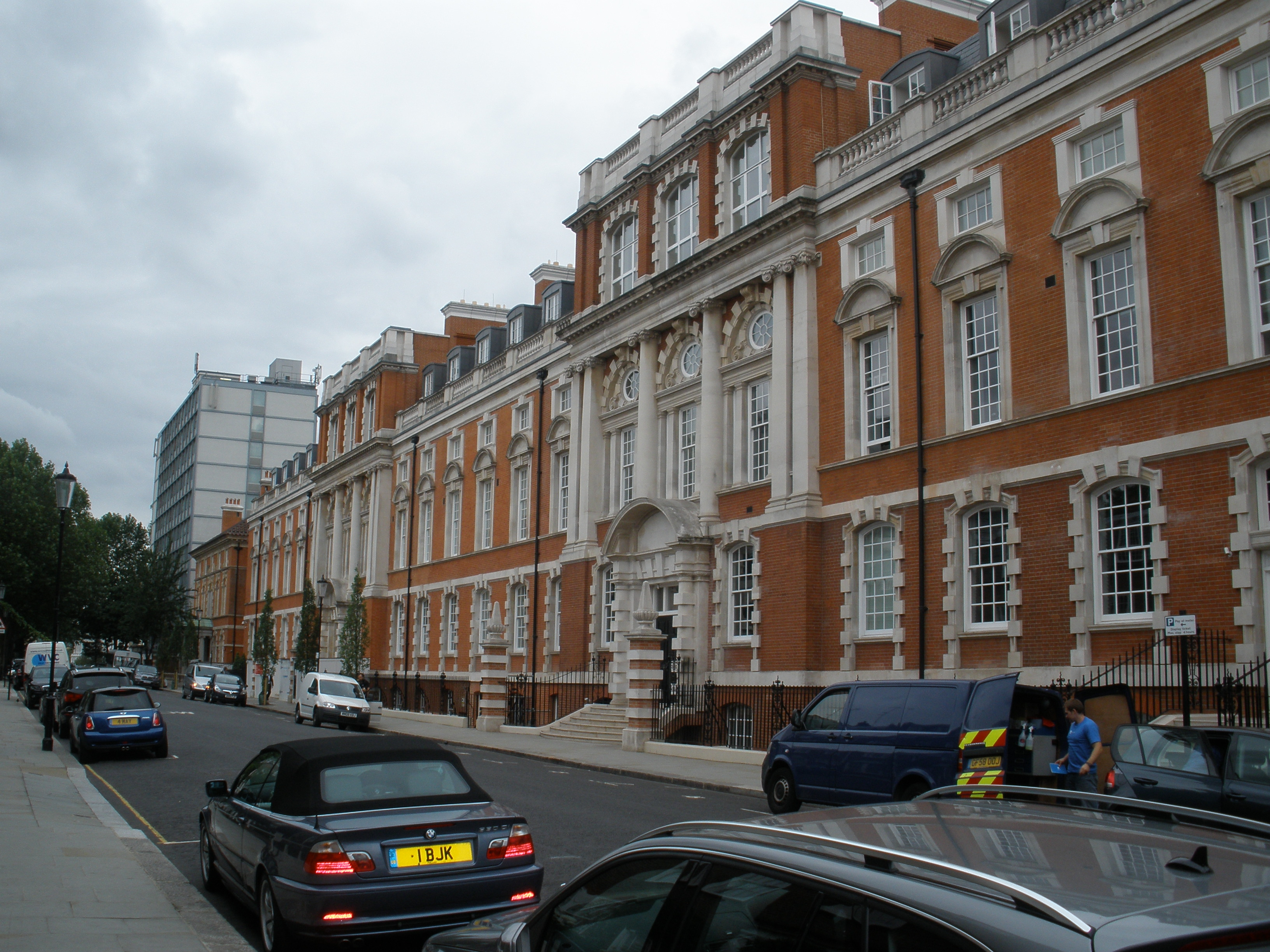
Former Chelsea College, Manresa Road, 2010

Manresa Road is a street in Chelsea, London. In 2015, it was the third most expensive street in England and Wales.

== Location ==
The street runs roughly north to south, from Chelsea Square to King's Road.

The Hampshire School is based at no 15.

== History ==
The former Chelsea College is now apartments.

The Trafalgar Studios was a set three-storey, 15-unit block of purpose-built artists' studios, built in 1878 by John Brass. Notable artists who have lived there include Henry Jamyn Brooks, Albert Arthur Toft, Edward Gordon Craig, Frank Brangwyn, Mervyn Peake, and Clifford Hall.

In December 2015, it was considered to be the third most expensive street in England, with an average property price of £7,359,000, according to research from Lloyds Bank, based on Land Registry data.

In April 2015, The Guardian reported that a British financier in his late 30s had agreed to buy an apartment at no.21, a 19th-century building, formerly part of Chelsea College of Science and Technology, for £27 million, making it the world's most expensive apartment. The building had been owned by Bernie Ecclestone, before being acquired and developed by Christian and Nick Candy.

== Notable residents ==
- Ernest Dade and Nelson Dawson rented studios at Manresa Road.
- Frank Dobson, sculptor, had a studio there during the interwar period.
