= Royal Academy Summer Exhibition =

Annual open art exhibition in England

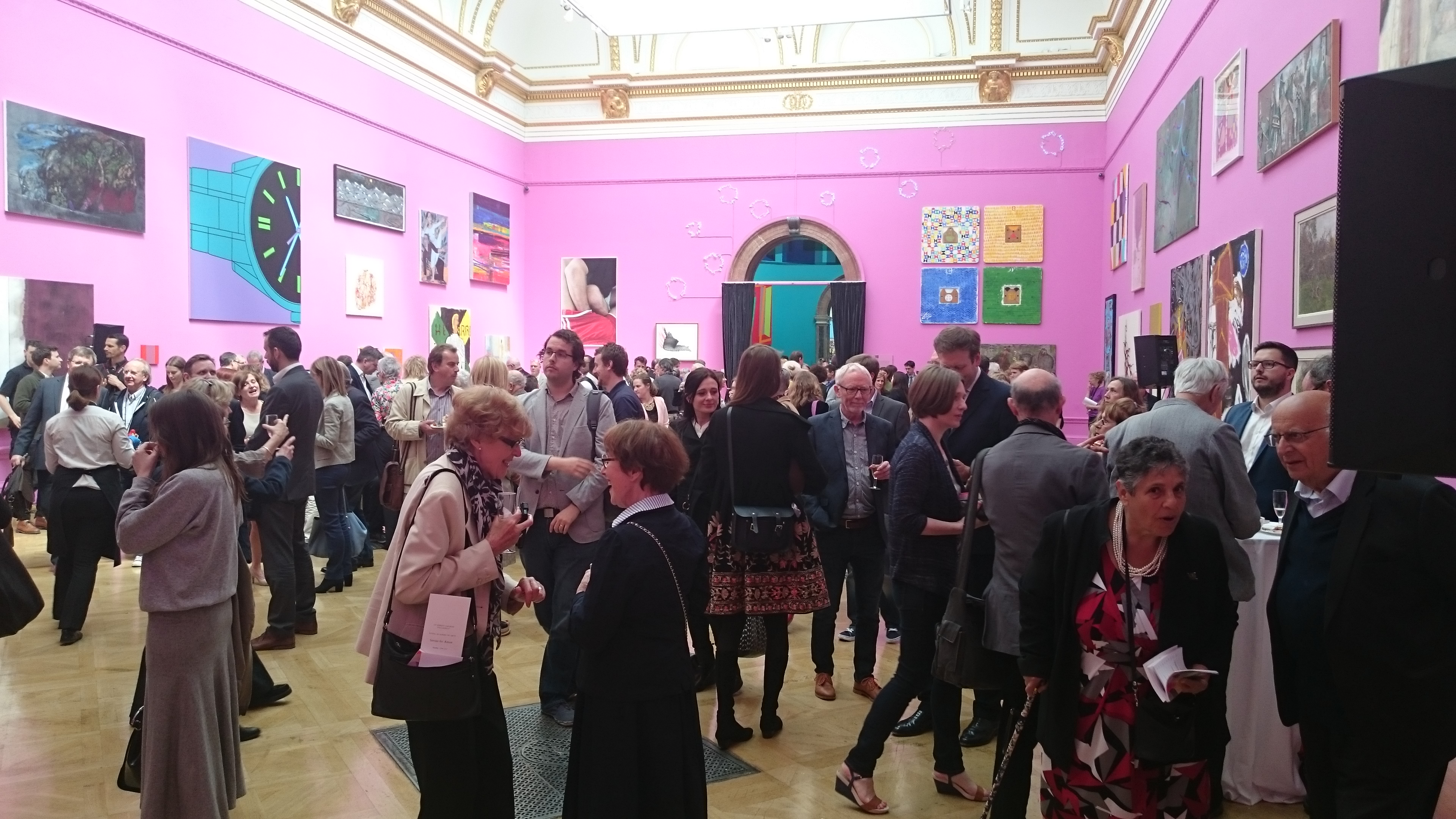
View of one of the main rooms, June 2015

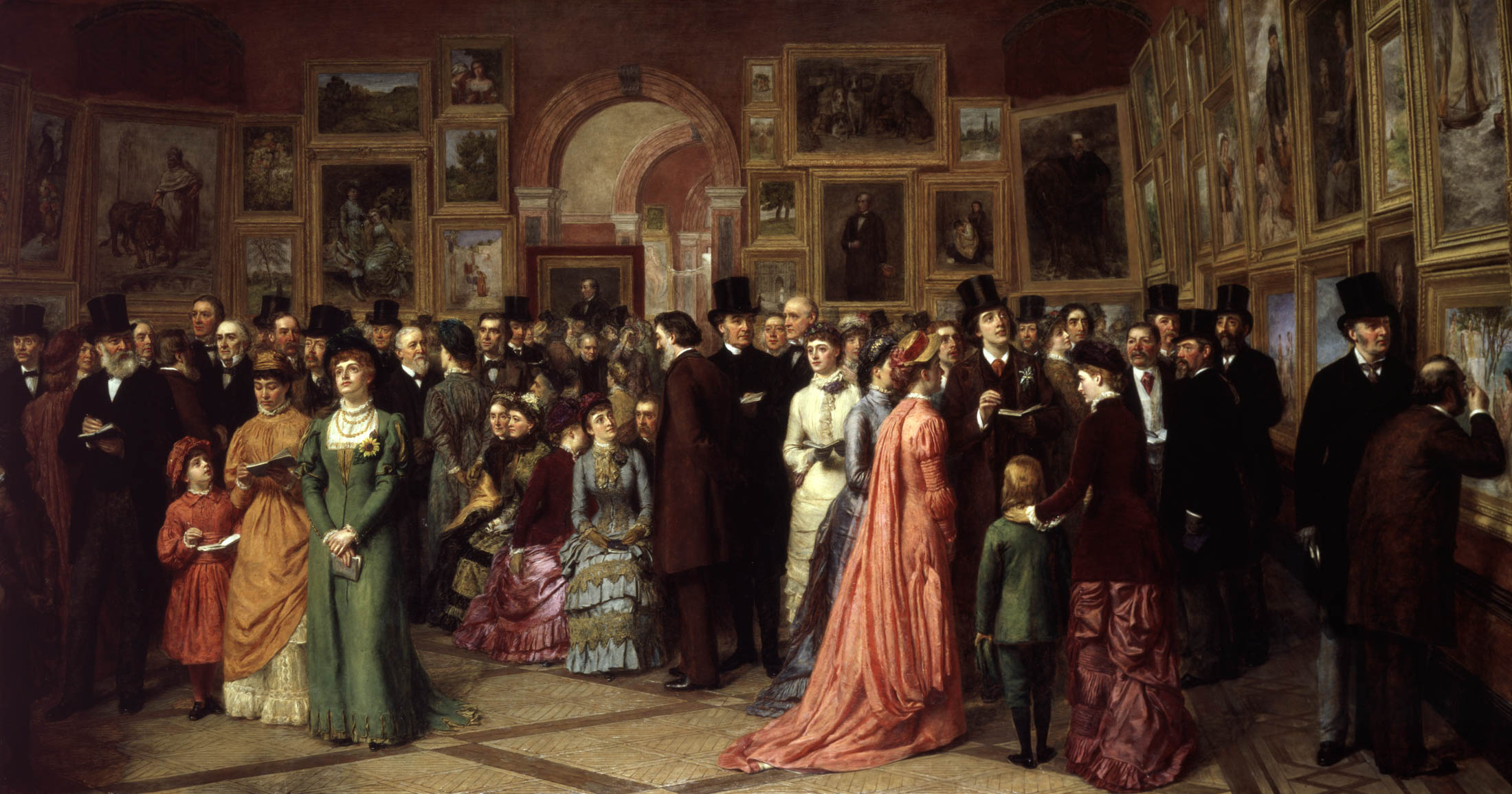
A Private View at the Royal Academy, 1881 by William Powell Frith, depicting Oscar Wilde and other Victorian worthies at a private view of the 1881 exhibition

The Summer Exhibition is an open art exhibition held annually by the Royal Academy in Burlington House, Piccadilly in central London, England, during June, July, and August. The exhibition includes paintings, prints, drawings, sculpture, architectural designs and models, and is described by the Royal Academy as the world's largest open-submission exhibition. It is also "the longest continuously staged exhibition of contemporary art in the world".

When the Royal Academy was founded in 1768, one of its key objectives was to establish an annual exhibition, open to all artists of merit, which could be visited by the public. The first Summer Exhibition took place in 1769; it has been held every year since without exception.

== History ==
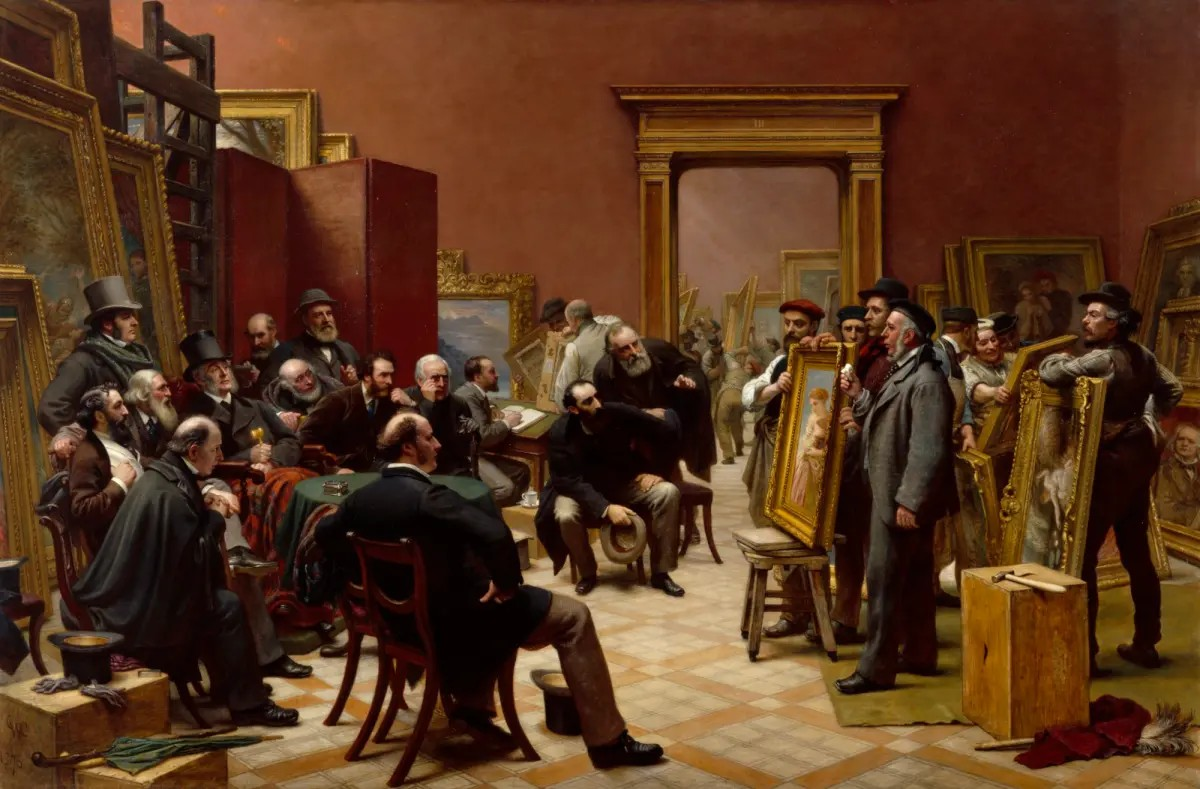
The Council of the Royal Academy Selecting Pictures for the Exhibition, 1875 by Charles West Cope

In 1768, a group of artists visited King George III and sought his permission to establish a society for Arts and Design. They proposed the idea of an annual exhibition and a school design. King George III approved of the idea, and the first exhibition, in 1769, included 136 works. The name Summer Exhibition dates from 1870.

== Selection process ==
For the 2006 exhibition, the academy received a statue and a plinth from David Hensel. By mistake, the two parts were judged independently, resulting in the statue being rejected and the plinth put on display. Some artists apply repeatedly before being selected: in 2024 Alison Aye's accepted piece Shifting to the Moon was her 31st submission.

== Exhibition ==
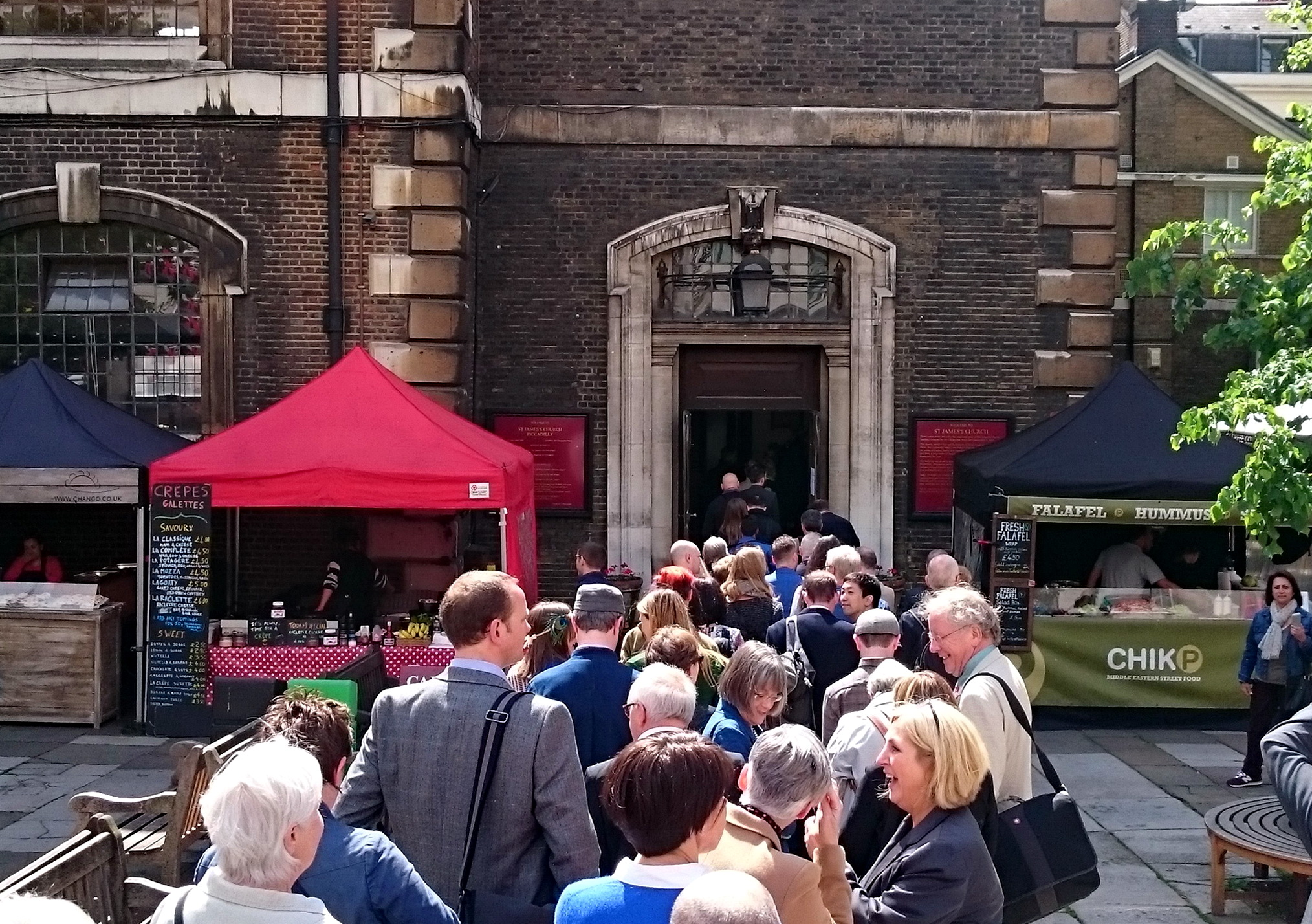
Participants in the RA Summer Exhibition 2015 at St. James, Piccadilly, on Varnishing Day

The RA Summer Exhibition usually opens to the public in early June, preceded by a series of private viewings. The main event is called "Varnishing Day", the day that, according to popular legend, artists would come to add a final coat of varnish to their paintings (compare: vernissage). Traditionally, artists walk in procession from Burlington House to St James's Church, Piccadilly, where a service is held.

Some years have particular themes. The 2005 exhibition theme was "Printmaking and the multiple". In 2006, the theme was "From Life." In 2008, the theme was "Man Made". The theme for 2010 was "Raw".

=== Coordinators ===
- 2005 Stephen Farthing and Christopher Orr
- 2010 Stephen Chambers
- 2011 Christopher Le Brun
- 2012 Tess Jaray
- 2013 Eva Jiřičná and Norman Ackroyd
- 2014 Hughie O'Donoghue
- 2015 Michael Craig-Martin
- 2016 Yinka Shonibare
- 2017 Eileen Cooper
- 2018 Grayson Perry
- 2019 Jock McFadyen
- 2020 Jane and Louise Wilson
- 2021 Yinka Shonibare
- 2022 Alison Wilding
- 2023 David Remfry
- 2024 Ann Christopher
- 2025 Farshid Moussavi

== Awards ==
Over £70,000 prize money, including the £25,000 Charles Wollaston Award, is awarded each year at the Summer Exhibition. In addition, a £10,000 architectural prize is awarded.

=== Winners of Charles Wollaston Award ===
Year	Artist	Artwork	Medium	Exhibited	View	Ref.
1978	Peter Greenham	Lady Bonham Carter	Oil on canvas	Gallery I	Tate	
1979	Roger de Grey	Marennes	Oil on canvas	Gallery III		
1980	Anthony Gross					
1981						
1982	Robert Buhler					
1983						
1984						
1985						
1986						
1987	John Bellany					
1988						
1989						
1990						
1991	Neil Jeffries					
1992	Sandra Blow	Whisperings	Acrylic	Gallery III		
1993						
1994	Robert Medley	Preparation for the Execution	Oil on canvas	Gallery II	Royal Academy	
1995	Barry Flanagan	The Cricketer	Bronze	Courtyard	Jesus College, Cambridge	
1996	Jeffery Camp					
1997	R. B. Kitaj	Sandra Three	Mixed media — view installation	Gallery II	Centrepiece at Astrup Fearnley Museet	
1998	John Hoyland	Tree Music 6.3.98	Acrylic on cotton	Gallery VI	Private Collection	
1999	David Hockney	A Bigger Grand Canyon	Oil on sixty canvases	Lecture Room	National Gallery of Australia	
2000	Gerard Hemsworth	Between Heaven and Hell 1998	Acrylic on canvas	Gallery IV		
2001	Marc Quinn	Catherine Long	Marble	Large Weston Room		
2002	Alan Charlton	Vertical Painting in 20	Acrylic on canvas	Gallery IV		
2003	Jake and Dinos Chapman	Marriage of Reason and Squalor II	Painted Bronze	Gallery I		
2004						
2005						
2006	Chantal Joffe	Blond Girl - Black Dress	Oil on board	Gallery III		
2007	Gavin Turk	Dumb Candle	Wood	Gallery I		
2008	Jeff Koons	Cracked Egg (Blue) 1994-2006	High chromium stainless steel with transparent colour coating	Central Hall		
2009	Richard Wilson					
2010	Yinka Shonibare	Crash Willy	Mannequin, Dutch wax printed cotton textile, leather, fibreglass and metal	Wohl Central Hall		
2011	Alison Wilding	Take a Deep Breath…	Painted foam, copper and fibreglass resin	Lecture Room		
2012	Anselm Kiefer	Samson	Oil, acrylic, steel, pastel and charcoal	Large Weston Room		
2013	El Anatsui	TSIATSIA – searching for connection	Aluminium (bottle tops, printing plates, roofing sheets) and copper wire	Courtyard (facade of the RA)		
2014	Wolfgang Tillmans	Greifbar 1	Inkjet print	Gallery IX		
2015	Rose Wylie	Herr Rehlinger In White Armour	Oil on canvas	Gallery III		
2016	David Nash	Big Black	Charred redwood	Gallery IV		
2017	Isaac Julien	Western Union: Small Boats	Five screen projection	Gallery X		
2018	Mike Nelson	Untitled (Public sculpture for a redundant space)	Sleeping bag, concrete and rubble	The Annenberg Courtyard & Staircase	Royal Academy	
2019	Joe Tilson	Finestra Venezia	Thirty-six Murano glass works for the Grande Albergo Ausonia and Hungaria	Gallery II		
2020						
2021	Naomi Gakunga	Wetereire – Waiting	Stainless steel wire, sheet metal and paper	Lecture Room		
2022	Uta Kögelsberger	Cull	Video	Small Weston Room		
2023	Kara Walker	The Omicron Variations	Ink on paper	Gallery III		
2024	Tracey Emin	Did it Ever Get Any Better	Acrylic on canvas	Gallery III		
2025	Sikelela Owen	KNITTING	Oil	Gallery VIII		

== Reception ==
The exhibition has received both admiration and criticism. Jonathan Jones described it in 2019 as the "bloated corpse of a tradition ... [with] a tired, inward looking, end-of-the-road quality".

An exhibition about the history of the Summer Exhibition, The Great Spectacle, was held in 2018.
