= Kuboraum =

Brand of eyewear

- Company type: GmbH
- Founded: 2012
- Founder: Livio Graziottin, Sergio Eusebi
- Headquarters: Berlin, Germany
- Products: Eyewear
- Website: kuboraum.com

Kuboraum (German: "cubic room") is a brand of Italian-made sunglasses and eyeglasses. Kuboraum was founded in Berlin in 2012 by Italian designer Livio Graziottin, and anthropologist Sergio Eusebi. The brand refers to its eyewear as "masks".

== History ==
The founders first met in Berlin in 2009 during a vernissage in an art gallery of a mutual friend.

The Kuboraum project started in February 2012. It applied the Italian artisanal tradition in a Berlin-based creative environment. Hence the company's slogan, "dreamed in Berlin, handmade in Italy".

The brand was founded in the rooms of a former post office on the border between east and west Berlin. The space that was originally converted into a gallery, immediately which became the incubator for the creation of new projects. After various metamorphoses, today this place includes the studio, showroom and the Kuboraum flagship store, from design to brand identity, from images to communication, from photo to video productions, from installations to interior design projects
