= Trafalgar Studios, Chelsea =

Artists' studios in Chelsea, London

Coordinates: 51°29′17″N 0°10′20″W

Trafalgar Studios were a set of purpose-built artists' studios on Manresa Road in the Chelsea area of London, England, just off the King's Road. A number or notable artists worked there.

The three-story, 15-unit block was built in 1878 by John Brass.

They were the first such studios in London, but further blocks were built nearby, attempting to emulate their success.

== Studios ==
Among the artists to work at the numbered studios were:

=== 2 ===
- James Havard Thomas

=== 4 ===
- c. 1933 – 1937 Clifford Hall

=== 7 ===
- 1886 – Henry Jamyn Brooks

=== 8 ===
- c. 1937 – 1952 Clifford Hall

=== 10 ===
- c. 1901 – 1916 Adelaide Louisa Haslegrave

=== 11 ===
- Edward Onslow Ford
- c. 1888 – 1892 John Wilson
- c. 1891 – 1892 George William Iliffe Wilson
- c. 1885 – 1901 Albert Arthur Toft (occupied studios with his brother Alfonso; also 12)

=== 12 ===
- 1900 – Albert Toft (see above)
- Circa 1927 – Arnrid Banniza Johnston
- 1944 – Harry Thomas
- c. 1950 – 1951 Richard Alfred Thomas

=== 13 ===
- Herbert Granville Fell (also no 14)
- Edward Gordon Craig (also no 14)

=== 14 ===
- 1881–1898 – Rudolph Onslow Ford
- 1911 – Aroldo du-Chêne de Vére
- Circa 1939 Frank Owen Dobson
- Frank Brangwyn
- Edward Gordon Craig (also no 13)

=== 15 ===
- 1881 – James Havard Thomas
- 1927 Alfred Priest
- c. 1933 – 1936 – Frank Owen Dobson

=== 16 ===
- Circa 1890 – George Wilson

=== Unspecified ===
- Mervyn Peake
- Evelyn De Morgan, 1880s
