= October Gallery =

Art gallery in central London, England

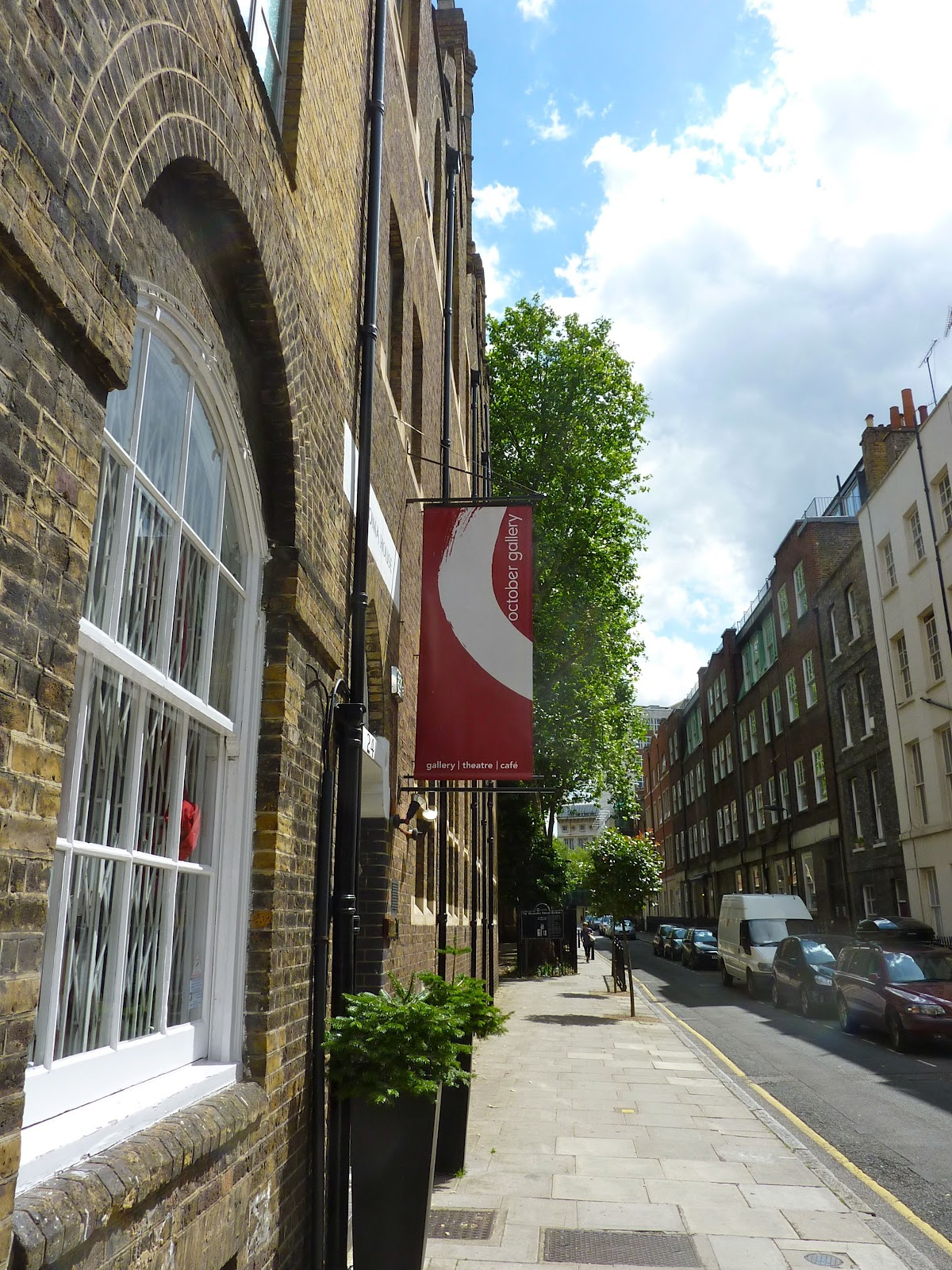

- Location within Central London
- Established: 1979; 47 years ago
- Location: 24 Old Gloucester Street, Bloomsbury, London, WC1
- Coordinates: 51.520654°N 0.121843°W
- Director: Chili Hawes
- Public transit access: Holborn
- Website: octobergallery.co.uk

October Gallery is an art gallery in central London, England, established in 1979. It is notable for promoting the work of artists of the "Transvangarde" or trans-cultural avant-garde movement. The gallery also hosts talks, performances and seminars.

Among notable contemporary international artists whose work has been shown at October Gallery are Aubrey Williams, El Anatsui, James Barnor, Sokari Douglas Camp, Eddy Kamuanga Ilunga, Naomi Gakunga, Ablade Glover, Owusu-Ankomah, Romuald Hazoumè, and Rachid Koraïchi.

== History ==
Established in 1979, October Gallery has promoted the art and artists of the "Transvangarde" – "a concept based on the idea that the true cutting edge is the coming together of the cross-cultural avant-garde"— giving a platform to international artists and experimental literature, including artwork by such significant literary figures as William Burroughs, J. G. Ballard and Lawrence Durrell. The gallery has exhibited the work of artists from more than 65 different countries, and from regions including Africa, Asia, Australia, the Americas, Europe, the Middle East, India and Oceania.

October Gallery shows have featured work by such notable international artists as Aubrey Williams, El Anatsui, James Barnor, Sokari Douglas Camp, Eddy Kamuanga Ilunga, Naomi Gakunga, Ablade Glover, Owusu-Ankomah, Romuald Hazoumè, and Rachid Koraïchi.

The co-founder and director of October Gallery is Chili Hawes and the artistic director is Elisabeth Lalouschek.

The gallery marked its 40th anniversary with the publication in 2020 of the book Dream No Small Dream: The Story of October Gallery, which included essays by Chili Hawes, Elisabeth Lalouschek, Niru Ratnam, Dr Chris Spring, Dr Gus Casely-Hayford, Dr Mark Nelson, John Allen, Ian MacFadyen, Professor Paul Goodwin, with photography and design by Jonathan Greet.
