= Eddy Kamuanga Ilunga =

Painter from the Democratic Republic of the Congo (born 1991)

- Born: 1991 (age 34–35); Kinshasa, Democratic Republic of the Congo
- Occupation: Contemporary painter

Eddy Kamuanga Ilunga (born 1991) is a contemporary painter from the Democratic Republic of the Congo whose Afrofuturism works have been exhibited across Africa and in Europe and the United States.

== Life ==
Kamuanga Ilunga was born in Kinshasa, Democratic Republic of the Congo, as the second of seven kids, including five sisters. His father had studied political science and was a teacher at a Salvation Army university while his mother sold second-hand shoes at a market. His mother was the family's primary financial support.

While growing up, Kamuanga Ilunga focused on technologies such as television, radio, the internet and video games. However, he was also surrounded by the fabrics, jewelry, and fashion accessories of his sisters. When he later became an artist all of these elements found their way into his paintings.

When Kamuanga Ilunga was six years old, he saw people painting at a studio in front of his school. He started recreating comics, posters, and music album covers. By the time he was ten to twelve years old he was receiving commissions from small advertising companies and shops.

He currently divides his time between living in Kinshasa, where he has a studio, and Brussels, Belgium.

== Career ==
Kamuanga Ilunga studied at the Académie des Beaux-Arts in Kinshasa, but became disillusioned and left the school after a short time to help form the M’Pongo art group. His singular style of displaying painted humans with computer circuitry originated when he was 20 and broke his mobile phone. "Looking in my iPhone," he said, "I became fascinated. I found out that these circuit boards are made of minerals found in Congo." He was also shocked that many villages in the Congo are destroyed for the minerals used to create electronics in use across the planet.

His paintings have exhibited in Africa, Europe and the United States of America, including at the Fowler Museum at UCLA, the Birmingham Museum and Art Gallery, and the Royal Academy of Arts in London (with one of his paintings being the last exhibition's symbolic image). His first London appearance was in 2015, during the Saatchi Gallery's Pangaea II show and the 1-54 contemporary African art fair. In 2016, his work was featured in a solo show at the October Gallery and in New York's Armory Show art fair. In 2017 his painting "Elongated Head" sold for £11,250 and in 2018 "Mangbetu" sold at Sotheby's for £65,000.

Among Ilunga's influences is the Congolese modernist artist Kamba Luesa. He was also mentored by Vitshois Mwilambwe Bondo.

== Style and technique ==
Kamuanga Ilunga's Afrofuturism paintings depict the clash of culture and technology and are created in acrylic and oil on canvas from posed photographs of live models. One major focus of his work is the coltan industry in his home country and "the contrast between the rare metallic ore's role as a vital component in the infrastructure of our digital age and the legions of underpaid workers who dig it out of the earth by hand." The figures in his paintings allude to European portraiture, dystopian science fiction and traditional Congolese sculpture and textiles, allowing him to "tattoo the badges of contemporary technology into the skin of those who procure these materials for others' profit." The cotton people in his paintings wear alludes to plantations and textile mills created when Congo was a Belgian colony in the 1920s and 1930s, along with today's sweatshop labor and globalization.

According to Apollo: The International Magazine of Art, Kamuanga Ilunga's paintings reflect "the creative energy and contradictions of life in contemporary Kinshasa. Striking classical poses and draped in sumptuously rendered fabrics, the figures in his paintings are frequently depicted alongside ritual objects that have fallen out of use, while their skin is adorned with patterns reminiscent of computer chips – a reference to coltan, the raw material exported in vast quantities from the DRC for use in modern technologies worldwide."

New African described his work as futuristic and seeming to "positively embrace technology, while also seeking to encompass its traditional roots." As Kamuanga Ilunga has said of his paintings, "Understanding the present through the past is central to my work."

== Monographs ==
- Eddy Kamuanga Ilunga by Sammy Baloji, Sandrine Colard, Gerard Houghton, and Gabriela Salgado, foreword by Gus Casely-Hayford, Rizzoli, October 2022.
