= Private view =

Invitation-only viewing of an exhibition

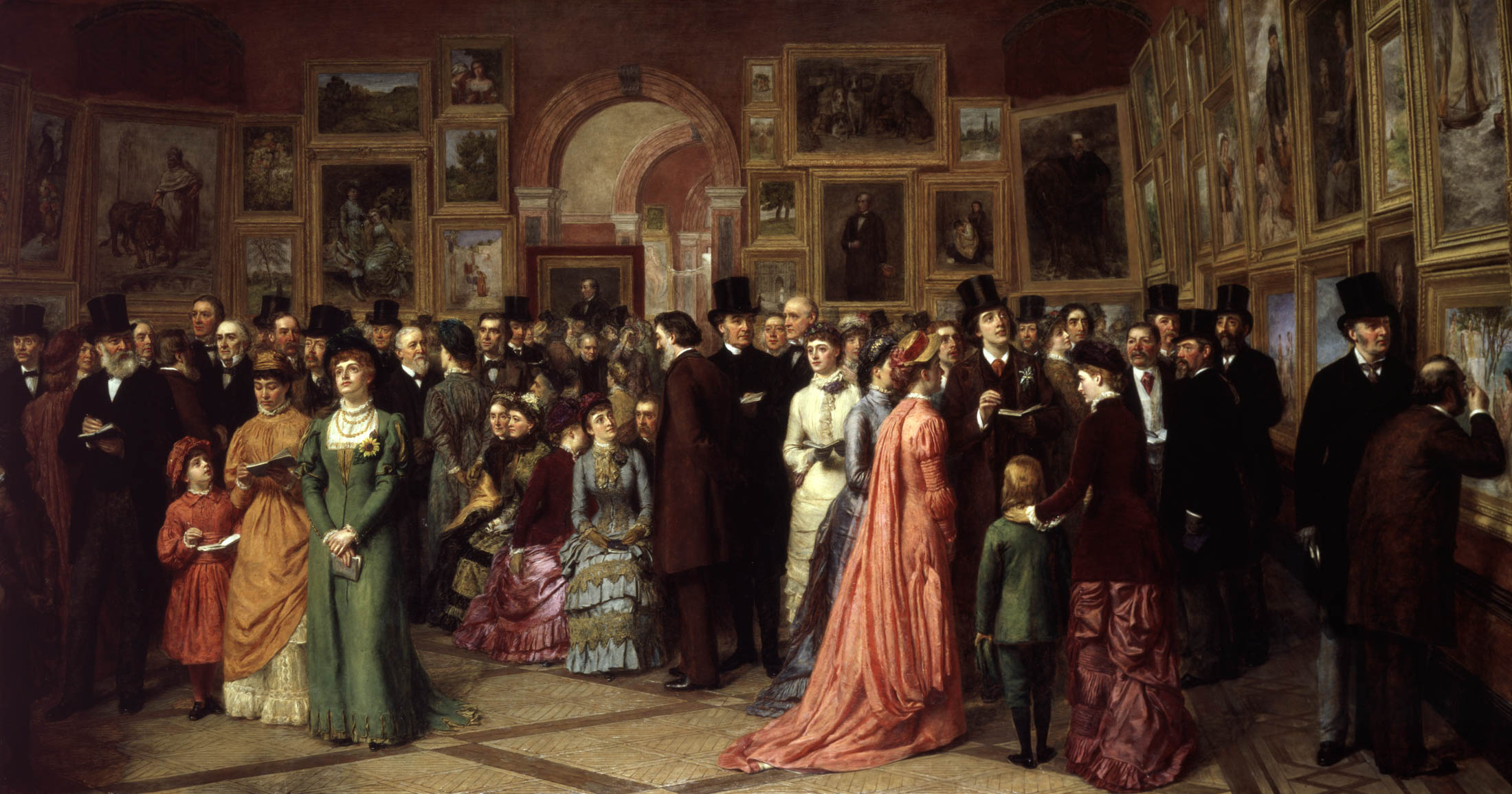
A Private View at the Royal Academy, 1881 by William Powell Frith (1883)

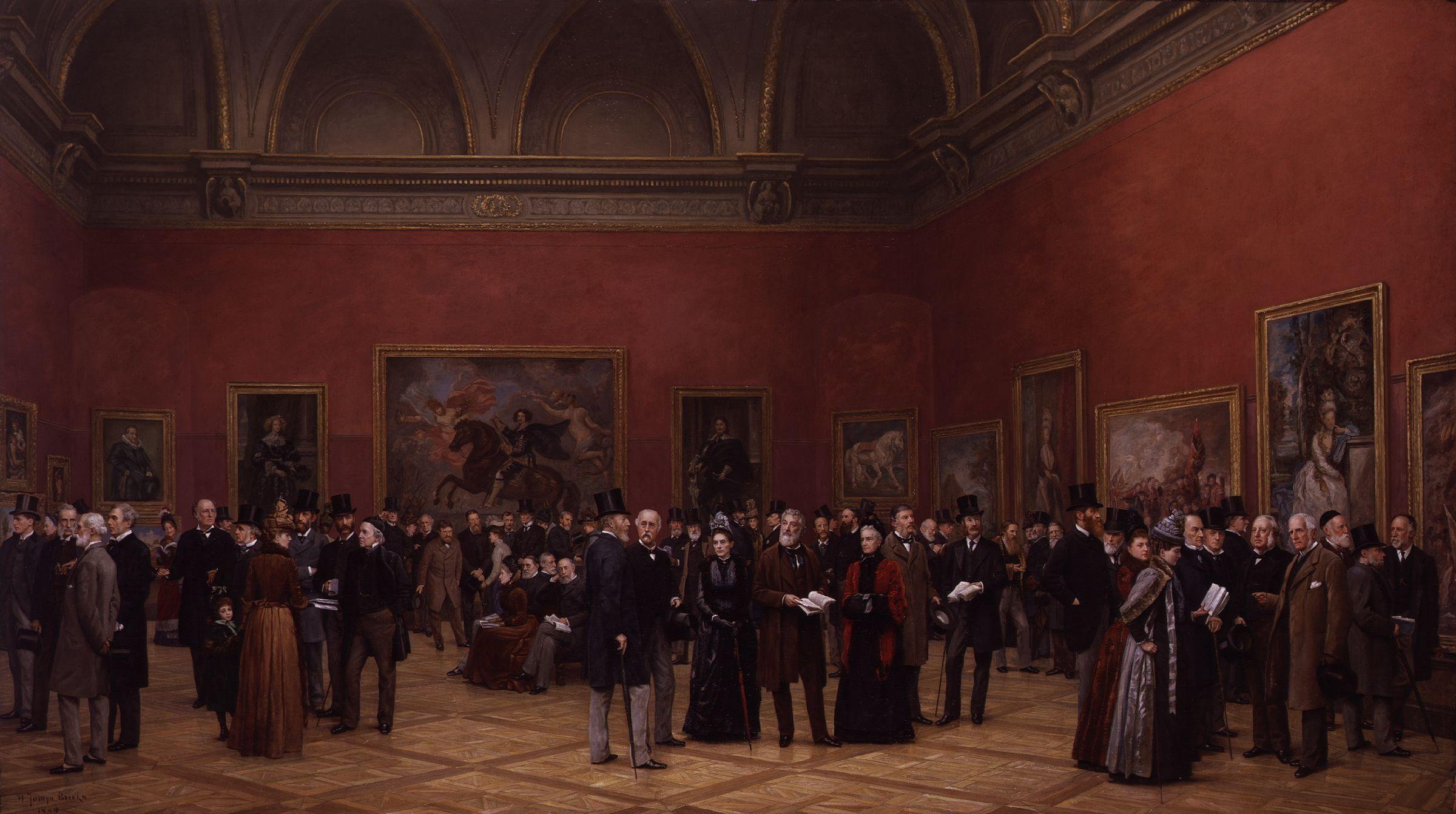
Private View of the Old Masters Exhibition, Royal Academy, 1888 by Henry Jamyn Brooks (1889)

A private view is a special viewing of an exhibition by invitation only, often an art exhibition and normally a preview at the start of a public exhibition. In the United Kingdom, a private view is generally open to all visitors. Typically wine and light refreshments are served in the form of a reception. If the works on show are by a living artist, it is normal for them to attend the private view. Artworks on view are typically for sale.

This type of exhibition set in a private setting is commonly referred to as the vernissage.
