= George Afedzi Hughes =

Ghanaian-born American artist and poet

George Afedzi Hughes, is a Ghanaian-born American artist specializing in painting, poetry, and performance art.

== Early life and education ==
George Afedzi Hughes was born on 23 December 1962, in Sekondi-Takoradi, Ghana, to George Hughes, a journalist and public relations officer for the Takoradi City Council, and Cecilia Hughes, a petty trader. Hughes went to high school at Ghana National College, then studied painting at The Kwame Nkrumah University of Science and Technology, College of Art (1985–1991), earning a BA degree in Painting and Drawing in 1989 and an MA in Art Education in 1992.

Hughes lived in London, England, from 1991 to 1993 and relocated to the United States in 1994, receiving his MFA in Painting from Bowling Green State University in Bowling Green, Ohio, in 2001.

Chroma 29 (2024, dimensions vary, mixed media on wood) from Hughes' series "Puzzle Pieces: Collisions and Chroma"

== Work ==
Hughes' paintings and performance artworks have been exhibited internationally across Europe, Africa, Asia, and America. His work references the violence and tragedy of colonialism juxtaposed with contemporary global conflicts.

Common motifs in his paintings include recontextualized language, commonly seen signs and symbols, nods to pop culture, and references to Hughes' cultural background.

Hughes' "Bulgey with Boombox" (2022, acrylic and oil on canvas)

His performance artworks are interdisciplinary, combining ritual, metaphor, poetry, sound effects, video, and allegorical configurations.

Still image from Hughes' performance piece "Sum-Phusis" (2007)

Current and ongoing projects include Hughes' series of painted assemblages, "Puzzle Pieces" and his series of video interviews with other artists, "Focus".

He is represented by the Skoto Gallery in New York City, NY, Artco Kunstagentur GmbH, in Herzogenrath, Germany, and Artists Alliance Gallery, in Accra, Ghana.

The Burchfield Penney Art Center, the Royal Ontario Museum, the Harn Museum of Art, the National Museum of Ghana, and Iwalewahaus have collected Hughes' work.

== Career ==
Hughes' first teaching position was teaching English Literature at Sekondi College in Sekondi, Ghana from 1982 to 1984 as part of his national service to Ghana. Afterwards, he taught art at St. John's School, Sekondi from 1984 to 1985. From 1997 to 2000, Hughes taught Drawing as an adjunct instructor at the University of Toledo. Hughes then worked as an Assistant Professor of Painting for the School of Art at the University of Oklahoma in Norman, OK, from 2001 to 2006. He currently resides in Buffalo, NY, where he works for the Art Department at the State University of New York at Buffalo as the Director of Undergraduate Studies, Program Head of Painting, and Associate Professor.

Hughes has been an Artist-in-residence at several schools, art centers, and museums in the United States, Canada, the United Kingdom, and Europe. These include the Örebro Art College at Örebro University in Sweden, the Musée d'art contemporain de Montréal (MACM) in Quebec, and the Queen's University Belfast in Northern Ireland.

== Press ==
- "Soccer meets colonialism in George Afedzi Hughes' paintings at BAS", ArtCo Gallery.
- https://corneliamagazine.com/article-set/George-Hughes
- https://www.fredonia.edu/news/articles/exhibition-features-works-13-western-new-york-artists
- https://buffalonews.com/multimedia/photos-in-these-truths-exhibition-preview-at-albright-knox-northland/collection_6e8972b4-9107-11ec-9fce-87ccf28bdcb2.html#tracking-source=in-article
- https://www.wgrz.com/article/entertainment/in-these-truths-exhibit-opens-at-albright-knox-northland-buffalo/71-ddf168aa-845e-430e-93a5-8e43da43b0d7
- https://www.albrightknox.org/art/exhibitions/these-truths
- https://www.observertoday.com/life/entertainment/2022/02/exhibition-features-works-of-13-western-new-york-artists/
- Brienne Walsh, "Cecily Brown Enlivens A High School In Buffalo With A Mural Painted In Collaboration With Local Artists", Forbes, 6 August 2021
- https://www.bloomberg.com/news/features/2021-08-12/the-murals-of-buffalo-s-street-art-renaissance
- "Skoto Gallery: The Dynamics of Success", The Art Momentum, 14 November 2021
- http://www.cahiersdufootball.net/article-la-revue-des-cahiers-numero-5-7426
- https://theculturetrip.com/north-america/usa/florida/articles/celebrate-the-fifa-world-cup-at-perez-art-museum-miami/
- https://skotogallery.com/george-afedzi-hughes-moments-in-time-tangents/
- https://www.apollo-magazine.com/art-diary/the-worlds-game-futbol-and-contemporary-art/
- https://observer.com/2018/04/perez-art-museum-miami-the-worlds-game-attracts-world-cup-fans/
- https://www.buffalospree.com/arts_entertainment/on_view/george-afedzi-hughes-at-bas/article_46745c80-8611-11ed-bd03-5f737ab7f872.html
- https://cargocollective.com/artfilemagazine/filter/georgeafedzihughes/George-Afedzi-Hughes
- https://www.buffalorising.com/2018/02/george-hughes-the-politics-of-identity-at-buffalo-arts-studio/
- https://www.muhlenberg.edu/gallery/pastexhibitions/georgeafedzihughes/
- https://www.lacma.org/art/exhibition/futbol-beautiful-game
- https://www.nytimes.com/2010/03/26/arts/design/26art.html
- "George Afedzi Hughes: Collisions", Skoto Gallery
- Lehigh Valley's NPR, "Urban Illusions" interview https://www.youtube.com/watch?v=Dg_wnOf2cwg&t=640s
- "Hallwalls Interview: George Afedzi Hughes 2006", 14 September 2019.
- "Fowler Museum Interview of George Afedzi Hughes by Doran Ross(2001)", YouTube, 23 December 2019.
- https://www.buffalospree.com/local-events/?_evDiscoveryPath=/event/2527796-aitina-fareed-cooke-and-get-fokus-d-productions-tales-from-the-porch-part-iv-art-is-a-language-
- https://www.syracuse.com/living/2021/06/made-in-ny-art-show-in-auburn-displays-the-best-of-upstate-ny-through-aug-7.html
- https://www.africanews.com/2016/03/23/african-art-stands-out-at-dubai-art-fair/
- https://www.artweek.com/events/united-states/art-exhibition/new-york/rebel-exhibition-group-show-presented-untitled-space#
- https://www.artpublikamag.com/post/event-spotlight-the-rebel-art-show-at-the-untitled-space-features-works-by-30-international-artists
- https://artdaily.cc/news/66439/Exhibition-of-recent-paintings-by-the-Ghanaian-born-artist-George-Afedzi-Hughes-opens-at-Skoto-Gallery

== Bibliography ==
- Obiago, Sandra Mbanefo, "A King's Passion: A 21st-Century Patron of African Artists" (2024). 5-Continents Editions. ISBN 9791254600498
- Prah, Elizabeth, and Akoi-Jackson, Bernard, "New Perspectives: Contemporary Art from Ghana" (2024). Nuvo Publishing. ISBN 9781399979764
- Olivia von Gries and Robert Bailey, "Archival Assembly: The Black Artists of Oklahoma Project and Art-Historical Infrastructure", Panorama: Journal of the Association of Historians of American Art 9, no. 1 (Spring 2023), p. 3
- Sofo, Elijah, African Arts, Volume 56 (4).(2023), p. 42–61. University of California, Los Angeles (ISSN 0001-9933)
- Dima, Vlad, "The Beautiful Skin: Football, Fantasy, and Cinematic Bodies in Africa" (2020). Michigan State University Press. eBook. ISBN 9781628954050
- Haxall, Daniel, "Picturing the Beautiful Game: A History of Soccer in Visual Culture and Art" (2018). Bloomsbury Publishing. ISBN 9781501334580
- Cooksey, Susan, African Arts, Volume 51 (3).(2018), p. 9. University of California, Los Angeles (ISSN 0001-9933)
- Forni, Silvia. 2018. "Of Patterns and Markets: The Making and Unmaking of Asafo Flags." Critical Interventions 12 (1): 22–35.
- Hovey, Werntz, and White, "Sports and Violence: History, Theory, and Practice" (2017), pp. 18–19. Cambridge Scholars Publishing. ISBN 9781443816878
- Doran, Ross, and Forni, Silvia, Art, Honor, and Ridicule: Asafo Flags from Southern Ghana (2016). pp. 22–35. Royal Ontario Museum. ISBN 9780888545169
- Savage, Polly, "Making Art in Africa: 1960-2010" (2014). Lund Humphries. ISBN 9781848221512
- Kwami, Atta, "Kumasi Realism, 1951–2007: An African Realism" (2013). Hurst. ISBN 9781849040877
- Helmut Anheier, Yudhishthir Raj Isar, "Cultural Expression, Creativity & Innovation" (2010), pp. 62–77. Sage Publications Ltd. ISBN 9781412920865
- Jegede, Dele, Encyclopedia of African American Artists (2009), pp. 109–112. Bloomsbury Publishing USA. ISBN 9780313080609
- Razdow, Max. "S&M Live!", ArtUS, no. 26, Spring 2009, p. 55. Gale Academic OneFile.
- Svasek Maruska (2007). Anthropology, Art and Cultural Production, pp. 116–122. London: Pluto Press. ISBN 9780745317946
- Doran Ross (2001). African Arts, Volume 34, pp. 50–57. University of California, Los Angeles (ISSN 0001-9933)
- Kaiser, Franz, "Museum Paper" (9/29/01), p. 2
- Underwood, J. L. (2018). "Review of Art, Honor, and Ridicule: Asafo Flags from Southern Ghana, by S. Forni". African Arts, 51(2), 89–92. https://www.jstor.org/stable/48547471
