= Stephen Phillips =

English poet and dramatist

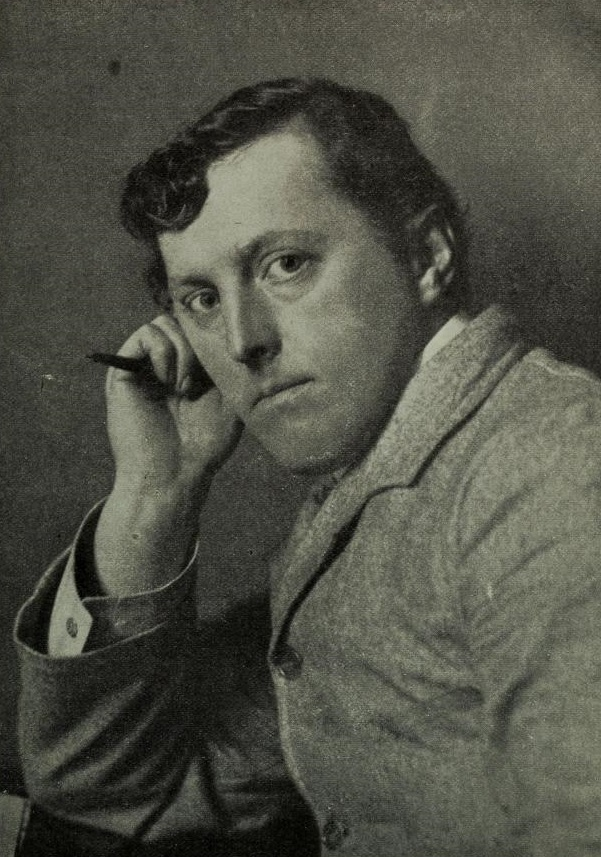
Stephen Phillips.

Stephen Phillips (28 July 1864 – 9 December 1915) was an English poet and dramatist, who enjoyed considerable popularity early in his career.

== Biography ==
He was born at Summertown near Oxford, the son of the Rev. Stephen Phillips, precentor of Peterborough Cathedral. He was educated at Stratford and Peterborough Grammar Schools, and considered entering Queens' College, Cambridge on a minor scholarship to study classics; but he instead went to a London crammer to prepare for the civil service. In 1885, however, he moved to Wolverhampton to join his cousin F. R. Benson's dramatic company, and for six years he played various small parts.

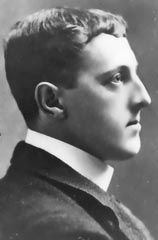
Stephen Phillips

In 1890 a slender volume of verse was published at Oxford with the title Primavera, which contained contributions by him and by his cousin Laurence Binyon and others. In 1894 he published Eremus, a long poem of loose structure in blank verse of a philosophical complexion. In 1896 appeared Christ in Hades, forming with a few other short pieces one of the slim paper-covered volumes of Elkin Mathews's Shilling Garland. This poem caught the eye of the critics, and when it was followed by a collection of Poems in 1897 the writer's position as a new poet of exceptional gifts was generally recognized. This volume contained a new edition of Christ in Hades, together with Marpessa, The Woman with the Dead Soul, The Wife and shorter pieces, including To Milton, Blind. The volume won the prize of £100 offered by the Academy newspaper for the best new book of its year, ran through half a dozen editions in two years, and established Phillips's rank as poet, which was sustained by the publication, in the Nineteenth Century in 1898 of his poem Endymion.

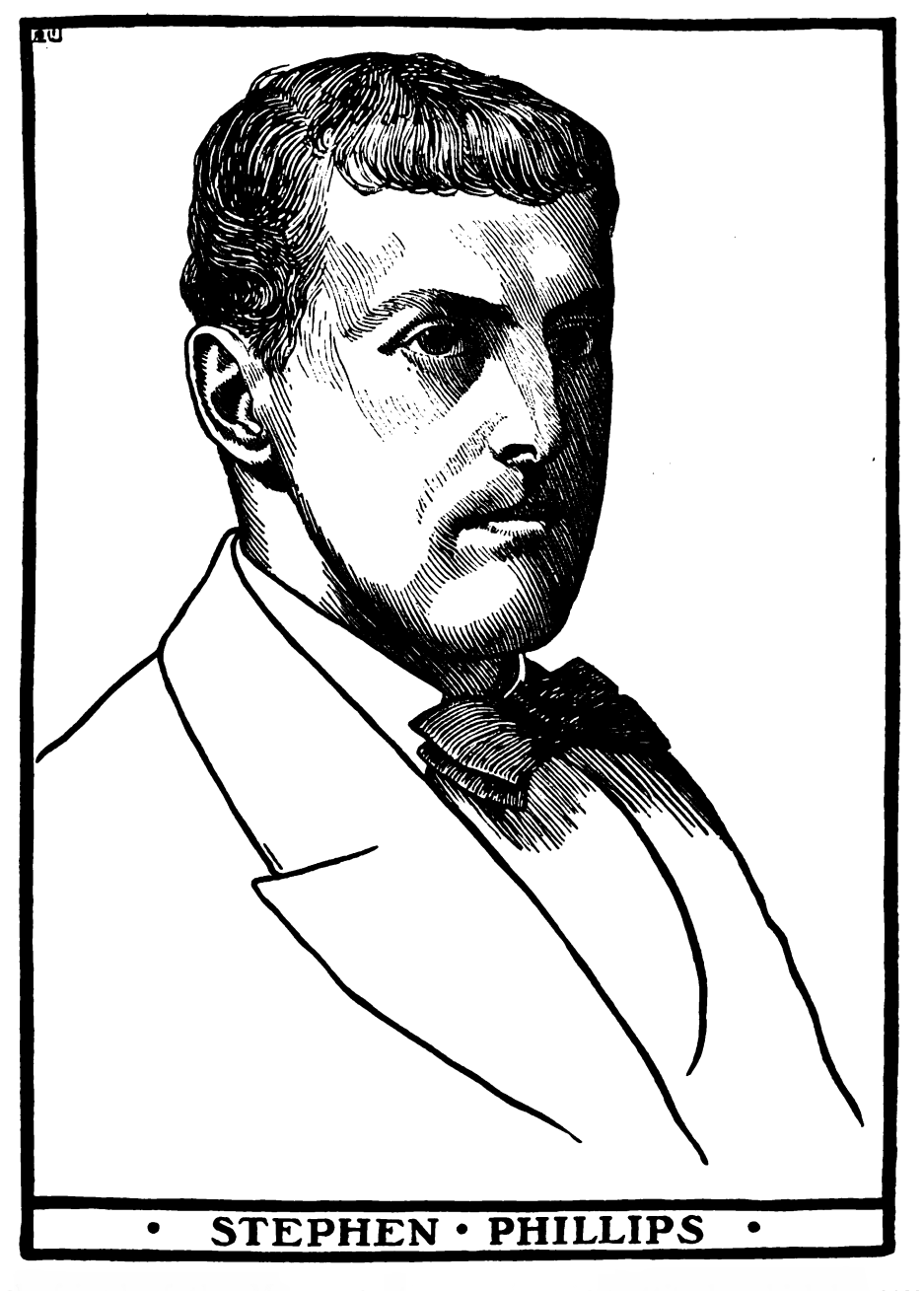
Stephen Phillips

Sir George Alexander, the actor-manager, moved perhaps by a certain clamour among the critics for a literary drama, then commissioned Phillips to write him a play, the result being Paolo and Francesca (1900), a drama founded on Dante's famous episode from Inferno. Encouraged by the great success of the drama in its literary form, Mr Alexander produced the piece at the St. James' Theatre in 1902. In the meantime, Phillips's next play, Herod: a Tragedy, had been produced by Beerbohm Tree on 31 October 1900, and was published as a book in 1901; Ulysses, also produced by Beerbohm Tree, was published in 1902; The Sin of David, a drama on the story of David and Bathsheba, translated into the times and terms of Cromwellian England, was published in 1904; and Nero, produced by Beerbohm Tree, was published in 1906. In these plays the poet's avowed aim was, instead of attempting to revive the method of Shakespeare and the Elizabethans, to revitalize the method of Greek drama. Paolo and Francesca (which admitted certainly one scene on an Elizabethan model) was the most successful.

When a theatrical production of Ulysses was staged at Her Majesty's Theatre, London, in 1902 the opening night was attended by the Royal Family, nobility, politicians, and many other members of high society. The 29 January 1902 issue of The Tatler reported that the artist Henry Jamyn Brooks was working on a 9 by 6 feet (2.7 m × 1.8 m) picture of the attendees, which was to include some 300 portraits.

For his earlier career, see the section on Stephen Phillips in Poets of the Younger Generation, by William Archer (1902); also the articles on 'Tragedy and Mr Stephen Phillips', by William Watson in the Fortnightly Review (March 1898); 'The Poetry of Mr Stephen Phillips', in the Edinburgh Review (January 1900); 'Mr Stephen Phillips', in The Century (January 1901), by Edmund Gosse; and 'Mr Stephen Phillips', in the Quarterly Review (April 1902), by Arthur Symons.

While enjoying success in the theatre Phillips continued to write and publish poetry. In 1908 he brought out New Poems, and then in 1911 his longest poem, The New Inferno (1911). This was followed by Lyrics and Dramas (1913) and Panama and other Poems (1915). From January 1913 until his death he was editor of The Poetry Review.

Shortly before his death Phillips completed Harold, a verse play about the Norman conquest. In October 1915 he fell ill after suffering a severe chill. He died in Deal in Kent, on 9 December 1915, of cirrhosis of the liver and exhaustion. He was buried in the cemetery at Hastings on 13 December 1915.

== Sources ==
- Mason, A. E. W. (1935). Sir George Alexander & The St. James' Theatre. Reissued 1969, New York: Benjamin Blom.
- Whittington-Egan, Richard (2006). Stephen Phillips: A Biography. Rivendale Press. ISBN 1-904201-01-6.
- Wearing, J. P. "Phillips, Stephen (1864–1915)". Oxford Dictionary of National Biography (online ed.). Oxford University Press. doi:10.1093/ref:odnb/35514. (Subscription, Wikipedia Library access or UK public library membership required.)
