= Chelsea Square =

Garden square in London, England

Coordinates: 51.4888°N 0.1731°W

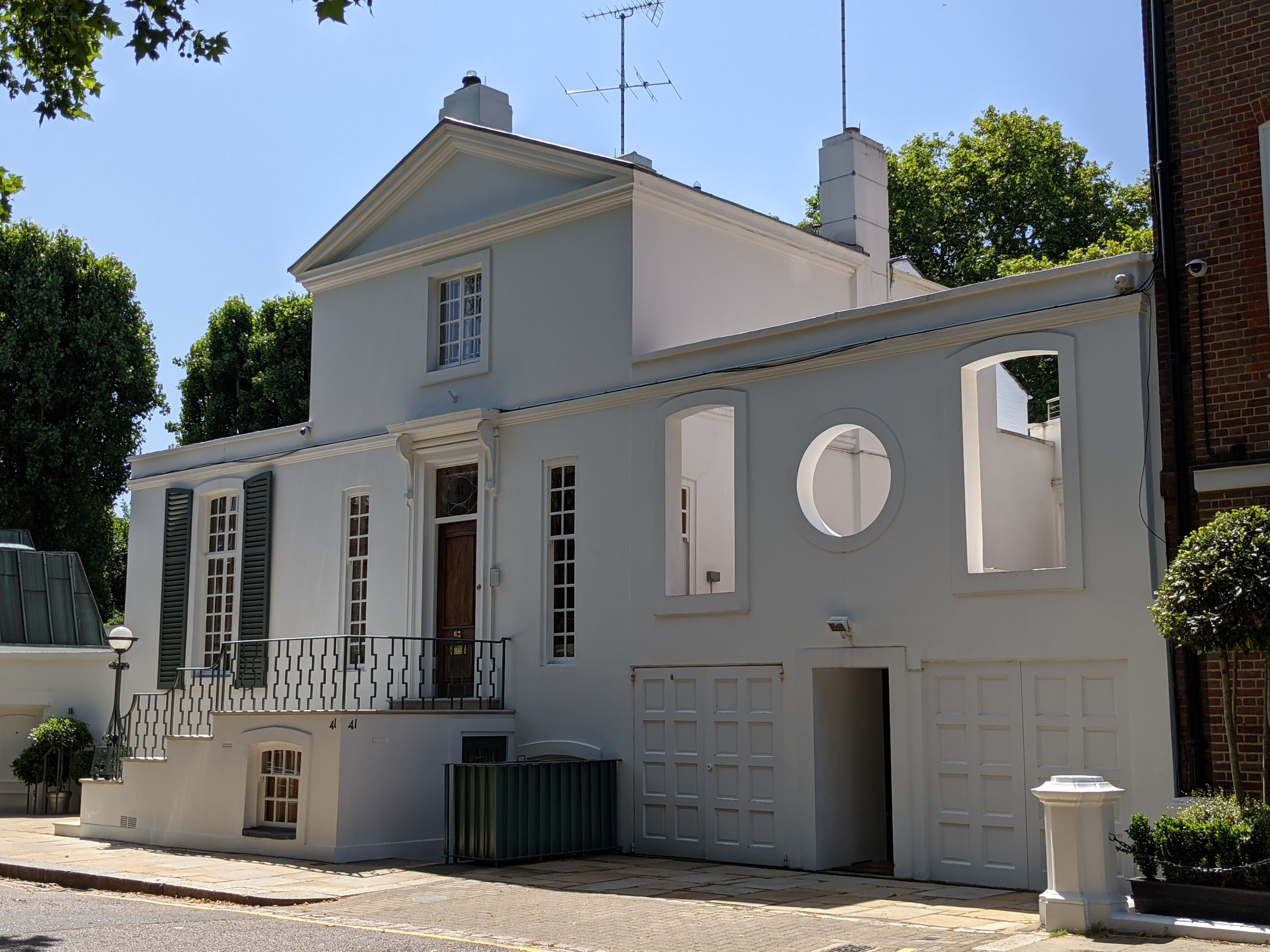
41, Chelsea Square in 2021

Chelsea Square is a garden square in Chelsea, London.

It lies in the area between King's Road and Fulham Road, between Old Church Street and Dovehouse Street, with Manresa Road off the south side, and South Parade running along its north side.

In December 2021, it was named the fourth most expensive street in the UK, with an average house price of £18.8 million.

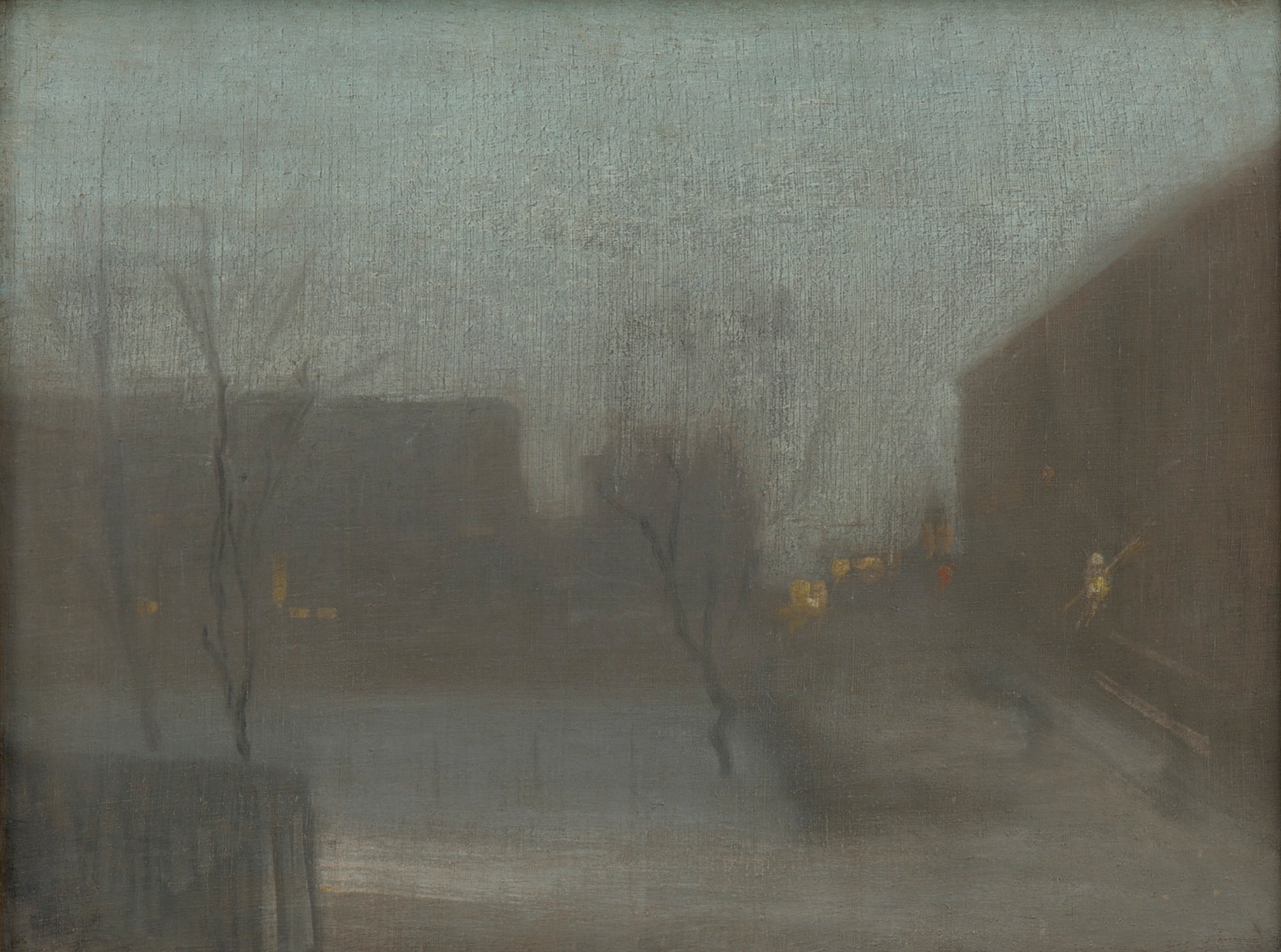
Whistler James Nocturne Trafalgar Square Chelsea Snow 1876

An 1876 painting by James McNeill Whistler depicts the square under its original name of Trafalgar Square. The square was redeveloped and renamed in 1928.
