= Artists Alliance Gallery (Omanye House) =

Art centre in Labadi, Ghana

Artists Alliance Gallery, also known as Omanye House, is an art centre in Ghana that exhibits the works of artists.

== Background ==
The centre was established by Ablade Glover. It is located at Labadi, in the Greater Accra Region.
