= Henry Jamyn Brooks =

English painter

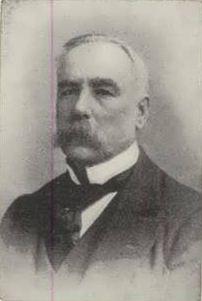
- Jamyn Brooks in The Tatler, 1902
- Born: 1839; England
- Died: 1925 (aged 85–86); Essex, England
- Occupations: Painter; Photographer

Henry Jamyn Brooks (1839–1925) was a British painter, particularly known for his pictures of meetings and events, in which many individuals are personally identifiable. He painted royalty, and portraits of civic leaders and military people, and was also a photographer.

== Personal life ==
Brooks was born in 1839. (Note: Many sources wrongly report his date of birth as 1865, but The National Portrait Gallery confirm the earlier date. Note also his son was born in 1874.)

His son, Sidney Malcolm Wellbye Brooks (born 1874, Abingdon), was a member of the Anglican missionary organisation, the Society for the Propagation of the Gospel in Foreign Parts and was reported murdered in China, during the Boxer Rebellion, on 30 December 1899.

Brooks died in Essex in 1925.

== Career ==
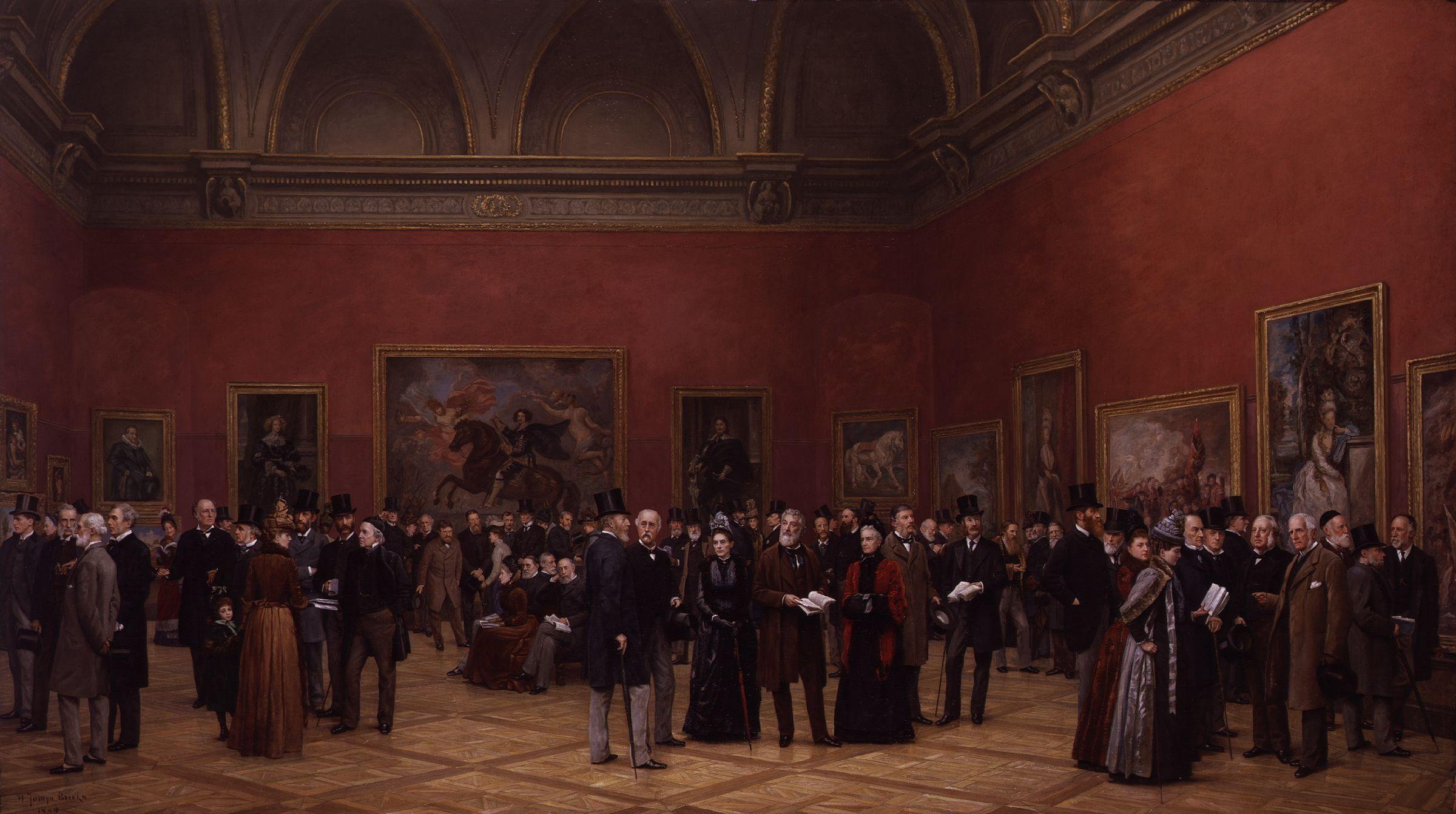
Private View of the Old Masters Exhibition, Royal Academy, 1888, 1889

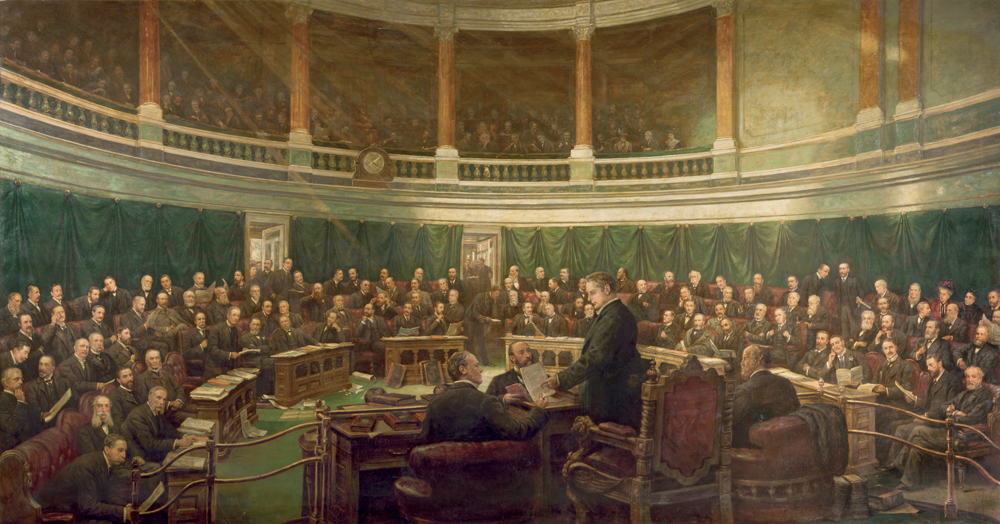
The First Meeting of the London County Council in the County Hall Spring Gardens, 1889, oil on canvas, 194 x 368 cm, City of London Corporation collection

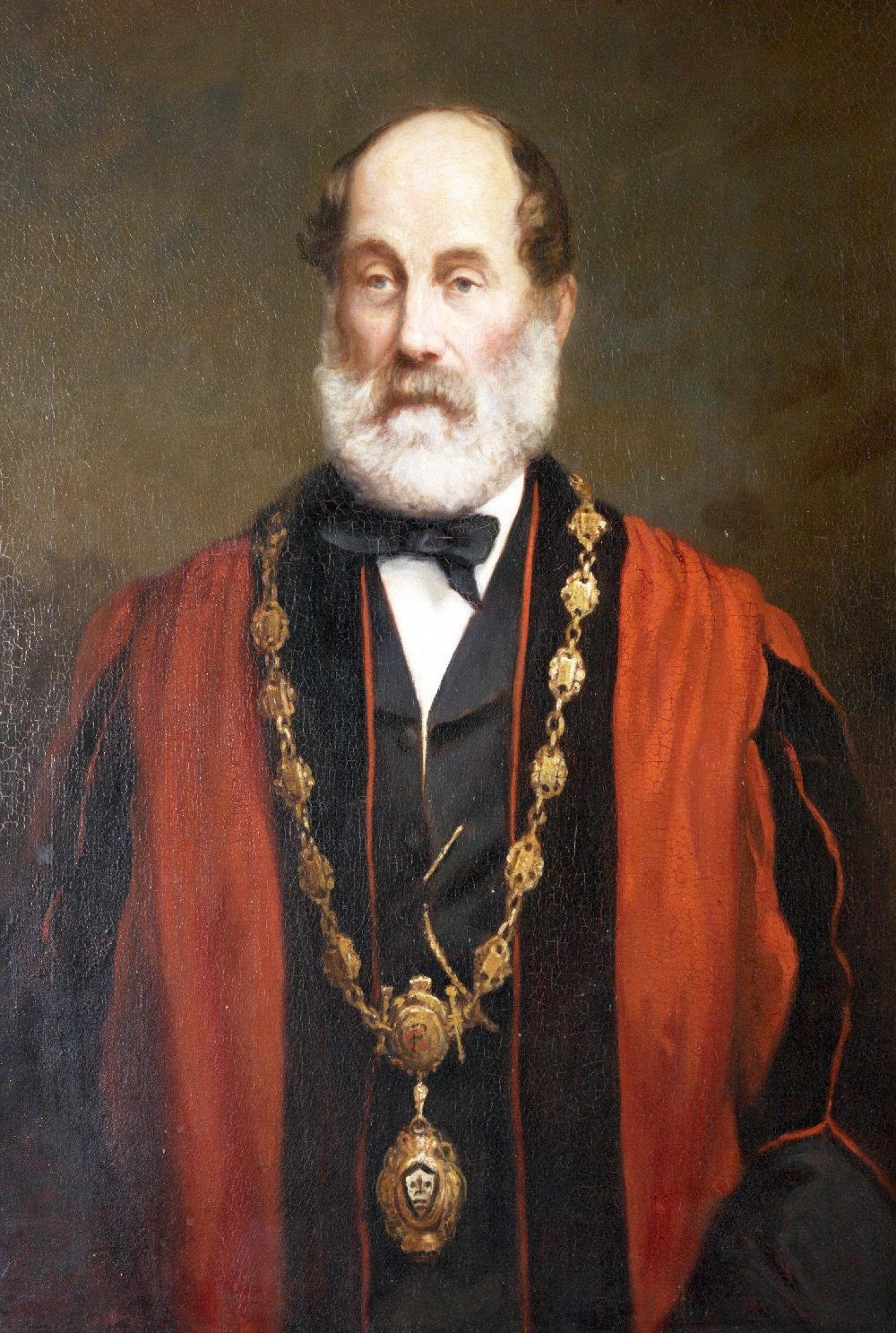
Alderman Nathaniel Chapple, Mayor of Torrington (1871, 1879 & 1889), oil on canvas, 90.4 x 69.4 cm, Great Torrington Almshouse, Town Lands and Poors Charities collection

Among the organisations whose meetings Brooks painted were: The Corporation of Abingdon (1877–1878), Reading Borough Council (1878), the first meeting of London County Council, in the County Hall Spring Gardens (1889) and the Royal College of Surgeons' Court of Examiners (1894).

In 1886, his business address was 7 Trafalgar Studios, Manresa Road, King's Road in south-west London.

His painting Private View of the Old Masters Exhibition, Royal Academy, 1888 features sixty-six people. There are a number of notable contemporary artists in the work, including Sir John Everett Millais, William Holman Hunt, George Richmond, William Powell Frith, Sir Lawrence Alma-Tadema, Frank Holl, Sir Edward Poynter, Sir Philip Burne-Jones, and Sir William Quiller Orchardson. Other notable people are critic John Ruskin (who was not present at the event), banker Alfred de Rothschild, and prime minister William Ewart Gladstone. It also includes a self-portrait. In 1914, he recalled the circumstances in which the work was conceived:

I was painting a portrait of Mr Thomas Brock A.R.A., now Sir Thomas Brock R.A., which was subsequently hung at the Royal Academy... During one of the sittings, Mr Brock and I were talking about Mr Frith's group representing a Private View at the Royal Academy. I observed that I would like to try my skill and see whether I could produce an Artistic picture of some similar scene. Mr Brock suggested a picture of the Private View at the Old Masters Exhibition. I thought this an excellent subject possessing great artistic possibilities.

He donated the painting to the National Portrait Gallery in 1919.

On 28 February 1899 he attended Windsor Castle to present to Queen Victoria his paintings of her reception of the chairmen and conveners of county councils and the mayors and provosts of the United Kingdom. The reception had been held at Buckingham Palace in 1897, as part of Victoria's Diamond Jubilee celebrations. He also painted Victoria, near the end of her reign, in a work called Queen Victoria's Last Ceremony, in which she was shown receiving Lord Roberts and his staff on their return from Africa. The painting was exhibited at Graves' Galleries, Pall Mall, in London in June 1901, following her death. The admission charged was one shilling.

29 January 1902 issue of The Tatler reported that Brooks was working on a 9-by-6-foot (2.7 m × 1.8 m) picture of the attendees at a first-night of Stephen Phillips' play Ulysses at Her Majesty's Theatre, London, which was to include some 300 portraits, including the Royal Family, nobility, politicians, and many other members of high society. He reportedly sent each of the people to be depicted a postcard on which they were requested to supply details such as hair colour, height and what they were wearing at the event.

His work is in a number of collections, including the National Portrait Gallery, the Royal Institution, the Royal Air Force Museum, the City of London Corporation's Guildhall Art Gallery, Reading Museum, the Hunterian Museum, and Brasenose College, Oxford.
