= Owusu-Ankomah =

Ghanaian artist (born 1956)

- Born: Kwesi Owusu-Ankomah; 24 October 1956; Sekondi, Gold Coast
- Died: 6 February 2025 (aged 68); Sekondi, Ghana
- Other name: Brother
- Education: Achimota College; Ghanatta College of Art
- Occupation: Artist
- Website: www.owusu-ankomah.de/index.html

Owusu-Ankomah (24 October 1956 – 6 February 2025) was a leading contemporary African artist with origins in Ghana. His work addresses themes of identity and the body, using his trademark motif of Adinkra symbolism. His work is also "influenced by the art of the Renaissance, handwritten texts from ancient cultures such as the adinkra symbol system of the Akan people of Ghana, Chinese ideograms, and contemporary global cultures." Owusu-Ankomah was a trained artist from Achimota College, near Accra, "established in 1936 and in 1952 incorporated into the University of Science and Technology at Kumasi."

== Early life and education ==
Owusu-Ankomah was born in 1956 in Sekondi, Gold Coast (present-day Ghana). Between 1971 and 1974, he studied at the Ghanatta College of Art in Accra, Ghana.

== Career ==
Beginning in 1979, he embarked on a series of journeys to Europe, making contact with European artists and galleries. From 1986, Owusu-Ankomah lived in the city of Bremen in Germany. He was also recognized as an expatriated artist due to his journey to Germany.

The Asanteman system of adinkra signs provided recurring motifs for the artist's large canvases. He re-interpreted their symbolism in the context of gallery art, while retaining much of their original meaning. Owusu-Ankomah's paintings dealt with scientific, technological, metaphysical and spiritual facts and truths. The evolution of the human, consciousness, the nonlocality of the soul and its eternal progression. He believed emphatically that there has been other ancient highly advanced civilizations before Egypt who were adepts in sacred geometry, which he used in his work. He recognized and presented in his latter works more crop circles, his way of bearing witness to the truth underlying the fact that we are not alone in the universe, that we have been visited and are still being visited. Between 2004 and 2008, he cultivated the lifestyle of a hermit, reflecting, meditating and researching, coining the word Microcron. He had discovered, as he said, the ultimate symbol, the symbol of symbols, with its accompanying theory and philosophy that he also called the Microcron.

A 2025 article in Nka journal noted that, looking at some of "his strongest pieces, which have historically been black-and-white, he pushes the relationship between the figures and the symbols further. He also uses two figures rather than one, generating a sense of energy and depth. But some recent paintings included in this exhibition (MICROCRON BEGINS) show a dramatic shift into color, an emphasis on tone rather than line, and a more hierarchical composition. These works seem transitional, as if he is feeling his way toward pieces that are more spacious, sparse, and potentially introspective. Now that he is in his fifties, there is a synthesis in his thought that is looking for new outlets in his visual work. But one hopes he won't leave the linear strength and dynamism of his black-and-white compositions behind."

Owusu-Ankomah exhibited throughout Germany, as well as internationally in Britain and the US, Europe, South Africa, South America and Asia. He collaborated with designer Giorgio Armani on a line of clothing for the Red Campaign.

== Selected solo exhibitions ==
- 1977: Art Centre, Accra, Ghana
- 1989: From Sharpeville to Soweto, Übersee-Museum Bremen, Germany
- 2005: Heroes, Sages and Saints, National Museum of Ghana, Accra, Ghana
- 2011: Microcron - Kusum: Secret Signs - Hidden Meanings, October Gallery, London, UK
- 2014: Microcron Begins, October Gallery, London, UK

== Private collections ==
- Prince Olivier Doria d'Angri
- Michele Faissola (Deutsche Bank), Sammlung Kalkmann - Bodenburg (Germany)
