= College of Humanities and Social Sciences (KNUST) =

College in Ghana

- Established: 2005
- Provost: Charles Ofosu Marfo
- Location: Kumasi, Ghana
- Colours: Purple and white
- Website: cohss.knust.edu.gh

The College of Humanities and Social Sciences (CoHSS) is one of the six colleges of the Kwame Nkrumah University of Science and Technology in Kumasi, Ghana.

This college, like all five others, was established on 4 January 2005, following the promulgation of the new statutes. The college started with four academic Faculties: Art, Law, School of Business and Social Sciences, and a Research Centre; the Centre for Cultural and African Studies. It was named the College of Arts and Social Sciences.

After a decade of growth the university decided to restructure the college to enhance efficiency in management. At the beginning of the 2014/2015 academic year the University Council approved the transfer of the Faculty of Art from the college to reconstitute the College of Art and Built Environment (CABE). Following the departure of the Faculty of Art the name of the college has changed to College of Humanities and Social Sciences (CoHSS).

Currently, the college now has three Faculties i.e. Law, Social Science and the School of Business, and the Research Centre. Not withstanding the changes, the college remains the watershed of knowledge for all faculties in the university, offering diverse and cross cutting courses to the numerous departments in university. This is based on the philosophy that the sciences need a modicum of the liberal arts to function effectively in their various professions. Since the human and social aspects in the various fields of academia are inevitable, the college's contribution towards the achievement of the university's mandate cannot be underestimated. The college is therefore central in the quest for relevant knowledge creation in the university. The activities of the college also help in reducing the tension and stress associated with laboratory and studio-based programmes, and orient the scientists to mainstream society in any scientific and technological innovations.

== Academics ==
Sir Arku Korsah Law Library

The College of Humanities and Social Sciences is an amalgamation of three Faculties, fourteen (14) Departments and a Research Centre. The amalgamation was in line with the university's objective to achieve good governance and academic excellence through the restructuring of academic and administrative units into Colleges.

=== Faculty of Social Sciences ===
- Department of Economics
- Department of English
- Department of Geography & Rural Development
- Department of History & Political Studies
- Department of Languages & Communication Sciences
- Department of Sociology & Social Work
- Department of Religious Studies

=== Faculty of Law ===
- Department of Commercial Law
- Department of Private Law
- Department of Public Law

=== KNUST School of Business ===
- Department of Supply Chain and Information Systems
- Department of Marketing and Corporate Strategy
- Department of Human Resource and Organizational Development
- Department of Accounting and Finance

== Research ==
- Centre for Cultural and African Studies

=== List of Students’ Association Presidents ===
- Solomon Dickson 2020-2021
- Ben-Carl Dzobgo 2019-2020
- Kwadwo Nketia Fidelis 2018-2019
- Dennis Sarpong 2017-2018
- Joshua Budu 2016-2017
- George Acquaye 2015-2016
- Henry Adjei 2014-2015
- Ahmed Salim Nuhu 2013-2014
- Fugah Caleb 2012-2013
- Edem Klu Joseph 2011-2012
- Dziwornu Richard Kovor 2021-2022
- Nana Agyei-Gyebi 2024 - 2025
- Karim Hamza 2025 - 2026

=== List of Students’ Association Vice Presidents ===
- Raphael Quainoo Junior 2020-2021
- Herbert Afriyie 2019-2020
- Samuel Kyeremateng 2018-2019
- Benjamin Kodua Nti Darkwa Kodua 2021-2022
