= Vernissage =

Preview of an art exhibition

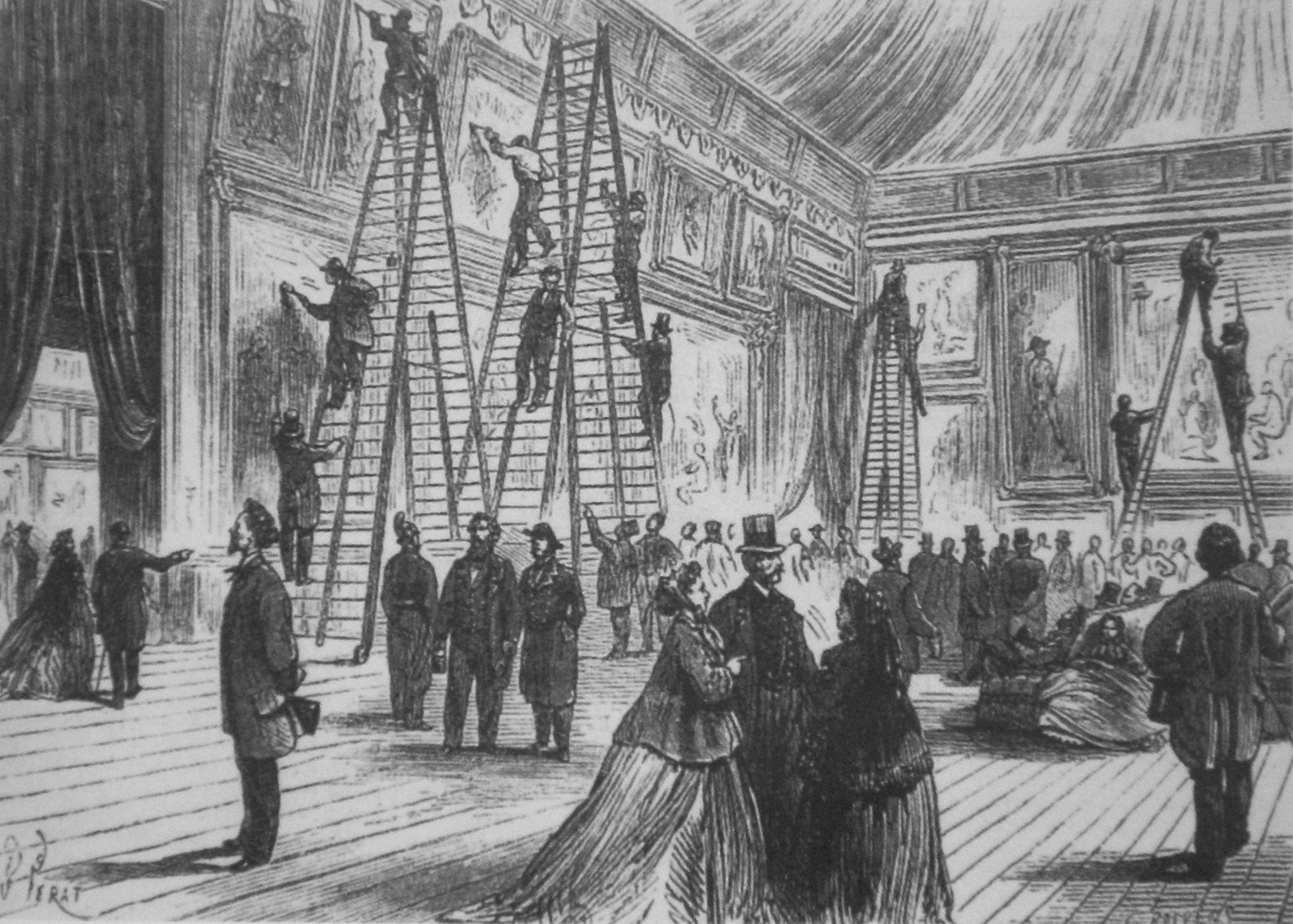
Vernissage, Salon (Paris), 1866.

A vernissage (from French, originally meaning "varnishing") is a preview of an art exhibition, which may be private, before the formal opening. If the vernissage is not open to the public, but only to invited guests, it is often called a private view.

== History ==
At official exhibitions in the nineteenth century, such as the Royal Academy summer exhibition, artists would give a finishing touch to their works by varnishing them. The custom of patrons and the élite of visiting the academies during the varnishing day prior to the formal opening of the exhibition gave rise to the tradition of celebrating the completion of an art work or a series of art works with friends and sponsors. In the twentieth century it became an opportunity to market the works on view to buyers and critics.

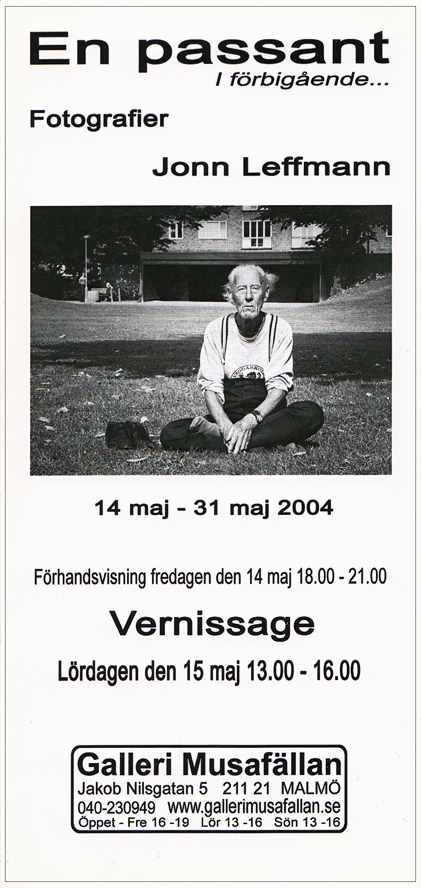
Invitation card to a vernissage.

== Related terms ==
There is a comparable ceremonial ending of art exhibitions, called a finissage, from the French word meaning "finishing". Larger art exhibitions may also have an event halfway through their residency called a midissage. These latter terms are rare in English; they are more commonly used in German and Dutch but not in French.

== See also ==
- Private view
- Yerevan Vernissage
