= Naomi Gakunga =

Kenyan sculptor and visual artist

Naomi Wanjiku Gakunga
- Born: 1960 (age 65–66); Gacharage, Kenya
- Occupation: Sculptor

Naomi Wanjiku Gakunga (born 1960), is a Kenyan sculptor and visual artist. She was shortlisted for the Financial Times/Oppenheimer Funds Emerging Voices Awards in 2016 and 2017.

== Early years and education ==
Gakunga was born in Gacharage, Kenya in 1960. She had her tertiary education at the University of Nairobi in Kenya where she acquired a bachelor's degree in Design. She furthered at the University of California in Los Angeles.

== Career ==
Before leaving for the United States to pursue her graduate studies, Gakunga lectured at the University of Nairobi. She uses tin cans, textured sheet metal and steel wire to create wall-hanging sculptures. She has exhibited her works in the US, the UK, France, Brazil, Poland and Kenya. Some of the shows she has exhibited at include; the 2017 solo exhibitions at the October Gallery in London, Bihl Haus Arts in San Antonio, Frieze New York, the Art Paris Art Fair, and the Cape Town Art Fair. Her sculpture Mũgogo – The Crossing was exhibited at the Royal Academy of Arts in London.

== Personal life ==
Gakunga is married. She lives and works in San Antonio, Texas.
