= Rachid Koraïchi =

Algerian artist (born 1947)

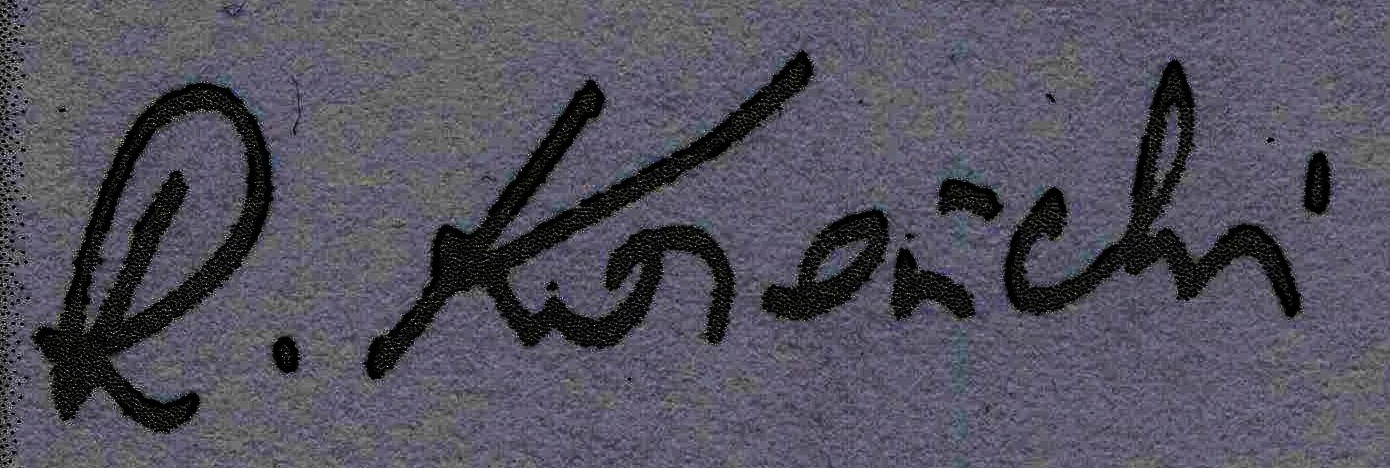
- Signature of Rachid Koraichi
- Born: January 20, 1947 (age 79); Ain Beida, Algeria
- Education: École des Beaux-Arts, Algeria; École des Arts Décoratifs; École des Beaux-Arts, Paris
- Known for: Painter, sculptor, print-maker, installation artist, photographer, ceramicist
- Movement: Hurufiyya movement
- Awards: Jameel Prize (2011)

Rachid Koraïchi (Arabic: رشيد قريشي) is an Algerian artist, sculptor, print-maker and ceramicist, noted for his contemporary artwork which integrates calligraphy as a graphic element.

== Early life and education ==
Rachid Koraïchi was born on 20 January 1947 in Ain Beida, Algeria into a Sufi family of Qu'ranic scholars and copyists.

Koraïchi received his early art education at the École des Beaux-Arts in Algeria, where he studied calligraphy. Later, he attended the École des Arts Décoratifs and the École des Beaux-Arts in Paris.

His Sufi upbringing has influenced much of his work by giving him an interest in scripts and symbols. For Koraïchi, writing is sacred and charged with meaning. His work makes extensive use of Arabic calligraphy as well as glyphs drawn from other languages.

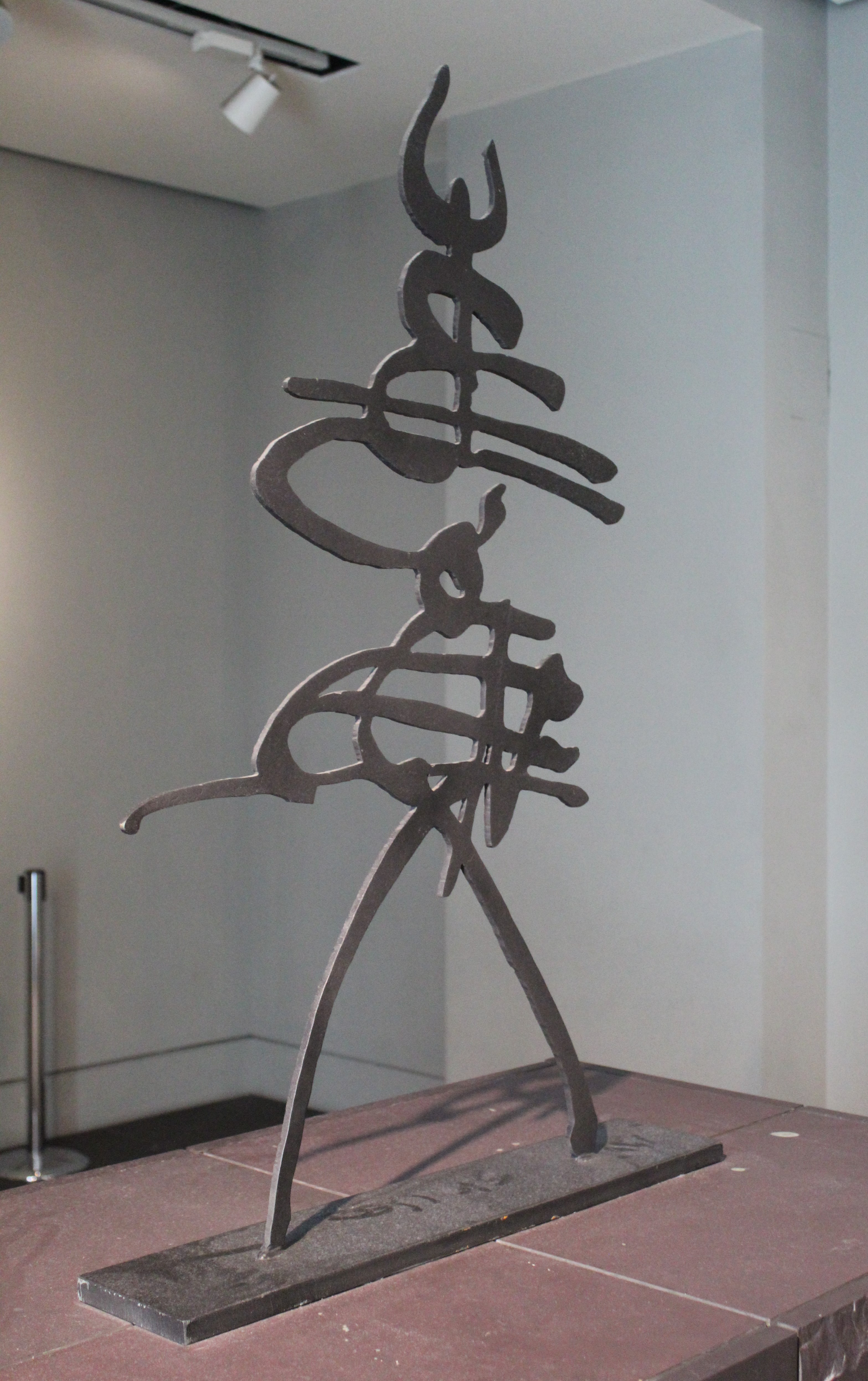
Wrought iron calligraphic figure by Koraichi from the 'Path of Roses' series, 2000-2004, in the British Museum

== Work ==
Koraïchi has produced work in varied media, including ceramics, textiles, installation art, metallurgy, painting, and printmaking, and often collaborates with local artisans in his work.

== Career ==
In 2001, Koraïchi exhibited at the Venice Biennale.

In 2011, Koraïchi won the Jameel Prize from the Victoria and Albert Museum, London.

== Exhibitions ==
Year	Title	Institution	Location	Ref
1998	Jardin du Paradis, Festival International des jardins. Chaumont-sur-loire	Leighton House	London	
1999	Global Conceptualism: Points of Origin, 1950s-1980s	Queens Museum	New York	
1999-2000	Lettres d'Argile	Contemporary Art Museum, Caracas	Venezuela	
1999-2000	Lettres d'Argile		Limoges	
1999-2000	Lettres d'Argile		Algeria	
2000	L'Enfant Jazz	Institut de monde arabe	Paris	
2001	Beirut's Poem and Path of Roses	National Gallery of Fine Art	Amman, Jordan	
2001	Venice Biennale			
2002	Rachid Koraïchi: 7 Variations autour de l'Indigo	Vieille Charit et Alors Hors Du Temps	Marseille	
2006		MOMA	New York	

== Collections ==
Koraïchi's work is in collections including:

- National Museum of African Art, Washington D.C.
