= Clifford Hall (painter) =

British painter

Clifford Hall

Clifford Hall, ROI, NS, (24 January 1904 – 25 December 1973) was a British painter of street scenes and bohemian life. One of his more recognizable post-war phases was that of people covered to various degrees by a towel or blanket. Some have their faces turned from the viewer or hidden.

== Early life and career ==
Clifford Eric Martin Hall was born in Wandsworth, London and spent his youth in Richmond, at Sheen Avenue, then in Mount Arras Road. He was educated first at Elm Tree House School, then Richmond Hill School from 1914, followed by King's College School, Wimbledon. In the 1920s he studied at Richmond Art School under Charles Wheeler and at Putney Art School under Stanley Anderson. From 1925 to 1927 he studied at the Royal Academy schools where he won a Landseer Scholarship and started accepting portrait commissions, which, together, funded his studies and lodgings in Twickenham. He was influenced by Charles Sims and Walter Sickert. From 1928 he lived in Paris, where he shared a studio in Malakoff with Edwin John, son of Augustus John. Through John he was introduced to the Montparnasse district. He studied under Andre Lhote.

== Return to England ==
Hall returned to England in the 1930s where he painted local scenes in Soho and elsewhere. From 1940 he painted Quentin Crisp three times, but the current whereabouts of two of these works is unknown. He joined an ARP stretcher party near Lots Road, Chelsea, during the Second World War and made independent submissions to the War Artists Advisory Committee. In May 1941, an exhibition of Clifford Hall's war drawings, entitled “Bombs On Chelsea”, was held at the Leger Gallery in Old Bond Street, London, W1. Some of his drawings from that period depicting the effects of air raids are in the Imperial War Museum collection. His work was also part of the painting event in the art competition at the 1948 Summer Olympics.

His second marriage, in 1956, was to Ann Hewson, his student at the Regent Street Polytechnic School of Art.

== Later work ==
Two Figures on a Beach. Oil on canvas, 1965.

Hall's most distinctive work is from his later life when from the mid-1960s he started to paint portraits of women swathed in towels or other fabric almost from head to toe with the face hidden. These works echoed Hall's many earlier works in which women were shown head down, brushing their hair so that the hair obscured the face, or facing away from the spectator, which he had previously interspersed with conventional full face portraits.

The contents of Hall's studio were sold post-mortem in 1982 by Christie's in London and his paintings were thereby fairly widely distributed. They may be found in many British institutional collections, some foreign collections, and often appear at auction.

== Exhibitions ==
Hall exhibited with the Royal Society of Portrait Painters, the Royal Academy, the Royal Institute of Oil Painters(ROI), the New English Art Club, the Royal Society of British Artists, the London Group, the National Society of Painters, Sculptors and Printmakers (NS), and the Chelsea Art Society (CAS). During the final years of his life, Hall served on the councils of three of these art societies: the ROI, the NS and the CAS.

Among galleries, Hall had a one-man exhibition at Helen Lessore's Beaux Arts Gallery in 1935 and after the end of the Second World War, at Roland, Browse and Delbanco (1946, 1947, 1950), the Anthony d’Offay Gallery, the Ashgrove Gallery, the Redfern Gallery, Goupil Gallery, and the Leicester Galleries (1952). A memorial exhibition was held at the Belgrave Gallery in 1977. A further three shows of Hall's work were held at the Belgrave Gallery in 1982, 1989 and 1997.

== Works ==
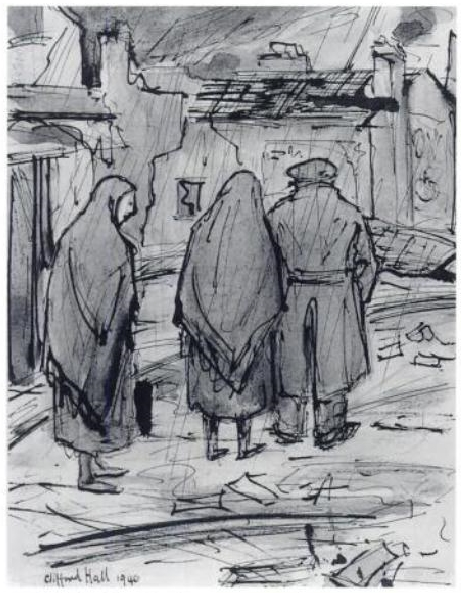
Homeless, watercolour, 1940. Imperial War Museum, London.

This is an incomplete list of works:

- Lincoln Gillespie. Oil on canvas, 1928.
- A Street in Malakoff (Paris). Oil on canvas, 1928. Exhibited at the Royal Academy in 1930. University of Hull Art Collection, Hull.
- Boulogne. Oil on board, 1930.
- Portrait of the artist Arnold Mason. Oil on canvas, 1931.
- The 'Chat Noir'. Oil on canvas, 1932. University of Hull Art Collection, Hull.
- The Caledonian Market, Copenhagen Fields, London. Oil on canvas, 1933. Museum of London, London.
- Woman Dressing. Oil on canvas, 1933.
- Football Match. Oil on board, 1933. National Football Museum, Manchester.
- The Dressing Room. Oil on canvas, 1934.
- Place du Tertre, Paris. Oil on canvas, 1934. National Museums Northern Ireland, Belfast.
- Self Portrait. Oil on canvas, 1935.
- Baby Elephants Entering the Ring. Oil on canvas, 1936.
- Mills Circus Horses, Olympia. Oil on canvas, 1936.
- Clown, Bertram Mills Circus, Cambridge. Crayon and charcoal, 1936.
- Trubka and his Tigers. Oil on canvas, 1937. Exhibited at the Royal Academy in 1954.
- The Thames at Chelsea, London. Oil on panel, 1939. University of Hull Art Collection, Hull.
- Dug Out: An Air Raid Victim Rescued from the Debris. Ink and wash, 1940. Imperial War Museum, London.
- Homeless. Watercolour, 1940. Imperial War Museum, London.
- ...But Damage was Slight and the Number of Casualties Very Small. Watercolour, 1941. Imperial War Museum, London.
- Experimental Camouflage. Watercolour, 1943. Imperial War Museum, London.
- Late Afternoon, Cheyne Row. Oil on canvas, 1944.
- Portrait of John Fothergill, Esq (The Innkeeper). Oil on canvas, 1945. Exhibited at the Royal Academy in 1951.
- In The Bedroom. Oil on canvas, 1946.
- A Reflection of Elegance. Oil on canvas, 1946/47.
- Dovehouse Street, Chelsea. Oil on canvas, 1947.
- Winter. Oil on canvas, 1947. Exhibited at the Royal Academy in 1948.
- Place de l'Odéon (Paris). Oil on canvas, 1948. Exhibited at the Royal Academy in 1948.
- Seated Nude Brushing her Hair. Oil on board, 1951.
- Portrait of Hanna Weil (the artist). Oil on board, 1951. Exhibited at the Royal Academy in 1952.
- Hanna Sleeping. Charcoal on paper, 1953.
- Sleeping. Oil on board, 1954. Exhibited at the Royal Academy in 1954.
- Paignton. Oil on canvasboard, 1956.
- Four Women: Yugoslavia. Oil on board, 1958. Exhibited at the Royal Academy in 1958.
- Abbie – the Artist's Friend. Charcoal, 1958.
- Brighton in April 1964. Oil on board, 1964.
- Antwerp. Oil on panel, 1964.
- Seated Girl Facing Away. Acrylic on canvas, 1964.
- Two Figures on a Beach. Oil on canvas, 1965.
- Evening: Street Scene, Antwerp. Acrylic on board, 1965. Ferens Art Gallery, Hall.
- Towelled Bather. Oil and sand on board, 1967.
- Llanmadoc. Oil on board, 1968. Hastings Museum and Art Gallery, Hastings.
- Bathers. Oil on board, 1969.
- South Devon. Oil on board, 1969.
- The Girl with a Cat. Acrylic on board, 1969. Arts Council Collection, London.
- Shrouded Figure. Acrylic on board, 1970. Hastings Museum and Art Gallery, Hastings.
- Bathers. Oil on board, 1972.
- Figures on the Beach. Charcoal, chalk, 1973.

== Selected publications ==
- Constantin Guys, Flushing, 1805: Paris, 1892. Shenval Press/Faber and Faber, 1945. Introduction by Clifford Hall. General Editor: Lillian Browse.
- How To Paint Portraits, by Clifford Hall. Published in 1932 by John Lane The Bodley Head Limited, London
