= Grove =

Grove may refer to:

- Grove (nature), a small group of trees

== Places ==
=== England ===
- Grove, Buckinghamshire, a village
- Grove (Hammersmith and Fulham ward), an electoral ward
- Grove (Kingston upon Thames ward), an electoral ward
- Grove (Tower Hamlets ward), an electoral ward
- Grove, Nottinghamshire, a village
- Grove, Oxfordshire, a village and civil parish
- The Grove, County Durham, a village
- The Grove, Portland, Dorset

=== United States ===
- Grove, Maine
- Grove, New York, a town
- Grove, Oklahoma, a city
- Grove, Virginia, an unincorporated community
- Grove, West Virginia, an unincorporated community
- Grove Township (disambiguation), various townships

=== Elsewhere ===
- Grove, Tasmania, Australia, a suburb
- Grove, Germany, a municipality in Schleswig-Holstein
- Grove, County Leitrim, a townland in Ireland
- O Grove, Galicia, Spain, a municipality
- Grove (crater), on the Moon

== Schools ==
- Grove Academy, a secondary school in Broughty Ferry, Dundee, Scotland
- Grove Primary School (disambiguation)

== Other uses ==
- Grove (surname)
- HMS Grove, a Second World War destroyer
- Grove Press, an American alternative book publisher
- Grove Cranes, a crane truck manufacturer acquired by Manitowoc Cranes
- Grove Racing, an Australian motor racing team
- Grove United F.C., a football team in Northern Ireland

== See also ==
- Groove (disambiguation)
- Grove cell, a type of electric battery
- Grove's Dictionary (disambiguation)
- Groves (disambiguation)
- Grove City (disambiguation)
- Grove Park (disambiguation)
- The Grove (disambiguation)
