= Grove (surname) =

Grove is an English, Scottish, and Anglo-Norman surname, which came from the Norman French Le Groux, a name for someone who lived by a grove or thicket. Notable people with the surname include:

- Alex Grove (born 1987), Scottish rugby union player
- Amanda Grove, American Court TV personality
- Andrew Grove (1936–2016), Hungarian-born American engineer and businessman; former CEO of Intel
- Archibald Grove (1855–1920), British magazine editor
- Arthur Grove (1864–1942), English botanical and horticultural writer
- Betty Ann Grove, American actress
- Charles Clayton Grove, American mathematician
- Charlotte Grove (1773–1860), British diarist
- David Grove (1935–2023), American archaeologist, academic and Mesoamericanist scholar
- Dick Grove (1927-1998), American musician, composer and educator
- Edwin Wiley Grove, American druggist and millionaire
- Eleanor Grove (1826-1905), British educationist
- Elliot Grove, Canadian-born film producer
- Emily Grove (athlete) (born 1993), American pole vaulter
- Emily Grove (singer) (born 1991), American singer
- Eric Grove (1948–2021), British naval historian and defence analyst
- Frederick Philip Grove alias Felix Paul Greve, German-Canadian author
- George Grove (1820–1900), British engineer and writer on music, known for Grove's Dictionary of Music and Musicians
- Jake Grove, American football offensive lineman
- John L. Grove, American industrialist
- Joseph Grove (1699–1764), English biographer
- Joseph T. Grove (1845–1927), American politician from Maryland
- Kathy Grove (born 1948), American photographer
- Kendall Grove, American mixed martial arts fighter
- Kenneth Grove (born 1953), Australian driver
- Lefty Grove (1900–1975), American baseball pitcher
- Logan Grove (born 1998), American actor
- Marmaduke Grove (1878–1954), Chilean air force officer and politician, founder of the Socialist Party of Chile
- Marilyn Judith Grove (1941–1997), New Zealand cartoonist better known as Kim Casali
- Michael Grove (born 1996), American baseball player
- Neil Grove (born 1971), South African-English mixed martial artist
- Noah Grove (born 1999), American ice sled hockey player
- Patrick Grove (born 1975), Australian internet and media entrepreneur in Asia
- Rupert Grove (1906–1982), Australian solicitor
- Shannon Grove (born 1965), American politician from California
- Steven Eugene Grove "Euge Groove" (born 1962), American saxophonist
- Tamara Grove, American politician
- William Barry Grove (1764–1818), U.S. Congressman
- William Bywater Grove (1848–1938), English biologist
- William Robert Grove (1811–1896), Welsh judge and physical scientist

== See also ==
- De Graaf, a surname
- Graves (surname)
- Grove (disambiguation)
- Grover (surname)
