= Groove =

Groove or Grooves may refer to:

== Music ==
- Groove (music)
- Groove (drumming)
- The Groove (band), an Australian rock/pop band of the 1960s
- The Groove (Sirius XM), a US radio station
- Groove 101.7FM, a former Perth, Australia, radio station
- Groove (Eurogliders album), 1988
- Groove (Billy Crawford album), 2009
- Groove (Richard "Groove" Holmes album), 1961
- "The Groove" (song), a 1980 song by Rodney Franklin
- Groove Music, Microsoft software
- Groove Records, record label
- "Groove", a song by Exo from Obsession
- "Groove", song by Jay Haze from A Bugged Out Mix
- "Groove", a single by Jack & Jack, 2014
- "The Groove", 2003 song by Muse, B-side to "Time Is Running Out"
- The Groove, a dance club in the CityWalk section of Universal Orlando Resort

== Other uses ==
- Grooves (archaeology), long and narrow indentations
- Groove (engineering), a long and narrow indentation built into a material
- Groove (film), a 2000 US film
- Groove (joinery), a slot cut parallel to the grain
- Grooves (magazine), a music magazine
- Chevrolet Groove, a concept car model, then a sport utility vehicle model sold since 2020
- Microsoft Office Groove, older name of Microsoft SharePoint Workspace
- Major and minor groove, the spaces between two strands of a DNA double-helix

== See also ==
- Richard Holmes (organist) (1931–1991), American jazz organist known as Groove
- Groovin' (disambiguation)
- Groovy (disambiguation)
- Grove (disambiguation)
- Fluting (architecture), in architecture refers to the shallow grooves running vertically along a surface
