= Pleasant Grove High School =

Pleasant Grove High School is the name of several educational institutions, including:

- Pleasant Grove High School (Alabama), Pleasant Grove, Alabama
- Pleasant Grove High School (California), Elk Grove, California
- Pleasant Grove High School (Utah), Pleasant Grove, Utah
- Pleasant Grove High School (Texas), Texarkana, Texas
- Pleasant Grove High School, a former high school in the Pleasant Grove area of Dallas, Texas, succeeded by W. W. Samuell High School in 1955

== See also ==
- Grove High School (disambiguation)
