= The Grove =

The Grove may refer to:

== Places ==
=== United Kingdom ===
- The Grove, County Durham, a village
- The Grove, Portland, Dorset, a village
- Grove Park (Sutton) or The Grove, a public park in Carshalton in the London Borough of Sutton
- The Grove, Hanwell, a former landed estate in London
- The Grove, Highgate, a street in London
- The Grove, Richmond, listed building in North Yorkshire
- Former name of Hampstead Grove in London
- The Grove, now Admiral's House, Hampstead, house in Hampstead, London
- The Grove, now part of Fitzwilliam College, Cambridge

=== United States ===
- AIDS Memorial Grove or The Grove, San Francisco, California, a national memorial
- City National Grove of Anaheim or The Grove, a music venue in California
- Coconut Grove or The Grove, Miami, Florida, a city neighbourhood
- The Grove Plantation, Tallahassee, Florida
- The Grove Resort & Water Park, Winter Garden, Florida
- Kennicott Grove or The Grove National Historic Landmark or The Grove, an area in Glenview, Illinois
- The Grove, St. Louis, Missouri, a business district
- Cherry Grove, New York, a hamlet often referred to as The Grove
- The Grove, Texas, an unincorporated community

== Buildings and districts on the United States National Register of Historic Places ==
- The Grove (Saginaw, Michigan), a residential and civic historic district
- The Grove (Cold Spring, New York), a house
- The Grove (Rhinebeck, New York), a house
- The Grove (Tarboro, North Carolina), a house
- The Grove (Jefferson, Texas), a house
- The Grove (Bristol, Virginia), a house
- The Grove (Hanover, Virginia), a house

== In business ==
- Marketplace at The Grove, College Grove, San Diego
- The Grove, Watford, Hertfordshire, England, a hotel
- The Grove of Anaheim, California, an indoor live music venue
- The Grove at Farmers Market, Los Angeles, California, a retail and entertainment complex
- The Grove at Plymouth, Massachusetts, a shopping mall
- The Grove at Shrewsbury, New Jersey, a shopping center
- The Grove Mall of Namibia, Windhoek, Namibia

== School-related ==
- Lakefield College School, Lakefield, Ontario, Canada, also known as The Grove
- The Grove House, one of the school houses at Harrow School, Harrow, London, England
- The Grove, part of the grounds of Magdalen College, Oxford, England
- Woodhouse Grove School or The Grove, Apperley Bridge, West Yorkshire, England
- The Grove (Ole Miss), a tailgating area on the campus of the University of Mississippi
- Grove Primary School (South Africa), a primary school in Cape Town, South Africa

== Other uses ==
- The Grove tube station, an authorised, but never built Central London Railway station
- The Grove, the ground of Halesowen Town F.C., English association football club
- "The Grove" (The Walking Dead), an episode of the television series
- KFDS-FM, a country music radio station licensed to Mountain Grove, Missouri, branded as "The Grove"
- The Grove, Hampstead (painting), an 1822 painting by John Constable

== See also ==
- Grove (disambiguation)
- The Groves (disambiguation)
