= Groove FM =

Groove FM may refer to the following radio stations:

- CJGV-FM, in Winnipeg, Canada
- Groove FM (New Zealand)
- Groove 101.7FM, in Perth, Australia
