= Grove School =

Grove School, or a name similar, may refer to one these schools:

== U.S. ==
- Grove School (Connecticut)
- The Grove School in California
- Grove High School in Oklahoma
- Cary-Grove High School in Illinois
- Grove City High School in Ohio

== U.K. ==
- Grove School, Market Drayton in Market Drayton, Shropshire, England
- Grove School, Highgate, a leading secondary school for girls between the 1890s and the 1920s
- Grove House School, a Quaker school in Tottenham
- Grove Park School, in north-east Wales
- Highbury Grove School, London

== See also ==
- Grove High School (disambiguation)
- Groves High School (disambiguation)
- Grove Primary School (disambiguation)
