= Spring Grove High School =

Spring Grove High School could refer to:

- Spring Grove Area High School, Spring Grove, Pennsylvania
- Spring Grove High School (Minnesota), Spring Grove, Minnesota

== See also ==
- Grove High School (disambiguation)
