= Elk Grove High School =

Elk Grove High School may refer to:

- Elk Grove High School (Elk Grove, California)
- Elk Grove High School (Elk Grove Village, Illinois)

== See also ==
- Grove High School (disambiguation)
