= Groves =

Groves may refer to:

== Places ==
- The Groves, an area of York, England
- Groves, Texas, U.S., a city
- Groves High School (disambiguation), several schools
- Groves Stadium, home of BB&T Field, an American football venue in Winston-Salem, North Carolina

== Ships ==
- USS Groves (DE-543), a U.S. Navy destroyer escort cancelled during construction in 1944
- USS Stephen W. Groves (FFG-29), a U.S. Navy guided-missile frigate in commission since 1982

== Other uses ==
- Groves (surname), including a list of people with the surname
- The Groves family, a prominent British theatre family dating back to the Regency era
- Grove's Dictionary of Music and Musicians, an earlier version of The New Grove Dictionary of Music and Musicians

== See also ==
- Category:Sacred groves, various places considered sacred groves
- Grove (disambiguation)
- Graves (disambiguation)
