= The Groves (disambiguation) =

The Groves is a district of York, England.

The Groves may also refer to:

- The Groves, an industrial area within the modern ward of Drypool, Kingston upon Hull, England

== See also ==
- The Groves of Academe, a 1952 novel by American writer Mary McCarthy
- The Grove (disambiguation)
