= Groovin' (disambiguation) =

"Groovin'" is a 1967 song by The Young Rascals and covered by many artists.

Groovin' may also refer to:

- "Groovin'" (Ben E. King song), 1964
- Groovin' (The Young Rascals album), 1967
- Groovin' (Idrees Sulieman album), 1986
- Groovin' (Toshinobu Kubota album), 1987
- Groovin' (Bill Wyman's Rhythm Kings album), 2000
- Groovin' (Paul Carrack album), 2001
- Groovin' (EP), a 1984 EP by The Style Council
- Groovin' with Buddy Tate, a 1961 album by Buddy Tate
- Groovin' with Manfred Mann, a 1964 EP by Manfred Mann
- "Groovin (Out on Life)", a 1969 single by The Newbeats

== See also ==
- Groove (disambiguation)
