= St Michael's Church, Grove Park =

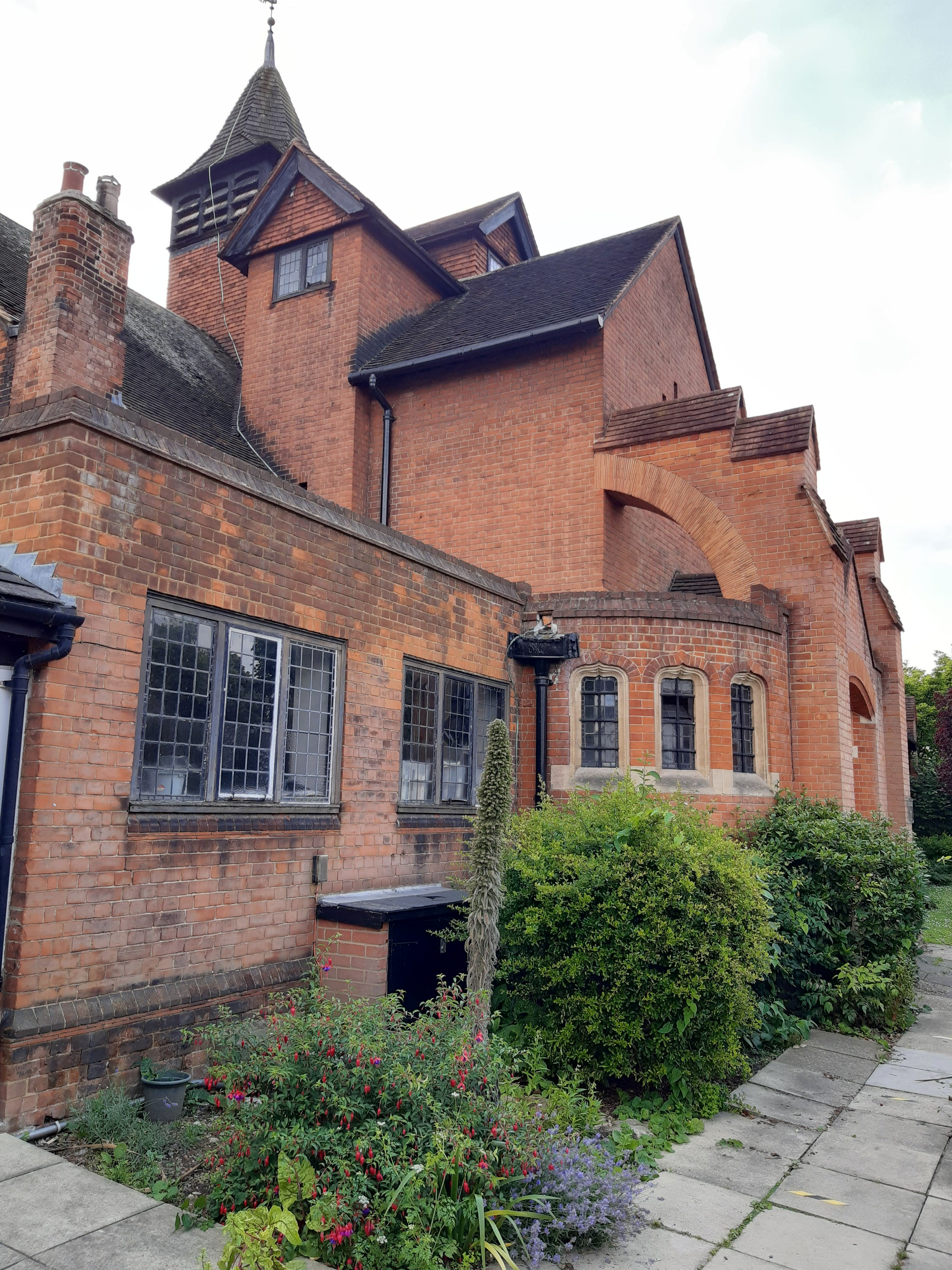
- St Michael's Church, Elmwood Road, completed in 1909
- St Michael's Church, Grove Park
- 51.4875°N 0.2714°W
- OS grid reference: TQ 20092 77900
- Location: Elmwood Road, Chiswick, London
- Country: England
- Denomination: Church of England
- Website: https://www.stmichaelschiswick.org/

History
- Status: Parish church
- Founded: 1908
- Consecrated: 1909

Architecture
- Functional status: Active
- Designated: 1908
- Architect(s): W. D. Caröe; Herbert Passmore

Specifications
- Materials: Brick with stone dressings

Administration
- Diocese: London
- Archdeaconry: Middlesex
- Deanery: Hounslow
- Parish: Grove Park

Clergy
- Vicar: Martine Oborne

Listed Building – Grade II
- Designated: 10 June 1985
- Reference no.: 1240805

St Michael's Church, Grove Park (also called St Michael's, Sutton Court and St Michael's, Chiswick) is an Anglican church in the Grove Park district of Chiswick, opened in 1909. Its red brick architecture by W. D. Caröe & Herbert Passmore has been praised by Nikolaus Pevsner.

== Architecture ==
St Michael's Church on Elmwood Road in the Sutton Court area of Grove Park, Chiswick, was designed in the Arts and Crafts style by the architects W. D. Caröe & Herbert Passmore; it was founded in 1908 and completed in 1909. It is described by Nikolaus Pevsner in The Buildings of England as "one of Caröe's most interesting churches in outer London". The "picturesque" building is in red brick, its buttresses joined by tiled arches, and with dormers in the roof. The crossing-point of the roof is marked by a turret with shingles and tiles; on the north of the crossing is "a curiously domestic excrescence" for ventilation and the church's belfry. The windows have decorative curving stone tracery in "free flamboyant Gothic" style; they are recessed under tiled arches. Inside, the font, lectern, and pulpit were brought from St Michael on the Strand, while the 1911 choir stalls were designed by Caröe. The south chapel's roof has a decoration made by Antony Lloyd in 1932. The stained glass windows in the south chapel and the sanctuary were made by Horace Wilkinson between 1914 and 1925.

The historian Jennifer Freeman writes of the building that "the emphasis externally is on the craftwork, on careful stone dressings, on subtle variations in the tilework, on the timbering, brickwork and leadwork", while it fits into its environment sensitively, in a place "still leafy enough to evoke the setting of a simple country church. Yet the building is a highly complex composition of red brick and tile". The St Michael's church architect Patrick Crawford comments that the most remarkable feature of the church is its tiled arches.

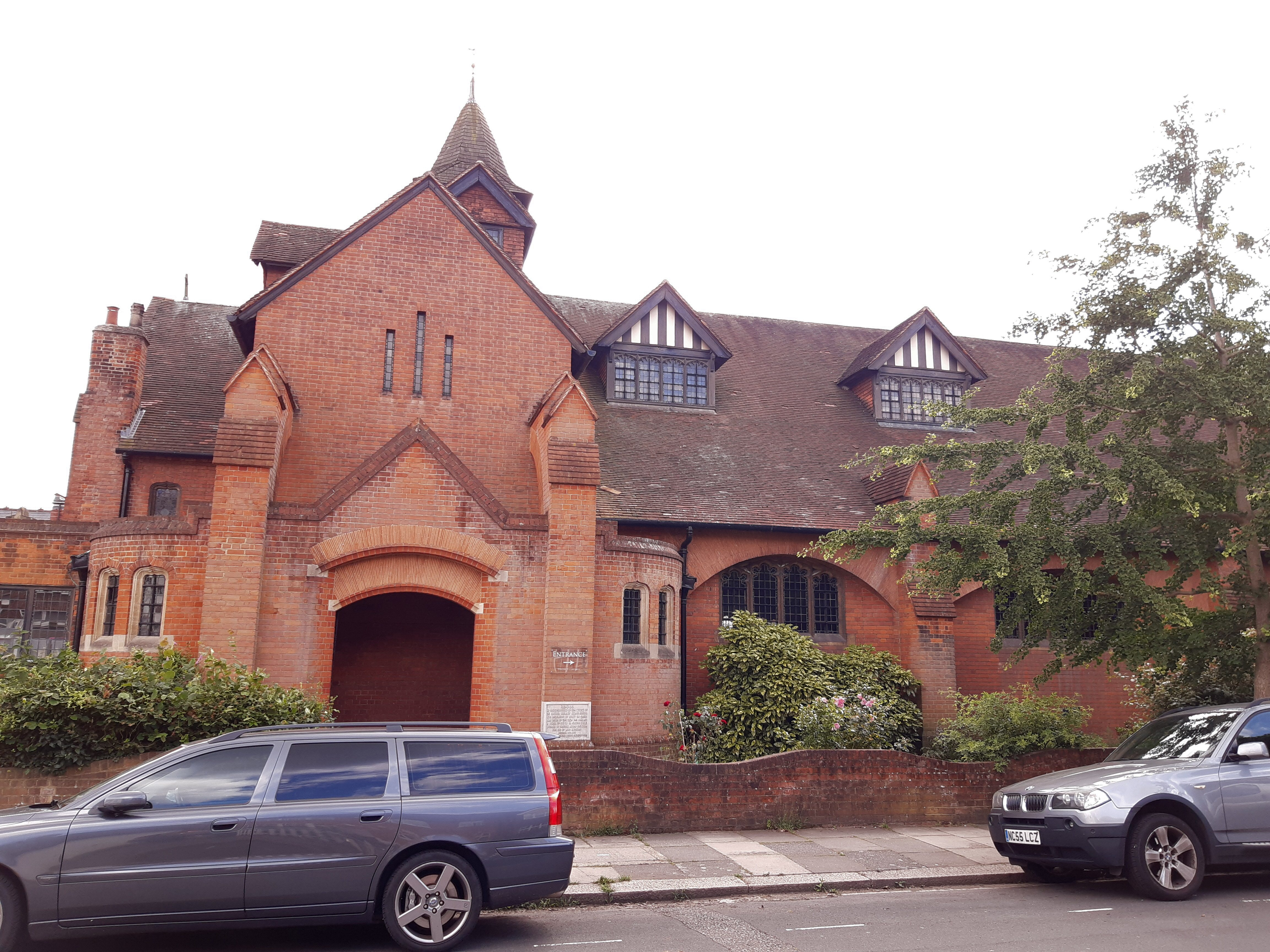
Elmwood Road front, showing some of the unusual shallow tiled arches

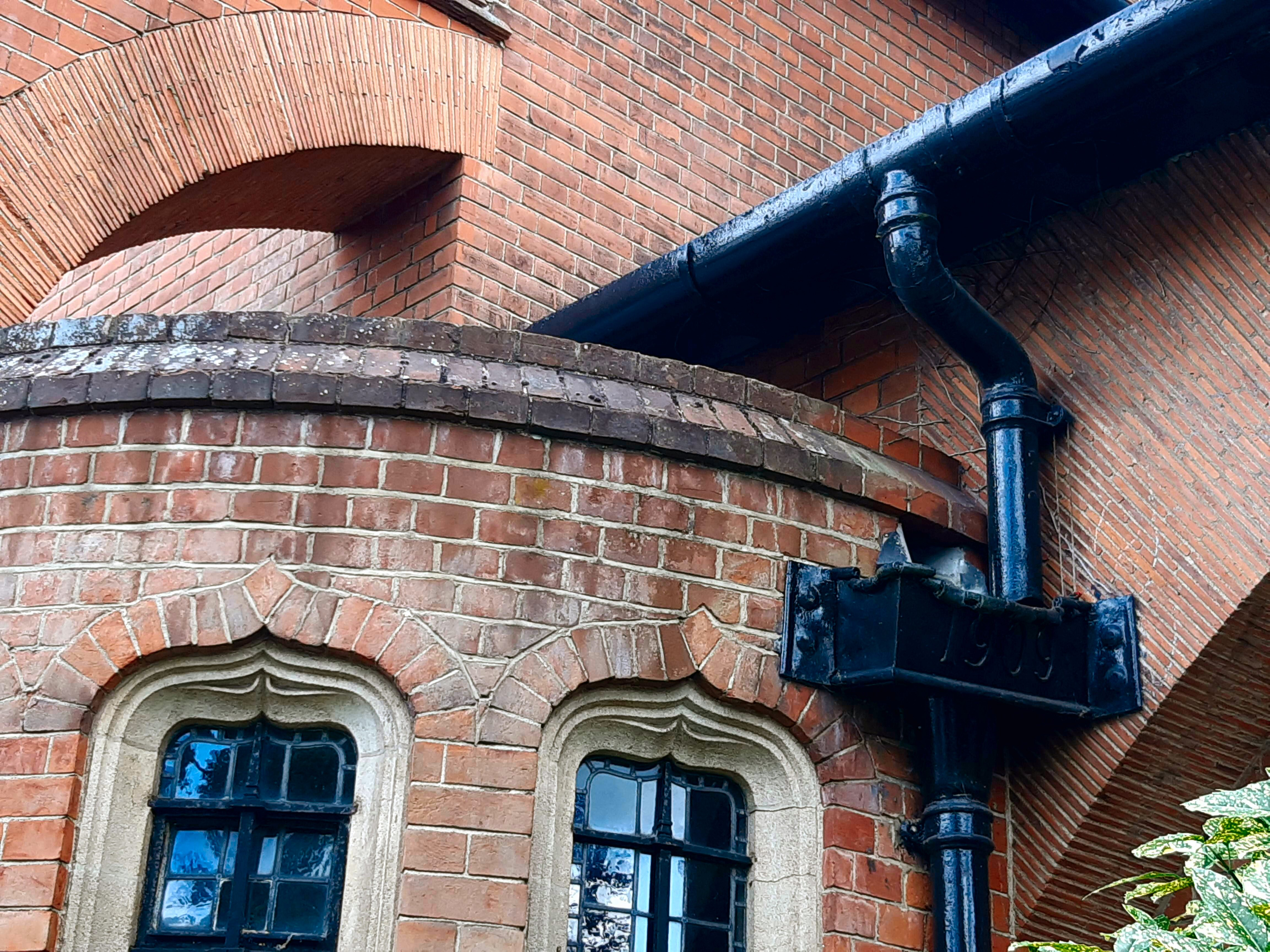
Architectural detail

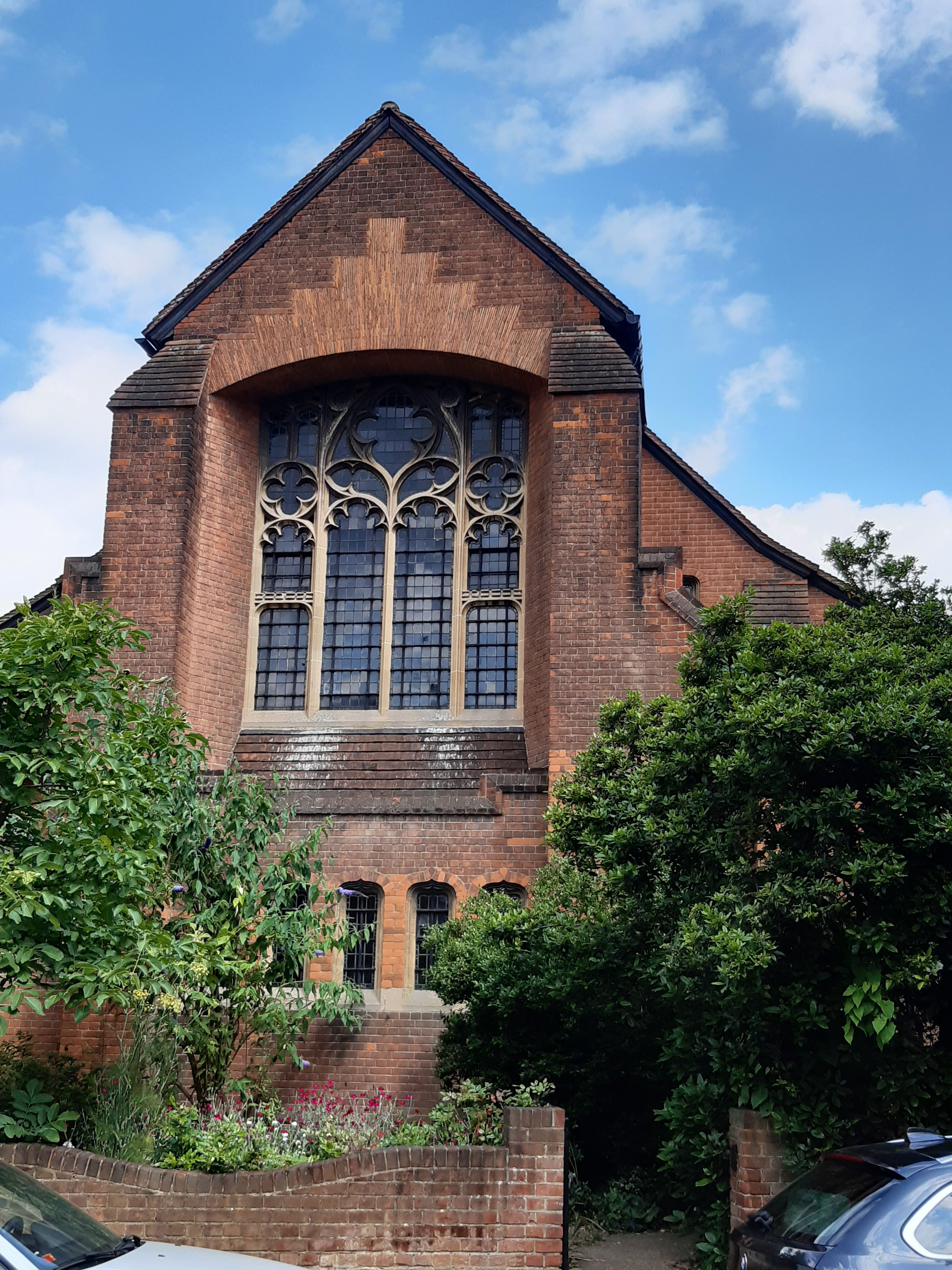
Western end, facing Sutton Lane South

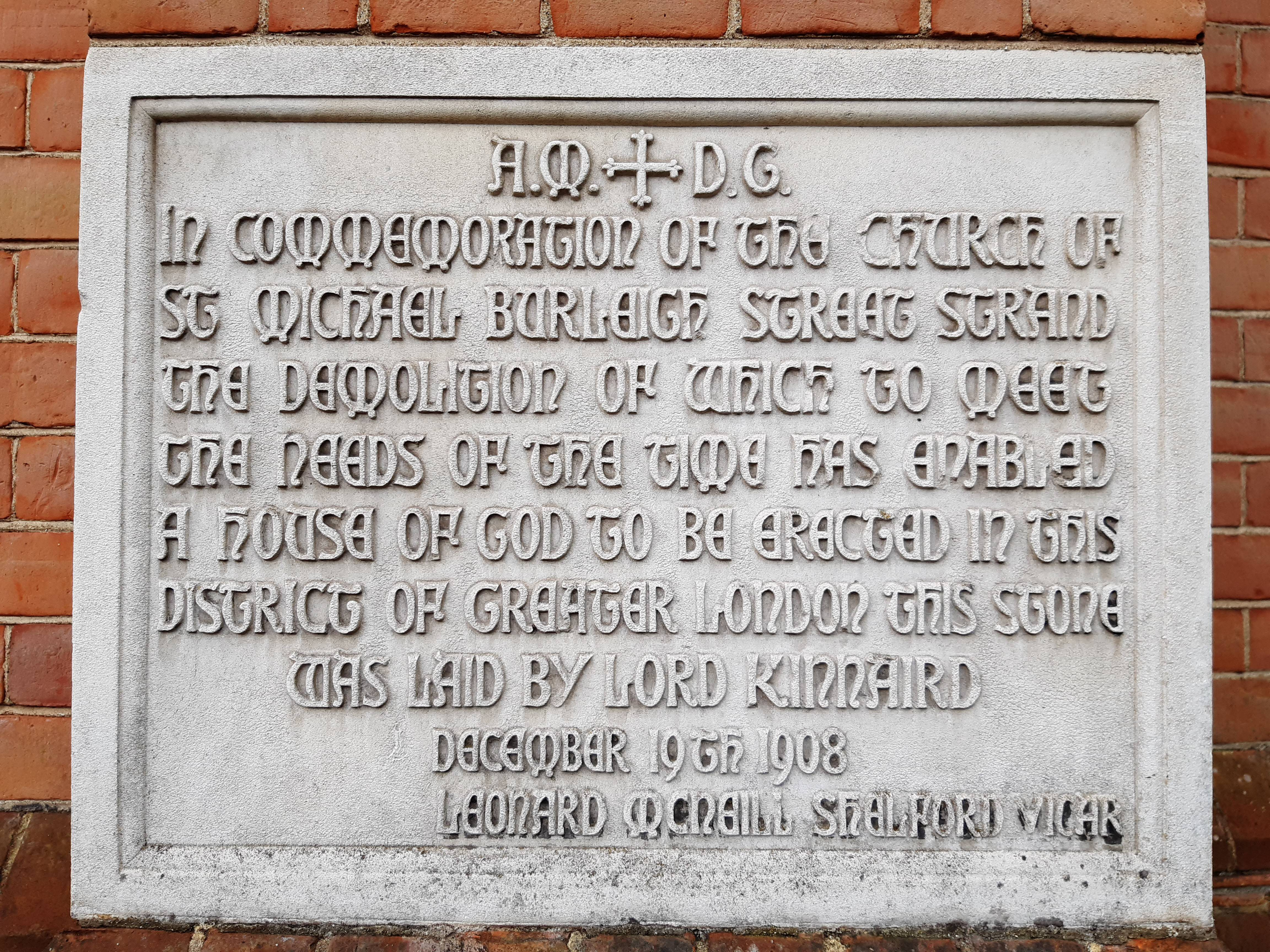
Foundation stone, laid by Lord Kinnaird, 19 December 1908

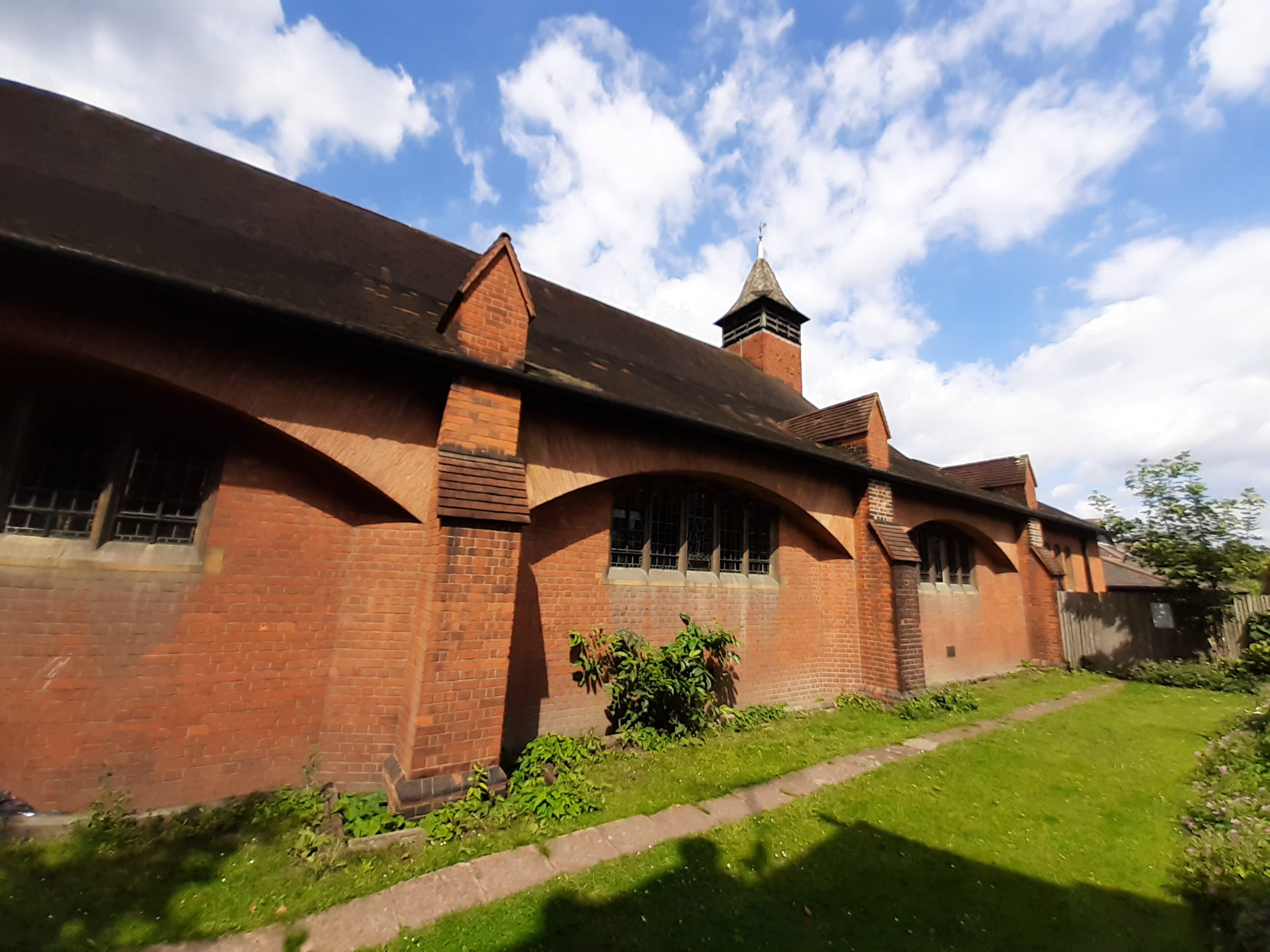
The garden side of the church

== History ==
The building was funded by the sale of St Michael, Burleigh Street, (Note: For a drawing of St Michael, Burleigh Street, see Figure 40 in British History Online's Southampton Street and Tavistock Street Area: Burleigh Street, pp 223–225.) on the Strand, in central London, raising the sum of £20,500. The old church was demolished and replaced by the Strand Palace Hotel. The vicar of St Martin-in-the-Fields, near the Strand, became the patron of the new church. The new church cost £8,000 to build, including its site; the vicarage cost a further £1,800. A tin-roofed wooden church hall was built at a cost of £360; it was replaced in 1998 by a brick-built parish centre.

The church was the last of the Anglican parishes of Chiswick to be created, serving the new population of the Grove Park area west of Sutton Court Road, which had consisted up until the 1900s mainly of orchards and market gardens. The parish area was taken from the western part of the parish of St Nicholas, Chiswick.

The church has been Grade II listed since 1985.

== Sources ==
- Baker, T. F. T.; et al. (1982). "Chiswick: Churches". A History of the County of Middlesex: Volume 7: Acton, Chiswick, Ealing and Brentford, West Twyford, Willesden. British History Online. pp. 90–93.
- Cherry, Bridget; Pevsner, Nikolaus (1991). The Buildings of England. London 3: North West. London: Penguin Books. ISBN 978-0-14-071048-9. OCLC 24722942.
- Clegg, Gillian (1995). Chiswick Past. Historical Publications. ISBN 0-94866-733-8.
