= Grove Park =

Grove Park may refer to:

== United Kingdom ==
=== London ===
==== Districts ====
- Grove Park, Hounslow
- Grove Park, Lewisham
  - Grove Park Cemetery
  - Grove Park railway station
  - Grove Park Sidings
  - Grove Park Nature Reserve
  - Grove Park (ward)

==== Parks ====
- Grove Park (Sutton), a park

=== Elsewhere ===
- Grove Park Business and Enterprise College, a secondary school for boys in Southampton
- Grove Park, Birmingham, a park
- Grove Park, Kent, a suburb of Sittingbourne in Kent

== United States ==
- Grove Park, Florida, an unincorporated community
- Grove Park (Atlanta), a neighborhood of Atlanta, Georgia
- Grove Park-Tilden Township, Minnesota
- Grove Park Inn, a hotel in Asheville, North Carolina

== Canada ==
- Grove Park, Ontaria, an area of the town, Lake of Bays, Ontario

== In Saint Kitts and Nevis ==
- Elquemedo Willett Park, Charlestown, Nevis, known as Grove Park until 2010
