= Groovy (disambiguation) =

Groovy is a slang colloquialism popular during the 1950s to 1970s meaning very fashionable and interesting.

Groovy may also refer to:

== Music ==
- Groovy (album), a 1957 album by jazz pianist Red Garland and his trio
- "Groovy" (song), a 2023 song by Cravity
- Groovy, a 1994 album by Ghanaian musician Kojo Antwi
- "Groovy", a song by Pet Shop Boys from the 2016 album Super

== Computing ==
- Apache Groovy, a 2003 programming language for the Java platform
- Groovy on Rails was the original name for Grails, a 2005 framework for web applications that uses Apache Groovy
- Groovy Gorilla was the code name for the 2020 version of Ubuntu

== Other uses ==
- Winston Groovy (born 1946), Jamaican reggae singer
- Groovy (horse) (foaled 1983), an American Thoroughbred Champion sprint racehorse
- "Groovy", a 2009 episode of the television series QI

== See also ==
- Groove (disambiguation)
