= Amanda Grove =

Amanda Grove is a former Court TV anchor. She joined Court TV in March 2002. She anchored the network's live hourly "Newsbreaks," and served as substitute anchor for the network's daily live trial coverage programs. She also reported from courtroom trials around the country as part of Court TV's signature daytime trial coverage. She regularly appears as a legal expert on Good Morning America, The Early Show, and On the Record with Greta Van Susteren.

Prior to joining Court TV, Grove worked for WCBS in New York City anchoring the station's morning and weekend newscasts, as well as a morning business show for MarketWatch. In addition she hosted the PBS syndicated series World Museum Classics. Before joining WCBS, Grove worked for CNBC business news in New York and London. She also worked in California for KRON's BAY-TV, KNTV in San Jose and KCCN in Monterey. From 1990 to 1996, Grove practiced real estate and corporate law with the firm of Graham & James (now Squire, Sanders & Dempsey) in San Francisco, and served as a deputy district attorney in San Mateo County.

Grove received a B.S. degree in journalism from Northwestern University and a J.D. degree from the University of California Hastings College of the Law in 1990.

She married Robert Holmen on June 29, 2002, and they have 2 sons, Grey August Holmen born January 27, 2003, and Ford Hastings Holmen born March 7, 2004.
