= Lone Grove High School =

Public school in Oklahoma, United States

Location
- 6286 N. Meridian; Lone Grove, Oklahoma 73443; United States
- Coordinates: 34°10′31″N 97°14′48″W

Information
- School type: Public high school
- Established: 1978; 48 years ago
- School district: Lone Grove Public Schools
- Principal: Chris Sudderth
- Teaching staff: 25.65 (FTE)
- Grades: 9–12
- Enrollment: 386 (2023–2024)
- Student to teacher ratio: 15.05
- Campus: Rural: Distant
- Colors: Black and white
- Mascot: Longhorns
- Website: www.lonegrove.k12.ok.us/schools/high-school

Lone Grove High School is a high school located in Lone Grove, Oklahoma, a small town outside Ardmore, Oklahoma. The Longhorn is their official mascot and their colors are black and white.

== History ==
The first public school in Lone Grove opened in 1887 and had two teachers. In 1910, a lawsuit to prevent the school district from constructing a new school was filed with the Oklahoma Supreme Court. The court upheld the results of a local election authorizing the construction of the school, which was built later that year. The first high school building was completed in 1978, which was replaced by a new facility in 2004. In 2008, as part of a 10 million dollar bond issue, the district began construction of a 1500-seat gymnasium at the high school, replacing a much smaller facility that lacked air conditioning. The gym opened in 2011.

== Feeder Pattern ==
Lone Grove High School is part of Lone Grove Public Schools. In total, the district operates 4 schools: Lone Grove Primary for students in grades PK-2, Lone Grove Intermediate for students in grades 3-5, Lone Grove Middle School for students in grades 6-8, and Lone Grove High School for students in grades 9-12.

== Demographics ==
In the 2021–2022 school year, there were 360 students. 20.0% were American Indian/Alaska Native, 3.1% were Black, 6.9% were Hispanic, 60.6% were White, and 9.4% were Two or More Races. 45.8% percent were eligible for free or reduced-price lunch.

== Academics ==
For the 2021–2022 school year, 41.4 percent of students scored at or above the proficient level on the state's standardized test, exceeding the state average of 27.9 percent. The percentage of students at or above proficient was 33.3 percent in 2017–2018 and 39.5 percent in 2018–2019. Assessment data were not collected for the 2019–2020 school year due to the COVID-19 pandemic. 35.4 percent of students were at or above proficient in 2020–2021.

== Athletics ==
Lone Grove High School's softball team won the state championship in 2004, 2021, 2022, and 2024, and finished second in the 2020 class 4A softball championships after losing to Tuttle High School in 11 innings. The school's baseball team were state champions in 1972 and 1974, and finished the 2021 regular season with a 33–0 record. The speech and debate team were state champions in seven consecutive years, from 2004 to 2010.
