= Grove Township =

Grove Township may refer to:

- Grove Township, Jasper County, Illinois
- Grove Township, Adair County, Iowa
- Grove Township, Cass County, Iowa
- Grove Township, Davis County, Iowa
- Grove Township, Humboldt County, Iowa
- Grove Township, Pottawattamie County, Iowa
- Grove Township, Taylor County, Iowa
- Grove Township, Shawnee County, Kansas
- Grove Township, Stearns County, Minnesota
- Grove Township, Harnett County, North Carolina
- Grove Township, Cameron County, Pennsylvania
