= Grove's dictionary =

Grove's dictionary may refer to:

- The Grove Dictionary of Art, former name of Oxford Art Online
- A Dictionary of Music and Musicians (1879–1889, with subsequent revisions in 1910, 1927, 1940, 1954 & 1966) edited by George Grove
- The New Grove Dictionary of Music and Musicians (1980, 2nd ed. 2001), 20 vol. expansion overseen by Stanley Sadie
  - The New Grove Dictionary of American Music (1984)
  - The New Grove Dictionary of Opera (1992)
  - The New Grove Dictionary of Women Composers (1994)
  - New Grove Dictionary of Jazz (2002)
  - The Grove Dictionary of Musical Instruments
