= Groves High School =

Groves High School may refer to:

- Groves High School (Georgia), Garden City, Georgia
- Birmingham Groves High School, Beverly Hills, Michigan
- Port Neches–Groves High School, Port Neches, Texas
- Webster Groves High School, St. Louis, Missouri
- Grove Park School, Wrexham, Wales

== See also ==
- Grove High School (disambiguation)
- Grove School (disambiguation)
