= Grove Primary School =

Grove Primary School may refer to:

- Grove Primary School (South Africa), South Africa
- Grove Primary School, Frimley

== See also ==
- Grove School (disambiguation)
