= Joseph Grove =

Joseph Grove (1699–1764), was an English biographer.

== Life ==
Grove says in his account of William Cavendish, 3rd Duke of Devonshire (p. 21), that his parents lived in Chipping Norton, Oxfordshire, where the family had resided above a century and a half, and that his mother, who had been married to his father above fifty-three years, died on 22 Jan. 1739, aged 73, and his father on 22 March 1740, aged 83. He is therefore identified as the son of Theophilus Groves and his wife Sarah (formerly Stone), baptised at Chipping Norton in 1699. They may have been related to the Grove family of Wargrave in Berkshire where Joseph Grove had lands.

Joseph practised as an attorney, and amassed considerable wealth. Besides property in various counties, he possessed a "pleasant little seat in Richmond, Surrey, called the Belvidere". When in town he lodged in the parish of St. Clement Danes, at the house of a Mrs. Mary Parr, to whom he left an annuity of £14 and all his effects in her possession. There he died on 27 March 1764, and was buried in Richmond Church on 2 April following (Lysons, Environs, iv. 611). He married Rebecca, daughter of Joseph Willmott, citizen and haberdasher of London. She was buried at Banstead, Surrey, on 1 October 1745 (will, P. C. C. 207, Edmonds), leaving no surviving issue. Administration of his estate, with will annexed, was granted at London on 30 March 1764 to Groves Wheeler, his nephew and residuary legatee (registered in P.C.C. 94, Simpson).

After his retirement from the practice of the law Grove unfortunately betook himself to bookmaking. His contributions to learning are of small value. He had a passion for 'adorning' his books with copper-plates, which from their unintentional comicality serve to relieve the heaviness of the text.

== Works ==
Grove's writings are:

- The History of the Life and Times of Cardinal Wolsey … in which are interspersed the lives and memorable actions of the most eminent Persons … Collected from antient records, manuscripts, and historians, 4 vols. London, 1742–4.
- A Reply to the famous Jew Question. In which … is fully demonstrated, in opposition to that performance, that the Jews born here before the late act were never entitled to purchase and hold lands … In a letter to the Gentleman of Lincoln's Inn [Philip Carteret Webb]. By a Freeholder of the County of Surrey, London [1754].
- The Life of Henry VIII. By Mr. William Shakespear. In which are interspersed historical notes, moral reflections …in respect to … Cardinal Wolsey … By the Author of the History of the Life and Time of Cardinal Wolsey, London, 1758. He proposes, if kindly received, to add similar notes to Shakespeare's other historical plays.
- Two Dialogues in the Elysian Fields between Cardinal Wolsey and Cardinal Ximenes, To which are added historical Accounts of Wolsey's two Colleges and the Town of Ipswich, London, 1761.
- The Lives of all the [Cavendish] Earls and Dukes of Devonshire, &c., 8vo, London, 1764.

Other works were planned by him: (1) The History of the Life of King Henry VIII, and (2) Detached Pieces concerning Cardinal Wolsey with a preface "shewing the want of a Complete History of England," the whole to be embellished with copper-plates.
