= Grove Park, Chiswick =

Area of Chiswick, London, England

Coordinates: 51.482639°N 0.320942°W

Grove Park
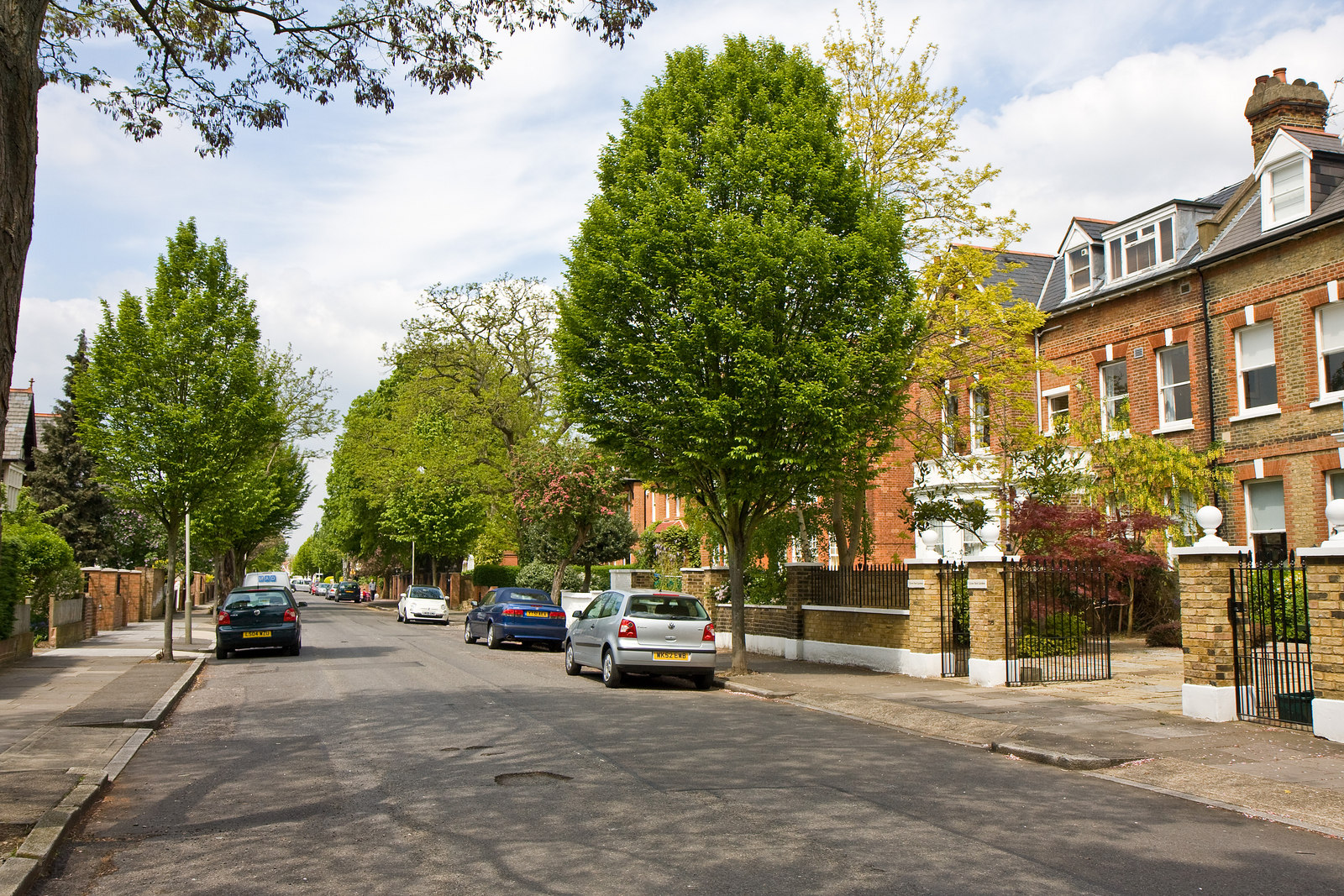
- Grove Park Gardens

- Location within Greater London
- London borough: Hounslow
- Ceremonial county: Greater London
- Region: London
- Country: England
- Sovereign state: United Kingdom
- Post town: LONDON
- Postcode district: W4
- Dialling code: 020
- Police: Metropolitan
- Fire: London
- Ambulance: London
- London Assembly: South West

Grove Park is an area in the south of Chiswick, now in the borough of Hounslow, West London. It lies in the meander of the Thames occupied by Duke's Meadows park. Historically, the area belonged to one of the four historic villages in modern Chiswick, Little Sutton. It was long protected from building by the regular flooding of the low-lying land by the River Thames, remaining as orchards, open fields, and riverside marshland until the 1880s. Development was stimulated by the arrival of the railway in 1849; Grove Park Hotel followed in 1867, soon followed by housing. In the Second World War, the first successful V-2 rocket attack on Britain took place in Staveley Road during September 1944.

The architecture of the area includes houses in British Queen Anne Revival style, while the station building is Italianate. The 1872 neo-Gothic St Paul's Church is built in irregular blocks of stone. It has a small fleche instead of a spire, as well as an apse at its eastern end. St Michael's Church was designed by W. D. Caröe and Herbert Passmore in 1908 in a domestic style in buttressed red brick with tiled arches and with dormer windows in its roof, while the windows use neo-Gothic stone tracery.

Famous former residents of Grove Park include the actor John Thaw, the soldier Bernard Montgomery, and the poet Dylan Thomas. St Paul's vicarage has repeatedly been used as a film set, including in Tinker Tailor Soldier Spy, Killing Eve, Lewis, Grantchester, and The Theory of Everything.

== Geography ==
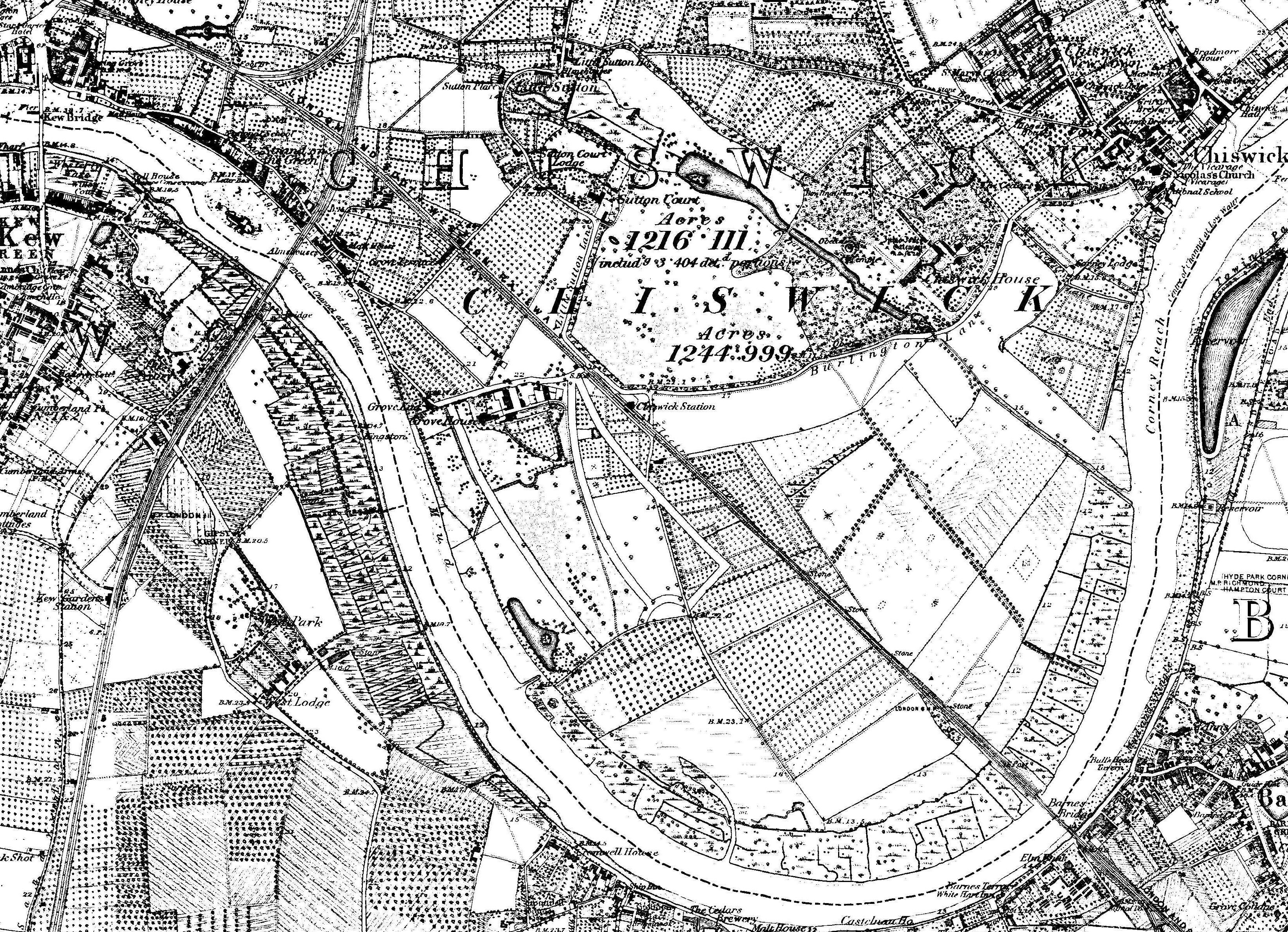
Grove Park area on Ordnance Survey map, c. 1880. Little Sutton is top centre; Kew Bridge and Strand-on-the-Green top left; Chiswick House and Gardens top centre right, and Old Chiswick top right. Grove House and its Park are centre left between the river and the railway leading to Barnes Railway Bridge. A broad strip beside the river is marked as marsh; much of the peninsula is shown as orchard (arrays of dots) or open fields.

Much of Grove Park was still rural until late in the 19th century; the risk of flooding from the tidal Thames protected it from building. One of the four constituent villages of Chiswick, Little Sutton, was in the Grove Park area, about the centre of the parish of Chiswick at that time; two other villages, Strand-on-the-Green and Old Chiswick, lie just to the west and to the east of Grove Park, respectively, with Turnham Green to the north.

== History ==
=== Grove House to housing estate ===
A house stood on the site of Grove House from 1412; it was replaced by 1705 with, according to a contemporary observer, "a spacious regular modern building ... pleasantly situated by the Thames side. Behind it are gardens by some said to be the finest in England". Grove House was owned by the Barker family at that time; from 1745 it belonged to the Earl of Grantham and then to an eccentric animal-lover, Humphrey Morice. The Duke of Devonshire bought the whole estate in the 1840s, reshaping Grove House without its third storey, and letting it to tenants.

The building of the railways including Chiswick railway station in 1849 spurred development. Grove Park Hotel was built in 1867, soon followed by housing. Growth was slow but steady, with residential development accompanied by small-scale industry such as soap making.

Robert William Shipway bought Grove House in the 1890s; it was demolished in 1928 and replaced by the houses on the west side of Kinnaird Avenue.

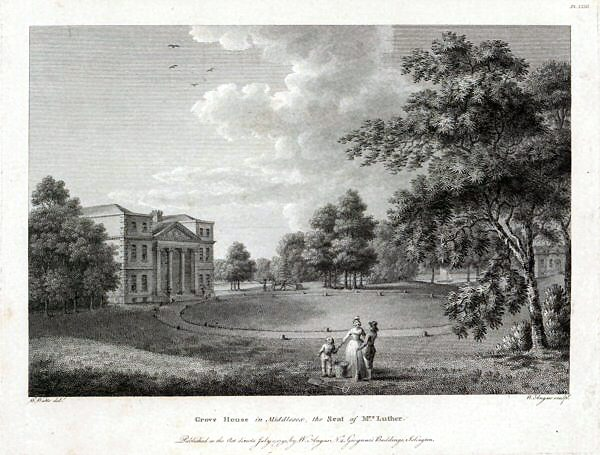
Engraving of Grove House by W. Wade, 1792

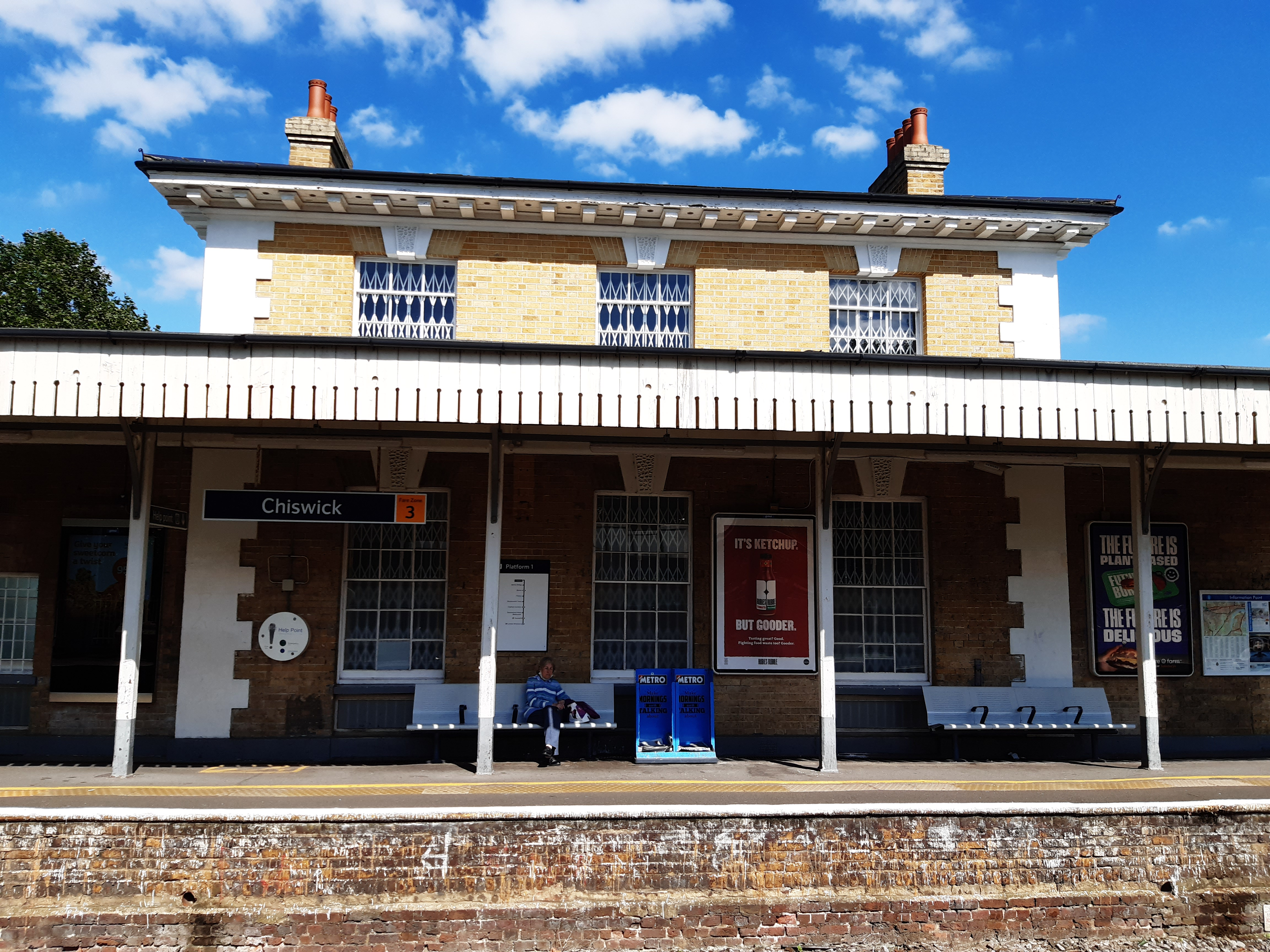
Chiswick Station, 1849, described by Pevsner as "Italianate"

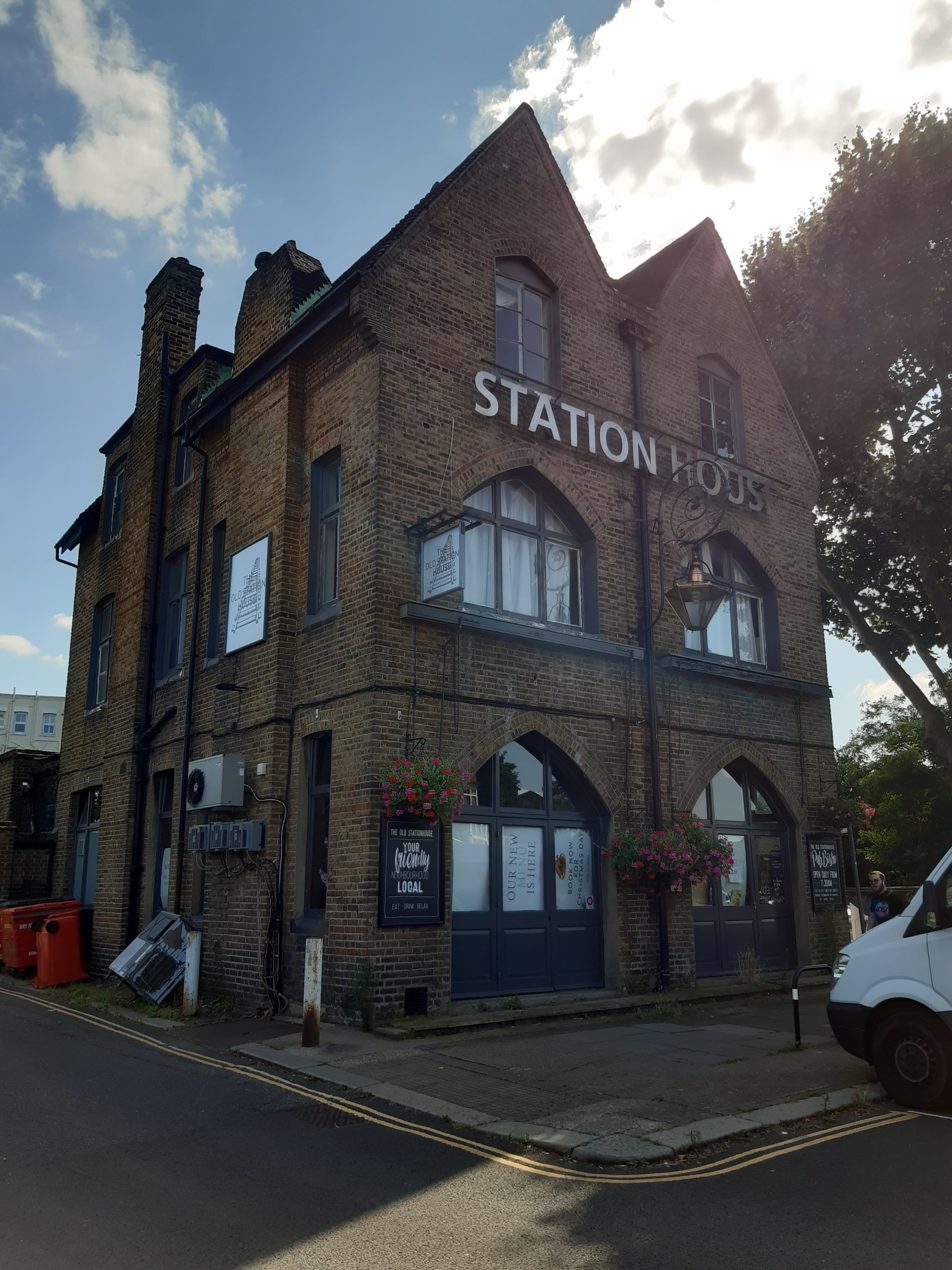
Grove Park Hotel, 1867,
now Station House

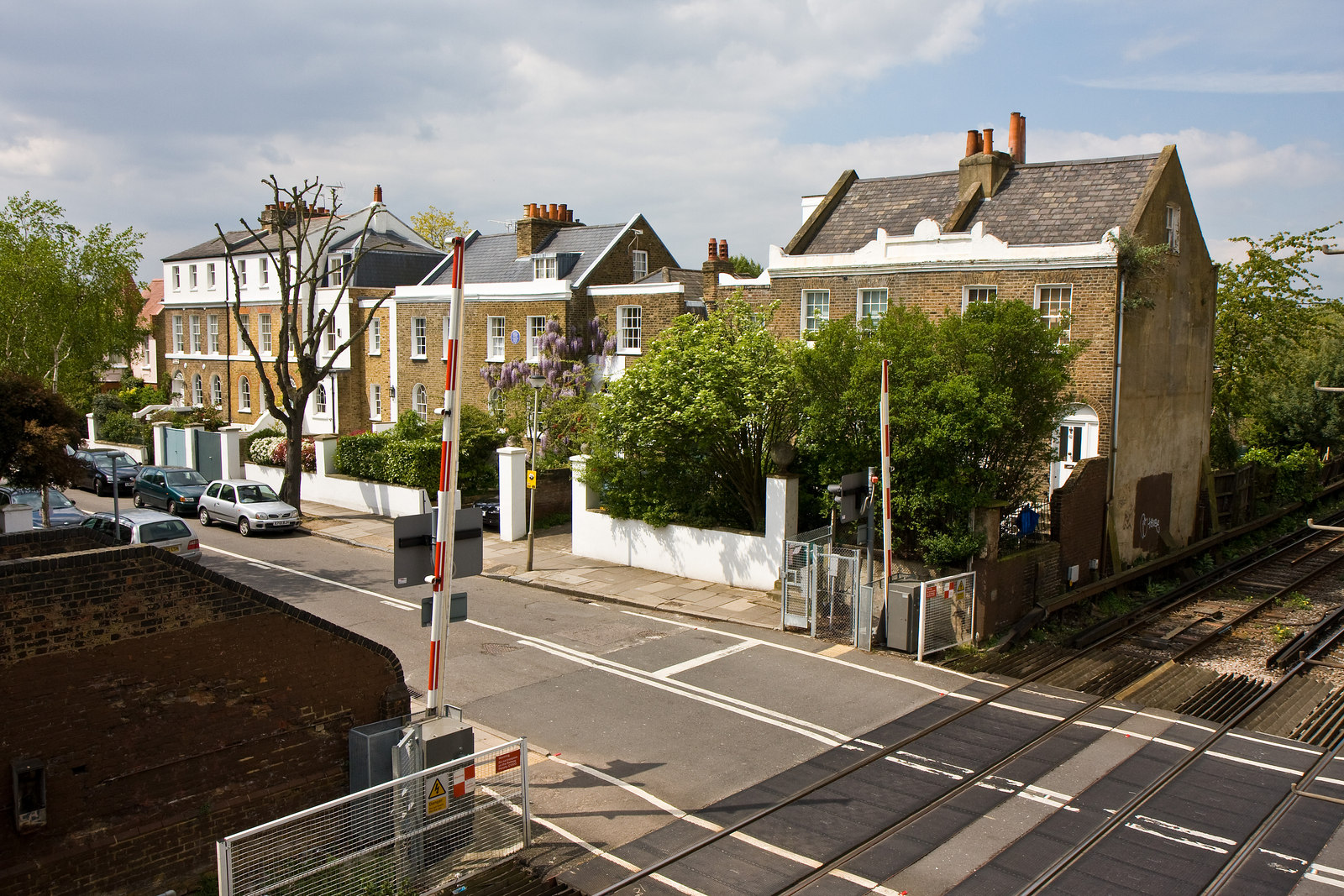
Grove Park Terrace level crossing

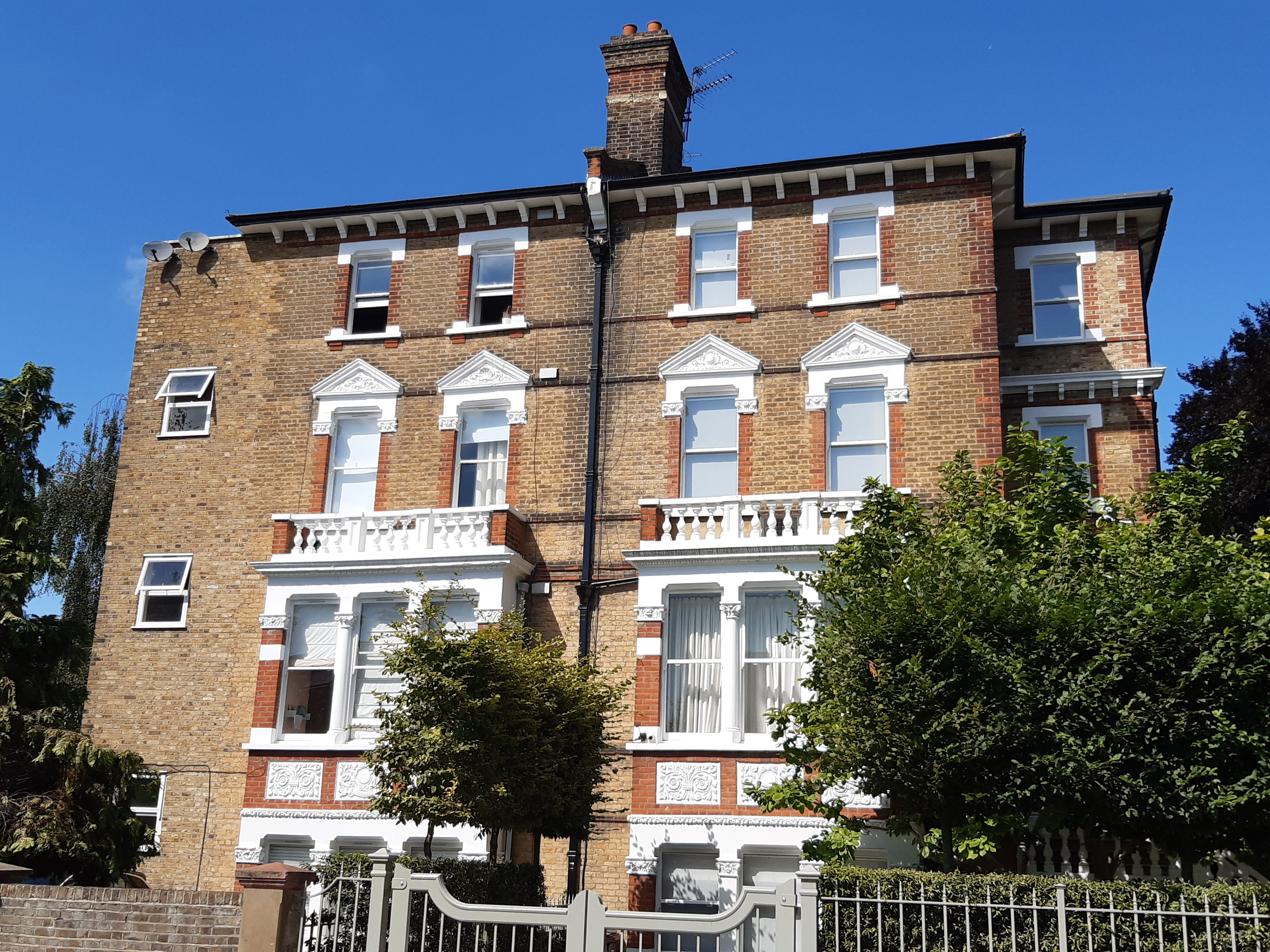
Large houses on Grove Park Road

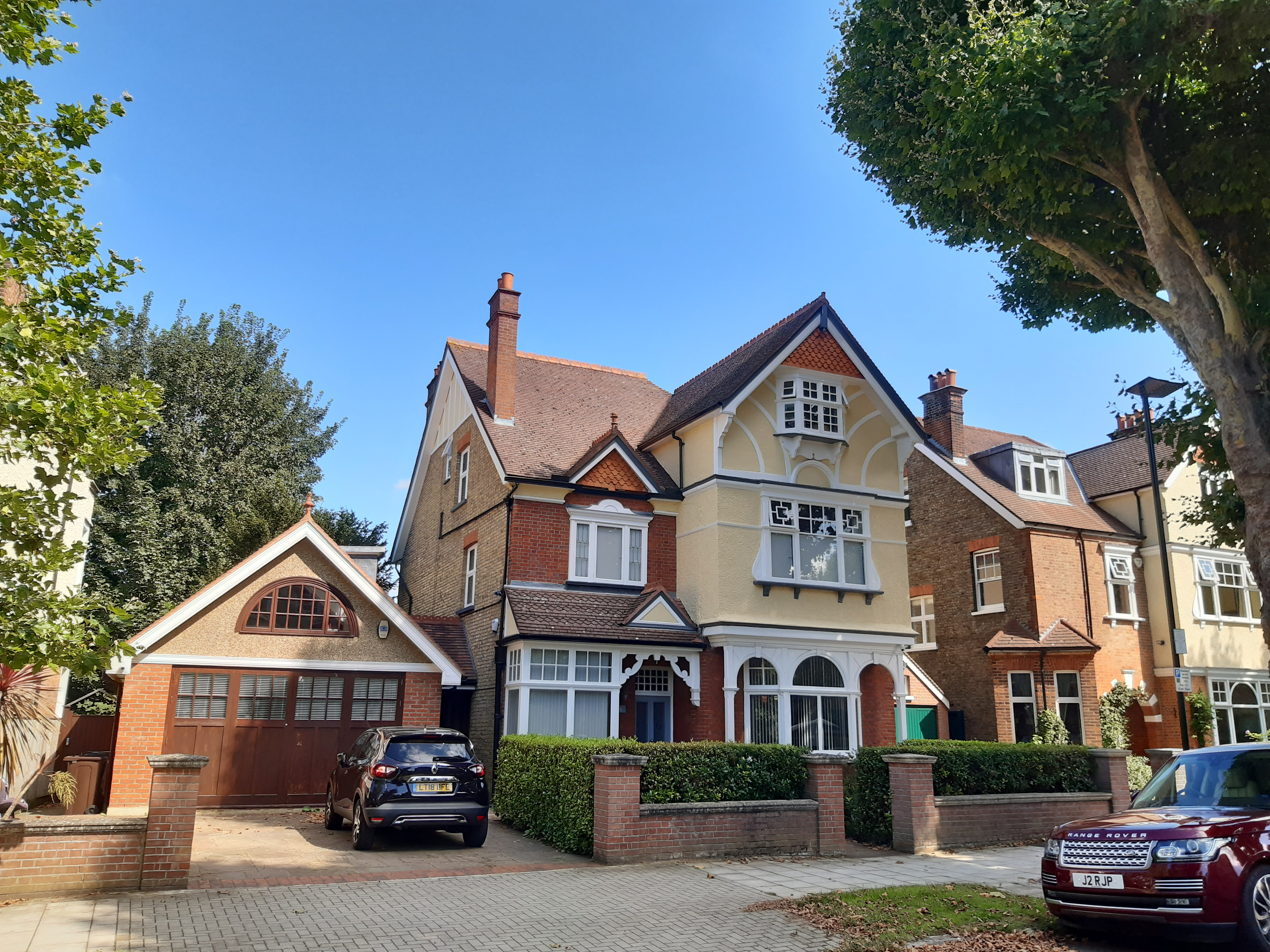
Queen Anne Revival style, Spencer Road, c. 1890

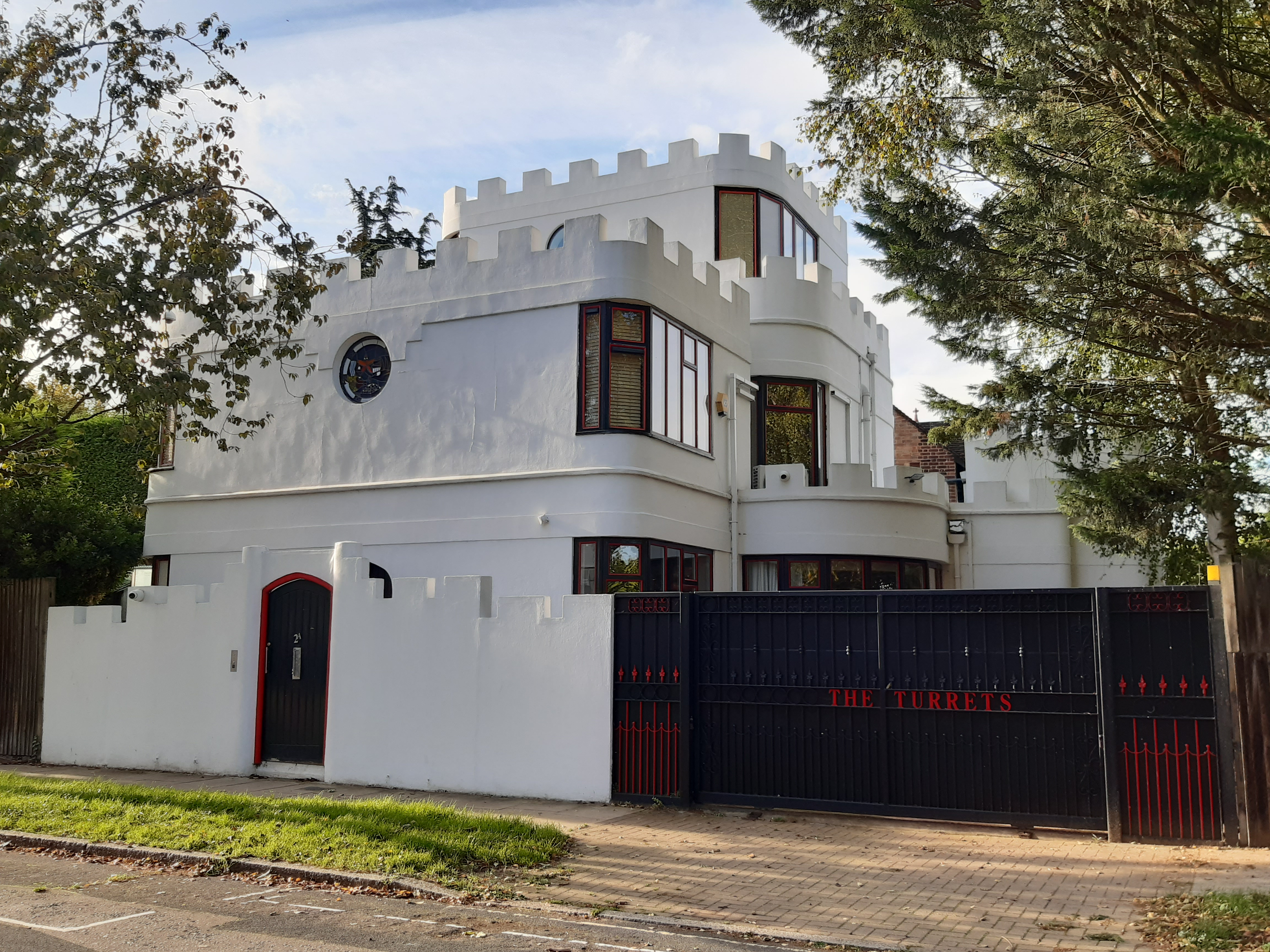
The Turrets, a castellated house, 20th century

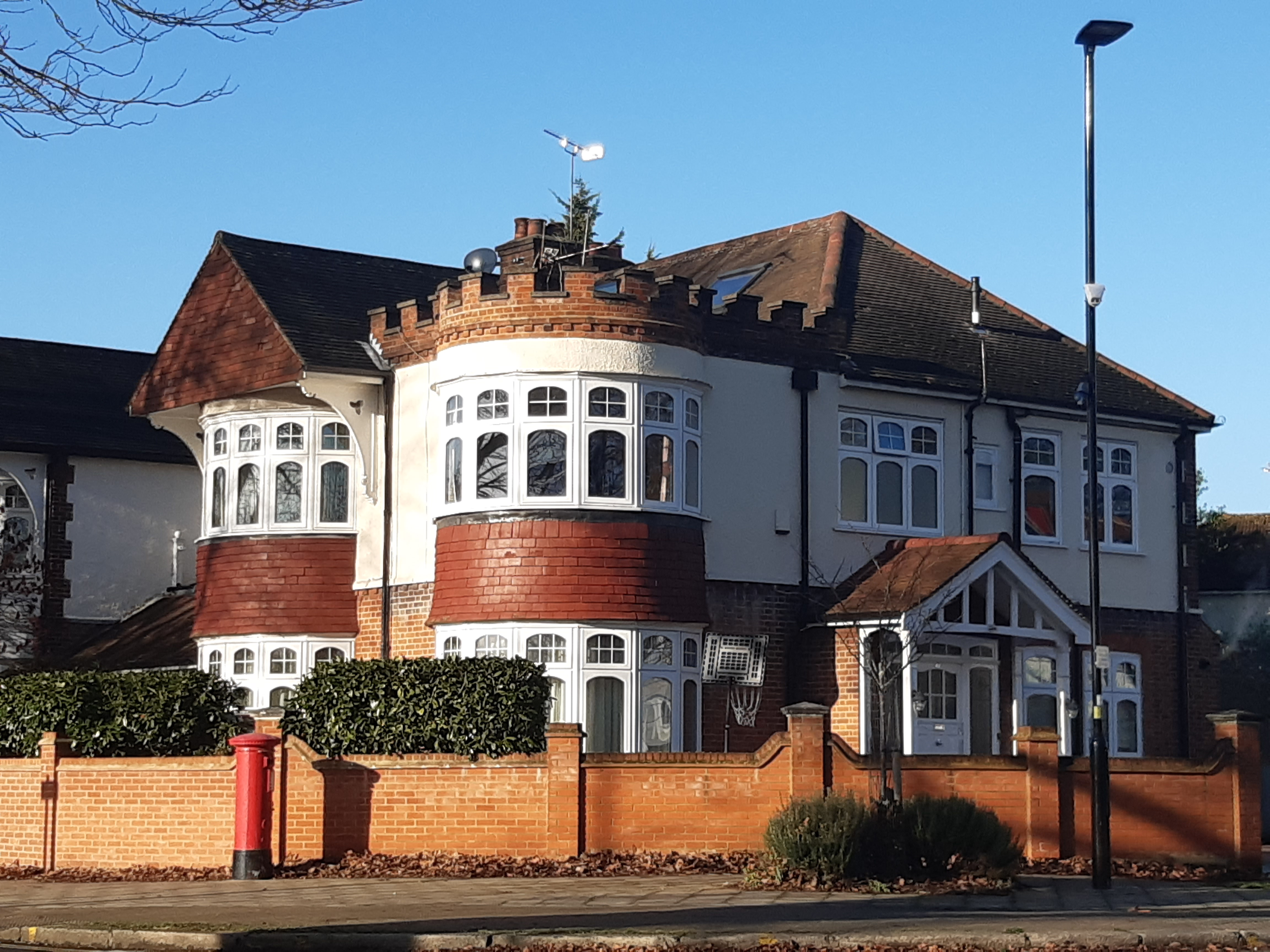
Corner house with round castellated tower, 20th century

=== V-2 rocket strike ===
On Friday 8 September 1944, during the Second World War, a V-2 rocket launched from Wassenaar in Holland, by 485 Artillerie Abteilung at 6.37pm, landed in Staveley Road near the junction with Burlington Lane, killing three people (including a three-year-old girl), and injuring nineteen. The crater was thirty feet across. It was the first successful V-2 rocket strike in Britain. The explosion was shown in ZDF's 2015 production Hitler's Space Rocket, and in the 1965 film Operation Crossbow. A granite memorial stone was placed near the site on Staveley Road in 2004.

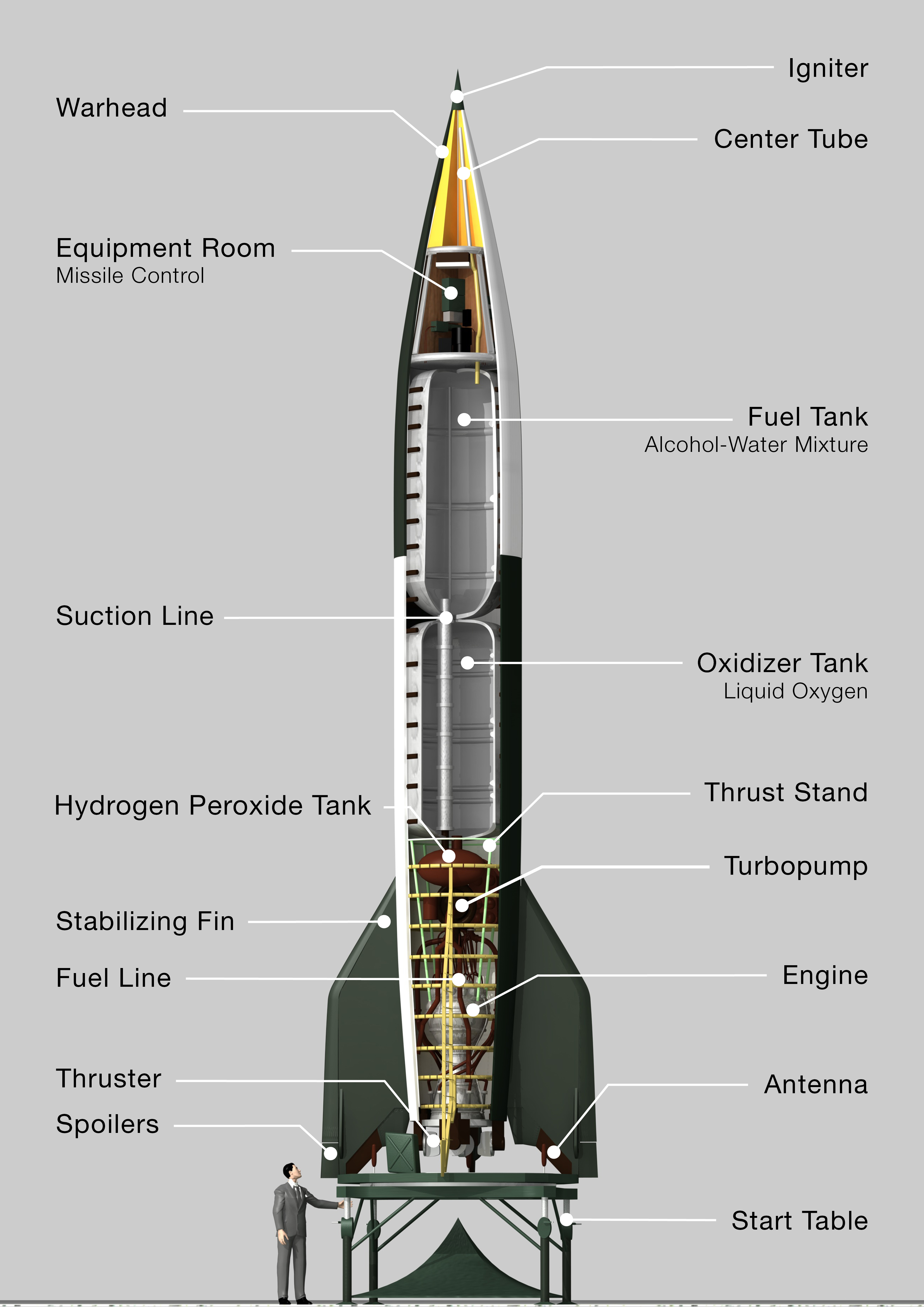
V-2 rocket

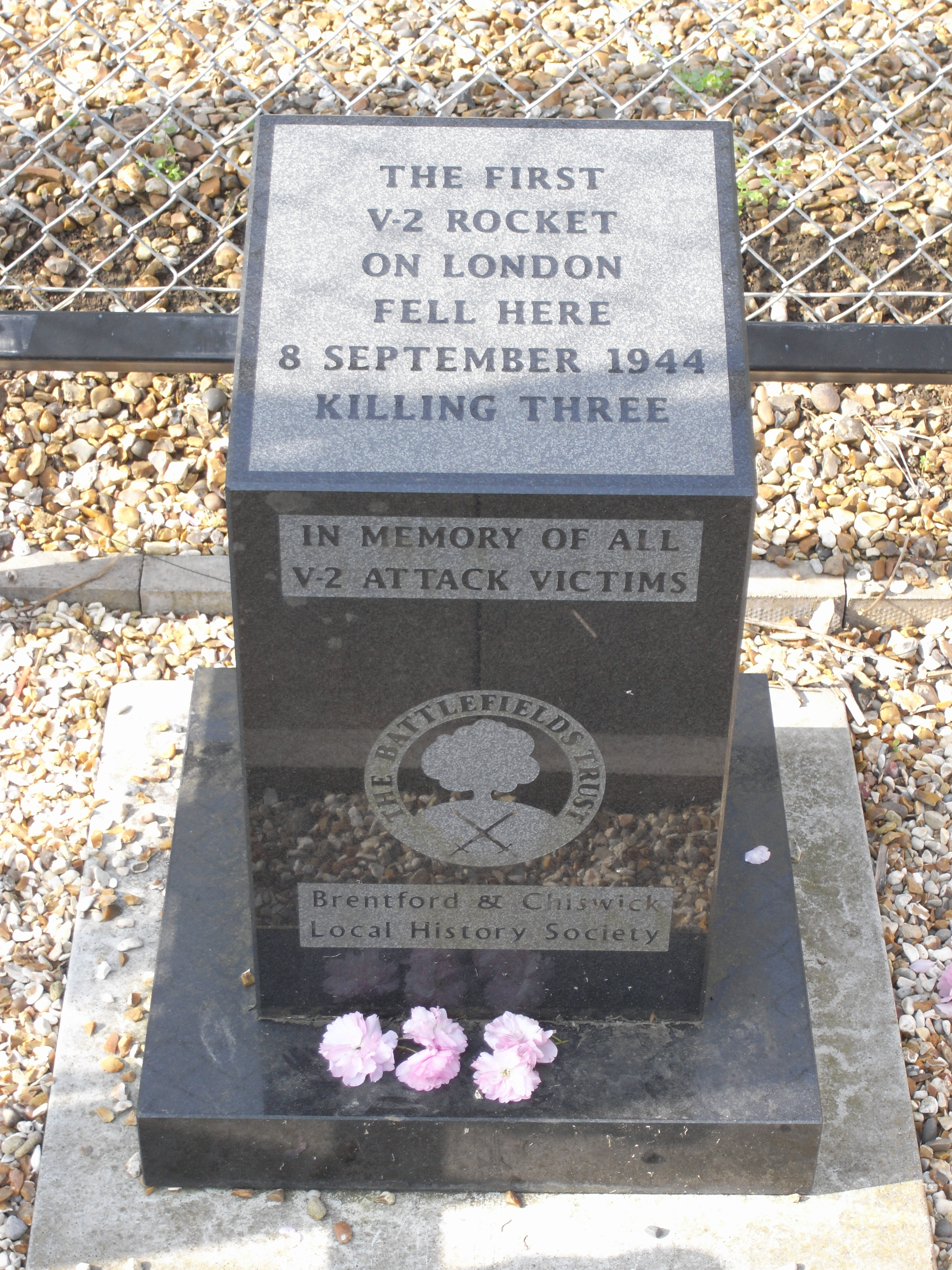
Memorial to the September 1944 V-2 explosion in Staveley Road, built in September 2004

== Churches ==
=== St Paul's Church ===
The neo-Gothic St Paul's Church, Grove Park Road, was designed in 1872 by Henry Currey and built at the expense of William Cavendish, 7th Duke of Devonshire to provide a church for the newly built Grove Park estate. It is made of irregular blocks of stone and has an apse at its eastern end; there is no tower or tall spire. It has instead a fleche (a small spire) atop a mock belfry at the western end. Inside, the church has a high altar from St Margaret's, Birmingham, to a design by Lord Norton, and a large 16th-century Florentine painting of the transfiguration of Christ. The stained glass in the apse is modern, by M. E. Aldrich Rope (1891-1988). The Stations of the Cross were painted by Enid Chadwick (1902–1987) of Walsingham, a British artist known for religious art.

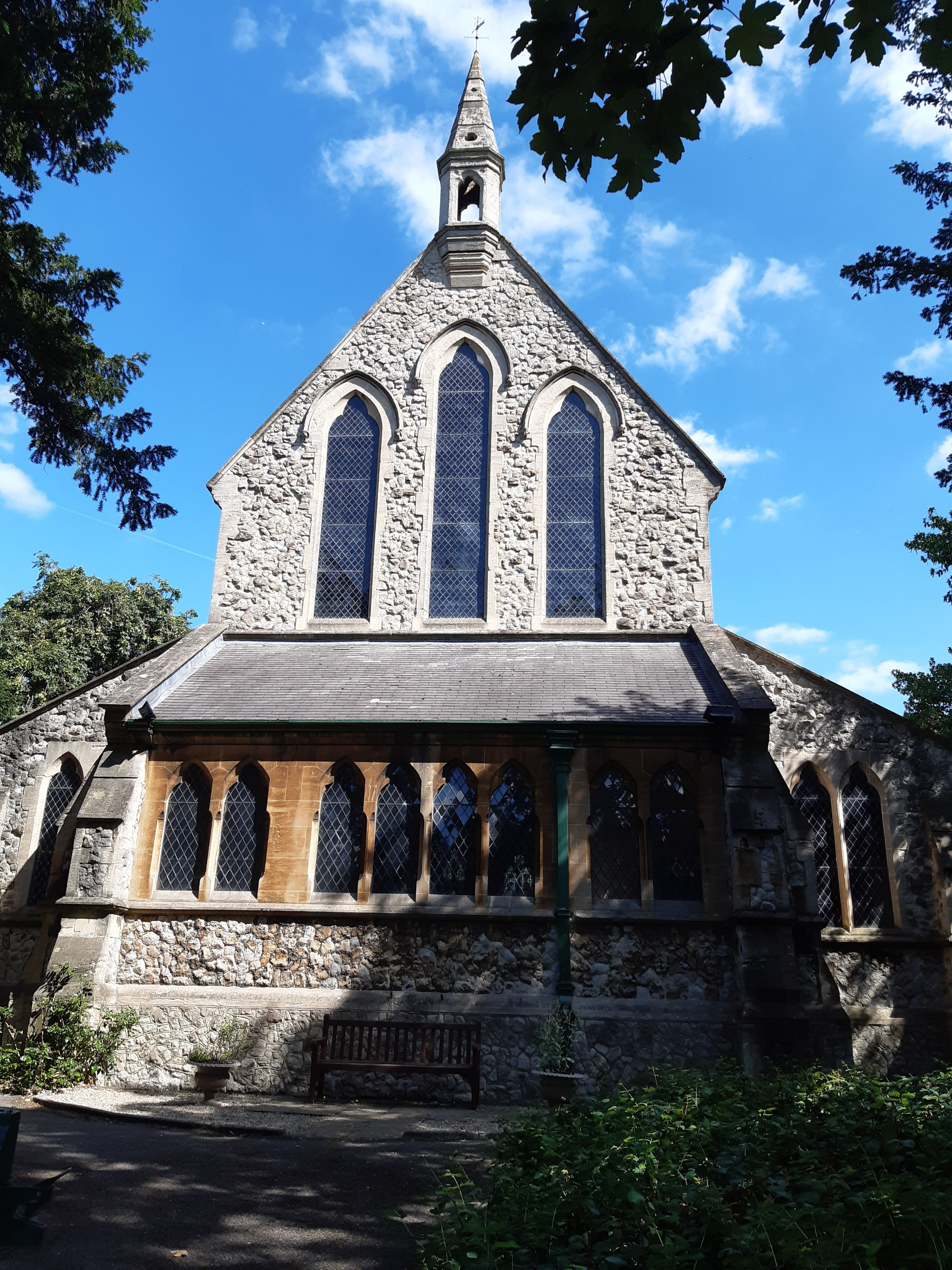
St Paul's Church, Grove Park

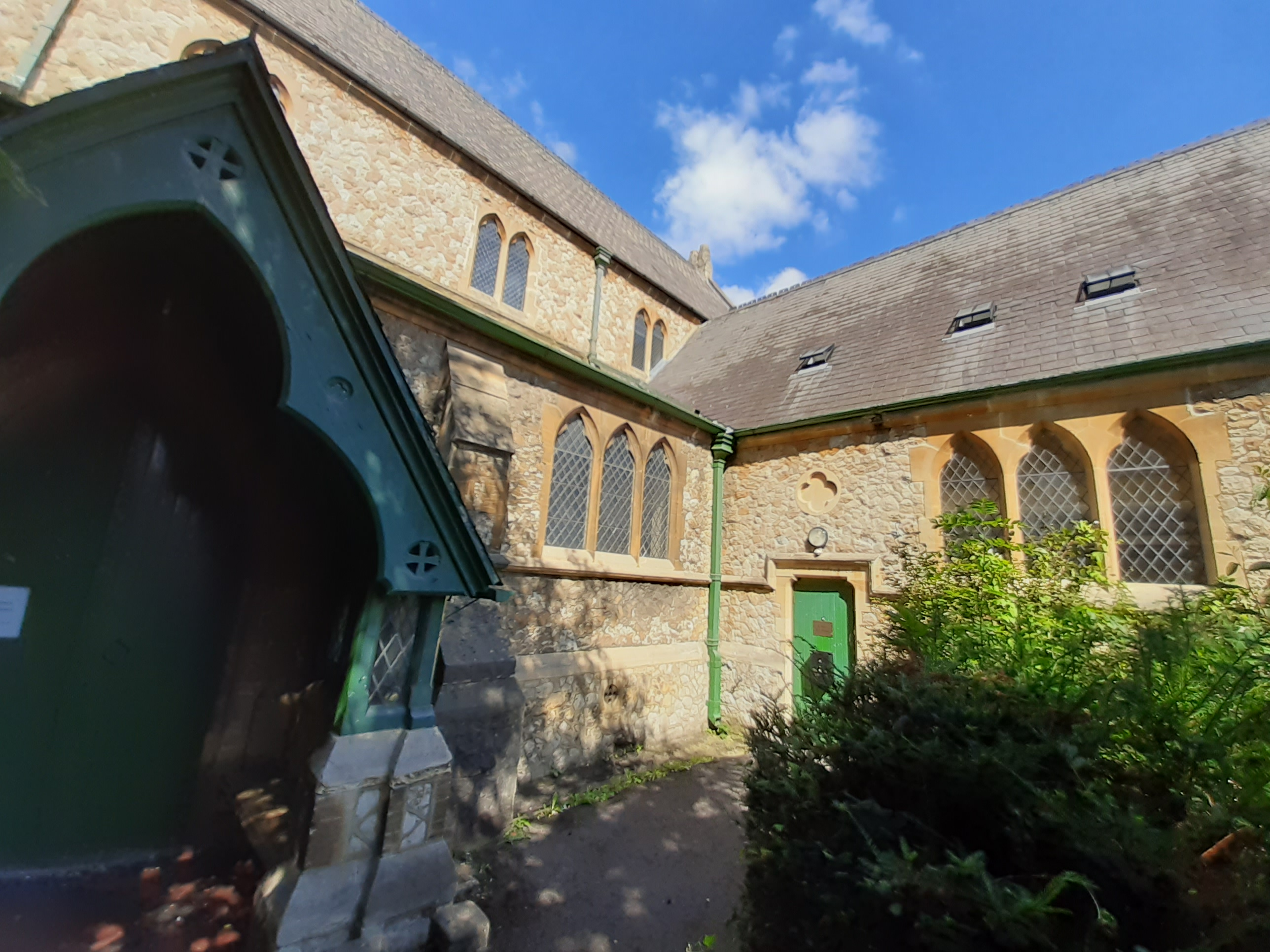
Main entrance

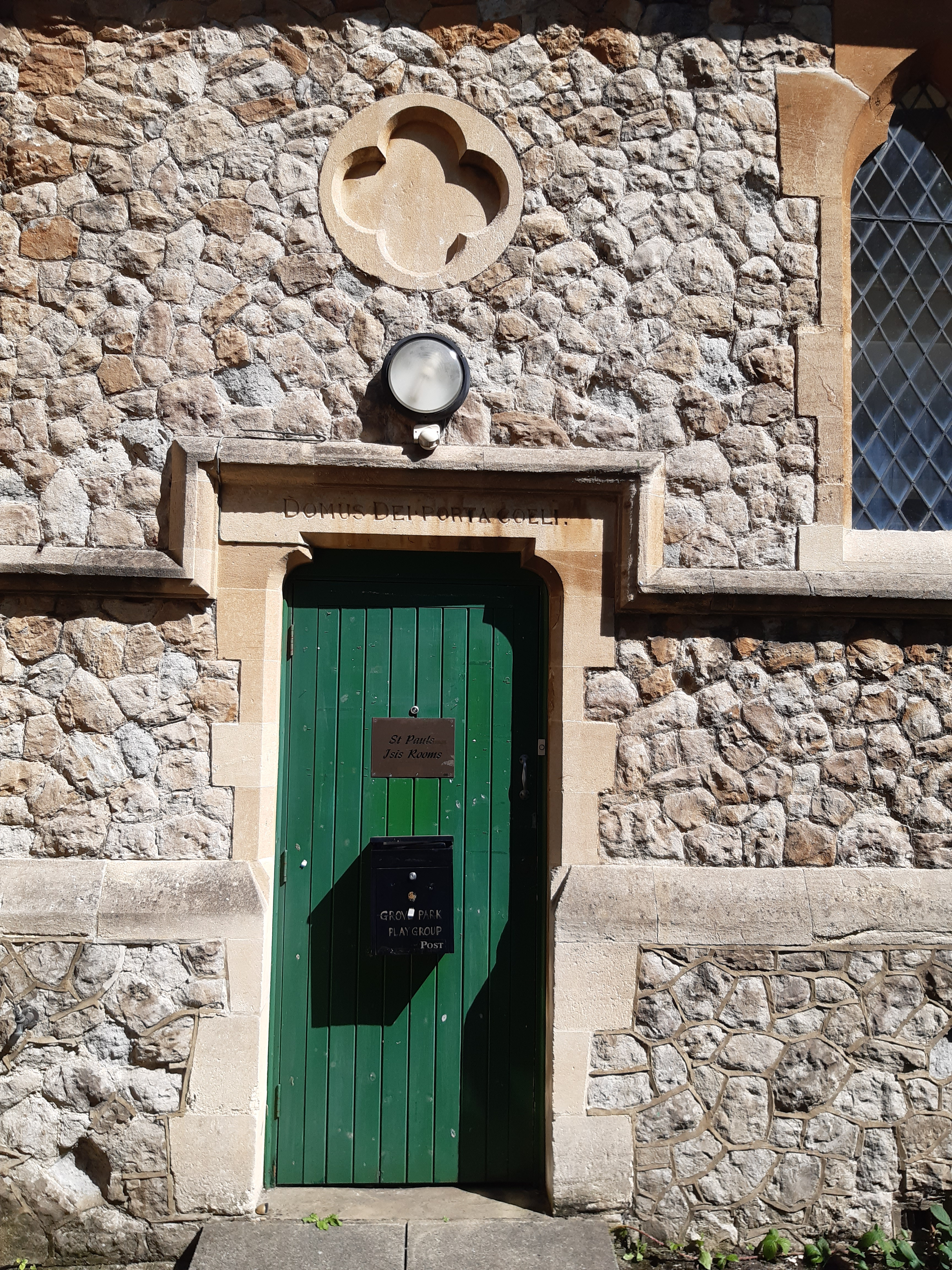
Doorway Domus Dei Porta Coeli ("House of God, Gate of Heaven")

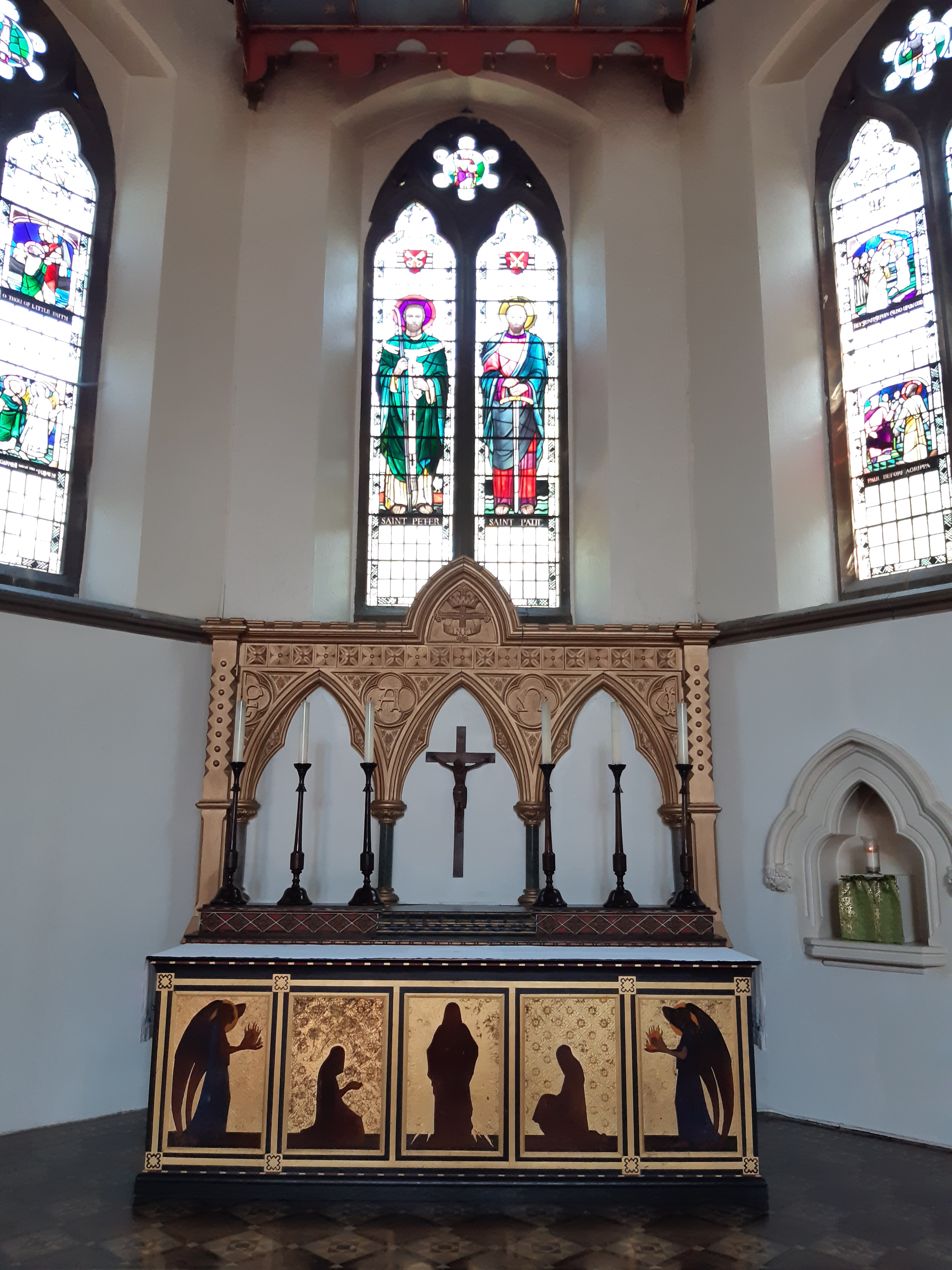
Altar and stained glass

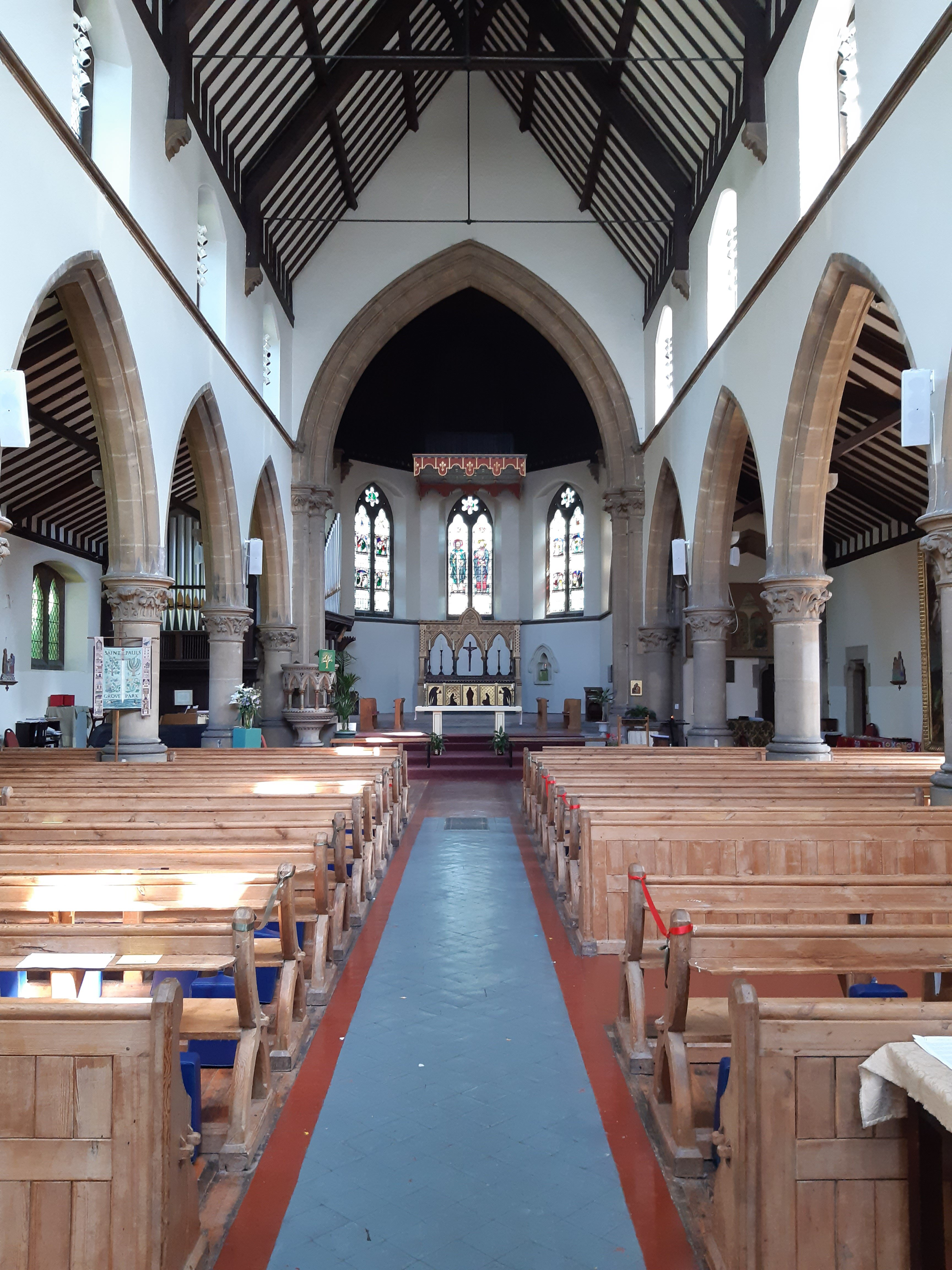
Nave

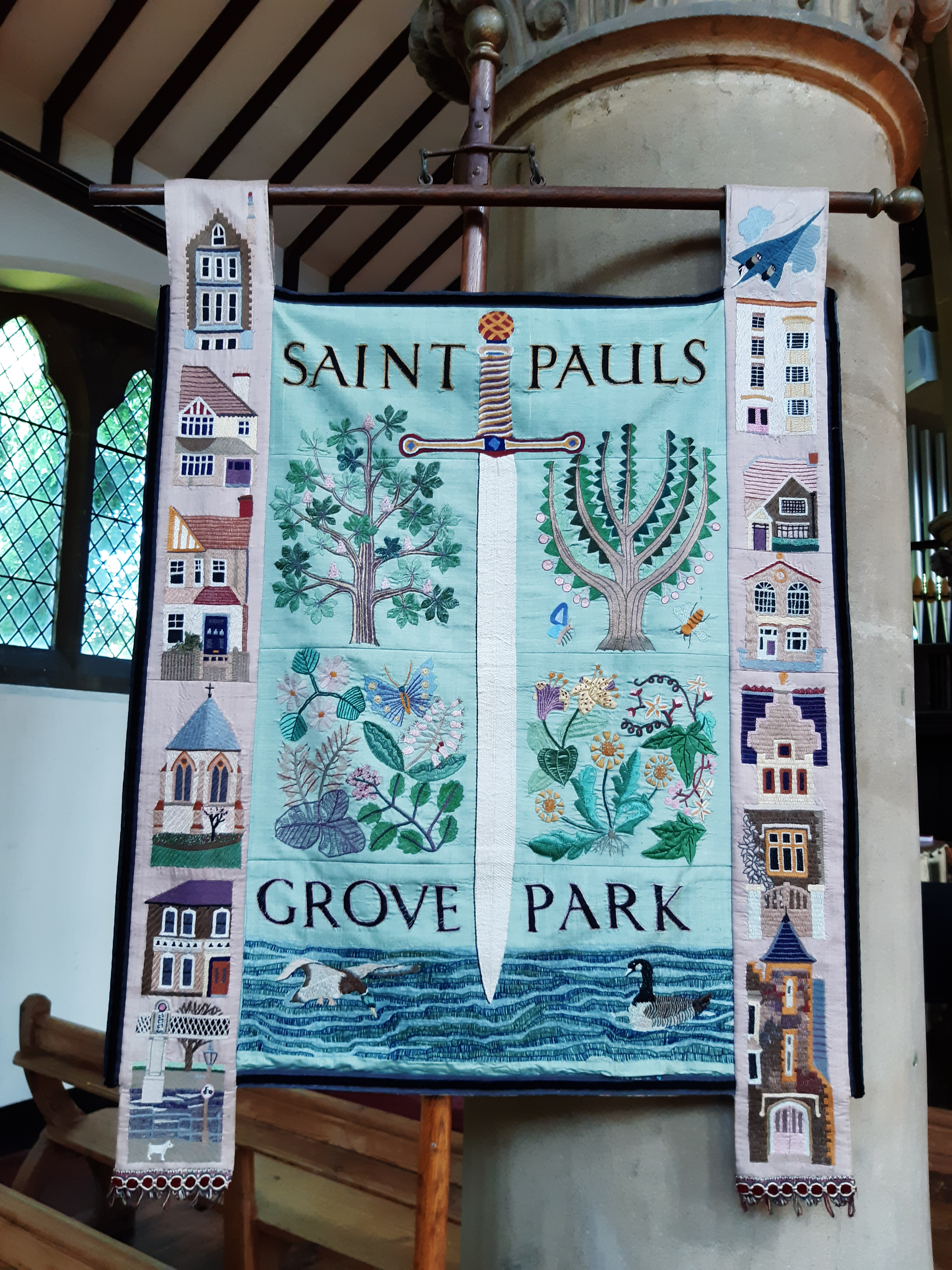
Banner

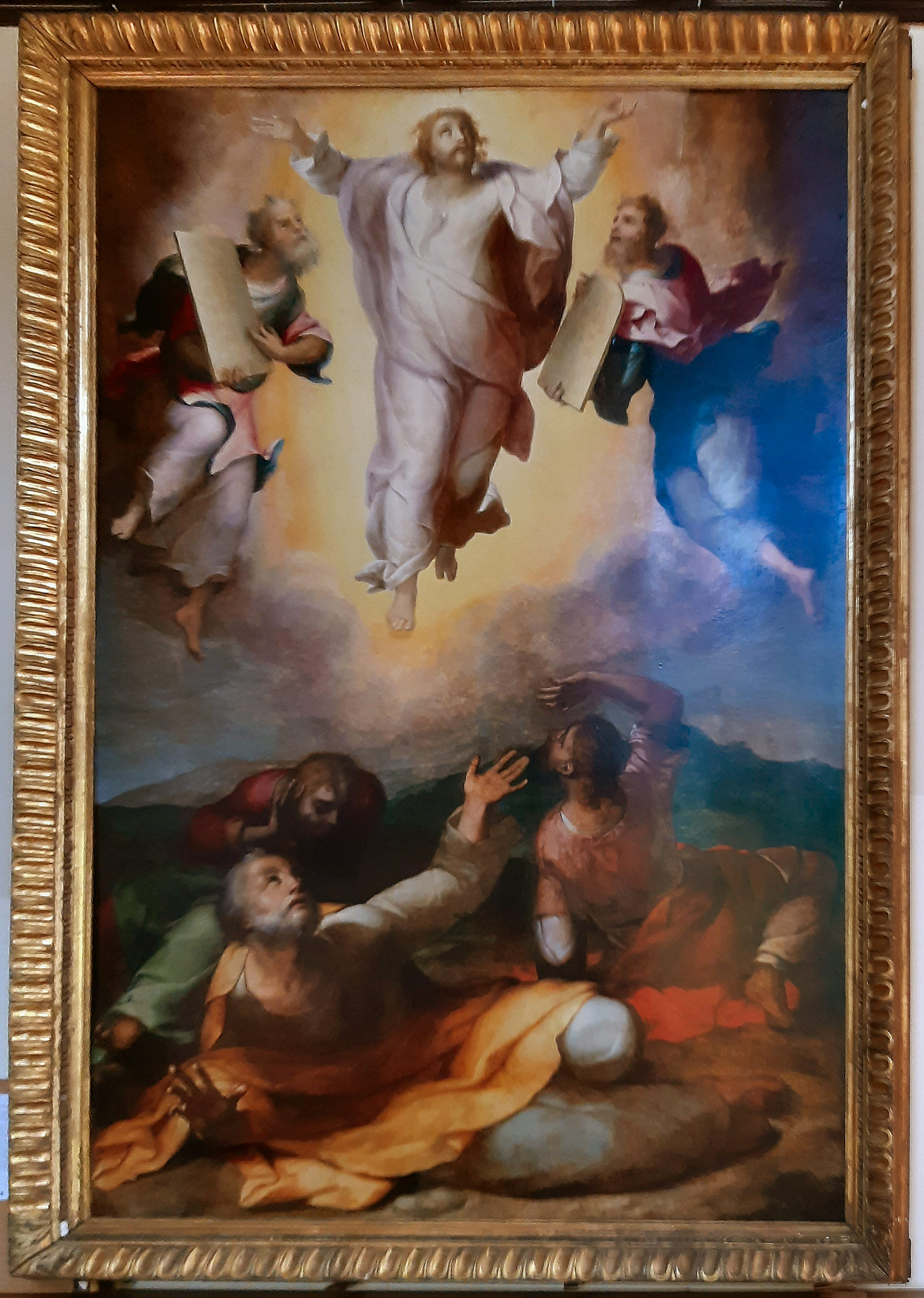
The Transfiguration, after Raphael, late 16th century

=== St Michael's Church ===
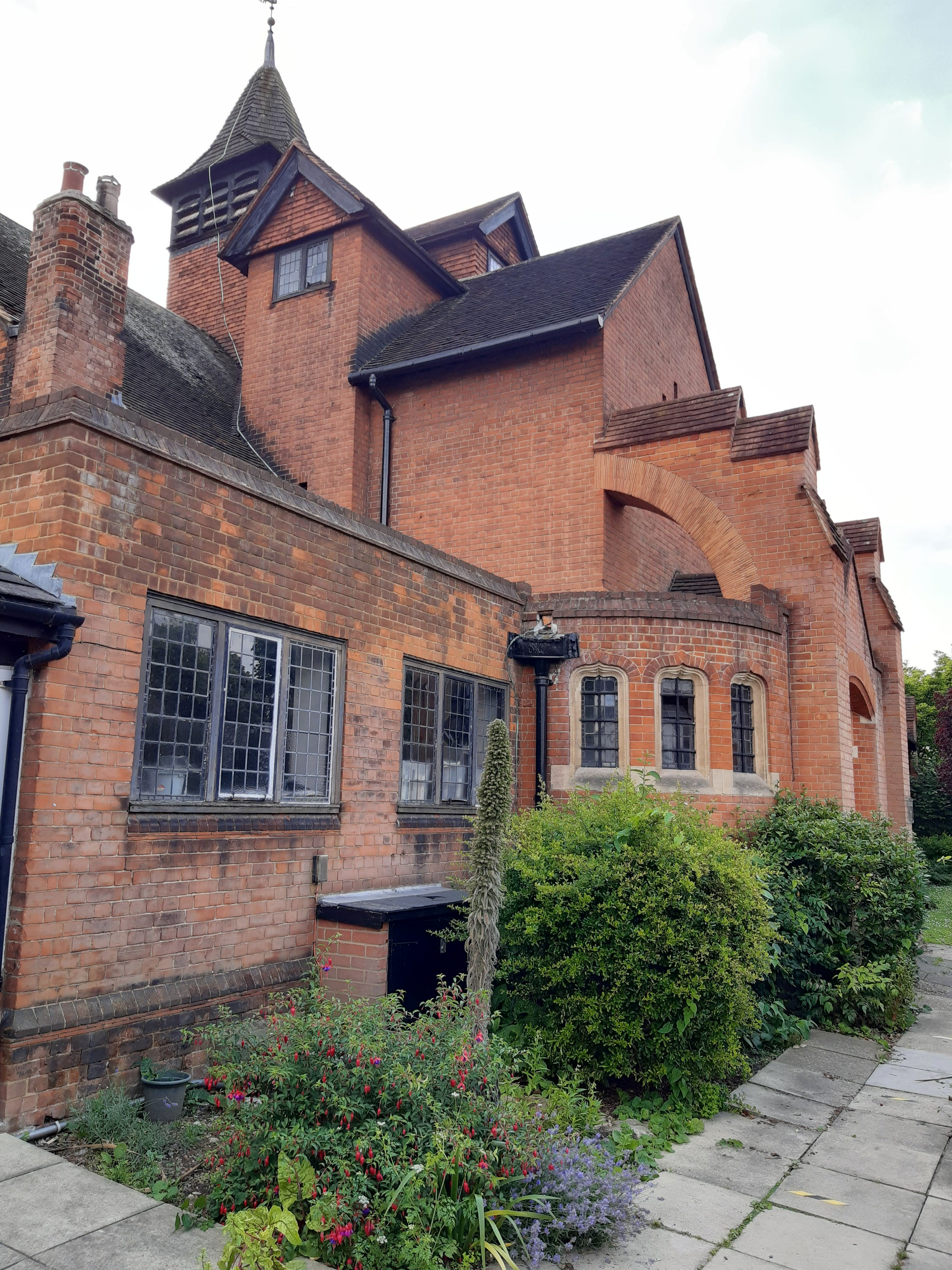
St Michael's Church

St Michael's Church on Elmwood Road was designed by the architects W. D. Caröe & Herbert Passmore; it was founded in 1908 and completed in 1909. It is described by Nikolaus Pevsner in The Buildings of England as "one of Caröe's most interesting churches in outer London". The building was funded by the sale of St Michael, Burleigh Street, on the Strand (in central London). Pevsner calls the exterior "picturesque"; it is in red brick, its buttresses joined by tiled arches, and with dormers in the roof. The crossing point of the roof is marked by a turret with shingles and tiles; on the north of the crossing is "a curiously domestic excrescence" for ventilation and the church's belfry. The windows have decorative curving stone tracery in "free flamboyant Gothic" style; they are recessed under tiled arches. Inside, the font, lectern, and pulpit were brought from St Michael on the Strand, while the 1911 choir stalls were designed by Caröe. The south chapel's roof has a decoration made by Antony Lloyd in 1932. The stained glass windows in the south chapel and the sanctuary were made by Horace Wilkinson between 1914 and 1925.

== Parks and nature reserves ==
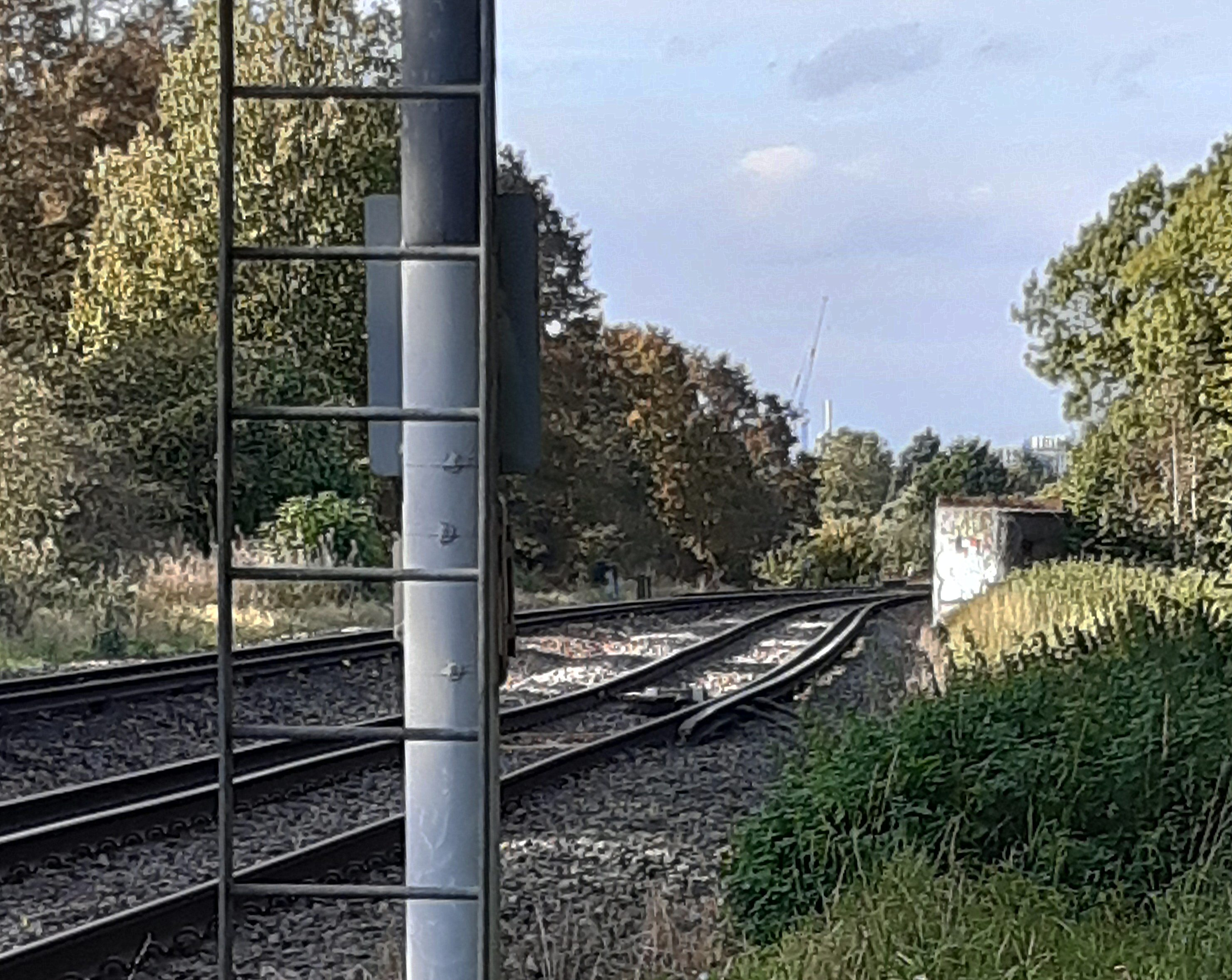
Second World War Blockhouse near Barnes Railway Bridge

Just to the east of the Grove Park area is Chiswick House, its gardens a public park. In the south of the peninsula is the open space of Duke's Meadows, though much of its area is now taken up with private sports grounds and allotments. Just beside the railway bridge is the small Duke's Hollow nature reserve, which is allowed to flood at high spring tides.

In the First World War, a pleasure lake that had belonged to Grove House, at the southern end of Hartington Road, was turned into Cubitt's Yacht Basin; during the war it made cast concrete barges to carry ammunition. When the war ended it was used to moor houseboats.

== Residents ==
The actor John Thaw lived on Grove Park Road for many years, while the British Army Field Marshal Bernard Montgomery, 1st Viscount Montgomery of Alamein, lived on Bolton Road as a teenager. The poet Dylan Thomas lived in the vicarage of St Paul's Church in the 1940s.

== In culture ==
St Paul's vicarage was used in the 2011 film Tinker Tailor Soldier Spy of John Le Carre's novel, as was the BBC drama series Killing Eve, and the television detective series Lewis and Grantchester. The vicarage's garden was used "extensively" in the 2014 film about the physicist Stephen Hawking, The Theory of Everything. The Beatles filmed two short promotional films on 20 May 1966, Paperback Writer and Rain, in the gardens of Chiswick House.

== Sources ==
- Baker, T. F. T.; et al. (1982). "Chiswick: Growth". A History of the County of Middlesex: Volume 7: Acton, Chiswick, Ealing and Brentford, West Twyford, Willesden. British History Online.
- Cherry, Bridget; Pevsner, Nikolaus (1991). The Buildings of England. London 3: North West. London: Penguin Books. ISBN 978-0-14-071048-9. OCLC 24722942.
- Clegg, Gillian (1995). Chiswick Past. Historical Publications. ISBN 0-94866-733-8.
