= Grove City =

Grove City is the name of several places in the United States of America:

- Grove City, Florida
- Grove City, Illinois
- Grove City, Minnesota
- Grove City, Ohio
- Grove City, Pennsylvania
  - Grove City College
