= Grove High School (disambiguation) =

Grove High School may refer to:

== U.S states A–K ==
- Beech Grove High School in Indiana
- Boone Grove High School in Indiana
- Buffalo Grove High School in Illinois
- Cary-Grove High School in Illinois
- Council Grove High School in Kansas
- Downers Grove North High School in Illinois
- Eagle Grove High School in Iowa
- Garden Grove High School in California
- Pacific Grove High School in California
- Prairie Grove High School in Arkansas
- The Grove School in California
- Union Grove High School in Georgia
- Walden Grove High School in Arizona
- Western Grove High School in Arkansas

== U.S. states M–Z ==
- Avon Grove High School in Pennsylvania
- Blooming Grove High School in Texas
- Cedar Grove-Belgium High School in Wisconsin
- Coal Grove High School in Ohio
- Columbus Grove High School in Ohio
- Cottage Grove High School in Oregon
- Fair Grove High School in Missouri
- Forest Grove High School in Oregon
- Grove City High School in Ohio
- Grove High School in Oklahoma
- Howards Grove High School in Wisconsin
- Lone Grove High School in Oklahoma
- Maple Grove Junior High School in Minnesota
- Maple Grove Senior High School in Minnesota
- Monona Grove High School in Wisconsin
- Penns Grove High School in New Jersey

== Elsewhere ==
- Golden Grove High School in South Australia
- Hazel Grove High School in England
- King's Grove High School in England
- Lynn Grove High School in England
- Walnut Grove Secondary School in British Columbia, Canada

== See also ==
- Grove School (disambiguation)
- Groves High School (disambiguation)
