= The Grove Resort & Water Park =

Resort in Orlando, Florida, United States

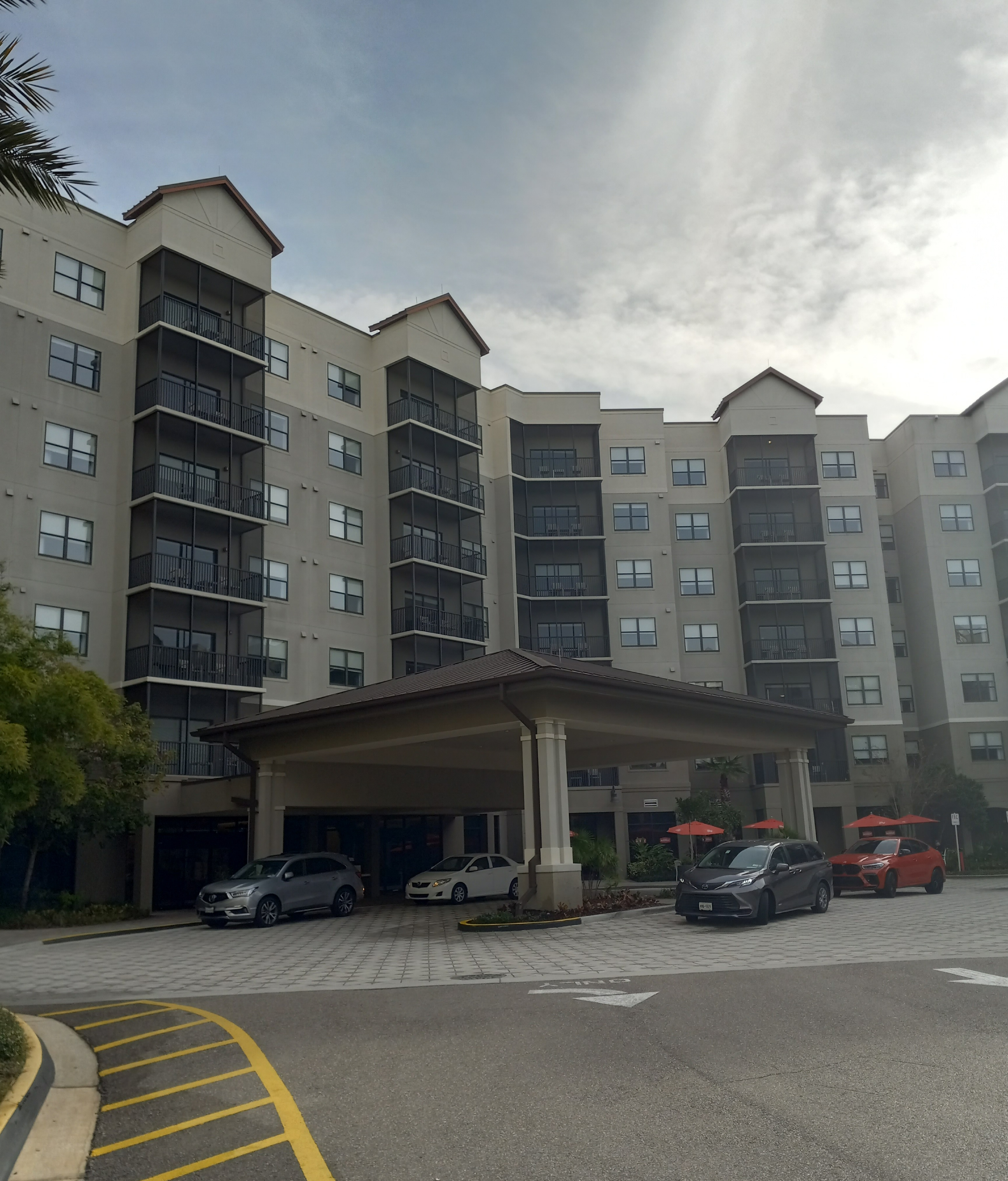
- The Grove Resort lobby entrance
- Interactive map of the The Grove Resort & Water Park area

General information
- Status: Open
- Location: 14501 Grove Resort Avenue, Winter Garden, Florida, United States
- Coordinates: 28°21′41″N 81°39′6″W
- Completed: 2008 (vacant hotel); 2019 (renovations)
- Opened: 2017 (first tower)
- Owner: BTI Partners

Technical details
- Floor count: 7

Other information
- Number of rooms: 878 (non-residential); 160 (planned condos)
- Number of restaurants: 4

The Grove Resort & Water Park (also known as The Grove Resort or simply The Grove) is a resort and water park in Winter Garden, Florida, United States, located west of the Walt Disney World Resort near Orlando. The resort property features the Surfari Water Park, multiple restaurants, a grocery market, a spa, and an amusement arcade.

== History ==
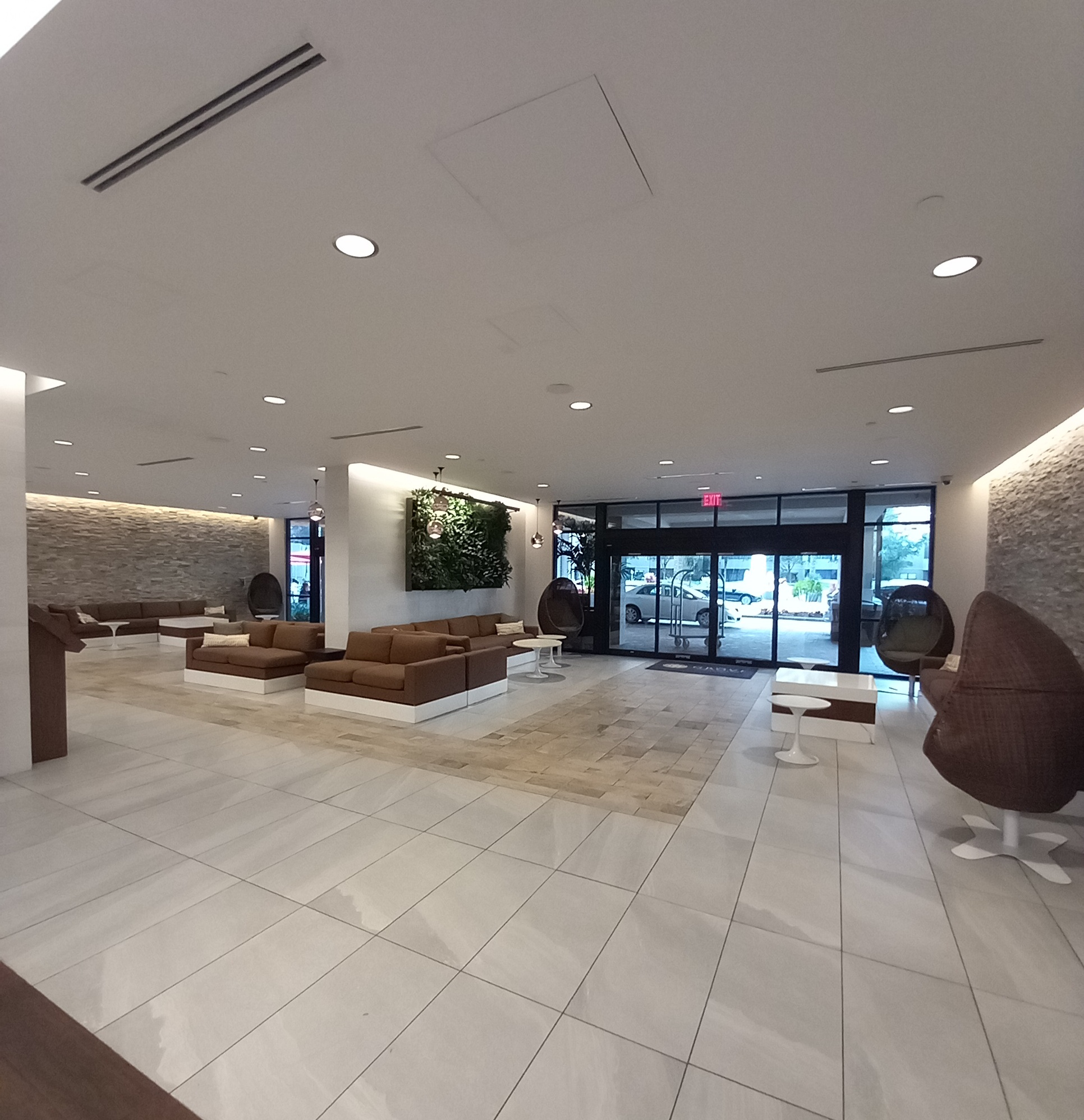
The Grove Resort lobby

The Grove Resort property was originally developed as the Grand Palisades timeshare, completed and foreclosed for $150 million in 2008 during the Great Recession. The building remained vacant since then and was sold to Fort Lauderdale-based company BTI Partners and Wilton, Connecticut-based Westport Capital Partners LLC in October 2014 for $69 million. $200 million renovations, which included the removal of dated late-2000s furniture, carpets, and colors, began in April 2016. The first tower, the Premier Tower, completed renovations in February 2017, with the opening of 184 of the resort's 878 rooms, a pool area, the Escape spa, a lounge, and the Element and Zest restaurants, and the Alfresco Market and Valencia restaurant opening soon after.

The Marquis Tower, Surfari Water Park, and Flip Flop's Family Fun Center opened in 2018 and the third and final Sterling Tower opened in November 2019.

At northern end of the resort property, development on The Terraces vacation homes began in the summer of 2020. The phase will add 160 vacation homes and will be completed in 2022.

== Surfari Water Park ==
The Surfari Water Park, which was opened in early 2018 as a $20 million investment, includes a FlowRider surfing simulator, a 700-foot (210 m) lazy river, dual water slides, a family swimming pool, and the Longboard Bar & Grill.
