= The Grove School =

Location
- 11126 Iowa Street (Farm- Junior High School Campus), 200 Nevada Street (High School Campus); Redlands, California; United States

Information
- School type: Charter School, Secondary
- Established: 1999 (High School), 2003 (Farm-Middle School)
- School district: Redlands Unified School District
- Head of school: Michelle Sweezey
- Staff: 12.75 (FTE)
- Grades: 7-12
- Enrollment: 246 (2022-23)
- Student to teacher ratio: 19.30
- Colors: Green, Black, and Silver
- Mascot: Raven

The Grove School is a Montessori-based public charter school located in Redlands, California, United States. The school serves grades 7–12 on two campuses. Based on Montessori theory and practice, the Grove School accepts children from families in the Redlands School District, and those in surrounding communities.

== School structure and campuses ==
The Grove School was founded in 1999. The high school (grades ten to twelve) sits on the campus of Montessori in Redlands. The Farm or middle school campus (grades 7–9) was founded in 2003 and is a working farm, run by students. The classrooms are housed in the old farmhouse and associated outbuildings.

The land, part of the Heritage Park Historical District in Redlands, includes facilities for small livestock and basic agricultural crops.

The Farm campus includes historic Barton School House. Built in 1901, it is one of the oldest buildings in Redlands.

It was moved from its original location, Alabama Street, to Heritage Park on the Farm School campus.

Ninth grade farm students are slowly incorporated into the high school community over the course of the year.

== Academics ==
The Grove School follows the Montessori philosophy that students learn best by "doing."

The Grove is a California Distinguished School.

== Athletics ==
The Grove School offers multiple sports to both middle school and high school students. Grove is a member of CIF-SS and competes in multiple leagues.

Leagues

- Majestic League
- Inland Coast League (Boys Volleyball)
- Victory League (Varsity Soccer)
- Mountain Valley League (Middle School)

High School teams (9-12)

- Baseball
- Basketball (Boys)
- Cross Country (Boys)
- Cross Country (Girls)
- Soccer (Boys/Co-ed)
- Softball
- Volleyball (Girls)
- Volleyball (Boys)

Middle School teams (7-8)

- Volleyball (Girls)
- Soccer (Co-ed)
- Cross Country (Boys)
- Cross Country (Girls)
- Basketball (Boys)
