= Groove 101.7FM =

Coordinates: 31°58′49″S 115°54′01″E

Australia
- Broadcast area: Perth, Western Australia
- Frequency: 101.7 MHz FM

Programming
- Language: English
- Format: Urban music House music

Ownership
- Owner: Youth Media Society of Western Australia

History
- First air date: 1 March 2003
- Last air date: 10 March 2008
- Call sign meaning: 6 - Western Australia; Youth Media Society

Technical information
- ERP: 56 kW

Links
- Website: www.groove.com.au

Groove 101.7FM (call sign: 6YMS) was a Western Australian community radio station broadcasting from studios located in Carlisle, owned and operated by the Youth Media Society of Western Australia. Its first broadcast was in March 2003, with the station closing in March 2008 after its broadcasting licence was not renewed.

== History ==
Groove 101.7FM was first broadcast in July 2002 as a 12-hour service, broadcasting to the Perth area on 101.7FM between; the frequency shared with Capital Community Radio. The station, with its youth format, was in October 2002 awarded a full-time licence by the Australian Broadcasting Authority, beginning 24-hour transmissions on 1 March 2003. As Youth Media Society of Western Australia, the station offered a subscription program, encouraging members from the community served by the station to offer financial support through sponsorship and to be part of the decision making processes, by election to the Committee of Management and appointment to the Sub-Committees.

In September 2003, the Australian Broadcasting Authority launched an investigation into the station, following a complaint from DMG Radio Australia, the parent company of commercial radio station Nova 93.7, citing possible breaches of the Broadcasting Services Act 1992 and the Community Broadcasting Association of Australia's Code of Practice. Before the investigation was handed down, in July 2004, the authority was informed that the station's Chief Executive and President, and the Secretary "will no longer be associated with Groove FM". In handing down the report, the authority found the station "does not continue to represent the community interest that it represented at the time when the licence was allocated to it" and "does not encourage members of the community that it serves to participate in the operations of the licensee". In response, additional licence conditions were imposed on the service, regarding corporate governance, Australian music and talk content, and compliance with the Broadcasting Services Act and the Community Broadcasting Codes of Practice. In December, a settlement was made between the licensee and the Australian Communications & Media Authority, following an Administrative Appeals Tribunal review was sought by the station.

In September 2006, the station was investigated by the Australian Communications & Media Authority (ACMA), following a complaint that suggested a breach in licence conditions relating to Australian music content, talk programming and on-air promotion of participation in the organisation. No further action was taken, despite the breaches of various codes. However, in February 2008, the ACMA announced that the station's licence would not be renewed. Groove 101.7FM was shut down on 10 March 2008.

The 101.7 FM frequency is currently occupied by seniors community broadcaster Capital 101.7FM.
