= Duke's Hollow =

UK nature reserve

Coordinates: 51.473164°N 0.25526172°W

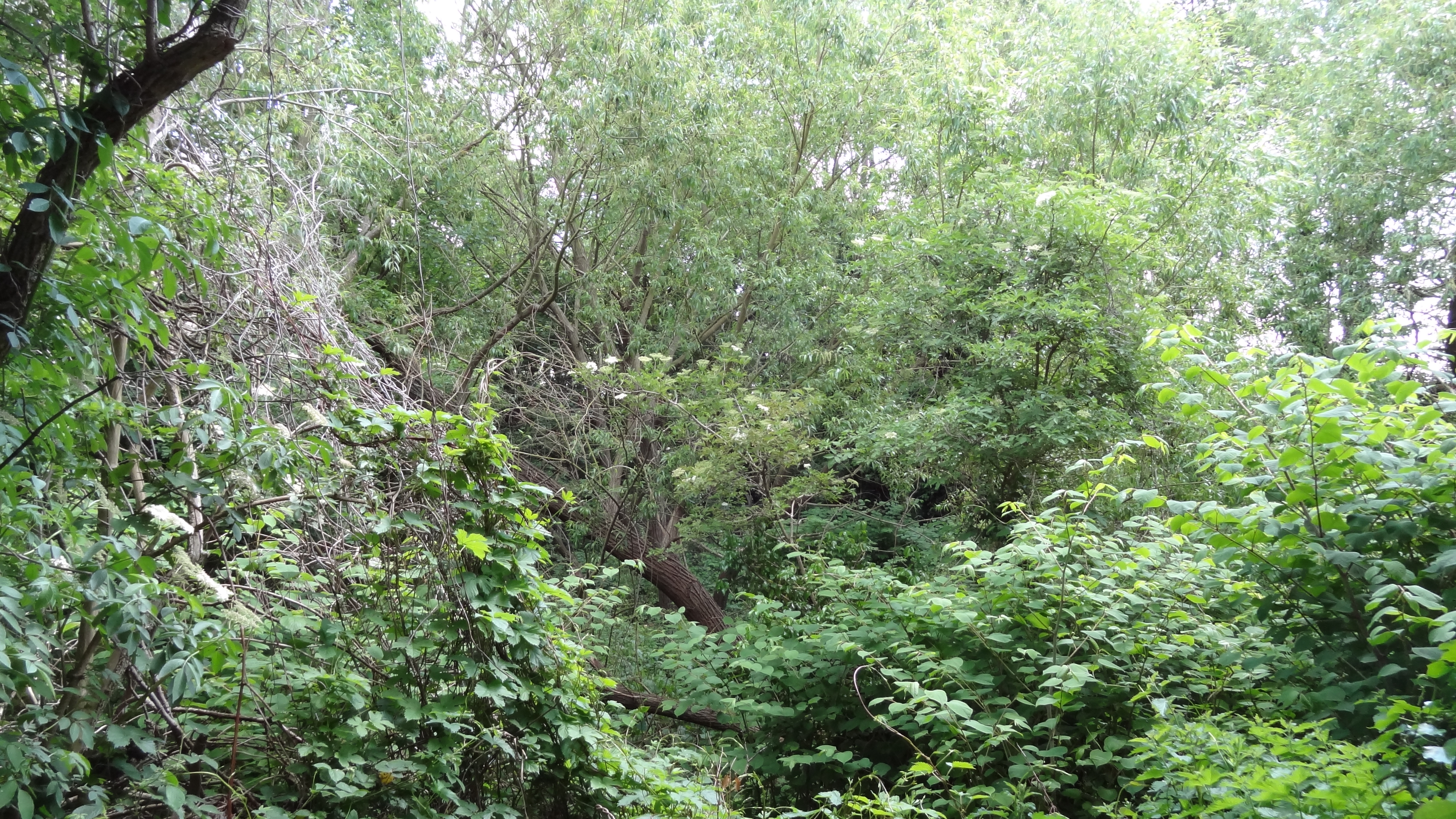
Duke's Hollow in 2014

Duke's Hollow is a 0.27-hectare Local Nature Reserve and Site of Metropolitan Importance for Nature Conservation in Chiswick in the London Borough of Hounslow. It is owned and managed by Hounslow Council.

The reserve is a steeply sloping site down towards the River Thames east of Barnes Railway Bridge, with access from Dan Mason Drive.

== See also ==
- Dukes Meadows Footbridge
