= Dukes Meadows =

Riverside park in Chiswick, London

Coordinates: 51.4752°N 0.2617°W

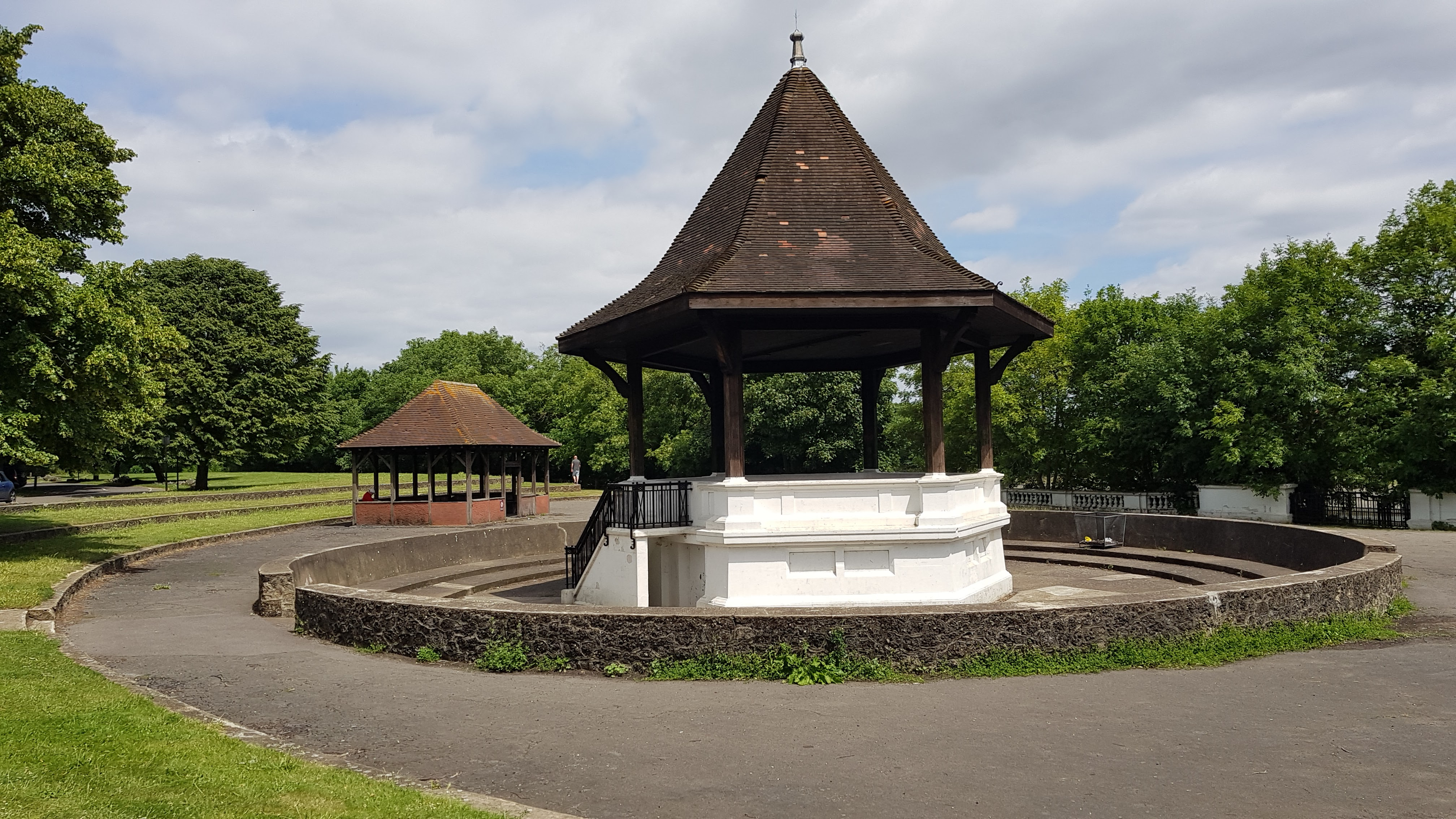
Bandstand in Dukes Meadows, with mature trees along the riverside

Dukes Meadows is a riverside park on metropolitan open land in Chiswick, London. The land was bought by the council in 1923, and the park was opened in 1926. It is cared for by the Dukes Meadows Trust. The area is home to the Chiswick Farmers' Market, which helps to pay for the park's maintenance. From 2023 the Dukes Meadows Footbridge forms part of the Thames Path.

== History ==
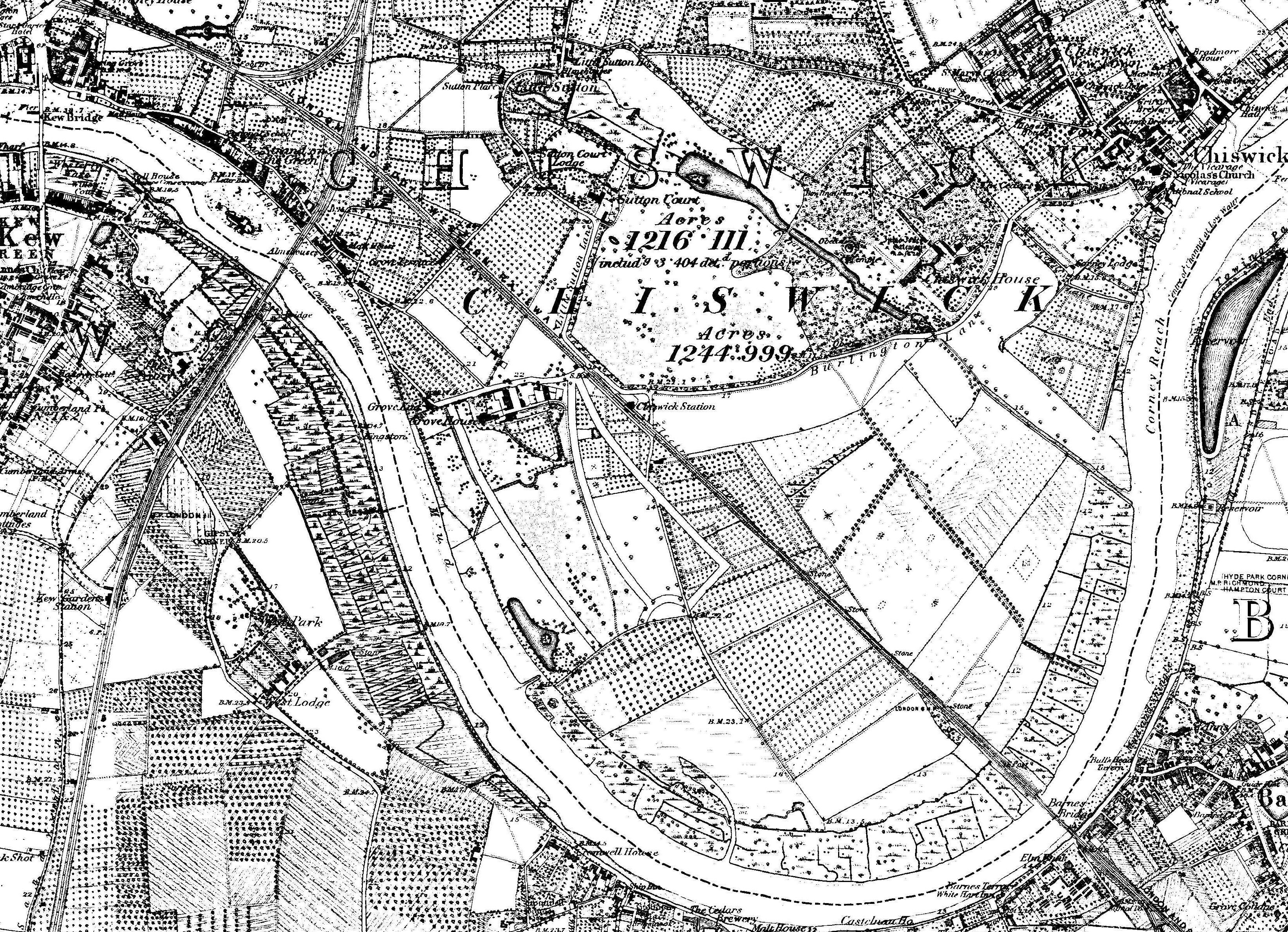
Grove Park area on Ordnance Survey map, c. 1880. The riverside part of Dukes Meadows is shown as marsh; the strip on the eastern side is shown as orchards and meadows.

=== Threats ===
In 1902, the land to the south of Chiswick's Grove Park district consisted of orchards and meadows with a farmhouse. A plan was made that year to build homes for 40,000 people (more than the population of Chiswick at that time) on the site, in a new town to be called Burlingwick, but they were never built.

A second threat arose in 1914, when the Brentford Gas Company introduced a bill in Parliament to build a gasworks over 80 acres (32 hectares) of the meadows. Chiswick residents objected to the plan. On 6 February 1914, The Times printed an editorial opposing the scheme, stating that "The scheme offends against the modern axiom of town-planning which insists that all amenities of living for workers should be safeguarded in densely populated areas, the new industries should be established as far afield as possible, and that land ripe for building – such as the Chiswick orchard farm – near the heart of the metropolis should be utilized for parks and garden settlement. It is to be hoped that no more will be heard of so unwelcome and unnecessary a proposal". The bill was not passed.

In 1926, a third threat emerged, a plan by the London and Home Counties Electricity Authority to build an electricity generating station on the scale of Battersea Power Station, over an area of 45 acres (18 hectares). The authority had bought Chiswick House and its grounds from the Duke of Devonshire, and offered to swap these for the Dukes Meadows land. The local Council was keen to get Chiswick House, but the deal was opposed by residents and rowers alike. A private member's bill was brought to Parliament but it was rejected in 1927. In 1928, the new Central Electricity Board dropped the plan, as other stations including Fulham Power Station would have sufficient capacity.

=== Creation ===
In 1923, Chiswick Urban District purchased over 200 acres (81 hectares) of land from the Duke of Devonshire to create a park. To finance the purchase, gravel extraction took place from 1924 to 1937, at a rate of five acres per year, earning £1500 per acre; the gravel pits were restored and filled in with rubbish from central London after 1948. Paddling pools were constructed on the eastern side of the meadows.

Comparison of the paddling pool area in 1926 and 2022

Newly-constructed paddling pools on eastern side of the park in use, c. 1926

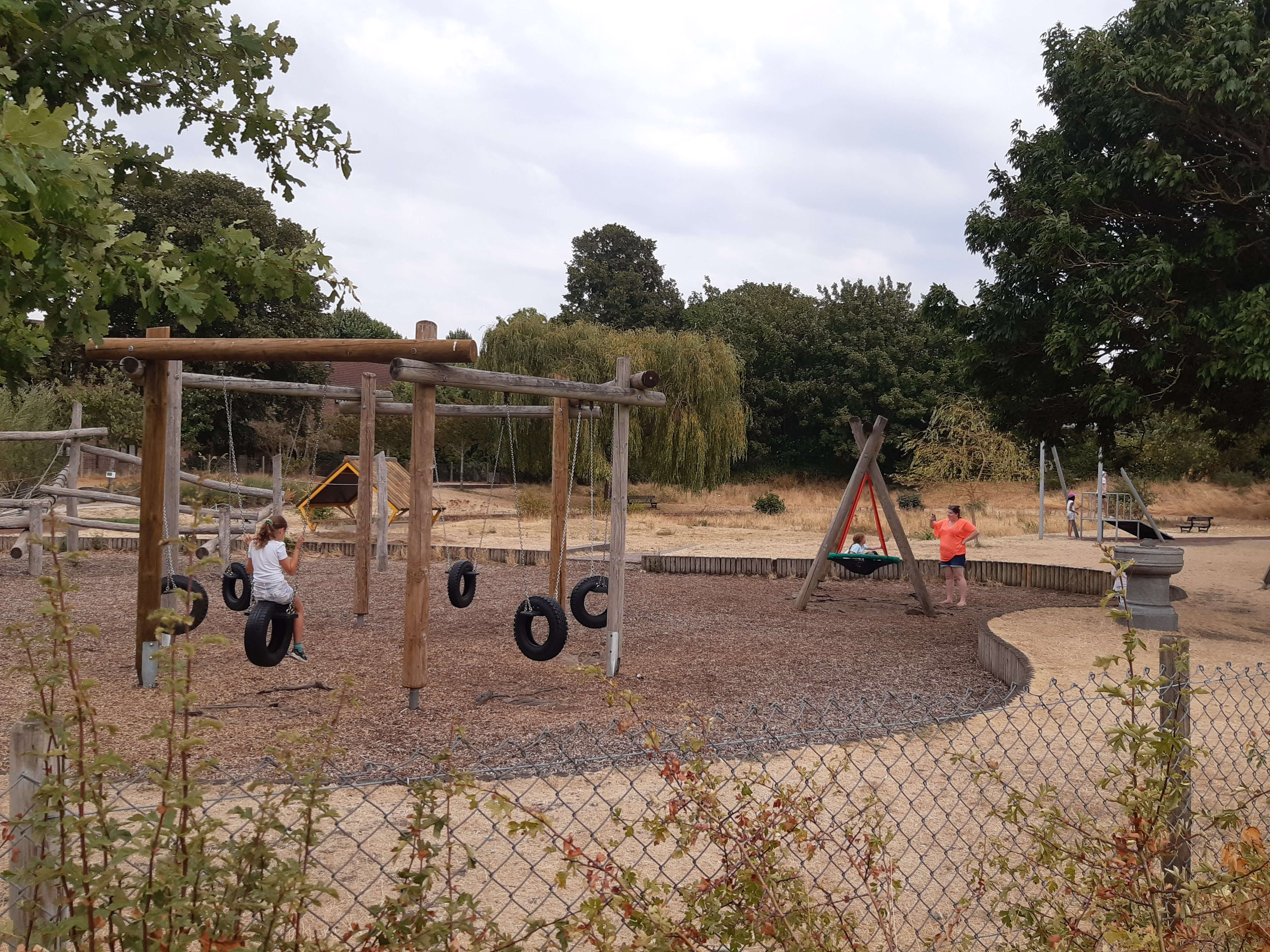
Play area on old paddling pool site, 2022

A seaside-type promenade and a bandstand were built alongside the Thames riverfront and opened by Prince Albert, Duke of York (later King George VI) in 1926.

Comparison of the riverside area in 1926 and 2022

Contemporary postcard of 1926 "New Embankment" with treeless riverbank and concrete posts with twisted steel railings

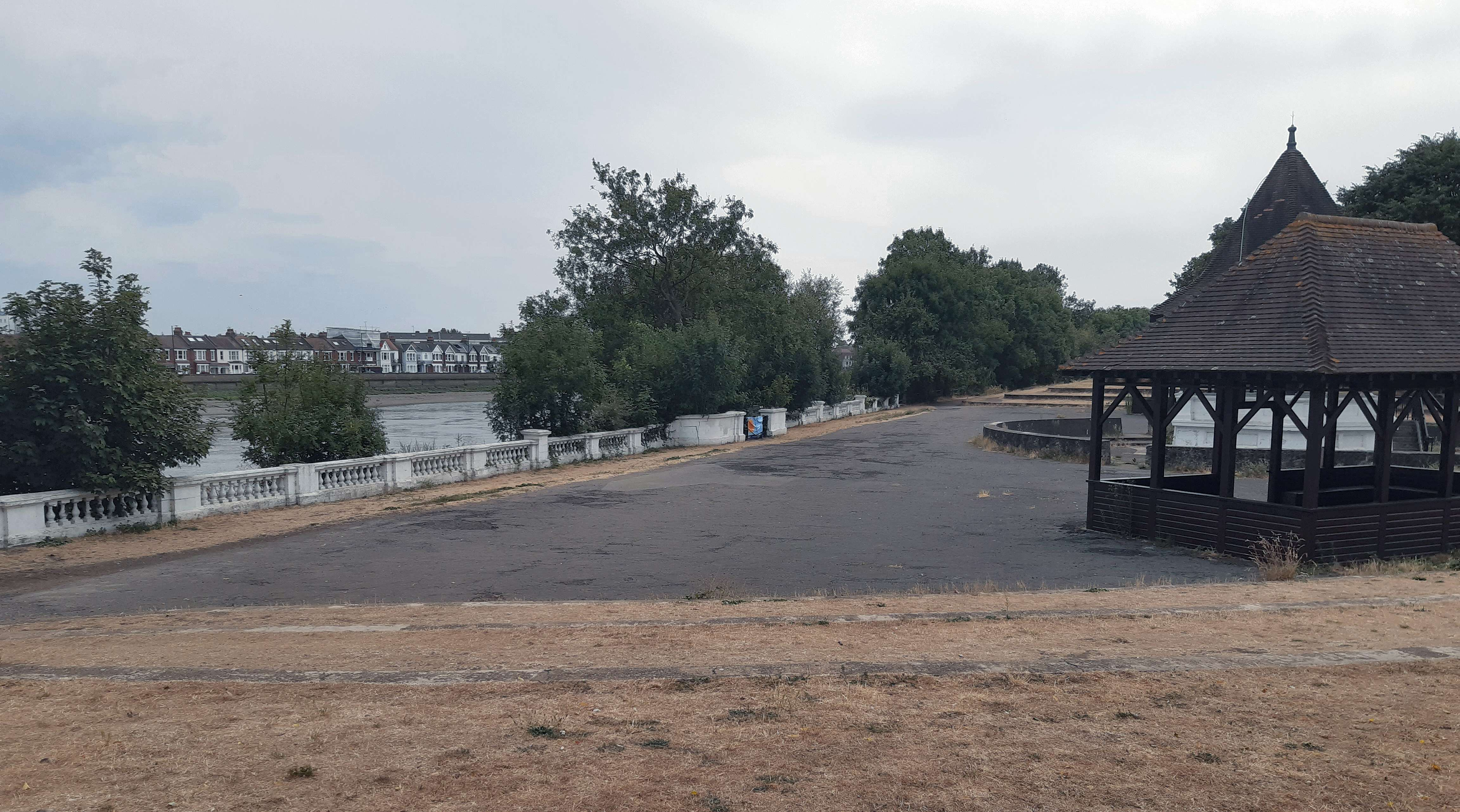
Riverside and bandstand, 2022

=== Reputation ===
The murder of Elizabeth Figg, whose body was found on 17 June 1959 in the Meadows, is one of the six unsolved killings of the Hammersmith nude murders. At that time, the park had a reputation as a lovers' lane, and prostitutes were known to take their clients there.

== Park ==
=== Farmers market, allotments, and sports ===
The Chiswick farmers market opened in 2001, and was visited by Andrew Cavendish, 11th Duke of Devonshire that year. The market is held every Sunday in the courtyard that once belonged to Grove Park Farmhouse. The stalls sell meat, cheese, vegetables, fruit, juices, and prepared dishes.

Next to the farmers market is an area of allotments run by the London Borough of Hounslow. Much of the rest of the Dukes Meadows area, outside the public park, is covered with sports fields, used for golf, tennis, football, rugby, and other sports. A house on the golf course is the main filming location for the pre-recorded tasks in the gameshow Taskmaster.

Activities on Dukes Meadows

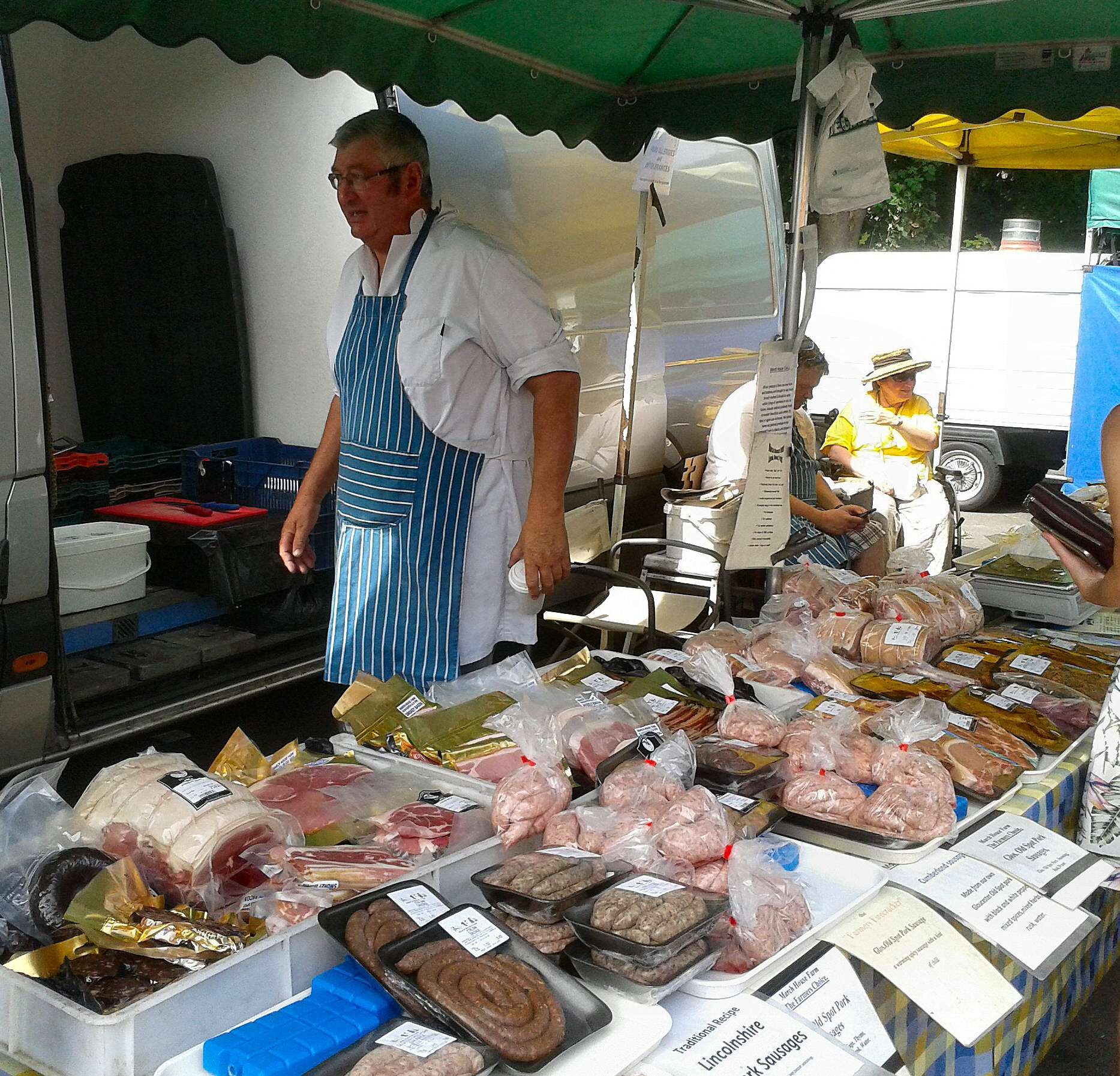
Meat from a farm in Leicestershire at Chiswick Farmers' market

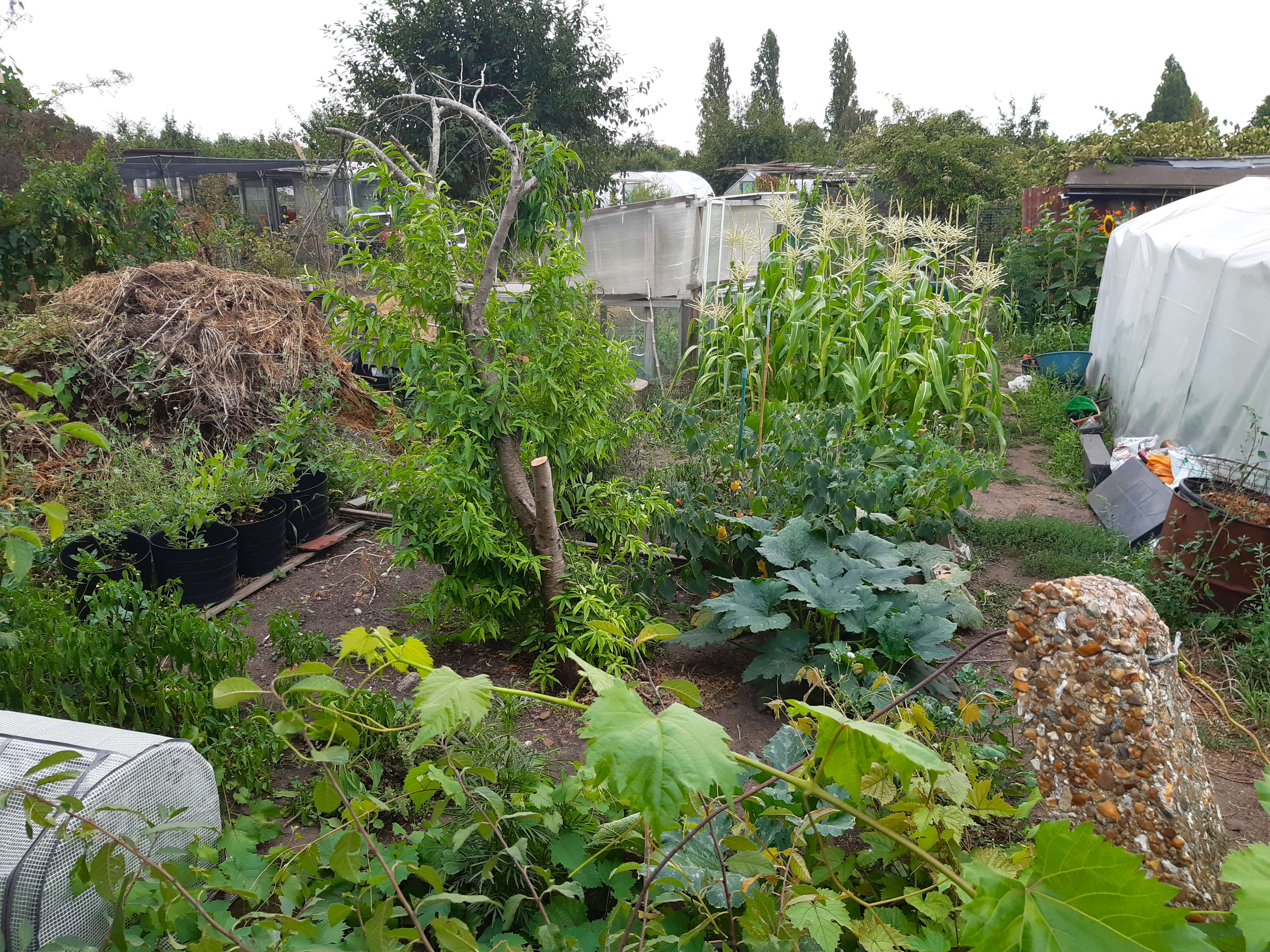
Allotments run by the London Borough of Hounslow

=== Dukes Meadows Trust ===
In 1998, a group of local people formed the Friends of Dukes Meadows to protect the interests of the park; this was registered as a charity in 2001, and in 2006, it became the Dukes Meadows Trust. The old paddling pools, which had fallen into disuse, were replaced with a new water play area and fountain (just to the north), a refreshments kiosk, and a sandpit. Volunteers working for the Trust tidied the whole area, created a community garden, planted hedges and fruit trees, and painted the bandstand. Construction work was paid for with rent from Chiswick Farmers' Market and from the converted farm buildings. The approach was cited in CABE Space's "guide for community groups working to improve public space".

Diversity of land use by the Dukes Meadows Trust

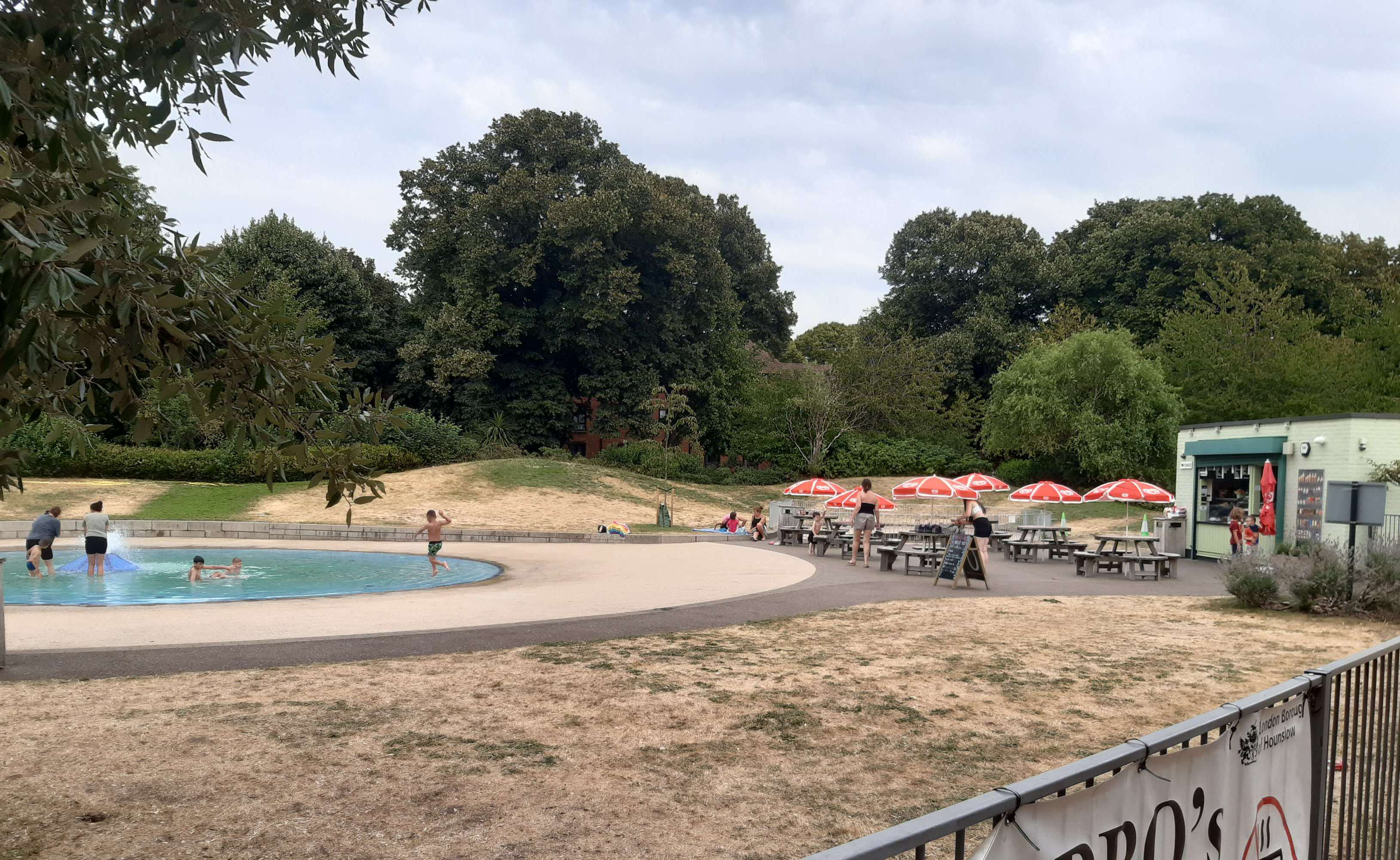
Water play area and kiosk

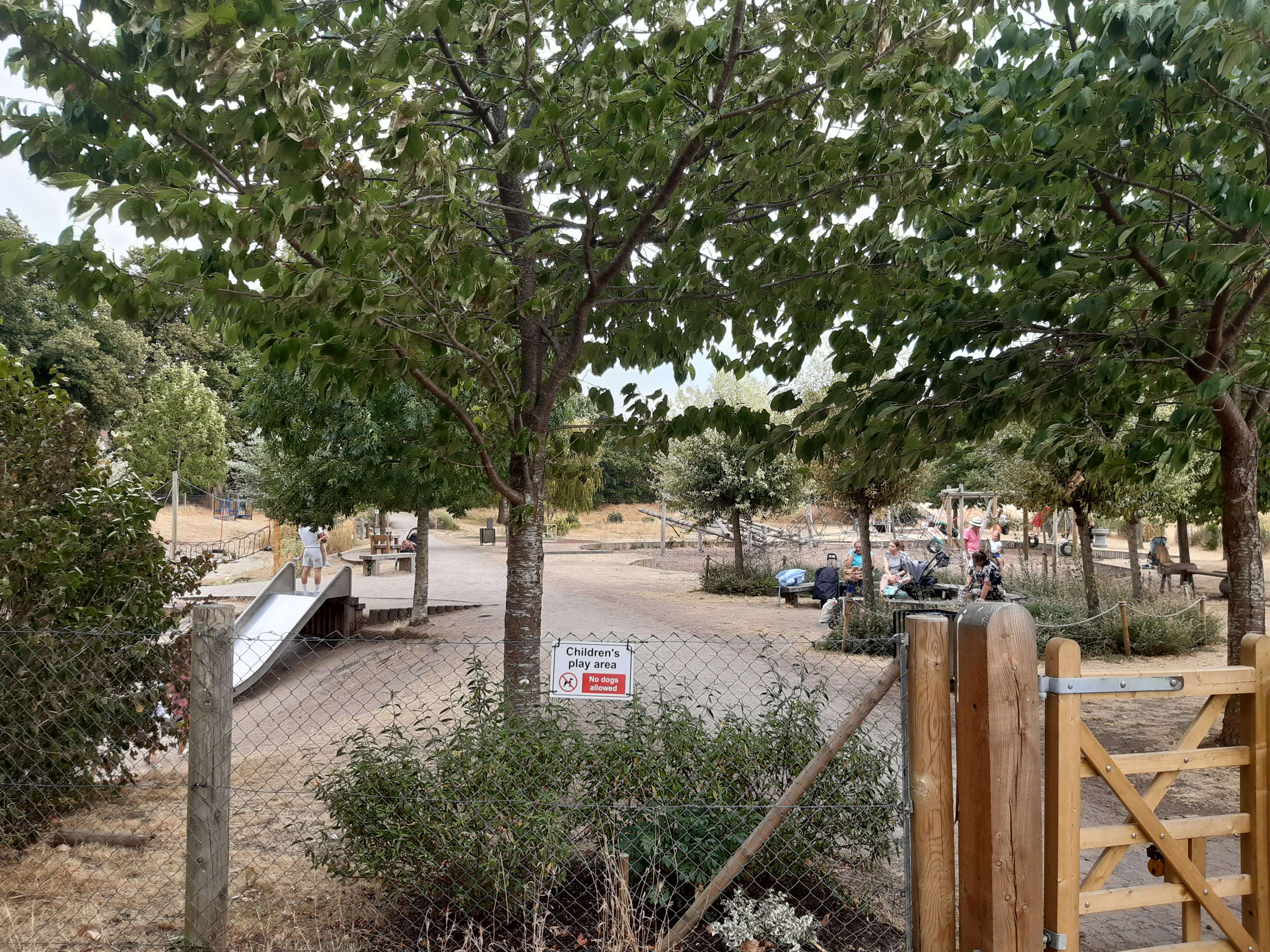
Landscaped play area

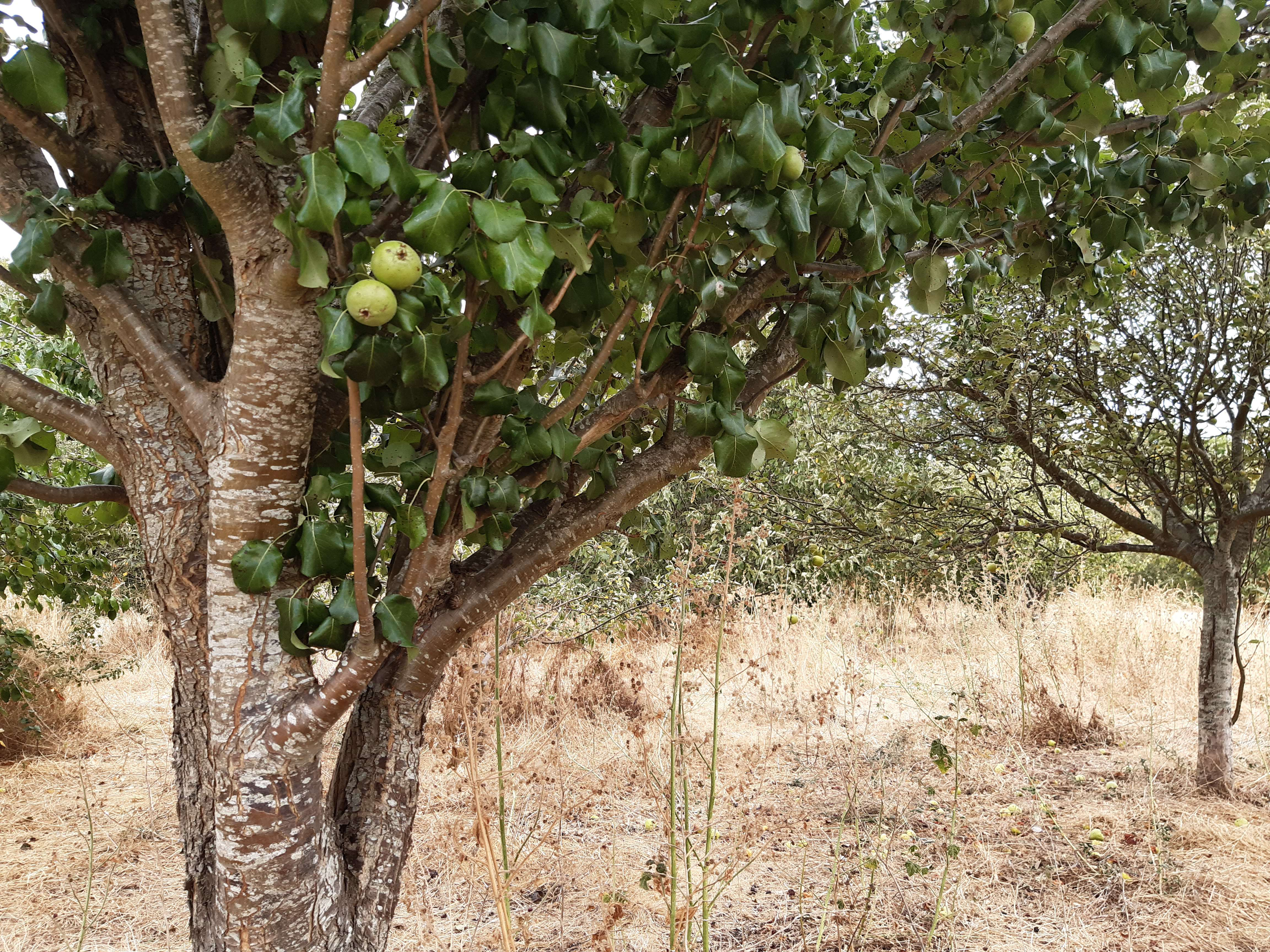
Apple trees in the orchard

=== Thames Path ===
The Thames Path runs beside the river, along the southern edge of Dukes Meadows. At the upstream side, the path was diverted by the railway leading to Barnes Railway Bridge. The Dukes Meadows Footbridge connects the Thames Path on either side of the railway, allowing the path to follow the river without diversion, in the words of the London Borough of Hounslow's report Duke's Meadows Regeneration, "removing a frustrating dog-leg along the scenic walking and cycling route."

Local enhancements to the Thames Path

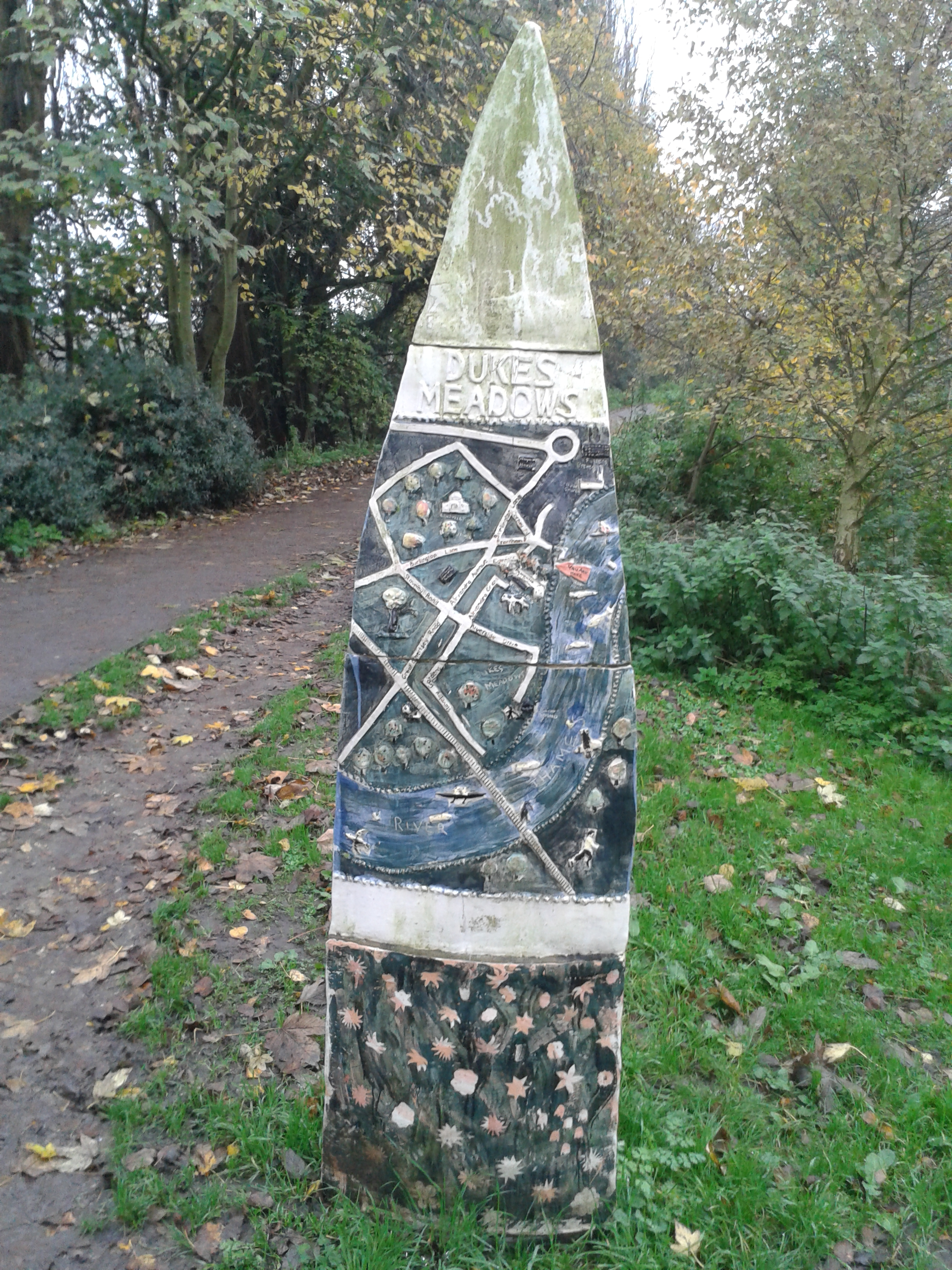
Ceramic way marker with map on the Thames Path. Installed 2002

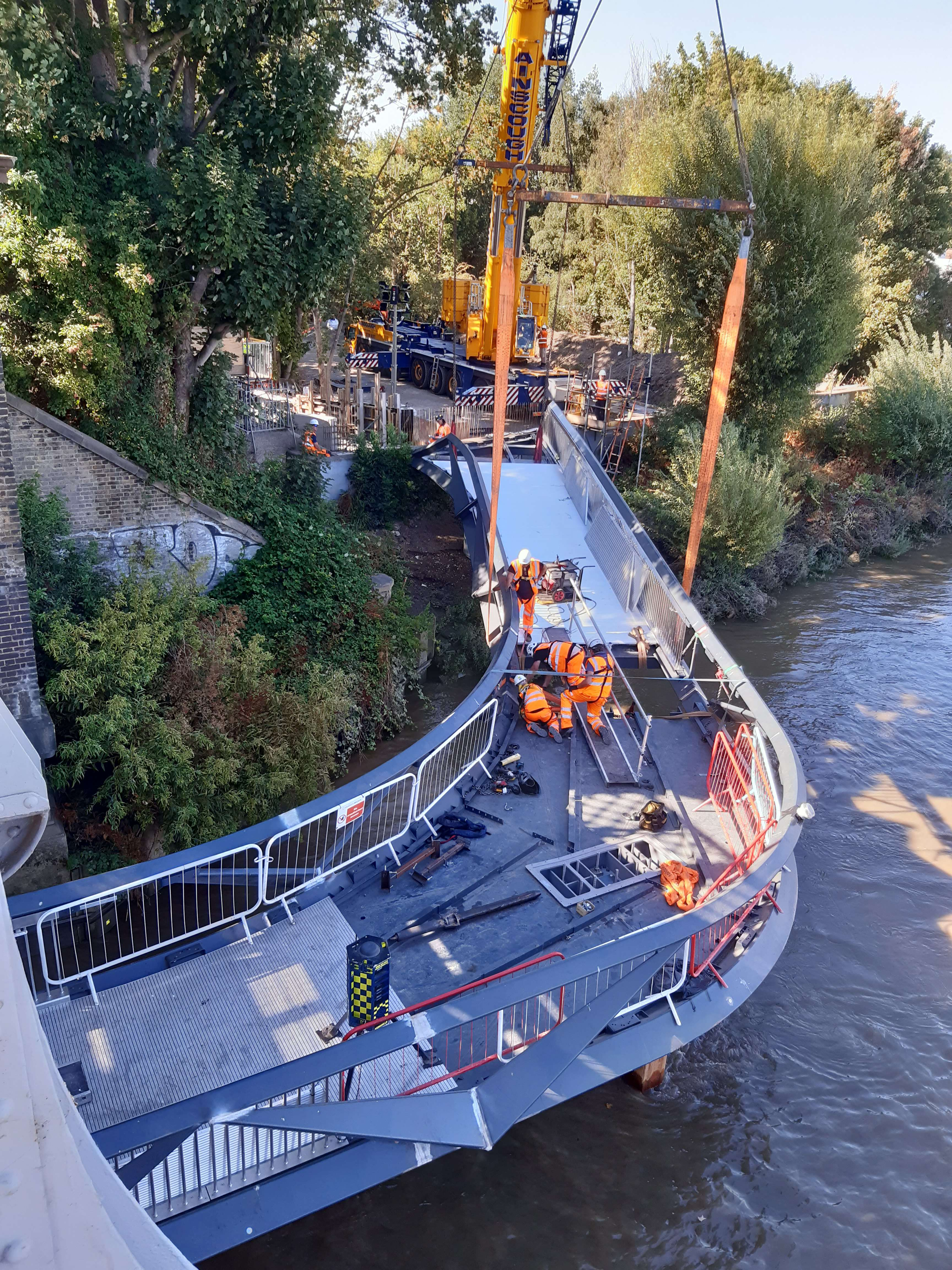
Dukes Meadows Footbridge under construction, 2022. The railway is on the left, Dukes Meadows to the right.

=== Emanuel Hollow ===
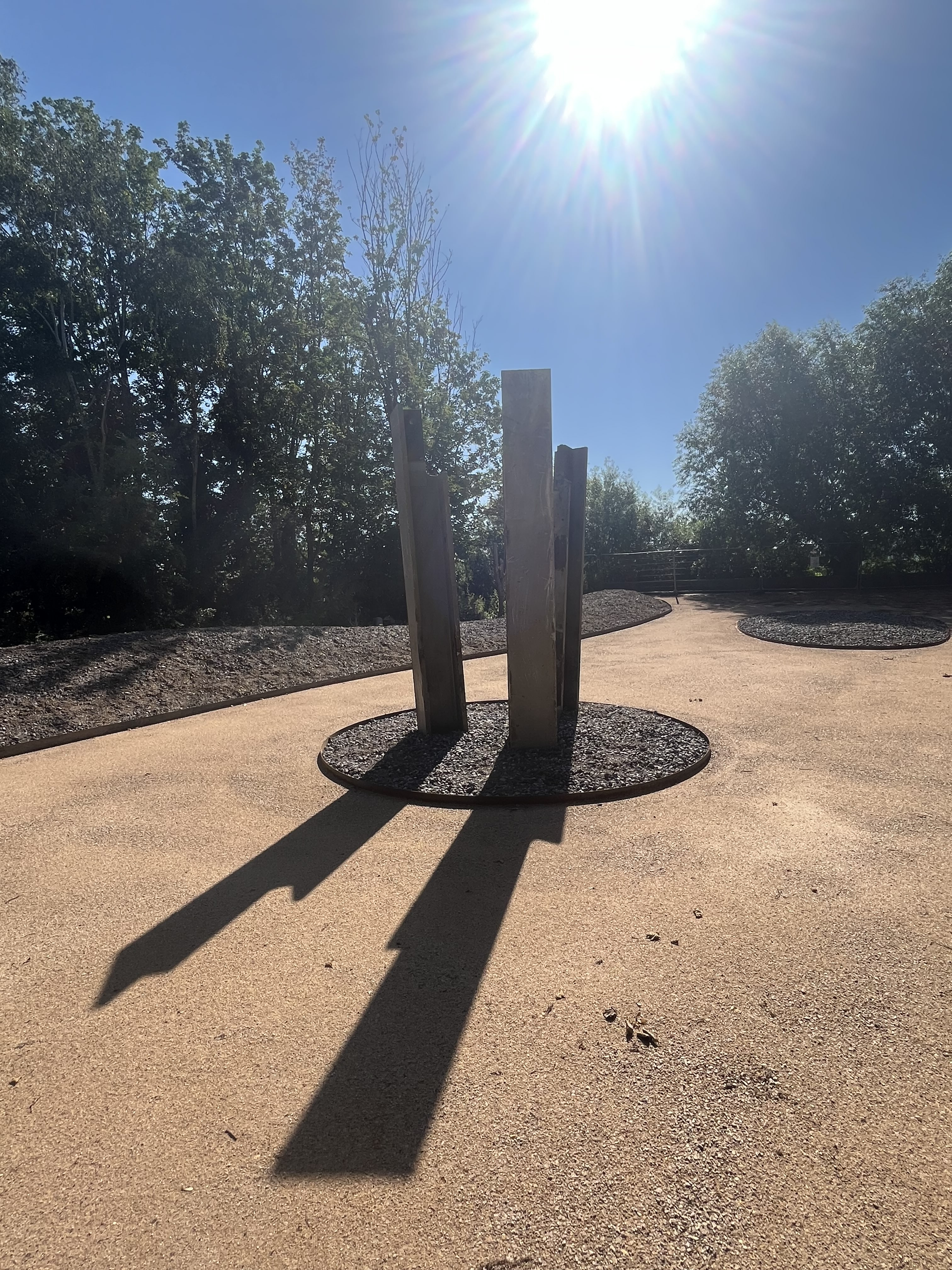
Photograph of the Emanuel Hollow Girder Sculpture at Dukes Meadows in Chiswick

After consultation in 2024 and 2025, Emanuel Hollow was created and opened in July 2026 next to the new footbridge. It included the Emanuel Hollow Girder Sculpture.
