= Hammersmith nude murders =

Series of six murders in 1960s London

A Metropolitan Police identikit of a suspect, compiled from a description by an eyewitness following the murder of Frances Brown in 1964. The suspect has never been apprehended or identified.

The Hammersmith nude murders were a series of six murders in West London, England, in 1964 and 1965. The victims, all prostitutes, were found undressed in or near the River Thames, leading the press to nickname the killer Jack the Stripper (a reference to Jack the Ripper). Two earlier murders, committed in West London in 1959 and 1963, have also been linked by some investigators to the same perpetrator.

Despite "intense media interest and one of the biggest manhunts in Scotland Yard's history" the case is unsolved. Forensic evidence gathered at the time is believed to have been destroyed or lost.

== Victims ==
=== Elizabeth Figg ===
Elizabeth Figg
- Born: 24 March 1938; Bebington, Cheshire, England
- Died: 17 June 1959 (aged 21); London, England
- Cause of death: Asphyxiation due to manual strangulation
- Body discovered: Duke's Meadows, Chiswick
- Other name: Ann Phillips
- Occupation: Prostitute

Figg was found dead at 5:10 am on 17 June 1959 by police officers on routine patrol in Duke's Meadows, Chiswick, on the north bank of the River Thames. The park had a reputation as a lovers' lane, and prostitutes were known to take their clients there.

Figg's body was found on scrubland between Dan Mason Drive and the river's towpath, approximately 200 yards (180 m) west of Barnes Bridge. Her dress was torn at the waist and opened to reveal her breasts; marks around the neck were consistent with strangulation. Figg's underwear and shoes were missing, and no identification or personal possessions were found. A pathologist concluded that death had occurred between midnight and 2:00 a.m. on 17 June.

A post-mortem photograph of Figg's face distributed to the press was independently recognized by her roommate and her mother.

Extensive searches of the area – including the river bed – failed to find Figg's underwear, black stiletto shoes, or white handbag. A police official theorized that a client had murdered her in his car, after removing her shoes and underwear, and that these and her handbag had then remained in the car after the body was disposed of at Duke's Meadows. The proprietor at The Ship public house, on the opposite side of the river to where Figg was found, said that on the night of the murder he and his wife had seen a car's headlights as it parked in that area at 12:05 a.m. Shortly after the lights were switched off, they heard a woman's scream.

=== Gwynneth Rees ===
Gwynneth Rees
- Born: 6 August 1941; Barry, Vale of Glamorgan, Wales
- Disappeared: 29 September 1963
- Died: 1963 (aged 22); London, England
- Cause of death: Unknown
- Body discovered: Townmead Road, Mortlake
- Other names: Georgette Rees, Tina Smart, Tina Dawson
- Occupation: Prostitute

The body of Welsh-born Gwynneth Rees was found on 8 November 1963 at the Barnes Borough Council household refuse disposal site on Townmead Road, Mortlake. The dump was situated 40 yards (37 m) from the Thames towpath, and approximately 1 mile (1.6 km) from Duke's Meadows.

Rees was naked except for a single stocking on her right leg, extending no further up than the ankle. She had been accidentally decapitated by a shovel which workmen had been using to level the refuse.

=== Hannah Tailford ===
Hannah Tailford
- Born: 19 August 1933; Heddon-on-the-Wall, Northumberland, England
- Disappeared: January 1964
- Died: 1964 (aged 30); London, England
- Cause of death: Drowning
- Body discovered: Upper Mall, Hammersmith
- Other names: Hannah Lynch, Anne Tailer, Anne Taylor
- Occupation: Prostitute

Tailford was found dead on 2 February 1964 on the Thames foreshore below Linden House – the clubhouse of the London Corinthian Sailing Club – west of Hammersmith Bridge. She had been strangled, several of her teeth were missing, and her underwear had been stuffed into her mouth.

=== Irene Lockwood ===
Irene Charlotte Lockwood
- Born: 29 September 1938; Walkeringham, Nottinghamshire, England
- Disappeared: 7 April 1964
- Died: 1964 (aged 25); London, England
- Cause of death: Drowning
- Body discovered: Duke's Meadow, Chiswick
- Other names: Sandra Russell, Sandra Lockwood
- Occupation: Prostitute

Lockwood was found dead on 8 April 1964 on the foreshore of the Thames at Corney Reach, Chiswick, not far from where Tailford had been found. With the discovery of this victim, police surmised that a serial murderer was at large. Lockwood was pregnant at the time of her death.

=== Helen Barthelemy ===
Helen Catherine Barthelemy
- Born: 9 June 1941; Ormiston, East Lothian, Scotland
- Disappeared: 22 April 1964
- Died: 1964 (aged 22); London, England
- Cause of death: Asphyxiation by strangulation
- Body discovered: Boston Manor Road, Brentford
- Occupation: Prostitute

East Lothian-born Barthelemy was found dead on 24 April 1964 in an alleyway at the rear of 199 Boston Manor Road, Brentford. Barthelemy's death gave investigators their first solid piece of evidence in the case: flecks of paint used in car manufacturing. Police felt that the paint had probably come from the killer's workplace; they therefore focused on tracing it to a business nearby.

=== Mary Fleming ===
Mary Fleming
- Born: 16 September 1933; Clydebank, Scotland
- Disappeared: 11 July 1964
- Died: 1964 (aged 30); London, England
- Cause of death: Asphyxiation by strangulation
- Body discovered: Berrymede Road, Chiswick
- Occupation: Prostitute

Scottish-born Fleming was found dead on 14 July 1964 outside 48 Berrymede Road, Chiswick. Once again, paint spots were found on the body; many neighbours had also heard a car reversing down the street just before the body was discovered.

=== Frances Brown ===
Frances Brown
- Born: 3 January 1943; Glasgow, Scotland
- Disappeared: 23 October 1964
- Died: 1964 (aged 21); London, England
- Cause of death: Asphyxiation by strangulation
- Body discovered: Hornton Street, Kensington
- Other names: Margaret McGowan, Frances Quinn, Anne Sutherland, Donna Sutherland, Susan Edwards, Nuala Rowlands
- Occupation: Prostitute

Brown, a native of Edinburgh, was last seen alive on 23 October 1964 by a colleague who saw her get into a client's car; on 25 November her body was found in a car park on Hornton Street, Kensington. She had been strangled. The colleague was able to provide police with an identikit picture and a description of the car, thought to be a grey Ford Zephyr. Brown had testified as a witness for the defence, along with Christine Keeler and Mandy Rice-Davies, at the trial of Stephen Ward in July 1963.

=== Bridget O'Hara ===
Bridget O'Hara
- Born: 2 March 1937; Dublin, Ireland
- Disappeared: 11 January 1965
- Died: 1965 (aged 27); London, England
- Cause of death: Asphyxiation
- Body discovered: Heron Trading Estate, Acton
- Other names: Bridie O'Hara, Bridget Moore
- Occupation: Prostitute

Irish immigrant Bridget "Bridie" O'Hara was found dead on 16 February 1965 near a storage shed behind the Heron Trading Estate, Acton. She had been missing since 11 January. Once again, O'Hara's body turned up flecks of industrial paint, which were traced to an electrical transformer near where she was discovered. Her body also showed signs of having been stored in a warm environment. The transformer was a good fit for both the paint and the heating.

== Investigation ==
Chief Superintendent John Du Rose of Scotland Yard, the detective put in charge of the case, interviewed almost 7,000 suspects.

In the spring of 1965, the investigation into the murders encountered a major breakthrough when a sample of paint which perfectly matched that recovered from several victims' bodies was found beneath a concealed transformer at the rear of a building on the Heron Factory Estate in Acton. This factory estate faced a paint spraying shop. Shortly thereafter, Du Rose held a news conference in which he falsely announced that the police had narrowed the suspect pool down to 20 men and that, by a process of elimination, these suspects were being eliminated from the investigation. After a short time, he announced that the suspect pool contained only 10 members, and then three. There were no further known Stripper killings following the initial news conference.

According to the writer Anthony Summers, Hannah Tailford and Frances Brown, the Stripper's third and seventh victims, were peripherally connected to the 1963 Profumo affair. Some victims were also known to engage in the underground party scene in addition to appearing in pornographic movies. Several writers have postulated that the victims may have known each other, and that the killer may have been connected to this scene as well.

== Suspects ==
=== Kenneth Archibald ===
On 27 April 1964, Kenneth Archibald, a 57-year-old caretaker at the Holland Park Lawn Tennis Club, walked into Notting Hill police station and voluntarily confessed to the killing of Irene Lockwood. Archibald was charged with the murder and stood trial at the Old Bailey in June 1964. When asked to plead, he retracted his confession and pleaded not guilty. There was no other evidence to link him to the crime and on 23 June 1964, he was found not guilty by a jury and acquitted by the judge, Mr Justice Neild.

=== Mungo Ireland ===
For Du Rose, the most likely suspect was a Scottish security guard called Mungo Ireland, whom Du Rose first identified in a BBC television interview in 1970 as a respectable married man in his forties whom he codenamed "Big John". Ireland had apparently been identified as a suspect shortly after Bridget O'Hara's murder, when flecks of industrial paint were traced to the Heron Trading Estate, where he had worked as a security guard.

Shortly after this connection was made, Ireland poisoned himself with carbon monoxide, leaving a note for his wife that read: "I can't stick it any longer", and finished, "To save you and the police looking for me I'll be in the garage". Whilst seen by many as a strong suspect in the killings, recent research suggests that Ireland was in Scotland when O'Hara was murdered, and therefore could not have been the Stripper.

Crime author Neil Milkins said the killings stopped after Ireland's death and the police task force set up to catch the killer was reduced and finally disbanded. Milkins, who wrote the book Who Was Jack the Stripper?, was an investigative consultant for the BBC documentary Dark Son: The Hunt for a Serial Killer. "On the morning that Ireland’s body was found, he had been due to appear before Acton Magistrates Court to face a charge of failing to stop his car after being involved in a road traffic accident", said Milkins. "Did Ireland commit suicide to save facing Acton magistrates over a trifling motoring charge or did John Du Rose push him over the edge with his press statements?" The Scotland Yard Serious Crime Review Group re-investigated the Hammersmith murders between 2006 and 2007, and this resulted in a new conclusion. A statement read: "The circumstantial evidence against Mungo Ireland is very strong and it was the view of the officers conducting the most recent review of this case that he was most likely to be responsible." Although Ireland's work records indicated he was in Scotland on the night of O’Hara's disappearance, Scotland Yard believe it is possible that these may have been falsified.

=== Freddie Mills ===
In 2001, reformed gangster Jimmy Tippett Jr. claimed that, during research for his book about London's gangland, he had uncovered information suggesting that British light heavyweight boxing champion Freddie Mills was responsible for the murders. According to Tippett, Kray-era gangsters, including Charlie Richardson and Frankie Fraser, had long suspected Mills of being the murderer.

Mills had previously been linked with the murders by Peter Neale, a freelance journalist from Balham, south London, who told police in July 1972 that he had received information, in confidence, from a serving chief inspector that Mills "killed the nude prostitutes". He also said that this was "common knowledge in the West End. Many people would say, 'Oh, Freddie did them in...'"

Mills was found shot dead in his car, apparently by suicide, in July 1965.

The suggestion that Mills was the Hammersmith nudes murderer originated with gangster Frankie Fraser, who told it to policeman Bob Berry, who told The Sun crime reporter Michael Litchfield. Fraser claimed that the story was confessed by Mills, to Scotland Yard Chief Superintendent John Du Rose, and told by Du Rose to him; but when Du Rose published his autobiography which touched on the 'Hammersmith Nude Murders', there was no mention of Freddie Mills with regard to this case. The claims have since been dismissed. Peter McInnes put the allegations to the investigating officer, who stated that Mills had never been a suspect during the investigation.

=== Metropolitan Police officer ===
David Seabrook, in his book Jack of Jumps (2006), wrote that a former Metropolitan Police detective was a suspect in the opinion of several senior detectives investigating the case. Owen Summers, a journalist for The Sun newspaper, had previously raised suspicion about the unnamed officer's involvement in a series of articles published by the newspaper in 1972, and Daily Mirror journalist Brian McConnell followed a similar line of inquiry in his book Found Naked and Dead in 1974. He was also considered by Dick Kirby, a former Metropolitan Police detective, in his book Laid Bare: The Nude Murders and the Hunt for 'Jack the Stripper' (2016), in which Kirby referred to him only as "the Cop".

=== Tommy Butler ===
In their book The Survivor (2002), Jimmy Evans and Martin Short allege the culprit was Superintendent Tommy Butler of the Metropolitan Police's Flying Squad. Butler died in 1970.

=== Harold Jones ===
The Crime & Investigation channel's Fred Dinenage: Murder Casebook put forward the theory in 2011 that the killer could have been Harold Jones, a convicted murderer from Wales. Jones killed two girls in 1921 in his home town of Abertillery. Because he was 15 at the time, he was not liable for the death penalty and instead received a life sentence. He was released from Wandsworth Prison in 1941, at the age of 35, for exemplary behaviour. He is believed to have then returned to Abertillery and visited the graves of his victims. By 1947, Jones was living in Fulham, London. All the Stripper murders had similar features to his early murders, with no sexual assault but extreme violence inflicted on the victims. Due to poor record-keeping, he was never considered as a possible suspect by the police. Jones died in Hammersmith in 1971.

The Welsh writer Neil Milkins, in Who Was Jack the Stripper? (2011), also concluded that Jones was the perpetrator. While researching Jones for his book Every Mother's Nightmare, Milkins had traced the murderer's movements: "[H]e turned up in Fulham in the late 1940s calling himself Harry Stevens, and stayed at that address in Hestercombe Avenue until 1962, at which point he disappeared again. I came across the Jack the Stripper case on the internet and realised that in the same three years Jones' whereabouts remained unknown – 1962 to 1965 – a number of prostitutes had been murdered in the same west London area."

In January 2019, the possible involvement of Jones was re-examined in the 90-minute documentary Dark Son: The Hunt for a Serial Killer broadcast on BBC Two. Criminologist Professor David Wilson and an investigative team, including former detective Jackie Malton and forensic psychologist Professor Mike Berry, use contemporary policing techniques such as geographic profiling and offender profiling to see if the crimes of Jones the boy can be measured against those of the London killer. There are many similarities.

== In the media ==
The murders have been the subject of several television documentaries:

- "Fairies Wear Boots" - Black Sabbath song from the album Paranoid, titled "Jack the Stripper/Fairies Wear Boots" on the original 1971 United States release.
- Great Crimes and Trials documentary series – "The Hammersmith Murders" episode, first broadcast in the UK by BBC in 1993.
- Fred Dinenage: Murder Casebook documentary series – "Murders That Shocked a Nation: The Welsh Child Killer", first broadcast in the UK by CI in 2011.
- Dark Son: The Hunt for a Serial Killer (2018) – BBC documentary. This was filmed in both London and Abertillery, and contributors include criminologist David Wilson and writer Robin Jarossi, author of The Hunt for the '60s Ripper.

== In fiction ==
The crime novel Goodbye Piccadilly, Farewell Leicester Square (1969), written by Arthur La Bern, is loosely based on the case. The book was adapted for the Alfred Hitchcock movie Frenzy (1972).

The case inspired horror film The Fiend (1972), in which a misogynistic serial killer leaves his naked victims across London.

The crime novel Bad Penny Blues (2009) by Cathi Unsworth is closely based on the case.

== See also ==
- Gordon Cummins – the "Blackout Ripper"
- Anthony Hardy – the "Camden Ripper"
- Gary Ridgway – the "Green River Killer"
- Peter Sutcliffe – the "Yorkshire Ripper"
- Steve Wright – the "Suffolk Strangler"
- List of serial killers in the United Kingdom
- List of fugitives from justice who disappeared
