= Dukes Meadows Footbridge =

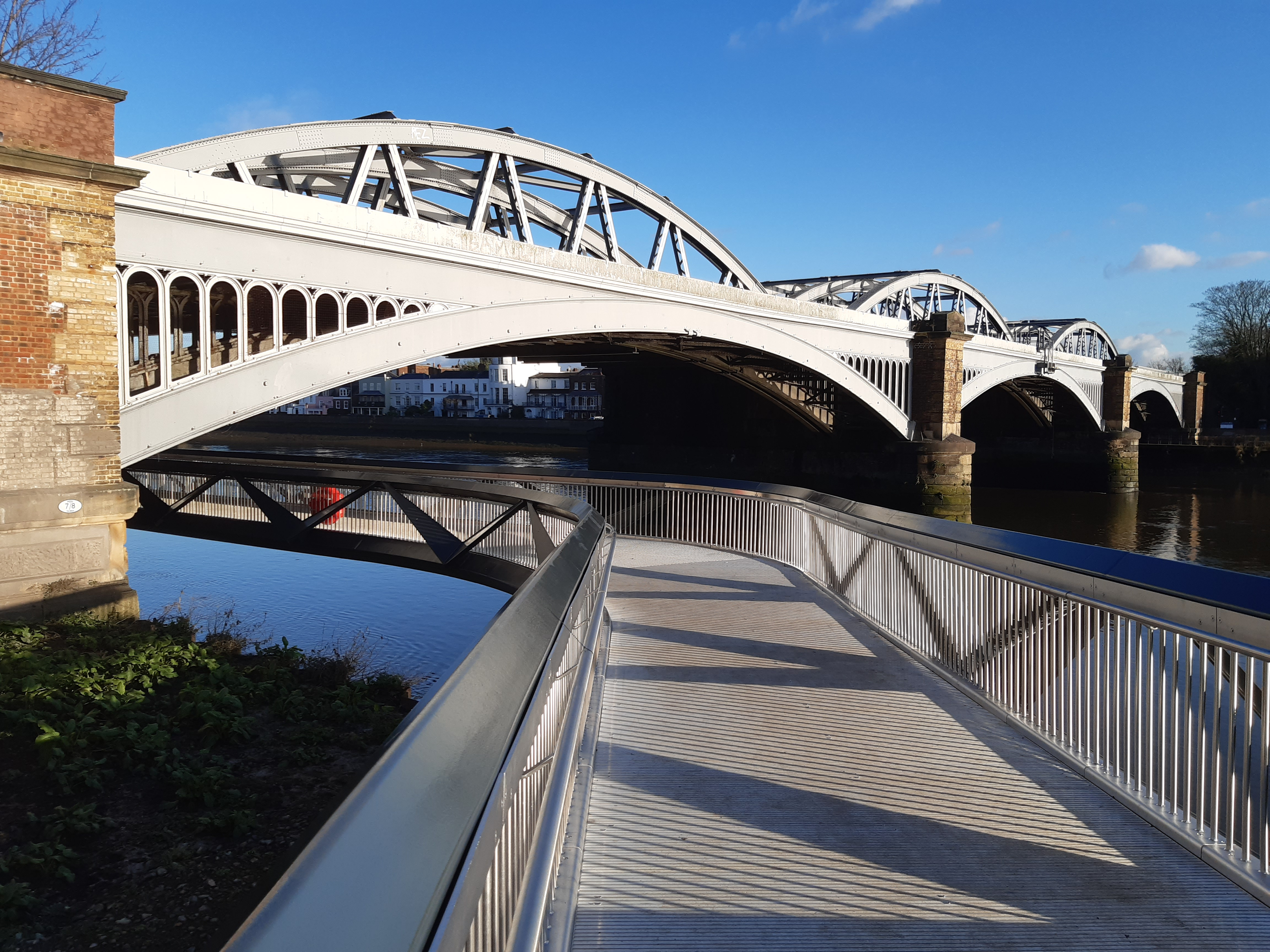
- Coordinates: 51.473°N 0.2544°W
- Carries: Pedestrian
- Locale: Chiswick, England

History
- Designer: Moxon Architects

Location
- Interactive map of Dukes Meadows Footbridge

Dukes Meadows Footbridge is a pedestrian bridge beside the River Thames in Chiswick in West London. Opened in 2023, it passes underneath the northern span of Barnes Railway Bridge and allows the Thames Path on the north bank at Dukes Meadows to follow the river without diversion.

The bridge was designed by Moxon Architects as a "half through" truss structure. The footway is of stainless steel and aluminium. Planning permission for the design was granted early in 2019. CampbellReith served as the consulting engineers for the bridge's structural, geotechnical, environmental, and civil engineering, with marine engineering by Marmus, electrical engineering by Slender Winter Partnership, and environmental consultancy by Thomson. Construction was by Knights Brown.

== Requirement ==
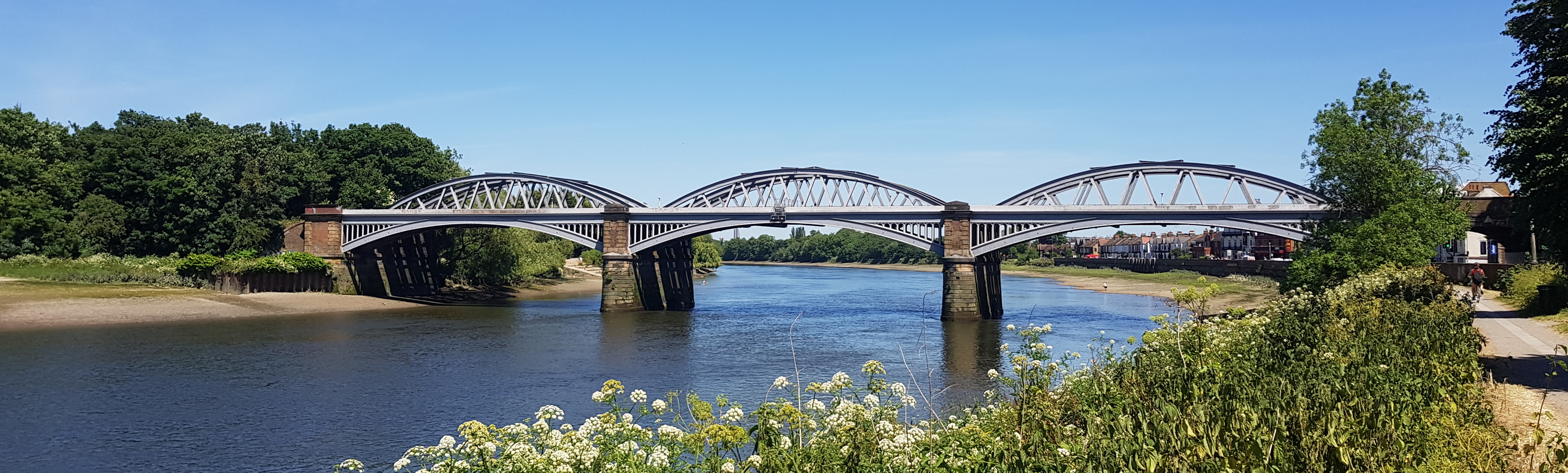
Barnes Railway Bridge in 2020, looking downstream from the south bank, forming a barrier to the Thames Path along the north bank (left). Duke's Hollow nature reserve is on the extreme left of the image.

Before the bridge was constructed, people using the Thames Path on the north bank of the River Thames at Dukes Meadows, Chiswick were unable to cross the line of the railway near the river. Instead, it diverted some 300 metres northwestwards to the nearest tunnel under the railway embankment. It left the river to run parallel to the railway along The Promenade by the railway's eastern side, returning parallel to the railway on Dan Mason Drive by the railway's western side.

The footbridge connects the Thames Path on either side of the railway, allowing the path to follow the river without diversion, and in the words of the London Borough of Hounslow's report Duke's Meadows Regeneration, "removing a frustrating dog-leg along the scenic walking and cycling route." Because Barnes Railway Bridge is a Grade II listed historic structure, it could not be used as a support, so the footbridge was required to have its own independent support structures, with the footway passing below the northern span of the railway bridge. The bridge is to be open to pedestrians and to users of wheelchairs, mobility scooters and pushchairs.

== Design ==
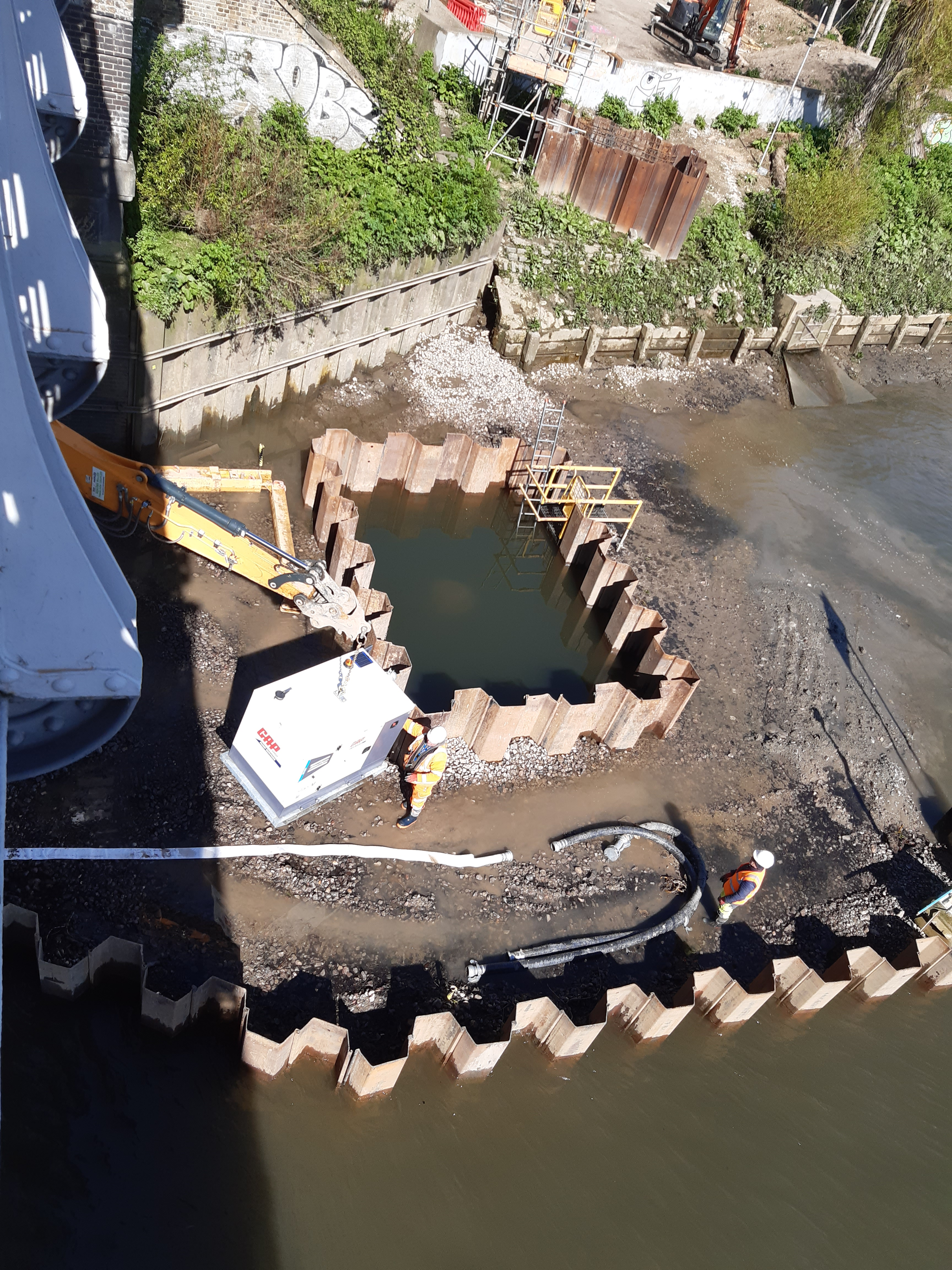
Pump and pilings for downstream pier, April 2022

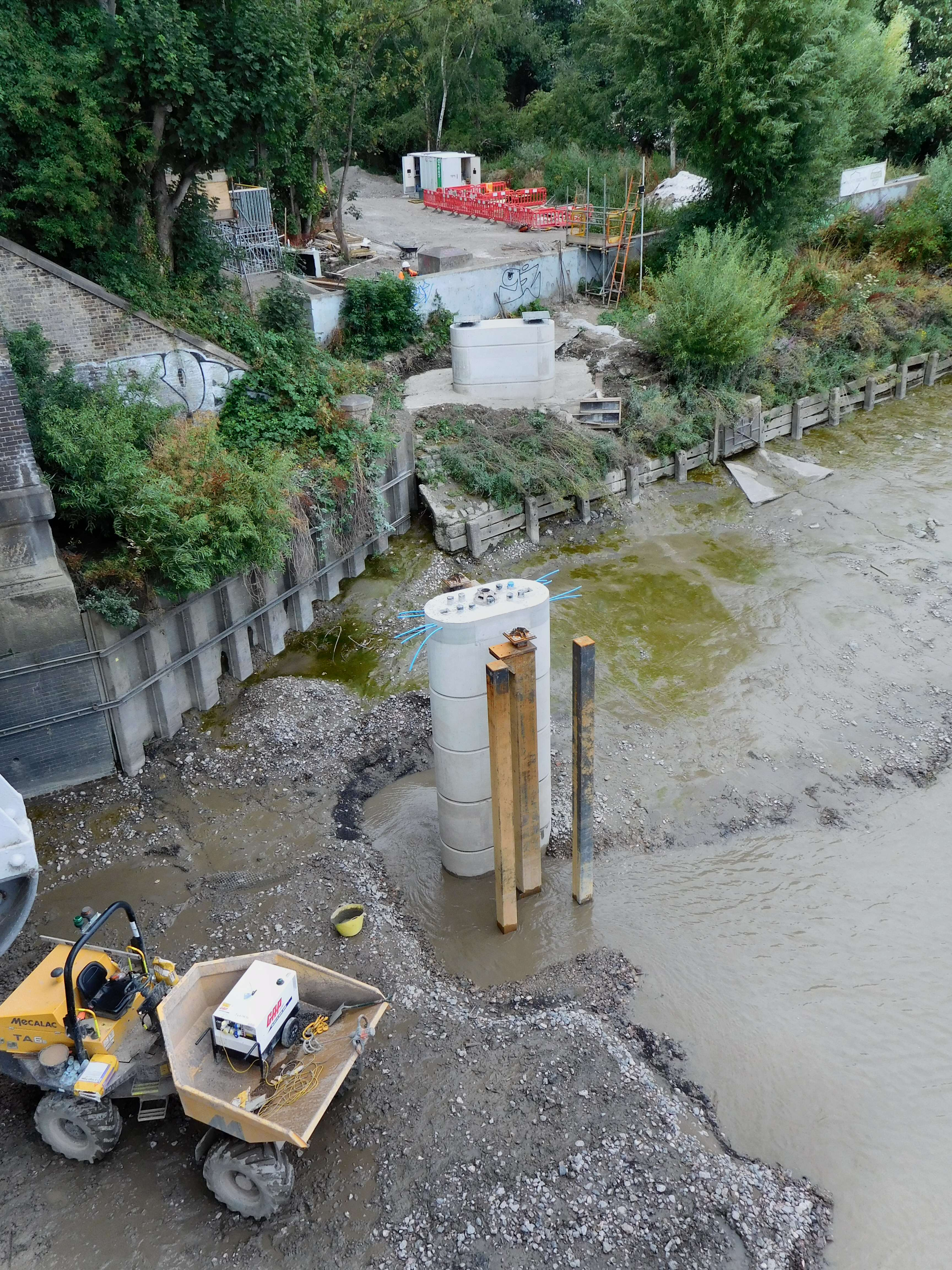
Newly-cast concrete footings for downstream pier

The bridge was designed by Moxon Architects as a "half through" truss structure. The diagonal braces are angled to allow people on the bridge to see the river as much as possible while crossing. The part of the footway in line with the river is supported by two cylindrical piers in the riverbed, one upstream and one downstream of the existing railway bridge. The west and east approaches are supported between those piers and two end piers on the riverbank. The piers are cylinders of steel-reinforced concrete. The footway structure is of stainless steel and aluminium. Planning permission for the design was granted early in 2019, with strong local support.

CampbellReith served as consulting engineers for the bridge's structural, geotechnical, environmental, and civil engineering. Marine engineering was provided by Marmus, and electrical engineering by Slender Winter Partnership. Environmental consultancy was by Thomson.

== Construction ==
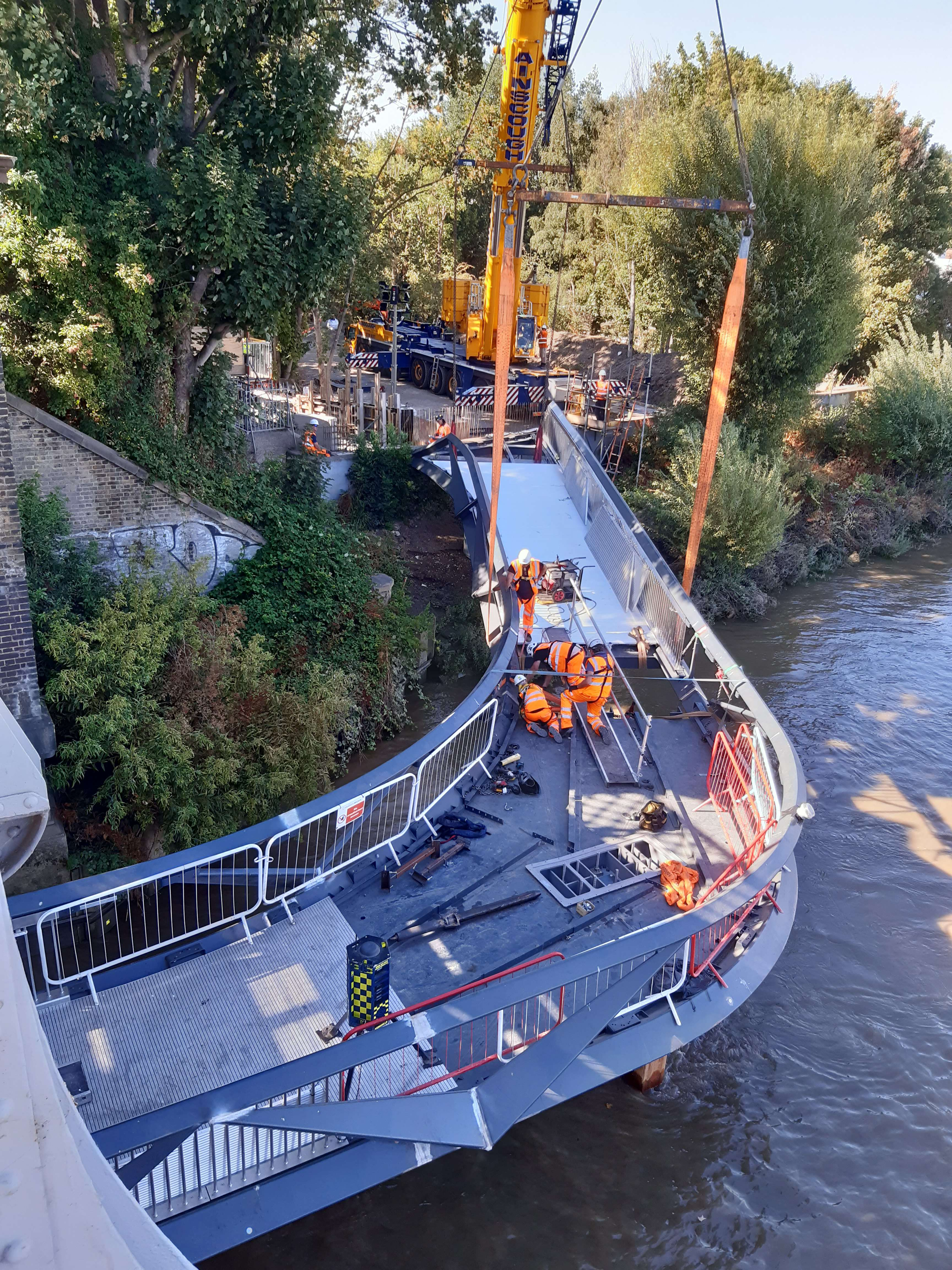
Ramp span in place, August 2022

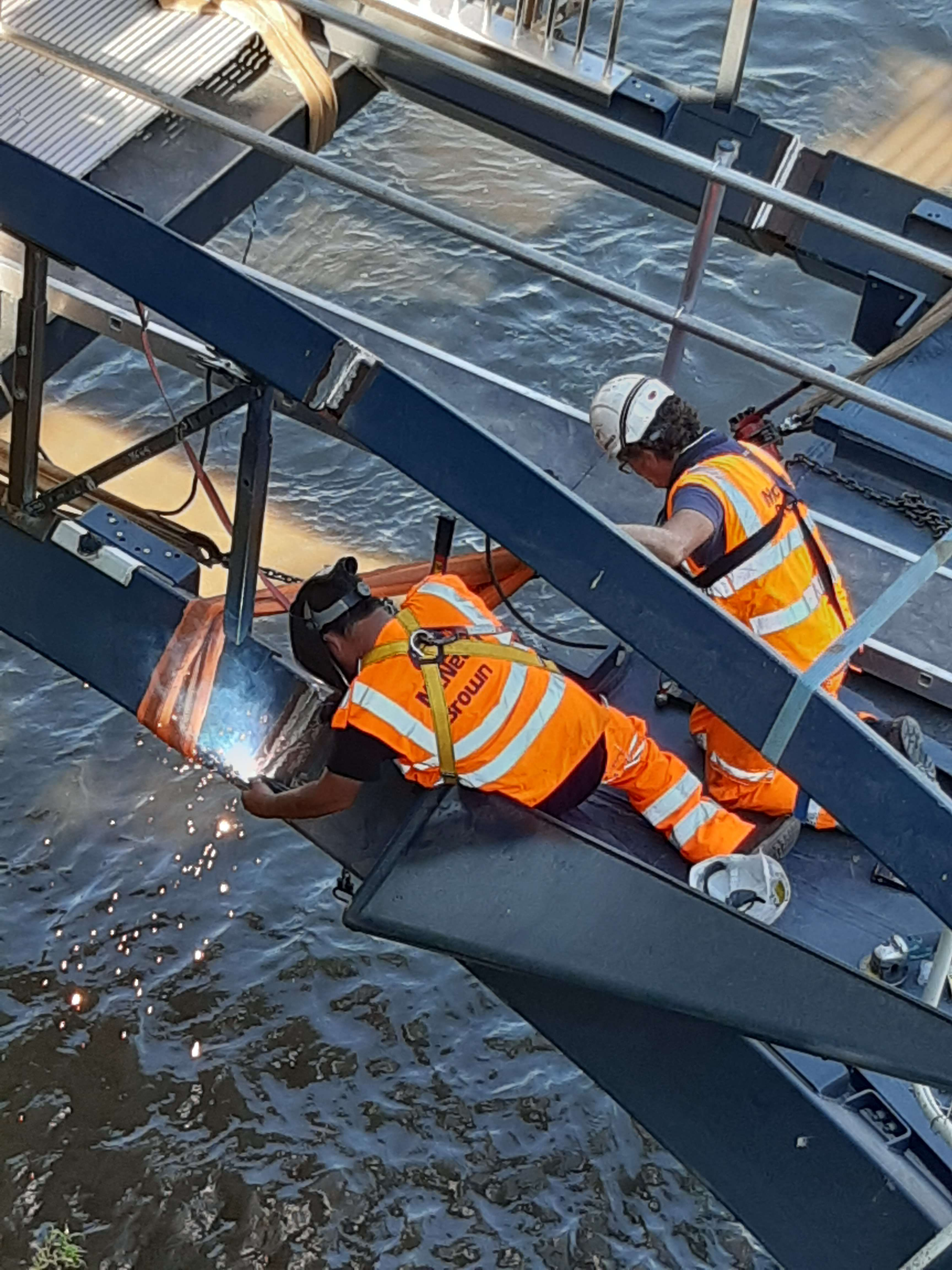
Welding ramp span to main span

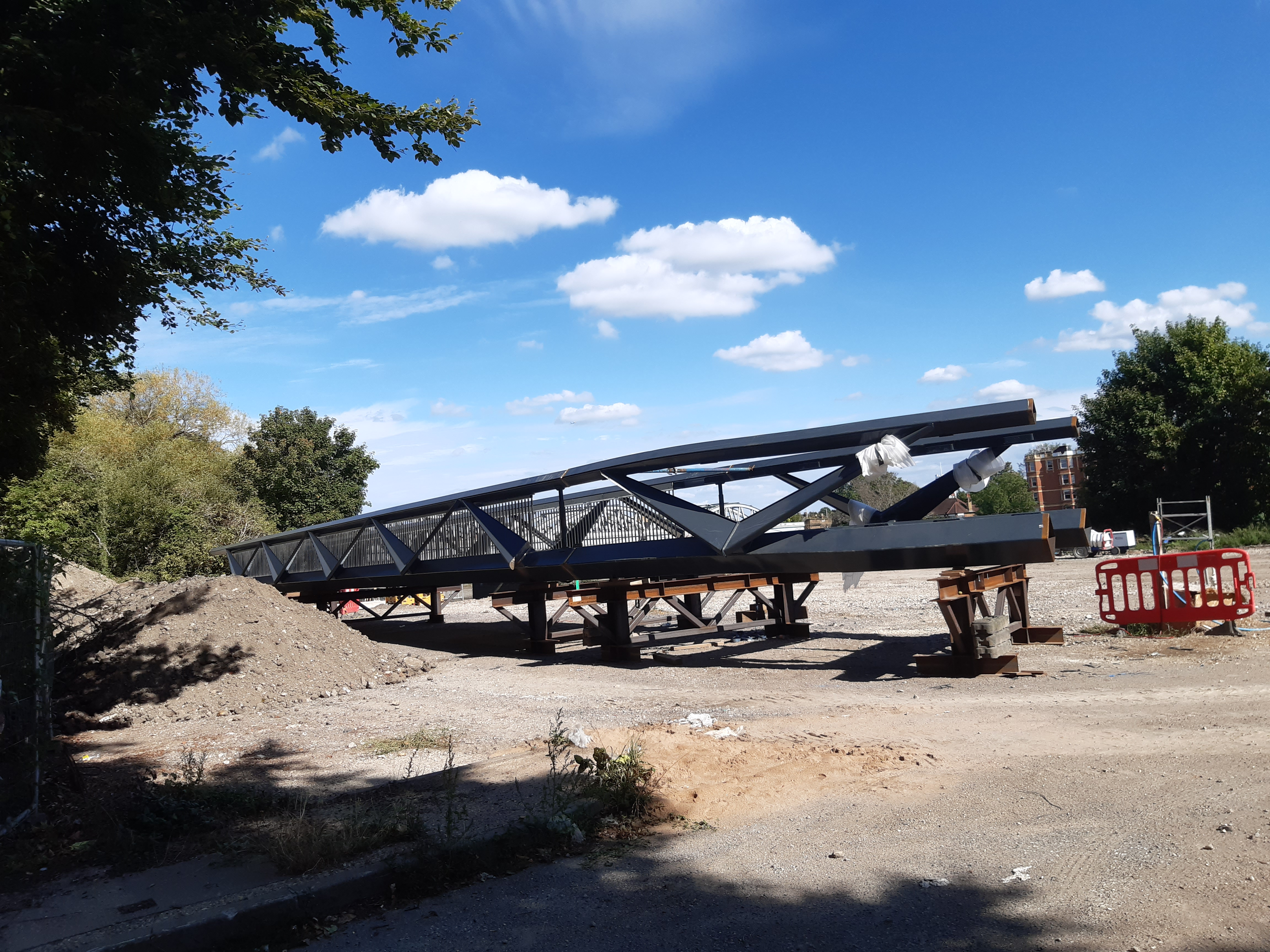
West span ready to fit

Construction was by Knights Brown. Project management and quantity surveying was by Currie & Brown. The diagonals for the main span, originally designed as solid struts, are hollow, reducing material usage and lightening the structure. The main span of the bridge was floated in at high tide on pontoons in July 2022; it was designed to settle into position on its footings when the tide went down. The bridge was completed in 2022, and opened on 13 January 2023.

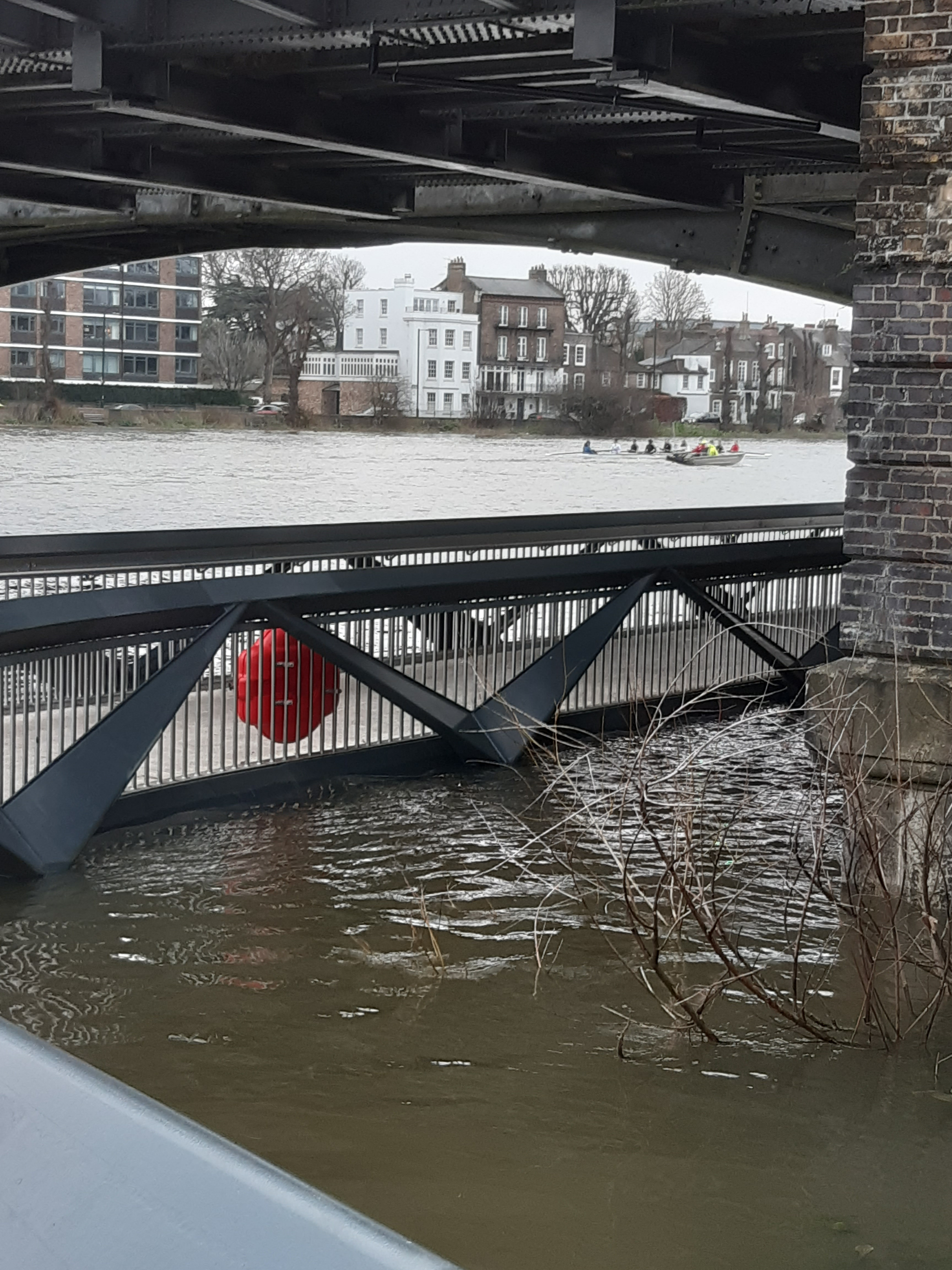
High tide and Storm Henk floodwater up to the bridge's decking, 2024
