= David Seabrook =

British crime writer and journalist (1960-2009)

- Born: 19 December 1960; Hemel Hempstead, Hertfordshire, England
- Died: 18 January 2009 (aged 48); Canterbury, Kent, England
- Education: University of Kent
- Occupations: crime writer and journalist

David Seabrook (19 December 1960 – 18 January 2009) was a British crime writer and journalist.

== Life ==
Born in 1960 at Hemel Hempstead, Hertfordshire, David was the only child of Leslie Frank Seabrook (an insurance broker) and his wife Barbara Elizabeth Daphne (Frostick). Seabrook studied English and American literature at the University of Kent at Canterbury gaining an MA with a dissertation on Marcel Proust. Subsequently, he worked as a teacher of English as a foreign language in Greece. Until his death he lived alone at Westside Apartments in Canterbury, Kent. He was discovered dead in his flat by Kent police. There is unconfirmed speculation that Seabrook was murdered; however, this has never been officially established.

== Career ==
Seabrook is known for his extensively researched books rich with literary and historical associations on previously untouched or assumedly insignificant subjects and locations.

In his book Jack of Jumps Seabrook attempts to identify Jack the Stripper, a serial killer who murdered eight prostitutes in West London in the early 1960s. Seabrook gives a meticulous account of the police work; however, the murderer remains unknown, although the book contains insinuations as to his identity.

'All the Devils Are Here' is Seabrook’s exploration of Kent’s seaside towns, intertwined with the region’s literary and celebrity history.

Seabrook also appeared in two films - 'fictional documentaries' - by Chris Petit and Iain Sinclair: The Cardinal and the Corpse (1992) and Asylum (2000).

At the time of his death, Seabrook was working on a book about the life and mysterious suicide of the show business solicitor David Jacobs.

== Works ==
- All the Devils are Here Granta Books (2002) ISBN 978-1862074835
- Jack of Jumps Granta Books (2006) ISBN 978-1862077706

== See also ==
- Goodbye Piccadilly, Farewell Leicester Square
