= Barnes Railway Bridge =

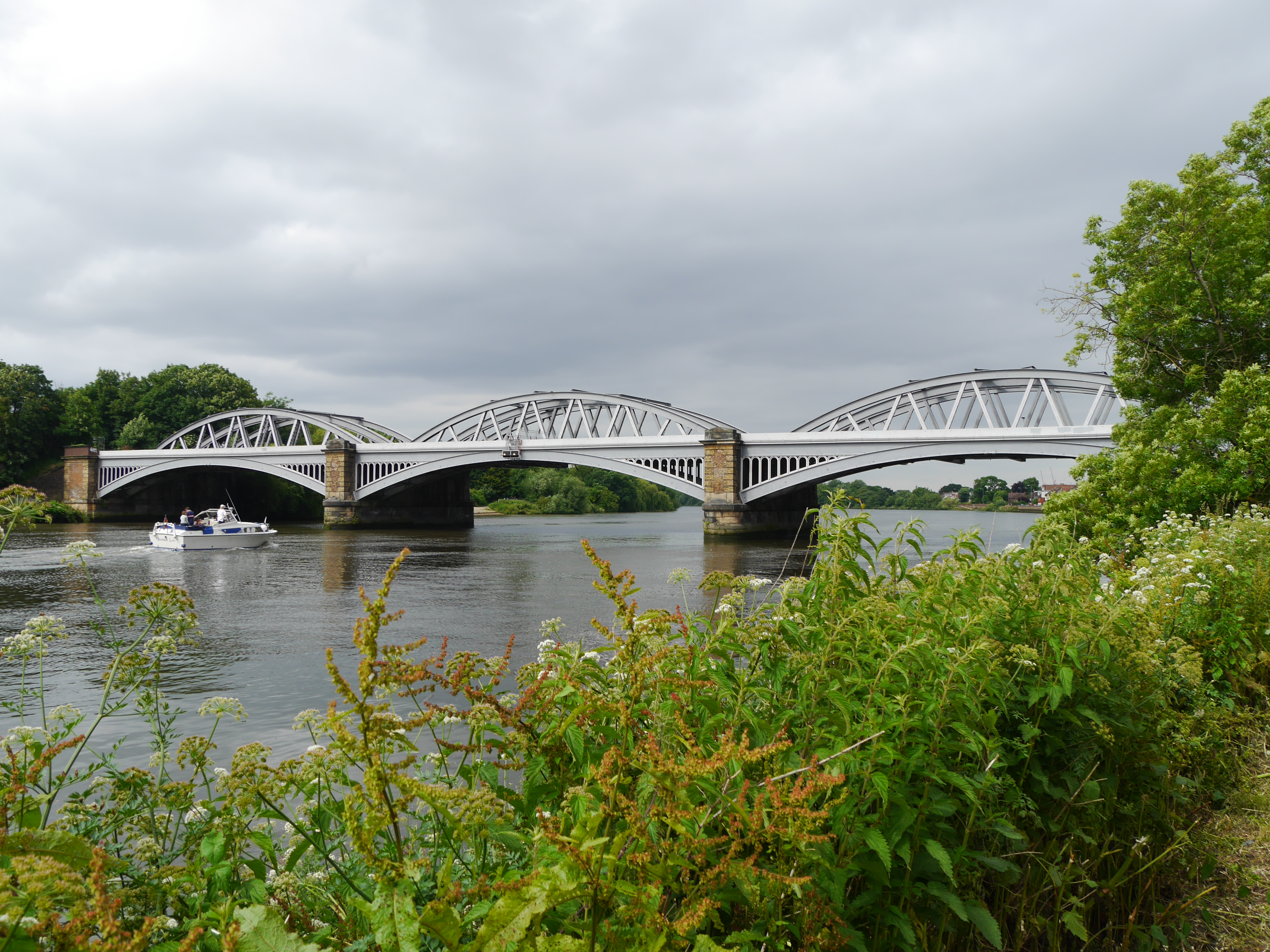
- The current bridge showing the Locke span
- Coordinates: 51°28′22″N 0°15′14″W
- Carries: Railway; Pedestrians
- Crosses: River Thames
- Locale: London, England
- Maintained by: Network Rail
- Heritage status: Grade II listed structure
- Preceded by: Chiswick Bridge
- Followed by: Hammersmith Bridge

Characteristics
- Design: Truss arch bridge

History
- Opened: 1895

Location
- Interactive map of Barnes Railway Bridge

Barnes Railway Bridge is a Grade II listed in the London Borough of Richmond upon Thames and the London Borough of Hounslow. It crosses the River Thames in London in a northwest to southeast direction at Barnes. It carries the South Western Railway's Hounslow Loop Line, and lies between Barnes Bridge and Chiswick stations. It can also be crossed on foot, and is one of only three bridges in London to combine pedestrian and rail use; the others being Hungerford Bridge and Golden Jubilee Bridges and Fulham Railway Bridge.

The original bridge at this location was constructed during the late 1849 in accordance with a design produced by the civil engineer Joseph Locke; this structure, which consisted of two pairs of cast iron arch spans, bore a considerable resemblance to the original Richmond Railway Bridge, which was also designed by Locke. On 22 August 1849, the Barnes Bridge was opened to rail traffic. While Locke's incarnation of Barnes Bridge provided relatively trouble-free service, it has not seen use since the 1890s. During the latter decade of the nineteenth century, there was a scare regarding the suitability of cast iron bridges following the collapse of one such structure. As such, it was decided that a successor to the original Barnes Bridge should be constructed.

During the 1890s, a wider replacement bridge, which was designed by Edward Andrews, was constructed by Head Wrightson on behalf of the London & South Western Railway. This structure, which was built directly alongside its predecessor, comprises three spans of wrought iron bow string girders, which carries a pair of railway tracks across the river. A pedestrian walkway was also added to the bridge at this time. The original Locke span remains standing along the up-stream side of its replacement, but is not used by any traffic. During 1983, Barnes Bridge was given protection as a Grade II listed structure. In the 2010s, the Barnes Bridge has been temporarily closed to pedestrians during the annual Oxford and Cambridge Boat Race to avoid excessive crowding on the structure.

== History ==
=== Construction ===
During the 1840s, the London and Southampton Railway Company, which was later renamed to the London and South Western Railway Company, embarked upon the development of a new railway line, which ran between Nine Elms and Richmond. A few years later, it was decided that this line should be extended through to Windsor; the new extension included the addition of loop from the village of Barnes to Chiswick and Hounslow, which necessitated the construction of what would become known as Barnes Bridge over the River Thames. Prior to the building of this structure, Barnes, which was a small settlement at that time, had never featured a river crossing.

The responsibility for designing this crossing was assigned to the noted civil engineer Joseph Locke, who also designed several other structures along the route, including the similar Richmond Railway Bridge. In order to achieve the required statutory height of the bridge above the high water mark of the Thames, as to prevent the structure impinging upon the passage of traditional river traffic, Locke determined that it would be necessary to embank the river. Furthermore, in order to accommodate the bridge's construction along the south side of the river, several properties within The Terrace, a street of modest Georgian houses, had to be demolished to provide sufficient clearance, as the structure and connecting lines pass directly through the estate. Barnes High Street is located towards the eastern side of the bridge.

As designed by Locke, Barnes Bridge consisted of two pairs of cast iron arch spans, which had a length of 36.57 meters and a rise of 3.66 meters. Each arch was cast in four individual sections, while each span was strengthened via six cast iron arch ribs, which had a depth of 915mm. These spans were supported on brick piers, which were faced in Bramley Fall stone, and carried a deck composed of timber across the river. During 1846, Fox Henderson & Co were appointed as the contractor for building the structure; work on its construction commenced shortly thereafter. The completed bridge was officially opened on 22 August 1849. However, in the present day, while elements of Locke's incarnation of Barnes Bridge remain in situ, it is no longer in use for rail traffic, having been replaced by a newer structure built alongside.

=== Widening and reconstruction ===
Towards the end of the nineteenth century, several engineers and officials had come to question the viable lifespan and long term stability of cast iron structures, such as the original Barnes Bridge. These fears had been largely motivated by the collapse of a cast iron span along the Brighton Main Line during 1891. Amid these concerns, in July 1891, an Act of Parliament was approved for the replacement of Barnes Bridge by a structure principally composed of wrought iron.

However, as a consequence of the company's strong desire for train services continue over the existing structure throughout the construction of its replacement, the new incarnation of Barnes Bridge was built alongside and the need for the complete dismantlement of Locke's original bridge was thereby avoided. Accordingly, following the new structure's completion, a single complete pair of spans of the original bridge remained, along with one span of the other pair directly adjacent to the first span.

The new Barnes Bridge was designed by the civil engineer Edward Andrews and built by the contractor Head, Wrightson & Co. It consisted of three spans of wrought iron bow string girders, which were supported by extended piers and abutments. During 1894, work began on the extension of the existing brick abutments and piers; the new structure was completed during the following year. In conjunction with this work, a single footpath, possessing a width of 2.4 meters, was also added to the structure. Both the footpath and the second incarnation of Barnes Bridge have remained in use through to the present day. In late November and early December 2022 the bridge was closed to rail traffic for urgent repairs, and reopened in September 2025

=== University Boat Race ===
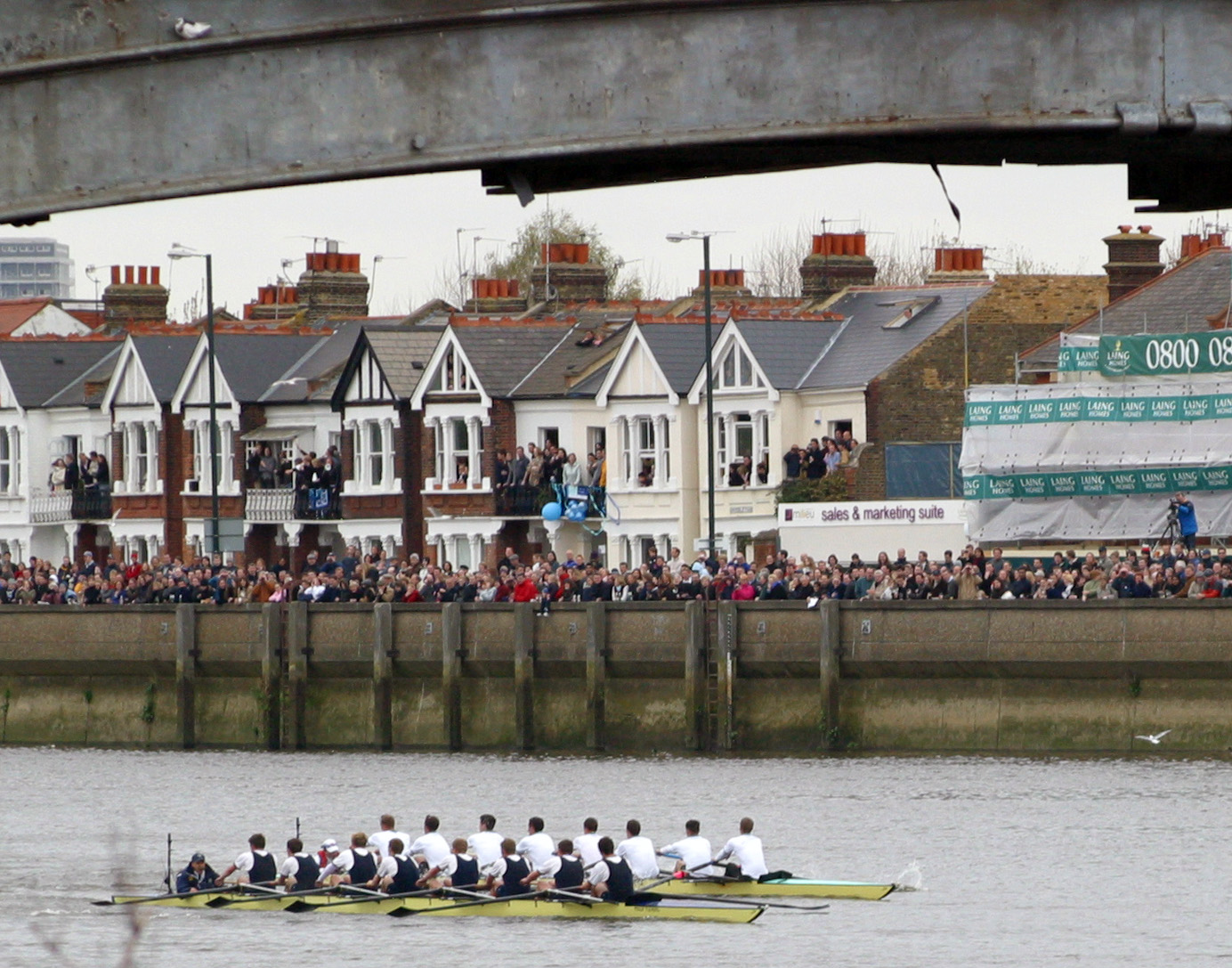
The Boat Race approaching Barnes Bridge. viewed from the Middlesex (north) bank in 2003 – Oxford won by only one foot

Over time, Barnes Bridge has become a recognisable landmark on the Thames. It is commonly referenced during the annual Oxford and Cambridge Boat Race, where it has been suggested that whichever crew is ahead at this point will go on to win the race. During 2003, the competing crews were in almost equal position approaching the bridge, and Oxford won the race by just one foot. In recognition of its association with the boat races, the coat of arms on Barnes Bridge includes a light blue oar (representing Cambridge University) and a dark blue oar (representing Oxford University). During the first half of the twentieth century, it became common for the railway company to sell tickets to race spectators for access to the bridge as a means of generating revenue from the provision of a unique vantage point. However, in the twentyfirst century, Barnes Bridge has been intentionally closed to pedestrian traffic during the boat race on the grounds of public safety.

=== Footbridges ===
The presence of Barnes Bridge has forced the diversion of the Thames Path, a pedestrian walkway along the banks of the Thames, as there is limited space between the bridge and the river to the point where a traditional footpath could not be provided. During November 2017, an application for planning permission was submitted to Hounslow London Borough Council which proposed the construction of a bespoke pedestrian footbridge spanning along the bank of the Thames beneath Barnes Bridge, as a means of eliminating the need for a diversionary route in the future. Additionally, plans have been mooted for the reuse of the long out of use Locke structure, under which it is to be converted into a garden walkway; the ambition has reportedly attracted the support of national network infrastructure company Network Rail.

The Dukes Meadows Footbridge, underneath the northern span of Barnes Railway Bridge, was opened in 2023 to allow the Thames Path to run beside the river at this point, rather than taking a detour of hundreds of metres to the nearest foot tunnel. The architects of that footbridge, Moxon, have also drawn up plans for a landscaped "green walkway" accessed by ramps on the disused 1849 railway bridge spans, joining up with the Thames Path. The project is supported by Network Rail, the London Borough of Richmond and the London Borough of Hounslow.

== Gallery ==
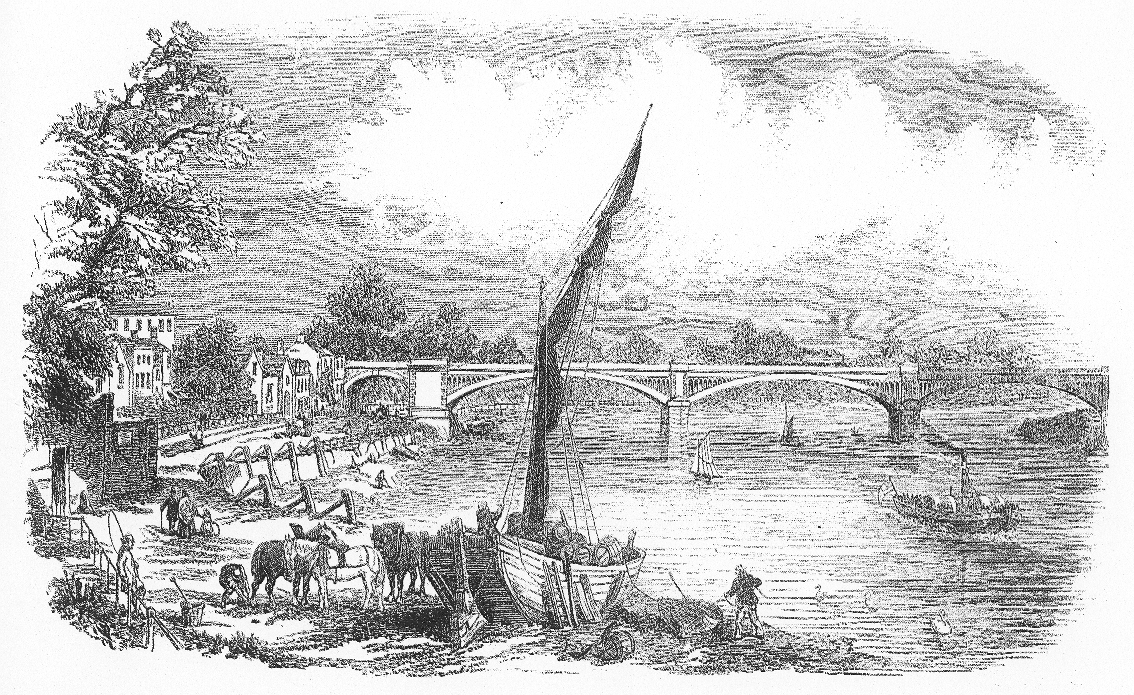
The first Barnes Bridge, c. 1849

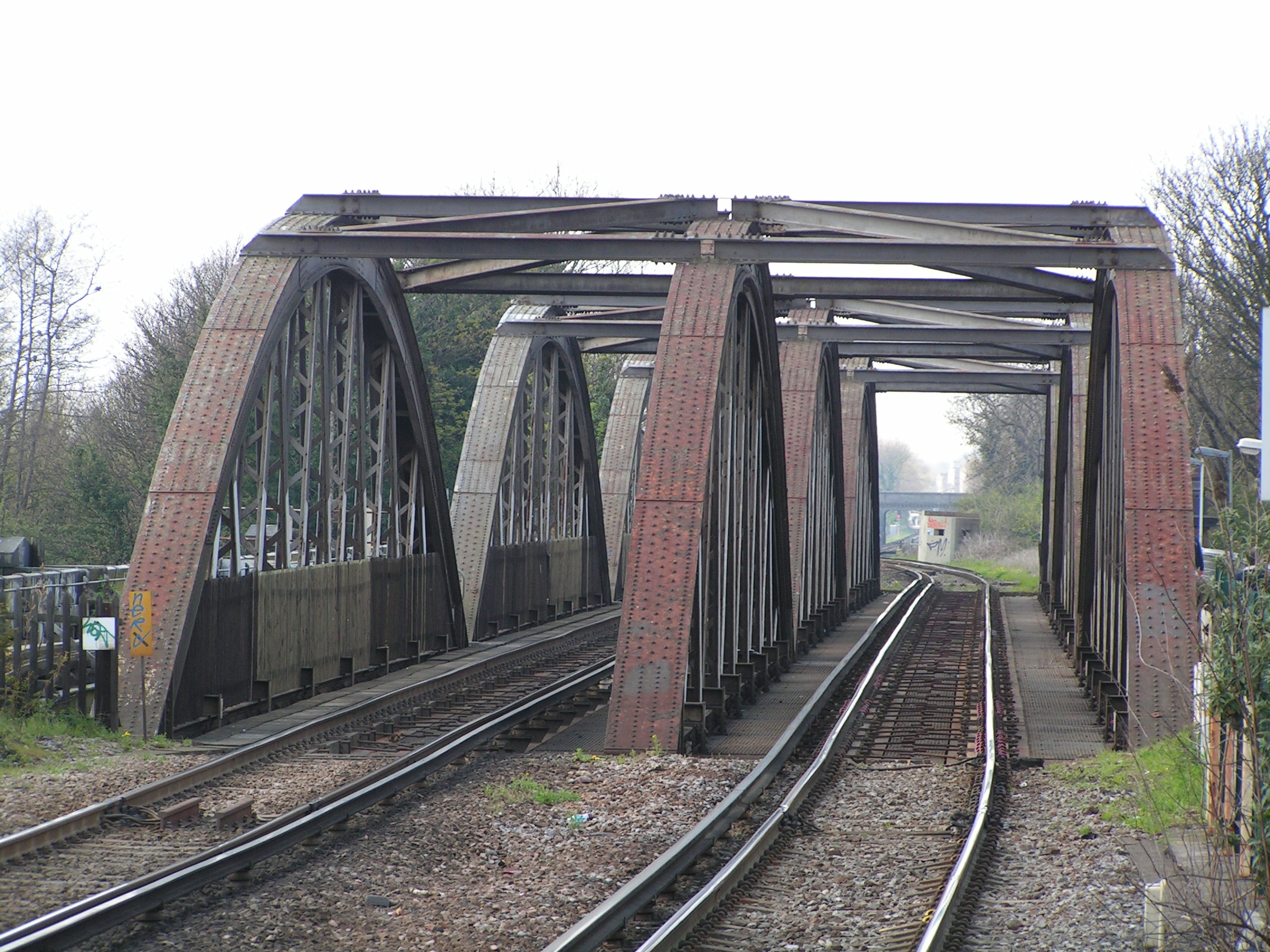
The current bridge from Barnes Bridge Station

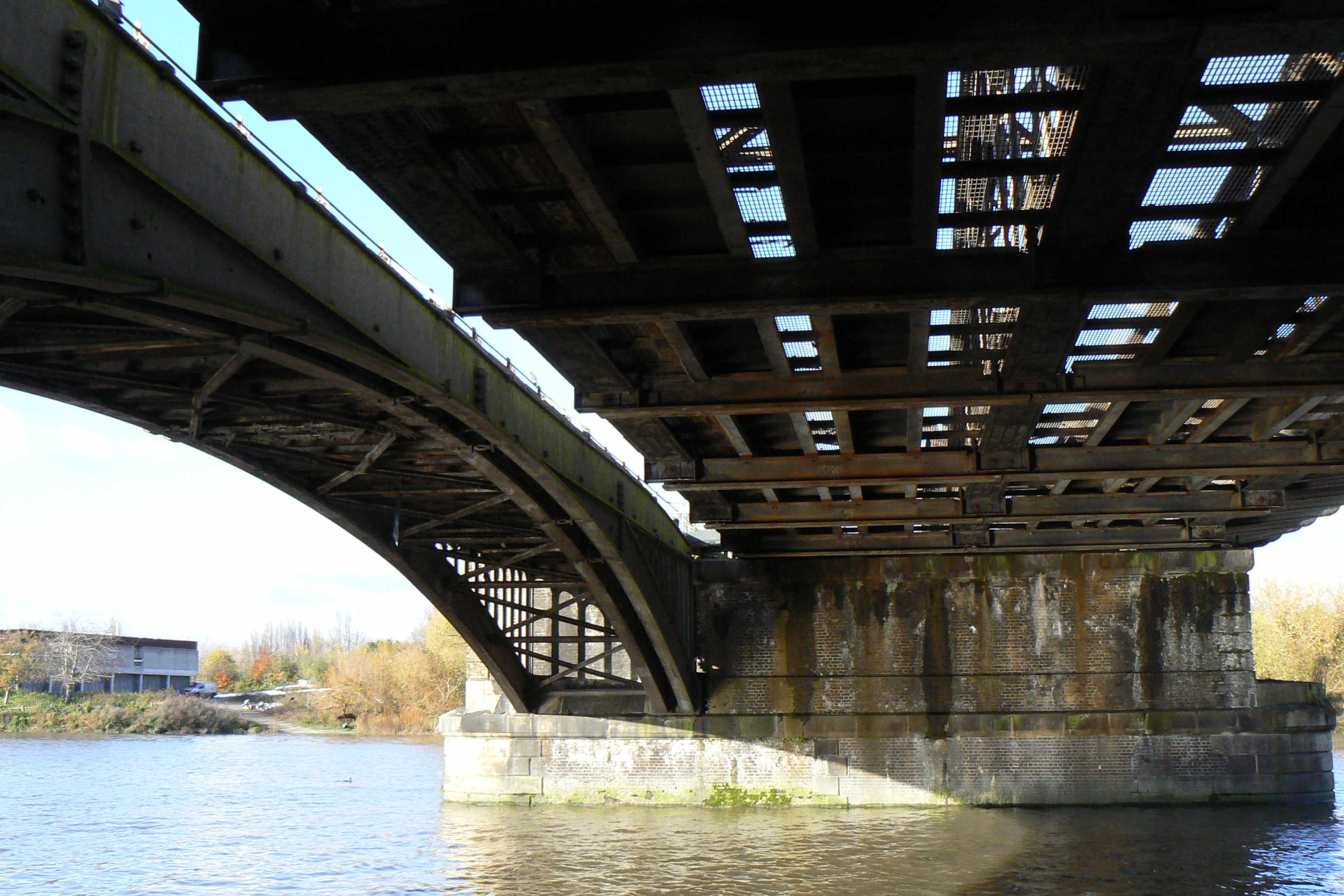
Barnes Railway Bridge – view under decks showing the old disused span on the left

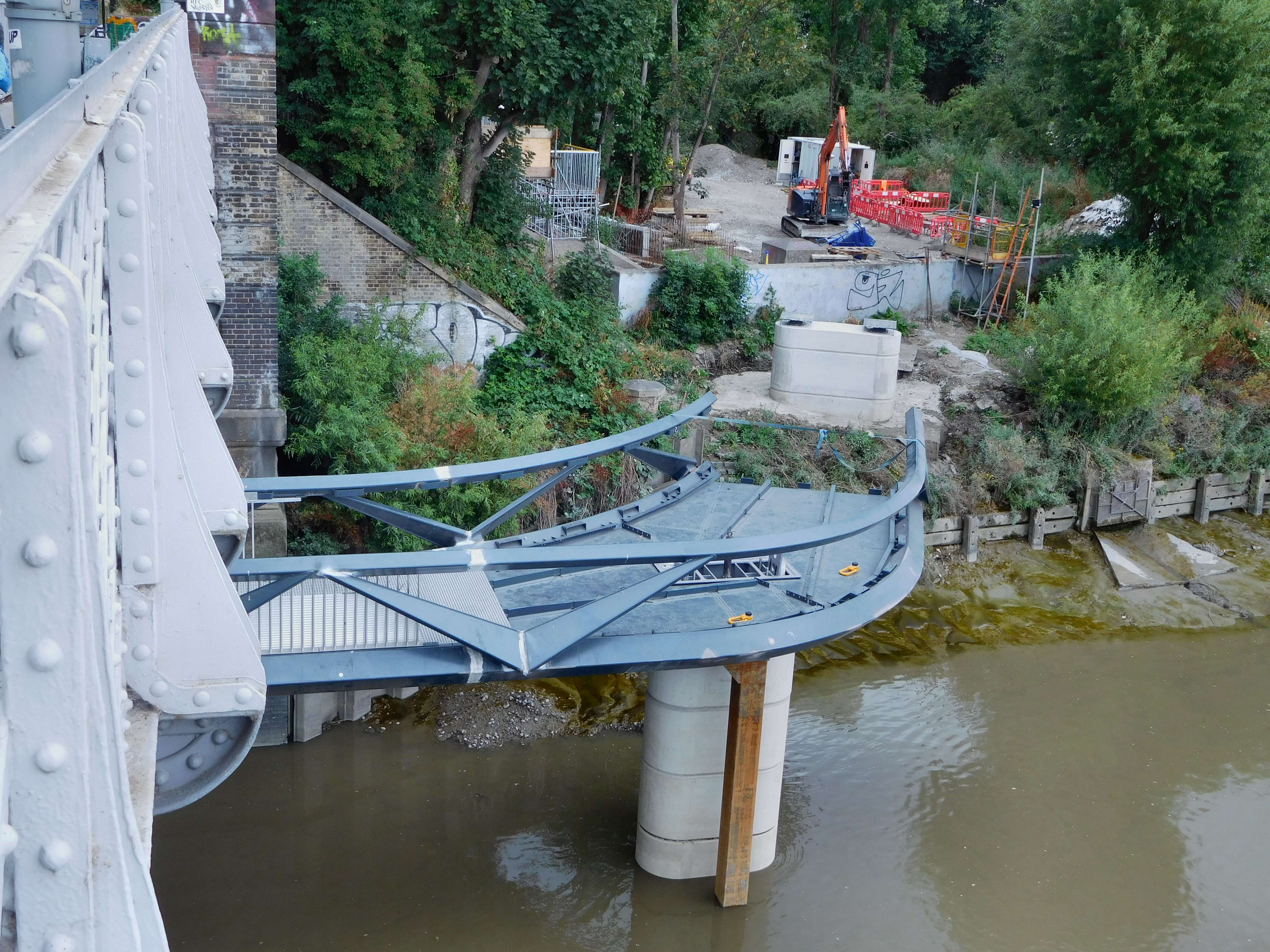
Dukes Meadows Footbridge under construction, 2022

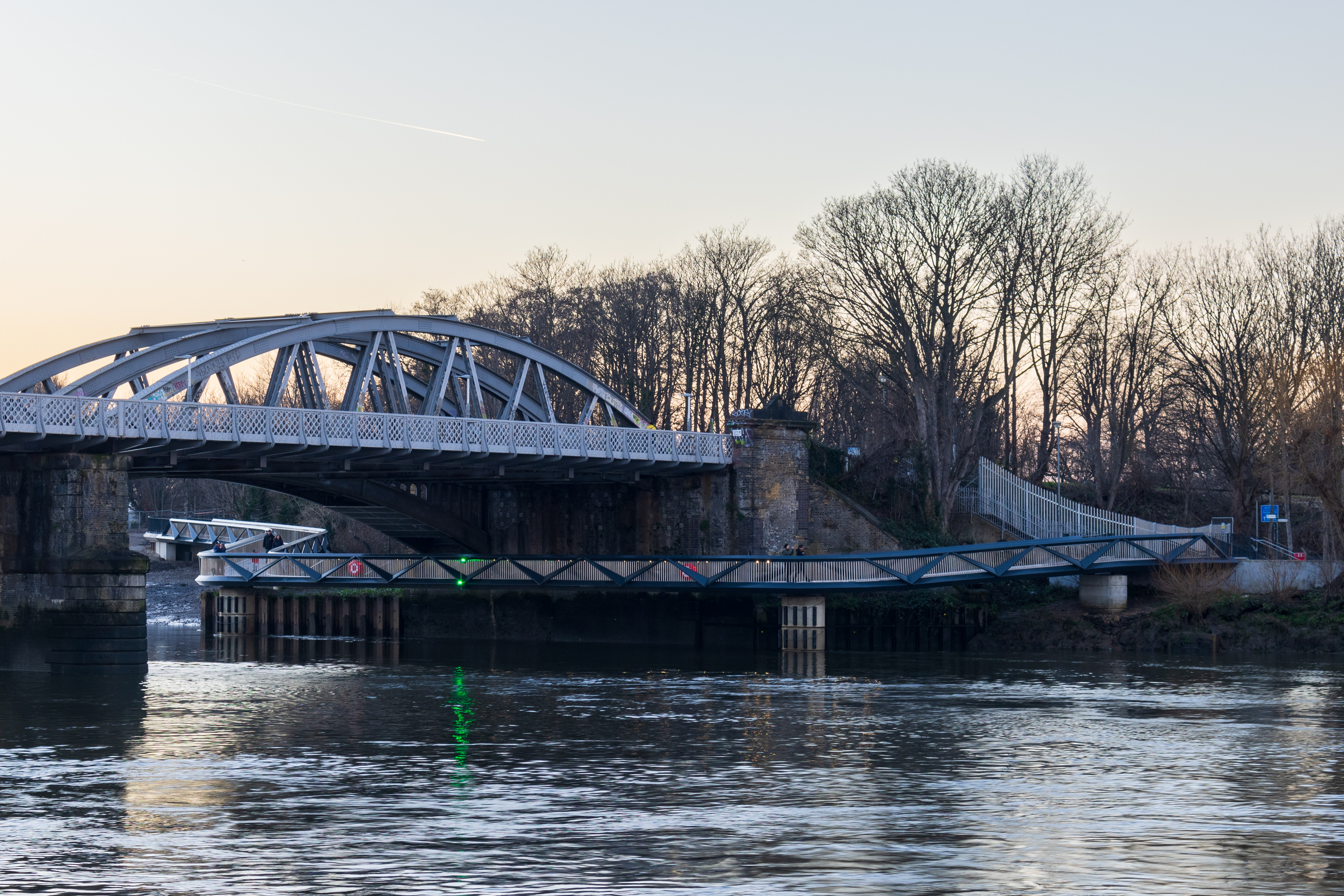
Completed Dukes Meadows Footbridge seen below Barnes Railway Bridge

== See also ==
- Crossings of the River Thames
- List of bridges in London
