= Lent Bumps 2007 =

The Lent Bumps 2007 was a series of rowing races held at Cambridge University from Tuesday 27 February 2007 until Saturday 3 March 2007. The event was run as a bumps race and was the last set in the series of Lent Bumps which have been held annually in late-February or early March in this form since 1887. See Lent Bumps for the format of the races. In 2007, a total of 121 crews took part (69 men's crews and 52 women's crews), with nearly 1100 participants in total.

== Head of the River crews ==
1st & 3rd Trinity men took the Headship ending Caius's 19-day defence by bumping them on the 1st day.

1st & 3rd Trinity women bumped Emmanuel, Caius and Clare to take the headship for the first ever time.

1st & 3rd Trinity became only the second club ever in Cambridge bumps history to hold a double headship. Caius had previously held a double-headship in the May Bumps for 2000 and 2002 and in the Lent Bumps 2003.

== Highest 2nd VIIIs ==
Lady Margaret II were the highest 2nd VIII at the end of the week for the 2nd consecutive year, rowing over in front of Caius II on the last two days.

The highest women's 2nd VIII at the end of the week for the 7th consecutive year was Jesus II, the longest run in bumps history.

== Links to races in other years ==
| Preceding year | Current year | Following year |
|---|---|---|
| Lent Bumps 2006 | Lent Bumps 2007 | Lent Bumps 2008 |
| May Bumps 2006 | May Bumps 2007 | May Bumps 2008 |

== Bumps Charts ==
Below are the bumps charts all 4 men's and all 3 women's divisions, with the men's event on the left and women's event on the right. The bumps chart represents the progress of every crew over all four days of the racing. To follow the progress of any particular crew, simply find the crew's name on the left side of the chart and follow the line to the end-of-the-week finishing position on the right of the chart.

Note that this chart may not be displayed correctly if you are using a large font size on your browser. A simple way to check is to see that the first horizontal bold line, marking the boundary between divisions, lies between positions 17 and 18.

| Pos | Crew | Men's Bumps Chart | Crew | Pos | Crew | Women's Bumps Chart | Crew | Pos |
|---|---|---|---|---|---|---|---|---|
| 1 | Caius | | 1st & 3rd Trinity | 1 | Clare | | 1st & 3rd Trinity | 1 |
| 2 | 1st & 3rd Trinity | | Jesus | 2 | Caius | | Jesus | 2 |
| 3 | Downing | | Caius | 3 | Emmanuel | | Clare | 3 |
| 4 | Jesus | | Lady Margaret | 4 | 1st & 3rd Trinity | | Emmanuel | 4 |
| 5 | Lady Margaret | | Downing | 5 | Downing | | Caius | 5 |
| 6 | Churchill | | Emmanuel | 6 | Jesus | | Downing | 6 |
| 7 | Emmanuel | | Trinity Hall | 7 | Newnham | | Lady Margaret | 7 |
| 8 | Queens' | | Clare | 8 | Lady Margaret | | Newnham | 8 |
| 9 | Trinity Hall | | Churchill | 9 | Trinity Hall | | Churchill | 9 |
| 10 | Clare | | Pembroke | 10 | Girton | | Girton | 10 |
| 11 | Pembroke | | King's | 11 | Churchill | | Pembroke | 11 |
| 12 | Selwyn | | Queens' | 12 | Selwyn | | Queens' | 12 |
| 13 | Christ's | | Fitzwilliam | 13 | Pembroke | | Trinity Hall | 13 |
| 14 | King's | | Christ's | 14 | Queens' | | Fitzwilliam | 14 |
| 15 | Fitzwilliam | | Selwyn | 15 | New Hall | | Christ's | 15 |
| 16 | Robinson | | Magdalene | 16 | Fitzwilliam | | Selwyn | 16 |
| 17 | Lady Margaret II | | Robinson | 17 | Christ's | | St. Catharine's | 17 |
| 18 | St. Catharine's | | Lady Margaret II | 18 | Robinson | | Peterhouse | 18 |
| 19 | Magdalene | | Caius II | 19 | King's | | New Hall | 19 |
| 20 | Caius II | | Wolfson | 20 | St. Catharine's | | Robinson | 20 |
| 21 | Girton | | 1st & 3rd Trinity II | 21 | Jesus II | | Jesus II | 21 |
| 22 | Wolfson | | St. Catharine's | 22 | Peterhouse | | King's | 22 |
| 23 | Sidney Sussex | | Girton | 23 | Sidney Sussex | | CCAT | 23 |
| 24 | Peterhouse | | Peterhouse | 24 | Lady Margaret II | | Lady Margaret II | 24 |
| 25 | 1st & 3rd Trinity II | | Jesus II | 25 | Darwin | | Sidney Sussex | 25 |
| 26 | Darwin | | Sidney Sussex | 26 | Magdalene | | Emmanuel II | 26 |
| 27 | Downing II | | Corpus Christi | 27 | CCAT | | Darwin | 27 |
| 28 | Jesus II | | Emmanuel II | 28 | Wolfson | | Magdalene | 28 |
| 29 | CCAT | | Darwin | 29 | Caius II | | Pembroke II | 29 |
| 30 | Corpus Christi | | Churchill II | 30 | Emmanuel II | | Wolfson | 30 |
| 31 | Queens' II | | Downing II | 31 | Newnham II | | St Edmund's | 31 |
| 32 | Emmanuel II | | Pembroke II | 32 | St Edmund's | | Caius II | 32 |
| 33 | Churchill II | | CCAT | 33 | Pembroke II | | Homerton | 33 |
| 34 | Pembroke II | | Homerton | 34 | Corpus Christi | | Newnham II | 34 |
| 35 | Trinity Hall II | | Queens' II | 35 | Queens' II | | Corpus Christi | 35 |
| 36 | Robinson II | | Selwyn II | 36 | Homerton | | Lucy Cavendish | 36 |
| 37 | Selwyn II | | 1st & 3rd Trinity III | 37 | St. Catharine's II | | Clare II | 37 |
| 38 | Homerton | | Trinity Hall II | 38 | New Hall II | | Queens' II | 38 |
| 39 | Christ's II | | Jesus III | 39 | Lucy Cavendish | | 1st & 3rd Trinity II | 39 |
| 40 | 1st & 3rd Trinity III | | Robinson II | 40 | Girton II | | St. Catharine's II | 40 |
| 41 | Lady Margaret III | | Fitzwilliam II | 41 | Clare II | | Girton II | 41 |
| 42 | Jesus III | | Christ's II | 42 | Clare Hall | | New Hall II | 42 |
| 43 | Caius III | | Lady Margaret III | 43 | 1st & 3rd Trinity II | | Selwyn II | 43 |
| 44 | Clare II | | Girton II | 44 | Downing II | | Trinity Hall II | 44 |
| 45 | Fitzwilliam II | | Caius III | 45 | Trinity Hall II | | Pembroke III | 45 |
| 46 | 1st & 3rd Trinity IV | | St Edmund's | 46 | CCAT II | | Clare Hall | 46 |
| 47 | St. Catharine's II | | Clare II | 47 | Selwyn II | | Christ's II | 47 |
| 48 | St Edmund's | | Peterhouse II | 48 | Pembroke III | | Downing II | 48 |
| 49 | Peterhouse II | | 1st & 3rd Trinity IV | 49 | Emmanuel III | | CCAT II | 49 |
| 50 | Girton II | | Magdalene II | 50 | 1st & 3rd Trinity III | | Emmanuel III | 50 |
| 51 | Queens' III | | St. Catharine's II | 51 | Christ's II | | Pembroke IV | 51 |
| 52 | Magdalene II | | Downing III | 52 | Pembroke IV | | 1st & 3rd Trinity III | 52 |
| 53 | Downing III | | Queens' III | 53 | | | | |
| 54 | Sidney Sussex II | | Clare Hall | 54 | | | | |
| 55 | Clare Hall | | Wolfson II | 55 | | | | |
| 56 | Lady Margaret IV | | King's II | 56 | | | | |
| 57 | Hughes Hall | | Hughes Hall | 57 | | | | |
| 58 | King's II | | Sidney Sussex II | 58 | | | | |
| 59 | Selwyn III | | Emmanuel III | 59 | | | | |
| 60 | Wolfson II | | Lady Margaret IV | 60 | | | | |
| 61 | Emmanuel III | | Selwyn III | 61 | | | | |
| 62 | Christ's III | | Churchill III | 62 | | | | |
| 63 | Pembroke III | | Christ's III | 63 | | | | |
| 64 | CCAT II | | 1st & 3rd Trinity V | 64 | | | | |
| 65 | 1st & 3rd Trinity V | | CCAT II | 65 | | | | |
| 66 | Churchill III | | Homerton II | 66 | | | | |
| 67 | Girton III | | Pembroke III | 67 | | | | |
| 68 | Homerton II | | Christ's IV | 68 | | | | |
| 69 | Christ's IV | | Girton III | 69 | | | | |

== The Getting-on Race ==
The Getting-on Race (GoR) allows a number of crews which did not already have a place from last year's races to compete for the right to race this year. Up to ten crews are removed from the bottom of last year's finishing order, who must then race alongside new entrants to decide which crews gain a place (with one bumps place per 3 crews competing, subject to the maximum of 10 available places).

The 2007 Lent Bumps Getting-on Race took place on 23 February 2007.

A total of 17 men's and 24 women's crews took part, competing for the bottom 6 men's spaces and bottom 8 women's spaces in the main bumps races.

=== Successful crews ===
The successful crews were (in the order that they were put onto the main start order);

==== Men ====
- CCAT II
- 1st & 3rd Trinity V
- Churchill III
- Girton III
- Homerton II
- Christ's IV

==== Women ====
- Trinity Hall II
- CCAT II
- Selwyn II
- Pembroke III
- Emmanuel III
- 1st & 3rd Trinity III
- Christ's II
- Pembroke IV
