= Lent Bumps 2009 =

The Lent Bumps 2009 is a series of rowing races held at Cambridge University from Tuesday 24 February 2009 until Saturday 28 February 2009. The event was run as a bumps race and was the 122nd in the series of Lent Bumps which have been held annually in late-February or early March in this form since 1887. See Lent Bumps for the format of the races. 122 crews took part (69 men's crews and 52 women's crews), with nearly 1100 participants in total.

Two clubs changed their names in the 2009 Lent Bumps. New Hall became Murray Edwards reflecting the college name change. CCAT became Anglia Ruskin reflecting the university's name change in 2005.

== Head of the River crews ==
1st & 3rd Trinity Boat Club

1st & 3rd Trinity men rowed over each day to retain the headship for a third consecutive year.

Emmanuel women bumped 1st & 3rd Trinity on the first day to take the Lents headship for the first time since 2002.

== Highest 2nd VIIIs ==
1st & 3rd Trinity II finished as the highest placed men's second VIII, although they dropped into the 2nd division.

Jesus II finished as the highest placed women's second VIII, although they dropped into the 2nd division.

== Links to races in other years ==
| Preceding year | Current year | Following year |
|---|---|---|
| Lent Bumps 2008 | Lent Bumps 2009 | Lent Bumps 2010 |
| May Bumps 2008 | May Bumps 2009 | May Bumps 2010 |

== Bumps Charts ==
Below are the bumps charts all 4 men's and all 3 women's divisions, with the men's event on the left and women's event on the right. The bumps chart represents the progress of every crew over all four days of the racing. To follow the progress of any particular crew, simply find the crew's name on the left side of the chart and follow the line to the end-of-the-week finishing position on the right of the chart.

Note that this chart may not be displayed correctly if you are using a large font size on your browser. A simple way to check is to see that the first horizontal bold line, marking the boundary between divisions, lies between positions 17 and 18. The combined Hughes Hall/Lucy Cavendish women's crews are listed as Lucy Cavendish only.

| Pos | Crew | Men's Bumps Chart | Crew | Pos | Crew | Women's Bumps Chart | Crew | Pos |
|---|---|---|---|---|---|---|---|---|
| 1 | 1st & 3rd Trinity | | 1st & 3rd Trinity | 1 | 1st & 3rd Trinity | | Emmanuel | 1 |
| 2 | Lady Margaret | | Downing | 2 | Emmanuel | | 1st & 3rd Trinity | 2 |
| 3 | Downing | | Lady Margaret | 3 | Jesus | | Jesus | 3 |
| 4 | Jesus | | Clare | 4 | Caius | | Downing | 4 |
| 5 | Clare | | Pembroke | 5 | Downing | | Caius | 5 |
| 6 | Pembroke | | Jesus | 6 | Clare | | Queens' | 6 |
| 7 | Caius | | Trinity Hall | 7 | Pembroke | | Christ's | 7 |
| 8 | Emmanuel | | Caius | 8 | Lady Margaret | | Pembroke | 8 |
| 9 | King's | | Emmanuel | 9 | Queens' | | Lady Margaret | 9 |
| 10 | Fitzwilliam | | Fitzwilliam | 10 | Churchill | | Clare | 10 |
| 11 | Trinity Hall | | Magdalene | 11 | Christ's | | St. Catharine's | 11 |
| 12 | Christ's | | King's | 12 | Newnham | | King's | 12 |
| 13 | Churchill | | Queens' | 13 | St. Catharine's | | Churchill | 13 |
| 14 | Magdalene | | Christ's | 14 | Girton | | Trinity Hall | 14 |
| 15 | Queens' | | Churchill | 15 | King's | | Selwyn | 15 |
| 16 | 1st & 3rd Trinity II | | Girton | 16 | Trinity Hall | | Newnham | 16 |
| 17 | Selwyn | | Peterhouse | 17 | Jesus II | | Peterhouse | 17 |
| 18 | Lady Margaret II | | 1st & 3rd Trinity II | 18 | Fitzwilliam | | Girton | 18 |
| 19 | Robinson | | Selwyn | 19 | Selwyn | | Jesus II | 19 |
| 20 | Girton | | Robinson | 20 | Lady Margaret II | | Magdalene | 20 |
| 21 | Peterhouse | | Lady Margaret II | 21 | Peterhouse | | Fitzwilliam | 21 |
| 22 | Caius II | | Caius II | 22 | Emmanuel II | | Lady Margaret II | 22 |
| 23 | Jesus II | | St. Catharine's | 23 | Robinson | | Emmanuel II | 23 |
| 24 | Wolfson | | Jesus II | 24 | Magdalene | | Sidney Sussex | 24 |
| 25 | Corpus Christi | | Wolfson | 25 | Murray Edwards | | Robinson | 25 |
| 26 | St. Catharine's | | Sidney Sussex | 26 | Pembroke II | | Pembroke II | 26 |
| 27 | Sidney Sussex | | Homerton | 27 | Anglia Ruskin | | Anglia Ruskin | 27 |
| 28 | Downing II | | Corpus Christi | 28 | Sidney Sussex | | Murray Edwards | 28 |
| 29 | Pembroke II | | Darwin | 29 | Caius II | | Caius II | 29 |
| 30 | Emmanuel II | | Pembroke II | 30 | Darwin | | Homerton | 30 |
| 31 | Homerton | | Downing II | 31 | Homerton | | Lucy Cavendish | 31 |
| 32 | Darwin | | Queens' II | 32 | St Edmund's | | Corpus Christi | 32 |
| 33 | 1st & 3rd Trinity III | | 1st & 3rd Trinity III | 33 | Lucy Cavendish | | Darwin | 33 |
| 34 | Churchill II | | Emmanuel II | 34 | Wolfson | | 1st & 3rd Trinity II | 34 |
| 35 | Queens' II | | Christ's II | 35 | Corpus Christi | | Clare II | 35 |
| 36 | Anglia Ruskin | | Selwyn II | 36 | 1st & 3rd Trinity II | | St Edmund's | 36 |
| 37 | Selwyn II | | Churchill II | 37 | Newnham II | | Wolfson | 37 |
| 38 | Christ's II | | St Edmund's | 38 | Clare II | | Queens' II | 38 |
| 39 | Jesus III | | Anglia Ruskin | 39 | Selwyn II | | Selwyn II | 39 |
| 40 | Girton II | | Jesus III | 40 | Clare Hall | | Sidney Sussex II | 40 |
| 41 | Trinity Hall II | | Robinson II | 41 | Queens' II | | Christ's II | 41 |
| 42 | St Edmund's | | Lady Margaret III | 42 | Pembroke III | | Clare Hall | 42 |
| 43 | Robinson II | | Trinity Hall II | 43 | Christ's II | | Newnham II | 43 |
| 44 | Lady Margaret III | | Magdalene II | 44 | Sidney Sussex II | | Emmanuel III | 44 |
| 45 | Fitzwilliam II | | Girton II | 45 | Trinity Hall II | | St. Catharine's II | 45 |
| 46 | Clare II | | Peterhouse II | 46 | Emmanuel III | | Pembroke III | 46 |
| 47 | 1st & 3rd Trinity IV | | Clare II | 47 | Downing II | | Magdalene II | 47 |
| 48 | Magdalene II | | 1st & 3rd Trinity IV | 48 | St. Catharine's II | | Downing II | 48 |
| 49 | Caius III | | Fitzwilliam II | 49 | Magdalene II | | Trinity Hall II | 49 |
| 50 | Peterhouse II | | Caius III | 50 | Sidney Sussex III | | Fitzwilliam II | 50 |
| 51 | St. Catharine's II | | King's II | 51 | Fitzwilliam II | | Churchill II | 51 |
| 52 | Queens' III | | Wolfson II | 52 | Churchill II | | Sidney Sussex III | 52 |
| 53 | Clare Hall | | St. Catharine's II | 53 | | | | |
| 54 | Wolfson II | | Queens' III | 54 | | | | |
| 55 | King's II | | Hughes Hall | 55 | | | | |
| 56 | Downing III | | Clare Hall | 56 | | | | |
| 57 | Hughes Hall | | Anglia Ruskin II | 57 | | | | |
| 58 | Sidney Sussex II | | Sidney Sussex II | 58 | | | | |
| 59 | Selwyn III | | Homerton II | 59 | | | | |
| 60 | Anglia Ruskin II | | Downing III | 60 | | | | |
| 61 | Emmanuel III | | Lady Margaret IV | 61 | | | | |
| 62 | Homerton II | | Christ's III | 62 | | | | |
| 63 | Lady Margaret IV | | Selwyn III | 63 | | | | |
| 64 | Churchill III | | Emmanuel III | 64 | | | | |
| 65 | Christ's III | | Magdalene III | 65 | | | | |
| 66 | Corpus Christi II | | Corpus Christi II | 66 | | | | |
| 67 | Magdalene III | | Churchill III | 67 | | | | |
| 68 | Lady Margaret V | | Christ's IV | 68 | | | | |
| 69 | Christ's IV | | Lady Margaret V | 69 | | | | |
