= Lent Bumps 2010 =

The Lent Bumps 2010 was a series of rowing races held at Cambridge University from Tuesday 23 February 2010 until Saturday 27 February 2010. The event was run as a bumps race and was the 123rd in the series of Lent Bumps which have been held annually in late-February or early March in this form since 1887. See Lent Bumps for the format of the races. In 2010, 122 crews took part (69 men's crews and 52 women's crews) with nearly 1100 participants in total.

== Head of the River crews ==
1st & 3rd Trinity Boat Club

1st & 3rd Trinity men rowed over each day to retain the headship for a fourth consecutive year.

1st & 3rd Trinity Boat Club

1st & 3rd Trinity women bumped Emmanuel on the first day to retake the headship they had held since 2007.

== Highest 2nd VIIIs ==
1st & 3rd Trinity II finished as the highest placed men's second VIII, although they fell three places in the second division.

Lady Margaret II finished as the highest placed women's second VIII, bumping up two places over the four days.

== Links to races in other years ==
Preceding year	Current year	Following year
Lent Bumps 2009	Lent Bumps 2010	Lent Bumps 2011
May Bumps 2009	May Bumps 2010	May Bumps 2011

== Bumps Charts ==
Below are the bumps charts all 4 men's and all 3 women's divisions, with the men's event on the left and women's event on the right. The bumps chart represents the progress of every crew over all four days of the racing. To follow the progress of any particular crew, simply find the crew's name on the left side of the chart and follow the line to the end-of-the-week finishing position on the right of the chart.

Note that this chart may not be displayed correctly if you are using a large font size on your browser. A simple way to check is to see that the first horizontal bold line, marking the boundary between divisions, lies between positions 17 and 18. The combined Hughes Hall/Lucy Cavendish women's crews are listed as Lucy Cavendish only.

Pos	Crew	Men's Bumps Chart	Crew	Pos	Crew	Women's Bumps Chart	Crew	Pos
1	1st & 3rd Trinity		1st & 3rd Trinity	1	Emmanuel		1st & 3rd Trinity	1
2	Downing		Downing	2	1st & 3rd Trinity		Downing	2
3	Lady Margaret		Lady Margaret	3	Jesus		Christ's	3
4	Clare		Pembroke	4	Downing		Emmanuel	4
5	Pembroke		Caius	5	Caius		Pembroke	5
6	Jesus		Jesus	6	Queens'		Jesus	6
7	Trinity Hall		Queens'	7	Christ's		Caius	7
8	Caius		Clare	8	Pembroke		Clare	8
9	Emmanuel		Trinity Hall	9	Lady Margaret		Queens'	9
10	Fitzwilliam		King's	10	Clare		St. Catharine's	10
11	Magdalene		Emmanuel	11	St. Catharine's		Trinity Hall	11
12	King's		Peterhouse	12	King's		Lady Margaret	12
13	Queens'		Magdalene	13	Churchill		Newnham	13
14	Christ's		Girton	14	Trinity Hall		King's	14
15	Churchill		Fitzwilliam	15	Selwyn		Churchill	15
16	Girton		Robinson	16	Newnham		Magdalene	16
17	Peterhouse		Churchill	17	Peterhouse		Peterhouse	17
18	1st & 3rd Trinity II		Selwyn	18	Girton		Selwyn	18
19	Selwyn		Christ's	19	Jesus II		Girton	19
20	Robinson		St. Catharine's	20	Magdalene		Lady Margaret II	20
21	Lady Margaret II		1st & 3rd Trinity II	21	Fitzwilliam		Emmanuel II	21
22	Caius II		Sidney Sussex	22	Lady Margaret II		Sidney Sussex	22
23	St. Catharine's		Lady Margaret II	23	Emmanuel II		Jesus II	23
24	Jesus II		Caius II	24	Sidney Sussex		Murray Edwards	24
25	Wolfson		Downing II	25	Robinson		Fitzwilliam	25
26	Sidney Sussex		Jesus II	26	Pembroke II		Robinson	26
27	Homerton		Wolfson	27	Anglia Ruskin		Homerton	27
28	Corpus Christi		Corpus Christi	28	Murray Edwards		Corpus Christi	28
29	Darwin		Homerton	29	Caius II		Pembroke II	29
30	Pembroke II		Queens' II	30	Homerton		Anglia Ruskin	30
31	Downing II		Pembroke II	31	Lucy Cavendish		Lucy Cavendish	31
32	Queens' II		Christ's II	32	Corpus Christi		1st & 3rd Trinity II	32
33	1st & 3rd Trinity III		Darwin	33	Darwin		Caius II	33
34	Emmanuel II		Emmanuel II	34	1st & 3rd Trinity II		Clare II	34
35	Christ's II		St Edmund's	35	Clare II		St Edmund's	35
36	Selwyn II		Anglia Ruskin	36	St Edmund's		Darwin	36
37	Churchill II		1st & 3rd Trinity III	37	Wolfson		Queens' II	37
38	St Edmund's		Selwyn II	38	Queens' II		Wolfson	38
39	Anglia Ruskin		Robinson II	39	Selwyn II		Christ's II	39
40	Jesus III		Churchill II	40	Sidney Sussex II		Newnham II	40
41	Robinson II		Magdalene II	41	Christ's II		Sidney Sussex II	41
42	Lady Margaret III		Peterhouse II	42	Clare Hall		Downing II	42
43	Trinity Hall II		Jesus III	43	Newnham II		Selwyn II	43
44	Magdalene II		Clare II	44	Emmanuel III		Clare Hall	44
45	Girton II		Lady Margaret III	45	St. Catharine's II		Magdalene II	45
46	Peterhouse II		Fitzwilliam II	46	Magdalene II		St. Catharine's II	46
47	Clare II		Trinity Hall II	47	Downing II		Emmanuel III	47
48	1st & 3rd Trinity IV		King's II	48	Churchill II		Robinson II	48
49	Fitzwilliam II		Girton II	49	Robinson II		Newnham III	49
50	Caius III		St. Catharine's II	50	Christ's III		Churchill II	50
51	King's II		Caius III	51	Peterhouse II		Peterhouse II	51
52	Wolfson II		1st & 3rd Trinity IV	52	Newnham III		Christ's III	52
53	St. Catharine's II		Hughes Hall	53				
54	Queens' III		Wolfson II	54				
55	Hughes Hall		Sidney Sussex II	55				
56	Clare Hall		Queens' III	56				
57	Anglia Ruskin II		Emmanuel III	57				
58	Sidney Sussex II		Clare Hall	58				
59	Homerton II		Christ's III	59				
60	Downing III		Anglia Ruskin II	60				
61	Lady Margaret IV		Homerton II	61				
62	Christ's III		Lady Margaret IV	62				
63	Emmanuel III		St Edmund's II	63				
64	Christ's IV		Downing III	64				
65	Robinson III		Pembroke III	65				
66	St Edmund's II		Robinson III	66				
67	Pembroke III		Christ's IV	67				
68	Emmanuel IV		King's III	68				
69	King's III		Emmanuel IV	69				
