= Lent Bumps 2000 =

The Lent Bumps 2000 were a series of rowing races held at Cambridge University from Tuesday 29 February 2000 until Saturday 4 March 2000. The event was run as a bumps race and is one of a series of Lent Bumps which have been held annually in late-February or early March since 1887. See Lent Bumps for the format of the races. In 2000, a total of 121 crews took part (69 men's crews and 52 women's crews), with around 1000 participants in total. Several thousand spectators came to watch, particularly on the Saturday.

== Head of the River crews ==
1st & 3rd Trinity men bumped Lady Margaret and Caius to take back the headship they lost in 1999.

Emmanuel women bumped Trinity Hall to take back the headship they lost in 1999 and collect their 9th headship since 1988.

== Highest 2nd VIIIs ==
The highest men's 2nd VIII at the end of the week was Caius II, who bumped Lady Margaret II on the 1st day on their way to finishing up 5 places.

The highest women's 2nd VIII was Lady Margaret II, who bumped Jesus II on the 2nd day.

== Links to races in other years ==
Preceding year	Current year	Following year
Lent Bumps 1999	Lent Bumps 2000	Lent Bumps 2001
May Bumps 1999	May Bumps 2000	May Bumps 2001

== Bumps Charts ==
Below are the complete bumps charts for the races, with the men's event on the left and women's event on the right. The bumps chart represents the progress of every crew over all four days of the racing. To follow the progress of any particular crew, simply find the crew's name on the left side of the chart and follow the line to the end-of-the-week finishing position on the right of the chart.

Pos	Crew	Men's Bumps Chart	Crew	Pos	Crew	Women's Bumps Chart	Crew	Pos
1	Caius		1st & 3rd Trinity	1	Trinity Hall		Emmanuel	1
2	Lady Margaret		Caius	2	Emmanuel		Jesus	2
3	1st & 3rd Trinity		Emmanuel	3	Pembroke		Newnham	3
4	Jesus		Lady Margaret	4	Jesus		Trinity Hall	4
5	Christ's		Christ's	5	Queens'		Pembroke	5
6	Downing		Trinity Hall	6	Newnham		Queens'	6
7	Emmanuel		Jesus	7	Christ's		Caius	7
8	Churchill		Downing	8	Lady Margaret		Lady Margaret	8
9	Trinity Hall		Churchill	9	Churchill		Downing	9
10	Fitzwilliam		Robinson	10	1st & 3rd Trinity		Christ's	10
11	Robinson		Clare	11	Caius		New Hall	11
12	Magdalene		Selwyn	12	St. Catharine's		Churchill	12
13	Clare		Churchill	13	Downing		Clare	13
14	Pembroke		Fitzwilliam	14	New Hall		1st & 3rd Trinity	14
15	Selwyn		Girton	15	Fitzwilliam		St. Catharine's	15
16	Queens'		Magdalene	16	Clare		Girton	16
17	St. Catharine's		Caius II	17	CCAT		Selwyn	17
18	Peterhouse		Pembroke	18	Selwyn		CCAT	18
19	Girton		Queens'	19	Sidney Sussex		Fitzwilliam	19
20	King's		Peterhouse	20	Girton		Sidney Sussex	20
21	Lady Margaret II		Sidney Sussex	21	Magdalene		Lady Margaret II	21
22	Caius II		Downing II	22	Jesus II		Jesus II	22
23	Sidney Sussex		King's	23	King's		Magdalene	23
24	1st & 3rd Trinity II		Lady Margaret II	24	Lady Margaret II		Robinson	24
25	Downing II		Christ's II	25	Robinson		Wolfson	25
26	Christ's II		Jesus II	26	Corpus Christi		King's	26
27	Trinity Hall II		1st & 3rd Trinity II	27	Emmanuel II		Darwin	27
28	Lady Margaret III		Corpus Christi	28	Newnham II		Emmanuel II	28
29	Corpus Christi		Churchill II	29	Wolfson		Homerton	29
30	Jesus II		Trinity Hall II	30	Homerton		Corpus Christi	30
31	Churchill II		Lady Margaret III	31	Darwin		New Hall II	31
32	Queens' II		Emmanuel II	32	Peterhouse		Newnham II	32
33	CCAT		Pembroke II	33	Queens' II		Peterhouse	33
34	Pembroke II		CCAT	34	Hughes Hall		Trinity Hall II	34
35	Emmanuel II		Queens' II	35	St. Catharine's II		Queens' II	35
36	St. Catharine's II		Wolfson	36	New Hall II		Hughes Hall	36
37	Wolfson		Selwyn II	37	Trinity Hall II		Churchill II	37
38	Clare II		Robinson II	38	CCAT II		St. Catharine's II	38
39	Selwyn II		St. Catharine's II	39	Clare Hall		Clare II	39
40	Fitzwilliam II		Clare II	40	Churchill II		CCAT II	40
41	Robinson II		Fitzwilliam II	41	Homerton II		Pembroke II	41
42	Peterhouse II		Jesus III	42	Lucy Cavendish		Caius II	42
43	1st & 3rd Trinity III		Girton II	43	Pembroke II		Clare Hall	43
44	Girton II		Darwin	44	Clare II		Lady Margaret III	44
45	Jesus III		Peterhouse II	45	Selwyn II		Downing II	45
46	Darwin		Downing III	46	Lady Margaret III		Selwyn II	46
47	Downing III		1st & 3rd Trinity III	47	Downing II		Homerton II	47
48	Corpus Christi II		Corpus Christi II	48	Caius II		Robinson II	48
49	Hughes Hall		Sidney Sussex II	49	Girton II		Girton II	49
50	Homerton		Homerton	50	King's II		Lucy Cavendish	50
51	Queens' III		King's II	51	Sidney Sussex II		Sidney Sussex II	51
52	King's II		Hughes Hall	52	Robinson II		King's II	52
53	Sidney Sussex II		Caius III	53				
54	Lady Margaret IV		Queens' III	54				
55	Clare Hall		1st & 3rd Trinity IV	55				
56	Caius III		Christ's III	56				
57	1st & 3rd Trinity IV		Lady Margaret IV	57				
58	Christ's III		Trinity Hall III	58				
59	St. Catharine's III		Clare Hall	59				
60	Clare III		St. Catharine's III	60				
61	Trinity Hall III		Robinson III	61				
62	Churchill III		Wolfson II	62				
63	St Edmund's		Clare III	63				
64	Robinson III		Emmanuel III	64				
65	Selwyn III		Churchill III	65				
66	Wolfson II		Selwyn III	66				
67	Emmanuel III		St Edmund's	67				
68	Trinity Hall IV		Downing IV	68				
69	Downing IV		Trinity Hall IV	69				
