= Lent Bumps 1999 =

The Lent Bumps 1999 were a series of rowing races held at Cambridge University from Tuesday 23 February 1999 until Saturday 27 February 1999. The event was run as a bumps race and is one of a series of Lent Bumps which have been held annually in late-February or early March since 1887. In 1999, a total of 121 crews took part (69 men's crews and 52 women's crews), with around 1000 participants in total. Several thousand spectators came to watch, particularly on the Saturday.

== Head of the River crews ==
Caius men bumped Downing, Lady Margaret and First and Third Trinity to take their first ever headship of the Lent Bumps.

Trinity Hall women bumped Emmanuel to regain the headship they had lost in 1996.

== Highest 2nd VIIIs ==
The highest men's 2nd VIII for the 3rd consecutive year was Lady Margaret II.

The highest women's 2nd VIII was Jesus II, who bumped Lady Margaret II on the 3rd day.

== Links to races in other years ==
Preceding year	Current year	Following year
Lent Bumps 1998	Lent Bumps 1999	Lent Bumps 2000
May Bumps 1998	May Bumps 1999	May Bumps 2000

== Bumps Charts ==
Below are the bumps charts for the 1st and 2nd divisions, with the men's event on the left and women's event on the right. The bumps chart represents the progress of every crew over all four days of the racing. To follow the progress of any particular crew, simply find the crew's name on the left side of the chart and follow the line to the end-of-the-week finishing position on the right of the chart.

Pos	Crew	Men's Bumps Chart	Crew	Pos	Crew	Women's Bumps Chart	Crew	Pos
1	1st & 3rd Trinity		Caius	1	Emmanuel		Trinity Hall	1
2	Lady Margaret		Lady Margaret	2	Trinity Hall		Emmanuel	2
3	Downing		1st & 3rd Trinity	3	Queens'		Pembroke	3
4	Caius		Jesus	4	Pembroke		Jesus	4
5	Churchill		Christ's	5	Jesus		Queens'	5
6	Jesus		Downing	6	Christ's		Newnham	6
7	Trinity Hall		Emmanuel	7	Lady Margaret		Christ's	7
8	Christ's		Churchill	8	Newnham		Lady Margaret	8
9	Fitzwilliam		Trinity Hall	9	St. Catharine's		Churchill	9
10	Pembroke		Fitzwilliam	10	1st & 3rd Trinity		1st & 3rd Trinity	10
11	Emmanuel		Robinson	11	Churchill		Caius	11
12	Magdalene		Magdalene	12	Clare		St. Catharine's	12
13	Queens'		Clare	13	New Hall		Downing	13
14	Robinson		Pembroke	14	CCAT		New Hall	14
15	Lady Margaret II		Selwyn	15	Caius		Fitzwilliam	15
16	Girton		Queens'	16	Downing		Clare	16
17	Clare		St. Catharine's	17	Fitzwilliam		CCAT	17
18	Selwyn		Peterhouse	18	Selwyn		Selwyn	18
19	Sidney Sussex		Girton	19	Girton		Sidney Sussex	19
20	Peterhouse		King's	20	Lady Margaret II		Girton	20
21	1st & 3rd Trinity II		Lady Margaret II	21	Sidney Sussex		Magdalene	21
22	St. Catharine's		Caius II	22	Magdalene		Jesus II	22
23	King's		Sidney Sussex	23	Jesus II		King's	23
24	Downing II		1st & 3rd Trinity II	24	Corpus Christi		Lady Margaret II	24
25	Caius II		Downing II	25	Emmanuel II		Robinson	25
26	Corpus Christi		Christ's II	26	King's		Corpus Christi	26
27	Christ's II		Trinity Hall II	27	Newnham II		Emmanuel II	27
28	Trinity Hall II		Lady Margaret III	28	Homerton		Newnham II	28
29	Queens' II		Corpus Christi	29	Robinson		Wolfson	29
30	Lady Margaret III		Jesus II	30	Peterhouse		Homerton	30
31	Pembroke II		Churchill II	31	St. Catharine's II		Darwin	31
32	Churchill II		Queens' II	32	Wolfson		Peterhouse	32
33	Jesus II		CCAT	33	New Hall II		Queens' II	33
34	St. Catharine's II		Pembroke II	34	Clare Hall		St. Catharine's II	34
35	Clare II		Emmanuel II	35	Darwin		New Hall II	35
36	Fitzwilliam II		St. Catharine's II	36	Trinity Hall II		Trinity Hall II	36
37	CCAT		Wolfson	37	Queens' II		CCAT II	37
38	Peterhouse II		Clare II	38	CCAT II		Clare Hall	38
39	Emmanuel II		Selwyn II	39	Lucy Cavendish		Churchill II	39
40	Magdalene II		Fitzwilliam II	40	Homerton II		Homerton II	40
41	Wolfson		Robinson II	41	1st & 3rd Trinity II		Vet School	41
42	Selwyn II		Peterhouse II	42	Selwyn II		Lucy Cavendish	42
43	1st & 3rd Trinity III		Magdalene II	43	Churchill II		Pembroke II	43
44	Downing III		1st & 3rd Trinity III	44	Vet School		1st & 3rd Trinity II	44
45	Robinson II		Girton II	45	Downing II		Clare II	45
46	Hughes Hall		Jesus III	46	Caius II		Selwyn II	46
47	Girton II		Darwin	47	Pembroke II		Lady Margaret III	47
48	Corpus Christi II		Downing III	48	Clare II		Downing II	48
49	Jesus III		Corpus Christi II	49	Darwin II		Darwin II	49
50	Darwin		Hughes Hall	50	Lady Margaret III		Caius II	50
51	Homerton		Homerton	51	Girton II		Girton II	51
52	Clare Hall		Queens' III	52	Newnham III		Newnham III	52
53	Sidney Sussex II		King's II	53				
54	Queens' III		Sidney Sussex II	54				
55	King's II		Lady Margaret IV	55				
56	Christ's III		Clare Hall	56				
57	Clare III		Caius III	57				
58	Lady Margaret IV		1st & 3rd Trinity IV	58				
59	Trinity Hall III		Christ's III	59				
60	Caius III		St. Catharine's III	60				
61	Churchill III		Clare III	61				
62	1st & 3rd Trinity IV		CCAT II	62				
63	St. Edmund's		Trinity Hall III	63				
64	St. Catharine's III		Churchill III	64				
65	CCAT II		Caius IV	65				
66	Lady Margaret V		St. Edmund's	66				
67	Caius IV		Lady Margaret V	67				
68	Robinson III		Robinson III	68				
69	Jesus IV		Jesus IV	69				
