= Lent Bumps 2006 =

The Lent Bumps 2006 was a series of rowing races held at Cambridge University from Tuesday 28 February 2006 until Saturday 4 March 2006. The event was run as a bumps race and has been held annually in late-February or early March in this format since 1887. See Lent Bumps for the format of the races. This year, a total of 121 crews took part (69 men's crews and 52 women's crews), with nearly 1100 participants in total.

== Head of the River crews ==
Caius men gained their 5th consecutive headship and 6th since 1999. Their 19-day hold on the Lent headship is, so far, the 5th longest continuous defence in history (Lady Margaret have the longest spell of 26 consecutive days at the top between 1975 and 1981).

Clare women bumped Downing to take their first ever Lent Headship (they started Head of the Lents, but lost it that year, in the very first women's Lent Bumps in 1976).

== Highest 2nd VIIIs ==
The highest men's 2nd VIII at the end of the week was Lady Margaret II, who took it from Caius II on the 2nd day.

The highest women's 2nd VIII for the 6th consecutive year was Jesus II.

== Links to races in other years ==
Preceding year	Current year	Following year
Lent Bumps 2005	Lent Bumps 2006	Lent Bumps 2007
May Bumps 2005	May Bumps 2006	May Bumps 2007

== Bumps Charts ==
Below are the bumps charts all four men's and all three women's divisions, with the men's event on the left and women's event on the right. The bumps chart represents the progress of every crew over all four days of the racing. To follow the progress of any particular crew, simply find the crew's name on the left side of the chart and follow the line to the end-of-the-week finishing position on the right of the chart.

Note that this chart may not be displayed correctly if you are using a large font size on your browser.

Pos	Crew	Men's Bumps Chart	Crew	Pos	Crew	Women's Bumps Chart	Crew	Pos
1	Caius		Caius	1	Downing		Clare	1
2	1st & 3rd Trinity		1st & 3rd Trinity	2	Clare		Caius	2
3	Downing		Downing	3	Caius		Emmanuel	3
4	Lady Margaret		Jesus	4	Emmanuel		1st & 3rd Trinity	4
5	Jesus		Lady Margaret	5	Jesus		Downing	5
6	Emmanuel		Churchill	6	Lady Margaret		Jesus	6
7	Churchill		Emmanuel	7	1st & 3rd Trinity		Newnham	7
8	Trinity Hall		Queens'	8	Newnham		Lady Margaret	8
9	Selwyn		Trinity Hall	9	Pembroke		Trinity Hall	9
10	Queens'		Clare	10	Girton		Girton	10
11	Clare		Pembroke	11	Trinity Hall		Churchill	11
12	St. Catharine's		Selwyn	12	Churchill		Selwyn	12
13	Robinson		Christ's	13	Christ's		Pembroke	13
14	Pembroke		King's	14	Selwyn		Queens'	14
15	Christ's		Fitzwilliam	15	Queens'		New Hall	15
16	Magdalene		Robinson	16	St. Catharine's		Fitzwilliam	16
17	King's		Lady Margaret II	17	New Hall		Christ's	17
18	Caius II		St. Catharine's	18	Fitzwilliam		Robinson	18
19	Fitzwilliam		Magdalene	19	Robinson		King's	19
20	Girton		Caius II	20	Jesus II		St. Catharine's	20
21	Lady Margaret II		Girton	21	Sidney Sussex		Jesus II	21
22	Peterhouse		Wolfson	22	King's		Peterhouse	22
23	Sidney Sussex		Sidney Sussex	23	Magdalene		Sidney Sussex	23
24	Downing II		Peterhouse	24	Peterhouse		Lady Margaret II	24
25	CCAT		1st & 3rd Trinity II	25	Darwin		Darwin	25
26	Wolfson		Darwin	26	Lady Margaret II		Magdalene	26
27	1st & 3rd Trinity II		Downing II	27	Emmanuel II		CCAT	27
28	Queens' II		Jesus II	28	CCAT		Wolfson	28
29	Darwin		CCAT	29	St. Edmund's		Caius II	29
30	Jesus II		Corpus Christi	30	Newnham II		Emmanuel II	30
31	Trinity Hall II		Queens' II	31	Wolfson		Newnham II	31
32	Churchill II		Emmanuel II	32	Caius II		St. Edmund's	32
33	Pembroke II		Churchill II	33	St. Catharine's II		Pembroke II	33
34	Corpus Christi		Pembroke II	34	Queens' II		Corpus Christi	34
35	Emmanuel II		Trinity Hall II	35	New Hall II		Queens' II	35
36	Robinson II		Robinson II	36	Pembroke II		Homerton	36
37	Homerton		Selwyn II	37	Homerton		St. Catharine's II	37
38	Lady Margaret III		Homerton	38	Corpus Christi		New Hall II	38
39	Selwyn II		Christ's II	39	Clare Hall		Lucy Cavendish	39
40	Christ's II		1st & 3rd Trinity III	40	Lucy Cavendish		Girton II	40
41	Clare II		Lady Margaret III	41	Downing II		Clare II	41
42	1st & 3rd Trinity III		Jesus III	42	Girton II		Clare Hall	42
43	St. Catharine's II		Caius III	43	Trinity Hall II		1st & 3rd Trinity II	43
44	Caius III		Clare II	44	Clare II		Downing II	44
45	Jesus III		Fitzwilliam II	45	1st & 3rd Trinity II		Newnham III	45
46	Fitzwilliam II		1st & 3rd Trinity IV	46	Newnham III		Trinity Hall II	46
47	Peterhouse II		St. Catharine's II	47	CCAT II		CCAT II	47
48	Queens' III		St. Edmund's	48	Fitzwilliam II		Peterhouse II	48
49	Downing III		Peterhouse II	49	Peterhouse II		Wolfson II	49
50	1st & 3rd Trinity IV		Girton II	50	King's II		Fitzwilliam II	50
51	Girton II		Queens' III	51	CCAT III		King's II	51
52	St. Edmund's		Magdalene II	52	Wolfson II		CCAT III	52
53	Magdalene II		Downing III	53				
54	Sidney Sussex II		Sidney Sussex II	54				
55	Hughes Hall		Clare Hall	55				
56	Clare Hall		Lady Margaret IV	56				
57	King's II		Hughes Hall	57				
58	Wolfson II		King's II	58				
59	Lady Margaret IV		Selwyn III	59				
60	Pembroke III		Wolfson II	60				
61	Corpus Christi II		Corpus Christi II	61				
62	Christ's III		Emmanuel III	62				
63	Selwyn III		Christ's III	63				
64	Emmanuel III		Pembroke III	64				
65	CCAT II		CCAT II	65				
66	Jesus IV		St. Edmund's II	66				
67	Fitzwilliam III		Fitzwilliam III	67				
68	1st & 3rd Trinity V		Jesus IV	68				
69	St. Edmund's II		1st & 3rd Trinity V	69				

== The Getting-on Race ==
The Getting-on Race (GoR) allows a number of crews which did not already have a place from last year's races to compete for the right to race this year. Up to ten crews are removed from the bottom of last year's finishing order, who must then race alongside new entrants to decide which crews gain a place (with one bumps place per 3 crews competing, subject to the maximum of 10 available places).

The 2006 Lent Bumps Getting-on Race took place on 24 February 2006.

=== Successful crews ===
The successful crews which qualified to compete in the bumps were (displayed in their order of racing in the draw);

==== Women ====
- Trinity Hall II
- Clare II
- 1st & 3rd Trinity II
- Newnham III
- CCAT II
- Peterhouse II
- King's II
- CCAT III
- Fitzwilliam II
- Wolfson II

==== Men ====
- Pembroke III
- Corpus Christi II
- Christ's III
- Selwyn III
- Emmanuel III
- CCAT II
- Jesus IV
- Fitzwilliam III
- 1st & 3rd Trinity V
- St. Edmund's II
