= Lent Bumps 2008 =

Series of rowing races in Cambridge, England

The Lent Bumps 2008 were a series of rowing races at the University of Cambridge held on the River Cam from Tuesday 26 February 2008 until Saturday 1 March 2008. The event was run as a bumps race and was the 121st race in the series of Lent Bumps, which have been held annually in late February or early March on the 7th week of Lent Term in this form since 1887. See Lent Bumps for the format of the races. A total of 121 crews took part (69 men's crews and 52 women's crews), comprising nearly 1100 participants in total.

== Head of the River crews ==
1st & 3rd Trinity Boat Club

1st & 3rd Trinity men rowed over each day to retain the Lents headship won from Caius in 2006. It is the first time they have held it for two consecutive years.

1st & 3rd Trinity Boat Club

1st & 3rd Trinity women also rowed over every day to retain the headship, their second ever.

1st & 3rd Trinity continued to hold a double headship, the only club other than Caius ever to achieve this, and are the first club to defend a double headship successfully.

== Highest 2nd VIIIs ==
1st & 3rd Trinity II bumped Lady Margaret II on the Friday to become the highest men's 2nd VIII.

Jesus II women made history for the second set of bumps in a row, bumping up into the first division to remain the highest placed women's 2nd crew for the 8th year and into a position that has never been achieved before.

== Links to races in other years ==
Preceding year	Current year	Following year
Lent Bumps 2007	Lent Bumps 2008	Lent Bumps 2009
May Bumps 2007	May Bumps 2008	May Bumps 2009

== Bumps Charts ==
Below are the bumps charts all 4 men's and all 3 women's divisions, with the men's event on the left and women's event on the right. The bumps chart represents the progress of every crew over all four days of the racing. To follow the progress of any particular crew, simply find the crew's name on the left side of the chart and follow the line to the end-of-the-week finishing position on the right of the chart.

Note that this chart may not be displayed correctly if you are using a large font size on your browser. A simple way to check is to see that the first horizontal bold line, marking the boundary between divisions, lies between positions 17 and 18. The combined Hughes Hall/Lucy Cavendish women's crews are listed as Lucy Cavendish only.

Pos	Crew	Men's Bumps Chart	Crew	Pos	Crew	Women's Bumps Chart	Crew	Pos
1	1st & 3rd Trinity		1st & 3rd Trinity	1	1st & 3rd Trinity		1st & 3rd Trinity	1
2	Jesus		Lady Margaret	2	Jesus		Emmanuel	2
3	Caius		Downing	3	Clare		Jesus	3
4	Lady Margaret		Jesus	4	Emmanuel		Caius	4
5	Downing		Clare	5	Caius		Downing	5
6	Emmanuel		Pembroke	6	Downing		Clare	6
7	Trinity Hall		Caius	7	Lady Margaret		Pembroke	7
8	Clare		Emmanuel	8	Newnham		Lady Margaret	8
9	Churchill		King's	9	Churchill		Queens'	9
10	Pembroke		Fitzwilliam	10	Girton		Churchill	10
11	King's		Trinity Hall	11	Pembroke		Christ's	11
12	Queens'		Christ's	12	Queens'		Newnham	12
13	Fitzwilliam		Churchill	13	Trinity Hall		St. Catharine's	13
14	Christ's		Magdalene	14	Fitzwilliam		Girton	14
15	Selwyn		Queens'	15	Christ's		King's	15
16	Magdalene		1st & 3rd Trinity II	16	Selwyn		Trinity Hall	16
17	Robinson		Selwyn	17	St. Catharine's		Jesus II	17
18	Lady Margaret II		Lady Margaret II	18	Peterhouse		Fitzwilliam	18
19	Caius II		Robinson	19	New Hall		Selwyn	19
20	Wolfson		Girton	20	Robinson		Lady Margaret II	20
21	1st & 3rd Trinity II		Peterhouse	21	Jesus II		Peterhouse	21
22	St. Catharine's		Caius II	22	King's		Emmanuel II	22
23	Girton		Jesus II	23	CCAT		Robinson	23
24	Peterhouse		Wolfson	24	Lady Margaret II		Magdalene	24
25	Jesus II		Corpus Christi	25	Sidney Sussex		New Hall	25
26	Sidney Sussex		St. Catharine's	26	Emmanuel II		Pembroke II	26
27	Corpus Christi		Sidney Sussex	27	Darwin		CCAT	27
28	Emmanuel II		Downing II	28	Magdalene		Sidney Sussex	28
29	Darwin		Pembroke II	29	Pembroke II		Caius II	29
30	Churchill II		Emmanuel II	30	Wolfson		Darwin	30
31	Downing II		Homerton	31	St Edmund's		Homerton	31
32	Pembroke II		Darwin	32	Caius II		St Edmund's	32
33	CCAT		1st & 3rd Trinity III	33	Homerton		Lucy Cavendish	33
34	Homerton		Churchill II	34	Newnham II		Wolfson	34
35	Queens' II		Queens' II	35	Corpus Christi		Corpus Christi	35
36	Selwyn II		CCAT	36	Lucy Cavendish		1st & 3rd Trinity II	36
37	1st & 3rd Trinity III		Selwyn II	37	Clare II		Newnham II	37
38	Trinity Hall II		Christ's II	38	Queens' II		Clare II	38
39	Jesus III		Jesus III	39	1st & 3rd Trinity II		Selwyn II	39
40	Robinson II		Girton II	40	Girton II		Girton II	40
41	Fitzwilliam II		Trinity Hall II	41	New Hall II		Clare Hall	41
42	Christ's II		St Edmund's	42	Selwyn II		Queens' II	42
43	Lady Margaret III		Robinson II	43	Clare Hall		Pembroke III	43
44	Girton II		Lady Margaret III	44	Trinity Hall II		Christ's II	44
45	Caius III		Fitzwilliam II	45	Pembroke III		New Hall II	45
46	St Edmund's		Clare II	46	Christ's II		Sidney Sussex II	46
47	Clare II		1st & 3rd Trinity IV	47	Downing II		Trinity Hall II	47
48	Peterhouse II		Magdalene II	48	Emmanuel III		Emmanuel III	48
49	1st & 3rd Trinity IV		Caius III	49	Lucy Cavendish II		Downing II	49
50	Magdalene II		Peterhouse II	50	Sidney Sussex II		Lucy Cavendish II	50
51	St. Catharine's II		St. Catharine's II	51	Selwyn III		Jesus III	51
52	Downing III		Queens' III	52	Jesus III		Selwyn III	52
53	Queens' III		Clare Hall	53				
54	Clare Hall		Wolfson III	54				
55	Wolfson II		King's II	55				
56	King's II		Downing III	56				
57	Hughes Hall		Hughes Hall	57				
58	Sidney Sussex II		Sidney Sussex II	58				
59	Emmanuel III		Selwyn III	59				
60	Lady Margaret IV		CCAT II	60				
61	Selwyn III		Emmanuel III	61				
62	Churchill III		Homerton II	62				
63	Christ's III		Lady Margaret IV	63				
64	CCAT II		Churchill III	64				
65	Homerton II		Pembroke III	65				
66	Pembroke III		Christ's III	66				
67	Magdalene III		Corpus Christi II	67				
68	Corpus Christi II		Magdalene III	68				
69	Hughes Hall II		Hughes Hall II	69				
