= Lent Bumps 2004 =

The Lent Bumps 2004 were a series of rowing races held at Cambridge University from Tuesday, 24 February 2004 until Saturday 28 February 2004. The event was run as a bumps race and is one of the series of Lent Bumps which have been held annually in late-February or early March since 1887. See Lent Bumps for the format of the races. In 2004, a total of 121 crews took part (69 men's crews and 52 women's crews), with nearly 1100 participants in total.

== Head of the River crews ==
Caius men rowed-over in 1st position retaining the headship, their 3rd successively.

Downing women bumped Emmanuel and Caius to take their first ever women's bumps headship.

== Highest 2nd VIIIs ==
The highest men's 2nd VIII for the 5th consecutive year was Caius II.

The highest women's 2nd VIII for the 4th consecutive year was Jesus II.

== Links to races in other years ==
Preceding year	Current year	Following year
Lent Bumps 2003	Lent Bumps 2004	Lent Bumps 2005
May Bumps 2003	May Bumps 2004	May Bumps 2005

== Bumps Charts ==
Below are the bumps charts all 4 men's and all 3 women's divisions, with the men's event on the left and women's event on the right. The bumps chart represents the progress of every crew over all four days of the racing. To follow the progress of any particular crew, simply find the crew's name on the left side of the chart and follow the line to the end-of-the-week finishing position on the right of the chart.

Note that this chart may not be displayed correctly if you are using a large font size on your browser.

Pos	Crew	Men's Bumps Chart	Crew	Pos	Crew	Women's Bumps Chart	Crew	Pos
1	Caius		Caius	1	Caius		Downing	1
2	1st & 3rd Trinity		1st & 3rd Trinity	2	Emmanuel		Emmanuel	2
3	Downing		Downing	3	Downing		Caius	3
4	Lady Margaret		Trinity Hall	4	Jesus		Jesus	4
5	Jesus		Emmanuel	5	Lady Margaret		Clare	5
6	Trinity Hall		Lady Margaret	6	Clare		Lady Margaret	6
7	Emmanuel		Jesus	7	Newnham		Trinity Hall	7
8	Churchill		Churchill	8	Churchill		Newnham	8
9	Christ's		St. Catharine's	9	Trinity Hall		Girton	9
10	St. Catharine's		Robinson	10	Queens'		Churchill	10
11	Selwyn		Selwyn	11	Christ's		Pembroke	11
12	Robinson		Queens'	12	Girton		Christ's	12
13	Clare		Christ's	13	Pembroke		1st & 3rd Trinity	13
14	Caius II		Clare	14	1st & 3rd Trinity		Queens'	14
15	Queens'		Pembroke	15	New Hall		Selwyn	15
16	Pembroke		Magdalene	16	Sidney Sussex		New Hall	16
17	Fitzwilliam		Caius II	17	Selwyn		St. Catharine's	17
18	Girton		Fitzwilliam	18	St. Catharine's		Jesus II	18
19	Lady Margaret II		King's	19	Magdalene		Robinson	19
20	Sidney Sussex		Girton	20	Jesus II		Sidney Sussex	20
21	Magdalene		Peterhouse	21	Robinson		Magdalene	21
22	Peterhouse		Lady Margaret II	22	CCAT		Fitzwilliam	22
23	King's		CCAT	23	Darwin		Emmanuel II	23
24	Downing II		Sidney Sussex	24	Fitzwilliam		Darwin	24
25	1st & 3rd Trinity II		Downing II	25	Peterhouse		King's	25
26	CCAT		1st & 3rd Trinity II	26	Lady Margaret II		CCAT	26
27	Jesus II		Queens' II	27	Emmanuel II		Peterhouse	27
28	Corpus Christi		Wolfson	28	King's		Newnham II	28
29	Emmanuel II		Jesus II	29	New Hall II		Wolfson	29
30	Queens' II		Corpus Christi	30	Newnham II		Lady Margaret II	30
31	Christ's II		Churchill II	31	Wolfson		St. Edmund's	31
32	Wolfson		Emmanuel II	32	Homerton		New Hall II	32
33	Churchill II		Darwin	33	Queens' II		Homerton	33
34	Robinson II		Lady Margaret III	34	Corpus Christi		St. Catharine's II	34
35	Trinity Hall II		Christ's II	35	Clare Hall		Queens' II	35
36	Darwin		Robinson II	36	St. Edmund's		Corpus Christi	36
37	Lady Margaret III		Pembroke II	37	Pembroke II		Caius II	37
38	Clare II		Trinity Hall II	38	Lucy Cavendish		Clare Hall	38
39	St. Catharine's II		St. Catharine's II	39	Caius II		Pembroke II	39
40	Pembroke II		Homerton	40	St. Catharine's II		Girton II	40
41	1st & 3rd Trinity III		Clare II	41	Clare II		Lucy Cavendish	41
42	Selwyn II		Selwyn II	42	Trinity Hall II		Trinity Hall II	42
43	Girton II		Jesus III	43	Girton II		Downing II	43
44	Fitzwilliam II		Downing III	44	Downing II		Clare II	44
45	Jesus III		1st & 3rd Trinity III	45	Pembroke III		Jesus III	45
46	Homerton		Peterhouse II	46	Jesus III		Emmanuel III	46
47	Downing III		Fitzwilliam II	47	New Hall III		Christ's II	47
48	Sidney Sussex II		1st & 3rd Trinity IV	48	Christ's II		1st & 3rd Trinity II	48
49	Caius III		Girton II	49	Emmanuel III		Pembroke III	49
50	Peterhouse II		Caius III	50	Fitzwilliam II		Darwin II	50
51	Clare Hall		Sidney Sussex II	51	Darwin II		New Hall III	51
52	1st & 3rd Trinity IV		Queens' III	52	1st & 3rd Trinity II		Fitzwilliam II	52
53	Corpus Christi II		Hughes Hall	53				
54	Hughes Hall		St. Edmund's	54				
55	King's II		Clare Hall	55				
56	Queens' III		Magdalene II	56				
57	Wolfson II		Corpus Christi II	57				
58	St. Edmund's		King's II	58				
59	Christ's III		Churchill III	59				
60	Magdalene II		Wolfson II	60				
61	Churchill III		Lady Margaret IV	61				
62	Lady Margaret IV		Trinity Hall III	62				
63	Clare III		Christ's III	63				
64	Pembroke III		Pembroke III	64				
65	Trinity Hall III		Darwin II	65				
66	Darwin II		Clare III	66				
67	Peterhouse III		Downing IV	67				
68	Robinson III		Robinson III	68				
69	Downing IV		Peterhouse III	69				
