= Lent Bumps 1998 =

The Lent Bumps 1998 were a series of rowing races held at Cambridge University from Tuesday 24 until Saturday 28 February 1998. The event was run as a bumps race and is one of a series of Lent Bumps which have been held annually in late-February or early March since 1887. See Lent Bumps for the format of the races. In 1998, a total of 121 crews took part (69 men's crews and 52 women's crews), with around 1000 participants in total. Several thousand spectators came to watch, particularly on the Saturday.

Due to pressures from the university authorities, the 1998 Lent Bumps was run over 5 days, rather than 4 days, which was the norm since the end of World War II. In the new format, each division had one day off racing, with the 1st divisions missing the first day, 2nd divisions missing the second day etc., which reduced the amount of time needed to complete the racing each day and thus reduce the need for many students to miss lectures. Every division raced on the last day, but as this was a Saturday with fewer lectures held in the university, this wasn't as big a problem. This format, introduced in 1998, has been used at every Lent Bumps since.

== Head of the River crews ==
First and Third Trinity men bumped Downing to take their first headship of the Lent Bumps since 1971.

Emmanuel women rowed-over in first position, achieving the headship for the second consecutive year.

== Highest 2nd VIIIs ==
The highest men's 2nd VIII for the 2nd consecutive year was Lady Margaret II.

The highest women's 2nd VIII at the end of the week was Lady Margaret II, who bumped Jesus II on the 2nd day.

== Links to races in other years ==
Preceding year	Current year	Following year
Lent Bumps 1997	Lent Bumps 1998	Lent Bumps 1999
May Bumps 1997	May Bumps 1998	May Bumps 1999

== Bumps Charts ==
Below are the bumps charts for all four men's and all 3 women's divisions, with the men's event on the left and women's event on the right. The bumps chart represents the progress of every crew over all four days of the racing. To follow the progress of any particular crew, simply find the crew's name on the left side of the chart and follow the line to the end-of-the-week finishing position on the right of the chart.

Pos	Crew	Men's Bumps Chart	Crew	Pos	Crew	Women's Bumps Chart	Crew	Pos
1	Downing		1st & 3rd Trinity	1	Emmanuel		Emmanuel	1
2	1st & 3rd Trinity		Lady Margaret	2	Trinity Hall		Trinity Hall	2
3	Trinity Hall		Downing	3	Queens'		Queens'	3
4	Lady Margaret		Caius	4	Lady Margaret		Pembroke	4
5	Caius		Churchill	5	Jesus		Jesus	5
6	Christ's		Jesus	6	St. Catharine's		Christ's	6
7	Churchill		Trinity Hall	7	New Hall		Lady Margaret	7
8	Jesus		Christ's	8	Churchill		Newnham	8
9	Queens'		Fitzwilliam	9	Christ's		St. Catharine's	9
10	Pembroke		Pembroke	10	Pembroke		1st & 3rd Trinity	10
11	Fitzwilliam		Emmanuel	11	Newnham		Churchill	11
12	Girton		Magdalene	12	Caius		Clare	12
13	Emmanuel		Queens'	13	Girton		New Hall	13
14	Selwyn		Robinson	14	Downing		CCAT	14
15	Magdalene		Lady Margaret II	15	Clare		Caius	15
16	Robinson		Girton	16	1st & 3rd Trinity		Downing	16
17	Sidney Sussex		Clare	17	Sidney Sussex		Fitzwilliam	17
18	Peterhouse		Selwyn	18	CCAT		Selwyn	18
19	St. Catharine's		Sidney Sussex	19	Selwyn		Girton	19
20	Lady Margaret II		Peterhouse	20	Jesus II		Lady Margaret II	20
21	Clare		1st & 3rd Trinity II	21	Fitzwilliam		Sidney Sussex	21
22	King's		St. Catharine's	22	Lady Margaret II		Magdalene	22
23	1st & 3rd Trinity II		King's	23	Corpus Christi		Jesus II	23
24	Downing II		Downing II	24	Homerton		Corpus Christi	24
25	Queens' II		Caius II	25	Magdalene		Emmanuel II	25
26	Caius II		Corpus Christi	26	King's		King's	26
27	Pembroke II		Christ's II	27	Robinson		Newnham II	27
28	Corpus Christi		Trinity Hall II	28	Emmanuel II		Homerton	28
29	Jesus II		Queens' II	29	Newnham II		Robinson	29
30	Christ's II		Lady Margaret III	30	Trinity Hall II		Peterhouse	30
31	Clare II		Pembroke II	31	Peterhouse		St. Catharine's II	31
32	Trinity Hall II		Churchill II	32	New Hall II		Wolfson	32
33	Lady Margaret III		Jesus II	33	Wolfson		New Hall II	33
34	Fitzwilliam II		St. Catharine's II	34	Lucy Cavendish		Darwin	34
35	Peterhouse II		Clare II	35	Queens' II		Trinity Hall II	35
36	Churchill II		Fitzwilliam II	36	St. Catharine's II		Queens' II	36
37	Magdalene II		CCAT	37	Selwyn II		CCAT II	37
38	Selwyn II		Peterhouse II	38	Darwin		Lucy Cavendish	38
39	St. Catharine's II		Emmanuel II	39	CCAT II		Homerton II	39
40	CCAT		Magdalene II	40	1st & 3rd Trinity II		1st & 3rd Trinity II	40
41	Downing III		Wolfson	41	Homerton II		Selwyn II	41
42	Emmanuel II		Selwyn II	42	Magdalene II		Churchill II	42
43	Wolfson		1st & 3rd Trinity III	43	Downing II		Vet School	43
44	Girton II		Downing III	44	Fitzwilliam II		Downing II	44
45	Jesus III		Robinson II	45	Churchill II		Jesus III	45
46	1st & 3rd Trinity III		Hughes Hall	46	Vet School		Magdalene II	46
47	Robinson II		Girton II	47	Jesus III		Caius II	47
48	Hughes Hall		Corpus Christi II	48	Caius II		Fitzwilliam II	48
49	Corpus Christi II		Jesus III	49	Darwin II		Pembroke II	49
50	Clare III		Darwin	50	Clare II		Clare II	50
51	Clare Hall		Clare Hall	51	St. Catharine's III		St. Catharine's III	51
52	Lady Margaret IV		Sidney Sussex II	52	Pembroke II		Darwin II	52
53	Queens' III		Queens' III	53				
54	Darwin		King's II	54				
55	Sidney Sussex II		Christ's III	55				
56	Trinity Hall III		Clare III	56				
57	Churchill III		Lady Margaret IV	57				
58	St. Edmund's		Trinity Hall III	58				
59	King's II		Caius III	59				
60	Christ's III		Churchill III	60				
61	CCAT II		1st & 3rd Trinity IV	61				
62	Caius III		St. Edmund's	62				
63	1st & 3rd Trinity IV		St. Catharine's III	63				
64	St. Catharine's III		CCAT II	64				
65	1st & 3rd Trinity V		1st & 3rd Trinity V	65				
66	Lady Margaret V		Lady Margaret V	66				
67	Darwin II		Clare IV	67				
68	Clare IV		Churchill IV	68				
69	Churchill IV		Darwin II	69				
