= Lent Bumps 2005 =

The Lent Bumps 2005 were a series of rowing races held at Cambridge University from Tuesday 1 March to Saturday 5 March 2005. The event was run as a bumps race and was one of the series of Lent Bumps which have been held annually in late February or early March since 1887. See Lent Bumps for the format of the races. In 2005, a total of 121 crews took part (69 men's crews and 52 women's crews), with nearly 1100 participants.

== Head of the River crews ==
Caius men rowed-over in 1st position, retaining the headship for the 4th consecutive year.

Downing women rowed-over in 1st position for the 2nd year in a row, their first successful defence over the headship.

== Highest 2nd VIIIs ==
The highest men's 2nd VIII for the 6th consecutive year was Caius II, despite losing their place in the 1st division to King's.

The highest women's 2nd VIII for the 5th consecutive year was Jesus II.

== Links to races in other years ==
Preceding year	Current year	Following year
Lent Bumps 2004	Lent Bumps 2005	Lent Bumps 2006
May Bumps 2004	May Bumps 2005	May Bumps 2006

== Bumps Charts ==
Below are the bumps charts for all 4 men's and all 3 women's divisions, with the men's event on the left and women's event on the right. The bumps chart represents the progress of every crew over all four days of the racing. To follow the progress of any particular crew, simply find the crew's name on the left side of the chart and follow the line to the end-of-the-week finishing position on the right of the chart.

Note that this chart may not be displayed correctly if you are using a large font size on your browser.

Pos	Crew	Men's Bumps Chart	Crew	Pos	Crew	Women's Bumps Chart	Crew	Pos
1	Caius		Caius	1	Downing		Downing	1
2	1st & 3rd Trinity		1st & 3rd Trinity	2	Emmanuel		Clare	2
3	Downing		Downing	3	Caius		Caius	3
4	Trinity Hall		Lady Margaret	4	Jesus		Emmanuel	4
5	Emmanuel		Jesus	5	Clare		Jesus	5
6	Lady Margaret		Emmanuel	6	Lady Margaret		Lady Margaret	6
7	Jesus		Churchill	7	Trinity Hall		1st & 3rd Trinity	7
8	Churchill		Trinity Hall	8	Newnham		Newnham	8
9	St. Catharine's		Selwyn	9	Girton		Pembroke	9
10	Robinson		Queens'	10	Churchill		Girton	10
11	Selwyn		Clare	11	Pembroke		Trinity Hall	11
12	Queens'		St. Catharine's	12	Christ's		Churchill	12
13	Christ's		Robinson	13	1st & 3rd Trinity		Christ's	13
14	Clare		Pembroke	14	Queens'		Selwyn	14
15	Pembroke		Christ's	15	Selwyn		Queens'	15
16	Magdalene		Magdalene	16	New Hall		St. Catharine's	16
17	Caius II		King's	17	St. Catharine's		New Hall	17
18	Fitzwilliam		Caius II	18	Jesus II		Fitzwilliam	18
19	King's		Fitzwilliam	19	Robinson		Robinson	19
20	Girton		Girton	20	Sidney Sussex		Jesus II	20
21	Peterhouse		Lady Margaret II	21	Magdalene		Sidney Sussex	21
22	Lady Margaret II		Peterhouse	22	Fitzwilliam		King's	22
23	CCAT		Sidney Sussex	23	Emmanuel II		Magdalene	23
24	Sidney Sussex		Downing II	24	Darwin		Peterhouse	24
25	Downing II		CCAT	25	King's		Darwin	25
26	1st & 3rd Trinity II		Wolfson	26	CCAT		Lady Margaret II	26
27	Queens' II		1st & 3rd Trinity II	27	Peterhouse		Emmanuel II	27
28	Wolfson		Queens' II	28	Newnham II		CCAT	28
29	Jesus II		Darwin	29	Wolfson		St. Edmund's	29
30	Corpus Christi		Jesus II	30	Lady Margaret II		Newnham II	30
31	Churchill II		Trinity Hall II	31	St. Edmund's		Wolfson	31
32	Emmanuel II		Churchill II	32	New Hall II		Caius II	32
33	Darwin		Pembroke II	33	Homerton		St. Catharine's II	33
34	Lady Margaret III		Corpus Christi	34	St. Catharine's II		Queens' II	34
35	Christ's II		Emmanuel II	35	Queens' II		New Hall II	35
36	Robinson II		Robinson II	36	Corpus Christi		Pembroke II	36
37	Pembroke II		Homerton	37	Caius II		Homerton	37
38	Trinity Hall II		Lady Margaret III	38	Clare Hall		Corpus Christi	38
39	St. Catharine's II		Selwyn II	39	Pembroke II		Clare Hall	39
40	Homerton		Christ's II	40	Girton II		Lucy Cavendish	40
41	Clare II		Clare II	41	Lucy Cavendish		Downing II	41
42	Selwyn II		1st & 3rd Trinity III	42	Trinity Hall II		Girton II	42
43	Jesus III		St. Catharine's II	43	Downing II		Trinity Hall II	43
44	Downing III		Caius III	44	Clare II		Jesus III	44
45	1st & 3rd Trinity III		Jesus III	45	Jesus III		Clare II	45
46	Peterhouse II		Fitzwilliam II	46	1st & 3rd Trinity II		1st & 3rd Trinity II	46
47	Fitzwilliam II		Peterhouse II	47	Pembroke III		Newnham III	47
48	1st & 3rd Trinity IV		Queens' III	48	Homerton II		Pembroke III	48
49	Girton II		Downing III	49	Newnham III		Churchill II	49
50	Caius III		1st & 3rd Trinity IV	50	Newnham IV		Lady Margaret III	50
51	Sidney Sussex II		Girton II	51	Churchill II		Homerton II	51
52	Queens' III		St. Edmund's	52	Lady Margaret III		Newnham IV	52
53	Hughes Hall		Magdalene II	53				
54	St. Edmund's		Sidney Sussex II	54				
55	Clare Hall		Hughes Hall	55				
56	Magdalene II		Clare Hall	56				
57	Corpus Christi II		King's II	57				
58	King's II		Wolfson II	58				
59	Churchill III		Lady Margaret IV	59				
60	Wolfson II		Pembroke III	60				
61	Lady Margaret IV		Corpus Christi II	61				
62	Christ's III		Clare III	62				
63	Pembroke III		Churchill III	63				
64	Darwin II		Christ's III	64				
65	Clare III		Magdalene III	65				
66	Robinson III		Robinson III	66				
67	Magdalene III		Selwyn III	67				
68	Emmanuel III		Darwin II	68				
69	Selwyn III		Emmanuel III	69				
