= Lent Bumps 2003 =

Rowing regatta

The Lent Bumps 2003 were a series of rowing races held at Cambridge University from Tuesday 25 February 2003 until Saturday 1 March 2003. The event was run as a bumps race and has been held annually in late-February or early March since 1887. See Lent Bumps for the format of the races. In 2003, a total of 121 crews took part (69 men's crews and 52 women's crews), with nearly 1100 participants.

== Head of the River crews ==
Caius men rowed-over in 1st position, retaining the headship.

Caius women bumped Lady Margaret, Jesus and Emmanuel to take their first ever women's headship of the Lent Bumps.

Caius also held both the double headship in the May Bumps 2002, meaning that all four headships were held by the same club simultaneously – the first time this has ever happened in bumps history.

== Highest 2nd VIIIs ==
The highest men's 2nd VIII for the 4th consecutive year was Caius II.

The highest women's 2nd VIII for the 3rd consecutive year was Jesus II.

== Links to races in other years ==
Preceding year	Current year	Following year
Lent Bumps 2002	Lent Bumps 2003	Lent Bumps 2004
May Bumps 2002	May Bumps 2003	May Bumps 2004

== Bumps Charts ==
Below are the bumps charts for the 1st and 2nd divisions, with the men's event on the left and women's event on the right. The bumps chart represents the progress of every crew over all four days of the racing. To follow the progress of any particular crew, simply find the crew's name on the left side of the chart and follow the line to the end-of-the-week finishing position on the right of the chart.

Pos	Crew	Men's Bumps Chart	Crew	Pos	Crew	Women's Bumps Chart	Crew	Pos
1	Caius		Caius	1	Emmanuel		Caius	1
2	Lady Margaret		1st & 3rd Trinity	2	Jesus		Emmanuel	2
3	1st & 3rd Trinity		Downing	3	Lady Margaret		Downing	3
4	Emmanuel		Lady Margaret	4	Caius		Jesus	4
5	Christ's		Jesus	5	Downing		Lady Margaret	5
6	Downing		Trinity Hall	6	Trinity Hall		Clare	6
7	Jesus		Emmanuel	7	Newnham		Newnham	7
8	Trinity Hall		Churchill	8	Christ's		Churchill	8
9	St. Catharine's		Christ's	9	Queens'		Trinity Hall	9
10	Robinson		St. Catharine's	10	Clare		Queens'	10
11	Churchill		Selwyn	11	New Hall		Christ's	11
12	Clare		Robinson	12	Churchill		Girton	12
13	Selwyn		Clare	13	Pembroke		Pembroke	13
14	Caius II		Caius II	14	Girton		1st & 3rd Trinity	14
15	Pembroke		Queens'	15	1st & 3rd Trinity		New Hall	15
16	Sidney Sussex		Pembroke	16	St. Catharine's		Sidney Sussex	16
17	Girton		Fitzwilliam	17	Sidney Sussex		Selwyn	17
18	Fitzwilliam		Girton	18	Selwyn		St. Catharine's	18
19	Queens'		Lady Margaret II	19	Jesus II		Magdalene	19
20	Magdalene		Sidney Sussex	20	CCAT		Jesus II	20
21	Downing II		Magdalene	21	Fitzwilliam		Robinson	21
22	Lady Margaret II		Peterhouse	22	Magdalene		CCAT	22
23	1st & 3rd Trinity II		King's	23	Lady Margaret II		Darwin	23
24	Peterhouse		Downing II	24	King's		Fitzwilliam	24
25	King's		1st & 3rd Trinity II	25	Robinson		Peterhouse	25
26	Jesus II		CCAT	26	Emmanuel II		Lady Margaret II	26
27	Christ's II		Jesus II	27	Darwin		Emmanuel II	27
28	Emmanuel II		Corpus Christi	28	Peterhouse		King's	28
29	CCAT		Emmanuel II	29	Wolfson		New Hall II	29
30	Corpus Christi		Queens' II	30	New Hall II		Newnham II	30
31	Wolfson		Christ's II	31	Homerton		Wolfson	31
32	Trinity Hall II		Wolfson	32	Newnham II		Addenbrooke's	32
33	Queens' II		Churchill II	33	Addenbrooke's		Homerton	33
34	Churchill II		Robinson	34	Clare Hall		Queens' II	34
