= May Bumps 2001 =

Rowing races at Cambridge University

The May Bumps 2001 were a set of rowing races held at Cambridge University from Wednesday 13 June 2001 to Saturday 16 June 2001. The event was run as a bumps race and was the 110th set of races in the series of May Bumps that have been held annually in mid-June since 1887. In 2001, a total of 172 crews took part (103 men's crews and 69 women's crews), with around 1500 participants in total.

The Homerton Men's 1st VIII recorded the most places advanced during one series of bumps (either Mays, Lents, or Torpids/Eights for Oxford), advancing 13 places in the May Bumps 2001, where the crew moved up a division to division 3 and also won blades - a feat visible in the Bumps Charts below.

== Head of the River crews ==
Emmanuel men bumped Jesus and Caius to take their first ever headship of the May Bumps.

Caius women rowed-over in 1st position retaining the headship.

== Highest 2nd VIIIs ==
The highest men's 2nd VIII for the 2nd consecutive year was Downing II.

The highest women's 2nd VIII was Jesus II, who bumped Newnham II on day 3.

== Links to races in other years ==
Preceding year	Current year	Following year
May Bumps 2000	May Bumps 2001	May Bumps 2002
Lent Bumps 2000	Lent Bumps 2001	Lent Bumps 2002

== Bumps Charts ==
Below are the bumps charts for the first 3 men's and women's divisions. The men's bumps charts are on the left, and women's bumps charts on the right. The bumps chart represents the progress of every crew over all four days of the racing. To follow the progress of any particular crew, simply find the crew's name on the left side of the chart and follow the line to the end-of-the-week finishing position on the right of the chart.

Pos	Crew	Men's Bumps Chart	Crew	Pos	Crew	Women's Bumps Chart	Crew	Pos
1	Caius		Emmanuel	1	Caius		Caius	1
2	Jesus		Downing	2	Emmanuel		Emmanuel	2
3	Emmanuel		Caius	3	Newnham		Jesus	3
4	Downing		Jesus	4	Jesus		Newnham	4
5	1st & 3rd Trinity		Lady Margaret	5	Pembroke		Pembroke	5
6	Lady Margaret		Trinity Hall	6	Clare		Trinity Hall	6
7	Trinity Hall		Christ's	7	Lady Margaret		Lady Margaret	7
8	Christ's		Robinson	8	Trinity Hall		Clare	8
9	Pembroke		1st & 3rd Trinity	9	Downing		Downing	9
10	Churchill		Churchill	10	Churchill		Churchill	10
11	Queens'		St. Catharine's	11	Christ's		St. Catharine's	11
12	Robinson		Clare	12	Queens'		New Hall	12
13	Fitzwilliam		Pembroke	13	Robinson		Christ's	13
14	St. Catharine's		Selwyn	14	St. Catharine's		Selwyn	14
15	Clare		Queens'	15	New Hall		Queens'	15
16	Peterhouse		Fitzwilliam	16	Selwyn		Girton	16
17	Selwyn		Magdalene	17	1st & 3rd Trinity		Robinson	17
18	Magdalene		Sidney Sussex	18	CCAT		Peterhouse	18
19	Downing II		Downing II	19	Girton		CCAT	19
20	1st & 3rd Trinity II		Peterhouse	20	Magdalene		Magdalene	20
21	Lady Margaret II		Emmanuel II	21	Homerton		1st & 3rd Trinity	21
22	Girton		Girton	22	Peterhouse		Darwin	22
23	Sidney Sussex		Lady Margaret II	23	Newnham II		Sidney Sussex	23
24	Emmanuel II		Caius II	24	Fitzwilliam		King's	24
25	Caius II		Jesus II	25	Sidney Sussex		Homerton	25
26	Jesus II		1st & 3rd Trinity II	26	Darwin		Fitzwilliam	26
27	King's		Queens' II	27	Jesus II		Jesus II	27
28	Trinity Hall II		Wolfson	28	King's		Lady Margaret II	28
29	Queens' II		King's	29	Emmanuel II		Newnham II	29
30	Wolfson		CCAT	30	Wolfson		Caius II	30
31	Corpus Christi		Corpus Christi	31	Corpus Christi		Wolfson	31
32	CCAT		Trinity Hall II	32	Lady Margaret II		Emmanuel II	32
33	Churchill II		St. Catharine's II	33	Caius II		Trinity Hall II	33
34	Pembroke II		Pembroke II	34	New Hall II		Corpus Christi	34
35	Christ's II		Christ's II	35	Clare II		Clare II	35
36	Clare II		Clare II	36	Trinity Hall II		Lady Margaret III	36
37	Robinson II		Churchill II	37	Queens' II		New Hall II	37
38	St. Catharine's II		Darwin	38	Churchill II		Pembroke II	38
39	Darwin		Robinson II	39	Lady Margaret III		Churchill II	39
40	1st & 3rd Trinity III		Homerton	40	Homerton II		Downing II	40
41	Selwyn II		Selwyn II	41	Jesus III		Queens' II	41
42	Girton II		Downing III	42	Pembroke II		Girton II	42
43	Fitzwilliam II		St Edmund's	43	Downing II		1st & 3rd Trinity II	43
44	Peterhouse II		Girton II	44	1st & 3rd Trinity II		Homerton II	44
45	Downing III		Lady Margaret III	45	Jesus IV		Hughes Hall	45
46	Lady Margaret III		Fitzwilliam II	46	CCAT II		Jesus III	46
47	St Edmund's		Sidney Sussex II	47	Girton II		St. Catharine's II	47
48	Magdalene II		Jesus III	48	St. Catharine's II		Jesus IV	48
49	Sidney Sussex II		1st & 3rd Trinity III	49	Hughes Hall		Vet School	49
50	Jesus III		Peterhouse II	50	Magdalene II		CCAT II	50
51	Corpus Christi II		1st & 3rd Trinity IV	51	Vet School		Darwin II	51
