= May Bumps 2000 =

Rowing races at Cambridge University

The May Bumps 2000 were a set of rowing races held at Cambridge University from Wednesday 14 June 2000 to Saturday 17 June 2000. The event was run as a bumps race and was the 109th set of races in the series of May Bumps which have been held annually in mid-June since 1887. In 2000, a total of 172 crews took part (103 men's crews and 69 women's crews), with around 1500 participants in total.

== Head of the River crews ==
Caius men rowed-over in 1st position, achieving the headship for the 3rd consecutive year.

Caius women bumped Newnham and Emmanuel to take their first ever women's headship.

This is the first year in bumps history that the same club finished Head of the River in both the men's and women's events.

== Highest 2nd VIIIs ==
The highest men's 2nd VIII at the end of the week was Downing II, who bumped 1st & 3rd Trinity II on the last day.

The highest women's 2nd VIII was Newnham II, who bumped Emmanuel II on the 1st day.

== Links to races in other years ==
Preceding year	Current year	Following year
May Bumps 1999	May Bumps 2000	May Bumps 2001
Lent Bumps 1999	Lent Bumps 2000	Lent Bumps 2001

== Bumps Charts ==
Below are the bumps charts for the first four men's and women's divisions. The men's bumps charts are on the left, and women's bumps charts on the right. The bumps chart represents the progress of every crew over all four days of the racing. To follow the progress of any particular crew, simply find the crew's name on the left side of the chart and follow the line to the end-of-the-week finishing position on the right of the chart.

Pos	Crew	Men's Bumps Chart	Crew	Pos	Crew	Women's Bumps Chart	Crew	Pos
1	Caius		Caius	1	Emmanuel		Caius	1
2	Jesus		Jesus	2	Newnham		Emmanuel	2
3	1st & 3rd Trinity		Emmanuel	3	Caius		Newnham	3
4	Lady Margaret		Downing	4	Pembroke		Jesus	4
5	Emmanuel		1st & 3rd Trinity	5	Lady Margaret		Pembroke	5
6	Downing		Lady Margaret	6	Jesus		Clare	6
7	Pembroke		Trinity Hall	7	Trinity Hall		Lady Margaret	7
8	Trinity Hall		Christ's	8	Queens'		Trinity Hall	8
9	Fitzwilliam		Pembroke	9	Clare		Downing	9
10	Queens'		Churchill	10	Churchill		Churchill	10
11	Christ's		Queens'	11	Downing		Christ's	11
12	Churchill		Robinson	12	Christ's		Queens'	12
13	Peterhouse		Fitzwilliam	13	Selwyn		Robinson	13
14	Magdalene		St. Catharine's	14	St. Catharine's		St. Catharine's	14
15	Robinson		Clare	15	Homerton		New Hall	15
16	St. Catharine's		Peterhouse	16	Robinson		Selwyn	16
17	1st & 3rd Trinity II		Selwyn	17	Magdalene		1st & 3rd Trinity	17
18	Clare		Magdalene	18	New Hall		CCAT	18
19	Downing II		Downing II	19	1st & 3rd Trinity		Girton	19
20	Sidney Sussex		1st & 3rd Trinity II	20	Fitzwilliam		Magdalene	20
21	Selwyn		Lady Margaret II	21	CCAT		Homerton	21
22	Caius II		Girton	22	Peterhouse		Peterhouse	22
23	Lady Margaret II		Sidney Sussex	23	Girton		Newnham II	23
24	Girton		Emmanuel II	24	Sidney Sussex		Fitzwilliam	24
25	King's		Caius II	25	Emmanuel II		Sidney Sussex	25
26	Queens' II		Jesus II	26	Newnham II		Darwin	26
27	Emmanuel II		King's	27	Corpus Christi		Jesus II	27
28	Jesus II		Trinity Hall II	28	Darwin		King's	28
29	Churchill II		Queens' II	29	Jesus II		Emmanuel II	29
30	Corpus Christi		Wolfson	30	King's		Wolfson	30
31	Trinity Hall II		Corpus Christi	31	Lady Margaret II		Corpus Christi	31
32	Wolfson		CCAT	32	Clare II		Lady Margaret II	32
33	Pembroke II		Churchill II	33	Queens' II		Caius II	33
34	Christ's II		Pembroke II	34	New Hall II		New Hall II	34
35	Clare II		Christ's II	35	Churchill II		Clare II	35
36	1st & 3rd Trinity III		Clare II	36	Wolfson		Trinity Hall II	36
37	CCAT		Robinson II	37	Trinity Hall II		Queens' II	37
38	St. Catharine's II		St. Catharine's II	38	Caius II		Churchill II	38
39	Fitzwilliam II		Darwin	39	Homerton II		Lady Margaret III	39
40	Robinson II		1st & 3rd Trinity III	40	Jesus III		Homerton II	40
41	Lady Margaret III		Selwyn II	41	Pembroke II		Jesus III	41
42	Peterhouse II		Girton II	42	1st & 3rd Trinity II		Pembroke II	42
43	Selwyn II		Fitzwilliam II	43	Lady Margaret III		Downing II	43
44	Darwin		Peterhouse II	44	St. Catharine's II		1st & 3rd Trinity II	44
45	Girton II		Downing III	45	CCAT II		Jesus IV	45
46	Lady Margaret IV		Lady Margaret III	46	Magdalene II		CCAT II	46
47	Magdalene II		St Edmund's	47	Downing II		Girton II	47
48	Downing III		Magdalene II	48	Girton II		St. Catharine's II	48
49	Jesus III		Sidney Sussex II	49	Jesus IV		Hughes Hall	49
50	St Edmund's		Jesus III	50	Hughes Hall		Magdalene II	50
51	Clare III		Corpus Christi II	51	St Edmund's		Fitzwilliam II	51
52	Corpus Christi II		Lady Margaret IV	52	Fitzwilliam II		Clare Hall	52
53	Sidney Sussex II		Homerton	53	Clare Hall		Caius III	53
54	1st & 3rd Trinity IV		1st & 3rd Trinity IV	54	Robinson II		Sidney Sussex II	54
55	Pembroke III		Pembroke III	55	Caius III		St Edmund's	55
56	Churchill III		Trinity Hall III	56	Selwyn II		1st & 3rd Trinity III	56
57	Queens' III		Clare III	57	Sidney Sussex II		Robinson II	57
58	Jesus IV		King's II	58	1st & 3rd Trinity III		Newnham III	58
59	St. Catharine's III		Jesus IV	59	Newnham III		Selwyn II	59
60	Trinity Hall III		Emmanuel III	60	Clare III		Caius IV	60
61	Homerton		Queens' III	61	Girton III		Girton III	61
62	King's II		St. Catharine's III	62	Jesus V		Jesus V	62
63	Emmanuel III		Christ's III	63	Caius IV		King's II	63
64	Lady Margaret V		Churchill III	64	King's II		Clare III	64
65	Girton III		Girton III	65	Downing III		Emmanuel III	65
66	Downing IV		Selwyn III	66	Wolfson II		Wolfson II	66
67	CCAT II		Lady Margaret V	67	Darwin II		Darwin II	67
68	Selwyn III		CCAT II	68	Emmanuel III		Downing III	68
				69	Trinity Hall III		Trinity Hall III	69
