= Lent Bumps 2001 =

The Lent Bumps 2001 were a series of rowing races held at Cambridge University from Tuesday 27 February 2001 until Thursday 1 March 2001. The event was run as a bumps race and is one of a series of Lent Bumps which have been held annually in late-February or early March since 1887. See Lent Bumps for the format of the races. In 2001, a total of 121 crews took part (69 men's crews and 52 women's crews), with around 1000 participants in total. Several thousand spectators came to watch, particularly on the Saturday.

The bumps were scheduled to run until Saturday 3 March. The racing was cancelled on the Friday and Saturday due to an outbreak of Foot and Mouth disease which forced the closure of the towpath. Since all the umpiring takes place from the towpath, there was no choice but to cancel the remaining races.

Following a dispute in the women's 1st division on Thursday, Girton, 1st & 3rd Trinity and Churchill were scheduled to re-row their race on Friday, but the races were cancelled before the re-row was completed.

== Head of the River crews ==
Because the races were not completed, no headships were awarded. When the races were cancelled, Emmanuel men and Jesus women were in 1st position.

== Highest 2nd VIIIs ==
The highest men's 2nd VIII when the races were cancelled was Caius II.

The highest women's 2nd VIII when the races were cancelled was Jesus II, who bumped Lady Margaret II on the 1st day.

== Links to races in other years ==
Preceding year	Current year	Following year
Lent Bumps 2000	Lent Bumps 2001	Lent Bumps 2002
May Bumps 2000	May Bumps 2001	May Bumps 2002

== Bumps Charts ==
Below are the bumps charts for the 1st and 2nd divisions, with the men's event on the left and women's event on the right. The bumps chart represents the progress of every crew over all four days of the racing. To follow the progress of any particular crew, simply find the crew's name on the left side of the chart and follow the line to the end-of-the-week finishing position on the right of the chart.

Pos	Crew	Men's Bumps Chart	Crew	Pos	Crew	Women's Bumps Chart	Crew	Pos
1	1st & 3rd Trinity		Emmanuel	1	Emmanuel		Jesus	1
2	Caius		1st & 3rd Trinity	2	Jesus		Trinity Hall	2
3	Emmanuel		Caius	3	Newnham		Emmanuel	3
4	Lady Margaret		Lady Margaret	4	Trinity Hall		Lady Margaret	4
5	Christ's		Christ's	5	Pembroke		Newnham	5
6	Trinity Hall		Downing	6	Queens'		Caius	6
7	Jesus		Trinity Hall	7	Caius		Christ's	7
8	Downing		Jesus	8	Lady Margaret		Downing	8
9	Churchill		Robinson	9	Downing		Pembroke	9
10	Robinson		Clare	10	Christ's		Queens'	10
11	Clare		Churchill	11	New Hall		New Hall	11
12	Selwyn		Selwyn	12	Churchill		Clare	12
13	St. Catharine's		St. Catharine's	13	Clare		Churchill	13
14	Fitzwilliam		Girton	14	1st & 3rd Trinity		1st & 3rd Trinity	14
15	Girton		Caius II	15	St. Catharine's		Girton	15
16	Magdalene		Fitzwilliam	16	Girton		Fitzwilliam	16
17	Caius II		Pembroke	17	Selwyn		St. Catharine's	17
