= Lent Bumps 2002 =

The Lent Bumps 2002 were a series of rowing races held at Cambridge University from Wednesday 1 March 2002 until Saturday 4 March 2002. The event was run as a bumps race and has been held annually in late-February or early March since 1887. See Lent Bumps for the format of the races. In 2002, a total of 121 crews took part (69 men's crews and 52 women's crews), with nearly 1100 participants.

The bumps were scheduled to run from Tuesday 28 February. The racing was cancelled on the Tuesday due to extremely strong and gusty winds. Crews in the 1st divisions were unaffected by the cancellation, since the first scheduled race for the top divisions was on Wednesday.

== Head of the River crews ==
Caius men bumped First and Third Trinity and Emmanuel to regain the headship they lost in 2000.

Emmanuel women bumped Trinity Hall and Jesus to take their 10th headship of the Lent Bumps since 1988.

== Highest 2nd VIIIs ==
The highest men's 2nd VIII for the 3rd consecutive year was Caius II.

The highest women's 2nd VIII for the 2nd consecutive year was Jesus II.

== Links to races in other years ==
| Preceding year | Current year | Following year |
|---|---|---|
| Lent Bumps 2001 | Lent Bumps 2002 | Lent Bumps 2003 |
| May Bumps 2001 | May Bumps 2002 | May Bumps 2003 |

== Bumps Charts ==
Below are the bumps charts for the 1st and 2nd divisions, with the men's event on the left and women's event on the right. The bumps chart represents the progress of every crew over all four days of the racing. To follow the progress of any particular crew, simply find the crew's name on the left side of the chart and follow the line to the end-of-the-week finishing position on the right of the chart.

| Pos | Crew | Men's Bumps Chart | Crew | Pos | Crew | Women's Bumps Chart | Crew | Pos |
|---|---|---|---|---|---|---|---|---|
| 1 | Emmanuel | | Caius | 1 | Jesus | | Emmanuel | 1 |
| 2 | 1st & 3rd Trinity | | Lady Margaret | 2 | Trinity Hall | | Jesus | 2 |
| 3 | Caius | | 1st & 3rd Trinity | 3 | Emmanuel | | Lady Margaret | 3 |
| 4 | Lady Margaret | | Emmanuel | 4 | Lady Margaret | | Caius | 4 |
| 5 | Christ's | | Christ's | 5 | Newnham | | Downing | 5 |
| 6 | Downing | | Downing | 6 | Caius | | Trinity Hall | 6 |
| 7 | Trinity Hall | | Jesus | 7 | Christ's | | Newnham | 7 |
| 8 | Jesus | | Trinity Hall | 8 | Downing | | Christ's | 8 |
| 9 | Robinson | | St. Catharine's | 9 | Pembroke | | Queens' | 9 |
| 10 | Clare | | Robinson | 10 | Queens' | | Clare | 10 |
| 11 | Churchill | | Churchill | 11 | New Hall | | New Hall | 11 |
| 12 | Selwyn | | Clare | 12 | Clare | | Churchill | 12 |
| 13 | St. Catharine's | | Selwyn | 13 | Churchill | | Pembroke | 13 |
| 14 | Girton | | Caius II | 14 | 1st & 3rd Trinity | | Girton | 14 |
| 15 | Caius II | | Pembroke | 15 | Girton | | 1st & 3rd Trinity | 15 |
| 16 | Fitzwilliam | | Sidney Sussex | 16 | Fitzwilliam | | St. Catharine's | 16 |
| 17 | Pembroke | | Girton | 17 | St. Catharine's | | Sidney Sussex | 17 |
