= May Bumps 2002 =

Rowing races at Cambridge University

The May Bumps 2002 were a set of rowing races held at Cambridge University from Wednesday 12 June 2002 to Saturday 15 June 2002. The event was run as a bumps race and was the 111th set of races in the series of May Bumps that have been held annually in mid-June in this form since 1887. In 2002, a total of 172 crews took part (103 men's crews and 69 women's crews), with around 1500 participants in total.

== Head of the River crews ==
Caius men bumped Emmanuel and Downing to take back the headship they lost in 2001, achieving the headship for the 4th time since 1998.

Caius women rowed-over in 1st position, achieving the headship for the 3rd consecutive year (being head for 11 consecutive days - the 2nd longest ever defence of the women's Mays headship)

== Highest 2nd VIIIs ==
The highest men's 2nd VIII for the 3rd consecutive year was Downing II.

The highest women's 2nd VIII for the 2nd consecutive year was Jesus II.

== Links to races in other years ==
Preceding year	Current year	Following year
May Bumps 2001	May Bumps 2002	May Bumps 2003
Lent Bumps 2001	Lent Bumps 2002	Lent Bumps 2003

== Bumps charts ==
Below are the bumps charts for the men's and women's 1st divisions. The men's bumps charts are on the left, and women's bumps charts on the right. The bumps chart represents the progress of every crew over all four days of the racing. To follow the progress of any particular crew, simply find the crew's name on the left side of the chart and follow the line to the end-of-the-week finishing position on the right of the chart.

Pos	Crew	Men's Bumps Chart	Crew	Pos	Crew	Women's Bumps Chart	Crew	Pos
1	Emmanuel		Caius	1	Caius		Caius	1
2	Downing		Downing	2	Emmanuel		Emmanuel	2
3	Caius		Lady Margaret	3	Jesus		Jesus	3
4	Jesus		Emmanuel	4	Newnham		Newnham	4
5	Lady Margaret		Trinity Hall	5	Pembroke		Downing	5
6	Trinity Hall		Jesus	6	Trinity Hall		Pembroke	6
7	Christ's		Robinson	7	Lady Margaret		St. Catharine's	7
8	Robinson		St. Catharine's	8	Clare		Trinity Hall	8
9	1st & 3rd Trinity		1st & 3rd Trinity	9	Downing		Lady Margaret	9
10	Churchill		Clare	10	Churchill		New Hall	10
11	St. Catharine's		Christ's	11	St. Catharine's		Christ's	11
12	Clare		Queens'	12	New Hall		Clare	12
13	Pembroke		Magdalene	13	Christ's		Churchill	13
14	Selwyn		Churchill	14	Selwyn		Selwyn	14
15	Queens'		Pembroke	15	Queens'		Peterhouse	15
16	Fitzwilliam		Sidney Sussex	16	Girton		Girton	16
17	Magdalene		Selwyn	17	Robinson		CCAT	17
