= Lent Bumps =

Set of rowing races in Cambridge, UK

- Head of the River (The Headship)
Caius Men	Jesus College Women
Highest 2^{nd} Eight (Men)	Caius (Division II)
Highest 2^{nd} Eight (Women)	Jesus College (Division II)
Course	Cam (upstream)
Course length	c. 2200m for the Head boat
- Note: Last Lents 3-7 March 2026
- CUCBC - Lents

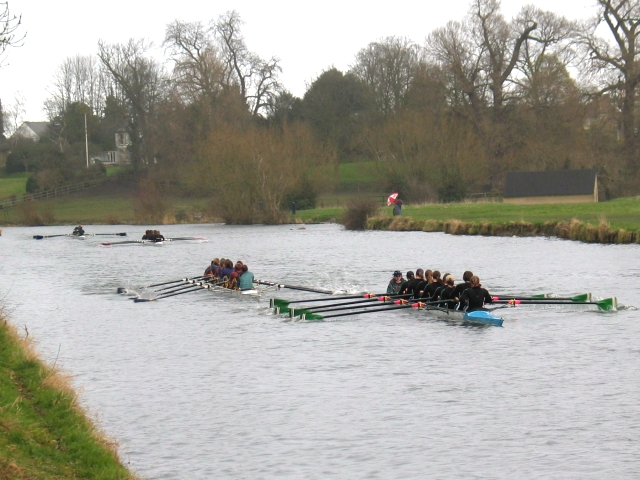
1st & 3rd Trinity 1st Women about to overbump Girton in the women's 1st division on day 3 of the 2005 Lent Bumps

The Lent Bumps (also Lent Races, Lents) are a set of rowing races held annually on the River Cam in Cambridge. They began in 1887, after separating from the May Bumps, which are bumping races held in mid-June. Prior to the separation there had been a single set of annual bumps dating from its inception in 1827. The races are open to all college boat clubs from the University of Cambridge, the University Medical and Veterinary Schools and Anglia Ruskin Boat Club. The Lent Bumps take place over five days (Tuesday to Saturday) at the end of February / start of March and are run as bumps races.

== Structure ==
The races are run in divisions, each containing 17 crews. The number of crews in each bottom division varies yearly depending on new entrants. Each crew consists of eight rowers and one coxswain. Unlike the May Bumps, rowers trialling for places in university crews are not allowed to take part in the Lents. A total of 120 crews took part in 2020, totalling around 1080 participants. There are currently four open divisions (referred to as O1, O2 ... O4) and four divisions for women's crews (similarly W1 to W4). Both O4 and W4 are "short" divisions which marshall together; W4 goes off 5 minutes separated from O4 whereas other divisions are separated by 40 minutes. The divisions represent an overall race order, with Division 1 at the top. The ultimate aim is to try to finish Head of the River (also said as gaining the 'Headship'), i.e. first position in Division 1.

At the start, signalled by a cannon, each crew's coxswain holds onto a chain attached to the bank. Chain points are 150 ft (approx. 45 m) apart, meaning each crew is separated by a distance of about 1½ boat lengths (approximately 30 m or 90 ft) of clear water. Once the race has begun, a crew must attempt to catch up with the crew ahead of it and bump (physically touch or overtake it) before the crew behind does the same to them. A crew which bumps or is bumped must pull to the side of the river to allow other crews to continue racing. A crew which neither bumps the crew ahead nor is bumped by the crew behind before crossing the finishing post is said to have rowed over. Any crew which bumps then swaps places with the crew that it bumped in the following day's racing. A crew which rows over stays in the same position. Crews finishing at the top of a division, the sandwich boat, row at the bottom of the next division to try to move up a division. The process is repeated over four effective days, allowing crews to move up or down in the overall order of boats. The finish order of one year's Lent Bumps is then used as the starting order of the following year's races. Due to the shortness of reliable daylight, the races are actually currently run over five days, with one division level dropped out each day except Saturday: on Tuesday M/W 1, on Wednesday 2, Thursday 3 and Friday 4.

Between 2010 and 2019, the leading men's and women's crews of the Lent Bumps went on to race the leading Oxford Torpids men's and women's crews at the Henley Boat Races around Easter. However, following the move of The Lightweight Boat Races to the Championship Course, this competition ceased to be held.

== Crews finishing Head of the River ==
=== Men's Lent Bumps (1887–2026) ===
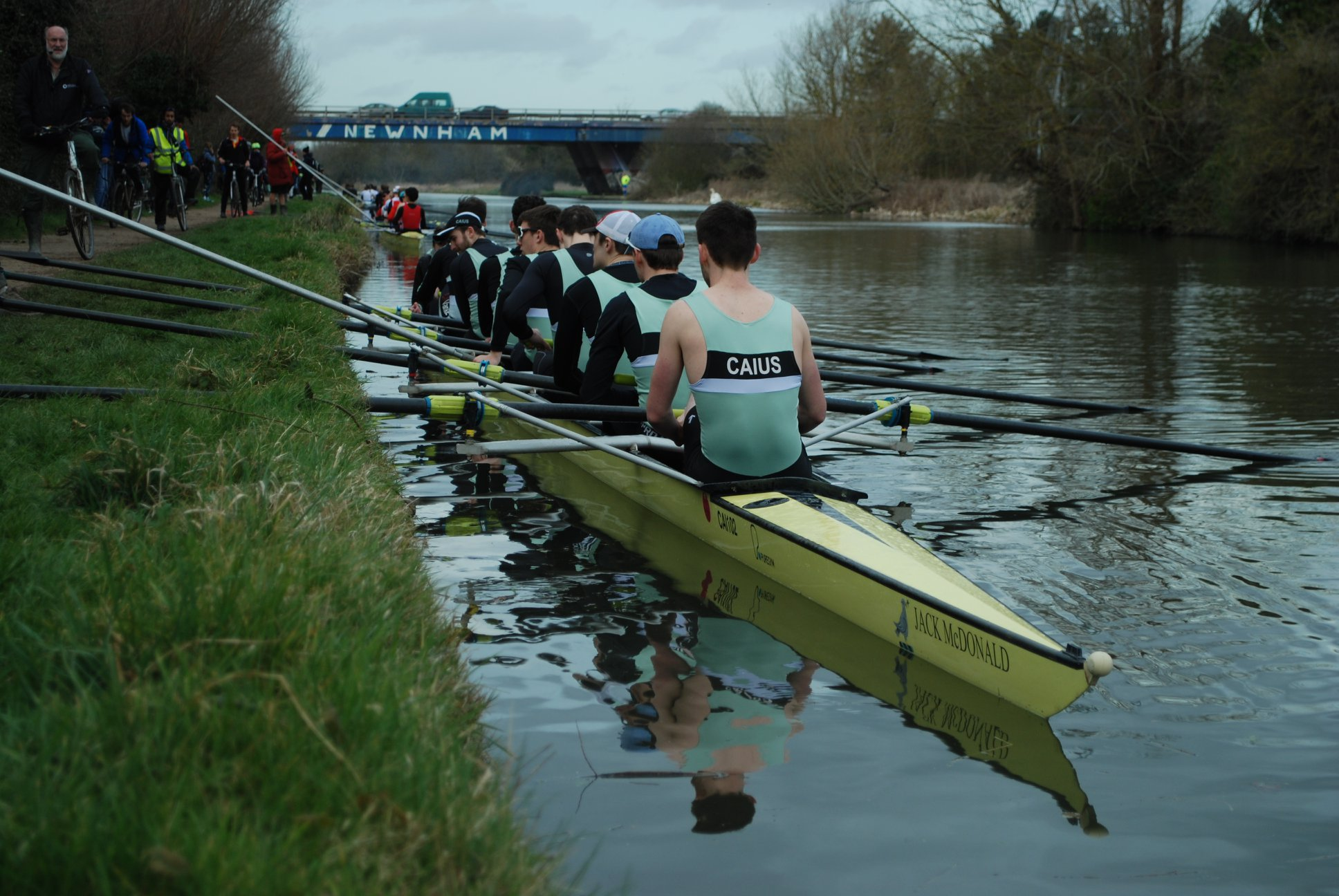
Caius just before the start gun on Saturday of Lents 2019.

1887	Corpus Christi	1889	Lady Margaret	1890	Trinity Hall	1891	Corpus Christi	1892	1st Trinity	1893	1st Trinity
1894	1st Trinity	1896	1st Trinity	1897	Lady Margaret	1898	1st Trinity	1899	1st Trinity	1900	1st Trinity
1901	1st Trinity	1902	1st Trinity	1903	Lady Margaret	1904	1st Trinity	1905	Jesus	1906	Jesus
1907	Jesus	1908	Jesus	1909	Jesus	1910	Jesus	1911	Jesus	1912	Jesus
1913	1st Trinity	1914	Jesus	1919	1st Trinity II	1920	Lady Margaret	1921	1st Trinity	1922	Jesus
1923	Jesus	1924	Jesus	1925	1st Trinity	1926	Jesus	1927	Jesus	1928	1st Trinity
1929	Jesus	1930	Emmanuel	1931	Pembroke	1932	Jesus	1933	Pembroke	1934	Jesus
1935	Jesus	1936	Jesus	1937	Jesus	1938	Jesus	1939	Clare	1940	Jesus
1941	Jesus	1942	Pembroke	1943	Lady Margaret	1944	Jesus	1945	Jesus	1946	Jesus
1947	Jesus	1948	Trinity Hall	1949	Lady Margaret	1950	Lady Margaret	1951	1st & 3rd Trinity	1952	Jesus
1953	Jesus	1954	Lady Margaret	1955	Jesus	1956	Peterhouse	1957	Jesus	1958	1st & 3rd Trinity
1959	Jesus	1960	Jesus	1961	Jesus	1962	Jesus	1964	Jesus	1965	Lady Margaret
1966	Lady Margaret	1967	1st & 3rd Trinity	1968	Queens'	1969	Fitzwilliam	1970	Jesus	1971	1st & 3rd Trinity
1972	Jesus	1973	Clare	1974	Jesus	1975	Lady Margaret	1976	Lady Margaret	1977	Lady Margaret
1978	Lady Margaret	1979	Lady Margaret	1980	Lady Margaret	1981	Lady Margaret	1982	Trinity Hall	1983	Trinity Hall
1984	Downing	1985	Downing	1986	Downing	1987	Downing	1988	Downing	1989	Pembroke
1990	Lady Margaret	1991	Trinity Hall	1992	Trinity Hall	1993	Trinity Hall	1994	Downing	1995	Downing
1996	Downing	1997	Downing	1998	1st & 3rd Trinity	1999	Caius	2000	1st & 3rd Trinity	2001	No result
2002	Caius	2003	Caius	2004	Caius	2005	Caius	2006	Caius	2007	1st & 3rd Trinity
2008	1st & 3rd Trinity	2009	1st & 3rd Trinity	2010	1st & 3rd Trinity	2011	Caius	2012	Caius	2013	Caius
2014	Downing	2015	Caius	2016	Caius	2017	Lady Margaret	2018	Lady Margaret	2019	Caius
2020	Lady Margaret	2022	Lady Margaret	2023	Lady Margaret	2024	Lady Margaret	2025	Lady Margaret	2026	Caius

Lent Bumps were cancelled from 1915 to 1918 due to war, and in 1895 and 1963 due to ice; in 2018 two days were lost to the towpath being too icy for bank parties and umpires; in 2023, the Friday day was lost due to high rainfall and resulting high stream. The Lents in 1888 were not completed due to the death of an oarsman. When the races ceased, Jesus were in 1st position. The Lent Bumps 2001 were not completed due to an outbreak of Foot and Mouth disease in the UK. The outbreak closed the towpath along the river, where all of the umpiring for the bumps takes place. When the races were abandoned on Friday 2 March 2001, Emmanuel were in 1st position. The Lents were also cancelled in 2021 due to the COVID-19 pandemic.

In 1919, college 1st VIIIs did not race as it was the first race after World War I. The start order for the 1920 races was the finish order for the 1914 races. Prior to 1946 1st & 3rd Trinity were two separate rowing clubs: 1st Trinity and 3rd Trinity, hence both separate and combined titles.

=== Women's Lent Bumps (1976–2025) ===
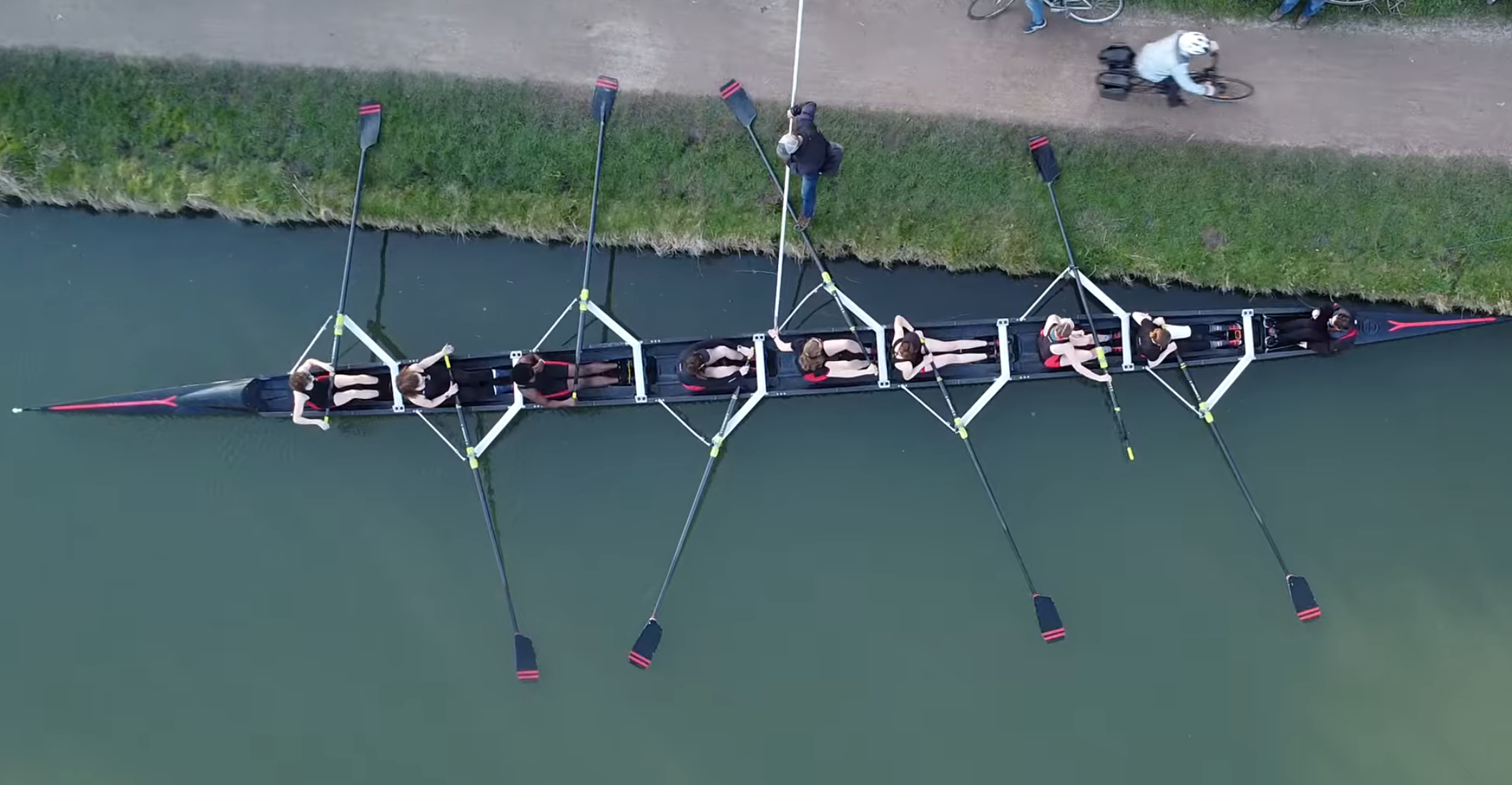
Jesus being poled off at about 30 seconds before the gun, Lents 2026, Thursday

1976	New Hall	1977	Newnham	1978	New Hall	1979	Girton	1980	New Hall	1981	Girton
1982	Newnham	1983	Newnham	1984	Churchill	1985	Jesus	1986	Jesus	1987	Jesus
1988	Emmanuel	1989	Emmanuel	1990	Emmanuel	1991	Emmanuel	1992	Lady Margaret	1993	Lady Margaret
1994	Emmanuel	1995	Emmanuel	1996	Trinity Hall	1997	Emmanuel	1998	Emmanuel	1999	Trinity Hall
2000	Emmanuel	2001	No result	2002	Emmanuel	2003	Caius	2004	Downing	2005	Downing
2006	Clare	2007	1st & 3rd Trinity	2008	1st & 3rd Trinity	2009	Emmanuel	2010	1st & 3rd Trinity	2011	Downing
2012	Downing	2013	Downing	2014	1st & 3rd Trinity	2015	Christ's	2016	Jesus	2017	Jesus
2018	Jesus	2019	Newnham	2020	Downing	2022	Newnham	2023	Jesus	2024	Jesus
2025	Jesus	2026	Jesus								

NB. The Lent Bumps were not completed in 2001 due to an outbreak of Foot and Mouth disease in the UK. When the races were abandoned on Friday 2 March 2001, Jesus were in 1st position. The Lents were also cancelled in 2021 due to the COVID-19 pandemic.

=== Table of Winning Boats (1887–2026) ===
Nineteen boats have been head of the river.

Blade	Boat	Head of the River : Men	Head of the River : Women	Head of the River : Total	Winning years : Men	Winning years : Women
Jesus College Boat Club	Jesus	39	10	49	1905–12, 1914, 1922–24, 1926–27, 1929, 1932, 1934–38, 1940–41, 1944–47, 1952–53, 1955, 1957, 1959–64, 1970, 1972, 1974	1985–87, 2016–18, 2023–26
	Trinity (Combined)	25	4	29	1892–96, 1898–1902, 1904, 1913, 1919*, 1921, 1925, 1951, 1958, 1967, 1971, 1998, 2000, 2007–10	2007–08, 2010, 2014
Lady Margaret Boat Club	Lady Margaret	25	2	27	1889, 1897, 1903, 1920, 1943, 1949–50, 1954, 1965–66, 1975–81, 1990, 2017–18, 2020–25	1992–93
Downing College Boat Club	Downing	10	6	16	1984–88, 1994–97, 2014	2004–05, 2011–13, 2020
	1st Trinity	15	n/a	15	1892–96, 1898–1902, 1904, 1913, 1919*, 1921, 1925	n/a
First and Third Trinity Boat Club	1st & 3rd Trinity	10	4	14	1951, 1958, 1967, 1971, 1998, 2000, 2007–10	2007–08, 2010, 2014
Caius Boat Club	Caius	13	1	14	1999, 2002–06, 2011–13, 2015–16, 2019, 2026	2003
Emmanuel Boat Club	Emmanuel	1	11	12	1930	1988–91, 1994–95, 1997–98, 2000, 2002, 2009
Trinity Hall Boat Club	Trinity Hall	7	2	9	1890, 1948, 1982–83, 1991–93	1996, 1999
Newnham College Boat Club	Newnham	n/a	5	5	n/a	1977, 1982–83, 2019, 2022
Pembroke College Boat Club (Cambridge)	Pembroke	4	-	4	1931, 1933, 1942, 1989	-
Clare Boat Club	Clare	2	1	3	1939, 1973	2006
New Hall Boat Club	New Hall (Murray Edwards)	n/a	3	3	n/a	1976, 1978, 1980
Corpus Christi Boat Club	Corpus Christi	2	-	2	1887, 1891	-
Girton College Boat Club	Girton	-	2	2	-	1979, 1981
Churchill College Boat Club	Churchill	-	1	1	-	1984
Fitzwilliam College Boat Club	Fitzwilliam	1	-	1	1969	-
Peterhouse Boat Club	Peterhouse	1	-	1	1956	-
Queens' College Boat Club	Queens’	1	-	1	1968	-
Christ's College Boat Club	Christ's	-	1	1	-	2015

* The head of the river in 1919 was, unusually, 1st Trinity’s second boat. It was the first race after World War I and 1st eights did not race. The start order for the 1920 races was the finish order for the 1914 races.

Prior to 1946 1st & 3rd Trinity were two separate rowing clubs: 1st Trinity and 3rd Trinity, hence both separate and combined titles.

Anglia Ruskin, Clare Hall, Darwin, Homerton, Hughes Hall, King's, Lucy Cavendish, Magdalene, Robinson, St. Catharine's, Selwyn, Sidney Sussex, St Edmund's, Wolfson, Addenbrooke's and the Veterinary School are the regular entrants never to have finished Head of the River in either the men's or women's events.

== See also ==
- Links to individual Lent Bumps results
- May Bumps, the equivalent event in the summer
- Torpids, a similar event in Oxford
