= Lucy Cavendish College Boat Club =

British rowing club

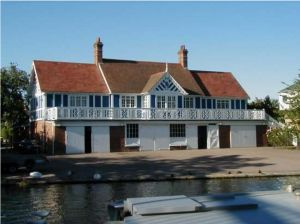

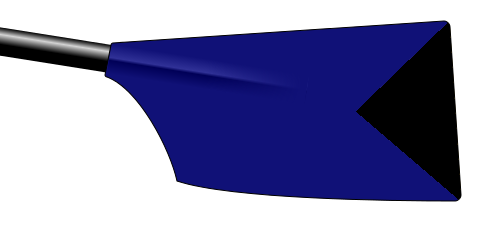
- Location: Emmanuel Boat Club, 1 Cutter Ferry Lane, Cambridge
- Coordinates: 52.210751°N 0.134524°E
- Home water: River Cam
- Founded: 1979
- Membership: Lucy Cavendish College, University of Cambridge
- Affiliations: CUCBC British Rowing (boat code LCC)
- Website: www.lccbc.org.uk
- Acronym: LCCBC

Lucy Cavendish College Boat Club (LCCBC) is the rowing club for students and members of Lucy Cavendish College, Cambridge. It is primarily based at Emmanuel Boat Club, Cutter Ferry Lane, Cambridge.

== History ==
The boat club was originally founded in 1979. Borrowing from the college's coat of arms, the club rows with blades coloured blue, which may represent the River Cam, with a black triangle to indicate the dark fenland soil of Cambridgeshire.

In 2003 there was an official merger with the boat club of Hughes Hall, another constituent college of the University of Cambridge. The result was a combined club formally recognised by the Cambridge University Combined Boat Clubs as the "Hughes Hall/Lucy Cavendish Combined Boat Club". This combination was the only one of its type at Cambridge.

After the merger of the two clubs, Hughes Hall and Lucy Cavendish enjoyed significant advances marked by three squads winning blades during the May Bumps 2009, including a ten-place gain by one crew. It was also the first time the boat club together fielded four crews in the May Bumps.

In October 2017 it was announced that the two college clubs were to separate.

With the help of benefactors Dame Veronica Sutherland and Dr Lindsay Traub the club was able to purchase a novice boat called Lady Charlotte, and an additional boat, Speedwell, was donated in 2013. A third boat, Lucky Lucy, was purchased also with Dr Traub's support in 2015.

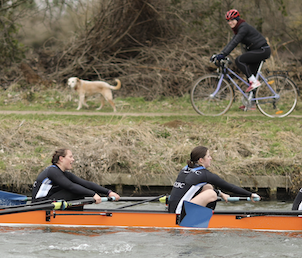
A Lucy Cavendish College Boat Club women's crew racing in Lucky Lyda.

Shortly after the separation from Hughes Hall Boat Club, a fundraising campaign led to the purchase of Lucky Lyda, the women's First boat. It is well known on the river due to its distinctive orange stripe. The club currently maintains four boats, which are housed both in the Emmanuel Boat Club boathouse and the St Catherine's Boat Club boathouse.

Lucy Cavendish College began accepting male students in October 2021, and the boat club founded its first ever men's crew that same year. Initially without a men's boat, the club began renting an eight from the Cambridge 99s town club.

In May Bumps 2022, the boat club fielded three crews for the first time as an independent club, including its first men's crew. Both M1 and W1 achieved blades that year, alongside W2 achieving three bumps and a row-over. The boat club also won the Pegasus Cup, which is awarded to the boat club with the largest cumulative advancement during the bumps racing. They are the only club to have won the Pegasus Cup more than three times, having previously won it when combined with Hughes Hall in 2007, 2009 and 2014. Following this success, the boat club received a donation of their first men's boat, Colonel Rennie, from Emmanuel College after their Master's recognition of the success of the inaugural men's crew.

== Honours ==
=== Boat Race representatives ===
The following rowers were part of the rowing club at the time of their participation in The Boat Race.

Men's boat race
Year	Name
2026	Kyle Fram
2026	Frederik Breuer

Women's boat race
Year	Name
2016	Myriam Goudet
2017	Myriam Goudet
2017	Melissa Wilson
2018	Myriam Goudet-Boukhatmi
2021	Anouschka Fenley
2021	Sarah Tisdall
2024	Megan Lee
