= Clare Hall Boat Club =

British rowing club

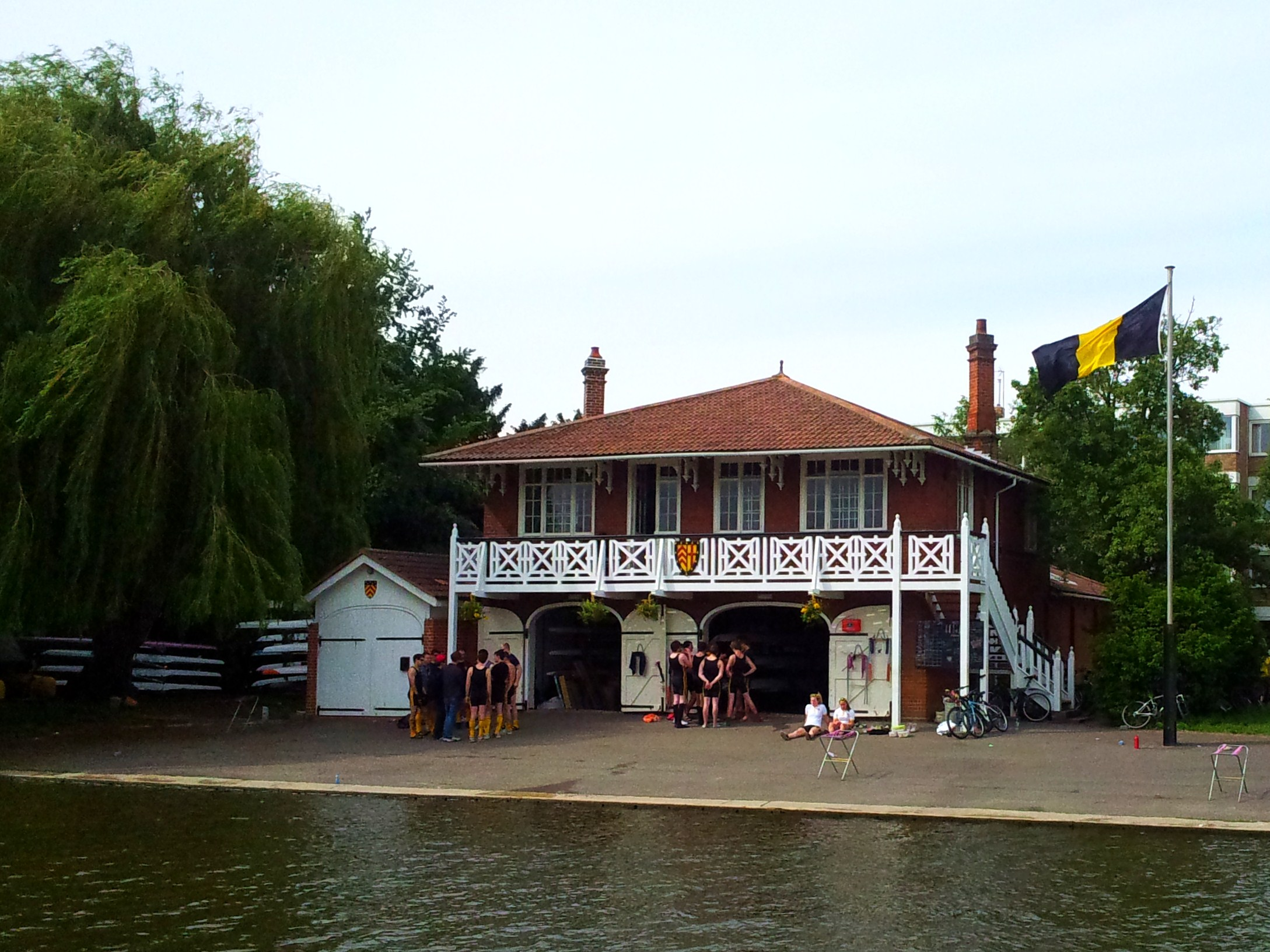

- Location: Cambridge, England
- Coordinates: 52°12′38.31″N 0°8′0.31″E
- Home water: River Cam
- Founded: 1995
- Membership: Clare Hall, Cambridge
- Affiliations: British Rowing CUCBC
- Website: Clare Hall Boat Club

Clare Hall Boat Club is the boat club for members of Clare Hall, Cambridge, a constituent college of the University of Cambridge. Clare Hall Boat Club is the youngest (founded 1995) and one of the smallest boat clubs in Cambridge. It shares the boat house with Clare and competes with one boat in the University bumps for the men's and a women's team respectively.

== History ==
Clare Hall won the Pegasus Cup in 2010 and 2019, awarded annually to the most successful college boat club at the May Bumps (measured by a points system based on how many places a club moves up the rankings). Despite being a young club, Clare Hall has achieved blades twelve times in the bumps races, the most recent being in 2024 for both the men's and women's teams.

== Honours ==
=== Boat Race representatives ===
The following rowers were part of the rowing club at the time of their participation in The Boat Race.

Year	Name
2008	Peter Marsland
