= Anglia Ruskin Boat Club =

British rowing club

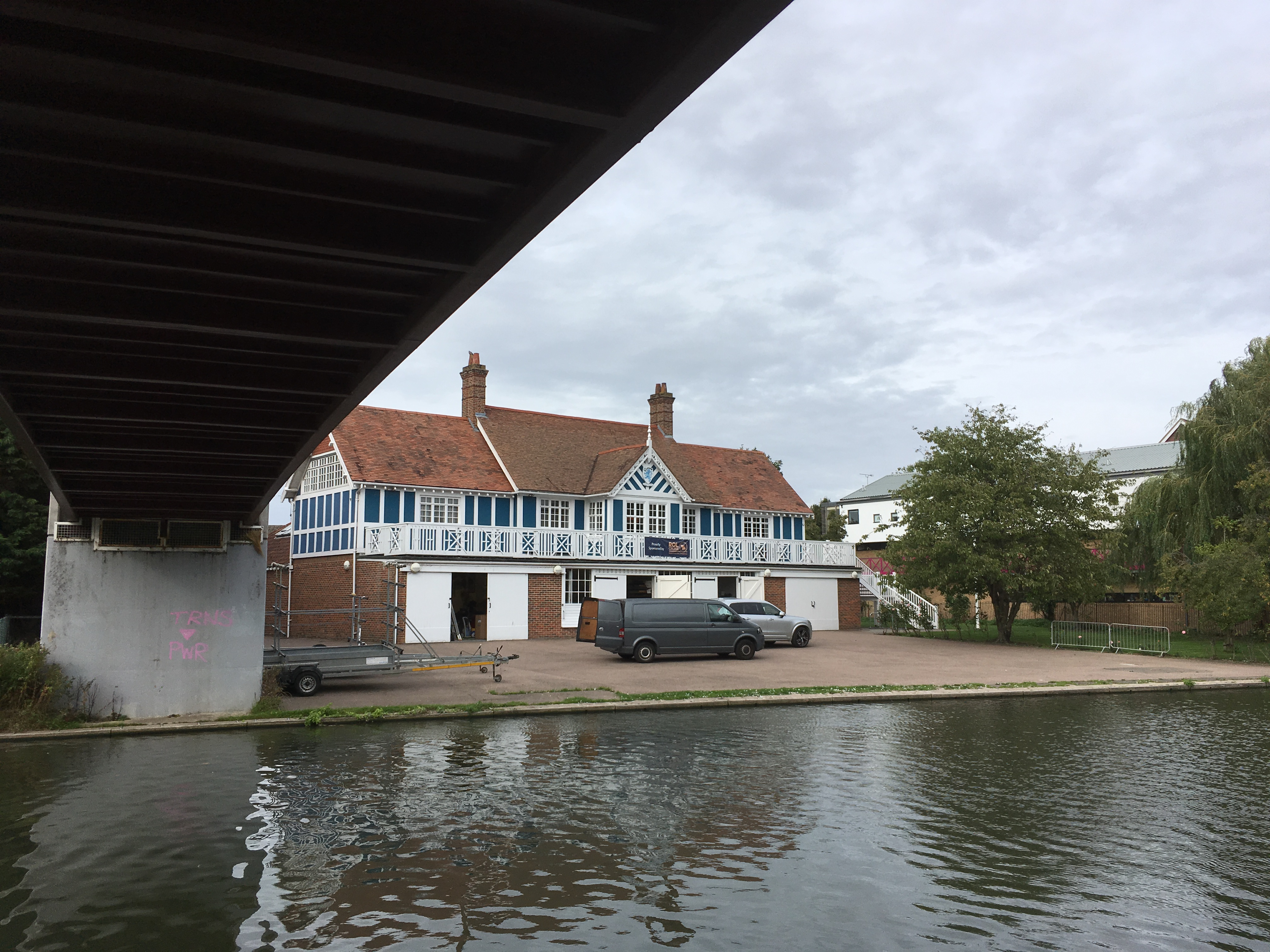

- Location: Cambridge, England
- Coordinates: 52°12′38.6″N 0°8′4.3″E
- Home water: River Cam
- Founded: 1980
- Former names: CCAT Boat Club
- Membership: Anglia Ruskin University
- Affiliations: British Rowing CUCBC
- Website: https://aru.ac.uk/sport/sports/rowing

Anglia Ruskin Boat Club (ARBC) is the rowing club for members of Anglia Ruskin University. It was known as CCAT Boat Club (usually said as sea cat) until 2008. The name CCAT derives from a former name for the university, the Cambridgeshire College of Arts and Technology, which is abbreviated to CCAT. The boat club kept the name CCAT much longer than its linked place of education – it was once thought the club would lose its positions in the bumps races if the name were changed, but that is urban legend (as is the notion that a club must retain 'college' in its name).

== History ==
Although not affiliated with Cambridge University, ARBC have rowed in the Lent and May Bumps since the 1980s as a guest club. CCAT first put a men's crew on in 1988 in both events, and rose quickly to lie in the middle of the 2nd division in both sets of bumps races, although recently have slipped into the lower half. The women first appeared in the May Bumps in 1983 and Lent Bumps in 1984, but have only had a continuous presence since 1987 in both events. ARBC 1st women rose to take a place in the bottom of the Lents 1st division in the late 1990s but have since faded to the bottom of the 2nd division. In the May Bumps, ARBC 1st women rose to get into the 1st division for two days in 2002 but have now also fallen to the bottom of the 2nd division. In the 2003 May bumps, the Ladies 2nd VIII won blades, by bumping an unprecedented 5 bumps (Jesus IV, Robinson II, Sidney Sussex II, Hughes Hall, Homerton II).

ARBC crews also participate in other races and regattas throughout the year; those off the Cam include Bedford, Peterborough, and London. Crews have had quite steady and notable successes, since 2006.

The 1st Women won the Novice 8+ in Bedford Regatta 2006. A similar line-up finished 97th out of 274 (including several from abroad) in the Women's (Eights) Head of the River Race that year.

The 1st Men and 1st Women won the Sunday Novice 8+ at Peterborough Regatta that year, plus ARBC women took second and third places. There, the next year, the club repeated these wins – in the lowest non-novice category (Senior 4) and the 2nd Women's eight won the Novice eights.

In 2014 the women's crew won Blades at the May Bumps, bumping Clare Hall, Fitzwilliam II, First & Third II and Newnham III.

In 2017 the men's crew won Blades at May Bumps.

== Gallery ==
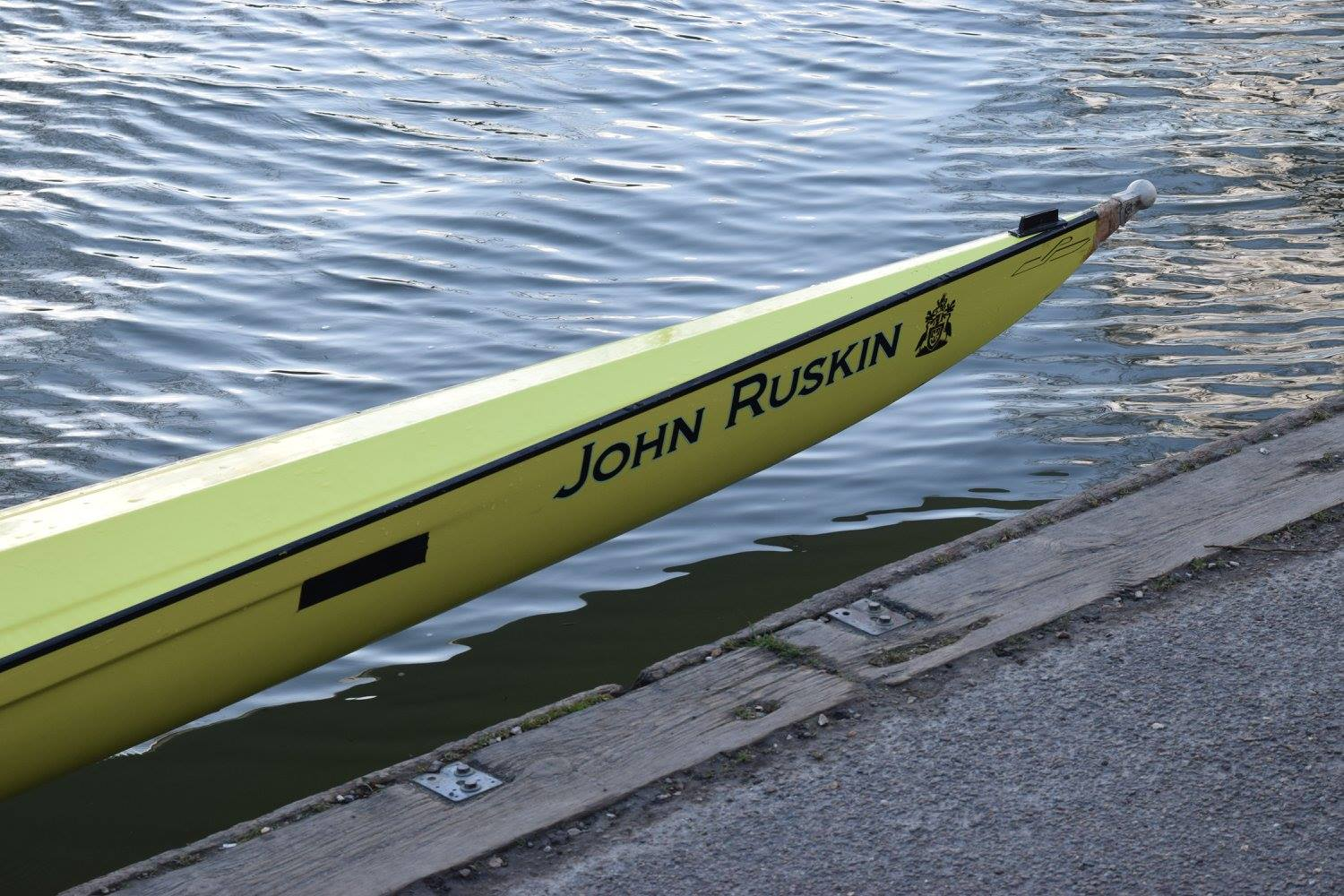
Rowing boat John Ruskin.

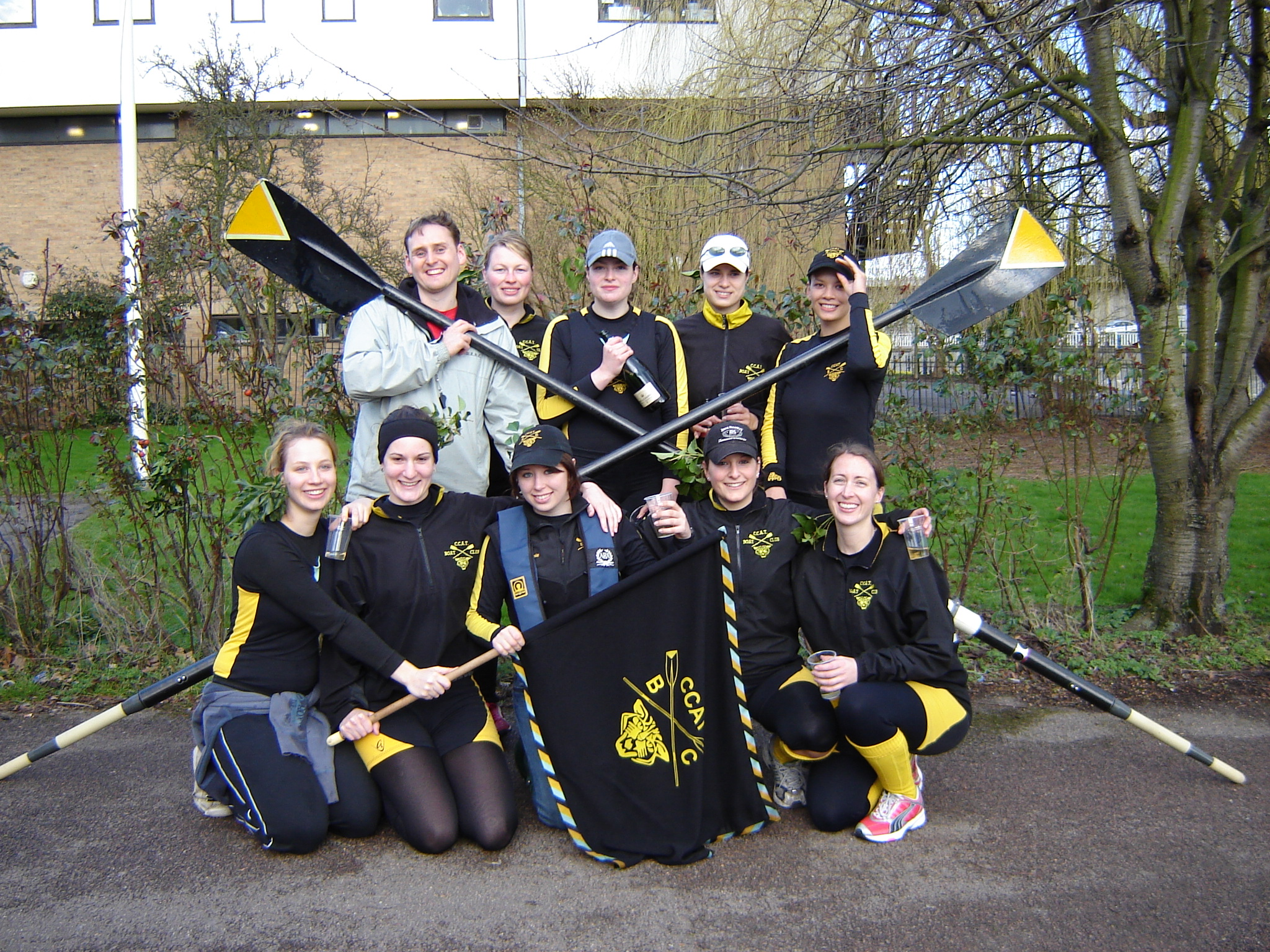
1st women's blades crew in 2007 & their coach

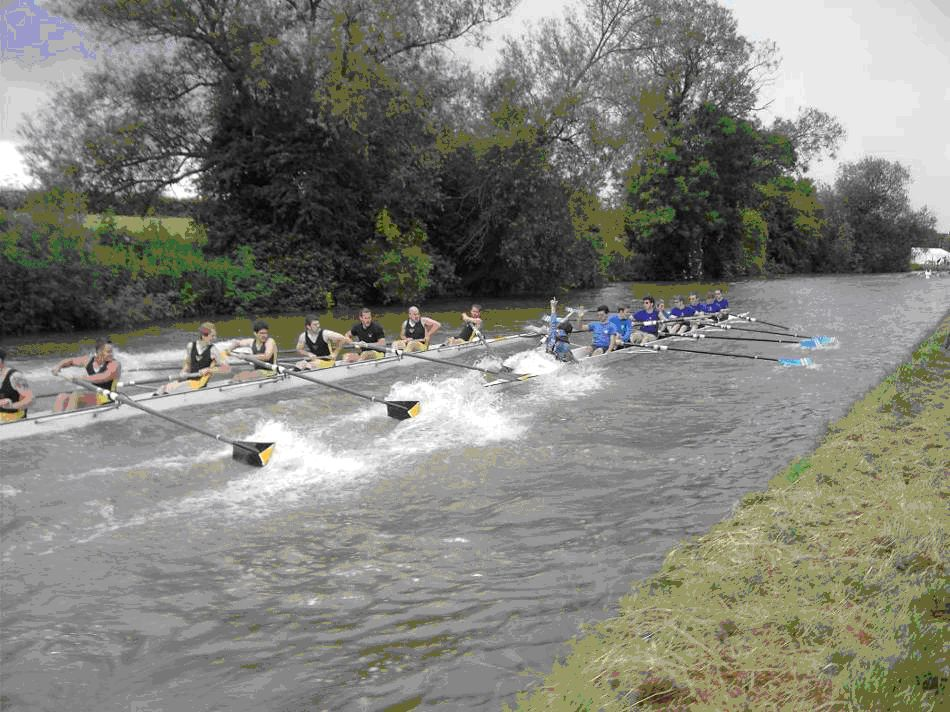
CCAT M2 Blade-winning bump on Robinson M3 in 2007

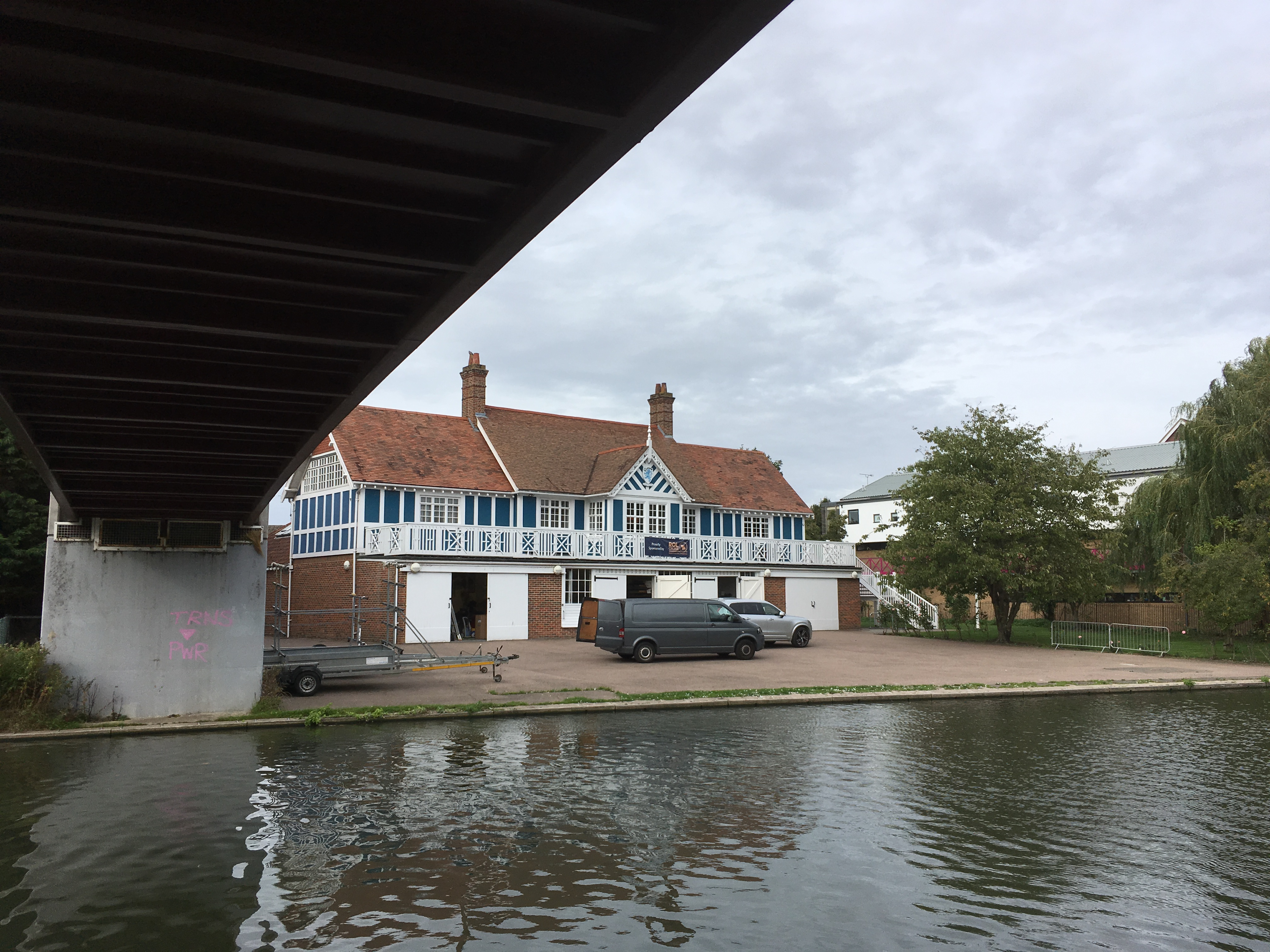
Anglia Ruskin Boat Club.

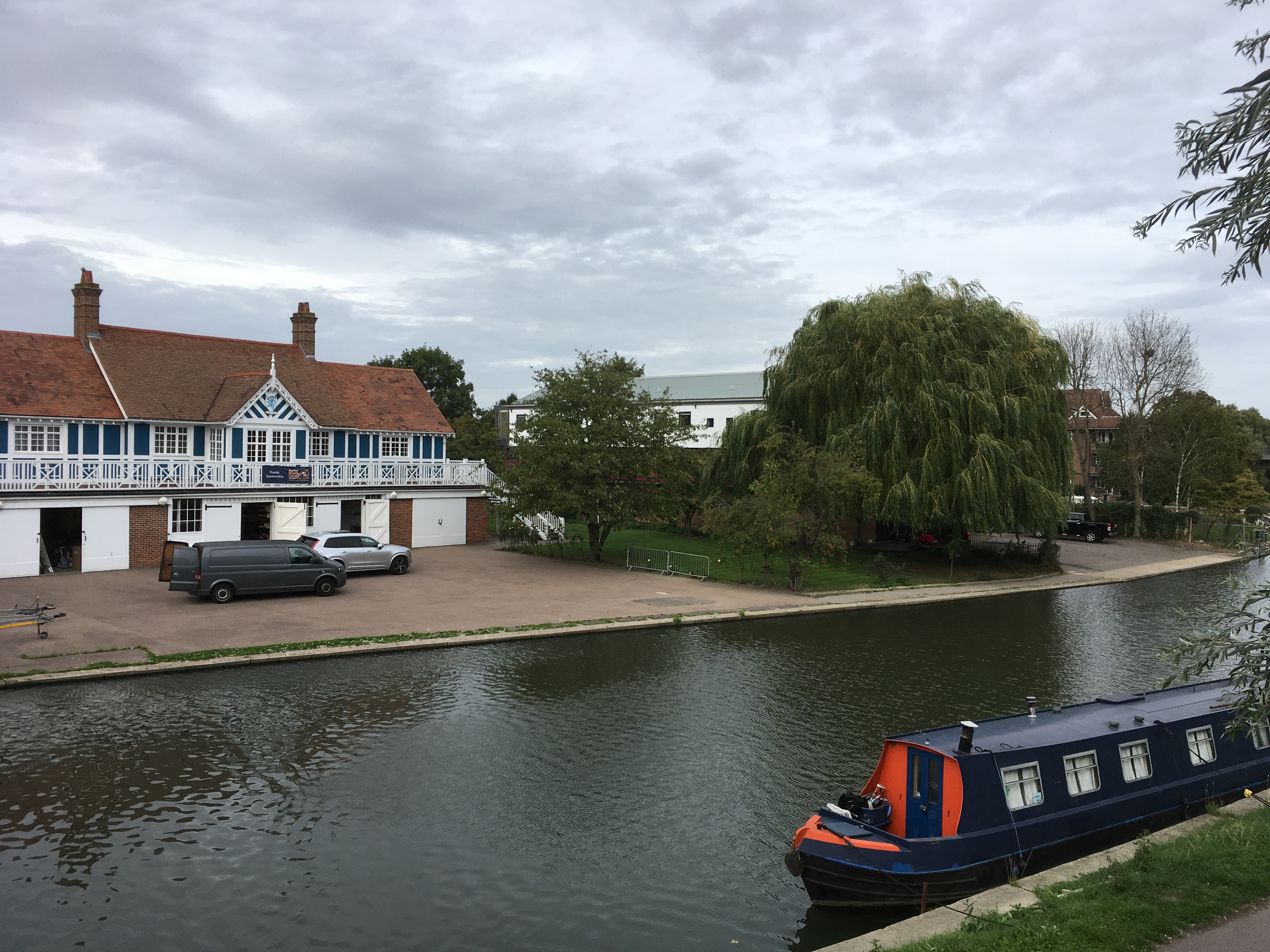
Anglia Ruskin Boat Club (ARBC).
