= Robinson College Boat Club =

British rowing club

- Location: Cambridge, England
- Coordinates: 52°12′48.5″N 0°7′34″E
- Home water: River Cam
- Founded: 1981
- Membership: Robinson College, Cambridge
- University: University of Cambridge
- Affiliations: British Rowing CUCBC
- Website: rcbc.soc.srcf.net

Events
- Robinson Head

Notable members
- John Pritchard

Robinson College Boat Club is the rowing club for members of Robinson College, Cambridge. Robinson is one of the newest colleges of Cambridge University and its men's and women's crews both appeared in 1981 for the first time.

== History ==
The men's 1st VIII rose steadily in the Lent Bumps, competing continuously in the 1st division from 1998 to 2008 and rising as high as 9th in 2001. After briefly dropping into the 2nd division in 2008, recent years have seen a resurgence, with blades in 2010, 2012 and 2015 moving Robinson up to 10th on the river in Lents. In the May Bumps, the men's 1st VIII was in the 1st division continuously from 1995 to 2008, finishing 4th on the river in 2003. Recent Mays results have been mixed, with a brief foray back into the 1st division in 2011 before an unlucky year in 2012 dropping the crew back into the 2nd division.

The women's 1st VIII have had a continuous existence in the Lents 2nd division since 1982, apart from a brief visit to the 1st division in 1992. In the May Bumps, the 1st women's IV dropped into the 3rd division by 1987 after being double-overbumped (dropping five places in a single day) on three occasions since 1982. Robinson's 1st women's VIII were positioned at the bottom of the 1st division following the reorganisation of the start order in 1990 when the May Bumps changed to eight-oared boats, and have spent most of the time since then in the top half of the 2nd division or the bottom few crews of the 1st, rising as high as 13th in 2000. Recent years have seen mixed results, with the crew currently 15th in the 2nd division in Lents, and 13th in the 2nd in Mays.

The Robinson lower boats have had varying degrees of success over the years - recent highlights include the 2nd Women's VIII earning blades in Mays 2010, and the 2nd Men's VIII repeating the feat in both 2011 and 2014.

== Honours ==
=== Boat Race representatives ===
The following rowers were part of the rowing club at the time of their participation in The Boat Race.

Year	Name
1984	Geoff A. D. Barnard
1984	John Pritchard
1985	Geoff A. D. Barnard
1985	John Pritchard
1986	John Pritchard
1987	Matt Brittin
1988	Matt Brittin

Year	Name
1989	Matt Brittin
1990	Stephen L. Fowler
1992	Stephen L. Fowler
1996	James F. E. Ball
1997	James F. E. Ball
2002	Ellie Griggs (cox)

== Notable alumni ==
John Pritchard represented Cambridge in the boat race and won silver in the Men's VIII at the 1980 Olympics.
