= May Bumps 2010 =

Rowing races at Cambridge University

The May Bumps 2010 were a set of rowing races held in Cambridge, UK with crews from the boat clubs of all Cambridge University Colleges, the University Medical and Veterinary Schools and Anglia Ruskin University from Wednesday 9 June 2010 to Saturday 12 June 2010. The event was run as a bumps race and was the 119th set of races in the series of May Bumps which have been held annually in mid-June in this form since 1887. In 2010, a total of 172 crews took part (103 men's crews and 69 women's crews), with nearly 1550 participants in total.

== Head of the River crews ==
1st & 3rd Trinity men's 1st VIII rowed over to retain their headship gained in 2008.

Pembroke women's 1st VIII also rowed over to retain their headship held from 2008.

This was the second year running that there was no change in either the men's or women's headship.

== Highest 2nd VIIIs ==
1st & 3rd Trinity II remained the highest men's 2nd VIII and their 15th position at the end of the week, bumping up on Churchill but being caught by a resurgent King's.

Pembroke II gained the highest women's 2nd VIII from Jesus II at the end of the week at 18th position, having started 20th.

== Pegasus Cup and the Biggest Risers ==
Clare Hall won the Pegasus cup for the first time. The club's two boats moved up seven places up the rankings with the women winning and the men narrowly missing out on blades.

Caius III rose a total of nine places, moving into Men's division 3, by bumping into the sandwich boat position on the final day before overbumping on Queens' III. In the women's competition, both Christ's II and Christ's III climbed seven places, each winning blades.

== Links to races in other years ==
Preceding year	Current year	Following year
May Bumps 2009	May Bumps 2010	May Bumps 2011
Lent Bumps 2009	Lent Bumps 2010	Lent Bumps 2011

== Bumps Charts ==
Below are the bumps charts all 6 men's and all 4 women's divisions, with the men's event on the left and women's event on the right. The bumps chart represents the progress of every crew over all four days of the racing. To follow the progress of any particular crew, simply find the crew's name on the left side of the chart and follow the line to the end-of-the-week finishing position on the right of the chart.

Note that this chart may not be displayed correctly if you are using a large font size on your browser. A simple way to check is to see that the first horizontal bold line, marking the boundary between divisions, lies between positions 17 and 18. The combined Hughes Hall/Lucy Cavendish women's crews are listed as Lucy Cavendish only.

Pos	Crew	Men's Bumps Chart	Crew	Pos	Crew	Women's Bumps Chart	Crew	Pos
1	1st & 3rd Trinity		1st & 3rd Trinity	1	Pembroke		Pembroke	1
2	Caius		Pembroke	2	Jesus		Downing	2
3	Jesus		Caius	3	Caius		Christ's	3
4	Lady Margaret		Jesus	4	Emmanuel		Emmanuel	4
5	Pembroke		Downing	5	Downing		Lady Margaret	5
6	Downing		Lady Margaret	6	Lady Margaret		Caius	6
7	Queens'		St. Catharine's	7	Christ's		Newnham	7
8	Trinity Hall		Queens'	8	Girton		Jesus	8
9	Clare		Fitzwilliam	9	1st & 3rd Trinity		1st & 3rd Trinity	9
10	St. Catharine's		Magdalene	10	Newnham		Clare	10
11	Fitzwilliam		Trinity Hall	11	Clare		Queens'	11
12	Magdalene		Emmanuel	12	Magdalene		Girton	12
13	Churchill		Clare	13	Queens'		St. Catharine's	13
14	Emmanuel		King's	14	Churchill		Trinity Hall	14
15	1st & 3rd Trinity II		1st & 3rd Trinity II	15	St. Catharine's		Magdalene	15
16	Christ's		Christ's	16	Trinity Hall		Churchill	16
17	King's		Churchill	17	Jesus II		King's	17
18	Robinson		Robinson	18	King's		Pembroke II	18
19	Lady Margaret II		Peterhouse	19	Peterhouse		Selwyn	19
20	Peterhouse		Selwyn	20	Pembroke II		Jesus II	20
21	Selwyn		Downing II	21	Selwyn		Peterhouse	21
22	Downing II		Lady Margaret II	22	Darwin		Robinson	22
23	Girton		Girton	23	Anglia Ruskin		Emmanuel II	23
24	Caius II		Homerton	24	Lady Margaret II		Anglia Ruskin	24
25	Darwin		Caius II	25	Robinson		Sidney Sussex	25
26	Jesus II		Selwyn	26	Homerton		Darwin	26
27	Anglia Ruskin		Jesus II	27	Emmanuel II		Murray Edwards	27
28	Homerton		Anglia Ruskin	28	Sidney Sussex		Lady Margaret II	28
29	Wolfson II		Darwin	29	Fitzwilliam		Fitzwilliam	29
30	St Edmund's		Sidney Sussex	30	Murray Edwards		Homerton	30
31	Queens' II		Wolfson	31	Downing II		Newnham II	31
32	Emmanuel II		Christ's II	32	Clare II		Clare II	32
33	Sidney Sussex		Queens' II	33	Corpus Christi		Downing II	33
34	Selwyn II		Pembroke II	34	Caius II		Lucy Cavendish	34
35	Corpus Christi		Emmanuel II	35	Newnham II		Corpus Christi	35
36	1st & 3rd Trinity III		Corpus Christi	36	Lucy Cavendish		Magdalene II	36
37	Christ's II		Clare II	37	Girton II		Queens' II	37
38	St. Catharine's II		Selwyn II	38	Magdalene II		Caius II	38
39	Pembroke II		Lady Margaret III	39	Wolfson		Trinity Hall II	39
40	Magdalene II		1st & 3rd Trinity III	40	1st & 3rd Trinity II		Girton II	40
41	Clare II		St. Catharine's II	41	Queens' II		Wolfson	41
42	Churchill II		Magdalene II	42	St Edmund's		Christ's II	42
43	Lady Margaret III		Hughes Hall	43	Trinity Hall II		1st & 3rd Trinity II	43
44	Fitzwilliam II		Fitzwilliam II	44	Pembroke III		Pembroke III	44
45	Peterhouse II		Peterhouse II	45	Jesus III		Emmanuel III	45
46	Hughes Hall		Churchill II	46	Emmanuel III		Selwyn II	46
47	Girton II		Robinson II	47	Selwyn II		St Edmund's	47
48	Trinity Hall II		Trinity Hall II	48	Christ's III		St. Catharine's II	48
49	Robinson II		Caius III	49	Darwin III		Jesus III	49
50	Jesus III		Emmanuel III	50	Anglia Ruskin II		Clare Hall	50
51	Queens' III		Girton II	51	St. Catharine's II		Anglia Ruskin II	51
52	Darwin II		Queens' III	52	Newnham III		Newnham III	52
53	Wolfson II		Wolfson II	53	Churchill II		Darwin II	53
54	Selwyn III		Darwin II	54	Clare Hall		Murray Edwards II	54
55	King's II		King's II	55	1st & 3rd Trinity III		Sidney Sussex II	55
56	Emmanuel III		Jesus III	56	Homerton II		Churchill II	56
57	Downing III		Pembroke III	57	Murray Edwards II		Robinson II	57
58	Caius III		Selwyn III	58	Fitzwilliam II		1st & 3rd Trinity III	58
59	St. Catharine's III		Clare Hall	59	Sidney Sussex II		Magdalene III	59
60	Pembroke III		Downing III	60	Sidney Sussex III		Homerton II	60
61	Clare III		1st & 3rd Trinity IV	61	Robinson II		Fitzwilliam II	61
62	Clare Hall		St. Catharine's III	62	Magdalene III		Christ's III	62
63	Trinity Hall III		Anglia Ruskin II	63	Queens' III		Queens' III	63
64	1st & 3rd Trinity IV		Clare III	64	Clare III		Sidney Sussex III	64
65	Anglia Ruskin II		Corpus Christi II	65	King's II		King's II	65
66	Lady Margaret IV		1st & 3rd Trinity III	66	Lucy Cavendish II		Lucy Cavendish II	66
67	Jesus IV		Lady Margaret IV	67	Trinity Hall III		Clare III	67
68	Corpus Christi II		Selwyn II	68	Christ's III		Peterhouse II	68
69	Sidney Sussex II		Christ's III	69	Peterhouse II		Trinity Hall III	69
70	Christ's III		Jesus IV					
71	1st & 3rd Trinity V		Magdalene III					
72	Christ's IV		Sidney Sussex II					
73	St Edmund's II		Christ's IV					
74	Magdalene III		1st & 3rd Trinity V					
75	Churchill III		Churchill III					
76	Homerton II		Homerton II					
77	Robinson III		Caius IV					
78	Jesus V		Pembroke IV					
79	Caius IV		Jesus V					
80	Sidney Sussex III		Hughes Hall II					
81	King's III		Robinson III					
82	Pembroke IV		Fitzwilliam III					
83	Lady Margaret V		Sidney Sussex III					
84	Hughes Hall II		Pembroke V					
85	Fitzwilliam III		King's III					
86	Lady Margaret VI		Lady Margaret V					
87	Pembroke V		Girton III					
88	Queens' IV		Lady Margaret VI					
89	Christ's V		Queens' IV					
90	Downing IV		Christ's V					
91	Girton III		Pembroke VI					
92	1st & 3rd Trinity VI		Downing IV					
93	Clare IV		1st & 3rd Trinity VI					
94	Girton IV		Girton IV					
95	Pembroke VI		Pembroke VII					
96	Downing V		Clare IV					
97	1st & 3rd Trinity VII		Emmanuel IV					
98	King's IV		1st & 3rd Trinity VII					
99	Pembroke VII		Magdalene IV					
100	Clare V		Downing V					
101	Emmanuel IV		King's IV					
102	Magdalene IV		Clare V					
103	Girton V		Girton V					

== The Getting-on Race ==
The Getting-on Race (GoR) allows a number of crews which did not already have a place from last year's races to compete for the right to race this year. Up to ten crews are removed from the bottom of last year's finishing order, who must then race alongside new entrants to decide which crews gain a place (with one bumps place per 3 crews competing, subject to the maximum of 10 available places).

The 2010 May Bumps Getting-on Race took place on 4 June 2010.

=== Competing crews ===
==== Men ====
16 men's crews raced for 10 available spaces at the bottom of the 6th division. The following were successful and rowed in the bumps.

- Clare IV
- Girton IV
- Pembroke VI
- Downing IV
- 1st & 3rd Trinity VII
- King's VI
- Pembroke VII
- Clare V
- Emmanuel IV
- Magdalene IV

The following were unsuccessful.

- Girton V
- Wolfson III
- Hughes Hall III
- Caius III
- Corpus Christi III

The following did not race.

- Selwyn IV

==== Women ====
9 women's crews raced for 4 available spaces at the bottom of the 4th division. The following were successful and rowed in the bumps.

- Hughes Hall II/*Lucy Cavendish II
- Trinity Hall III
- Christ's III
- Peterhouse II

The following were unsuccessful.

- Murray Edwards III
- Clare Hall II
- Girton III
- Corpus Christi II

The following did not race.

- St. Catharine's III
