= May Bumps 2007 =

Rowing races at Cambridge University

The May Bumps 2007 were a set of rowing races held at Cambridge University from Wednesday, 13 June 2007 to Saturday, 16 June 2007. The races were run as a bumps race and were the 116th set of races in the series of May Bumps which have been held annually in mid-June in this form since 1887. In 2007, a total of 168 crews took part (93 men's crews and 75 women's crews), with around 1500 participants in total.

== Head of the River crews ==
Caius men started from head station, and rowed-over to retain the headship for the 9th time since 1998, and 6th consecutive year.

Jesus women bumped Pembroke on the first day regain the headship they lost in 2006.

== Highest 2nd VIIIs ==
1st & 3rd Trinity II bumped Caius II on the 1st day to regain the highest 2nd VIII place that they lost in 2006.

Jesus II were the highest 2nd women's VIII at the start of the week, and managed to get into the first division - the first time that any women's 2nd VIII has achieved this since the women's Mays were rowed in eights in 1990.

== Links to races in other years ==
Preceding year	Current year	Following year
May Bumps 2006	May Bumps 2007	May Bumps 2008
Lent Bumps 2006	Lent Bumps 2007	Lent Bumps 2008

== Bumps Charts ==
Below are the bumps charts all 6 men's and all 5 women's divisions, with the men's event on the left and women's event on the right. The bumps chart represents the progress of every crew over all four days of the racing. To follow the progress of any particular crew, simply find the crew's name on the left side of the chart and follow the line to the end-of-the-week finishing position on the right of the chart.

Note that this chart may not be displayed correctly if you are using a large font size on your browser. A simple way to check is to see that the first horizontal bold line, marking the boundary between divisions, lies between positions 17 and 18.

Pos	Crew	Men's Bumps Chart	Crew	Pos	Crew	Women's Bumps Chart	Crew	Pos
1	Caius		Caius	1	Pembroke		Jesus	1
2	St. Catharine's		1st & 3rd Trinity	2	Jesus		Pembroke	2
3	Lady Margaret		Lady Margaret	3	Emmanuel		Emmanuel	3
4	Queens'		Trinity Hall	4	Caius		Newnham	4
5	1st & 3rd Trinity		Jesus	5	Trinity Hall		Caius	5
6	Churchill		St. Catharine's	6	Girton		Girton	6
7	Trinity Hall		Churchill	7	Newnham		1st & 3rd Trinity	7
8	Jesus		Queens'	8	Clare		Trinity Hall	8
9	Downing		Downing	9	Downing		Lady Margaret	9
10	Pembroke		Emmanuel	10	Lady Margaret		Clare	10
11	Emmanuel		Pembroke	11	Churchill		Downing	11
12	Christ's		Clare	12	1st & 3rd Trinity		Queens'	12
13	Robinson		Robinson	13	Magdalene		Churchill	13
14	Clare		1st & 3rd Trinity II	14	King's		Christ's	14
15	Magdalene		Christ's	15	Christ's		St. Catharine's	15
16	Caius II		Fitzwilliam	16	Queens'		Jesus II	16
17	1st & 3rd Trinity II		Magdalene	17	Selwyn		King's	17
18	Wolfson		Caius II	18	St. Catharine's		Peterhouse	18
19	Selwyn		Selwyn	19	Jesus II		Magdalene	19
20	Fitzwilliam		King's	20	New Hall		CCAT	20
21	Peterhouse		Wolfson	21	Darwin		Selwyn	21
22	Downing II		Lady Margaret II	22	Peterhouse		Fitzwilliam	22
23	King's		Peterhouse	23	CCAT		Darwin	23
24	Lady Margaret II		Downing II	24	Fitzwilliam		Pembroke II	24
25	CCAT		CCAT	25	Lady Margaret II		New Hall	25
26	Jesus II		Emmanuel II	26	Emmanuel II		Emmanuel II	26
27	St. Catharine's II		Jesus II	27	Caius II		Lady Margaret II	27
28	Corpus Christi		Corpus Christi	28	Pembroke II		Robinson	28
29	Sidney Sussex		Girton	29	Newnham II		Homerton	29
30	Emmanuel II		Darwin	30	Wolfson		Girton II	30
31	Girton		St. Catharine's II	31	Robinson		Caius II	31
32	Darwin		St Edmund's	32	Homerton		Sidney Sussex	32
33	Queens' II		Sidney Sussex	33	Sidney Sussex		Wolfson	33
34	Selwyn II		Homerton	34	Girton II		Downing II	34
35	Churchill II		Queens' II	35	Clare II		Newnham II	35
36	Robinson II		Churchill II	36	Queens' II		Corpus Christi	36
37	Magdalene II		Pembroke II	37	Trinity Hall II		Queens' II	37
38	Homerton		Selwyn II	38	Downing II		Jesus III	38
39	St Edmund's		Girton II	39	Jesus III		Clare II	39
40	Girton II		1st & 3rd Trinity III	40	Corpus Christi		1st & 3rd Trinity II	40
41	Pembroke II		Robinson II	41	St. Catharine's II		Trinity Hall II	41
42	Trinity Hall II		Magdalene II	42	Darwin II		Magdalene II	42
43	1st & 3rd Trinity III		Fitzwilliam II	43	Lady Margaret III		Darwin II	43
44	Christ's II		Christ's II	44	1st & 3rd Trinity II		Lucy Cavendish	44
45	Lady Margaret III		Clare II	45	New Hall II		St. Catharine's II	45
46	Clare II		Trinity Hall II	46	Magdalene II		CCAT II	46
47	Fitzwilliam II		Jesus III	47	Churchill II		Lady Margaret III	47
48	Emmanuel III		Lady Margaret III	48	Lucy Cavendish		Vet School	48
49	Peterhouse II		Emmanuel III	49	CCAT II		New Hall II	49
50	Jesus III		Hughes Hall	50	Vet School		Churchill II	50
51	Downing III		Darwin II	51	Newnham III		St Edmund's	51
52	Darwin II		Peterhouse II	52	Selwyn II		Selwyn II	52
53	St. Catharine's III		St. Catharine's III	53	Homerton II		1st & 3rd Trinity III	53
54	Hughes Hall		Queens' III	54	Addenbrooke's		Pembroke III	54
55	Caius III		Downing III	55	St Edmund's		Newnham III	55
56	Trinity Hall III		Clare III	56	1st & 3rd Trinity III		Emmanuel III	56
57	Clare III		Trinity Hall III	57	Pembroke III		Homerton II	57
58	Queens' III		Selwyn III	58	Caius III		Christ's II	58
59	Selwyn III		Caius III	59	Queens' III		Addenbrooke's	59
60	Lady Margaret IV		Corpus Christi II	60	Christ's II		New Hall III	60
61	Corpus Christi II		Wolfson II	61	Robinson II		Caius III	61
62	1st & 3rd Trinity IV		1st & 3rd Trinity IV	62	Emmanuel III		Queens' III	62
63	Pembroke III		King's II	63	New Hall III		Emmanuel IV	63
64	Jesus IV		Lady Margaret IV	64	Emmanuel IV		Robinson II	64
65	Churchill III		Pembroke III	65	Newnham IV		Pembroke IV	65
66	Wolfson II		Churchill III	66	Fitzwilliam II		Fitzwilliam II	66
67	Sidney Sussex II		Jesus IV	67	Girton III		Newnham IV	67
68	1st & 3rd Trinity V		Clare Hall	68	King's II		CCAT III	68
69	King's II		Christ's IV	69	CCAT III		Girton III	69
70	Christ's III		Sidney Sussex II	70	Pembroke IV		Magdalene III	70
71	Christ's IV		Caius V	71	Corpus Christi II		King's II	71
72	Magdalene III		1st & 3rd Trinity IV	72	Girton IV		Downing III	72
73	Robinson III		Magdalene III	73	Downing III		Corpus Christi II	73
74	Caius IV		Christ's III	74	Magdalene III		Sidney Sussex II	74
75	Clare Hall		CCAT II	75	Sidney Sussex II		Girton IV	75
76	Fitzwilliam III		Robinson III	76				
77	Lady Margaret V		Jesus VI	77				
78	Jesus V		Lady Margaret V	78				
79	CCAT II		Peterhouse III	79				
80	Sidney Sussex III		Fitzwilliam III	80				
81	St Edmund's II		Jesus V	81				
82	Peterhouse III		Pembroke IV	82				
83	Jesus VI		Homerton II	83				
84	Lady Margaret VI		St Edmund's II	84				
85	Homerton II		Queens' IV	85				
86	Emmanuel IV		Sidney Sussex III	86				
87	Queens' IV		Lady Margaret VI	87				
88	Selwyn IV		Selwyn IV	88				
89	Pembroke IV		Girton III	89				
90	Girton III		Emmanuel IV	90				
91	CCAT III		CCAT III	91				
92	Darwin III		Darwin III	92				
93	Churchill IV		Churchill IV	93				

- Addenbrooke's men were meant to start at 78th, but were sent home without rowing for incompetence.

== The Getting-on Race ==
The Getting-on Race (GoR) allows a number of crews which did not already have a place from last year's races to compete for the right to race this year. Up to ten crews are removed from the bottom of last year's finishing order, who must then race alongside new entrants to decide which crews gain a place (with one bumps place per 3 crews competing, subject to the maximum of 10 available places).

The 2007 May Bumps Getting-on Race took place on 8 June 2007.

=== Successful crews ===
The successful crews, which competed in the bumps, are (displayed in alphabetical order);

==== Men ====
- CCAT III
- Churchill IV
- Darwin III
- Girton III
- Pembroke IV
- Selwyn IV

==== Women ====
- Downing III
- Girton IV
- Magdalene III
- Sidney Sussex II
