= May Bumps 1998 =

Rowing races at Cambridge University

The May Bumps 1998 were a set of rowing races held at Cambridge University from Wednesday 10 June 1998 to Saturday 13 June 1998. The event was run as a bumps race and was the 107th set of races in the series of May Bumps that have been held annually in mid-June since 1887. In 1998, a total of 172 crews took part (103 men's crews and 69 women's crews), with around 1550 participants in total.

== Head of the River crews ==
Caius men bumped Downing to take their first headship since 1987.

Pembroke women rowed-over in 1st position, achieving the headship for the 2nd consecutive year.

== Highest 2nd VIIIs ==
The highest men's 2nd VIII for the 9th consecutive year was Lady Margaret II.

The highest women's 2nd VIII for the 5th consecutive year was Jesus II.

== Links to races in other years ==
Preceding year	Current year	Following year
May Bumps 1997	May Bumps 1998	May Bumps 1999
Lent Bumps 1997	Lent Bumps 1998	Lent Bumps 1999

== Bumps Charts ==
Below are the bumps charts for all divisions. The men's bumps charts are on the left, and women's bumps charts on the right. The bumps chart represents the progress of every crew over all four days of the racing. To follow the progress of any particular crew, simply find the crew's name on the left side of the chart and follow the line to the end-of-the-week finishing position on the right of the chart.

Pos	Crew	Men's Bumps Chart	Crew	Pos	Crew	Women's Bumps Chart	Crew	Pos
1	Downing		Caius	1	Pembroke		Pembroke	1
2	Caius		Jesus	2	Emmanuel		Emmanuel	2
3	Jesus		1st & 3rd Trinity	3	Jesus		Lady Margaret	3
4	Queens'		Downing	4	Clare		Jesus	4
5	Trinity Hall		Lady Margaret	5	Trinity Hall		Newnham	5
6	1st & 3rd Trinity		Queens'	6	Churchill		Clare	6
7	Magdalene		Pembroke	7	Lady Margaret		Caius	7
8	Robinson		Trinity Hall	8	Queens'		Trinity Hall	8
9	Lady Margaret		Emmanuel	9	Newnham		Queens'	9
10	Churchill		Magdalene	10	Downing		Churchill	10
11	Pembroke		Churchill	11	Caius		Downing	11
12	Christ's		Robinson	12	Homerton		Homerton	12
13	Emmanuel		Fitzwilliam	13	St. Catharine's		Selwyn	13
14	Sidney Sussex		Christ's	14	New Hall		Christ's	14
15	Peterhouse		St. Catharine's	15	Christ's		Magdalene	15
16	Fitzwilliam		Sidney Sussex	16	Sidney Sussex		St. Catharine's	16
17	Lady Margaret II		Peterhouse	17	Selwyn		Robinson	17
18	Clare		Clare	18	Magdalene		New Hall	18
19	Selwyn		Lady Margaret II	19	1st & 3rd Trinity		1st & 3rd Trinity	19
20	St. Catharine's		1st & 3rd Trinity II	20	Corpus Christi		Sidney Sussex	20
21	Downing II		Downing II	21	Robinson		Fitzwilliam	21
22	Girton		Queens' II	22	Jesus II		Peterhouse	22
23	1st & 3rd Trinity II		Selwyn	23	Fitzwilliam		Corpus Christi	23
24	Queens' II		Caius II	24	Girton		CCAT	24
25	King's		Girton	25	King's		Jesus II	25
26	Corpus Christi		King's	26	Peterhouse		Girton	26
27	Jesus II		Trinity Hall II	27	Lady Margaret II		Emmanuel II	27
28	Caius II		Churchill II	28	CCAT		King's	28
29	Trinity Hall II		Corpus Christi	29	Emmanuel II		Newnham II	29
30	Pembroke II		Emmanuel II	30	Newnham II		Darwin	30
31	Clare II		Jesus II	31	New Hall II		Lady Margaret II	31
32	Churchill II		Christ's II	32	Queens' II		New Hall II	32
33	Emmanuel II		Pembroke II	33	Homerton II		Clare II	33
34	St. Catharine's II		Wolfson	34	Trinity Hall II		Trinity Hall II	34
35	Christ's II		Clare II	35	Clare II		Homerton II	35
36	Fitzwilliam II		St. Catharine's II	36	Wolfson		Queens' II	36
37	Wolfson		Fitzwilliam II	37	Addenbrooke's		Churchill II	37
38	Lady Margaret III		1st & 3rd Trinity III	38	Jesus III		Jesus III	38
39	1st & 3rd Trinity III		Lady Margaret III	39	Darwin		Pembroke II	39
40	Magdalene II		Selwyn II	40	Magdalene II		Wolfson	40
41	Girton II		CCAT	41	Pembroke II		Addenbrooke's	41
42	Selwyn II		Girton II	42	St. Catharine's II		St. Catharine's II	42
43	Peterhouse II		Magdalene II	43	Churchill II		Magdalene II	43
44	Jesus III		Robinson II	44	1st & 3rd Trinity II		1st & 3rd Trinity II	44
45	CCAT		Peterhouse II	45	CCAT II		Caius II	45
46	Downing III		Darwin	46	Girton II		Girton II	46
47	Sidney Sussex II		Jesus III	47	Lady Margaret III		CCAT II	47
48	Robinson II		Lady Margaret IV	48	1st & 3rd Trinity III		Lady Margaret III	48
49	Corpus Christi II		Downing III	49	Caius II		Jesus IV	49
50	Darwin		Corpus Christi II	50	Fitzwilliam II		Fitzwilliam II	50
51	Trinity Hall III		Sidney Sussex II	51	Clare Hall		Downing II	51
52	Queens' III		St Edmund's	52	Jesus IV		1st & 3rd Trinity III	52
53	Lady Margaret IV		Queens' III	53	Christ's II		Robinson II	53
54	Hughes Hall		Hughes Hall	54	Robinson II		Homerton III	54
55	Churchill III		Trinity Hall III	55	Sidney Sussex II		Clare Hall	55
56	Pembroke III		Churchill III	56	Downing II		Selwyn II	56
57	Clare III		Clare III	57	Clare III		Christ's II	57
58	St Edmund's		Jesus IV	58	Selwyn II		Darwin II	58
59	Jesus IV		King's II	59	Homerton III		Clare III	59
60	1st & 3rd Trinity IV		Pembroke III	60	Darwin II		Caius III	60
61	Downing IV		1st & 3rd Trinity IV	61	Corpus Christi II		Sidney Sussex II	61
62	King's II		Lady Margaret V	62	New Hall III		New Hall III	62
63	Selwyn III		St. Catharine's III	63	St. Catharine's III		St. Catharine's III	63
64	Emmanuel III		Downing IV	64	Caius III		King's II	64
65	Lady Margaret V		Homerton	65	Magdalene III		Corpus Christi II	65
66	St. Catharine's III		Christ's III	66	Emmanuel III		Newnham III	66
67	Christ's III		Selwyn III	67	King's II		Darwin III	67
68	Clare IV		Emmanuel III	68	Darwin III		Magdalene III	68
69	Homerton		1st & 3rd Trinity V	69	Newnham III		Emmanuel III	69
70	Jesus V		Clare IV	70				
71	Girton III		CCAT II	71				
72	Churchill IV		Girton III	72				
73	CCAT II		Fitzwilliam III	73				
74	Trinity Hall IV		Jesus V	74				
75	1st & 3rd Trinity V		Churchill IV	75				
76	Addenbrooke's		Trinity Hall IV	76				
77	Fitzwilliam III		Darwin II	77				
78	King's III		Addenbrooke's	78				
79	Wolfson II		Clare Hall	79				
80	Queens' IV		1st & 3rd Trinity VI	80				
81	1st & 3rd Trinity VI		King's III	81				
82	Clare Hall		Caius III	82				
83	Corpus Christi III		Queens' IV	83				
84	Darwin II		Selwyn IV	84				
85	Selwyn IV		Wolfson II	85				
86	St. Catharine's IV		Corpus Christi III	86				
87	Caius III		Lady Margaret VI	87				
88	Lady Margaret VI		Homerton II	88				
89	Homerton II		St. Catharine's IV	89				
90	Clare V		Darwin III	90				
91	Girton IV		1st & 3rd Trinity VII	91				
92	1st & 3rd Trinity VII		1st & 3rd Trinity VIII	92				
93	St Edmund's II		Clare V	93				
94	Darwin III		Vet School	94				
95	Jesus VI		Girton IV	95				
96	1st & 3rd Trinity VIII		Jesus VI	96				
97	Vet School		St Edmund's II	97				
98	Emmanuel IV		Jesus VII	98				
99	1st & 3rd Trinity IX		Emmanuel IV	99				
100	Robinson III		1st & 3rd Trinity IX	100				
101	Jesus VII		Robinson III	101				
102	Caius IV		Caius IV	102				
103	Caius V		Caius V	103				
