= May Bumps 1997 =

Rowing races at Cambridge University

The May Bumps 1997 were a set of rowing races held at Cambridge University from Wednesday 11 June 1997 to Saturday 14 June 1997. The event was run as a bumps race and was the 106th set of races in the series of May Bumps which have been held annually in mid-June since 1887. In 1997, a total of 172 crews took part (103 men's crews and 69 women's crews), with around 1550 participants in total.

== Head of the River crews ==
Downing rowed over to retain the headship.

Pembroke bumped Emmanuel on the first day to take the Mays headship for the first time.

== Highest 2nd VIIIs ==
The highest men's 2nd VIII for the 8th consecutive year was Lady Margaret II, who bumped into Division 1.

The highest women's 2nd VIII for the 4th consecutive year was Jesus II.

== Links to races in other years ==
Preceding year	Current year	Following year
May Bumps 1996	May Bumps 1997	May Bumps 1998
Lent Bumps 1996	Lent Bumps 1997	Lent Bumps 1998

== Bumps Charts ==
Below are the bumps charts for all divisions. The men's bumps charts are on the left, and women's bumps charts on the right. The bumps chart represents the progress of every crew over all four days of the racing. To follow the progress of any particular crew, simply find the crew's name on the left side of the chart and follow the line to the end-of-the-week finishing position on the right of the chart.

Pos	Crew	Men's Bumps Chart	Crew	Pos	Crew	Women's Bumps Chart	Crew	Pos
1	Downing		Downing	1	Emmanuel		Pembroke	1
2	Trinity Hall		Caius	2	Pembroke		Emmanuel	2
3	Magdalene		Jesus	3	Jesus		Jesus	3
4	Jesus		Queens'	4	Trinity Hall		Clare	4
5	Lady Margaret		Trinity Hall	5	Newnham		Trinity Hall	5
6	Caius		1st & 3rd Trinity	6	Clare		Churchill	6
7	Churchill		Magdalene	7	Churchill		Lady Margaret	7
8	Queens'		Robinson	8	Homerton		Queens'	8
9	Emmanuel		Lady Margaret	9	Lady Margaret		Newnham	9
10	1st & 3rd Trinity		Churchill	10	New Hall		Downing	10
11	Pembroke		Pembroke	11	Queens'		Caius	11
12	Robinson		Christ's	12	Downing		Homerton	12
13	Christ's		Emmanuel	13	Caius		St. Catharine's	13
14	Clare		Sidney Sussex	14	Sidney Sussex		New Hall	14
15	Sidney Sussex		Peterhouse	15	Magdalene		Christ's	15
16	Fitzwilliam		Fitzwilliam	16	St. Catharine's		Sidney Sussex	16
17	St. Catharine's		Lady Margaret II	17	Christ's		Selwyn	17
18	Peterhouse		Clare	18	Selwyn		Magdalene	18
19	Selwyn		Selwyn	19	Corpus Christi		1st & 3rd Trinity	19
20	Lady Margaret II		St. Catharine's	20	Jesus II		Corpus Christi	20
21	Downing II		Downing II	21	Girton		Robinson	21
22	Girton		Girton	22	Peterhouse		Jesus II	22
23	Corpus Christi		1st & 3rd Trinity II	23	1st & 3rd Trinity		Fitzwilliam	23
24	Jesus II		Queens' II	24	Lady Margaret II		Girton	24
25	Queens' II		King's	25	Robinson		King's	25
26	King's		Corpus Christi	26	Emmanuel II		Peterhouse	26
27	1st & 3rd Trinity II		Jesus II	27	Fitzwilliam		Lady Margaret II	27
28	Pembroke II		Caius II	28	King's		CCAT	28
29	Emmanuel II		Trinity Hall II	29	CCAT		Emmanuel II	29
30	Trinity Hall II		Pembroke II	30	Newnham II		Newnham II	30
31	Caius II		Clare II	31	New Hall II		New Hall II	31
32	Fitzwilliam II		Churchill II	32	Homerton II		Queens' II	32
33	Clare II		Emmanuel II	33	Addenbrooke's		Homerton II	33
34	Churchill II		St. Catharine's II	34	Clare II		Clare II	34
35	St. Catharine's II		Christ's II	35	Jesus III		Trinity Hall II	35
36	Magdalene II		Fitzwilliam II	36	Queens' II		Wolfson	36
37	Christ's II		Wolfson	37	Trinity Hall II		Addenbrooke's	37
38	Selwyn II		Lady Margaret III	38	Magdalene II		Jesus III	38
39	Lady Margaret III		1st & 3rd Trinity III	39	Wolfson		Darwin	39
40	Jesus III		Magdalene II	40	1st & 3rd Trinity II		Magdalene II	40
41	Wolfson		Girton II	41	Pembroke II		Pembroke II	41
42	1st & 3rd Trinity III		Selwyn II	42	Darwin		St. Catharine's II	42
43	Sidney Sussex II		Peterhouse II	43	St. Catharine's II		Churchill II	43
44	Girton II		Jesus III	44	Girton II		1st & 3rd Trinity II	44
45	Peterhouse II		CCAT	45	Lady Margaret III		CCAT II	45
46	Corpus Christi II		Downing III	46	Churchill II		Girton II	46
47	CCAT		Sidney Sussex II	47	Jesus IV		Lady Margaret III	47
48	Trinity Hall III		Robinson II	48	CCAT II		1st & 3rd Trinity III	48
49	Lady Margaret IV		Corpus Christi II	49	Christ's II		Caius II	49
50	Downing III		Darwin	50	Caius II		Fitzwilliam II	50
51	Queens' III		Trinity Hall III	51	Sidney Sussex II		Jesus IV	51
52	Robinson II		Queens' III	52	1st & 3rd Trinity III		Christ's II	52
53	Churchill III		Lady Margaret IV	53	Clare III		Robinson II	53
54	Clare III		Hughes Hall	54	Fitzwilliam II		Sidney Sussex II	54
55	Darwin		Churchill III	55	Hughes Hall		Downing II	55
56	Pembroke III		Pembroke III	56	Robinson II		Clare III	56
57	Magdalene III		Clare III	57	Homerton III		Hughes Hall	57
58	Hughes Hall		St Edmund's	58	CCAT III		Selwyn II	58
59	Sidney Sussex III		Magdalene III	59	Downing II		Homerton III	59
60	Jesus IV		Jesus IV	60	Selwyn II		Darwin II	60
61	King's II		1st & 3rd Trinity IV	61	Queens' III		CCAT III	61
62	St Edmund's		Sidney Sussex III	62	Homerton IV		Churchill III	62
63	Lady Margaret V		Downing IV	63	Darwin II		Queens' III	63
64	St. Catharine's III		King's II	64	Corpus Christi II		Homerton IV	64
65	Emmanuel III		Selwyn III	65	Churchill III		Corpus Christi II	65
66	Clare IV		Emmanuel III	66	New Hall III		New Hall III	66
67	1st & 3rd Trinity IV		Lady Margaret V	67	St. Catharine's III		St. Catharine's III	67
68	Downing IV		St. Catharine's III	68	Newnham III		Newnham III	68
69	Selwyn III		Christ's III	69	Lady Margaret IV		Lady Margaret IV	69
70	Churchill IV		Clare IV	70				
71	Jesus V		Homerton	71				
72	Trinity Hall IV		Jesus V	72				
73	Christ's III		Girton III	73				
74	Girton III		Churchill IV	74				
75	Homerton		CCAT II	75				
76	Addenbrooke's		Trinity Hall IV	76				
77	CCAT II		1st & 3rd Trinity V	77				
78	Pembroke IV		Addenbrooke's	78				
79	King's III		Fitzwilliam III	79				
80	Fitzwilliam III		King's III	80				
81	Wolfson II		Pembroke IV	81				
82	1st & 3rd Trinity V		Wolfson II	82				
83	Queens' IV		Queens' IV	83				
84	Corpus Christi III		1st & 3rd Trinity VI	84				
85	1st & 3rd Trinity VI		Clare Hall	85				
86	Clare Hall		Corpus Christi III	86				
87	Selwyn IV		Darwin II	87				
88	Queens' V		Selwyn IV	88				
89	Christ's IV		St. Catharine's IV	89				
90	Darwin II		Queens' V	90				
91	St. Catharine's IV		Christ's IV	91				
92	Girton IV		Caius III	92				
93	Homerton II		Lady Margaret VI	93				
94	St Edmund's II		Homerton II	94				
95	Caius III		Clare V	95				
96	Lady Margaret VI		Girton IV	96				
97	Clare V		1st & 3rd Trinity VII	97				
98	1st & 3rd Trinity VII		St Edmund's II	98				
99	Churchill V		Downing V	99				
100	Downing V		Churchill V	100				
101	Darwin III		Darwin III	101				
102	Corpus Christi IV		Jesus VI	102				
103	Jesus VI		Corpus Christi IV	103				
