= May Bumps 1999 =

Rowing races at Cambridge University

The May Bumps 1999 were a set of rowing races held at Cambridge University from Wednesday 9 June 1999 to Saturday 12 June 1999. The event was run as a bumps race and was the 108th set of races in the series of May Bumps that have been held annually in mid-June since 1887. In 1999, a total of 172 crews took part (103 men's crews and 69 women's crews), with around 1550 participants in total.

== Head of the River crews ==
Caius men rowed-over in 1st position, retaining the headship.

Emmanuel women bumped Pembroke to take their 3rd ever Mays headship.

== Highest 2nd VIIIs ==
The highest men's 2nd VIII at the end of the week was 1st & 3rd Trinity II, who bumped Lady Margaret II on the 1st day and moved up into the 1st division.

The highest women's 2nd VIII was Emmanuel II, who bumped Jesus II on the 2nd day.

== Links to races in other years ==
Preceding year	Current year	Following year
May Bumps 1998	May Bumps 1999	May Bumps 2000
Lent Bumps 1998	Lent Bumps 1999	Lent Bumps 2000

== Bumps Charts ==
Below are the bumps charts for all divisions. The men's bumps charts are on the left, and women's bumps charts on the right. The bumps chart represents the progress of every crew over all four days of the racing. To follow the progress of any particular crew, simply find the crew's name on the left side of the chart and follow the line to the end-of-the-week finishing position on the right of the chart.

Pos	Crew	Men's Bumps Chart	Crew	Pos	Crew	Women's Bumps Chart	Crew	Pos
1	Caius		Caius	1	Pembroke		Emmanuel	1
2	Jesus		Jesus	2	Emmanuel		Newnham	2
3	1st & 3rd Trinity		1st & 3rd Trinity	3	Lady Margaret		Caius	3
4	Downing		Lady Margaret	4	Jesus		Pembroke	4
5	Lady Margaret		Emmanuel	5	Newnham		Lady Margaret	5
6	Queens'		Downing	6	Clare		Jesus	6
7	Pembroke		Pembroke	7	Caius		Trinity Hall	7
8	Trinity Hall		Trinity Hall	8	Trinity Hall		Queens'	8
9	Emmanuel		Fitzwilliam	9	Queens'		Clare	9
10	Magdalene		Queens'	10	Churchill		Churchill	10
11	Churchill		Christ's	11	Downing		Downing	11
12	Robinson		Churchill	12	Homerton		Christ's	12
13	Fitzwilliam		Peterhouse	13	Selwyn		Selwyn	13
14	Christ's		Magdalene	14	Christ's		St. Catharine's	14
15	St. Catharine's		Robinson	15	Magdalene		Homerton	15
16	Sidney Sussex		St. Catharine's	16	St. Catharine's		Robinson	16
17	Peterhouse		1st & 3rd Trinity II	17	Robinson		Magdalene	17
18	Clare		Clare	18	New Hall		New Hall	18
19	Lady Margaret II		Downing II	19	1st & 3rd Trinity		1st & 3rd Trinity	19
20	1st & 3rd Trinity II		Sidney Sussex	20	Sidney Sussex		Fitzwilliam	20
21	Downing II		Selwyn	21	Fitzwilliam		CCAT	21
22	Queens' II		Caius II	22	Peterhouse		Peterhouse	22
23	Selwyn		Lady Margaret II	23	Corpus Christi		Girton	23
24	Caius II		Girton	24	CCAT		Sidney Sussex	24
25	Girton		King's	25	Jesus II		Emmanuel II	25
26	King's		Queens' II	26	Girton		Newnham II	26
27	Trinity Hall II		Emmanuel II	27	Emmanuel II		Corpus Christi	27
28	Churchill II		Jesus II	28	King's		Darwin	28
29	Corpus Christi		Churchill II	29	Newnham II		Jesus II	29
30	Emmanuel II		Corpus Christi	30	Darwin		King's	30
31	Jesus II		Trinity Hall II	31	Lady Margaret II		Lady Margaret II	31
32	Christ's II		Wolfson	32	New Hall II		Caius II	32
33	Pembroke II		Pembroke II	33	Clare II		Queens' II	33
34	Wolfson		Christ's II	34	Trinity Hall II		New Hall II	34
35	Clare II		Clare II	35	Homerton II		Churchill II	35
36	St. Catharine's II		1st & 3rd Trinity III	36	Queens' II		Wolfson	36
37	Fitzwilliam II		CCAT	37	Churchill II		Trinity Hall II	37
38	1st & 3rd Trinity III		St. Catharine's II	38	Jesus III		Caius II	38
39	Lady Margaret III		Fitzwilliam II	39	Pembroke II		Homerton II	39
40	Selwyn II		Robinson II	40	Wolfson		Jesus III	40
41	CCAT		Lady Margaret III	41	St. Catharine's II		Pembroke II	41
42	Girton II		Peterhouse II	42	Magdalene II		1st & 3rd Trinity II	42
43	Magdalene II		Selwyn II	43	1st & 3rd Trinity II		Lady Margaret III	43
44	Robinson II		Darwin	44	Caius II		St. Catharine's II	44
45	Peterhouse II		Girton II	45	Girton II		CCAT II	45
46	Darwin		Lady Margaret IV	46	CCAT II		Magdalene II	46
47	Jesus III		Magdalene II	47	Lady Margaret III		Downing II	47
48	Lady Margaret IV		Downing III	48	Jesus IV		Girton II	48
49	Downing III		Jesus III	49	Fitzwilliam II		Jesus IV	49
50	Corpus Christi II		St Edmund's	50	Hughes Hall		Hughes Hall	50
51	Sidney Sussex II		Clare III	51	Downing II		Darwin II	51
52	St Edmund's		Corpus Christi II	52	1st & 3rd Trinity III		Fitzwilliam II	52
53	Queens' III		Sidney Sussex II	53	Robinson II		Clare Hall	53
54	Trinity Hall III		1st & 3rd Trinity IV	54	Clare Hall		Robinson II	54
55	Churchill III		Pembroke III	55	Selwyn II		Caius III	55
56	Clare III		Churchill III	56	Christ's II		Selwyn II	56
57	Jesus IV		Queens' III	57	Darwin II		Sidney Sussex II	57
58	King's II		Jesus IV	58	Clare III		1st & 3rd Trinity III	58
59	Pembroke III		St. Catharine's III	59	Caius III		Newnham III	59
60	1st & 3rd Trinity IV		Trinity Hall III	60	Sidney Sussex II		Christ's II	60
61	Lady Margaret V		Homerton	61	Newnham III		Churchill III	61
62	St. Catharine's III		King's II	62	Caius IV		Clare III	62
63	Downing IV		Emmanuel III	63	Jesus V		Girton III	63
64	Homerton		Lady Margaret V	64	Girton III		Jesus V	64
65	Christ's III		Girton III	65	Churchill III		Lady Margaret IV	65
66	Emmanuel III		Downing IV	66	Downing III		Caius IV	66
67	1st & 3rd Trinity V		CCAT II	67	Lady Margaret IV		King's II	67
68	Selwyn III		Selwyn III	68	King's II		Downing III	68
69	Clare IV		Christ's III	69	Lady Margaret V		Lady Margaret V	69
70	CCAT II		Jesus V	70				
71	Girton III		1st & 3rd Trinity V	71				
72	Fitzwilliam III		Trinity Hall IV	72				
73	Jesus V		Clare IV	73				
74	Churchill IV		Fitzwilliam III	74				
75	Trinity Hall IV		Darwin II	75				
76	Darwin II		Caius III	76				
77	Clare Hall		Homerton II	77				
78	1st & 3rd Trinity VI		Clare Hall	78				
79	Caius III		1st & 3rd Trinity VI	79				
80	Wolfson II		Churchill IV	80				
81	Corpus Christi III		Darwin III	81				
82	Lady Margaret VI		Wolfson II	82				
83	Homerton II		Corpus Christi III	83				
84	St. Catharine's IV		Jesus VI	84				
85	Darwin III		Lady Margaret VI	85				
86	1st & 3rd Trinity VII		1st & 3rd Trinity VII	86				
87	1st & 3rd Trinity VIII		St Edmund's II	87				
88	Girton IV		St. Catharine's IV	88				
89	Jesus VI		Girton IV	89				
90	St Edmund's II		1st & 3rd Trinity VIII	90				
91	Jesus VII		Robinson III	91				
92	Emmanuel IV		Caius IV	92				
93	1st & 3rd Trinity IX		Emmanuel IV	93				
94	Robinson III		1st & 3rd Trinity X	94				
95	Caius IV		Lady Margaret VII	95				
96	1st & 3rd Trinity X		Downing V	96				
97	Downing V		Jesus VII	97				
98	Lady Margaret VII		Sidney Sussex III	98				
99	Lady Margaret VIII		1st & 3rd Trinity IX	99				
100	Sidney Sussex III		Lady Margaret VIII	100				
101	Christ's IV		Christ's IV	101				
102	1st & 3rd Trinity XI		1st & 3rd Trinity XI	102				
103	Caius V		Caius V	103				

Note: Caius V only raced for the last two days
