= May Bumps 2009 =

Rowing races at Cambridge University

The May Bumps 2009 were a set of rowing races held in Cambridge, UK from Wednesday 10 June 2009 to Saturday 13 June 2009. The bumps featured crews from all Cambridge University Colleges and Anglia Ruskin University. The races were run as a bumps race and were the 118th set of races in the series of May Bumps which have been held annually in mid-June in this form since 1887. In 2009, a total of 171 crews are expected to take part (94 men's crews and 77 women's crews), with over 1500 participants in total.

Two clubs changed their names in 2009. New Hall became Murray Edwards reflecting the college name change. CCAT became Anglia Ruskin reflecting the change in the University's name a couple of years previously.

== Head of the River crews ==
1st & 3rd Trinity M1 rowed over to retain the headship gained in 2008 despite determined attacks from Caius on the Friday and Saturday. Caius managed to close to within a third of a length for much of the course on the Friday.

Pembroke W1 also rowed over to retain their headship gained in 2008.

This was the first time since 1994 that there was no change in either the men's or women's headship.

== Highest 2nd VIIIs ==
1st & 3rd Trinity II remained the highest men's 2nd VIII at the end of the week, despite being bumped into 15th position.

Jesus II remained the highest women's 2nd VIII at the end of the week at 17th position, having started 15th.

== Pegasus Cup and the Biggest Risers ==
Hughes Hall won the Pegasus cup again, claiming it back after a one-year loan to St Edmunds. Three of the club's boats got blades and their second men's boat had a meteoric rise of eleven places up the rankings.

In the women's competition, Sidney Sussex III climbed eleven places, finishing above Sidney Sussex II

== Links to races in other years ==
Preceding year	Current year	Following year
May Bumps 2008	May Bumps 2009	May Bumps 2010
Lent Bumps 2008	Lent Bumps 2009	Lent Bumps 2010

== Bumps Charts ==
Below are the bumps charts all 6 men's and all 5 women's divisions, with the men's event on the left and women's event on the right. The bumps chart represents the progress of every crew over all four days of the racing. To follow the progress of any particular crew, simply find the crew's name on the left side of the chart and follow the line to the end-of-the-week finishing position on the right of the chart.

Note that this chart may not be displayed correctly if you are using a large font size on your browser. A simple way to check is to see that the first horizontal bold line, marking the boundary between divisions, lies between positions 17 and 18. The combined Hughes Hall/ Lucy Cavendish women's crews are listed as Lucy Cavendish only.

Pos	Crew	Men's Bumps Chart	Crew	Pos	Crew	Women's Bumps Chart	Crew	Pos
1	1st & 3rd Trinity		1st & 3rd Trinity	1	Pembroke		Pembroke	1
2	Lady Margaret		Caius	2	Jesus		Jesus	2
3	Jesus		Jesus	3	Emmanuel		Caius	3
4	Caius		Lady Margaret	4	Caius		Emmanuel	4
5	Queens'		Pembroke	5	Girton		Downing	5
6	St. Catharine's		Downing	6	Lady Margaret		Lady Margaret	6
7	Downing		Queens'	7	Newnham		Christ's	7
8	Trinity Hall		Trinity Hall	8	Clare		Girton	8
9	Pembroke		Clare	9	Downing		1st & 3rd Trinity	9
10	Churchill		St. Catharine's	10	1st & 3rd Trinity		Newnham	10
11	Clare		Fitzwilliam	11	Christ's		Clare	11
12	Emmanuel		Magdalene	12	Trinity Hall		Magdalene	12
13	Fitzwilliam		Churchill	13	Queens'		Queens'	13
14	1st & 3rd Trinity II		Emmanuel	14	Magdalene		Churchill	14
15	Christ's		1st & 3rd Trinity II	15	Jesus II		St. Catharine's	15
16	Magdalene		Christ's	16	King's		Trinity Hall	16
17	Robinson		King's	17	Churchill		Jesus II	17
18	Lady Margaret II		Robinson	18	Peterhouse		King's	18
19	Selwyn		Lady Margaret II	19	St. Catharine's		Peterhouse	19
20	Caius II		Peterhouse	20	Darwin		Pembroke II	20
21	King's		Selwyn	21	Pembroke II		Selwyn	21
22	Peterhouse		Downing II	22	Selwyn		Darwin	22
23	Downing II		Girton	23	Emmanuel II		Anglia Ruskin	23
24	Anglia Ruskin		Caius II	24	Anglia Ruskin		Lady Margaret II	24
25	Wolfson		Darwin	25	Robinson		Robinson	25
26	Girton		Jesus II	26	Fitzwilliam		Homerton	26
27	Darwin		Anglia Ruskin	27	Lady Margaret II		Emmanuel II	27
28	Emmanuel II		Homerton	28	Homerton		Sidney Sussex	28
29	Jesus II		Wolfson	29	Murray Edwards		Fitzwilliam	29
30	Homerton		St Edmund's	30	Sidney Sussex		Murray Edwards	30
31	Corpus Christi		Queens' II	31	Downing II		Downing II	31
32	St Edmund's		Emmanuel II	32	Corpus Christi		Clare II	32
33	Sidney Sussex		Sidney Sussex	33	Girton II		Corpus Christi	33
34	Queens' II		Selwyn II	34	Caius II		Caius II	34
35	St. Catharine's II		Corpus Christi	35	Newnham II		Newnham II	35
36	Pembroke II		1st & 3rd Trinity III	36	Clare II		Lucy Cavendish	36
37	Selwyn II		Christ's II	37	Wolfson		Girton II	37
38	1st & 3rd Trinity III		St. Catharine's II	38	Queens' II		Magdalene II	38
39	Churchill II		Pembroke II	39	Trinity Hall II		Wolfson	39
40	Fitzwilliam II		Magdalene II	40	Lucy Cavendish		1st & 3rd Trinity II	40
41	Magdalene II		Clare II	41	Jesus III		Queens' II	41
42	Christ's II		Churchill II	42	Magdalene II		St Edmund's	42
43	Girton II		Lady Margaret III	43	1st & 3rd Trinity II		Trinity Hall II	43
44	Clare II		Fitzwilliam II	44	St Edmund's		Pembroke III	44
45	Robinson II		Peterhouse II	45	Darwin II		Jesus III	45
46	Lady Margaret III		Hughes Hall	46	Selwyn II		Emmanuel III	46
47	Jesus III		Girton II	47	Anglia Ruskin II		Selwyn II	47
48	Peterhouse II		Trinity Hall II	48	Pembroke III		Christ's II	48
49	Trinity Hall II		Robinson II	49	Lady Margaret III		Darwin II	49
50	Hughes Hall		Jesus III	50	Emmanuel III		Anglia Ruskin II	50
51	Darwin II		Queens' III	51	St. Catharine's II		Lady Margaret III	51
52	Queens' III		Darwin II	52	Churchill II		St. Catharine's II	52
53	Emmanuel III		Wolfson II	53	Christ's II		Newnham III	53
54	Selwyn III		Selwyn III	54	Murray Edwards II		Churchill II	54
55	Downing III		King's II	55	1st & 3rd Trinity III		Clare Hall	55
56	St. Catharine's III		Emmanuel III	56	Homerton II		1st & 3rd Trinity III	56
57	Wolfson II		Downing III	57	Newnham III		Homerton II	57
58	Clare III		Caius III	58	Queens' III		Murray Edwards II	58
59	King's II		St. Catharine's III	59	Clare Hall		Fitzwilliam II	59
60	Trinity Hall III		Pembroke III	60	Addenbrooke's		Sidney Sussex III	60
61	Pembroke III		Clare III	61	Fitzwilliam II		Sidney Sussex II	61
62	Caius III		Clare Hall	62	Robinson II		Robinson II	62
63	Jesus IV		Trinity Hall III	63	Newnham IV		Magdalene III	63
64	Corpus Christi II		1st & 3rd Trinity IV	64	Sidney Sussex II		Addenbrooke's	64
65	Clare Hall		Anglia Ruskin II	65	King's II		Queens' III	65
66	1st & 3rd Trinity IV		Lady Margaret IV	66	Magdalene III		Clare III	66
67	Lady Margaret IV		Jesus IV	67	Jesus IV		Newnham IV	67
68	Christ's III		Corpus Christi II	68	Girton III		Emmanuel IV	68
69	Sidney Sussex II		Sidney Sussex II	69	Clare III		King's II	69
70	Churchill III		Christ's III	70	Downing III		Jesus IV	70
71	Christ's IV		1st & 3rd Trinity V	71	Sidney Sussex III		Lucy Cavendish II	71
72	Anglia Ruskin II		Christ's IV	72	Emmanuel IV		Girton III	72
73	1st & 3rd Trinity V		St Edmund's II	73	Clare IV		Emmanuel IV	73
74	Robinson III		Magdalene III	74	Lucy Cavendish II		Downing III	74
75	Caius IV		Churchill III	75	Emmanuel V		Clare IV	75
76	St Edmund's II		Homerton II	76	Girton IV		Trinity Hall III	76
77	Magdalene III		Robinson III	77	Trinity Hall III		Girton IV	77
78	Pembroke IV		Jesus V	78				
79	Homerton II		Caius IV	79				
80	Jesus V		Sidney Sussex III	80				
81	Fitzwilliam III		King's III	81				
82	Sidney Sussex III		Pembroke IV	82				
83	Lady Margaret V		Lady Margaret VI	83				
84	King's III		Hughes Hall II	84				
85	Queens' IV		Fitzwilliam III	85				
86	Lady Margaret VI		Lady Margaret V	86				
87	Downing IV		Pembroke V	87				
88	Anglia Ruskin III		Queens' IV	88				
89	Pembroke V		Christ's V	89				
90	Girton III		Downing IV	90				
91	1st & 3rd Trinity VI		Sidney Sussex IV	91				
92	Christ's V		Anglia Ruskin III	92				
93	Sidney Sussex IV		Girton III	93				
94	Hughes Hall II		1st & 3rd Trinity VI	94				

== The Getting-on Race ==
The Getting-on Race allows a number of crews which did not already have a place from last year's races to compete for the right to race this year. Up to ten crews are removed from the bottom of last year's finishing order, who must then race alongside new entrants to decide which crews gain a place (with one bumps place per 3 crews competing, subject to the maximum of 10 available places).

The 2009 May Bumps Getting-on Race took place on 5 June 2009.

=== Competing crews ===
==== Men ====
12 men's crews raced for 4 available spaces at the bottom of the 6th division. The following were successful and will row in the bumps.

- Christ's V
- 1st & 3rd Trinity VI
- Hughes Hall II
- Sidney Sussex IV

The following were unsuccessful.

- Magdalene IV
- Downing V
- Wolfson III
- Darwin III
- Homerton III
- Girton IV
- 1st & 3rd Trinity VII

The following did not race.

- Hughes Hall III

==== Women ====
7 women's crews raced for 6 available spaces at the bottom of the 5th division. The following were successful and will row in the bumps.

- Clare IV
- Emmanuel IV
- Emmanuel V
- Girton IV
- Hughes Hall II/*Lucy Cavendish II
- Trinity Hall III

The following did not race.

- Queens' IV
