= May Bumps 2006 =

Rowing races at Cambridge University

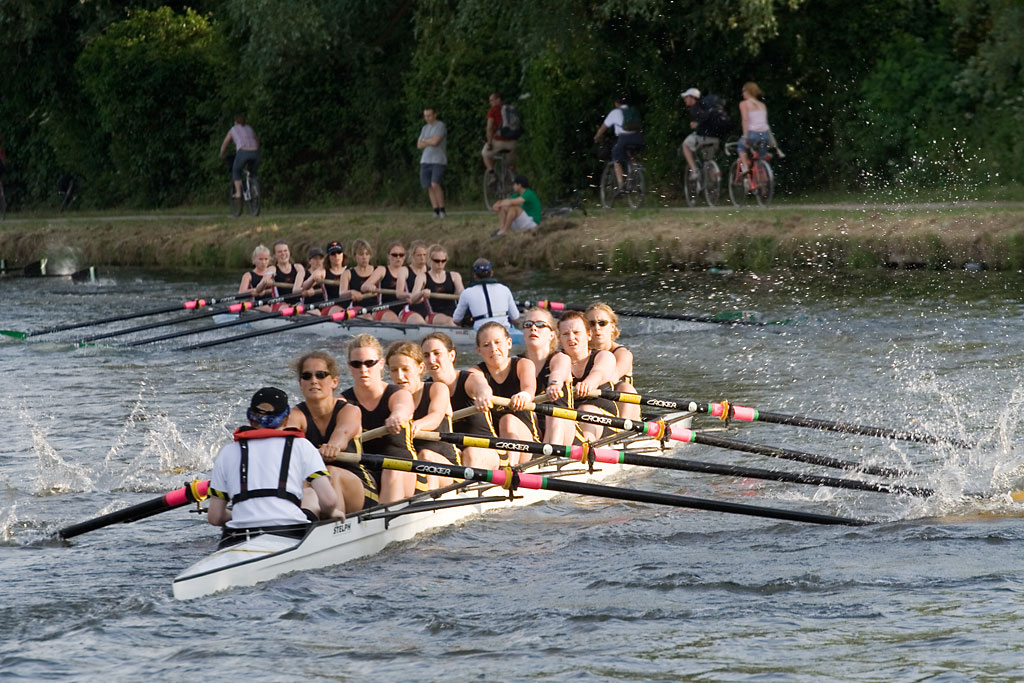
Girton College Boat Club racing in the May Bumps 2006.

The May Bumps 2006 were a set of rowing races held at Cambridge University from Wednesday 14 June 2006 to Saturday 17 June 2006. The event was run as a bumps race and was the 115th set of races in the series of May Bumps have been held annually in mid-June since 1887. In 2006, 171 crews took part (94 men's crews and 77 women's crews), with around 1500 participants in total.

== Head of the River crews ==
Caius for the 5th consecutive year, their 8th since 1998.

Pembroke women bumped Jesus on Day 1 to take their first headship since 1998.

== Highest 2nd VIIIs ==
Caius II eventually bumped 1st & 3rd Trinity II on the last day to become the highest placed 2nd VIII, after a set of close races with Selwyn.

Jesus II bumped Emmanuel II on their way to winning their blades, bumping every day to become highest 2nd women's VIII.

== Links to races in other years ==
Preceding year	Current year	Following year
May Bumps 2005	May Bumps 2006	May Bumps 2007
Lent Bumps 2005	Lent Bumps 2006	Lent Bumps 2007

== Bumps charts ==
Below are the bumps charts for the top 3 men's and women's divisions, with the men's event on the left and women's event on the right. The bumps chart represents the progress of every crew over all four days of the racing. To follow the progress of any particular crew, simply find the crew's name on the left side of the chart and follow the line to the end-of-the-week finishing position on the right of the chart.

Note that this chart may not be displayed correctly if you are using a large font size on your browser.

Pos	Crew	Men's Bumps Chart	Crew	Pos	Crew	Women's Bumps Chart	Crew	Pos
1	Caius		Caius	1	Jesus		Pembroke	1
2	Lady Margaret		St. Catharine's	2	Pembroke		Jesus	2
3	Trinity Hall		Lady Margaret	3	Emmanuel		Emmanuel	3
4	St. Catharine's		Queens'	4	Caius		Caius	4
5	Queens'		1st & 3rd Trinity	5	Clare		Trinity Hall	5
6	Downing		Churchill	6	Girton		Girton	6
7	1st & 3rd Trinity		Trinity Hall	7	Lady Margaret		Newnham	7
8	Churchill		Jesus	8	Trinity Hall		Clare	8
9	Robinson		Downing	9	Newnham		Downing	9
10	Jesus		Pembroke	10	Magdalene		Lady Margaret	10
11	Magdalene		Emmanuel	11	Christ's		Churchill	11
12	Pembroke		Christ's	12	Downing		1st & 3rd Trinity	12
13	Emmanuel		Robinson	13	Churchill		Magdalene	13
14	Clare		Clare	14	Selwyn		King's	14
15	Christ's		Magdalene	15	1st & 3rd Trinity		Christ's	15
16	Selwyn		Caius II	16	New Hall		Queens'	16
17	1st & 3rd Trinity II		1st & 3rd Trinity II	17	King's		Selwyn	17
18	Caius II		Wolfson	18	St. Catharine's		St. Catharine's	18
19	Downing II		Selwyn	19	Queens'		Jesus II	19
20	Peterhouse		Fitzwilliam	20	Fitzwilliam		New Hall	20
21	Wolfson		Peterhouse	21	Darwin		Darwin	21
22	Lady Margaret II		Downing II	22	Emmanuel II		Peterhouse	22
23	Fitzwilliam		King's	23	Jesus II		CCAT	23
24	CCAT		Lady Margaret II	24	Peterhouse		Fitzwilliam	24
25	Sidney Sussex		CCAT	25	CCAT		Lady Margaret II	25
26	King's		Jesus II	26	Pembroke II		Emmanuel II	26
27	St. Catharine's II		St. Catharine's II	27	Caius II		Caius II	27
28	Corpus Christi		Corpus Christi	28	Robinson		Pembroke II	28
29	Jesus II		Sidney Sussex	29	Lady Margaret II		Newnham II	29
30	Girton		Emmanuel II	30	Sidney Sussex		Wolfson	30
31	Queens' II		Girton	31	Wolfson		Robinson	31
32	Emmanuel II		Darwin	32	Newnham II		Homerton	32
33	Darwin		Queens' II	33	Homerton		Sidney Sussex	33
34	Churchill II		Selwyn II	34	Girton II		Girton II	34
35	Robinson II		Churchill II	35	Trinity Hall II		Clare II	35
36	Selwyn II		Robinson II	36	St. Catharine's II		Queens' II	36
37	Girton II		Magdalene II	37	Clare II		Trinity Hall II	37
38	Trinity Hall II		Homerton	38	Jesus III		Downing II	38
39	Homerton		St. Edmund's	39	Downing II		Jesus III	39
40	Clare II		Girton II	40	Queens' II		Corpus Christi	40
41	Christ's II		Pembroke II	41	New Hall II		St. Catharine's II	41
42	St. Edmund's		Trinity Hall II	42	Lady Margaret III		Darwin II	42
43	Magdalene II		1st & 3rd Trinity III	43	Churchill II		Lady Margaret III	43
44	Lady Margaret III		Christ's II	44	Corpus Christi		1st & 3rd Trinity II	44
45	Pembroke II		Lady Margaret III	45	Clare Hall		New Hall II	45
46	1st & 3rd Trinity III		Clare II	46	Darwin II		Magdalene II	46
47	Downing III		Fitzwilliam II	47	1st & 3rd Trinity II		Churchill II	47
48	Emmanuel III		Emmanuel III	48	Magdalene II		Hughes Hall	48
49	Fitzwilliam II		Peterhouse II	49	CCAT II		Clare Hall	49
50	Trinity Hall III		Jesus III	50	Homerton II		CCAT II	50
51	Peterhouse II		Downing III	51	Hughes Hall		Veterinary School	51

== The Getting-on Race ==
The Getting-on Race (GoR) allows a number of crews which did not already have a place from last year's races to compete for the right to race this year. Up to ten crews are removed from the bottom of last year's finishing order, who must then race alongside new entrants to decide which crews gain a place (with one bumps place per 3 crews competing, subject to the maximum of 10 available places).

The 2006 May Bumps Getting-on Race took place on 9 June 2006.

=== Successful crews ===
The successful crews which will compete in the bumps are (displayed in alphabetical order);

==== Women ====
- CCAT III
- Corpus Christi II
- Emmanuel IV
- Newnham IV
- Pembroke IV
- Pembroke V (Replaced a crew that scratched)
- Trinity Hall III

==== Men ====
- CCAT II
- Emmanuel IV
- Jesus VI
- Queens' IV
- Wolfson III
