= May Bumps 2008 =

Rowing races at Cambridge University

The May Bumps 2008 were a set of rowing races held at Cambridge University from Wednesday 11 June 2008 to Saturday 14 June 2008. The event was run as a bumps race and was the 117th set of races in the series of May Bumps which have been held annually in mid-June in this form since 1887. In 2008, a total of 171 crews took part (94 men's crews and 77 women's crews), with over 1500 participants in total.

== Head of the River crews ==
1st & 3rd Trinity men bumped Caius on the first day to take the headship for the first time since 1973; the first change in men's headship since 2002.

Pembroke women bumped Jesus on the first day to take back the headship they lost in 2007.

== Highest 2nd VIIIs ==
1st & 3rd Trinity II were the highest men's 2nd VIII at the end of the week, holding 14th position.

Jesus II were the highest women's 2nd VIII at the end of the week at 15th position, having started 16th.

== Links to races in other years ==
Preceding year	Current year	Following year
May Bumps 2007	May Bumps 2008	May Bumps 2009
Lent Bumps 2007	Lent Bumps 2008	Lent Bumps 2009

== Bumps Charts ==
Below are the bumps charts all 6 men's and all 5 women's divisions, with the men's event on the left and women's event on the right. The bumps chart represents the progress of every crew over all four days of the racing. To follow the progress of any particular crew, simply find the crew's name on the left side of the chart and follow the line to the end-of-the-week finishing position on the right of the chart.

Note that this chart may not be displayed correctly if you are using a large font size on your browser. A simple way to check is to see that the first horizontal bold line, marking the boundary between divisions, lies between positions 17 and 18. The combined Hughes Hall/ Lucy Cavendish women's crews are listed as Lucy Cavendish only.

Pos	Crew	Men's Bumps Chart	Crew	Pos	Crew	Women's Bumps Chart	Crew	Pos
1	Caius		1st & 3rd Trinity	1	Jesus		Pembroke	1
2	1st & 3rd Trinity		Lady Margaret	2	Pembroke		Jesus	2
3	Lady Margaret		Jesus	3	Emmanuel		Emmanuel	3
4	Trinity Hall		Caius	4	Newnham		Caius	4
5	Jesus		Queens'	5	Caius		Girton	5
6	St. Catharine's		St. Catharine's	6	Girton		Lady Margaret	6
7	Churchill		Downing	7	1st & 3rd Trinity		Newnham	7
8	Queens'		Trinity Hall	8	Trinity Hall		Clare	8
9	Downing		Pembroke	9	Lady Margaret		Downing	9
10	Emmanuel		Churchill	10	Clare		1st & 3rd Trinity	10
11	Pembroke		Clare	11	Downing		Christ's	11
12	Clare		Emmanuel	12	Queens'		Trinity Hall	12
13	Robinson		Fitzwilliam	13	Churchill		Queens'	13
14	1st & 3rd Trinity II		1st & 3rd Trinity II	14	Christ's		Magdalene	14
15	Christ's		Christ's	15	St. Catharine's		Jesus II	15
16	Fitzwilliam		Magdalene	16	Jesus II		King's	16
17	Magdalene		Robinson	17	King's		Churchill	17
18	Caius II		Lady Margaret II	18	Peterhouse		Peterhouse	18
19	Selwyn		Selwyn	19	Magdalene		St. Catharine's	19
20	King's		Caius II	20	CCAT		Darwin	20
21	Wolfson		King's	21	Selwyn		Pembroke II	21
22	Lady Margaret II		Peterhouse	22	Fitzwilliam		Selwyn	22
23	Peterhouse		Downing II	23	Darwin		Emmanuel II	23
24	Downing II		CCAT	24	Pembroke II		CCAT	24
25	CCAT		Wolfson	25	New Hall		Robinson	25
26	Emmanuel II		Girton	26	Emmanuel II		Fitzwilliam	26
27	Jesus II		Darwin	27	Lady Margaret II		Lady Margaret II	27
28	Corpus Christi		Emmanuel II	28	Robinson		Homerton	28
29	Girton		Jesus II	29	Homerton		New Hall	29
30	Darwin		Homerton	30	Girton II		Sidney Sussex	30
31	St. Catharine's II		Corpus Christi	31	Caius II		Downing II	31
32	St Edmund's		St Edmund's	32	Sidney Sussex		Corpus Christi	32
33	Sidney Sussex		Sidney Sussex	33	Wolfson		Girton II	33
34	Homerton		Queens' II	34	Downing II		Caius II	34
35	Queens' II		St. Catharine's II	35	Newnham II		Newnham II	35
36	Churchill II		Pembroke II	36	Corpus Christi		Clare II	36
37	Pembroke II		Selwyn II	37	Queens' II		Wolfson	37
38	Selwyn II		1st & 3rd Trinity III	38	Jesus III		Queens' II	38
39	Girton II		Churchill II	39	Clare II		Trinity Hall II	39
40	1st & 3rd Trinity III		Fitzwilliam II	40	1st & 3rd Trinity II		Lucy Cavendish	40
41	Robinson II		Magdalene II	41	Trinity Hall II		Jesus III	41
42	Magdalene II		Christ's II	42	Magdalene II		Magdalene II	42
43	Fitzwilliam II		Girton II	43	Darwin II		1st & 3rd Trinity II	43
44	Christ's II		Clare II	44	Lucy Cavendish		St Edmund's	44
45	Clare II		Robinson II	45	St. Catharine's II		Vet School	45
46	Trinity Hall II		Lady Margaret III	46	CCAT II		Darwin II	46
47	Jesus III		Jesus III	47	Lady Margaret III		Selwyn II	47
48	Lady Margaret III		Peterhouse II	48	Vet School		CCAT II	48
49	Emmanuel III		Trinity Hall II	49	New Hall II		Pembroke III	49
50	Hughes Hall		Hughes Hall	50	Churchill II		Lady Margaret III	50
51	Darwin II		Darwin II	51	St Edmund's		Emmanuel II	51
52	Peterhouse II		Queens' III	52	Selwyn II		St. Catharine's II	52
53	St. Catharine's III		Emmanuel III	53	1st & 3rd Trinity III		Churchill III	53
54	Queens' III		Selwyn III	54	Pembroke III		Christ's II	54
55	Downing III		Downing III	55	Newnham III		New Hall II	55
56	Clare III		St. Catharine's III	56	Emmanuel III		New Hall III	56
57	Trinity Hall III		Wolfson II	57	Homerton II		1st & 3rd Trinity III	57
58	Selwyn III		Clare III	58	Christ's II		Homerton II	58
59	Caius III		King's II	59	Addenbrooke's		Newnham III	59
60	Corpus Christi II		Trinity Hall III	60	New Hall III		Pembroke IV	60
61	Wolfson II		Pembroke III	61	Queens' III		Queens' III	61
62	1st & 3rd Trinity IV		Caius III	62	Robinson II		Clare Hall	62
63	King's II		Jesus IV	63	Pembroke IV		Addenbrooke's	63
64	Lady Margaret IV		Corpus Christi II	64	Fitzwilliam II		Fitzwilliam II	64
65	Pembroke III		Clare Hall	65	Newnham IV		Robinson II	65
66	Churchill III		1st & 3rd Trinity IV	66	Clare Hall		CCAT III	66
67	Jesus IV		Lady Margaret IV	67	CCAT III		Newnham IV	67
68	Clare Hall		Christ's III	68	Girton III		Sidney Sussex II	68
69	Christ's III		Sidney Sussex II	69	Magdalene III		King's II	69
70	Sidney Sussex II		Churchill III	70	King's II		Magdalene III	70
71	Caius IV		Christ's IV	71	Downing III		Jesus IV	71
72	1st & 3rd Trinity V		CCAT II	72	Sidney Sussex II		Girton III	72
73	Magdalene III		1st & 3rd Trinity V	73	Jesus IV		Clare III	73
74	Christ's IV		Robinson III	74	Sidney Sussex III		Peterhouse II	74
75	CCAT II		Caius IV	75	Clare III		Downing III	75
76	Robinson III		St Edmund's II	76	Clare Hall II		Sidney Sussex III	76
77	Jesus V		Magdalene III	77	Peterhouse II		Clare Hall II	77
78	Lady Margaret V		Pembroke IV	78				
79	Fitzwilliam III		Homerton II	79				
80	Pembroke IV		Jesus V	80				
81	Homerton II		Fitzwilliam III	81				
82	St Edmund's II		Sidney Sussex III	82				
83	Queens' IV		Emmanuel IV	83				
84	Sidney Sussex III		Lady Margaret V	84				
85	Lady Margaret VI		King's III	85				
86	Girton III		Queens' IV	86				
87	Emmanuel IV		Lady Margaret VI	87				
88	CCAT III		Downing IV	88				
89	Darwin III		CCAT III	89				
90	Girton IV		Pembroke V	90				
91	Downing IV		Girton III	91				
92	King's III		Clare Hall II	92				
93	Pembroke V		Darwin III	93				
94	Clare Hall II		Girton IV	94				

== The Getting-on Race ==
The Getting-on Race (GoR) allows a number of crews which did not already have a place from last year's races to compete for the right to race this year. Up to ten crews are removed from the bottom of last year's finishing order, who must then race alongside new entrants to decide which crews gain a place (with one bumps place per 3 crews competing, subject to the maximum of 10 available places).

The 2008 May Bumps Getting-on Race took place on 6 June 2008.

=== Competing crews ===
==== Men ====
7 men's crews raced for 3 available spaces at the bottom of the 6th division. The following were successful and rowed in the bumps.

- Downing IV
- King's III
- Pembroke V
- Clare Hall II

The following were unsuccessful.

- Hughes Hall II
- Sidney Sussex IV
- 1st & 3rd Trinity VI

==== Women ====
10 women's crews raced for 3 available spaces at the bottom of the 5th division, but subsequently 2 further places became available. The following were successful and rowed in the bumps.

- Jesus IV
- Sidney Sussex III
- Clare III
- Clare Hall II
- Peterhouse II

The following were unsuccessful.

- Pembroke V
- Clare IV
- Clare V
- Trinity Hall III

The following did not race.

- Lady Margaret IV
