= May Bumps 1974 =

Rowing races at Cambridge University

The May Bumps 1974 were a set of rowing races held at Cambridge University in June 1974. The event was run as a bumps race and was the 83rd set of races in the series of May Bumps which have been held annually in mid-June since 1887. In 1974, women's crews competed for the first time, although unlike the men's eights, they competed in fours. A total of 149 crews took part (137 men's crews and 12 women's crews), with around 1200 participants in total.

== Head of the River crews ==
Lady Margaret men bumped Jesus and First and Third to take the headship for the tenth time.

Clare women rowed over in the inaugural women's event to take the headship.

== Highest 2nd boats ==
Lady Margaret 2nd men rose six places to be the highest placed second boat.

The highest women's 2nd crew was Newnham II, finished in third behind the first boat.

== Links to Races in Other Years ==
Preceding year	Current year	Following year
May Bumps 1973	May Bumps 1974	May Bumps 1975
Lent Bumps 1973	Lent Bumps 1974	Lent Bumps 1975

== Bumps Charts ==
Below are the bumps charts for the men's and women's 1st divisions. The men's bumps charts are on the left, and women's bumps charts on the right. The bumps chart represents the progress of every crew over all four days of the racing. To follow the progress of any particular crew, simply find the crew's name on the left side of the chart and follow the line to the end-of-the-week finishing position on the right of the chart.

Pos	Crew	Men's Bumps Chart	Crew	Pos	Crew	Women's Bumps Chart	Crew	Pos
1	1st & 3rd Trinity		Lady Margaret	1	Clare		Clare	1
2	Jesus		Pembroke	2	New Hall		Newnham	2
3	Lady Margaret		Jesus	3	Newnham		Newnham II	3
4	Emmanuel		Fitzwilliam	4	Newnham II		Churchill	4
5	Pembroke		1st & 3rd Trinity	5	Girton		Wolfson	5
6	St. Catharine's		Clare	6	Churchill		New Hall	6
7	Fitzwilliam		Emmanuel	7	Girton II		Girton	7
8	Clare		Selwyn	8	Wolfson		Newnham III	8
9	Trinity Hall		Trinity Hall	9	New Hall II		New Hall II	9
10	Selwyn		St. Catharine's	10	Girton III		Newnham IV	10
11	Queens'		Downing	11	Newnham III		Girton II	11
12	Churchill		Caius	12	Newnham IV		Girton III	12
13	Caius		Queens'	13				
14	Magdalene		Magdalene	14				
15	Downing		Churchill	15				
16	Christ's		Lady Margaret II	16				
