= Milton Brewery =

Brewery in Waterbeach, England

- Location: Waterbeach, Cambridgeshire, England
- Opened: 1999; 27 years ago
- Owner: Independent

Active beers
Name	Type
Minotaur	Mild
Jupiter	Bitter
Dionysus	Pale Bitter
Pegasus	Best Bitter
Sparta	Pale Best Bitter
Nero	Vanilla Oatmeal Stout

Milton Brewery is in the village of Waterbeach, 6 miles (9.7 km) north of Cambridge, England. It moved in 2012 from the neighbouring village of Milton.

The brewery was established in 1999. Its first beer, Pegasus, has won several awards including Joint Bronze in the 2012 CAMRA Champion Beer of Britain Best Bitter Class. In 2006, the brewery created the Pegasus Cup which is awarded to the Cambridge University college boat club which is most successful in the annual May Bumping Races.

The Milton Brewery has a pub-owning sister company which owns the Devonshire Arms, Haymakers, The Rose And Crown and Queen Edith in Cambridge.
