= May Bumps =

Annual set of rowing races in Cambridge, England

- Head of the River (The Headship)
Peterhouse Open	Jesus Women
Highest 2^{nd} Eight (Open)	Lady Margaret (Division I)
Highest 2^{nd} Eight (Women)	Jesus College (Division II)
Course	Cam (upstream)
Course length	c. 2200m for the Head boat
- 'Last Mays: 17th June – 20th June 2026
- CUCBC - Mays

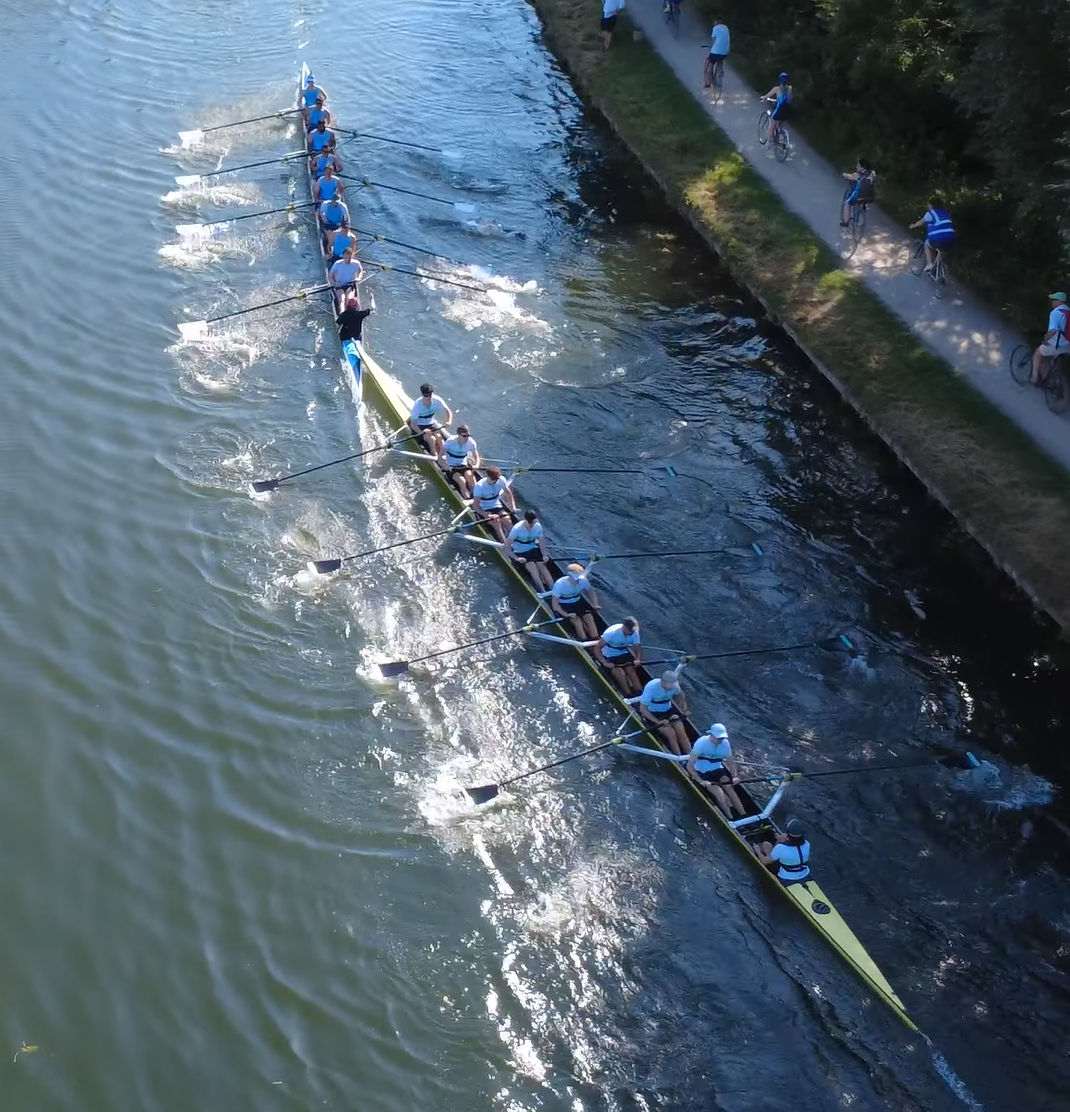
Caius O2 bumping Hughes Hall, Friday 2026

The May Bumps (also May Races, Mays) are a set of rowing races, held annually on the River Cam in Cambridge, England. They began in 1887 after separating from the Lent Bumps, the equivalent bumping races held at the end of February or start of March. Prior to the separation there had been a single set of annual bumps dating from its inception in 1827. The races are open to all college boat clubs from the University of Cambridge, the University Medical and Veterinary Schools and the Anglia Ruskin Boat Club. The May Bumps takes place over four days (Wednesday to Saturday) in mid-June and is run as a bumps race.

== Structure of the May Bumps ==
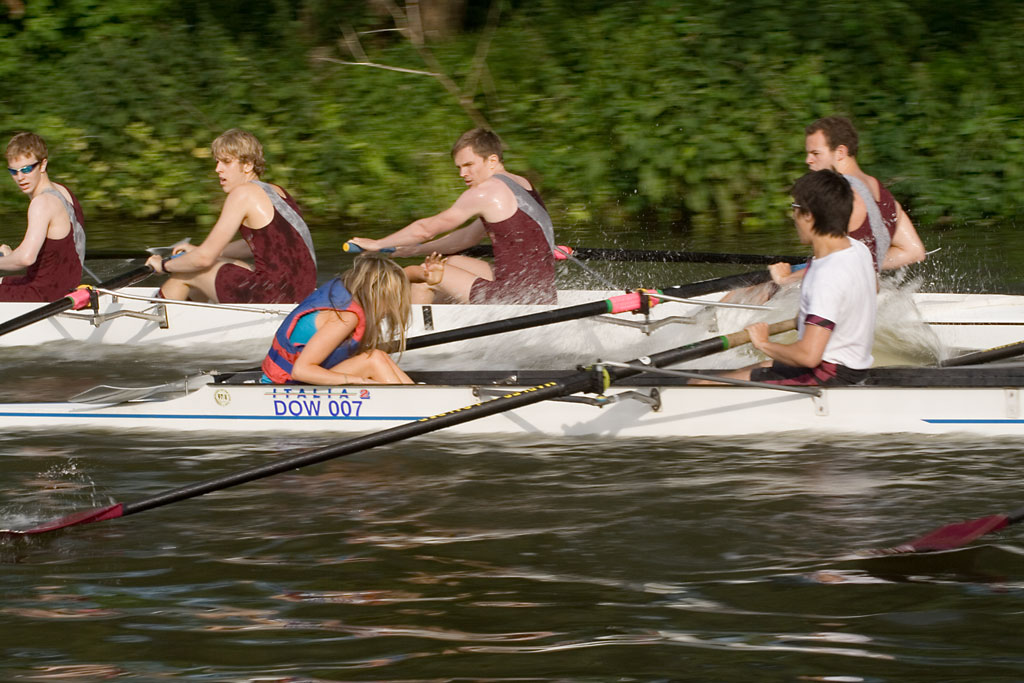
Downing II getting bumped by Fitzwilliam during the May Bumps 2006.

The races are run in divisions, each containing 17 crews. The number of crews in each bottom division varies yearly depending on new entrants. Each crew contains eight rowers and one coxswain. A total of 154 crews took part in 2014, totalling around 1390 participants. There are currently six divisions for men's crews (referred to as M1, M2...M6) and four divisions for women's crews (similarly W1–W4). The divisions represent a total race order with Division 1 at the top. The ultimate aim is to try and finish Head of the River (also said as gaining the 'Headship'), i.e. 1st position in division 1.

At the start, signalled by a cannon, each crew's coxswain holds on to a chain attached to the bank. The chain points are 150 ft (approx. 45 m), meaning each crew is separated by a distance of about 1 1/2 boat lengths (approximately 30 m or 90 ft). Once the race has begun, a crew must attempt to catch up with the crew ahead of it and bump (physically touch or overtake) it before the crew behind does the same to them. A crew which bumps or is bumped must pull to the side of the river to allow all the other crews to continue racing. If a crew is able to catch and bump the boat which started three places in front of it, after the two in front have already bumped out, the crew is said to have over-bumped. A crew which neither bumps a crew ahead nor is bumped by a crew behind before crossing the finishing post is said to have rowed over.

After the race, any crew which bumps or over-bumps swaps places with the crew that it has bumped for the following day's racing. A crew which rows over stays in the same position. Crews finishing at the top of a division also start at the bottom of the next division, as the sandwich boat, in an attempt to try to move up into the next division. The process is repeated over four days, allowing crews to move up or down several places in the overall order of boats. The finishing order of one year's May Bumps are then used as the starting order of the following year's races.

== Head of the River ==
=== Open May Bumps (1887–2026) ===
1887	Trinity Hall	1888	Trinity Hall	1889	3rd Trinity	1890	Trinity Hall	1891	Trinity Hall	1892	Trinity Hall
1893	3rd Trinity	1894	Trinity Hall	1895	Trinity Hall	1896	Trinity Hall	1897	3rd Trinity	1898	1st Trinity
1899	1st Trinity	1900	1st Trinity	1901	3rd Trinity	1902	3rd Trinity	1903	3rd Trinity	1904	3rd Trinity
1905	3rd Trinity	1906	3rd Trinity	1907	Trinity Hall	1908	Trinity Hall	1909	Jesus	1910	Jesus
1911	1st Trinity	1912	Jesus	1913	Jesus	1914	Jesus	1919	3rd Trinity	1920	Jesus
1921	Jesus	1922	Jesus	1923	Pembroke	1924	Jesus	1925	Jesus	1926	Lady Margaret
1927	Jesus	1928	1st Trinity	1929	3rd Trinity	1930	Jesus	1931	Pembroke	1932	Pembroke
1933	Pembroke	1934	Pembroke	1935	Jesus	1936	Jesus	1937	Jesus	1938	Jesus
1939	Jesus	1941	Clare	1942	Clare	1943	Clare	1944	Clare	1945	1st & 3rd Trinity
1946	Trinity Hall	1947	Jesus	1948	Jesus	1949	Clare	1950	Lady Margaret	1951	Lady Margaret
1952	Lady Margaret	1953	Lady Margaret	1954	Lady Margaret	1955	Jesus	1956	Jesus	1957	Jesus
1958	Jesus	1959	Lady Margaret	1960	Lady Margaret	1961	Lady Margaret	1962	Queens'	1963	Queens'
1964	1st & 3rd Trinity	1965	1st & 3rd Trinity	1966	1st & 3rd Trinity	1967	1st & 3rd Trinity	1968	Queens'	1969	Fitzwilliam
1970	Fitzwilliam	1971	Fitzwilliam	1972	Jesus	1973	1st & 3rd Trinity	1974	Lady Margaret	1975	Lady Margaret
1976	Pembroke	1977	Pembroke	1978	Pembroke	1979	Lady Margaret	1980	Lady Margaret	1981	Lady Margaret
1982	Downing	1983	Lady Margaret	1984	Downing	1985	Pembroke	1986	Pembroke	1987	Caius
1988	Lady Margaret	1989	Lady Margaret	1990	Downing	1991	Downing	1992	Trinity Hall	1993	Trinity Hall
1994	Trinity Hall	1995	Trinity Hall	1996	Downing	1997	Downing	1998	Caius	1999	Caius
2000	Caius	2001	Emmanuel	2002	Caius	2003	Caius	2004	Caius	2005	Caius
2006	Caius	2007	Caius	2008	1st & 3rd Trinity	2009	1st & 3rd Trinity	2010	1st & 3rd Trinity	2011	Caius
2012	Caius	2013	Caius	2014	Caius	2015	Caius	2016	Lady Margaret	2017	Lady Margaret
2018	Lady Margaret	2019	Caius	2020	-	2021	-	2022	Caius	2023	Caius
2024	Lady Margaret	2025	Lady Margaret	2026	Peterhouse						

May Bumps were cancelled between 1915 and 1918, and in 1940 due to war, and in 2020 and 2021 due to the COVID-19 pandemic. Prior to 1946 1st & 3rd Trinity were two separate rowing clubs: 1st Trinity and 3rd Trinity, hence both separate and combined titles.

=== Women's May Bumps (1974–2026) ===
1974	Clare	1975	Newnham	1976	Newnham	1977	New Hall	1978	Churchill	1979	Clare
1980	Clare	1981	New Hall	1982	Trinity Hall	1983	Trinity Hall	1984	New Hall	1985	Churchill
1986	Churchill	1987	Churchill	1988	Jesus	1989	Churchill	1990	Churchill	1991	Lady Margaret
1992	Lady Margaret	1993	Jesus	1994	Jesus	1995	Emmanuel	1996	Emmanuel	1997	Pembroke
1998	Pembroke	1999	Emmanuel	2000	Caius	2001	Caius	2002	Caius	2003	Newnham
2004	Emmanuel	2005	Jesus	2006	Pembroke	2007	Jesus	2008	Pembroke	2009	Pembroke
2010	Pembroke	2011	Downing	2012	Downing	2013	Clare	2014	Downing	2015	Downing
2016	Downing	2017	Jesus	2018	Jesus	2019	Newnham	2020	-	2021	-
2022	Newnham	2023	Jesus	2024	Caius	2025	Jesus	2026	Jesus		

The Women's May Bumps were rowed in coxed fours between 1974 and 1989, changing to coxed eights from 1990 onwards. A new start order was used for the women's 1990 races. May Bumps were cancelled in 2020 and 2021 due to the COVID-19 pandemic. 2024 marks the 50th anniversary of Women's May Bumps, in which Caius took headship.

=== Table of winning boats (1887–2026) ===
Blade	Boat	Head of the River: Men	Head of the River: Women	Head of the River: Total	Winning years: Men	Winning years: Women
Jesus College Boat Club	Jesus	23	10	33	1909, 1910, 1912–14, 1920–22, 1924–25, 1927, 1930, 1935–39, 1947–48, 1955–58, 1972	1988, 1993–94, 2005, 2007, 2017–2018, 2023, 2025, 2026
	Trinity (Combined)	25	-	25	1889, 1893, 1897–1906, 1911, 1919, 1928–29, 1945, 1964–67, 1973, 2008–10	-
Lady Margaret Boat Club	Lady Margaret	22	2	24	1926, 1950–54, 1959–61, 1974–75, 1979–81, 1983, 1988–89, 2016–18, 2024-2025	1991–92
Caius Boat Club	Caius	18	4	22	1987, 1998–2000, 2002–07, 2011–15, 2019, 2022-23	2000–02, 2024
Trinity Hall Boat Club	Trinity Hall	15	2	17	1887–88, 1890–92, 1894–96, 1907–08, 1946, 1992–95	1982–83
Pembroke College Boat Club (Cambridge)	Pembroke	10	6	16	1923, 1931–34, 1976–78, 1985–86	1997–98, 2006, 2008–10
	3rd Trinity	11	n/a	11	1889, 1893, 1901–06, 1929	n/a
Downing College Boat Club	Downing	6	5	11	1982, 1984, 1990–91, 1996–97	2011–12, 2014–16
First and Third Trinity Boat Club	1st & 3rd Trinity	9	-	9	1945, 1964–67, 1973, 2008–10	-
Clare Boat Club	Clare	5	4	9	1941–44, 1949	1974, 1979–1980, 2013
Churchill College Boat Club	Churchill	-	6	6	-	1978, 1985–87, 1989–90
Emmanuel Boat Club	Emmanuel	1	4	5	2001	1995–96, 1999, 2004
	1st Trinity	5	n/a	5	1898–1900, 1911, 1928	n/a
Newnham College Boat Club	Newnham	n/a	5	5	n/a	1975–76, 2003, 2019, 2022
Fitzwilliam College Boat Club	Fitzwilliam	3	-	3	1969–71	-
Murray Edwards Boat Club	New Hall (now Murray Edwards)	n/a	3	3	n/a	1977, 1981, 1984
Queens' College Boat Club	Queens’	3	-	3	1962–63, 1968	-
Peterhouse Boat Club	Peterhouse	1	-	1	2026	-

N.B.: Prior to 1946 1st & 3rd Trinity were two separate rowing clubs: 1st Trinity and 3rd Trinity, hence both separate and combined titles.

Anglia Ruskin, Christ's, Clare Hall, Corpus Christi, Darwin, Girton, Homerton, Hughes Hall, King's, Magdalene, Robinson, St. Catharine's, Selwyn, Sidney Sussex, St Edmund's, Wolfson, Addenbrooke's and the Veterinary School are the regular entrants never to have finished Head of the River for either the men's or women's events.

== Blades, Super-Blades, Technical Blades, and Spoons ==
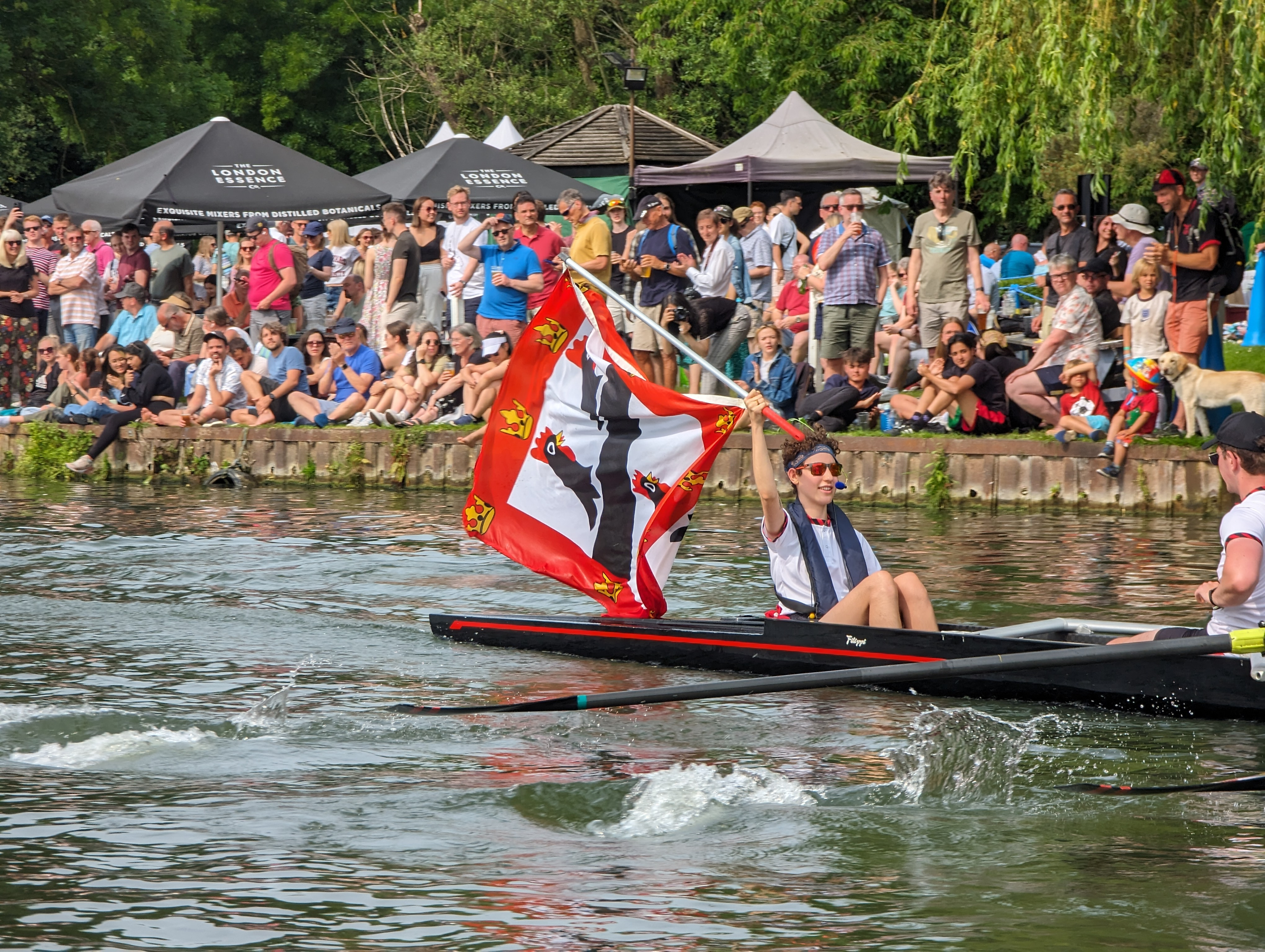
Jesus M2, Saturday Mays 2023 outside the Plough

Four boat 'awards' are informally/formally recognised by the individual college boat clubs that take part in the Cambridge May Bumps, these accolades are awarded as follows:

- Blades: The accolade of earning 'blades' (referring to the rowing oars used by crews) is given to crews that bump up at every opportunity: that is, four bumps on each day in usual circumstances, or five if a crew bumps up to "sandwich" boat. Crews that achieve blades are often given the opportunity to purchase decoratory oars from their college boat club, to serve as a reminder of their contribution to the club's success. For most college rowers, who do not attempt to become University Blues rowers, earning blades is the highest rowing related achievement that can be obtained. Obtaining blades is, for any crew, a rare occurrence, though at each bumps several crews generally "blade". Crews who obtain blades are often photographed and recorded on the walls of the college boathouse to serve as a longer term reminder of their success, and to inspire future generations of college rowers. In the occasion that a crew earns blades, they also earn the right to row back to their college boathouse on the last day of the calendar with their college flag raised high; this practise allows for recognition of the achievement by members of other college boat clubs and the general public watching the races.
- Super-Blades: In the event that a crew bumps up more than four times, including at least one overbump (with no row overs/bumping down) they are said to have earned 'super-blades'. This is rarer because the circumstances leading to the possibility are uncommon.
- Technical Blades: In the case that a crew does not bump up on each opportunity of rowing, but does manage to bump up net four places in the overall standings over the course of the week, with no bumping down, i.e. 'making up' for any row overs with an overbump or successive bumps into a higher division, then they are said to have qualified (at the discretion of the captain at each college boat club) for 'Technical Blades'. Technical bladed rowers are usually afforded the same opportunity to obtain a ceremonial blade as those crews that obtain regular blades.
- Spoons: This 'award' is obtained by crews that are bumped down on every day of the May bumps calendar. The awarding of spoons is an informal occasion by the crew captain, often this captain will actually buy a wooden spoon (decorated) for each crew member as a reminder that "at least they tried".

== The Pegasus Cup ==
Pegasus Cup

The Pegasus Cup is a Cambridge rowing prize first awarded in 2006. It was donated by Milton Brewery and will be awarded annually to the most successful college boat club competing in the Cambridge May Bumping Races. The winner is decided by means of a points system, which is described in the Cambridge University Combined Boat Club handbook as follows:

The Cup is awarded to the Club gaining the most points over the course of the May Bumps. Points are awarded as follows:

- One point for every place gained by each of a Club’s boats.
- One point for each night that a Club retains the Men’s or Women’s Headship in Division One.
- One point deducted for every place lost by each of a Club’s boats.

The total number of points gained over the four days of racing is multiplied by 12 and then divided by the number of boats entered by the Club to give the final score.

To be eligible a club must have at least one men's and one women's boat (except in the case of single sex colleges where two boats of the same sex may be permitted). In the coronavirus year of 2020, May Bumps were not held. Instead, the Pegasus Cup was awarded to the Cambridge college boat club whose members raised the greatest sum for charity (per capita)—Lady Margaret Boat Club, who raised over £3500. The year is asterisked on the Pegasus Cup to distinguish this unusual occurrence.

=== Winners ===
- 2006: Newnham
- 2007: Hughes Hall
- 2008: St Edmund's
- 2009: Hughes Hall
- 2010: Clare Hall
- 2011: Murray Edwards
- 2012: Homerton
- 2013: Churchill
- 2014: Hughes Hall/Lucy Cavendish
- 2015: Churchill
- 2016: Corpus Christi
- 2017: Newnham
- 2018: Wolfson
- 2019: Clare Hall
- 2020*: Lady Margaret
- 2022: Lucy Cavendish
- 2023: Selwyn
- 2024: Homerton
- 2025: St Edmund's

== 2025 finishing positions (2026 starting positions) ==
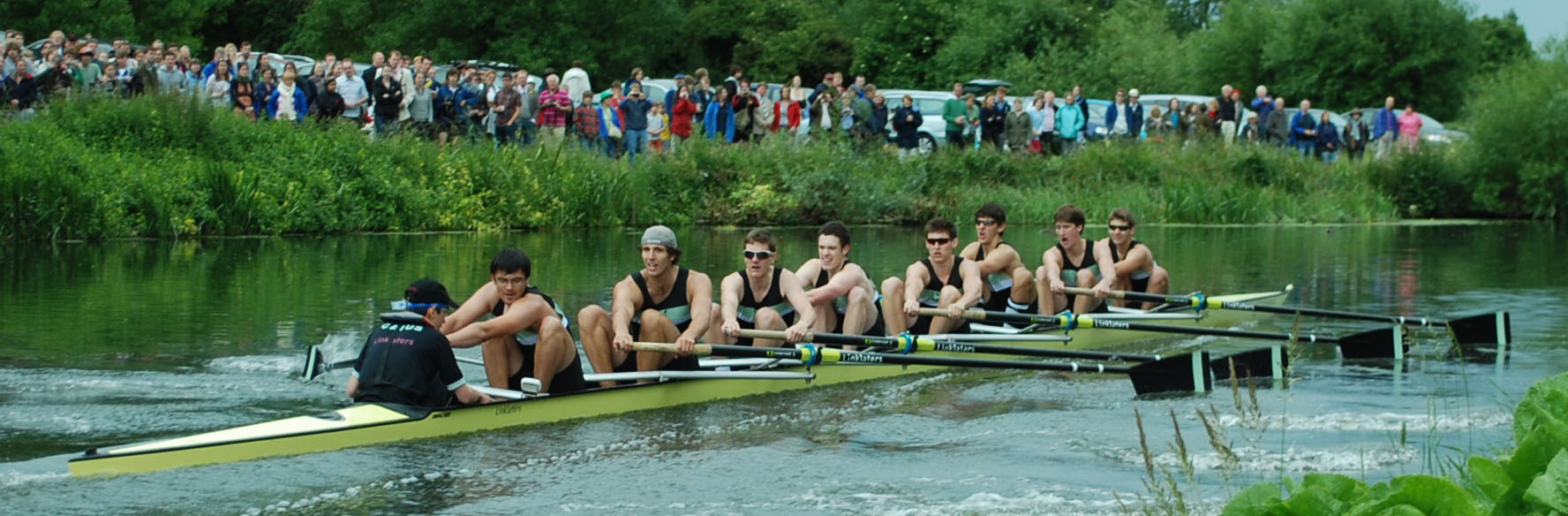
Caius M1 rowing over to claim the men's Headship in 2011.

Results:

=== Men's 1st Division ===
1. Lady Margaret
2. Peterhouse
3. Caius
4. Emmanuel
5. Jesus
6. Magdalene
7. St. Catharine's
8. Downing
9. King's
10. Selwyn
11. Pembroke
12. Queens'
13. Lady Margaret II
14. Clare
15. Fitzwilliam
16. Robinson
17. Hughes Hall

=== Women's 1st Division ===
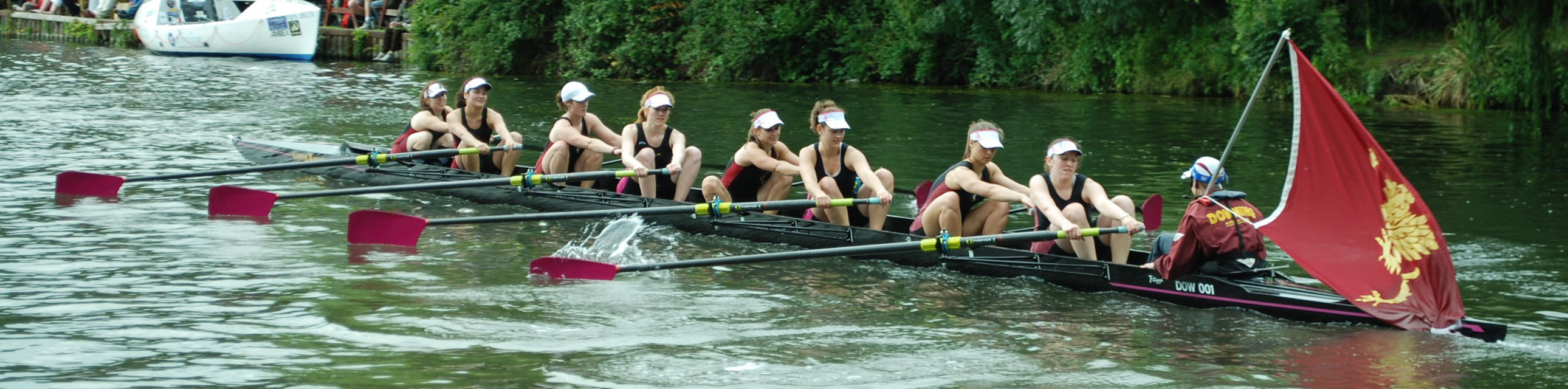
Downing W1 with the Women's Headship in 2011

1. Jesus
2. Trinity Hall
3. Caius
4. Emmanuel
5. Pembroke
6. Lady Margaret
7. Churchill
8. St. Catharine's
9. 1st & 3rd Trinity
10. Downing
11. Newnham
12. Queens'
13. Clare
14. Homerton
15. Magdalene
16. Peterhouse

== See also ==
- Eights Week, the equivalent event at Oxford
- Lent Bumps, the twinned event in Cambridge in late February or early March
- Links to individual May Bumps results
