= Darwin College Boat Club =

British rowing club

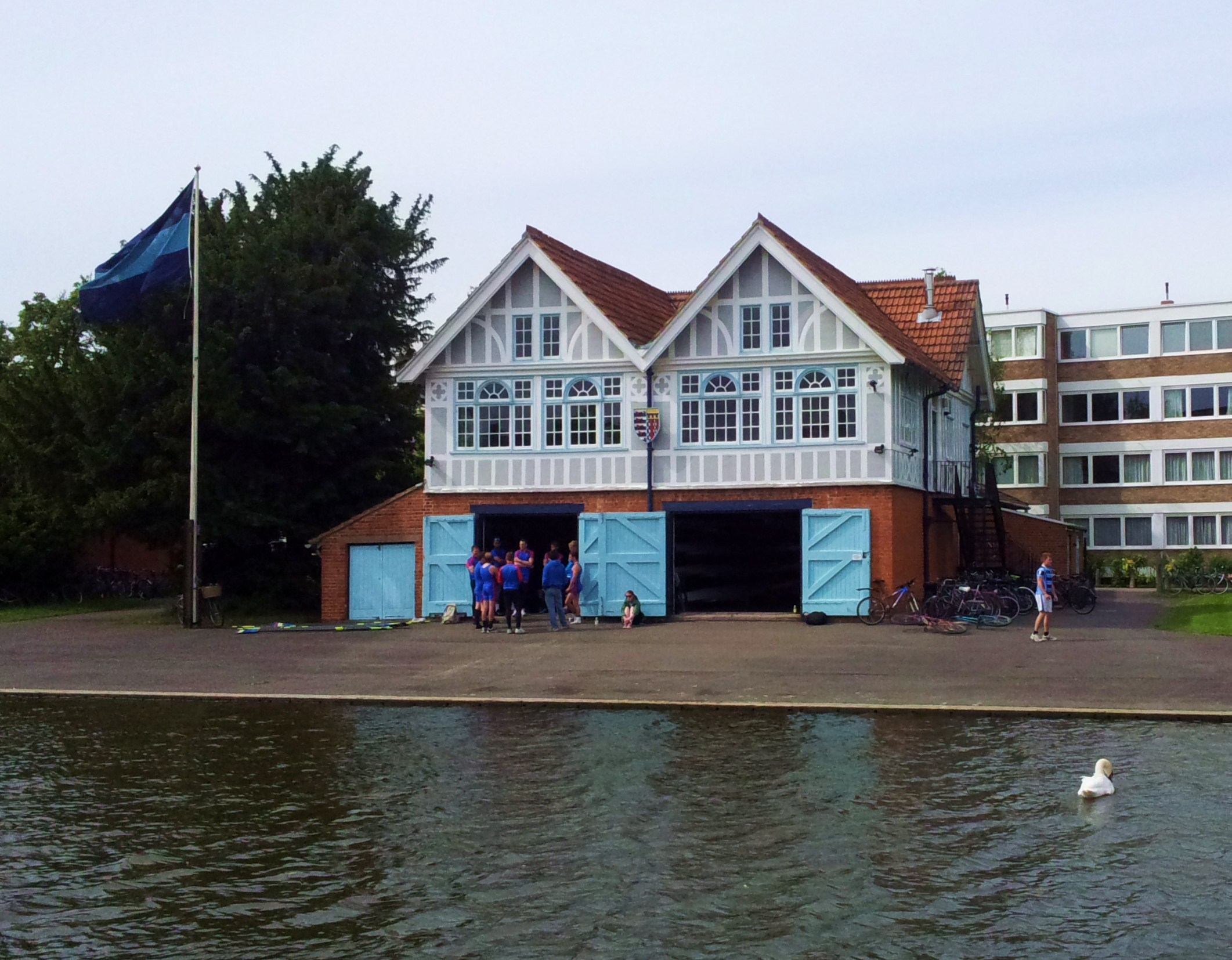

- Location: Cambridge, England
- Coordinates: 52°12′38.31″N 0°8′0.31″E
- Home water: River Cam
- Founded: 1969
- Membership: Darwin College, Cambridge
- Affiliations: British Rowing CUCBC
- Website: www.dar.cam.ac.uk/dcbc

Darwin College Boat Club (DCBC) is the official rowing club for members of Darwin College, Cambridge, a constituent college of the University of Cambridge.

Darwin's blades are Royal Blue and include three vertical stripes, scarlet, Cambridge Blue and yellow based upon the colours of the three colleges that established Darwin College namely St John's College, Cambridge, Gonville & Caius, and Trinity College, Cambridge. The Darwin College Boat Club has a high participation rate and is one of the most popular sports clubs at the college.

== History ==
Darwin College Boat Club was founded in 1969 by the late Dr Chester White. Since then, DCBC has become a successful graduate boat club in Cambridge.

The club competes in the May Bumps and Lent Bumps. Darwin M1 won blades in Lent Bumps 2005 and May Bumps 2014 and in May Bumps 2025. Darwin M2 won blades in May Bumps 2025. Darwin W2 got blades in May Bumps 2006. Darwin M3 won blades in May Bumps 2013. Darwin College currently has 5 boats (3 men's and 2 women's) in May Bumps.

== Boathouse ==
Darwin College Boat Club shares a boat house with Pembroke.

== Honours ==
=== Boat Race representatives ===
The following rowers were part of the rowing club at the time of their participation in The Boat Race.

Women's boat race

Year	Name
2026	Mia Freischem

== Notable alumni ==
Notable Darwin alumni who have participated as rowers for Darwin College Boat Club include Helen McFie, a retired Scottish rower who as a member of the Cambridge University Boat Club won the 1971 and 1972 Boat Races and who competed for Great Britain at the 1975 World Rowing Championships.
