= Homerton College Boat Club =

British rowing club

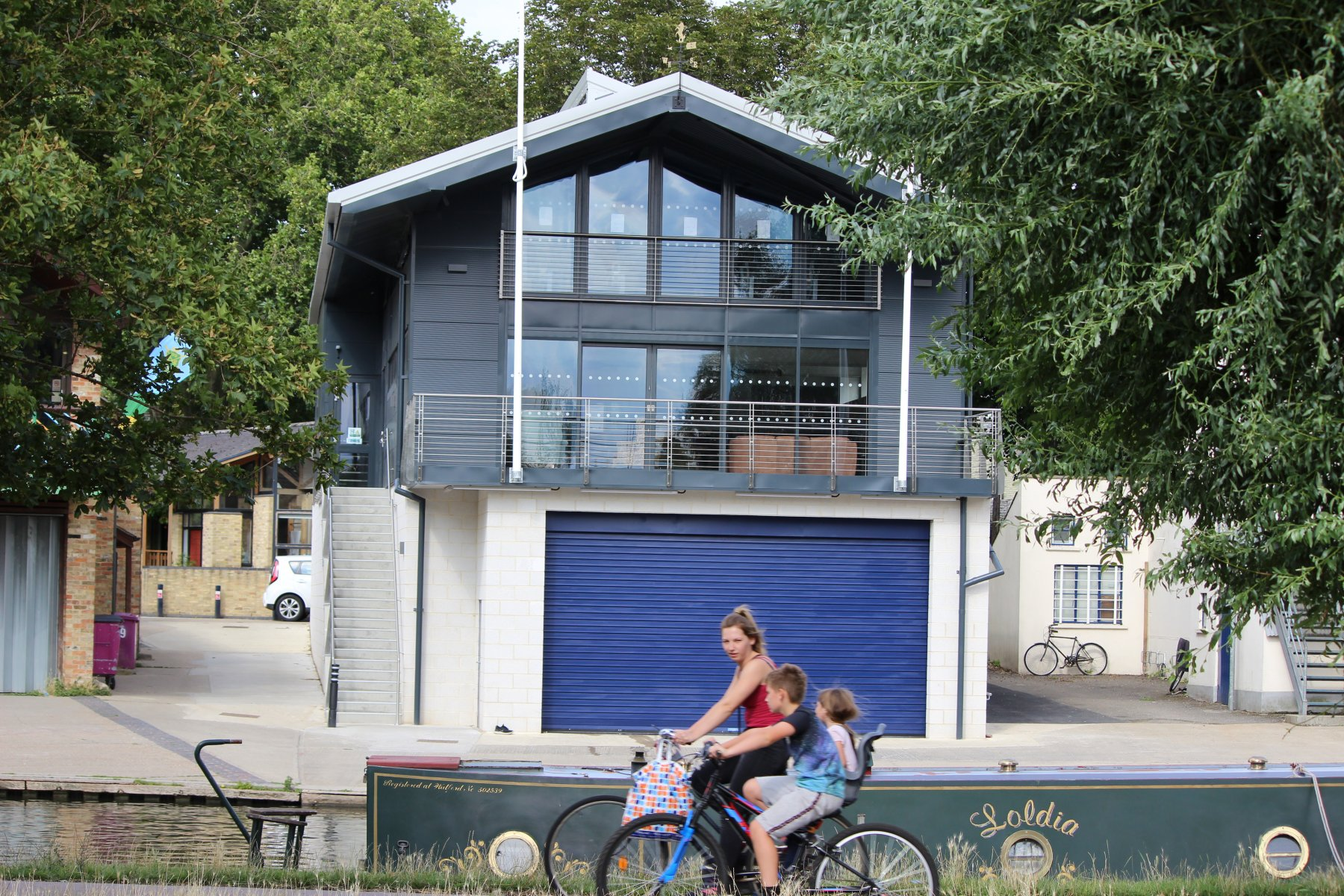

- Location: Cambridge, England
- Coordinates: 52°12′41.28″N 0°7′48.78″E
- Home water: River Cam
- Founded: 1977
- Membership: Homerton College, Cambridge
- Affiliations: British Rowing CUCBC
- Website: homerton.cam.ac.uk/homerton-life/sports/homerton-college-boat-club-hcbc

Homerton College Boat Club (HCBC) is the rowing club for members of Homerton College, University of Cambridge. HCBC colours are navy blue with white trim, and HCBC boats can be identified by white blades with a single navy blue stripe towards the tip of the spoon.

The Club exists to provide the opportunity for all members of Homerton College to row, cox, coach and compete in various rowing events within and outside of Cambridge. The club competes in the May Bumps and Lent Bumps.

== History ==
=== 1978-1992: The Beginnings of HCBC and Consistently High Quality W1 Crews ===
Homerton College Boat Club first competed in the women's Lent and May Bumps in 1978, four years after the women's bumps divisions commenced in the Mays, and two years after women's racing began in the Lents. The first club blades were awarded to W1 and W3 in 1980. The highest position attained to date by either HCBC a Women's or Men's crew was achieved by HCBC Women's 1st VIII (W1) reaching second in the Lents Women's First Division in 1986. In the May Bumps, the highest position attained by either a Women's or Men's crew was 5th, achieved by W1 in the Women's First Division in 1985. Throughout this period of sustained success many Homerton College Boat Club women won University colours in rowing for CUWBC, under the guidance of veteran GB coaches Roger Silk and Ron Needs. During this period no men's crew entered the Lent Bumps, and the men of Homerton competed just twice, in 1981 and 1984, earning the first M1 blades in 1984.

=== 1992-2002: The M1 Surge and Oxbridge Record ===
The Men's crew was truly established in 1992 and started working their way through the lower divisions of both Lent and May bumps. In the space of 10 years, the Men's 1st VIII (M1) boat rose over 3 whole divisions to the top of Division 3 in 2002. This included going up 21 places between 2000 and 2001, moving from P10 in Division 4 to P6 in Division 3 with a run that included 6 bumps (including one as the sandwich boat), an overbump, a double overbump and a triple overbump. As mentioned below, rising 13 places in a single set of bumps racing in 2001 remains an Oxbridge record.

=== 2002-2019: M1 Steadily Climbing to Division 1, and a Resurgent W1 ===
After a few years battling around the top of Division 3, the Men's 1st VIII crew raced twice on the final day of May Bumps 2007, first bumping up in the Division 3 race to move to the head of the Division, and again 90 minutes later, this time starting at the bottom of Division 2 (aka rowing as the 'sandwich boat', a gruelling ask at the best of times). Their second race of the day ended by bumping on Plough Reach in front of the most crowded section of the course, finally bursting through into Division 2 and away from the sandwich boat position for the first time.

Despite the increased level of competition, now racing against mainly other 1st VIIIs, guided by the long-term planning and expert coaching of Sergej Using (also captain of Cambridge 99's Boat Club, Henley Masters medal-winner and ex-pro basketball player) the Men's 1st VIII progressed smoothly through Division 2 over the following few years, winning blades again in 2008 and 2010, and narrowly missing out in 2011 (only going up 3 places). On the final race of the final day May Bumps 2012, again rowing twice in 90 minutes as the sandwich boat and at the end of a grueling week, HCBC M1 bumped Churchill M1 to win their fourth set of blades in 6 years, and with it breaking through into the May Bumps Men's First Division for the first time in the Club's history.

After consistently building the Women's 1st VIII and squad from the end of the 2000s, and a number of hard-fought but unsuccessful battles on the water, W1 results took a significant upswing after the establishment of long term coach Mike Edey and his process-driven approach. Without Lent or May blades since 1981, the W1 earnt May blades in 2015, the first for the crew in 34 years. Lightning often strikes twice, and in 2017, HCBC's Women's 1st VIII, rowing in a brand new Janousek boat named 'Edey' in honour of their coach, W1 went up four places, obtaining blades again and securing their spot in the Women's Mays First Division, the first time that Homerton Women's 1st VIII had been in that position since 2000.

=== 2019-Present: The New Boathouse and Bigger Goals ===
In 2019, HCBC moved into a new boathouse, co-funded by and shared with City of Cambridge Rowing Club, and St Mary's School, Cambridge. The new boathouse is home to 4 dynamic RP3 rowers, 12 C2 rowers and a full weights section and clubroom. The first bumps races with the new boathouse were successful, with M1 going +2 and W1 going +1 in Lents 2020. The new facilities bought about a new mindset for the club, with an aim to enter more external races, and compete nationally with HCBC at Head of the River Race (HoRR) each year. Unfortunately, the 2020 COVID pandemic led to the cancellation of HoRR and Mays 2020. The Lent Bumps 2021 were replaced by a 'virtual' race in which members of each crew had to run 800m and log their times. In the 'virtual Lent Bumps', Homerton M1 won superblades. Mays 2021 was replaced by the June Eights Regatta.

In the first set of bumps races after the pandemic, M1 had a cracking performance, going +6 and earning true 'superblades', with three bumps and an overbump. Homerton M1 was the only first men’s boat to obtain blades in Lents 2022. The 2022 M1 Crew also took Homerton to HoRR for the first time since 2013, and set a precedent such that each year since a Homerton M1 has returned to HoRR. The early 2020s have also seen great success from the lower boats, with M2 earning especially convincing blades in 2023, bumping within 400m each day, and W3 going +9 in 2024, the highest ever climb for a HCBC women's crew. This success from W3 was a key contributor to HCBC's first Pegasus Cup win in 2024 - awarded annually to the most successful college boat club competing in the Cambridge May Bumping Races.

2024 also saw the first ever international trip for Homerton College Boat Club in its history. HCBC combined with St Peter's College Boat Club, Oxford (SPCBC) for form a combined 'Oxbridge' crew to compete in the 8th annual Nanchang International Regatta in China. The event, held on the 15th-19th of August, attracted crews from institutions including the University of Sydney, Yale University, Massachusetts Institute of Technology, and the University of Tokyo, alongside teams from across China. The crews competed in two disciplines: 1000m side-by-side racing as well as a 6000m head race. In both races the combined crew finished a very respectable 4th out of around a dozen crews. The success of 2024 has made the trip to Nanchang a regular fixture of the HCBC calendar, with a full Homerton crew bringing home silver medals in 2025, and the crew returning once more in 2026.

== Blade Winning 1st VIIIs ==
=== Men's VIIIs ===
- M1 Mays 1984
- M1 Mays 1992
- M1 Mays 1997
- M1 Mays 1998
- M1 Mays 2000
- M1 Mays 2001
- M1 Lents 2004
- M1 Mays 2008
- M1 Lents 2009
- M1 Mays 2010
- M1 Lents 2013
- M1 Lents 2022

=== Women's VIIIs ===
- W1 Mays 1980
- W1 Mays 1981
- W1 Lents 1985
- W1 Mays 2005
- W1 Mays 2015
- W1 Mays 2017
- W1 Lents 2024
- W1 Mays 2025

== Record Breakers ==
Oxbridge Record - Most Places Advanced during one Series of Bumps Races (Mays/Lents/Torpids/Eights)

The Homerton College Boat Club Men's 1st VIII hold the Oxbridge record for the most places advanced during one series of bumps (either Mays, Lents, or Torpids/Eights for Oxford), advancing 13 places in the May Bumps 2001 by bumping LMBC IV on day one, and sandwiching up to division 3 by bumping Corpus II, overbumping Sidney II and triple-overbumping 1st & 3rd III the following two days and bumping Selwyn II on the final day to take blades.

World Record

In May 2017, the Club broke the world record for longest continuous row on a Concept2 rowing machine. Members of the club took shifts rowing on the same machine for 4 days 12 hours and 10 minutes, keeping the flywheel spinning constantly through day and night, and supported by friends and fellow Homertonians in full view in the college's Buttery (bar/cafeteria).

== Honours ==
=== Boat Race representatives ===
The following rowers were part of the rowing club at the time of their participation in The Boat Race.

Men's boat race

Year	Name
2011	Mike Thorp
2012	Mike Thorp
2013	Henry Fieldman (cox)
2014	Mike Thorp
2019	Dave Bell

Women's boat race

Year	Name
2015	Daphne Martschenko
2016	Alice Jackson
2017	Claire Lambe
2017	Alice White
2018	Kelsey Barolak
2018	Alice White
2018	Olivia Coffey

=== Other University colours ===
List of known members of University Boat Clubs:

CUBC

- 1996-97: Suzie K. Ellis (cox, Goldie - won)
- 1998-1999: Dan McSherry (spare)
- 1999-2000: Dan McSherry (Goldie)
- 2002: Andreas MacFarlane (triallist)
- 2010: Mike Thorp (Goldie - won)
- 2013: Mike Thorp (Goldie)

CUWBC

- 1991: Francesca Chalmers
- 1992: Jenny Wagstaff, Rachel Crew, Francesca Chalmers (Blondie)
- 1993: Rachel Crew, Emma Wright (Blondie)
- 1994: Anne Rowland
- 1995: Siobhan Cassidy (née McKenna)
- 1996: J Harkins, Anne Rowland, Emma Wilkinson (Blondie)
- 1998: Emma Wylie (Lightweight)
- 1999: Adrienne Ferguson, Emma Wylie (Lightweight)
- 2001: Hannah Cadman (Lightweights), Ruth Pidgeon (cox - Trial 8s)
- 2002: Ulrike Münch-Klever (Spare)
- 2004: Rachael Hanley (Blondie), Catherine Sutherland (Blondie)
- 2011: Anna Beare (Lightweight - won)
- 2013: Alex Courage (Lightweight)
- 2015: Daphne Martschenko (NB - first Women's Tideway Boat Race)
- 2018: Stephanie Payne (Lightweight - won)
- 2020: Morgan Morrison (Lightweight - won)
- 2023: Beth Merrifield (Lightweight)
- 2024: Belle Stevens (Blondie)

CULRC

- 1992: Fiona Pritchard (Cox)
- 2002-03: Dave Pearce (Spare)
- 2005-06: Che Meakins (Granta), Richard Harrington (Spare)
- 2009-10: Chris Bellamy (won)
- 2011: Chris Bellamy (Pres)
- 2023: Gianluca Vartan
- 2024: Gianluca Vartan, Emile Czernuszka

CUCBC Hon. Sec

- 1994-95: Pippa Taylor
- 2002-03: Devin-Paul O'Brien
- 2005-06: Sam Farmer

== Club Kit ==
HCBC Club kit is based on the colours of the Club, blue with white trim. However (in most years) the colours of the Club Zephyr (garment) are reversed, and are white with blue trim. It is traditional to wear a sock of each of the boat club's colours when racing with a blue sock on the foot opposite the rigger.
