= Girton College Boat Club =

British rowing club

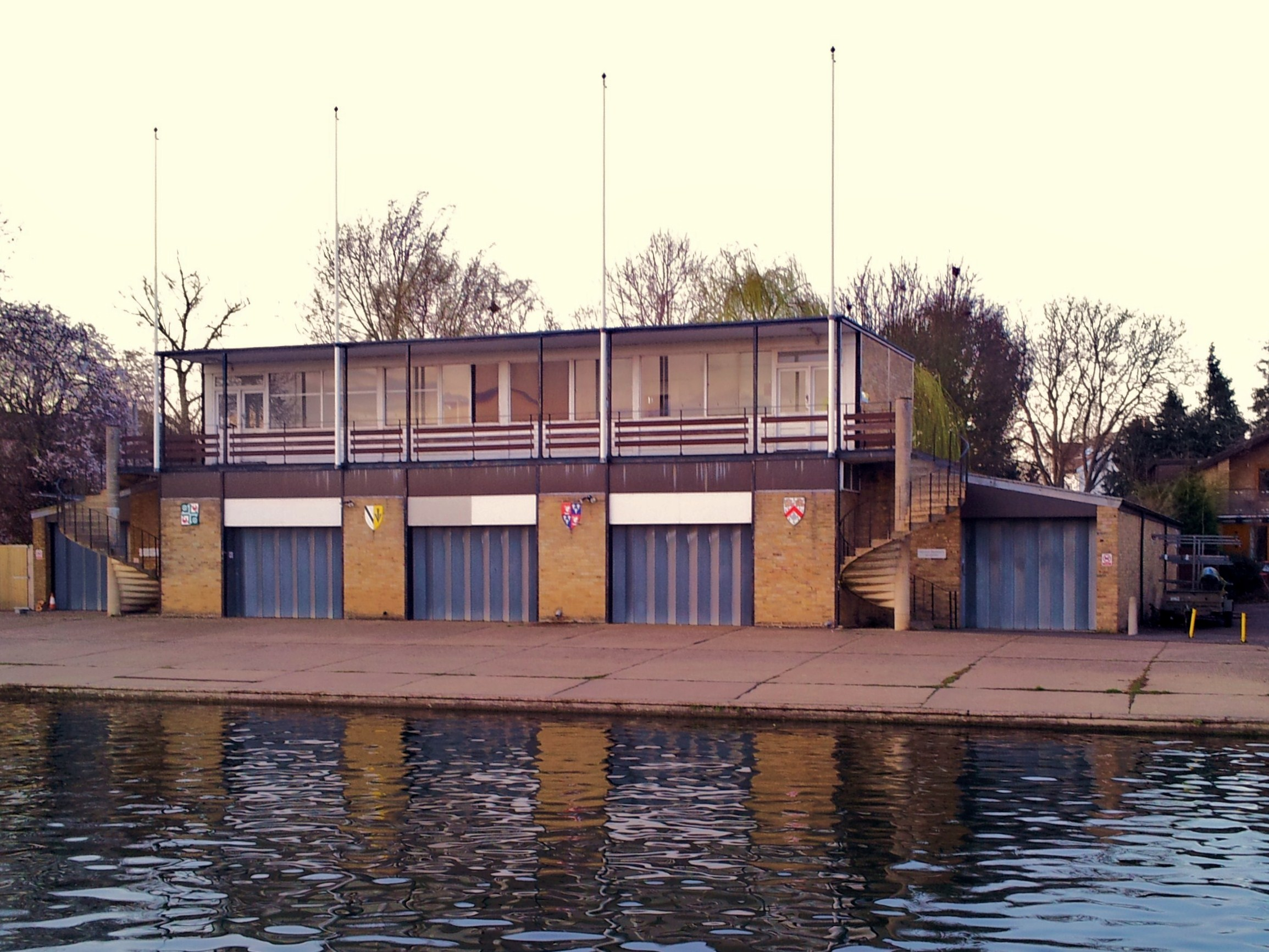

- Location: Cambridge, England
- Coordinates: 52°12′38.9″N 0°7′56.71″E
- Home water: River Cam
- Membership: Girton College, Cambridge
- Affiliations: British Rowing (boat code GIR); CUCBC; Somerville College Boat Club (Sister college)
- Website: gcbc.girton.cam.ac.uk

Girton College Boat Club (or GCBC) is the rowing club for members of Girton College, Cambridge. With origins as a women's boating society founded in 1906, GCBC has now been rowing since 1918 and shares the Old Combined boathouse (built 1958) with the college boat clubs of Sidney Sussex, Wolfson, and Corpus Christi.

== History ==
Girton was originally a college for women only; male undergraduates were first allowed in 1979. The women's 1st VIII team quickly rose to finish 'Head of the River' in the Lent Bumps in 1979 and 1981. Since then, they hovered largely in the bottom half of the 1st division, with a brief period at the top of the second division in the early 2010s.

In the May Bumps, Girton's 1st women rose as high as 3rd in 1979 and 1982, but dropped into the 2nd division by 1994, moving back into the 1st division by 2001.

With male undergraduates first arriving in 1979, a men's crew first appeared in 1980 in both the Lent and May Bumps, rising to the 1st division in the Lent Bumps by 1995. Since then, the men's 1st VIII has remained around the bottom of the 1st division or top of the 2nd division, reaching 9th in 2012. In the May Bumps, the 1st men's VIII took until 1991 to get firmly into the 2nd division; in 2012 they moved into the first division for the first time. Girton are yet to win a division.

In 2014, the women's team returned to the first division of the Lent Bumps and then won blades to move up to 11th in the first division in the Mays. 2014 therefore saw both of Girton's first boats in both the Lent and May first divisions for the first time.

The Red Crescent used by GCBC comes, by way of the college arms, from one of Girton's founders, the Lady Stanley of Alderley, and from her paternal family, the Catholic Anglo-Irish Viscounts Dillon of Costello-Gallen in County Mayo.

== The Infidel BC ==
The Infidel Boat Club (TIBC) is Girton's alumnae boat club. It encourages networking between alumnae who used to row, supports Girton College Boat Club, and promotes rowing within the College and beyond. The Club organises rowing and social events in Cambridge, London and beyond.

== Honours ==
=== Boat Race representatives ===
The following rowers were part of the rowing club at the time of their participation in The Boat Race.

Women's boat race

Year	Name
2021	Sophie Paine
2024	Hannah Murphy
