= Fitzwilliam College Boat Club =

British rowing club

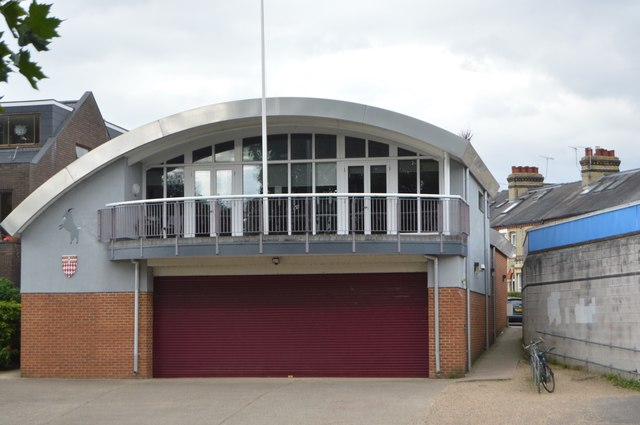

- Location: Cambridge, England
- Home water: River Cam
- Founded: 1880s
- Membership: Fitzwilliam College, Cambridge
- Affiliations: British Rowing, CUCBC
- Website: www.fitzbc.com

Notable members
- Sarah Winckless

Fitzwilliam College Boat Club is the rowing club for members of Fitzwilliam College, Cambridge.

== History ==
Prior to the 1960s, Fitzwilliam House (as it was then called) occupied a position near the bottom of the 2nd division or top half of the 3rd division of the Lent Bumps and May Bumps, even finding itself in the 4th division of the Lent Bumps briefly. Between 1959 and 1969, the 1st men's VIII were not bumped in the Lent Bumps, rising to Head of the River in 1969. Between 1960 and 1971, the 1st men's VIII were bumped only once in the May Bumps, taking the headship for three years between 1969 and 1971. From then until the mid-1980s, the 1st VIII held a position in the top-half of the 1st division and won both the Fairbairn Cup and the Emmanuel Sprints Regatta in the Michaelmas Term of 1982. The 1982 crew completed the traditional (1929–1989) Fairbairn course in 14.34, becoming the second (and last!) crew ever to post a winning time of under 15 minutes over the original race distance.

The women's 1st VIII held a position in the top-half of the 1st division briefly in the 1980s, but fell from 6th to 39th position when the May Bumps were re-organised in 1990, with the introduction of coxed-eights. Between the mid-1980s and mid-1990s, the women fell 20 places in the Lent Bumps. The 1st Men won blades in Lent Bumps 2006. In the May Bumps 2011, the Women's 1st VIII won blades. In 2006 1st Novice Men won the Fairbairns Cup Novice Division. The club repeated this victory in the Novice Division race in 2007 and again in 2009. In 2014, the 2nd Novice Men won the Clare Novices Plate whilst the 1st Novice Men won Emma Sprints. In the Lent Bumps 2015, the 1st Men won superblades, bumping five crews in four days and finishing in the top division. May Bumps 2022 marked a particularly successful campaign for the club, with the 1st Men winning blades and the 1st Women bumping three times finishing 8th on the river, the highest position of Fitz women ever.

The Boat Club is supported by an active dedicated society, The Billygoats, whose membership is open to all who have rowed for Fitzwilliam College Boat Club. The Billygoats, often affectionately referred to as the 'Billyguts' after the typical shape of middle-aged former oarsmen, organises social events at the May Bumps and Henley Royal Regatta as well as raising funds to support the Boat Club.

== Honours ==
=== Henley Royal Regatta ===
Year	Winning crew
1970	Visitors' Challenge Cup

=== Boat Race representatives ===
The following rowers were part of the rowing club at the time of their participation in The Boat Race.

Men's boat race

Year	Name
1967	R. N. Winckless
1968	R. N. Winckless
1968	J. H. Reddaway
1968	C. J. Gill (cox)
1969	R. N. Winckless
1969	T. M. Redfern
1969	C. B. Murtough (cox)
1970	C. M. Lowe
1970	S. N. S. Robertson
1972	S. G. I. Kerruish
1972	J. A. Hart
1975	D. J. T. Kitchin (cox)
1978	A. N. de M. Jelfs
1979	A. N. de M. Jelfs

Year	Name
1981	M. P. Cowie
1986	Ian R. Clarke
1986	C. A. Burton (cox)
1987	Ian R. Clarke
1989	Ian R. Clarke
1992	Dirk E. Bangert
1993	Dirk E. Bangert
1995	Dirk E. Bangert
2001	Colin J. C. Swainson
2012	Moritz Schramm
2021	Quinten Richardson
2026	Sammy Houdaigui (cox)

Women's boat race

Year	Name
2015	Ashton Brown
2016	Ashton Brown
2017	Ashton Brown
2023	Clare Brillon
2026	Aidan Wrenn-Walz
