= Murray Edwards College Boat Club =

British rowing club

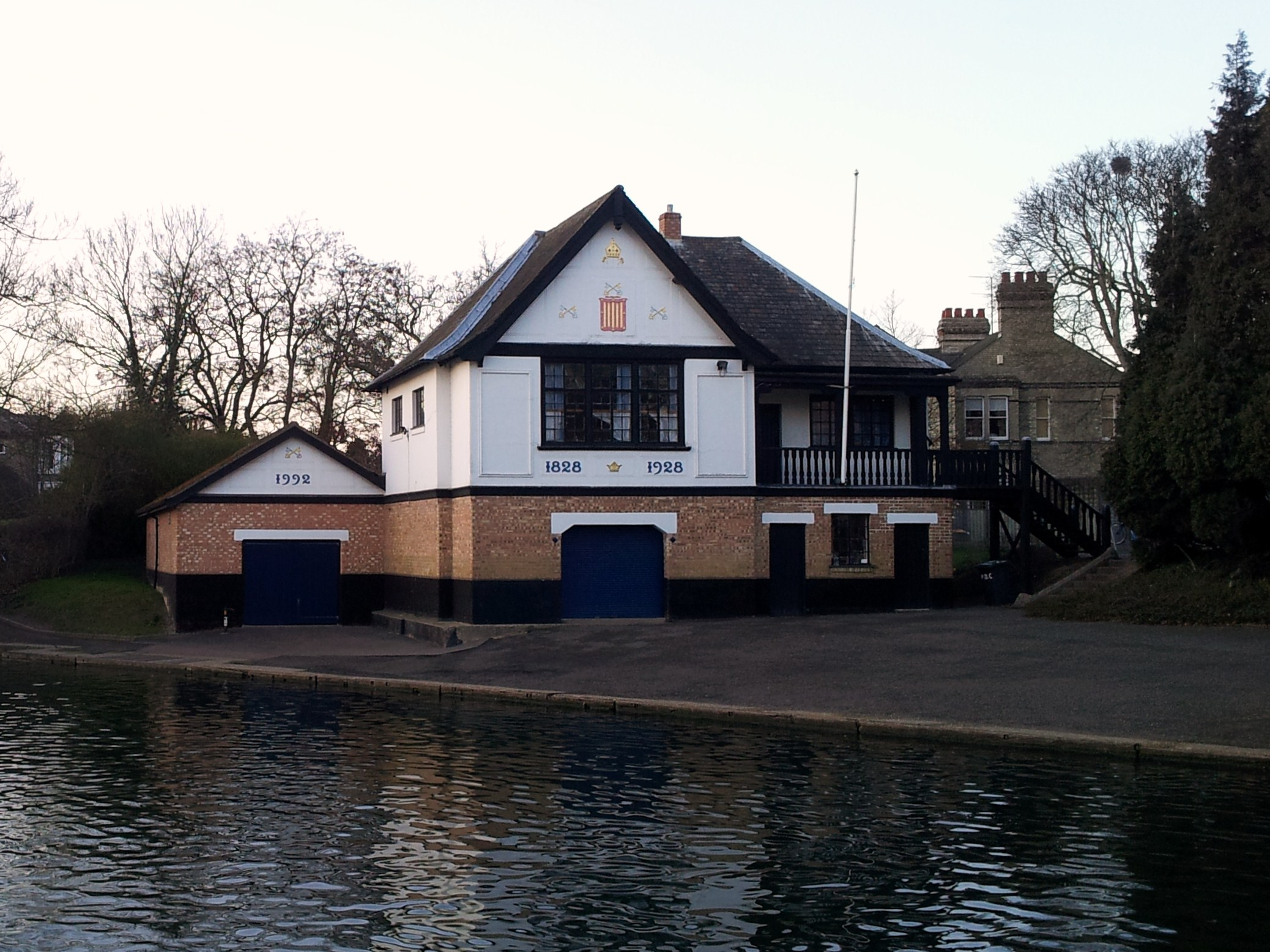

- Location: Cambridge, England
- Coordinates: 52°12′46″N 0°7′42″E
- Home water: River Cam
- Founded: 1974 (as New Hall Boat Club)
- Affiliations: British Rowing CUCBC
- Website: mecbc.soc.srcf.net

Murray Edwards College Boat Club (MECBC) is the rowing club for members of Murray Edwards College, Cambridge, previously known as New Hall. New Hall was founded as a women-only college hence only fields women's crews. The club was founded and known as New Hall Boat Club (NHBC) until 2008, when the club decided to rename itself as Murray Edwards College Boat Club in line with the college name change.

== History ==
New Hall's early progress was good, taking the headship of the Lent Bumps in 1976, 1978 and 1980. A run of poorer results saw the 1st VIII drop into the second division for the first time in 2007. Since then, the club has made a strong come-back, regaining a first division position in Lent Bumps in 2013.

In the May Bumps, initial performance was good, taking the headship in 1977, 1981 and 1984 in the four-oared races, but in 1990, when the start order was re-organised, the New Hall 1st VIII were placed at the bottom of the 1st division and dropped into the 2nd division in 1992. By 1996, New Hall had climbed as high as 10th, but found itself in the 2nd division again by the end of 1998. The New Hall 1st VIII climbed to 10th by 2002, but fell into the 2nd division once again in 2006.

The New Hall 1st VIII won the Novice pennant at the Women’s Head of the River Race in 1989.

Better recruitment, coaching and continuing financial support from the College and alumnae community enabled the Club to build depth and breadth in its crews once more. From 2010 onwards, the 1st VIII had not conceded a Bump in either of the Bumps races, had earned a total of five sets of blades in five years and has been making progress on reclaiming a first division position on the May Bumps charts. Murray Edwards won the Pegasus Cup in 2011 after a solid performance in May Bumps, which secured blades for both its crews.

== Honours ==
=== Boat Race representatives ===
The following rowers were part of the rowing club at the time of their participation in The Boat Race.

Men's boat race

Year	Name
1990	Lisa Ross-Magenty (cox) (New Hall)

Women's boat race

Year	Name
2019	Sophie Deans
2023	Alex Riddell-Webster
