= Wolfson College Boat Club (Cambridge) =

British rowing club

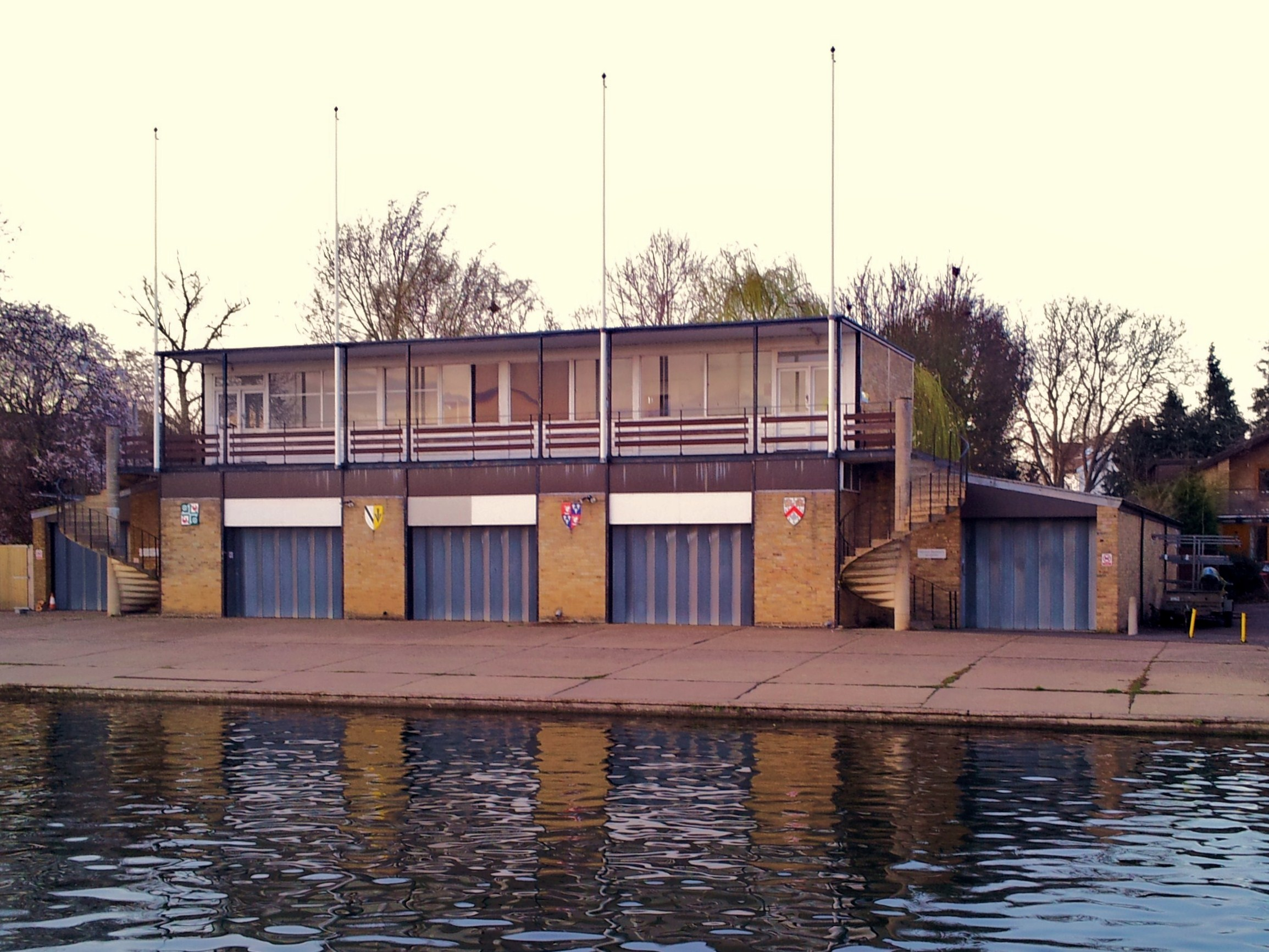

- Location: Cambridge, England
- Coordinates: 52°12′38.9″N 0°7′56.71″E
- Home water: River Cam
- Founded: 1968
- Former names: University College Boat Club
- Affiliations: British Rowing CUCBC
- Website: www.wolfson.cam.ac.uk/current-students/sport/wolfson-college-boat-club

Wolfson College Boat Club (WCBC) is the rowing club for members of Wolfson College, Cambridge. The club was founded in 1968 as University College Boat Club and became Wolfson in 1973 (along with the renaming of the college). The club shares the Old Combined boathouse on the River Cam with the college boat clubs of Corpus Christi, Girton, and Sidney Sussex. For the majority of the decade the club's men's and women's first boats have stood in Division 2 of the May Bumps and Lent Bumps.

== History ==
Starting as a mixed eight (4 men, 4 women), with a female coxswain. This was also the first time the Cam saw a female coxswain or a mixed crew, and caused some uproar on the river. In 1968 the crew made its way through the Getting-On race and into the May Bumps. In the 1969 May Bumps Wolfson claimed blades, managing to move up six positions with an over-bump. The 1970 Lents crew also won blades. In the 1970 Mays Wolfson commanded a sandwich position between the 4th and 5th divisions and was coached by Johan Schreiner - a Norwegian international oarsman.

In the 1971 Lents the club won blades once again.

In 2015 May Bumps, M1 and M2 won blades and in the 2018 May Bumps, M1, W1 and M2 (three out of four crews) won blades, with M1 moving up into division 1 and M2 moving up into division 3. M2's campaign also included a historic double overbump on the first day of the campaign. On the back of this Wolfson became the first club in Cambridge history to win both the Pegasus Cup and the Michell Cup, as well as being the largest club to ever win the Pegasus Cup. This was also the first time Wolfson won either of the cups.

== Honours ==
=== Boat Race representatives ===
The following rowers were part of the rowing club at the time of their participation in The Boat Race.

Year	Name
2017	Aleksander Malowany
2024	Augustus John
2024	Ed Bracey (cox)

== See also ==
- University rowing (UK)
