= Lent Bumps 2013 =

Rowing regatta at the University of Cambridge

The Lent Bumps 2013 was a series of rowing races at Cambridge University from Tuesday 26 February 2013 to Saturday 2 March 2013. The event was run as a bumps race and was the 126th set of races in the series of Lent Bumps which have been held annually in late February or early March since 1887. See Lent Bumps for the format of the races. 121 crews took part (69 men's crews and 52 women's crews), with nearly 1100 participants in total.

== Head of the River crews ==
Caius men rowed over every day, retaining the headship they gained with blades in 2011.

Downing women rowed over every day also retaining the headship they won in 2011.

== Highest 2nd VIIIs ==
Caius II finished up 3 places as the highest placed men's second VIII, bumping Downing II, Fitzwilliam and Emmanuel on the way.

Lady Margaret II finished as the highest placed women's second VIII despite being bumped by Fitzwilliam and swapping places with Girton twice. On the first day Lady Margaret caught Girton but were bumped back by them on day 2. They were bumped again, this time by Fitzwilliam, on day 4 and finished 5th overall in the division.

== Links to races in other years ==
Preceding year	Current year	Following year
Lent Bumps 2012	Lent Bumps 2013	Lent Bumps 2014
May Bumps 2012	May Bumps 2013	May Bumps 2014

== Bumps Charts ==
Below are the bumps charts for all 4 men's and all 3 women's divisions, with the men's event on the left and women's event on the right. The bumps chart shows the progress of every crew over all four days of the racing. To follow the progress of any particular crew, find the crew's name on the left side of the chart and follow the line to the end-of-the-week finishing position on the right of the chart.

This chart may not be displayed correctly if you are using a large font size on your browser. A simple way to check is to see that the first horizontal bold line, marking the boundary between divisions, lies between positions 17 and 18.

Pos	Crew	Men's Bumps Chart	Crew	Pos	Crew	Women's Bumps Chart	Crew	Pos
1	Caius		Caius	1	Downing		Downing	1
2	Downing		Downing	2	Emmanuel		1st & 3rd Trinity	2
3	Lady Margaret		Queens'	3	1st & 3rd Trinity		Jesus	3
4	Queens'		1st & 3rd Trinity	4	Pembroke		Emmanuel	4
5	1st & 3rd Trinity		Jesus	5	Jesus		Christ's	5
6	Jesus		Lady Margaret	6	Clare		Pembroke	6
7	Peterhouse		Peterhouse	7	Christ's		Newnham	7
8	Pembroke		Pembroke	8	Caius		Caius	8
9	Girton		Christ's	9	Queens'		Clare	9
10	Trinity Hall		Girton	10	Newnham		St. Catharine's	10
11	Christ's		Clare	11	St. Catharine's		Queens'	11
12	Clare		Trinity Hall	12	Trinity Hall		King's	12
13	Robinson		St. Catharine's	13	Lady Margaret		Lady Margaret	13
14	Magdalene		King's	14	King's		Murray Edwards	14
15	Emmanuel		Robinson	15	Magdalene		Trinity Hall	15
16	St. Catharine's		Selwyn	16	Peterhouse		Peterhouse	16
17	Selwyn		Magdalene	17	Selwyn		Churchill	17
18	King's		Caius II	18	Murray Edwards		Selwyn	18
19	Downing II		Emmanuel	19	Churchill		Magdalene	19
20	Fitzwilliam		Fitzwilliam	20	Girton		Girton	20
21	Caius II		Churchill	21	Lady Margaret II		Fitzwilliam	21
22	Churchill		Downing II	22	Emmanuel II		Lady Margaret II	22
23	Lady Margaret II		Homerton	23	Sidney Sussex		Homerton	23
24	1st & 3rd Trinity II		1st & 3rd Trinity II	24	Robinson		Emmanuel II	24
25	Sidney Sussex		Jesus II	25	Fitzwilliam		Christ's II	25
26	Jesus II		Lady Margaret II	26	Homerton		Sidney Sussex	26
27	Homerton		Queens' II	27	Hughes Hall		Jesus II	27
28	Pembroke II		Sidney Sussex	28	1st & 3rd Trinity II		Hughes Hall	28
29	Christ's II		Christ's II	29	Jesus II		Newnham II	29
30	Wolfson		Wolfson	30	Christ's II		Robinson	30
31	Queens' II		Pembroke II	31	Pembroke II		1st & 3rd Trinity II	31
32	Corpus Christi		Darwin	32	Newnham II		Pembroke II	32
33	Emmanuel II		Corpus Christi	33	Caius II		Downing II	33
34	Darwin		Hughes Hall	34	St Edmund's		St Edmund's	34
35	Peterhouse II		Emmanuel II	35	Downing II		Darwin	35
36	Selwyn II		St Edmund's	36	Clare II		Caius II	36
37	St Edmund's		Peterhouse II	37	Trinity Hall II		Peterhouse II	37
38	Magdalene II		Selwyn II	38	Darwin		Murray Edwards II	38
39	Clare II		Clare II	39	Wolfson		Clare II	39
40	Trinity Hall II		St. Catharine's II	40	Peterhouse II		Wolfson	40
41	Hughes Hall		Trinity Hall II	41	Sidney Sussex II		Trinity Hall II	41
42	Churchill II		Churchill II	42	Murray Edwards II		Homerton II	42
43	St. Catharine's II		Magdalene II	43	Clare Hall		Clare Hall	43
44	1st & 3rd Trinity III		Jesus III	44	St. Catharine's II		Sidney Sussex II	44
45	Girton II		1st & 3rd Trinity III	45	Emmanuel III		Emmanuel III	45
46	King's II		Caius III	46	Churchill II		Churchill II	46
47	Lady Margaret III		King's II	47	Homerton II		King's II	47
48	Jesus III		Queens' III	48	Murray Edwards III		Queens' II	48
49	Caius III		Girton II	49	King's II		St. Catharine's II	49
50	Robinson II		Clare Hall	50	Downing II		Darwin II	50
51	Clare Hall		Robinson II	51	Queens' II		Murray Edwards III	51
52	Queens' III		Lady Margaret III	52	Queens' III		Queens' III	52
53	Fitzwilliam II		Fitzwilliam II	53				
54	Christ's III		Emmanuel III	54				
55	Emmanuel III		Hughes Hall II	55				
56	Homerton II		Christ's III	56				
57	Hughes Hall II		Homerton II	57				
58	Queens' IV		Queens' IV	58				
59	Corpus Christi II		Corpus Christi II	59				
60	Selwyn III		Darwin II	60				
61	Emmanuel IV		Selwyn III	61				
62	Darwin II		Emmanuel IV	62				
63	Churchill III		Clare III	63				
64	Magdalene III		Churchill III	64				
65	Clare III		St. Catharine's III	65				
66	1st & 3rd Trinity IV		1st & 3rd Trinity IV	66				
67	St. Catharine's III		Magdalene III	67				
68	Churchill IV		Sidney Sussex II	68				
69	Sidney Sussex II		Churchill IV	69				

== The Getting-on Race ==
The Getting-on Race allows a number of crews which did not already have a place from last year's races to compete for the right to race this year.

The 2012 Lent Bumps Getting-on Race took place on 24 February 2012.

=== Competing crews ===
==== Men ====
30 men's crews raced for 15 available spaces at the bottom of the 4th division. The following were successful and rowed in the bumps.

- Christ's III
- Emmanuel III
- Homerton II
- Hughes Hall II
- Queens' IV
- Corpus Christi II
- Selwyn III
- Emmanuel IV
- Darwin II
- Churchill III
- Magdalene III
- Clare III
- 1st & 3rd Trinity IV
- St. Catharine's III
- Churchill IV

The following were unsuccessful.

- Sidney Sussex II
- Queens' VI
- King's III
- Downing III
- Jesus IV
- 1st & 3rd Trinity V
- Homerton III
- St. Catharine's IV
- Trinity Hall III
- Robinson III
- Darwin III
- Fitzwilliam III
- 1st & 3rd Trinity VI
- Queens' V
- St Edmund's II

==== Women ====
22 women's crews raced for 11 available spaces at the bottom of the 3rd division. The following were successful and rowed in the bumps. The combined Hughes Hall/Lucy Cavendish women's crew is listed as Lucy Cavendish only.

- Sidney Sussex II
- Murray Edwards II
- St. Catharine's II
- Emmanuel III
- Churchill II
- Homerton II
- Murray Edwards III
- King's II
- Darwin II
- Queens' II
- Queens' III

The following were unsuccessful.

- Newnham III
- Magdalene II
- Selwyn II
- Newnham IV
- Peterhouse III
- Girton II
- Lucy Cavendish II
- Queens' IV
- Pembroke III
- King's III
- Corpus Christi I
