= May Bumps 2012 =

Rowing races at Cambridge University

The May Bumps 2012 were a set of rowing races held in Cambridge, UK with crews from the boat clubs of all Cambridge University Colleges and Anglia Ruskin University from Wednesday 13 June 2012 to Saturday 16 June 2012. The event was run as a bumps race and was the 121st set of races in the series of May Bumps which have been held annually in mid-June in this form since 1887. In 2012, 172 crews took part (103 men's crews and 69 women's crews), with nearly 1550 participants in total.

The timing of the lower divisions on the Saturday was disrupted by a protest on the river and its tow-path by animal rights activists objecting to the removal from the area of an infamous swan, the so-called Mr. Asbo, that had been attacking rowers. Three people were arrested for breaching the peace.

== Head of the River crews ==
Caius Boat Club

Caius men rowed over well clear of Downing men each day to win their blades and retain the headship they won 2011. As they came also first at the Lent Bumps 2012 they hold the double Headship. They also won both bumps events in 2011.

Downing Boat Club

Downing women rowed-over on each day to hold onto the Head of the River title and win their blades. By winning the Mays they also retain the double Headship having won Lent Bumps 2012. This also their second double headship, having won both bumps events in 2011.

Consecutive double Headships, i.e. that the same Men's and Women's crews have won both the Lent and May Bumps for consecutive years, illustrate how dominant these crews have been on the River Cam. Caius men have now won 11 of the 15 May Bumps from 1998 (and 8 of the Lent Bumps), whilst Downing men's and women's 1st VIIIs have been either 1st (head) or second on the river in Lents or Mays for at least the last 2 years (and up to 6 in the case of the Men in Lents).

== Highest 2nd VIIIs ==
Downing II held the position of highest men's 2nd VIII despite being bumped successively by Girton, Homerton and Peterhouse.

Pembroke II remained the highest women's 2nd VIII despite falling to 22nd due to bumps from Murray Edwards and Sidney Sussex.

== Pegasus Cup and the Biggest Risers ==
Homerton won the Pegasus cup for the first time, narrowly beating Murray Edwards in their attempt to hold the title. Homerton boats collectively managing 15 bumps moving up 18 places in total. The Men's 1st VIII entered division 1 and two of the club's five boats won blades.

Darwin III rose an impressive 8 places, triple over-bumping Sidney Sussex IV and bumping Downing IV, who themselves fell 7 places over the 4 days.

== Links to races in other years ==
Preceding year	Current year	Following year
May Bumps 2011	May Bumps 2012	May Bumps 2013
Lent Bumps 2011	Lent Bumps 2012	Lent Bumps 2013

== Bumps Charts ==
Below are the bumps charts all 6 men's and all 4 women's divisions, with the men's event on the left and women's event on the right. The bumps chart represents the progress of every crew over all four days of the racing. To follow the progress of any particular crew, simply find the crew's name on the left side of the chart and follow the line to the end-of-the-week finishing position on the right of the chart.

Note that this chart may not be displayed correctly if you are using a large font size on your browser. A simple way to check is to see that the first horizontal bold line, marking the boundary between divisions, lies between positions 17 and 18. The combined Hughes Hall/Lucy Cavendish women's crews are listed as Lucy Cavendish only.

Pos	Crew	Men's Bumps Chart	Crew	Pos	Crew	Women's Bumps Chart	Crew
1	Caius		Caius	1	Downing		Downing
2	Downing		Downing	2	Pembroke		Jesus
3	St. Catharine's		Jesus	3	Christ's		Newnham
4	1st & 3rd Trinity		Lady Margaret	4	Newnham		Pembroke
5	Pembroke		1st & 3rd Trinity	5	Emmanuel		Clare
6	Jesus		St. Catharine's	6	Jesus		Emmanuel
7	Lady Margaret		Pembroke	7	Clare		Christ's
8	Queens'		Queens'	8	Lady Margaret		Caius
9	Fitzwilliam		Clare	9	Queens'		1st & 3rd Trinity
10	Magdalene		Fitzwilliam	10	Caius		Queens'
11	Clare		Christ's	11	Trinity Hall		Trinity Hall
12	Trinity Hall		Emmanuel	12	1st & 3rd Trinity		Lady Margaret
13	Emmanuel		King's	13	Magdalene		Girton
14	Christ's		Magdalene	14	St. Catharine's		St. Catharine's
15	Churchill		Girton	15	Churchill		Selwyn
16	King's		Trinity Hall	16	Girton		Magdalene
17	Robinson		Homerton	17	Selwyn		Peterhouse
18	Downing II		Churchill	18	Peterhouse		King's
19	1st & 3rd Trinity II		Robinson	19	King's		Churchill
20	Girton		Peterhouse	20	Pembroke II		Murray Edwards
21	Homerton		Downing II	21	Sidney Sussex		Sidney Sussex
22	Peterhouse		Selwyn	22	Emmanuel II		Pembroke II
23	Lady Margaret II		1st & 3rd Trinity II	23	Murray Edwards		Fitzwilliam
24	Selwyn		Lady Margaret II	24	Jesus II		Robinson
25	Caius II		Caius II	25	Fitzwilliam		Emmanuel II
26	Jesus II		St Edmund's	26	Robinson		Homerton
27	St Edmund's		Jesus II	27	Newnham II		Darwin
28	Sidney Sussex		Sidney Sussex	28	Anglia Ruskin		Jesus II
29	Wolfson		Pembroke II	29	Homerton		Lady Margaret II
30	Pembroke II		Christ's II	30	Darwin		Newnham II
31	Anglia Ruskin		Wolfson	31	Clare II		Downing II
32	Corpus Christi		Queens' II	32	Lady Margaret II		Anglia Ruskin
33	Darwin		Corpus Christi	33	Lucy Cavendish		Clare II
34	Christ's II		Clare II	34	Downing II		Caius II
35	Queens' II		Anglia Ruskin	35	Trinity Hall II		Lucy Cavendish
36	Clare II		Hughes Hall	36	Corpus Christi		Wolfson
37	St. Catharine's II		Darwin	37	Wolfson		Christ's II
38	Emmanuel II		1st & 3rd Trinity III	38	Caius II		Trinity Hall II
39	Hughes Hall		Selwyn II	39	Christ's II		Queens' II
40	Selwyn II		Emmanuel II	40	Queens' II		Corpus Christi
41	Peterhouse II		St. Catharine's II	41	Girton II		Pembroke III
42	Lady Margaret III		Peterhouse II	42	Magdalene II		Selwyn II
43	Robinson II		Lady Margaret III	43	Selwyn II		St. Catharine's II
44	1st & 3rd Trinity III		Robinson II	44	Pembroke III		Girton III
45	Trinity Hall II		Girton II	45	St. Catharine's II		1st & 3rd Trinity II
46	Magdalene II		Trinity Hall II	46	1st & 3rd Trinity II		Magdalene II
47	Fitzwilliam II		Magdalene II	47	Emmanuel III		Murray Edwards II
48	Churchill II		Fitzwilliam II	48	Clare Hall		Newnham III
49	Girton II		Queens' III	49	Newnham III		Emmanuel III
50	Emmanuel III		Emmanuel III	50	Murray Edwards II		Clare Hall
51	King's II		King's II	51	St Edmund's		Christ's III
52	Caius III		Churchill II	52	Sidney Sussex II		Sidney Sussex II
53	Queens' III		Caius III	53	Jesus III		Homerton II
54	Pembroke III		Downing III	54	Homerton II		Fitzwilliam II
55	Wolfson II		Pembroke III	55	Darwin II		St Edmund's
56	Clare Hall		Clare III	56	Christ's III		Peterhouse II
57	Downing III		Clare Hall	57	Fitzwilliam II		Jesus III
58	Darwin II		Wolfson II	58	Lucy Cavendish II		King's II
59	Jesus III		Darwin II	59	Peterhouse II		Darwin II
60	Clare III		Selwyn III	60	King's II		Lucy Cavendish II
61	Selwyn III		Jesus III	61	Selwyn III		Queens' III
62	St. Catharine's III		St. Catharine's III	62	Queens' III		Murray Edwards III
63	Trinity Hall III		Christ's III	63	Pembroke IV		Selwyn III
64	St Edmund's II		Trinity Hall III	64	Clare III		Lady Margaret III
65	1st & 3rd Trinity IV		1st & 3rd Trinity IV	65	Trinity Hall III		Pembroke IV
66	Jesus IV		Corpus Christi II	66	Murray Edwards III		Trinity Hall III
67	Christ's III		Homerton II	67	Robinson II		Clare III
68	Corpus Christi II		St Edmund's II	68	Lady Margaret III		Robinson II
69	Magdalene III		Christ's IV	69	Sidney Sussex III		Sidney Sussex III
70	Lady Margaret IV		Jesus IV				
71	Homerton II		Hughes Hall II				
72	Christ's IV		Magdalene III				
73	Sidney Sussex II		1st & 3rd Trinity V				
74	Pembroke IV		Lady Margaret IV				
75	Hughes Hall II		Sidney Sussex II				
76	1st & 3rd Trinity V		King's III				
77	Robinson III		Pembroke IV				
78	Sidney Sussex III		Queens' IV				
79	Caius IV		Robinson III				
80	King's III		Girton III				
81	Jesus V		Sidney Sussex III				
82	Queens' IV		Magdalene IV				
83	Girton III		Caius IV				
84	Fitzwilliam III		Jesus V				
85	Lady Margaret V		Clare IV				
86	Christ's V		Lady Margaret V				
87	Magdalene IV		Fitzwilliam III				
88	Downing IV		Queens' V				
89	Emmanuel IV		Emmanuel IV				
90	Clare IV		Corpus Christi III				
91	Corpus Christi III		Christ's V				
92	Girton IV		Homerton III				
93	Selwyn IV		Selwyn IV				
94	Queens' V		Darwin III				
95	Sidney Sussex IV		Downing IV				
96	Clare V		Queens' VI				
97	Robinson IV		Girton IV				
98	Homerton III		1st & 3rd Trinity VI				
99	Queens' VI		Clare V				
100	Emmanuel V		Emmanuel V				
101	1st & 3rd Trinity VI		Robinson IV				
102	Darwin III		Corpus Christi IV				
103	Corpus Christi IV		Sidney Sussex IV				

== The Getting-on Race ==
The Getting-on Race (GoR) allows a number of crews which did not already have a place from last year's races to compete for the right to race this year. Up to ten crews are removed from the bottom of last year's finishing order, who must then race alongside new entrants to decide which crews gain a place.

The 2012 May Bumps Getting-on Race took place on 8 June 2012.

=== Competing crews ===
==== Men ====
12 men's crews competed for 8 available spaces at the bottom of the 6th division.

- Clare V
- Robinson IV
- Homerton III
- Queens' VI
- Emmanuel V
- 1st & 3rd Trinity VI
- Darwin III
- Corpus Christi IV

The following were unsuccessful.

- 1st & 3rd Trinity VII
- Robinson V
- Clare VI

The following did not race.

- Anglia Ruskin II

==== Women ====
11 women's crews competed for 6 available spaces at the bottom of the 4th division.

- Clare III
- Trinity Hall III
- Murray Edwards III
- Robinson II
- Lady Margaret III
- Sidney Sussex III

The following were unsuccessful.

- Girton III
- Trinity Hall IV

The following did not race.

- Anglia Ruskin II
- King's III
- Jesus IV
