= Lent Bumps 2012 =

Rowing races at Cambridge University

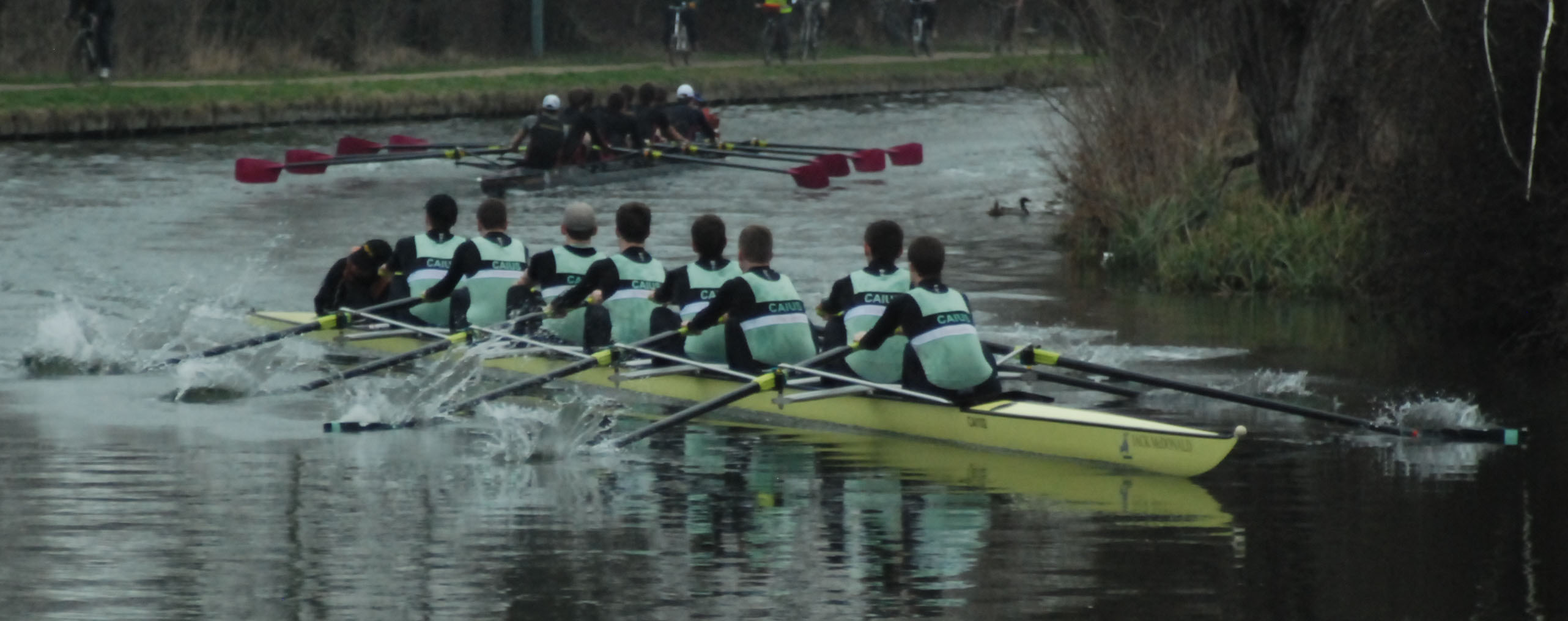
Caius M1

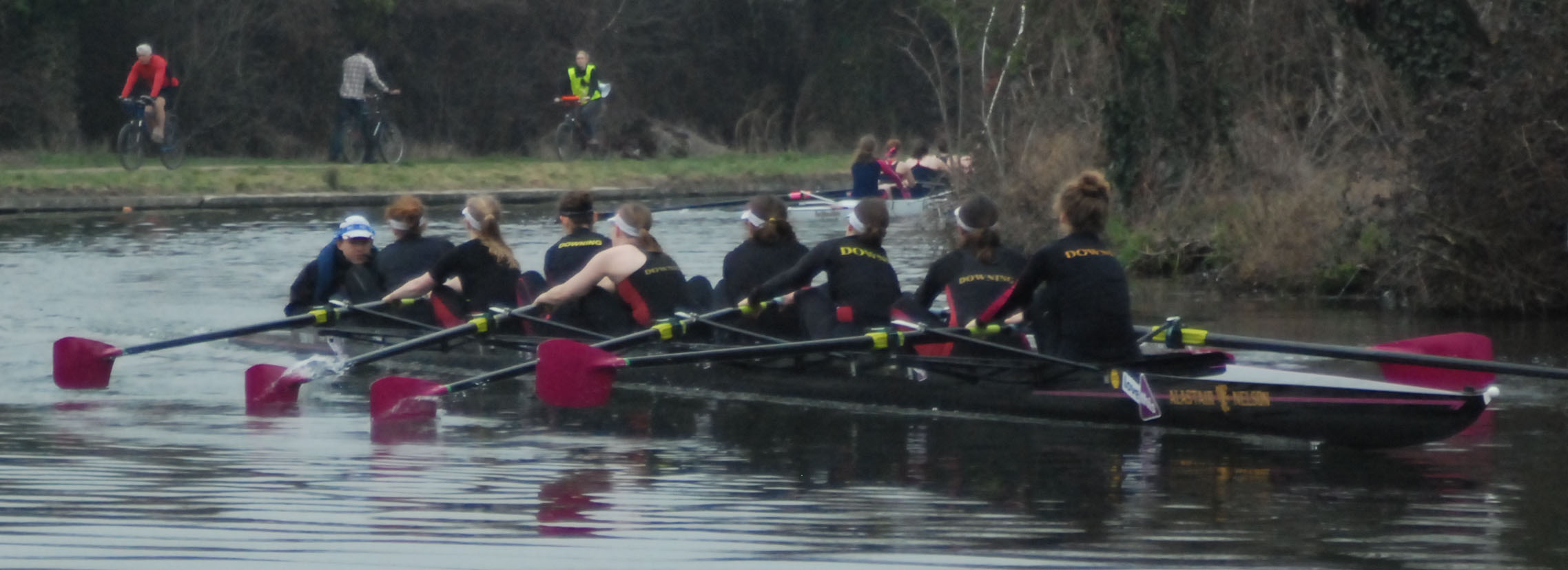
Downing W1

The Lent Bumps 2012 was a series of rowing races at Cambridge University from Tuesday 28 February 2012 to Saturday 3 March 2012. The event was run as a bumps race and was the 125th set of races in the series of Lent Bumps which have been held annually in late February or early March since 1887. See Lent Bumps for the format of the races. 121 crews took part (69 men's crews and 52 women's crews), with nearly 1100 participants in total.

== Head of the River crews ==
Caius men rowed over every day, retaining the headship they gained with blades in 2011.

Downing women rowed over every day also retaining the headship they won the previous year.

== Highest 2nd VIIIs ==
Downing II finished up 4 places as the highest placed men's second VIII, winning their blades and bumping 1st & 3rd Trinity II and Caius II on the way.

Lady Margaret II finished as the highest placed women's second VIII after a repeated battle with Emmanuel II, switching places 3 times over the 4 days. On the first day, Lady Margaret caught Emmanuel quickly but were bumped back on the second day after catching a crab. They regained the place on the third day however, and proceeded to row over on the fourth to obtain the title.

== Links to races in other years ==
Preceding year	Current year	Following year
Lent Bumps 2011	Lent Bumps 2012	Lent Bumps 2013
May Bumps 2011	May Bumps 2012	May Bumps 2013

== Bumps Charts ==
Below are the bumps charts for all 4 men's and all 3 women's divisions, with the men's event on the left and women's event on the right. The bumps chart shows the progress of every crew over all four days of the racing. To follow the progress of any particular crew, find the crew's name on the left side of the chart and follow the line to the end-of-the-week finishing position on the right of the chart.

This chart may not be displayed correctly if you are using a large font size on your browser. A simple way to check is to see that the first horizontal bold line, marking the boundary between divisions, lies between positions 17 and 18.

The combined Hughes Hall/Lucy Cavendish women's crews are listed as Lucy Cavendish only.

Pos	Crew	Men's Bumps Chart	Crew	Pos	Crew	Women's Bumps Chart	Crew	Pos
1	Caius		Caius	1	Downing		Downing	1
2	Downing		Downing	2	Pembroke		Emmanuel	2
3	1st & 3rd Trinity		Lady Margaret	3	Emmanuel		1st & 3rd Trinity	3
4	Lady Margaret		Queens'	4	1st & 3rd Trinity		Pembroke	4
5	Queens'		1st & 3rd Trinity	5	Queens'		Jesus	5
6	Pembroke		Jesus	6	Christ's		Clare	6
7	Trinity Hall		Peterhouse	7	Jesus		Christ's	7
8	Jesus		Pembroke	8	Trinity Hall		Caius	8
9	Peterhouse		Girton	9	Clare		Queens'	9
10	Clare		Trinity Hall	10	Caius		Newnham	10
11	Magdalene		Christ's	11	Newnham		St. Catharine's	11
12	Emmanuel		Clare	12	Lady Margaret		Trinity Hall	12
13	Girton		Robinson	13	Magdalene		Lady Margaret	13
14	King's		Magdalene	14	St. Catharine's		King's	14
15	Christ's		Emmanuel	15	Selwyn		Magdalene	15
16	Fitzwilliam		St. Catharine's	16	King's		Peterhouse	16
17	Robinson		Selwyn	17	Churchill		Selwyn	17
18	Churchill		King's	18	Peterhouse		Murray Edwards	18
19	St. Catharine's		Downing II	19	Girton		Churchill	19
20	Selwyn		Fitzwilliam	20	Murray Edwards		Girton	20
21	Caius II		Caius II	21	Emmanuel II		Lady Margaret II	21
22	1st & 3rd Trinity II		Churchill	22	Lady Margaret II		Emmanuel II	22
23	Downing II		Lady Margaret II	23	Fitzwilliam		Sidney Sussex	23
24	Sidney Sussex		1st & 3rd Trinity II	24	Sidney Sussex		Robinson	24
25	Jesus II		Sidney Sussex	25	Jesus II		Fitzwilliam	25
26	Lady Margaret II		Jesus II	26	Lucy Cavendish		Homerton	26
27	Wolfson		Homerton	27	Robinson		Lucy Cavendish	27
28	Pembroke II		Pembroke II	28	Pembroke II		1st & 3rd Trinity II	28
29	Homerton		Christ's II	29	Homerton		Jesus II	29
30	Queens' II		Wolfson	30	1st & 3rd Trinity II		Christ's II	30
31	Emmanuel II		Anglia Ruskin	31	St Edmund's		Anglia Ruskin	31
32	Corpus Christi		Queens' II	32	Christ's II		Pembroke II	32
33	Christ's II		Corpus Christi	33	Anglia Ruskin		Newnham II	33
34	St Edmund's		Emmanuel II	34	Caius II		Caius II	34
35	Anglia Ruskin		Darwin	35	Newnham II		St Edmund's	35
36	Magdalene II		Peterhouse II	36	Darwin		Downing II	36
37	Darwin		Selwyn II	37	Wolfson		Clare II	37
38	Peterhouse II		St Edmund's	38	Downing II		Trinity Hall II	38
39	Churchill II		Magdalene II	39	Clare II		Darwin	39
40	Selwyn II		Clare II	40	Peterhouse II		Wolfson	40
41	1st & 3rd Trinity III		Trinity Hall II	41	Trinity Hall II		Peterhouse II	41
42	Trinity Hall II		Hughes Hall	42	Sidney Sussex II		Sidney Sussex II	42
43	Clare II		Churchill II	43	Clare Hall		Girton II	43
44	King's II		St. Catharine's II	44	Girton II		Murray Edwards II	44
45	Jesus III		1st & 3rd Trinity III	45	Lucy Cavendish II		Lucy Cavendish II	45
46	Hughes Hall		Girton II	46	Murray Edwards II		Clare Hall	46
47	Robinson II		King's II	47	1st & 3rd Trinity III		St. Catharine's II	47
48	St. Catharine's II		Lady Margaret III	48	Lady Margaret III		Anglia Ruskin II	48
49	Caius III		Jesus III	49	Anglia Ruskin II		Christ's III	49
50	Girton II		Caius III	50	Christ's III		1st & 3rd Trinity III	50
51	Lady Margaret III		Robinson II	51	St. Catharine's II		Lady Margaret III	51
52	Addenbrooke's		Clare Hall	52	Emmanuel III		Emmanuel III	52
53	Clare Hall		Queens' III	53				
54	Fitzwilliam II		Addenbrooke's	54				
55	Queens' III		Wolfson II	55				
56	Wolfson II		Fitzwilliam II	56				
57	Emmanuel III		Pembroke III	57				
58	Pembroke III		Christ's III	58				
59	Sidney Sussex II		Emmanuel III	59				
60	Christ's III		Downing III	60				
61	Homerton II		Sidney Sussex II	61				
62	Queens' IV		Homerton II	62				
63	Downing III		Hughes Hall II	63				
64	Hughes Hall II		Anglia Ruskin II	64				
65	Anglia Ruskin II		Queens' IV	65				
66	Corpus Christi II		Lady Margaret IV	66				
67	Lady Margaret IV		Girton III	67				
68	Girton III		Corpus Christi II	68				
69	Selwyn III		Selwyn IV	69				

== The Getting-on Race ==
The Getting-on Race allows a number of crews which did not already have a place from last year's races to compete for the right to race this year.

The 2012 Lent Bumps Getting-on Race took place on 24 February 2012.

=== Competing crews ===
==== Men ====
27 men's crews raced for 14 available spaces at the bottom of the 4th division. The following were successful and rowed in the bumps.

- Wolfson II
- Emmanuel III
- Pembroke III
- Sidney Sussex II
- Christ's III
- Homerton II
- Queens' IV
- Downing III
- Hughes Hall II
- Anglia Ruskin II
- Corpus Christi II
- Lady Margaret IV
- Girton III
- Selwyn II

The following were unsuccessful.

- 1st & 3rd Trinity IV
- Robinson III
- Christ's IV
- Downing IV
- Clare III
- Queens' V
- Anglia Ruskin III
- 1st & 3rd Trinity V
- Darwin II
- Lady Margaret V
- Clare Hall II
- Sidney Sussex III
- Churchill III

==== Women ====
27 women's crews raced for 15 available spaces at the bottom of the 3rd division. The following were successful and rowed in the bumps.

- Newnham II
- Downing II
- Clare II
- Peterhouse II
- Trinity Hall II
- Sidney Sussex II
- Girton II
- Hughes Hall II
- Murray Edwards II
- 1st & 3rd Trinity III
- Lady Margaret III
- Anglia Ruskin II
- Christ's III
- St. Catharine's II
- Emmanuel III

The following were unsuccessful.

- Selwyn II
- Robinson II
- Queens' II
- Clare III
- King's II
- Selwyn III
- III
- Queens' III
- St. Catharine's III
- Pembroke III
- Anglia Ruskin III

The following did not race

- Fitzwilliam II
