= May Bumps 2013 =

Rowing races at Cambridge University

The May Bumps 2013 were a set of rowing races at Cambridge University from Wednesday 12 June 2013 to Saturday 15 June 2013. The event was run as a bumps race and was the 122nd set of races in the series of May Bumps which have been held annually in mid-June in this form since 1887.

== Head of the River crews ==
Caius suffered a rudder failure and were bumped by Downing on day 3, but bumped back on day 4 to retain the headship they won in 2011.

Clare women bumped up every day (bumping Pembroke, Newnham, Jesus then Downing) to win their first headship since 1980.

== Highest 2nd VIIIs ==
Caius II finished up 3 places as the highest placed men's second VIII, bumping 1st & 3rd Trinity II, Downing II and Lady Margaret II on the way.

Pembroke II finished as the highest placed women's second VIII, finishing the week where they started as 5th overall in the W2 division. Pembroke were bumped by Fitzwilliam on day 1 and bumped Sidney Sussex on day 4.

== Links to races in other years ==
Preceding year	Current year	Following year
May Bumps 2012	May Bumps 2013	May Bumps 2014
Lent Bumps 2012	Lent Bumps 2013	Lent Bumps 2014

== Bumps Charts ==
Below are the bumps charts all 6 men's and all 4 women's divisions, with the men's event on the left and women's event on the right. The bumps chart represents the progress of every crew over all four days of the racing. To follow the progress of any particular crew, simply find the crew's name on the left side of the chart and follow the line to the end-of-the-week finishing position on the right of the chart.

Note that this chart may not be displayed correctly if you are using a large font size on your browser. A simple way to check is to see that the first horizontal bold line, marking the boundary between divisions, lies between positions 17 and 18. The combined Hughes Hall/Lucy Cavendish women's crews are listed as Lucy Cavendish only.

Pos	Crew	Men's Bumps Chart	Crew	Pos	Crew	Women's Bumps Chart	Crew
1	Caius		Caius	1	Downing		Clare
2	Downing		Downing	2	Jesus		Downing
3	Jesus		Lady Margaret	3	Newnham		Jesus
4	Lady Margaret		Jesus	4	Pembroke		Emmanuel
5	1st & 3rd Trinity		St. Catharine's	5	Clare		Caius
6	St. Catharine's		1st & 3rd Trinity	6	Emmanuel		Newnham
7	Pembroke		Pembroke	7	Christ's		1st & 3rd Trinity
8	Queens'		Queens'	8	Caius		Pembroke
9	Clare		Clare	9	1st & 3rd Trinity		Christ's
10	Fitzwilliam		King's	10	Queens'		Lady Margaret
11	Christ's		Christ's	11	Trinity Hall		Queens'
12	Emmanuel		Emmanuel	12	Lady Margaret		St. Catharine's
13	King's		Fitzwilliam	13	Girton		Peterhouse
14	Magdalene		Girton	14	St. Catharine's		Trinity Hall
15	Girton		Peterhouse	15	Selwyn		Girton
16	Trinity Hall		Homerton	16	Magdalene		Churchill
17	Homerton		Churchill	17	Peterhouse		Selwyn
18	Churchill		Magdalene	18	King's		King's
19	Robinson		Selwyn	19	Churchill		Magdalene
20	Peterhouse		Trinity Hall	20	Murray Edwards		Murray Edwards
21	Downing II		Robinson	21	Sidney Sussex		Fitzwilliam
22	Selwyn		Caius II	22	Pembroke II		Pembroke II
23	1st & 3rd Trinity II		Lady Margaret II	23	Fitzwilliam		Sidney Sussex
24	Lady Margaret II		St Edmund's	24	Robinson		Darwin
25	Caius II		Downing II	25	Emmanuel II		Jesus II
26	St Edmund's		Christ's II	26	Homerton		Emmanuel II
27	Jesus II		1st & 3rd Trinity II	27	Darwin		Newnham II
28	Sidney Sussex		Queens' II	28	Jesus II		Robinson
29	Pembroke II		Jesus II	29	Lady Margaret II		Clare II
30	Christ's II		Sidney Sussex	30	Newnham II		Homerton
31	Wolfson		Hughes Hall	31	Downing II		Lady Margaret II
32	Queens' II		Pembroke II	32	Clare II		Downing II
33	Corpus Christi		Darwin	33	Caius II		Wolfson
34	Clare II		Wolfson	34	Lucy Cavendish		Christ's II
35	Hughes Hall		Corpus Christi	35	Wolfson		Caius II
36	Darwin		St. Catharine's II	36	Christ's II		Queens' II
37	1st & 3rd Trinity III		Clare II	37	Trinity Hall II		Lucy Cavendish
38	Selwyn II		Emmanuel II	38	Queens' II		Magdalene II
39	Emmanuel II		Selwyn II	39	Corpus Christi		Corpus Christi
40	St. Catharine's II		Peterhouse II	40	Pembroke III		St. Catharine's II
41	Peterhouse II		1st & 3rd Trinity III	41	Selwyn II		Trinity Hall II
42	Lady Margaret III		Girton II	42	St. Catharine's II		Girton II
43	Robinson II		Trinity Hall II	43	Girton II		Murray Edwards II
44	Girton II		Lady Margaret III	44	1st & 3rd Trinity II		Selwyn II
45	Trinity Hall II		Queens' III	45	Magdalene II		Emmanuel III
46	Magdalene II		Emmanuel III	46	Murray Edwards II		Pembroke III
47	Fitzwilliam II		Robinson II	47	Newnham III		Newnham III
48	Queens' III		Churchill II	48	Emmanuel III		1st & 3rd Trinity II
49	Emmanuel III		Magdalene II	49	Clare Hall		Fitzwilliam II
50	King's II		Clare III	50	Sidney Sussex II		Clare Hall
51	Churchill II		Fitzwilliam II	51	Homerton II		Jesus III
52	Caius III		Clare Hall	52	Fitzwilliam II		Sidney Sussex II
53	Downing III		King's II	53	St Edmund's		King's II
54	Clare III		Caius III	54	Peterhouse II		Homerton II
55	Clare Hall		Jesus III	55	Jesus III		Peterhouse II
56	Wolfson II		Downing III	56	King's II		St Edmund's
57	Darwin II		St. Catharine's III	57	Lucy Cavendish II		Murray Edwards III
58	Selwyn III		Darwin II	58	Queens' III		Clare III
59	Jesus III		Selwyn III	59	Murray Edwards III		Queens' III
60	St. Catharine's III		Wolfson II	60	Selwyn III		Emmanuel IV
61	Christ's III		Corpus Christi II	61	Clare III		Lucy Cavendish II
62	Trinity Hall III		Homerton II	62	Robinson II		King's III
63	1st & 3rd Trinity IV		Christ's III	63	Clare IV		Selwyn III
64	Corpus Christi II		St Edmund's II	64	King's III		Queens' IV
65	Homerton II		Trinity Hall III	65	Emmanuel IV		Churchill II
66	St Edmund's II		Hughes Hall II	66	Jesus IV		Robinson II
67	Christ's IV		1st & 3rd Trinity IV	67	Queens' IV		Clare IV
68	Jesus IV		Christ's IV	68	Emmanuel V		Emmanuel V
69	Hughes Hall II		Jesus IV	69	Churchill II		Jesus IV
70	Magdalene III		Queens' IV	70	Girton III		Murray Edwards IV
71	Lady Margaret IV		Magdalene III	70	Murray Edwards IV		Fitzwilliam III
72	Sidney Sussex II		Sidney Sussex II	72	Fitzwilliam III		Girton III
73	King's III		Lady Margaret IV				
74	Queens' IV		Caius IV				
75	Hughes Hall III		Girton III				
76	Magdalene IV		Magdalene IV				
77	Caius IV		King's III				
78	Jesus V		Fitzwilliam III				
79	Clare IV		Jesus V				
80	Fitzwilliam III		Clare V				
81	Queens' V		Darwin III				
82	Emmanuel IV		Emmanuel IV				
83	Corpus Christi III		Corpus Christi III				
84	Homerton III		Queens' V				
85	Selwyn IV		Clare IV				
86	Darwin III		Selwyn IV				
87	Downing IV		Emmanuel V				
88	Girton IV		Homerton III				
89	Clare V		Downing IV				
90	Emmanuel V		Girton IV				
91	Corpus Christi IV		Churchill III				
92	Clare VI		Clare VI				
93	St. Catharine's IV		Hughes Hall III				
94	Hughes Hall III		Corpus Christi IV				
95	Churchill III		St. Catharine's IV				
