= Lent Bumps 2011 =

Rowing regatta

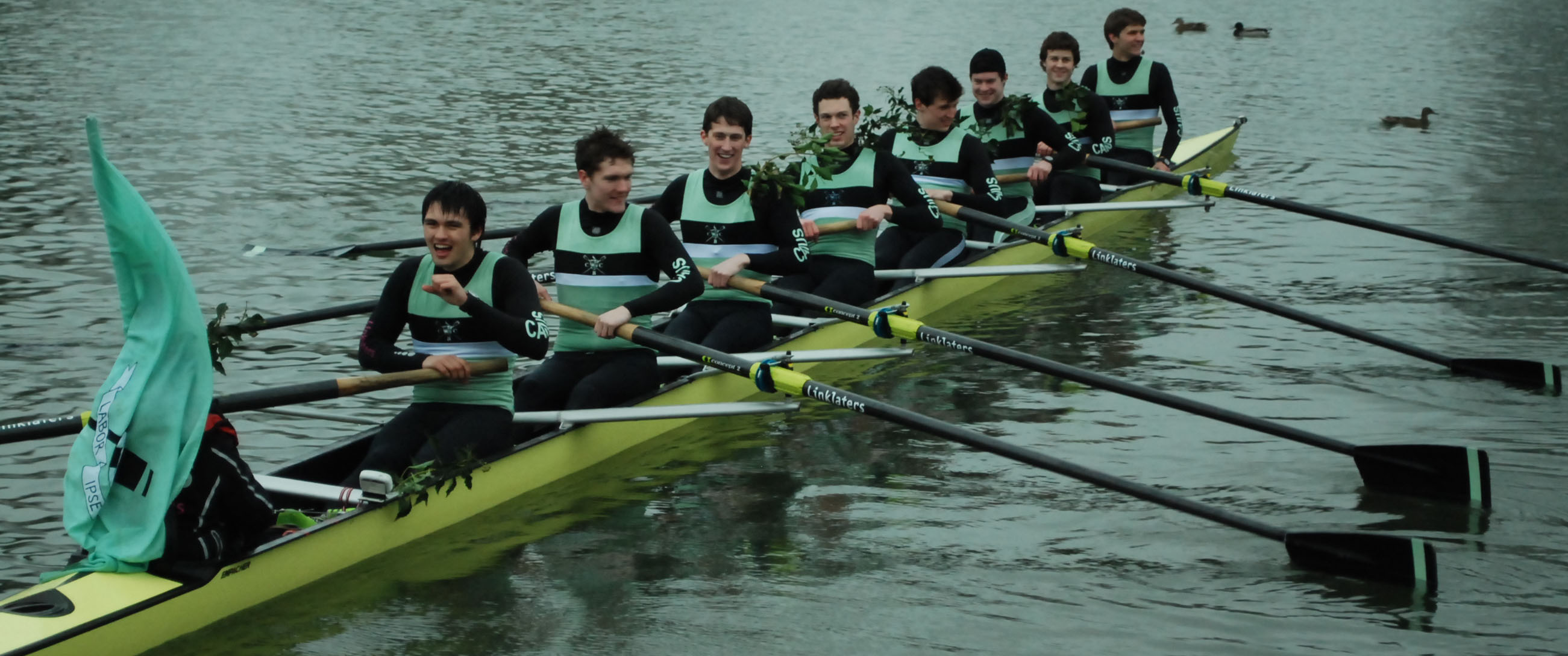
Caius M1

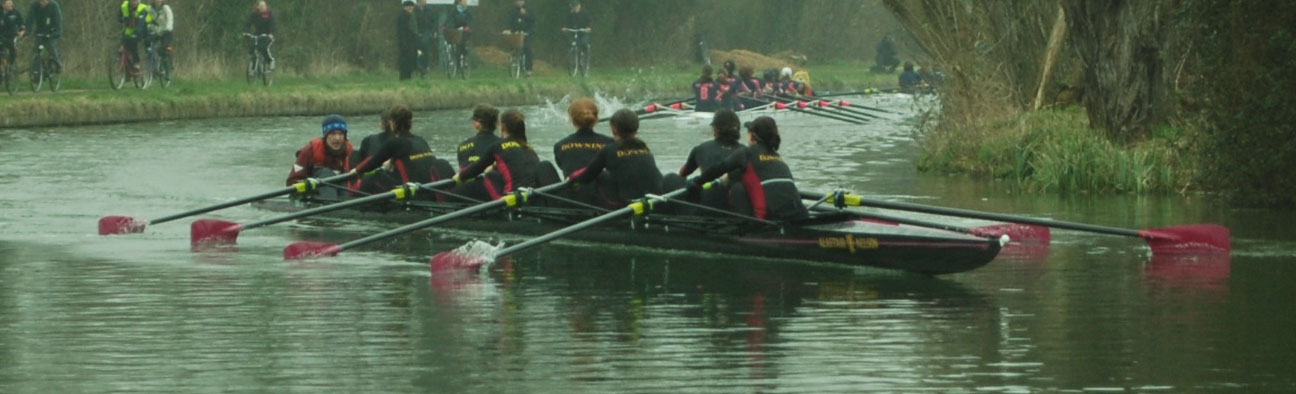
Downing W1

The Lent Bumps 2011 was a series of rowing races being held at Cambridge University from Tuesday 1 March 2011 until Saturday 5 March 2011. The event was run as a bumps race and is the 124th set of races in the series of Lent Bumps which have been held annually in late-February or early March in this form since 1887. See Lent Bumps for the format of the races. In 2011, 121 crews took part (69 men's crews and 52 women's crews), with nearly 1100 participants in total.

== Head of the River crews ==
Caius men bumped up every day, moving from 5th to 1st, to retake the headship lost to 1st & 3rd Trinity at Lent Bumps 2007.

Downing women bumped 1st & 3rd Trinity on the first day gaining the headship they last held during Lent Bumps 2005.

== Highest 2nd VIIIs ==
Caius II finished as the highest placed men's second VIII, moving up 3 places overall and bumping 1st & 3rd Trinity II on the last day.

Emmanuel II finished as the highest placed women's second VIII despite remaining 21st in the starting order overall; bumping Lady Margaret II on Day 2 before being bumped by Murray Edwards in their last race.

== Links to races in other years ==
Preceding year	Current year	Following year
Lent Bumps 2010	Lent Bumps 2011	Lent Bumps 2012
May Bumps 2010	May Bumps 2011	May Bumps 2012

== Bumps Charts ==
Below are the bumps charts all 4 men's and all 3 women's divisions, with the men's event on the left and women's event on the right. The bumps chart represents the progress of every crew over all four days of the racing. To follow the progress of any particular crew, simply find the crew's name on the left side of the chart and follow the line to the end-of-the-week finishing position on the right of the chart. The combined Hughes Hall/Lucy Cavendish women's crews are listed as Lucy Cavendish only.

Note that this chart may not be displayed correctly if you are using a large font size on your browser. A simple way to check is to see that the first horizontal bold line, marking the boundary between divisions, lies between positions 17 and 18.

Pos	Crew	Men's Bumps Chart	Crew	Pos	Crew	Women's Bumps Chart	Crew	Pos
1	1st & 3rd Trinity		Caius	1	1st & 3rd Trinity		Downing	1
2	Downing		Downing	2	Downing		Pembroke	2
3	Lady Margaret		1st & 3rd Trinity	3	Christ's		Emmanuel	3
4	Pembroke		Lady Margaret	4	Emmanuel		1st & 3rd Trinity	4
5	Caius		Queens'	5	Pembroke		Queens'	5
6	Jesus		Pembroke	6	Jesus		Christ's	6
7	Queens'		Trinity Hall	7	Caius		Jesus	7
8	Clare		Jesus	8	Clare		Trinity Hall	8
9	Trinity Hall		Peterhouse	9	Queens'		Clare	9
10	King's		Clare	10	St. Catharine's		Caius	10
11	Emmanuel		Magdalene	11	Trinity Hall		Newnham	11
12	Peterhouse		Emmanuel	12	Lady Margaret		Lady Margaret	12
13	Magdalene		Girton	13	Newnham		Magdalene	13
14	Girton		King's	14	King's		St. Catharine's	14
15	Fitzwilliam		Christ's	15	Churchill		Selwyn	15
16	Robinson		Fitzwilliam	16	Magdalene		King's	16
17	Churchill		Robinson	17	Peterhouse		Churchill	17
18	Selwyn		Churchill	18	Selwyn		Peterhouse	18
19	Christ's		St. Catharine's	19	Girton		Girton	19
20	St. Catharine's		Selwyn	20	Lady Margaret II		Murray Edwards	20
21	1st & 3rd Trinity II		Caius II	21	Emmanuel II		Emmanuel II	21
22	Sidney Sussex		1st & 3rd Trinity II	22	Sidney Sussex		Lady Margaret II	22
23	Lady Margaret II		Downing II	23	Jesus II		Fitzwilliam	23
24	Caius II		Sidney Sussex	24	Murray Edwards		Sidney Sussex	24
25	Downing II		Jesus II	25	Fitzwilliam		Jesus II	25
26	Jesus II		Lady Margaret II	26	Robinson		Corpus Christi	26
27	Wolfson		Wolfson	27	Homerton		Lucy Cavendish	27
28	Corpus Christi		Pembroke II	28	Corpus Christi		Robinson	28
29	Homerton		Homerton	29	Pembroke II		Pembroke II	29
30	Queens' II		Queens' II	30	Anglia Ruskin		Homerton	30
31	Pembroke II		Emmanuel II	31	Lucy Cavendish		1st & 3rd Trinity II	31
32	Christ's II		Corpus Christi	32	1st & 3rd Trinity II		St Edmund's	32
33	Darwin		Christ's II	33	Caius II		Christ's II	33
34	Emmanuel II		St Edmund's	34	Addenbrooke's		Anglia Ruskin	34
35	St Edmund's		Anglia Ruskin	35	Clare II		Caius II	35
36	Anglia Ruskin		Magdalene II	36	St Edmund's		Newnham II	36
37	1st & 3rd Trinity III		Darwin	37	Darwin		Addenbrooke's	37
38	Selwyn II		Peterhouse II	38	Queens' II		Darwin	38
39	Robinson II		Churchill II	39	Wolfson		Wolfson	39
40	Churchill II		Selwyn II	40	Christ's II		Downing II	40
41	Magdalene II		1st & 3rd Trinity III	41	Newnham II		Clare II	41
42	Peterhouse II		Trinity Hall II	42	Sidney Sussex II		Selwyn II	42
43	Jesus III		Clare II	43	Downing II		Peterhouse II	43
44	Clare II		King's II	44	Selwyn II		Queens' II	44
45	Lady Margaret III		Jesus III	45	Clare Hall		Trinity Hall II	45
46	Fitzwilliam II		Hughes Hall	46	Newnham III		Sidney Sussex III	46
47	Trinity Hall II		Robinson II	47	Peterhouse II		Clare Hall	47
48	King's II		St. Catharine's II	48	Trinity Hall II		Newnham III	48
49	Girton II		Caius III	49	Murray Edwards II		Girton II	49
50	St. Catharine's II		Girton II	50	Lucy Cavendish II		Fitzwilliam II	50
51	Addenbrooke's		Lady Margaret III	51	Girton II		Lucy Cavendish II	51
52	Caius III		Addenbrooke's	52	Fitzwilliam II		Murray Edwards II	52
53	1st & 3rd Trinity IV		Clare Hall	53				
54	Hughes Hall		Fitzwilliam II	54				
55	Wolfson II		Queens' III	55				
56	Sidney Sussex II		Wolfson II	56				
57	Queens' III		1st & 3rd Trinity IV	57				
58	Emmanuel III		Emmanuel III	58				
59	Clare Hall		Pembroke III	59				
60	Christ's III		Sidney Sussex II	60				
61	Homerton II		Christ's III	61				
62	Downing III		Homerton II	62				
63	Pembroke III		Trinity Hall III	63				
64	Queens' IV		Queens' IV	64				
65	Jesus IV		St. Catharine's III	65				
66	Trinity Hall III		Downing III	66				
67	St. Catharine's III		Hughes Hall II	67				
68	Magdalene II		Magdalene II	68				
69	Hughes Hall II		Jesus IV	69				

== The Getting-on Race ==
The Getting-on Race allows a number of crews which did not already have a place from last year's races to compete for the right to race this year. Up to ten crews are removed from the bottom of last year's finishing order, who must then race alongside new entrants to decide which crews gain a place (with one bumps place per 3 crews competing, subject to the maximum of 10 available places).

The 2011 Lent Bumps Getting-on Race took place on 25 February 2011.

=== Competing crews ===
==== Men ====
20 men's crews raced for 7 available spaces at the bottom of the 4th division. The following were successful and rowed in the bumps.

- Trinity Hall III
- St. Catharine's III
- Queens' IV
- Pembroke III
- Magdalene III
- Jesus IV
- Hughes Hall II

The following were unsuccessful.

- Clare Hall II
- Corpus Christi II
- Churchill III
- Clare III
- Fitzwilliam II
- Girton III
- King's III
- Selwyn III
- Wolfson III
- Caius IV
- Clare IV
- Downing IV
- Jesus V

==== Women ====
20 women's crews raced for 7 available spaces at the bottom of the 3rd division. The following were successful and rowed in the bumps.

- Trinity Hall II
- Peterhouse II
- Newnham III
- Murray Edwards III
- Hughes Hall II/*Lucy Cavendish II
- Girton II
- Fitzwilliam II

The following were unsuccessful.

- Churchill II
- Corpus Christi II
- King's II
- Magdalene II
- St. Catharine's II
- Wolfson II
- Emmanuel III
- 1st & 3rd Trinity III
- Lady Margaret III
- Murray Edwards III
- Selwyn III
- Girton III
- Emmanuel IV
