= May Bumps 2011 =

Rowing races at Cambridge University

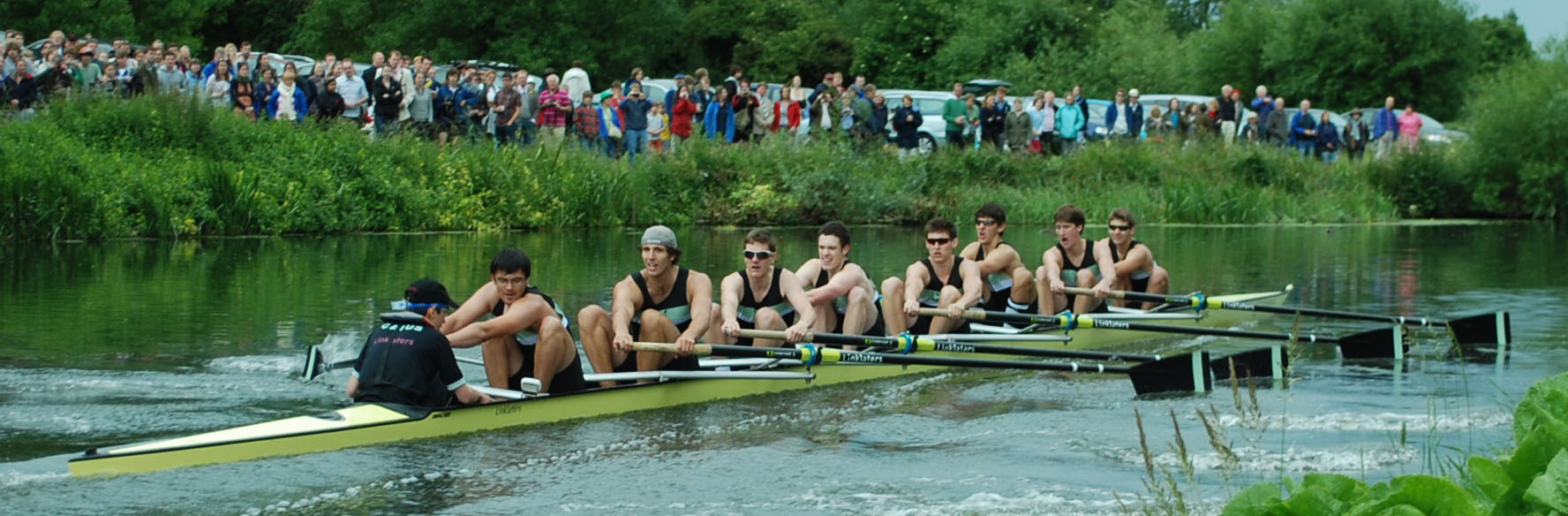
Caius M1 rowing-over at the head of men's divisions on the Saturday

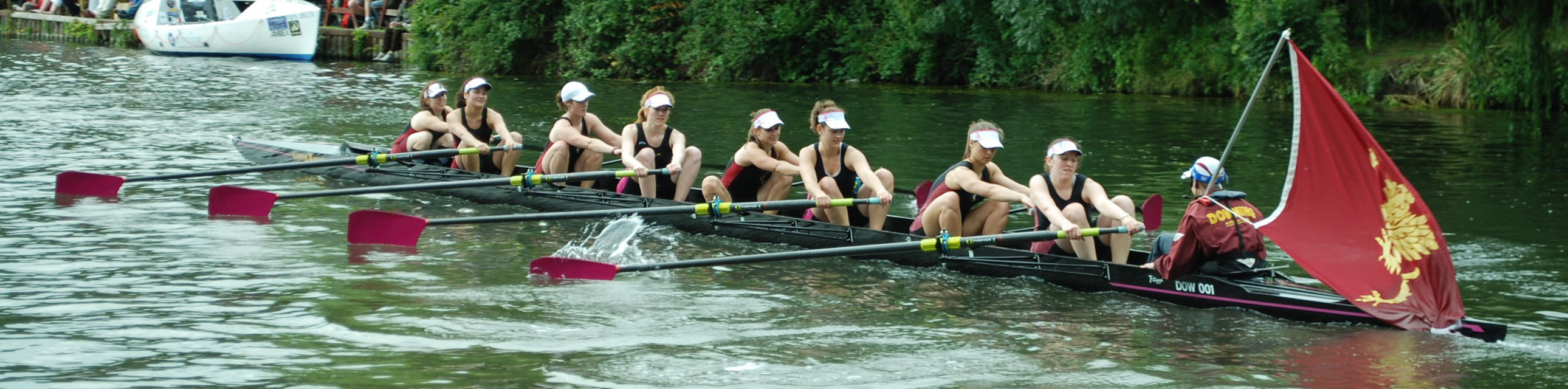
Downing W1, having rowed over as head, indulging in the traditional exhibition row with flag before M1

The May Bumps 2011 were a set of rowing races held in Cambridge, UK with crews from the boat clubs of all Cambridge University Colleges, the University Medical and Veterinary Schools and Anglia Ruskin University from Wednesday 15 June 2011 to Saturday 18 June 2011. The event was run as a bumps race and was the 120th set of races in the series of May Bumps which have been held annually in mid-June in this form since 1887. In 2011, 172 crews took part (103 men's crews and 69 women's crews), with nearly 1550 participants in total.

== Head of the River crews ==
Caius men bumped up on Wednesday and Thursday, and rowed-over twice to reclaim the headship they lost to 1st & 3rd Trinity in 2008. They hold the double Headship after becoming the head boat in Lent Bumps 2011.

Downing women bumped Pembroke on the first day and then rowed over the next three days. They also now hold a double Headship from Lent Bumps 2011.

== Highest 2nd VIIIs ==
Downing II gained the highest men's 2nd VIII from a falling 1st & 3rd Trinity II by bumping them on the final day.

Pembroke II remained the highest women's 2nd VIII despite falling to 20th due to bumps from Selwyn and Peterhouse.

== Pegasus Cup and the Biggest Risers ==
Murray Edwards won the Pegasus cup for the first time. The club's two boats both won blades despite Murray Edwards III not gaining a place throughout the Getting-On-Race (see below).

Queens' IV rose an impressive 6 places, moving into Men's division 5, by bumping into the sandwich boat position on the final day before over-bumping on Addenbrooke's.

== Links to races in other years ==
Preceding year	Current year	Following year
May Bumps 2010	May Bumps 2011	May Bumps 2012
Lent Bumps 2010	Lent Bumps 2011	Lent Bumps 2012

== Bumps Charts ==
Below are the bumps charts all 6 men's and all 4 women's divisions, with the men's event on the left and women's event on the right. The bumps chart represents the progress of every crew over all four days of the racing. To follow the progress of any particular crew, simply find the crew's name on the left side of the chart and follow the line to the end-of-the-week finishing position on the right of the chart.

Note that this chart may not be displayed correctly if you are using a large font size on your browser. A simple way to check is to see that the first horizontal bold line, marking the boundary between divisions, lies between positions 17 and 18. The combined Hughes Hall/Lucy Cavendish women's crews are listed as Lucy Cavendish only.

Pos	Crew	Men's Bumps Chart	Crew	Pos	Crew	Women's Bumps Chart	Crew	Pos
1	1st & 3rd Trinity		Caius	1	Pembroke		Downing	1
2	Pembroke		Downing	2	Downing		Pembroke	2
3	Caius		St. Catharine's	3	Christ's		Christ's	3
4	Jesus		1st & 3rd Trinity	4	Emmanuel		Newnham	4
5	Downing		Pembroke	5	Lady Margaret		Emmanuel	5
6	Lady Margaret		Jesus	6	Caius		Jesus	6
7	St. Catharine's		Lady Margaret	7	Newnham		Clare	7
8	Queens'		Queens'	8	Jesus		Lady Margaret	8
9	Fitzwilliam		Fitzwilliam	9	1st & 3rd Trinity		Queens'	9
10	Magdalene		Magdalene	10	Clare		Caius	10
11	Trinity Hall		Clare	11	Queens'		Trinity Hall	11
12	Emmanuel		Trinity Hall	12	Girton		1st & 3rd Trinity	12
13	Clare		Emmanuel	13	St. Catharine's		Magdalene	13
14	King's		Christ's	14	Trinity Hall		St. Catharine's	14
15	1st & 3rd Trinity II		Churchill	15	Magdalene		Churchill	15
16	Christ's		King's	16	Churchill		Girton	16
17	Churchill		Robinson	17	King's		Selwyn	17
18	Robinson		Downing II	18	Pembroke II		Peterhouse	18
19	Peterhouse		1st & 3rd Trinity II	19	Selwyn		King's	19
20	Selwyn		Girton	20	Jesus II		Pembroke II	20
21	Downing II		Homerton	21	Peterhouse		Sidney Sussex	21
22	Lady Margaret II		Peterhouse	22	Robinson		Emmanuel II	22
23	Girton		Lady Margaret II	23	Emmanuel II		Murray Edwards	23
24	Homerton		Selwyn	24	Anglia Ruskin		Jesus II	24
25	Caius II		Caius II	25	Sidney Sussex		Fitzwilliam	25
26	St Edmund's		Jesus II	26	Darwin		Robinson	26
27	Jesus II		St Edmund's	27	Murray Edwards		Newnham II	27
28	Anglia Ruskin		Sidney Sussex	28	Lady Margaret II		Anglia Ruskin	28
29	Darwin		Wolfson	29	Fitzwilliam		Homerton	29
30	Sidney Sussex		Pembroke II	30	Homerton		Darwin	30
31	Wolfson		Anglia Ruskin	31	Newnham II		Clare II	31
32	Christ's II		Corpus Christi	32	Clare II		Lady Margaret II	32
33	Queens' II		Darwin	33	Downing II		Lucy Cavendish	33
34	Pembroke II		Christ's II	34	Lucy Cavendish		Downing II	34
35	Emmanuel II		Queens' II	35	Corpus Christi		Trinity Hall II	35
36	Corpus Christi		Clare II	36	Magdalene II		Corpus Christi	36
37	Clare II		St. Catharine's II	37	Queens' II		Wolfson	37
38	Selwyn II		Emmanuel II	38	Caius II		Caius II	38
39	Lady Margaret II		Hughes Hall	39	Trinity Hall II		Christ's II	39
40	1st & 3rd Trinity III		Selwyn II	40	Girton II		Queens' II	40
41	St. Catharine's II		Peterhouse II	41	Wolfson		Girton II	41
42	Magdalene II		Lady Margaret III	42	Christ's II		Magdalene II	42
43	Hughes Hall		Robinson II	43	1st & 3rd Trinity II		Selwyn II	43
44	Fitzwilliam II		1st & 3rd Trinity III	44	Pembroke III		Pembroke III	44
45	Peterhouse II		Trinity Hall II	45	Emmanuel III		St. Catharine's II	45
46	Churchill II		Magdalene II	46	Selwyn II		1st & 3rd Trinity II	46
47	Robinson II		Fitzwilliam II	47	St Edmund's		Emmanuel III	47
48	Trinity Hall II		Churchill II	48	St. Catharine's II		Clare Hall	48
49	Caius III		Girton II	49	Jesus III		Newnham III	49
50	Emmanuel III		Emmanuel III	50	Clare Hall		Murray Edwards II	50
51	Girton II		King's II	51	Addenbrooke's		St Edmund's	51
52	Queens' III		Caius III	52	Newnham III		Sidney Sussex	52
53	Wolfson II		Queens' III	53	Darwin II		Jesus III	53
54	Darwin III		Pembroke III	54	Murray Edwards II		Addenbrooke's	54
55	King's II		Wolfson II	55	Sidney Sussex II		Homerton II	55
56	Jesus III		Clare Hall	56	Churchill II		Darwin II	56
57	Pembroke III		Downing III	57	1st & 3rd Trinity III		Christ's III	57
58	Selwyn III		Darwin II	58	Homerton II		1st & 3rd Trinity III	58
59	Clare Hall		Jesus III	59	Fitzwilliam II		Fitzwilliam II	59
60	Downing III		Clare III	60	Christ's III		Churchill II	60
61	1st & 3rd Trinity IV		Selwyn II	61	Queens' III		Lucy Cavendish II	61
62	St. Catharine's III		St. Catharine's III	62	King's II		Peterhouse II	62
63	Clare III		Trinity Hall III	63	Lucy Cavendish II		King's II	63
64	Corpus Christi II		St Edmund's II	64	Clare III		Selwyn III	64
65	Trinity Hall III		1st & 3rd Trinity IV	65	Peterhouse II		Queens' III	65
66	Lady Margaret IV		Jesus IV	66	Trinity Hall III		Pembroke IV	66
67	St Edmund's II		Christ's III	67	Jesus IV		Clare III	67
68	Christ's III		Corpus Christi II	68	Pembroke IV		Jesus IV	68
69	Jesus IV		Magdalene III	69	Selwyn III		Trinity Hall III	69
70	Magdalene III		Lady Margaret IV					
71	Sidney Sussex II		Homerton II					
72	Christ's IV		Christ's IV					
73	1st & 3rd Trinity V		Sidney Sussex II					
74	Churchill III		Pembroke IV					
75	Homerton II		Hughes Hall II					
76	Caius IV		1st & 3rd Trinity V					
77	Pembroke IV		Robinson III					
78	Jesus V		Churchill III					
79	Hughes Hall II		Sidney Sussex III					
80	Robinson III		Caius IV					
81	Fitzwilliam III		King's III					
82	Sidney Sussex III		Jesus V					
83	Pembroke V		Queens' IV					
84	King's III		Girton III					
85	Addenbrooke's		Fitzwilliam III					
86	Lady Margaret V		Addenbrooke's					
87	Girton III		Pembroke V					
88	Lady Margaret VI		Lady Margaret V					
89	Queens' IV		Christ's V					
90	Christ's V		Lady Margaret VI					
91	Downing IV		Magdalene IV					
92	Girton IV		King's IV					
93	Clare IV		Downing IV					
94	Emmanuel IV		Emmanuel IV					
95	Magdalene IV		Clare IV					
96	Downing V		Churchill IV					
97	King's IV		Corpus Christi III					
98	Churchill IV		Girton IV					
99	Corpus Christi III		Selwyn IV					
100	Hughes Hall III		Downing V					
101	Queens' V		Queens' V					
102	Selwyn IV		Hughes Hall III					
103	Sidney Sussex IV		Sidney Sussex IV					

== The Getting-on Race ==
The Getting-on Race (GoR) allows a number of crews which did not already have a place from last year's races to compete for the right to race this year. Up to ten crews are removed from the bottom of last year's finishing order, who must then race alongside new entrants to decide which crews gain a place (with one bumps place per 3 crews competing, subject to the maximum of 10 available places).

The 2011 May Bumps Getting-on Race took place on 10 June 2011.

=== Competing crews ===
==== Men ====
20 men's crews raced for 10 available spaces at the bottom of the 6th division. The following were successful and rowed in the bumps.

- Clare IV
- Emmanuel IV
- Magdalene IV
- Downing V
- King's IV
- Churchill IV
- Corpus Christi III
- Hughes Hall III
- Queens' V
- Selwyn IV
- Sidney Sussex IV

The following were unsuccessful.

- Sidney Sussex V
- Clare Hall II
- Clare V
- Emmanuel IV
- Wolfson III
- Clare VI
- Robinson IV

The following did not race.

- Caius V
- Jesus VI

==== Women ====
13 women's crews raced for 7 available spaces at the bottom of the 4th division. The following were successful and rowed in the bumps.

- Hughes Hall II
- Clare III
- Peterhouse II
- Trinity Hall III
- Jesus IV
- Pembroke IV
- Selwyn III

The following were unsuccessful.

- Lady Margaret III
- Downing III
- Pembroke V
- Murray Edwards III
- Girton III

The following did not race.

- Caius III
