= Clare Boat Club =

British rowing club

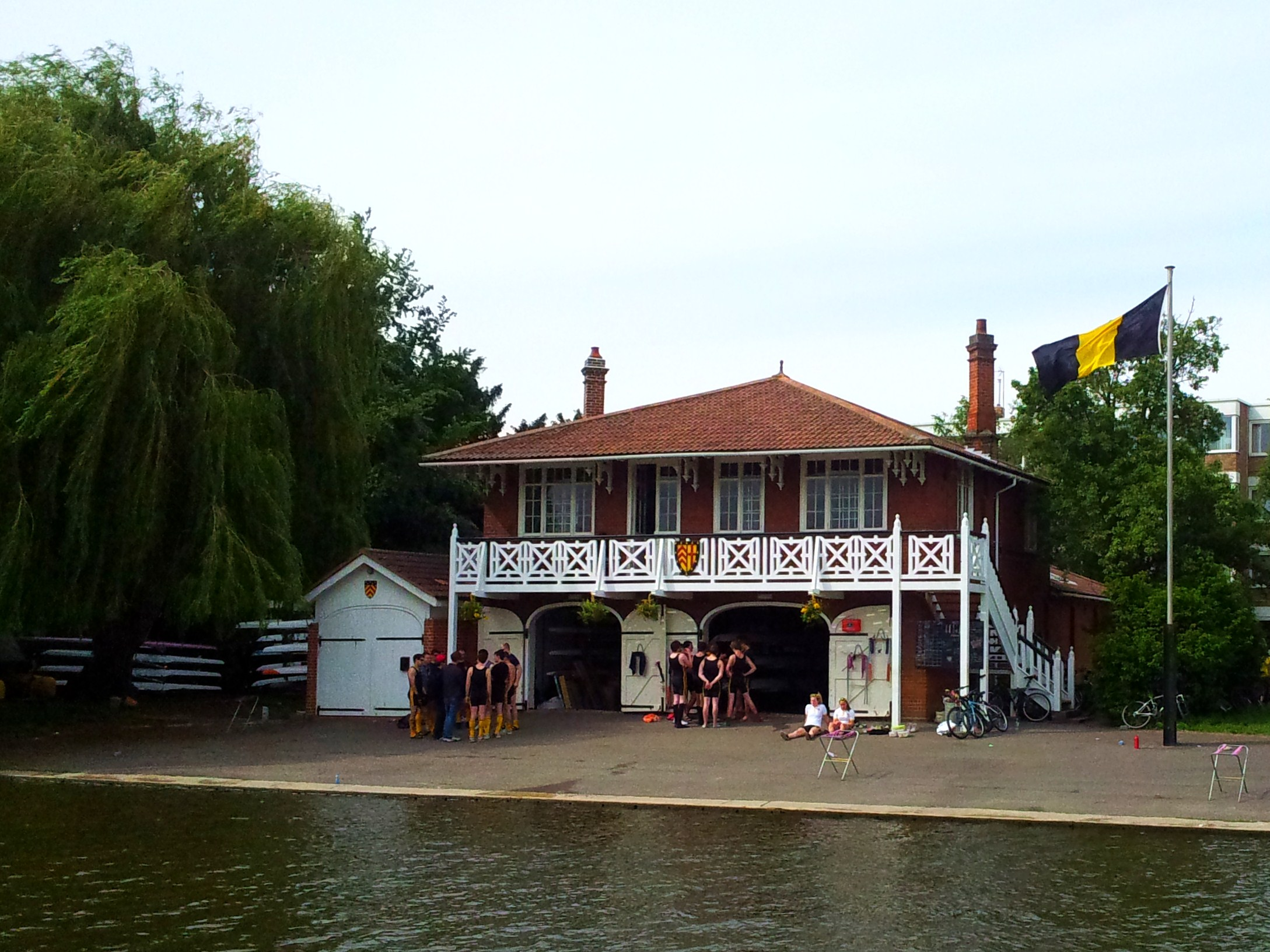

- Location: Cambridge, England
- Coordinates: 52°12′38.31″N 0°8′0.31″E
- Home water: River Cam
- Founded: 1831
- Membership: Clare College, Cambridge
- Affiliations: British Rowing CUCBC
- Website: clareboatclub.org.uk

Events
- Clare Novice Regatta

Notable members
- David Jennens, Charles Sergel, Ben Rigby

Clare Boat Club is the rowing club for members of Clare College, Cambridge, it was founded in 1831.

Like other college boat clubs at the University of Cambridge, the prime constitutional aim of Clare Boat Club is to gain and hold the Headship of the Lent Bumps and May Bumps, now held in eight-oared boats, separately for men and women. In the May Bumps, the men's 1st VIII rose to Head of the River in 1941 and held it until 1944, regaining the Headship again in 1949. The women's 1st VIII retained Headship in the first women's May Bumps in 1974 and held it three more times in 1979, 1980 and 2013 and started 1st in the first women's Lent Bumps in 1976 but did not gain the Headship.

== History ==
The men's 1st VIII entered their first May Bumps race in 1831, achieving second place in the first division by the end of 1832. They dropped steadily over the following decade, reaching an all-time low of forty-first in 1845, before the Mays boat reached fourth again in 1886, the year before the Lent races began. It was nearly 50 years before this position was reached again.

Prior to about 1930, the men's 1st VIII spent most of its time near the boundary of the 1st Division and 2nd Division of both the Lent and May Bumps charts. However, they did win Headship in the Lent Bumps competition of 1939 and remained in the top ten of Lents until the 1960s, and returned to form in the early 1970s, taking the Headship again in 1973. Since then, they have spent most of their time in the 1st Division. In the May Bumps, the 1st VIII rose to Head of the River in 1941. They held the Headship until 1944, regaining it again in 1949. Since then, the men's 1st VIII has spent most of their time in the first division, but, similar to the story of Lent Bumps, it has dropped into the 2nd Division on occasions. In 2015, the men's 1st VIII finished eighth on the river in the first Division of May Bumps, their highest position for 27 years. In 2016 the men's 1st VIII bumped up four places, winning Blades and attaining the College's highest place on the river for 46 years.

The women's 1st VIII started 1st in the first ever women's Lent Bumps in 1976, but were unable to finish with the Headship. In 2005, the women's 1st VIII came very close to taking the Headship but Downing managed to cling onto it. However, the women did manage to win their first ever Lents Headship in 2006. In the first ever women's May Bumps in 1974, Clare started and retained their position of Head of the River. The Women's 1st VIII has since held the Headship in Mays on three further occasions, initially in 1979 and 1980; Clare regained the women's Headship in 2013, with the crew gaining Blades in the process. In 2015, Clare Women's 1st VIII finished sixth on the river in the 1st Division of May Bumps. In 2016 the Women's 1st VIII bumped up two places to finish fourth, in parity with the Men's 1st VIII.

The club's head coach and boathouse manager, from 2010 to 2017, Anton Wright, appeared on Channel 4's year-long reality TV show, Eden (2016).

== Clare Novice Regatta ==
Clare Boat Club organises an annual regatta in November for novice College crews. It is run as a side-by-side regatta for eights, with a series of knockout races over a course of approximately 800m. In 2012, the novice men's 1st VIII won the Regatta and also triumphed in Queens' Ergs and Emma Sprints. This was the first time in Clare Boat Club's history that a men's VIII had won all three of these novice competitions in the same year.

== Notable alumni ==
- Sir Archibald Dennis Flower, represented Cambridge University and became Mayor of Stratford
- David Jennens, represented Cambridge University and Great Britain
- Charles Sergel, represented Cambridge University and Great Britain

== Honours ==
=== Henley Royal Regatta ===
Year	Races won
1937	Ladies' Challenge Plate
1939	Ladies' Challenge Plate
1949	Visitors' Challenge Cup

=== Boat Race representatives ===
The following rowers were part of the rowing club at the time of their participation in The Boat Race.

Men's boat race

Year	Name
1860	B. N. Cherry
1875	G. L. Davis (cox)
1876	G. L. Davis (cox)
1877	G. L. Davis (cox)
1878	G. L. Davis (cox)
1879	G. L. Davis (cox)
1886	A. D. Flower
1924	G. H. Ambler
1925	G. H. Ambler
1926	G. H. Ambler
1931	C. J. S. Sergel
1932	C. J. S. Sergel
1933	R. B. F. Wylie
1933	C. J. S. Sergel
1934	D. J. Wilson
1939	J. Turnbull
1946	T. J. Sullivan
1947	A. P. Mellows
1948	A. P. Mellows
1949	D. M. Jennens
1950	D. M. Jennens
1951	D. M. Jennens

Year	Name
1954	C. M. Davies
1954	J. N. Bruce
1956	J. A. L. Russell
1963	B. J. R. Jackson
1969	C. Robson
1970	A. C. Buckmaster
1971	G. J. Phillpotts
1974	D. J. Walker
1977	N. G. Burnet
1982	A. R. Knight
1983	A. R. Knight
1984	A. R. Knight
1999	Vian Sharif
2011	Joel Jennings
2021	Drew Taylor
2023	Jasper Parish

Women's boat race

Year	Name
2015	Claire Watkins
2022	Jasper Parish (cox)
