= Churchill College Boat Club =

Rowing club at Churchill College, Cambridge

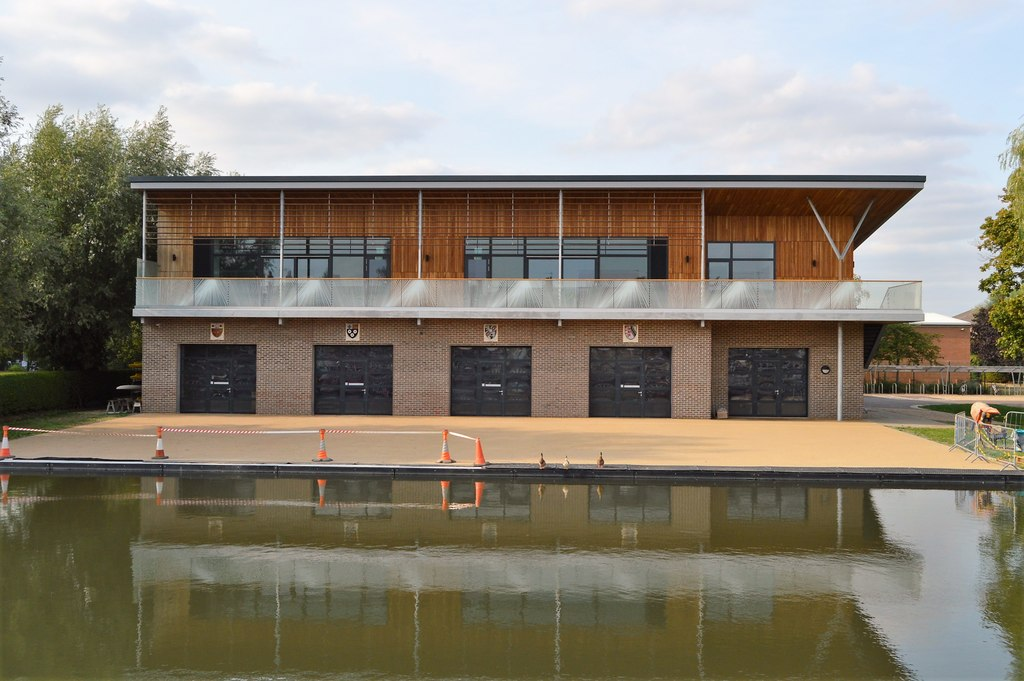

- Location: Cambridge, England
- Coordinates: 52°12′41.17″N 0°8′21.59″E
- Home water: River Cam
- Founded: 1961
- Membership: Churchill College, Cambridge
- Affiliations: British Rowing CUCBC
- Website: churchillboatclub.org.uk

Churchill College Boat Club is the rowing club for members of Churchill College, Cambridge.

The club colours are pink and brown, chosen because they were the horse-racing colours of Sir Winston Churchill. In recent years, the club has become famous for its lurid pink racing shells. The men's 1st VIII started the trend in 2002, with the women taking delivery of their own in 2006. The trend has continued to the extent that the club now has a pink double scull. The women also sport pink splash-tops and lycra in the summer months.

Churchill College shares a boat house, known as "Combined", with Selwyn, King's and The Leys School. The boat house is the furthest downstream of all the College boathouses, which is a natural advantage for early morning outings.

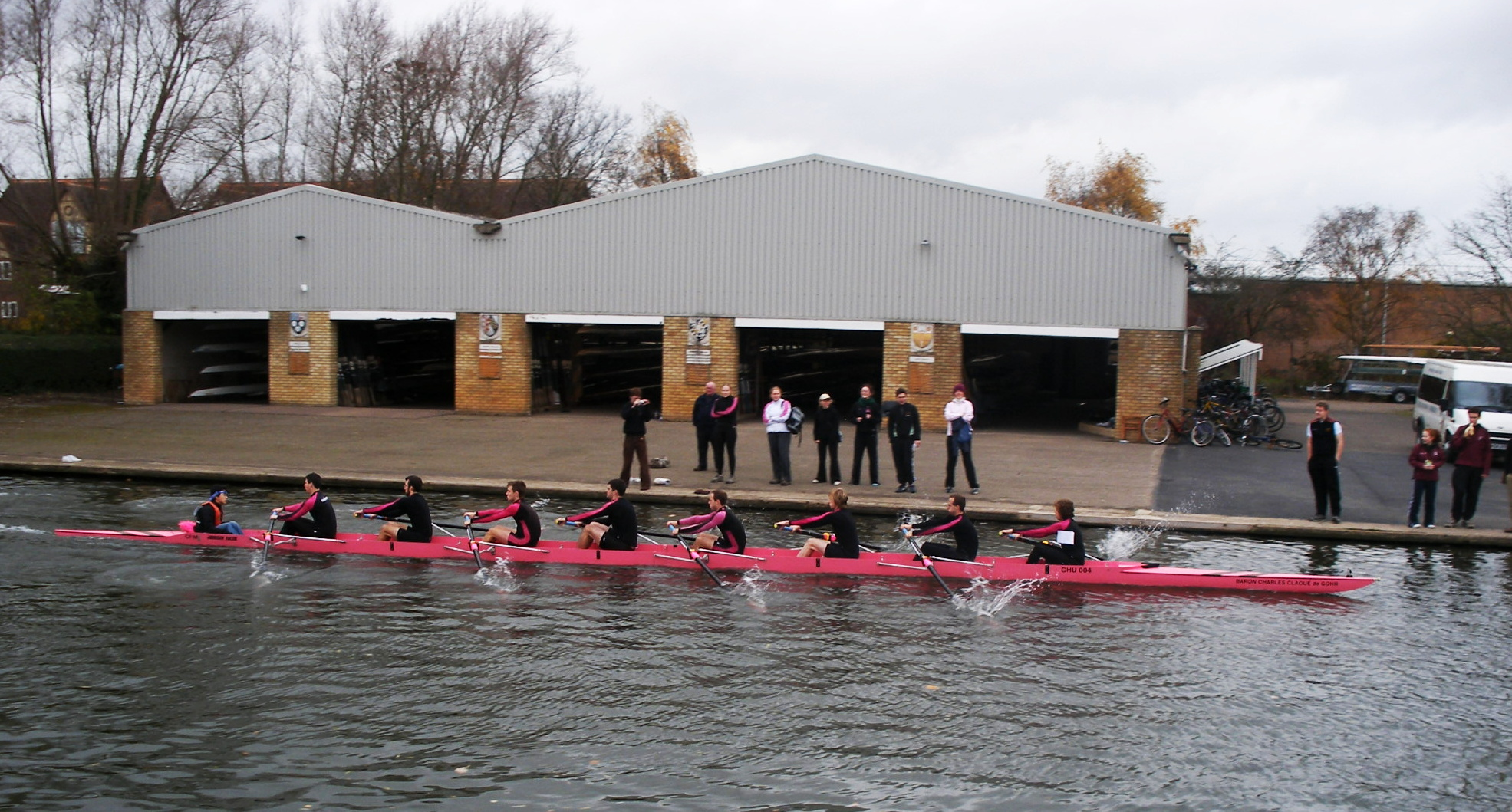
Churchill M1 passing the boathouse during the Fairbairns Cup, November 2007.

== History ==
The men's boat club was founded in 1961 after a remark was made during the Lent Bumps that a college was not really a college until it was on the River. Frank Maine and Ed Markham led the effort to get the club on the river, under guidance from Canon Noel Duckworth, the first chaplain at the college. The boat of postgraduates used the training time of 6 am – 9 am on weekday mornings as the river was deserted. This time is now common across all clubs at Cambridge. The 1st boat started the May Bumps in the seventh (bottom) division in 1961, bumping twice before being stopped by carnage on the third day, then being bumped themselves on the last. Following a successful Lent Bumps in 1962, the Churchill 1st VIII were repositioned up into the 3rd division for the May Bumps of the same year.

By the early 1970s, the men's 1st VIII had risen to the 1st division of the Lent and May Bumps, but found itself back in the 2nd division by the end of the decade. It achieved its highest ever position at 5th in Lent Bumps 1998. In May Bumps 2006, the crew rose to 6th place, an all-time high for that competition.

The women's boat club took part in the first women's bumps in 1974, racing in fours until 1989. The 1st women's VIII took the headship of the Lent Bumps in 1984. In the May Bumps, Churchill women have been Head of the River a total of 6 times (1978, 1985, 1986, 1987, 1989 and 1990), although only for the last headship were the races held in eight-oared boats. Between 1985 and 1987, Churchill finished Head of the Mays on 12 consecutive days, the longest ever continuous defence of the women's Mays Headship.

The College has been awarded both the Pegasus Cup (2013, 2015), and the Marconi Cup (2015) for the best performing college in May and Lent Bumps respectively. Both the Men's and Women's crews hold spots in the first division of these races.

== Honours ==
=== Boat Race representatives ===
The following rowers were part of the rowing club at the time of their participation in The Boat Race.

Men's boat race

Year	Name
1986	E. A. F. (Ted) Gibson

Women's boat race

Year	Name
2024	Iris Powell

=== Henley appearances ===
Churchill Women won the "College A" event at the inaugural Henley Women's Regatta in 1988, and again in 1990. Churchill Men last qualified for the Temple Challenge Cup in 1996 at Henley Royal Regatta, progressing to the second round.

== Gallery ==
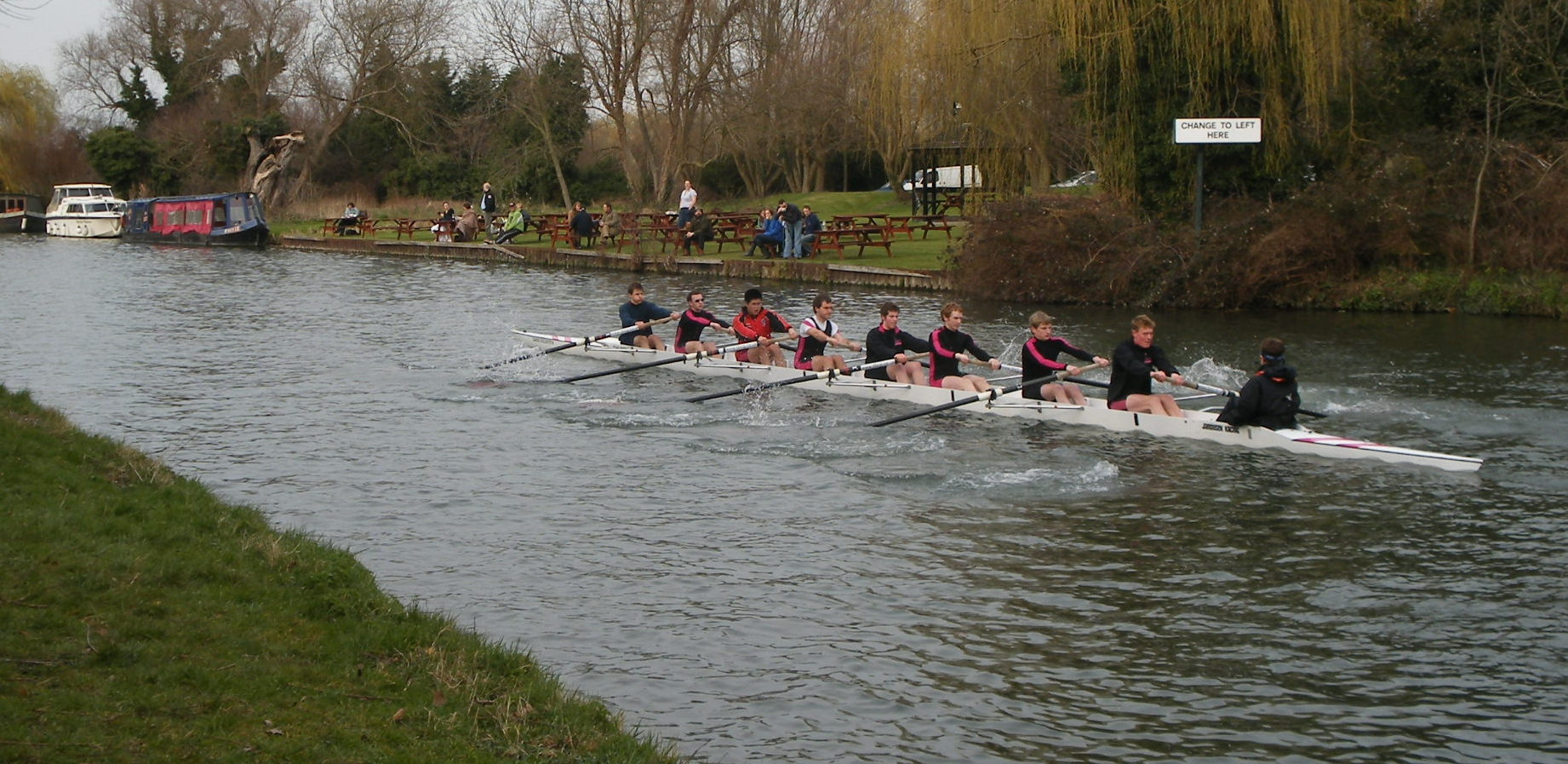
M2 practising a start before the Lent Bumps, 2008

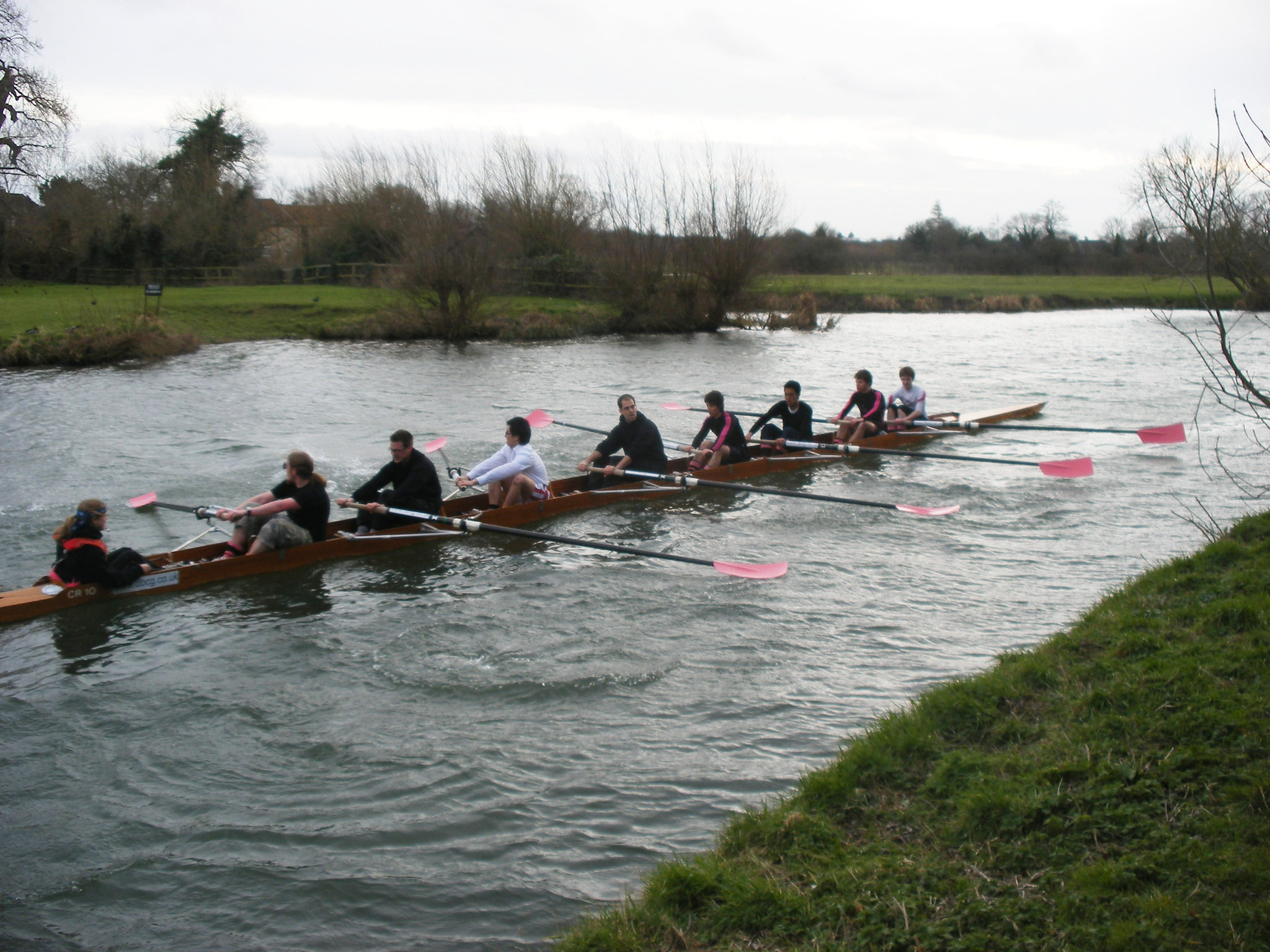
M4 in the Lent Bumps getting on race, 2008

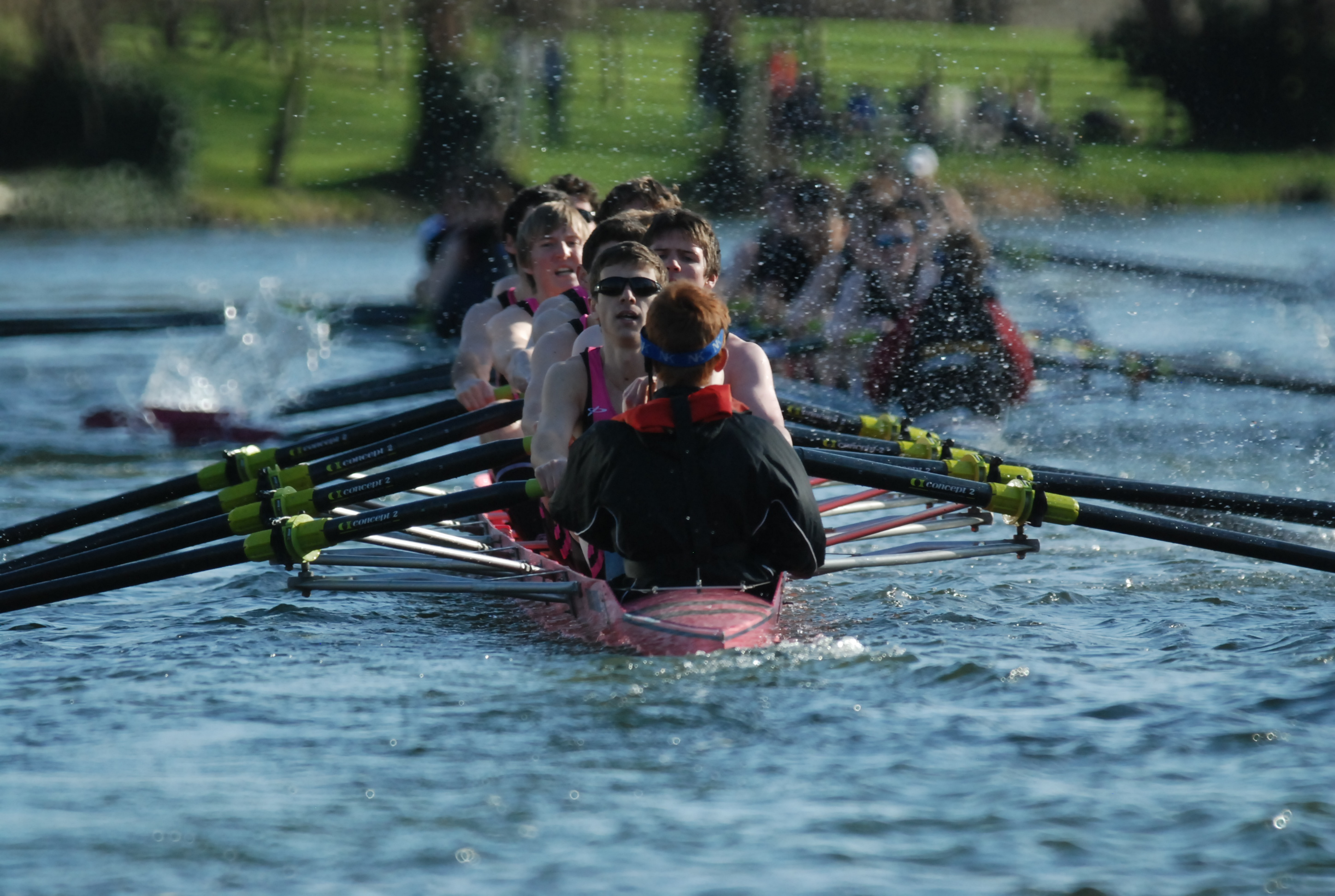
M1 chasing Fitz, Lent bumps 2012

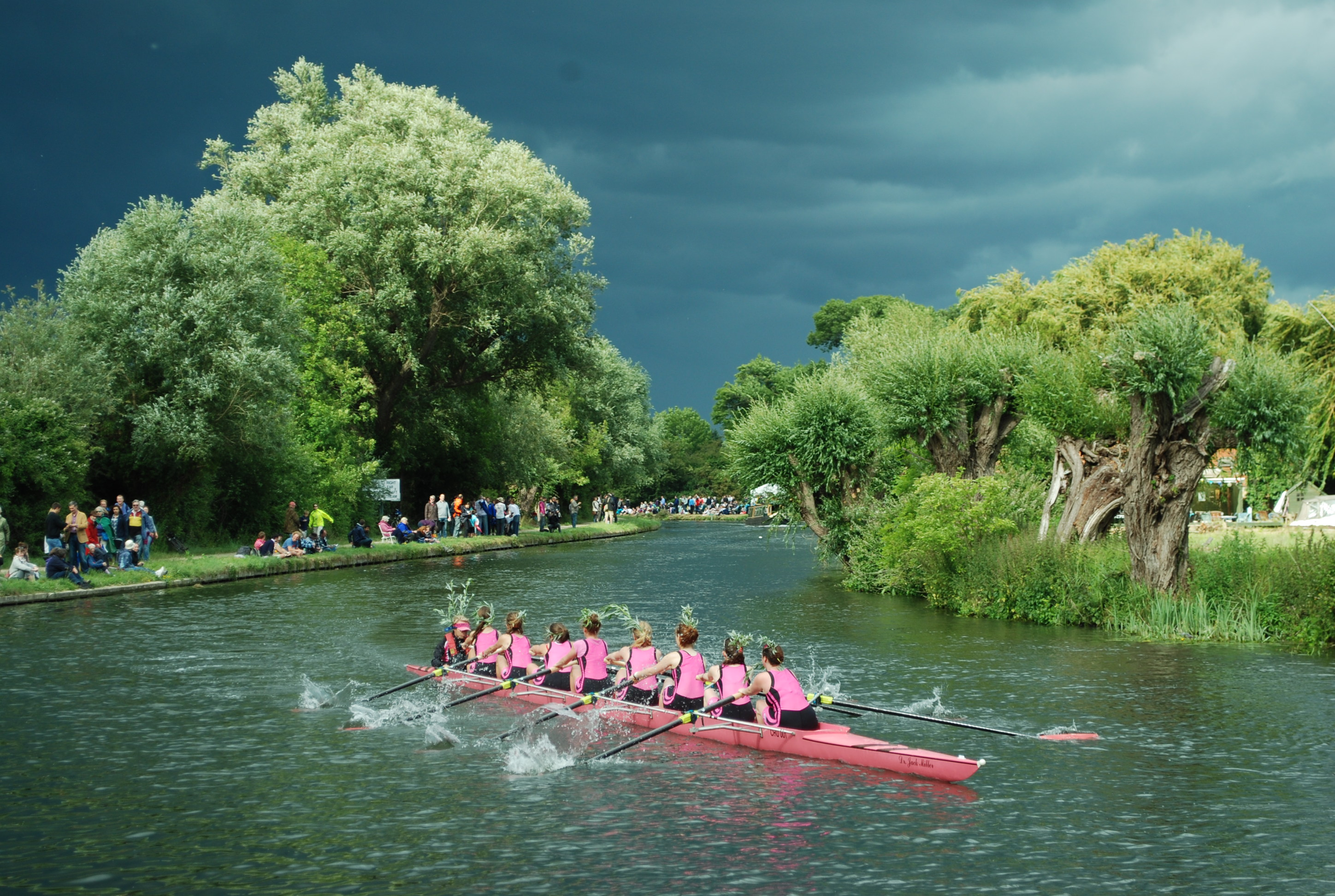
Churchill W1 with laurels, having bumped Girton in the Mays 2011
