= Hughes Hall Boat Club =

British rowing club

Hughes Hall College Boat Club
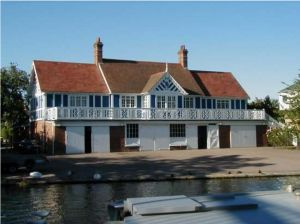

- Emmanuel College boathouse
- Location: Cambridge, England
- Coordinates: 52°12′38.6″N 0°8′4.3″E
- Home water: River Cam
- Founded: before 1992
- Membership: Hughes Hall
- Affiliations: British Rowing, CUCBC
- Website: hugheshallboatclub.co.uk

Hughes Hall Boat Club (HHBC) is the rowing club for members of Hughes Hall, Cambridge. HHBC houses its boats in the Emmanuel boathouse. HHBC has a history of consistently impressing on several fronts. It has risen rapidly through the Cambridge College rowing ranks since its inception in the 1970s to become one of the most successful clubs on the river, frequently winning the prestigious accolade of Blades in the annual Lent and May Bumps Regatta. The Men's first crew won blades in the May Bumps in 1993, 1995, 1996, 1997, 2001, 2002, 2003, 2004, 2007, 2009, 2011, 2013, 2014, 2019, and 2022.

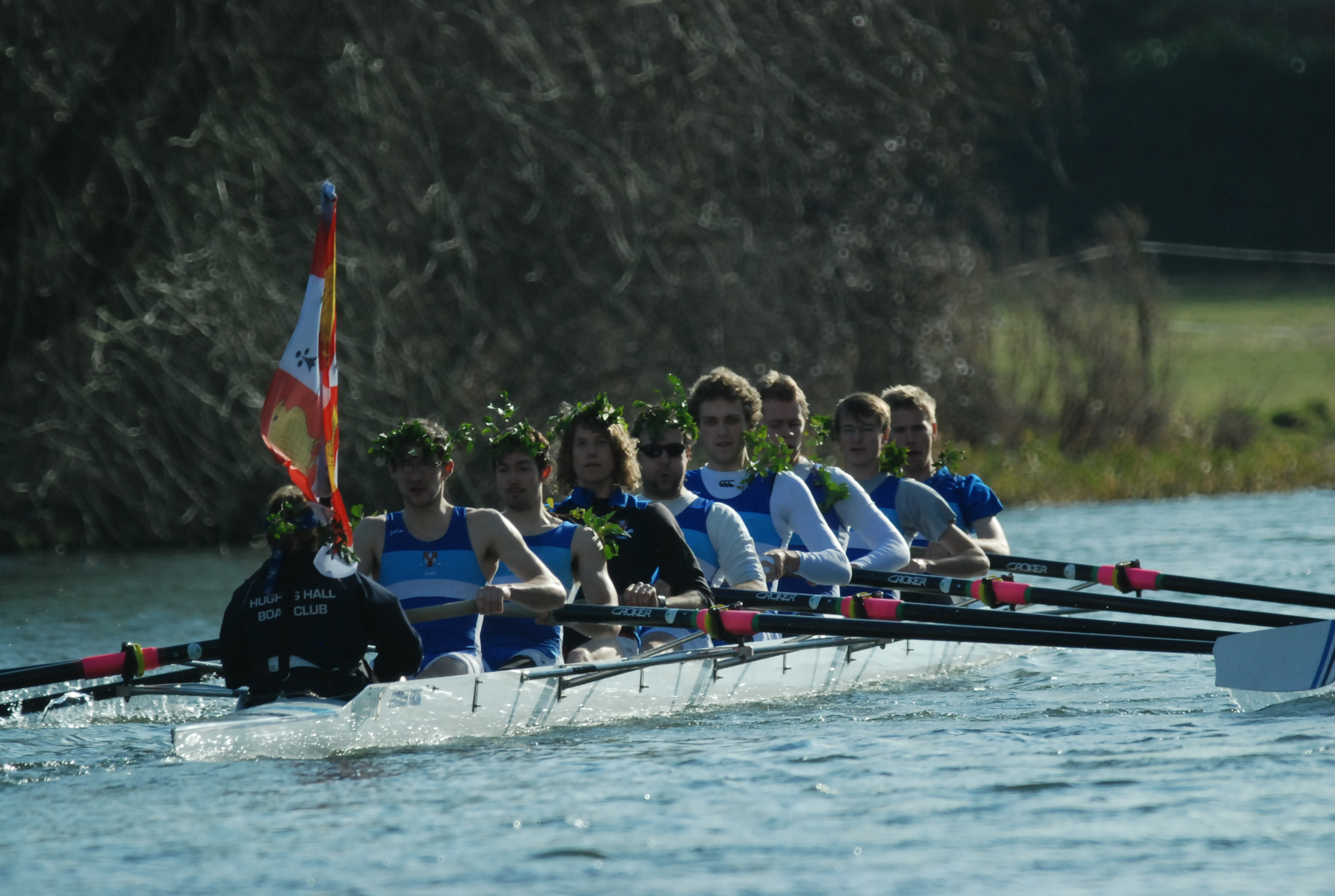
M1, blades, Lents 2012

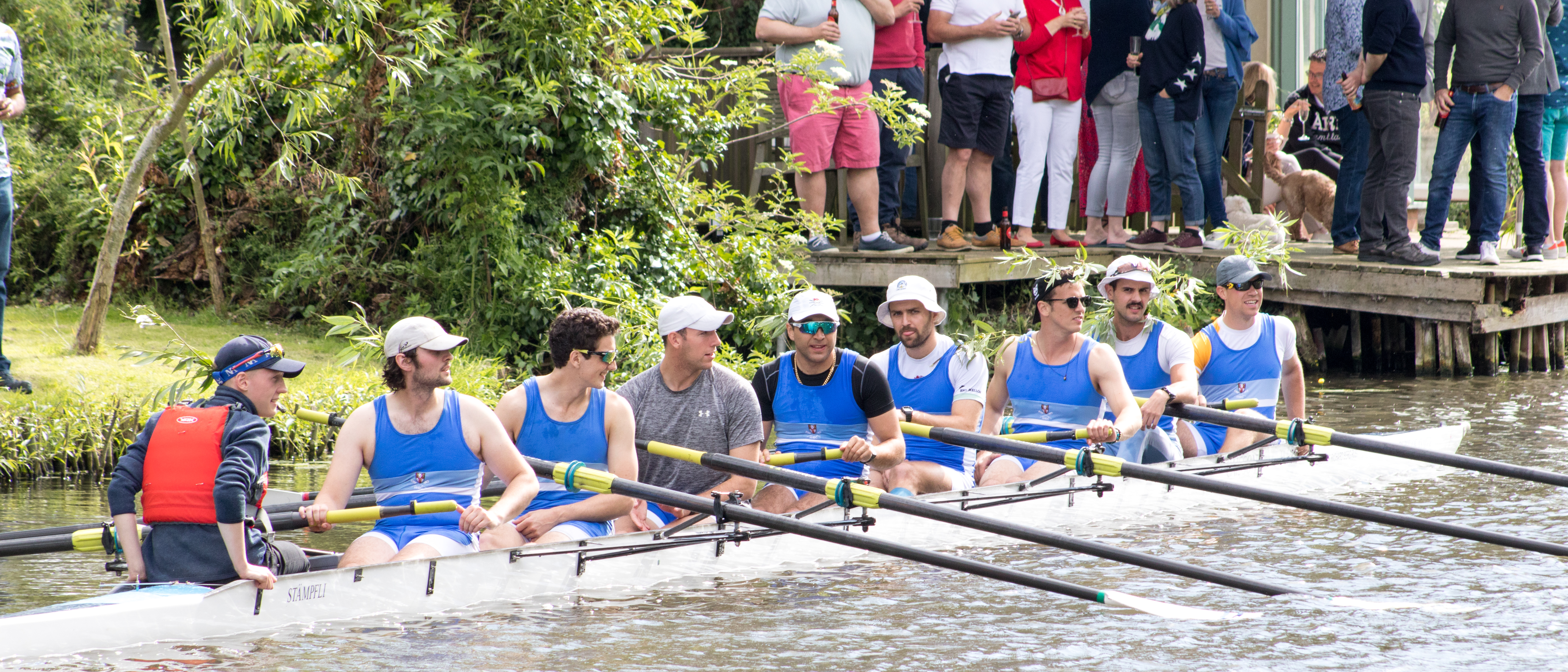
Hughes Hall M1, May Bumps 2019 having just won blades

== History ==
Hughes Hall first competed in the May Bumps in 1979 when the men started at 112th on the river and went down two places while the women started at 20th on the river and went down three places. The following year the men achieved HHBC's first ever bump on Sidney Sussex M6 but the women had to wait until 1999 to achieve their first May bump.

In 2003 there was an official merger with the boat club of Lucy Cavendish College, an all-women's college of Cambridge University. The result was a combined club formally recognised by the Cambridge University Combined Boat Clubs as the "Hughes Hall/ Lucy Cavendish Combined Boat Club". This combination was the only one of its type at Cambridge.

Since the merging of the boat club has enjoyed significant advances marked by three squads winning blades during the May Bumps 2009, including a 10 place gain by M2. It was also the first time the boat club fielded four crews into the May Bumps and winning the Pegasus Cup, awarded to the boat club that shows the largest cumulative advancement at the bumps, three times – in 2007, 2009 and 2014. They are the only club to have won the Pegasus Cup on more than one occasion.

In 2008, the women flew to Galway Ireland to race in the Tribesman Head of the River race and qualified for the Intermediate Coxed Fours in 2008 at Henley Women's Regatta.

In October 2017 it was announced that the two college clubs were to separate.

Hughes Hall admits many students on one-year degrees. As such, the boat club trains many novices each year. Top performers are often given opportunities in the first VIII. Hughes Hall is also known for producing many of those rowers who represent CUBC at The Boat Race. In 2009 half the roster of Goldie, the 2nd Varsity boat, were from Hughes. This continued in 2010, including CUBC President Deaglen McEachern who was the first representative from Hughes Hall to hold this post. In the 2019 Boat Race, Dara Alizadeh was Light Blue president in the victorious Cambridge crew which also contained fellow Hughesian Grant Bitler.

== Honours ==
=== Boat Race representatives ===
The following rowers were part of the rowing club at the time of their participation in The Boat Race.

Men's boat race

Year	Name
1995	Russell S. Slatford
2005	Bernd Heidicker
2005	Peter Rudge (cox)
2006	Peter Rudge (cox)
2008	Tom Ransley
2008	Ryan Monaghan
2009	Deaglan McEachern
2009	Tom Ransley
2010	George Nash
2010	Deaglan McEachern
2010	Fred Gill
2011	Derek Rasmussen
2011	David Nelson
2011	Liz Box (cox)
2012	Jack Lindeman
2012	David Nelson
2012	Niles Garratt
2013	Ty Otto
2013	Niles Garratt
2014	Henry Hoffstot
2015	Jasper Holst
2015	Ben Ruble
2015	Henry Hoffstot
2016	Henry Hoffstot

Year	Name
2016	Ben Ruble
2016	Lance Tredell
2017	Ben Ruble
2017	James Letten
2017	Patrick Eble
2017	Lance Tredell
2017	Henry Meek
2018	James Letten
2018	Dara Alizadeh
2018	Finn Meeks
2019	Grant Bitler
2019	Dara Alizadeh
2023	Noam Mouelle
2023	Thomas Lynch
2024	Noam Mouelle
2024	Kenneth Coplan
2024	Thomas Lynch
2025	Noam Mouelle
2026	Noam Mouelle
2026	Alexander McClean
2026	William Klipstine

Women's boat race

Year	Name
2015	Rosemary Ostfeld
2016	Rosemary Ostfeld
2025	Sophia Hahn
2025	Samantha Morton
2026	Isobel Campbell
