= Corpus Christi College Boat Club (Cambridge) =

Rowing club of Corpus Christi College, Cambridge

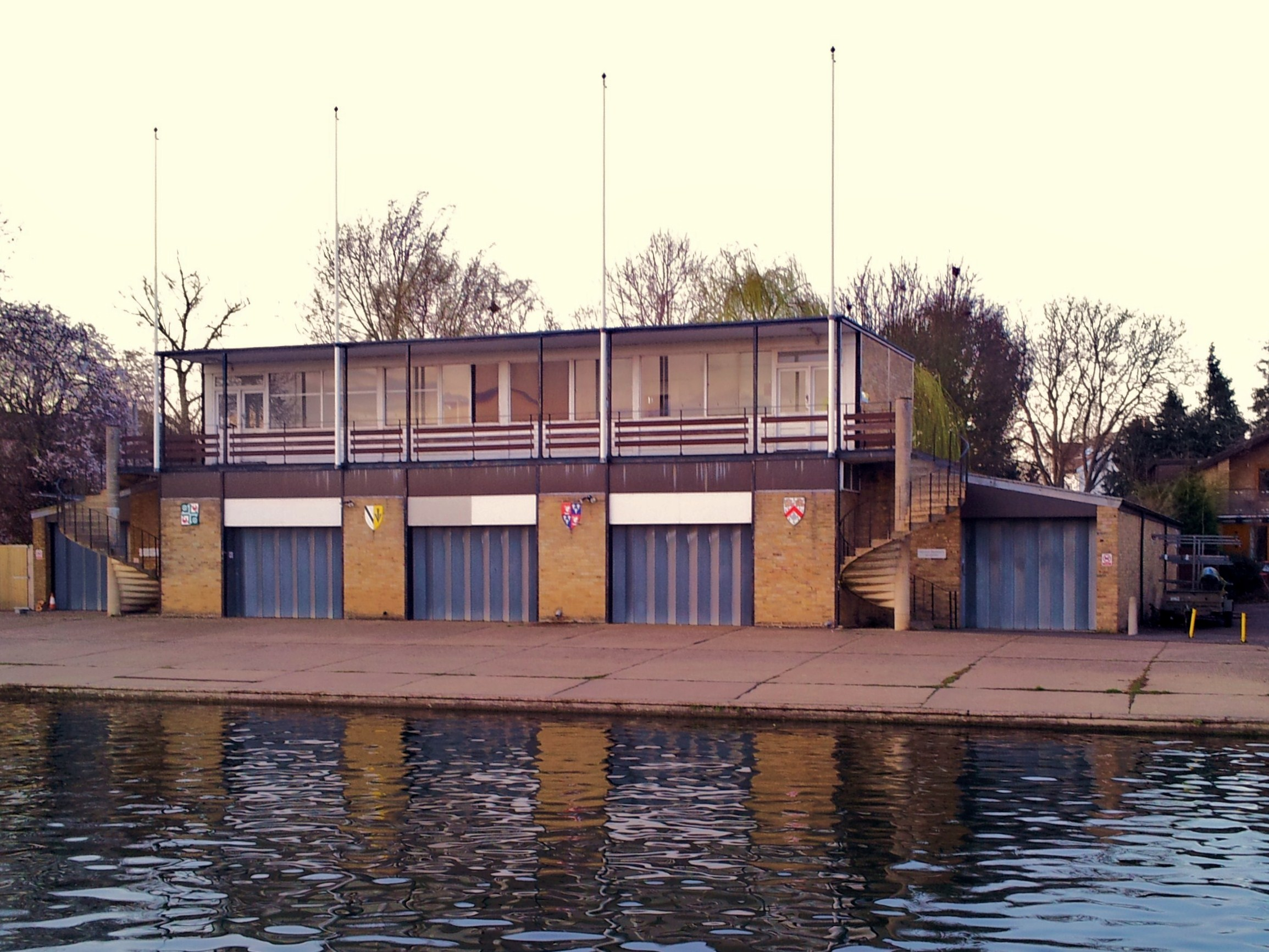

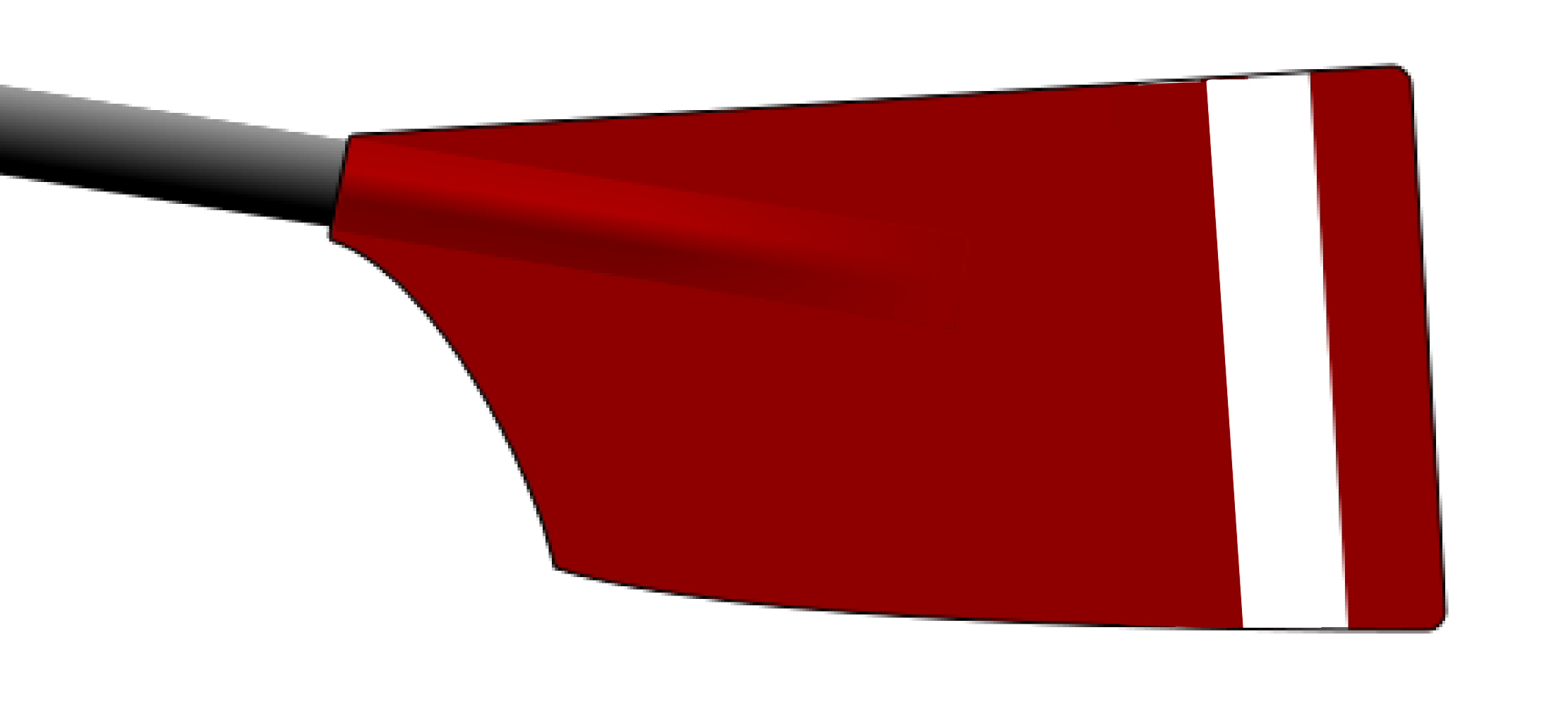
- Location: Cambridge, England
- Coordinates: 52°12′38.9″N 0°7′56.71″E
- Home water: River Cam
- Founded: 1828
- Membership: Corpus Christi College, Cambridge
- Affiliations: BR CUCBC
- Website: cccbc1828.org

Corpus Christi College Boat Club (often shortened to Corpus) is the rowing club for members of Corpus Christi College, Cambridge. Corpus blade colours are maroon with a vertical white stripe and rowers wear kit of the same colour. The boat club crest features the same mythical pelican as that of the College, often pictured in front of a pair of crossed blades. Corpus is one of the smallest colleges in the University of Cambridge, typically fielding 2-3 men's crews and 2-3 women's crews in the Lent and May Bumps races each year. It shares the Old Combined boathouse with the college boat clubs of Sidney Sussex, Girton and Wolfson colleges.

== History ==
Corpus III bumps Girton III in May Bumps 2005

Corpus Christi College Boat Club was founded in 1828. The club benefited greatly when the Lent and May Bumps became separate events in 1887. The 1st VIII started 3rd in the first Lent Bumps in 1887 and managed to take the headship that year. They did again in 1891, but fell away into the 2nd division thereafter, although rising as high as 6th in 1953. Due to how the May Bumps start order was derived in 1887, Corpus started relatively low down and has since spent most of its time in or around the 2nd division. To date, 1887 and 1891 are the only headships Corpus has achieved. A women's crew first appeared in 1984 and has spent most of their early years in the 2nd division of both the Lents and Mays, briefly making the 1st division in the 1987 Lents.

In the bumps, the small size of Corpus has meant that a periodic shortage of well-trained crews has meant Corpus is prone to yo-yo. This has meant Corpus has traditionally found it difficult to get a sufficient run of good crews to get into the 1st Division. The men were last in the Mays 1st Division in 1994, however a run of bad form in the late 1990s and 2000s saw them slip down to the top of the 3rd Division by 2009. After a few years around the bottom of the 2nd Division, they have been progressing upwards since 2014, and in 2017 finished 9th in the 2nd Division. In the Lent Bumps the men have been around the middle to bottom of the 2nd Division since the early 1990s, although like in the Mays, have been moving upward in recent years. They finished the 2018 Lent Bumps 5th in the 2nd Division. The women have fluctuated between the middle of the 2nd Division and the 3rd Division in recent years in the May Bumps. In 2016 they achieved a club record of +6, finishing 12th in the 2nd Division. In Lent Bumps 2020, they finished 11th in the 2nd Division and won blades. In 2016 Corpus won the Pegasus Cup for the most successful college boat club in the May races.

== Honours ==
=== Henley Royal Regatta ===
Year	Races won
1952	Wyfold Challenge Cup

=== Boat Race representatives ===
The following rowers were part of the rowing club at the time of their participation in The Boat Race.

Year	Name
1836	Augustus Ker Bozzi Granville
1839	A. Paris
1854	H. Blake
1860	J. S. Blake
1861	J. S. Blake
1862	E. Sanderson
1862	F. H. Archer (cox)
1863	F. H. Archer (cox)
1864	E. V. Pigott
1864	F. H. Archer (cox)
1865	E. V. Pigott
1865	F. H. Archer (cox)
1884	G. H. Eyre

Year	Name
1890	E. T. Fison
1891	E. T. Fison
1892	E. T. Fison
1893	E. H. M. Waller
1913	W. M. Askwith
1938	A. M. Turner
1939	A. M. Turner
1953	P. D. Hall
1958	R. B. Ritchie
1982	N. J. Bliss
1990	Adam J. Wright
1991	Adam J. Wright
