= Sidney Sussex Boat Club =

British rowing club

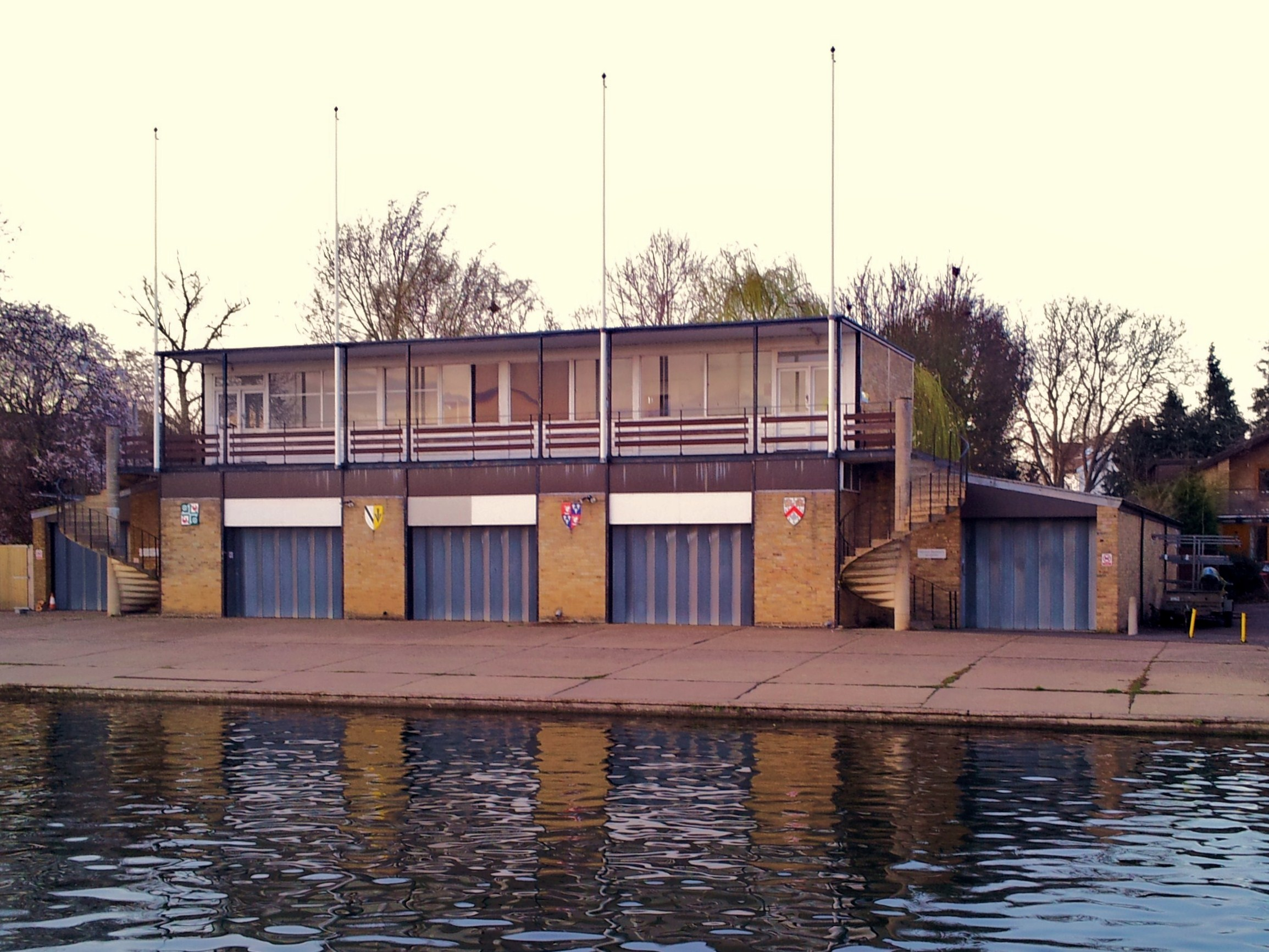

- Location: Cambridge, England
- Coordinates: 52°12′39″N 00°07′57″E
- Home water: River Cam
- Founded: 1837
- Membership: Sidney Sussex College, Cambridge
- Affiliations: CUCBC, British Rowing
- Website: ssbc.org.uk

Sidney Sussex Boat Club (often referred to as just Sidney or SSBC) is the rowing club for members of Sidney Sussex College, Cambridge, in England.

== History ==
Founded in 1837, the men's side of the club has spent most of its time in the 2nd division of the Lent Bumps and May Bumps, with brief times spent in the 1st and 3rd divisions. The men's side of the club generally crews two boats in the Lent Bumps and three boats in the May Bumps. Being a small college, the club has never had the consistency to rise to take a headship of either event, and has been as high as 6th in the Lent Bumps in 1913, and 11th in the May Bumps in 1923.

A women's crew was first formed in 1978 and has spent most of its time hovering between 1st and 2nd divisions in both the Lent and May Bumps. Sidney's 1st Women's VIII re-entered division 1 of the Lent Bumps in 2022 for the first time since 2004, and re-entered division 1 of the May Bumps in 2024 for the first time since 1998. The women's side of the club generally crews one or two boats in the Lent Bumps and two boats in the May Bumps.

In Lent Bumps 2020, Sidney Sussex were the winners of the Marconi Cup, which is awarded to the highest performing of boat club overall. The Women's second boat were winners of blades, bumping a total of five times.

In its recent history, the men's 1st VIII has fallen, and now resides in the lower half of the 2nd division in the Lent bumps, and the top of the 3rd division in Mays. The last major successes enjoyed by a Sidney men's crew in the May bumps were in the 2002, 2014, and 2017 May Bumps. In 2002 the 3rd Men's VIII, racing in the fifth division, won blades by bumping up every day. The crew became well known on the river during the four days of competition due to their decision to race whilst wearing large, curly mullet wigs (and were known within the Boat Club as 'The Mullets').

In 2008, Sidney’s 2nd Women’s VIII won blades in both sets of Bumps races and received the “Fastest Women’s 2nd VIII” award at the Fairbairn Cup. In 2009, the boat club also recorded a successful season, particularly among the women’s crews. The Women’s 1st VIII won blades in the Lent Bumps, while in the May Bumps five of the seven Sidney crews rose in the rankings, and no crew finished lower than its starting position. The Sidney 3rd Women’s VIII—achieving three bumps, an over-bump (from sandwich boat position on the same day as a bump), and a double over-bump—rose eleven places, overtaking the Sidney 2nd Women’s VIII, which rose three places.

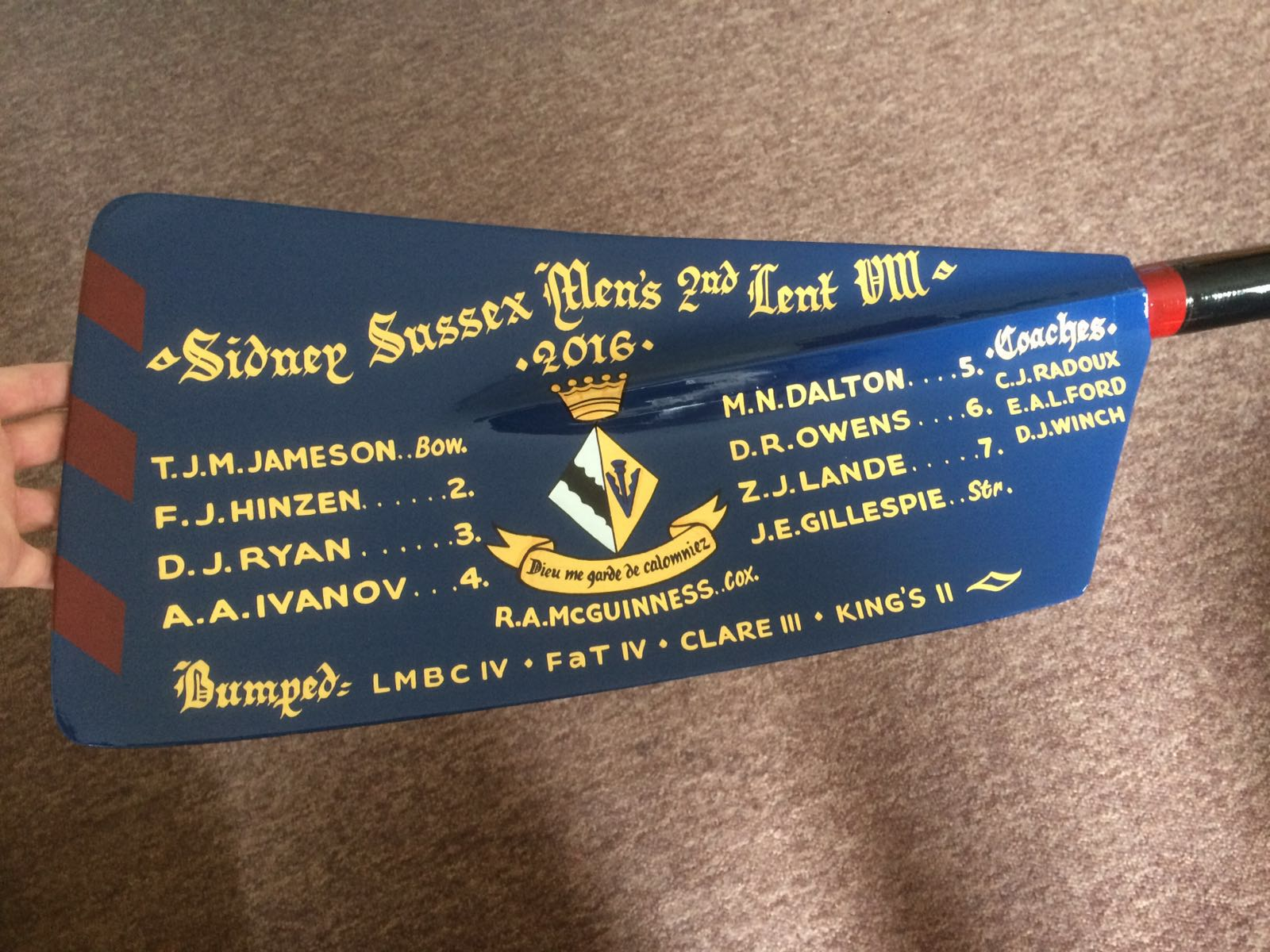
Oar won by SSBC M2 in 2016 Lent Bumps

In the May Bumps, Sidney saw success most recently in 2014 and 2017. In 2014, the 2nd men's VIII, racing in the fifth division – starting in third place on day one – won blades despite rowing over on the first day. This was done by bumping up on the second day, then on the third day rising four positions, bumping up into first place in the fifth division, then rowing again as the sandwich boat in the fourth division, where they overbumped Trinity First and Third IV. On the fourth day, Sidney bumped up again, securing their blades.

In 2017, the 1st Men's VIII, racing in the second division – having only just returned from the third division a year earlier – won their oars by bumping up each day. Sidney caught Pembroke II on day one, Clare II on day two, Darwin on day three, and First and Third Trinity II on the final day. By winning their blades for the first time in many years, Sidney Sussex not only surpassed crews which had become longstanding rivals (Clare II in particular), but also rose above a fellow first boat for the first time in many years. Whereas previously only the Clare Hall and the Anglia Ruskin University first boats lay below them, Darwin now joined their ranks.

In Lent Bumps, the 1st Men's VIII most recently won blades in 2010, while the 2nd Men's VIII won blades in 2016 and 2025.

== Lord Protector Boat Club ==
The Lord Protector Boat Club (LPBC) is the Alumni section of SSBC, named for Sidney alumnus Oliver Cromwell. Members of Sidney Sussex, once they have left Cambridge, become members of LPBC. The event most regularly entered by LPBC is the Fairbairn cup, held by Jesus College Boat Club annually in December.

== Boathouse ==
Sidney boats from the Old Combined boathouse on the Cam, shared with Girton, Wolfson, and Corpus Christi colleges. This boathouse, with changing facilities, was built in 1958 to a design by David Roberts and extended in the 1980s. It was listed as Grade II in 1997.

== Honours ==
=== Boat Race representatives ===
The following rowers were part of the rowing club at the time of their participation in The Boat Race.

Men's boat race

Year	Name
1852	E. Hawley
1852	W. S. Longmore
1870	E. L. Phelps
1871	E. L. Phelps
1913	H. Roper
1914	P. C. Livingstone
1933	R. N. Wheeler (cox)
1976	J. P. Manser (cox)

Year	Name
1977	A. R. Waterer
1977	J. P. Manser (cox)
1988	J. C. T. Pepperell
1989	Nick Justicz
1991	Maximillian C. J. Justicz
1992	Maximillian C. J. Justicz
1997	Alan Watson

Women's boat race

Year	Name
2023	James Trotman (cox)
