= King's College Boat Club =

British rowing club

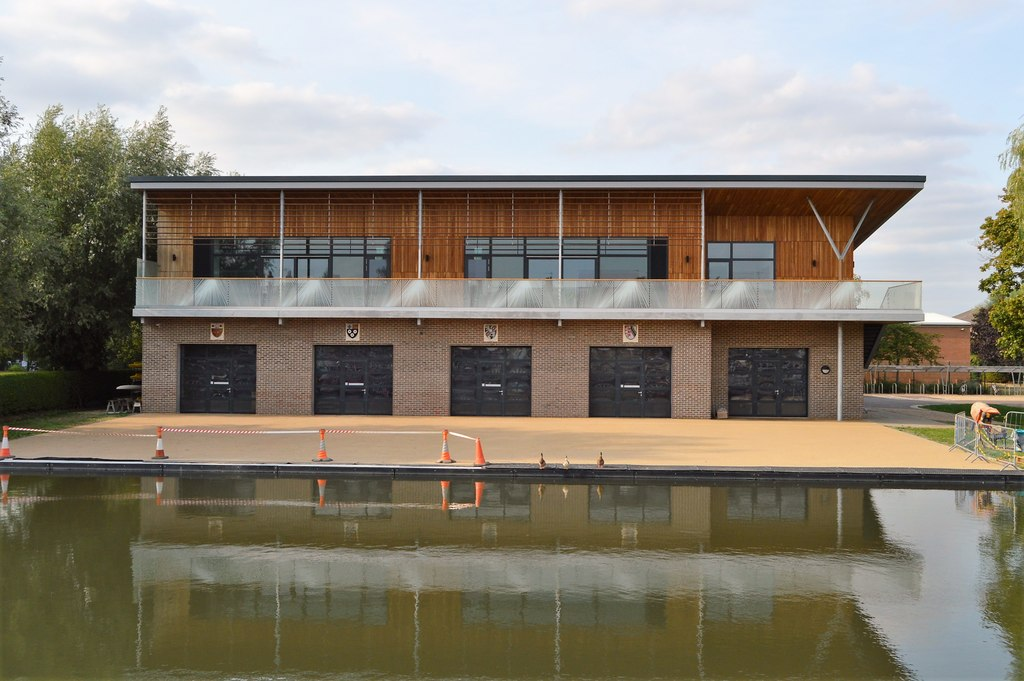

- Location: Cambridge, England
- Coordinates: 52°12′41.17″N 0°8′21.59″E
- Home water: River Cam
- Founded: 1838
- Key people: Tom Makins (Men's Captain); Clementine Semler-West (Women's Captain)
- Affiliations: British Rowing CUCBC
- Website: kingsboatclub.com

King's College Boat Club is the rowing club for members of King's College, Cambridge. The first record of King's rowing is in 1838. The club has provided multiple rowers for The Boat Race, the first in 1867 and in 1973, women rowed at King's for the first time.

== History ==
By 1840 King’s had reached 7th position in the Lent Bumps, just before losing places and being taken off in 1842. They made a brief return in the ‘Sloggers’ races (qualifying bumps races) in 1845-46 before disappearing. In 1853, they returned, quickly became head of the ‘Sloggers’ and rose 6 places in 6 days in the First Division. When CUBC creates two smaller divisions in 1854, King’s climbed back into the first division for the second successive year. However, they were taken off in 1855, possibly due to new CUBC rules regarding the eligibility of certain rowers.

In 1867, F.E. Cunningham became the first Blue from King's, whilst the uniform was agreed in 1868 including a white coat bounded by King’s colours, caps for the Lents and straw hats in the Mays. In 1875, King’s produced a second boat for the first time, but they failed to get on. The King's 1st men's VIII have spent most of their history in the second division of the Lent and May Bumps. In 1897, King's reached 4th in the Lent Bumps, but subsided back into the 2nd division just four years later. A few brief periods in the first division have followed, but in the mid-1980s, the 1st VIII found themselves in the 3rd division for the first time ever. In 2005, King's managed to reach the first division for the first time since 1976. This position was consolidated in 2006 and 2007 with a further three bumps in both years, and another two in 2008, finishing 9th. The following year saw a drop of three places, two of which were recovered in 2010, but two successive years of spoons saw King's fall back to the second division. 2013 saw the previous year's result reversed with blades being awarded ensuring that the stay in the 2nd division only lasted one day.

In the May Bumps, performance has largely been similar to that of the Lent Bumps. From 1912 until 1930, King's was in the first division, reaching 5th in 1923. In 1982, King's dropped into the 3rd division and since 1989 had a continuous existence in the second division. Recent movement has reflected that of the Lents, rising from 15th in the second division on the first day of 2003 to the first division by close of racing in 2009. 2010 saw another three bumps, with King's finishing 14th in the first division. This position couldn't be maintained in 2011, which saw an incredibly strong year for college rowing, but 3 bumps in 2012 and a further 3 in 2013 saw King's reach 10th, the highest position held by a King's crew since the 1950s. This is a record that has since been broken again: in the 2020 Lent Bumps, M1 climbed 3 places to ninth on the river.

In 1973, women row at King's for the first time, forming a women's boat club under the name Queen Margaret of Anjou Boat Club (QMABC). Queen Margaret of Anjou was the Queen Consort to King Henry VI, who founded King's College. Sally Millership coxes the Men’s 2nd VIII, having been prevented from coxing M1 as the Amateur Rowing Association (ARA) decide mixed crews are not allowed (the M1 wanted to row in ARA events). The following year she becomes the first female member of a King’s M1 boat. The 1st women's VIII rowed in the Lent Bumps from the first ever women's race in 1976 and May Bumps from the 2nd ever women's race in 1975. In the Lent Bumps, the women started in 2nd position in 1976, but did not race in 1979. In the 1980 race, they were put on at the bottom of the 1st division and fell into the 2nd, where they have remained since. In the May Bumps, the 1st women's IV started in 7th and rose as high as 3rd in 1977 but had fallen into the 2nd division by 1986. When the bumps were reorganised in 1990, the QMABC 1st women's VIII started and maintained a position in the 2nd division.

In the 1996 bumps races, King's women's crews inherited the positions that QMABC crews held in 1995. The King's women's 1st VIII held a position in the 2nd division in both the Lent and May Bumps until the May Bumps 2005, where they managed to break into the 1st division for the first time since the May Bumps were rowed in eight-oared boats.

2012/13 saw arguably one of the strongest years in the history of the club for the 1st men, despite no University rowers at the club. Michaelmas was incredibly successful with the 1st IV+ winning the University IVs First Division and the 1st VIII winning the Fairbairn Cup for the first time in the history of the club. Blades in Lents followed and a further 3 places were gained in the Mays. The disappointment of missing blades on the final day was soon forgotten as the 1st VIII qualified to race in the Temple Challenge Cup at Henley Royal Regatta.

In 2023, King's M1 achieved their highest position on the river, reaching 4th on the river, surpassing their 1923 record of fifth.

== Honours ==
=== Boat Race representatives ===
The following rowers were part of the rowing club at the time of their participation in The Boat Race.

Men's boat race

Year	Name
1867	F. E. Cunningham
1887	J. R. Orford
1903	J. S. Carter
1924	J. S. Herbert
1925	J. S. Herbert
1925	A. G. Wansbrough
1947	P. J. Garner

Year	Name
1952	G. A. H. Cadbury
1952	G. T. Marshall
1953	G. T. Marshall
2022	Luca Ferraro
2023	Luca Ferraro
2024	Luca Ferraro

Women' boat race

Year	Name
2015	Fanny Belais
2021	Dylan Whitaker (cox)

== Alan Turing ==
Codebreaker and Computer Scientist Alan Turing (KC 1931) was an active member of the boat club throughout his university career. An accomplished runner and sailor, Turing was also a talented rower, winning a tankard for his performance in the 1931 King's Trial eights as a novice, and rowing in the 1934 (seat unknown) and 1935 (5 seat) trial VIIIs. His letters to family and friends often mention rowing; in a letter to Mr and Mrs Morcam (parents of Christopher Morcam) during his second term of first year, he writes:

"I shall be rowing, so will have to be rather abstinent on Friday evening. First day of Lents is to-morrow. Am quite excited about them already."

In the same year, in which he received only a second class in his exams, he wrote to Mr and Mrs Morcam, saying:

“I suppose you saw that I had only got a 2nd in 1st part of Maths. I can hardly look anyone in the face after it. I won’t try to offer an explanation. I shall just have to get a first in Mays to show I’m not really so bad as that.”

After his first year, the remaining records show Turing in more of a reserve role. In 1934, he was the first reserve for the Second VIII, although he could not row as the May Bumps conflicted with his finals, and his father was in hospital. John Patterson, a school friend of Turing's and then-captain, noted that it was "unfortunate" to lose Turing before the bumps races. Turing's most notable rowing achievement came in 1935, after he had technically retired from rowing. He (66 kg) replaced William Colles (83 kg) at five seat in the men's second VIII after Colles was injured in a brawl; the captain's log from that bumps campaign notes that on Day 3 they caught St Catharine’s IV just before the gut, and on day 4 “made short work of Peterhouse III just before the ditch.” This crew bumped on every day of the campaign, earning blades, one of which is currently on display in the Museum at Bletchley Park.

Turing's presence in the boat club beyond simply on the water is noted by Denis Williams, a university friend, who writes:

“Alan Turing was a year or so my senior at Cambridge and I think it was as members of the Boat Club that we first made each other’s acquaintance. Rowing is traditionally thought of as the sport of ‘toughs’, but at that time the King’s Boat Club was an odd mixture of those born tough and of intellectuals in search of a counter-irritant. Alan’s close friends were among the intellectuals, but I believe that a sport that demands the maximum of exertion held a natural attraction for him and there was a sterling quality about him which gained respect in any company…. .”

Williams furthers his observations with an anecdote:

“…I remember he once achieved a certain distinction by swallowing a pint (of beer) in one draught. This, he maintained, could not be done with water because the attempt made one disgusted with oneself.”

Turing himself credited his work on the Riemann Hypothesis to rowing for KCBC, a conjecture to which he introduced a number of important ideas. While he was rowing bow, fellow mathematician Stanley Skewes mentioned it to Turing, who in a letter claimed he "made the mistake of talking to me about it from time to time when you were rowing two and I at bow until eventually I thought I had better find out what it was all about.”
