= Lent Bumps 2018 =

The Lent Bumps 2018 was a series of rowing races at Cambridge University from Tuesday 27 February 2018 to Saturday 3 March 2018. The event was run as a bumps race and was the 131st set of races in the series of Lent Bumps which have been held annually in late February or early March since 1887. See Lent Bumps for the format of the races.

Due to adverse weather conditions caused by the so-called Beast from the East, racing had to be cancelled for some of the Wednesday and all of the Thursday. This was first time that racing had had to be cancelled since 2002, when the first day of racing was called off due to strong winds. Racing had also been cancelled in 2001, when the foot-and-mouth outbreak forced the closure of the towpath, and this was the first time that a cancellation was caused by ice since the Big Freeze of 1963. Although there was no ice on the river, compacted snow and ice had rendered the towpath extremely slippery, posing a danger to the umpires that cycle alongside the races to ensure safety. After some narrowly avoided injuries, racing was called off shortly before the M3 division on the Wednesday, and all racing was cancelled on the Thursday, followed by the cancellation of the W3 and M3 divisions on the Friday.

In response to the inability of either CUCBC (the body in charge of the organisation of the Bumps), the Conservators of the Cam or Cambridgeshire County Council to grit the towpath, a large-scale student effort was undertaken on the Thursday evening and the Friday morning to prepare the towpath for safe racing on the Friday. Over 150 kg (23 st) of salt was deployed by several dozen students from a range of clubs, and after a CUCBC inspection of the towpath on the Friday morning, the W2, M2, W1 and M1 divisions on the Friday and all racing on the final day was deemed safe to go ahead.

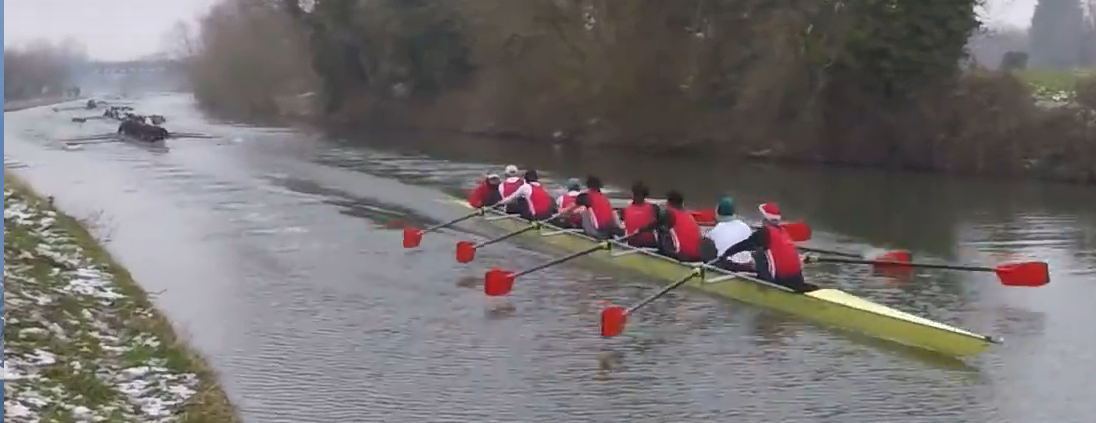
LMBC rowing over head of Lents, Saturday, 2018

== Head of the River crews ==
Lady Margaret rowed over in both of their races to retain the headship they won in 2017.

Jesus rowed over in both of their races to retain the headship they won in 2016.

== Highest 2nd VIIIs ==
Caius II rowed over three times, retaining their status as the highest placed men's second VIII at 4th position in the second division.

Jesus II rowed over three times to retain their position as the highest placed women's second VIII at 5th position in the second division.

== Links to races in other years ==
Preceding year	Current year	Following year
Lent Bumps 2017	Lent Bumps 2018	Lent Bumps 2019
May Bumps 2017	May Bumps 2018	May Bumps 2019

== Bumps Charts ==
Below are the bumps charts for all 4 men's and all 4 women's divisions, with the men's event on the left and women's event on the right. The bumps chart shows the progress of every crew over all four days of the racing. To follow the progress of any particular crew, find the crew's name on the left side of the chart and follow the line to the end-of-the-week finishing position on the right of the chart.

This chart may not be displayed correctly if you are using a large font size on your browser. A simple way to check is to see that the first horizontal bold line, marking the boundary between divisions, lies between positions 17 and 18.

Pos	Crew	Men's Bumps Chart	Crew	Pos	Crew	Women's Bumps Chart	Crew	Pos
1	Lady Margaret		Lady Margaret	1	Jesus		Jesus	1
2	Downing		Caius	2	Clare		Downing	2
3	Jesus		Downing	3	Downing		Newnham	3
4	Caius		Pembroke	4	Newnham		Clare	4
5	Pembroke		Jesus	5	1st & 3rd Trinity		Emmanuel	5
6	Peterhouse		Christ's	6	Christ's		Murray Edwards	6
7	Christ's		Robinson	7	Murray Edwards		1st & 3rd Trinity	7
8	1st & 3rd Trinity		Peterhouse	8	Emmanuel		Christ's	8
9	Robinson		Clare	9	Girton		Lady Margaret	9
10	Clare		1st & 3rd Trinity	10	Lady Margaret		Pembroke	10
11	Queens'		St. Catharine's	11	Pembroke		Girton	11
12	Girton		Queens'	12	Churchill		Churchill	12
13	St. Catharine's		Trinity Hall	13	St. Catharine's		Trinity Hall	13
14	Trinity Hall		Girton	14	Caius		St. Catharine's	14
15	Churchill		Churchill	15	Lucy Cavendish		Queens'	15
16	King's		Magdalene	16	Queens'		Caius	16
17	Fitzwilliam		King's	17	Trinity Hall		Lucy Cavendish	17
18	Magdalene		Emmanuel	18	King's		King's	18
19	Emmanuel		Fitzwilliam	19	Peterhouse		Fitzwilliam	19
20	Wolfson		Wolfson	20	Fitzwilliam		Homerton	20
21	Caius II		Caius II	21	Homerton		Peterhouse	21
22	Lady Margaret II		Corpus Christi	22	Jesus II		Jesus II	22
23	Jesus II		Lady Margaret II	23	Magdalene		Darwin	23
24	Corpus Christi		Jesus II	24	Emmanuel II		Emmanuel II	24
25	Homerton		Selwyn	25	Selwyn		Sidney Sussex	25
26	1st & 3rd Trinity II		1st & 3rd Trinity II	26	Darwin		Magdalene	26
27	Selwyn		St Edmund's	27	Sidney Sussex		Robinson	27
28	Downing II		Homerton	28	Robinson		Selwyn	28
29	Clare II		Darwin	29	Newnham II		Wolfson	29
30	St Edmund's		Sidney Sussex	30	Pembroke II		Newnham II	30
31	Darwin		Clare II	31	Wolfson		Lady Margaret II	31
32	Queens' II		Hughes Hall	32	Lady Margaret II		Hughes Hall	32
33	Sidney Sussex		Downing II	33	Clare II		Pembroke II	33
34	Pembroke II		Pembroke II	34	Christ's II		Clare II	34
35	Hughes Hall		Queens' II	35	Hughes Hall		Corpus Christi	35
36	Christ's II		Christ's II	36	Corpus Christi		Christ's II	36
37	Emmanuel II		Robinson II	37	Queens' II		St. Catharine's II	37
38	Robinson II		Emmanuel II	38	St Edmund's		St Edmund's	38
39	St. Catharine's II		St. Catharine's II	39	1st & 3rd Trinity II		1st & 3rd Trinity II	39
40	1st & 3rd Trinity III		1st & 3rd Trinity III	40	Jesus III		Jesus III	40
41	Magdalene II		Magdalene II	41	Murray Edwards II		Downing II	41
42	Lady Margaret III		Trinity Hall II	42	St. Catharine's II		Queens' II	42
43	Trinity Hall II		Lady Margaret III	43	Downing II		King's II	43
44	Clare Hall		Clare Hall	44	Darwin II		Murray Edwards II	44
45	Churchill II		Jesus III	45	King's II		Caius II	45
46	Jesus III		Clare III	46	Caius II		Trinity Hall II	46
47	Peterhouse II		Churchill II	47	Newnham III		Darwin II	47
48	Clare III		Fitzwilliam II	48	Trinity Hall II		Lady Margaret III	48
49	Fitzwilliam II		Peterhouse II	49	Clare III		Lucy Cavendish II	49
50	King's II		King's II	50	Lady Margaret III		Newnham III	50
51	Queens' III		Caius III	51	Murray Edwards III		Clare III	51
52	Sidney Sussex II		Queens' III	52	Lucy Cavendish II		Sidney Sussex II	52
53	St. Catharine's III		Sidney Sussex II	53	Queens' III		Emmanuel III	53
54	Caius III		Caius IV	54	Sidney Sussex II		Murray Edwards III	54
55	Caius IV		St. Catharine's III	55	Homerton II		Queens' III	55
56	St Edmund's II		Wolfson II	56	Emmanuel III		Pembroke III	56
57	Downing III		St Edmund's II	57	Pembroke III		Homerton II	57
58	Wolfson II		Downing III	58				
59	Pembroke III		Hughes Hall II	59				
60	Trinity Hall III		Trinity Hall III	60				
61	Queens' IV		Pembroke III	61				
62	Hughes Hall II		Queens' IV	62				
63	Homerton II		Homerton II	63				
