= May Bumps 2018 =

Rowing race series at Cambridge University

The May Bumps 2018 were a set of rowing races at Cambridge University from Wednesday 13 June 2018 to Saturday 16 June 2018. The event was run as a bumps race and was the 127th set of races in the series of May Bumps which have been held annually in mid-June in this form since 1887.

The 2018 May Bumps saw the first ever quadruple overbump in the men's divisions, which involved Magdalene IV bumping Lady Margaret IV on the second day, having started nine stations (21½ lengths) behind them.

== Head of the River crews ==
Lady Margaret men rowed over on all four days to retain the headship they won in 2016.

Jesus women rowed over on all four days to retain the headship they won in 2017.

== Highest 2nd VIIIs ==
Lady Margaret II rowed over for three days before being bumped by Wolfson on the final day, finishing as the highest placed men's second VIII at 17th in the first division.

Despite being bumped on every day of the campaign, Jesus II retained their status as the highest placed women's second VIII, finishing 3rd overall in the W2 division. Jesus were bumped by Homerton, St. Catharine's, Trinity Hall, and King's.

== Links to races in other years ==
Preceding year	Current year	Following year
May Bumps 2017	May Bumps 2018	May Bumps 2019
Lent Bumps 2017	Lent Bumps 2018	Lent Bumps 2019

== Bumps Charts ==
Below are the bumps charts for all 5 men's and all 4 women's divisions, with the men's event on the left and women's event on the right. The bumps chart shows the progress of every crew over all four days of the racing. To follow the progress of any particular crew, find the crew's name on the left side of the chart and follow the line to the end-of-the-week finishing position on the right of the chart.

This chart may not be displayed correctly if you are using a large font size on your browser. A simple way to check is to see that the first horizontal bold line, marking the boundary between divisions, lies between positions 17 and 18.

Pos	Crew	Men's Bumps Chart	Crew	Pos	Crew	Women's Bumps Chart	Crew	Pos
1	Lady Margaret		Lady Margaret	1	Jesus		Jesus	1
2	Clare		Clare	2	Emmanuel		Newnham	2
3	Caius		Pembroke	3	Caius		Emmanuel	3
4	Pembroke		Caius	4	Newnham		Downing	4
5	Downing		Magdalene	5	Downing		Caius	5
6	Peterhouse		Downing	6	Lady Margaret		Clare	6
7	Emmanuel		Emmanuel	7	Clare		Lady Margaret	7
8	Jesus		1st & 3rd Trinity	8	Christ's		Girton	8
9	Magdalene		Jesus	9	Girton		Churchill	9
10	1st & 3rd Trinity		Peterhouse	10	1st & 3rd Trinity		1st & 3rd Trinity	10
11	Selwyn		Queens'	11	Peterhouse		Pembroke	11
12	Queens'		King's	12	Churchill		Christ's	12
13	Robinson		Robinson	13	Fitzwilliam		Fitzwilliam	13
14	Christ's		Christ's	14	Pembroke		Homerton	14
15	King's		Selwyn	15	Queens'		Peterhouse	15
16	Lady Margaret II		Wolfson	16	Jesus II		St. Catharine's	16
17	Churchill		Lady Margaret II	17	Homerton		Queens'	17
18	Girton		Girton	18	Magdalene		Trinity Hall	18
19	St. Catharine's		Churchill	19	St. Catharine's		King's	19
20	Wolfson		Homerton	20	Trinity Hall		Jesus II	20
21	Homerton		Trinity Hall	21	King's		Darwin	21
22	Fitzwilliam		St. Catharine's	22	Newnham II		Magdalene	22
23	St Edmund's		Hughes Hall	23	Murray Edwards		Lucy Cavendish	23
24	Hughes Hall		St Edmund's	24	Darwin		Wolfson	24
25	1st & 3rd Trinity		Fitzwilliam	25	Lucy Cavendish		Newnham II	25
26	Corpus Christi		Corpus Christi	26	Selwyn		Emmanuel II	26
27	Caius II		Caius II	27	Pembroke II		Murray Edwards	27
28	Downing II		Sidney Sussex	28	Wolfson		Sidney Sussex	28
29	Jesus II		Pembroke II	29	Robinson		Selwyn	29
30	Sidney Sussex		Darwin	30	Emmanuel II		Pembroke II	30
31	1st & 3rd Trinity II		Downing II	31	Sidney Sussex		Downing II	31
32	Pembroke II		Jesus II	32	Downing II		Corpus Christi	32
33	Darwin		Emmanuel II	33	Corpus Christi		Robinson	33
34	Clare II		1st & 3rd Trinity II	34	Queens' II		Lady Margaret II	34
35	Queens' II		Clare II	35	Clare II		Queens' II	35
36	St. Catharine's II		Christ's II	36	Caius II		Caius II	36
37	Lady Margaret III		Queens' II	37	Lady Margaret II		Clare II	37
38	Churchill II		Robinson II	38	Newnham III		Trinity Hall II	38
39	Peterhouse II		St. Catharine's II	39	Trinity Hall II		Hughes Hall	39
40	Emmanuel II		Magdalene II	40	St Edmund's		St Edmund's	40
41	Robinson II		Lady Margaret III	41	Murray Edwards II		St. Catharine's II	41
42	Trinity Hall II		Trinity Hall II	42	Hughes Hall		Newnham III	42
43	Magdalene II		Peterhouse II	43	Christ's II		Emmanuel III	43
44	Queens' III		Jesus III	44	St. Catharine's II		Pembroke III	44
45	Fitzwilliam II		Churchill II	45	Emmanuel III		Murray Edwards II	45
46	Churchill II		Queens' III	46	Jesus III		Darwin II	46
47	Jesus III		Fitzwilliam II	47	Pembroke III		Christ's II	47
48	Selwyn II		Emmanuel III	48	King's II		Homerton II	48
49	1st & 3rd Trinity III		Clare III	49	Darwin II		Jesus III	49
50	Clare III		Wolfson II	50	Clare III		Clare III	50
51	Corpus Christi II		Selwyn II	51	Homerton II		King's II	51
52	Emmanuel III		Caius III	52	Fitzwilliam II		Lucy Cavendish II	52
53	Girton II		1st & 3rd Trinity III	53	Queens' III		St. Catharine's III	53
54	Darwin II		Clare Hall	54	Lucy Cavendish II		Queens' III	54
55	Caius III		Corpus Christi II	55	Lady Margaret III		Caius III	55
56	King's II		Hughes Hall II	56	St. Catharine's III		Fitzwilliam II	56
57	Hughes Hall II		King's II	57	Magdalene II		Sidney Sussex II	57
58	Wolfson II		Pembroke III	58	Caius III		Clare IV	58
59	Anglia Ruskin		Darwin II	59	Sidney Sussex II		Lady Margaret III	59
60	Clare Hall		Anglia Ruskin	60	Clare IV		Trinity Hall III	60
61	St. Catharine's III		Girton II	61	Emmanuel IV		Magdalene II	61
62	Pembroke III		Sidney Sussex II	62	Darwin III		Pembroke IV	62
63	Sidney Sussex II		St Edmund's II	63	Pembroke IV		Darwin III	63
64	St Edmund's II		Trinity Hall III	64	Trinity Hall III		Trinity Hall IV	64
65	1st & 3rd Trinity IV		St. Catharine's III	65	Wolfson II		St. Catharine's IV	65
66	Homerton II		Churchill III	66	Queens' IV		Emmanuel IV	66
67	Magdalene III		Homerton II	67	Trinity Hall IV		Wolfson II	67
68	Churchill III		1st & 3rd Trinity IV	68	Homerton III		Queens' IV	68
69	Queens' IV		Downing III	69	St. Catharine's IV		Homerton III	69
70	Trinity Hall III		Christ's III	70				
71	Downing III		Magdalene III	71				
72	Christ's III		Jesus IV	72				
73	Jesus IV		Queens' IV	73				
74	Clare IV		Magdalene IV	74				
75	Pembroke IV		Clare IV	75				
76	Lady Margaret IV		Emmanuel IV	76				
77	Corpus Christi III		Corpus Christi III	77				
78	Lady Margaret V		Jesus V	78				
79	Emmanuel IV		Pembroke IV	79				
80	Queens' V		Fitzwilliam III	80				
81	Trinity Hall IV		Lady Margaret V	81				
82	Jesus V		Queens' V	82				
83	Fitzwilliam III		Lady Margaret IV	83				
84	Trinity Hall V		Trinity Hall IV	84				
85	Magdalene IV		Trinity Hall V	85				
