= Lent Bumps 2014 =

The Lent Bumps 2014 was a series of rowing races at Cambridge University from Tuesday 25 February 2014 to Saturday 1 March 2014. The event was run as a bumps race and was the 127th set of races in the series of Lent Bumps which have been held annually in late February or early March since 1887. See Lent Bumps for the format of the races. 103 crews took part (57 men's crews and 46 women's crews), with nearly 950 participants in total.

== Head of the River crews ==
Downing men bumped Caius on day 1, then rowed over head for the next three days, claiming the Lents headship for the first time since 1998.

1st & 3rd Trinity women bumped Downing on day 2 to reclaim the Lent headship they lost to Downing in 2011.

== Highest 2nd VIIIs ==
Despite finishing down 2 places, Caius II remained the highest placed men's second VIII.

Christ's II finished as the highest placed women's second VIII, bumping Emmanuel II on day 1 and Lady Margaret II on day 2, before rowing over the final two days to finish 6th in the division.

== Links to races in other years ==
Preceding year	Current year	Following year
Lent Bumps 2013	Lent Bumps 2014	Lent Bumps 2015
May Bumps 2013	May Bumps 2014	May Bumps 2015

== Bumps Charts ==
Below are the bumps charts for all 4 men's and all 3 women's divisions, with the men's event on the left and women's event on the right. The bumps chart shows the progress of every crew over all four days of the racing. To follow the progress of any particular crew, find the crew's name on the left side of the chart and follow the line to the end-of-the-week finishing position on the right of the chart.

This chart may not be displayed correctly if you are using a large font size on your browser. A simple way to check is to see that the first horizontal bold line, marking the boundary between divisions, lies between positions 17 and 18.

Pos	Crew	Men's Bumps Chart	Crew	Pos	Crew	Women's Bumps Chart	Crew	Pos
1	Caius		Downing	1	Downing		1st & 3rd Trinity	1
2	Downing		Caius	2	1st & 3rd Trinity		Emmanuel	2
3	Queens'		Jesus	3	Jesus		Downing	3
4	1st & 3rd Trinity		Lady Margaret	4	Emmanuel		Christ's	4
5	Jesus		Pembroke	5	Christ's		Clare	5
6	Lady Margaret		Queens'	6	Pembroke		Jesus	6
7	Peterhouse		Christ's	7	Newnham		Caius	7
8	Pembroke		1st & 3rd Trinity	8	Caius		St. Catharine's	8
9	Christ's		St. Catharine's	9	Clare		Queens'	9
10	Girton		Peterhouse	10	St. Catharine's		Newnham	10
11	Clare		Girton	11	Queens'		Murray Edwards	11
12	Trinity Hall		King's	12	King's		Pembroke	12
13	St. Catharine's		Clare	13	Lady Margaret		Lady Margaret	13
14	King's		Robinson	14	Murray Edwards		Peterhouse	14
15	Robinson		Emmanuel	15	Trinity Hall		Churchill	15
16	Selwyn		Trinity Hall	16	Peterhouse		King's	16
17	Magdalene		Magdalene	17	Churchill		Girton	17
18	Caius II		Selwyn	18	Selwyn		Trinity Hall	18
19	Emmanuel		Fitzwilliam	19	Magdalene		Selwyn	19
20	Fitzwilliam		Caius II	20	Girton		Homerton	20
21	Churchill		Churchill	21	Fitzwilliam		Magdalene	21
22	Downing II		Downing II	22	Lady Margaret II		Fitzwilliam	22
23	Homerton II		Jesus II	23	Homerton		Christ's II	23
24	1st & 3rd Trinity II		Lady Margaret II	24	Emmanuel II		Hughes Hall	24
25	Jesus II		Homerton	25	Christ's II		Lady Margaret II	25
26	Lady Margaret II		Queens' II	26	Sidney Sussex		Sidney Sussex	26
27	Queens' II		Wolfson	27	Jesus II		Emmanuel II	27
28	Sidney Sussex		1st & 3rd Trinity II	28	Hughes Hall		Newnham II	28
29	Christ's II		Sidney Sussex	29	Newnham II		Robinson	29
30	Wolfson		Corpus Christi	30	Robinson		Jesus II	30
31	Pembroke II		Darwin	31	1st & 3rd Trinity II		Corpus Christi	31
32	Darwin		St Edmund's	32	Pembroke II		Darwin	32
33	Corpus Christi II		Christ's II	33	St Edmund's		Pembroke II	33
34	Anglia Ruskin		Pembroke II	34	Corpus Christi		1st & 3rd Trinity II	34
35	Hughes Hall		St. Catharine's II	35	Darwin		Peterhouse II	35
36	Emmanuel II		Hughes Hall	36	Caius II		Clare II	36
37	St Edmund's		Emmanuel II	37	Peterhouse II		St Edmund's	37
38	Peterhouse II		Anglia Ruskin	38	Murray Edwards II		Wolfson	38
39	Selwyn II		Peterhouse II	39	Clare II		Murray Edwards II	39
40	Clare II		Clare II	40	Wolfson		Caius II	40
41	St. Catharine's II		Churchill II	41	Clare Hall		Sidney Sussex II	41
42	Churchill II		1st & 3rd Trinity II	42	Sidney Sussex II		Queens' II	42
43	Magdalene II		Selwyn II	43	Queens' II		St. Catharine's II	43
44	1st & 3rd Trinity III		Clare Hall	44	St. Catharine's II		Murray Edwards III	44
45	Caius III		Magdalene II	45	Darwin II		Clare Hall	45
46	Queens' III		Robinson II	46	Murray Edwards II		Darwin II	46
47	Clare Hall		Lady Margaret III	47				
48	Robinson II		Darwin II	48				
49	Lady Margaret III		Churchill III	49				
50	Corpus Christi II		Caius III	50				
51	Darwin II		Magdalene III	51				
52	Churchill III		Queens' III	52				
53	Magdalene III		Pembroke III	53				
54	Lady Margaret IV		Corpus Christi II	54				
55	Pembroke III		Wolfson II	55				
56	St Edmund's II		St Edmund's II	56				
57	Wolfson II		Lady Margaret IV	57				

== The Getting-on Race ==
The Getting-on Race allows a number of crews which did not already have a place from last year's races to compete for the right to race this year.

The 2014 Lent Bumps Getting-on Race took place on 21 February 2014.

=== Competing crews ===
==== Men ====
34 men's crews raced for 17 available spaces at the bottom of the 3rd division, and the top of the 4th division. The following were successful and rowed in the bumps.

- Clare II
- St. Catharine's II
- Churchill II
- Magdalene II
- 1st & 3rd Trinity III
- Caius III
- Queens' III
- Robinson II
- Lady Margaret III
- Corpus Christi II
- Darwin II
- Churchill III
- Magdalene III
- Lady Margaret IV
- Pembroke III
- St Edmund's II
- Wolfson II

The following were unsuccessful.

- King's III
- 1st & 3rd Trinity IV
- Queens' IV
- Robinson III
- Hughes Hall II
- Emmanuel III
- Trinity Hall II
- Christ's III
- Fitzwilliam II
- King's II
- St. Catharine's III
- Jesus III
- Robinson IV
- Girton II
- Hughes Hall III
- Caius IV
- Jesus IV

==== Women ====
16 women's crews raced for 8 available spaces at the bottom of the 3rd division. The following were successful and rowed in the bumps. The combined Hughes Hall/Lucy Cavendish women's crew is listed as Lucy Cavendish only.

- Peterhouse II
- Murray Edwards II
- Clare II
- Sidney Sussex II
- Queens' II
- St. Catharine's II
- Murray Edwards III

The following were unsuccessful.

- Selwyn II
- King's II
- Trinity Hall II
- Christ's III
- Fitzwilliam II
- Lucy Cavendish II
- Girton II
- Jesus III
