= May Bumps 2014 =

Rowing races at Cambridge University

The May Bumps 2014 were a set of rowing races at Cambridge University from Wednesday 11 June 2014 to Saturday 14 June 2014. The event was run as a bumps race and was the 123rd set of races in the series of May Bumps which have been held annually in mid-June in this form since 1887.

== Head of the River crews ==
Caius rowed over on all four days to retain the headship they won in 2011.

Downing women bumped Clare on day 1 to regain the headship.

== Highest 2nd VIIIs ==
Lady Margaret II bumped Caius II on the final day to become the highest placed men's second VIII.

Jesus II rose 6 places to finish as the highest placed women's second VIII, 2nd overall in the W2 division. Jesus overbumped Pembroke II on day 1, and then bumped Fitzwilliam, Magdalene, and King's.

== Links to races in other years ==
Preceding year	Current year	Following year
May Bumps 2013	May Bumps 2014	May Bumps 2015
Lent Bumps 2013	Lent Bumps 2014	Lent Bumps 2015

== Bumps Charts ==
Below are the bumps charts for all 6 men's and all 4 women's divisions, with the men's event on the left and women's event on the right. The bumps chart shows the progress of every crew over all four days of the racing. To follow the progress of any particular crew, find the crew's name on the left side of the chart and follow the line to the end-of-the-week finishing position on the right of the chart.

This chart may not be displayed correctly if you are using a large font size on your browser. A simple way to check is to see that the first horizontal bold line, marking the boundary between divisions, lies between positions 17 and 18.

Pos	Crew	Men's Bumps Chart	Crew	Pos	Crew	Women's Bumps Chart	Crew	Pos
1	Caius		Caius	1	Clare		Downing	1
2	Downing		Downing	2	Downing		Caius	2
3	Lady Margaret		Lady Margaret	3	Jesus		Emmanuel	3
4	Jesus		Jesus	4	Emmanuel		Clare	4
5	St. Catharine's		Pembroke	5	Caius		Jesus	5
6	1st & 3rd Trinity		1st & 3rd Trinity	6	Newnham		1st & 3rd Trinity	6
7	Pembroke		St. Catharine's	7	1st & 3rd Trinity		Newnham	7
8	Queens'		Queens'	8	Pembroke		Lady Margaret	8
9	Clare		Clare	9	Christ's		Queens'	9
10	King's		King's	10	Lady Margaret		Christ's	10
11	Christ's		Christ's	11	Queens'		Girton	11
12	Emmanuel		Emmanuel	12	St. Catharine's		Pembroke	12
13	Fitzwilliam		Peterhouse	13	Peterhouse		Peterhouse	13
14	Girton		Fitzwilliam	14	Trinity Hall		St. Catharine's	14
15	Peterhouse		Churchill	15	Girton		Churchill	15
16	Homerton		Magdalene	16	Churchill		Selwyn	16
17	Churchill		Girton	17	Selwyn		Murray Edwards	17
18	Magdalene		Selwyn	18	King's		Trinity Hall	18
19	Selwyn		Robinson	19	Magdalene		Jesus II	19
20	Trinity Hall		Homerton	20	Murray Edwards		King's	20
21	Robinson		St Edmund's	21	Fitzwilliam		Darwin	21
22	Caius II		Trinity Hall	22	Pembroke II		Magdalene	22
23	Lady Margaret II		Lady Margaret II	23	Sidney Sussex		Emmanuel II	23
24	St Edmund's		Caius II	24	Darwin		Fitzwilliam	24
25	Downing II		Jesus II	25	Jesus II		Newnham II	25
26	Christ's II		Downing II	26	Emmanuel II		Sidney Sussex	26
27	1st & 3rd Trinity II		Hughes Hall	27	Newnham II		Homerton	27
28	Queens' II		Christ's II	28	Robinson		Pembroke II	28
29	Jesus II		Darwin	29	Clare II		Wolfson	29
30	Sidney Sussex		1st & 3rd Trinity II	30	Homerton		Robinson	30
31	Hughes Hall		Wolfson	31	Lady Margaret II		Queens' II	31
32	Pembroke II		Queens' II	32	Downing II		Clare II	32
33	Darwin		Sidney Sussex	33	Wolfson		Hughes Hall	33
34	Wolfson		Corpus Christi	34	Christ's II		Lady Margaret II	34
35	Corpus Christi		St. Catharine's II	35	Caius		Downing II	35
36	St. Catharine's II		Pembroke II	36	Queens' II		Corpus Christi II	36
37	Clare II		Emmanuel II	37	Hughes Hall		Christ's II	37
38	Emmanuel II		Clare II	38	Magdalene II		Caius II	38
39	Selwyn II		Peterhouse II	39	Corpus Christi		Trinity Hall II	39
40	Peterhouse II		Selwyn II	40	St. Catharine's II		Murray Edwards II	40
41	1st & 3rd Trinity III		Lady Margaret III	41	Trinity Hall II		Selwyn II	41
42	Girton II		1st & 3rd Trinity III	42	Girton II		Magdalene II	42
43	Trinity Hall II		Robinson II	43	Murray Edwards II		Emmanuel II	43
44	Lady Margaret III		Trinity Hall II	44	Selwyn II		St. Catharine's II	44
45	Queens' III		Churchill II	45	Emmanuel III		Girton II	45
46	Emmanuel III		Girton II	46	Pembroke III		1st & 3rd Trinity II	46
47	Robinson II		Queens' III	47	Newnham III		Anglia Ruskin	47
48	Churchill II		Magdalene II	48	1st & 3rd Trinity II		Newnham III	48
49	Magdalene II		Emmanuel III	49	Fitzwilliam II		Jesus III	49
50	Clare III		Clare Hall	50	Clare Hall		Pembroke III	50
51	Fitzwilliam II		Jesus III	51	Anglia Ruskin		Fitzwilliam II	51
52	Clare Hall		King's II	52	Jesus III		Sidney Sussex II	52
53	King's II		Clare III	53	Sidney Sussex II		Homerton	53
54	Caius III		Fitzwilliam II	54	Homerton II		Clare Hall	54
55	Jesus III		Darwin II	55	Peterhouse II		Murray Edwards III	55
56	Downing III		Caius III	56	Murray Edwards III		Hughes Hall II	56
57	St. Catharine's III		St. Catharine's III	57	Clare III		Clare III	57
58	Darwin II		St Edmund's II	58	Queens' III		Darwin II	58
59	Selwyn III		Corpus Christi II	59	Hughes Hall II		Peterhouse II	59
60	Wolfson II		Downing III	60	Selwyn III		Selwyn III	60
61	Corpus Christi II		Wolfson II	61	Lady Margaret III		Queens' III	61
62	Homerton II		Hughes Hall II	62	Darwin II		Christ's III	62
63	Christ's III		Selwyn III	63	Christ's III		Lady Margaret III	63
64	St Edmund's II		Homerton II	64				
65	Trinity Hall III		Sidney Sussex II	65				
66	Hughes Hall II		Christ's III	66				
67	1st & 3rd Trinity IV		Magdalene III	67				
68	Jesus IV		Jesus IV	68				
69	Queens' IV		Trinity Hall III	69				
70	Magdalene III		1st & 3rd Trinity IV	70				
71	Sidney Sussex II		Queens' IV	71				
72	King's III		King's III	72				
73	Jesus V		Corpus Christi III	73				
74	Clare IV		Jesus V	74				
75	Darwin III		Pembroke III	75				
76	Emmanuel IV		Darwin III	76				
77	Corpus Christi III		Churchill III	77				
78	Emmanuel V		Clare IV	78				
79	Homerton III		Hughes Hall III	79				
80	Churchill III		Emmanuel V	80				
81	Hughes Hall III		Emmanuel IV	81				
82	St. Catharine's IV		St. Catharine's IV	82				
83	Pembroke III		Homerton III	83				
84	St. Catharine's V		Pembroke IV	84				
85	Clare Hall II		Lady Margaret IV	85				
86	Pembroke IV		St. Catharine's V	86				
87	Churchill IV		Lady Margaret V	87				
88	Lady Margaret IV		Pembroke IV	88				
89	Pembroke IV		Clare Hall II	89				
90	Lady Margaret V		Churchill IV	90				
91	St. Catharine's VI		St. Catharine's VI	91				

== The Getting-on Race ==
The Getting-on Race allows a number of crews which did not already have a place from last year's races to compete for the right to race this year.

The 2014 May Bumps Getting-on Race took place on 6 June 2014.

=== Competing crews ===
==== Men ====
15 men's crews raced for 9 available spaces at the bottom of the 5th division, and the top of the 6th division. The following were successful and rowed in the bumps.

- Pembroke III
- Darwin IV
- St. Catharine's VI
- Clare Hall II
- Pembroke IV
- Churchill IV
- Lady Margaret IV
- Pembroke VI
- Lady Margaret V

The following were unsuccessful.

- St. Catharine's V
- Robinson III
- Lady Margaret VI
- Wolfson III
- Christ's V
- Pembroke V

==== Women ====
20 women's crews raced for 10 available spaces in the 4th division. The following were successful and rowed in the bumps. The combined Hughes Hall/Lucy Cavendish women's crew is listed as Lucy Cavendish only.

- Homerton II
- Peterhouse II
- Murray Edwards III
- Clare III
- Queens' III
- Lucy Cavendish II
- Selwyn IV (Became Selwyn III)
- Lady Margaret III
- Darwin II
- Christ's III

The following were unsuccessful.

- Newnham IV
- King's II
- Corpus Christi II
- Selwyn III
- Pembroke IV
- Emmanuel IV
- Clare V
- Clare IV
- Pembroke V
- Sidney Sussex III
