= May Bumps 2017 =

Rowing races at Cambridge University

The May Bumps 2017 were a set of rowing races at Cambridge University from Wednesday 14 June 2017 to Saturday 17 June 2017. The event was run as a bumps race and was the 126th set of races in the series of May Bumps which have been held annually in mid-June in this form since 1887.

== Head of the River crews ==
Lady Margaret rowed over on all four nights to retain the headship they won in 2016.

Jesus rowed over on the first night before bumping Downing and Caius, and then rowed over on the final night to claim the women's headship for the first time since 2008. Caius had claimed headship from Downing on the first night before being bumped by Jesus on the third night.

== Highest 2nd VIIIs ==
After rowing over on the first night, Lady Margaret II bumped Girton, St. Catharine's and Christ's, ascending to 16th position in the first division.

Despite rowing over on the first night and being bumped by Peterhouse, Fitzwilliam and Queens', Jesus II remained the highest second women's boat at 16th in the first division.

== Links to races in other years ==
| Preceding year | Current year | Following year |
|---|---|---|
| May Bumps 2016 | May Bumps 2017 | May Bumps 2018 |
| Lent Bumps 2016 | Lent Bumps 2017 | Lent Bumps 2018 |
