= May Bumps 2015 =

Rowing races at Cambridge University

The May Bumps 2015 were a set of rowing races at Cambridge University from Wednesday 10 June 2015 to Saturday 13 June 2015. The event was run as a bumps race and was the 124th set of races in the series of May Bumps which have been held annually in mid-June in this form since 1887.

== Head of the River crews ==
Caius rowed over on all four days to retain the headship they won in 2011.

Downing women rowed over on all four days to retain the headship for a second year.

== Highest 2nd VIIIs ==
Lady Margaret II remained the highest placed men's second VIII, bumping Caius II back on the final day after being bumped on the previous day.

Jesus II rose 5 places to remain the highest placed women's second VIII, 14th overall in the W1 division. Jesus bumped Trinity Hall on day 1, and then bumped Murray Edwards as sandwich boat to move into the first division, where they bumped Selwyn, and St. Catharine's and Peterhouse.

== Links to races in other years ==
Preceding year	Current year	Following year
May Bumps 2014	May Bumps 2015	May Bumps 2016
Lent Bumps 2014	Lent Bumps 2015	Lent Bumps 2016
