= Lent Bumps 2015 =

The Lent Bumps 2015 was a series of rowing races at Cambridge University from Wednesday 25 February 2015 to Saturday 28 February 2015. The event was run as a bumps race and was the 128th set of races in the series of Lent Bumps which have been held annually in late February or early March since 1887. See Lent Bumps for the format of the races.

The 2015 Lent Bumps saw CUCBC deciding to cut one division's worth of places (two thirds of the M4 division and one third of the W3 division) compared to recent years. This caused some controversy amongst the college boat clubs. Ultimately the division was not reinstated and as a result the bumps ran over only 4 days (from Wednesday to Saturday), not 5 days (from Tuesday) as in previous years.

== Head of the River crews ==
Caius men bumped Downing on day 2, then rowed over head for the next three days to reclaim the Lents headship which they had most recently held from 2011 to 2013.

Christ's women bumped up three places to claim headship: Downing on day 1, 1st & 3rd Trinity on day 2, and Emmanuel on day 3. This was the first time Christ's women had been head of the river of either Lent or May bumps.

== Highest 2nd VIIIs ==
Caius II remained the highest placed men's second VIII.

Emmanuel II finished as the highest placed women's second VIII, bumping Lady Margaret II on day 2 and Christ's II on day 3, finishing 8th in the division.

== Links to races in other years ==
Preceding year	Current year	Following year
Lent Bumps 2014	Lent Bumps 2015	Lent Bumps 2016
May Bumps 2014	May Bumps 2015	May Bumps 2016
