= Lent Bumps 2017 =

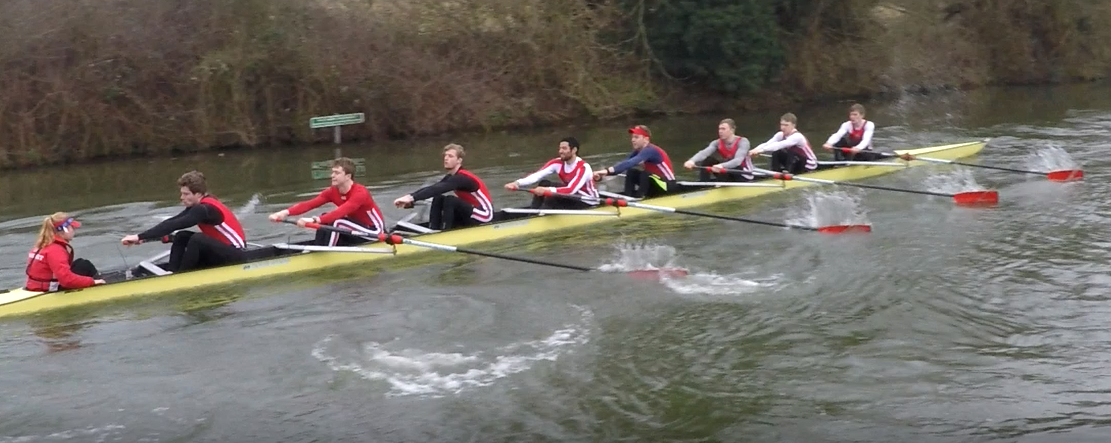
Lady Margaret M1 just after the start on day 3.

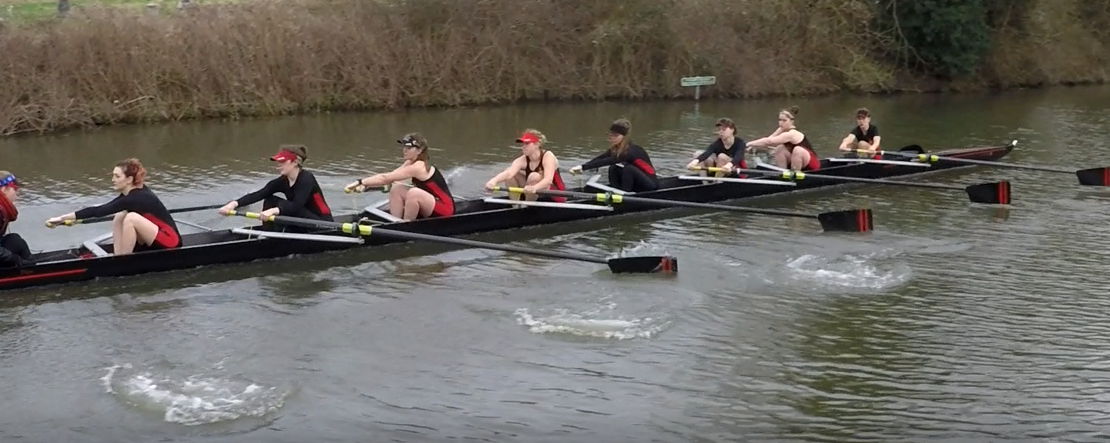
Jesus W1 just after the start on day 3.

The Lent Bumps 2017 was a series of rowing races at Cambridge University from Tuesday 28 February 2017 to Saturday 4 March 2017. The event was run as a bumps race and was the 130th set of races in the series of Lent Bumps which have been held annually in late February or early March since 1887. See Lent Bumps for the format of the races.

== Head of the River crews ==
Lady Margaret men, starting fourth, became head on day 3, bumping Pembroke on day 1, Caius on day 2, and Downing on day 3 after a rudder failure forced Downing to stop racing just after Ditton Corner. Downing had bumped Caius on day 1, and rowed over as head on day 2. Clare won blades, rising to 10th.

Jesus women retained their headship won in 2016. Clare won blades, rising to second place.

== Links to races in other years ==
Preceding year	Current year	Following year
Lent Bumps 2016	Lent Bumps 2017	Lent Bumps 2018
May Bumps 2016	May Bumps 2017	May Bumps 2018
