= May Bumps 2016 =

Rowing races at Cambridge University

The May Bumps 2016 were a set of rowing races at Cambridge University from Wednesday 8 June 2016 to Saturday 11 June 2016. The event was run as a bumps race and was the 125th set of races in the series of May Bumps which have been held annually in mid-June in this form since 1887.

== Head of the River crews ==
Lady Margaret bumps Pembroke on day 1 to go second, rowed over behind Caius on days 2 and 3, and caught Caius on day 4 halfway down the Long Reach.

Downing women rowed over on all four days to retain the headship for a third year.

== Highest 2nd VIIIs ==
Lady Margaret II remained the highest placed men's second VIII, and won blades.

Jesus II bumped Queens' on day 1 to remain the highest second boat, and the only second boat in a first division.

== Links to races in other years ==
Preceding year	Current year	Following year
May Bumps 2015	May Bumps 2016	May Bumps 2017
Lent Bumps 2015	Lent Bumps 2016	Lent Bumps 2017
