= Lent Bumps 2016 =

The Lent Bumps 2016 was a series of rowing races at Cambridge University from Tuesday 23 February 2016 to Saturday 27 February 2016. The event was run as a bumps race and was the 129th set of races in the series of Lent Bumps which have been held annually in late February or early March since 1887. See Lent Bumps for the format of the races.

== Head of the River crews ==
Caius men rowed over as head of the river for all four days and keep their Lent headship from 2015.

Jesus women bumped up on the first two days and rowed over the next two days. They last claimed their headship in the 1980s.

== Links to races in other years ==
Preceding year	Current year	Following year
Lent Bumps 2015	Lent Bumps 2016	Lent Bumps 2017
May Bumps 2015	May Bumps 2016	May Bumps 2017
