= Bumps race =

Form of rowing race

A 'bump' during Torpids at the University of Oxford, 1999: Jesus College Men's 1st VIII catch Hertford College

A bumps race is a form of rowing race in which a number of boats chase each other in single file, each crew attempting to catch and 'bump' the boat in front without being caught by the boat behind.

The form is mainly used in intercollegiate competitions at the University of Oxford since 1815, and at the University of Cambridge since 1827.

Bumps racing in eights is also found in the United Hospitals Boat Club in London between the five London medical schools and Royal Veterinary College.

Bumps racing in fours is also the format of inter-house rowing at Eton College and Shrewsbury School. It is particularly suitable where the stretch of water available is long but narrow, precluding side-by-side racing. Bumps racing gives a sharper feel of immediate competition than a head race, where boats are simply timed over a fixed course. Few rowers worldwide use rivers as narrow as the Cam or the Isis, but bumps races are also contested elsewhere.

== Origins and history ==
The first attested bumps race, and the first attested race between two clubs anywhere in the world, took place in Oxford in 1815. This was between two eights from Brasenose College and Jesus College. The fact that the racing was conducted in eight-oared boats gave rise to the event being known as Eights. The practice began with the two colleges racing upstream from Iffley Lock to a finishing line just short of Folly Bridge. The crews began one behind the other in the lock, each having to push their way out of the lock before being able to commence racing. This created an inevitable gap between boats, with the one behind trying to bump the one in front to claim victory. The boat in front could claim to be "Head of the River" if they avoided being bumped. As the number of crews contesting races increased, races no longer started in the lock, and instead were started from the bank upstream of the lock. This first occurred in 1825 or 1826.

Twelve years after bumps racing began in Oxford, Lent Bumps racing commenced at Cambridge University in 1827.

At Oxford, an additional bumping regatta, known as Torpids, was begun in 1838. This regatta was originally for men who had not rowed in Eights, nor in a university crew.

== Racing practice and procedures ==
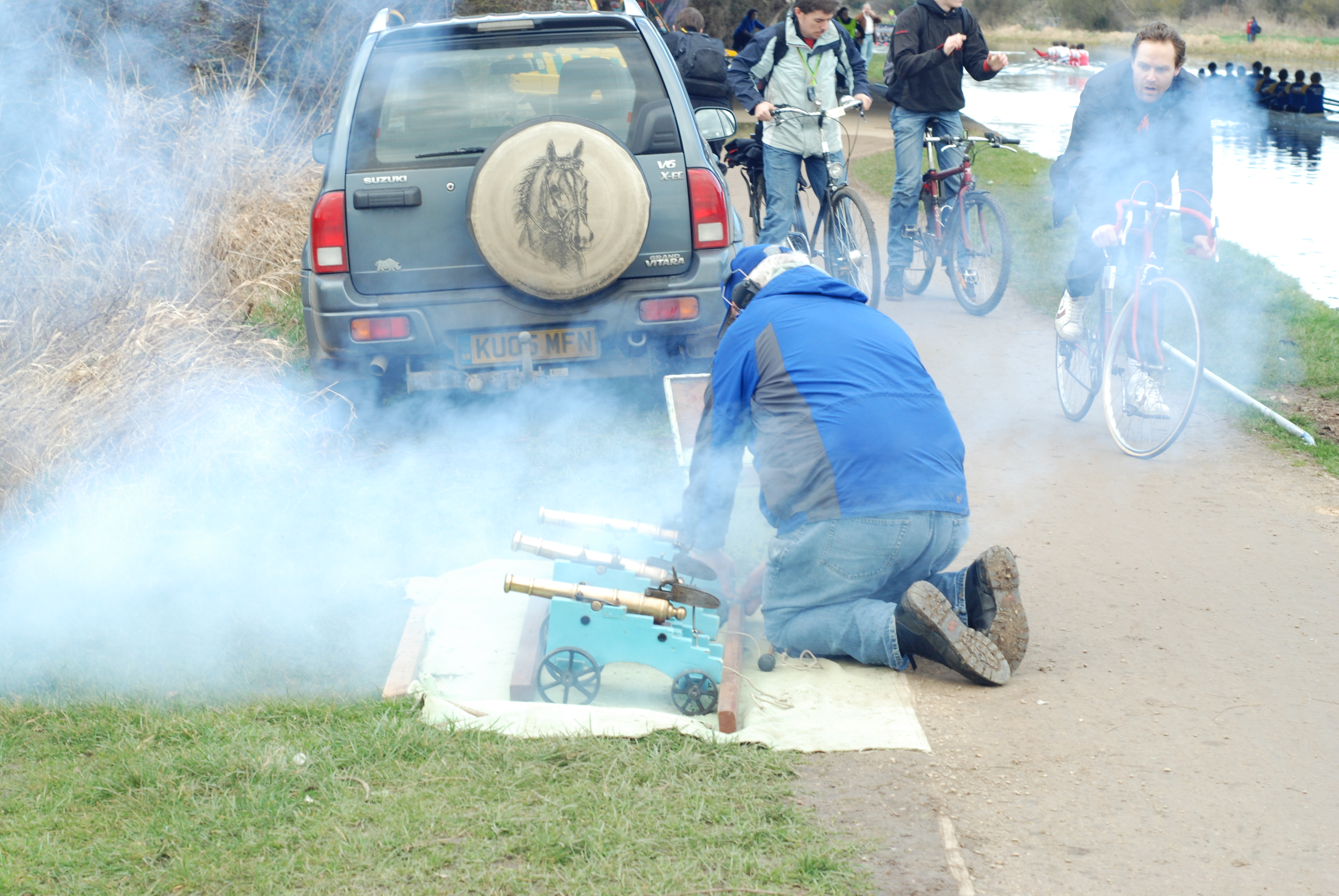
The starting gun. There are three gun signals: Five (or four in Cambridge) minute gun; 1 minute gun; and the starting gun.

Bumps races are typically raced in a series over several days. The starting order of each day's race is based on the previous day's results; the first day's starting order each year is determined by the results on the last day of the previous year. Each day the boats line up bow-to-stern, usually along the bank of the river, with a set distance between each boat and the next (usually about one and a half boat-lengths of clear water). The starting positions are usually marked by a rope or chain attached to the bank, the other end of which is held by each boat's cox.

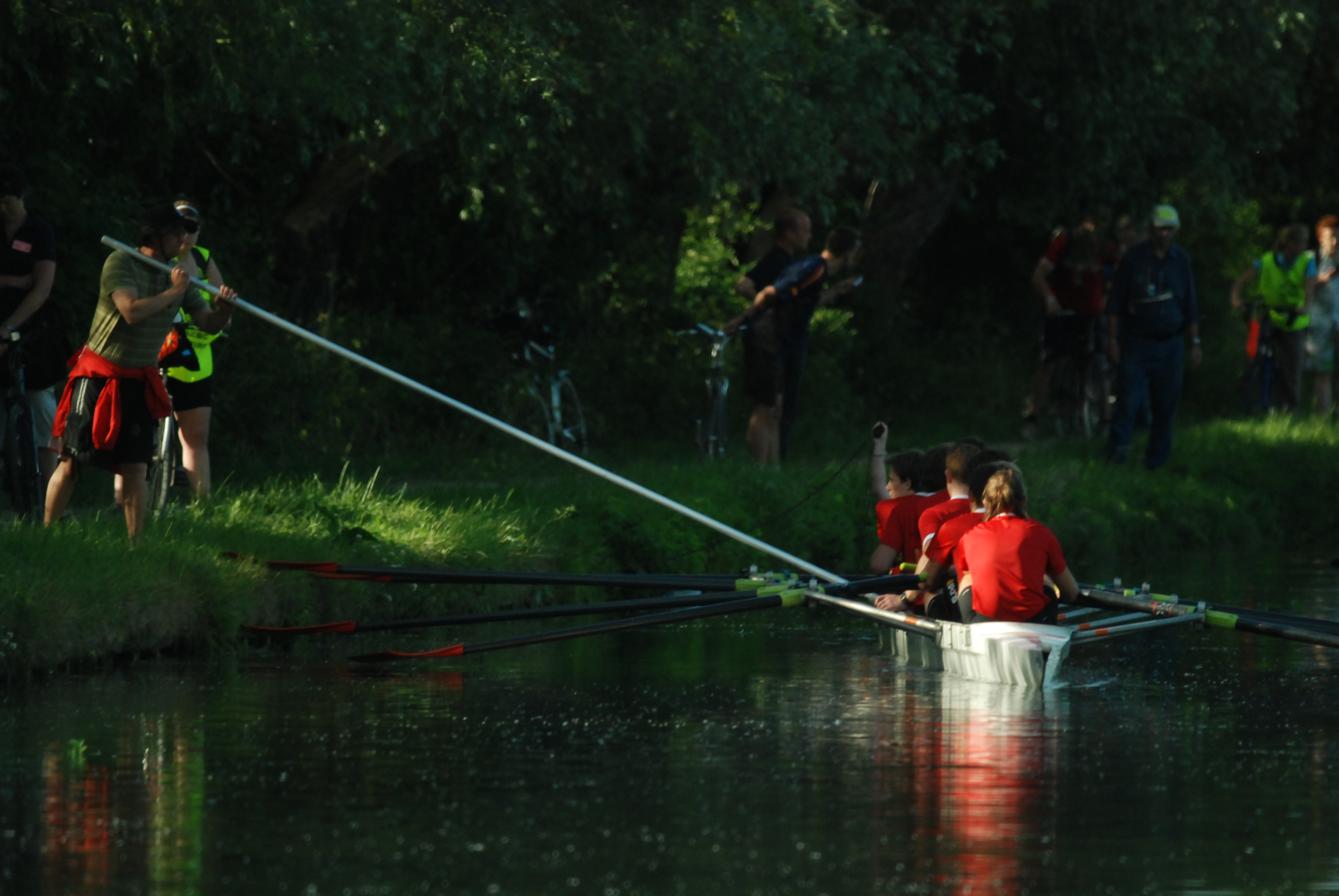
Poling off: LMBC in the 2009 May Bumps

Boats wait along the bank, and may be poled out just in time for the start, to avoid drifting. At the start signal the cox lets go of the rope and the crew starts to row, attempting to catch and bump the boat in front while simultaneously being chased by the one behind.

Corpus III bumps Girton III at the 2005 May Bumps in Cambridge

A bump is made when any form of contact is made with the boat in front; however, outright collisions are neither necessary nor encouraged. Alternatively, if possible, an overtaking-bump occurs when the stern of the chasing boat completely passes the bow of the boat in front. This is relatively rare simply because it is easier to make contact with a rival boat than it is to overtake it. A bump of this kind usually only occurs when a boat crashes. Under the current Cambridge rules, to overtake merely requires the pursuing boat to draw alongside the other boat's bow ball; side by side is good enough, and in the early part of the course a bump is deemed to occur when the bowball of the chasing crew passes the cox of the crew being chased.

Generally, and at Oxford during Eights Week, once a bump has occurred both crews pull over to the river bank and take no further part in that race. At Oxford during Torpids a bumping crew pulls over but the bumped crew must continue racing over the entire course and can be bumped by more than one crew per day. As bumps racing usually takes place on narrow stretches of water, when contact occurs, two or more boats can become tangled up or not clear the river quickly enough, causing the racing line to be blocked. This can be very dangerous and the chance of boats getting damaged is high. To avoid this, the cox of the boat being bumped can concede as soon as slight physical contact occurs or even once it is inevitable. Nonetheless, collisions involving several boats are common. Crews in Torpids tend to concede bumps early to avoid being entangled with the crew that caught them: should they be unable to continue, other boats may row past, overtake and 'bump' the stationary crew. Any crew that has been bumped starts the next race behind the boat or boats that caught it; they switch places. A boat which reaches the finish line without either bumping or being bumped is said to have 'rowed over' and stays in the same position.

== Organisation ==
As the length of the racing course is limited, large regattas are organised into divisions of 12 to 20 boats. Each division races separately, but they are ranked to achieve an overall order of crews: e.g. the top crew in the second division is considered to be one place behind the last crew in the first division. The first day's starting position is based on the final positions from the previous year, though in the bottom divisions the boats may be placed according to qualifying getting/rowing on races held before the event. This allows boat clubs to introduce new crews. On each day of a bumps regatta the division races are rowed in reverse order, i.e. the lowest division first. A crew finishing at the top of a division race goes on to compete in the next-higher division later that day (starting last). Alternatively, a crew finishing last in a division must race in the next-lower division the following day (starting first). This is referred to as a sandwich boat and allows crews to move between divisions.

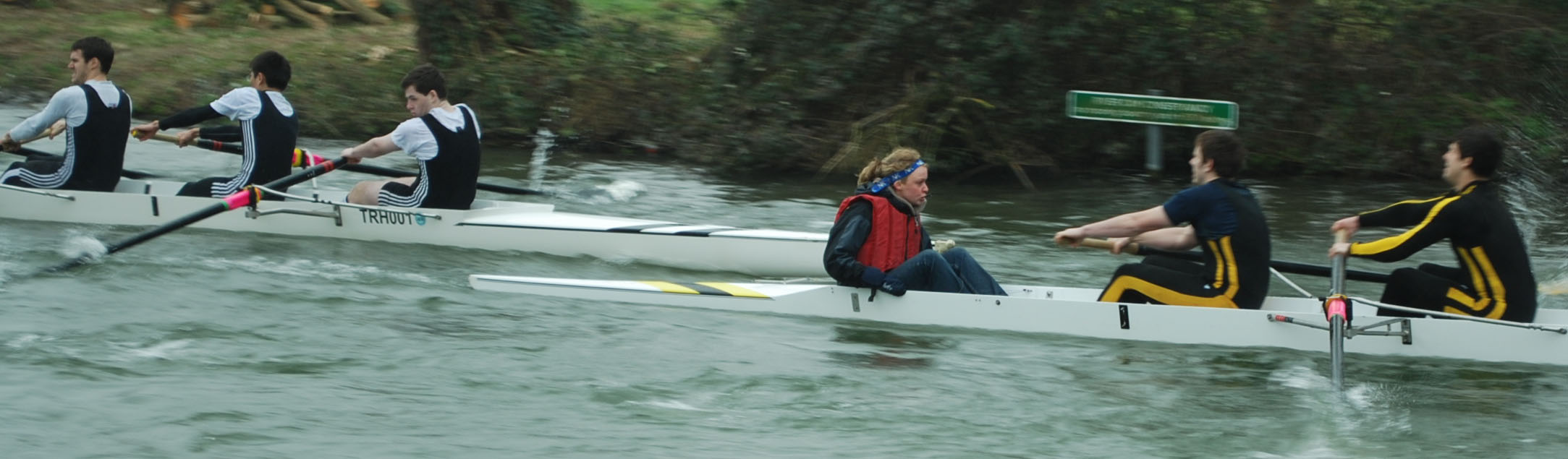
General view

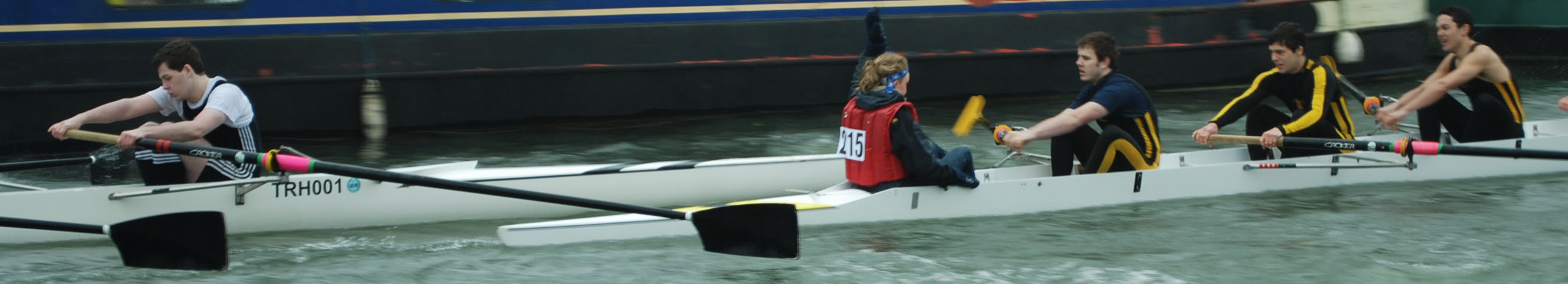
Overlap, no bump yet

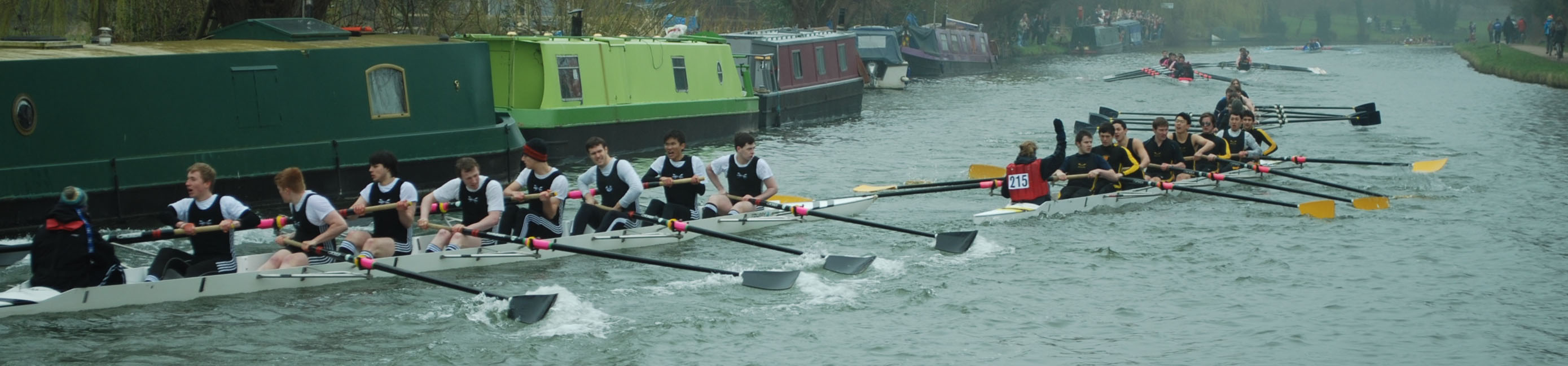
Cox raises hand, acknowledging the bump.

Trinity Hall II and Clare II, Lent bumps 2011

The crew of a boat (hereinafter "crew A") may find that the boat in front of them ("boat B") has caught the boat ("boat C") ahead of boat B. Since (except at Oxford during Torpids) these boats both then drop out, crew A must now try to catch the next boat ahead of them still racing (most often the one which started three places ahead). If crew A succeed, this is called an overbump and, in exchanging places with the boat that they bumped, they move three places up the start order. Further still, it is possible, though very rare, to double-overbump (move up five places) or triple-overbump (seven places). Only two occasions of a quadruple-overbump (nine places at once) have been recorded at the Cambridge May Bumps, by Peterhouse W1 in 1986 and by Magdalene M4 in 2018. A quintuple-overbump occurred in the 1984 Cambridge May Bumps in Men's Division 6 when Downing V caught Corpus IV after the 10 sandwich boats originally between them had all bumped out. Overbumps, and variants thereof, are most common in the lower divisions where the quality of the crews varies greatly year-on-year.

The ultimate achievement in such a competition is to finish first in the overall order; that crew is said to be 'Head of the River'. This is only realistically possible for crews starting a bump race in the top few places. A more attainable goal for most crews, apart from moving up towards the headship, is to bump up a place (or more) on each of the four days. The crew is said to have "won its blades", or achieved blades. Traditionally, members of such a crew can purchase a rowing oar in the crew colours and inscribed with the crews' names and the boats they bumped to hang on their wall. Conversely, crews that go down four places win a wooden spoon, achieving spoons. The bottom crew at the bottom of the last division is known as the 'Tail of the River'. A bumps chart is a graphical representation of the week's results; each boat's fortunes can be traced as its line on the chart rises and falls.

At Cambridge, the most successful college boat club over the four days of the May Bumps is awarded the Pegasus Cup, sponsored by Milton Brewery.

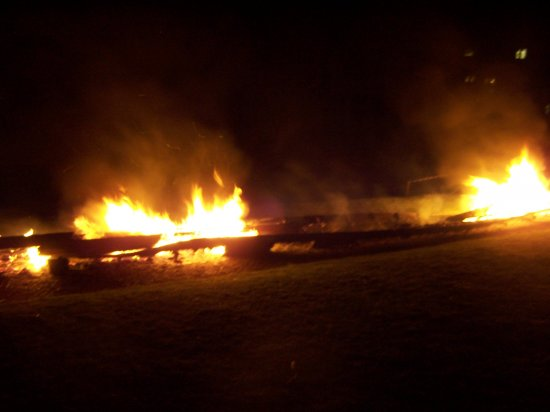
First and Third Trinity Boat Club celebrate the double headship of the Lent Bumps 2007 by burning a boat, the Fair Maid of Kent.

== Races ==
Both Oxford and Cambridge Universities host two sets of university bumps races per year, one in early spring and one in early summer, each lasting four days. At Cambridge these are called "Lent Bumps" and "May Bumps" respectively, while at Oxford they are "Torpids" and "Summer Eights". The races are for eights (i.e., eight rowers with a cox steering), each representing one of the university's various colleges. Most colleges enter several crews.

In both Oxford and Cambridge, there are also separate Town Bumps races in which local clubs compete. Oxford's races, run by the City of Oxford Rowing Club (CORC), are open to all comers and are raced in fours, all races taking place on the same day. Cambridge's races are run under the auspices of the Cambridgeshire Rowing Association (CRA) and are run exclusively in eights and take place over five consecutive days in July; though each division is only raced four times; one division is skipped, due to time constraints, on Monday to Thursday; on Friday all divisions race. There are typically four men's divisions with 17 boats (plus a sandwich boat; a sandwich boat being the top boat from each division) in each division, and three women's divisions. The bumps are fiercely contested, and the ideal that the races are for local rowers can lead to disputes over whether crews are 'legal'.

The United Hospitals boat club holds a bumps race over three days each May after exams on the River Thames, racing from upstream of Kew Bridge adjacent to the Royal Botanic Gardens, Kew ending at the UL Boathouse at Chiswick. Traditionally involving only medical school crews, in recent years alumni and non-medical crews have been allowed to enter as invitational crews. King’s College London Boat Club (KCLBC) are the current holders of headship.

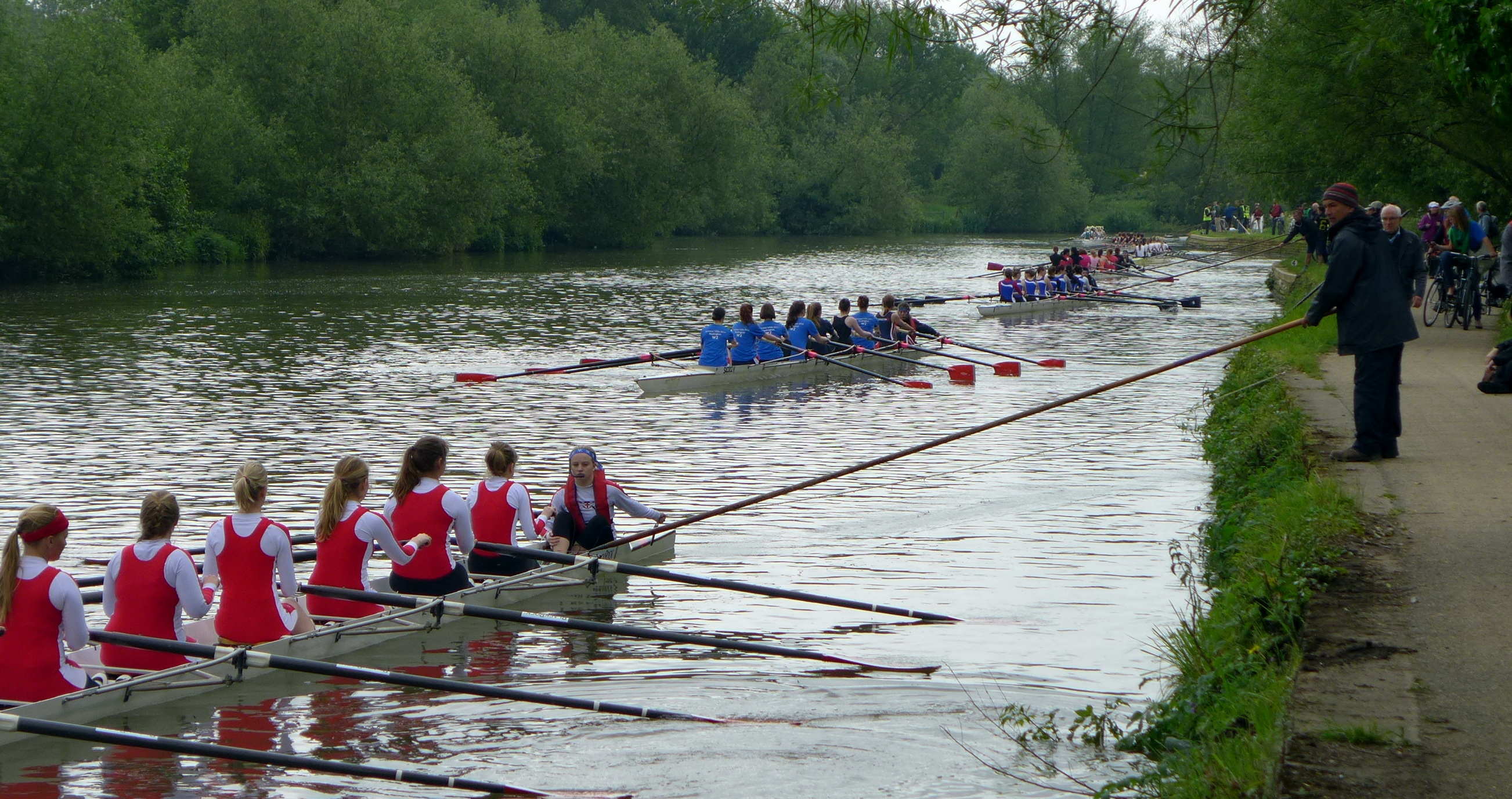
The start of a bumps race at Oxford, June 2014

At Eton and Shrewsbury, both schools still have an annual bumping race. At Eton, it takes place over four evenings, in early May. There is usually one boat entered per house (including one boat entered by College). Because of the dangerous nature of the sport, only fours are used, and only the second and third years may row. On the fourth evening there are prizes for the leaders of the chart and also a 'Bumping Cup' for the boat who has made the most bumps over the four nights. The event is marshalled by senior rowers and rowing prefects called The Monarch. The crew training is mainly pupil driven. Previously races were run every day until there were no more bumps (i.e., until they were nominally in speed order). This historical set-up could lead to weeks of racing and was therefore abandoned in favour of a four-day version more than 100 years ago.

== See also ==
- Cambridge Bumps:
  - Lent Bumps: 1998, 1999, 2000, 2001, 2002, 2003, 2004, 2005, 2006, 2007, 2008, 2009, 2010, 2011, 2012, 2013, 2014, 2015, 2016, 2017, 2018, 2019, 2020, 2022, 2023
  - May Bumps: 1998, 1999, 2000, 2001, 2002, 2003, 2004, 2005, 2006, 2007, 2008, 2009, 2010, 2011, 2012, 2013, 2014, 2015, 2016, 2017, 2018, 2019, 2020
- Oxford Bumps:
  - Torpids
  - Eights Week
