= The Boat Race 1992 =

138th Boat Race
- Date: 4 April 1992
- Winner: Oxford
- Margin of victory: 1 1/4 lengths
- Winning time: 17 minutes 44 seconds
- Overall record (Cambridge–Oxford): 69–68
- Umpire: Roger Stephens (Cambridge)

Other races
- Reserve winner: Goldie
- Women's winner: Cambridge

The 138th Boat Race took place on 4 April 1992. Held annually, the Boat Race is a side-by-side rowing race between crews from the Universities of Oxford and Cambridge along the River Thames. Cambridge cox Andrew Probert was the oldest competitor in Boat Race history at the age of 38 years and 86 days. Oxford won by 1 1/4 lengths, the closest margin of victory for twenty years. The race also featured the first German competitor in the history of the event in Dirk Bangert. Umpired by former Cambridge rower Roger Stephens, Mike Rosewell writing in The Times described the race as "one of the greatest races since 1829".

In the reserve race, Cambridge's Goldie defeated Oxford's Isis, while Cambridge won the Women's Boat Race.

== Background ==
The Boat Race is a side-by-side rowing competition between the University of Oxford (sometimes referred to as the "Dark Blues") and the University of Cambridge (sometimes referred to as the "Light Blues"). First held in 1829, the race takes place on the 4.2-mile (6.8 km) Championship Course on the River Thames in southwest London. The rivalry is a "hotly contested point of honour" between the two universities, followed throughout the United Kingdom, and broadcast on several international television networks. Oxford went into the race as reigning champions, having won the 1991 race by 4 1/4 lengths, with Cambridge leading overall with 69 victories to Oxford's 67 (excluding the "dead heat" of 1877).

The first Women's Boat Race took place in 1927, but did not become an annual fixture until the 1960s. Up until 2014, the contest was conducted as part of the Henley Boat Races, but as of the 2015 race, it is held on the River Thames, on the same day as the men's main and reserve races. The reserve race, contested between Oxford's Isis boat and Cambridge's Goldie boat has been held since 1965. It usually takes place on the Tideway, prior to the main Boat Race.

President of the Cambridge University Boat Club, Max Justicz, said of the previous year's race: "We were burned on that day. Badly burned. It was worse than other defeats because we thought we could win ... Oxford just rowed through us; with every stroke they took they destroyed our belief in ourselves." His crew mate, Nick Clarry, focused on the approach to this year's race: "This year it's heads down and get on with the job. We know that if we don't cross the line first on the day, nobody could care less who we are."

Beefeater Gin sponsored the event; prior to this year's race they had announced a £1 million deal to continue their close involvement for a further three years.

== Crews ==
Aged 38 years and 3 months, Cambridge's cox, Andrew Probert, was the oldest competitor in the history of the Boat Race, a record unsurpassed until James Cracknell rowed in the 2019 race at the age of 46. Oxford's crew featured four returning Blues and two former Isis crew members, while Cambridge saw three old Blues participate. The Oxford boat was made up from five Britons, an Australian, an American and a Yugoslav; Cambridge was represented by seven Britons, an American and Dirk Bangert, the first German to participate in the event. Oxford's crew were coached by Steve Royle and Patrick Sweeney, and assisted by the former East Germany Olympic coach Jürgen Gröbler, while Cambridge were guided by Oxford's successful coach of 1991, John Wilson. Watermen Bert Green and Jim Cobb provided advice to the Oxford and Cambridge coxes respectively.

Seat	Oxford			Cambridge		
Seat	Name	College	Weight	Name	College	Weight
Bow	Kingsley Poole	St John's	13 st 4 lb	Max Justicz (P)	Sidney Sussex	13 st 6.5 lb
2	Joseph Michels (P)	University	13 st 2.5 lb	Nicholas Clarry	Jesus	13 st 1 lb
3	Boris Mavra	Jesus	14 st 8 lb	James Behrens	Downing	13 st 2.5 lb
4	Hamish Hume	Pembroke	13 st 2.5 lb	Daniel Justicz	Downing	13 st 3 lb
5	Peter Bridge	Oriel	13 st 13.5 lb	Donald Fawcett	Magdalene	15 st 4 lb
6	Calman Maclennan	Keble	14 st 6.5 lb	David Gillard	St Catharine's	14 st 7.5 lb
7	Simon Davy	Worcester	12 st 6 lb	Stephen Fowler	Robinson	13 st 4 lb
Stroke	Ian Gardiner	St Peter's	13 st 1 lb	Dirk Bangert	Fitzwilliam	12 st 10.5 lb
Cox	Elizabeth Chick	Christ Church	7 st 11.5 lb	Andrew Probert	Magdalene	7 st 11 lb
Source: (P) – boat club president

== Race ==
The Championship Course along which the Boat Race is contested

The race commenced at 2.35 p.m. Oxford won the toss and elected to start from the Middlesex station. The boats raced side-by-side for the first three-and-a-half miles of the race, for fourteen minutes neither crew held a lead of more than half-a-length over the other, and umpire Roger Stephens was forced to issue warnings to both coxes for steering too close to one another. The Dark Blues held a slight early advantage but Cambridge pulled ahead at Hammersmith Bridge. Oxford edged ahead at Barnes Bridge, and passed the finishing post in a time of 17 minutes 44 seconds, 1 1/4 lengths ahead of Cambridge, the closest finish in the last 20 years. Oxford's Yugoslav rower Boris Mavra had to be lifted from the boat at the end of the race. The Beefeater Gin Trophy was presented to the winning boat club president by Raymond Seitz.

In the reserve race, Cambridge's Goldie won by 3 1/4 lengths over Isis, their fifth victory in six years. Cambridge won the 47th Women's Boat Race by one-third-of-a-length in a time of 6 minutes and 20 seconds, their third victory in four years.

== Reaction ==
Mike Rosewell, writing in The Times complimented all of the race participants: "the 18 individuals involved produced one of the greatest races since 1829." Former Oxford coach Daniel Topolski, writing for The Observer, described the Oxford's win as "scintillating" and noted that the crews were "locked in combat for fully three and a half miles." Christopher Dodd, writing in The Guardian suggested that "the promise was delivered; a rare race".

Oxford's number five and Great Britain international Peter Bridge noted Gröbler's impact: "We really felt the strength that we had built up over six months under Jürgen's methods." He continued: "[Cambridge] were slower off the start than we expected which was nice." Referring to Cambridge's lead at Hammersmith Bridge, their number seven Steve Fowler said "we were feeling good but we should have closed the door there and then. We should have killed them on the bend." Cambridge cox Probert conceded to his counterpart Liz Chick: "she steered very well." Oxford coach Gröbler stated: "It was wonderful. Both crews ... were very good — and so disciplined. I like these university students." Cambridge coach Wilson lamented: "we failed to capitalise at Hammersmith and they grew in confidence thereafter."
