= Christ's College Boat Club =

British rowing club

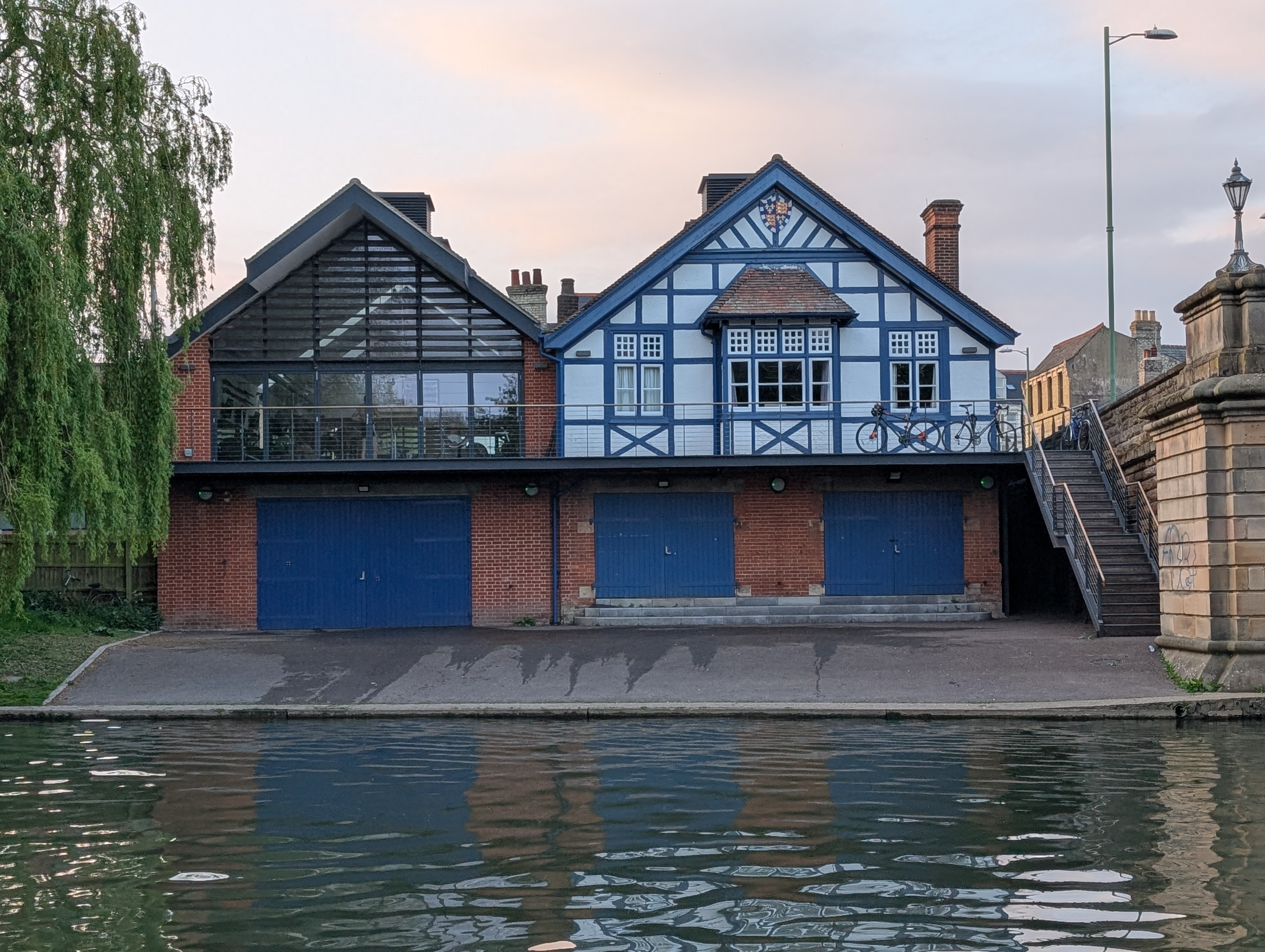

- Location: Cambridge, England
- Coordinates: 52°12′48.9″N 0°7′31.87″E
- Home water: River Cam
- Founded: 1830
- Membership: Christ's College, Cambridge
- Affiliations: British Rowing CUCBC
- Website: christscollegeboatclub.co.uk

Christ's College Boat Club is the rowing club for members of Christ's College, Cambridge. It inhabits the oldest wooden framed boathouse on the river, the nearest to Jesus Lock.

Christ's has taken women's headship once during the 2015 Lent Bumps and the men's headship once during the 1833 Bumps.

== History ==
The men's 1st VIII, having started the Lent Bumps near the bottom of the table, quickly moved up. They had reached the 1st division by 1897, where they remained until 1972. Since the 1980s, the 1st VIII has remained largely in the middle or lower half of the 1st division. In the May Bumps, Christ's started in the 1st division, but dropped away into the 2nd by the mid-1890s. It had recovered a few years later, and largely remained in the 1st division until 1974. Since then, the 1st VIII has spent most of its time in the lower half of the 1st division, occasionally rising into the top-10.

Christ's men are yet to take a headship in the Lent or May Bumps (but were head of the river for the previous combined bumps events in 1833), although the 1st VIII have been as high as 4th in the May Bumps and 2nd in the Lent Bumps. On the final day of the 1996 Lent Bumps, Christ's, starting from 2nd position, managed to get overlap (i.e. their bows beyond the stern of the crew they were chasing) on the head crew, Downing, but failed to make contact, and were eventually bumped themselves by Caius at the Railway Bridge.

In 1926 the club won the Colquhoun Sculls, following the success of T. E. Letchworth.

The women's boat first raced in 1980, and has largely remained in the top-half of the 2nd division or bottom-half of the 1st division, but has risen to Head of the River in the Lent Bumps and as high as 3rd in the May Bumps. Christ's 1st women became Head of the River on the 3rd day of Lent bumps in 2015 and rowed over on the last day. To celebrate, a boat (acquired from Lady Margaret Boat Club) was burnt in Third Court of the college grounds. One end of the burnt boat is now displayed in the Buttery (the college bar). Between 2007 and 2010, the Christ's 1st women bumped 26 times in 32 races without themselves being bumped, including bumping on 17 consecutive days of racing.

== Honours ==
=== Henley Royal Regatta ===
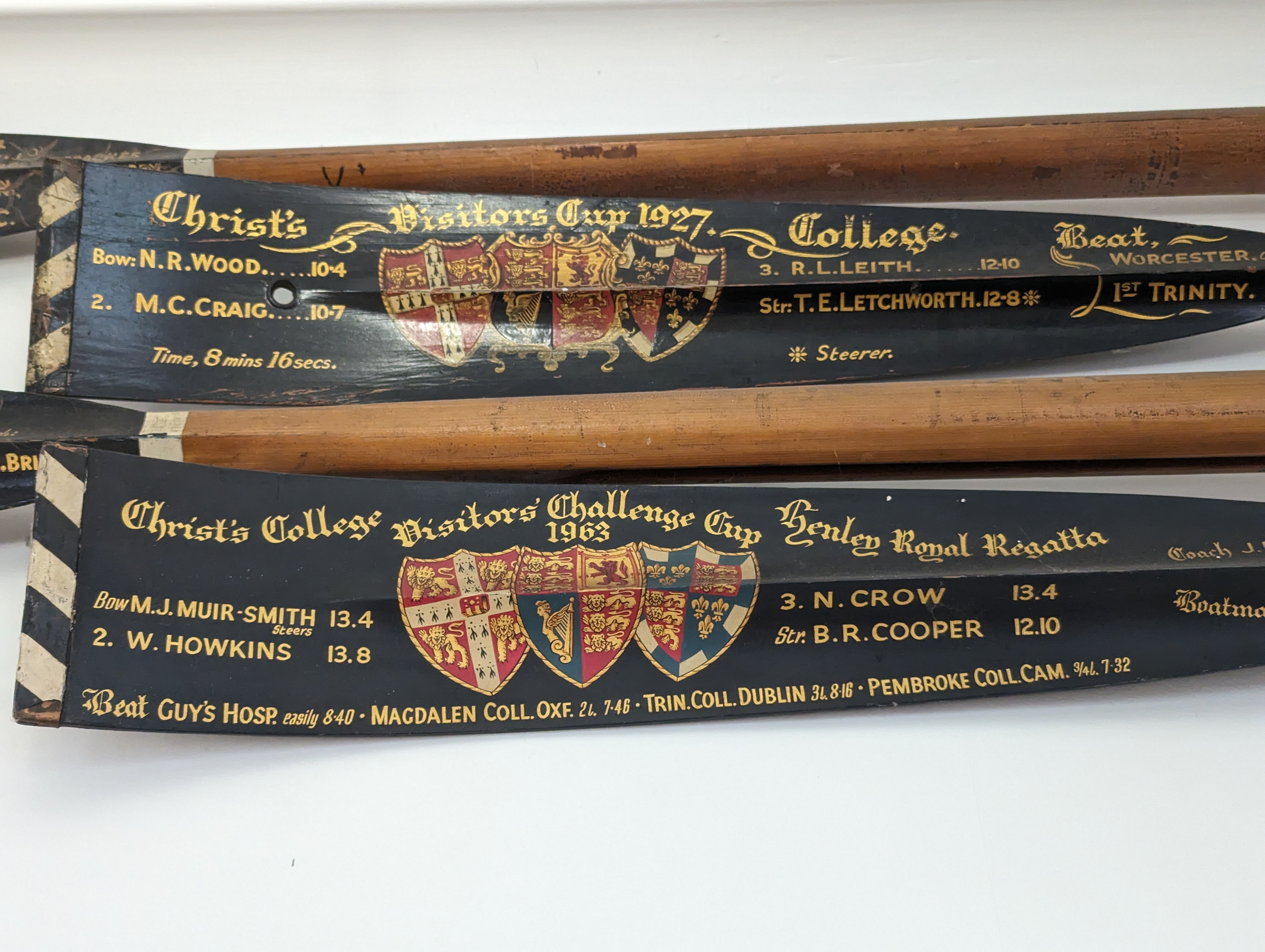
Christ's College Boat Club blades from 1963 and 1927

Year	Races won
1853	Silver Goblets
1906	Thames Challenge Cup
1907	Thames Challenge Cup
1927	Visitors' Challenge Cup
1933	Visitors' Challenge Cup
1963	Visitors' Challenge Cup

=== Boat Race representatives ===
The following rowers were part of the rowing club at the time of their participation in The Boat Race.

Men's boat race

Year	Name
1842	J. Royds
1845	W. S. Lockhart
1868	W. H. Lowe
1869	F. J. Young
1870	W. H. Lowe
1871	W. H. Lowe
1872	M. Robinson
1881	C. W. Moore
1882	C. W. Moore
1883	C. W. Moore
1884	C. W. Moore
1920	A. F. W Dixon
1920	E. T. Johnstone

Year	Name
1946	M. S. Allman-Ward
1947	W. A. D. Windham
1948	E. A. P. Bircher
1949	E. A. P. Bircher
1949	T. R. Ashton (cox)
1950	E. A. P. Bircher
1951	W. A. D. Windham
1957	J. A. Pitchford
1958	J. A. Pitchford
1964	M. Muir-Smith
1984	P. M. Hobson (cox)
1999	Kieran West
2001	Kieran West

Women's boat race

Year	Name
2018	Tricia Smith
2019	Tricia Smith
2019	Pippa Whittaker
2025	Katy Hempson

== See also ==
- Cambridge University Combined Boat Club
- Christ's College, Cambridge
