= St Catharine's College Boat Club (Cambridge) =

British rowing club

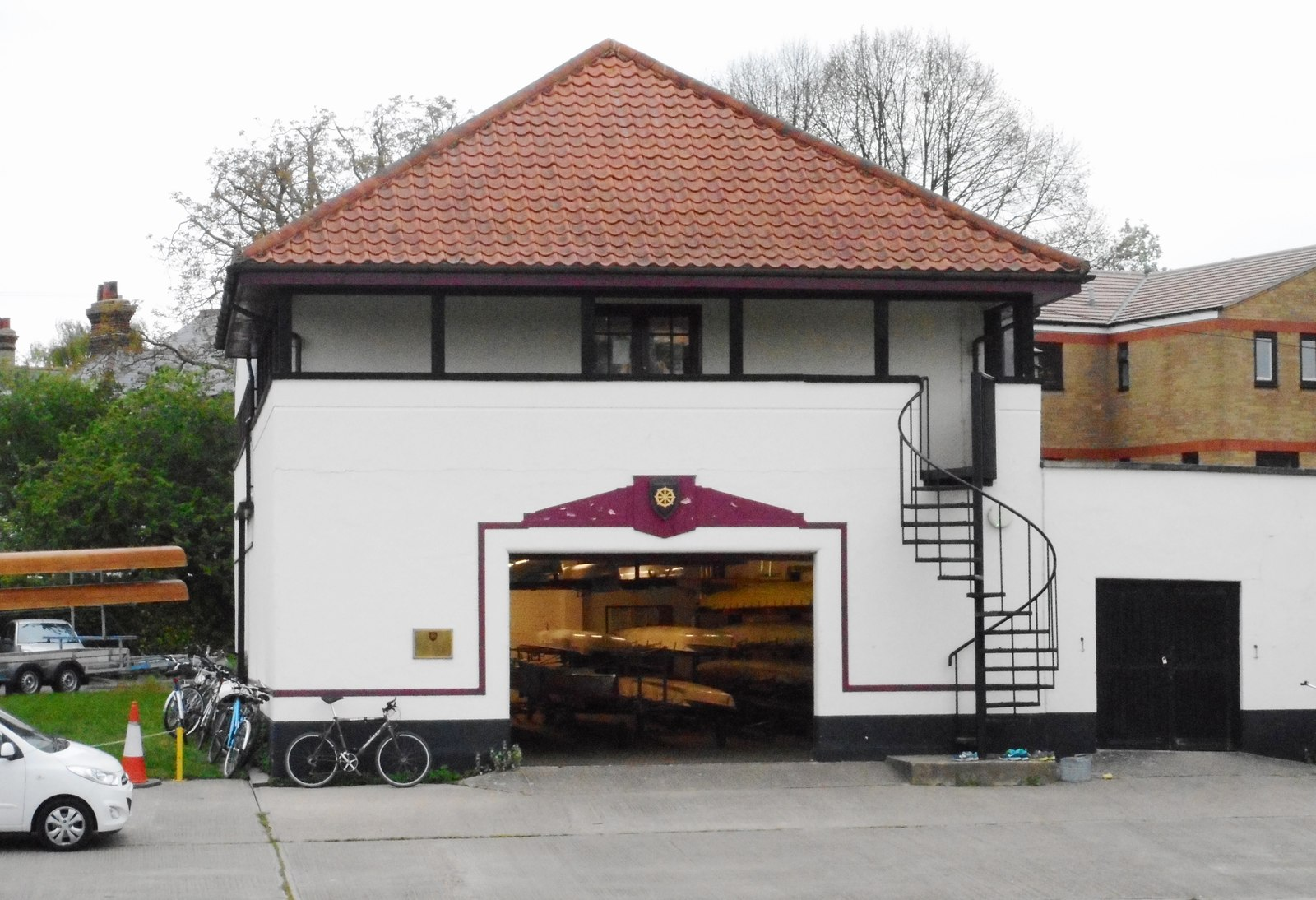

- Location: Cambridge, England
- Coordinates: 52°12′40.78″N 0°7′49.86″E
- Home water: River Cam
- Founded: 1833
- Affiliations: British Rowing CUCBC
- Website: catzboatclub.co.uk

Events
- Cardinals Regatta

St Catharine's College Boat Club (SCCBC or Catz) is the rowing club for members of St Catharine's College, Cambridge, England. The club has provided multiple rowers for The Boat Race.

== History ==
In the Lent Bumps, the men's first VIII resided largely near the boundary of the 1st and 2nd divisions, but spent a few years in the top-10, reaching as high as 6th in the 1930s and in 1968, and more recently, peaking at 9th in 2002. They now reside in the 1st division. In the May Bumps, St Catharine's spent most of the time before the 1940s in the 2nd division, but rose to 4th in 1947 and 1961, with the 2nd VIII reaching the 1st division in 1963. In 1967, the 2nd VIII actually managed to bump the 1st VIII on the second day, but the 1st VIII bumped back the following day. Since then, the 1st VIII have spent most of the time in the middle to lower half of the 1st division. Between 1998 and 2004, the men's 1st VIII were bumped only once and rose to 2nd position, partially helped by having many oarsmen trialling for university crews, but St Catharine's have never yet taken a headship. They are now sitting 5th on the river (2013).

The first women's VIII first raced in 1980, and in the Lent Bumps have spent most of the time since 1990 in the 1st division, ranking as high as 6th in 1997, but had fallen into the 2nd in 2003 and 2006. Since then have returned to the center of the first division. In the May Bumps, St Catharine's 1st women's IV rose quickly to 3rd in 1989. When the races were reorganised following the change to eight-oared boats, the 1st women's VIII were placed in 8th. In 2002, they managed to get to 7th, the highest they've yet managed in eight-oared boats in the May Bumps, but the following three years saw St Catharine's fall to the top of the 2nd division. 2006–07 saw a turn-around, and they have since climbed back towards the middle of the top division.

== Boathouse ==
The current boat house was purchased from the First and Third Trinity Boat Club in 1958 under the leadership of David Bailey, the captain in 1957. He was approached after the 1957 May Bumps by the captain of First and Third (A A M Mays-Smith), who felt that St Catharine's showed the most spirit and drive of those boat clubs without their own boathouse. The boat house was formerly host to the 3rd Trinity boat club, a club of old Etonians and Westminsters, and was built in the early 1930s. The boathouse is located between the Goldie Boathouse and the 1st & 3rd Trinity Boat House.

In 2012, work began to renovate the boathouse, and the newly refurbished and extended boathouse was officially opened by the Master, Dame Jean Thomas, along with a long-time sponsor of the boat club, Herb Bate, on 16 March 2013. The extension now hosts separate male and female changing rooms with lockers and proper showers, as well as a kitchen and office; and the old upstairs has become an erg room with enough ergs for an VIII to train together.

== Honours ==
=== Boat Race representatives ===
The following rowers were part of the rowing club at the time of their participation in The Boat Race.

Men's boat race

Year	Name
1910	R. Davies
1933	W. L. R. Carbonell
1961	R. G. Nicholson
1961	J. E. Gobbett
1961	D. W. G. Calder
1962	R. G. Nicholson
1965	D. J. Roberts
1965	D. P. Moore
1967	G. C. M. Leggett
1968	G. C. M. Leggett
1969	D. L. Cruttenden
1970	D. L. Cruttenden
1972	R. J. S. Clarke
1973	R. P. B. Duncan
1974	R. P. B. Duncan
1975	A. F. U. Powell
1976	D. J. Searle
1977	D. J. Searle
1977	S. J. Clegg
1978	S. J. Clegg
1978	R. N. E. Davies
1979	S. J. Clegg
1979	R. N. E. Davies

Year	Name
1984	J. D. Kinsella
1985	J. S. Witter
1990	Richard J. Stalte
1991	Richard J. Stalte
1991	David R. Gillard
1992	David R. Gillard
1993	David R. Gillard
2002	James Livingston
2003	Hugo Mallinson
2003	James Livingston
2003	James Omartian (cox)
2004	Christopher Le Neve Foster
2004	Hugo Mallinson
2004	Steffen Buschbacher
2005	Steffen Buschbacher
2010	Derek Rasmussen
2011	Dan Rix-Standing
2011	George Nash
2013	George Nash
2022	Jamie Hunter
2023	Matthew Edge
2024	Matthew Edge

Women's boat race

Year	Name
2018	Sophie Shapter (cox)
2024	Clare Hole
