= Downing College Boat Club =

British rowing club

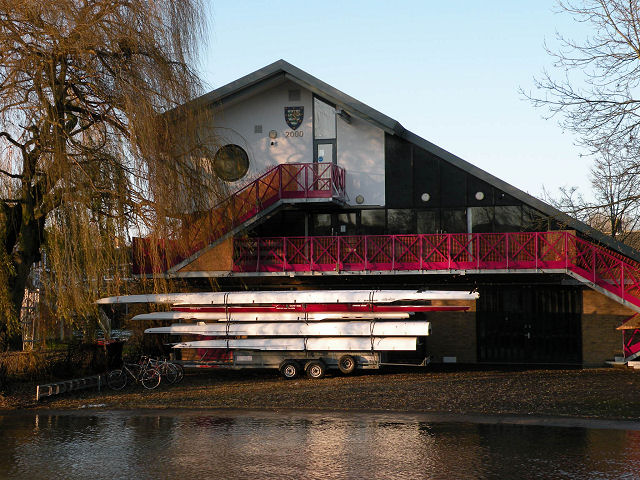

- Location: Cambridge, England
- Coordinates: 52°12′38.61″N 0°8′6.51″E
- Home water: River Cam
- Founded: 1863
- Membership: Downing College, Cambridge
- Affiliations: British Rowing CUCBC
- Website: downingboatclub.co.uk

Notable members
- Annabel Vernon

Downing College Boat Club (or DCBC) is the rowing club for members of Downing College, Cambridge.

== History ==
Despite the college admitting undergraduates in 1821, Downing's boat club did not form until 1863, with their first race being in the spring of 1864. The men's 1st VIII did not feature regularly in the 1st division of the Lent and May Bumps until the 1960s. The club first became Head of the Mays in 1982, a position it lost in 1983 but then regained in 1984. The head crew was coached by Downing alumnus Graeme Hall, who was the stroke of the Cambridge crew which won The Boat Race 1968 and again in 1969, and coached the British Men's VIII to win the silver medal in Rowing at the 1980 Summer Olympics.

In 2018, the first indoor rowing training tank in the East of England was built in the club's boathouse.

== Honours ==
=== Boat Race representatives ===
The following rowers were part of the rowing club at the time of their participation in The Boat Race.

Men's boat race

Year	Name
1868	W. F. MacMichael
1869	W. F. MacMichael
1963	M. V. Bevan
1964	M. V. Bevan
1968	C. S. Powell
1968	G. F. Hall
1969	C. S. Powell
1969	G. F. Hall
1977	C. M. Horton
1978	C. M. Horton
1978	G. Henderson (cox)
1979	P. W. Cross
1979	G. Henderson (cox)
1980	A. D. Dalrymple
1981	M. J. S. Clark
1981	A. D. Dalrymple
1982	B. M. Philp
1983	B. M. Philp

Year	Name
1985	J. D. Hughes
1985	Stephen M. Peel
1986	J. D. Hughes
1986	Stephen M. Peel
1987	Richard A. B. Spink
1987	Stephen M. Peel
1988	Richard A. B. Spink
1990	Richard C. Young
1992	James H. Behrens
1992	Daniel Justicz
1993	James H. Behrens
1996	Rob M. Waller
1997	Roger Pim
2019	Callum Sullivan
2025	Ollie Boyne

Women's boat race

Year	Name
2015	Holly Hill
2016	Théa Zabell
2016	Zara Goozée
2017	Holly Hill
2018	Théa Zabell

The club has had several rowers achieving Half-Blue colours for the Lightweight Boat Races, including James Nash (Spare Pair 2026), Edward Townsend (Lightweight 2022), Gianluca Maffi (Spare Pair 2022, 2023, Lightweight Boat and President 2025), and Livia Lisi-Vega (Lightweight 2023).

== Gallery ==
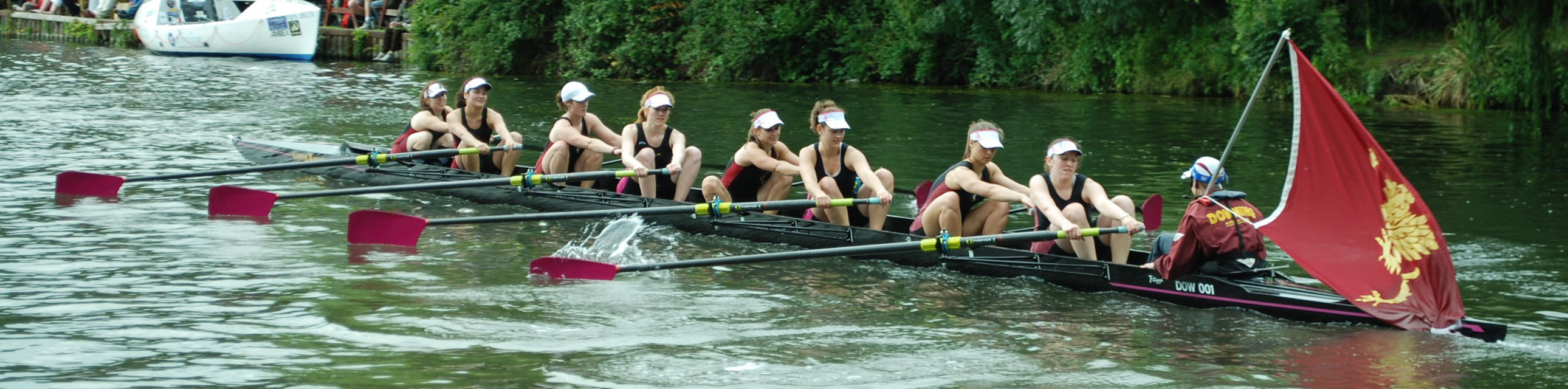
Downing W1 exhibition row after rowing over as head of Mays, 2011

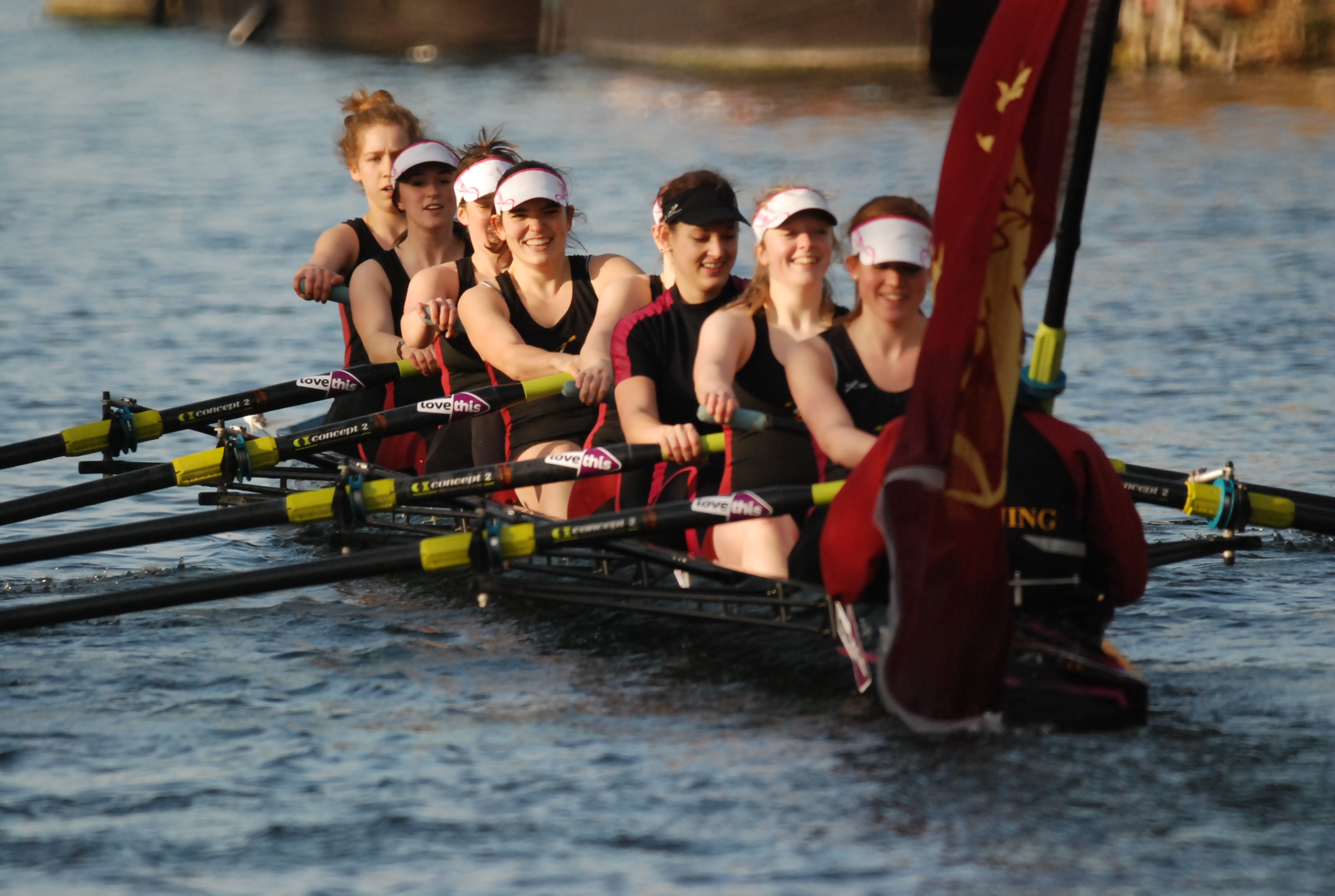
Downing W1 exhibition row 2012

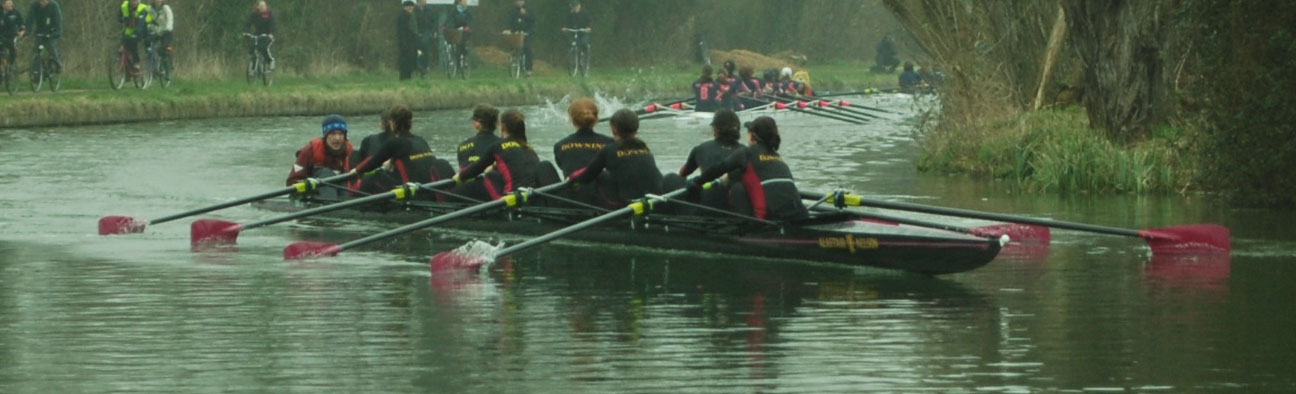
Downing W1 at Lent Bumps 2011
