= Caius Boat Club =

Boat club at Gonville and Caius College, Cambridge

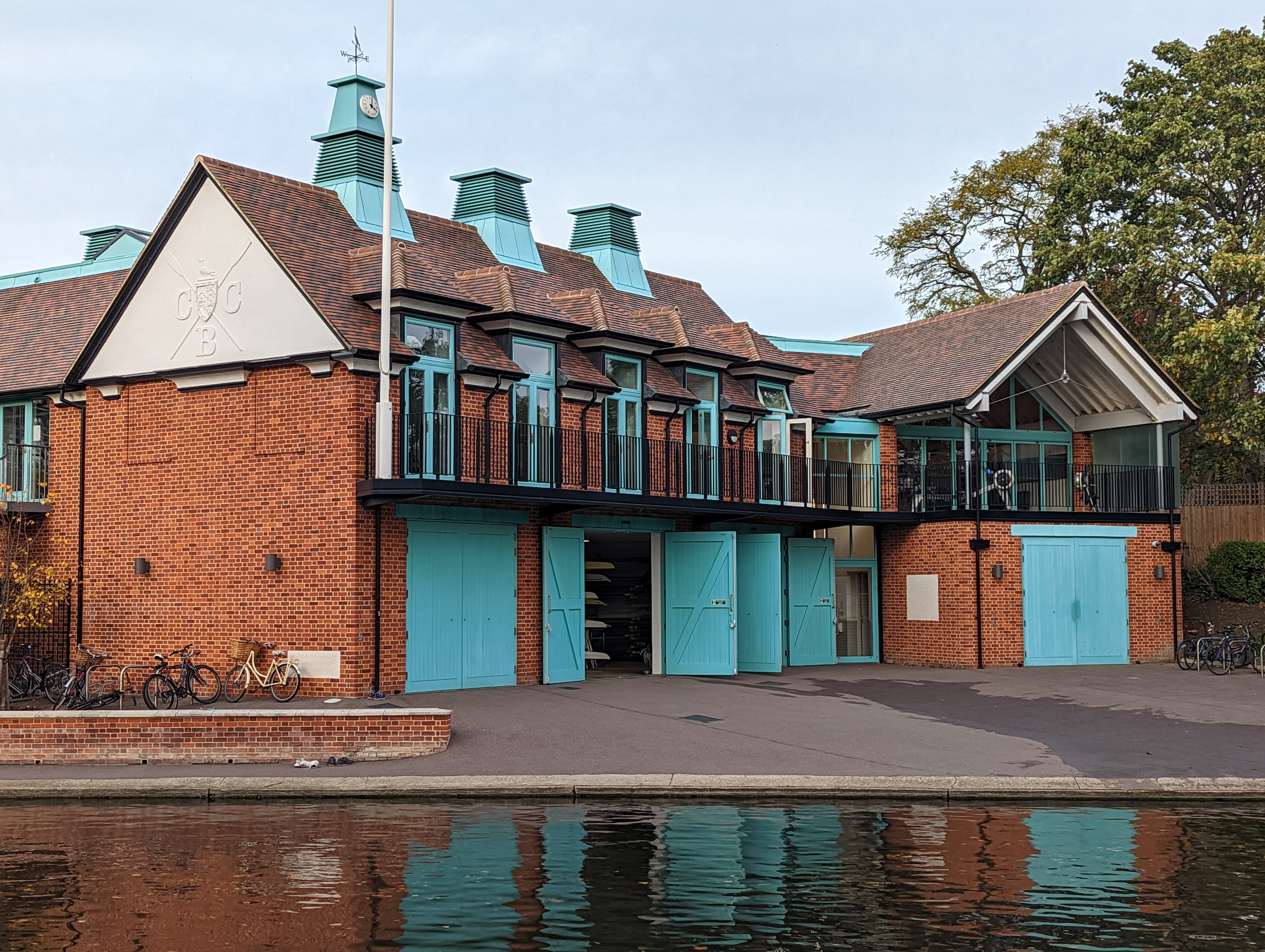

- Location: Cambridge, England
- Coordinates: 52°12′46.7″N 0°7′39.5″E
- Home water: River Cam
- Founded: 1827
- Key people: George Budden (President); Dr Maša Amatt (Senior Treasurer); J. J. Fardon (Captain)
- Membership: Gonville and Caius College, Cambridge
- Affiliations: British Rowing CUCBC
- Website: caiusboatclub.org

Caius Boat Club (CBC; Caius /kiːz/ KEEZ) is the boat club for members of Gonville and Caius College, Cambridge. The club has rowed on the River Cam since its foundation in 1827 as the "Caius Wherry Club" and, like the other college boat clubs, competes to gain and hold the headships of the Lent Bumps and May Bumps, contested separately by men's and women's eights. As of 2026, the club's men hold the headship of the Lent Bumps.

Since 1999, Caius has won more headships than any other Cambridge college in both men's bumps competitions. The men have taken 16 May Bumps headships in that period, including an unbroken reign from 2002 to 2007, one of the longest in the event's history, and 13 Lent Bumps headships, the most recent in 2026. In 2000, Caius became the first college to hold both the men's and women's May headships in the same year, part of a run in which the women held the May headship for three consecutive years (2000–2002), later adding a fourth in 2024. The club has won 21 men's May headships in total since 1827, the fourth-most of any college.

== History ==
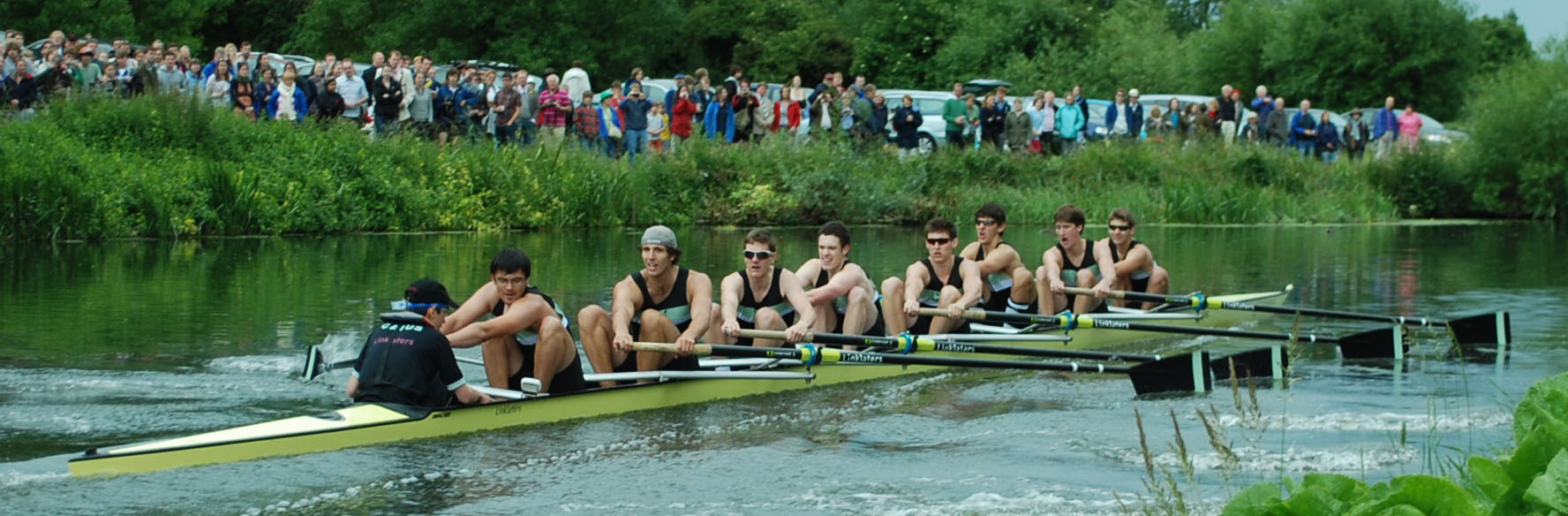
Caius rowing over as head on Saturday of Mays, 2011

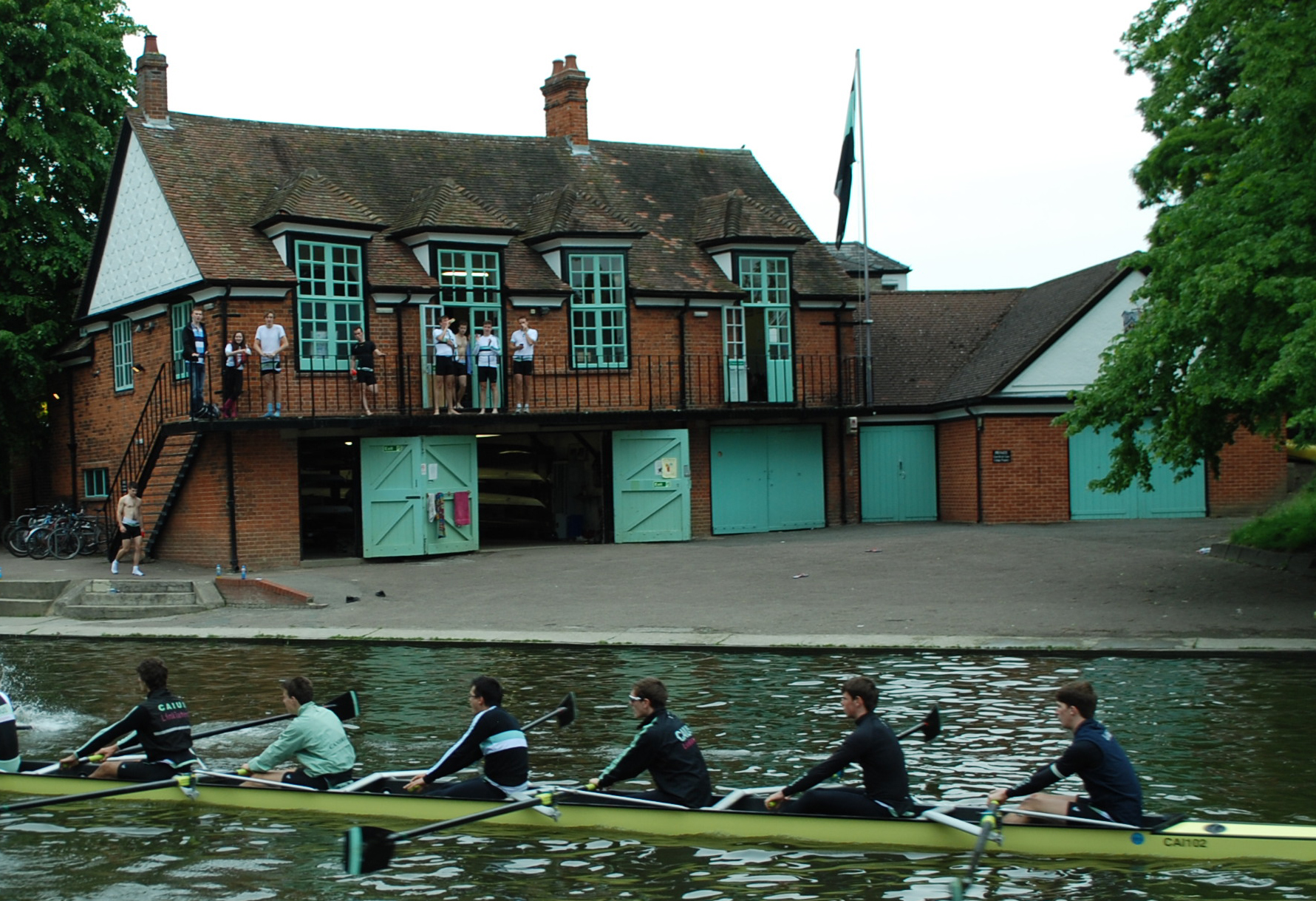
Caius M1 outside their boathouse during Mays 2012

=== Early history ===
From its inception in 1827 as the "Caius Wherry Club" the club has been active on the river, becoming properly established with the construction of its own boathouse. Success came quickly: Caius oarsmen appeared in the Boat Race as early as 1836, among them Thomas Selby Egan, who coxed Cambridge in four races between 1836 and 1840, and the club took the headship of the river in 1840, 1841 and twice in 1844 (when one single continuous bumps race existed, raced twice per year). The club also found early success away from the Cam, winning the Silver Wherries (precursor to the Silver Goblets) at Henley Royal Regatta in 1845, followed in later generations by the Visitors' Challenge Cup in 1896 and the Thames Challenge Cup in 1904 and 1914. The club did not hold another headship until 1987.

=== Notable achievements ===
During the May Bumps of 1998, the top 3 men's and women's crews all won Blades by bumping up on each of the 4 days of racing, with the Men's 1st VIII finishing Head of the River. No previous year had seen all of the top six boats win Blades.

The following year, Caius took the headship of both the Lent Bumps and May Bumps — the first "double headship" in the club's history. In 2000, Caius became the first college to hold both the men's and women's May headships in the same year. They repeated the feat in 2002: these are the only 2 years of "double Mays headship" in Cambridge rowing history. Caius completed the double men's headship 11 times between 1999 and 2019, including five consecutive years from 2002 to 2006.

Between the Lent Bumps 2002 and May Bumps 2006, Caius men became only the second club to take 10 consecutive headships. According to the popular myth on the River Cam, this earned CBC the right to erect a clock tower on their boathouse, made reality when the new boathouse was finished in 2017.

The Men's crew of 2010/2011 remained unbeaten on the river Cam in eights for an entire year. This run saw them bump up 4 times to the headship of the Lent Bumps (the first time this had been achieved in either bumps since 1962, and in the Lents since before WW2) and up 2 times to the headship of the May Bumps. They also represented the Cambridge Colleges at the Henley Boat Races, defeating Christ Church, Oxford in a Collegiate Varsity Race.

Caius Boat Club has developed athletes who have gone on to trial for the university boat club CUBC (and formerly CULRC and CUWBC). In 2014 there were Caians in both the men and women's Blue Boat, Goldie, the CUWBC Lightweight boat and the men's lightweight spare pair. In the Cambridge clean sweep of The Boat Race 2023, two members of the Goldie crew, one from Blondie, one from the men's spare pair, one from the women's spare pair, and one further openweight men's spare all learnt to row at CBC.

During the May Bumps 2023, Caius came close to repeating the unique May Bumps Double: the men started Head, with the women bumping up to Head on the first night; the Women rowed over for 2 nights but lost the headship on the final day.

== Current bumps positions ==
As of the 2026 May Bumps, Caius Boat Club's crews hold the following positions in the Cambridge Bumping Races, shown as overall finishing position followed by position within division. O1–O3 denote the men's 1st–3rd VIIIs and W1–W3 the women's 1st–3rd VIIIs.

Current bumps positions of Caius crews
Crew	Lent Bumps	May Bumps
O1	Head of the River (1st, Div 1)	2nd (2nd, Div 1)
W1	8th (8th, Div 1)	3rd (3rd, Div 1)
O2	20th (3rd, Div 2; O2 Headship)	18th (1st, Div 2)
W2	36th (2nd, Div 3)	34th (17th, Div 2)
O3	–	57th (6th, Div 4)
W3	–	54th (3rd, Div 4)

== Honours ==
=== Headships ===
Caius Boat Club has held the headship (finishing first on the river) of the Lent Bumps and/or May Bumps, for men's and women's crews, in the following years. Headships held for five or more consecutive years are shown in bold.

Bumps headships held by Caius Boat Club
Year	Headships
1840	Men's Headship
1841	Men's Headship
1844	Men's Headship (March and May)
1987	Men's Mays
1998	Men's Mays
1999	Men's Lents, Men's Mays
2000	Men's Mays, Women's Mays
2001	Women's Mays
2002	Men's Lents, Men's Mays, Women's Mays
2003	Men's Lents, Women's Lents, Men's Mays
2004	Men's Lents, Men's Mays
2005	Men's Lents, Men's Mays
2006	**Men's Lents**, **Men's Mays**
2007	Men's Mays
2011	Men's Lents, Men's Mays
2012	Men's Lents, Men's Mays
2013	Men's Lents, Men's Mays
2014	Men's Mays
2015	Men's Lents, **Men's Mays**
2016	Men's Lents
2019	Men's Lents, Men's Mays
2021	Women's June Regatta
2022	Men's Mays
2023	Men's Mays
2024	Women's Mays
2026	Men's Lents

=== Fairbairn Cup ===
Caius crews have won the following senior divisions of the Fairbairn Cup, the head race organised by Jesus College Boat Club and raced on the Cam each Michaelmas Term.

Fairbairn Cup wins
Year	Division	Time
1985	Men's VIIIs	15:18
1985	Women's VIIIs	18:43
1986	Men's VIIIs	15:19
1987	Men's VIIIs	15:15
1999	Men's VIIIs	14:38
2001	Women's VIIIs	15:13
2002	Men's VIIIs	14:42
2002	Women's VIIIs	16:52
2003	Women's IVs	13:49
2004	Men's VIIIs	14:04
2005	Men's VIIIs	14:32
2010	Men's VIIIs	13:36.8
2022	Men's VIIIs	
2023	Men's VIIIs	14:39.5
2025	Open IVs	11:15.9

=== Henley Royal Regatta ===
Henley Royal Regatta wins
Year	Event
1845	Silver Wherries
1896	Visitors' Challenge Cup
1904	Thames Challenge Cup
1914	Thames Challenge Cup
1951	Wyfold Challenge Cup

== Committee ==
The Captain of Boats leads Caius Boat Club for one year, from July to July, handing over at the conclusion of Henley Royal Regatta.

=== Foundation years ===
Officers, foundation years
Year	Captain of Boats	Secretary	Treasurer	Vice-Captain
1827	R. M. Gillies			
1828	J. J. Smith	A. C. Paget		
1829	J. W. Harman	C. Eyres		
1830	J. W. Harman	W. H. Harrison		
1831	W. C. Crawford	T. K. Bowyear		
1832	T. Smith / T. K. Bowyear	A. Ellice / T. Lockley		
1833	W. M. Jones	W. J. Johnson		
1834	W. M. Jones	S. G. B. White		
1835	E. Chapman	T. S. Egan		
1836	F. S. Green	T. S. Egan		
1837	W. B. Brett	A. Jackson		
1838	W. B. Brett	F. Thackeray		
1839	W. H. Yatman	W. R. Croker		
1840	W. R. Croker	R. C. Maul		
1841	R. C. Maul	J. Barry		
1842	H. A. Baumgartner	J. T. Dove		
1843	H. A. Baumgartner	J. T. Dove		
1844	H. A. Baumgartner	T. J. White / J. A. Carmichael		
1845	G. Mann / G. R. Turner	A. S. Harrison		
1846	C. Soames	F. M. Arnold		
1847	H. Morse	Hon. G. R. Gifford		
1848	R. Martin	M. G. Holt		
1849	M. E. Stanbrough	R. B. Stewart		
1850	E. W. Pittar	C. H. Crosse		
1851	J. C. Grahame	P. E. Miles / A. B. Crosse		
1852	T. C. H. Croft	L. W. H. Lockhart		
1853	S. V. Stephenson	E. H. Day		
1854	R. Forster	J. Milner		
1855	R. Forster	J. Milner		
1856	A. Harrison	H. J. S. Winslow		
1857	H. H. Lubbock	B. Wimbush		
1858	B. Wimbush	C. W. Roberts		
1859	W. Harrison	B. H. Reinecker / C. Edwards		
1860	H. B. Winter	S. Dickinson		
1861	A. G. Wailes / E. G. Green	T. Garrett / J. W. D. Brown		
1862	W. H. E. Bagge	C. G. Croft		
1863	W. R. Collyer	E. H. Harrison		
1864	J. D. Finney	J. P. Boswell		
1865	C. E. Underhill	G. H. Murray		
1866	J. Still	H. L. Anderton		
1867	B. J. Shaw	F. Lockwood		
1868	F. Lockwood / A. S. Murray	A. J. Abbey		
1869	R. H. Cautley	G. W. M. Dale		
1870	E. Baggallay	A. S. Valpy		
1871	J. H. Cheadle / W. N. Usher	W. Cunningham		
1872	A. C. Eyre	W. M. Gordon		
1873	E. P. Baily	C. H. Candy		
1874	T. W. Lewis	R. R. Cobbold		
1875	L. G. Pike	F. J. Frankau		
1876	C. Brownlow / A. W. Haig	F. Baggallay		
1877	H. S. Withington	H. G. Lacey		
1878	H. Swift	R. F. Cobbold		
1879	E. D. Withers	W. H. Caldwell		
1880	F. C. S. Sanders	G. H. Lenox-Conyngham		
1881	J. F. Clarkson	E. A. Kinnear		
1882	R. W. Michell	E. L. Burd		
1883	E. J. D. Mitchell	M. Pemberton		
1884	B. V. Sortain	H. O. Beckh		
1885	H. V. Stuart	H. A. Roberts		
1886	H. V. Cobbold	P. W. Pilcher		
1887	W. H. Fisher	J. I. Lee		
1888	J. W. Noble	H. G. Stewart		
1889	G. D. Tripp	W. B. Colbeck		
1890	C. H. Edwards	R. P. Smallwood		
1891	A. Pearson	R. F. Baird		
1892	F. G. Thomas	J. C. A. Rigby		
1893	H. M. Hart-Smith	F. R. Martin		
1894	G. E. Orme	H. C. Scott		
1895	D. Pennington	C. R. Pattison-Muir		
1896	G. E. P. Cave-Moyles	E. C. Hawkins		
1897	O. D. Bruce-Payne	O. M. Green		
1898	T. W. Thompson	G. D. Hignett		
1899	E. N. French	C. Hartree		
1900	T. W. N. Dunn	B. Le Neve Foster		
1901	E. F. Watermeyer	B. Day		
1902	G. P. Norton	H. N. Wegg		
1903	H. D. Gillies	C. H. S. Taylor		
1904	E. P. W. Wedd	C. B. Heald		
1905	A. H. Gosse	T. L. Webb		
1906	E. C. Rayner	T. More		
1907	W. H. Campbell	J. N. Peck		
1908	F. Jarvis	H. A. Watermeyer		
1909	H. C. Whittall	J. C. Russell		
1910	J. C. Russell	J. H. Hunter		
1911	M. D. Methven	C. Grantham-Hill		
1912	E. N. Showell-Rogers	A. C. Walker		
1913	C. W. Beale	R. W. Nichol		
1914–1917	No racing — First World War			
1918	W. M. Walker	W. H. Roberts		
1919	D. A. McGlashan	S. Gaskell		
1920	D. B. Petch	W. S. Philcox		
1921	J. Hamilton	D. A. Bickmore		
1922	A. W. Spence	D. S. A. McDougall		
1923	E. R. Gunther	F. L. Cave-Penney		
1924	P. H. L. Playfair	C. H. Fisher		
1925	C. H. Fisher	J. A. Brown		
1926	J. A. Brown	G. W. V. Pegge		
1927	TBC			
1928	TBC			
1929	TBC			
1930	C. B. Anderson			
1931	TBC			
1932	TBC			
1933	TBC			
1934	TBC			
1935	TBC			
1936	TBC			
1937	TBC			
1938	TBC			
1939	TBC			
1940	TBC			
1941	A. C. Townsend	C. D. Neame		
1942	TBC			
1943	TBC			
1944	TBC			
1945	TBC			
1946	TBC			
1947	TBC			
1948	TBC			
1949	TBC			
1950	J. Walker		M. Clark	
1951	TBC			
1952	G. H. E. Hart	H. K. Litherland		J. N. Stenhouse
1953	TBC			
1954	G. Every	C. B. D. Fearn		D. S. Mair
1955	TBC			
1956	G. W. A. Napier	G. D. McKechnie		R. E. W. Halliwell
1957	R. E. W. Halliwell	A. A. R. Cobbold		P. H. Gray
1958	P. H. Gray	G. B. Cobbold		O. N. Tubbs
1959	O. N. Tubbs			
1960	A. J. Taunton	M. E. Drummond		J. A. Brooks
1961	J. A. Brooks	T. C. Duff		C. H. Gallimore
1962	E. J. Barrington-Ward	R. A. A. Brockington		
1963	K. N. Haarhoff / H. N. Whitfield	A. G. Munro		
1964	H. N. Whitfield	J. M. Bewick		
1965	J. E. J. Goad	D. P. Burgess		J. D. K. Hurford
1966	J. F. Lehman	R. C. Holman		
1967	A. G. D. Duckworth	H. J. Elliot		
1968	J. W. Clark-Lowes	C. R. Hayton		
1969	J. R. Warner	A. M. Peck		
1970	M. J. Adams	C. F. Prime		
1971	C. F. Prime	D. A. Wilson		
1972	J. T. Pinfold	D. D. Clark-Lowes		
1973	J. H. Smith	D. A. Lord		
1974	D. A. Lord	P. C. English		
1975	P. C. English	W. S. H. Laidlaw		O. H. C. Stobbs
1976	W. S. H. Laidlaw	A. E. Cooke-Yarborough		O. H. C. Stobbs
1977	A. E. Cooke-Yarborough	F. G. Gurry / J. P. Treasure		W. Brampton
1978	H. D. L. Birley	A. N. Williams		P. J. Ainsworth
1979	A. N. Williams	W. J. Robinson		I. I. Nissenbaum
1980	W. J. Robinson	R. A. O'Conor		T. E. J. Hems
1981	P. J. Dally			
1982	T. Rochford			
1983	R. A. Warne			

=== Modern era ===
Men's and club officers
Year	Captain of Boats	Senior Treasurer	Secretary	Treasurer	Men's Vice-Captain	Lower Boats Captain
1984	J. W. N. Read		S. A. Kirkpatrick		N. J. Taffinder	P. S. Gordon
1985	S. A. Kirkpatrick		G. C. R. Budden		R. M. Payn	A. G. Strowbridge
1986	G. C. R. Budden		R. A. Brooks		P. J. Rawlins	
1987	J. A. Howard-Sneyd		M. Vesely		G. Smith	R. Sayed
1988	J. C. H. Hardwick					
1989	S. R. Parker		A. Donaldson		M. Esler	T. Sargeant
1990	R. D. Smith		E. J. Crosby		C. W. Goodsall	A. M. Bucha
1991	G. B. Yell		S. Anstey			N. Johnston
1992	N. A. Johnston			J. Doidge-Harrison		A. Baker
1993	A. A. Baker			M. Nicholson		
1994	L. R. Hacker		H. Gearing	A. Driskill-Smith	R. Grantham	C. Hogbin
1995	A. M. M. Flett	Dr S. Maddrell	P. H. Rutkowski	J. Jacobsen	I. Fisher	E. Taylor
1996	P. H. Rutkowski	Dr J. D. McDonald (acting) (Note: McDonald managed the club's finances as acting Senior Treasurer from 1996–97 and formally succeeded Dr S. Maddrell in 1998–99.)	F. Townend	D. Edwards	J. Morris	T. Fardon
1997	T. C. Faroon	Dr J. D. McDonald (acting)	D. J. Tait	J. Morris	A. McLean	S. Pilgrim
1998	D. J. Tait	Dr J. D. McDonald	C. G. Wright	E. Anderson	P. Steen	L. Lewis
1999	P. M. Steen	Dr J. D. McDonald				
2000	H. D. Pim	Dr J. D. McDonald				
2001	D. C. Stokes	Dr J. D. McDonald				
2002	S. E. Holliday / R. D. Bamford	Dr J. D. McDonald				
2003	K. E. Davidson	Dr J. D. McDonald				
2004	R. Jones	Dr J. D. McDonald				
2005	T. Gray	Dr J. D. McDonald				
2006	B. O'Donaghue	Dr J. E. Altham				
2007	K. J. Borland	Dr J. E. Altham				
2008	L. C. Plint	Dr J. E. Altham				
2009	N. G. Cunniffe	Dr J. E. Altham				
2010	P. F. F. Walker	Dr J. E. Altham				
2011	G. M. Beck	Dr J. E. Altham				
2012	G. M. Beck	Dr J. E. Altham				
2013	S. J. L. Lloyd	Dr J. E. Altham				
2014	B. C. Stark	Dr J. E. Altham				
2015	M. S. Leonard	Dr J. E. Altham				
2016	M. Alexander	Dr J. E. Altham				
2017	R. McCorkell	Dr J. E. Altham				
2018	C. Gilmartin	Dr J. E. Altham				
2019	H. R. Bennett	Dr J. E. Altham				
2020	H. R. Bennett	Dr J. E. Altham				
2021	J. M. Nash	Dr J. E. Altham				
2022	E. Radford	Dr M. Amatt				
2023	J. Campbell	Dr M. Amatt				
2024	M. M. Marcheva	Dr A. M. Spencer				
2025	C. Franke	Dr A. M. Spencer				
2026	J. J. Fardon	Dr M. Amatt (Note: Acting Senior Treasurer while Dr A. M. Spencer is on sabbatical.)				

Women's officers
Year	Women's Captain	Women's Secretary	Women's Vice-Captain	Women's Lower Boats Captain
1984	J. Shrewry			
1985	D. Bethell			
1986	H. Woodley			
1987	J. Scrine	H. Tipples		
1988				
1989	L. Day	M. Gray	C. Watson	A. Spence
1990	M. E. Gray		L. Cehreli	J. K. Pollard
1991	J. Pollard			C. Abram
1992	C. Magill			V. Canning
1993	J. Doidge-Harrison			S. Hughson
1994	M. Brij			S. Brydon
1995	H. Gearing			C. Laing
1996	R. Turner			J. Rose
1997	J. Davies			J. Palmer
1998	E. Harron			H. Nakielny
1999	E. Crawford (m. Fardon)			
2000				
2001				
2002				
2003				
2004				
2005				
2006				
2007				
2008				
2009				
2010				
2011				
2012				
2013				
2014				
2015				
2016				
2017				
2018				
2019				
2020				
2021				
2022				
2023				
2024				
2025				
2026				

== CUBC representation ==
The following members of Caius Boat Club are also members of the Cambridge University Boat Club.

Crew and seat details for 1836–1927 from the Caius Boat Club history; venue and result for pre-1968 races from the official Boat Race results archive; 1968–2021 data from CUBC's official crew archive.

=== CUBC Presidents ===
Caius members who have served as President of CUBC or its predecessor clubs:

Caius members who have been CUBC President
Year	Name	Squad
1995	Alison Mowbray	Women's
2006	Tom Edwards	Men's
2022	Bronya Sykes	Women's
2025	Lucy Havard	Women's
2027	Eloise Etherington	Women's

=== Men's Blue Boat ===
Men's Blue Boat members
Year	Rower(s)	Venue	Result
1836	2: F. S. Green; 5: W. M. Jones; C: T. S. Egan	Westminster–Putney	Won
1839	3: J. Abercrombie; 6: W. H. Yatman; 7: W. B. Brett; C: T. S. Egan	Westminster–Putney	Won
1840	C: T. S. Egan	Westminster–Putney	Won
1841	B: W. R. Croker; C: J. M. Croker	Westminster–Putney	Won
1845	B: G. Mann; 5: F. M. Arnold	Putney	Won
1852	C: C. H. Crosse	Putney	Lost
1854	C: C. T. Smith	Putney	Lost
1858	B: H. H. Lubbock	Putney	Won
1866	B: J. Still	Putney	Lost
1867	6: J. Still	Putney	Lost
1868	7: J. Still	Putney	Lost
1869	7: J. Still	Putney	Lost
1873	C: C. H. Candy	Putney	Won
1874	C: C. H. Candy	Putney	Won
1876	2: T. W. Lewis; 5: L. G. Pike	Putney	Won
1877	2: T. W. Lewis; 5: L. G. Pike	Putney	Dead heat
1878	5: L. G. Pike	Putney	Lost
1891	B: J. W. Noble	Putney	Lost
1896	3: D. Pennington	Putney	Lost
1897	3: E. J. D. Taylor; 6: D. Pennington; C: E. C. Hawkins	Putney	Lost
1898	C: E. C. Hawkins	Putney	Lost
1904	7: H. D. Gillies	Putney	Won
1905	5: E. P. W. Wedd; S: C. H. S. Taylor	Putney	Lost
1924	C: J. A. Brown	Putney	Won
1925	7: S. K. Tubbs; C: J. A. Brown	Putney	Won
1926	7: S. K. Tubbs; C: J. A. Brown	Putney	Won
1927	7: S. K. Tubbs; C: J. A. Brown	Putney	Won
1928	R. G. Michell (seat unrecorded)	Putney	Won
1947	I. M. Lang (seat unrecorded)	Putney	Won
1974	5: J. H. Smith	Putney	Lost
1977	4: A. E. Cooke-Yarborough	Putney	Lost
1978	6: A. E. Cooke-Yarborough	Putney	Lost
1980	B: L. W. J. Baart	Putney	Lost
1981	B: L. W. J. Baart	Putney	Lost
1998	2: P. A. Cunningham	Putney	Won
1999	4: A. J. West	Putney	Won
2000	5: A. J. West	Putney	Lost
2001	5: A. J. West	Putney	Won
2002	4: S. Mayer; 5: A. J. West	Putney	Lost
2003	2: M. Kleinz	Putney	Lost
2004	4: S. Mayer	Putney	Won
2005	2: T. Edwards; 5: S. Schulte; 6: M. Kleinz	Putney	Lost
2006	2: T. Edwards; 5: S. Schulte	Putney	Lost
2007	7: S. Schulte	Putney	Won
2008	7: T. Edwards	Putney	Lost
2009	S: S. Stafford	Putney	Lost
2012	4: A. Ross	Putney	Won
2014	3: I. Dawkins	Putney	Lost
2019	C: M. T. O. Holland	Putney	Won
2021	2: B. M. Dyer	Ely	Won

=== Women's Blue Boat ===
1968–2026 data.

Women's Blue Boat members
Year	Rower(s)	Venue	Result
1989	6: A. Kupschus	Henley	Won
1991	6: A. Kupschus	Henley	Lost
1992	B: M. E. Gray	Henley	Won
1994	7: A. Mowbray	Henley	Won
1995	7: A. Mowbray	Henley	Won
1996	4: S. Brydon; S: J. Dowan	Henley	Won
1999	B: J. R. J. Davies; C: J. N. K. Phillips	Henley	Won
2002	C: S. Holliday	Henley	Lost
2005	3: J. Wood	Henley	Won
2006	2: G. McFarland; 6: L. Wordley	Henley	Lost
2007	2: S. Bracegirdle; 6: L. Wordley	Henley	Won
2011	7: F. Sandford	Henley	Lost
2012	7: F. Sandford	Henley	Won
2013	2: F. Sandford; 3: M. H. C. Wilson	Dorney	Lost
2014	6: M. H. C. Wilson	Henley	Lost
2015	5: M. H. C. Wilson	Putney	Lost
2017	C: M. Holland	Putney	Won
2020	3: B. A. Sykes	Putney	No race (COVID-19 pandemic)
2021	7: B. A. Sykes	Ely	Won
2022	5: B. A. Sykes	Putney	Won
2024	6: C. L. Earl	Putney	Won
2025	3: C. L. Earl	Putney	Won
2026	4: C. L. Earl	Putney	Lost

=== Men's reserves (Goldie) ===
1979–2023 data.

Goldie members
Year	Rower(s)	Venue	Result
1979	B: L. W. J. Baart	Putney	Won
1981	4: W. J. Robinson	Putney	Lost
1985	5: J. W. N. Read	Putney	Lost
1997	3: P. A. Cunningham; 5: S. H. O. F. Korbei	Putney	Won
1998	6: S. H. O. F. Korbei	Putney	Lost
2000	2: B. S. J. Cummings	Putney	Lost
2002	3: A. Smith	Putney	Lost
2003	3: A. Smith; 4: D. Barry	Putney	Won
2004	B: J. Local; 6: O. De Groot	Putney	Lost
2005	6: O. de Groot	Putney	Won
2007	3: O. de Groot; S: D. Billings	Putney	Won
2008	B: M. Espin; 7: D. Billings	Putney	Lost
2010	4: M. Whaley	Putney	Won
2011	5: A. G. Ross	Putney	Lost
2012	3: P. Dewhurst	Putney	Lost
2013	5: A. Ross	Putney	Lost
2014	2: P. Walker	Putney	Lost
2019	B: C. MacRae	Putney	Won
2020	2: B. Dyer	Putney	No race (COVID-19 pandemic)
2021	5: R. R. Boericke	Ely	Won
2022	2: G. N. Hawkswell; 6: R. R. Boericke	Putney	Lost
2023	B: G. N. Hawkswell; 4: C. A. MacKenzie; 5: R. R. Boericke	Putney	Won

=== Women's reserves (Blondie) ===
1982–2026 data.

Blondie members
Year	Rower(s)	Venue	Result
1982	5: C. Collins	Henley	Won
1983	3: E. Holmes	Henley	Lost
1987	S: H. Woodley	Henley	Won
1991	B: M. E. Gray	Henley	Won
1995	S: S. Brydon	Henley	Won
1998	3: J. Davies	Henley	Won
2000	6: R. Turner	Henley	Won
2001	B: E. Ponsonby	Nottingham	Lost
2002	7: C. Vigrass	Henley	Lost
2008	4: S. Stewart	Henley	Lost
2009	7: J. L. Gaston	Henley	Won
2016	4: R. A. Elwood	Putney	Won
2017	4: O. L. H. Cousins; C: E. A. H. Lindsay	Putney	Won
2021	B: C. C. King	Ely	Won
2023	4: C. L. Earl	Putney	Won
2024	2: L. J. Havard	Putney	Lost
2025	7: E. S. Etherington	Putney	Won
2026	2: L. J. Havard; Str: E. S. Etherington	Putney	Won

=== Men's lightweights ===
1978–2025 data for the men's lightweight crew.

Men's lightweight members
Year	Rower(s)	Venue	Result
1978	B: P. I. Ainsworth	Henley	Won
1980	4: I. I. Nissenbaum; 7: A. N. Williams	Henley	Won
1984	5: S. A. Kirkpatrick	Henley	Won
1985	2: A. G. Hobart	Henley	Won
1986	3: A. G. Hobart; 6: R. A. Brooks	Henley	Won
1987	6: J. M. Irvine	Henley	Won
1988	7: A. G. Hobart	Henley	Won
1992	B: D. H. B. Burgess	Henley	Lost
1993	7: D. H. B. Burgess	Henley	Won
1998	B: D. J. Tait; 2: M. E. Brelen; C: L. H. A. Watkins	Henley	Won
1999	2: D. J. Tait	Henley	Lost
2000	B: C. G. Wright; 4: L. T. L. Lewis; B: A. P. Harrison (Granta) (Note: Granta is the Lightweight Reserve Crew.)	Henley	Won
2007	S: W. J. Calvert	Henley	Lost
2013	C: J. Dean	Henley	Lost
2018	B: C. MacRae	Dorney	Won
2020	B: L. Andrews	Putney	Lost
2021	B: C. A. McKenzie; 7: C. M. Macrae	Ely	Lost
2022	6: C. A. Mackenzie	Putney	Won
2025	3: W. P. Morris	Putney	Won

=== Women's lightweights ===
1987–2024 data.

Women's lightweight members
Year	Rower(s)	Venue	Result
1987	7: A. Varey	Henley	Won
1994	5: V. Canning	Henley	Won
1995	5: N. Canning	Henley	Lost
1997	B: F. Townend	Henley	Won
2000	B: H. Nakielny	Henley	Lost
2001	2: A. Walker; 7: L. Frawley	Nottingham	Won
2011	5: C. Butler	Henley	Won
2013	7: J. Tovey; C: B. C. Stark	Dorney	Lost
2014	2: C. Ostacchini; 6: E. Barnard; S: J. Tovey	Henley	Lost
2015	3: C. V. Ostacchini; 4: E. Y. X. Walker; S: E. N. Barnard	Henley	Won
2016	2: I. Casley	Henley	Lost
2017	S: E. Thompson	Henley	Won
2018	2: V. Y. F. Walker	Henley	Won
2019	2: V. Y. F. Walker; 5: C. C. King	Henley	Lost
2020	B: V. Y. F. Walker; S: C. E. Walker	Putney	No race (COVID-19 pandemic)
2022	4: C. C. King	Putney	Won
2024	5: A. C. Craig; 6: M. F. Riley	Putney	Won

== Gonville Boat Club ==
Gonville Boat Club (GBC) is a primarily recreational club for former members of the college.

== International medallists ==
- Alison Mowbray, Olympic silver medallist
- Sebastian Mayer, World silver medallist
- Sebastian Schulte, World champion
- Josh West, Olympic silver medallist
