= Jesus College Boat Club (Cambridge) =

Rowing club in Cambridge, UK

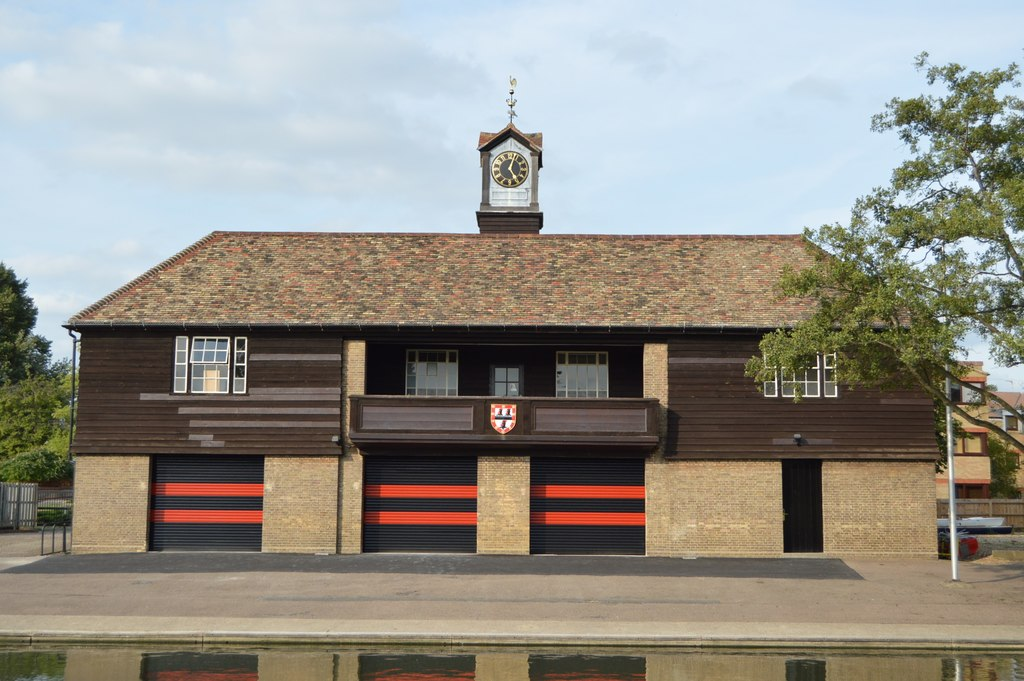

- Location: Cambridge, England
- Coordinates: 52°12′39.54″N 0°7′52.87″E
- Home water: River Cam
- Founded: 1827
- Key people: Ellis Collins (President)
- Membership: 100 (approx)
- University: University of Cambridge
- Affiliations: British Rowing, CUCBC
- Website: www.jesusboatclub.co.uk

Events
- Fairbairn Cup; Henley Royal Regatta Spare Pairs

Notable members
- Humphrey Playford; John Campbell; Thomas Cree; David Burnford

Jesus College Boat Club (often abbreviated to JCBC) is the rowing club for members of Jesus College, Cambridge. It is the most successful Cambridge college boat club, holding the record number of wins for both the May Bumps and the Lent Bumps. It has also had numerous successes at other races, such as Henley Royal Regatta and has provided a large number of rowers for The Boat Race.

The club also run the Fairbairn Cup, the biggest race on the Cam (other than bumps), and is named after the alumnus Steve Fairbairn.

== History ==
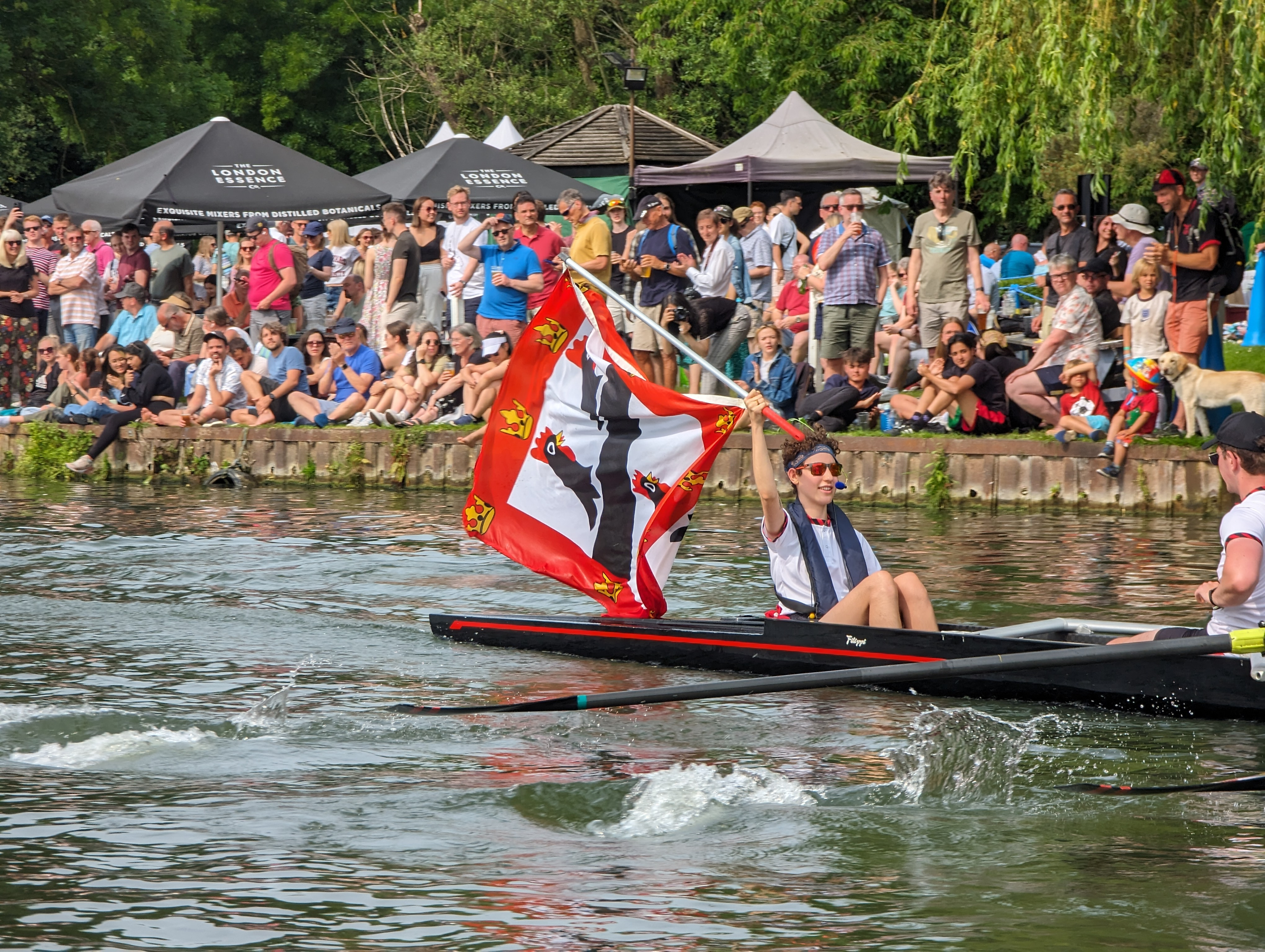
Jesus M2 at May Bumps 2023 with their flag

The club was founded in 1827 and appeared in the first six-oared bumps race that year but performed indifferently. During the early years it rose on occasion to be second and achieved Head of the River in 1841, but remained a minor force until the late 1860s. By 1875 it held Headship again and continued to for eleven years (until 1886) - a record not since equalled. In this time they refurbished the boathouse including the addition of a weathervane and, some years later, a clock tower. Both of which were transferred to the current boathouse. After this period the club's success declined with Trinity Hall Boat Club and Trinity having an almost monopoly of the Headship, until Jesus recovered it in 1909 and 1912-14.

During the inter-war years the club was coached by Steve Fairbairn and held Headship on twelve occasions in the Lents and occupied a top three position for the entire period.

Jesus men have been head of the Lent Bumps on 39 occasions (finishing Head on 159 days) and head of the May Bumps on 24 occasions (finishing Head on 98 days) - more than any other boat club, although Jesus men have not been head in either event since 1974. Jesus also held the headship of the early races (before the Lent and May bumps became separate events) for 11 consecutive years between 1875 and 1886 - a feat which has never been equalled.

In the women's bumps, Jesus took the headship of the Lent Bumps in 1985, 1986, 1987, 2016, 2017, 2018, 2023, 2024, 2025 and 2026 and headship of the May Bumps in 1988, 1993, 1994, 2005, 2007, 2017, 2018, 2023, 2025 and 2026.

=== Henley Royal Regatta ===
JCBC are also one of the historically successful Cambridge colleges at the Henley Royal Regatta, winning the Grand Challenge Cup, the most prestigious event at the regatta, on 3 occasions; 1879, 1885 and in 1947. Jesus also won the Ladies' Challenge Plate on 13 occasions between 1872 and 1958, the Visitors' Challenge Cup on 5 occasions between 1877 and 1936, the Wyfold Challenge Cup on 2 occasions (1882 and 1921), the Stewards' Challenge Cup in 1879 and the Thames Challenge Cup in 1892. Silver Goblets has been won by Humphrey Playford and John Campbell in 1921 and Thomas Cree and David Burnford in 1935. Jesus therefore have a grand total of 25 Henley wins, although the club has not managed an event win since 1958.

== Events ==
JCBC runs two events of note. The first is the Fairbairn Cup Races, named after the famous Jesus oarsman and coach Steve Fairbairn, who began the event in the 1920s. In 1929 Fairbairn donated a cup and the races have continued ever since in their current form, a long distance headrace. Historically, this is raced on the Thursday and Friday after the end of Michaelmas term, Thursday being the novice races and Friday being the senior races. The course has changed over years due to closures for bridge repairs and extreme weather conditions, but in 1990 the start line was made to be Jesus Boathouse Flagpole with the finish at the Little Bridge, some 4.3 km downstream (although the novices race a shorter race, finishing at the railings). The Fairbairn Cup title is awarded to the fastest finishing college men's eight (the cup itself is now again presented, having been lost for a period but found again in 2015). There are also divisions for fours (3.4 km) and novice eights (2.7 km). The race is also entered by other local clubs and university crews, notably the Cambridge University Lightweight Rowing Club (CULRC) normally enters, but recent years have also seen entries from the Oxford University Lightweight Rowing Club (OULRC) and occasionally the Cambridge University Boat Club (CUBC) itself.

JCBC has also run the Henley Spare Pairs Race on the day before Henley Royal Regatta. This event runs from the barrier to the regatta finish and is open to spare pairs of registered regatta entries.

== Honours ==
=== Henley Royal Regatta ===
Year	Races won
1872	Ladies' Challenge Plate
1873	Ladies' Challenge Plate
1876	Ladies' Challenge Plate
1877	Ladies' Challenge Plate & Visitors' Challenge Cup
1878	Ladies' Challenge Plate
1879	Grand Challenge Cup & Stewards' Challenge Cup
1882	Wyfold Challenge Cup
1885	Grand Challenge Cup
1892	Thames Challenge Cup
1902	Visitors' Challenge Cup
1908	Ladies' Challenge Plate
1921	Silver Goblets & Nickalls' Challenge Cup & Wyfold Challenge Cup
1926	Ladies' Challenge Plate
1928	Ladies' Challenge Plate
1931	Ladies' Challenge Plate
1932	Visitors' Challenge Cup
1934	Ladies' Challenge Plate
1935	Silver Goblets & Nickalls' Challenge Cup & Visitors' Challenge Cup
1936	Visitors' Challenge Cup
1946	Ladies' Challenge Plate
1947	Grand Challenge Cup
1953	Ladies' Challenge Plate
1958	Ladies' Challenge Plate

=== Boat Race representatives ===
The following rowers represented the club at the time of their participation in The Boat Race.

Men's boat race

Year	Name
1829	W. T. Thompson
1836	Edmund Stanley
1839	E. Stanley
1840	John M. Ridley
1841	John M. Ridley
1842	W. Watson
1842	John M. Ridley
1859	H. J. Chaytor
1860	H. J. Chaytor
1861	H. J. Chaytor
1869	J. H. Ridley
1870	J. H. Ridley
1872	C. H. Roberts (cox)
1873	E. Hoskyns
1873	W. C. Lecky-Browne
1873	H. E. Rhodes
1874	G. F. Armytage
1874	W. C. Lecky-Browne
1874	H. E. Rhodes
1875	E. A. Phillips
1875	H. E. Rhodes
1876	P. W. Brancker
1876	C. Gurdon
1876	T. E. Hockin
1876	H. E. Rhodes
1876	C. D. Shafto
1877	B. G. Hoskyns
1877	C. Gurdon
1877	T. E. Hockin
1877	C. D. Shafto
1878	Ll. R. Jones
1878	C. Gurdon
1878	T. E. Hockin
1878	E. H. Prest
1879	E. H. Prest
1879	C. Gurdon
1879	T. E. Hockin
1879	C. Fairbairn
1880	E. H. Prest
1880	C. N. L. Armytage
1880	W. W. Baillie
1881	P. W. Atkin
1881	A. M. Hutchinson
1882	Ll. R. Jones
1882	A. M. Hutchinson
1882	P. W. Atkin
1882	Steve Fairbairn
1883	P. W. Atkin
1883	Steve Fairbairn
1884	F. Straker
1884	C. E. Tyndale Biscoe (cox)
1886	Steve Fairbairn
1887	Steve Fairbairn
1892	R. G. Neill
1898	A. W. Swanston
1902	T. Drysdale
1906	J. H. F. Benham
1906	H. M. Goldsmith
1907	J. H. F. Benham

Year	Name
1907	H. M. Goldsmith
1908	F. H. Jerwood
1908	G. E. Fairbairn
1909	H. E. Swanston
1910	H. J. S. Shields
1910	C. A. Skinner (cox)
1911	G. E. Fairbairn
1911	C. A. Skinner (cox)
1912	J. H. Goldsmith
1912	C. A. Skinner (cox)
1913	G. A. Fisher
1913	L. E. Ridley (cox)
1914	L. E. Ridley (cox)
1920	Humphrey Playford
1920	John Cambell
1921	Humphrey Playford
1921	John Cambell
1922	Humphrey Playford
1923	S. H. Heap
1924	G. E. G. Goddard
1925	G. E. G. Goddard
1926	J. B. Bell
1927	J. B. Bell
1930	P. N. Carpmael
1931	P. N. Carpmael
1934	J. N. Duckworth (cox)
1935	E. A. Szilagyi
1935	J. N. Duckworth (cox)
1936	Thomas Cree
1936	David Burnford
1936	J. N. Duckworth (cox)
1937	Thomas Cree
1937	T. B. Langton
1937	A. Burrough
1938	B. T. Coulton
1938	A. Burrough
1938	T. B. Langton
1938	J. L. L. Savill
1939	B. T. Coulton
1939	A. Burrough
1939	J. L. L. Savil
1946	D. J. D. Perrins
1946	G. E. C. Thomas
1947	N. S. Rogers
1948	C. D. R. Barton
1948	K. T. Lindsay
1949	G. S. S. Ludford
1949	D. V. Lynch Odhams
1950	A. C. R. Armstrong-Jones
1954	D. K. Hill
1954	M. J. Marshall
1954	J. W. Tanburn (cox)
1955	D. K. Hill
1955	G. T. Harris (cox)
1956	M. G. Delahooke
1956	J. P. M. Denny (cox)
1957	J. R. Meadows
1957	M. G. Delahooke
1959	J. Beveridge

Year	Name
1960	J. Beveridge
1961	R. J. Fraser
1961	J. Beveridge
1962	C. T. Davey
1962	J. M. S. Lecky
1963	A. V. Cooke
1964	J. W. Fraser
1964	C. J. T. Davey
1965	J. W. Fraser
1966	P. G. R. Delafield
1967	P. G. R. Delafield
1968	P. G. R. Delafield
1970	Chris Baillieu
1970	C. J. Rogridgues
1971	Chris Baillieu
1971	N. W. James
1971	D. L. Maxwell
1971	C. J. Rodrigues
1972	Chris Baillieu
1972	N. W. James
1972	D. L. Maxwell
1973	Chris Baillieu
1973	M. O. K. Webber
1974	H. J. H. Wheare (cox)
1976	R. Harpum
1979	A. G. Phillips
1980	T. W. Whitney
1980	A. G. Phillips
1980	C. J. Wigglesworth (cox)
1981	A. G. Phillips
1981	C. J. Wigglesworth (cox)
1982	E. M. G. Pearson
1983	E. M. G. Pearson
1984	E. M. G. Pearson
1987	Nicholas J. Grundy
1988	Nicholas J. Grundy
1991	Nicholas J. Clarry
1992	Nicholas J. Clarry
1993	Sinclair M. Gore
1994	Sinclair M. Gore
1998	Toby J. Wallace
1999	Toby J Wallace
1999	Tom Stallard
2000	Tom Stallard
2001	Tom Stallard
2002	Tom Stallard
2008	Tim Perkins
2018	Spencer Furey
2021	Seb Benzecry
2023	Seb Benzecry
2024	Seb Benzecry

Women's boat race

Year	Name
2015	Caroline Reid
2016	Hannah Roberts
2018	Paula Wesselmann
2019	Kate Horvat
2019	Hugh Spaughton (cox)
2023	Jenna Armstrong
2023	Isabelle Bastian
2024	Jenna Armstrong
2025	Natasha Morrice

== See also ==
- Cambridge University Combined Boat Clubs
- University rowing (UK)
