= The Boat Race 1937 =

89th Boat Race
- Date: 24 March 1937
- Winner: Oxford
- Margin of victory: 3 lengths
- Winning time: 22 minutes 39 seconds
- Overall record (Cambridge–Oxford): 47–41
- Umpire: Harold Rickett (Cambridge)

Other races
- Women's winner: Oxford

The 89th Boat Race took place on 24 March 1937. Held annually, the Boat Race is a side-by-side rowing race between crews from the Universities of Oxford and Cambridge along the River Thames. In a race umpired by the former Cambridge rower and coach Harold Rickett, Oxford won by three lengths in a time of 22 minutes 39 seconds. It was their first success since the 1923 race and ended Cambridge's record streak of 13 wins. The victory took the overall record in the event to 47–41 in Cambridge's favour.

== Background ==
The Boat Race is a side-by-side rowing competition between the University of Oxford (sometimes referred to as the "Dark Blues") and the University of Cambridge (sometimes referred to as the "Light Blues"). The race was first held in 1829, and since 1845 has taken place on the 4.2-mile (6.8 km) Championship Course on the River Thames in southwest London. The rivalry is a major point of honour between the two universities; it is followed throughout the United Kingdom and, as of 2014, broadcast worldwide. Cambridge went into the race as reigning champions, having won the 1936 race by five lengths, and led overall with 47 victories to Oxford's 40 (excluding the "dead heat" of 1877). The Light Blues had won thirteen consecutive races coming into this year's event.

Cambridge were coached by J. Beresford Jr, J. R. F. Best, F. E. Hellyer (who had rowed for the Light Blues in the 1910 and 1911 races) and Kenneth Payne (who rowed for Cambridge in the 1932 and 1934 races, and had coached Oxford in the 1935 and 1936 races). Oxford's coaches were P. C. Mallam (a four-time Dark Blue who had rowed in the 1921, 1922, 1923 and 1924 races), Guy Oliver Nickalls (who had rowed three times between 1921 and 1923) and William Rathbone (who rowed for Oxford in the 1926 and 1927 races). The umpire for the race was the former Cambridge rower Harold Rickett who had rowed for the Light Blues three times, in the 1930, 1931 and 1932 races. He had also coached them for the 1933 race.

The special correspondent for The Observer suggested that the race would be the finest for some years, concluding that "a win for Oxford would do much good to English rowing".

== Crews ==
The Oxford crew weighed an average of 12 st 13.5 lb (82.1 kg), 7.75 pounds (3.5 kg) per rower more than their opponents. Cambridge saw three rowers return to the crew with Boat Race experience, including McAllister Lonnon who was taking part in his third consecutive event. Oxford's boat contained four former Blues, including David Michael De Rueda Winser who was also making his third appearance in the Boat Race. Oxford's number six Jan Sturrock won a silver medal at the 1936 Summer Olympics in the Men's coxless fours. His crew-mate John Cherry, and Cambridge's Thomas Cree, Hugh Mason and Lonnon all rowed in the Men's eight for Great Britain in the 1936 Games, finishing fourth. Cambridge's Cree and cox T. H. Hunter were the only non-British participants registered, both of whom hailed from Australia.

Seat	Oxford			Cambridge		
Seat	Name	College	Weight	Name	College	Weight
Bow	M. G. C. Ashby	New College	12 st 4 lb	T. S. Cree	Jesus	11 st 8 lb
2	D. M. de R. Winser	Corpus Christi	12 st 0 lb	H. W. Mason	Trinity Hall	11 st 10 lb
3	R. R. Stewart	Magdalen	13 st 0 lb	M. Bradley	Pembroke	13 st 1 lb
4	R. G. Rowe	University	12 st 11 lb	D. M. W. Napier	Magdalene	12 st 9 lb
5	J. P. Burrough	St Edmund Hall	13 st 7 lb	M. P. Lonnon (P)	3rd Trinity	12 st 12 lb
6	J. D. Sturrock	Magdalen	14 st 4 lb	T. B. Langton	Jesus	13 st 4 lb
7	J. C. Cherry	Brasenose	13 st 11 lb	A. Burrough	Jesus	12 st 1 lb
Stroke	A. B. Hodgson	Oriel	12 st 2 lb	R. J. L. Perfitt	Trinity Hall	12 st 0.5 lb
Cox	G. J. P. Merrifield	St Edmund Hall	7 st 11 lb	T. H. Hunter	Trinity Hall	8 st 0 lb
Source: (P) – boat club president, J. S. Lewes acted as Oxford's non-rowing president

== Race ==
The Championship Course along which the Boat Race is contested

Cambridge won the toss and elected to start from the Surrey station, handing the Middlesex side of the river to Oxford. In calm weather, umpire Rickett started the race at 11:35 a.m. A false start ensued, with Rickett failing to hear Oxford state that they were not ready to start. Rickett restarted the race and, out-rating their opponents, Cambridge were half a length ahead after the first minute. They held the same advantage by Craven Steps, but a spurt from Oxford's stroke A. B. Hodgson saw the Dark Blues draw level. Following some errant steering from Cambridge's cox Hunter, Oxford pulled away to lead by a canvas-length by the time the crews passed the Mile Post.

As they passed the Crab Tree pub, the Cambridge stroke R. J. L. Perfitt put in a spurt which made little difference as Oxford continued to lead by Harrods Furniture Depository. Steering away from the Light Blues to avoid a collision, Oxford lost their lead as the crews passed under Hammersmith Bridge level. Another spurt from Perfitt saw the Light Blues a third of a length up by the Doves pub as the crews headed into Chiswick Reach. This time it was Oxford's turn to steer clear of a collision, losing most of their lead by Chiswick Steps, but heading over towards the Middlesex shore, they caught the best of the tide. The Dark Blues passed below Barnes Bridge three-quarters of a length ahead, and although Cambridge burst to out-rate Oxford by three strokes per minute, they failed to make any impression and Oxford pulled further ahead.

Oxford won by three lengths in a time of 22 minutes 39 seconds, securing their first victory since the 1923 race. It was both the slowest winning time and the narrowest margin of victory since 1877. It was declared by former Oxford rower E. P. Evans as being "one of the most exciting races ever seen on the tideway" and "a truly magnificent victory for the Oxford crew". The rowing correspondent in The Times stated that "not since 1921 has there been such a great race". He went on to suggest "it was one of the greatest races".
