= The Boat Race 1947 =

93rd Boat Race
- Date: 29 March 1947
- Winner: Cambridge
- Margin of victory: 10 lengths
- Winning time: 23 minutes 1 second
- Overall record (Cambridge–Oxford): 49–43
- Umpire: D. T. Raikes (Oxford)

The 93rd Boat Race took place on 29 March 1947. Held annually, the Boat Race is a side-by-side rowing race between crews from the Universities of Oxford and Cambridge along the River Thames in London. In a race umpired by former Oxford rower D. T. Raikes, Cambridge won by ten lengths in a time of 23 minutes 1 second, taking the overall record in the event to 49–43 in their favour.

== Background ==
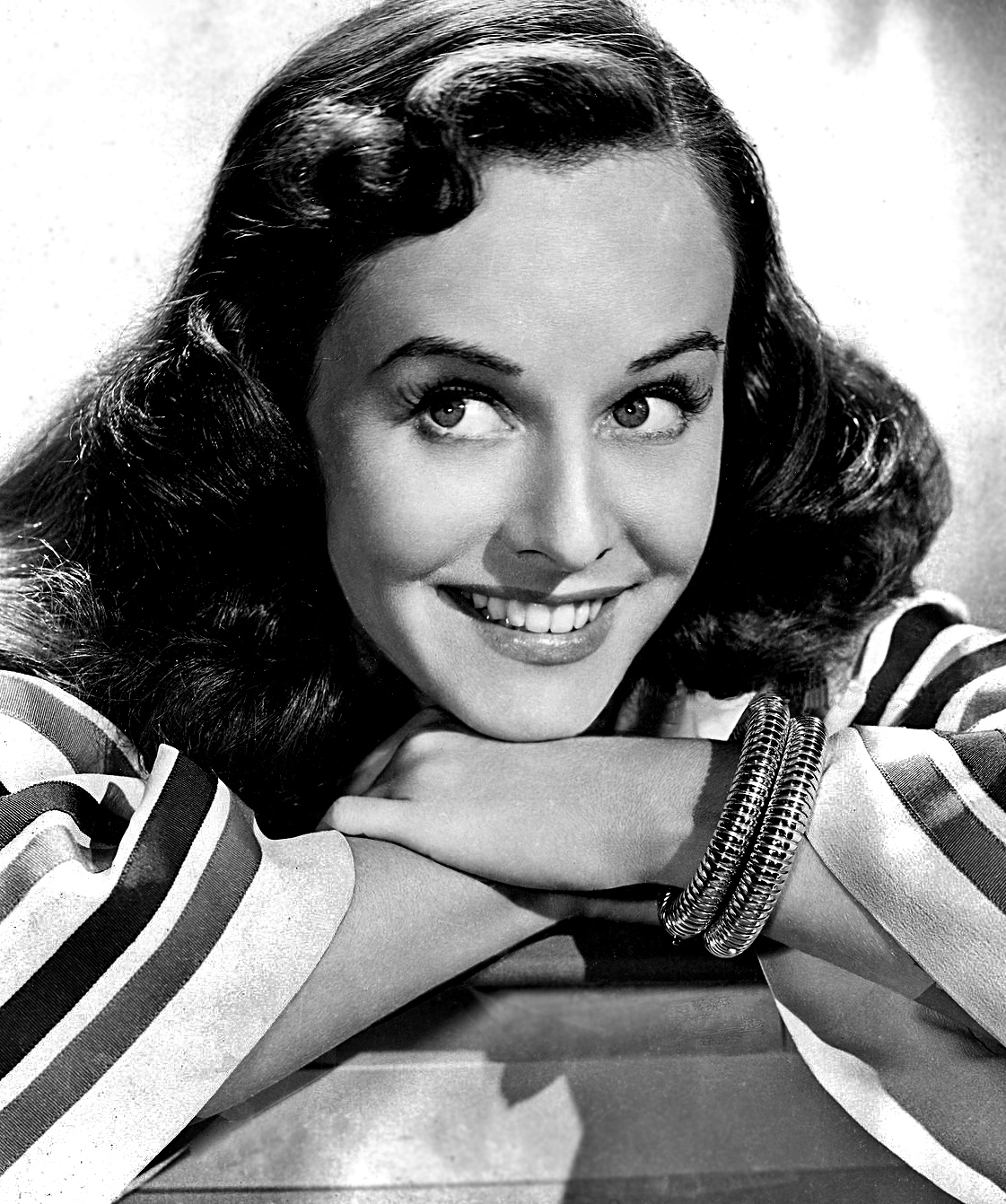
American actress Paulette Goddard watched the race on board a press launch.

The Boat Race is a side-by-side rowing competition between the University of Oxford (sometimes referred to as the "Dark Blues") and the University of Cambridge (sometimes referred to as the "Light Blues"). The race was first held in 1829, and since 1845 has taken place on the 4.2-mile (6.8 km) Championship Course on the River Thames in southwest London. The rivalry is a major point of honour between the two universities and followed throughout the United Kingdom and worldwide. Oxford went into the race as reigning champions, having won the 1946 race by three lengths, with Cambridge leading overall with 48 victories to Oxford's 43 (excluding the "dead heat" of 1877).

Oxford's coaches were R. E. Eason (who rowed for the Dark Blues in the 1924 race), P. C. Mallam (four-time Blue between 1921 and 1924) and Guy Oliver Nickalls (who rowed three times for Oxford between 1921 and 1923). Cambridge were coached by John Houghton Gibbon (who rowed for the Light Blues in the 1899 and 1900 races), Hugh Mason (who represented Cambridge in the 1936 and 1937 races) and Peter Haig-Thomas (four-time Blue between 1902 and 1905). The umpire for the race was former Oxford rower D. T. Raikes who had represented the Dark Blues in the 1920, 1921 and 1922 races. Among the spectators were Geoffrey Fisher, the Archbishop of Canterbury, and American actress Paulette Goddard. It was the first year that souvenir programmes were sold, the proceeds of which would help to fund the two boat clubs.

The rowing correspondent for The Times suggested that Oxford could win, claiming they had an "embarras de richesse" while Cambridge "started this year with a grievous shortage of material". In a practice row, the rowing correspondent for The Manchester Guardian stated that "Cambridge showed much better form" while Oxford "did rather more hard work", including practicing their start from a stakeboat. Oxford were reported as being favourites in the Dundee Courier, with the prediction that the win could be determined by who won the toss. That view was echoed in the Dundee Evening Telegraph, who also suggested that Oxford were favourites yet "abnormal flooding" would favour the crew who won the toss.

== Crews ==
The Cambridge crew weighed an average of 12 st 5 lb (78.3 kg), 5.5 pounds (2.49 kg) per rower more than their opponents. Oxford saw four rowers with Boat Race experience return to the crew, including J. R. W. Gleave, R. M. A. Bourne, P. N. Brodie and stroke A. J. R. Purssell Cambridge's boat contained just one crew member who had taken part in the event before, in cox G. H. C. Fisher. The Cambridge University Boat Club president, M. A. Nicholson was declared unfit to row following a series of bouts of asthma. All participants in the race were registered as British.

Seat	Oxford			Cambridge		
Seat	Name	College	Weight	Name	College	Weight
Bow	D. G. Jamieson (P)	Magdalen	11 st 9.5 lb	A. P. Mellows	Clare	11 st 12 lb
2	P. H. Mathews	St Edmund Hall	11 st 11 lb	D. J. C. Meyrick	Trinity Hall	11 st 0 lb
3	D. A. M. Mackay	Lincoln	13 st 3 lb	N. S. Rogers	Jesus	12 st 9 lb
4	T. D. Raikes	Trinity	12 st 3 lb	P. J. Garner	King's	11 st 12 lb
5	J. R. W. Gleave	Magdalen	12 st 5 lb	W. A. D. Windham	Christ's	13 st 4 lb
6	R. M. A. Bourne	New College	11 st 4 lb	I. M. Lang	Gonville and Caius	13 st 8 lb
7	P. N. Brodie	Oriel	11 st 4 lb	A. S. F. Butcher	Queens'	11 st 13 lb
Stroke	A. J. R. Purssell	Oriel	11 st 12 lb	G. C. Richardson	Magdalene	12 st 10 lb
Cox	A. Palgrave-Brown	Queen's	8 st 10 lb	G. H. C. Fisher	1st & 3rd Trinity	8 st 10 lb
Source: (P) – boat club president, M. A. Nicholson acted as Cambridge's non-rowing president

== Race ==
The Championship Course along which the Boat Race is contested

Oxford won the toss and elected to start from the Surrey station, handing the Middlesex side of the river to Cambridge. The race was started by umpire Raikes at 6:15 p.m, in "rain and dismal weather". Out-rating Oxford by two strokes per minute, the Light Blues took an immediate lead and by Craven Steps they were pulling away from their opponents. As both crews passed the Mile Post, Cambridge were almost clear by two lengths, and despite a spurt from the Dark Blues at the Harrods Furniture Depository, the Light Blues maintained their lead. Oxford trailed Cambridge by three and a half lengths as the Light Blues passed below Hammersmith Bridge and moved into Oxford's water, effectively ending the race as a contest.

Cambridge continued to build their lead, ahead by six lengths at Chiswick Steps and eight by Barnes Bridge. They passed the finishing post ten lengths ahead in a time of 23 minutes 1 second, their first win since the 1939 race. It was the slowest winning time since the 1877 race and the winning margin was the largest since the 1928 race. The victory took the overall record in the event to 49–43 in Cambridge's favour. The rowing correspondent for The Times suggested the "Boat Race was as disappointing as the weather in which it was rowed".
