= The Boat Race 1936 =

88th Boat Race
- Date: 4 April 1936
- Winner: Cambridge
- Margin of victory: 5 lengths
- Winning time: 21 minutes 6 seconds
- Overall record (Cambridge–Oxford): 47–40
- Umpire: Francis Escombe (Cambridge)

Other races
- Women's winner: Oxford

The 88th Boat Race took place on 4 April 1936. Held annually, the Boat Race is a side-by-side rowing race between crews from the Universities of Oxford and Cambridge along the River Thames. Umpired by the former Boat Race coach Francis Escombe, Cambridge won by five lengths in a time of 21 minutes 6 seconds. The record thirteenth consecutive victory took the overall record in the event to 47–40 in Cambridge's favour. The heaviest crew up to that year in Boat Race history, Cambridge was the first to weigh more than an average of 13 st (82.4 kg) per individual.

== Background ==
The Boat Race is a side-by-side rowing competition between the University of Oxford (sometimes referred to as the "Dark Blues") and the University of Cambridge (sometimes referred to as the "Light Blues"). The race was first held in 1829, and since 1845 has taken place on the 4.2-mile (6.8 km) Championship Course on the River Thames in southwest London. The rivalry is a major point of honour between the two universities; it is followed throughout the United Kingdom and, as of 2014, broadcast worldwide. Cambridge went into the race as reigning champions, having won the 1935 race by four and a half lengths, and led overall with 46 victories to Oxford's 40 (excluding the "dead heat" of 1877).

Oxford were coached by William Rathbone (who rowed for Oxford in the 1926 and 1927 races), and former Cambridge rowers John Houghton Gibbon (who had rowed for the Light Blues in the 1899 and 1900 races) and Kenneth Payne (who rowed for Cambridge in the 1932 and 1934 races). Cambridge's coaches were F. E. Hellyer (who had rowed for the Light Blues in the 1910 and 1911 races), B. C. Johnstone, D. H. E. McCowen (who had rowed in the 1932 race) and C. H. Rew (who had coached the Light Blues the previous year). The race was umpired by Francis Jerram Escombe who had coached Cambridge fifteen times between 1904 and 1934, and Oxford the previous year. Both boats were made by Sims and both crews used Ayling's oars.

The rowing correspondent for The Times suggested that on arrival at Putney, "Cambridge were almost certainly the fastest crew ever to come to the tideway. Oxford were equally certain one of the worst". He went on to report that while Cambridge still looked "remarkably neat", they "have actually got slower"; at the same time Oxford "improved their pace, if not their appearance, in a measure that most critics would have thought quite impossible".

== Crews ==
The Cambridge crew weighed an average of 13 st 0.5 lb (82.6 kg), 3.75 pounds (1.7 kg) per rower more than their opponents, the heaviest crew ever at the time. It was the first time in the race history that a crew weighed more than an average of 13 st (82.4 kg). Oxford saw two participants with Boat Race experience return to the crew in number five B. J. Sciortino and stroke D. M. de R. Winser. Cambridge's crew contained five former Blues, four of whom were making their third appearance including cox Noel Duckworth, and Jack Wilson and Ran Laurie, who would win the Coxless pairs Gold medal at the 1948 Olympics. Three of the race participants were registered as non-British: Oxford's Jock Lewes and S. R. C. Wood, along with Cambridge's Thomas Cree were all Australian.

Seat	Cambridge			Oxford		
Seat	Name	College	Weight	Name	College	Weight
Bow	T. S. Cree	Jesus	12 st 2 lb	M. G. C. Ashby	New College	12 st 0 lb
2	H. W. Mason	Trinity Hall	12 st 8 lb	J. S. Lewes	Christ Church	12 st 7.5 lb
3	G. M. Lewis	Pembroke	13 st 0 lb	K. V. Garside	St John's	12 st 12 lb
4	D. W. Burnford	Jesus	13 st 4 lb	S. R. C. Wood	Brasenose	12 st 7 lb
5	M. P. Lonnon	3rd Trinity	13 st 6 lb	B. J. Sciortino (P)	University	12 st 11 lb
6	D. G. Kingsford	Pembroke	13 st 7 lb	J. D. Sturrock	Magdalen	14 st 1.5 lb
7	J. H. T. Wilson (P)	Pembroke	13 st 0 lb	J. C. Cherry	Brasenose	13 st 7 lb
Stroke	W. G. R. M. Laurie	Selwyn	13 st 6 lb	D. M. de R. Winser	Corpus Christi	11 st 12 lb
Cox	J. N. Duckworth	Jesus	8 st 7 lb	M. A. Kirke	Keble	8 st 7 lb
Source: (P) – boat club president

== Race ==
The Championship Course along which the Boat Race is contested

Oxford won the toss and elected to start from the Surrey station, handing the Middlesex side of the river to Cambridge. Umpire Escombe started the race at 11:40 a.m in relatively calm water. Cambridge made the quicker start, out-rating the Dark Blues, but struggled in patches of rougher water such that Oxford held a slight lead by the end of the Fulham Wall. With the bend in the river against them, the Dark Blues held a half-length lead as the crews passed the Mile Post and, according to former Oxford rower E. P. Evans, writing in The Manchester Guardian, "were going well ... and seemed to be forging ahead at every stroke". At Harrods Furniture Depository, Cambridge stroke Ran Laurie pushed on to reduce Oxford's advantage as the long bend in the river favoured them: the crews passed under Hammersmith Bridge with Cambridge trailing by half a length.

A series of spurts from Cambridge combined with intelligent steering from their cox, pushing the Dark Blue boat out of the tide, resulted in a reversal of fortune with Cambridge leading, and by the end of Chiswick Eyot, they were nearly clear of Oxford. Passing Chiswick Steps four seconds ahead, the Light Blues continued to increase their advantage, passing below Barnes Bridge four lengths ahead. They passed the finishing post five lengths ahead in a time of 21 minutes 6 seconds. It was the largest winning margin since the 1929 race and the slowest winning time since the 1925 race when Oxford sank in adverse conditions. It was Cambridge's thirteenth consecutive victory, a record streak in the history of the Boat Race, and took the overall record in the event to 47–40 in their favour. E. P. Evans wrote that "no praise is too much for the gallant Oxford crew" while of Cambridge he noted "though they may not have produced their best form in the early part of the race they made up for it later". The rowing correspondent for The Times stated that "it was an exciting race over the first half of the course" and praised the Light Blues saying "all credit is due to the Cambridge crew for the manner in which they recovered themselves after being led through such bad water". William Beach Thomas, writing in The Observer, claimed "Cambridge were described as the best crew in the chronicles of rowing kings, and Oxford the very worst".
