= The Boat Race 1938 =

90th Boat Race
- Date: 2 April 1938
- Winner: Oxford
- Margin of victory: 2 lengths
- Winning time: 20 minutes 30 seconds
- Overall record (Cambridge–Oxford): 47–42
- Umpire: Harold Rickett (Cambridge)

The 90th Boat Race took place on 2 April 1938. Held annually, the Boat Race is a side-by-side rowing race between crews from the Universities of Oxford and Cambridge along the River Thames. It was the first Boat Race to be televised. In a race umpired by the former Cambridge rower and coach Harold Rickett, Oxford won by two lengths in a time of 20 minutes 30 seconds. The victory took the overall record in the event to 47–42 in Cambridge's favour.

== Background ==
The Boat Race is a side-by-side rowing competition between the University of Oxford (sometimes referred to as the "Dark Blues") and the University of Cambridge (sometimes referred to as the "Light Blues"). The race was first held in 1829, and since 1845 has taken place on the 4.2-mile (6.8 km) Championship Course on the River Thames in southwest London. The rivalry is a major point of honour between the two universities; it is followed throughout the United Kingdom and, as of 2014, broadcast worldwide. Oxford went into the race as reigning champions, having won the 1937 race by three lengths, with Cambridge leading overall with 47 victories to Oxford's 41 (excluding the "dead heat" of 1877).

Cambridge were coached by D. H. E. McCowen (who had rowed in the 1932 race), Derek Mays-Smith, R. H. H. Symonds (who had rowed in the 1931 race) and C. W. Wise. Oxford's coaches were P. C. Mallam (a four-time Dark Blue who had rowed in the 1921, 1922, 1923 and 1924 races), Guy Oliver Nickalls (who had rowed three times between 1921 and 1923) and J. H. Page. The umpire for the race was the former Cambridge rower Harold Rickett who had rowed for the Light Blues three times, in the 1930, 1931 and 1932 races. He had also coached them for the 1933 race, and had umpired the race the previous year.

Oxford had been rated as favourites to win the race throughout their three months of training. The rowing correspondent for The Times noted that "both crews are absolutely first-rate exponents of their respective styles" and that "both coxes are first-rate". Oxford elected to use the same boat as they raced in for the previous year's event, while Cambridge used a new vessel; both were built by George Sims Boatbuilding Company of Hammersmith. It was the first year that the Boat Race was televised, which, according to the television correspondent for The Observer, "was a great success" and "not even the umpire knew more about the race than we [the viewers]".

== Crews ==
The Oxford crew weighed an average of 12 st 13.75 lb (82.2 kg), 7.25 pounds (3.3 kg) per rower more than their opponents. Cambridge's crew contained three participants with Boat Race experience, in A. Burrough, T. B. Langton and T. H. Hunter. Oxford saw five former Blues return to the crew, including John Cherry who was making his third consecutive appearance in the event. Two of the participants were registered as non-British, both in the Cambridge crew: number six G. Keppel and cox T. H. Hunter were both American.

Seat	Oxford			Cambridge		
Seat	Name	College	Weight	Name	College	Weight
Bow	J. L. Garton	Magdalen	11 st 12 lb	B. T. Coulton	Jesus	10 st 13 lb
2	H. M. Young	Trinity	12 st 12 lb	A. M. Turner	Corpus Christi College	11 st 12 lb
3	R. R. Stewart	Magdalen	12 st 13 lb	A. Burrough	Jesus	12 st 7 lb
4	H. A. W. Forbes	Magdalen	13 st 2 lb	T. B. Langton (P)	Jesus	13 st 9 lb
5	J. P. Burrough	St Edmund Hall	13 st 7 lb	J. L. L. Savill	Jesus	12 st 13 lb
6	F. A. L. Waldron	Trinity	13 st 10 lb	G. Keppel	Trinity Hall	13 st 6 lb
7	J. C. Cherry (P)	Brasenose	13 st 11 lb	A. Campbell	Selwyn	12 st 4 lb
Stroke	A. B. Hodgson	Oriel	12 st 0 lb	D. S. M. Eadie	1st Trinity	12 st 1 lb
Cox	G. J. P. Merrifield	St Edmund Hall	8 st 1 lb	T. H. Hunter	Trinity Hall	8 st 7 lb
Source: (P) – boat club president

== Race ==
The Championship Course along which the Boat Race is contested

Cambridge won the toss and elected to start from the Surrey station, handing the Middlesex side of the river to Oxford. Umpire Rickett started the race at 2 p.m. in "fine" weather conditions and with a strong tide. Despite being out-rated by three strokes per minute, Oxford took an immediate lead and were over half a length ahead by the time they passed Fulham Wall. With the Middlesex bend in their favour, Oxford increased their lead to a length and a half ahead by the Mile Post. Cambridge's stroke Eadie called for a push just before Harrods Furniture Depository and the Light Blues began to reduce the deficit, and although the Dark Blues responded, by the time the crews passed below Hammersmith Bridge, Oxford's lead was down to half a length.

Cambridge's faster stroke rate saw them gain on the Dark Blues and by the time the passed HMS Stork, they held a quarter-length lead, although by Chiswick Steps the lead was gone and Oxford led by a quarter of a length. They passed below Barnes Bridge with that lead as both crews headed into rough water. According to the special correspondent writing in The Manchester Guardian, "a sea awaited them". Both crews took on water in the difficult conditions but the Dark Blues prevailed. Oxford won by two lengths in a time of 20 minutes 30 seconds, their second consecutive win. It was the narrowest margin of victory since the 1930 race and the fastest since the 1935 race. The victory took the overall record in the event to 47–42 in Cambridge's favour. The correspondent for The Manchester Guardian described it as "excellent", and "a great race in the best traditions" The Observer's correspondent suggested that "the race will rank as one of the closest and most exciting in which the two Universities have ever engaged." The former Oxford rower, G. I. F. Thomson, writing in The Observer, claimed "one can scarcely have hoped for a more interesting or thrilling race". Oxford's number seven and boat club president Cherry said "I hope this will show that last year's victory was not a flash in the pan". His counterpart, T. B. Langton noted that his crew "had an excellent race and enjoyed every minute of it".
