= The Boat Race 1970 =

116th Boat Race
- Date: 28 March 1970
- Winner: Cambridge
- Margin of victory: 3 1/2 lengths
- Winning time: 20 minutes 22 seconds
- Overall record (Cambridge–Oxford): 64–51
- Umpire: A. Burrough (Cambridge)

Other races
- Reserve winner: Goldie
- Women's winner: Cambridge

The 116th Boat Race took place on 28 March 1970. Held annually, it is a side-by-side rowing race between crews from the Universities of Oxford and Cambridge along the River Thames. It was won by Cambridge who passed the finishing post 3 1/2 lengths ahead of Oxford, securing Cambridge's third consecutive victory. The race was particularly notable for the "unorthodox" steering of the Oxford cox Ashton Calvert.

In the reserve race, Goldie beat Isis, and in the Women's Boat Race, Cambridge were victorious.

== Background ==
The Boat Race is a side-by-side rowing competition between the boat clubs of University of Oxford (sometimes referred to as the "Dark Blues") and the University of Cambridge (sometimes referred to as the "Light Blues"). The race was first held in 1829, and since 1845 has taken place on the 4.2-mile (6.8 km) Championship Course on the River Thames in southwest London. The rivalry is a major point of honour between the two universities, as of 2014 it is followed throughout the United Kingdom and broadcast worldwide. Cambridge went into the race as reigning champions, having beaten Oxford by four lengths in the previous year's race, and held the overall lead, with 63 victories to Oxford's 51 (excluding the "dead heat" of 1877).

The first Women's Boat Race took place in 1927, but did not become an annual fixture until the 1960s. Up until 2014, the contest was conducted as part of the Henley Boat Races, but as of the 2015 race, it is held on the River Thames, on the same day as the men's main and reserve races. The reserve race, contested between Oxford's Isis boat and Cambridge's Goldie boat has been held since 1965. It usually takes place on the Tideway, prior to the main Boat Race.

The race was umpired by the former Cambridge University Boat Club president and rower Alan Burrough who took part in Cambridge's two losses in the 1937 and 1938 races and their victory in the 1939 race. Burrough had also umpired the 1966 race. Oxford were coached by their former boat club president Iain Elliott who rowed for the Dark Blues in the 1960 and 1961 races, and the Olympic rower Hugh "Jumbo" Edwards who had represented Oxford in the 1926 race. Lou Barry coached the Cambridge crew. Czechoslovak international rower Bob Janoušek assessed both crews as "extremely fit" but "far from expert in rowing".

== Crews ==
The Cambridge crew weighed an average of 13 st 9.25 lb (86.5 kg), 1.25 pounds (0.6 kg) per rower more than their opponents. The Light Blues featured just one former Blue in president David Cruttendon. However the Cambridge boat also included five members of the successful 1969 Goldie crew. Oxford saw the return of five former Blues, including the boat club president, Ashton Calvert, who coxed the boat.

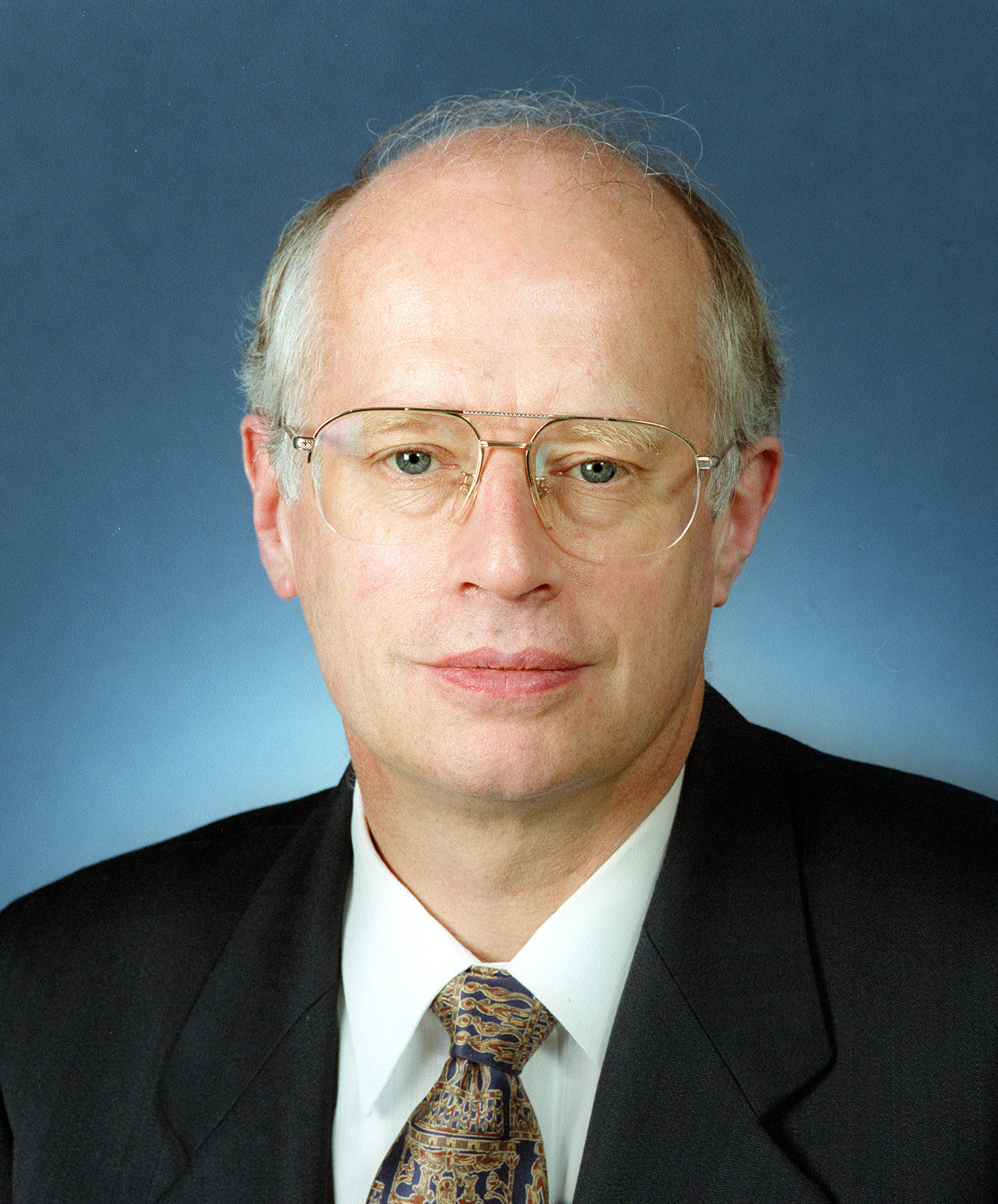
The Australian Ashton Calvert (pictured in 1998) coxed Oxford's crew for the second year in a row.

Seat	Oxford			Cambridge		
Seat	Name	College	Weight	Name	College	Weight
Bow	R. J. D. Gee	St John's	13 st 8 lb	J. F. S. Hervey-Bathurst	1st & 3rd Trinity	13 st 1.5 lb
2	J. K. G. Dart	Christ Church	12 st 10 lb	C. L. Baillieu	Jesus	13 st 5 lb
3	D. M. Higgs ‡	Balliol	13 st 9 lb	A. C. Buckmaster	Clare	13 st 8 lb
4	S. E. Wilmer	Christ Church	13 st 11 lb	C. J. Rogridgues	Jesus	13 st 2 lb
5	F. J. L. Dale	Keble	13 st 11 lb	C. J. Dalley	Queens'	14 st 5.5 lb
6	A. J. Hall	Keble	15 st 7 lb	D. L. Cruttenden (P)	St Catharine's	16 st 0 lb
7	N. D. C. Tee	Balliol	12 st 4 lb	C. M. Lowe	Fitzwilliam	13 st 7 lb
Stroke	W. R. C. Lonsdale	Keble	13 st 10 lb	S. N. S. Robertson	Fitzwilliam	12 st 3.5 lb
Cox	A. T. Calvert (P)	New College	8 st 12 lb	N. G. Hughes	Queens'	8 st 9 lb
Source: (P) – Boat club president ‡ Higgs replaced Robin Parish six days before the race.

== Race ==
The Championship Course along which the Boat Race is contested

Cambridge won the toss and elected to start from the Surrey station, from which every crew had won since the 1961 race. The race commenced five minutes later than the scheduled 4.35 p.m. start time, with Oxford delaying their arrival at the stakeboat. Cambridge made the better start and took an early lead. The Light Blues were half-a-length up within a minute, and had doubled that by the time they passed Beverley Brook. Oxford's stroke Lonsdale increased their rating in an attempt to stay with Cambridge around the long Surrey bend and temporarily succeeded. Still a length up at Harrods Furniture Depository, the Cambridge cox steered wide and Oxford began to close the gap. At Hammersmith Bridge, Oxford were no more than a length behind, and "unorthodox tactics" employed by Ashton Calvert, the cox, ensured an "exciting tactical battle" followed. Calvert steered the Dark Blue boat inside the Cambridge line and "made for the Surrey shore" in a manoeuvre which Donald Legget, writing in The Observer described as "the most extraordinary sight I have ever witnessed while rowing or coaching". Ignoring the umpire's warnings, Calvert continued on this path for two minutes before returning to the Middlesex side of the river. Despite remaining stroke for stroke, at Chiswick Eyot Cambridge pushed away and held a lead of nine seconds by Chiswick Steps. The lead had increased by two seconds at Barnes Bridge and Cambridge passed the finishing post eleven seconds ahead. Cambridge won by 3 1/2 lengths in a time of 20 minutes 22 seconds.

In the reserve race, Cambridge's Goldie beat Oxford's Isis by fourteen lengths, a record distance, in their fourth consecutive victory. In the 25th running of the Women's Boat Race, Cambridge triumphed, their eighth consecutive victory.

== Reaction ==
Calvert stated after the race: "I could see it was murder in those waves ... I decided to try to panic Cambridge by close contact steering, breaking their rhythm and attacking when the stations levelled out beyond Chiswick Steps." Opinion was divided on Calvert's tactics: The Observer's Legget claimed that Calvert "adopted quite the wrong tactics", while Jim Railton of The Times suggested "Calvert's move may well prove to be the future tactics of other crews behind but in contact at Hammersmith Bridge on the Middlesex station in similar conditions." He went on to say "Calvert's tactics nearly paid off and in the circumstances I consider he was justified in his actions." John Rodda of The Guardian described Calvert's steering as "zig-zag" and while acknowledging the "bold imagination" involved, claimed the cox's manoeuvres were "futile".
