= The Boat Race 1939 =

91st Boat Race
- Date: 1 April 1939
- Winner: Cambridge
- Margin of victory: 4 lengths
- Winning time: 19 minutes 3 seconds
- Overall record (Cambridge–Oxford): 48–42
- Umpire: William Rathbone (Oxford)

Other races
- Women's winner: Oxford

The 91st Boat Race took place on 1 April 1939. Held annually, the Boat Race is a side-by-side rowing race between crews from the Universities of Oxford and Cambridge along the River Thames. In a race umpired by the former Oxford rower William Rathbone, Cambridge won by four lengths in a time of 19 minutes 3 seconds. The victory took the overall record in the event to 48–42 in Cambridge's favour. It would be the last race for seven years as following the outbreak of the Second World War.

== Background ==
The Boat Race is a side-by-side rowing competition between the University of Oxford (sometimes referred to as the "Dark Blues") and the University of Cambridge (sometimes referred to as the "Light Blues"). The race was first held in 1829, and since 1845 has taken place on the 4.2-mile (6.8 km) Championship Course on the River Thames in southwest London. The rivalry is a major point of honour between the two universities; it is followed throughout the United Kingdom and, as of 2014, broadcast worldwide. Oxford went into the race as reigning champions, having won the 1938 race by two lengths, with Cambridge leading overall with 47 victories to Oxford's 42 (excluding the "dead heat" of 1877).

Cambridge were coached by H. E. Boardman, J. N. Duckworth (three-time Blue between 1934 and 1936) and Derek Mays-Smith. Oxford's coaches were John Cherry (who rowed for the Dark Blues in the 1936, 1937 and 1938 races), Guy Oliver Nickalls (who had rowed three times between 1921 and 1923) and J. H. Philips. The race was umpired by the former Oxford rower and coach William Rathbone who had represented the Dark Blues in the 1926 and 1927 races and coached them in the 1936 and 1937 races.

During the build-up to the race at Putney, Oxford's stroke R. M. A. Bourne suffered a serious hand injury; he was temporarily replaced by J. R. Bingham, but Bourne failed to regain his form after returning and so was dropped in favour of his stand-in. Oxford were described by the rowing correspondent for The Manchester Guardian as having "a powerful, orthodox crew without a weak man in the boat" while he suggested that "Cambridge are not orthodox, and they have not quite the same uniformity of style". The rowing correspondent for The Times agreed, stating that "since 1936 Cambridge rowing has certainly deteriorated, and they have produced this year as heterogeneous a crew as has ever been seen in the race." The Dark Blues were considered by most to be favourites to win the race. Both crews raced in boats built by George Sims Boatbuilding Company of Hammersmith.

== Crews ==
The Oxford crew weighed an average of 12 st 12.5 lb (81.7 kg), 2.5 pounds (1.1 kg) per rower more than their opponents. The Cambridge crew saw three former Blues return, including Alan Burrough who was making his third consecutive appearance. Oxford's crew included four rowers with Boat Race experience, including their number four, R. R. Stewart who was also taking part in his third consecutive race. Three of the individuals participating in the race were registered as non-British: Oxford's H. P. V. Massey was Canadian, while Cambridge's crew included American number five H. Parker and Australian number six J. Turnbull. C. B. (Bevis) Sanford, the stroke for Cambridge, went on to be President of Cambridge University Boat Club and row in the unofficial 1940 boat race at Henley; he died on 4 April 2019 at the age of 101.

Seat	Oxford			Cambridge		
Seat	Name	College	Weight	Name	College	Weight
Bow	G. Huse	Oriel	12 st 7 lb	B. T. Coulton	Jesus	10 st 13 lb
2	J. L. Garton (P)	Magdalen	11 st 7 lb	A. M. Turner	Corpus Christi College	12 st 3 lb
3	A. G. Slemeck	St Edmund Hall	13 st 1 lb	A. Burrough (P)	Jesus	12 st 7 lb
4	R. R. Stewart	Magdalen	13 st 4 lb	J. L. L. Savil	Jesus	13 st 2 lb
5	R. D. Burnell	Magdalen	14 st 1.5 lb	H. Parker	Trinity Hall	12 st 13 lb
6	F. A. L. Waldron	Trinity	14 st 4 lb	J. Turnbull	Clare	13 st 12 lb
7	H. A. W. Forbes	Magdalen	13 st 5 lb	M. Buxton	3rd Trinity	12 st 13 lb
Stroke	J. R. Bingham	Pembroke	11 st 2 lb	C. B. Sanford	Trinity Hall	12 st 1 lb
Cox	H. P. V. Massey	Balliol	5 st 2 lb	H. T. Smith	Magdalene	8 st 11 lb
Source: (P) – boat club president

== Race ==
The Championship Course along which the Boat Race is contested

Cambridge won the toss and elected to start from the Surrey station, handing the Middlesex side of the river to Oxford. Umpire Rathbone started the race at 11:01 a.m. after Oxford had kept Cambridge waiting at the stakeboat for five minutes. Oxford made the quicker start and were a quarter of a length ahead within fifteen seconds. However, Cambridge's longer strokes saw them soon pick up pace and within a minute they were a third of a length ahead of the Dark Blues. Out-rating their opponents by four strokes per minute, Cambridge were half a length ahead by Craven Steps and two lengths up by the Mile Post. Despite their lead, the Light Blues were "rather ragged and badly together" while Oxford "were rowing perfectly steadily." The Dark Blue cox Massey steered across to the Surrey station in an attempt to gain more advantage from the tide, but Cambridge began to pull away again at Harrods Furniture Depository and led by two and a half lengths as they passed below Hammersmith Bridge.

The Light Blues reduced their stroke rate but continued to extend their lead, passing Chiswick Steps with a 12-second advantage which they were held to until they passed below Barnes Bridge. C. B. Sanford, the Cambridge stroke, called for a push and increased the rate by four strokes a minute to pull even further ahead, even though Oxford had made a push of their own. Cambridge won by four lengths in a time of 19 minutes 3 seconds. It was their first victory since the 1936 race, and the fastest winning time and largest winning margin since the 1934 race. The victory took the overall record in the event to 47–42 in Cambridge's favour. The rowing correspondent of The Manchester Guardian was critical of Oxford's failure to respond to Cambridge's early pressure: "it was incumbent on them to fight like tigers, they settled down to a dignified and, as it were, middle-aged stride". The Observer's rowing correspondent agreed: "It could hardly be described as a 'race' for Oxford made no effort to 'race' and the further they went the more they fell behind."

It was the last race until 1946, as a result of the outbreak of the Second World War, and first time since 1920 that there was a break in the annual tradition.
