= The Boat Race 1955 =

101st Boat Race
- Date: 26 March 1955
- Winner: Cambridge
- Margin of victory: 16 lengths
- Winning time: 19 minutes 10 seconds
- Overall record (Cambridge–Oxford): 55–45
- Umpire: Gerald Ellison (Oxford)

The 101st Boat Race took place on 26 March 1955. Held annually, the Boat Race is a side-by-side rowing race between crews from the Universities of Oxford and Cambridge along the River Thames. The race, in which the Cambridge crew was substantially heavier than their opponents and where there were more non-British participants than ever before, was umpired by former Oxford rower Gerald Ellison. Cambridge won by sixteen lengths, the second largest margin of victory in the history of the Boat Race, in a time of 19 minutes 10 seconds. It was their second win in three years and took the overall record in the event to 55–45 in their favour.

== Background ==
The Boat Race is a side-by-side rowing competition between the University of Oxford (sometimes referred to as the "Dark Blues") and the University of Cambridge (sometimes referred to as the "Light Blues"). First held in 1829, the race takes place on the 4.2-mile (6.8 km) Championship Course on the River Thames in southwest London. The rivalry is a major point of honour between the two universities; it is followed throughout the United Kingdom and, as of 2014, broadcast worldwide. Oxford went into the race as reigning champions, having won the 1954 race by 4 1/2 lengths, while Cambridge led overall with 54 victories to Oxford's 45 (excluding the "dead heat" of 1877).

Cambridge were coached by J. R. F. Best, G. Bogland-Wood, Thom Langton (who had rowed in the 1937 and 1938 races), Derek Mays-Smith and James Owen. Oxford's coaches were Christopher Davidge (who rowed in the 1949, 1951 and 1952 races and was non-rowing president for the 1951 race), Hugh "Jumbo" Edwards (a Blue in 1926 and 1930), W. J. Llewellyn-Jones and A. D. Rowe (who had represented Oxford in the 1948 and 1949 races). The race was umpired by former Oxford rower Gerald Ellison, the Bishop of Willesden, who had rowed for Oxford in the 1932 and 1933 races.

Before the race, the rowing correspondent for The Times suggested "it must be rare for two Boat Race crews to be as dissimilar as are the Oxford and Cambridge crews" who were to race against one another. Oxford were the lighter crew yet demonstrated uniformity and excellent watermanship. Cambridge's style was diverse but demonstrated a "tremendous zest for hard work and hard rowing."

== Crews ==
The Cambridge crew weighed an average of 13 st 2.5 lb (83.5 kg), 11 pounds (5.0 kg) per rower more than their opponents. Six of the Oxford crew had previous Boat Race experience, including their bow James A. Gobbo. Cambridge saw two rowers return, in bow D. K. Hill and number four K. A. Masser. The race saw more non-British participants than ever before: Oxford's crew included four Australians in Gobbo, E. V. Vine, J. G. McLeod and Edward Pain, while Cambridge's had two Harvard University rowers in P. du Bois and Robert Monks. Oxford's Pain was an Olympic bronze medallist in the men's eight at the 1952 Summer Olympics.

Seat	Oxford			Cambridge		
Seat	Name	College	Weight	Name	College	Weight
Bow	J. A. Gobbo (P)	Magdalen	12 st 10 lb	D. K. Hill (P)	Jesus	12 st 4 lb
2	E. V. Vine	Brasenose	11 st 13 lb	P. du Bois	1st & 3rd Trinity	13 st 3 lb
3	J. M. Wilson	Trinity	12 st 9 lb	A. A. M. Mays-Smith	1st & 3rd Trinity	14 st 0 lb
4	D. P. Wells	Magdalen	12 st 2 lb	K. A. Masser	Trinity Hall	13 st 12 lb
5	R. D. T. Raikes	Merton	12 st 13 lb	S. G. D. Tozer	1st & 3rd Trinity	13 st 12 lb
6	J. G. McLeod	New College	12 st 10 lb	R. A. G. Monks	1st & 3rd Trinity	13 st 9.5 lb
7	E. O. G. Pain	Lincoln	12 st 0 lb	J. J. Vernon	Trinity Hall	12 st 4 lb
Stroke	G. Sorrell	Christ Church	11 st 12 lb	A. R. Muirhead	Lady Margaret Boat Club	12 st 2 lb
Cox	I. A. Watson	Keble	9 st 3 lb	G. T. Harris	Jesus	9 st 4 lb
Source: (P) – boat club president

== Race ==
The Championship Course along which the Boat Race is contested

Oxford won the toss and elected to start from the Surrey station, handing the Middlesex side of the river to Cambridge. The umpire Ellison started the race at 2:20 p.m. whereupon Oxford made the better start, rating 40 strokes per minute, and taking a slight lead. Maintaining the higher stroke rate, the Dark Blues passed Craven Steps with a canvas-length lead in a record time. Taking advantage of the bend in the river, Cambridge first drew level before holding a quarter-length lead by the time the crews passed the Mile Post. By Harrods Furniture Depository, the lead was just back to a canvas before a mistake in the steering from Oxford's cox, Watson, on the approach to Hammersmith Bridge saw Cambridge leading by a few feet. A spurt from Oxford's stroke, G. Sorrell went unanswered by his crew, and in response, the Light Blue stroke pushed on, taking the Cambridge boat away. By Chiswick Eyot, the Light Blues held a three-length lead, which they extended to over five lengths by Chiswick Steps.

Rough water in Corney Reach meant both crews had reduced to 28 strokes per minute, but Oxford were tiring: their number six McLeod "stopped rowing...he kept some sort of time, but barely dipping his blade into the water". The rowing correspondent for The Manchester Guardian suggested that he had "got his oar buried, was pounded in the stomach by its handle and virtually stopped rowing". Cambridge passed below Barnes Bridge thirty seconds ahead and had reduced their rating to 26 strokes per minute, 6 fewer than Oxford, who continued to struggle. Cambridge won by sixteen lengths, the second-largest margin of victory in the history of the Boat Race, surpassed only by their twenty-length win in the 1900 race.. The winning time was 19 minutes 10 seconds. It was their second win in three years and took the overall record in the event to 55–45 in their favour.
