= The Boat Race 1980 =

126th Boat Race
- Date: 5 April 1980
- Winner: Oxford
- Margin of victory: Canvas
- Winning time: 19 minutes 20 seconds
- Overall record (Cambridge–Oxford): 68–57
- Umpire: Alan Burrough

Other races
- Reserve winner: Isis
- Women's winner: Oxford

The 126th Boat Race took place on 5 April 1980. Held annually, the Boat Race is a side-by-side rowing race between crews from the Universities of Oxford and Cambridge along the River Thames. It was won by Oxford in the closest finish for a century, despite one of its oarsmen collapsing before the end of the race.

In the reserve race, Isis beat Goldie by five lengths, and in the Women's Boat Race, Oxford were victorious.

== Background ==
The Boat Race is a side-by-side rowing competition between the University of Oxford (sometimes referred to as the "Dark Blues") and the University of Cambridge (sometimes referred to as the "Light Blues"). First held in 1829, the race takes place on the 4.2 miles (6.8 km) Championship Course on the River Thames in southwest London. The rivalry is a major point of honour between the two universities and followed throughout the United Kingdom and broadcast worldwide. Oxford went into the race as reigning champions, having beaten Cambridge by 3 1/2 lengths in the previous year's race. However Cambridge held the overall lead, with 68 victories to Oxford's 56 (excluding the "dead heat" of 1877). The race was sponsored for the fourth time by Ladbrokes. It was the last race to be commentated on BBC Radio by John Snagge.

The first Women's Boat Race took place in 1927, but did not become an annual fixture until the 1960s. Until 2014, the contest was conducted as part of the Henley Boat Races, but as of the 2015 race, it is held on the River Thames, on the same day as the men's main and reserve races. The reserve race, contested between Oxford's Isis boat and Cambridge's Goldie boat has been held since 1965. It usually takes place on the Tideway, prior to the main Boat Race.

Cambridge coach Graeme Hall was stroke for the Light Blues in the 1968 race, racing against Oxford coach Daniel Topolski who was bowman for the Dark Blues that year. Cambridge Boat Club president John Woodhouse noted: "We have cut down the number of formal dinners with old Blues and old coaches, and we have tried to keep the evenings quiet."

== Crews ==
The Oxford crew featured three Old Blues, Chris Mahoney, Mike Diserens, and Boris Rankov, who was rowing in his third University Boat Race. In J.S. Palmer and A.G. Phillips, Cambridge's crew contained two Blues returning from the previous year's race. Hugh Laurie was following the tradition of his father, former Light Blue president and Olympic gold medallist Ran, who had won the Boat Race in 1934, 1935 and 1936.

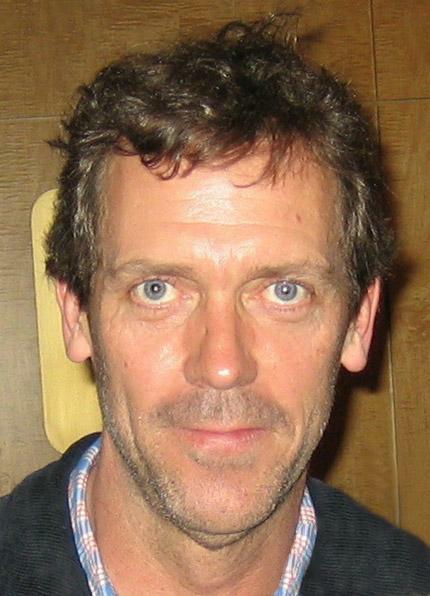
Hugh Laurie rowed for Cambridge in 1980.

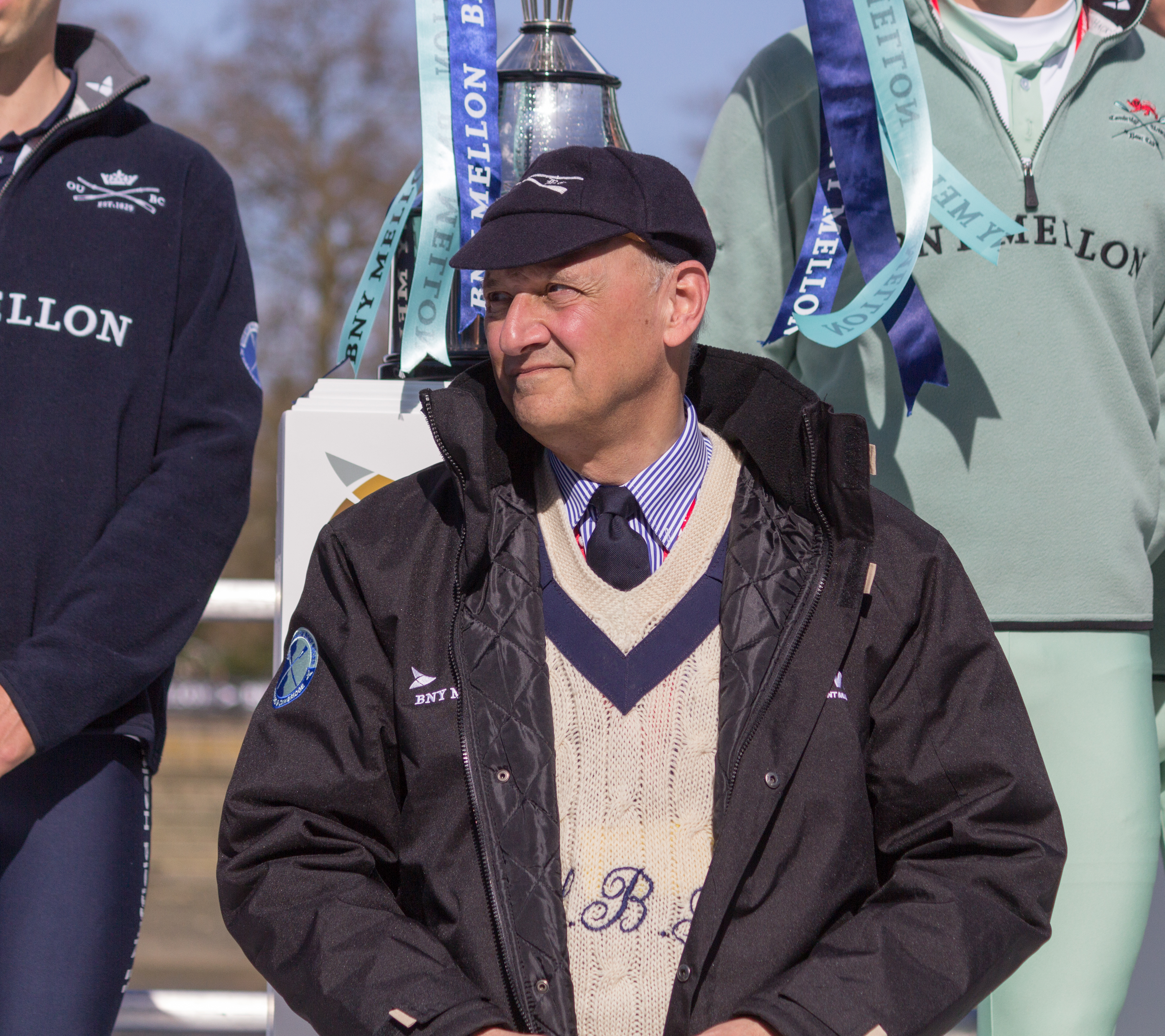
Boris Rankov (pictured in 2015) made the third of his six appearances for Oxford.

Seat	Oxford			Cambridge		
Seat	Name	College	Weight	Name	College	Weight
Bow	S. R. W. Francis	Corpus Christi	13 st 12 lb	L. W. J. Baart	Gonville and Caius	13 st 4 lb
2	N. A. Conington	Oriel	13 st 0 lb	M. F. Panter	Lady Margaret Boat Club	14 st 1 lb
3	M. D. Andrews	Magdalen	14 st 0.5 lb	T. W. Whitney	Jesus	13 st 7 lb
4	J. L. Bland	Merton	13 st 11 lb	J. H. C. Laurie	Selwyn	13 st 12 lb
5	N. B. Rankov (P)	Corpus Christi	14 st 3 lb	A. G. Phillips	Jesus	13 st 5.5 lb
6	C. J. Mahoney	Oriel	13 st 6 lb	J. W. Woodhouse (P)	Selwyn	13 st 9 lb
7	T. C. M Barry	Oriel	13 st 4.5 lb	J. S. Palmer	Pembroke	14 st 8 lb
Stroke	M. J. Diserens	Keble	12 st 13 lb	A. D. Dalrymple	Downing	12 st 8 lb
Cox	J. S Mead	St Edmund Hall	8 st 3.5 lb	C. J. Wigglesworth	Jesus	7 st 13.5 lb
Source: (P) – Boat club president

== Race ==
The Championship Course along which the Boat Race is contested

Oxford won the toss and elected to start on the Surrey station. The race started at 4.45 pm. Following a clash soon after the start, and another at Harrods, the crews were level. Despite Oxford's number seven, Thomas Barry, losing part of his blade, his crew established a lead and defended it against a higher rating Cambridge. Umpire Alan Burrough allowed the race to continue, despite the clash and close steering. By Barnes Bridge, Oxford's bowman, Steve Francis, was exhausted and "had more or less stopped rowing". Cambridge's push continued but Oxford passed the finishing post with a canvas' advantage, the closest finish of the century. Francis was treated for exhaustion, but was later diagnosed with hepatitis.

In the reserve race, Isis beat Goldie by five lengths, their first victory in four years. In the 35th running of the Women's Boat Race, Oxford triumphed, only their second victory in twenty years.

== Reaction ==
It was the first time Oxford had won five consecutive races since 1913 and was the "closest finish since at least the turn of the century." Laurie recalls his attempts to emulate his father's rowing career as "feeble". Rankov, rowing in the third of his six Boat Races, recalls the race as one of his most memorable. He continued: "It was unbelievable. They kept coming at us and every time we tried to get away nothing happened." Woodhouse lamented: "All I can say is that we shouldn't have lost by so much."

BBC reporter Snagge, commentating on his last Boat Race, remarked: "An absolutely cracking race ... a grand battle."
