= Burnford =

Burnford is a surname. Notable people with the surname include:

- David Burnford (1915–1984), British doctor and rower
- Sheila Burnford (1918–1984), Scottish writer
