= The Boat Race 1935 =

87th Boat Race
- Date: 6 April 1935
- Winner: Cambridge
- Margin of victory: 4 1/2 lengths
- Winning time: 19 minutes 48 seconds
- Overall record (Cambridge–Oxford): 46–40
- Umpire: Robert Bourne (Oxford)

Other races
- Women's winner: Oxford

The 87th Boat Race took place on 6 April 1935. Held annually, the Boat Race is a side-by-side rowing race between crews from the Universities of Oxford and Cambridge along the River Thames. Umpired by former Oxford rower Robert Bourne, Cambridge won by four and a half lengths in a time of 19 minutes 48 seconds. The record twelfth consecutive victory took the overall record in the event to 46–40 in Cambridge's favour.

== Background ==
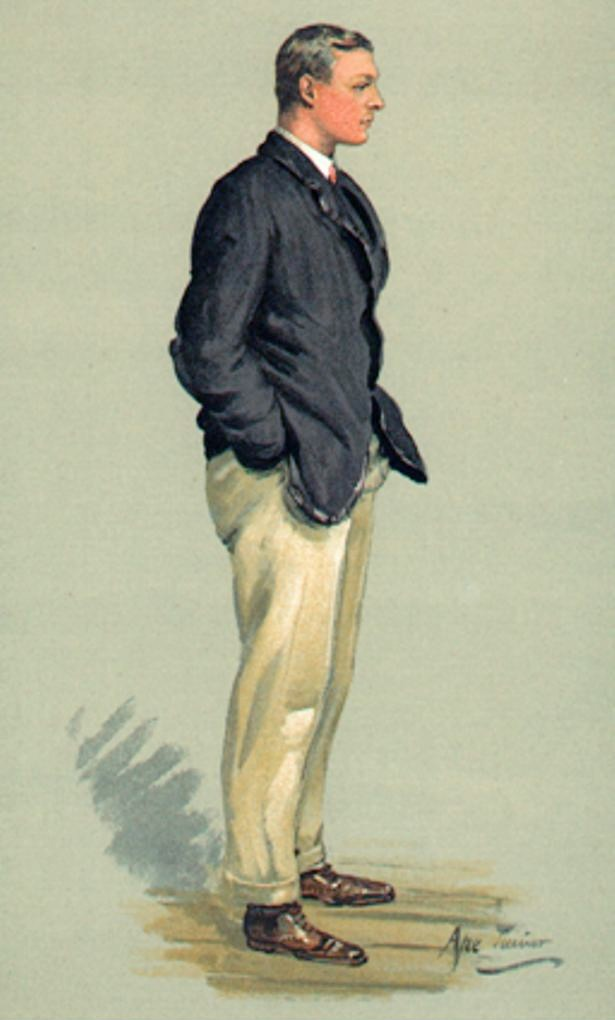
Vanity Fair caricature of Robert Bourne who umpired the race in 1935.

The Boat Race is a side-by-side rowing competition between the University of Oxford (sometimes referred to as the "Dark Blues") and the University of Cambridge (sometimes referred to as the "Light Blues"). The race was first held in 1829, and since 1845 has taken place on the 4.2-mile (6.8 km) Championship Course on the River Thames in southwest London. The rivalry is a major point of honour between the two universities; it is followed throughout the United Kingdom and, as of 2014, broadcast worldwide. Cambridge went into the race as reigning champions, having won the 1934 race by four and a quarter lengths, and led overall with 45 victories to Oxford's 40 (excluding the "dead heat" of 1877).

Cambridge's coaches were D. H. E. McCowen (who had rowed in the 1932 race) and, according to the rowing correspondent for The Times, "two eminent Metropolitan coaches" in R. A. Nisbet and C. H. Rew. Oxford were coached by Francis Escombe and Peter Haig-Thomas, both of whom previously coached the Light Blues, and former Light Blue rower Kenneth Payne (who rowed for Cambridge in the 1932 and 1934 races). The race was umpired by former Oxford rower and boat club president Robert Bourne who had stroked the Dark Blues to four consecutive victories between 1909 and 1912, while the finishing judge was C. W. Kent. Both boats were made by Sims and both crews used Ayling's oars.

The rowing correspondent for The Times noted that "neither crew is exceptionally fast" and suggested that Oxford's heavier crew would out-perform Cambridge, who he claimed "will be seen at their best in calm conditions". As a result of Oxford's practice rows during the period running up to the race, former Dark Blue rower E. P. Evans, writing in The Manchester Guardian, stated "Cambridge are now at the zenith of their power and are not likely to improve, whilst Oxford are still in the stages of reaching perfection".

== Crews ==
The Oxford crew weighed an average of 12 st 13 lb (81.9 kg), 4.375 pounds (2.0 kg) per rower more than their opponents. Cambridge saw four participants with Boat Race experience return to the crew, including cox Noel Duckworth. The Light Blue crew also included a pair of brothers in Annesely and Desmond Kingsford. Oxford's crew also contained four former Blues, including P. R. S. Bankes and John Couchman, both of whom were rowing in their third consecutive race. All of the race participants were registered as British.

Seat	Cambridge			Oxford		
Seat	Name	College	Weight	Name	College	Weight
Bow	T. R. M. Bristow	Pembroke	12 st 4 lb	R. Hope	New College	12 st 2 lb
2	E. A. Szilagyi	Jesus	12 st 3 lb	D. M. de R. Winser	Corpus Christi	11 st 9.5 lb
3	A. D. Kingsford	Pembroke	12 st 4 lb	E. E. D. Tomlin	University	12 st 5 lb
4	J. H. C. Powell	3rd Trinity	12 st 0 lb	P. R. S. Bankes	Christ Church	14 st 3 lb
5	D. G. Kingsford	Pembroke	12 st 0 lb	D. R. B. Mynors	New College	13 st 0 lb
6	M. P. Lonnon	3rd Trinity	12 st 8 lb	J. M. Couchman	Christ Church	12 st 13.5 lb
7	J. H. T. Wilson	Pembroke	12 st 13 lb	B. J. Sciortino	University	12 st 10 lb
Stroke	W. G. R. M. Laurie	Selwyn	13 st 7 lb	A. V. Suitcliffe	Trinity	14 st 5 lb
Cox	J. N. Duckworth	Jesus	7 st 13 lb	C. G. F. Bryan	Worcester	7 st 13 lb
Source: (P) – boat club president

== Race ==
The Championship Course along which the Boat Race is contested

Cambridge won the toss and elected to start from the Surrey station, handing the Middlesex side of the river to Oxford. The umpire Bourne started the race at 2:48 p.m. in strong and gusty wind, and rough water. The Light Blues made the quicker start, out-rating Oxford by three strokes within the first minute, and led by half a length. Thirty seconds later, Cambridge were clear and were further ahead by Craven Steps. By the end of the Fulham Wall, Duckworth steered directly towards the Surrey shore in an attempt to find shelter from the conditions. A spurt from the Dark Blues made no difference to the gap and Cambridge passed the Mile Post almost two lengths ahead. Another spurt from Oxford at Harrods Furniture Depository once again made no impact on the deficit and Cambridge passed below Hammersmith Bridge with a lead of three lengths.

Intelligent steering from C. G. F. Bryan, the Oxford cox, saw the Dark Blues "hugging the Surrey bank" to reduce the Cambridge lead to about a length by Chiswick Eyot. It was short-lived however, as Bryan steered back over towards the Middlesex side of the river, losing his crew a length in doing so and moving into rougher water, and by Chiswick Steps, the Light Blues were four and a half lengths ahead. Cambridge's stroke Ran Laurie called for a spurt and by the time they passed under Barnes Bridge they were five lengths ahead. They crossed to the Middlesex side of the river before passing the finishing post with a lead of four and a half lengths in a time of 19 minutes 48 seconds. It was a record twelfth victory for the Light Blues and took the overall record in the event to 46–40 in their favour. Former Oxford rower E. P. Evans, writing in The Manchester Guardian, stated that Cambridge "won in the easiest manner possible, having led from start to finish" and described the race as a "fiasco". The rowing correspondent for The Times suggested that "never was it so obvious after the first few strokes that there was only one crew in the race ... Oxford's form was too bad to be true."
