= Noel Duckworth =

British rower

John Noel Duckworth (25 December 1912 – 24 November 1980), MA, TD, was a rower and Anglican priest, Canon of Accra and the first Chaplain of Churchill College.

== Biography ==
Duckworth was born on Christmas Day (hence Noel) at Goole, the son of the Reverend James Duckworth and his wife Nancy Sumner. He was educated at Lincoln School before he went up to Jesus College, Cambridge. At Cambridge University he coxed the winning Cambridge crews in the 1934, 1935 and 1936 Boat Races. In 1936 he coxed the Great Britain eight which came fourth at the 1936 Summer Olympics in Berlin.

He was ordained in 1936 and appointed a chaplain to the forces in August 1939. During the Second World War he served as chaplain to the 2nd Battalion, Cambridgeshire Regiment, and was sent out to Malaya in 1941. Duckworth was captured by the Japanese at Senggarang when he elected to remain with a group of wounded soldiers. He spent time in Pudu Gaol, in Changi Prison, a prisoner-of-war camp where he acted as chaplain. His work in the camp was documented in Russell Braddon's The Naked Island.

Immediately after the war he was appointed Chaplain of St John's College, Cambridge. In 1948 he took a post as Chaplain and Dean of the then newly created University of Ghana. Here, apart from his university work he became a canon in Accra cathedral. He returned to England in 1957 to become Chaplain at Pocklington School in Yorkshire.

Duckworth joined the newly founded Churchill College in 1961, where he helped found both the Chapel at Churchill College and Churchill College Boat Club. He was also a staunch defender of women's rowing, acting as coach to the Cambridge University Women's Boat Club (whom he referred to as the "Perspiring Persephones" and the "Sweaty Bettys") and helping to organise their defence campaign when the President of the Cambridge University Boat Club attempted in 1964 to have them banned from the Bumps races, an attempt which ultimately failed. He retired in 1973.

He was the subject of This Is Your Life on 12 January 1959 when, taken to the BBC Television Theatre by his friend the rowing commentator John Snagge, he was surprised by Eamonn Andrews. He was also the subject of Desert Island Discs on 9 October 1961. Churchill College published a biography, An Extraordinary Life, in 2012; the book was written by Michael Smyth, and has an introduction by John Gladwin.

== See also ==
- List of Cambridge University Boat Race crews
