= The Boat Race 1924 =

76th Boat Race
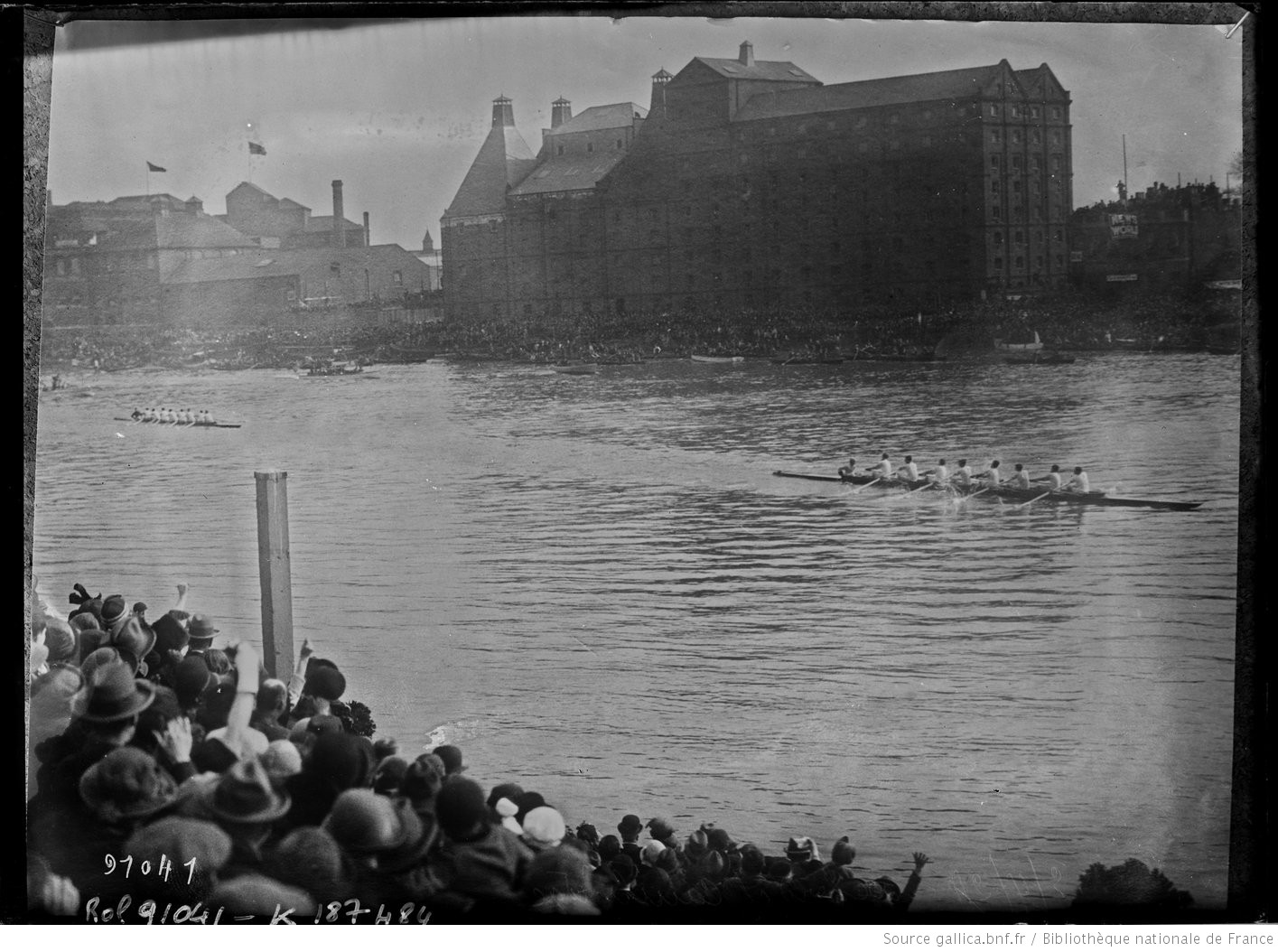
- Date: 5 April 1924
- Winner: Cambridge
- Margin of victory: 4 1/2 lengths
- Winning time: 18 minutes 41 seconds
- Overall record (Cambridge–Oxford): 35–40
- Umpire: Frederick I. Pitman (Cambridge)

The 76th Boat Race took place on 5 April 1924. Held annually, the Boat Race is a side-by-side rowing race between crews from the Universities of Oxford and Cambridge along the River Thames. Oxford were reigning champions, having won the previous year's race, and their crew was significantly heavier than their opponents for this year's race. Umpired by former rower Frederick I. Pitman, Cambridge won by 4 1/2 lengths in a time of 18 minutes 41 seconds, the fastest time since 1911. The victory took the overall record in the event to 40–35 in Oxford's favour.

== Background ==
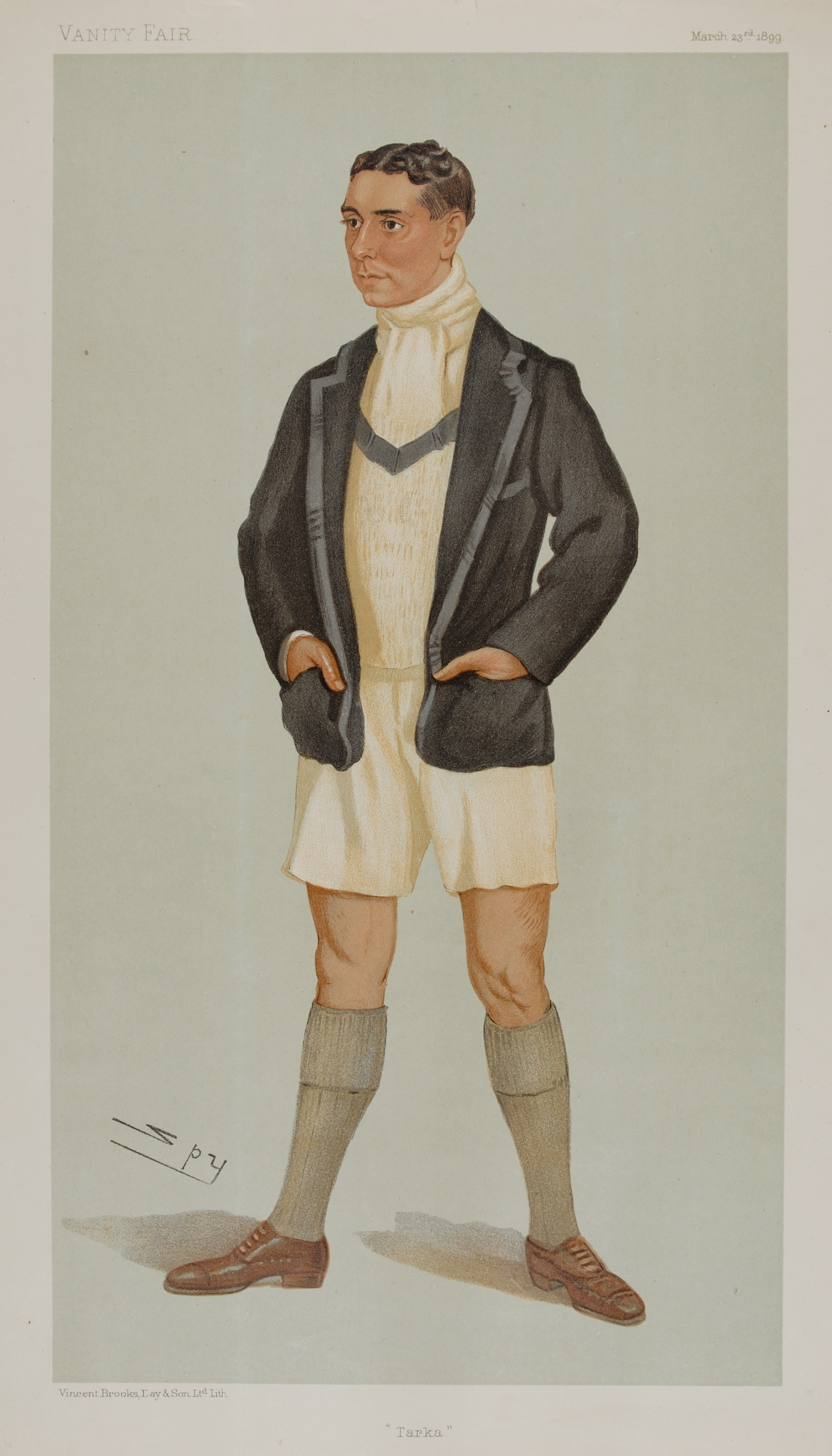
Harcourt Gilbey Gold coached the Oxford crew.

The Boat Race is a side-by-side rowing competition between the University of Oxford (sometimes referred to as the "Dark Blues") and the University of Cambridge (sometimes referred to as the "Light Blues"). The race was first held in 1829, and since 1845 has taken place on the 4.2-mile (6.8 km) Championship Course on the River Thames in southwest London. The rivalry is a major point of honour between the two universities and followed throughout the United Kingdom and worldwide. Oxford went into the race as reigning champions, having won the 1923 race by three-quarters of a length, and led overall with 40 victories to Cambridge's 34 (excluding the "dead heat" of 1877).

Oxford were coached by G. C. Bourne who had rowed for the university in the 1882 and 1883 races, Harcourt Gilbey Gold (Dark Blue president for the 1900 race and four-time Blue) and E. D. Horsfall (who had rowed in the three races prior to the First World War). Cambridge's coaches were Francis Escombe, P. Haig-Thomas (four-time Blue who had rowed between 1902 and 1905) and David Alexander Wauchope (who had rowed in the 1895 race). For the sixteenth year the umpire was Old Etonian Frederick I. Pitman who rowed for Cambridge in the 1884, 1885 and 1886 races.

Cambridge had few former Blues to call upon and despite measles striking at least one of the crew down, their rowing style was described by author and former Oxford rower George Drinkwater as "harmoniously together". Conversely, Oxford's crew was experienced yet a "lack of uniformity" in early training evolved into a crew with "a turn of such extraordinary speed that being was as much as four to one on Oxford".

== Crews ==
R. E. Eason, seat 4 in the Oxford crew.

The Oxford crew weighed an average of 12 st 5.5 lb (78.5 kg), 5.875 pounds (2.7 kg) per rower more than their opponents. Cambridge saw a single rower return with Boat Race experience in their number six T. D. A. Collet. Conversely, Oxford's crew included six individuals who had represented the Dark Blues in the event, including bow P. C. Mallam who was making his fourth consecutive appearance. Oxford's American stroke W. P. Mellen was the only non-British participant registered in the event, having been educated at the Middlesex School in Concord, Massachusetts.

Seat	Oxford			Cambridge		
Seat	Name	College	Weight	Name	College	Weight
Bow	P. C. Mallam (P)	Queen's	11 st 11.5 lb	G. E. G. Goddard	Jesus	11 st 9.5 lb
2	P. R. Wace	Brasenose	12 st 1.5 lb	J. S. Herbert	King's	11 st 9 lb
3	W. F. Godden	Trinity	12 st 12 lb	J. A. Macnabb	3rd Trinity	11 st 11.75 lb
4	R. E. Eason	All Souls	13 st 1.5 lb	G. L. Elliot-Smith	Lady Margaret	13 st 2 lb
5	G. J. Mower-White	Brasenose	13 st 9.5 lb	G. H. Ambler	Clare	12 st 2 lb
6	J. E. Pedder	Worcester	13 st 2 lb	T. D. A. Collet (P)	Pembroke	12 st 4 lb
7	G. E. G. Gadsden	Christ Church	10 st 10 lb	C. R. M. Eley	3rd Trinity	11 st 4 lb
Stroke	W. P. Mellen	Brasenose	10 st 10 lb	A. B. Stobart	Pembroke	11 st 10.5 lb
Cox	G. D. Clapperton	Magdalen	7 st 9.5 lb	J. A. Brown	Caius	7 st 7 lb
Source: (P) – boat club president

== Race ==
The Championship Course along which the Boat Race is contested

Cambridge won the toss and elected to start from the Surrey station, handing the Middlesex side of the river to Oxford. Umpire Pitman started the race in bright sunshine and a light breeze at 2:23 p.m. Oxford took a brief lead, out-rating their opponents significantly in the first minute, but by the time the crews passed the Mile Post, the Light Blues were nearly a quarter of a length ahead. As both boats passed under Hammersmith Bridge, Cambridge had extended their lead and were clear of Oxford, despite rowing two strokes per minute slower.

Even though the Dark Blues made a spurt, Cambridge pulled away and were three lengths ahead by Chiswick Steps. According to author and former Oxford rower George Drinkwater, "from here they had it all their own way to the finish". Cambridge passed the finishing post four and a half lengths ahead, in a time of 18 minutes 41 seconds, the fastest winning time since the 1911 race and the second fastest time in the history of the event. It was their fourth win in five years and took the overall record in the event to 40–35 in Oxford's favour.

On the evening of the race, there were exuberant celebrations by students in Leicester Square in Central London. Patrick Mallam, the President of the Oxford boat club and who had rowed bow for Oxford, was arrested following an incident with a member of staff of the Empire Theatre. He subsequently appeared at Bow Street Magistrates' Court, charged with being drunk and disorderly.
