= The Boat Race 1923 =

75th Boat Race
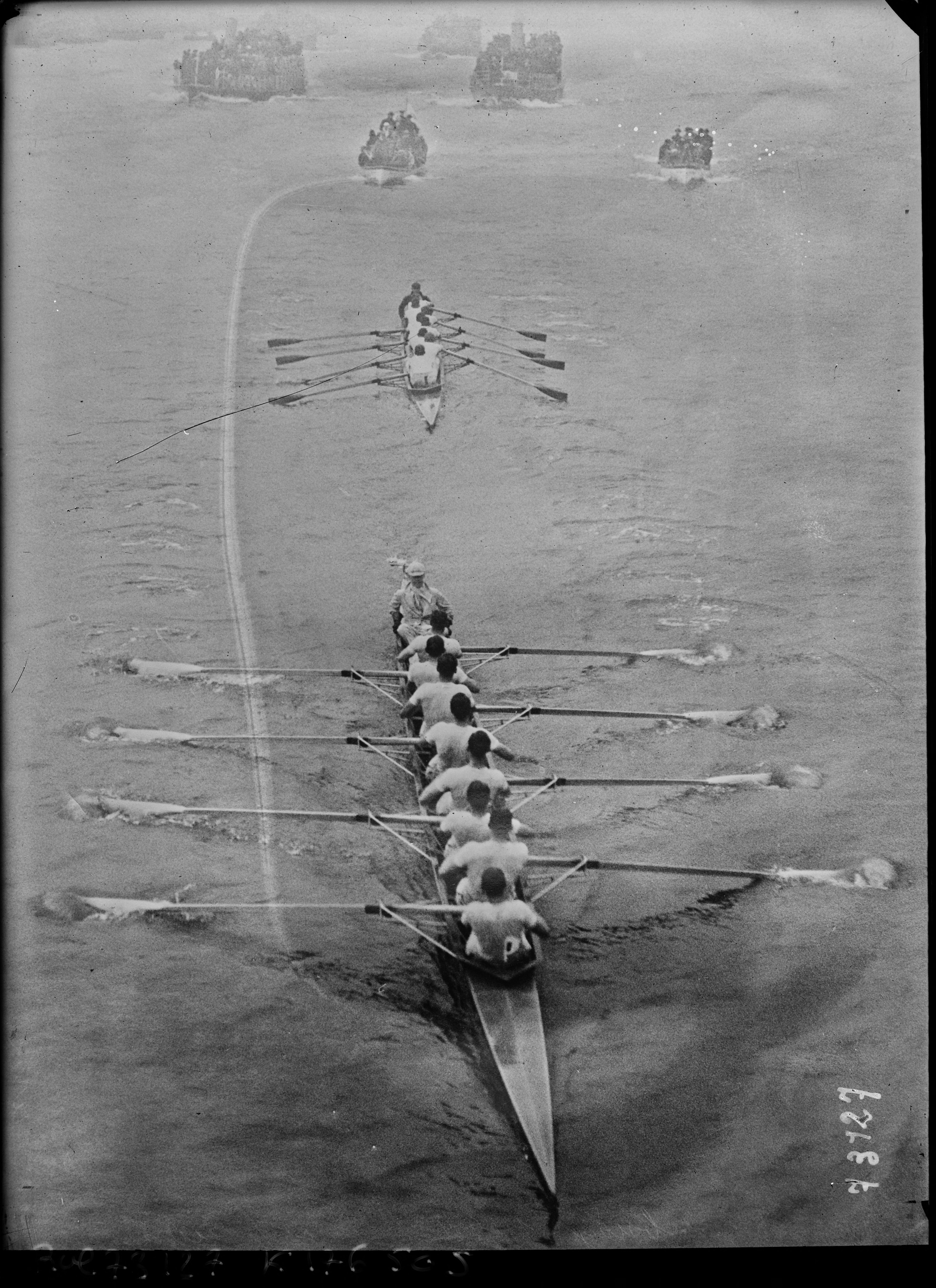
- Date: 24 March 1923
- Winner: Oxford
- Margin of victory: 3/4 length
- Winning time: 20 minutes 54 seconds
- Overall record (Cambridge–Oxford): 34–40
- Umpire: Frederick I. Pitman (Cambridge)

The 75th Boat Race took place on 24 March 1923. Held annually, the Boat Race is a side-by-side rowing race between crews from the Universities of Oxford and Cambridge along the River Thames. Cambridge's crew was marginally heavier than Oxford's, the latter included an Olympic silver medallist. Cambridge went into the race as reigning champions, having won the previous year's race. In this year's race, umpired by former rower Frederick I. Pitman, Oxford won by three-quarters of a length (the narrowest margin of victory since 1913) in a time of 20 minutes 54 seconds, securing their first win in five years. The victory took the overall record in the event to 40–34 in their favour.

== Background ==
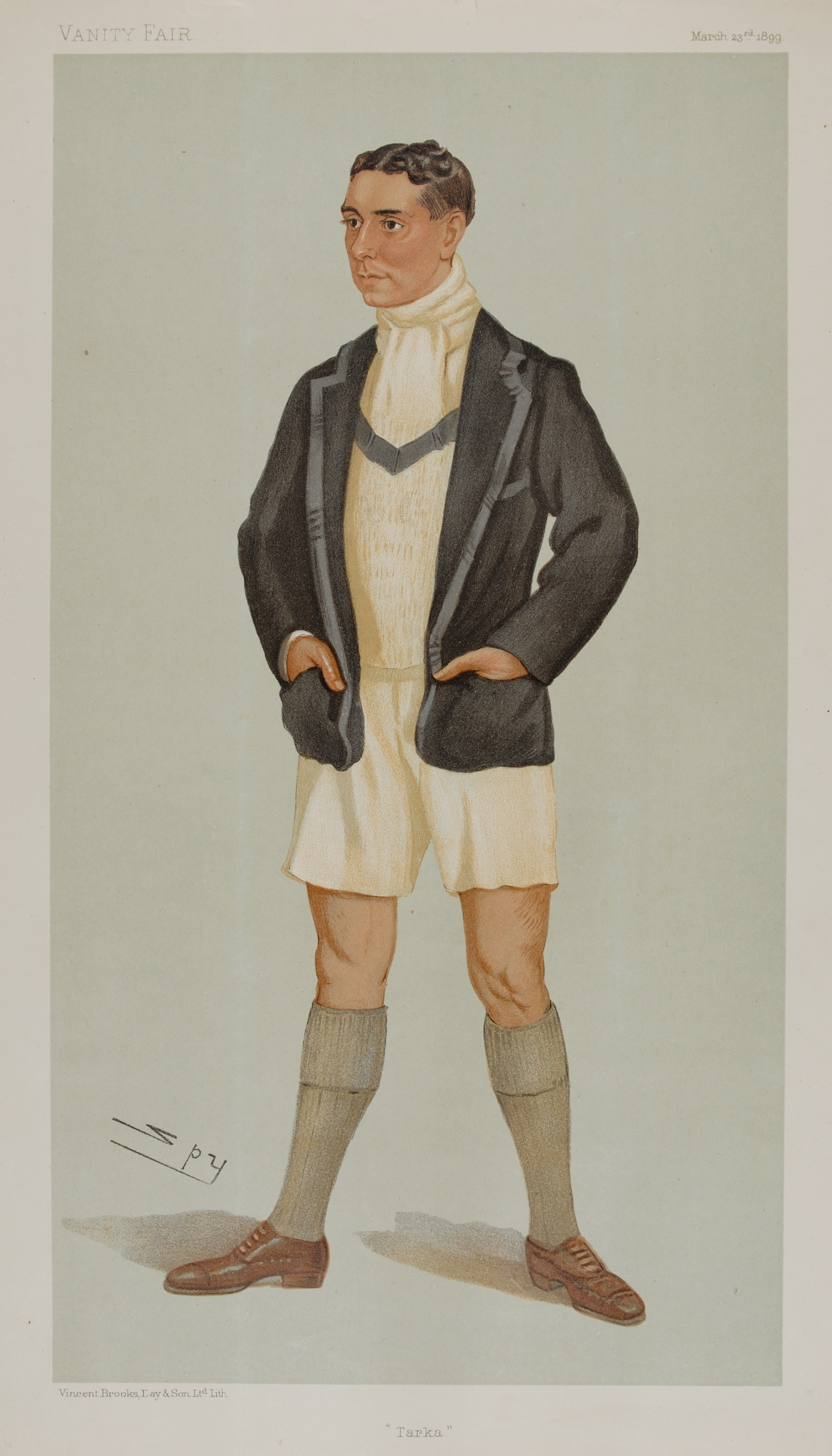
Harcourt Gilbey Gold coached the Oxford crew.

The Boat Race is a side-by-side rowing competition between the University of Oxford (sometimes referred to as the "Dark Blues") and the University of Cambridge (sometimes referred to as the "Light Blues"). The race was first held in 1829, and since 1845 has taken place on the 4.2-mile (6.8 km) Championship Course on the River Thames in southwest London. The rivalry is a major point of honour between the two universities and followed throughout the United Kingdom and worldwide. Cambridge went into the race as reigning champions, having won the 1922 race by one length, while Oxford led overall with 39 victories to Cambridge's 34 (excluding the "dead heat" of 1877).

Oxford were coached by G. C. Bourne who had rowed for the university in the 1882 and 1883 races, Harcourt Gilbey Gold (Dark Blue president for the 1900 race and four-time Blue) and E. D. Horsfall (who had rowed in the three races prior to the First World War). Cambridge's coaches were Harald Peake (who had participated in the Peace Regattas of 1919), G. L. Thomson and David Alexander Wauchope (who had rowed in the 1895 race). For the fifteenth year the umpire was old Etonian Frederick I. Pitman who rowed for Cambridge in the 1884, 1885 and 1886 races.

According to author and former Oxford rower G. C. Drinkwater, the Oxford trial eights were "of a better average than those of the preceding years" and after they arrived at Putney, the Dark Blue crew "improved rapidly up to the day of the race". Conversely he reported that Cambridge suffered "a dearth of good heavy-wrights" and that the crew "were not of very high class".

== Crews ==
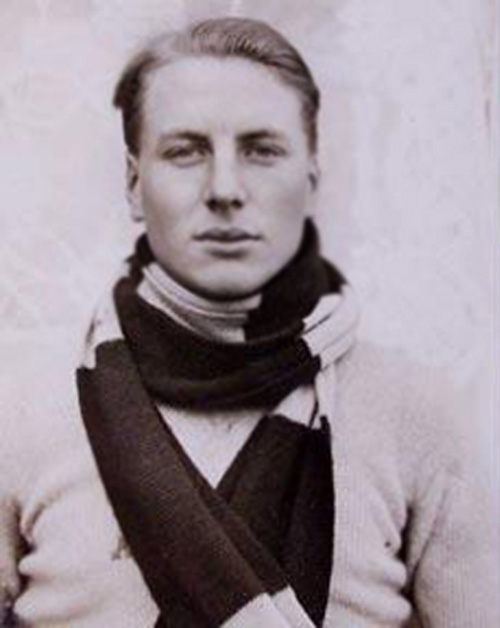
A. C. Irvine rowed at number 3 for Oxford.

The Cambridge crew weighed an average of 12 st 8.875 lb (80.0 kg), 0.375 pounds (0.2 kg) per rower more than their opponents. Oxford's crew included four rowers with Boat Race experience, including P. C. Mallam and Guy Oliver Nickalls who were both participating in their third consecutive event. Nickalls was a silver medallist in the men's eight at the 1920 Summer Olympics. Cambridge's crew included three rowers who had represented the university in the previous year's race: K. N. Craig, B. G. Ivory and David Collet. Two of the participants in the race were registered as non-British: Cambridge's Kane and Mellen were from the United States.

Seat	Oxford			Cambridge		
Seat	Name	College	Weight	Name	College	Weight
Bow	P. C. Mallam	Queen's	11 st 12 lb	W. F. Smith	1st Trinity	11 st 7.5 lb
2	P. R. Wace	Brasenose	12 st 6.5 lb	F. W. Law	Lady Margaret Boat Club	12 st 12 lb
3	A. C. Irvine	Merton	12 st 10.5 lb	K. N. Craig	Pembroke	13 st 0 lb
4	R. K. Kane	Balliol	13 st 9.5 lb	S. H. Heap	Jesus	13 st 7.5 lb
5	G. J. Mower-White	Brasenose	13 st 11.5 lb	B. G. Ivory (P)	Pembroke	13 st 10 lb
6	J. E. Pedder	Worcester	13 st 3.5 lb	T. D. A. Collet	Pembroke	12 st 7 lb
7	G. O. Nickalls (P)	Magdalen	12 st 12 lb	R. E. Morrison	3rd Trinity	12 st 1 lb
Stroke	W. P. Mellen	Brasenose	10 st 12 lb	T. R. B. Sanders	3rd Trinity	11 st 12 lb
Cox	G. D. Clapperton	Magdalen	7 st 11 lb	R. A. L. Balfour	3rd Trinity	8 st 8 lb
Source: (P) – boat club president

== Race ==
The Championship Course along which the Boat Race is contested

Oxford won the toss and elected to start from the Surrey station, handing the Middlesex side of the river to Cambridge. Umpire Pitman started the race in calm conditions at 5:10 p.m. Apparently disrupted by the wake of a nearby moored steamer, Oxford's start was poor, allowing Cambridge to lead by a canvas' length after a minute. Despite this, Oxford had drawn level a minute later, to hold a small lead by the time the crews commenced the long bend. By the Mile Post, the Dark Blues held a quarter-length lead and by Hammersmith Bridge had extended this to three-quarters of a length. Spurting at The Doves pub, Oxford began to draw clear of Cambridge.

By Chiswick Eyot, Oxford accelerated away from the Light Blues and were two lengths clear before a spurt from Cambridge ahead of Barnes Bridge reduced the lead to a length and a quarter by the time the crews passed below the bridge. With the bend in the river in their favour, and pushing hard, Cambridge slowly gained on the Dark Blues but could not level terms. Oxford passed the finishing post with a lead of three-quarters of a length in a time of 20 minutes 54 seconds. It was their first victory in five years, the narrowest winning margin since the 1913 race and the slowest winning time since the 1920 race. The win took the overall record in the event to 40–34 in their favour.
