= John Couchman =

British rower

John Malcolm Couchman (Born 30 May 1913 Salisbury, Wiltshire, Great Britain - Died 17 November 2004 aged 91) was a British rower who competed at the 1936 Summer Olympics.

Couchman was educated at Christ Church, Oxford. In 1933, 1934 and 1935 he was a member of the losing Oxford boat in the Boat Races. In 1936, he was a member of the crew of the eight which came fourth representing Great Britain at the 1936 Summer Olympics in Berlin.

== See also ==
- List of Oxford University Boat Race crews
