= Kenneth Payne =

British rower

Kenneth Martin Payne (8 September 1912 – 24 April 1988) was a British rower who competed in the 1932 Summer Olympics.

Payne was the son of Dr John Ernest Payne, a surgeon, and his wife psychoanalyst Sylvia Payne. His father had rowed for Cambridge in the Boat Race in 1899 and 1900, and stroked the winning Leander Club four in the Stewards' Challenge Cup at Henley in 1900. Payne was educated at St Cyprian's School, Eastbourne and Eton College where as an outstanding all-round sportsman he was captain of rugby and captain of boats. He went on to Trinity College, Cambridge. In 1932 he was a member of the winning Cambridge boat in the Boat Race. The 1932 crew won the Grand Challenge Cup at Henley Royal Regatta rowing as Leander Club. They were subsequently chosen to represent Great Britain at the 1932 Summer Olympics in Los Angeles in the eights where they came fourth. At 19 years, 337 days Payne was the youngest British competitor at the games. He again rowed in the winning Cambridge crew in the Boat Race in 1934.

Payne subsequently coached Oxford crews. He umpired the Boat Race nine times.

Payne died in Rotherfield, East Sussex at the age of 74.

== See also ==
- List of Cambridge University Boat Race crews
