= Hugh Mason (rower) =

English rower

Hugh Walter Mason (7 February 1915 – 24 July 2010) was an English rower who competed at the 1936 Summer Olympics.

Mason was born at Chesterton, the son of Cecil Mason and his wife Norah Evers. He was educated at Cambridge University. In 1936 he was a member of the winning Cambridge boat in the Boat Race. Later in the year he was a member of the crew of the eight which came fourth representing Great Britain at the 1936 Summer Olympics in Berlin. He again rowed for Cambridge in the Boat Race in 1937.

== See also ==
- List of Cambridge University Boat Race crews
