= McAllister Lonnon =

English rower

McAllister Pender Lonnon (20 April 1916 – 28 January 1999) was an English rower who competed at the 1936 Summer Olympics.

Lonnon was educated at Westminster School and Trinity College, Cambridge. In 1935 and 1936 he was a member of the winning Cambridge boat in the Boat Race. Later in the year he was a member of the crew of the eight which came fourth representing Great Britain at the 1936 Summer Olympics in Berlin. He again rowed for Cambridge in the Boat Race in 1937.

== See also ==
- List of Cambridge University Boat Race crews
