= Thomas Cree =

Australian rower

Thomas Scott Cree DSC (1 May 1914 – 28 March 1990) was an Australian rower who competed for Great Britain at the 1936 Summer Olympics.

== Early life ==
Tom Cree, named for his grandfather, was born in Glasgow, Scotland. When Tom was three years old, his father Captain Robert Scott Cree, 1st/8th Battalion, Cameronians (Scottish Rifles), died of wounds sustained in the Third Battle of Gaza on 14 November 1917. Robert Cree is buried at Deir El Belah war cemetery.

Tom and his mother Zara Carvick Cree (née Webster) migrated to Australia when he was six. He was educated at Geelong Grammar School and Jesus College, Cambridge. Zara Cree later married Clive Evans and resided in Queensland.

== Sporting activities ==
In 1935 he partnered David Burnford to win Silver Goblets at Henley Royal Regatta. In 1936 he was a member of the winning Cambridge boat in the Boat Race. Later in the year Cree partnered Burnford in the coxless pair representing Great Britain at the 1936 Summer Olympics in Berlin, where they reached the semi-final stage. He again rowed for Cambridge in the Boat Race in 1937.

== World War II ==
Cree joined the Royal Australian Naval Volunteer Reserve in 1939 and left as a Lieutenant Commander in 1946.

While aboard HMAS Stuart (D00) he was mentioned in despatches in September 1940. He was awarded the Distinguished Service Cross for conduct in naval anti-submarine operations in the Mediterranean Sea in January 1941, which was presented in November 1943.

== Later life ==
In February 1943, Lieutenant Cree married Dorothy Jean Stewart Fraser in the Toorak Presbyterian Church. She was the daughter of Sir Colin and Lady Fraser.

Cree died at Darling Point, New South Wales in 1990.

== See also ==
- List of Cambridge University Boat Race crews
