= David Burnford =

British doctor and rower

David Wreyford Burnford (6 January 1915 – 10 June 1984) was a British medical doctor and rower who competed at the 1936 Summer Olympics.

== Life ==
Burnford was educated at Jesus College, Cambridge. In 1935 he partnered Thomas Cree to win Silver Goblets at Henley Royal Regatta. In 1936 he was a member of the winning Cambridge boat in the Boat Race. Later in the year he partnered Cree in the coxless pair representing Great Britain at the 1936 Summer Olympics in Berlin, but was unplaced.

Burnford became a medical doctor and in 1944 was serving as a surgeon lieutenant commander in the Royal Navy. He and his wife moved to Thunder Bay, Ontario, Canada where he practiced medicine until 1968. His wife was the novelist Sheila Burnford, who wrote The Incredible Journey, which was later adapted to a Disney movie of the same name.

After leaving Thunder Bay, the Burnfords moved to the United States in 1973.Thunder Bay Chronicle Journal, June 27,1984 David and Sheila eventually divorced, with both remarrying.

David Burnford practiced medicine in Florida until his medical licence was removed. In 1979 Burnford was caught with 10 pounds of cocaine in Florida. He beat the charges with the excuse that the drugs had been slipped into his luggage during a stopover in Peru as he was returning from England.Thunder Bay Chronicle Journal, June 27, 1984

Burnford relocated to Colorado. On June 9, 1984 he was questioned by the FBI after investigators seized 36 pounds of cocaine from the trunk of a car he had rented in New York. The car was found parked in Burnford's driveway. The FBI believed Burnford had driven the car from New York to Colorado.Thunder Bay Chronicle Journal, June 17, 1984

The very next day, on June 10, 1984 David Burnford was found dead in his home with a self-inflicted gunshot wound to his head.Colorado Springs Gazette Telegraph, 6/19/1984

== See also ==
- List of Cambridge University Boat Race crews
