= Alan Burrough =

Alan Burrough, CBE (22 February 1917 – 23 July 2002) was a British businessman, army officer and rower. He was Chairman of James Burrough Ltd, the distiller of Beefeater Gin.

Burrough rowed at Jesus College, Cambridge then at Thames Rowing Club. He rowed ten times at Henley Royal Regatta, reaching the final on six occasions but never winning. He was Captain of Thames in 1946-47 and President from 1978 until ill health forced him to retire a short while before his death. He was appointed a Steward of Henley Royal Regatta in 1951 and was on the Management Committee from 1960 to 1985. In 1987 he and his wife Rosie donated £515,000 to the regatta, enabling the purchase of a lease of Temple Island for 999 years.

Burrough married Rosemary June Bruce in November 1939.

In the Second World War, Burrough served as an artillery observation officer in North Africa and lost the lower part of his right leg. He was the owner of Corbiere (though the horse was registered in his son's name), which won the 1983 Grand National.
