= The Boat Race 1934 =

86th Boat Race
- Date: 17 March 1934
- Winner: Cambridge
- Margin of victory: 4 1/4 lengths
- Winning time: 18 minutes 3 seconds
- Overall record (Cambridge–Oxford): 45–40
- Umpire: Herbert Aylward Game (Cambridge)

Other races
- Women's winner: Oxford

The 86th Boat Race took place on 17 March 1934. Held annually, the Boat Race is a side-by-side rowing race between crews from the Universities of Oxford and Cambridge along the River Thames. Umpired by the former rower Herbert Aylward Game, Cambridge won by 4 1/4 lengths in a time of 18 minutes 3 seconds, the fastest winning time in the history of the Boat Race at the time of the event. The record eleventh consecutive victory took the overall record in the event to 45–40 in Cambridge's favour.

== Background ==
The Boat Race is a side-by-side rowing competition between the University of Oxford (sometimes referred to as the "Dark Blues") and the University of Cambridge (sometimes referred to as the "Light Blues"). The race was first held in 1829, and since 1845 has taken place on the 4.2-mile (6.8 km) Championship Course on the River Thames in southwest London. The rivalry is a major point of honour between the two universities; it is followed throughout the United Kingdom and, as of 2014, broadcast worldwide. Cambridge went into the race as reigning champions, having won the 1933 race by two and a quarter lengths, and led overall with 44 victories to Oxford's 40 (excluding the "dead heat" of 1877).

Cambridge were coached by T. A. Brocklebank (who had rowed for Cambridge three times between 1929 and 1931), Francis Escombe, F. E. Hellyer (who had rowed for the Light Blues in the 1910 and 1911 races) and Peter Haig-Thomas (four-time Blue for Cambridge between 1902 and 1905). Oxford's coaches were Stanley Garton (who had rowed three times between 1909 and 1911), John Houghton Gibbon (who had rowed for the Light Blues in the 1899 and 1900 races) and A. E. Kitchin (who had rowed in the 1908 race). The race was umpired by the former Cambridge rower Herbert Aylward Game, who had represented the Light Blues in the 1895 and 1896 races. Both crews rowed in boats built by Sims and used Ayling oars.

Oxford performed well in training, and according to the rowing correspondent of The Times they "were definitely a much better crew than Cambridge". However, the crew lost three members through illness, including president Gerald Ellison, and were forced to reorganise the boat. Cambridge had difficulty finding a suitable stroke for the race, eventually opting to place N. J. Bradley in that seat, even though The Times's correspondent noted that he "is not, and never could be, anything but a makeshift stroke". By the time of the race, Cambridge were markedly favourite to win, with former Oxford rower E. P. Evans, writing in The Manchester Guardian that the Light Blues would "win with comparative ease".

== Crews ==
The Oxford crew weighed an average of 12 st 12.5 lb (81.7 kg), 1.75 pounds (0.8 kg) per rower more than their opponents; at the time, jointly the crews were the heaviest in the history of the event. Bradley {Monkton Combe School and Pembroke College} and A. V. Sutcliffe were also the heaviest strokes on record. Two of the Cambridge crew returned to participate in the race, including Sambell who was rowing in his third consecutive event. Oxford's boat contained five former Blues including R. W. G. Holdsworth who was making his third appearance in four years for the Dark Blues. Three of the participants in the race were registered as non-British: Oxford's number six J. H. Lascelles was from New Zealand, while Cambridge's crew contained two Australians in William Sambell and D. J. Wilson.

Seat	Cambridge			Oxford		
Seat	Name	College	Weight	Name	College	Weight
Bow	A. D. Kingsford	Pembroke	11 st 8 lb	W. H. Migotti	Worcester	12 st 3.5 lb
2	C. K. Buckle	Magdalene	12 st 4.5 lb	R. W. G. Holdsworth	Brasenose	11 st 13.75 lb
3	W. G. R. M. Laurie	Selwyn	13 st 6 lb	P. Hogg	New College	12 st 13.75 lb
4	K. M. Payne (P)	3rd Trinity	12 st 6 lb	J. M. Couchman	Christ Church	13 st 3.25 lb
5	D. J. Wilson	Clare	13 st 0.5 lb	P. R. S. Bankes	Christ Church	14 st 9 lb
6	W. A. T. Sambell	Pembroke	12 st 5.5 lb	J. H. Lascelles	Balliol	11 st 12.5 lb
7	J. H. T. Wilson	Pembroke	12 st 13 lb	G. I. F. Thomson	Balliol	12 st 0.5 lb
Stroke	N. J. Bradley	Pembroke	14 st 1.25 lb	A. V. Suitcliffe	Trinity	14 st 2 lb
Cox	J. N. Duckworth	Jesus	7 st 13 lb	C. G. F. Bryan	Worcester	7 st 13 lb
Source: (P) – boat club president (Gerald Ellison acted as non-rowing president for Oxford)

== Race ==
The Championship Course along which the Boat Race is contested

Cambridge won the toss and elected to start from the Surrey station, handing the Middlesex side of the river to Oxford. Umpire Game started the race at 2:16 p.m. in sunny conditions, with both crews making an "excellent start". Oxford went off the quicker, out-rating the Light Blues by two strokes per minute and taking a canvas-length lead. By Beverley Brook the crews were level again and Cambridge took a small lead by the time they passed Craven Steps. The Dark Blues began to look tired by Craven Cottage and Bradley took the opportunity to push away and passed the Mile Post with a third of a length advantage. A spurt from Oxford at the Crab Tree pub was responded to by Cambridge who held a half-length lead before spurting again to go clear before Harrods Furniture Depository.

The Light Blues passed below Hammersmith Bridge two lengths ahead with another spurt by The Doves pub taking them further away from Oxford. A mistake from Duckworth, the Cambridge cox, took Cambridge into slower water which "must have lost his crew quite a couple of lengths", but Oxford could not capitalise on the error. Entering Chiswick Reach, the Dark Blues were two and a half lengths down and showed further signs of tiredness. Cambridge coped with the head wind and choppy water better and passed Chiswick Steps three lengths ahead. Despite another push from Oxford along King's Meadow, they failed to reduce the gap and the Light Blues passed below Barnes Bridge with a ten-second lead. Cambridge passed the finishing post leading by four and a quarter lengths in a time of 18 minutes 3 seconds. It was the Light Blues' eleventh consecutive victory in the quickest winning time in the history of the race, beating the existing record set by Oxford in the 1911 race by 26 seconds. The Dark Blues also beat the existing record as they passed the finishing post in 18 minutes 18 seconds. The victory took the overall record in the event to 45–40 in Cambridge's favour.
