= Lola Aylings =

Rowing boat manufacturer

- Predecessor: Aylings
- Founded: Huntingdon, United Kingdom (2001)
- Defunct: 2007
- Fate: Ceased production
- Headquarters: Huntingdon, United Kingdom
- Products: Rowing boats
- Parent: Lola Group
- Website: www.lola-aylings.com

Lola Aylings was a manufacturer of rowing boats. It was formed in early 2001 when Lola Group (a racing car/composite engineering company) purchased Aylings (an existing boat manufacturer) and was based in Huntingdon, United Kingdom.

Aylings was founded in 1859, originally making rowing oars. It began producing boats in the 1980s (after buying Carbocraft) and kayaks in 1998 (after buying Kobra Kayaks).

The company moved from Weybridge to Huntingdon in 2003. It ceased production in 2007.
