= David Collet =

British rower

Olympic medal record

Men's rowing
Bronze medal – third place	1928 Amsterdam	Single sculls

Theodore David Anthony Collet (19 October 1901 – 26 April 1984) was a British rower who competed in the 1928 Summer Olympics.

Collet was educated at Cambridge University and rowed for Cambridge in the Boat Race in 1922, 1923 and 1924. Cambridge won in 1922 and 1924 and Oxford won in 1923.

Collet joined Leander Club and concentrated on single sculls. In 1927 he won the Wingfield Sculls. In 1928 he competed at the 1928 Summer Olympics in Amsterdam and won the bronze medal in the single sculls competition. He retained the Wingfield Sculls in 1928 and won again in 1929.

== See also ==
- List of Cambridge University Boat Race crews
