= John Cherry (rower) =

English rower (1914–1943)

Personal information
- National team: United Kingdom
- Born: John Conrad Hazlehurst Cherry; 7 September 1914
- Died: 1 February 1943 (aged 28)
- Education: Westminster School; Brasenose College, Oxford

Sport
- Sport: Rowing
- Event: 1936 Olympics

John Conrad "Con" Hazlehurst Cherry (7 September 1914 – 1 February 1943) was an English rower who competed at the 1936 Summer Olympics held in Berlin, Germany.

== Rowing career ==
Cherry was born in Paddington and educated at Westminster School and Brasenose College, Oxford, having matriculated in 1933 as the Heath Harrison Minor Exhibitioner.

=== Oxford ===
He rowed in the Brasenose College 1st VIII from 1934 to 1938, and first rowed for the university in 1936 as a member of the losing Oxford boat in the Boat Race. Later in the year, he was a member of the crew of the eight which came fourth representing Great Britain at the 1936 Summer Olympics in Berlin.

In 1937 he became president of OUBC, and was in the crew that broke Cambridge's thirteen-year winning streak. He was OUBC president again in 1938, recording another win over Cambridge.

=== Henley Royal Regatta ===
Outside the Boat Race and the Olympics, Cherry also competed at Henley Royal Regatta. In 1936, he rowed in the Leander Club VIII, which came second in the Grand Challenge Cup, as well as the Brasenose College IV. In 1937 he rowed in the Leander Club IV, which won the Stewards' Challenge Cup, and in 1938 he rowed again in the Brasenose College IV.

He became captain of Leander Club from 1938 to 1943, and was president of the Brasenose College Junior Common Room, as well as being a member of the Phoenix Common Room and Vincent's Club.

=== Second World War ===
After being commissioned into the Royal Navy during World War II, Cherry was killed in action on 1 February 1943 when serving as a lieutenant on HMS Welshman, a cruiser-minelayer sunk by U-617, northeast of Tobruk. Since Cherry has no known grave, his name is commemorated on the Chatham Naval Memorial.

== Personal life ==
In 1940 he married Glory Rowe, sister of his 1937 Oxford crew mate, R.G. Rowe. He was survived by his widow and one daughter.

== See also ==
- List of Oxford University Boat Race crews
