= The Boat Race 1922 =

74th Boat Race
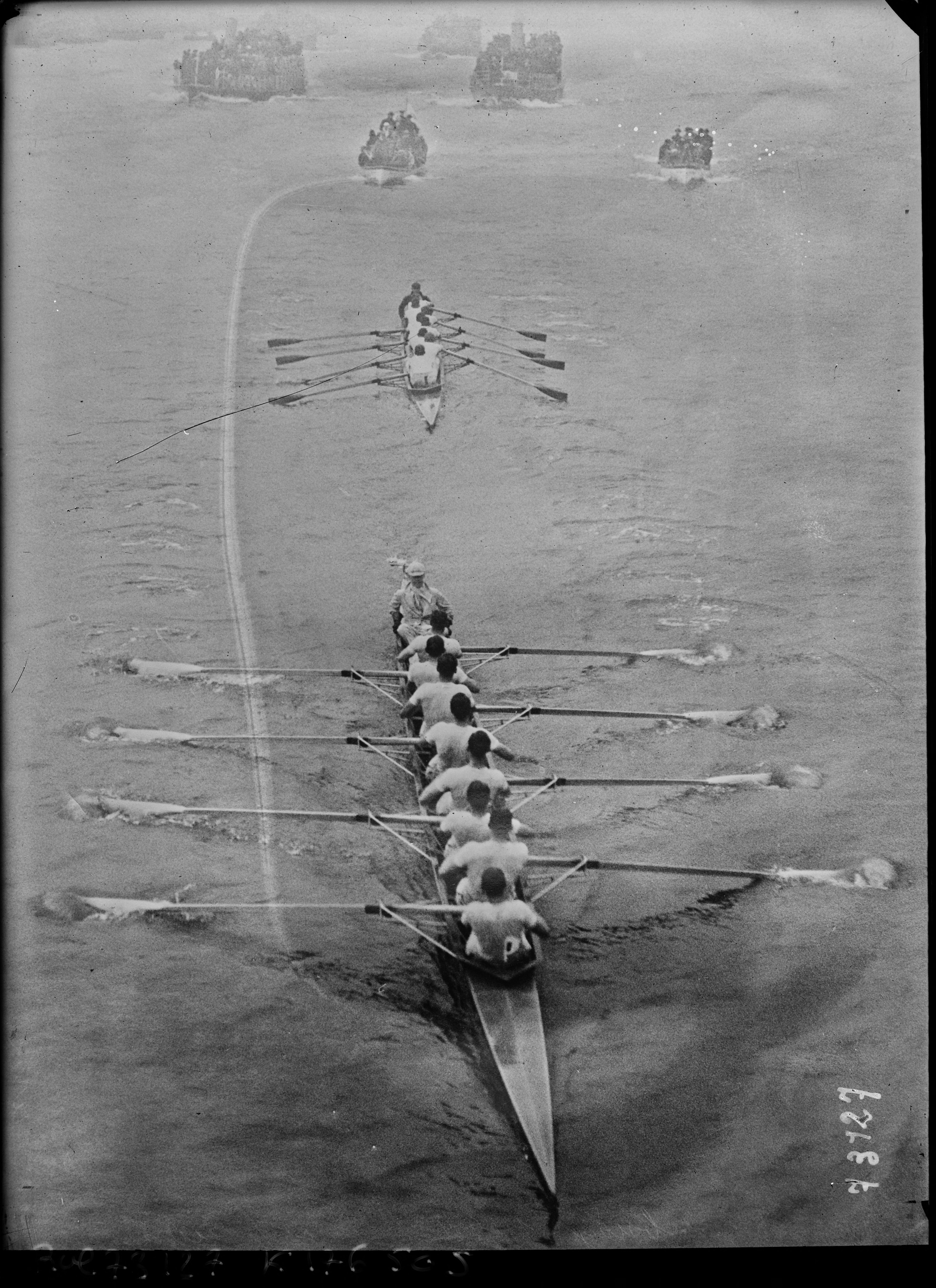
- Date: 1 April 1922
- Winner: Cambridge
- Margin of victory: 4 1/2 lengths
- Winning time: 19 minutes 27 seconds
- Overall record (Cambridge–Oxford): 34–39
- Umpire: Frederick I. Pitman (Cambridge)

The 74th Boat Race took place on 1 April 1922. Held annually, the Boat Race is a side-by-side rowing race between crews from the Universities of Oxford and Cambridge along the River Thames. Cambridge went into the race as reigning champions, having won the previous year's race, and had the significantly heavier crew. Four of the Oxford crew and three of the Cambridge crew had previous Boat Race experience. In this year's race, umpired by former rower Frederick I. Pitman, Cambridge won by 4 1/2 lengths in a time of 19 minutes 27 seconds. It was Cambridge's fourth consecutive victory, the largest winning margin since 1914 and the fastest winning time since 1911.

== Background ==
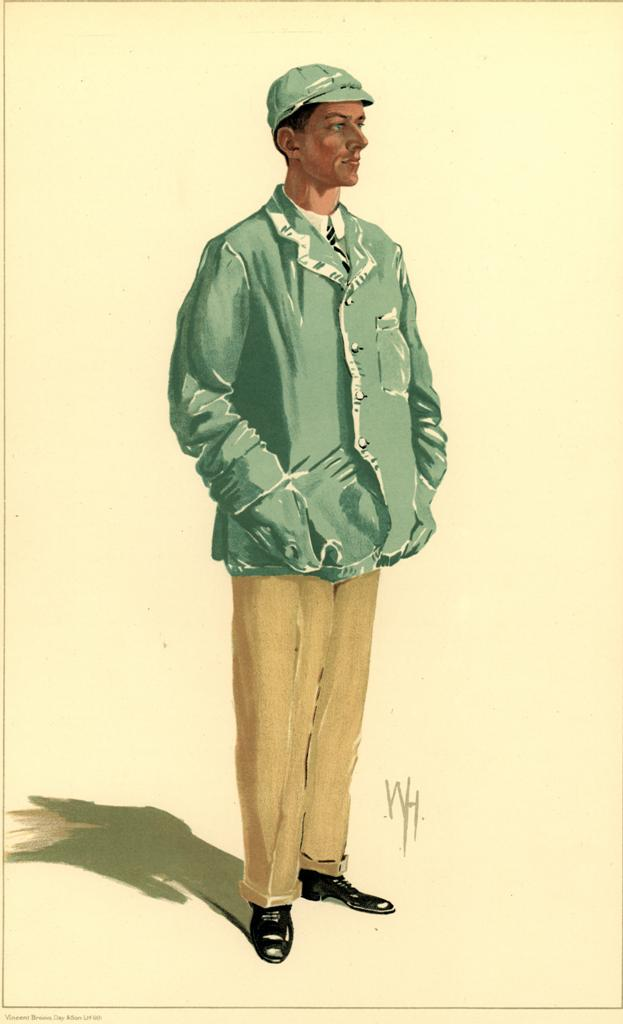
Sidney Swann coached the Cambridge crew.

The Boat Race is a side-by-side rowing competition between the University of Oxford (sometimes referred to as the "Dark Blues") and the University of Cambridge (sometimes referred to as the "Light Blues"). The race was first held in 1829, and since 1845 has taken place on the 4.2-mile (6.8 km) Championship Course on the River Thames in southwest London. The rivalry is a major point of honour between the two universities; it is followed throughout the United Kingdom and, as of 2014, broadcast worldwide. Cambridge went into the race as reigning champions, having won the 1921 race by one length, while Oxford led overall with 39 victories to Cambridge's 33 (excluding the "dead heat" of 1877).

Oxford's coaches were George Drinkwater who had rowed for Oxford in the 1902 and 1903 races, E. D. Horsfall (who had rowed in the three races prior to the First World War) and R. P. P. Rowe who had rowed four times between 1889 and 1892. Cambridge were coached by H. Peake (who had participated in the Peace Regattas of 1919), Sidney Swann (who had rowed in the four races from 1911 to 1914) and G. L. Thomson. For the fourteenth year the umpire was old Etonian Frederick I. Pitman who rowed for Cambridge in the 1884, 1885 and 1886 races.

== Crews ==
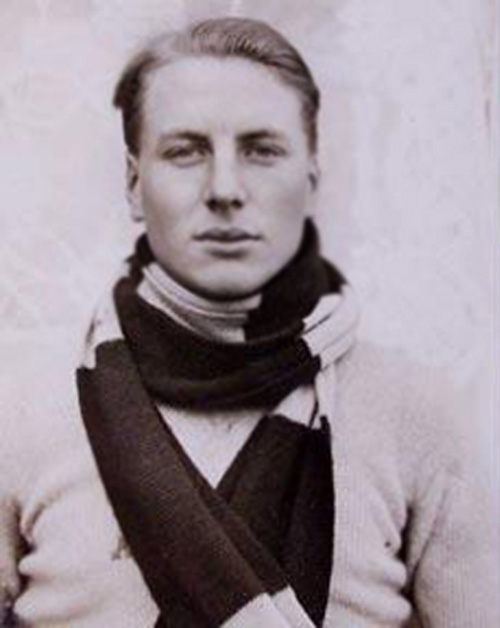
A. C. Irvine rowed at number 2 for Oxford.

The Cambridge crew weighed an average of 12 st 11 lb (81.0 kg), 7 pounds (3.2 kg) per rower more than their opponents. Five of the Oxford crew had previous Boat Race experience, including cox W. H. Porritt who was making his third appearance in the event. Cambridge's crew also included five individuals who had previously represented the university, including Humphrey Playford and P. H. G. H-S. Hartley who were rowing for the Light Blues for the third consecutive year. Two of the participants were silver medallists in the men's eight at the 1920 Summer Olympics: Oxford's Sebastian Earl, and Guy Oliver Nickalls. All of the participants in the race were registered as British.

Seat	Oxford			Cambridge		
Seat	Name	College	Weight	Name	College	Weight
Bow	P. C. Mallam	Queen's	11 st 6 lb	T. D. A. Collet	Pembroke	12 st 3 lb
2	A. C. Irvine	Merton	12 st 8 lb	A. J. Hodgkin	1st Trinity	12 st 6.5 lb
3	S. Earl	Magdalen	12 st 6.5 lb	K. N. Craig	Pembroke	12 st 8.5 lb
4	J. E. Pedder	Worcester	12 st 9 lb	A. D. B. Pearson	1st Trinity	13 st 10.5 lb
5	G. O. Nickalls	Magdalen	12 st 8 lb	H. B. Playford (P)	Jesus	13 st 10.5 lb
6	D. T. Raikes (P)	Merton	13 st 6.5 lb	B. G. Ivory	Pembroke	13 st 8 lb
7	G. Milling	Merton	11 st 10 lb	Hon. J. W. H. Fremantle	3rd Trinity	12 st 6.5 lb
Stroke	A. V. Campbell	Christ Church	11 st 5.5 lb	P. H. G. H.-S. Hartley	Lady Margaret Boat Club	11 st 6 lb
Cox	W. H. Porritt	Magdalen	8 st 10 lb	L. E. Stephens	Trinity Hall	9 st 4 lb
Source: (P) – boat club president

== Race ==
The Championship Course along which the Boat Race is contested

Cambridge won the toss and elected to start from the Middlesex station, handing the Surrey side of the river to Cambridge. In a light wind and with a good tide, umpire Pitman commenced the race at 4:40 p.m., which resulted in a false start, with Cambridge being released from their stakeboat too soon. After the restart, Cambridge were clear by the Mile Post and two lengths ahead of Oxford by the time the crews passed under Hammersmith Bridge.

According to Oxford's bow, George Drinkwater, Cambridge were "rowing well within themselves" and passed the finishing post four and a half lengths ahead in a time of 19 minutes 27 seconds. It was their fourth consecutive victory, the largest winning margin since the 1914 race and the fastest winning time since the 1911 race. The win took the overall record in the event to 39–34 in Oxford's favour.
