= Harrods Furniture Depository =

Coordinates: 51.48481°N 0.22824°W

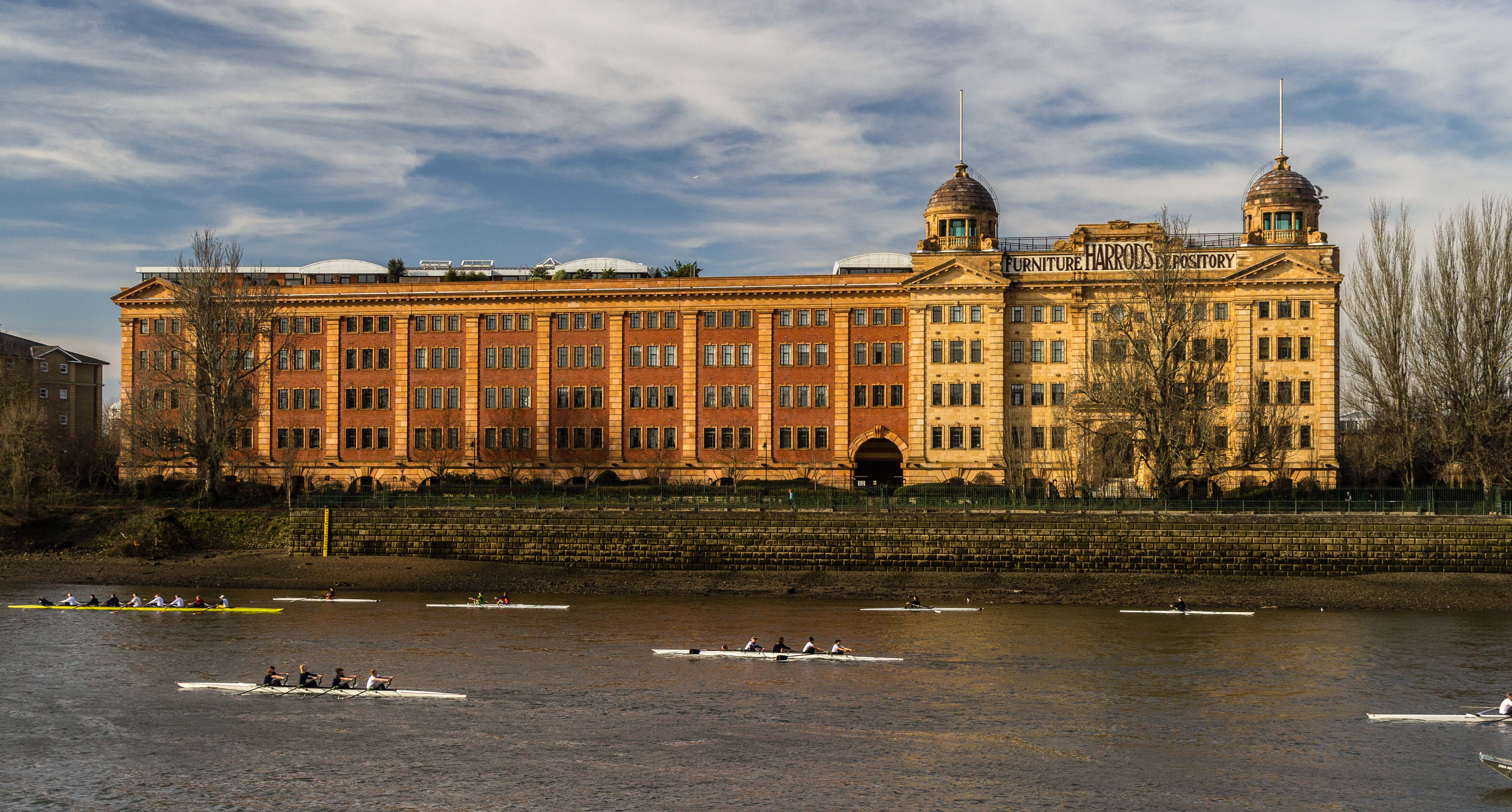

- Location within London Borough of Richmond upon Thames

General information
- Type: Depository
- Location: Barnes, London in the London Borough of Richmond upon Thames

Listed Building – Grade II
- Official name: Harrods Depository Riverside Warehouse to East
- Designated: 10-May-1990
- Reference no.: 1254280

The Harrods Furniture Depository buildings flank the south bank of the River Thames near Hammersmith Bridge in Barnes, London, England, built on the site of an old soap factory in 1894 as a storage centre for the larger items that could not be taken into Knightsbridge to the Harrods department store. The present salmon-pink terracotta-clad buildings date from 1914. The architect was W. G. Hunt.

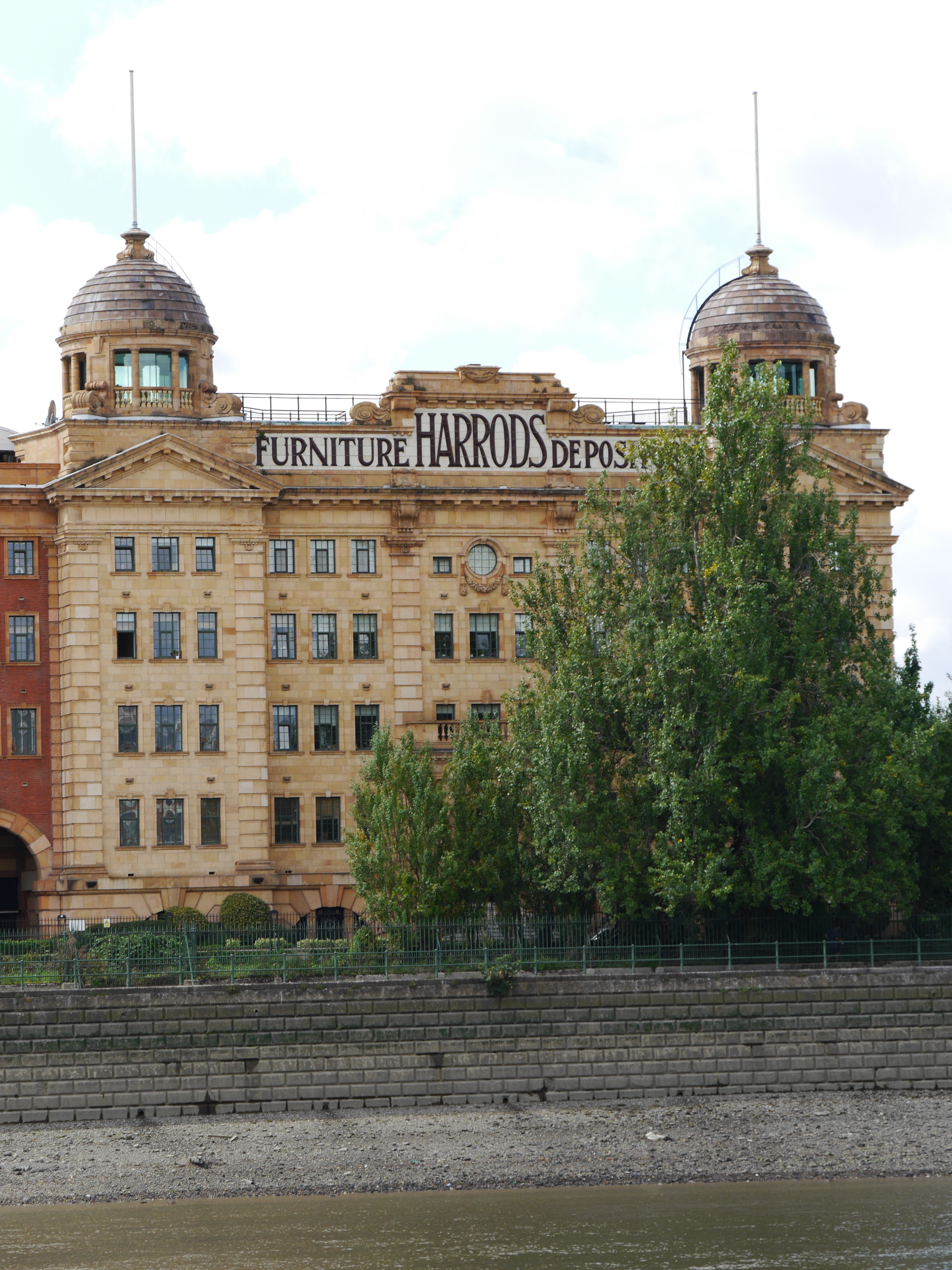

The buildings, which are Grade II listed, are no longer owned by Harrods but retain many of its original external features. In 2000 the conversion to a residential estate was completed, consisting of 250 townhouses and penthouse suites known as "Harrods Village". William Hunt Mansions, the main riverfront building, is a key marker post on the annual Oxford and Cambridge Boat Race between Putney Bridge and Chiswick Bridge.

The buildings can be seen in the music video of the Verve's 1997 song "Lucky Man", which were filmed opposite.
