= Christ Church Boat Club =

British rowing club

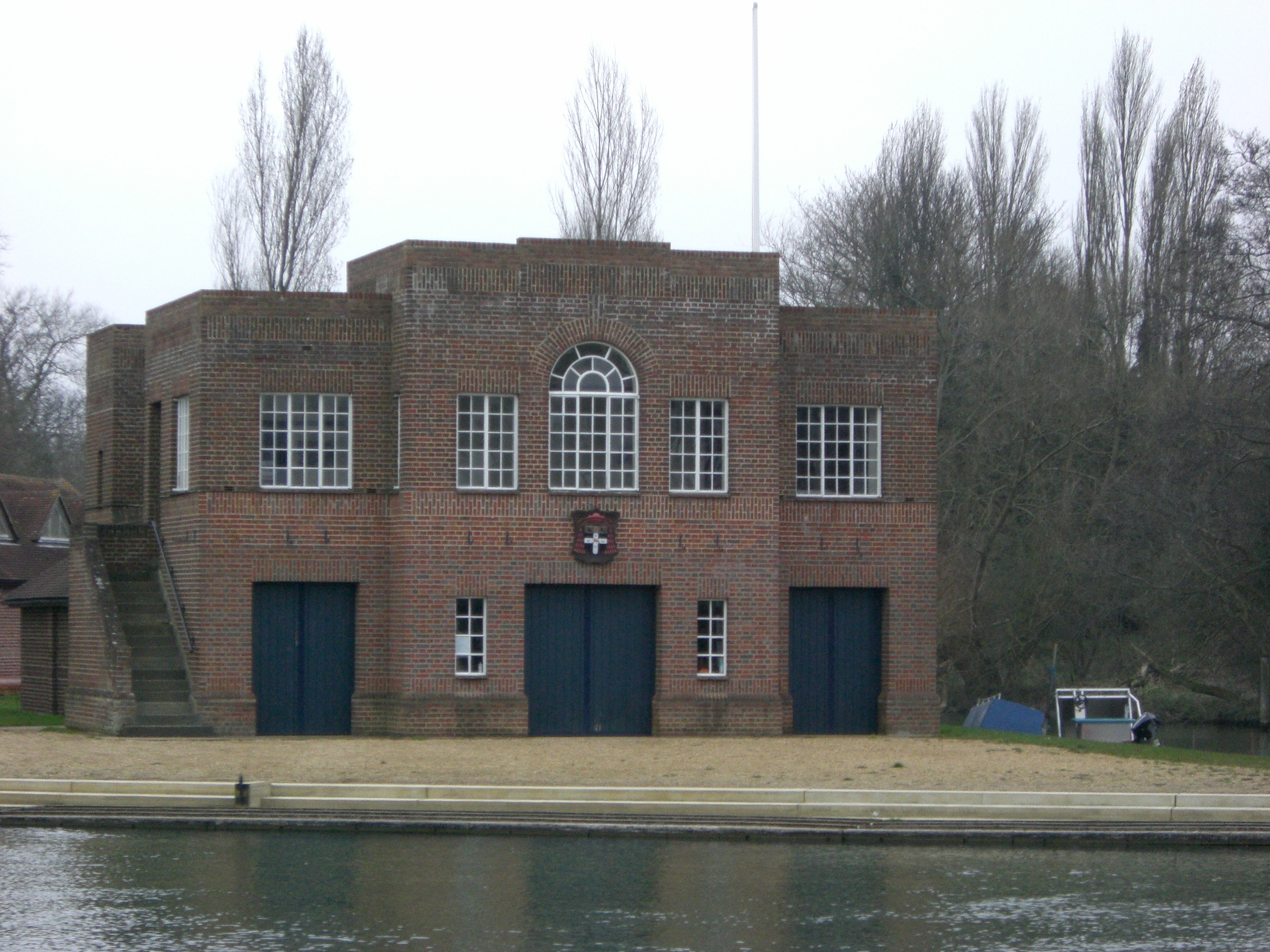

- Christ Church boathouse
- Location: Boathouse Island, Christ Church Meadow, Oxford
- Coordinates: 51.742497°N 1.248350°W
- Home water: The Isis
- Founded: Pre-1817
- Key people: Amber Softley (President); Timothy Herd (Secretary); Isabella Lucas (Women's Captain); Fraser Chapman (Men's Captain); Rachel McCormac (Captain of Coxes)
- Headships: Summer Eights: 35; Torpids: 15
- University: University of Oxford
- Colours: Dark Blue
- Affiliations: British Rowing (boat code CHB); First and Third Trinity Boat Club (Sister college's boat club)
- Website: www.chch.ox.ac.uk/current-students/boat-club

Christ Church Boat Club (ChChBC) is a rowing club for members of Christ Church, Oxford and Kellogg College, Oxford. It is based on the Isis at Boathouse Island, Christ Church Meadow, Oxford.

Christ Church have enjoyed success in intercollegiate bumps racing, having won 50 headships across both Summer Eights and Torpids - the second most of any Oxford college - and have provided more rowers for The Boat Race than any other Oxford college.

== History ==
Christ Church Boat Club is one of the oldest rowing clubs in the world, being founded before 1817. In 1817 the Men's crew won 'Head of the River' at VIIIs, and in 1828 they became the first Oxford crew to row against a crew from outside of the University, when racing Leander in London. In the inaugural 1829 boat race there were five rowers from Christ Church. This led to Oxford University Boat Club adopting Christ Church's dark blue, and also inspired the shade of Oxford Blue used as the official colour of the University.

Shortly after the admittance of women to the college, a crew was formed and raced for the first time in 1981. More recently three women competed in the 2019 boat race, and the Women's VIII went Head of the River in 2023 and 2024.

== Honours ==
=== Henley Royal Regatta ===
Year	Races won
1846	Silver Wherries
1847	Stewards' Challenge Cup, Visitors' Challenge Cup
1848	Stewards' Challenge Cup, Silver Wherries, Ladies' Challenge Plate, Visitors' Challenge Cup
1850	Visitors' Challenge Cup
1851	Visitors' Challenge Cup
1852	Silver Goblets
1854	Silver Goblets
1883	Ladies' Challenge Plate, Visitors' Challenge Cup
1889	Ladies' Challenge Plate, Thames Challenge Cup
1908	Grand Challenge Cup, Silver Goblets & Nickalls' Challenge Cup
1909	Visitors' Challenge Cup
1912	Visitors' Challenge Cup
1920	Ladies' Challenge Plate
1926	Visitors' Challenge Cup
1931	Silver Goblets & Nickalls' Challenge Cup
1932	Silver Goblets & Nickalls' Challenge Cup

=== Summer Eights ===
Year	Results
1817	Men's Headship
1818	Men's Headship
1819	Men's Headship
1825	Men's Headship
1826	Men's Headship
1828	Men's Headship
1830	Men's Headship
1831	Men's Headship
1832	Men's Headship
1834	Men's Headship
1835	Men's Headship
1836	Men's Headship
1844	Men's Headship
1847	Men's Headship
1848	Men's Headship
1849	Men's Headship
1907	Men's Headship
1908	Men's Headship

Year	Results
1909	Men's Headship
1924	Men's Headship
1925	Men's Headship
1926	Men's Headship
1927	Men's Headship
1958	Men's Headship
1962	Men's Headship
1971	Men's Headship
1973	Men's Headship
1974	Men's Headship
1975	Men's Headship
1985	Men's Headship
2009	Men's Headship
2010	Men's Headship
2017	Men's Headship
2023	Women's Headship
2024	Women's Headship

=== Torpids ===
Year	Results
1907	Men's Headship
1908	Men's Headship
1909	Men's Headship
1910	Men's Headship
1914	Men's Headship
1920	Men's Headship
1921	Men's Headship
1924	Men's Headship
1925	Men's Headship
1948	Men's Headship
1991	Men's Headship
2009	Men's Headship
2010	Men's Headship
2011	Men's Headship
2023	Men's Headship

=== Boat Race representatives ===
The following rowers were part of the rowing club at the time of their participation in The Boat Race.

Men

Year	Name
1829	J. E. Bates
1829	C. Wordsworth
1829	G. B. Moore
1829	T. Staniforth
1829	W. R. Fremantle +
1836	William Baillie
1836	Justinian Vere Isham
1836	Frederick Luttrell Moysey
1839	Samuel Edward Maberly
1839	Wm. Jas. Garnett
1840	S. E. Maberley
1841	Ed. Vaughan Richards
1845	M. Haggard
1845	W. H. Milman
1845	F. M. Wilson
1846	E. C. Burton
1846	W. H. Milman
1849	H. H. Tremayne
1849	E. C. Burton
1849	A. Mansfield
1849	W. G. Rich
1858	Richard Wm. Cotton +
1852	Philip Henry Nind
1852	Richard Wm. Cotton +
1854	T. H. Blundell
1854	Philip Henry Nind
1856	A. B. Rocke
1858	C. G. Lane
1859	C. G. Lane
1859	A. J. Robarts +
1860	T. F. Halsey
1860	A. J. Robarts +
1862	O. S. Wynne
1862	W. B. R. Jacobson
1862	R. E. L. Burton
1862	F. Hopwood +
1863	W. B. R. Jacobson
1863	F. Hopwood +
1864	W. B. R. Jacobson
1864	C. R. W. Tottenham +
1865	H. P. Senhouse
1865	C. R. W. Tottenham +
1866	H. P. Senhouse
1866	C. R. W. Tottenham +
1867	C. R. W. Tottenham +
1868	C. R. W. Tottenham +
1871	E. Giles
1872	T. H. Houblon
1873	J. B. Little
1873	W. E. Sherwood
1874	W. E. Sherwood
1875	E. O. Hopwood
1880	L. R. West
1881	L. R. West
1883	L. R. West
1884	A. G. Shortt
1885	F. O. Wethered
1886	F. O. Wethered
1887	F. O. Wethered
1888	M. E. Bradford
1890	W. A. L. Fletcher

Year	Name
1900	Lord Grimston
1900	H. B. Kittermaster
1904	H. W. Jelf
1904	E. C. T. Warner +
1906	Albert Gladstone
1907	G. E. Hope
1907	E. H. L. Southwell
1907	Albert Gladstone
1908	Harold Barker
1908	Albert Gladstone
1909	Albert Gladstone
1909	Harold Barker
1909	R. C. Bourne
1910	E. Majolier
1911	R. C. Bourne
1922	A. V. Campbell
1924	G. E. G. Gadsden
1925	C. E. Pitman
1925	E. C. T. Edwards
1925	M. R. Grant
1925	G. E. G. Gadsden
1925	A. V. Campbell
1926	P. W. Murray-Threipland
1926	T. W. Shaw
1926	W. Rathbone
1926	Hugh Edwards
1926	E. C. T. Edwards
1926	C. E. Pitman
1927	E. C. T. Edwards
1927	W. Rathbone
1927	T. W. Shaw
1928	T. W. Shaw
1928	P. W. Murray-Threipland
1930	Hugh Edwards
1930	Lewis Clive
1931	Lewis Clive
1931	W. D. C. Erskine-Crum
1932	W. D. C. Erskine-Crum
1933	W. D. C. Erskine-Crum
1933	J. M. Couchman
1933	P. R. S. Bankes
1934	J. M. Couchman
1934	P. R. S. Bankes
1935	P. R. S. Bankes
1935	J. M. Couchman
1936	J. S. Lewes
1946	J. R. L. Carstairs
1948	R. A. Noel
1950	P. Gladstone
1952	P. Gladstone
1955	G. Sorrell
1957	G. Sorrell
1957	P. F. Barnard
1958	G. Sorrell
1958	F. D. M. Badcock
1958	D. C. R. Edwards
1959	D. C. R. Edwards
1959	J. R. H. Lander
1962	J. Y. Scarlett
1963	D. C. Spencer
1964	D. C. Spencer

Year	Name
1965	D. C. Spencer
1970	J. K. G. Dart
1970	S. E. Wilmer
1971	K. Bolshaw
1971	S. D. Nevin
1971	C. R. W. Parish
1971	M. T. Eastman +
1972	K. Bolshaw
1972	P. D. E. M. Moncreiffe
1973	R. G. A. Westlake
1973	David Sawyier
1974	S. D. Nevin
1974	David Sawyier
1975	A. G. H. Baird
1975	J. E. Hutchings
1976	K. C. Brown
1976	A. G. H. Baird
1981	R. P. Emerton
1985	C. L. Richmond
1986	A. S. Green +
1987	Hugh M. Pelham
1988	Hugh M. Pelham
1988	Jonny Searle
1989	Jonny Searle
1990	Jonny Searle
1992	Elizabeth Chick +
1994	Elizabeth Chick +
2001	Robin Bourne-Taylor
2001	Jeremy C. Moncrieff +
2002	Robin Bourne-Taylor
2003	David Livingston
2003	Robin Bourne-Taylor
2004	David Livingston
2005	Robin Bourne-Taylor
2006	Jamie Schroeder
2008	Ben Smith
2008	Will England
2009	Benjamin Harrison
2010	Tyler Winklevoss
2010	Cameron Winklevoss
2012	Hanno Wienhausen
2012	Alexander Davidson
2013	Geordie Macleod
2013	Alexander Davidson
2013	Sam O'Connor
2014	Tom Swartz
2014	Sam O'Connor
2015	Sam O'Connor
2016	James White
2016	Nik Hazell
2017	William Warr
2017	Oliver Cook
2018	Claas Mertens
2018	Will Cahill
2018	Benedict Aldous
2019	Benedict Aldous
2022	Barnabé Delarze

Women

Year	Name
2017	Harriet Austin
2018	Sara Kushma
2019	Anna Murgatroyd

Men (Kellogg College)

Year	Name
2005	Joseph von Maltzahn
2008	Toby Medaris
2008	Charlie Cole
2009	Ante Kušurin
2010	Simon Gawlick
2013	Paul Bennett
2016	Leo Carrington
2021	Martin Barakso

Key

- + = coxswain

== Alumni ==
=== Notable Rowers ===
- Sir Albert Gladstone - British Rower, Olympic gold medalist in 1908
- Harold Barker - British Rower, Olympic silver medalist in 1908
- Lewis Clive - British Rower, Olympic gold medalist in 1932
- Hugh Edwards - British Rower, Olympic gold medalist in 1932
- Charles Grimes - American Rower, Olympic gold medalist in 1956
- David Sawyier - American Rower, Olympian in 1972
- Jonny Searle - British Rower, Olympic gold medalist in 1992 and bronze medalist in 1996
- Robin Bourne-Taylor - British Rower, Olympian in 2004 and 2008
- Jamie Schroeder - American Rower, Olympian in 2004 and 2008
- Cameron Winklevoss - American Rower, Olympian in 2008
- Tyler Winklevoss - American Rower, Olympian in 2008
- Barnabé Delarze - Swiss Rower, Olympian in 2016 and 2020
- Oliver Cook - British Rower, Olympian in 2020

== See also ==
- University rowing (UK)
- Oxford University Boat Club
- Christ Church, Oxford
- Rowing on the River Thames
