= The Boat Race 2013 =

159th Boat Race
- Date: 31 March 2013
- Winner: Oxford
- Margin of victory: 1 1/2 lengths
- Winning time: 17 minutes 27 seconds
- Overall record (Cambridge–Oxford): 81–77
- Umpire: Matthew Pinsent (Oxford)

Other races
- Reserve winner: Isis
- Women's winner: Oxford

The 159th Boat Race between crews from the University of Oxford and the University of Cambridge took place on 31 March 2013. Held annually, the event is a side-by-side rowing race between crews from the Universities of Oxford and Cambridge along the River Thames. The Cambridge crew featured the first rower from the Czech Republic to compete in the event. Umpired by former Olympic medallist and former Oxford rower Matthew Pinsent, Oxford won by a margin of 1 1/2 lengths in a time of 17 minutes and 27 seconds.

In the reserve race, Oxford's Isis defeated Cambridge's Goldie, and Oxford won the Women's Boat Race.

== Background ==
The Boat Race is a side-by-side rowing competition between the University of Oxford (sometimes referred to as the "Dark Blues") and the University of Cambridge (sometimes referred to as the "Light Blues"). First held in 1829, the race takes place on the 4.2-mile (6.8 km) Championship Course on the River Thames in southwest London. The rivalry is a major point of honour between the two universities and followed throughout the United Kingdom and broadcast worldwide. Cambridge went into the race as reigning champions, having won the disrupted 2012 race by 4 1/4 lengths, and led overall with 81 victories to Oxford's 76 (excluding the "dead heat" of 1877). The race was sponsored for the second consecutive year by BNY Mellon.

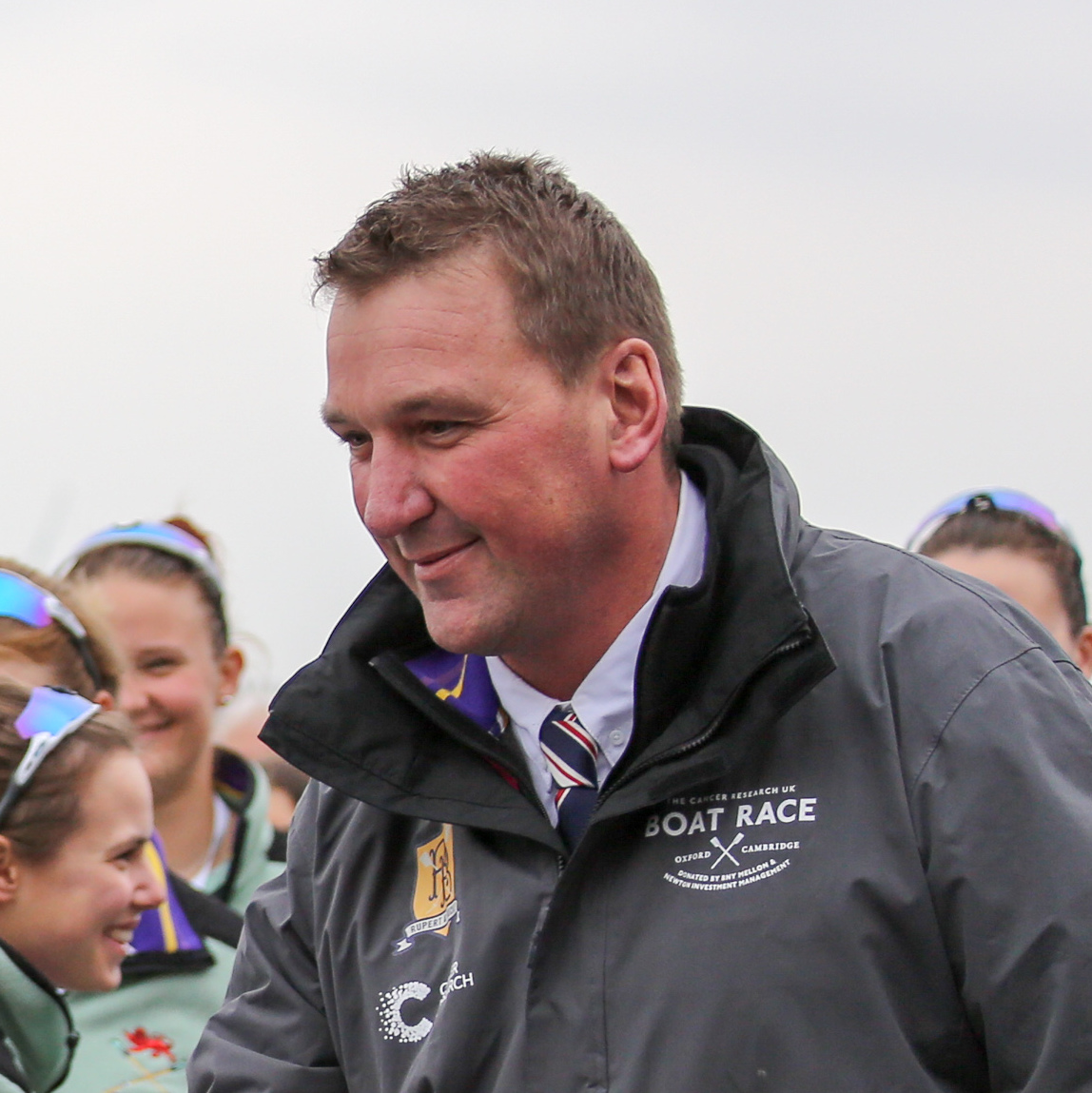
Matthew Pinsent (pictured in 2019) umpired the race.

Following the disruption caused by a protester in the previous year's race, Royal Marines provided support to the security arrangements surrounding the race. Race director David Searle urged nobody to repeat the disruption of 2012, saying "What I would say to anybody thinking of doing that, is that it's unbelievably dangerous ... We had practised emergency stops and it worked". The manner of any potential restart was modified to allow the race re-commence as soon as practicable. The Metropolitan Police had made contact with the protester, Trenton Oldfield, to assist him making a more peaceful protest should he wish to do so, but he declined the offer and did not attend the race in any capacity.

Oxford announced that they had named their boat Acer in honour of former cox Acer Nethercott who had died two months earlier from brain cancer. Nethercott, an Olympic silver medallist in Beijing, had coxed Oxford in the 2003, 2004 and 2005 races.

The first Women's Boat Race took place in 1927, but did not become an annual fixture until the 1960s. Up until 2014, the contest was conducted as part of the Henley Boat Races, but as of the 2015 race, it is held on the River Thames, on the same day as the men's main and reserve races. The reserve race, contested between Oxford's Isis boat and Cambridge's Goldie boat has been held since 1965. It usually takes place on the Tideway, prior to the main Boat Race.

== Crews ==
The Oxford crew weighed an average of 6 pounds (2.7 kg) per rower more than Cambridge. For the second consecutive year, Cambridge's crew featured just one British rower. Cambridge was coached by Steve Trapmore for the third time, and declared "It's the best crew I've had in my time at Cambridge". Oxford's Sean Bowden who was coaching the university for an eighteenth time, was "very satisfied" with his crew. Milan Bruncvík was the first Czech rower in the history of the Boat Race. Three medallists from the 2012 Summer Olympics featured: Cambridge's George Nash won a bronze for Great Britain in the coxless pair, Oxford's Constantine Louloudis won bronze for Great Britain in the men's eight and his crew-mate Malcolm Howard won silver for Canada in the same event.

Seat	Oxford						Cambridge					
Seat	Name	College	Age	Nationality	Weight	Height	Name	College	Age	Nationality	Weight	Height
Bow	Patrick Close	Pembroke	27	American	14 st 2 lb	6 ft 2 in	Grant Wilson	Pembroke	23	American	14 st 2 lb	6 ft 3 in
2	Geordie Macleod	Christ Church	21	British/American	13 st 10 lb	6 ft 2 in	Milan Bruncvík	Peterhouse	28	Czech	13 st 0 lb	6 ft 1 in
3	Alexander Davidson (P)	Christ Church	22	British	15 st 2 lb	6 ft 5 in	Alexander Fleming	Pembroke	23	Australian	15 st 5 lb	6 ft 5 in
4	Sam O'Connor	Christ Church	25	New Zealander	14 st 0 lb	6 ft 1 in	Ty Otto	Hughes Hall	24	American	14 st 4 lb	6 ft 7 in
5	Paul Bennett	Kellogg	24	British	15 st 11 lb	6 ft 10 in	George Nash (P)	St. Catharine's	23	British	14 st 13 lb	6 ft 4 in
6	Karl Hudspith	St Peter's	25	British	14 st 8 lb	6 ft 6 in	Steve Dudek	St Edmund's	24	American	16 st 0 lb	6 ft 8 in
7	Constantine Louloudis	Trinity	21	British	14 st 11 lb	6 ft 3 in	Alexander Scharp	St Edmund's	25	Australian	14 st 9 lb	6 ft 6 in
Stroke	Malcolm Howard	Oriel	29	Canadian	17 st 3 lb	6 ft 7 in	Niles Garratt	Hughes Hall	24	American	13 st 8 lb	6 ft 4 in
Cox	Oskar Zorrilla	St Hugh's	25	American	8 st 4 lb	5 ft 4 lb	Henry Fieldman	Homerton	24	British	8 st 8 lb	5 ft 4 in
Sources: (P) – boat club president

== Race ==
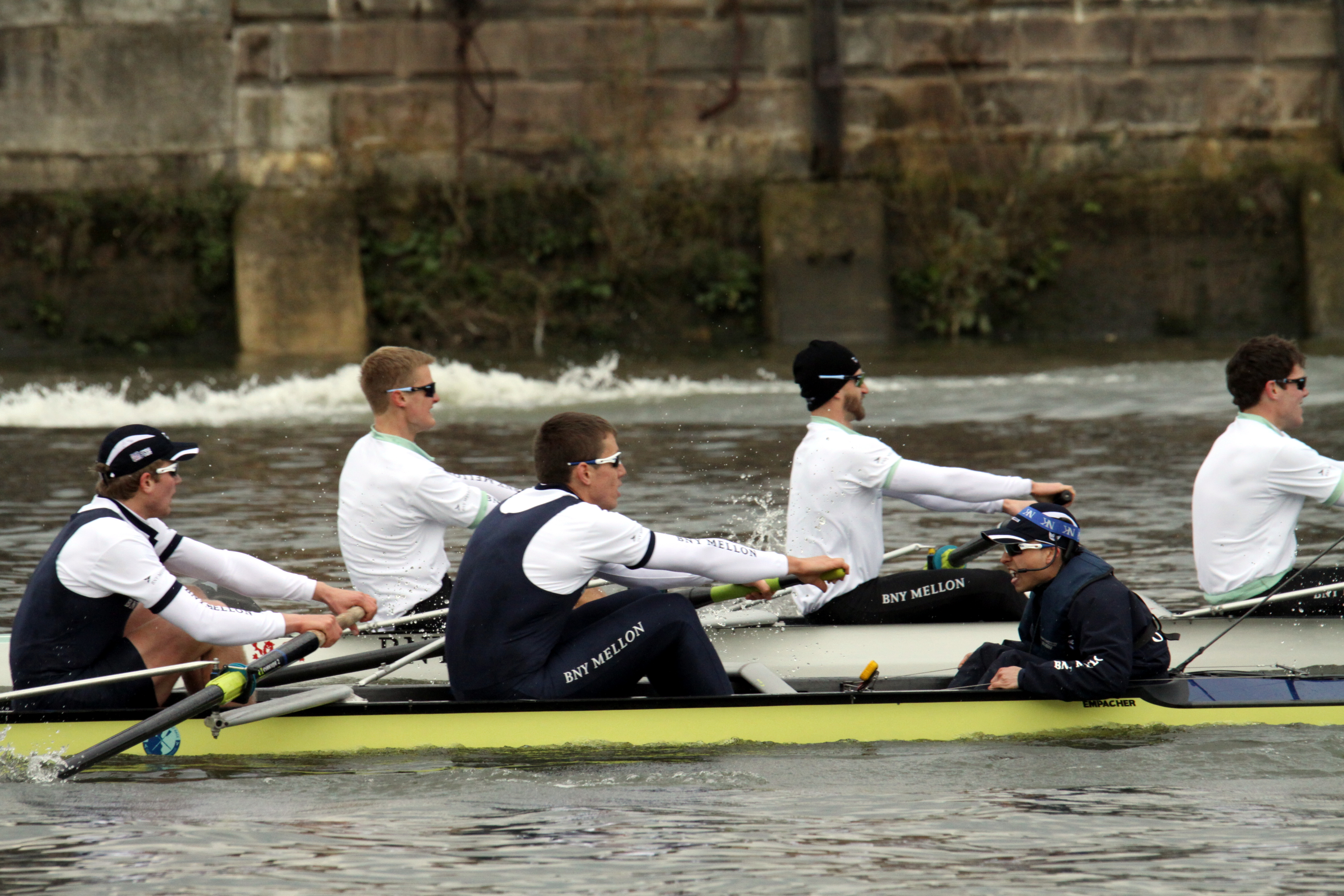
Oxford (in dark blue) lead Cambridge (white with light-blue trim)

Oxford won the toss and elected to start from the Surrey station. The weather conditions were adverse, with a "brisk wind" and snow flurries prior to the race. The race commenced at 4:31 p.m., and despite a good start from Cambridge, Oxford quickly moved to hold a half-length lead. With blades nearly overlapping, Umpire Pinsent issued warnings to both coxes to avoid a clash, and approaching Hammersmith Bridge, Oxford's lead extended to nearly a length. Cambridge kept in touch despite a push from Oxford, but by Barnes Bridge, Oxford were two lengths clear, and according to James Cracknell, they were "the fastest eight in the world right now." Oxford passed the finishing post 1 1/2 lengths clear, in a time of 17 minutes 27 seconds.

In the reserve race, Oxford's Isis defeated Cambridge's Goldie by one third of a length, the smallest margin of victory ever recorded in the reserves race. Oxford won the 68th Women's Boat Race by 1 3/4 lengths.

== Reaction ==
Olympic gold medallist Katherine Grainger presented Oxford with the trophy. Winning cox Zorilla said "It was fun, tough but that was what we expected. We had a plan and we stuck to it ruthlessly." His Light Blue counterpart, Fieldman, remarked: "I asked a lot of the guys and they gave it me every time. Unfortunately it wasn't quite enough.”

The BBC apologised for broadcasting Zorilla's repeated swearing. A microphone in the Oxford boat picked up the "bad language" during the latter half of the race which was subsequently broadcast live on both BBC One and the BBC World News channel. Further swearing from Zorilla was broadcast as he emerged from the Thames after the customary soaking of the victorious cox.
