= The Boat Race 2005 =

151st Boat Race
- Date: 27 March 2005
- Winner: Oxford
- Margin of victory: 2 lengths
- Winning time: 16 minutes 41 seconds
- Overall record (Cambridge–Oxford): 78–72
- Umpire: Boris Rankov (Oxford)

Other races
- Reserve winner: Goldie
- Women's winner: Cambridge

The 151st Boat Race took place on 27 March 2005. Oxford won the race by two lengths in a time of 16 minutes 41 seconds. The race, umpired by the six-time Boat Race winner Boris Rankov, featured seven Olympic rowers. It was the first time the event was broadcast in the United Kingdom on ITV.

In the reserve race Goldie beat Isis and Cambridge won the Women's race.

== Background ==
The Boat Race is an annual rowing eight competition between the University of Oxford and the University of Cambridge. First held in 1829, the competition is a 4.2-mile (6.8 km) race along The Championship Course on the River Thames in southwest London. The rivalry is a major point of honour between the two universities and followed throughout the United Kingdom and worldwide. Cambridge went into the race as reigning champions, having won the 2004 race by six lengths, and led overall with 78 victories to Oxford's 71 (excluding the "dead heat" of 1877). The race was sponsored by Xchanging for the first time, and it was the first year the event was televised in the United Kingdom by ITV, following a £1.75 million pound five-year deal, therefore ending the 50-year relationship the event had with the BBC.

The first Women's Boat Race took place in 1927, but did not become an annual fixture until the 1960s. Up until 2014, the contest was conducted as part of the Henley Boat Races, but as of the 2015 race, it is held on the River Thames, on the same day as the men's main and reserve races. The reserve race, contested between Oxford's Isis boat and Cambridge's Goldie boat, has been held since 1965. It typically takes place on the Tideway course shortly before the main Boat Race between the universities' first crews.

== Crews ==
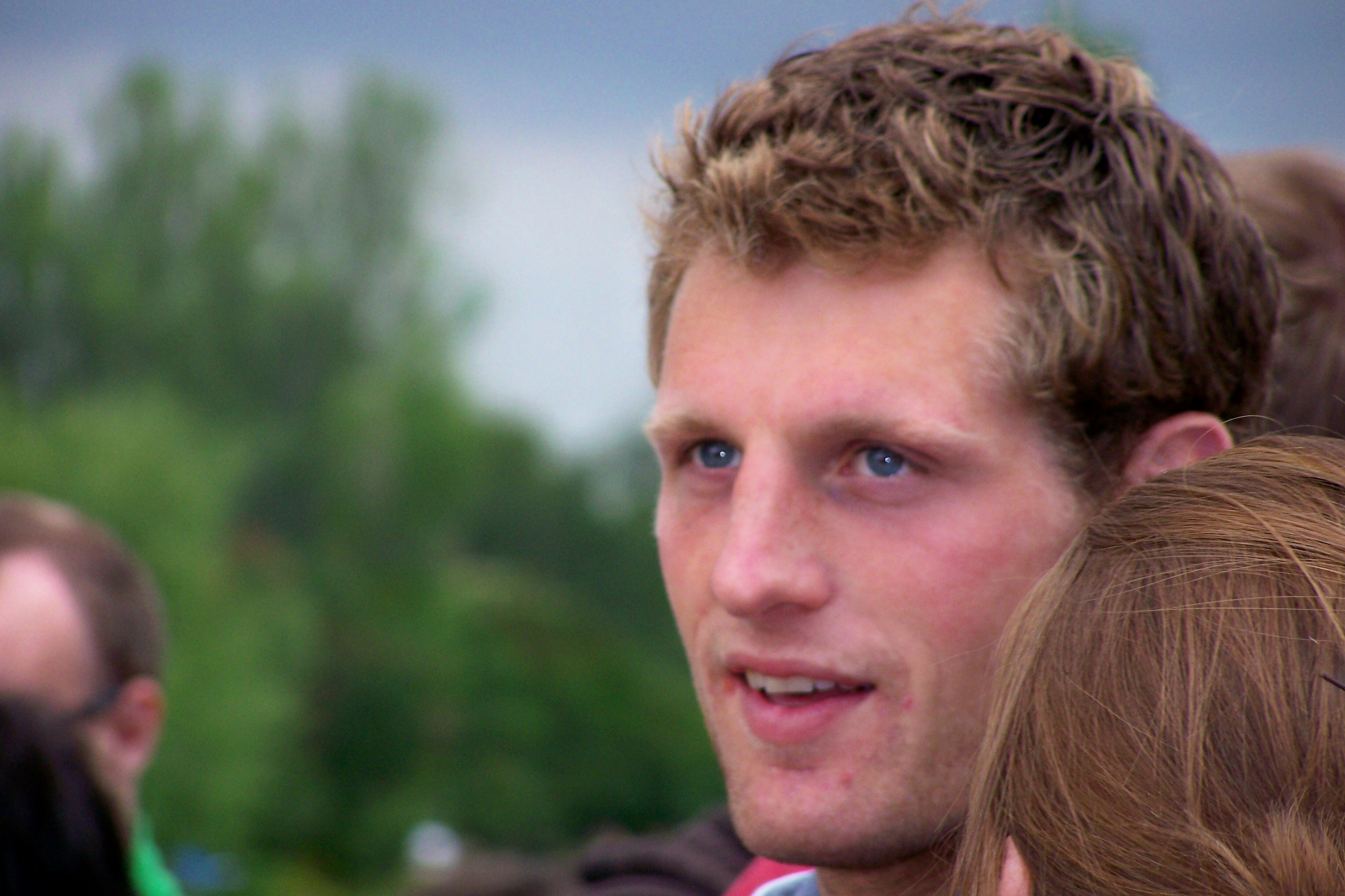
Robin Bourne-Taylor was Oxford's bowman.

The Oxford crew (sometimes referred to as the "Dark Blues") was the heaviest in Boat Race history, with over a 21 pounds (9.5 kg) per crew member over the Cambridge crew (sometimes referred to as the "Light Blues"). Both crews had an average age of 25. The Oxford crew included five Britons, three Americans, and one Canadian, while the Cambridge crew was made up of four Germans, three Britons, one American, and one Australian.

Seven of the rowers had represented their countries at the Olympic Games. In the Cambridge crew, Heidicker rowed for Germany at both the Sydney and Athens games, Briton Tom James, German Sebastian Schulte and American Luke Walton also rowed in Athens. Oxford's Olympians included Britons Andy Triggs Hodge and Robin Bourne-Taylor, and Canadian Barney Williams, all of whom competed in Athens. According to the BBC, the former Oxford coach Dan Topolski rated both crews as good enough to make an Olympic final.

Seat	Oxford				Cambridge			
Seat	Name	College	Nationality	Age	Name	College	Nationality	Age
Bow	Robin Bourne-Taylor	Christ Church	British	23	Luke Walton	St Edmunds	American	25
2	Barney Williams	Jesus	Canadian	28	Tom Edwards	Gonville and Caius	Australian	27
3	Peter Reed	British	Oriel	23	Henry Adams	St Edmund's	British	24
4	Joseph von Maltzahn	British	Kellogg	26	Steffen Buschbacher	St Catharine's	German	27
5	Chris Liwski	St Catherine's	American	24	Sebastian Schulte	Gonville and Caius	German	26
6	Mike Blomquist	St Peter's	American	23	Matthias Kleinz	Gonville and Caius	German	28
7	Jason Flickinger	Keble	American	27	Tom James	Trinity Hall	British	21
Stroke	Andy Triggs Hodge	St Catherine's	British	25	Bernd Heidicker	Hughes Hall	German	26
Cox	Acer Nethercott	University	British	27	Peter Rudge	Hughes Hall	British	23

== Race description ==
The Championship Course along which the Boat Race is run

Cambridge won the coin toss and elected to start from the northern bank (the "Middlesex side") of the Thames. At race time, conditions were cloudy and cool, with rain falling midway through. The race umpire was Boris Rankov, a six-time successful Oxford Blue.

Cambridge made a poor start allowing Oxford to take the early lead, but warnings from umpire Rankov forced the Oxford cox Acer Nethercott to steer out of the racing line and relinquish the advantage. As they approached Hammersmith Bridge, Oxford out-rated Cambridge and held a half-a-length lead. Taking a clear-water advantage before reaching Barnes Bridge, Oxford passed the finishing post two lengths ahead, with a time of 16 minutes, 41 seconds. It was their third victory in the previous four years and brought the overall result to 78–72 in Cambridge's favour. At the finish, following tradition, the Oxford crew threw their cox, Nethercott, into the water in celebration.

In the reserve race, Cambridge's Goldie beat Oxford's Isis. Earlier, Cambridge won the 60th Women's Boat Race by 2 1/3 lengths.

== Reaction ==
Oxford's number two, Williams, had lost out on gold in the Athens Olympics by two inches, he said "I knew how much it was going to hurt to lose so half of me is just so glad we didn't lose". The departing Cambridge coach Robin Williams said of his crew "They fought like tigers and should be proud of themselves". Cambridge's stroke Heidicker admitted "It was a bad start ... we never really established our own rhythm. Maybe we weren't cool enough in that situation."
