= The Boat Race 2001 =

147th Boat Race
- Date: 24 March 2001
- Winner: Cambridge
- Margin of victory: 2 1/2 lengths
- Winning time: 19 minutes 59 seconds
- Overall record (Cambridge–Oxford): 77–69
- Umpire: Rupert Obholzer (Oxford)

Other races
- Reserve winner: Goldie
- Women's winner: Cambridge

The 147th Boat Race was won by Cambridge by 2 1/2 lengths. It was the first time in the history of the event that the race was stopped and restarted, following a clash of blades.

In the reserve race Goldie beat Isis; Cambridge also won the Women's race.

== Background ==
The Boat Race is an annual competition between the boat clubs of the University of Oxford and the University of Cambridge. First held in 1829, the competition is a 4.2-mile (6.8 km) race along the River Thames in southwest London. The rivalry is a major point of honour between the two universities and followed throughout the United Kingdom and worldwide. Oxford went into the race as reigning champions, having won the 2000 race by three lengths, but Cambridge led overall with 76 victories to Oxford's 69 (excluding the "dead heat" of 1877). The race was sponsored by Aberdeen Asset Management for the second consecutive year.

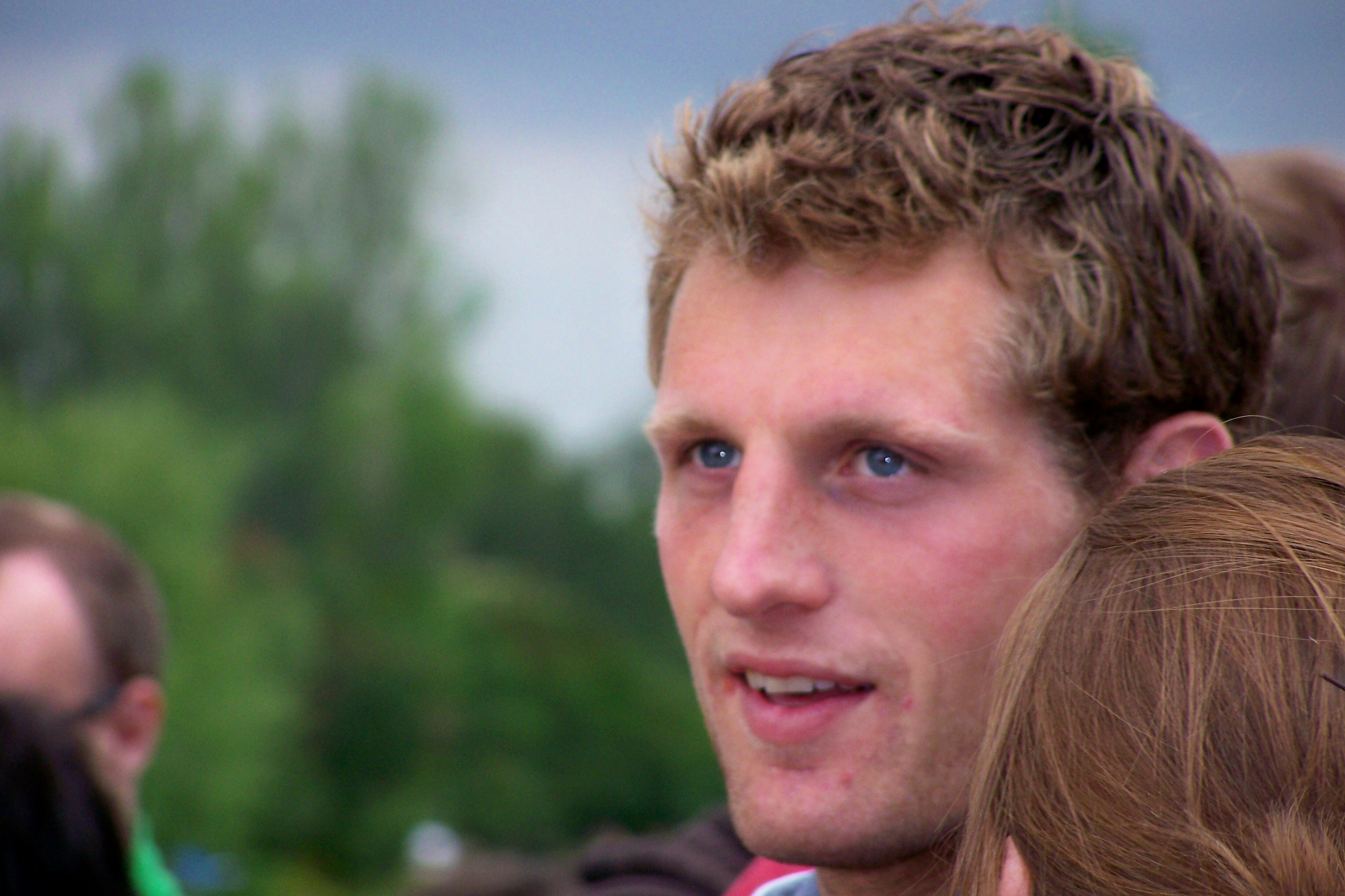
Robin Bourne-Taylor rowed at bow for Oxford.

The first Women's Boat Race took place in 1927, but did not become an annual fixture until the 1960s. Up until 2014, the contest was conducted as part of the Henley Boat Races, but as of the 2015 race, it is held on the River Thames, on the same day as the men's main and reserve races. The reserve race, contested between Oxford's Isis boat and Cambridge's Goldie boat has been held since 1965. It usually takes place on the Tideway, prior to the main Boat Race.

== Crews ==
The Oxford crew (sometimes referred to as the "Dark Blues") consisted of seven Britons, an American and a Norwegian, while the Cambridge crew (sometimes referred to as the "Light Blues") was composed of six Britons, a German, an Australian and a British/American. The Cambridge crew weighed, on average, 4.5 pounds (2.0 kg) more than their rivals, while Josh West, Cambridge's number five, was the tallest rower, at 6 ft 9 in (2.06 m).

Seat	Oxford				Cambridge			
Seat	Name	College	Nationality	Age	Name	College	Nationality	Age
Bow	Robin Bourne-Taylor	Christ Church, Oxford	British	19	Colin J C Swainson	Fitzwilliam College, Cambridge	British	23
2	Michael F Bonham	Oriel College, Oxford	British	20	Lukas P Hirst	St Edmund's College, Cambridge	Australian	28
3	Eirik B Lilledahl	Nuffield College, Oxford	Norwegian	27	Tom M Edwards-Moss	St John's College, Cambridge	British	20
4	Ian R W Weighell	Hertford College, Oxford	British	25	Rick Dunn	St Edmund's College, Cambridge	British	24
5	Dan Snow (P)	Balliol College, Oxford	British	22	Josh West	Gonville and Caius College, Cambridge	British/American	23
6	Ben J Burch	Pembroke College, Oxford	British	21	Kieran West (P)	Christ's College, Cambridge	British	23
7	Brian T Palm	Linacre College, Oxford	American	27	Tom Stallard	Jesus College, Cambridge	British	22
Stroke	Matt J Smith	St Catherine's College, Oxford	British	19	Tim Wooge	Peterhouse, Cambridge	German	28
Cox	Jeremy C Moncrieff	Christ Church, Oxford	British	19	Christian Cormack	St Edmund's College, Cambridge	British	24
Sources: (P) – boat club president

== Race ==
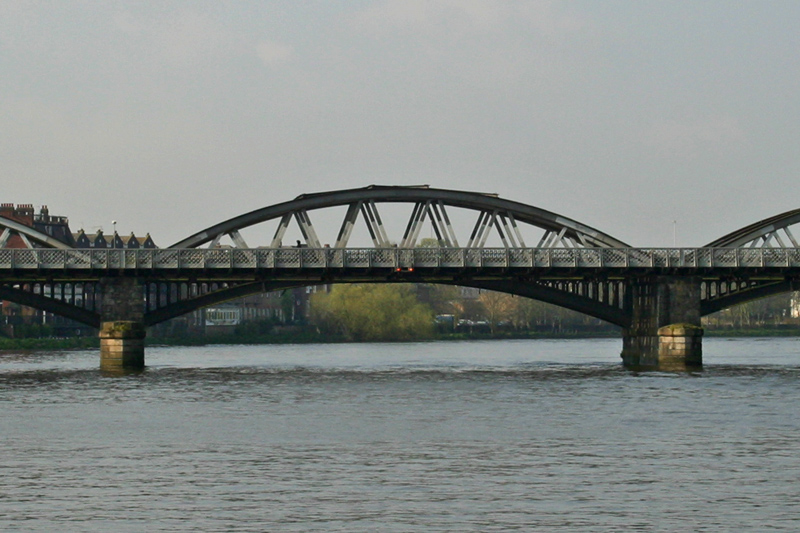
Cambridge held a two length lead at Barnes Bridge.

Boat club presidents Kieran West and Dan Snow met on the banks of the Thames at Putney for the coin toss at soon after noon on 24 March 2001. Cambridge won the toss and elected to start from the Surrey station. While the river was calm, rain began to fall just prior the start of the race. Oxford took an early lead, but both coxes were given warnings by race umpire Rupert Obholzer. A clash of blades ensued, with Cambridge's bow Colin Swainson losing his oar; this resulted in Obholzer calling for a restart for the first time in the history of the race. Once again, Oxford took the lead and held a two-second lead at Hammersmith Bridge. Although rating the same, Cambridge took the lead, to be ahead by half-a-length at the Surrey bend, and seven seconds ahead by Chiswick Steps. Extending their lead to more than two lengths by Barnes Bridge, Cambridge passed the finishing post in a time of 19 minutes 59 seconds. It was Cambridge's eighth win in nine races, and took their overall lead to 77 victories to Oxford's 69.

In the reserve race Goldie beat Isis by six lengths in a time of 19 minutes, 36 seconds. Cambridge also won the Women's race by three feet.

== Reaction ==
Race umpire Obholzer stated "I could have disqualified Oxford but both sides were responsible". Cambridge president and number six West said "Both teams had a good row but we had good rhythm and pushed really hard", while Oxford president Snow remarked "The Boat Race is not fair... six months' work to be screwed by the system. We have got to deal with that". BBC commentator and former Light Blue president Richard Phelps believed that Cambridge "deserved" the win and that "it was the superior power and application of it that saw Cambridge slowly pull clear of Oxford". Cambridge coach Robin Williams said "It was a brave, quick decision by the umpire", while former Dark Blue and Olympic gold medallist Matthew Pinsent suggested the clash was simply a racing incident and that the race could have been allowed to continue. He added: "There is no yellow card offence between a warning and disqualification". Oxford coach Sean Bowden blamed the defeat on the restart: "We rowed with a lot of courage ... but having to restart after that great first take-off really hurt us. It just put us at a disadvantage from then on".
