= The Boat Race 1964 =

110th Boat Race
- Date: 28 March 1964
- Winner: Cambridge
- Margin of victory: 6 1/2 lengths
- Winning time: 19 minutes 18 seconds
- Overall record (Cambridge–Oxford): 61–48
- Umpire: K. M. Payne (Cambridge)

Other races
- Women's winner: Cambridge

The 110th Boat Race took place on 28 March 1964. Held annually, the event is a side-by-side rowing race between crews from the Universities of Oxford and Cambridge along the River Thames. The Oxford crew was the heaviest in Boat Race history. The race was won by Cambridge by six-and-half lengths. Cambridge won the Women's Boat Race.

== Background ==
The Boat Race is a side-by-side rowing competition between the University of Oxford (sometimes referred to as the "Dark Blues") and the University of Cambridge (sometimes referred to as the "Light Blues"). The race was first held in 1829, and since 1845 has taken place on the 4.2-mile (6.8 km) Championship Course on the River Thames in southwest London. The rivalry is a major point of honour between the two universities, followed throughout the United Kingdom and broadcast worldwide. Oxford went into the race as reigning champions, having won the previous year's race by five lengths, while Cambridge led overall in the event with 60 victories to Oxford's 48 (excluding the "dead heat" of 1877).

The first Women's Boat Race took place in 1927, but did not become an annual fixture until the 1960s. Up until 2014, the contest was conducted as part of the Henley Boat Races, but as of the 2015 race, it is held on the River Thames, on the same day as the men's main and reserve races. This year's women's race was the first to be held since 1952.

Writing in the Financial Times, Joseph Mallalieu noted that the Boat Race was subsidised by The Varsity Match every year. Despite Oxford being "firm favourites" upon their arrival at the Tideway, Cambridge put in better performances in training, and by the time of the race were considered the favourites themselves. The main race was umpired for the eighth and final time by the former Olympian Kenneth Payne who had rowed for Cambridge in the 1932 and 1934 races.

== Crews ==
Although it was the heaviest Cambridge crew ever, they weighed an average of 13 st 4.75 lb (84.5 kg), almost 3 pounds (1.4 kg) per rower less than Oxford, who were the heaviest crew in Boat Race history. Oxford saw two former Blues return in Miles Morland and Duncan Spencer, while Cambridge's crew included four Boat Race veterans in Donald Legget, Mike Bevan, John Lecky and Christopher Davey. Lecky was a Canadian international rower who had won a silver medal in the men's eight at the 1960 Summer Olympics. Six of Oxford's crew came from Keble College, five of those schooled at Eton College.

Seat	Oxford			Cambridge		
Seat	Name	College	Weight	Name	College	Weight
Bow	J. Leigh-Wood	Keble	12 st 3 lb	D. F. Legget	Trinity Hall	12 st 10 lb
2	D. W. Steel	Keble	13 st 7 lb	M. V. Bevan	Downing	13 st 2 lb
3	D. W. A. Cox	St Peter's	13 st 7 lb	M. Muir-Smith	Christ's	14 st 0 lb
4	M. Q. Morland	Lincoln	14 st 6 lb	J. W. Fraser	Jesus	14 st 2 lb
5	R. C. T. Mead	Keble	14 st 0 lb	J. M. S. Lecky	1st & 3rd Trinity	14 st 3 lb
6	D. D. S. Skailes (P)	Keble	14 st 3 lb	J. R. Kiely	1st & 3rd Trinity	14 st 0 lb
7	D. G. Bray	Keble	13 st 1 lb	A. Simpson	Queens'	12 st 13 lb
Stroke	D. C. Spencer	Christ Church	13 st 5 lb	C. J. T. Davey (P)	Jesus	11 st 8 lb
Cox	M. J. Leigh	Keble	8 st 12 lb	R. G. Stanbury	Lady Margaret Boat Club	8 st 10 lb
Source: (P) – Boat club president

== Race ==
The Championship Course along which the Boat Race is contested

Cambridge won the toss and elected to start from the Surrey station, handing the Middlesex side of the river to Oxford. With a "calm, following wind", the race commenced at 2.20 p.m., and within a minute, Cambridge had a quarter-length lead before Oxford closed the gap at Craven Cottage. The Light Blues reached the Mile Post three seconds ahead and crossed over to the midstream. By Harrods Furniture Depository they had extended their lead out to two lengths and passed below Hammersmith Bridge a further half-length ahead. Despite a surge from Oxford, Cambridge were sixteen seconds ahead at Chiswick Steps and increased the gap to twenty seconds by Barnes Bridge. Cambridge won by 6 1/2 lengths in a time of 19 minutes 18 seconds, 23 seconds ahead of Oxford.

The victory was Cambridge's 61st in the contest, taking the overall score to 61–48. The Cambridge boat club president and stroke Christopher Davey said: "Everything went as planned, but Oxford hung on more than I would have liked at the end. I would have liked to have taken it to 10 lengths if possible but Oxford kept going splendidly at the end."

In the 20th running of the Women's Boat Race, Cambridge triumphed, their third consecutive victory.
