= The Boat Race 2003 =

Oxford versus Cambridge rowing

149th Boat Race
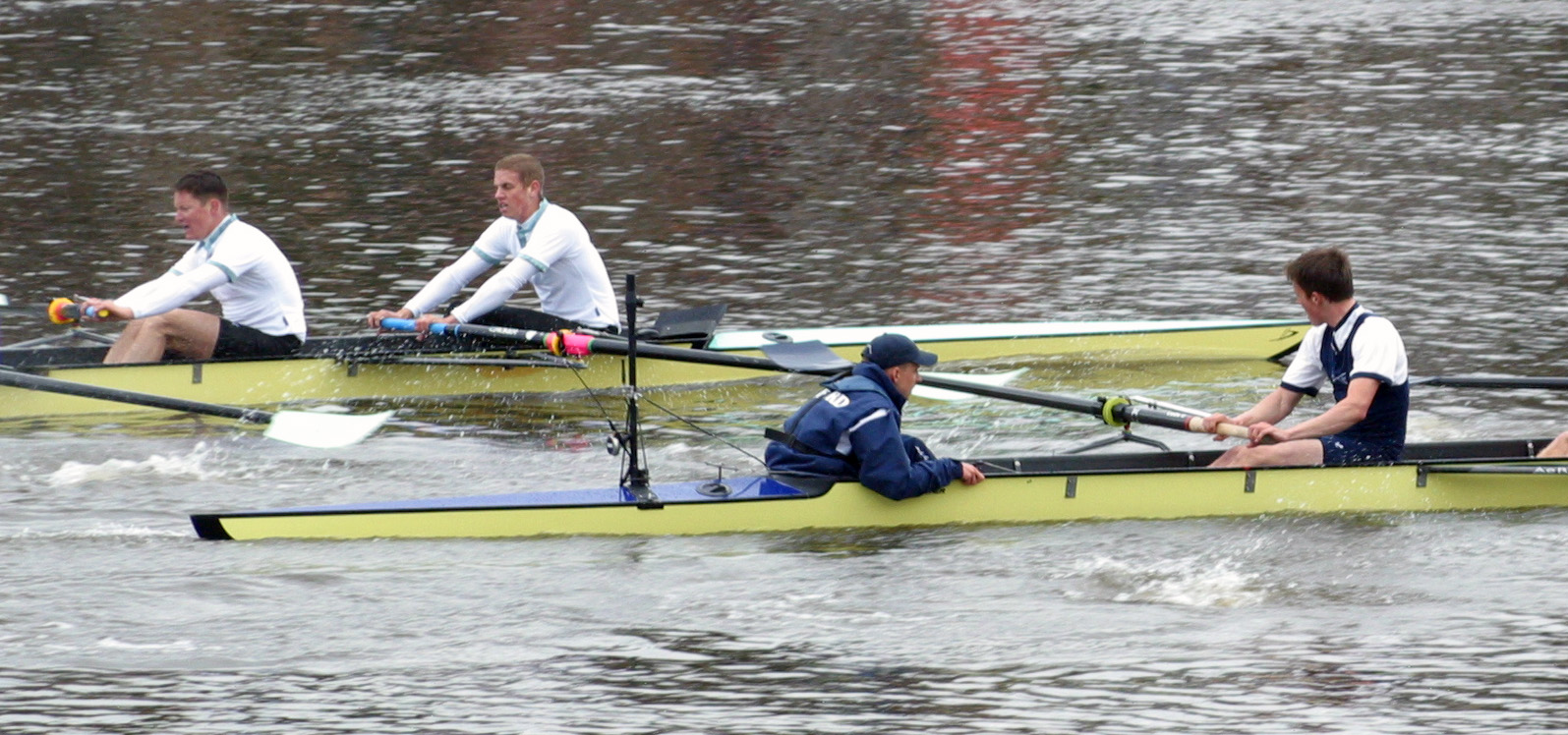
- Blades from both boats are close to clashing. Left to right: Coventry (Cantab.), B. Smith (Cantab.), Nethercott (Oxon.), M. Smith (Oxon.)
- Date: 6 April 2003
- Winner: Oxford
- Margin of victory: 1 foot
- Winning time: 18 minutes 6 seconds
- Overall record (Cambridge–Oxford): 77–71
- Umpire: Boris Rankov (Oxford)

Other races
- Reserve winner: Goldie
- Women's winner: Oxford

The 149th Boat Race took place on 6 April 2003. Held annually, the Boat Race is a side-by-side rowing race between crews from the Universities of Oxford (in dark blue) and Cambridge (in light blue) along a 4.2-mile (6.8 km) tidal stretch of the River Thames in south-west London. The lead changed twice during the race, which Oxford won by one foot (30 cm): the smallest margin of victory in the history of the event. The close race has been described as "epic", while Olympic gold medallist Steve Redgrave suggested that the race was the "greatest we will see in our lifetimes".

Umpired by the Boat Race veteran Boris Rankov, the 2003 race was the first to be scheduled on a Sunday. As a result of a collision between the Cambridge boat and a launch, a member of the Cambridge crew was replaced just two days before the race. This was the first Boat Race to feature two sets of brothers on opposing sides. In the reserve race Goldie beat Isis and Oxford won the Women's race.

== Background ==
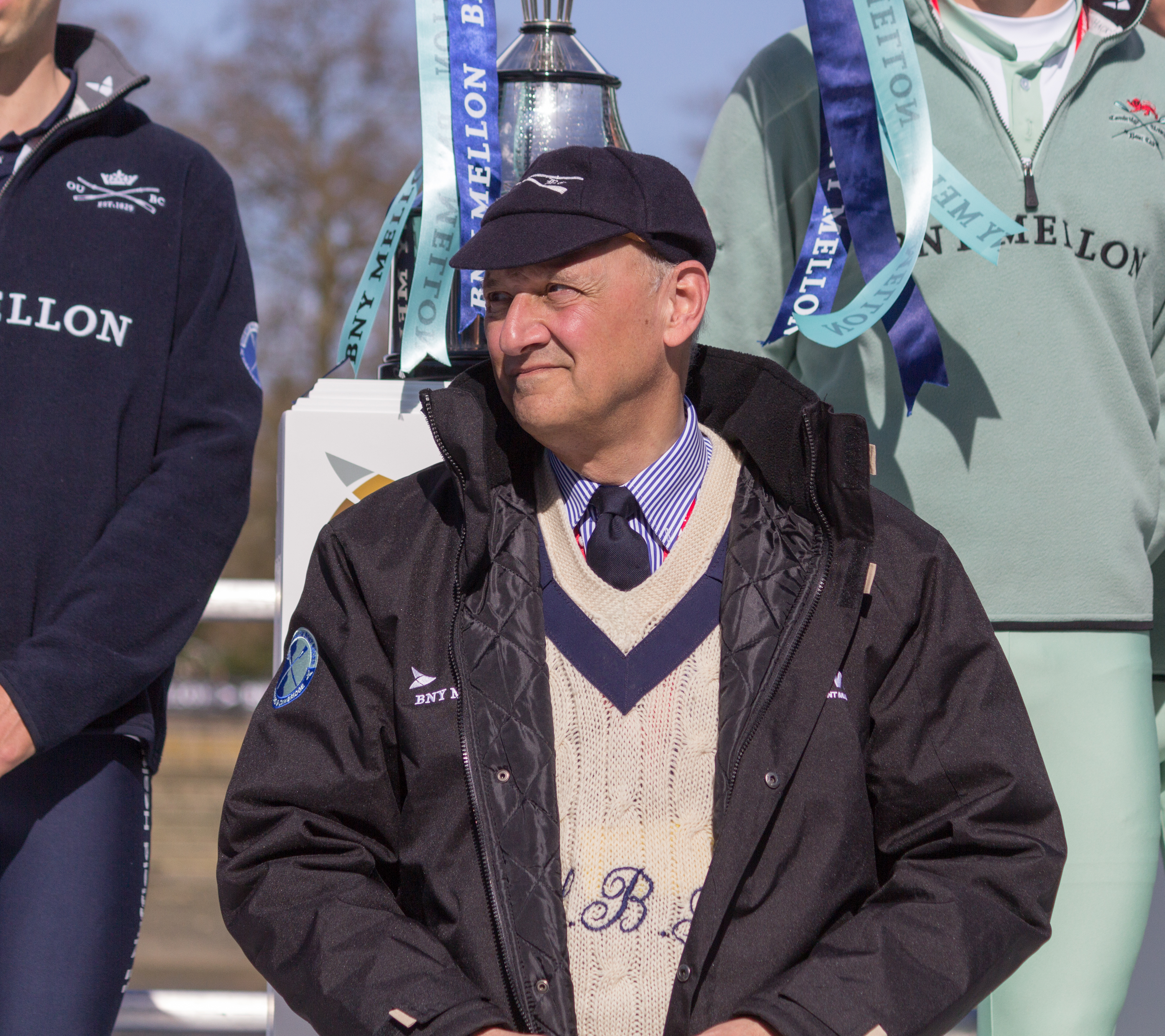
Boris Rankov (pictured in 2015) was the race umpire.

The Boat Race is a side-by-side rowing competition between the University of Oxford (sometimes referred to as the "Dark Blues") and the University of Cambridge (sometimes referred to as the "Light Blues"). First held in 1829, the race takes place on the 4.2-mile (6.8 km) Championship Course, between Putney and Mortlake on the River Thames in south-west London. The rivalry is a major point of honour between the two universities; it is followed throughout the United Kingdom and broadcast worldwide. Oxford went into the 2003 race as reigning champions, having won the previous year's race by three-quarters of a length, but Cambridge led overall with 77 victories to Oxford's 70 (excluding the "dead heat to Oxford by five feet" of 1877). The race was sponsored by Aberdeen Asset Management for the fourth consecutive year, and was the first to be scheduled on a Sunday, in order to avoid a clash with the live television broadcast of the Grand National. Although the 1984 race was held on a Sunday, it had been postponed from the Saturday following a collision between the Cambridge boat and a barge.

The first Women's Boat Race took place in 1927, but did not become an annual fixture until the 1960s. Up until 2014, the contest was conducted as part of the Henley Boat Races, but as of the 2015 race, it is held on the River Thames, on the same day as the men's main and reserve races. The reserve race, contested between Oxford's Isis boat and Cambridge's Goldie boat, has been held since 1965. It usually takes place on the Tideway, prior to the main Boat Race.

The umpire for the race was former Oxford rower Boris Rankov, who had represented the Dark Blues a record six times between 1978 and 1983. Cambridge were coached by Robin Williams (for the ninth time) while Oxford's coach was Sean Bowden, assisted by coxing adviser Dan Topolski.

== Crews ==
Wayne Pommen, the first-choice Cambridge bow, was injured two days before the race, fracturing his wrist following a full-speed collision with the harbourmaster's launch during a practice start. Matthias Kleinz was hit on the head but did not require medical attention. Cambridge number seven James Livingston said: "For a couple of seconds I thought I was going to die. We were going flat out and all of a sudden I heard Jim's [Omartian, cox] voice. I've never heard so much fear in anybody's voice before." Pommen was circumspect: "A few of us were feeling quite lucky last night ... at the same time, it was very frustrating and disappointing ... but there was no point sulking in the corner." Three oars were destroyed and two riggers bent; the boat was sent to Weybridge to be repaired. Pommen was replaced by Ben Smith, brother of the Oxford stroke Matthew. Not since the 1979 race had such a late change in the line-up of a crew been made. Along with James and David Livingston, this was the first time in the history of the Boat Race that two pairs of brothers would be racing against one another.

The official weigh-in took place on 1 April at the London Eye. The Cambridge crew had an advantage of 7 kilograms (15 lb) per member, representing the largest disparity between the crews since the 1990 event and the lightest Dark Blue crew since the 1975 race. Oxford were considered "underdogs" for the race. The Cambridge crew had an average age of 23, while Oxford's crew averaged 21. The Oxford crew featured seven Britons, an Australian and a Canadian, while the Cambridge crew consisted of four Britons, two Americans, two Germans and an Australian. Cambridge's Tim Wooge, the 30-year-old stroke rowing in his third Boat Race, was the first German president of Cambridge University Boat Club, and the heaviest man in the race. His Dark Blue counterpart Matthew Smith was rowing in his fourth Boat Race. Robin Bourne-Taylor, Basil Dixon and Matt Smith had rowed for Oxford in the 2002 race, while, in James Livingston, Cambridge saw just one Blue return from the previous year's event.

Seat	Oxford						Cambridge					
Seat	Name	Nationality	Age	Height	Weight	College	Name	Nationality	Age	Height	Weight	College
Bow	John Adams	British	20	6 ft 4 in (1.93 m)	83 kg (13.1 st)	University	Ben Smith‡	British	19	6 ft 3 in (1.91 m)	85 kg (13.4 st)	Trinity Hall
2	Basil Dixon	British	21	6 ft 2 in (1.88 m)	93 kg (14.6 st)	Pembroke	Kristopher Coventry	Australian	25	6 ft 5 in (1.96 m)	89 kg (14.0 st)	Queens'
3	Samuel McLennan	Australian	23	6 ft 2 in (1.88 m)	90 kg (14 st)	Corpus Christi	Hugo Mallinson	American	23	6 ft 5 in (1.96 m)	96 kg (15.1 st)	St Catharine's
4	David Livingston	British	19	6 ft 7 in (2.01 m)	92 kg (14.5 st)	Christ Church	Matthias Kleinz	German	27	6 ft 2 in (1.88 m)	83 kg (13.1 st)	Gonville and Caius
5	Robin Bourne-Taylor	British	21	6 ft 3 in (1.91 m)	87 kg (13.7 st)	Christ Church	Alexander McGarel-Groves	British	22	6 ft 6 in (1.98 m)	97 kg (15.3 st)	Peterhouse
6	Scott Frandsen	Canadian	22	6 ft 1 in (1.85 m)	82 kg (12.9 st)	St Edmund Hall	Tom James	British	19	6 ft 3 in (1.91 m)	86 kg (13.5 st)	Trinity Hall
7	Henry Morris	British	20	6 ft 1 in (1.85 m)	82 kg (12.9 st)	Magdalen	James Livingston	British	22	6 ft 5 in (1.96 m)	95 kg (15.0 st)	St Catharine's
Stroke	Matthew Smith (P)	British	20	6 ft 1 in (1.85 m)	81 kg (12.8 st)	St Anne's	Tim Wooge (P)	German	30	6 ft 7 in (2.01 m)	100 kg (16 st)	Peterhouse
Cox	Acer Nethercott	British	25	5 ft 8 in (1.73 m)	55 kg (8.7 st)	University	James Omartian	American	23	5 ft 6 in (1.68 m)	55 kg (8.7 st)	St Catharine's
‡ – Ben Smith replaced Wayne Pommen two days before the race (P) – boat club president

== Race descriptions ==
=== Main race ===
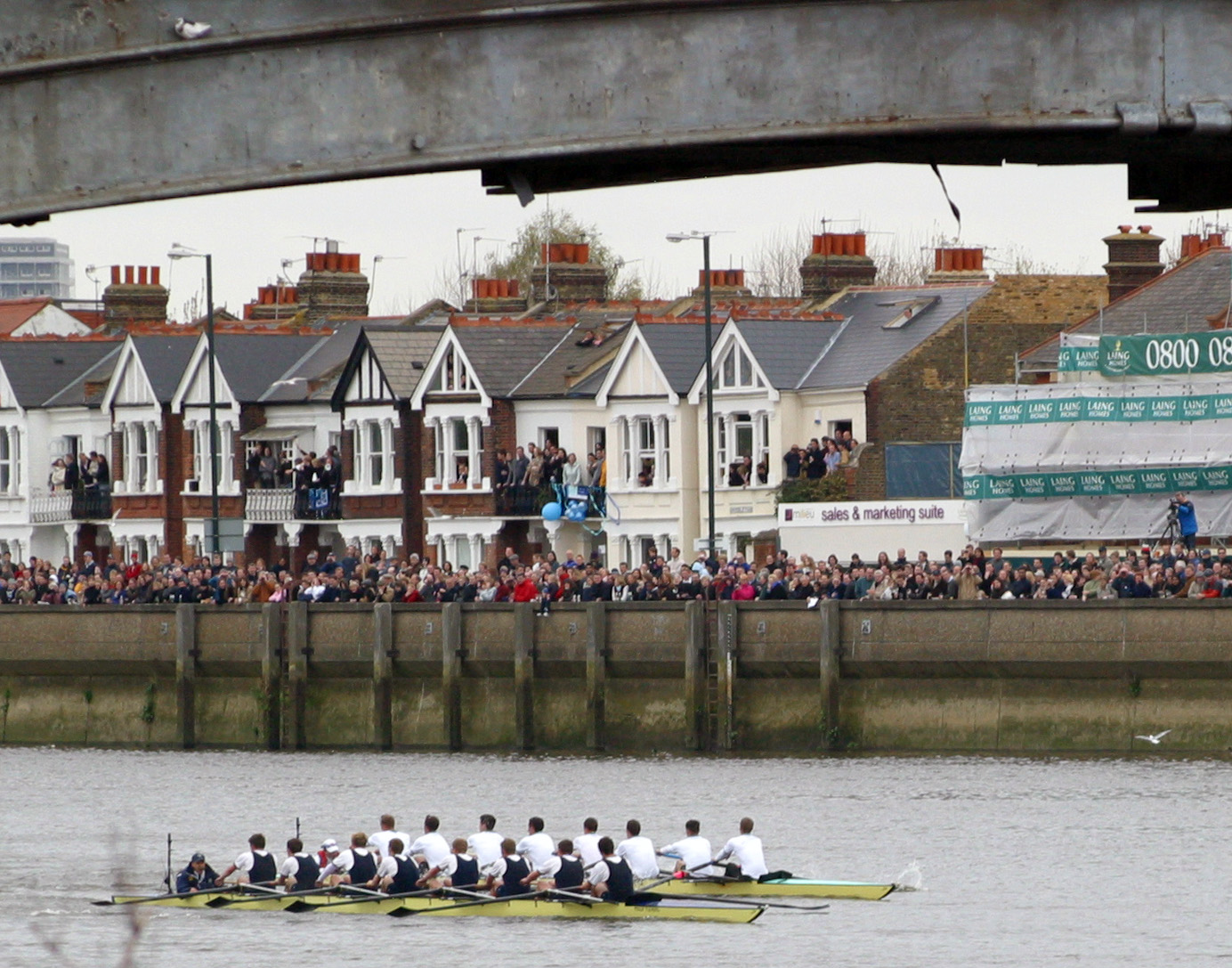
The Oxford boat (rowers in dark blue) holds a narrow lead as the crews approach Barnes Bridge.

Cambridge won the coin toss and the Light Blue boat club president, Tim Wooge, was clear: "Cambridge choose Surrey". Cambridge elected to start from the southern bank (the "Surrey side") of the Thames, handing the northern side of the river (the "Middlesex side") to Oxford. At race time, conditions were overcast and breezy. Oxford took an early lead with a slightly higher stroke rate than Cambridge as both coxes were warned by the umpire to avoid a clash. By the Mile Post, the Dark Blues were half-a-second ahead. Five minutes into the race, Oxford, with a third of a length lead, were warned again by the umpire and moved away from the racing line, and following a series of oar clashes, allowed Cambridge to take the lead, shooting Hammersmith Bridge a second ahead. Oxford continued to stay in touch with Cambridge along the long middle bend of the course, towards the Chiswick Steps, and retook the lead on the approach to Barnes Bridge as the course curved back in their favour. With a three-quarter length lead at Barnes, Oxford began to weaken and Cambridge recovered to a third of a length. With every stroke, the Cambridge boat gained on Oxford, outrating them in a "sprint finish", but the Dark Blues passed the finishing post 1 foot (30 cm) ahead, the narrowest winning margin in the history of the race.

Oxford finished with a time of 18 minutes 6 seconds. Rankov did not initially announce the result, instead he "spread his arms wide and shrugged his shoulders". The result was confirmed to Rankov by finishing judge Ben Kent, with the winning margin being approximately 0.05 seconds, and announced to the crews by Rankov under Chiswick Bridge: "One foot to Oxford". James Livingston wrote of himself at the finish: "eyes widen and bulge in horror. Our desolation is total."

It was the first time a crew had won the race with a deficit of more than one stone (6.4 kg) per man. It was Oxford's third victory in the previous four years and brought the overall result to 77–71 in Cambridge's favour. At the finish, following tradition, the Oxford crew threw their cox, Acer Nethercott, into the water in celebration.

=== Women and reserves races ===
In the reserve race, Cambridge's Goldie beat Oxford's Isis by nine lengths in a time of 18 minutes 4 seconds, two seconds quicker than the Blue boat, recording their fourth consecutive victory and their sixth in seven years. Earlier, Oxford won the 58th women's race in a time of 6 minutes 35 seconds, 3 1/2 lengths ahead of their Light Blue opponents. It was their second consecutive win and took the overall result to 38–20 in Cambridge's favour.

== Reaction ==
It was an astonishing finish to any race, doubly astonishing in a race of such extreme distance; trebly astonishing in a race traditionally regarded as a procession.

— Simon Barnes, writing in The Times

The Oxford University Boat Club president and stroke Matthew Smith said "It feels fantastic and I think it will take a while to top this feeling". He went on to say: "We have got an awesome bunch of guys in this squad ... but I have such respect for Cambridge ... with a lighter crew we've turned round the biggest weight deficit in history." Nethercott remarked "I really thought we had lost. In the space of a few seconds I went from the lowest point in my life to absolute, unbridled ecstasy." The Cambridge oarsman James Livingston said "It was the worst margin to lose by. I just wish I could stop losing these epic races" while the Cambridge coach Williams described the defeat as a "blow to the heart". Wooge was disappointed: "I pull my hat off to Oxford, that was an amazing race." Rankov later revealed "It's the hardest I've ever had to work in an umpiring situation."

The five-time Olympic gold medallist Steve Redgrave, who presented the trophy to the victorious president, Matthew Smith, commented on the race: "Remember that race and cling on to the memory, because it will be the greatest we will see in any of our lifetimes." An estimated 400 million people worldwide watched the event on television, with over 5 million viewers watching on BBC One in the United Kingdom. The race is retold in the book Blood Over Water, authored by opposing brothers James and David Livingston.

Martin Cross, writing in The Guardian, said the race provided "a thrilling finish and renewed interest from the public", Christopher Dodd in The Independent called the race "stupendous, a titanic struggle of will", while Rachel Quarrell of The Daily Telegraph declared Oxford's victory as "epic" and suggested that "there will never be a better Boat Race." Simon Barnes of The Times described the finish: "At the finishing line, the bobble of the Oxford bow was inches in front, a second later, it was inches behind. If the line had come with the completion rather than the beginning of the final Cambridge stroke, the result would have gone the other way." Author and journalist Christopher Dodd, writing in Rowing News summarised the race as "incredible" and a "titanic struggle of wills".
