= The Boat Race 1836 =

2nd Boat Race
- Date: 17 June 1836
- Winner: Cambridge
- Margin of victory: 20 lengths
- Winning time: 36 minutes
- Overall record (Cambridge–Oxford): 1–1
- Umpire: Lord Loftus; Mr Hiceson

The 2nd Boat Race took place on the River Thames on 17 June 1836. It was the first of the University Boat Races to be held in London, on a five-and-three-quarter-mile stretch between Westminster and Putney. For the first time, Cambridge sported light blue livery in the form of a ribbon on their boat while Oxford rowed in dark blue jerseys. In a race umpired by Lord Loftus and Mr Hiceson, Cambridge won the race by 20 lengths to level the overall record at 1–1.

== Background ==
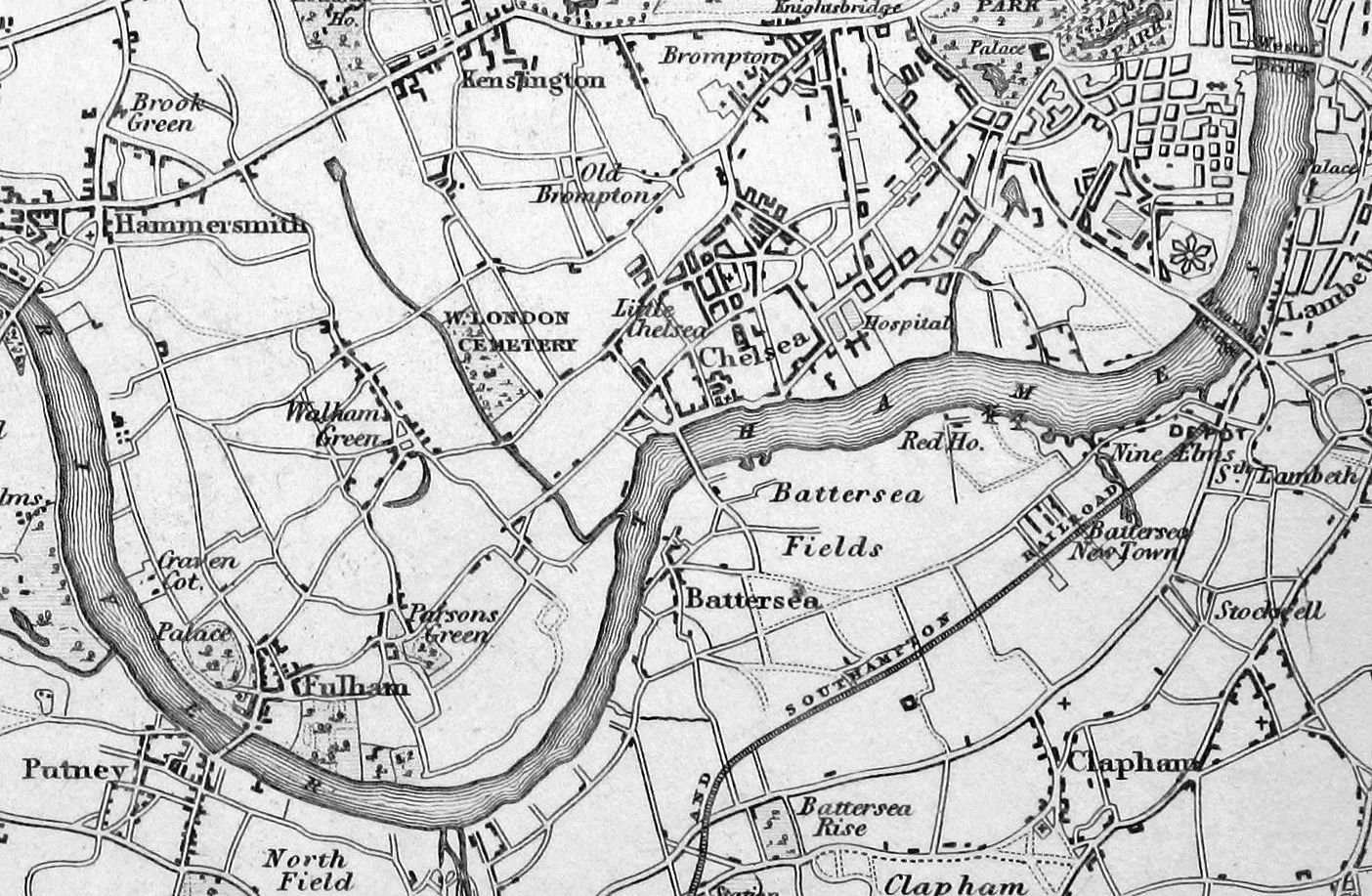
The 1836 race took place between Westminster and Putney bridges.

The Boat Race is an annual rowing eight competition between the University of Oxford and the University of Cambridge. First held in 1829, no attempt was made to organise the second race until 1834. Cambridge had initially proposed a race from Westminster Bridge to Hammersmith, while Oxford suggested Maidenhead. Although Cambridge agreed to compromise to race on any stretch of the Thames between Westminster and Richmond, no agreement was reached until 1836. This year, both universities issued a challenge to one another, and arrangements for the event were made in a meeting at the Star and Garter pub in Putney on 16 June 1836. According to a journalist for The Morning Post, there was disagreement over the length of the race, with Oxford preferring a short course of a mile and a half, while Cambridge opted for the same course as the previous year. It was agreed that the race was to take place the following day along the 5.75-mile (9.3 km) stretch of river between Westminster Bridge and Putney Bridge, a championship course for professional scullers. It was also agreed that both boats would be steered by university men rather than professional coxes.

The second Boat Race in the history of the event, it was the first to be conducted in London, with the inaugural race taking place at Henley-on-Thames. Oxford went into the race as reigning champions, having won the 1829 race "easily". Cambridge were coached by their cox Thomas Selby Egan. The umpires for the race were both Oxonians: Lord Loftus, of Balliol College and Mr Hiceson (or Mr Hickson) of Christ Church.

According to author and former Oxford rower George Drinkwater, this was the first year that Cambridge adopted light blue as their racing colours: an R. N. Phillips provided a strip of Eton blue ribbon "which was fixed to the bows" of the boat. Oxford wore white jerseys with dark blue stripes, as they had done for the 1829 race.

== Crews ==
The Cambridge crew weighed an average of 11 st 8.625 lb (73.6 kg), 0.875 pounds (0.4 kg) per rower more than their opponents. None of the competitors had taken part in a previous Boat Race, while all participants were registered as British. George Carter followed his brother J. Carter who had rowed for Oxford in 1829 race.

Seat	Cambridge			Oxford		
Seat	Name	College	Weight	Name	College	Weight
Bow	William Hammond Solly	1st Trinity	11 st 0 lb	George Carter	St John's	10 st 0 lb
2	Frederick Green	Gonville & Caius	11 st 2 lb	Ferdinand Thomas Stephens	Exeter	10 st 7 lb
3	Edmund Stanley	Jesus	11 st 4 lb	William Baillie	Christ Church	11 st 7 lb
4	Perceval Hartley	Trinity Hall	12 st 0 lb	T. Harris	Magdalen	12 st 4 lb
5	Warren Miller Jones	Gonville & Caius	12 st 0 lb	Justinian Vere Isham	Christ Church	12 st 0 lb
6	John Henry Keane	1st Trinity	12 st 0 lb	John Pennefather	Balliol	12 st 10 lb
7	Arthur Wilson Upcher	2nd Trinity	12 st 0 lb	William S. Thompson	Jesus	13 st 0 lb
Stroke	Augustus Ker Bozzi Granville (P)	Corpus Christi	11 st 7 lb	Frederick Luttrell Moysey (C)	Christ Church	10 st 6 lb
Cox	Thomas Selby Egan	Gonville & Caius	9 st 0 lb	D. T. Davis	Jesus	10 st 3 lb
Source: (P) – boat club president (C) – crew captain (prior to the formation of Oxford University Boat Club)

== Race ==
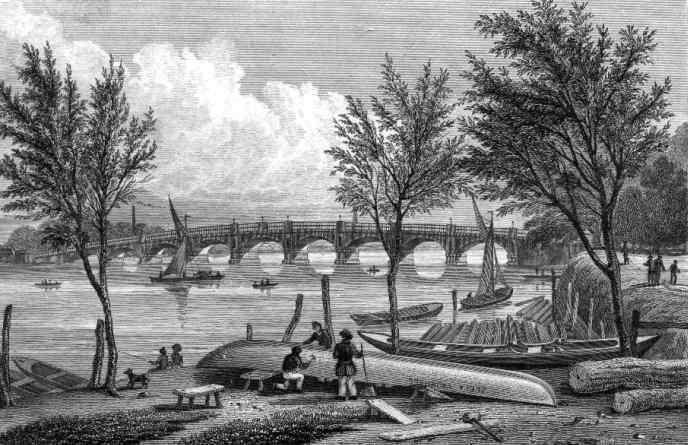
Vauxhall Bridge, by which Cambridge held a substantial lead

Oxford were favourites to win the race; Cambridge won the toss. Heavy rain began to fall two hours before the start of the race, yet "although the rain descended in torrents, all were gay". The race was started by the umpires at 4:20 p.m., with Cambridge starting well, taking an early lead. By Vauxhall Bridge Cambridge's lead was significant. Rowing "gallantly", author and former Light Blue rower William MacMichael noted that Cambridge had the race "all their own way" and passed under Putney Bridge about one minute and 20 lengths ahead of Oxford in a time of around 36 minutes. The victory levelled the series at 1–1.

Sports writer Gordon Ross described the race as "a very hollow affair" in which Cambridge "completely outclassed their rivals". Drinkwater noted that the quality of rowing "was a good deal criticised by the watermen and amateurs of the Tideway". According to the reporter for The Morning Post, "the Oxonians never stood a shadow of a chance, although they looked bigger men". The author of The Sportsman claimed that "Cambridge had the best boat. The one rowed by the Oxonians is too flat-bottomed for the Thames".
