= The Boat Race 2004 =

150th Boat Race
- Date: 28 March 2004
- Winner: Cambridge
- Margin of victory: 6 lengths
- Winning time: 18 minutes 47 seconds
- Overall record (Cambridge–Oxford): 78–71
- Umpire: James Behrens (Cambridge)

Other races
- Reserve winner: Isis
- Women's winner: Oxford

The 150th Boat Race took place on 28 March 2004. Cambridge won by six lengths after a race with several clashes of oars. Oxford's appeal for a re-row upon the conclusion of the race was rejected by umpire James Behrens. The event was sponsored for the final time by Aberdeen Asset Management and broadcast in the United Kingdom by the BBC.

In the reserve race Isis beat Goldie; Oxford also won the Women's Boat Race.

== Background ==
The Boat Race is a side-by-side rowing competition between the University of Oxford and the University of Cambridge. First held in 1829, the competition is a 4.2-mile (6.8 km) race along the Championship Course on the River Thames in southwest London. The rivalry is a major point of honour between the two universities and followed throughout the United Kingdom and worldwide. Oxford went into the race as reigning champions, having won the 2003 race by 1 foot (0.30 m), with Cambridge leading overall with 77 victories to Oxford's 71 (excluding the "dead heat" of 1877). The race was sponsored by Aberdeen Asset Management for the fifth and final time. It was also the BBC's 50th anniversary of live broadcast of the event.

The first Women's Boat Race took place in 1927, but did not become an annual fixture until the 1960s. Until 2014, the contest was conducted as part of the Henley Boat Races, but as of the 2015 race, it is held on the River Thames, on the same day as the men's main and reserve races. The reserve race, contested between Oxford's Isis boat and Cambridge's Goldie boat has been held since 1965. It usually takes place on the Tideway, prior to the main Boat Race.

== Crews ==
The Championship Course along which the crews row during the Boat Race

The Cambridge crew (sometimes referred to as the "Light Blues") weighed an average of 1 pound (0.45 kg) per rower more than their opponents, and had an average age of 24 while Oxford's crew (sometimes referred to as the "Dark Blues") averaged 23. The Oxford crew featured seven Britons and two Americans, while the Cambridge crew consisted of three Britons, a British/American, a German/French, a German, an American and an Australian.

Seat	Cambridge				Oxford			
Seat	Name	College	Nationality	Age	Name	College	Nationality	Age
Bow	Christopher Le Neve Foster	St Catharine's	British	22	Chris Kennelly	Oriel	American	23
2	Kris Coventry	Queen's	Australian	26	Basil Dixon	Pembroke	British	22
3	Hugo Mallinson	St Catherine's	British/American	24	Andrew Stubbs	Hertford	British	23
4	Sebastian Mayer	Caius	German/French	29	Joel Scrogin	Brasenose	American	26
5	Andrew Shannon	St Edmund's	British	24	Peter Reed	Wolfson	British	22
6	Steffen Buschbacher	St Catherine's	German	26	David Livingston	Christ Church	British	20
7	Wayne Pommen	Pembroke	Canadian	24	Henry Morris	Magdalene	British	21
Stroke	Nate Kirk	St Edmund's	American	23	Colin Smith	St Catherine's	British	20
Cox	Kenelm Richardson	Peterhouse	British	19	Acer Nethercott	University	British	26

== Race description ==
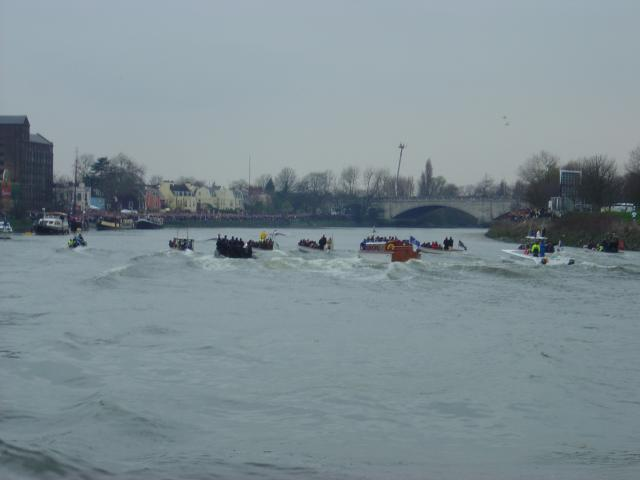
The flotilla following the two University crews towards Chiswick Bridge

Oxford were considered to be pre-race favourites by many. Cambridge won the coin toss and elected to start from the northern bank (the "Middlesex side") of the Thames. Conditions were described as "fairly calm". Oxford made the better start, pulling away to a lead of half a length, but following a number of oar clashes, the Oxford bowman lost his seating, causing his boat to slow. Cambridge took the lead and with clear water behind them, pulled away to win. Cambridge finished with a time of 18 minutes, 47 seconds, Oxford finishing six lengths behind. It was Cambridge's first victory since 2001 and brought the overall result to 78–71 in Cambridge's favour. Oxford's cox Nethercott made an appeal to the umpire but the result stood. At the finish, following tradition, the Cambridge crew threw their cox, Kenelm Richardson, into the water in celebration.

In the reserve race, Oxford's Isis beat Cambridge's Goldie. Earlier at Henley, Oxford won the 59th Women's Boat Race by four lengths.

== Reaction ==
Oxford cox Acer Nethercott said "Our bowman came off his seat and could not continue properly – it was race over after that." Regarding the rejected appeal, he claimed that the umpire "had laid down to both coxes before the race that there was a way he wanted to conduct the race. And then he did something completely different in the race." Kennelly, the bowman, claimed he was "100 per cent confident that if what happened didn't happen we would have won" while Cambridge cox Kenelm Richardson stated "The umpire was very good and told me to hold my line, so I knew I was exactly where I needed to be".
