= The Boat Race 1990 =

136th Boat Race
- Date: 31 March 1990
- Winner: Oxford
- Margin of victory: 2 1/4 lengths
- Winning time: 17 minutes 22 seconds
- Overall record (Cambridge–Oxford): 69–66
- Umpire: Mike Sweeney (Cambridge)

Other races
- Reserve winner: Goldie
- Women's winner: Cambridge

The 136th Boat Race took place on 31 March 1990. Held annually, the Boat Race is a side-by-side rowing race between crews from the Universities of Oxford and Cambridge along the River Thames. Oxford won by 2 1/4 lengths. The race featured the heaviest oarsman ever to have rowed in the event in Oxford's Chris Heathcote, and the lightest Cambridge crew for nearly 30 years.

In the reserve race, Cambridge's Goldie won as Oxford's Isis was disqualified. Cambridge won the Women's Boat Race.

== Background ==
The Boat Race is a side-by-side rowing competition between the University of Oxford (sometimes referred to as the "Dark Blues") and the University of Cambridge (sometimes referred to as the "Light Blues"). First held in 1829, the race takes place on the 4.2-mile (6.8 km) Championship Course on the River Thames in southwest London. The rivalry is a major point of honour between the two universities and followed throughout the United Kingdom and broadcast worldwide. Oxford went into the race as reigning champions, having won the 1989 race by 2 1/2 lengths, with Cambridge leading overall with 69 victories to Oxford's 65 (excluding the "dead heat" of 1877).

The first Women's Boat Race took place in 1927, but did not become an annual fixture until the 1960s. Until 2014, the contest was conducted as part of the Henley Boat Races, but as of the 2015 race, it is held on the River Thames, on the same day as the men's main and reserve races. The reserve race, contested between Oxford's Isis boat and Cambridge's Goldie boat has been held since 1965. It usually takes place on the Tideway, prior to the main Boat Race.

The race was umpired by former Cambridge Blue Mike Sweeney, his fourth appearance in the role. He had advised the coxes that he would not be afraid to disqualify either crew should he need to: "If I warn them, it's irrelevant what their opinion is. If they respond, fine. If not, they're in trouble." The race was sponsored by Beefeater Gin who, prior to the race, had signed a three-year contract to continue their involvement in the race, worth £250,000. The BBC also extended their deal with a new five-year contract to broadcast the race in the United Kingdom.

== Crews ==
The Oxford crew weighed an average of 14 st 12 lb (94.1 kg) per rower, 2 stone 1.5 lb (13.3 kg) more than Cambridge whose crew was the lightest since 1963. The race featured the heaviest oarsman ever to have rowed in the event, with Oxford's Chris Heathcote weighing 17 st 5 lb (114.5 kg). Oxford's crew were also older and more experienced, with three world championship bronze medal winners in Jonathan Searle, Matthew Pinsent and Rupert Obholzer. Three of Oxford's crew had won two Boat Races each, while Cambridge featured two former Blues who had won none. Cambridge's cox Lisa Ross-Magenty had won with both the women's lightweight race in 1987 and Goldie in 1988, her counterpart Martin Watts was educated at Westminster School and "spent hours on the Tideway".

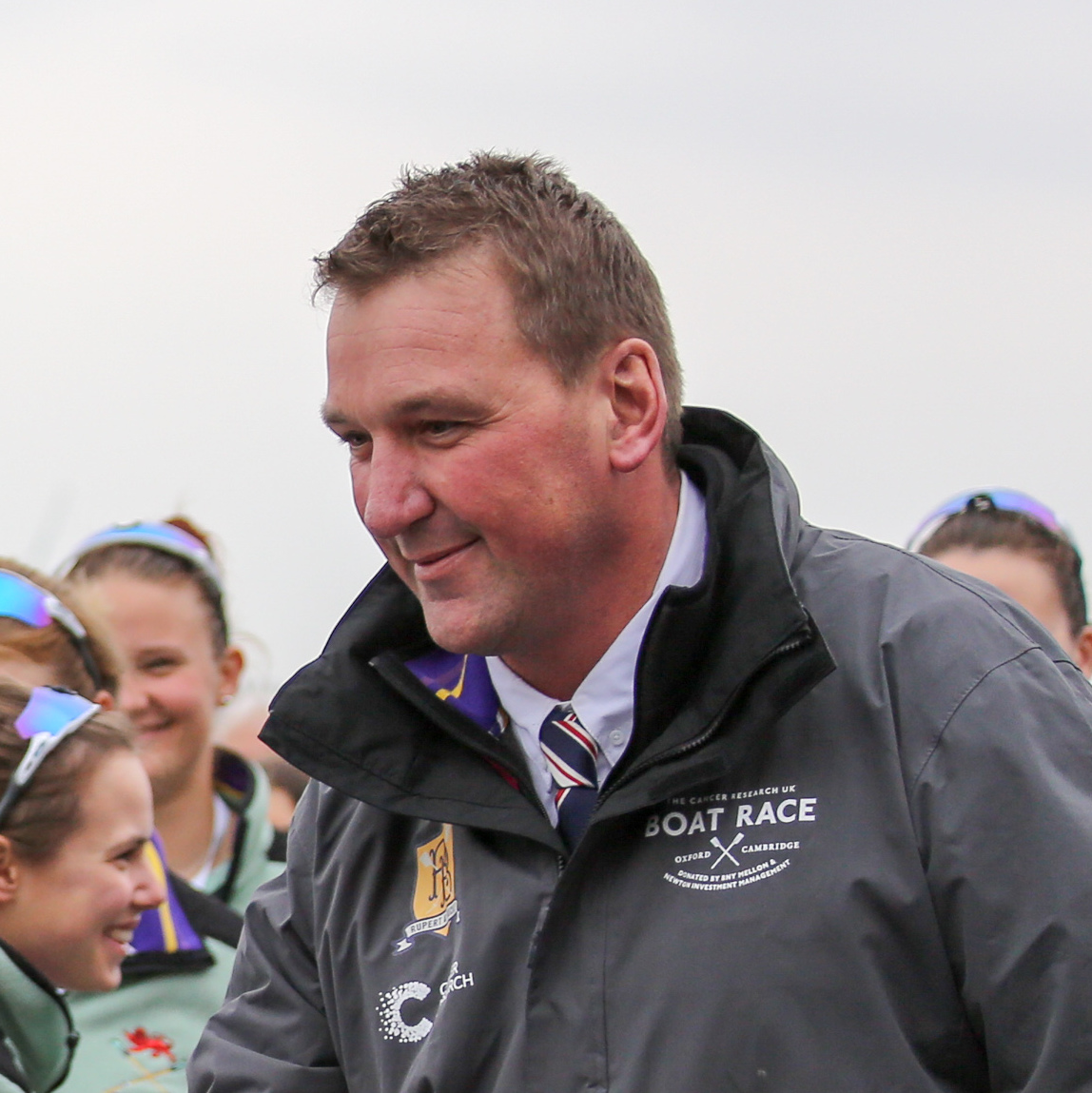
Matthew Pinsent (pictured in 2018) rowed at number 4 for Oxford.

| Seat | Oxford | | | Cambridge | | |
| Seat | Name | College | Weight | Name | College | Weight |
|---|---|---|---|---|---|---|
| Bow | Tom G Slocock | St John's | 14 st 6 lb | Richard C Young | Downing | 12 st 13 lb |
| 2 | Rupert Obholzer | St Catherine's | 13 st 12 lb | Richard J Stalte | St Catharine's | 11 st 3 lb |
| 3 | Don J Miller III | University | 14 st 13 lb | Duncan E Hole | Selwyn | 13 st 3 lb |
| 4 | Matthew Pinsent | St Catherine's | 15 st 7 lb | Ed C Clark | Trinity | 11 st 10 lb |
| 5 | Richard A Hull | Oriel | 13 st 13 lb | Paddy M Mant (P) | Selwyn | 14 st 3 lb |
| 6 | Christopher J Heathcote | Jesus | 17 st 5 lb | Guy Pooley | St John's | 12 st 11 lb |
| 7 | Jonny Searle (P) | Christ Church | 13 st 10 lb | Stephen L Fowler | Robinson | 12 st 12 lb |
| Stroke | Michael P Gaffney | Hertford | 15 st 4 lb | Adam J Wright | Corpus Christi | 13 st 2 lb |
| Cox | Martin W Watts | Oriel | 7 st 9 lb | Lisa Ross-Magenty | New Hall | 7 st 10 lb |
Source: (P) – boat club president

== Races ==
The Championship Course along which the Boat Race is contested

Cambridge were underdogs for the race, having lost all but one of the previous fourteen Boat Races. Cambridge president Paddy Mant won the toss and elected to start from the Surrey station. A minute into the race, Cambridge held a third-of-a-length advantage, but as the crews approached the Fulham bend, Oxford drew alongside. Intelligent coxing from Oxford's Watts gained Oxford a lead of a length after three minutes. With clear water at Harrods Furniture Depository, Watts attempted to steer in front of Cambridge but was warned off by umpire Sweeney. Oxford passed below Hammersmith Bridge holding a four-second advantage and made a push, taking the lead out to six seconds by Chiswick Steps. Settling for a lower rating, Oxford were eight seconds clear by Barnes Railway Bridge, and despite a late surge by Cambridge, Oxford passed the finishing post seven seconds and 2 1/4 lengths ahead. The crews recorded the fourth- and fifth-fastest times in Boat Race history.

In the reserve race, Cambridge's Goldie won as Oxford's Isis were disqualified. After Isis had taken a three-quarter-length lead, a clash of blades resulted in irreparable damage to the Cambridge boat and a red flag from the umpire John Garrett. Cambridge won the 45th Women's Boat Race by 3 1/4 lengths in a time of 7 minutes and 17 seconds, their third victory in four years.

== Reaction ==
Lord Jenkins presented the Beefeater Trophy to winning president Searle. Cambridge coach Mark Lees said of his crew "It was the best they could do." and of Adam Wright, his stroke, who "relentlessly drove Cambridge", he commented: "It was one of the most courageous things I have ever seen". Lees' counterpart, Steve Royle, acknowledged "Cambridge raced very well."
