= The Boat Race 1933 =

85th Boat Race
- Date: 1 April 1933
- Winner: Cambridge
- Margin of victory: 2 1/4 lengths
- Winning time: 20 minutes 57 seconds
- Overall record (Cambridge–Oxford): 44–40
- Umpire: Herbert Aylward Game (Cambridge)

The 85th Boat Race took place on 1 April 1933. Held annually, the Boat Race is a side-by-side rowing race between crews from the Universities of Oxford and Cambridge along the River Thames. Umpired by the former rower Herbert Aylward Game, Cambridge won by 2 1/4 lengths in a time of 20 minutes 57 seconds. The record tenth consecutive victory took the overall record in the event to 44–40 in Cambridge's favour.

== Background ==
The Boat Race is a side-by-side rowing competition between the University of Oxford (sometimes referred to as the "Dark Blues") and the University of Cambridge (sometimes referred to as the "Light Blues"). The race was first held in 1829, and since 1845 has taken place on the 4.2-mile (6.8 km) Championship Course on the River Thames in southwest London. The rivalry is a major point of honour between the two universities; it is followed throughout the United Kingdom and, as of 2014, broadcast worldwide. Cambridge went into the race as reigning champions, having won the 1932 race by five lengths, and led overall with 43 victories to Oxford's 40 (excluding the "dead heat" of 1877).

Cambridge were coached by Francis Escombe, Harold Rickett (who rowed three times between 1930 and 1932), and Peter Haig-Thomas (four-time Blue for Cambridge between 1902 and 1905). Oxford's coaches were John Houghton Gibbon (who had participated in the 1899 and 1900 races, and umpired the 1931 race), P. Johnson (who had rowed for Oxford in the 1927 race), A. E. Kitchin (who had rowed in the 1908 race) and W. P. Mellen (who was a Dark Blue in 1923 and 1924 races). The race was umpired by former Cambridge rower Herbert Aylward Game who had represented the Light Blues in the 1895 and 1896 races.

According to the rowing correspondent for The Times, "no training in recent years has seen more changes in the comparative merits of the two crews." Oxford started well while Cambridge took time to settle, but having done so "made astonishingly rapid progress" and "promised to be the best Cambridge crew since 1900." Oxford improved further once they had arrived at Putney; conversely the Light Blues suffered misfortune in losing Lewis Luxton, last year's stroke ten days before the race. The Dark Blues continued to progress but by the time of the race, "there was very little to choose between the two crews."

== Crews ==
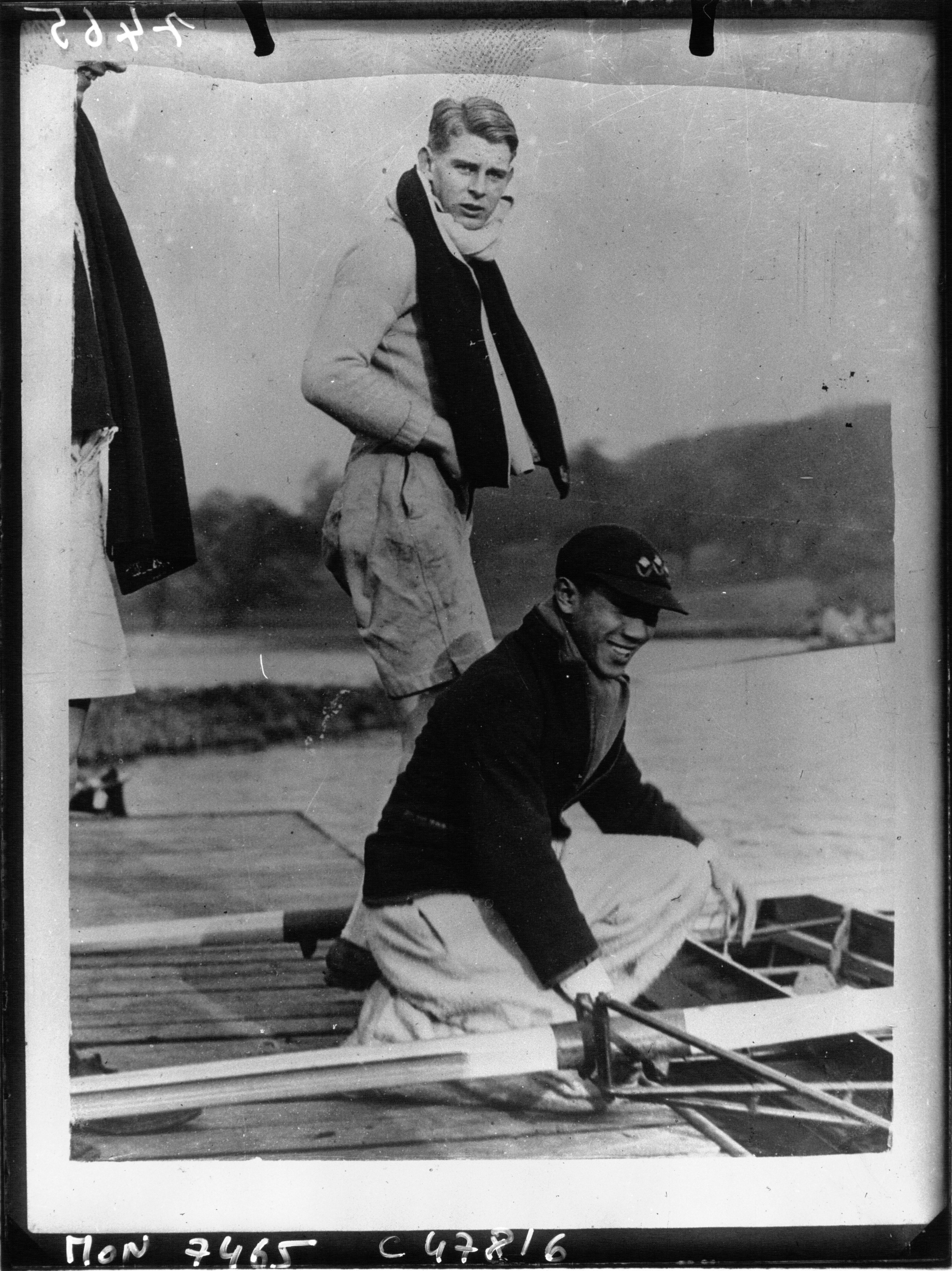
Chaloke Komarakul-Na-Nagara (with hat)

The Oxford crew weighed an average of 12 st 6.125 lb (78.8 kg), 1.125 pounds (0.5 kg) per rower more than their opponents. Cambridge saw three rowers return to the crew with Boat Race experience, including number five Charles Sergel who was making his third consecutive appearance. Oxford's crew also contained three rowers who had taken part in previous events, including W. D. C. Erskine-Crumb, appearing in his third consecutive race. Two participants were registered as non-British: Oxford cox C. Komarakul-Na-Nagara was from Thailand, while Cambridge's William Sambell was Australian.

Seat	Oxford			Cambridge		
Seat	Name	College	Weight	Name	College	Weight
Bow	W. H. Migotti	Worcester	11 st 11.5 lb	W. L. R. Carbonell	St Catharine's	12 st 4.5 lb
2	M. H. Mosley	Trinity	12 st 0.25 lb	J. E. Gilmour	Trinity Hall	12 st 0.5 lb
3	W. D. C. Erskine-Crum (P)	Christ Church	12 st 9.5 lb	T. G. Askwith	Peterhouse	12 st 0.5 lb
4	J. M. Couchman	Christ Church	12 st 9 lb	R. B. F. Wylie	Clare	12 st 10 lb
5	P. Hogg	New College	12 st 9 lb	C. J. S. Sergel (P)	Clare	12 st 10 lb
6	P. R. S. Bankes	Christ Church	13 st 3 lb	W. A. T. Sambell	Pembroke	12 st 5 lb
7	G. A. Ellison	New College	11 st 12.5 lb	C. M. Fletcher	3rd Trinity	12 st 9.5 lb
Stroke	R. W. G. Holdsworth	Brasenose	11 st 13.25 lb	T. Frame-Thomson	3rd Trinity	12 st 0 lb
Cox	C. Komarakul-Na-Nagara	Magdalen	8 st 4.5 lb	R. N. Wheeler	Sidney Sussex	7 st 12 lb
Source: (P) – boat club president

== Race ==
The Championship Course along which the Boat Race is contested

Cambridge won the toss and elected to start from the Surrey station, handing the Middlesex side of the river to Oxford. The race was delayed as a result of the slowly rising tide and it was eventually started by umpire Game at 4:02 p.m. Cambridge made the quicker start and out-rated their opponents to hold a quarter-length lead by the end of the Fulham Wall. With the bend in the river favouring the Middlesex station, Oxford gained and the crews passed the Mile Post level. Despite a spurt from Cambridge's stroke Frame-Thomson, Oxford took the lead and responded to the push with one of their own. Another spurt, this time minute-long, from the Light Blues, saw them pass below Hammersmith Bridge with a one third length advantage.

Making the most of the inside of the bend in the river, Cambridge pushed on to be a length clear by The Doves pub. As both crews rowed into Chiswick Reach, they were struck by the headwind and by Chiswick Steps, the Light Blues had extended their lead by half a length, rating two strokes per minute more than Oxford. By the time they passed below Barnes Bridge, Cambridge were seven seconds ahead. They passed the finishing post with a lead of two and a quarter lengths in a time of 20 minutes 57 seconds, taking the overall record in the event to 44–40 in their favour. It was the Light Blues' tenth consecutive victory, a record streak in the history of the event. It was the slowest winning time since the 1925 race and the narrowest margin of victory since the 1930 race. Writing in The Observer, William Beach Thomas declared that "a good crew was beaten by a good crew after one of the finest races in the long chronicles". According to the former Oxford rower E. P. Evans, "the features of the race were the superb stroking of the Oxford crew by Holdsworth and the extremely bad coxing of the Cambridge boat ... although Cambridge won, they were not really at their best."
