= Joseph von Maltzahn =

British rower and Boat Race winner (born 1978)

Joseph von Maltzahn (born 2 August 1978 in Oxford, Oxfordshire) is a British rower and Boat Race winner.

== Education ==
Maltzahn was educated at Eton College where he took up the sport of rowing, Oxford Brookes University and Kellogg College, Oxford where he studied Architectural History.

== The Boat Race ==
Whilst at Oxford University, Maltzahn was a member of Oxford University Boat Club and took part in the Boat Race in 2005. Both universities had extremely strong intakes that year, with Cambridge boasting several world champions and the Oxford crew including Olympic silver medallist Barney Williams. Oxford, with Maltzahn at four, won the epic contest by 2 lengths in a time of 16 minutes 42 minutes.

== International Rowing career ==
Maltzahn won his first senior international vest in 2001. He sat in the four seat of the Great Britain Eight, which finished fifth in the final of the Rowing World Championships in Lucerne. He stroked the Eight in 2002 at the championships in Seville.

== Achievements ==
=== World Championships ===
- 2002 Seville – 6th, Eight (stroke)
- 2001 Lucerne – 5th, Eight (four)

=== World Cups ===
- 2003 Munich – 8th, 2nd Coxless Four (two)
- 2002 Munich – 6th, Eight (stroke)
- 2002 Lucerne – 5th, Eight (two)
- 2002 Hazewinkel – 4th, Eight (two)
- 2002 Lucerne – 5th, Eight (four)
- 2002 Munich – 3rd, Eight (two)
- 2002 Seville – 7th, 2nd coxless four (stroke)

== Other Rowing ==
Having taken time out from international rowing, Maltzahn took part in Oxford's inter-collegiate Eights Week competition. As Kellogg College does not have its own boat club, Maltzahn was able to choose which college he wished to row for, and asked the Oxford University Rowing Clubs (OURCs) to grant him membership of the Christ Church Boat Club – for whom his Oxford and Great Britain crewmate Robin Bourne-Taylor competed. In 2005, with Maltzahn in the stroke seat, Christ Church Men's 1st VIII won blades. Subsequently the OURCs have agreed that all members of Kellogg College are automatically eligible to row for Christ Church.
