= The Boat Race 1963 =

109th Boat Race
- Date: 23 March 1963
- Winner: Oxford
- Margin of victory: 5 lengths
- Winning time: 20 minutes 47 seconds
- Overall record (Cambridge–Oxford): 60–48
- Umpire: G. A. Ellison (Oxford)

The 109th Boat Race took place on 23 March 1963. Held annually, the event is a side-by-side rowing race between crews from the Universities of Oxford and Cambridge along the River Thames. The race, umpired by Gerald Ellison, the Bishop of Chester, was won by Oxford with a winning margin of five lengths.

== Background ==
The Boat Race is a side-by-side rowing competition between the University of Oxford (sometimes referred to as the "Dark Blues") and the University of Cambridge (sometimes referred to as the "Light Blues"). The race was first held in 1829, and since 1845 has taken place on the 4.2-mile (6.8 km) Championship Course on the River Thames in southwest London. The rivalry is a major point of honour between the two universities, followed throughout the United Kingdom and broadcast worldwide. Cambridge went into the race as reigning champions, having won the previous year's race by five lengths, and led overall in the event with 60 victories to Oxford's 47 (excluding the "dead heat" of 1877).

Cambridge's coaches were Harry Almond (who rowed for Cambridge in the 1950 and 1951 races), Tony Butcher (who rowed in the 1947 race for Cambridge), David Jennens (who rowed three times between 1949 and 1951) and Brian Lloyd (who also rowed three times from 1949 to 1951). Oxford were coached by R. M. A. Bourne (who represented Oxford in the 1946 and 1947 races), Ronnie Howard (who rowed twice, in the 1957 and 1959 races), Mike Nicholson (the non-rowing boat club president of Cambridge in 1947), Antony Rowe (who had rowed in the 1948 and 1949 races) and E. R. Spencer. During practice rows at Putney, Cambridge experienced a number of "crabs" and while the crew demonstrated a "nervous disability to cope with rough water", they had the quicker start.

The race was umpired by Gerald Ellison, Bishop of Chester, who had rowed for Oxford in the 1932 and 1933 races.

== Crews ==
The Oxford crew weighed an average of 13 st 0.125 lb (82.4 kg), over 5.5 pounds (2.5 kg) per rower more than their opponents. Cambridge's crew contained just a single rower with Boat Race experience in the boat club president and stroke Lord Chewton, while Oxford saw Richard Morton, David Skailes and cox Christopher Strong return. Four rowers, two from each university, were registered as overseas participants in the race: Oxford's Philip Roff was Australian while D. Spencer was American, and Cambridge's B. Jackson was South African while John Maasland hailed from the Netherlands. Oxford's boat club president Toby Tennant had removed himself from the crew two weeks prior to the race as a result of a lack of form.

A correspondent for The Times noted that although there "has never been the slightest possibility" that the Cambridge crew would be of "really first rate", the hard work had produced a "presentable University crew". Meanwhile, although Oxford had "no stars" and had arrived at Putney as an "unusually backward crew", progress during practice made for definite improvement.

| Seat | Oxford | | | Cambridge | | |
| Seat | Name | College | Weight | Name | College | Weight |
|---|---|---|---|---|---|---|
| Bow | S. R. Morris | St Edmund | 11 st 11 lb | P. J. Webb | Queens' | 11 st 0 lb |
| 2 | N. V. Bevan | Balliol | 12 st 11 lb | M. V. Bevan | Downing | 12 st 9.5 lb |
| 3 | R. A. Morton-Maskell | Keble | 13 st 9 lb | A. V. Cooke | Jesus | 12 st 13.5 lb |
| 4 | M. Q. Morland | Lincoln | 13 st 7 lb | B. J. R. Jackson | Clare | 12 st 7.5 lb |
| 5 | R. C. T. Mead | Keble | 13 st 7 lb | J. Maasland | Queens' | 14 st 1.5 lb |
| 6 | D. D. S. Skailes | Keble | 13 st 6 lb | M. H. Beckett | Queens' | 13 st 0.5 lb |
| 7 | P. A. V. Roff | New College | 12 st 9 lb | D. F. Legget | Trinity Hall | 12 st 6 lb |
| Stroke | D. C. Spencer | Christ Church | 12 st 11 lb | Lord Chewton (P) | 1st & 3rd Trinity | 10 st 12 lb |
| Cox | C. M. Strong | Keble | 8 st 13 lb | F. G. G. de Rancourt | 1st & 3rd Trinity | 9 st 0 lb |
Source: (P) – Boat club president (Toby Tennant was Oxford's non-rowing president)

== Race ==
The Championship Course along which the Boat Race is contested

Oxford won the toss and elected to start from the Surrey station, handing the Middlesex side of the river to Cambridge. The race commenced at 11.30 a.m. in a "fresh north-north-westerly wind". As had been anticipated, Cambridge took an early lead and were three-quarters of a length ahead after the first minute of the race. Continuing at a higher stroke rate than Oxford in the second minute, the Light Blues were almost clear by the end of the Fulham Wall. Still nearly a length behind by the Mile Post, Oxford cox Strong began to steer towards Cambridge, forcing them towards the centre of the river, narrowly avoiding a warning from the umpire.

Level by Harrods Furniture Depository, Oxford were half a length up by Hammersmith Bridge, increasing to over a length by The Doves pub, despite an "almost despairing spurt" from Cambridge. The lead was three and a half lengths by Chiswick Steps and four and a half by Barnes Bridge. Oxford won by five lengths in a time of 20 minutes 47 seconds, the slowest time since the 1951 race. It was the Dark Blues' first victory in three years and took the overall record to 60–48 in Cambridge's favour.
