= The Boat Race 1925 =

77th Boat Race
- Date: 28 March 1925
- Winner: Cambridge
- Margin of victory: Oxford waterlogged
- Winning time: 21 minutes 50 seconds
- Overall record (Cambridge–Oxford): 36–40
- Umpire: Frederick I. Pitman (Cambridge)

The 77th Boat Race took place on 28 March 1925. Held annually, the Boat Race is a side-by-side rowing race between crews from the Universities of Oxford and Cambridge along the River Thames. Umpired by former rower Frederick I. Pitman, Cambridge won in a time of 21 minutes 50 seconds after Oxford became waterlogged and were unable to finish the race. The victory took the overall record in the event to 40–36 in Oxford's favour.

== Background ==
The Boat Race is a side-by-side rowing competition between the University of Oxford (sometimes referred to as the "Dark Blues") and the University of Cambridge (sometimes referred to as the "Light Blues"). The race was first held in 1829, and since 1845 has taken place on the 4.2-mile (6.8 km) Championship Course on the River Thames in southwest London. The rivalry is a major point of honour between the two universities and followed throughout the United Kingdom and worldwide. Cambridge went into the race as reigning champions, having won the 1924 race by 4 1/2 lengths, while Oxford led overall with 40 victories to Cambridge's 35 (excluding the "dead heat" of 1877).

Oxford were coached by G. C. Bourne, who had rowed for the university in the 1882 and 1883 races, Stanley Garton (who had rowed three times between 1909 and 1911) and E. D. Horsfall (who had rowed in the three races prior to the First World War). Cambridge's coaches were Francis Escombe, P. Haig-Thomas (four-time Blue who had rowed between 1902 and 1905), Sir Henry Howard (coach of the Lady Margaret Boat Club) and David Alexander Wauchope (who had rowed in the 1895 race). For the seventeenth year the umpire was Old Etonian Frederick I. Pitman, who had rowed for Cambridge in the 1884, 1885 and 1886 races.

As a result of various illnesses, the Oxford crew was not finalised until five days before the race, and according to former Dark Blue rower and author George Drinkwater, "the innumerable changes prevented the crew from ever really getting together". Drinkwater also stated that the Oxford boat rowed with "three unfit men in the boat". Similarly, Cambridge were affected by illness, in particular the boat club president Robert Morrison, who was forced to leave the crew.

== Crews ==
The Oxford crew weighed an average of 12 st 0.875 lb (78.5 kg), 0.375 pounds (0.2 kg) per rower more than their opponents. Cambridge's crew included six participants with Boat Race experience, all of whom had made their first appearance in the event the previous year. Oxford saw three rowers return to the boat, including G. J. Mower-White who was rowing in his third consecutive race. All of the participants in the race were registered as British.

Seat	Oxford			Cambridge		
Seat	Name	College	Weight	Name	College	Weight
Bow	A. H. Franklin	Lincoln	11 st 9.5 lb	G. E. G. Goddard	Jesus	11 st 2 lb
2	C. E. Pitman	Christ Church	11 st 7 lb	W. F. Smith	1st Trinity	11 st 7 lb
3	E. C. T. Edwards	Christ Church	12 st 3.5 lb	H. R. Carver	3rd Trinity	12 st 13 lb
4	M. R. Grant	Christ Church	11 st 8 lb	J. S. Herbert	King's	11 st 9 lb
5	G. J. Mower-White (P)	Brasenose	13 st 4 lb	G. H. Ambler	Clare	12 st 7 lb
6	J. D. W. Thomson	University	12 st 10 lb	G. L. Elliot-Smith	Lady Margaret Boat Club	13 st 4 lb
7	G. E. G. Gadsden	Christ Church	11 st 12 lb	S. K. Tubbs	Gonville and Caius	11 st 12 lb
Stroke	A. V. Campbell	Christ Church	11 st 9 lb	A. G. Wansbrough	King's	11 st 7 lb
Cox	R. Knox	Balliol	8 st 2 lb	J. A. Brown	Gonville and Caius	7 st 13 lb
Source: (P) – boat club president R. E. Morrison acted as the non-rowing president for Cambridge

== Race ==
The Championship Course along which the Boat Race is contested

Cambridge won the toss and elected to start from the Middlesex station, handing the Surrey side of the river to Oxford. Pitman got the race underway at 3:41 p.m. in a strong wind diagonally across the start which made the Surrey virtually unnavigable, and within a minute of the start, the Dark Blues' boat was waterlogged. Cambridge enjoyed the shelter of the Middlesex wall and rapidly went away. Despite being advised to stop by their coach Garton, it was not until The Doves pub that Oxford retired. Cambridge slowed to a "strong paddle" and passed the finishing post in a time of 21 minutes 50 seconds.

It was the slowest winning time since the 1912 race, and the third time in the history of the event that one or both of the crews sank (in the 1859 and 1912 races). According to author and former Oxford rower George Drinkwater, the race was "a complete 'washout' in the literal sense of the word". Following the race, Pitman was heavily criticised for his placement of the stake boats; Drinkwater disagreed, noting that "when the stake boats were being placed ... the water was possible for both boats." Indeed, prior to the race he had followed the requests of both boat club presidents to move the boats closer to the Middlesex station but did not want to give an inappropriate advantage to the crew starting from that side of the river. In a letter from Pitman, published in The Field, he wrote that "I hope that the umpire may be relieved from the duty of fixing the course, or that he may have the assistance of a representative of both Universities on his launch in fixing the stake boats and deciding whether the race can be rowed."
