= Rupert Obholzer =

British rower

Medal record

Men's rowing

Representing Great Britain

Olympic Games
| Bronze medal – third place | 1996 Atlanta | Coxless four |

World Rowing Championships
| Silver medal – second place | 1995 Tampere | Coxless four |
| Bronze medal – third place | 1989 Bled | Eight |
| Bronze medal – third place | 1994 Indianapolis | Coxless four |

Rupert Obholzer (born 27 March 1970 in Cape Town) is a British rower. He was educated at Hampton School along with Johnny and Greg Searle and then St Catherine's College, Oxford, where he stroked the dark blue boat to victory in the 1991 Boat Race. He won a bronze medal at the 1996 Olympic Games in the four with Jonny Searle, Greg Searle and Tim Foster. He was later umpire of the Oxford and Cambridge Boat Race. He trained as a doctor while rowing, and is now a consultant ear nose and throat surgeon at Guy's Hospital specialising in diseases of the ear and base of the skull.
