= Robin Bourne-Taylor =

British Army officer and rower

Robin Bourne-Taylor CGC
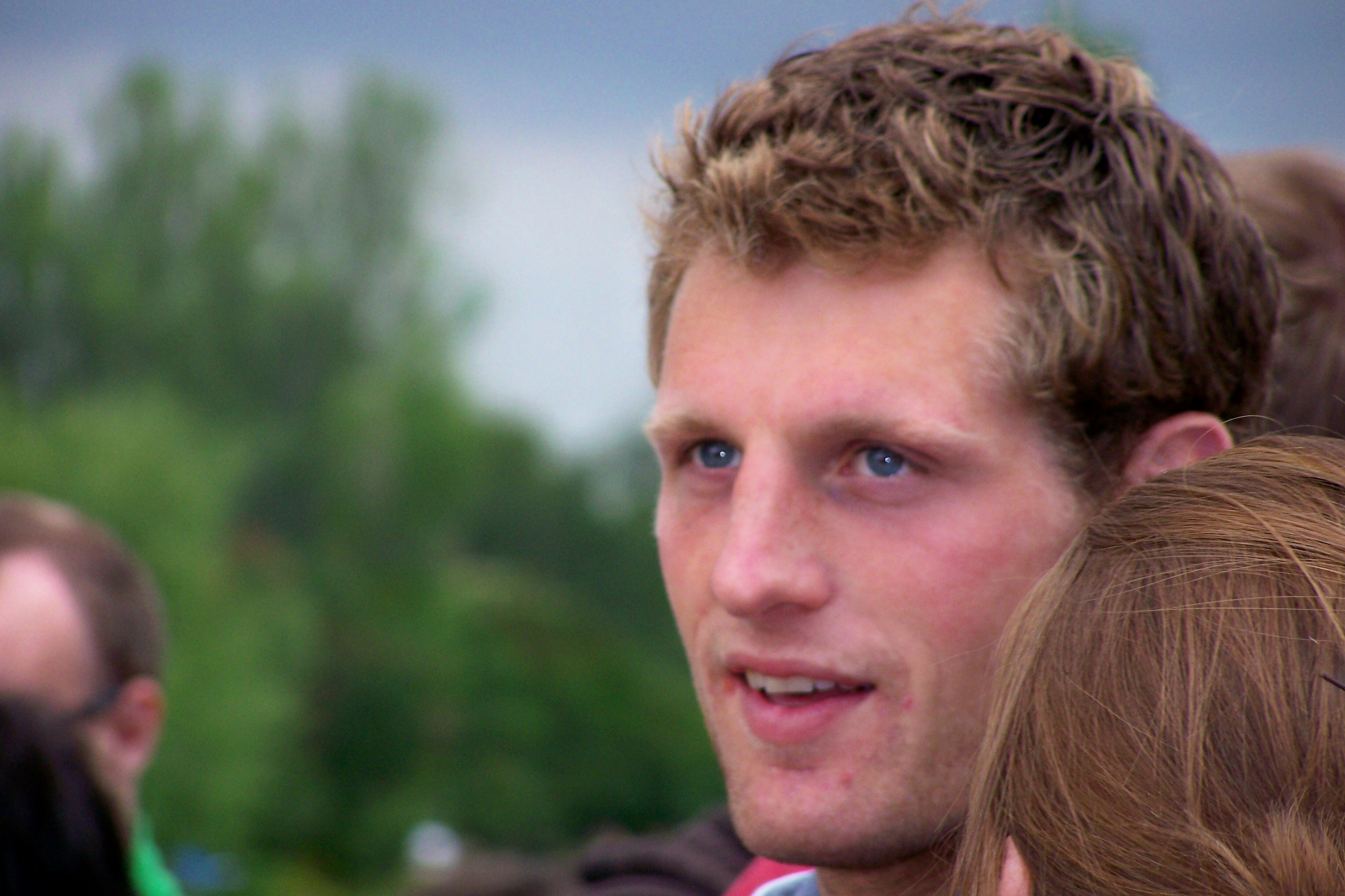
- Bourne-Taylor in 2007

Personal information
- Born: 22 July 1981 (age 45) George Town, Grand Cayman
- Spouse: Hannah (~2015-present)
Medal record
Men's rowing
Representing Great Britain
World Championships
Bronze medal – third place	2003 Milan	Men's Eight
Bronze medal – third place	2007 Munich	Men's Eight

Robin Edwin Geoffrey Bourne-Taylor, CGC (born 22 July 1981) is a former British officer and sportsman. He is a three times Boat Race winner, and for his service in Afghanistan he was awarded the Conspicuous Gallantry Cross.

== Education ==
Bourne-Taylor was educated at Abingdon School (where he rowed for the Abingdon School Boat Club) and then Christ Church, Oxford (2000–2005) where he read engineering.

== Rowing career ==
=== The Boat Race ===
While at the University of Oxford, Bourne-Taylor was a member of Oxford University Boat Club and took part in the Boat Race four times in five years between 2001 and 2005 (taking a year off to train for the 2004 Summer Olympics). He was elected president of the Oxford University Boat Club for the 2004–05 academic year.

2001: Bow – Lost
2002: Seven – Won
2003: Five – Won
2005: Bow – Won

Bourne-Taylor's time at Oxford coincided with some of the most controversial and exciting Boat Races in recent memory. The 2001 race, in which he took part as a "fresher", caused controversy when the two crews were restarted level when the Cambridge bowman lost his blade on the wake thrown up by an Oxford oarsman, when Oxford were half a length up. Following the restart Cambridge went on to win by 2 1/2 lengths.

A year later Oxford gained revenge by coming from behind to win, after a Cambridge oarsman – Sebastian Mayer – appeared to collapse in the closing moments. It was the first time in fifty years that the crew behind at Barnes Bridge had gone onto win the race.

The 2003 race offered another thrilling finish, as Oxford won the 4 1/4 mile race by just a foot. For the first time in history two sets of brothers competed against each other. David Livingston (Oxford) raced against his older brother James, and a last minute call up for Ben Smith (who joined the Cambridge Blue Boat from Goldie hours before the race after the original crew member was injured) meant that he competed against his brother Matthew, the Oxford president.

Having concentrated his efforts on the Olympics in 2004, Bourne-Taylor returned to Oxford for one final race, this time as President of the Oxford University Boat Club. Both universities had extremely strong intakes that year, with Cambridge boasting several world champions and the Oxford crew including Olympic silver medallist Barney Williams. Oxford won the epic contest by 2 lengths in a time of 16 minutes 42 seconds.

=== International rowing ===
Having won a silver medal at the 1999 World Rowing Junior Championships, Bourne-Taylor won his first senior international vest in 2002. He sat in the seven seat of the Great Britain Eight, which made the final of the World Rowing Championships in Seville. He occupied the same seat a year later when the Eight won a bronze medal at the championships in Milan.

Following this success, Bourne-Taylor decided that training for the Olympics and finishing his engineering degree were incompatible. He took a year off from his studies at Oxford, and trained with the Leander Club in Henley-on-Thames. The buildup to the Olympics for the GB Men's Rowing Squad was somewhat disrupted due to illness, injury and variable form. Illness to the Eight's stroke – Thomas James – the night before their Heat in the Olympic competition was a particular blow, and while James returned for the repechage, the crew failed to make the final.

Bourne-Taylor did not represent Great Britain in 2005 and 2006, choosing to concentrate on finishing his degree and dedicate himself to a career in the British Army. He returned to the international scene in 2007, rejoining the Eight, sitting in the seven seat, and winning a bronze medal at the world championships in Munich. Bourne-Taylor then spent most of 2008 in the Eight. However, late changes saw him move into the Coxless Pair with Tom Solesbury. The pair had only a few weeks to train together, and finished a disappointing 13th at the Olympics in Beijing.

=== Other rowing ===
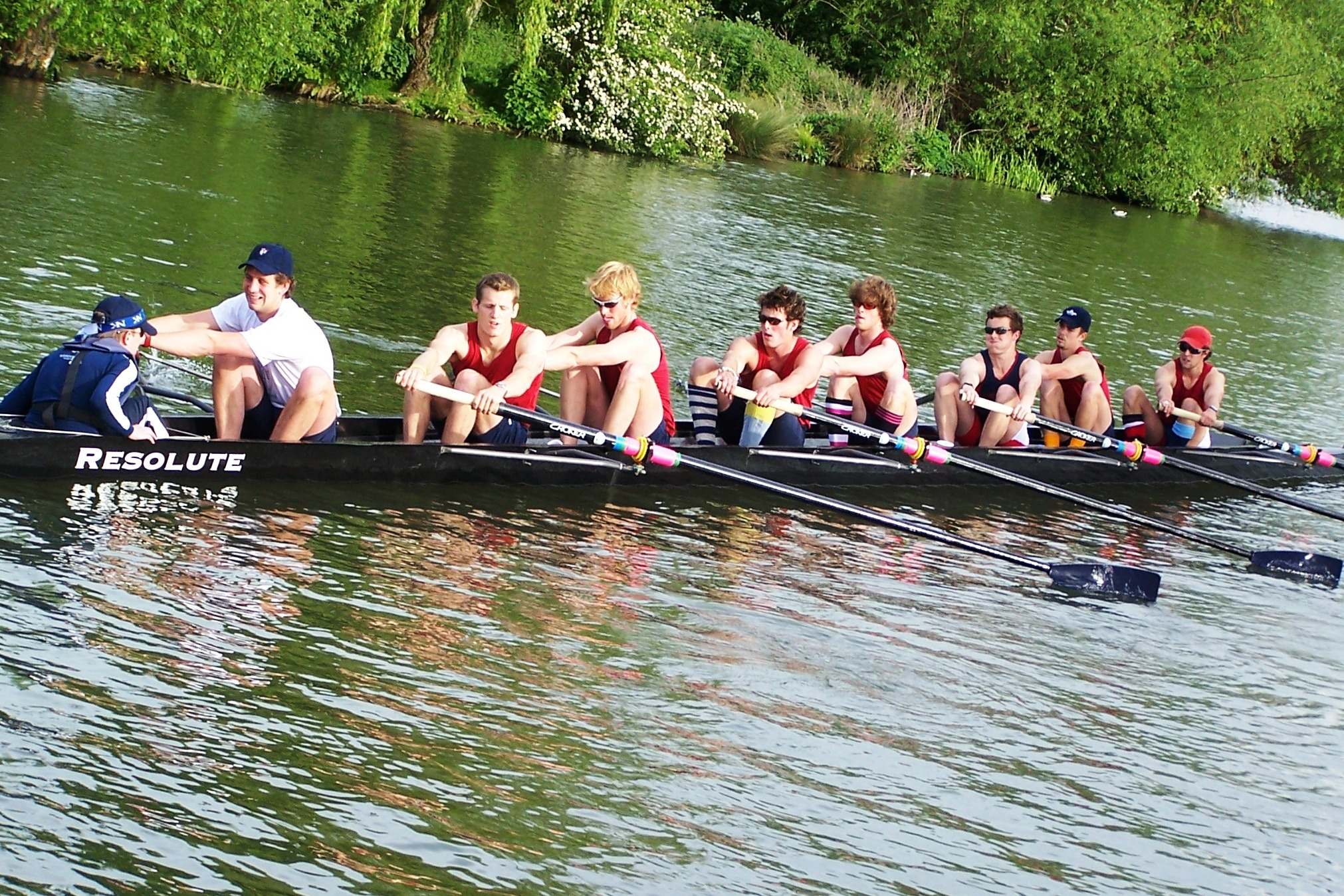
Christ Church Men's 1st VIII 2005 with Bourne-Taylor at 7

Despite rowing for both Oxford University Boat Club and Great Britain, Bourne-Taylor still found time to compete for Christ Church Boat Club in the annual Eights Week competition. In 2001, Christ Church Men's 1st VIII, with Bourne-Taylor in the stroke seat, bumped St. Edmund Hall, Jesus College, New College, and Magdalen College, on successive days to move from ninth to fifth on the river, and win blades for the first time in over 80 years. Four years later, Bourne-Taylor was the only surviving crew member, when the 1st VIII repeated that achievement, again moving from ninth to fifth, but this time bumping Hertford College, St. Edmund Hall, New College and Exeter College.

In 2006, Bourne-Taylor competed in the Army crew that reached the semi-final of the Visitors' Challenge Cup at Henley Royal Regatta, steering the Army crew from the three-seat. In the semi-final he raced against fellow Christ Church graduate, Jonny Searle. Perhaps surprisingly, youth failed to beat experience, and despite having a useful lead for the majority of the race, the Army succumbed to a 'Searle finish' c1992 Barcelona.

== Military career ==
Robin Edwin Geoffrey Bourne-Taylor
- Born: 22 July 1981
- Military career
- Allegiance: United Kingdom
- Branch: British Army
- Service years: 2003–2011
- Rank: Captain
- Service number: 565224
- Awards: Conspicuous Gallantry Cross

Bourne-Taylor was commissioned into the Life Guards, after the 44-week commissioning course at the Royal Military Academy Sandhurst, as a Second Lieutenant on 12 August 2006 with seniority from 9 February 2003. He was promoted on the same day to Lieutenant with seniority from 9 February 2005. He was promoted to captain on 12 February 2009.

His girlfriend Second Lieutenant Jo Dyer was killed by an improvised explosive device in Basra on Thursday, 5 April 2007. His first operational posting was to Afghanistan on 1 October 2009. He was awarded the Conspicuous Gallantry Cross in the Operational Honours And Awards List of 24 September 2010, "for gallant and distinguished services in Afghanistan during the period 1 October 2009 to 31 March 2010". He left the army in the summer of 2010 and was transferred to the Regular Army Reserve of Officers on 1 January 2011 thereby officially ending his army career.

== Personal ==
Bourne-Taylor is married to wildlife advocate and author, Hannah.

== Achievements in rowing ==
=== Olympics ===
- 2008 Beijing – 13th, Coxless Pair (bow)
- 2004 Athens – 9th, Eight (seven)

=== World Championships ===
- 2007 Munich – Bronze, Eight (seven)
- 2003 Milan – Bronze, Eight (seven)
- 2002 Seville – 6th, Eight (seven)

=== World Cups ===
- 2008 Lucerne – Bronze, Eight (seven)
- 2008 Munich – Silver, Eight (seven)
- 2007 Amsterdam – Bronze, Eight (seven)
- 2007 Linz – 5th, Eight (seven)
- 2004 Munich – 4th, Eight (bow)
- 2004 Poznań – 5th, Eight (seven)
- 2003 Milan – Bronze, Eight (seven)
- 2003 Lucerne – Gold, Eight (seven)
- 2003 Munich – Bronze, Eight (seven)
- 2002 Munich – 6th, Eight (seven)
- 2002 Lucerne – 11th, Eight (seven)
- 2002 Hazewinkel – 7th, Eight (seven)

== See also ==
- List of Old Abingdonians
