= Boris Rankov =

British historian (born 1954)

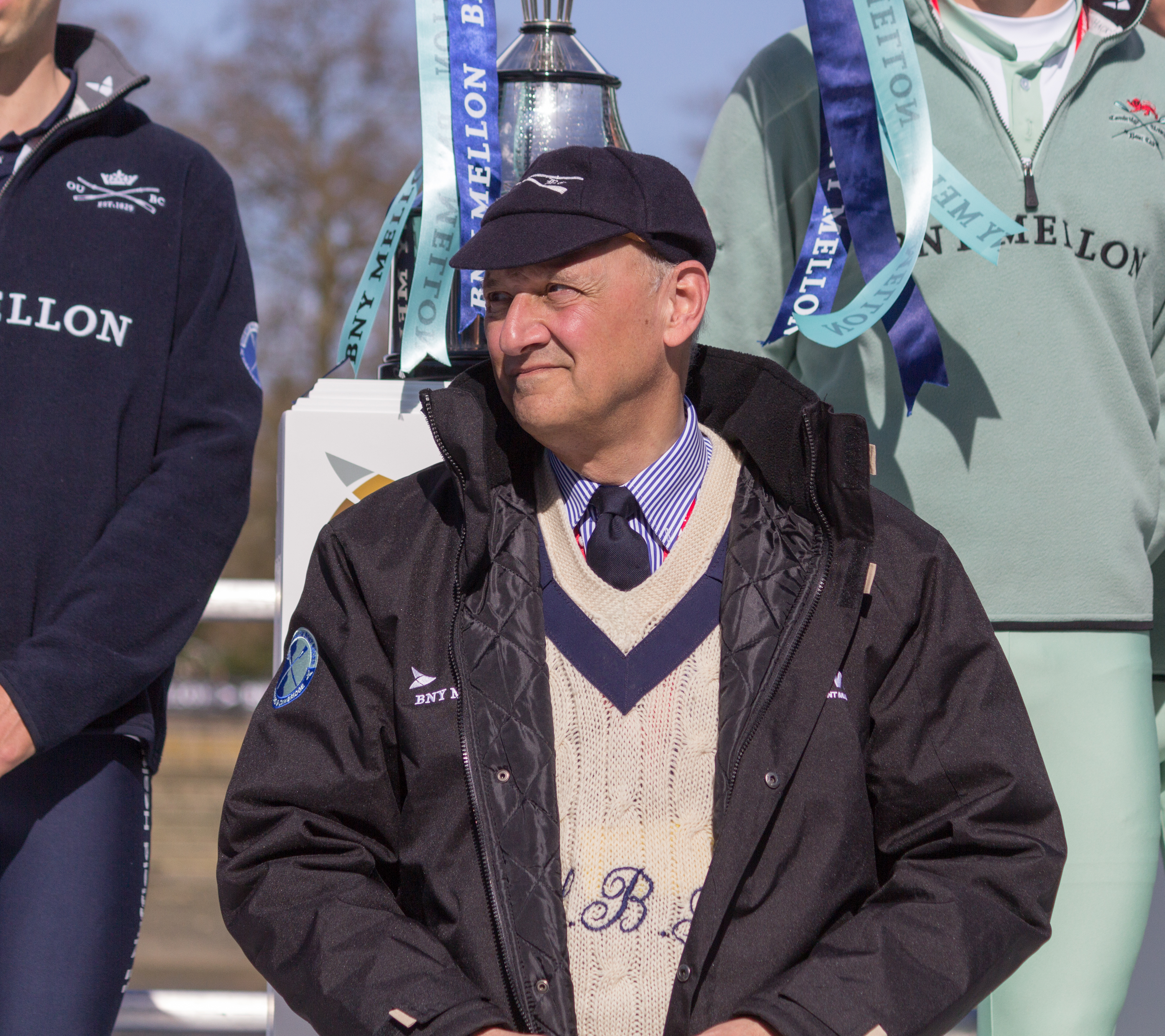
Rankov umpiring the 2015 Boat Race

Nikolas Boris Rankov (born 9 August 1954) is a British emeritus professor of Roman history at Royal Holloway, University of London. He is a former rower and current umpire.

== Early life, education and family ==
Rankov was born in Bradford, West Yorkshire, the only son of Radoslav and Helga Rankov. He was educated at Bradford Grammar School (1963–1973), then subsequently Corpus Christi College, Oxford (MA 1980, DPhil 1987).

He married Kati Granger in 1981. He has two daughters.

== Academic career ==
Rankov's research interests include Roman history, especially Roman Britain, the Roman army, epigraphy and archaeology of the Roman empire, and ancient shipping.

Rankov was a Junior Research Fellow at St Hugh's College, Oxford from 1980 to 1983. Rankov has taught at the Classics and Ancient History Department of The University of Western Australia from 1986 to 1989, at the Classics Department at Royal Holloway University of London since 1990, and was Head of department from 1999 to 2002.

== Rowing ==
He is best known for his participation in the Oxford–Cambridge Boat Race, which Oxford won six times between 1978 and 1983, three times with Rankov in the 4 seat and three times in the 5 seat. This led to establishment of the so-called "Rankov Rule", which states that oarsmen will compete in the race no more than four times as an undergraduate and no more than four times as a graduate. Rankov was the Race umpire in 2003, 2005, 2009 and 2015.

Rankov was rowing master for the Trireme Trust's reconstructed trireme Olympias. As of 2004, Rankov was chairman of the Trust.
