= Acer Nethercott =

British coxswain (1977–2013)

Personal information
- Full name: Acer Gary Nethercott
- Nationality: British
- Born: 28 November 1977 Newmarket, England, UK
- Died: 26 January 2013 (aged 35)

Sport
- Country: United Kingdom
- Sport: Rowing
Medal record
Men's rowing
Representing Great Britain
Olympic Games
Silver medal – second place	2008 Beijing	Men's eight
World Championships
Bronze medal – third place	2007 Munich	Men's eight
- Updated on 27 January 2013

Acer Gary Nethercott (28 November 1977 – 26 January 2013) was a British coxswain, Olympic silver medallist and double Boat Race winner.

== Early life ==
Nethercott was born in Newmarket, England. Having attended Mark Hall Comprehensive School, Harlow, and The Broxbourne School in Hertfordshire, Acer was admitted to University College, Oxford to study Physics and Philosophy as an undergraduate. He subsequently earned a MPhil and then a DPhil degree in philosophy.

== The Boat Race ==
Nethercott took up rowing at Oxford University as a first year student but quickly switched to coxing when it became evident that his body type was more suited to that than pulling an oar. He became a member of both Oxford University Boat Club and Oxford University Women's Boat Club. He earned his first Blue when he steered the Oxford women's heavyweight blue boat to victory against Cambridge in 2000. The Oxford crew won by 2 1/4 lengths, and completed the Henley Boat Race course in a time of 6 minutes and 18 seconds.

Nethercott steered Isis to victory in 2002. A year later, he stepped up to the Blue Boat, steering Oxford in the closest Boat Race in recent memory. In a thrilling finish Oxford won the 4 1/4 mile race by just a foot in a time of 18 minutes and 6 seconds. The race was also notable for it being the first time in history two sets of brothers competed against each other. David Livingston (Oxford) raced against his older brother James, and a last minute call up for Ben Smith (who joined the Cambridge Blue Boat from Goldie hours before the race after the original crew member was injured) meant that he competed against his brother Matthew, the Oxford president.

In 2004, Nethercott won his seat in the Blue Boat after a tense internal competition with Peter Hackworth, the 2002 winning Blue Boat cox who had taken a year out to study in Italy. In a controversial race, in which the two boats clashed blades and the Oxford bowman came off his seat, Oxford lost by 6 lengths in a time of 18 minutes and 17 seconds.

Nethercott's final Boat Race was in 2005. Both universities had extremely strong intakes that year, with Cambridge boasting several world champions and the Oxford crew including Olympic silver medallist Barney Williams. Oxford won the contest by 2 lengths in a time of 16 minutes 42 seconds.

== International coxing career ==
Nethercott coxed the British Eight from 2005 to 2008, winning bronze at the 2007 World Rowing Championships in Munich. A year later he won a silver medal at the Olympic Games in Beijing.

== Other rowing ==
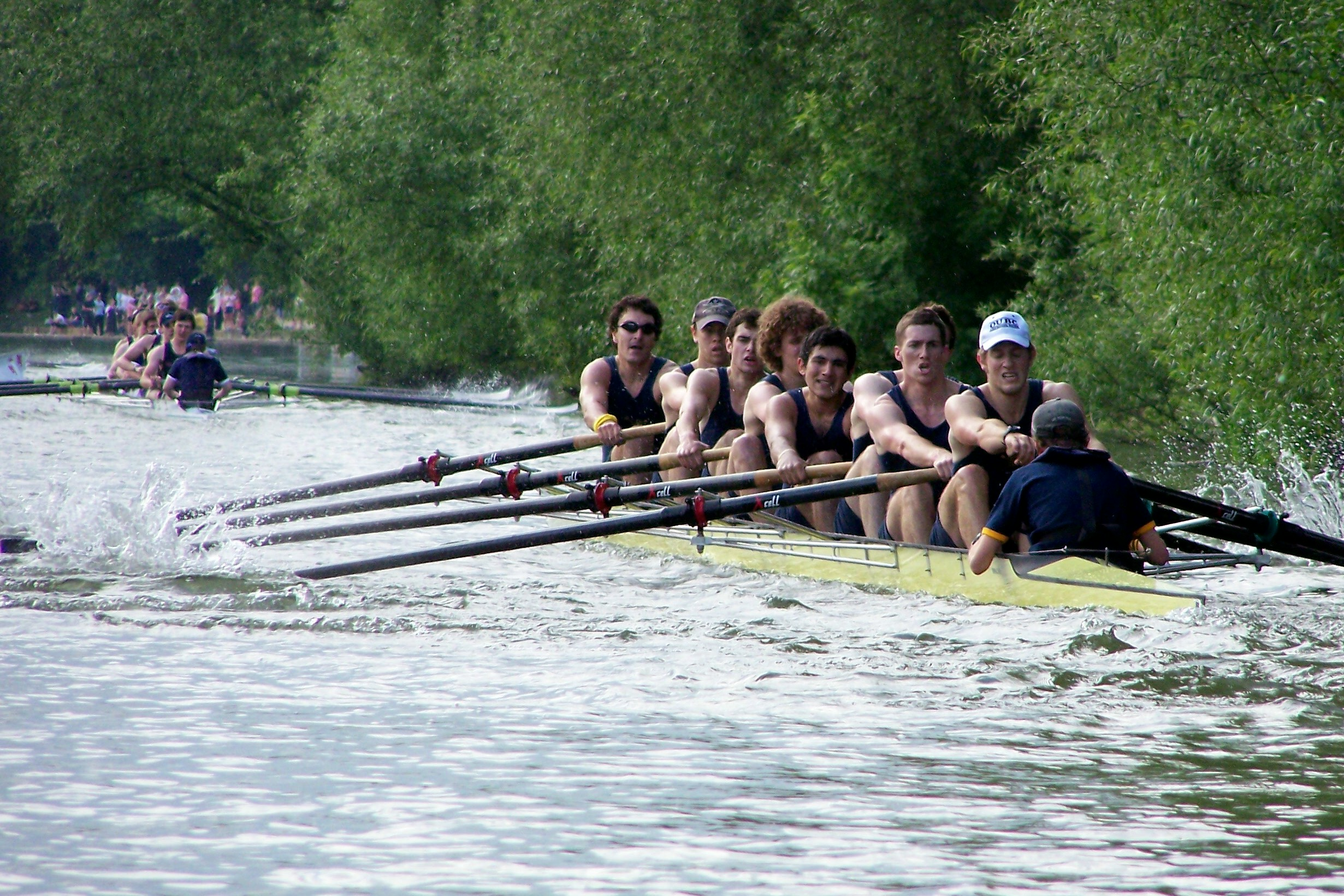
University College Men's 1st VIII 2007 with Acer Nethercott steering.

Despite coxing for both Oxford University Boat Club and Great Britain, Nethercott still found time to compete for University College Boat Club in 2007 in the annual Eights Week competition. Acer started coxing in his first term at University College, when he took part in the traditional freshers' Christchurch Regatta.

== Death ==
Nethercott died on 26 January 2013 from glioblastoma multiforme, an aggressive form of brain cancer. Oxford's winning boat in the 2013 Boat Race was named in his honour.

== Achievements ==
=== Olympics ===
- 2008 Beijing – Silver, Eight (coxswain)

=== World Championships ===
- 2007 Munich – Bronze, Eight (coxswain)
- 2006 Eton – 5th, Eight (coxswain)
- 2005 Gifu – 4th, Eight (coxswain)

=== World Cups ===
- 2008 Poznań – Gold, Eight (coxswain)
- 2008 Lucerne – Bronze, Eight (coxswain)
- 2008 Munich – Silver, Eight (coxswain)
- 2007 Lucerne – 4th, Eight (coxswain)
- 2007 Amsterdam – Bronze, Eight (coxswain)
- 2007 Linz – 5th, Eight (coxswain)
- 2006 Lucerne – 6th, Eight (coxswain)
- 2006 Munich – 5th, Eight (coxswain)
- 2005 Lucerne – 5th, Eight (coxswain)
- 2005 Eton – Bronze, Eight (coxswain)

== Legacy ==
A boat was named in Acer Nethercott's honour on 31 May 2014 at the University College Boathouse on the Isis at Oxford at the end of the last day of Eights Week. In January 2015, Oxford University announced that they would name their new sports centre building in his honour.
