= May Bumps 2022 =

Rowing races at Cambridge University

The May Bumps 2022 was a series of rowing races at Cambridge University from Wednesday 15 June 2022 to Saturday 18 June 2022. The event was run as a bumps race and was the 129th set of races in the series of May Bumps which have been held annually in mid-June in this form since 1887.

Following the cancellation of the 2020 and 2021 editions, this was the first time the May Bumps had been raced since three years prior in 2019.

== Head of the River crews ==
Caius men rowed over on all four nights of the competition to retain the headship they won in 2019.

Newnham decisively retained their 2019 headship by rowing over on all four nights.

== Highest 2nd VIIIs ==
Despite being bumped by Queens' on the first night and a row-over on the second, Lady Margaret II then bumped Robinson and 1st & 3rd Trinity on the third and fourth nights respectively, rising to 12th in the first division.

Combined with three row-overs, Newnham II bumped Darwin on the second night to finish 4th in the second division.

== Links to races in other years ==
Preceding year	Current year	Following year
May Bumps 2021 (cancelled)	May Bumps 2022	May Bumps 2023
Lent Bumps 2021 (cancelled)	Lent Bumps 2022	Lent Bumps 2023

== Bumps Charts ==
Below are the bumps charts for all 5 men's and all 5 women's divisions, with the men's event on the left and women's event on the right. The bumps chart shows the progress of every crew over all four days of the racing. To follow the progress of any particular crew, find the crew's name on the left side of the chart and follow the line to the end-of-the-week finishing position on the right of the chart.

This chart may not be displayed correctly if you are using a large font size on your browser. A simple way to check is to see that the first horizontal bold line, marking the boundary between divisions, lies between positions 17 and 18.

Pos	Crew	Men's Bumps Chart	Crew	Pos	Crew	Women's Bumps Chart	Crew	Pos
1	Caius		Caius	1	Newnham		Newnham	1
2	Magdalene		Lady Margaret	2	Jesus		Caius	2
3	Lady Margaret		Magdalene	3	Emmanuel		Emmanuel	3
4	Downing		Pembroke	4	Caius		Pembroke	4
5	Emmanuel		Peterhouse	5	Lady Margaret		Jesus	5
6	Pembroke		Emmanuel	6	Downing		Lady Margaret	6
7	Peterhouse		Downing	7	Pembroke		Downing	7
8	Clare		King's	8	Churchill		Fitzwilliam	8
9	1st & 3rd Trinity		Clare	9	1st & 3rd Trinity		Christ's	9
10	King's		Queens'	10	Clare		Churchill	10
11	Robinson		Jesus	11	Fitzwilliam		1st & 3rd Trinity	11
12	Jesus		Lady Margaret II	12	Girton		Trinity Hall	12
13	Lady Margaret II		1st & 3rd Trinity	13	Christ's		Clare	13
14	Queens'		Hughes Hall	14	Queens'		St. Catharine's	14
15	Christ's		Robinson	15	St. Catharine's		Girton	15
16	Trinity Hall		Selwyn	16	Trinity Hall		Queens'	16
17	Selwyn		Christ's	17	Homerton		Magdalene	17
18	Wolfson		St. Catharine's	18	King's		Homerton	18
19	Hughes Hall		Trinity Hall	19	Peterhouse		Peterhouse	19
20	Churchill		Caius II	20	Darwin		King's	20
21	St. Catharine's		Fitzwilliam	21	Magdalene		Newnham II	21
22	Girton		Wolfson	22	Newnham II		Lucy Cavendish	22
23	Caius II		Girton	23	Emmanuel II		Darwin	23
24	Homerton		Churchill	24	Jesus II		Sidney Sussex	24
25	Fitzwilliam		Corpus Christi	25	Murray Edwards		Emmanuel II	25
26	Pembroke II		St Edmund's	26	Lucy Cavendish		Jesus II	26
27	St Edmund's		Sidney Sussex	27	Wolfson		Selwyn	27
28	Corpus Christi		Homerton	28	Sidney Sussex		Murray Edwards	28
29	Emmanuel II		Emmanuel II	29	Selwyn		Caius II	29
30	Sidney Sussex		Pembroke II	30	Downing II		Wolfson	30
31	Downing II		Clare II	31	Robinson		Corpus Christi	31
32	Jesus II		Darwin	32	Corpus Christi		Robinson	32
33	Darwin		Downing II	33	Caius II		Pembroke II	33
34	1st & 3rd Trinity II		1st & 3rd Trinity II	34	Pembroke II		Downing II	34
35	Clare II		Jesus II	35	Queens' II		Lady Margaret II	35
36	Robinson II		Magdalene II	36	Lady Margaret II		Queens' II	36
37	Magdalene II		Queens' II	37	Trinity Hall II		Clare II	37
38	Queens' II		St. Catharine's II	38	Clare II		Emmanuel III	38
39	St. Catharine's II		Churchill II	39	St Edmund's		Trinity Hall II	39
40	Christ's II		Robinson II	40	Emmanuel III		Hughes Hall	40
41	Jesus III		Trinity Hall II	41	Hughes Hall		St Edmund's	41
42	Churchill II		Christ's II	42	St. Catharine's II		St. Catharine's II	42
43	Trinity Hall II		Emmanuel III	43	Newnham III		Pembroke III	43
44	Emmanuel III		Lady Margaret III	44	Homerton II		Newnham III	44
45	Lady Margaret III		Jesus III	45	Murray Edwards II		Murray Edwards II	45
46	Peterhouse II		Peterhouse II	46	Jesus III		Homerton II	46
47	Clare Hall		Clare Hall	47	Pembroke III		Lucy Cavendish II	47
48	Queens' III		Fitzwilliam II	48	Darwin II		Queens' III	48
49	Selwyn II		Selwyn II	49	Clare Hall		Jesus III	49
50	Fitzwilliam II		Hughes Hall II	50	Lucy Cavendish II		Caius III	50
51	Pembroke III		Caius III	51	Christ's II		Darwin II	51
52	Caius III		Queens' III	52	Queens' III		Clare III	52
53	Hughes Hall II		1st & 3rd Trinity III	53	Clare III		Clare Hall	53
54	Wolfson II		Pembroke III	54	Caius III		Christ's II	54
55	Clare III		King's II	55	King's II		Sidney Sussex II	55
56	Corpus Christi II		Corpus Christi II	56	St. Catharine's III		Fitzwilliam II	56
57	1st & 3rd Trinity III		Girton II	57	Fitzwilliam II		Magdalene II	57
58	King's II		Clare III	58	Sidney Sussex II		King's II	58
59	Sidney Sussex II		St Edmund's II	59	Lady Margaret III		Churchill II	59
60	Trinity Hall III		Sidney Sussex II	60	Magdalene II		St. Catharine's III	60
61	Darwin II		Anglia Ruskin	61	Trinity Hall III		Emmanuel IV	61
62	Churchill III		Trinity Hall III	62	Clare IV		Lady Margaret III	62
63	Anglia Ruskin		Wolfson II	63	Caius IV		Caius IV	63
64	Downing III		Lucy Cavendish	64	Corpus Christi II		1st & 3rd Trinity II	64
65	Girton II		Churchill III	65	Emmanuel IV		Clare IV	65
66	St Edmund's II		Magdalene III	66	Churchill II		Peterhouse II	66
67	Homerton II		Downing III	67	1st & 3rd Trinity II		Corpus Christi II	67
68	Lucy Cavendish		Darwin II	68	Downing III		Jesus IV	68
69	St. Catharine's III		St. Catharine's III	69	Girton II		Trinity Hall III	69
70	Churchill III		Homerton II	70	Jesus IV		Downing III	70
71	Magdalene III		Emmanuel IV	71	Peterhouse II		Hughes Hall II	71
72	Magdalene IV		Churchill III	72	Caius V		Girton II	72
73	Clare IV		Fitzwilliam III	73	Hughes Hall II		Peterhouse III	73
74	Emmanuel IV		Peterhouse III	74	Peterhouse III		Caius V	74
75	Fitzwilliam III		Jesus IV	75				
76	Jesus IV		Clare IV	76				
77	Selwyn III		Lady Margaret V	77				
78	Peterhouse III		Magdalene IV	78				
79	Lady Margaret IV		Lady Margaret IV	79				
80	Lady Margaret V		Selwyn III	80				
