= May Bumps 2021 =

Cancelled rowing races at Cambridge University

The May Bumps 2021 were a set of rowing races at Cambridge University scheduled to take place from Wednesday 16 June 2021 to Saturday 19 June 2021. The event was to be run as a bumps race and would have been the 129th set of races in the series of May Bumps which had been held annually in mid-June since 1887. In this edition of the Mays, the women's divisions were due to be raced before the equivalent men's divisions.

As a result of the COVID-19 pandemic, the races were cancelled in mid-April, with a side-by-side regatta held in their place.

== Cancellation ==
On 4 January 2021, England's third national lockdown due to the COVID-19 pandemic was announced. Although students had returned to Cambridge following the gradual easing of measures throughout the spring of 2021 by the time the Mays were due to be held in June, CUCBC announced the cancellation of the races in mid-April. They cited the announcement by the University's Vice-Chancellor Stephen Toope that students would be unlikely to be able to return to the university en masse before Monday 17 May, leaving insufficient time available for the requisite twelve training outings that all crews competing in Bumps must have completed in preparation to ensure crew competence and safety. As an alternative, they suggested that a "non-contact rowing event" would allow more crews to complete safely given the relatively low level of experience in comparison to other years. An Eights Regatta was run by CUCBC in place of the cancelled Bumps races.

== June Eights Regatta ==
The June Eights Regatta which replaced the 2021 May Bumps took place over five days from Sunday 20 June 2021 to Thursday 24 June 2021. The first day of racing comprised the getting-on race which seeded the crews for the Swiss-style tournament that took place on the subsequent four days of the competition. Racing was held on a course of 1.1 kilometres in length on the Long Reach, with two boats racing side-by-side in each race. Each boat had the opportunity to participate in four races.

In total 154 crews were entered into the competition, of which the majority were women's crews - a historic first for a CUCBC-run event. However, due to an increase in COVID-19 cases among the student population in the days preceding the event, several crews were forced to withdraw before or during the competition.

Eight divisions were run in total, including first and second divisions for men's and women's senior and novice crews. The inclusion of novice divisions in a competition so late in the academic year is unusual but it was deemed appropriate given that student rowing had not been possible for much of the year due to the ongoing pandemic.

=== Cumulative results by division ===
==== Division 1 ====
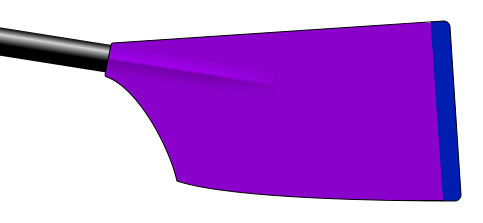
Magdalene M1 won all four of their races to finish at the top of the men's first division. Caius M1, Clare M1, Downing M1 and Lady Margaret M1 all won three races, Caius M2, Hughes Hall M1, Jesus M1, Pembroke M1, Queens' M1 and Sidney Sussex M1 won two races each and Christ's M1, Churchill M1, Fitzwilliam M1 and Wolfson M1 all won one of their four races. Trinity Hall M1 was the only crew in the division to lose all four races.

Caius W1 won the women's first division, having won all four of their races. Downing W1, Emmanuel W1, Newnham W1 and Pembroke W1 each won three races, Clare W1, Lady Margaret W1, Peterhouse W1, Queens' W1, Sidney Sussex W1 and Trinity Hall W1 won two races each and Corpus Christi W1, Darwin W1, Downing W2 and Pembroke W2 won one race each, while Murray Edwards W1 won none of their races.

==== Division 2 ====
Pembroke M2 won a tiebreaker with Lady Margaret M2 to claim victory in the men's second division after both crews won all four of their races. Crews to win three races were Darwin M1, Emmanuel M1, Girton M1, Jesus SX (the highest-ranked mixed crew) and Magdalene M2, while those who won two races each were Christ's M2, Downing M2, Downing M3, Pembroke M3, Peterhouse M1, Peterhouse M2, Queens' M2 and Selwyn M1. Meanwhile, Churchill M2, Clare Hall M1, Homerton M1 and Trinity Hall M2 won one race each, and Addenbrooke's SX and Selwyn M1 were left without any victories to claim. Clare M2 withdrew from the competition with no wins.

Caius W2 were victorious in the women's second division after their tiebreaker with Wolfson W1, each crew having won all four of their races. Churchill W1, Emmanuel W2, Fitzwilliam W1, King's W1 and Queens' W2 won three races each, Christ's W1, Clare W2, 1st & 3rd Trinity W1, Girton W1, Homerton W1, Lady Margaret W2, Newnham W2 and Pembroke W3 won two races each and Clare Hall W1, Magdalene W1, Murray Edwards W2, Peterhouse W2 and Sidney Sussex W2 each won one race. Fitzwilliam W2 and Trinity Hall W2 both finished without any wins, and both Selwyn W1 and Selwyn W2 withdrew from the tournament.

==== Novice Division 1 ====
Caius NM1 won their division outright, with Churchill NM1, Emmanuel NM1, 1st & 3rd Trinity NM1 and Fitzwilliam NM1 each winning three of their races and Clare NM1, Homerton NM1, Lady Margaret NM1, Pembroke NM1, Pembroke NM2 and Sidney Sussex NM1 each winning two. Darwin NM1, Hughes Hall NM1, Jesus NM1 and Trinity Hall NM1 managed a single win each, while Wolfson NM1 lost all four races.

Caius NW1 were the victors of the women's first novice division, while Downing NW1, Jesus NW1, Lady Margaret NW1 and Newnham NW1 finished with three wins each and Churchill NW1, Clare NW1, Darwin NW1, Lucy Cavendish NW1, Pembroke NW1/2 and Wolfson NW1 with two each. Christ's NW1, Homerton NW1 and Trinity Hall NW1 each won one race, while Girton NW1 finished with no wins and Selwyn NW1 withdrew.

==== Novice Division 2 ====
In a division comprising only nine boats, Downing NM2 came top of the leaderboard with four wins, followed by Caius NM2 with three and Christ's NM1 and Girton NM1 with two each. Trinity Hall NM2 won one race and Magdalene NM1 and Robinson NM1 were beaten in all four races. Both Selwyn NM1 and Selwyn NM2 scratched.

Fitzwilliam NW1 denied Caius a clean sweep in the women's divisions by winning all four of their races, closely followed by Clare NW2, Hughes Hall NW1 and Lucy Cavendish NW2 on three wins each. Christ's NW2, 1st & 3rd Trinity NW1, Murray Edwards NW1 and Queens' NW1 won two races each, with Churchill NW2 winning one and Clare NW3, the only third novice boat in the competition, losing all of their races. This division saw Selwyn NW2, Magdalene NW1, King's NW1 and Sidney Sussex NW1 all withdraw from the competition, with only Selwyn NW2 having won one race prior to their withdrawal.

== Links to races in other years ==
Preceding year	Current year	Following year
May Bumps 2020 (cancelled)	May Bumps 2021 (cancelled)	May Bumps 2022
Lent Bumps 2020	Lent Bumps 2021 (cancelled)	Lent Bumps 2022

== See also ==
- Impact of the COVID-19 pandemic on sports
- May Bumps 2020
- Lent Bumps 2021
