= Lent Bumps 2022 =

Rowing races at Cambridge University

The Lent Bumps 2022 were a set of rowing races at Cambridge University from Tuesday 1 March 2022 to Saturday 5 March 2022. The event was run as a bumps race and was the 128th set of races in the series of Lent Bumps which have been held annually in late February or early March since 1887. In this edition of the Lents, the women's divisions raced before the equivalent men's divisions, and the numbers of men's and women's boats competing were equal.

The races were the first set of Bumps to be held following the COVID-19 pandemic, which forced the cancellation of the Lents in 2021 and the Mays in 2020 and 2021. They were also the first in which Lucy Cavendish fielded a men's boat after the college became co-educational in October 2021.

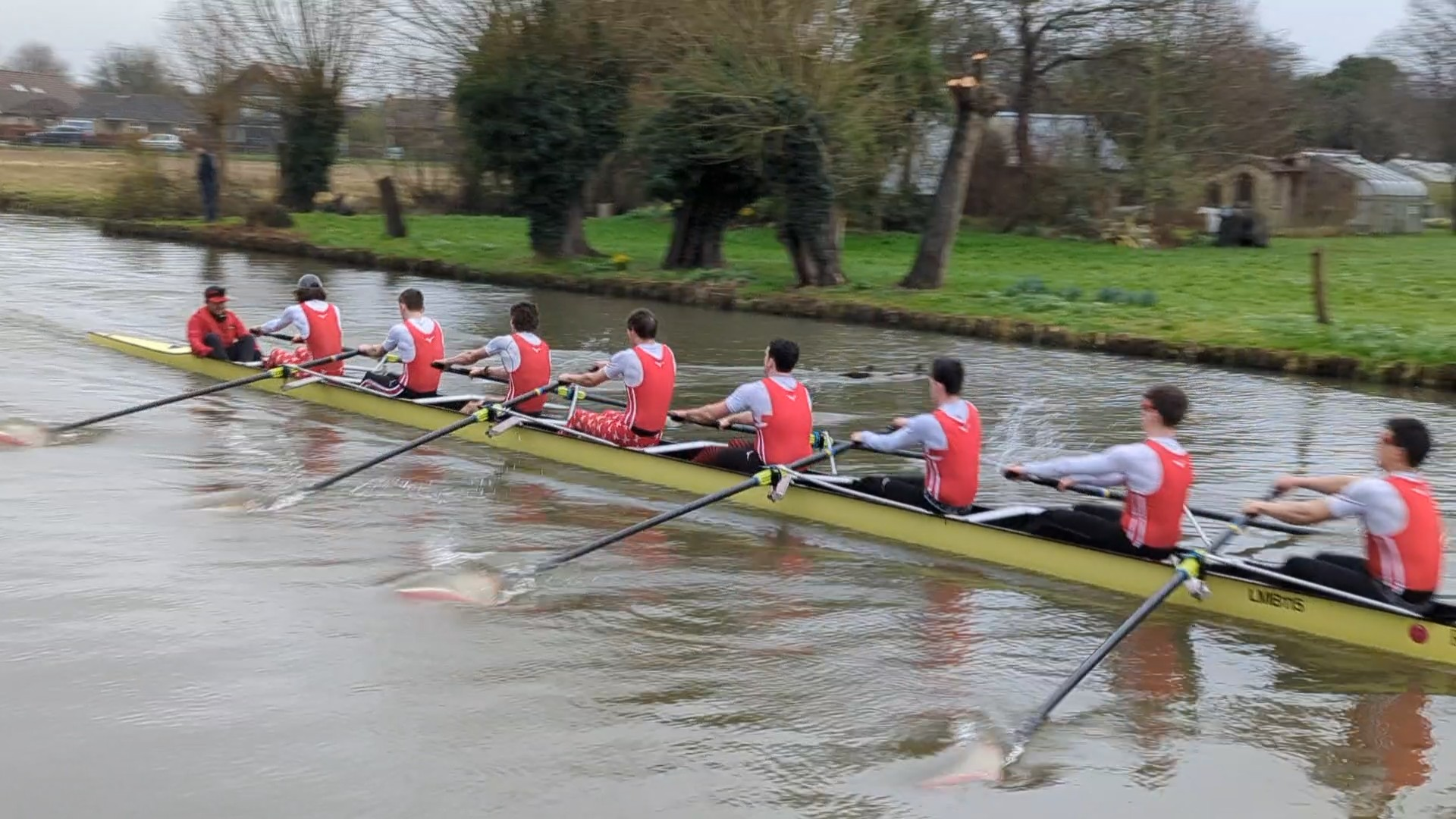
LMBC rowing over as head of Lents, Saturday

== Head of the River crews ==
Lady Margaret rowed over on all four days to retain the men's headship they won in 2020.

Newnham started in third place on the river and bumped Jesus and Downing to claim the women's headship on the second day, which they secured with two subsequent row-overs.

== Highest 2nd VIIIs ==
Lady Margaret II finished as the highest-placed second men's VIII on the river at 16th place in the first division, having bumped Churchill, Fitzwilliam and Christ's on days 1, 2 and 4 respectively.

Emmanuel II finished as the highest-placed second women's VIII on the river at 11th place in the second division, despite suffering bumps from Robinson, Magdalene and Corpus Christi on days 2, 3 and 4 respectively.

== Links to races in other years ==
Preceding year	Current year	Following year
Lent Bumps 2021 (cancelled)	Lent Bumps 2022	Lent Bumps 2023
May Bumps 2021 (cancelled)	May Bumps 2022	May Bumps 2023

== Bumps Charts ==
Below are the bumps charts for all 4 men's and all 4 women's divisions, with the men's event on the left and women's event on the right. The bumps chart shows the progress of every crew over all four days of the racing. To follow the progress of any particular crew, find the crew's name on the left side of the chart and follow the line to the end-of-the-week finishing position on the right of the chart.

This chart may not be displayed correctly if you are using a large font size on your browser. A simple way to check is to see that the first horizontal bold line, marking the boundary between divisions, lies between positions 17 and 18.

Pos	Crew	Men's Bumps Chart	Crew	Pos	Crew	Women's Bumps Chart	Crew	Pos
1	Lady Margaret		Lady Margaret	1	Downing		Newnham	1
2	Pembroke		Caius	2	Jesus		Downing	2
3	Caius		Pembroke	3	Newnham		Jesus	3
4	1st & 3rd Trinity		Downing	4	Emmanuel		Emmanuel	4
5	Downing		Jesus	5	Lady Margaret		Caius	5
6	Robinson		1st & 3rd Trinity	6	Pembroke		Pembroke	6
7	Trinity Hall		Magdalene	7	Churchill		Lady Margaret	7
8	Jesus		Trinity Hall	8	Clare		Trinity Hall	8
9	King's		King's	9	Caius		Clare	9
10	Magdalene		Robinson	10	1st & 3rd Trinity		Churchill	10
11	St. Catharine's		Clare	11	Trinity Hall		Christ's	11
12	Clare		St. Catharine's	12	Fitzwilliam		1st & 3rd Trinity	12
13	Christ's		Queens'	13	Christ's		Queens'	13
14	Peterhouse		Peterhouse	14	Queens'		St. Catharine's	14
15	Queens'		Emmanuel	15	Murray Edwards		Fitzwilliam	15
16	Fitzwilliam		Lady Margaret II	16	Darwin		Sidney Sussex	16
17	Emmanuel		Christ's	17	St. Catharine's		Darwin	17
18	Churchill		Fitzwilliam	18	Girton		Homerton	18
19	Lady Margaret II		Selwyn	19	Homerton		Murray Edwards	19
20	Girton		Churchill	20	Sidney Sussex		Peterhouse	20
21	Selwyn		Caius II	21	King's		Girton	21
22	Corpus Christi		Girton	22	Selwyn		King's	22
23	Hughes Hall		Sidney Sussex	23	Peterhouse		Lucy Cavendish	23
24	Caius II		Homerton	24	Lucy Cavendish		Selwyn	24
25	Sidney Sussex		Corpus Christi	25	Emmanuel II		Robinson	25
26	Wolfson		Hughes Hall	26	Jesus II		Magdalene	26
27	Darwin		1st & 3rd Trinity II	27	Robinson		Corpus Christi	27
28	1st & 3rd Trinity II		Darwin	28	Corpus Christi		Emmanuel II	28
29	St Edmund's		Pembroke II	29	Magdalene		Newnham II	29
30	Homerton		Wolfson	30	Newnham II		Jesus II	30
31	Pembroke II		Emmanuel II	31	Hughes Hall		Hughes Hall	31
32	Jesus II		Jesus II	32	Downing II		Queens' II	32
33	Queens' II		St Edmund's	33	Wolfson		Lady Margaret II	33
34	Emmanuel II		Clare II	34	Queens' II		Pembroke II	34
35	Clare II		Magdalene II	35	Clare II		Downing II	35
36	Magdalene II		Downing II	36	Lady Margaret II		Caius II	36
37	Downing II		Queens' II	37	St Edmund's		Wolfson	37
38	Robinson II		Christ's II	38	Pembroke II		Christ's II	38
39	St. Catharine's II		Trinity Hall II	39	Caius II		Clare II	39
40	Christ's II		St. Catharine's II	40	St. Catharine's II		Emmanuel III	40
41	Churchill II		Fitzwilliam II	41	Christ's II		St Edmund's	41
42	Clare Hall		Robinson II	42	Emmanuel III		St. Catharine's II	42
43	Trinity Hall II		Lady Margaret III	43	Trinity Hall II		Newnham III	43
44	Fitzwilliam II		Peterhouse II	44	Clare Hall		Trinity Hall II	44
45	1st & 3rd Trinity III		Clare Hall	45	Newnham III		Queens' III	45
46	Lady Margaret III		1st & 3rd Trinity III	46	Sidney Sussex II		Sidney Sussex II	46
47	Peterhouse II		Churchill II	47	Magdalene II		Trinity Hall III	47
48	Hughes Hall II		Selwyn II	48	Queens' III		Clare Hall	48
49	Lucy Cavendish		Hughes Hall II	49	Anglia Ruskin		1st & 3rd Trinity II	49
50	Addenbrooke's		Lucy Cavendish	50	Fitzwilliam II		Magdalene II	50
51	Pembroke III		Girton II	51	Trinity Hall III		Caius III	51
52	Churchill III		Pembroke III	52	1st & 3rd Trinity II		Anglia Ruskin	52
53	Selwyn II		Addenbrooke's	53	Caius III		Churchill II	53
54	Girton II		Lady Margaret IV	54	Lucy Cavendish II		Fitzwilliam II	54
55	Lady Margaret IV		Selwyn III	55	Churchill II		Peterhouse II	55
56	St. Catharine's III		Churchill III	56	Pembroke III		Lucy Cavendish II	56
57	Selwyn III		St. Catharine's III	57	Peterhouse II		King's II	57
58	King's II		King's II	58	Lady Margaret III		Pembroke III	58
59	Emmanuel III		Emmanuel III	59	King's II		Lady Margaret III	59
60	Caius III		Caius III	63	Caius IV		Caius IV	60
