= May Bumps 1963 =

Rowing races at Cambridge University

The May Bumps 1963 were a set of rowing races held at Cambridge University in June 1963. The event was run as a bumps race and was the 72nd set of races in the series of May Bumps which have been held annually in mid-June since 1887. In 1963, 129 boats competed in eight men's divisions.

These were the only set of bumps races held at Cambridge University in 1963 as the Lent Bumps of 1963 were cancelled due to the river being frozen.

== Head of the River crew ==
Queens' rowed over untroubled in first position to secure their second headship.

== Highest 2nd VIIIs ==
Despite being bumped on every day of the competition, Jesus remained the highest-placed 2nd VIII.

== Links to races in other years ==
| Preceding year | Current year | Following year |
|---|---|---|
| May Bumps 1962 | May Bumps 1963 | May Bumps 1964 |
| Lent Bumps 1962 | Lent Bumps 1963 (cancelled) | Lent Bumps 1964 |

== Bumps Charts ==
Below are the bumps charts for the men's 1st division. The bumps chart represents the progress of every crew over all four days of the racing. To follow the progress of any particular crew, simply find the crew's name on the left side of the chart and follow the line to the end-of-the-week finishing position on the right of the chart.

| Pos | Crew | Men's Bumps Chart | Crew | Pos |
|---|---|---|---|---|
| 1 | Queens' | | Queens' | 1 |
| 2 | Jesus | | 1st & 3rd Trinity | 2 |
| 3 | Lady Margaret | | Jesus | 3 |
| 4 | 1st & 3rd Trinity | | Pembroke | 4 |
| 5 | Pembroke | | Clare | 5 |
| 6 | St. Catharine's | | Emmanuel | 6 |
| 7 | Clare | | Lady Margaret | 7 |
| 8 | Emmanuel | | Magdalene | 8 |
| 9 | Jesus II | | St. Catharine's | 9 |
| 10 | Magdalene | | Christ's | 10 |
| 11 | Christ's | | Trinity Hall | 11 |
| 12 | Trinity Hall | | Downing | 12 |
| 13 | Lady Margaret II | | Jesus II | 13 |
| 14 | Selwyn | | St. Catharine's II | 14 |
| 15 | Peterhouse | | Lady Margaret II | 15 |
| 16 | Downing | | Selwyn | 16 |
