= Lent Bumps 2020 =

The Lent Bumps 2020 was a series of rowing races at Cambridge University from Tuesday 25 February 2020 to Saturday 29 February 2020. The event was run as a bumps race and was the 127th set of races in the series of Lent Bumps which have been held annually in late February or early March since 1887.

The races were the last set of Bumps before the COVID-19 pandemic forced the cancellation of all Lent and May Bumps events in Cambridge until the Lent Bumps 2022 two years later.

== Head of the River crews ==
Lady Margaret M1 bumped Caius on First Post Corner on day 1, reclaiming the headship that Caius M1 had won the previous year.

Starting 4th on the river, Downing W1 bumped Emmanuel W1 and Newnham W1 on the first and second days respectively, before rowing over on the third day and bumping Jesus W1 (who had taken headship from Newnham on the first day) on the fourth day to claim the headship that Newnham had held since the previous year.

== Highest 2nd VIIIs ==
Lady Margaret II rowed over four times, as did Churchill ahead of them and Girton and Selwyn behind them, remaining the highest men's second VIII at 2nd place in the second division.

After rowing over on day 1, Emmanuel II were bumped by Robinson on the second day, but bumped them back on the third day before bumping Jesus II on the fourth day, becoming the highest placed second women's VIII on the river and finishing at 8th position in the second division.

== Links to races in other years ==
Preceding year	Current year	Following year
Lent Bumps 2019	Lent Bumps 2020	Lent Bumps 2021 (cancelled)
May Bumps 2019	May Bumps 2020 (cancelled)	May Bumps 2021 (cancelled)

== Bumps Charts ==
Below are the bumps charts for all 4 men's and all 4 women's divisions, with the men's event on the left and women's event on the right. The bumps chart shows the progress of every crew over all four days of the racing. To follow the progress of any particular crew, find the crew's name on the left side of the chart and follow the line to the end-of-the-week finishing position on the right of the chart.

This chart may not be displayed correctly if you are using a large font size on your browser. A simple way to check is to see that the first horizontal bold line, marking the boundary between divisions, lies between positions 17 and 18.

Pos	Crew	Men's Bumps Chart	Crew	Pos	Crew	Women's Bumps Chart	Crew	Pos
1	Caius		Lady Margaret	1	Newnham		Downing	1
2	Lady Margaret		Pembroke	2	Jesus		Jesus	2
3	Downing		Caius	3	Emmanuel		Newnham	3
4	Pembroke		1st & 3rd Trinity	4	Downing		Emmanuel	4
5	Robinson		Downing	5	Lady Margaret		Lady Margaret	5
6	Jesus		Robinson	6	1st & 3rd Trinity		Pembroke	6
7	1st & 3rd Trinity		Trinity Hall	7	Pembroke		Churchill	7
8	St. Catharine's		Jesus	8	Clare		Clare	8
9	Christ's		King's	9	Trinity Hall		Caius	9
10	Trinity Hall		Magdalene	10	Christ's		1st & 3rd Trinity	10
11	Peterhouse		St. Catharine's	11	Churchill		Trinity Hall	11
12	King's		Clare	12	Murray Edwards		Fitzwilliam	12
13	Clare		Christ's	13	Caius		Christ's	13
14	Magdalene		Peterhouse	14	Girton		Queens'	14
15	Emmanuel		Queens'	15	Fitzwilliam		Murray Edwards	15
16	Queens'		Fitzwilliam	16	St. Catharine's		Darwin	16
17	Fitzwilliam		Emmanuel	17	Queens'		St. Catharine's	17
18	Churchill		Churchill	18	King's		Girton	18
19	Lady Margaret II		Lady Margaret II	19	Darwin		Homerton	19
20	Girton		Girton	20	Homerton		Sidney Sussex	20
21	Selwyn		Selwyn	21	Lucy Cavendish		King's	21
22	Wolfson		Corpus Christi	22	Peterhouse		Selwyn	22
23	Caius II		Hughes Hall	23	Sidney Sussex		Peterhouse	23
24	Corpus Christi		Caius II	24	Jesus II		Lucy Cavendish	24
25	St Edmund's		Sidney Sussex	25	Selwyn		Emmanuel II	25
26	Darwin		Wolfson	26	Emmanuel II		Jesus II	26
27	Sidney Sussex		Darwin	27	Robinson		Robinson	27
28	Jesus II		1st & 3rd Trinity II	28	Hughes Hall		Corpus Christi	28
29	Hughes Hall		St Edmund's	29	Magdalene		Magdalene	29
30	1st & 3rd Trinity II		Homerton	30	Wolfson		Newnham II	30
31	Pembroke II		Pembroke II	31	Clare II		Hughes Hall	31
32	Homerton		Jesus II	32	Corpus Christi		Downing II	32
33	Downing II		Queens' II	33	Newnham II		Wolfson	33
34	Emmanuel II		Emmanuel II	34	Queens' II		Queens' II	34
35	Clare II		Clare II	35	Lady Margaret II		Clare II	35
36	Queens' II		Magdalene II	36	St Edmund's		Lady Margaret II	36
37	Christ's II		Downing II	37	Downing II		St Edmund's	37
38	Magdalene II		Robinson II	38	St. Catharine's II		Pembroke II	38
39	St. Catharine's II		St. Catharine's II	39	Pembroke II		Caius II	39
40	Trinity Hall II		Christ's II	40	Christ's II		St. Catharine's II	40
41	Robinson II		Churchill II	41	Caius II		Christ's II	41
42	Clare Hall		Clare Hall	42	Trinity Hall II		Emmanuel III	42
43	1st & 3rd Trinity III		Trinity Hall II	43	Jesus III		Darwin II	43
44	Churchill II		Fitzwilliam II	44	Darwin II		Trinity Hall II	44
45	Fitzwilliam II		1st & 3rd Trinity III	45	Newnham III		Jesus III	45
46	Lady Margaret III		Jesus III	46	Emmanuel III		Clare Hall	46
47	Jesus III		Queens' III	47	Clare Hall		Newnham III	47
48	Queens' III		Lady Margaret III	48	Homerton II		Sidney Sussex II	48
49	Peterhouse II		Peterhouse II	49	Clare III		Homerton II	49
50	Anglia Ruskin		Hughes Hall II	50	Queens' III		Magdalene II	50
51	Addenbrooke's		Addenbrooke's	51	Anglia Ruskin		Clare III	51
52	Wolfson II		Downing III	52	Magdalene II		Queens' III	52
53	Hughes Hall II		Anglia Ruskin	53	Sidney Sussex II		Downing III	53
54	Downing III		Pembroke III	54	Downing III		Anglia Ruskin	54
55	Selwyn II		Wolfson II	55	Corpus Christi II		Fitzwilliam II	55
56	Darwin II		Churchill III	56	Trinity Hall III		Trinity Hall III	56
57	Pembroke III		Selwyn II	57	Fitzwilliam II		Corpus Christi II	57
58	Magdalene III		Girton II	58				
59	Churchill III		Darwin II	59				
60	Homerton II		Magdalene III	60				
61	Girton II		Homerton II	61				
62	Queens' IV		Churchill IV	62				
63	Churchill IV		Queens' IV	63				
