= May Bumps 2019 =

Rowing races at Cambridge University

The May Bumps 2019 was a series of rowing races at Cambridge University from Wednesday 12 June 2019 to Saturday 15 June 2019. The event was run as a bumps race and was the 128th set of races in the series of May Bumps which have been held annually in mid-June in this form since 1887.

== Head of the River crews ==
Caius men bumped Pembroke, Magdalene and Lady Margaret on the first, second and third nights respectively to claim headship for the first time since 2016.

Starting in 2nd position, Newnham bumped Jesus women on the second night to claim Mays headship for the first time since 2003. This is Newnham's first 'Double Headship', meaning they hold Headship in both the Lent and May Bumps in the same year.

== Highest 2nd VIIIs ==
Lady Margaret II achieved blades by bumping Wolfson, Selwyn, Christ's and Queens', rising to 13th in the first division.

Newnham II bumped Wolfson, Lucy Cavendish and Jesus II before rowing over on the fourth night, securing W2 headship at 5th in the second division.

== Links to races in other years ==
Preceding year	Current year	Following year
May Bumps 2018	May Bumps 2019	May Bumps 2020 (cancelled)
Lent Bumps 2018	Lent Bumps 2019	Lent Bumps 2020

== Bumps Charts ==
Below are the bumps charts for all 4 men's and all 4 women's divisions, with the men's event on the left and women's event on the right. The bumps chart shows the progress of every crew over all four days of the racing. To follow the progress of any particular crew, find the crew's name on the left side of the chart and follow the line to the end-of-the-week finishing position on the right of the chart.

This chart may not be displayed correctly if you are using a large font size on your browser. A simple way to check is to see that the first horizontal bold line, marking the boundary between divisions, lies between positions 17 and 18.

Pos	Crew	Men's Bumps Chart	Crew	Pos	Crew	Women's Bumps Chart	Crew	Pos
1	Lady Margaret		Caius	1	Jesus		Newnham	1
2	Clare		Magdalene	2	Newnham		Jesus	2
3	Pembroke		Lady Margaret	3	Emmanuel		Emmanuel	3
4	Caius		Downing	4	Downing		Caius	4
5	Magdalene		Emmanuel	5	Caius		Lady Margaret	5
6	Downing		Pembroke	6	Clare		Downing	6
7	Emmanuel		Peterhouse	7	Lady Margaret		Pembroke	7
8	1st & 3rd Trinity		Clare	8	Girton		Churchill	8
9	Jesus		1st & 3rd Trinity	9	Churchill		1st & 3rd Trinity	9
10	Peterhouse		King's	10	1st & 3rd Trinity		Clare	10
11	Queens'		Robinson	11	Pembroke		Fitzwilliam	11
12	King's		Jesus	12	Christ's		Girton	12
13	Robinson		Lady Margaret II	13	Fitzwilliam		Christ's	13
14	Christ's		Queens'	14	Homerton		Queens'	14
15	Selwyn		Christ's	15	Peterhouse		St. Catharine's	15
16	Wolfson		Trinity Hall	16	St. Catharine's		Trinity Hall	16
17	Lady Margaret II		Selwyn	17	Queens'		Homerton	17
18	Girton		Wolfson	18	Trinity Hall		King's	18
19	Churchill		Hughes Hall	19	King's		Peterhouse	19
20	Homerton		Churchill	20	Jesus II		Darwin	20
21	Trinity Hall		St. Catharine's	21	Darwin		Magdalene	21
22	St. Catharine's		Girton	22	Magdalene		Newnham II	22
23	Hughes Hall		Caius II	23	Lucy Cavendish		Emmanuel II	23
24	St Edmund's		Homerton	24	Wolfson		Jesus II	24
25	Fitzwilliam		Fitzwilliam	25	Newnham II		Murray Edwards	25
26	Corpus Christi		Pembroke II	26	Emmanuel II		Lucy Cavendish	26
27	Caius II		St Edmund's	27	Murray Edwards		Wolfson	27
28	Sidney Sussex		Corpus Christi	28	Sidney Sussex		Sidney Sussex	28
29	Pembroke II		Emmanuel II	29	Selwyn		Selwyn	29
30	Darwin		Sidney Sussex	30	Pembroke II		Downing II	30
31	Downing II		Downing II	31	Downing II		Robinson	31
32	Jesus II		Jesus II	32	Corpus Christi		Corpus Christi	32
33	Emmanuel II		Darwin	33	Robinson		Caius II	33
34	1st & 3rd Trinity II		1st & 3rd Trinity II	34	Lady Margaret II		Pembroke II	34
35	Clare II		Clare II	35	Queens' II		Queens' II	35
36	Christ's II		Robinson II	36	Caius II		Lady Margaret II	36
37	Queens' II		Magdalene II	37	Clare II		Trinity Hall II	37
38	Robinson II		Queens' II	38	Trinity Hall II		Clare II	38
39	St. Catharine's II		St. Catharine's II	39	Hughes Hall		St Edmund's	39
40	Magdalene II		Christ's II	40	St Edmund's		Emmanuel III	40
41	Lady Margaret III		Jesus III	41	St. Catharine's II		Hughes Hall	41
42	Trinity Hall II		Churchill II	42	Newnham III		St. Catharine's II	42
43	Peterhouse II		Trinity Hall II	43	Emmanuel III		Newnham III	43
44	Jesus III		Emmanuel III	44	Pembroke III		Homerton II	44
45	Churchill II		Lady Margaret III	45	Murray Edwards II		Murray Edwards II	45
46	Queens' III		Peterhouse II	46	Darwin II		Jesus III	46
47	Fitzwilliam II		Clare Hall	47	Christ's II		Pembroke III	47
48	Emmanuel III		Queens' III	48	Homerton II		Darwin II	48
49	Clare III		Selwyn II	49	Jesus III		Clare Hall	49
50	Wolfson II		Fitzwilliam II	50	Clare III		Lucy Cavendish II	50
51	Selwyn II		Pembroke III	51	King's II		Christ's II	51
52	Caius III		Caius III	52	Clare Hall		Queens' III	52
53	1st & 3rd Trinity III		Hughes Hall II	53	Anglia Ruskin		Clare III	53
54	Clare Hall		Wolfson II	54	Lucy Cavendish II		Caius III	54
55	Corpus Christi II		Clare III	55	St. Catharine's III		King's II	55
56	Hughes Hall II		Corpus Christi II	56	Queens' III		Anglia Ruskin	56
57	King's II		1st & 3rd Trinity III	57	Caius III		St. Catharine's III	57
58	Pembroke III		King's II	58	Fitzwilliam II		Fitzwilliam II	58
59	Darwin II		Sidney Sussex II	59	Sidney Sussex II		Sidney Sussex II	59
60	Anglia Ruskin		Trinity Hall III	60	Clare IV		Lady Margaret III	60
61	Girton II		Darwin II	61	Lady Margaret III		Magdalene II	61
62	Sidney Sussex II		Churchill III	62	Trinity Hall III		Trinity Hall III	62
63	St Edmund's II		Anglia Ruskin	63	Magdalene II		St Edmund's II	63
64	Trinity Hall III		Downing III	64	Pembroke IV		Clare IV	64
65	St. Catharine's III		Girton II	65	Darwin III		Caius IV	65
66	Churchill III		St Edmund's II	66	Emmanuel IV		Corpus Christi II	66
67	Homerton II		Homerton II	67	Homerton III		Emmanuel IV	67
68	Downing III		St. Catharine's III	68	Caius IV		Pembroke IV	68
69	Christ's III		Christ's III	69	St Edmund's II		Darwin III	69
70	Magdalene III		Magdalene III	70	Corpus Christi II		Churchill II	70
71	Jesus IV		Magdalene IV	71	Fitzwilliam III		Homerton III	71
72	Queens' IV		Clare IV	72	Churchill II		1st & 3rd Trinity II	72
73	Magdalene IV		Queens' IV	73	Robinson II		Robinson II	73
74	Clare IV		Emmanuel IV	74	1st & 3rd Trinity II		Downing III	74
75	Emmanuel IV		Fitzwilliam III	75	Jesus IV		Fitzwilliam III	75
76	Corpus Christi III		Jesus IV	76	Girton II		Girton II	76
77	Jesus V		Queens' V	77	Downing III		Jesus IV	77
78	Pembroke IV		Jesus V	78				
79	Fitzwilliam III		Pembroke IV	79				
80	Queens' V		Corpus Christi III	80				
81	Trinity Hall IV		Selwyn III	81				
82	Downing IV		Peterhouse III	82				
83	Magdalene V		Downing IV	83				
84	Selwyn III		Trinity Hall IV	84				
85	Corpus Christi IV		Magdalene V	85				
86	Peterhouse III		Downing V	86				
87	Darwin III		Caius IV	87				
88	Downing V		Corpus Christi IV	88				
89	Churchill IV		Darwin III	89				
90	Magdalene VI		Churchill IV	90				
91	Caius IV		Magdalene VI	91				
