= Lent Bumps 2021 =

Rowing races at Cambridge University

The Lent Bumps 2021 was a series of rowing races at Cambridge University scheduled to take place from Tuesday 9 March 2021 to Saturday 13 March 2021. The event was to be run as a bumps race and would have been the 128th set of races in the series of Lent Bumps which had been held annually in late February or early March since 1887. The 2021 races were due to be the first Lent races in which the women's divisions were to be held following the respective men's divisions, following a CUCBC rule change in June 2019 such that the final division should alternate between men's and women's divisions each year.

As a result of the COVID-19 pandemic, and in particular the second wave in the UK which caused a third national lockdown in England, the races did not go ahead as planned. Despite a discussion involving CUCBC and college boat clubs about the possibility of a virtual alternative competition, no such event was organised in their place, unlike the previous summer when students had organised and competed in a set of virtual May Bumps.

== Links to races in other years ==
Preceding year	Current year	Following year
Lent Bumps 2020	Lent Bumps 2021 (cancelled)	Lent Bumps 2022
May Bumps 2020 (cancelled)	May Bumps 2021 (cancelled)	May Bumps 2022

== See also ==
- Impact of the COVID-19 pandemic on sports
- May Bumps 2020
- May Bumps 2021
