= May Bumps 2020 =

Cancelled rowing races at Cambridge University

The May Bumps 2020 were a set of rowing races at Cambridge University scheduled to take place from Wednesday 10 June 2020 to Saturday 13 June 2020. The event was to be run as a bumps race and would have been the 129th set of races in the series of May Bumps which had been held annually in mid-June since 1887. The 2020 races were due to be the first in which the women's divisions were to be held following the respective men's divisions, following a CUCBC rule change in June 2019 such that the final division should alternate between men's and women's divisions each year.

As a result of the COVID-19 pandemic, it was announced that the races were cancelled on 8 April 2020, and a set of virtual races were held in their place.

== Cancellation ==
On 18 March 2020 the University of Cambridge announced that students would not return to Cambridge after the Easter vacation due to the travel restrictions imposed by the UK government as a result of the worsening COVID-19 pandemic. Although it had been widely anticipated since this announcement from the University, CUCBC issued a statement on 8 April 2020 officially cancelling the May Bumps. This was the first time the May Bumps had been cancelled since 1940 as a result of the Second World War, although the Lent Bumps had experienced a partial cancellation as recently as 2018 due to adverse weather conditions.

== Virtual May Bumps 2020 ==
The Virtual May Bumps 2020 was organised by an intercollegiate group of students independently of CUCBC, the body which usually organises university bumps races in Cambridge, and was held two weeks after the cancelled event from Wednesday 24 June 2020 to Saturday 27 June 2020. Participants recorded and submitted times taken to run 800 metres, which formed the input to a computer simulation which calculated the results of each day of racing based on the speed of each crew. The virtual nature of the competition allowed mixed, alumni and university crews to compete alongside regular student crews, and in total 35 men's crews and 35 women's crews registered to compete, as well as 27 crews in the miscellaneous division. Results were broadcast exclusively on Cam FM, with the men's division preceding the women's division to reflect the planned order of racing in the cancelled event.

The starting order of the men's and women's divisions was based on the finishing order of the May Bumps 2019, with the start order of the miscellaneous division being randomised. The event saw Downing M1 claim headship of the men's division from Caius M1, while Newnham W1 retained headship of the women's division, and the Pemgibeers of Pembroke College rose from third position to claim the headship of the miscellaneous division.

The event also raised around £6,000 for charitable causes.

== Links to races in other years ==
Preceding year	Current year	Following year
May Bumps 2019	May Bumps 2020 (cancelled)	May Bumps 2021 (cancelled)
Lent Bumps 2019	Lent Bumps 2020	Lent Bumps 2021 (cancelled)

== See also ==
- Impact of the COVID-19 pandemic on sports
- Lent Bumps 2021
- May Bumps 2021
- The Boat Race 2020
