= Lent Bumps 2019 =

The Lent Bumps 2019 was a series of rowing races at Cambridge University from Tuesday 5 March 2019 to Saturday 9 March 2019. The event was run as a bumps race and was the 132nd set of races in the series of Lent Bumps which have been held annually in late February or early March since 1887. See Lent Bumps for the format of the races.

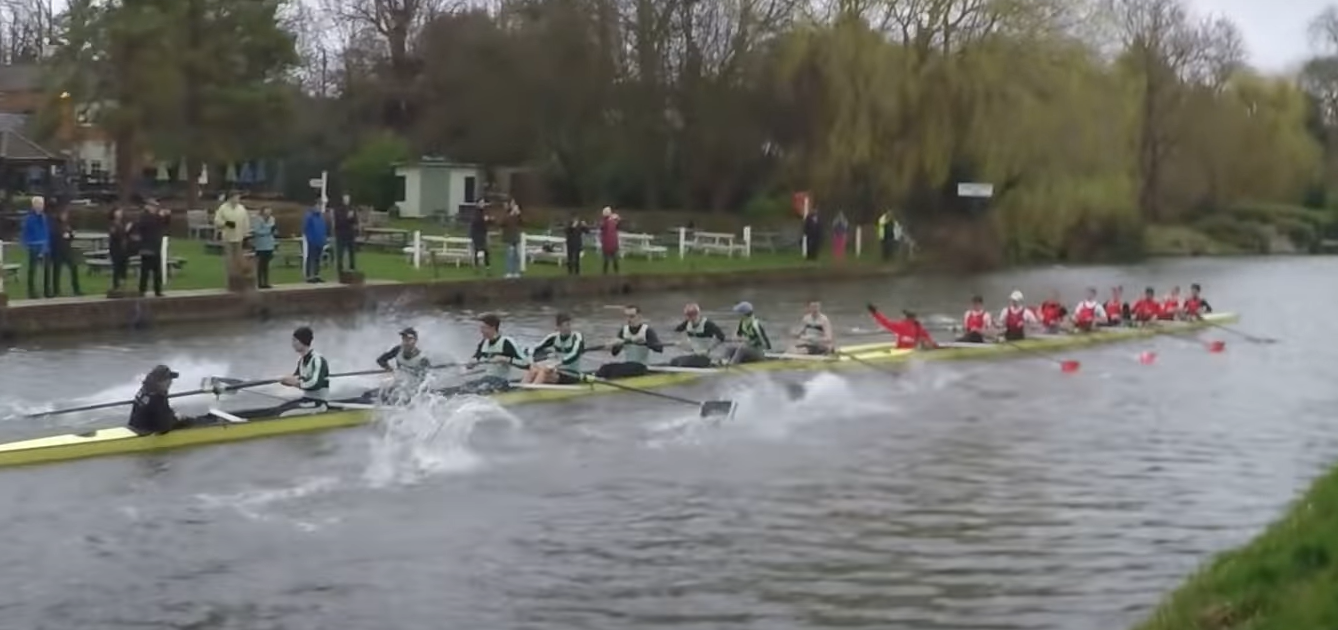
Lent bumps 2019: Caius bump LMBC outside the Plough, Wednesday

== Head of the River crews ==
Caius bumped Lady Margaret outside the Plough on day 1, claiming the headship that Lady Margaret had held since 2017.

Newnham bumped Downing and Jesus on the first and second days respectively to claim the headship that Jesus had held since 2016, and reclaiming the Lents Headship for the first time since 1983.

== Highest 2nd VIIIs ==
Lady Margaret II bumped Corpus Christi, Caius II, Wolfson and Girton, becoming the highest placed men's second VIII and finishing in 2nd position in the second division.

Jesus II were bumped by Darwin on day 1 and Sidney Sussex on day 4, but retained their position as the highest placed women's second VIII at 7th position in the second division.

== Links to races in other years ==
Preceding year	Current year	Following year
Lent Bumps 2018	Lent Bumps 2019	Lent Bumps 2020
May Bumps 2018	May Bumps 2019	May Bumps 2020 (cancelled)
