= The Boat Race 1965 =

111th Boat Race
- Date: 3 April 1965
- Winner: Oxford
- Margin of victory: 4 lengths
- Winning time: 18 minutes 7 seconds
- Overall record (Cambridge–Oxford): 61–49
- Umpire: G. A. Ellison (Oxford)

Other races
- Reserve winner: Isis
- Women's winner: Cambridge

The 111th Boat Race took place on 3 April 1965. Held annually, the event is a side-by-side rowing race between crews from the Universities of Oxford and Cambridge along the River Thames. The race was won by Oxford, who led from the start, by three-and-three-quarter-lengths, in the third fastest time in Boat Race history. Isis won the inaugural reserve race while Cambridge won the Women's Boat Race.

== Background ==
The Boat Race is a side-by-side rowing competition between the University of Oxford (sometimes referred to as the "Dark Blues") and the University of Cambridge (sometimes referred to as the "Light Blues"). The race was first held in 1829, and since 1845 has taken place on the 4.2-mile (6.8 km) Championship Course on the River Thames in southwest London. The rivalry is a major point of honour between the two universities, followed throughout the United Kingdom and broadcast worldwide. Cambridge went into the race as reigning champions, having won the previous year's race by six-and-half lengths, and led overall in the event with 61 victories to Oxford's 48 (excluding the "dead heat" of 1877).

The first Women's Boat Race took place in 1927, but did not become an annual fixture until the 1960s. Until 2014, the contest was conducted as part of the Henley Boat Races, but as of the 2015 race, it is held on the River Thames, on the same day as the men's main and reserve races. It was the first year of the reserve race, contested between Oxford's Isis boat and Cambridge's Goldie boat. According to author and journalist Christopher Dodd, allowing the reserves to race on the Tideway was "a curtain-raiser to the battle of the blues and to give the up-and-coming men some experience of the Putney razzle-dazzle". Since then, it has usually taken place on the Thames, prior to the main Boat Race.

The main race was umpired by Gerald Ellison who had rowed for Oxford in the 1932 and 1933 races. Cambridge's coaching team comprised Derek Mays-Smith, Chris Addison, J. R. F. Best, James Crowden, David Jennens, J. J. Vernon (who rowed in the 1955 race) and Ian Welsh, while Oxford were led by Ronnie Howard. In preparation for the race, Oxford put in "mile after mile of hard rowing" while Cambridge focused on the more technical aspects of training. On 19 March, Oxford beat the existing course record during the lead-up to the race, while Cambridge surpassed their own record two days later.

== Crews ==
The Cambridge crew weighed an average of 13 st 8.25 lb (86.1 kg), almost 4 pounds (1.8 kg) per rower more than their opponents. Oxford saw four former Blues return, rowers Sean Morris, Miles Morland and Duncan Spencer (rowing in his third race), and cox M. J. Leigh. Cambridge's crew included two returning Boat Race veterans in rower and boat club president Joe Fraser and cox Robert Stanbury. The Light Blue crew contained a single foreign-registered rower in Australian D. P. Moore while the Dark Blues included four Americans, all formerly of Yale University. According to the journalist Stanley Baker, writing in The Guardian, the Dark Blues were the "strongest and toughest crew Oxford have sent to the Tideway since the war."

Seat	Oxford			Cambridge		
Seat	Name	College	Weight	Name	College	Weight
Bow	S. R. Morris	St Edmund Hall	12 st 8 lb	J. A. Fell	Pembroke	13 st 0 lb
2	D. J. Mills	St Edmund Hall	13 st 8 lb	D. J. Roberts	St Catharine's	13 st 6 lb
3	R. D. Clegg	St Edmund Hall	12 st 12 lb	M. W. J. Carter	Pembroke	13 st 11.5 lb
4	M. Q. Morland (P)	Lincoln	13 st 8 lb	J. W. Fraser (P)	Jesus	14 st 4 lb
5	W. R. Fink	Keble	13 st 2 lb	R. G. Ward	Queens'	14 st 10 lb
6	H. W. Howell	St Edmund Hall	14 st 5 lb	W. E. Church	1st & 3rd Trinity	13 st 10 lb
7	D. C. Spencer	Christ Church	13 st 0 lb	D. P. Moore	St Catharine's	13 st 3 lb
Stroke	E. S. Trippe	St Edmund Hall	13 st 5	M. A. Sweeney	Lady Margaret Boat Club	12 st 8 lb
Cox	M. J. Leigh	Keble	9 st 0 lb	R. G. Stanbury	Lady Margaret Boat Club	9 st 2 lb
Source: (P) – Boat club president

== Race ==
The Championship Course along which the Boat Race is contested

Oxford, who were considered strong favourites, won the toss and elected to start from the Surrey station. The race commenced at 2.50pm. Oxford took an early lead and were half a length ahead at Craven Cottage. Cambridge drew back into contention and were nearly level as the crews passed the Mile Post, recording the same times. A push from Oxford saw them move away from Cambridge with a lead of two lengths by Hammersmith Bridge. Although increasing their rate to try to reduce the deficit, Cambridge's rowing became untidy and Oxford were able to capitalise, passing Chiswick Steps with a lead of three lengths, and shooting Barnes Bridge four up. Passing the finishing post with a lead of 15 seconds, Oxford won by four lengths in a time of 18 minutes 7 seconds, the third-fastest time in the history of the event, slower only than Cambridge's winning times in the 1934 and 1938 races. A correspondent writing in The Times suggested that "if there were any surprises at all ... they were that this notoriously fickle event went so exactly to form."

In the first reserve race, Oxford's Isis beat Cambridge's Goldie by two lengths, in a time of 18 minutes 45 seconds. In the 20th running of the Women's Boat Race, Cambridge triumphed, their third consecutive victory.
