= Gerald Ellison =

English Anglican bishop (1910–1992)

The Right Reverend and Right Honourable Gerald Ellison KCVO PC
- Bishop of London
- Church: Church of England
- Diocese: Diocese of London
- In office: 1973–1981
- Predecessor: Robert Stopford
- Successor: Graham Leonard
- Other posts: Bishop of Willesden (1950–1955); Bishop of Chester (1955–1973)

Orders
- Ordination: 1935 (deacon); 1936 (priest)
- Consecration: c. 1950

Personal details
- Born: 19 August 1910
- Died: 18 October 1992 (aged 82)
- Denomination: Anglican
- Residence: Fulham Palace, London, United Kingdom
- Education: New College, Oxford

Gerald Alexander Ellison KCVO PC (19 August 1910 – 18 October 1992) was an Anglican bishop and rower. He was the Bishop of Chester from 1955 to 1973 and the Bishop of London from 1973 to 1981.

== Early life and education ==
Ellison was the son of a chaplain to the king. He was educated at Westminster School and New College, Oxford. He rowed for Oxford University Boat Club in the Boat Race in 1932 and 1933 and was later a Boat Race umpire. He married Jane Gibbon and they had three children, two daughters and a son.

== Ordained ministry ==
Ellison studied for ordination at Westcott House, Cambridge and was ordained deacon in 1935 and priest in 1936. His first position, from 1935, was as a curate at Sherborne. He then became the chaplain to Cyril Garbett, Bishop of Winchester, from 1937 to 1939. During World War II he was a chaplain in the Royal Naval Volunteer Reserve and in 1943 the domestic chaplain to Cyril Garbett as Archbishop of York. From 1946 to 1950 he was vicar of St Mark's Portsea, Portsmouth, the largest parish of the city.

=== Episcopal ministry ===
In 1950, Ellison was consecrated to the episcopate as Bishop of Willesden, a suffragan bishop in the Diocese of London. In 1955 he became the Bishop of Chester, (in which capacity he blessed a nuclear submarine at Birkenhead) and then, in 1972, the Bishop of London, where he completed a move from Fulham Palace to a residence in Westminster. Another lasting legacy of his in the Diocese of London is the area scheme he began. He was appointed a Knight Commander of the Royal Victorian Order in 1981 and after retirement was for a short time vicar general in the extraprovincial Diocese of Bermuda.

== See also ==
- List of Oxford University Boat Race crews

Church of England titles
Preceded by Michael Gresford Jones	Bishop of Willesden; 1950–1955	Succeeded by George Ingle
Preceded by Douglas Crick	Bishop of Chester; 1955–1973	Succeeded by Hubert Whitsey
Preceded by Robert Stopford	Bishop of London; 1973–1981	Succeeded by Graham Leonard
