= Cambridge University Combined Boat Clubs =

Cambridge University Combined Boat Clubs (CUCBC) is responsible for the day-to-day running of college rowing in Cambridge, England. It is also responsible for organising May and Lent bumps which are the main races of the Easter and Lent terms respectively.

== Foundation of the CUCBC ==
Historically, only men's rowing existed at Cambridge University, and all of the races and river rules were controlled by the Cambridge University Boat Club (CUBC). Newnham College Boat Club was the only rowing club for women from its founding in 1893 until Cambridge University Women's Boat Club (CUWBC) was founded in 1941. Separate women's races began in the 1970s, controlled by the Cambridge University Women's Boat Club. The two organising bodies had differing rules of the river and arrangements for racing, leading to many potential problems. Initially, the number of women racing was small, but it soon grew to a similar number as that of the men. A vote was held on passing control for the women's racing to the CUBC in the 1980s, thereby bringing all control to a single entity, but this proposal was rejected by members of the CUBC. By the mid-1990s, the CUCBC was founded to oversee all river regulations, for rowers of both sexes, on the River Cam and to control the bumps races and various other events. This also had the effect that the CUBC and CUWBC were then free to concentrate on The Boat Race and Henley Boat Races respectively.

== Executive Committee ==
The CUCBC Committee consists of the following positions:

- Chair
- Senior Treasurer
- CUCBC Honorary Secretary
- CUCBC Events Secretary
- CUCBC Coxing Representative
- CUBC Honorary Secretary
- Webmaster
- Executive Committee Members

There also exists a Senior Committee with responsibility for strategic and longer-term issues affecting University and College rowing on the Cam.

== Events ==
CUCBC runs four main events during the course of the academic year:

- University IVs (Michaelmas Term)
- Lent Bumps (6th/7th Week, Lent Term)
- Small Boats Regatta (0th Week, Easter Term)
- May Bumps (7th-8th Week, Easter Term)

== Clubs ==
Name	Blade
Addenbrooke's Intercollegiate Boat Club	
Anglia Ruskin Boat Club	
Caius Boat Club	
Cambridge University Boat Club	
Christ's College Boat Club	
Churchill College Boat Club	
Clare Boat Club	
Clare Hall Boat Club	
Corpus Christi College Boat Club (Cambridge)	
Darwin College Boat Club	
Downing College Boat Club	
Emmanuel Boat Club	
First and Third Trinity Boat Club	
Fitzwilliam College Boat Club	
Girton College Boat Club	
Homerton College Boat Club	
Hughes Hall Boat Club	
Jesus College Boat Club (Cambridge)	
King's College Boat Club	
Lady Margaret Boat Club	
Lucy Cavendish College Boat Club	
Magdalene Boat Club	
Murray Edwards College Boat Club	
Newnham College Boat Club	
Pembroke College Boat Club	
Peterhouse Boat Club	
Queens' College Boat Club	
Robinson College Boat Club	
Selwyn College Boat Club	
Sidney Sussex Boat Club	
St Catharine's College Boat Club (Cambridge)	
St Edmund's College Boat Club	
Trinity Hall Boat Club	
Vet School Boat Club	
Wolfson College Boat Club	
