= The Boat Race 1957 =

103rd Boat Race
- Date: 30 March 1957
- Winner: Cambridge
- Margin of victory: 2 lengths
- Winning time: 19 minutes 1 second
- Overall record (Cambridge–Oxford): 57–45
- Umpire: Gerald Ellison (Oxford)

The 103rd Boat Race took place on 30 March 1957. Held annually, the Boat Race is a side-by-side rowing race between crews from the Universities of Oxford and Cambridge along the River Thames. The race was umpired by former Oxford rower Gerald Ellison. Despite Oxford being favourites and with the heaviest crew in the history of the event, Cambridge won by two lengths in a time of 19 minutes 1 second. The victory took the overall record to 57–45 in their favour.

== Background ==
The Boat Race is a side-by-side rowing competition between the University of Oxford (sometimes referred to as the "Dark Blues") and the University of Cambridge (sometimes referred to as the "Light Blues"). First held in 1829, the race takes place on the 4.2-mile (6.8 km) Championship Course on the River Thames in southwest London. The rivalry is a major point of honour between the two universities; it is followed throughout the United Kingdom and, as of 2014, broadcast worldwide. Cambridge went into the race as reigning champions, having won the 1956 race by 1 1/4 lengths, and led overall with 56 victories to Oxford's 45 (excluding the "dead heat" of 1877).

Cambridge's coaches were James Crowden (who had rowed for the Light Blues in the 1951 and 1952 races), D. K. Hill (who had rowed for Cambridge in 1953 and 1954), Derek Mays-Smith (who had represented Cambridge in the 1955 and 1956 races and James Owen. Oxford were coached by J. H. Page, L. A. F. Stokes (a Dark Blue in 1951 and 1952) and R. A. Wheadon (who had rowed in the 1954 race). The race was umpired by Gerald Ellison, the Bishop of Chester, who had rowed for Oxford in the 1932 and 1933 races.

According to the rowing correspondent of The Times, "never in the past 10 years has there been such unanimity in Boat Race forecasts as this year, when only the staunchest Cambridge supporters could see more than an outside chance of a light blue victory". He described the Oxford crew as "exceptionally strong and mechanically quite efficient" yet "lacks polish and uniformity" and while Cambridge were demonstrated uniformity, they rowed in a way which "does look like hard work". In the build-up to the race, Oxford's time in their second full course row was 45 seconds quicker than that rowed by Cambridge the previous day.

== Crews ==
The Oxford crew weighed an average of 13 st 3 lb (83.7 kg), 5.75 pounds (2.6 kg) per rower more than their opponents, making them the heaviest crew on record. Cambridge's crew featured a single rower with Boat Race experience: their number six and boat club president Michael Delahooke had rowed in the previous year's race. Oxford saw four rowers return who had previously participated in the event. Two members of each crew were registered as non-British: Oxford's Roderick Carnegie was Australian while their cox A. Said was from Pakistan. Cambridge's crew included two Americans in J. R. Meadows and their cox R. C. Milton.

Seat	Oxford			Cambridge		
Seat	Name	College	Weight	Name	College	Weight
Bow	G. Sorrell	Christ Church	12 st 1 lb	M. H. Bartlett	Peterhouse	11 st 8 lb
2	S. F. A. Miskin	University	12 st 8 lb	C. J. Pumphrey	Magdalene	12 st 1 lb
3	R. L. Howard	Worcester	13 st 5 lb	J. A. Pitchford	Christ's	13 st 3 lb
4	A. H. Stearns	Merton	13 st 12 lb	T. P. A. Norman	1st & 3rd Trinity	13 st 3 lb
5	P. F. Barnard	Christ Church	14 st 3 lb	J. R. Meadows	Jesus	14 st 0 lb
6	R. Barrett	Pembroke	14 st 5 lb	M. G. Delahooke (P)	Jesus	13 st 0 lb
7	R. H. Carnegie (P)	New College	13 st 10 lb	J. M. Thompson	Pembroke	12 st 5 lb
Stroke	K. L. Mason	Queen's	11 st 9 lb	F. C. S. Clayre	Queens'	12 st 6 lb
Cox	A. Said	Pembroke	7 st 11 lb	R. C. Milton	Emmanuel	9 st 4 lb
Source: (P) – boat club president

== Race ==
The Championship Course along which the Boat Race is contested

Oxford won the toss and elected to start from the Middlesex station, handing the Surrey side of the river to Cambridge. Both crews rowed 38 strokes in the first minute, with the Light Blues holding a canvas-length lead. While Oxford dropped their stroke rate to 32 strokes per minute, Cambridge continued at pace, rating 35 strokes per minute in an attempt to extend their early lead through to Beverley Brook. Oxford's longer stroke saw them pass Cambridge to pass the Mile Post around a length ahead. At the Crab Tree pub, Cambridge pushed on while the Dark Blues maintained their rhythm, with the rowing correspondent for The Times suggesting this was "Oxford's tactical error".

The Dark Blues' lead was down to half a length by the time the crews passed Harrods Furniture Depository and by Hammersmith Bridge Cambridge had edged ahead. Still out-rating Oxford, the Light Blues gradually pulled away and were a length and a half ahead by Chiswick Steps. With no response from Oxford, Cambridge extended their advantage further to around two lengths by Barnes Bridge, a lead which they held at the finishing post in a time of 19 minutes 1 second. They secured their third consecutive victory and their ninth win in eleven years and taking the overall record in the race to 57–45 in their favour. At the post-race dinner, held at the Royal Automobile Club in Pall Mall, the Oxford boat club president Carnegie defended his crew's style: "The style was all right but we did not match up to it". His counterpart Delahooke suggested that had the race been held ten days prior, Oxford would have won.
