= Queens' College Boat Club =

Rowing club for members of Queens' College, Cambridge

Queens' College Boat Club, Cambridge

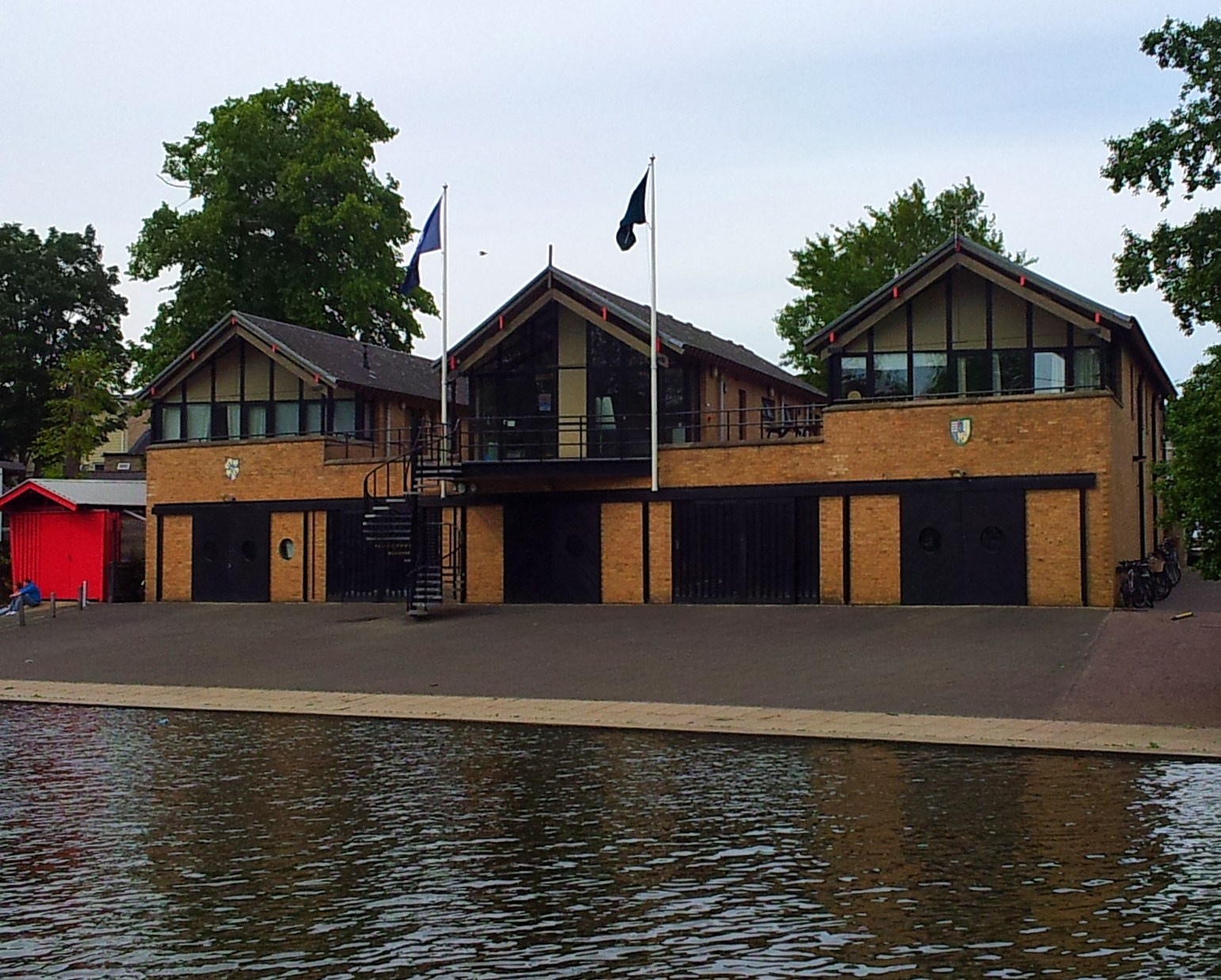

- Motto: Vis Apri ("Power of the Boar")
- Location: Cambridge, England
- Coordinates: 52°12′48.13″N 0°7′36.03″E
- Home water: River Cam
- Founded: 1828
- Affiliations: British Rowing CUCBC
- Website: qcbc.soc.srcf.net

Events
- Queens' Ergs

Queens' College Boat Club (QCBC) is the rowing club for members of Queens' College, Cambridge. The men's club have won the May Bumps three times (1962, 1963 and 1968) and the Lent Bumps once in 1968.

== History ==
In the men's May Bumps, the 1st VIII took the headship for the first time in 1962, achieving the rare feat of four consecutive bumps to do so. This had only ever been achieved once before, by Lady Margaret Boat Club in 1950. Queens' retained the Mays Headship in 1963, and went head again in 1968 when they were also head in the Lent Bumps. In the men's Lent Bumps, the Queens' 1st VIII largely remained in the 2nd division until about 1910, when they moved up into the 1st division. With only occasional years where the 1st VIII dropped into the 2nd division, the club eventually rose to take the headship in 1968, but lost it the following year (dropping four places) and declined into the 2nd division by 1980. Since then, the form has been somewhat erratic, rising to 3rd in 1995 before plummeting into the 2nd division again by 2000. Queens' ended a good run of form in 2007, having risen back into the mid-1st division, they crashed down four places and were awarded spoons, dropping another three places the following year.

The Queens' 1st women first appeared in 1981, and rose as high as 2nd in the Lent Bumps and 4th in the May Bumps, but have yet to take a headship in either event.

In December 2009, the men became the first ever crew to win the Fairbairn Cup. This came after a term's racing in which Queens' also won the University IVs First and Second Men's divisions.

The current positions of the men's 1st VIII are 16th in the Lent Bumps and 14th in the May Bumps. The 1st women's VIII currently reside near the bottom of the 1st division in the Lent Bumps and May Bumps, being 15th and 17th, respectively.

== Queens' Ergs ==
The Queens' College Boat Club hosts the annual Queens' Ergs competition in the Michaelmas Term, an 8x500m indoor rowing relay race open to novices (those who have begun rowing that term) only. It usually attracts over 1000 rowers, and is one of the largest indoor rowing events in the United Kingdom.

== Honours ==
=== Henley Royal Regatta ===
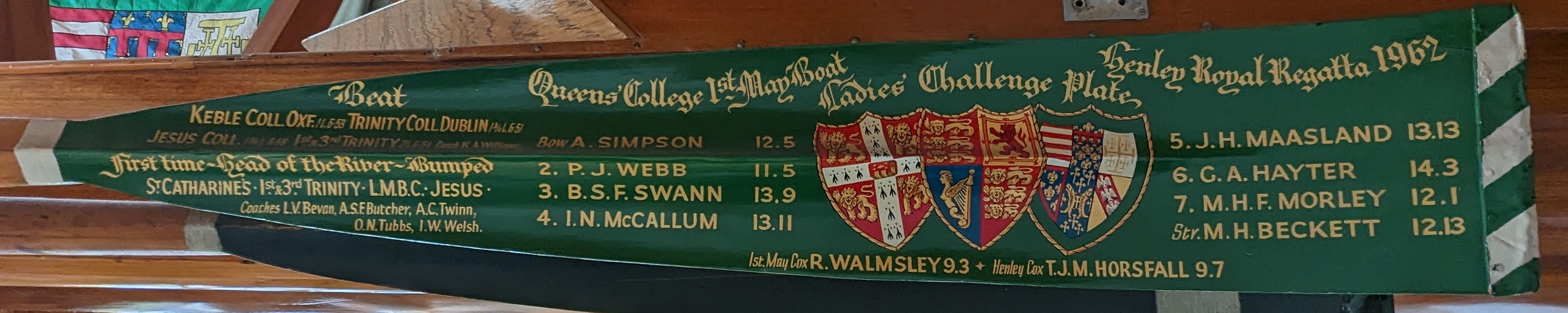
Queens' college blade, 1962

Year	Races won
1912	Wyfold Challenge Cup
1955	Ladies' Challenge Plate
1962	Ladies' Challenge Plate
1963	Thames Challenge Cup

=== Boat Race representatives ===
The following rowers were part of the rowing club at the time of their participation in The Boat Race.

Men's boat race

Year	Name
1880	W. M. Warlow
1880	R. D. Prior
1886	G. H. Baker (cox)
1887	G. H. Baker (cox)
1889	T. W. Northmore (cox)
1890	T. W. Northmore (cox)
1931	G. Gray
1947	A. S. F. Butcher
1948	P. A. de Giles
1956	I. W. Welsh
1957	F. C. S. Clayre
1962	R. Walmsley
1963	P. J. Webb
1963	J. Maasland
1963	M. H. Beckett
1964	A. Simpson
1965	R. G. Ward
1966	R. G. Ward

Year	Name
1970	C. J. Dalley
1970	N. G. Hughes
1971	N. G. Hughes
1972	N. G. Hughes
1976	M. R. Gritten
1982	S. A. Harris
1983	S. A. Harris
1995	Miles P. C. Barnett
1996	Miles P. C. Barnett
2003	Kristopher Coventry
2004	Kristopher Coventry
2014	Ian Middleton (cox)
2015	William Warr
2015	Ian Middleton (cox)
2016	Ian Middleton (cox)
2017	Tim Tracey
2023	Brett Taylor

Women's boat race

Year	Name
2019	Laura Foster
2022	Ruby Tew
2022	Grace Prendergast
