= The Boat Race 1976 =

122nd Boat Race
- Date: 20 March 1976
- Winner: Oxford
- Margin of victory: 6 1/2 lengths
- Winning time: 16 minutes 58 seconds
- Overall record (Cambridge–Oxford): 68–53
- Umpire: P. N. Carpmael (Cambridge)

Other races
- Reserve winner: Isis
- Women's winner: Oxford

The 122nd Boat Race, an annual side-by-side rowing race between crews from the Universities of Oxford and Cambridge along the River Thames, took place on 20 March 1976 and was won by Oxford by 6 1/2 lengths in 16 minutes 58 seconds, the fastest time in the history of the race. The race was umpired by former Cambridge rower Farn Carpmael. It was the first race in the event for which an official weigh-in was held, and featured the heaviest rower ever in Steve Plunkett.

Oxford's Isis won the 12th running of the reserve race against Cambridge's Goldie, in a record time of 17 minutes 37 seconds. In the 31st Women's Boat Race, Oxford defeated Cambridge.

== Background ==
The Boat Race is a side-by-side rowing competition between the University of Oxford (sometimes referred to as the "Dark Blues") and the University of Cambridge (sometimes referred to as the "Light Blues"). The race was first held in 1829, and since 1845 has taken place on the 4.2-mile (6.8 km) Championship Course on the River Thames in southwest London. The rivalry is a "hotly contested point of honour" between the two universities. Cambridge went into the race as reigning champions, having won the 1975 race by 5 1/2 lengths, and led overall with 68 victories to Oxford's 52 (excluding the "dead heat" of 1877). The umpire for the race was Farn Carpmael, who had rowed for Cambridge in the 1930 and 1931 races.

The first Women's Boat Race took place in 1927, but did not become an annual fixture until the 1960s. Up until 2014, the contest was conducted as part of the Henley Boat Races, but as of the 2015 race, it is held on the River Thames, on the same day as the men's main and reserve races. The reserve race, contested between Oxford's Isis boat and Cambridge's Goldie boat has been held since 1965. It usually takes place on the Tideway, prior to the main Boat Race.

By invitation from the Oxford boat club president Graham Innes, Oxford were coached by Daniel Topolski (who had rowed for the Dark Blues in the 1967 and 1968 races) while Cambridge were led by Czechoslovak former international rower Bohumil Janoušek (more commonly known as Bob Janousek). Preparations during the week before the race were underwhelming for both crews. Oxford's performance against a University of London crew was described by Jim Railton of The Times as "abysmal" while Cambridge "disgraced themselves" in a subsequent two-and-a-half-length defeat by their own reserve crew, Goldie. Both crews had faced the "Lubrication Laboratory" crew from Imperial College London, a "hotbed of rowing", in the lead-up to the official race, but changes in personnel and differences in conditions and race lengths did not demonstrate a clear favourite.

The day before the race, British bookmaking company Ladbrokes announced that they would sponsor the race from the following year. From 1977, each boat club would be awarded £10,000 and would compete for The Ladbroke Cup.

== Crews ==
For the first time in the history of the event, an official weigh-in was held, organised by The Sunday Times and weighing machine manufacturers W & T Avery Ltd. Oxford's crew was the heaviest of all time, at an average of just under 14 st 1 lb (89.0 kg) per rower, 4.5 pounds (2.0 kg) more than their opposition, and the first time in the race history, a crew weighed more than an average of 14 st (88.7 kg). The Dark Blue crew also included Steve Plunkett who, at 16 st 5 lb (103.6 kg) was the heaviest rower in the history of the race. The Cambridge crew were inexperienced, their only Blue being the Cambridge University Boat Club president Henry Clay who had rowed in the 1975 race. In contrast, Oxford welcomed back five of their 1975 crew including cox J. N. Calvert, and also included two from the victorious 1975 Isis crew. Two non-British rowers participated, Americans Dick Cashin (of Harvard) for Cambridge and Ken Brown (of Cornell) for Oxford.

Seat	Oxford			Cambridge		
Seat	Name	College	Weight	Name	College	Weight
Bow	D. R. H. Beak	Oriel	13 st 6 lb	D. J. Searle	St Catharine's	12 st 7 lb
2	G. S. Innes (P)	Oriel	13 st 10 lb	R. R. A. Breare	Pembroke	14 st 6 lb
3	A. D. Edwards	St Peters	13 st 0 lb	M. R. Gritten	Queens'	14 st 0 lb
4	R. S. Mason	Keble	13 st 6 lb	M. P. Wells	Selwyn	14 st 12 lb
5	S. G. H. Plunkett	Queen's	16 st 3 lb	P. B. Davies	1st & 3rd Trinity	14 st 1 lb
6	K. C. Brown	Christ Church	14 st 5 lb	R. M. Cashin	1st & 3rd Trinity	14 st 12 lb
7	A. J. Wiggins	Keble	13 st 5 lb	J. H. Clay (P)	Pembroke	12 st 11 lb
Stroke	A. G. H. Baird	Christ Church	12 st 10 lb	R. Harpum	Jesus	12 st 4 lb
Cox	J. N. Calvert	St Edmund Hall	9 st 4 lb	J. P. Manser	Sidney Sussex	9 st 5 lb
Source: (P) – boat club president

== Race ==
The Championship Course along which the Boat Race is contested

Oxford won the toss and elected to start from the Surrey station. Leading from the outset, and in calm river conditions, Oxford were a length ahead within a minute. Four lengths up by the Mile Post, which they reached in a record 3 minutes 35 seconds, the Dark Blues reduced their rating. Further milestone records were broken at Hammersmith Bridge, Chiswick Steps and Barnes Bridge. Oxford reduced their rating but still extended their lead to six lengths by the finishing post, in a record-breaking time of 16 minutes 58 seconds, 37 seconds quicker than their 1974 colleagues who had previously held the record. Although Cambridge also beat the existing record, they finished a distant 22 seconds and 6 1/2 lengths behind.

== Reaction ==
Oxford coach Topolski said of his successful crew: "they got three [lengths] up, then they really sat on it and cruised. The enjoyed the row. It's a natural thing when the other crew is so far behind." He was critical of the Cambridge crew: "They didn't really have a lot of talent."

The official winning distance caused controversy. A discrepancy between the official margin (6 1/2 lengths) and those reported in various British newspapers, including The Sunday Times, The Daily Telegraph and The Times resulted in a delay in bookmakers paying out on winning bets.
