= Newnham College Boat Club =

British rowing club

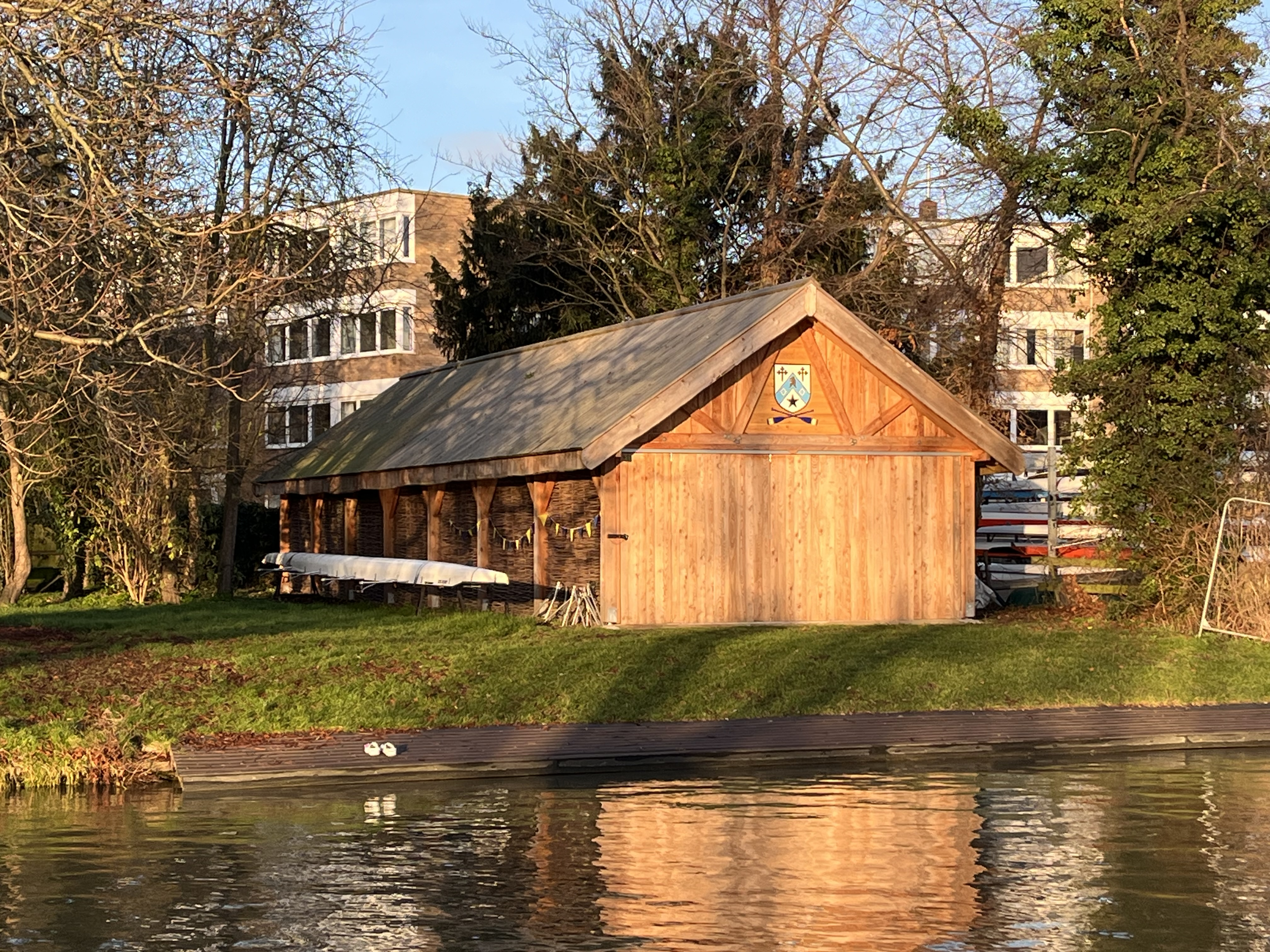

- Location: Cambridge, England
- Coordinates: 52°12′39.54″N 0°7′52.87″E
- Home water: River Cam
- Founded: 1893
- Affiliations: British Rowing, CUCBC
- Website: ncbc.soc.srcf.net

Events
- Newnham Head (Regatta)

Notable members
- Anna Watkins

Newnham College Boat Club is the rowing club for members of Newnham College, Cambridge. The club has a year-round senior squad and invites all members of the college to learn to row by joining the novice squads during Michaelmas or Easter terms.

In the Lent Bumps, the 1st VIII has rarely finished outside the top nine places, taking the headship in 1977, 1982, 1983, 2019 and 2022. In the May Bumps, the 1st IV and 1st VIII has never finished outside the top ten places, taking the headship in 1975, 1976, 2003, 2019 and 2022.

The club pioneered women's rowing at Cambridge University in the 19th and 20th centuries.

== History ==
Women students at Newnham were coxing in the 1870s and rowing in the 1880s. The club was founded in 1893, as the Newnham College Rowing Society, making it one of the oldest continuously existing all-women's rowing clubs in the world. (Note: In 1892, four young women started what became ZLAC Rowing Club in San Diego, California, which is thought to be the world's oldest continuously existing all-women's rowing club while Furnivall Sculling Club is widely considered to have established the world's first female rowing team (crew) in 1896.)

Newnham first bought an VIII from First Trinity in 1918, and in 1919 the club made its racing debut against the London School of Medicine for Women, winning on the Thames by 1¾ lengths. This was followed by Newnham's first race against men in 1920, losing to the Anglican theological college Ridley Hall. By 1922 a second VIII had been purchased from Eton.

Newnham College Boat Club represented Cambridge in the Women's Boat Race from the inaugural race in 1927 until the wartime foundation, in 1941, of the Cambridge University Women's Boat Club with members of Girton College, also catering (at that time) solely to women. All of the Cambridge rowers in 1941 were members of Newnham, the first non-Newnham rower (a Girtonian) competing the following year. The Cambridge victories in the early years, 1929 and 1930, were credited to Newnham College.

The first bumps races for women were held in 1974 and since then have continued to be major events in the club's calendar. In 1976 in the May Bumps, Newnham I were head on the 2nd day, and Newnham II were in 2nd position. No other women's club has managed to get a 2nd boat into 2nd place. The only men's club to have managed it was First Trinity, whose 2nd boat bumped its 1st boat in the 1875 races to finish in 2nd place behind Jesus. Newnham is, therefore, the only club (men or women) in the history of Cambridge Bumps racing to have held the top two places simultaneously.

In 2006 Newnham won the newly inaugurated Pegasus Cup for being "the most successful college boat club competing in the Cambridge May Bumping Races", with a points system that takes into account the number of boats competing in the races, thus favouring smaller boat clubs. They reclaimed the Cup in 2017. The May races in 2007 saw Newnham go up three places.

In 2009/10 Newnham won the Michell Cup, annually awarded by the CUCBC to the Boat Club giving the best performance on the river during the course of the academic year. Newnham retained the trophy in 2010/11 and the upwards trajectory in the Bumps tables was continued in 2011/12 when the first VIII finished at 3rd on the river.

In 2013 Newnham won the newly inaugurated Marconi Cup for being "the most successful college boat club competing in the Cambridge Lent Bumping Races".

In 2019, Newnham claimed headship in both the Lent and May Bumps, ending Jesus's two-year reign by bumping them in both events. This was Newnham's first Lents Headship since 1983, their first Mays Headship since 2003, and their first ever Double Headship (meaning holding Head position in both the Lents and May Bumps in the same year). Additionally in the May Bumps 2019, Newnham II claimed "W2 Headship" position, being the highest ranked W2 on the river. Having lost the Lents headship in 2020, Newnham regained it in 2022 before losing it again in 2023.

Since 2024, Newnham have maintained a boathouse on the River Cam, on a plot of land leased by Corpus Christi College and immediately adjacent to the Old Combined boathouse shared by Girton, Sidney Sussex, Wolfson, and Corpus Christi college boat clubs. The Newnham boathouse uses sustainable and locally sourced materials, including larch from the Rougham Estate, in Suffolk, and willow coppiced at nearby Grantchester.

== Honours ==
=== Boat Race representatives ===
The following rowers were part of the rowing club at the time of their participation in The Boat Race.

Women's boat race

Year	Name
2017	Anna Dawson
2019	Ida Gørtz Jacobsen
2021	Adriana Perez Rotondo
2021	Sarah Portsmouth
2021	Caoimhe Dempsey
2022	Adriana Perez Rotondo
2022	Sarah Portsmouth
2022	Caoimhe Dempsey
2023	Caoimhe Dempsey
2026	Charlotte Ebel

== See also ==
- University rowing in the United Kingdom
