= Pembroke College Boat Club (Cambridge) =

English Collegiate rowing club

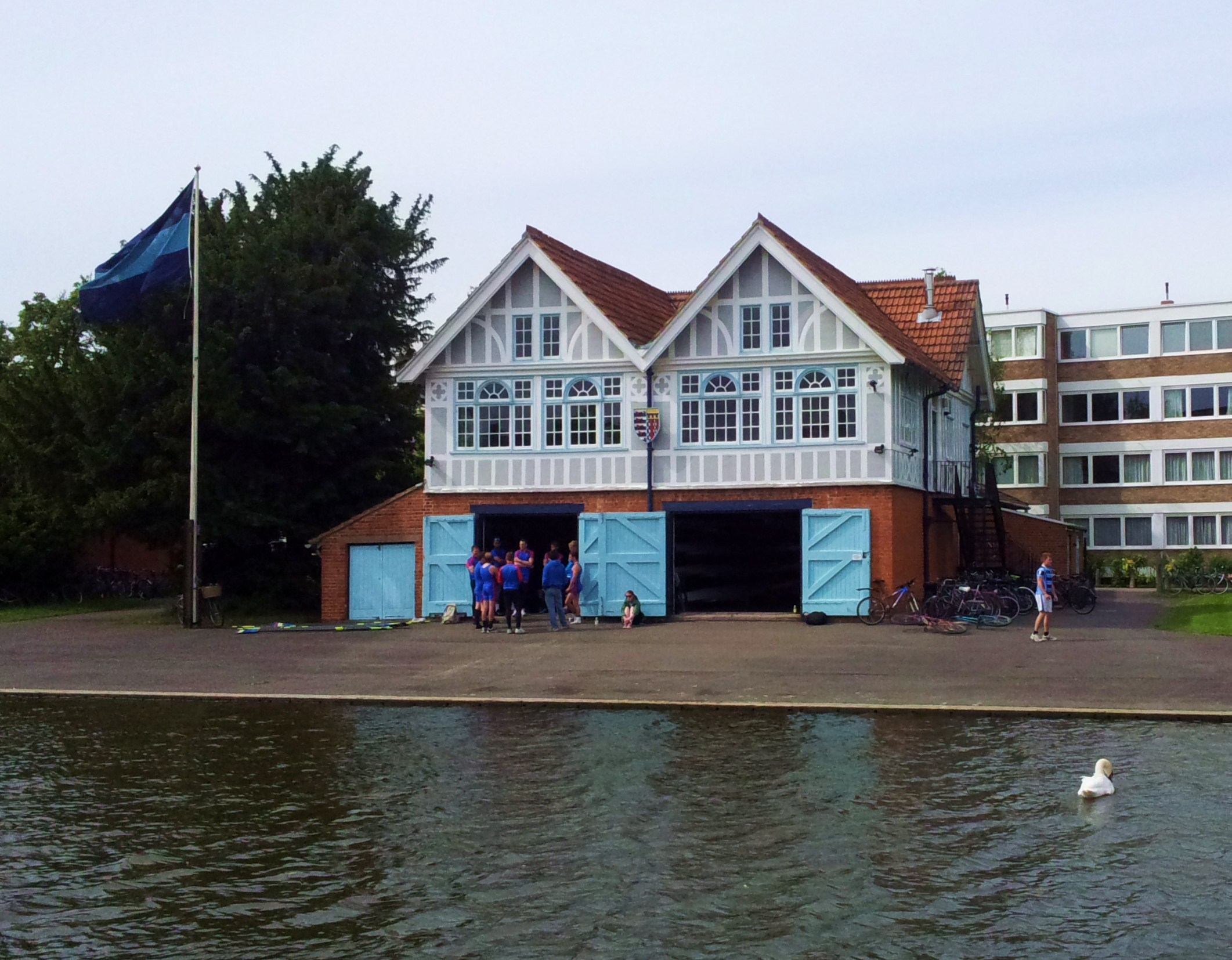

- Location: Cambridge, England
- Coordinates: 52°12′38.24″N 0°8′1.97″E
- Home water: River Cam
- Affiliations: British Rowing CUCBC
- Website: pembrokecollegeboatclub.com

Events
- Pembroke Regatta

Pembroke College Boat Club is the rowing club for members of Pembroke College, Cambridge. The club members are eligible to row for Cambridge University Boat Club.

== History ==
The club has a strong tradition of supplying rowers for The Boat Race, with the first being J. Wilson in the 1863 Boat Race.

Over the 20th century, crews from Pembroke have held the headship of the men's Lent Bumps on four occasions, and the headship of the men's May Bumps ten times. The men's 1st VIII spent their entire history in the 1st division of both events, apart from poor performances in the Lent Bumps 2000 and the May Bumps 2003, and the crew is usually found in the top half of the division. The women's 1st VIII first raced in 1985, and have not yet taken the headship of the Lent Bumps, but took the headship of the May Bumps in 1997, 1998, 2006, 2008, 2009 and 2010.

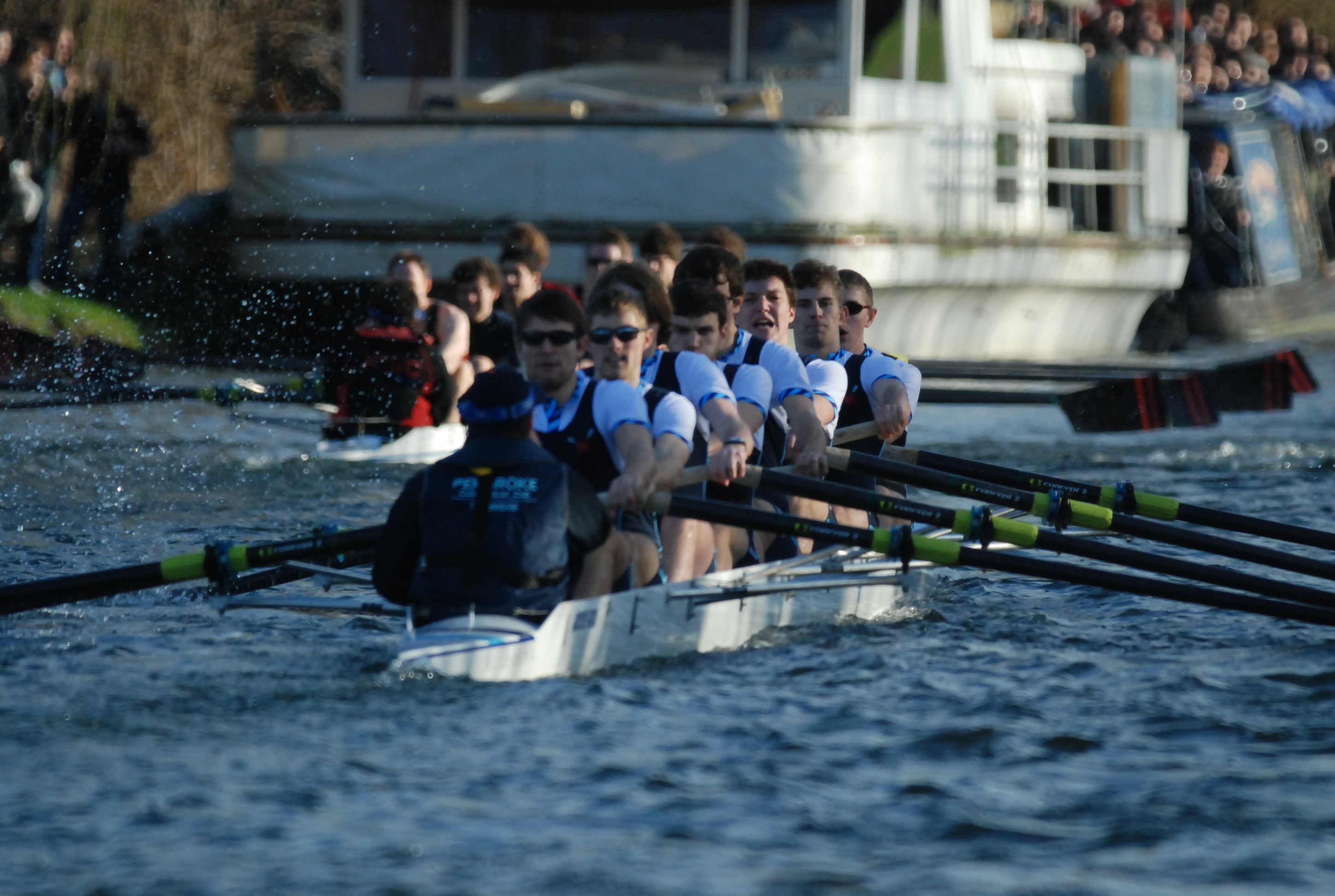
Chasing Jesus, Lent bumps 2012

== Honours ==
=== Henley Royal Regatta ===
Year	Races won
1886	Ladies' Challenge Plate
1887	Wyfold Challenge Cup
1911	Wyfold Challenge Cup
1913	Visitors' Challenge Cup
1914	Ladies' Challenge Plate
1931	Visitors' Challenge Cup
1933	Stewards' Challenge Cup
1934	Stewards' Challenge Cup
1935	Grand Challenge Cup
1951	Silver Goblets & Nickalls' Challenge Cup, Diamond Challenge Sculls, Ladies' Challenge Plate
1952	Visitors' Challenge Cup
1956	Silver Goblets & Nickalls' Challenge Cup
1957	Ladies' Challenge Plate, Visitors' Challenge Cup
1959	Visitors' Challenge Cup
1964	Ladies' Challenge Plate, Visitors' Challenge Cup
1974	Visitors' Challenge Cup

=== Boat Race representatives ===
The following rowers were part of the rowing club at the time of their participation in The Boat Race.

Men's boat race

Year	Name
1863	J. Wilson
1864	H. Watson
1868	H. T. Nadin
1881	E. Lambert
1882	E. Lambert
1911	P. V. G. Van der Byl
1912	H. M. Heyland
1913	C. S. Clark
1914	C. S. Clark
1920	J. H. Simpson
1921	A. G. W. Penney
1922	T. D. A. Collet
1922	K. N. Craig
1922	B. G. Ivory
1923	K. N. Craig
1923	B. G. Ivory
1923	T. D. A. Collet
1924	T. D. A. Collet
1924	A. B. Stobart
1927	T. E. Letchworth
1927	J. C. Holcroft
1928	J. C. Holcroft
1928	T. E. Letchworth
1931	J. M. Ranking (cox)
1932	W. A. T. Sambell
1932	D. H. E. McCowen
1932	L. Luxton
1932	J. M. Ranking (cox)
1933	W. A. T. Sambell

Year	Name
1934	A. D. Kingsford
1934	W. A. T. Sambell
1934	J. H. T. Wilson
1934	N. J. Bradley
1935	T. R. M. Bristow
1935	A. D. Kingsford
1935	D. G. Kingsford
1935	J. H. T. Wilson
1936	G. M. Lewis
1936	D. G. Kingsford
1936	J. H. T. Wilson
1937	M. Bradley
1951	J. G. P. Crowden
1951	J. F. K. Hinde (cox)
1952	E. J. N. T. Coghill
1952	J. G. P. Crowden
1952	J. F. K. Hinde (cox)
1953	B. M. Eddy (cox)
1954	J. C. G. Stancliffe
1957	J. M. Thompson
1958	D. C. Christie
1958	M. B. Maltby
1959	D. C. Christie
1959	M. B. Maltby
1965	J. A. Fell
1965	M. W. J. Carter
1967	W. R. Lawes (cox)
1973	H. R. Jacobs
1974	H. R. Jacobs

Year	Name
1974	J. H. Clay
1974	T. F. Yuncken
1974	N. C. A. Bradley
1975	N. C. A. Bradley
1975	J. H. Clay
1976	R. R. A. Breare
1976	J. H. Clay
1977	M. D. Bathurst
1978	M. D. Bathurst
1979	A. H. Grey
1979	J. S. Palmer
1980	J. S. Palmer
1981	J. S. Palmer
1984	A. H. Reynolds
1987	Julian M. Wolfson
2004	Wayne Pommen
2006	Kieran West
2007	Kieran West
2010	Peter McClelland
2012	Ed Bosson (cox)
2013	Grant Wilson
2013	Alexander Fleming

Women's boat race

Year	Name
2019	Lily Lindsay
2025	Jack Nicholas (cox)

== See also ==
- University rowing (UK)
