= Selwyn College Boat Club =

British rowing club

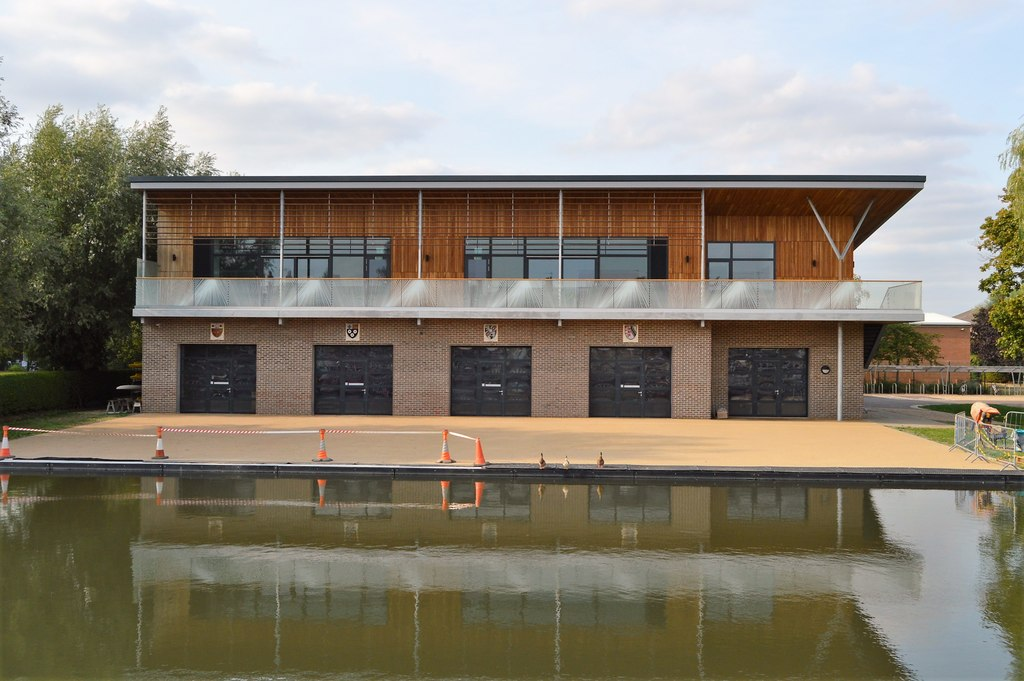

- The boathouse, shared with King's College and Churchill College
- Motto: Be Courageous!
- Location: Cambridge, England
- Coordinates: 52°12′41.17″N 0°8′21.59″E
- Home water: River Cam
- Founded: 1882
- Membership: University of Cambridge
- Affiliations: British Rowing CUCBC
- Website: www.selwynrowing.org.uk

Distinctions
- Blades (May and Lent Bumps)

Notable members
- Ran Laurie; Hugh Laurie; Richard Budgett

Selwyn College Boat Club (SCBC) is the rowing club for members of Selwyn College, Cambridge, a constituent college of the University of Cambridge. Notable alumni of the Selwyn College Boat Club include Hugh Laurie, Tom Hollander, and Richard Budgett.

Selwyn College rowers have not taken a headship (men's or women's) of the two bumps races. Selwyn College boats have had more success over the past several years, with the 1st Women's VIII earning blades in the 2023 Lent Bumps, and the 1st Men’s VIII earning blades in the Lent Bumps the following year.

== History ==
Selwyn College, Cambridge was named for Bishop George Augustus Selwyn, who was himself a Cambridge scholar and a rower for St John's College, Cambridge. Selwyn is the only College to be named after a scholar who was also a Rowing Blue. George Selwyn was a member of the Cambridge crew which competed in the inaugural Boat Race in 1829. The SCBC was established immediately after the May Bumps were moved to June, instead of the previous month (1882). It is unknown why this was done, but it is believed to pay homage to the Cambridge tradition of scholars publishing during the Lent Term.

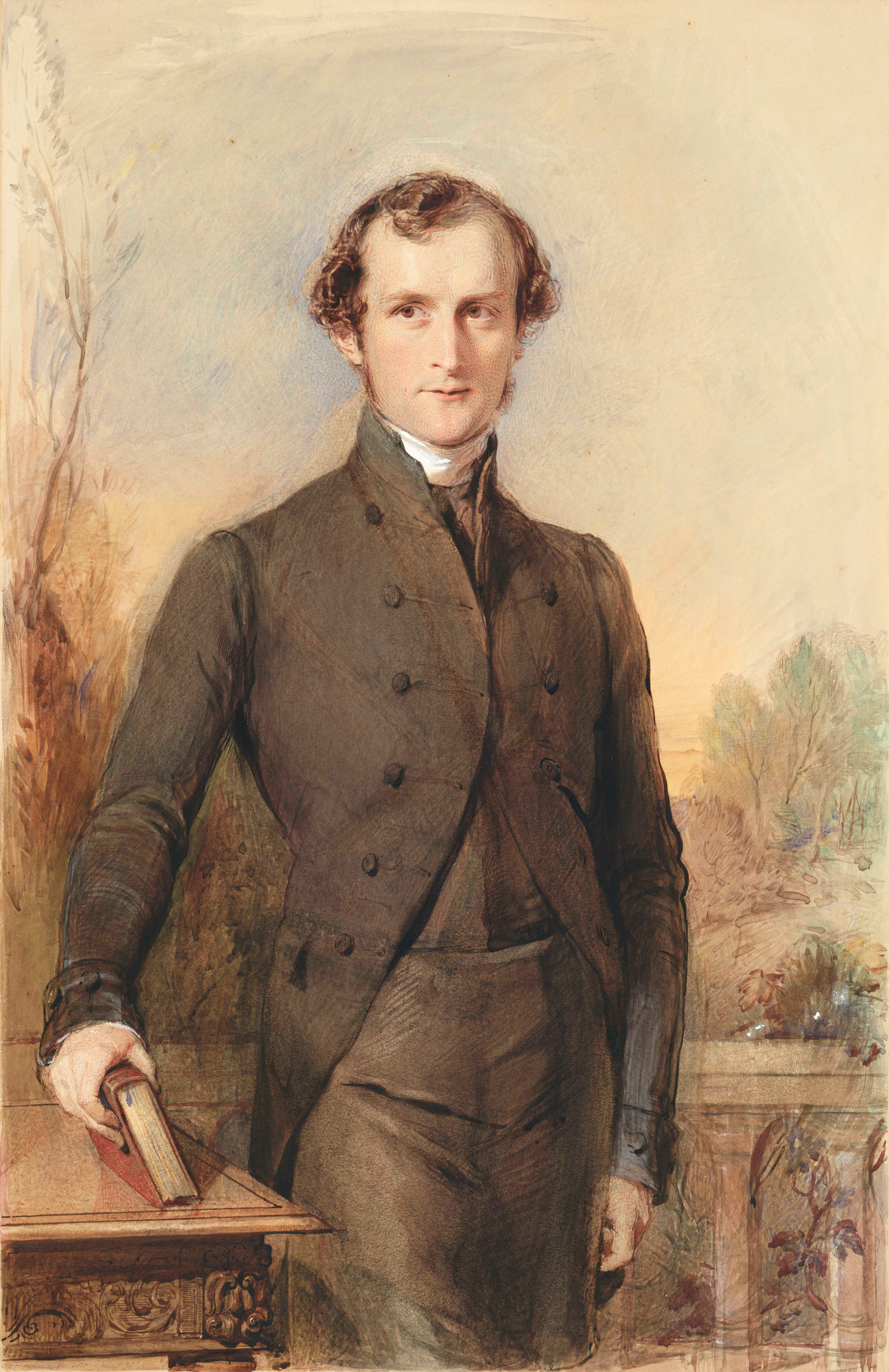
George Selwyn rowed for Cambridge against Oxford in 1829

In the early days of the Lent Bumps and May Bumps, Selwyn spent a lot of time in the 2nd division, but rose sharply from the mid-1920s, reaching 3rd in the May Bumps throughout the early 1930s and 2nd in the Lent Bumps in 1933. By 1958, Selwyn's 1st VIII had found its way back into the 2nd division. Selwyn once again gained 2nd place in the Lent Bumps in 1974 and 4th in the May Bumps in 1979, but has since fallen. The men's 1st VIII currently (as of December 2024) lies 17th in the 1st Division of Lent Bumps, and 11th in the 1st Division in the May Bumps.

A women's crew first appeared in 1977. The women's 1st VIII reached 3rd in the Lent Bumps by 1981 and the 1st women's IV reached 6th in the May Bumps in 1979. Since then, the most successful season was May Bumps 2016, when their men's 1st VIII achieved super-blades and went up 6 places.

In the late 1990s the college digitised and released the Personal History of the Selwyn College Boat Club through its website. Hard copies of the original remain rare, however a signed original version of the monograph remains in the Selwyn College archives.

== Boathouse ==
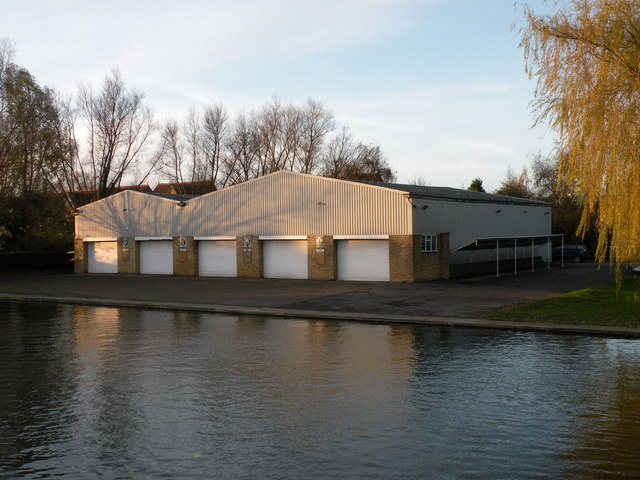
Selwyn College Old Boathouse

The Boat Club moved into its first boathouse during Michaelmas 1883. The boathouse was originally rented from the town-rowing club and later purchased.

Despite these early successes, the fellows of the college decided that the Boat Club should move to a new facility. In the 1960s one of the college's benefactors donated funds that allowed Selwyn College to join with King's College, and Churchill College to build a combined boathouse. In 1968, the combined boathouse opened on the River Cam. The boathouse contained boat bays for each respective college.

In 2014, Selwyn College, King's College and Churchill College announced plans for a new combined boathouse located on the River Cam, near to the majority of the colleges. The new boathouse features double-length beams and extensive gym and training facilities. The combined boathouse was designed by RHP Architects at a cost of approximately £2.20 million and was the winner of the 2017 RIBA East Award for outstanding architecture. This facility was officially completed in 2015-16.

== Honours ==
=== Henley Royal Regatta ===
Year	Races won
1926	Thames Challenge Cup

=== Boat Race representatives ===
The following rowers were part of the rowing club at the time of their participation in The Boat Race.

Men's boat club

Year	Name
1928	N. M. Aldous
1829	A. L. Sulley (cox)
1929	A. L. Sulley (cox)
1930	A. S. Reeve
1934	Ran Laurie
1935	Ran Laurie
1936	Ran Laurie
1938	A. Campbell
1948	M. C. Lapage
1958	J. S. Sulley (cox)
1959	J. S. Sulley (cox)
1960	R. T. Weston (cox)
1961	R. T. Weston (cox)

Year	Name
1966	L. M. Henderson
1967	L. M. Henderson
1967	C. D. C. Challis
1971	B. A. Sullivan
1976	M. P. Wells
1980	Hugh Laurie
1980	J. W. Woodhouse
1989	Paddy M. Mant
1990	Duncan E Hole
1990	Paddy M. Mant
2016	Felix Newman

Women's boat race

Year	Name
2015	Hannah Evans

== Gallery ==
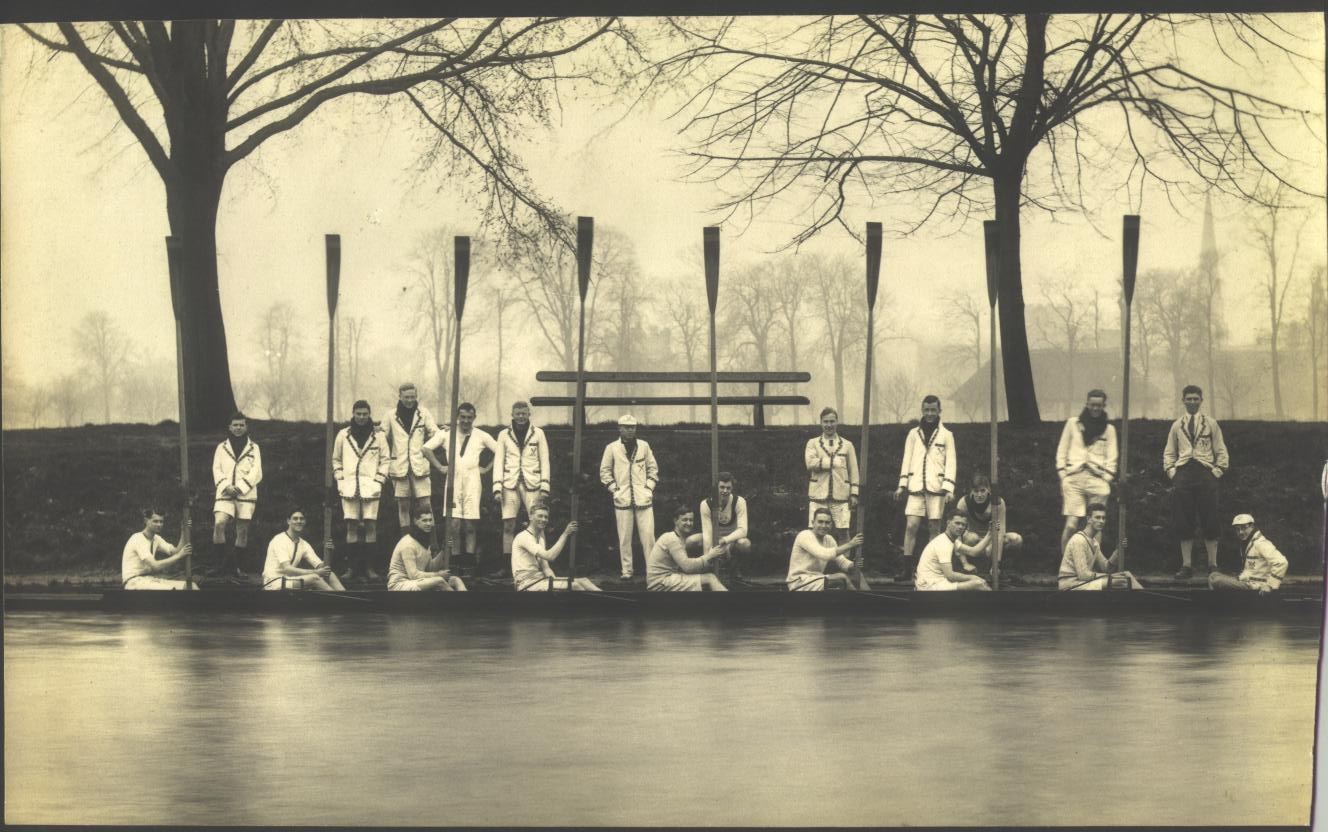
Selwyn College Rowers in 1926

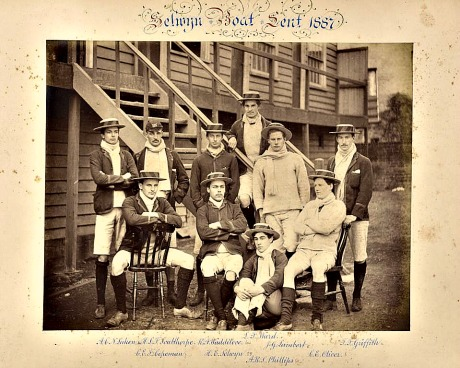
Selwyn College Boat Club (1887)

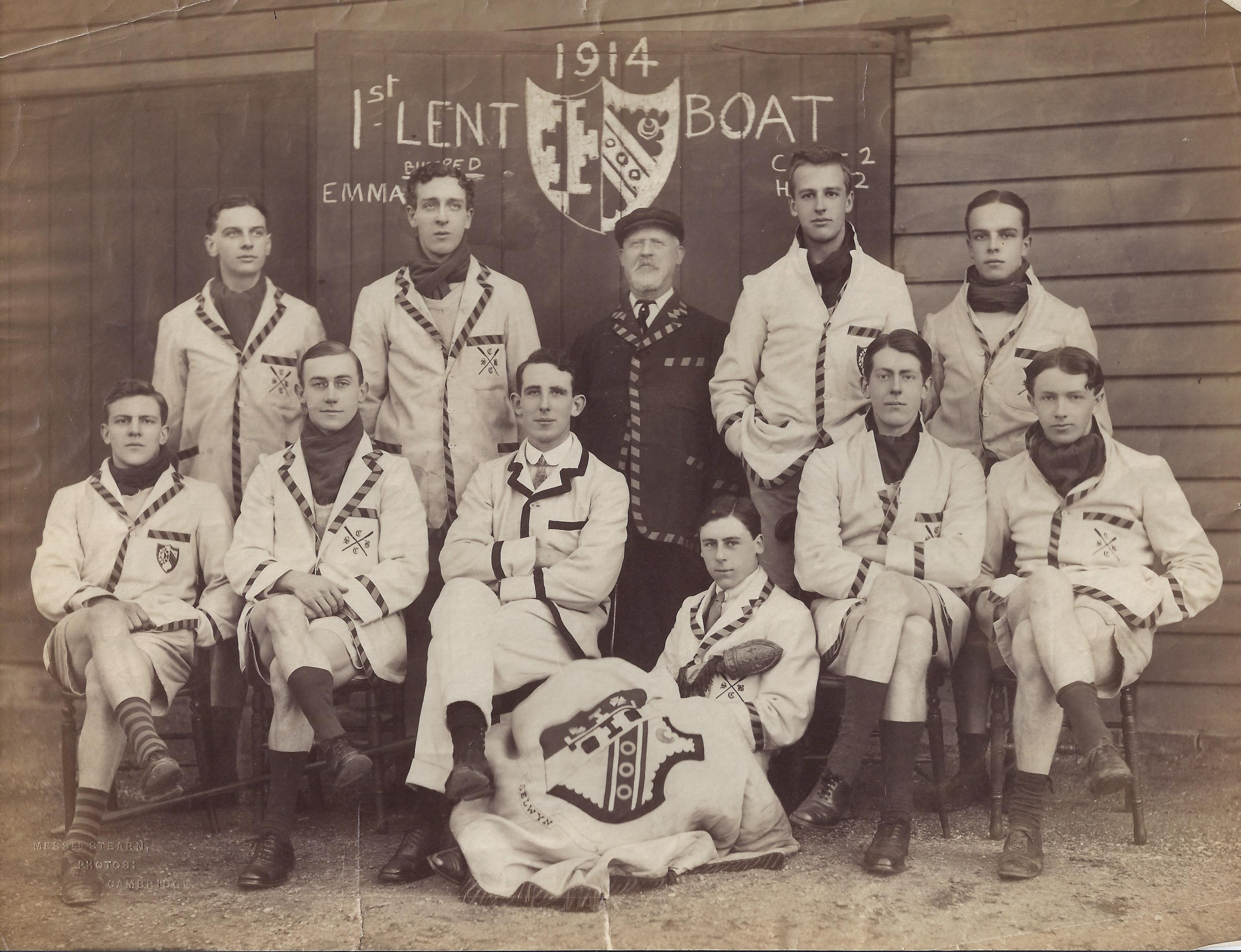
Selwyn College Boat Club (1914)

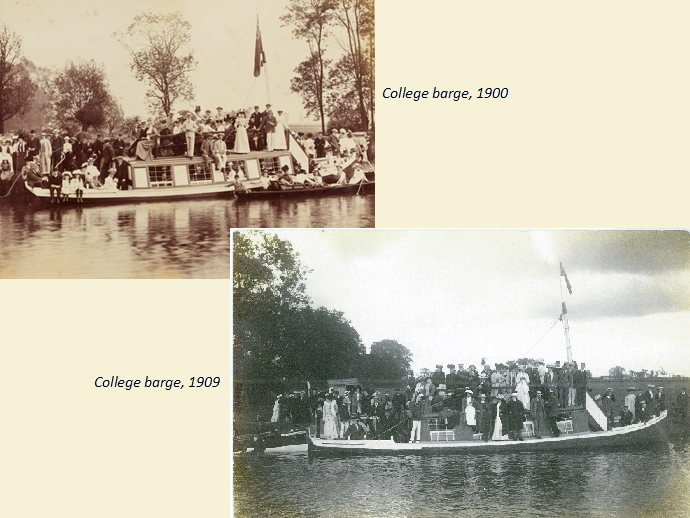
Selwyn College Rowing Barges (River Cam)

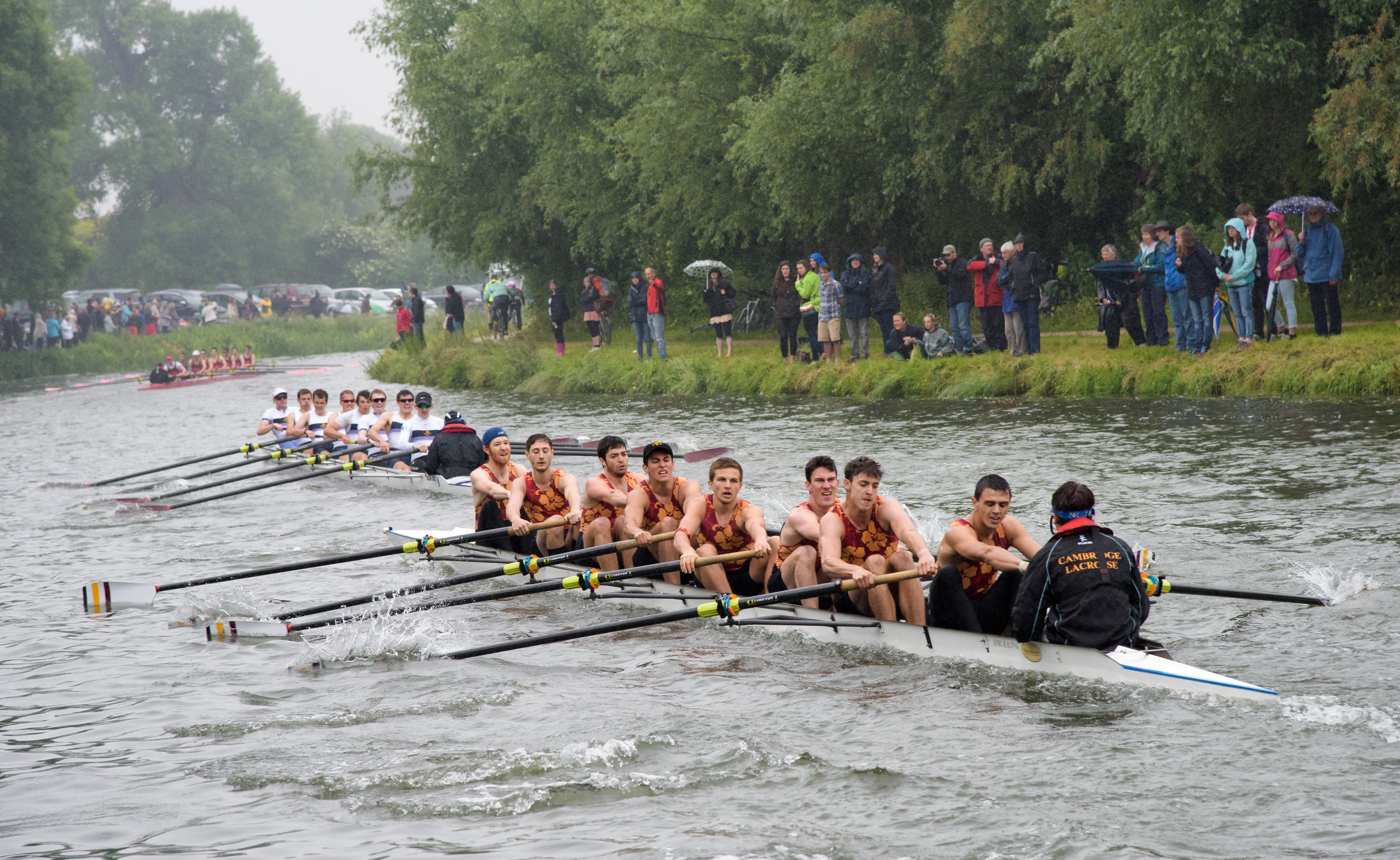
Selwyn College Boat Club (SCBC)

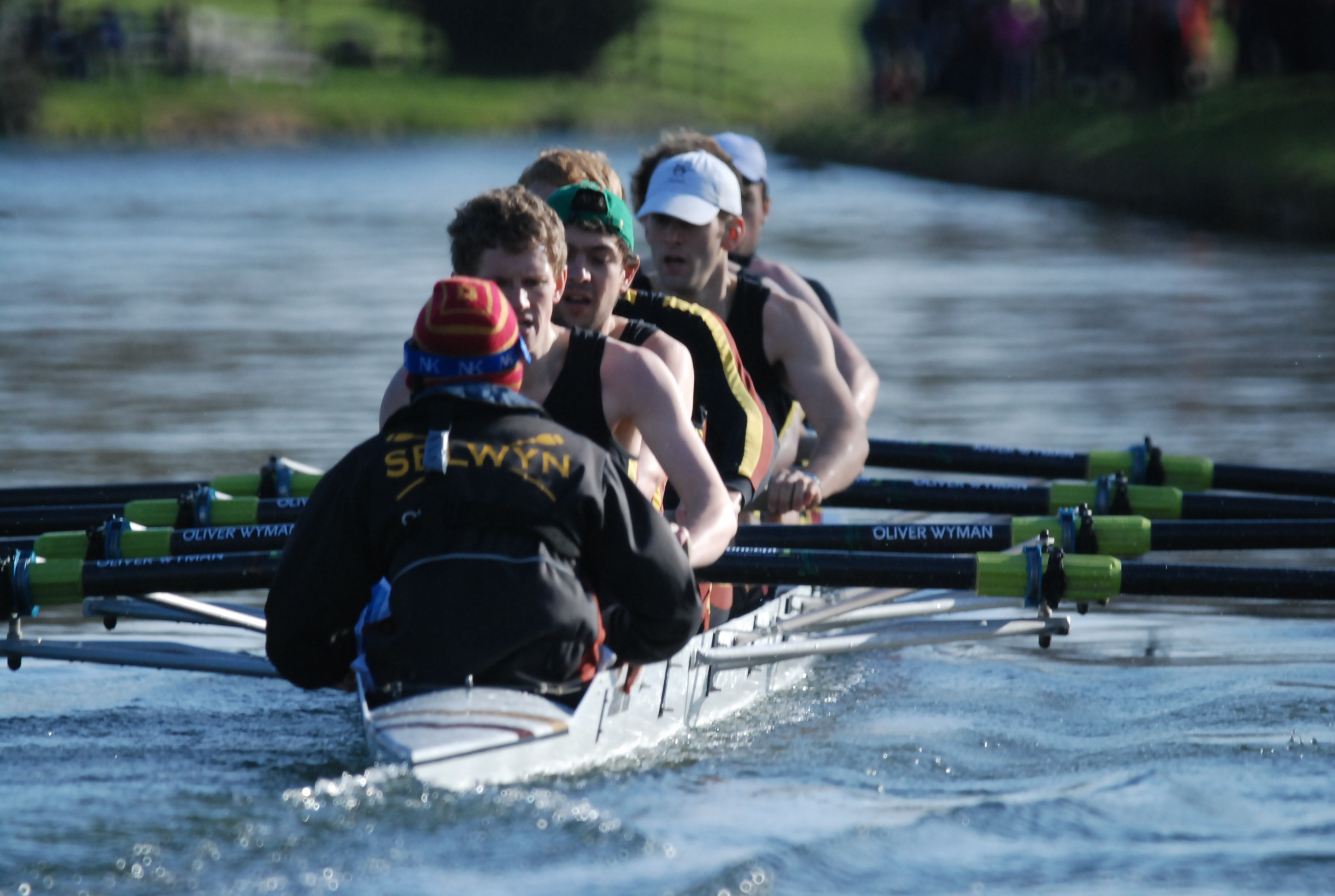
Selwyn College's Men's 8 (2012)
