= Emmanuel Boat Club =

British rowing club

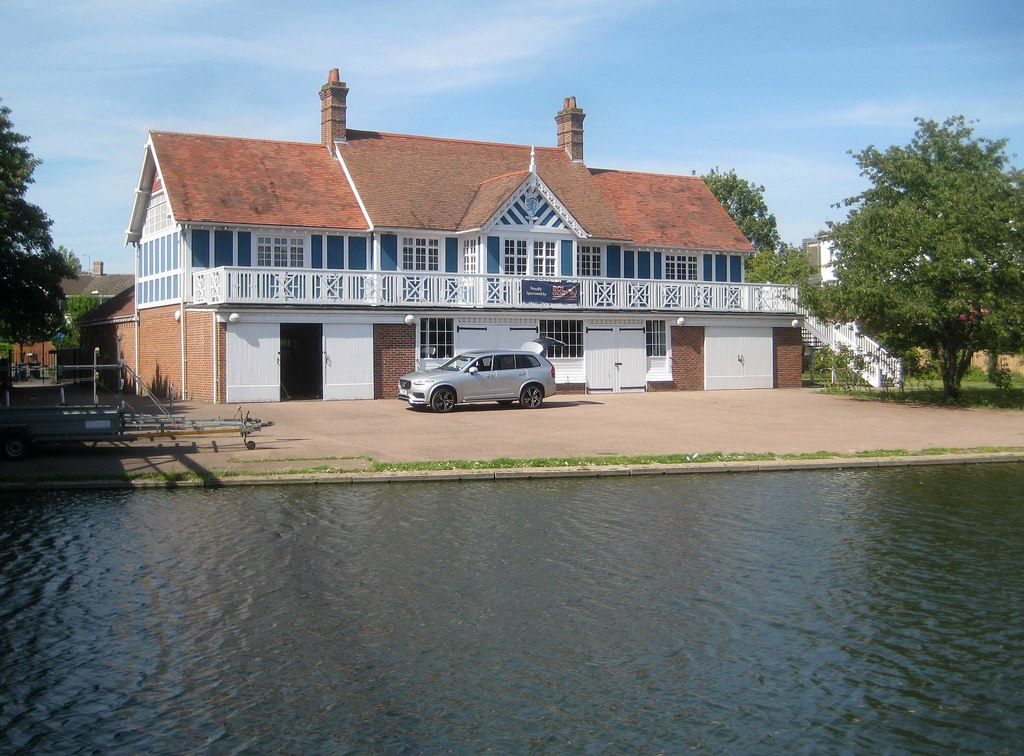

- Motto: Fit Via Vi
- Location: Cambridge, England
- Coordinates: 52°12′38.6″N 0°8′4.3″E
- Home water: River Cam
- Founded: 1827
- Membership: Emmanuel College, Cambridge
- Affiliations: British Rowing, CUCBC
- Website: ebc.soc.srcf.net
- Acronym: EBC

Emmanuel Boat Club (often colloquially referred to as Emma or EBC) is the rowing club for members of Emmanuel College, Cambridge. The men's 1st VIII has stayed largely in the first division of the Lent and May Bumps for the last half-century, but fell as low as 21st in the May Bumps in the 1930s, and has been as low as 28th in the Lent Bumps towards the end of the 19th century.

== History ==
In the Lent Bumps, Emmanuel men gained the headship in 1930, and although they reached 1st position in Lent Bumps 2001, they were not awarded the headship, since the last two days of the races were not completed due to an outbreak of foot and mouth disease in the United Kingdom. Emmanuel did gain the headship at the May Bumps 2001, bumping Caius on the second day.

The women's side achieved the headship of the Lent Bumps eleven times (the first in 1988 and latest in 2009); more than any other women's boatclub, and the headship of the May Bumps four times (the first in 1995). Emmanuel's 1st women's VIII did not drop out of the top 3 crews at Lent Bumps between 1988 and 2005, nor the top 2 places in the May Bumps between 1994 and 2004.

In 2018 Emmanuel's first women and men will start second and seventh on the river respectively, as a result of both crews earning their blades in 2017. It was the second time in the club's history that the first men and women both earned blades in the same year. As of 2024, the first women were 4th on the river and the first men 6th.

== Honours ==
=== Henley Royal Regatta ===
Year	Races won
1887	Diamond Challenge Sculls
1896	Thames Challenge Cup

=== Boat Race representatives ===
The following rowers were part of the rowing club at the time of their participation in The Boat Race.

Men's boat race

Year	Name
1854	Spencer Nairne
1857	A. Benn
1863	R. H. Morgan
1868	J. G. Wood
1869	J. A. Rushton
1879	T. Routledge
1888	J. C. Gardner
1889	J. C. Gardner
1890	J. C. Gardner
1895	T. J. G. Duncanson
1896	T. J. G. Duncanson
1898	W. B. Rennie
1898	S. V. Pearson
1901	E. F. Duncanson
1953	D. A. T. Leadley
1953	L. B. McCagg
1957	R. C. Milton
1958	J. R. Giles
1959	J. R. Giles

Year	Name
1974	D. B. Sprague
1981	R. J. Stephens
1982	R. J. Stephens
1982	I Bernstein (cox)
1983	I Bernstein (cox)
1989	Leigh Weiss
1995	Simon Newton
1996	Nick Burfitt
1998	Jonathan Bull
2000	John O'Loghlen
2007	Jacob Cornelius
2007	Rebecca Dowbiggin (cox)
2008	Rebecca Dowbiggin (cox)
2009	Rebecca Dowbiggin (cox)
2017	Freddie Davidson
2018	Freddie Davidson
2019	Freddie Davidson
2025	Luke Beever

Women's boat race

Year	Name
2019	Larkin Sayre
2021	Abba Parker
2023	Carina Graf
2024	Carina Graf
2026	Matt Moran (cox)
