= Magdalene Boat Club =

British university rowing club

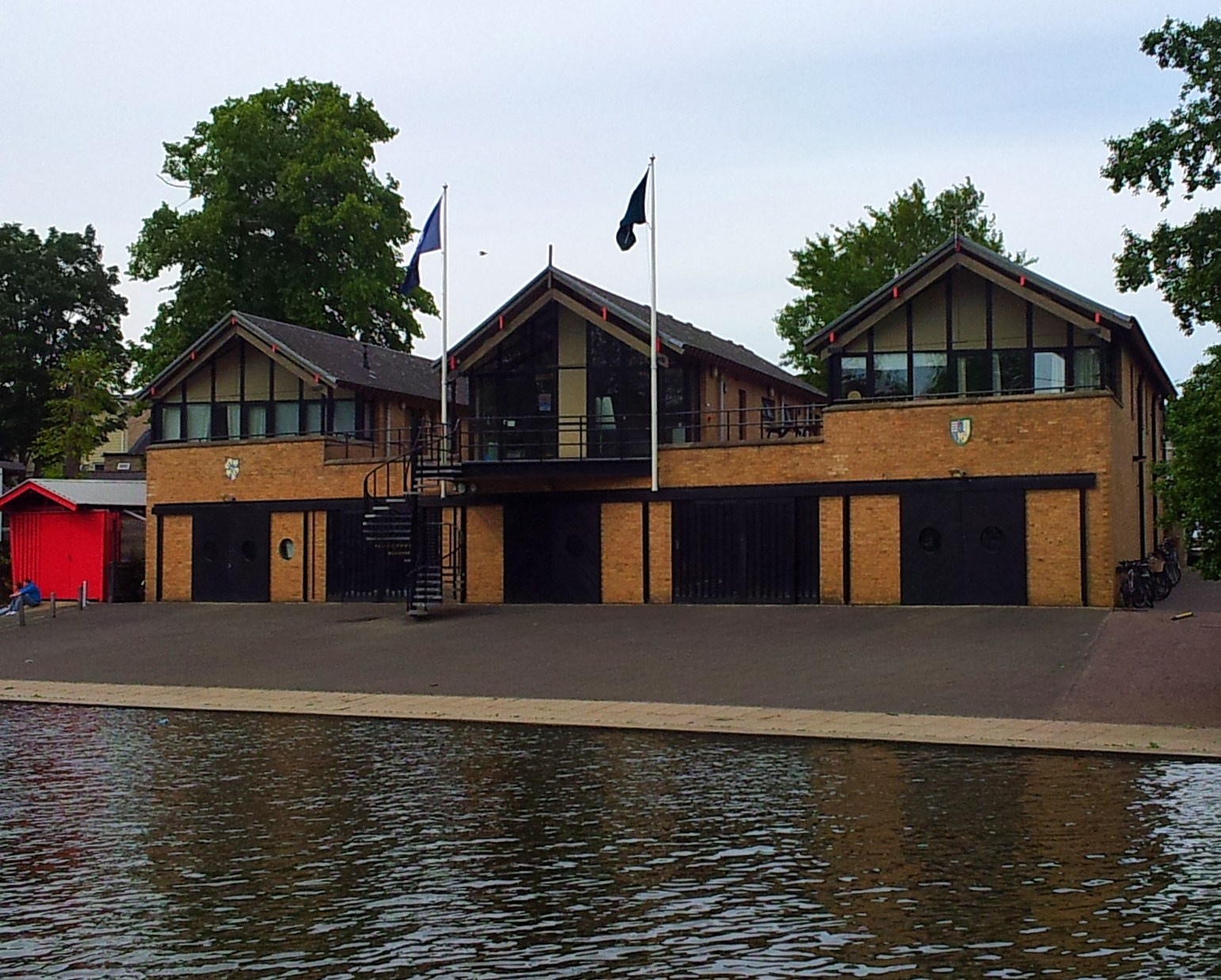

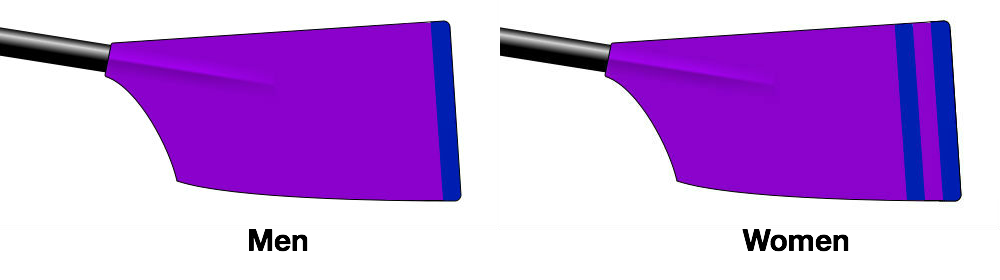
- Motto: Garde ta Foy (Old French)
- Location: Cambridge, England
- Coordinates: 52°12′48.13″N 0°7′36.03″E
- Home water: River Cam
- Founded: 1828
- Membership: Magdalene College
- Affiliations: British Rowing CUCBC
- Website: magdaleneboatclub.co.uk

Notable members
- George Mallory, Joe Garner (businessman)

Magdalene Boat Club /ˈmɔːdlɪn/ (MBC) is the rowing club for members of Magdalene College, Cambridge. The foundation of the MBC in 1828 coincided with the 400th anniversary of the Monk's Hostel or Buckingham College - the original foundation of Magdalene.

== History ==
Magdalene is one of the smaller Cambridge University colleges, but has often put out strong crews. In the early history of the Lent and May Bumps, Magdalene 1st men's VIII were often found in the 2nd division, occasionally slipping into the 3rd. Since about the 1950s, the 1st VIII has largely been in the 1st division or top few crews of the 2nd division. The Magdalene men have never held a headship of either set of races, having reached a highest position of 2nd in the Lent Bumps in 2024 and 2nd in the May Bumps in 2019. Between 2014 and 2019, the men's May Bumps crew enjoyed its most successful period in the Club's history, having risen from the 2nd Division in 2014 up to 2nd on the river in 2019, its highest position ever. In 2018, Magdalene's 4th men's VIII became the first men's crew to record a quadruple-overbump—moving up nine places in one race—at May Bumps (Peterhouse women's first VIII recorded the same feat in 1986). On the first day of the May Bumps in 2019, the 1st men's VIII overbumped from 5th to 2nd on the river, which is the highest overbump in the history of Bumps in Cambridge.

== Recent times ==
Magdalene was the last Oxbridge college to admit women, and a women's crew first appeared in 1989. The women's 1st VIII in the Lent Bumps has spent most of its time in the 2nd division, climbing into the 1st for only 3 days in 1994 and not returning to the 1st division until 2010. In 2008 the women's 1st VIII achieved blades in both the Lent and May Bumps, and it won blades in three consecutive Lents from 2008 to 2010. Magdalene is unique among Cambridge college boat clubs in that the men and women row with slightly different patterns on their blades: the men's blades are lavender with an indigo stripe while the women's blades display two indigo stripes. The cheer of the boat club is 'huzzah', which differs from the customary 'hurrah' cheer used by other Cambridge college boat clubs during races.

The Magdalene Boat Club occasionally sends crews to Henley Royal Regatta with some success. In 1956, Magdalene crews came second in both the Ladies' Challenge Plate and the Visitors' Challenge Cup. Eleven years later, in 1967, the Magdalene won the Visitors' Challenge Cup.

In 2021, a Magdalene and Sidney Sussex college composite crew made the Friday (quarter finals) of the Temple Challenge Cup at Henley Royal Regatta, becoming the first college crew to do so since Lady Margaret Boat Club in 2000. While there was comparatively limited competition due to the outbreak of Covid-19 pandemic, the crew enjoyed a successful season, culminating in winning the final of the June Eights Regatta against Caius in June 2021. Upon the return of May Bumps in 2022 after a three-year hiatus, the crew were bumped by Lady Margaret on the first night, but managed to hold off a charging Pembroke crew, finishing third place on the river.

In 2019, MBC signed a five-year sponsorship agreement with drug discovery company RxCelerate, headquartered at the Babraham Research Campus south of Cambridge.

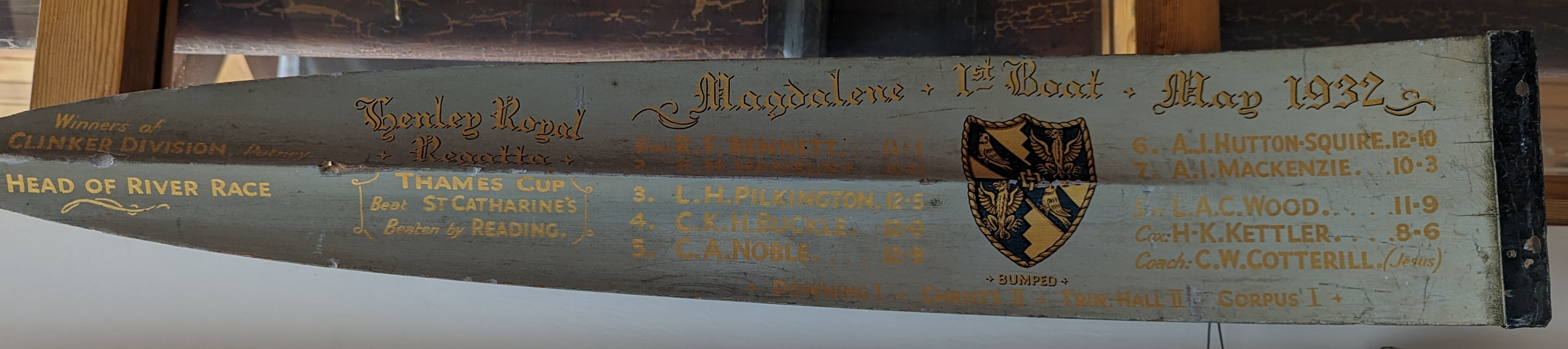
Magdalene blade from 1932

== The Mallory Club ==
The Mallory Club is the boat club for alumni of Magdalene Boat Club. It takes its name from Magdalene alumnus and British mountaineer George Mallory, who was Captain of Boats (1907–08) when MBC was widely recognised as the fastest boat on the River Cam.

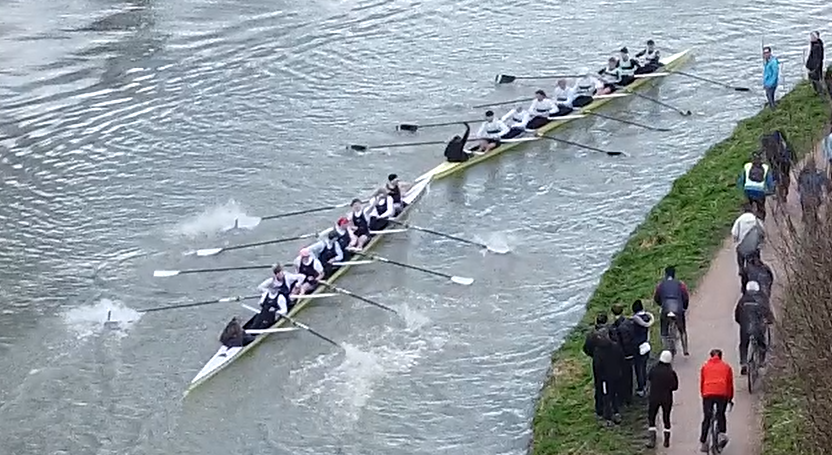
Magdalene bumping Caius to go second; Lents 2024

== Honours ==
=== Boat Race representatives ===
The following rowers were part of the rowing club at the time of their participation in The Boat Race.

Men's boat race

Year	Name
1840	George Charles Uppleby
1840	Francis Penrose
1840	Heighway C. Jones
1841	L. Denman
1841	Francis Penrose
1842	L. Denman
1842	Francis Penrose
1846	Edmond Wilder
1857	R. L. Lloyd
1857	R. Wharton (cox)
1858	R. L. Lloyd
1858	J. Hall
1858	R. Wharton (cox)
1859	R. L. Lloyd
1859	J. Hall
1860	J. Hall
1861	J. Hall
1866	J. Fortescue
1878	J. A. Watson-Taylor
1881	J. A. Watson-Taylor
1934	C. K. Buckle
1937	D. M. W. Napier
1939	H. T. Smith

Year	Name
1947	G. C. Richardson
1948	G. C. Richardson
1957	C. J. Pumphrey
1958	A. T. Denby
1985	A. L. Pasternak
1985	Paddy M. Broughton
1986	Paddy M. Broughton
1987	Paddy M. Broughton
1988	M. J. K. Smith
1989	M. J. K. Smith
1989	Toby Backhouse
1991	Keiron St. C. Allen
1991	Andrew J. L. Bracey (cox)
1992	Donald Fawcett
1992	Andrew Probert
1993	Martin Haycock
1994	Peter J. M. Hoeltzenbein
1994	Martin Haycock
1996	Sebastian J Dawson-Bowling
1999	Tim Wooge
2004	Henry Morris
2014	Helge Gruetjen
2018	Patrick Elwood

Women's boat race

Year	Name
2016	Daphne Martschenko
2022	Paige Badenhorst
