= Peterhouse Boat Club =

British university rowing club

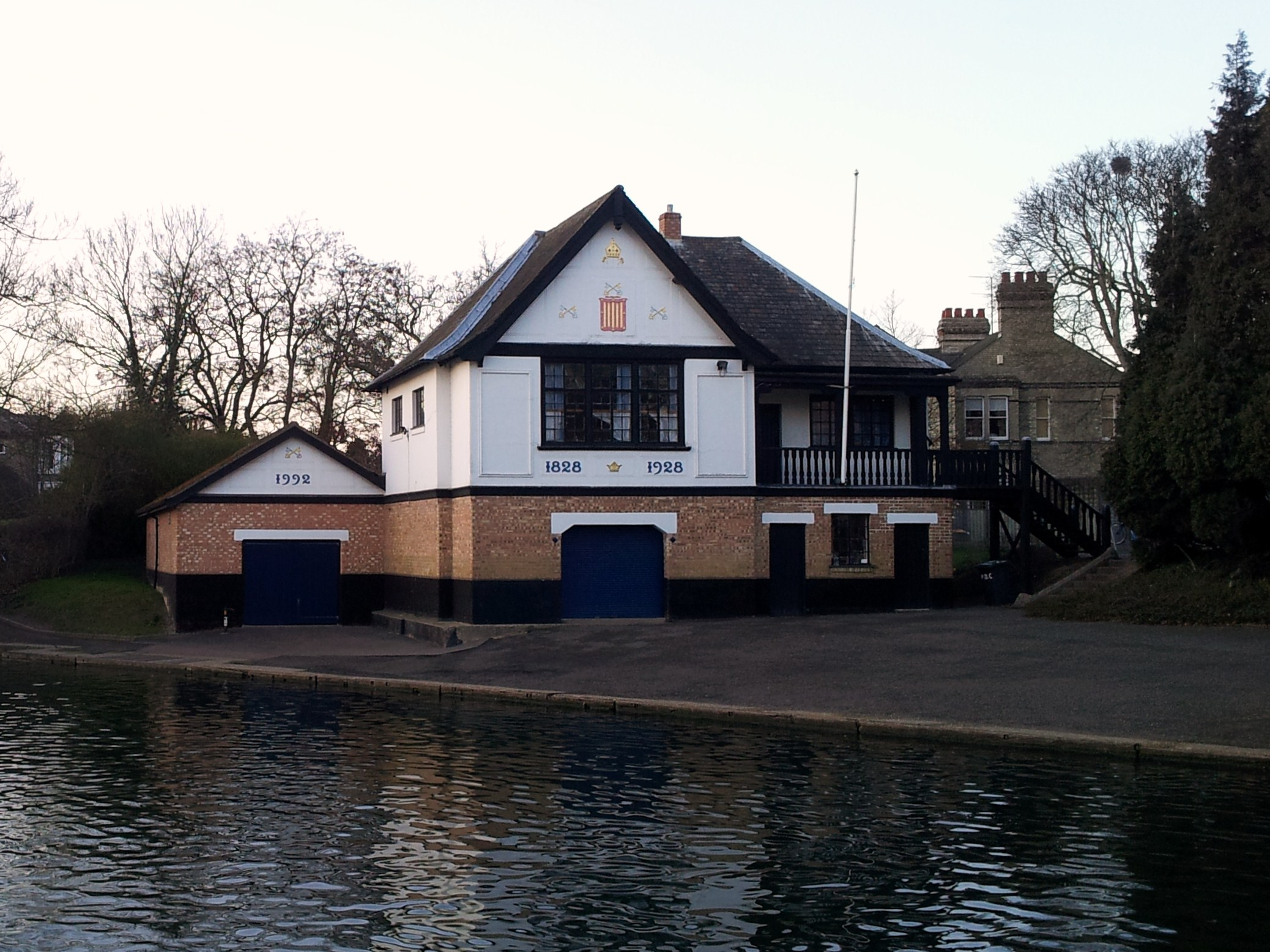

- Location: Cambridge, England
- Coordinates: 52°12′46″N 0°7′42″E
- Home water: River Cam
- Founded: 1828
- Former names: St Peter's College Boat Club
- Affiliations: British Rowing CUCBC
- Website: www.peterhousebc.org

Peterhouse Boat Club is the rowing club for members of Peterhouse, Cambridge. It was founded on 29 April 1828 as St Peter's College Boat Club, but was renamed in 1873 to its present name. The Club's name was officially changed to Peterhouse Boat Club in Michaelmas Term 1872. Alumni of Peterhouse Boat Club are eligible to join the Cross Keys Boat Club.

== History ==
Peterhouse Boat Club was founded on 29 April 1828 as St Peter's College Boat Club, and first raced in Cambridge University Bumps on 2 May 1828. The club went Head of the River the following year, before removing itself from the start order. The club's history became more formal in 1836, as the minute books from that year exist. At this point there were both rowing, and non-rowing members and the club had as much a social purpose as competitive. The club first purchased a boat in 1839, having previously hired craft. Peterhouse Boat Club returned to Head in 1842. While an undergraduate at the college, the later Lord Kelvin rowed for the club for one term at the end of his second year.

The club was one of the first Cambridge colleges to hire a professional coach, paying James Parish of Leander Club £10 in 1846. In 1847, Andrew Fairbairn joined the club, and was later to contribute to its finances. The Club's name was officially changed to Peterhouse Boat Club in Michaelmas Term 1872. In 1925, the club had some coaching from Steve Fairbairn. The following year, the club sent a crew to Henley Royal Regatta for the first time, entering the Thames Challenge Cup.

While Peterhouse is the smallest of all of the colleges of Cambridge University which regularly admit both undergraduates and graduates, its crews have often performed well above its weight, including taking the headship of the May Bumps on 28 February 1842 and that of the Lent Bumps in 1956. In the early days of the Lent and May Bumps, the Peterhouse 1st men's VIII were in the lower half of the 2nd, or even in the 3rd division, but from about 1920 rose to lie in the bottom-half of the 1st division or top-half of the 2nd division. Peterhouse performed well in the Lent Bumps from 1950, not being bumped until 1957, and taking the headship in 1956, a year in which they also won the Ladies' Challenge Plate at Henley Royal Regatta. For the next fifty years, the Peterhouse 1st men's VIII have spent most of their time in the top-half of the 2nd division or bottom-half of the 1st division in both events. Since 2000, however, there has been a steady rise in the 1st men's VIII upwards through the 1st division. In the May Bumps of 2019, the crew was placed 7th.

In 1948, the Irish Olympian Danny Taylor was a coach while he lectured at Peterhouse. Distinguished coaches since then have included the double Olympic gold-medallist James Cracknell, who rowed in the Peterhouse May Bumps VIII of 2019.

A women's crew did not appear until 1986 and has remained in the 2nd division for most of the time since then in both the Lent and May Bumps, although the 1st women's VIII did succeed in breaking into the 1st division in the May Bumps in 2002 for the first time. In 1986, the Peterhouse 1st women's VIII managed the first ever quadruple over-bump in the history of racing in the May Bumps when they caught Clare III to rise 9 positions in a single day.

During World War II, the college hosted members of the London School of Economics, who rowed in the Boat Club's shells during that time.

== Boathouse ==
Peterhouse owns its own boathouse. The current building being the second boathouse to be built on the land. The first dated to 1897 and cost £880, including £280 for the land. It was replaced in 1928 with the current structure at a cost of £4000. It was designed by Montague Wheeler, who was also responsible for the design of the boat house for Trinity Hall Boat Club. The boathouse was extended in 1992 with a new shed to accommodate fours and small boats. Space in the boat house is currently leased to Murray Edwards College.

== Club Colours and Kit ==
The first reference to the club's colour of blue comes in a minute from 21 March 1838, but the colour may have been settled upon earlier.

Peterhouse rows with royal blue blades with two vertical white stripes.

The club has different ties and blazers for its various crews. The tie for the first boat features a royal blue background, with a repeating pattern of three stripes, the middle one thinner than the outer ones. The blazer for first May colours is described as being a "blue blazer edged with 3/4-inch white silk ribbon and mitre and cross keys in silver on pocket". Blazer buttons have had two designs, the earlier one with a design of "St Peter's Boat Club" in a ribbon, around crossed keys, and a second one, used after the club was renamed in 1873 with a design of "Pet. Coll. Cam" below a shield with "BC" and crossed keys.

== Notable members ==
A short list of famous members:

- R H Cobbold member of the Cambridge Blue Boat in the Boat Race 1841 and the Boat Race 1842
- James Mason
- Lord Kelvin
- Matthew Baillie Begbie
- Kevin Whyman, aviator and cox of the Cambridge Blue Boat in the Boat Race 1996

Olympians:

- James Cracknell, Olympic gold medalist for Great Britain in the 2000 and 2004 Summer Olympics
- Thomas George, bronze medallist for Great Britain in the 2020 Summer Olympics
- Oliver Wynne-Griffith, bronze medallist for Great Britain in the 2020 Summer Olympics
- Michael Hart, silver medallist for Great Britain in the 1976 Summer Olympics
- Tom Askwith, British Olympian at the 1932 and 1936 Olympic Games
- Sebastian Thormann, German Olympian in the 2004 Summer Olympics, member of the Cambridge Blue Boat in the Boat Race 2006
- Stefan Forster, German Olympian in the 1996 Summer Olympics
- Natan Węgrzycki-Szymczyk, Polish sculler in the 2016 Summer Olympics
- Danny Taylor, Irish Olympian in the 1948 Summer Olympics

== Honours ==
=== Henley Royal Regatta ===
Year	Races won
1853	Diamond Challenge Sculls
1933	Diamond Challenge Sculls
1956	Ladies' Challenge Plate

=== Boat Race representatives ===
The following rowers were part of the rowing club at the time of their participation in The Boat Race.

Men

Year	Name
1841	R. H. Cobbold
1842	R. H. Cobbold
1899	J. E. Payne
1900	J. E. Payne
1932	Tom Askwith
1933	Tom Askwith
1957	M. H. Bartlett
1972	Michael Hart
1973	Michael Hart
1996	Kevin Whyman (cox)
1997	Brad Crombie
1997	Kevin Whyman (cox)
1998	Brad Crombie
1998	Stefan Forster
1999	Brad Crombie
2000	Ronan P. Cantwell
2001	Tim Wooge
2003	Alexander McGarel-Groves
2003	Tim Wooge
2004	Kenelm Richardson (cox)
2006	Sebastian Thormann
2009	Peter Marsland
2010	Ted Randolph

Year	Name
2013	Milan Bruncvík
2016	Clemens Auersperg
2019	James Cracknell
2019	Samuel Hookway
2019	Natan Węgrzycki-Szymczyk
2021	Ollie Parish
2021	Callum Sullivan
2022	George Finlayson
2022	Thomas George
2022	Oliver Wynne-Griffith
2022	Ollie Parish
2023	Nick Mayhew
2023	Ollie Parish
2025	Simon Hatcher
2025	Gabriel Mahler
2025	George Bourne
2025	James Robson
2025	Luca Ferraro
2026	Simon Hatcher
2026	Patrick Wild
2026	Gabriel Obholzer

Women

Year	Name
2025	Claire Collins
2026	Antonia Galland
2026	Camille Vandermeer
