= St Edmund Hall Boat Club =

British rowing club

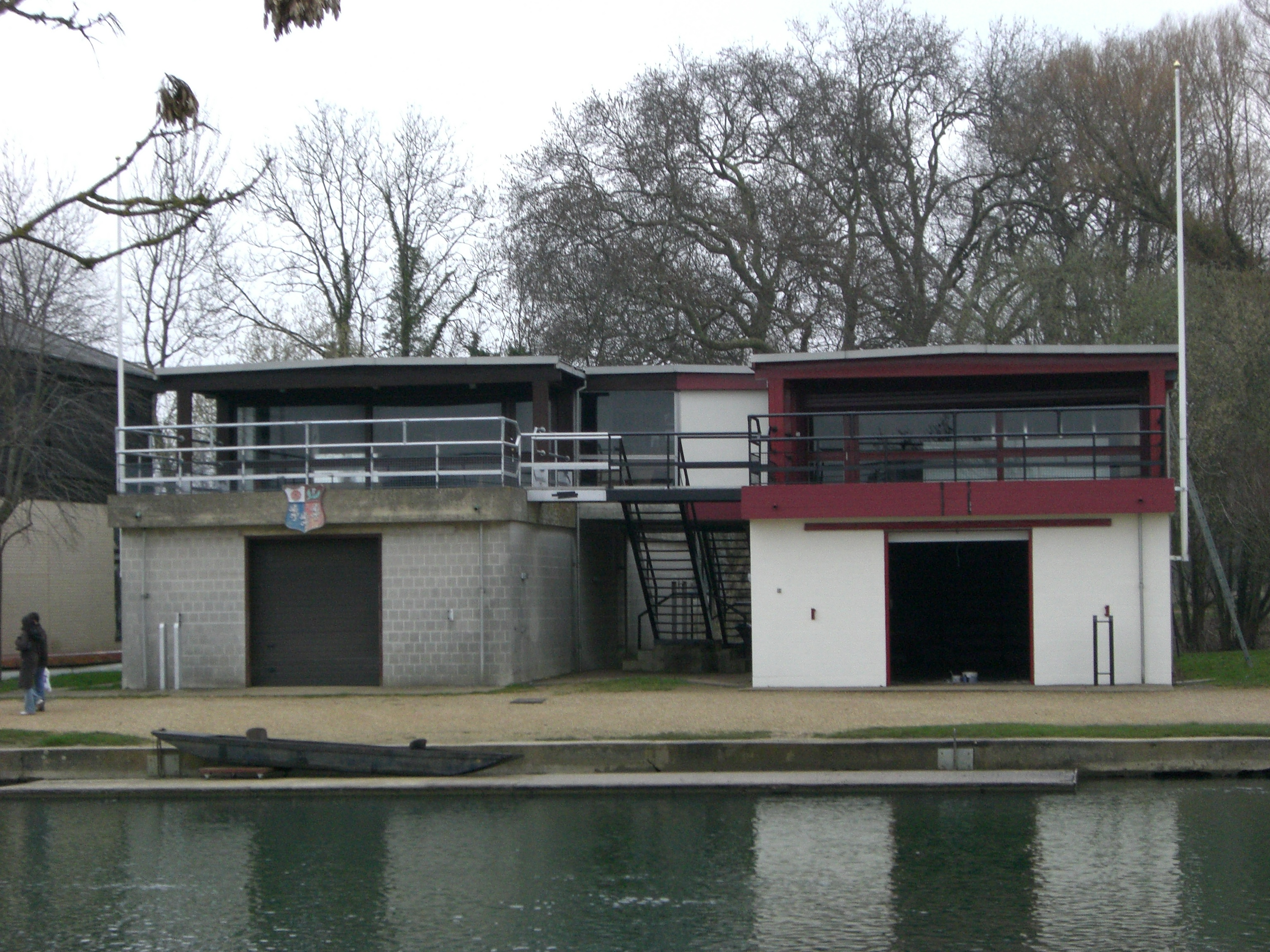

- The club's boathouse (right) and blade colours
- Coordinates: 51.743852°N 1.250479°W
- Home water: Isis
- Founded: c. 1861
- Key people: President: Cerys Acton Vice-President: Sebastian Harker Men's Captains: Alexander Harris Women's Captains: Eleanor Calcutt, Molly Petipher
- Head of the River: Men: 1959, 1960, 1961, 1964, 1965; Women: 2006, 2007, 2008, 2009
- University: University of Oxford
- Colours
- Affiliations: British Rowing (boat code SEH); Fitzwilliam College BC (Sister college)
- Website: www.sehbc.org

St Edmund Hall Boat Club (commonly abbreviated to SEHBC) is a rowing club for members of St Edmund Hall, Oxford in the United Kingdom. It is based in its own boathouse on the Isis.

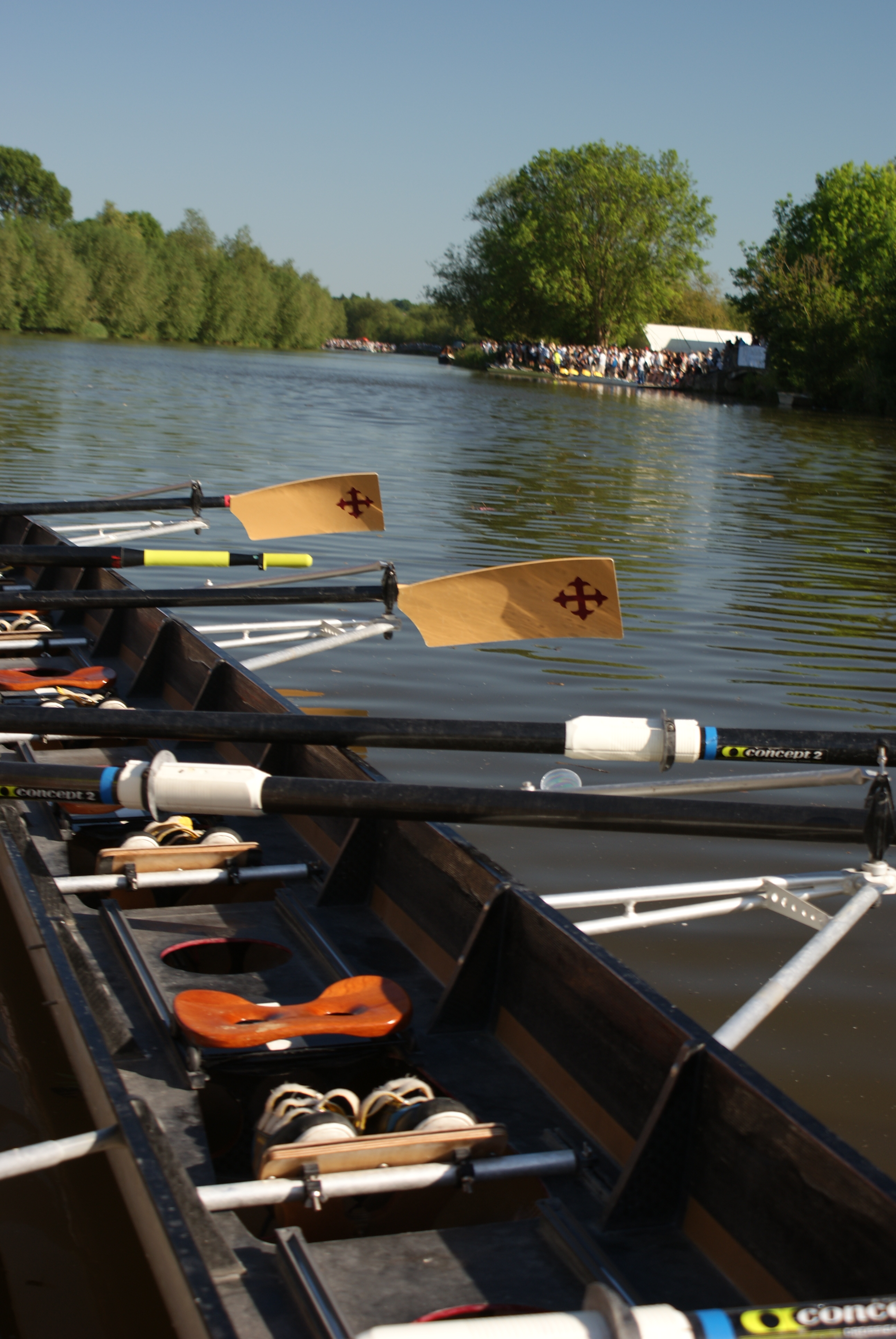
St Edmund Hall 2009 1st VIII boat, before the race on Saturday of Eights.

== Between the wars ==
=== Summer Eights ===
The Summer Eights of 1934 was perhaps the most successful in SEHBC's history until that point and were the first Summer Eights in which SEHBC entered two crews. The 1st VIII first won promotion to the 1st Division, with seven bumps over the six days of racing, and the 2nd VIII started at the bottom of the bottom 5th Division and won promotion to the 4th Division also with seven bumps.

The Times of Thursday 24 May 1934 reported that - "The racing in the Summer Eights was concluded at Oxford yesterday when Oriel retained the Headship of the River. ... St. Edmund Hall continued their victorious career with a bump over St. John's in Iffley Reach and this completed a record in gaining seven bumps in the six days' racing. St. Edmund Hall has been steadily gaining a reputation in other branches of sport although they only number 120, this is the first occasion on which they have ever made their way into the First Division. Not satisfied with this their second crew, which started bottom but one in the Fifth Division, also made seven bumps, which put them well into the Fourth Division. ... This remarkable achievement was equalled also by Queen's II, who, starting fourth in the Fourth Division, finished ninth in the Third."

=== Torpids ===
Torpids were suspended during World War I, resuming in 1920. SEH remained in the 3rd Division for the 1920s, gradually working its way up, finishing head of the 3rd Division in Torpids 1930. Moving into the 2nd Division for the first time in 1931, the SEH VIII got six bumps in the then six day Torpids format. The rowing correspondent of The Times commented on the success of SEH "who are now taking a prominent place in every branch of sport at Oxford."

Torpids 1933 saw the best SEH performance in Torpids to date, with the VIII getting six bumps and winning promotion for the first time to the 1st Division. The Times noted that "St. Edmund Hall eclipsed all their previous performances on the river by making no fewer than four bumps in the First Division, with a record of six altogether."

SEHBC put out a 2nd VIII for the first time in Torpids 1935, being entered in the new 4th Division, and making six bumps and winning promotion to the 3rd Division. The 1st VIII got four bumps in the 1st Division, and finished third on the river, its highest ever place. The 2nd VIII made four bumps in 1936, with the 1st VIII dropping to fifth on the river. British Pathe footage exists of the 1936 Torpids (crews unknown) from 'News in a Nutshell' (from about 30–60 sec in).

The 1st VIII regained its third position in Torpids 1937, and after being bumped on the first day, the 2nd VIII made four bumps. After an intense series of races in Torpids 1938, with the Times correspondent expecting SEH to secure the headship for the first time in their career, the 1st VIII finished second on the river after New College. The tables were turned in the 1939 Torpids. The Times records a series of close races in the 1st Division, with New College winning by only a few feet, until the 1st VIII got its bump, finishing Head of the River for the first time. The Times commented that "it was a red letter day for St. Edmund Hall, one of the smallest of Oxford colleges, who realized their ambition by wresting the Headship of the River from New College. St. Edmund Hall have always maintained their rowing traditions, notwithstanding the difficulties they have experienced in manning an eight, which on one occasion forced them to transfer their coxswain to the bow thwart." The 2nd VIII bumped its way to the head of the 3rd Division, making Torpids 1939 SEHBC's most successful rowing campaign to date.

SEH 1st VIII Torpids 1939, Head of the River

== Post-World War II ==
Notably, the 3rd VIII achieved six bumps on the then six days in 1952, and repeated that achievement in both 1953 and in 1954 (although 1954 saw the introduction of the four race Summer Eights format, with the SEH 3rd VIII bumping on all four days).

=== Summer Eights ===
- Reporting on the 1959 Summer Eights, The Times commented that "The main interest in the eights, however, centres on whether St. Edmund Hall will catch Christ Church. St. Edmund Hall have done all their training at Henley, so they have not been seen alongside their opponents. But they are certainly above the standard of recent Oxford eights. It is possible, on the eve of the races, to see them as potentially the fastest crew on the Isis", and "it was also fitting that 1959 should herald a new crew at the head of the river, from a college which has never before held that honour. St. Edmund Hall have worked hard, and thoroughly deserved their success. Their pace was obvious, but some questioned their staying powers. Probably those underestimated the ability of C. W. Holden, who was able to spurt again and again, although backed by a fit and strong crew, he rowed Christ Church down just above the pink post. The Times also noted that "St. Edmund Hall II made five [bumps], to finish in the second division, the highest second boat on the river, a clear indication that their first boat's success was no flash in the pan.
- At the end of the 1960 Summer Eights, The Times concluded that "As expected, St. Edmund Hall had no difficulty in retaining their position at the head of the river in the Summer Eights, which finished at Oxford on Saturday. Even without their three Blues they were able to boat two senior and three junior trial caps, or four of the crew who went head last year. It is impossible to say how fast they were, since they were never extended. They will need a stronger finish if they are to do themselves justice at Henley, but their performance was impressive nevertheless." As it turned out, The Times rowing correspondent was right, as the joint SEH/Lincoln College VIII were the losing finalists in the 1960 Stewards' Challenge Cup.
- Having successfully retained its headship in 1961, The Times said of the 1st VIII "It is rare indeed for an Oxford college to be in the fortunate position of having to make only one change in the composition of a crew which rowed head of the river in the preceding year, and that the inclusion of a Blue in place of a mere trial cap. In these circumstances it was to be expected that St. Edmund Hall would stay head without difficulty, and it may be said that they fully lived up to expectations. Rough, and perhaps short at the finish, they nevertheless had real pace, and it is heartening that they can take their crew complete to Henley." The SEHBC coxless IV went on to win the Visitors' Challenge Cup.
- In 1964 the battle for the headship lay between SEH and Keble, with SEH regaining its headship with two bumps. The Times' analysis was that "Of the 16 men who rowed in the Oxford senior trials last November, five came from Keble and five from St. Edmund Hall. Another three men from each of these colleges rowed in the junior trials, and, in addition, Keble had three Blues and St. Edmund Hall one. So it can well be understood that the remaining six senior and 10 junior trial caps, spread among 21 other colleges, are pretty thin on the ground … St. Edmund Hall are by far the most talented crew at Oxford, and, indeed, the only crew which has no weak links. They have been training at Henley, and so have not been seen in proximity with Keble. They must be favourites to finish head this week, but it may not be an easy passage."
- The Times' final analysis of the 1964 Summer Eights was that "For once, there was no doubt that the first three crews finished in order of merit … But undoubtedly it was St. Edmund Hall's week. Their second crew made four bumps, their third and fourth crews made three, having been robbed on Thursday night. Their sixth crew held its place, and their seventh crew gained one place. No other college had more than five crews on the river. The strength of the head of the river crew lay in fitness and uniformity of quality. It is doubtful whether they were exceptionally fast, but they were the sort of crew which would probably show to greater advantage over the Henley course. And it seems that they will leave us with an example which others might well take to heart, for they are now placing University before College, and putting all these men at the disposal of the president, who hopes to form a representative Isis crew for Henley."
- 1965 was perhaps the golden year of SEH rowing. The Times' rowing correspondent wrote before Summer Eights that "With five winning Blues, three winning Isis men, three Isis spares, and two junior trial caps, it is not surprising that St. Edmund Hall have two of the strongest college crews seen at Oxford for many a year. The first crew start head of the river in the Summer Eights tonight, and nothing short of a catastrophe or a miracle is likely to displace them. Their second start 18th and could probably catch a dozen crews ahead of them. But their progress must depend, of course, on the luck of the racing." At the end of Eights, The Times commented that "Unfortunately there was no crew in the Summer Eights at Oxford capable of extending St. Edmund Hall, and they passed the O.U.B.C. at 35 on Saturday with at least four lengths of clear water behind them. They were smooth, strong, and competent, and my hope is that Henley will prove them also to be fast." Later at Henley that summer, his hope transpired, with the 1st VIII duly winning The Ladies' Challenge Plate and an SEHBC coxless IV winning the Visitors' Challenge Cup.
- However, Summer Eights 1965 was not solely about the success of the 1st VIII. The Boat Club accomplished the notable achievement of finishing with both its 2nd VIII and its 1st VIII in the 1st Division. All the other boats performed strongly. The Times' rowing correspondent noted that "By catching Magdalen at the top of the second division and then bumping Exeter when they raced as sandwich boat, St. Edmund Hall's second boat safely established themselves in the first division. It has been a triumphant week for the Boat Club, as, apart from the first boat at the Head of the River, the other seven boats have gained 18 places between them", and that "The most spectacular advance of all was by St. Edmund Hall II, who made an overbump on Wednesday and two bumps on Friday, to gain a total of seven places. Their list of victims, Hertford, Brasenose, Trinity, Corpus, Magdalen, Exeter, and New College — all, of course, first Eights — reads like a Roll of Honour of the Head of the River crews of the past 100 years."

=== Henley Royal Regatta ===
SEH also enjoyed success at the Henley Royal Regatta.

- In 1958 an SEH coxless IV were the losing finalists in the Ladies' Challenge Plate, losing to Keble by 3 lengths.
- In 1959 a joint SEH/Lincoln College VIII won the Stewards' Challenge Cup, beating GS Moto Guzzi of Italy easily.
- In 1960 another joint SEH/Lincoln College VIII were the losing finalists in the Stewards' Challenge Cup, being beaten by Barn Cottage BC by 4 lengths.
- In 1961 an SEH coxless IV won the Visitors' Challenge Cup, beating St Catharine's College, Cambridge by 1½ lengths.
- In 1963 the 1st VIII were the losing finalists in the Ladies' Challenge Plate, losing to the Royal Military Academy Sandhurst by ½ length.
- In 1965, SEHBC had two victories; the 1st VIII won the Ladies' Challenge Plate, beating Jesus College, Cambridge by ¾ length, and an SEHBC coxless IV won the Visitors' Challenge Cup, beating Fitzwilliam House, Cambridge by 2 lengths.

== SEHBC at the Olympics ==
A number of SEHBC rowers have represented their countries at the Olympic Games. These include:

- Tokyo 1960: Richard Fishlock, GB men's VIII
- Tokyo 1960: Richard Bate, GB men's VIII
- Beijing 2008: Scott Frandsen, Canadian coxless pair
- Beijing 2008, Alice Freeman, GB women's VIII
- London 2012, Scott Frandsen, Canadian coxless pair

Additionally, Stewart Douglas-Mann represented the club and the England team at the 1958 British Empire and Commonwealth Games in Cardiff, Wales.

== Recent Successes ==
The men have had notable success in Torpids over the years. Each of the Men's 1st VIII, 2nd VIII, and 3rd VIII has won blades five times or more (the 3rd VIII most recently in 1983, the 2nd VIII most recently in 2016, and the 1st VIII seven times, most recently in 2019). Both the 1st and 2nd Torpids VIIIs were awarded blades in 2009. SEHBC has achieved this feat at least once before in the 1930s. The Men's 2nd VIII went on to be awarded blades in Summer Eights of the same year. The Men's 1st VIII most recently achieved the impressive feat of Division 1 blades in both Torpids and Summer Eights in 2019.

In Summer VIIIs of 2025, the Men's 3rd VIII won blades and matched the all time record of gaining +11 positions in one Eights Week. In 2026, the Women's 2nd VIII achieved Blades.

== Boat Race representatives ==
The following rowers were part of the rowing club at the time of their participation in The Boat Race.

Men's boat race

Year	Name
1937	J. P. Burrough
1937	G. J. P. Merrifield (cox)
1938	J. P. Burrough
1938	G. J. P. Merrifield (cox)
1939	A. G. Slemeck
1947	P. H. Mathews
1956	B. E. B. K. Venner (cox)
1958	J. H. Ducker
1958	J. L. Fage
1959	S. C. H. Douglas-Mann
1959	J. L. Fage
1960	R. C. I. Bate
1960	R. L. S. Fishlock
1960	P. J. Reynolds (cox)
1961	R. C. I. Bate
1961	J. C. D. Sherratt
1961	P. J. Reynolds
1962	J. C. D. Sherratt
1963	S. R. Morris
1965	S. R. Morris
1965	D. J. Mills

Year	Name
1965	R. D. Clegg
1965	H. W. Howell
1965	E. S. Trippe
1966	R. D. Clegg
1966	M. S. Kennard
1967	J. R. Bockstoce
1967	M. S. Kennard
1968	M. S. Kennard
1968	J. R. Bockstoce
1975	J. N. Calvert (cox)
1976	J. N. Calvert (cox)
1979	R. J. Moore
1980	J. S. Mead (cox)
1997	P. A. Greaney (cox)
1998	P. A. Greaney (cox)
2003	Scott Frandsen
2007	Andrew Wright
2008	Aaron Marcovy
2016	George McKirdy
2018	Iain Mandale

Women's boat race

Year	Name
2017	Alice Roberts
2018	Alice Roberts
2019	Liv Pryer
2026	Esther Briz Zamorano

== See also ==
- University rowing (UK)
- Oxford University Rowing Clubs
- Eights Week
