= Alex Greaney =

British rower

Personal information
- Nationality: British

Sport
- Sport: Rowing
- College team: St Edmund Hall Boat Club
- Club: Oxford University Boat Club

Peter Alexander Greaney is a former University Boat Race cox.

== Profile ==
Whilst in education at Abingdon School he gained colours for the Abingdon School Boat Club and became a Great Britain Junior International in 1993. After leaving Abingdon in 1994 he attended St Edmund Hall, Oxford at the University of Oxford studying Metallurgy and joined the St Edmund Hall Boat Club. He is currently Assistant Professor of Materials Science at the Department of Mechanical, Industrial & Manufacturing Engineering at Oregon State University.

== Rowing ==
In 1997 he was selected as the cox for the Oxford dark blue boat in the Boat Race but finished on the losing side. A second appearance as cox in 1998 ensued but Oxford once again lost.

== See also ==
- List of Old Abingdonians
