= The Boat Race 1997 =

1997 boat race between Oxford and Cambridge

143rd Boat Race
- Date: 29 March 1997
- Winner: Cambridge
- Margin of victory: 2 lengths
- Winning time: 17 minutes 38 seconds
- Overall record (Cambridge–Oxford): 74–68
- Umpire: Tom Cadoux-Hudson (Oxford)

Other races
- Reserve winner: Goldie
- Women's winner: Cambridge

The 143rd Boat Race between crews from the University of Oxford and the University of Cambridge took place on the River Thames on 29 March 1997. Umpired by former Oxford rower Tom Cadoux-Hudson, Cambridge won in a time of 17 minutes and 38 seconds.

In the reserve race, Cambridge's Goldie beat Oxford's Isis by 6 1/2 lengths. Cambridge won the 52nd Women's Boat Race.

== Background ==
The Boat Race is a side-by-side rowing competition between the University of Oxford and the University of Cambridge. First held in 1829, the competition is a 4.2-mile (6.8 km) race along the River Thames in southwest London. The rivalry is a major point of honour between the two universities and followed throughout the United Kingdom and worldwide. Cambridge went into the race as reigning champions, having won the 1996 race by 2 3/4 lengths, and led overall with 73 victories to Oxford's 68 (excluding the "dead heat" of 1877). The race was the last to be sponsored by Beefeater Gin.

The first Women's Boat Race took place in 1927, but did not become an annual fixture until the 1960s. Until 2014, the contest was conducted as part of the Henley Boat Races, but as of the 2015 race, it is held on the River Thames, on the same day as the men's main and reserve races. The reserve race, contested between Oxford's Isis boat and Cambridge's Goldie boat has been held since 1965. It usually takes place on the Tideway, prior to the main Boat Race.

== Crews ==
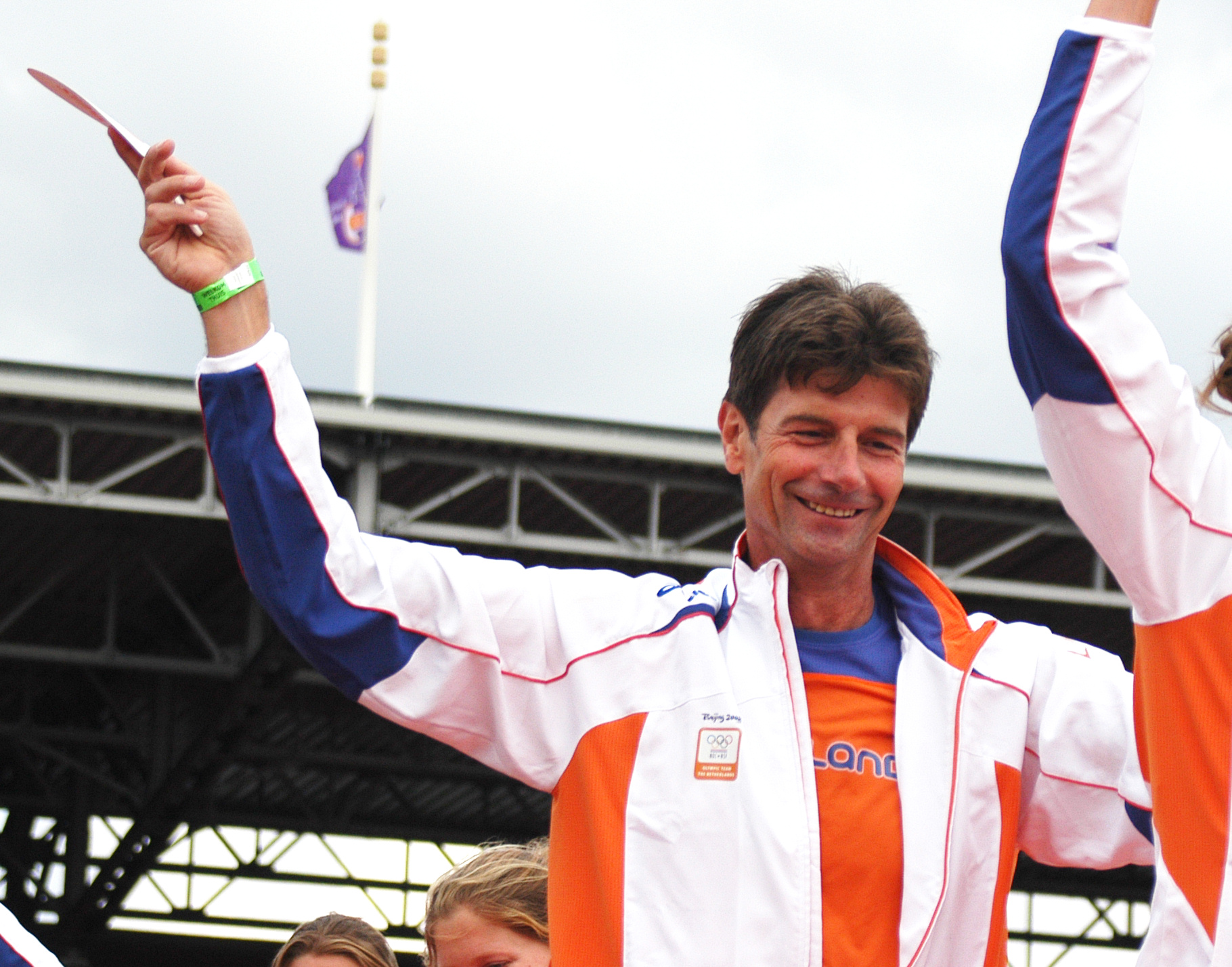
Oxford's Mijnders was the Dutch international coach.

The weigh-in was held at the Hurlingham Club on 24 March 1997. The Cambridge crew, pre-race favourites, weighed an average of 1 pound (0.45 kg) more per rower than Oxford, with Cambridge's Alex Story the heaviest man in the race at 16 stone (100 kg). The crews were the tallest in the history of the race, with Cambridge averaging 6 ft 5.25 in (1.96 m) to Oxford's 6 ft 4.5 in (1.94 m). Oxford's Roberto Blanda became the first Blue from Italy. Cambridge's crew featured three former Blues, while Oxford's crew contained none.

Cambridge were coached once again by Robin Williams, while Oxford were guided by Dutchman René Mijnders, who had led the Netherlands to Olympic gold in Atlanta in the men's eight.

Seat	Oxford			Cambridge		
Seat	Name	College	Weight	Name	College	Weight
Bow	James Roycroft	Keble	13 st 7 lb	David Cassidy	Trinity Hall	13 st 8.5 lb
2	Charlie Humphreys	Oriel	12 st 8 lb	Roger Pim	Downing	13 st 5.5 lb
3	Nick Robinson	Lincoln	13 st 9 lb	Damien Maltarp ‡	Trinity	13 st 6 lb
4	A Lindsay	Brasenose	14 st 2.5 lb	Brad Crombie	Peterhouse	14 st 10.5 lb
5	Roberto Blanda	Brasenose	15 st 6.5 lb	Ethan Ayer ‡	St Edmund's	15 st 6 lb
6	L Grubor	Somerville	15 st 9 lb	Alan Watson	Sidney Sussex	13 st 6 lb
7	Jordan Irving	Keble	13 st 10 lb	A Story ‡	St Edmund's	16 st 0 lb
Stroke	T Foster	St Cross	13 st 11.5 lb	James Ball	Robinson	13 st 2 lb
Cox	P A Greaney	St Edmund Hall	8 st 7.5 lb	Kevin Whyman	Peterhouse	7 st 13 lb
Source: ‡ – Two days prior to the race, Maltarp moved from 7 to 3, Ayer from 3 to 5 and Story from 5 to 7.

== Race description ==
The Championship Course

Oxford's non-rowing boat club president Ed Bellamy won the toss and selected the Surrey station as the starting point for his crew, Cambridge therefore started from the Middlesex station. Immediately from the start, Cambridge cox Kevin Whyman steered into the Oxford water, closing the lateral gap between the boats and securing a series of warnings from race umpire Tom Cadoux-Hudson. Oxford held a lead of a few feet round the Fulham bend, but the crews were level at the mile post. By Hammersmith Bridge, Oxford had pulled away marginally to hold a one-third length lead, but superior steering by Whyman around the Surrey bend pulled Cambridge back into contention, level by the Chiswick Steps, and a length ahead by Barnes Bridge. Moving across, Cambridge took Oxford's clear water and passed the finishing post six seconds and two lengths ahead. It was Cambridge's fourth consecutive victory and took the overall record to 74–68 in their favour. By the end of the race, umpire Cadoux-Hudson had issued 132 warnings to the crews.

In the reserve race, Cambridge's Goldie beat Oxford's Isis by 6 1/2 lengths, and in the 52nd running of the Women's Boat Race, Cambridge also triumphed.

== Reaction ==
Olympic gold medallist Steve Redgrave presented Cambridge with the Beefeater Trophy and both crews with their medals. Oxford's coach Mijnders said "After the big bend, Cambridge were actually flying ... the further the race went on, the better Cambridge rowed". Cambridge coach Williams noted "Some of our boys took some stick in the press, but they responded to the pressure and were brilliant." Oxford's stroke and Olympic bronze medallist Tim Foster told his crew "We'll always remember we lost the Boat Race, but don't forget we are still good rowers." Cadoux-Hudson stated in an interview that there were two occasions where the blades clashed: "Cambridge were being warned on one occasion and Oxford on the other, so I think it equalled out at the end. I don't think it affected the outcome".
