= Boyce Budd =

American rower

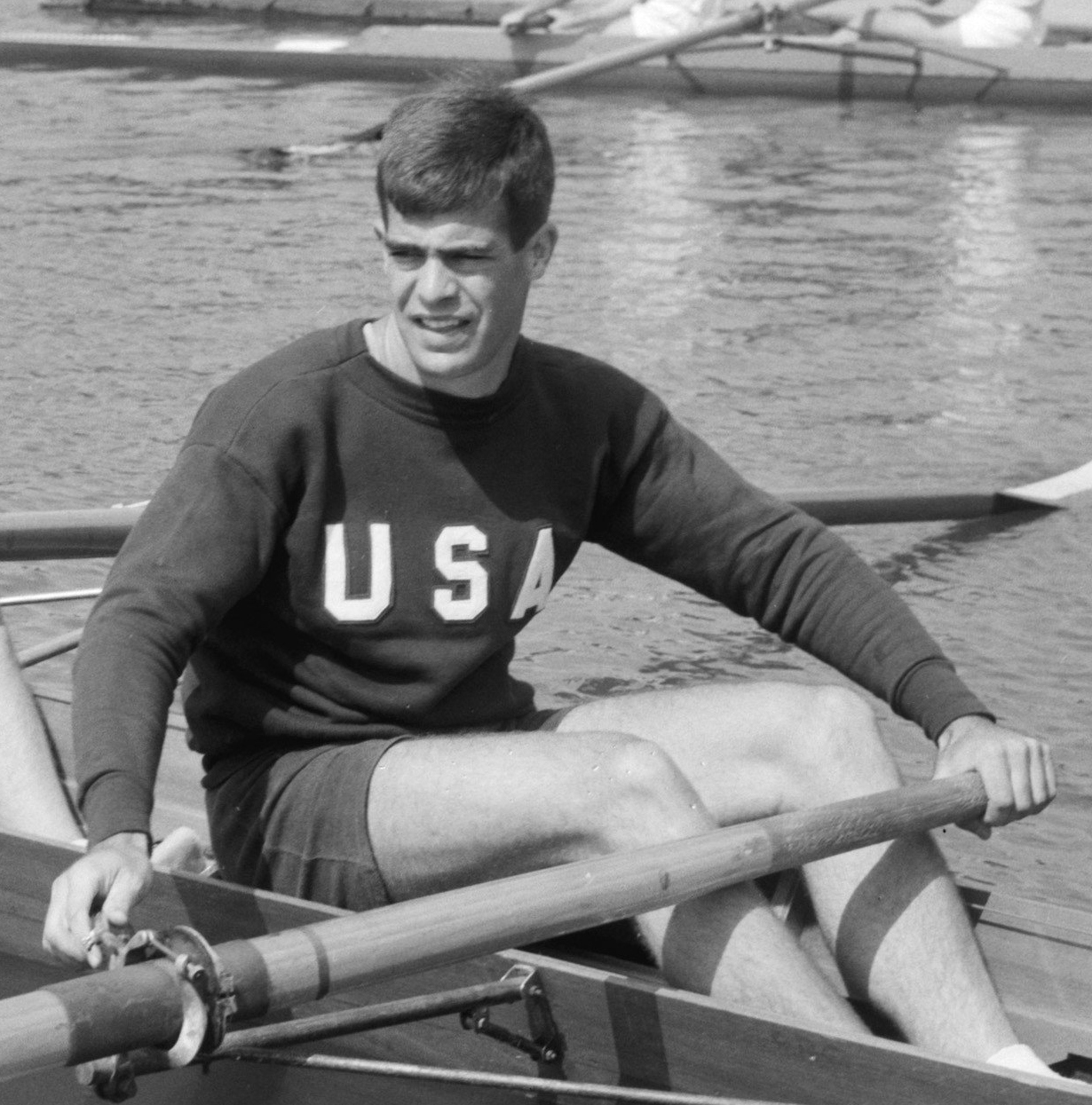
- Budd at the 1964 Rowing Championships

Personal information
- Born: Harold Boyce Budd Jr. January 4, 1939 (age 87) Summit, New Jersey, U.S.
- Height: 191 cm (6 ft 3 in)
- Weight: 93 kg (205 lb)

Sport
- Sport: Rowing
- Club: Vesper Boat Club
Medal record
Representing the United States
Olympic Games
Gold medal – first place	1964 Tokyo	Eight
European Rowing Championships
Bronze medal – third place	1965 Duisburg	Eight

Harold Boyce Budd Jr. (born January 4, 1939) is a retired American competition rower who won a gold medal in the eights at the 1964 Olympics.

Budd graduated from Lawrenceville School in 1957, and then attended Yale University, where he rowed in the varsity eight as a sophomore, and the junior varsity in his junior and senior years. He spent a postgraduate year at Trinity College, Cambridge, and rowed in the winning Cambridge blue boat in the 1962 Boat Race.

He then joined Philadelphia's Vesper Boat Club, winning national titles in the pairs, fours, and eights in 1964 and 1965, as well as an Olympic gold medal in the eights in 1964, and a bronze medal in the eights at the 1965 European championships.

In 1980, Budd's home in Devon, Pennsylvania, was robbed; his Olympic gold medal was stolen and never recovered.
