= Russell Hookway =

Australian rower

Personal information
- Born: January 16, 1962 (age 64)

Sport
- Country: Australia
- Sport: Rowing
- Club: Lindisfarne Rowing Club; Buckingham Rowing Club; Tweed Heads Rowing Club

Achievements and titles
- National finals: King's Cup 1982-83; Penrith Cup 1984-85
Medal record
Men's rowing
Representing Australia

Russell Hookway (born 16 January 1962) is an Australian former representative lightweight rower and coach. He made six representative appearances for his state of Tasmania, was twice an Australian national champion and represented Australia at the 1984 World Rowing Championships.

== Club and state rowing ==
Hookway was raised in Tasmania and took up rowing while at Launceston Grammar. His club rowing in Hobart was initially from the Lindisfarne Rowing Club and then as a lightweight from the Buckingham Rowing Club. He finished his career from the Tweed Heads Rowing Club in northern New South Wales.

Hookway made his state representative debut for Tasmania in the 1980 youth eight which contested the Noel Wilkinson Trophy at the 1980 Australian Interstate Regatta within the Australian Rowing Championships. He made another appearance at stroke in the Tasmanian youth eight of 1981. In 1982 he moved into the Tasmanian men's senior eight which placed second contesting the King's Cup at the annual Interstate Regatta. He again rowed in the Tasmanian King's Cup eight when they placed fourth in 1983.

By 1984 Hookway had moved down to the lightweight division. He raced for Tasmania at the 1984 and 1985 Interstate Regattas in lightweight fours contesting the Penrith Cup. That 1984 crew won a silver medal with Hookway at stroke.

In 1983 in Lindisfarne colours he won his first national title at the Australian Rowing Championships in a coxless four. He was rowing for Buckingham in 1984 when he contested all three sweep oared lightweight events, placed second in the lightweight pair and won his second national championship title in the lightweight eight. Under the continued coaching tutelage of David Poulson he won three silver medals at the 1985 Australian Championships across all three sweep oared lightweight boat classes.

In his final year of top class competition Hookway loaded up to the heavyweight division and in Tweed Heads Rowing Club colours and coached by Ted Hale, raced at the 1986 Australian Rowing Championships in all three sculling boat classes.

== International representative rowing ==
Hookway was selected for national honours in 1984 and raced in the Australian men's lightweight eight when they finished tenth at the 1984 World Rowing Championships. It was his first and last senior Australian representative appearance.

== Rowing family ==
Both of Hookway's sons represented for Australia at the senior level and had podium finishes at underage world championships. Jonothan, whom Russell had coached at stages of his career, was a Junior World Champion in 2006 and raced in the Australian senior lightweight at the 2015 World Rowing Championships. Samuel made Australian senior representative appearances in 2014 and 2015 and had medalled at the U23 World Rowing Championships in 2012.
