= Danny Taylor (rower) =

Irish rower and academic

Personal information
- Full name: Daniel Brumhall Cochrane Taylor
- Nationality: Irish
- Born: 13 May 1921; Portstewart, Northern Ireland
- Died: 31 December 2003 (aged 82)

Sport
- Sport: Rowing

Daniel Brumhall Cochrane Taylor (13 May 1921 – 31 December 2003) was an Irish scientist, university vice-chancellor, and Olympic rower.

== Early life ==
Taylor was born on 13 May 1921 in Portstewart, Northern Ireland. His parents were Daniel Brumhall Taylor and Anna Martha Taylor (née Rice). He received his education at Coleraine Academical Institution and Queen's University Belfast (QUB). From QUB, he graduated BSc (Mech) in 1942, BSc (Elec) in 1943, MSc in 1946, and obtained his PhD in 1948. In 1956, he graduated MA from the University of Cambridge.

Taylor was a member of the Queen's University Belfast Boat Club. He competed in the men's eight event at the 1948 Summer Olympics where the team was eliminated in the repechage. His selection to the team was notable as he was the only member from Northern Ireland; the rest of the team were from the Republic of Ireland. This helped with the Irish Amateur Rowing Union being accepted as a member by the International Rowing Federation (FISA) in September 1948 and ensured that rowing was represented as part of Ireland's inaugural Olympic team; many sports missed out over the dispute by rival Irish sports governing bodies.

After completing his PhD, he taught in engineering at the University of Liverpool (1948–1950) and the University of Nottingham (1950–1953). He then went to the University of Cambridge where he was an ICI Fellow (1953–1956), a lecturer in mechanical sciences (1956–1968), and Fellow of Peterhouse (1958–1968). During 1963, he was a visiting lecturer at the University of Canterbury in Christchurch, New Zealand. At Peterhouse, he was a coach at the Peterhouse Boat Club and his 1956 team won the Lent Bumps. The rowing club's first eight trained in a shell named Danny Taylor. After this boat got destroyed, Taylor's widow launched a coxed four shell in April 2006 that was to bear her late husband's name.

== Life in New Zealand ==
In 1968, Taylor was appointed as vice-chancellor of Victoria University of Wellington. His first day, 10 April 1968, coincided with sinking of the TEV Wahine in Wellington Harbour. He was at Victoria during difficult times, with enrolments declining due to increasing competition by the relatively new Massey University, the 1973 oil shocks, the government funding cut of 1976, and the 1981 state sector-wide cut. Taylor was succeeded as vice-chancellor in 1982 by Ian Axford.

Taylor had married Elizabeth Page in 1955. They had one son and one daughter. In 1990, they lived in Upper Hutt. His recreational interests were golf and gardening. Taylor died on 31 December 2003 at age 82. He was survived by his wife. His daughter, Ann Elizabeth Taylor, married the physicist Michael Kelly.

== Sources ==
- Barrowman, Rachel (1999). "The whole ramshackle machine". Victoria University of Wellington 1899–1999 : A History. Wellington: Victoria University Press.
- Lambert, Max (1991). Who's Who in New Zealand, 1991 (12th ed.). Auckland: Octopus. ISBN 9780790001302.
