= The Boat Race 1962 =

108th Boat Race
- Date: 7 April 1962
- Winner: Cambridge
- Margin of victory: 5 lengths
- Winning time: 19 minutes 46 seconds
- Overall record (Cambridge–Oxford): 59–48
- Umpire: Ran Laurie (Cambridge)

The 108th Boat Race took place on 7 April 1962. Held annually, the Boat Race is a side-by-side rowing race between crews from the Universities of Oxford and Cambridge along the River Thames. Umpired by former Blue, Ran Laurie, it was won by Cambridge by five lengths in a time of 19 minutes 46 seconds. The race featured the heaviest oarsman since the inaugural race in 1829.

== Background ==
The Boat Race is a side-by-side rowing competition between the University of Oxford (sometimes referred to as the "Dark Blues") and the University of Cambridge (sometimes referred to as the "Light Blues"). First held in 1829, the race takes place on the 4.2-mile (6.8 km) Championship Course on the River Thames in southwest London. The rivalry is a major point of honour between the two universities; it is followed throughout the United Kingdom and, as of 2014, broadcast worldwide. Cambridge went into the race as reigning champions, having won the 1961 race by 4 1/4 lengths, and led overall with 58 victories to Oxford's 48 (excluding the "dead heat" of 1877).

Cambridge were coached by J. R. F. Best, James Crowden (who rowed twice for Cambridge, in the 1951 and 1952 races), Brian Lloyd (a three-time Blue, rowing in the 1949, 1950 and 1951 races) and Harold Rickett (who rowed in the 1930, 1931 and 1932 races). Oxford's coaches were Jumbo Edwards (who rowed for Oxford in the 1926 and 1930 races), Ronnie Howard (who represented Oxford in the 1957 and 1959 races) and Antony Rowe (who had rowed in the 1948 and 1949 races). Although the Cambridge crew were favourites on their arrival at Putney, and were reckoned to be "one of the best Boat Race crews for ten years", their early performances in practice did not impress the critics. However, in their final row before the race, Cambridge took four seconds off the record time from the Mile Post to Putney Bridge, covering the distance in 4 minutes 6 seconds.

The race was umpired by Ran Laurie who had rowed for Cambridge in the 1934, 1935 and 1936 races, and had gone on to win a gold medal for Great Britain at the 1948 Summer Olympics.

== Crews ==
The Oxford crew weighed an average of 13 st 2.75 lb (83.6 kg), 2.75 pounds (1.2 kg) per rower more than their opponents. The Cambridge crew saw two former Blues return, bow R. Nicholson, and number four A. J. Collier. Similarly, Oxford's crew contained two rowers with Boat Race experience, including C. M. Davis who was rowing at stroke for the third consecutive year. Two non-British participants were registered in the race, both in the Cambridge crew: John Lecky, rowing at number five was a Canadian Olympic oarsman while American Boyce Budd occupied the six seat. Budd, at 15 st 1 lb (95.5 kg) was the heaviest oarsman to feature in the Boat Race since J. J. Toogood who rowed for Oxford in the inaugural race in 1829.

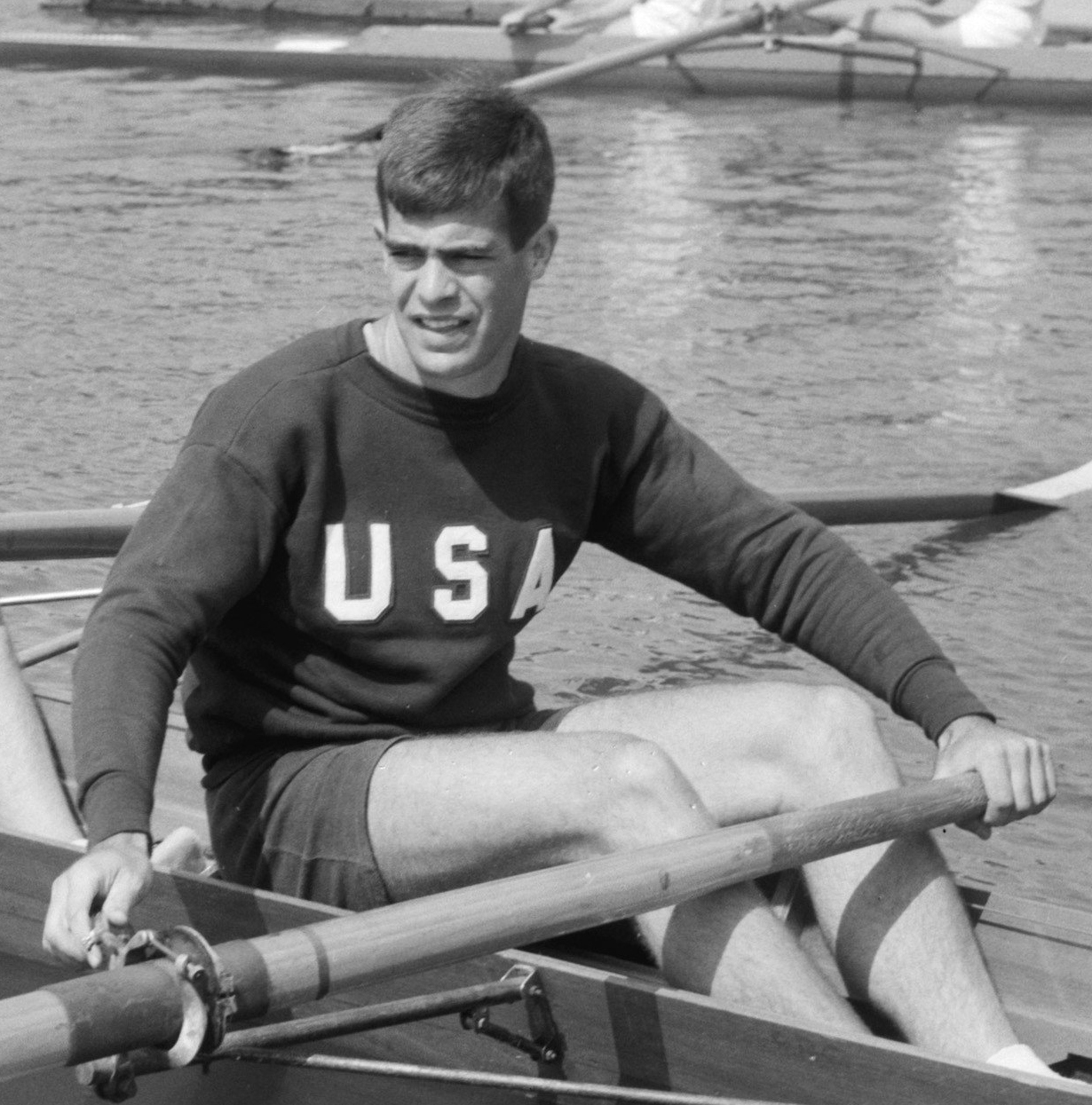
American rower Boyce Budd (pictured in 1964) occupied the number 6 seat for Cambridge.

| Seat | Oxford | | | Cambridge | | |
| Seat | Name | College | Weight | Name | College | Weight |
|---|---|---|---|---|---|---|
| Bow | N. D. Tinne | Keble | 12 st 7 lb | R. G. Nicholson (P) | St Catharine's | 12 st 4 lb |
| 2 | D. D. S. Skailes | Keble | 13 st 4 lb | C. T. Davey | Jesus | 11 st 6 lb |
| 3 | J. Y. Scarlett | Christ Church | 13 st 10 lb | R. A. Napier | Lady Margaret Boat Club | 13 st 0 lb |
| 4 | R. A. Morton | Keble | 13 st 8 lb | A. J. Collier | Lady Margaret Boat Club | 13 st 4 lb |
| 5 | J. C. D. Sherratt | St Edmund Hall | 13 st 4 lb | J. M. S. Lecky | Jesus | 14 st 1 lb |
| 6 | T. W. Tennant | New College | 13 st 12 lb | H. B. Budd | 1st & 3rd Trinity | 15 st 1 lb |
| 7 | P. C. D. Burnell | Magdalen | 12 st 13 lb | J. N. L. Tollemache | 1st & 3rd Trinity | 13 st 9 lb |
| Stroke | C. M. Davis (P) | Lincoln | 12 st 6 lb | Lord Chewton | 1st & 3rd Trinity | 11 st 3 lb |
| Cox | C. M. Strong | Keble | 8 st 6 lb | R. Walmsley | Queens' | 9 st 0 lb |
Source: (P) – boat club president

== Race ==
The Championship Course, along which the race is conducted

Cambridge won the toss and elected to start from the Surrey station, handing the Middlesex side of the river to Oxford. The race commenced at 3.45 p.m., with the Dark Blues making a better start and quickly held the lead, as Cambridge had a "sticky second stroke". With both crews rating 34 strokes per minute, the Light Blues quickly restored parity before taking the lead and holding a one-length advantage by Craven Steps. A spurt from Oxford reduced the deficit to half a length but Cambridge began to pull away again, despite being outrated by the Dark Blues. Another spurt at the Crab Tree saw the two crews level by Harrods Furniture Depository, and as they passed below Hammersmith Bridge.

There, the Cambridge cox succeeded in forcing the Oxford boat wide and into rough water, and took advantage, drawing clear above Chiswick Eyot. To avoid the breaking waves, Oxford pulled in behind the Light Blue boat and as such, the race as a contest was effectively ended. Cambridge continued to pull away and passed the finishing post with a lead of five lengths in a time of 19 minutes 46 seconds, the slowest winning time since the 1954 race. It was Cambridge's second consecutive victory and their largest winning margin since the 1955 race. According to the rowing correspondent for The Times, "for Cambridge this was a most convincing though not unexpected victory".
