= Jonothan Hookway =

Australian rower

Personal information
- Born: 9 December 1988 (age 37)

Sport
- Country: Australia
- Sport: Rowing
- Club: Buckingham Rowing Club; MUBC
Medal record
Men's rowing
Representing Australia
Junior World Rowing Championships
Gold medal – first place	2006 Amsterdam	BM2-

Jonothan Hamish Hookway (born 9 December 1988) is an Australian former representative lightweight rower. He was a junior world champion in 2006.

== Club, state & varsity rowing ==
Hookway was raised in Tasmania and attended the Hutchins School where he took up rowing. His senior club rowing was from the Buckingham Rowing Club and later the Melbourne University Boat Club.

Hookway made his representative debut for his home state of Tasmania at the 2006 Interstate Regatta within the Australian Rowing Championships contesting the Noel Wilkinson Trophy in the men's youth eight. He raced for Tasmania again in 2007 in the lightweight four, stroking the crew to a silver medal win. In 2008 he was back in the Tasmanian youth eight.

In Buckingham colours he won a silver medal in the U23 LM2X at the Australian Rowing Championships in 2007. In 2010 racing for Melbourne University Boat Club he won a national title in the U23 lightweight coxless four.

== International representative rowing ==
Hookway made his Australian representative debut at the 2006 Junior World Rowing Championships in Amsterdam while still in Year 12 at school. With his Hutchins School mate Adam Wertheimer he rowed to a gold medal victory in Australia's junior coxless pair.

In 2007 aged 18 at the U23 World Rowing Championships in Glasgow he stroked the Australian men's lightweight coxless four to a ninth-place finish. In 2010 he was again selected to stroke the Australian lightweight coxless four when they finished sixth at the U23 World Championships in Belarus.

Hookway raced in the Australian men's lightweight quad scull when they finished seventh at the 2015 World Rowing Championships. It was his first and last Australian senior representative appearance.

== Rowing family ==
Jonothan Hookway is the older brother of Samuel Hookway an Australian representative rower who medalled at U23 World Rowing Championships in 2012. Their father Russell Hookway was an Australian champion lightweight rower who made national representation at the 1984 World Rowing Championships.
