= The Boat Race 2019 =

Oxford–Cambridge boat races

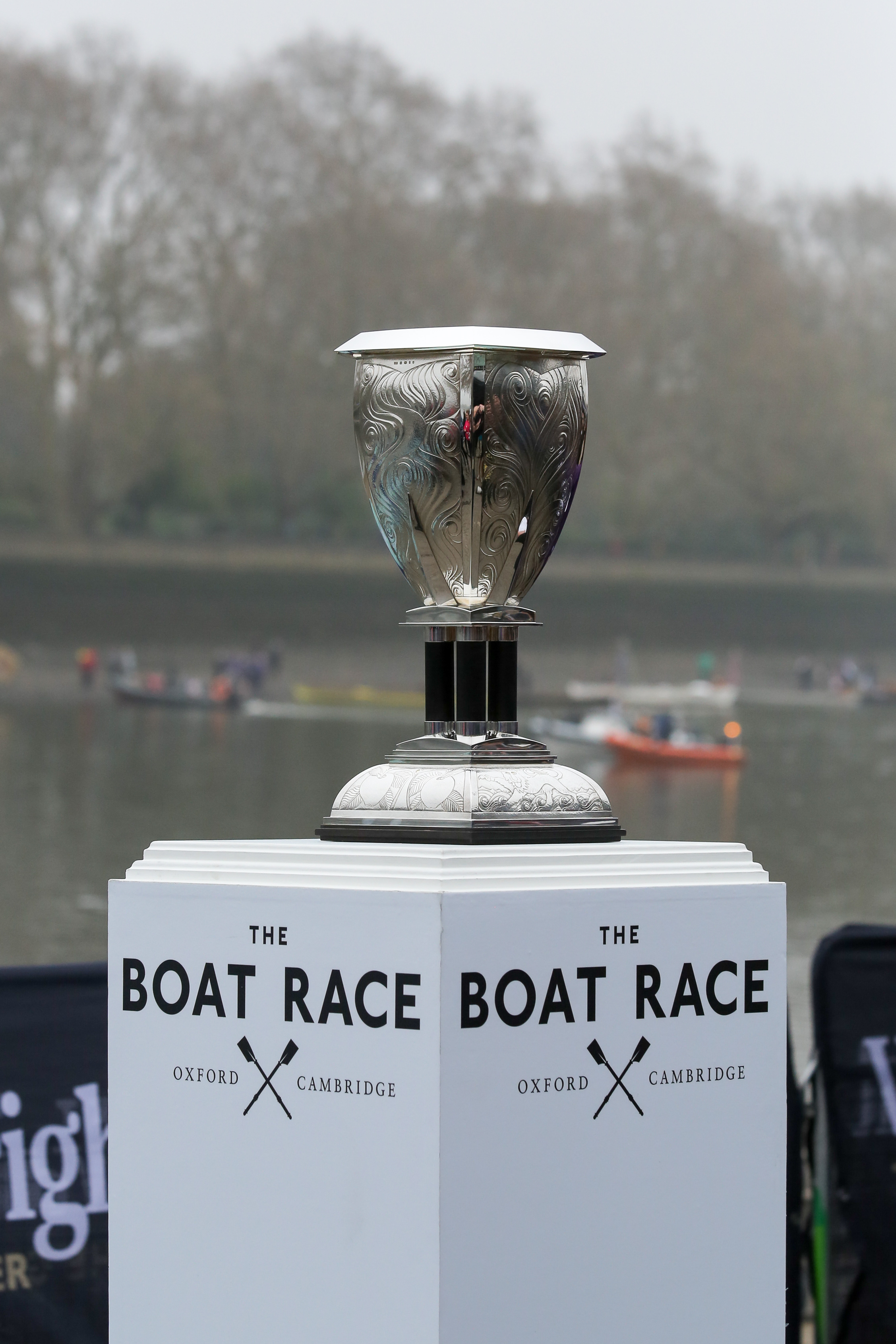
- The 2019 Women's Boat Race trophy
- Date: 7 April 2019

Men's race
- Winner: Cambridge
- Margin of victory: 1 length
- Winning time: 16:57
- Overall record (Cambridge–Oxford): 84–80
- Umpire: Rob Clegg

Women's race
- Winner: Cambridge
- Margin of victory: 5 lengths
- Winning time: 18:47
- Overall record (Cambridge–Oxford): 44–30
- Umpire: Richard Phelps

Reserves' races
- Men's winners: Goldie
- Women's winners: Blondie

The Boat Race 2019 took place on 7 April 2019. Held annually, The Boat Race is a side-by-side rowing race between crews from the universities of Oxford and Cambridge along a 4.2-mile (6.8 km) tidal stretch of the River Thames in south-west London. This was the 74th women's race and the 165th men's race, and, for the fourth time in the history of the event, the men's, women's and both reserves' races were all held on the Tideway on the same day.

The women's race was the first event of the day, and saw Cambridge lead from the start, eventually winning by a considerable margin. It was their third consecutive victory, taking the overall record in the Women's Boat Race to 44–30 in their favour. The men's race was the final event of the day and completed a second consecutive whitewash as Cambridge won; it was their third victory in four years, taking the overall record to 84–80 in their favour. In the women's reserve race, Cambridge's Blondie defeated Oxford's Osiris, their fourth consecutive victory. The men's reserve race was won by Cambridge's Goldie, who defeated Oxford's Isis.

The races were watched live by thousands of spectators lining the banks of the Thames. They were also live-streamed on YouTube and by multiple media organisations around the world, including in Germany, South Africa and China.

== Background ==
The Championship Course along which, for the fourth time in the history of the event, the men's, women's and both reserves' races were conducted on the same day

The Boat Race is a side-by-side rowing competition between the University of Oxford (sometimes referred to as the "Dark Blues") and the University of Cambridge (sometimes referred to as the "Light Blues"). First held in 1829, the race takes place on the 4.2-mile (6.8 km) Championship Course, between Putney and Mortlake on the River Thames in south-west London. The rivalry is a major point of honour between the two universities; the race is followed throughout the United Kingdom and broadcast worldwide. Cambridge went into the race as champions, having won the 2018 race by a margin of three lengths, and led overall with 83 victories to Oxford's 80 (excluding the 1877 race, a dead heat).

It was the fourth time in the history of The Boat Race that all four senior races – the men's, women's, men's reserves' and women's reserves' – were held on the same day and on the same course along the Tideway. Before 2015, the women's race, which first took place in 1927, was usually held at the Henley Boat Races along the 2,000-metre (2,200 yd) course. However, on at least two occasions in the interwar period, the women competed on the Thames between Chiswick and Kew. Cambridge's women went into the race as reigning champions, having won the 2018 race by seven lengths, and led 43–30 overall.

The autumn reception, where the previous year's losing team challenges the winners to a rematch the next spring, was held at the Guildhall in London on 8 November 2018. As Cambridge's women had won the previous year's race, it was Oxford's responsibility to offer the traditional challenge to the Cambridge University Women's Boat Club (CUWBC). To that end, Eleanor Shearer, President of Oxford University Women's Boat Club (OUWBC), laid down the gauntlet to Abigail Parker, her Cambridge counterpart. Cambridge's victory in the men's race meant that Felix Drinkall, President of Oxford University Boat Club (OUBC), challenged Dara Alizadeh, President of Cambridge University Boat Club (CUBC).

The 74th women's race was umpired by Richard Phelps, a former rower who successfully represented Cambridge in the 1993, 1994 and 1995 races. He had previously umpired the men's race once, in 2014. The 165th men's race was umpired by Rob Clegg, who rowed for the Dark Blues in the 1994, 1995 and 1996 races. He umpired the women's race in 2016. The women's reserve race was overseen by Tony Reynolds, while the men's reserve race was umpired by multiple Olympic gold-medallist Matthew Pinsent. As well as rowing for Oxford in the 1990, 1991 and 1993 races, he was assistant umpire in the 2012 race before umpiring the 2013 men's race and the 2018 women's race.

On 30 January 2019, the Royal National Lifeboat Institution was announced as the official charity partner for the event. The event was broadcast live in the United Kingdom on the BBC. Numerous broadcasters worldwide also showed the main races, including SuperSport across Africa, the EBU across Europe and CCTV-5 in China. It was also streamed live on BBC Online and YouTube.

== Coaches ==
The Cambridge men's crew coaching team was led by their chief coach, Rob Baker, who had previously coached CUWBC to victories in both the 2017 and 2018 races. He was assisted by Richard Chambers, silver medallist in the men's lightweight coxless four at the 2012 Summer Olympics. Donald Legget, who rowed for the Light Blues in the 1963 and 1964 races acted as a supporting coach, along with coxing coach Henry Fieldman (who steered Cambridge in the 2013 race) and the medical officer Simon Owens. Sean Bowden was chief coach for Oxford, having been responsible for the senior men's crew since 1997, winning 12 from 19 races. He is a former Great Britain Olympic coach and coached the Light Blues in the 1993 and 1994 Boat Races. His assistant coach was Brendan Gliddon.

Cambridge women's chief coach was Robert Weber, who joined Cambridge University from Hamilton College in New York, where he was Head Rowing Coach and Associate Professor of Physical Education. He was assisted by Paddy Ryan and Astrid Cohnen. Oxford women's chief coach was the former OUBC assistant coach Andy Nelder, who previously worked with Bowden for eleven years. He was assisted by James Powell.

== Trials ==
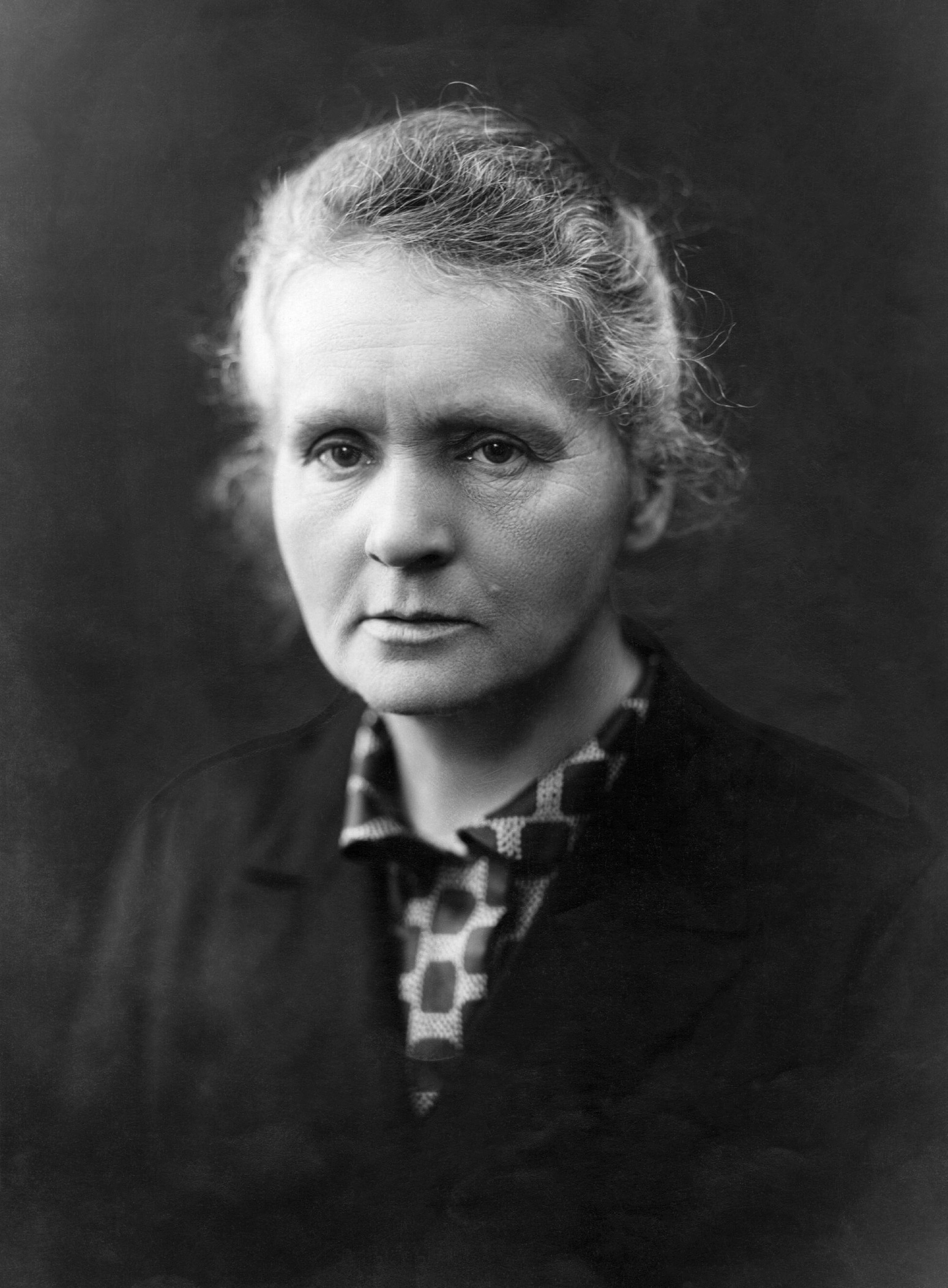
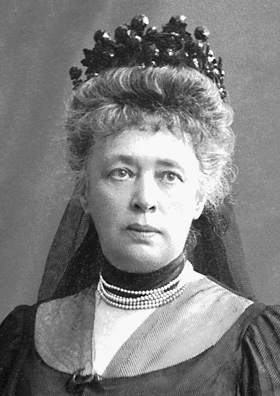
CUWBC's trial boats were named after Nobel Prize winners Marie Curie (left) and Bertha von Suttner.

Dates for the trials, where crews are able to simulate the race proper on the Championship Course, were announced on 23 November 2018.

=== Women ===
Oxford's women's trial took place on the Championship Course on 7 December, between Blitzen and Comet, named after two of Santa Claus's reindeer. Comet, coxed by the OUWBC president Eleanor Shearer, took an early lead and held a length's advantage by Craven Cottage. Extending their lead to two lengths by Hammersmith Bridge, Comet moved across Blitzen to control the remainder of the race. In deteriorating conditions, Comet coped better and won by three lengths.

Cambridge's trial race was held on the Championship Course on 10 December, between Curie and Suttner, named after Nobel Prize winners Marie Curie and Bertha von Suttner. Suttner won the toss and elected to start from the Surrey station. Curie held an early lead but a push from Suttner towards Hammersmith Bridge levelled the race, umpire Richard Phelps having to warn both crews for encroachment. A clash of blades halfway down Chiswick Eyot resulted in Suttner's bow rower being unseated; Curie took advantage and rowed several lengths clear before the umpire halted the race. After the restart from Chiswick Pier, Curie held a slight lead at Barnes Bridge and took advantage of the bend of the river to pass the finishing line with a clear-water advantage.

=== Men ===
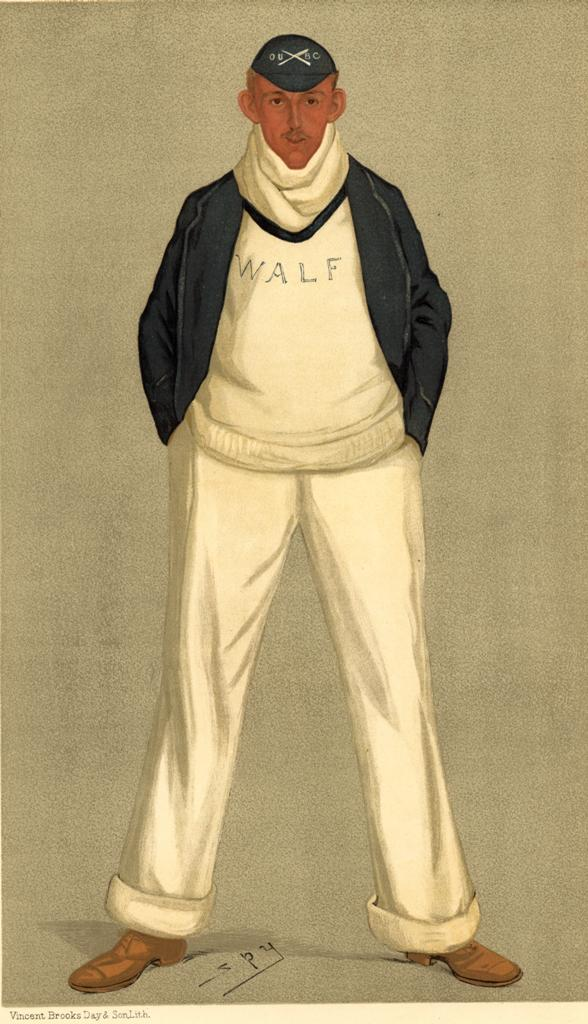
Vanity Fair caricature of William Fletcher

Oxford's trial race was held on the Championship Course on 7 December, between Reggie and Flea, named in commemoration of Second Lieutenant Reginald Fletcher, who rowed for OUBC in the 1914 race, and Lieutenant Colonel William Fletcher, a member of the Dark Blue crew in four consecutive races between 1890 and 1893. The trial took place without Oxford's president, Felix Drinkall, who was absent due to injury. After a close start and in windy, wet conditions, Flea took a slight advantage while Reggie was warned for encroachment. More aggressive steering from Reggie around the Hammersmith bend saw them take a half-length lead which they maintained past St Paul's School. Flea pushed along Chiswick Eyot and in calmer waters re-took the lead and were a length ahead as they rowed away from Barnes Bridge. They increased their lead to pass the finishing line nearly two lengths ahead of Reggie.

Cambridge's men's trial took place on the Championship Course on 10 December, between Roger and Lancelot, named in honour of two alumni killed in action during the First World War. Lieutenant Colonel Roger Kerrison had rowed in the 1893 and 1894 races while Lieutenant Lancelot Ridley coxed in both the 1913 and 1914 races. Roger won the toss and elected to start from the Surrey station, with the race taking place in "testing conditions". Following warnings from the umpire Rob Clegg, Roger was forced to steer off-course, allowing Lancelot to take advantage, and hold a lead of more than a length by Hammersmith Bridge. They continued to dominate the race and crossed the finishing line several lengths ahead of Roger.

== Buildup ==
The official fixtures to be raced in advance of The Boat Race were announced on 11 February 2019.

=== Women ===
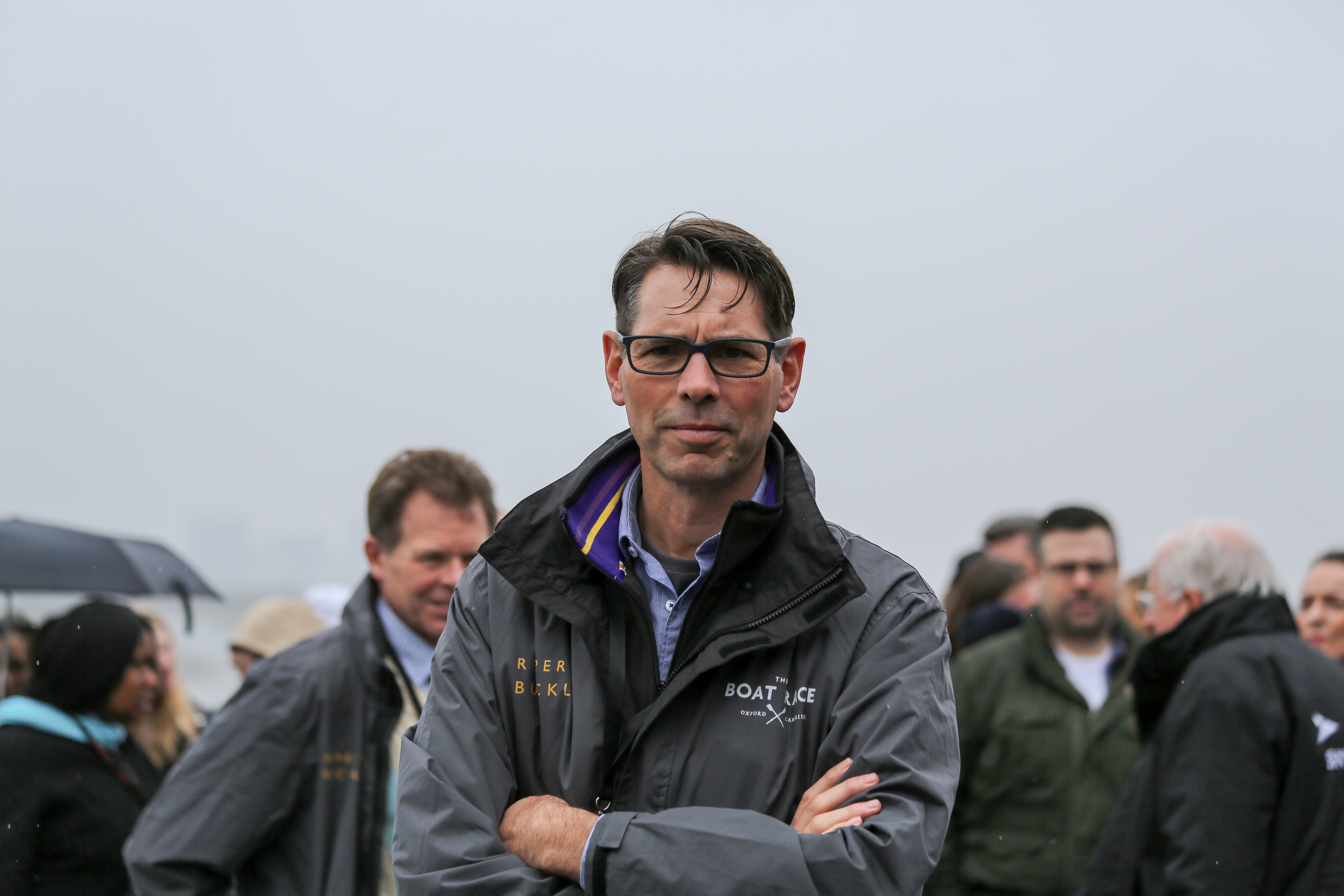
Richard Phelps umpired OUWBC against Imperial during the build-up to the main races.

On 23 February 2019, CUWBC faced a crew from Nereus Rowing Club in two races along sections of the Championship Course. In good weather conditions, the first piece saw Nereus take an early lead, the Dutch crew holding a length's lead by Fulham Wall. CUWBC's cox steered a wide course into slower water allowing Nereus to extend their lead to three lengths by the Mile Post. Although CUWBC reduced the deficit by a length on the approach to the Harrods Furniture Depository, the race concluded at Chiswick Steps with Nereus two lengths ahead. The second race, from Chiswick Eyot to the finishing post, started well for Cambridge, who held a slender lead until Barnes Bridge whereupon Nereus drew level, and following a push, crossed the finishing line a quarter of a length ahead. Two days later, OUWBC raced in a three-piece set of five-minute races along the Championship Course against Imperial College, umpired by Richard Phelps. Starting from Putney Bridge, the first race saw Oxford take an early lead which they extended with ease to pass the winning line at Harrods by four lengths. Imperial started the second race, commencing from St Paul's School, with a length's head start. Oxford were level within two minutes and despite being warned for steering infringements, went on to win the race by three lengths. The third piece started with a half-length head start to Imperial, and once again, although Oxford were warned for aggressive steering, they closed the gap quickly and had clear water advantage with two minutes of the race remaining. They won the race by three and a half lengths.

CUWBC raced their final fixture on 3 March 2019 against Oxford Brookes University Boat Club (OBUBC) in three pieces. Taking place in poor and worsening conditions, the first race, from the start to the Mile Post, was close throughout, but Cambridge led from the outset and passed the finish line half a length ahead. The second piece, from Harrods to Chiswick Steps, once again saw Cambridge take the lead and with OBUBC's cox steering to avoid windy conditions, CUWBC pulled away to a clear win. The final race, from the Bandstand to the finishing post, was dominated again by Cambridge, who coped with the difficult conditions better than their opposition, to win by three and a half lengths. OUWBC faced a crew from Molesey in a two-piece set along the Championship Course on 23 March 2019. In the first race, from Putney to Chiswick Eyot, Molesey took an early lead, but with the course of the river in the Dark Blues' favour, OUWBC drew level by Craven Cottage, on the straight towards Hammersmith Bridge. OUWBC continued to press and extended their lead out to one and a half lengths before passing the finish line at Chiswick. The second piece, between Chiswick and the finishing post, saw Molesey take the lead once again before Oxford redressed the balance by Barnes Bridge. A hard-fought race ended with OUWBC passing the finishing line a quarter of a length ahead.

=== Men ===
OUBC were scheduled to race against OBUBC on 10 March 2019, but the fixture was postponed as a result of poor weather conditions. The fixture was reorganised and took place on 17 March 2019, in two pieces. The first race was from Chiswick Steps to Beverley Brook, and despite OUBC winning the toss and taking the more favourable Surrey side of the river, it was Oxford Brookes who took the early lead. By Hammersmith Bridge, OBUBC had a clear water advantage over the Dark Blues, finishing the race well ahead. The second piece, along the same section of the Championship Course, saw the crews switch starting stations, but a similar outcome. OUBC made a good start but OBUBC quickly overtook them and pulled away to win comfortably. On 23 March 2019, OUBC raced against Leander Club from the Championship Course start line to Chiswick Steps. From the start, it was a close fixture with neither boat showing real dominance and the umpire Rob Clegg having to issue multiple warnings as both crews infringed each other's racing line. Oxford held a slight lead by the Mile Post but Leander responded to draw level as the crews passed Harrods, and took the lead at Chiswick Eyot. Warned once again by the umpire, Leander course correction allowed the Dark Blues into faster water, and into a canvas lead which they held to the conclusion of the race.

The fixture between CUBC and OBUBC was due to be held on 13 March 2019 but was postponed because of adverse weather. Instead, it was held on 24 March. The OBUBC crew included World Champion gold medallist Matthew Tarrant and former Dark Blue Josh Bugajski. In the first of two pieces, CUBC took early advantage and were ahead at the Mile Post, but Oxford Brookes responded at Harrods with a push to see them move ahead. With the bend in the river against the Light Blues, OBUBC extended their lead to three-quarters of a length along Chiswick Eyot and winning the race. The second piece once again saw CUBC take the lead, almost out to a length, before a clash of oars resulted in one of the CUBC oarsmen catching a crab. OBUBC moved past Cambridge and despite efforts to row with a broken backstay, CUBC ended the race nearly a length behind their opponents.

== Crews ==
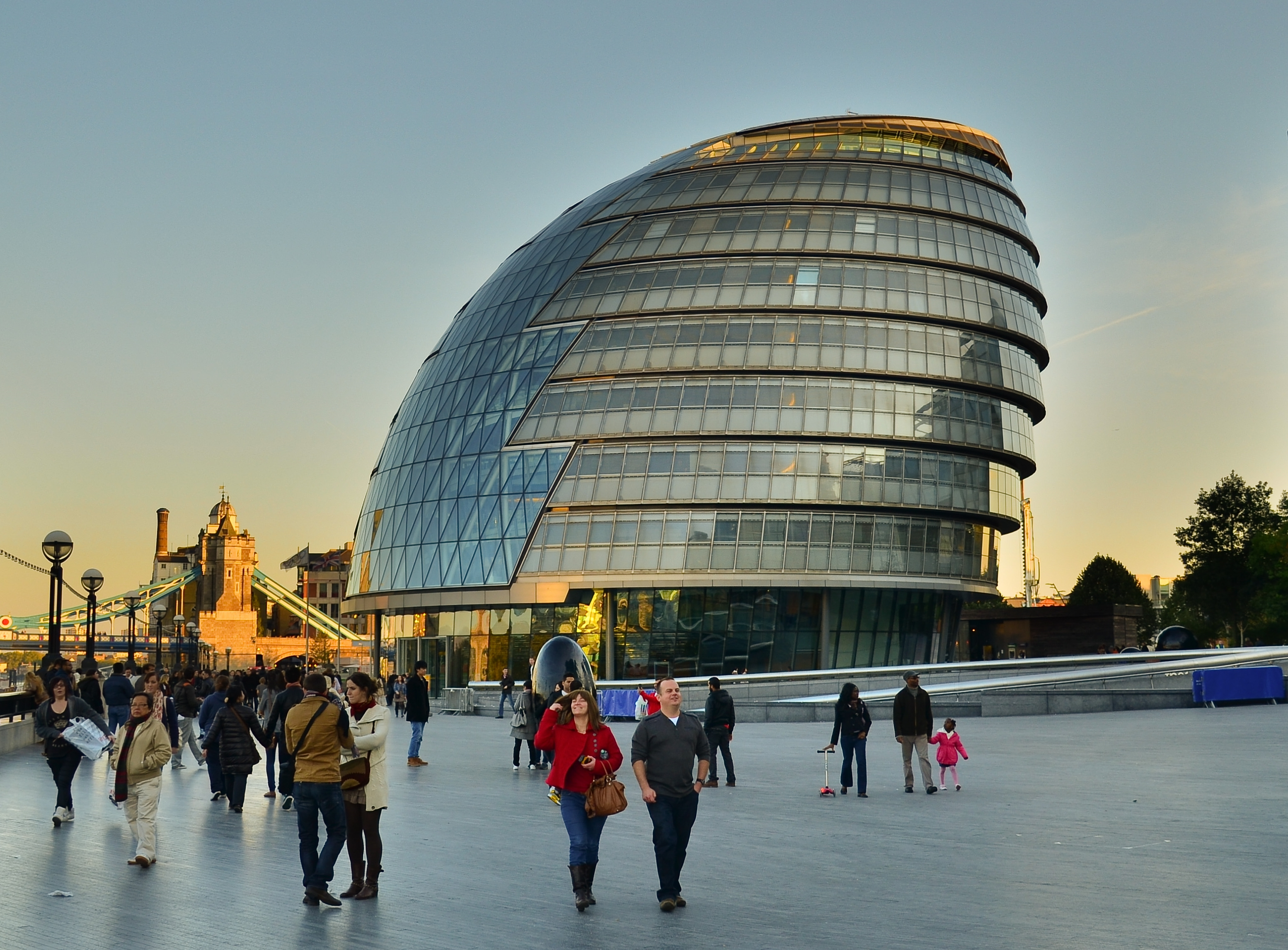
City Hall, London, where the official weigh-in took place

The official weigh-in for the crews took place at City Hall, London, on 14 March 2019, and was hosted by BBC broadcaster Andrew Cotter.

=== Women ===
The Cambridge crew weighed an average of 72.3 kilograms (159 lb), 1.2 kilograms (2.6 lb) more per rower than their opponents, and stand at an average height of 178.9 cm (5 ft 10 1/2 in), 1.8 centimetres (0.71 in) taller than Oxford. OUWBC saw two former Blues return from last year's crew, in Renée Koolschijn and Beth Bridgman, while Cambridge's crew contained just one rower with Boat Race experience: Tricia Smith was a member of the victorious 2018 Light Blue boat.

Seat	Oxford					Cambridge				
Seat	Name	Nationality	College	Height	Weight	Name	Nationality	College	Height	Weight
Bow	Issy Dodds	British	Hertford	172 cm (5 ft 7 1/2 in)	70.5 kg (155 lb)	Tricia Smith	British	Christ's	178 cm (5 ft 10 in)	69.9 kg (154 lb)
2	Anna Murgatroyd	British	Christ Church	178 cm (5 ft 10 in)	69.9 kg (154 lb)	Sophie Deans	New Zealand/Australian	Murray Edwards	175 cm (5 ft 9 in)	69.5 kg (153 lb)
3	Renée Koolschijn	Dutch	Keble	180 cm (5 ft 11 in)	73.8 kg (163 lb)	Laura Foster	American	Queens'	185 cm (6 ft 1 in)	77.1 kg (170 lb)
4	Lizzie Polgreen	British	Linacre	168 cm (5 ft 6 in)	60.7 kg (134 lb)	Larkin Sayre	British/American	Emmanuel	173 cm (5 ft 8 in)	71.8 kg (158 lb)
5	Tina Christmann	German/Italian	Worcester	178 cm (5 ft 10 in)	72.2 kg (159 lb)	Kate Horvat	American	Jesus	185 cm (6 ft 1 in)	69.5 kg (153 lb)
6	Beth Bridgman	British	St Hugh's	176 cm (5 ft 9 1/2 in)	70.4 kg (155 lb)	Pippa Whittaker	British	Christ's	182 cm (5 ft 11 1/2 in)	74.1 kg (163 lb)
7	Liv Pryer	British	St Edmund Hall	185 cm (6 ft 1 in)	77.3 kg (170 lb)	Ida Gørtz Jacobsen	Danish	Newnham	175 cm (5 ft 9 in)	71.9 kg (159 lb)
Stroke	Amelia Standing	British	St Anne's	180 cm (5 ft 11 in)	74.0 kg (163.1 lb)	Lily Lindsay	American/British	Pembroke	179 cm (5 ft 10 1/2 in)	74.3 kg (164 lb)
Cox	Eleanor Shearer (P)	British	Nuffield	160 cm (5 ft 3 in)	47.0 kg (103.6 lb)	Hugh Spaughton	British/Japanese	Jesus	165 cm (5 ft 5 in)	57.0 kg (125.7 lb)
Sources: (P) – Boat club president (Abigail Parker is the president of CUWBC. She rowed in Blondie.)

=== Men ===
The Oxford crew weighed an average of 90.0 kg (198.4 lb), just 0.2 kg (0.4 lb) more than their opponents, while the average height of rowers in each crew was identical, at 194.6 cm (6 ft 4 1/2 in). The Dark Blues included two rowers who had participated in the previous year's race in the OUBC president Felix Drinkall and Benedict Aldous. Cambridge also included two former Blues, Dara Alizadeh and Freddie Davidson (who had also rowed in the 2017 race), and Matthew Holland, who had coxed CUWBC to victory in 2017. The Light Blue crew also contained two-time Olympic champion James Cracknell who, at the age of 46, became the oldest competitor to take part in the Boat Race.

Seat	Oxford					Cambridge				
Seat	Name	Nationality	College	Height	Weight	Name	Nationality	College	Height	Weight
Bow	Achim Harzheim‡	German	Oriel	192 cm (6 ft 3 1/2 in)	88.8 kg (196 lb)	Dave Bell	British	Homerton	186 cm (6 ft 1 in)	84.5 kg (186 lb)
2	Ben Landis	German	Lincoln	190 cm (6 ft 3 in)	86.1 kg (190 lb)	James Cracknell	British	Peterhouse	193 cm (6 ft 4 in)	89.7 kg (198 lb)
3	Patrick Sullivan‡	British	Wadham	202 cm (6 ft 7 1/2 in)	90.7 kg (200 lb)	Grant Bitler	American	Hughes Hall	199 cm (6 ft 6 1/2 in)	95.8 kg (211 lb)
4	Benedict Aldous‡	British	Christ Church	195 cm (6 ft 5 in)	97.4 kg (215 lb)	Dara Alizadeh (P)	Bermudian/British/ American/Iranian	Hughes Hall	194 cm (6 ft 4 1/2 in)	94.0 kg (207.2 lb)
5	Tobias Schroder	British/Estonian	Magdalen	201 cm (6 ft 7 in)	98.7 kg (218 lb)	Callum Sullivan	British	Downing	195 cm (6 ft 5 in)	88.2 kg (194 lb)
6	Felix Drinkall (P)	British	Lady Margaret Hall	197 cm (6 ft 5 1/2 in)	84.3 kg (186 lb)	Samuel Hookway	Australian	Peterhouse	197 cm (6 ft 5 1/2 in)	89.0 kg (196.2 lb)
7	Charlie Pearson‡	British	Trinity	187 cm (6 ft 1 1/2 in)	84.3 kg (186 lb)	Freddie Davidson	British	Emmanuel	190 cm (6 ft 3 in)	85.8 kg (189 lb)
Stroke	Augustin Wambersie	Belgian	St Catherine's	193 cm (6 ft 4 in)	89.3 kg (197 lb)	Natan Węgrzycki-Szymczyk	Polish	Peterhouse	203 cm (6 ft 8 in)	94.3 kg (208 lb)
Cox	Anna Carbery‡	British/Greek	Pembroke	164 cm (5 ft 4 1/2 in)	54.7 kg (121 lb)	Matthew Holland	British	Gonville and Caius	169 cm (5 ft 6 1/2 in)	53.6 kg (118 lb)
Source: (P) – Boat club president ‡ – Benedict Aldous and Anna Carbery were subsequently replaced by Charlie Buchanan and Toby de Mendonca, with Harzheim moving from bow to three, Sullivan moving from three to four, Pearson moving from seven to bow, and Buchanan coming in at seven.

== Races ==
The OUBC crew presented at the official introduction at City Hall was modified before the race. Charlie Buchanan replaced Benedict Aldous, and rowed in the seven seat, while cox Anna Carbery was replaced by Toby de Mendonca. The races were held on 7 April 2019 in overcast conditions.

At around 3:30 p.m., police dispersed a protest by "Cambridge Zero Carbon" and "Oxford Climate Justice Campaign" on Hammersmith Bridge. Both organisations were protesting against investments by both universities in fossil fuels.

=== Reserves ===
Cambridge's Blondie and Goldie won the women's and men's reserve races by five lengths and one length respectively.

=== Women's ===
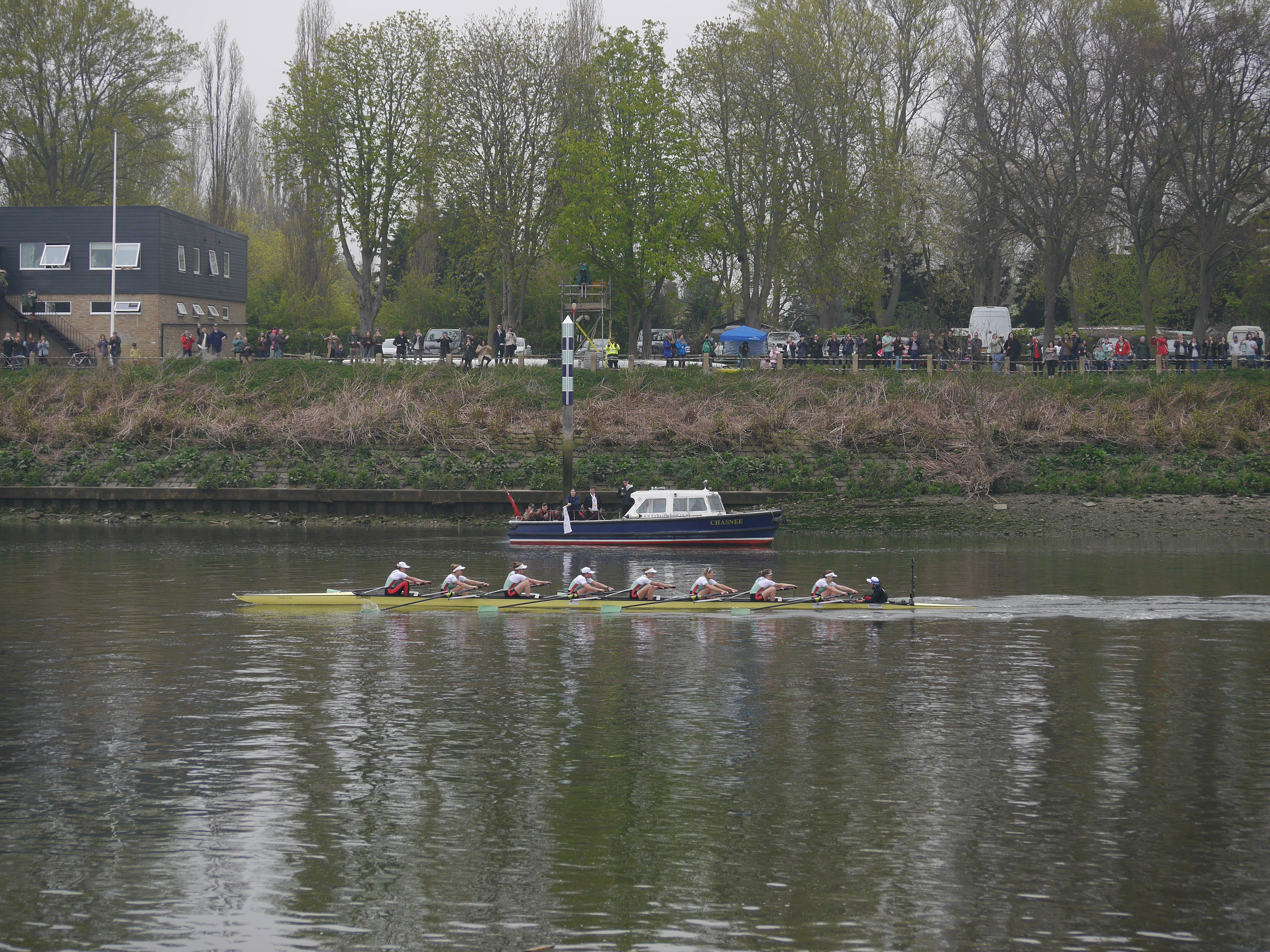
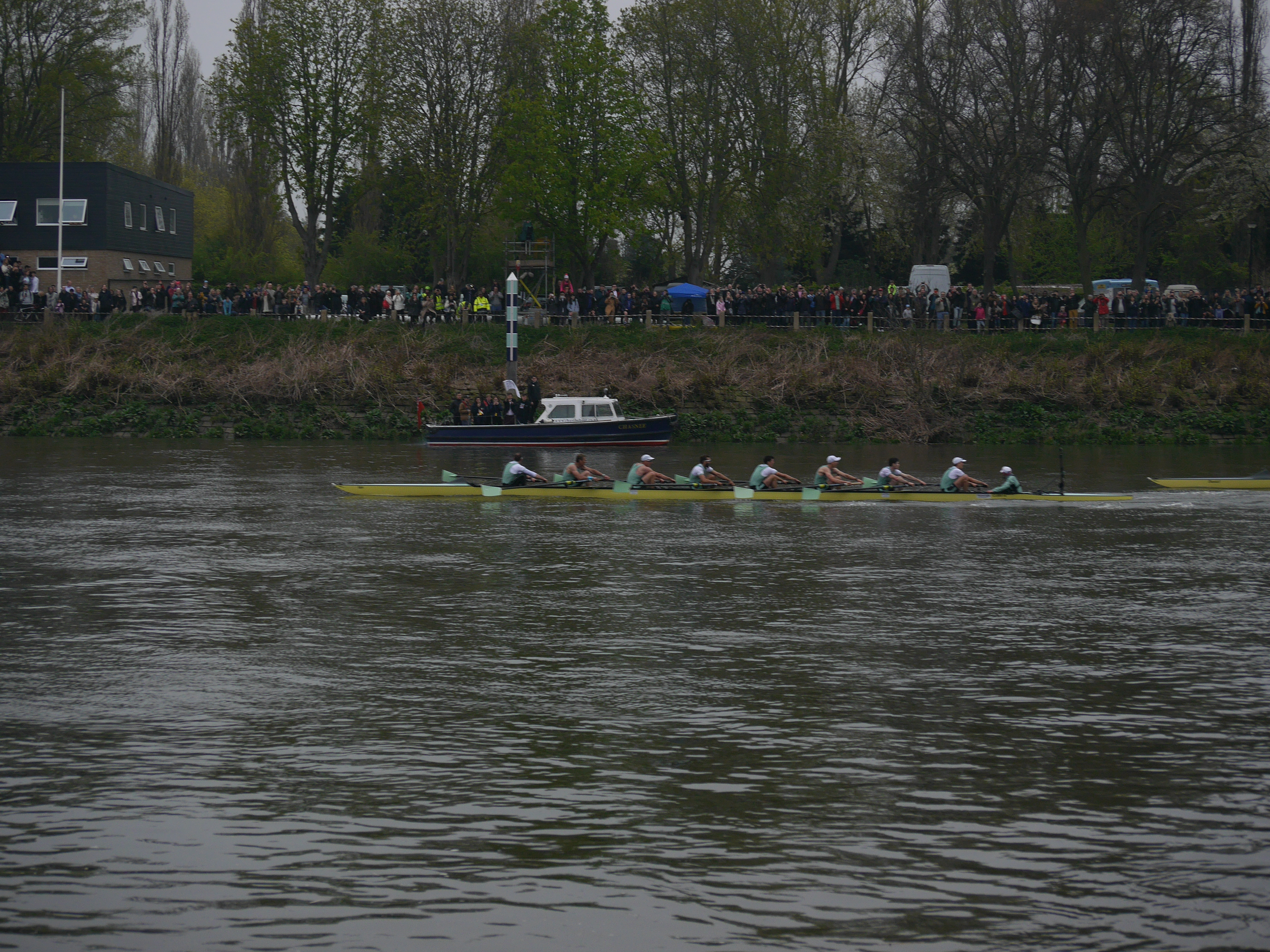
Cambridge women (left) and men, winning their respective races

CUWBC won the toss and elected to start from the Surrey side of the river, handing the Middlesex side to Oxford. Weather conditions for the race, which started at 2:14 p.m. Greenwich Mean Time (GMT), were 11 °C (52 °F), overcast but calm. The Light Blues took an early lead and by Craven Cottage were a length ahead. They continued to extend their advantage, and eventually passed the finishing post in a time of 18 minutes 47 seconds, five lengths ahead of their opponents. It was Cambridge's third consecutive victory but only their fourth win in twelve years, and took the overall record in the event to 44–30 in their favour.

=== Men's ===
CUBC won the toss and elected to start from the Surrey side of the river, leaving Oxford with the Middlesex side. The race started at 3:12 p.m. GMT and the Light Blues were quickly ahead, taking a half a length advantage within thirty seconds. Despite several warnings from the umpire, an oar clash followed but eventually CUBC steered wider to avoid further sanction. By Hammersmith Bridge, OUBC were four seconds behind, but began to recover some of the gap as the crews passed Chiswick Steps. The Light Blues maintained their lead and passed the finishing post in a time of 16 minutes 57 seconds, 28 seconds slower than the course record, but 2 seconds and 1 length ahead of their opponents. The Oxford cox raised a protest, but it was declined. It was Cambridge's third victory in the last four years, and took the overall record in the event to 84–80 in their favour.

== Reaction ==
After the victory, Cracknell's former Olympic team-mate Matthew Pinsent described his colleague's achievement as "off the scale".

CUWBC stroke Lily Lindsay said that despite having featured in international rowing for the United States, rowing in the Boat Race was incomparable, and "training alongside my team-mates has been unbelievable. It's been a pleasure".
