= Richard Bate (rower) =

British rower

Personal information
- Nationality: British
- Born: 22 October 1938 (age 86); Calcutta, Bengal, British India

Sport
- Sport: Rowing

Richard Bate (born 22 October 1938) is a British rower. He competed in the men's eight event at the 1960 Summer Olympics. He also rowed in two editions of the Boat Race, in 1960 and 1961.
