= The Boat Race 1961 =

107th Boat Race
- Date: 1 April 1961
- Winner: Cambridge
- Margin of victory: 4 1/4 lengths
- Winning time: 19 minutes 22 seconds
- Overall record (Cambridge–Oxford): 58–48
- Umpire: G. D. Clapperton (Oxford)

The 107th Boat Race took place on 1 April 1961. Held annually, the Boat Race is a side-by-side rowing race between crews from the Universities of Oxford and Cambridge along the River Thames. The race which was delayed, the lead changed hands several times and an Oxford rower slumped and nearly fell out of the boat. It was won by Cambridge by 4 1/4 lengths in a time of 19 minutes 22 seconds.

== Background ==
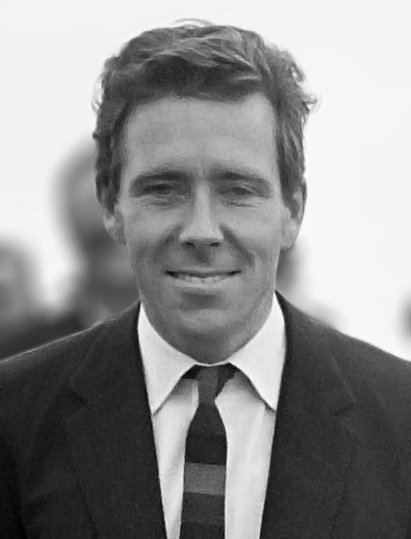
Antony Armstrong-Jones, 1st Earl of Snowdon (pictured in 1965) spectated from the umpire's boat.

The Boat Race is a side-by-side rowing competition between the University of Oxford (sometimes referred to as the "Dark Blues") and the University of Cambridge (sometimes referred to as the "Light Blues"). First held in 1829, the race takes place on the 4.2-mile (6.8 km) Championship Course on the River Thames in southwest London. The rivalry is a major point of honour between the two universities; it is followed throughout the United Kingdom and, as of 2014, broadcast worldwide. Oxford went into the race as reigning champions, having won the 1960 race by 1 1/4 lengths, while Cambridge led overall with 58 victories to Oxford's 47 (excluding the "dead heat" of 1877). Cambridge had not lost three consecutive races since the 1913 race.

Cambridge's coaches included J. R. F. Best, James Crowden (who rowed for the Light Blues in the 1951 and 1952 races), Derek Mays-Smith (who rowed in the 1955 and 1956 races), J. R. Owen (1959 and 1960 races) and J. J. Vernon (who rowed in the 1955 race). Oxford's coaching team comprised Jumbo Edwards (who rowed for Oxford in 1926 and 1930), J. L. Fage (an Oxford Blue in 1958 and 1959) and L. A. F. Stokes (who rowed for the Dark Blues in the 1951 and 1952 races). Oxford opted to row with 13-foot (4.0 m) long oars, 1 foot (0.3 m) longer than Cambridge's. Cambridge arrived at Putney with a reputation for speed over short distances and were regarded as "potentially dangerous challengers". Meanwhile, Oxford were anticipated to be "exceptionally strong" yet on occasion their rowing appeared to be "laborious", with some commentators blaming the longer oars.

The race was umpired by George Douglas "Jock" Clapperton who had coxed Oxford in the 1923 and 1924 races as well as umpiring in the 1959 boat race. He was accompanied in the umpire's boat by Antony Armstrong-Jones, husband of Princess Margaret, who had coxed Cambridge to victory in the 1950 race.

== Crews ==
The Oxford crew weighed an average of 12 st 12 lb (81.4 kg), 1 pound (0.5 kg) per rower more than their opponents. Cambridge's crew contained two former Blues, cox Roger Weston and rower John Beveridge who was making his third appearance in the event. Oxford saw five members of the previous year's race return. There were three non-British participants registered in the race: Oxford's number three, John Sewell and Cambridge's Mike Christian and Mark Hoffman were all from the United States. The latter pair had both captained the boat club at Harvard University.

Seat	Oxford			Cambridge		
Seat	Name	College	Weight	Name	College	Weight
Bow	R. C. I. Bate	St Edmund Hall	12 st 5 lb	R. G. Nicholson	St Catharine's	12 st 0 lb
2	C. P. M. Gomm	Balliol	12 st 12 lb	J. E. Gobbett	St Catharine's	12 st 7 lb
3	J. O. B. Sewall	Brasenose	13 st 4 lb	R. J. Fraser	Jesus	13 st 7 lb
4	I. L. Elliott (P)	Keble	13 st 5 lb	A. J. Collier	Lady Margaret Boat Club	13 st 0 lb
5	J. C. D. Sherratt	St Edmund Hall	12 st 12 lb	D. W. G. Calder	St Catharine's	12 st 13 lb
6	G. V. Cooper	Keble	13 st 0 lb	J. Beveridge (P)	Jesus	13 st 5 lb
7	J. R. Chester	Keble	12 st 8 lb	M. W. Christian	1st & 3rd Trinity	12 st 8 lb
Stroke	C. M. Davis	Lincoln	12 st 7 lb	M. Hoffman	1st & 3rd Trinity	12 st 5 lb
Cox	P. J. Reynolds	St Edmund Hall	8 st 4 lb	R. T. Weston	Selwyn	8 st 12 lb
Source: (P) – boat club president

== Race ==
The Championship Course along which the Boat Race is contested

Oxford, the pre-race favourites, won the toss and elected to start from the Surrey station, handing the Middlesex side of the river to Cambridge. The race commenced at 2.35 p.m., delayed by more than 20 minutes as a result of a drifting stake boat, with Cambridge taking an early but brief lead. After the first minute, Oxford led by a few feet and increased their advantage to half a length by Craven Steps. At Craven Cottage, Cambridge spurted and retook the lead, but Oxford counterattacked and edged ahead. With the advantage of the bend in the river, Cambridge drew level by the Mile Post. The Dark Blues once again took the lead, and by Hammersmith Bridge were four seconds ahead and held a clear water advantage. Rowing into a headwind, Oxford began to lose their shape and by Chiswick Eyot, Cambridge had reduced the deficit enough to overlap the Dark Blue boat, although Oxford still led by a length at Chiswick Steps.

Twelve minutes into the race, the Oxford number six, Graham Cooper, "turned pale and slumped", disrupting the Oxford rhythm. Although he appeared to recover, "the cohesion had gone". Cambridge overtook the Dark Blue boat and were three lengths ahead by Barnes Bridge, and passed the finishing post with a four-and-a-half length advantage in a time of 19 minutes 22 seconds, the slowest since the 1954 race. It was Cambridge's first victory in three years and their largest winning margin since the 1955 race.

The rowing correspondent for The Times suggested that "for Oxford it was a sad day, and for Cooper a tragedy", while for Cambridge it was "a splendid victory". Cambridge's stroke Hoffman said "it was a tough race ... but when I saw that one of the Oxford crew was in distress, I knew we could not help winning." It was the third time since the war that Oxford had lost the event as a result of a crew member collapsing mid-race. Oxford's bow Richard Bate confessed that he "didn't even know anything had been wrong until after the race. I only knew we were not at our best."
