= Samuel Hookway =

Australian rower

Personal information
- Born: 22 January 1991 (age 35)

Sport
- Country: Australia
- Sport: Rowing
- Club: Melbourne Uni Boat Club
Medal record
Men's rowing
Representing Australia
World Rowing Championships
World Rowing U23 Championships
Bronze medal – third place	2012 Trakai	BM8+

Dr. Samuel Hookway (born 22 January 1991) is an Australian former representative rower and a medical registrar working in the field of orthopaedics. As a rower he was a national champion and won a bronze medal at the 2012 U23 World Rowing Championships.

== Club, state & varsity rowing ==
Hookway was raised in Tasmania and attended the Hutchins School where he took up rowing. His senior club rowing was from the Melbourne University Boat Club.

Hookway made his representative debut for his home state of Tasmania at the 2010 Interstate Regatta within the Australian Rowing Championships contesting the Noel Wilkinson Trophy in the men's youth eight. Having relocated to Melbourne for his tertiary studies in 2011 he was selected to the Victorian youth eight and in that crew he won the Noel Wilkinson Trophy in 2011. In 2012 he moved into the Victorian senior men's eight and contested the King's Cup at the Australian Interstate Regatta in 2012, in 2014 and 2016, finally enjoying a Victorian win in that event in 2016.

In MUBC colours he achieved podium finishes at numerous events at Australian Rowing Championships - gold in the U23 8+ and U23 4- in 2011; bronze in the U23 4- in 2012; bronze in the men's 2- in 2014 and bronze in the men's 4- in 2016. He raced at Australian University Championships for MUBC winning the national intervarsity title in the men's 8+ in 2011 and achieving a second placing in that same event in 2012.

Whilst at Cambridge University undertaking post-graduate studies Hookway rowed in the Cambridge senior men's eight which won the 2019 Boat Race.

== International representative rowing ==
Hookway made his Australian representative debut at the 2012 World Rowing U23 Championships in Trakai. He stroked the Australian men's U23 eight to a bronze medal win. That crew included a number of future Australian Olympians and world champions including Spencer Turrin, Alexander Hill, Alexander Lloyd and Angus Moore and David Watts.

In early 2014 World Rowing Cup I was held in Sydney and Hookway was elevated to the Australian senior squad. All the Australian sweep oarsmen contested the coxless four event across four boats and Hookway's crew finished fifth in the final. Also at that regatta he raced in the 2nd Australian eight which finished fourth.

Hookway secured a seat in the Australian men's eight for the 2015 European racing season. He rowed in the three seat when they finished fifth at the WRC III and then rowed at five at the 2015 World Rowing Championships when the Australian eight finished in overall ninth place. It was his last Australian representative appearance.

== Rowing family ==
Sam Hookway is the younger brother of Jonothan Hookway an Australian lightweight representative rower who won a Junior World Championship in 2006. Their father Russell Hookway was an Australian champion lightweight rower who made national representation at the 1984 World Rowing Championships.

== Professional career ==
Hookway first studied biomedical science at the University of Melbourne. He graduated with a medical degree from Monash University in 2018. He undertook post-graduate studies in surgery at Cambridge University in 2018 & 2019. He has published papers in the field of orthopaedics and since 2022 has been an Orthopaedic Registrar with Barwon Health in Victoria.
