= The Boat Race 1996 =

142nd Boat Race
- Date: 6 April 1996
- Winner: Cambridge
- Margin of victory: 2 3/4 lengths
- Winning time: 16 minutes 58 seconds
- Overall record (Cambridge–Oxford): 73–68
- Umpire: Mike Sweeney (Cambridge)

Other races
- Reserve winner: Goldie
- Women's winner: Cambridge

The 142nd Boat Race took place on 6 April 1996. Held annually, the Boat Race is a side-by-side rowing race between crews from the Universities of Oxford and Cambridge along the River Thames. Umpired by a former Blue, Mike Sweeney, Cambridge won by 2 3/4 lengths in the second-fastest time in the history of the race.

In the reserve race, Cambridge's Goldie defeated Oxford's Isis in a record time, while Cambridge won the Women's Boat Race.

== Background ==
The Boat Race is a side-by-side rowing competition between the University of Oxford (sometimes referred to as the "Dark Blues") and the University of Cambridge (sometimes referred to as the "Light Blues"). First held in 1829, the race takes place on the 4.2-mile (6.8 km) Championship Course on the River Thames in southwest London. The rivalry is a major point of honour between the two universities and followed throughout the United Kingdom and broadcast worldwide. Cambridge went into the race as reigning champions, having won the 1995 race by four lengths, with Cambridge leading overall with 72 victories to Oxford's 68 (excluding the "dead heat" of 1877).

The first Women's Boat Race took place in 1927, but did not become an annual fixture until the 1960s. Up until 2014, the contest was conducted as part of the Henley Boat Races, but as of the 2015 race, it is held on the River Thames, on the same day as the men's main and reserve races. The reserve race, contested between Oxford's Isis boat and Cambridge's Goldie boat has been held since 1965. It usually takes place on the Tideway, prior to the main Boat Race.

The previous year's race was watched by seven million viewers in the United Kingdom alone. Oxford coach Dan Topolski suggested that part of the appeal was that the contest was "absolutely amateur" but still "represents quality". Former Oxford Blue and Olympic gold medallist Jonny Searle agreed, calling the Boat Race "a unique experience". Both Topolski and Searle predicted a close race; Cambridge coach Robin Williams agreed: "We've got to accord Oxford some respect. I think we're again the better crew ... but the only way to find out is on the water." Penny Chuter, one of the other Oxford coaches, noted "Cambridge have a continuity ... but we have more power this year." Cambridge's boat club president John Carver had earlier withdrawn from the race with injury. Oxford's director of rowing, Steve Royle, said of his crew: "these guys love a scrap."

The 250 officers from Wandsworth Police lining the embankments were able to replace their traditional helmets for peaked caps for the first time, in order to discourage members of the crowd from removing them and throwing them into the river. The race was sponsored for the tenth consecutive year by Beefeater Gin, and umpired by former Cambridge Blue Mike Sweeney.

== Crews ==
The Oxford crew weighed an average of 1.25 pounds (0.57 kg) more per rower than their opponents. Each crew saw just one former Blue return, Clegg for Oxford and Barnett for Cambridge, in addition to Barnett, Cambridge's crew contained five former Goldie rowers. Oxford's crew contained more international rowers with four Americans and a Canadian.

Seat	Oxford			Cambridge		
Seat	Name	College	Weight	Name	College	Weight
Bow	Ed J Bellamy	Keble	13 st 3 lb	Julian R Elliott	Trinity	13 st 7.5 lb
2	D Robert H Clegg	Keble	13 st 12 lb	Miles P C Barnett	Queens'	14 st 1 lb
3	John F Hammond	New College	13 st 5.5 lb	Nick J Burfitt	Emmanuel	13 st 8.5 lb
4	Damien R West	St Catherine's	13 st 3 lb	Sebastian J Dawson-Bowling	Magdalene	14 st 12 lb
5	Benjamin Mann	Keble	15 st 0.5 lb	Ethan Ayer	St Edmund's	15 st 6 lb
6	Jeremy W Howick	Keble	13 st 4 lb	Henry G C Clarke	Trinity Hall	13 st 11 lb
7	Paul A Berger	University	14 st 13.5 lb	Rob M Waller	Downing	13 st 1 lb
Stroke	Adam R A Frost	Oriel	14 st 2.5 lb	James F E Ball	Robinson	13 st 3 lb
Cox	Todd B Kristol	Oriel	7 st 7.5 lb	Kevin Whyman	Peterhouse	8 st 0.5 lb

== Race ==
The Championship Course along which the Boat Race is contested

Cambridge started as pre-race favourites. They won the toss and elected to start from the Surrey station. After a close start, where neither boat took a significant lead, Cambridge were a half a length up at the Mile Post. They pushed on at Harrods Furniture Depository to take two thirds of a length lead over Oxford by Hammersmith Bridge. Under pressure from the Dark Blues, Whyman steered his crew to record times between the Mile Post and Barnes Bridge, Hammersmith Bridge to Barnes Bridge, Chiswick Steps to Barnes Bridge and Chiswick Steps to the finishing post. Cambridge won by 2 3/4 lengths in a time of 16 minutes 58 seconds, the second-fastest time on record (thirteen seconds slower than the winning time in the 1984 race).

In the reserve race, Cambridge's Goldie won by eleven lengths, in a record time, over Isis. It was Cambridge's ninth victory in ten years. Cambridge won the 51st Women's Boat Race by four lengths in a time of 6 minutes and 12 seconds, their seventh victory in eight years.

== Reaction ==
During the race, David Miller of The Times claimed that Cambridge's stroke James Ball "conducted a continual tactical conversation with Kevin Whyman, the Cambridge cox". Miller suggested that while Oxford were the more powerful crew, Cambridge were technically superior.

Oxford coach Chuter concluded: "we did not find the cohesive and relaxed rhythm which we have had." Her counterpart, Williams, exclaimed "you have got to be happy with that".
