= The Boat Race 1960 =

106th Boat Race
- Date: 2 April 1960
- Winner: Oxford
- Margin of victory: 1 1/4 lengths
- Winning time: 18 minutes 59 seconds
- Overall record (Cambridge–Oxford): 58–47
- Umpire: Kenneth Payne (Cambridge)

The 106th The Boat Race took place on 2 April 1960. Held annually, the Boat Race is a side-by-side rowing race between crews from the Universities of Oxford and Cambridge along the River Thames. Oxford went into the race as reigning champions, having won the previous year's race. In a race umpired by former Cambridge rower Kenneth Payne and attended by Princess Margaret, Countess of Snowdon, it was won by Oxford by 1 1/4 lengths in a time of 18 minutes 59 seconds, their second consecutive victory, which took the overall record in the event to 58–47 in Cambridge's favour.

== Background ==
The Boat Race is a side-by-side rowing competition between the University of Oxford (sometimes referred to as the "Dark Blues") and the University of Cambridge (sometimes referred to as the "Light Blues"). First held in 1829, the race takes place on the 4.2-mile (6.8 km) Championship Course on the River Thames in southwest London. The rivalry is a major point of honour between the two universities; it is followed throughout the United Kingdom and, as of 2014, broadcast worldwide. Oxford went into the race as reigning champions, having won the 1959 race by six lengths, while Cambridge led overall with 58 victories to Oxford's 46 (excluding the "dead heat" of 1877).

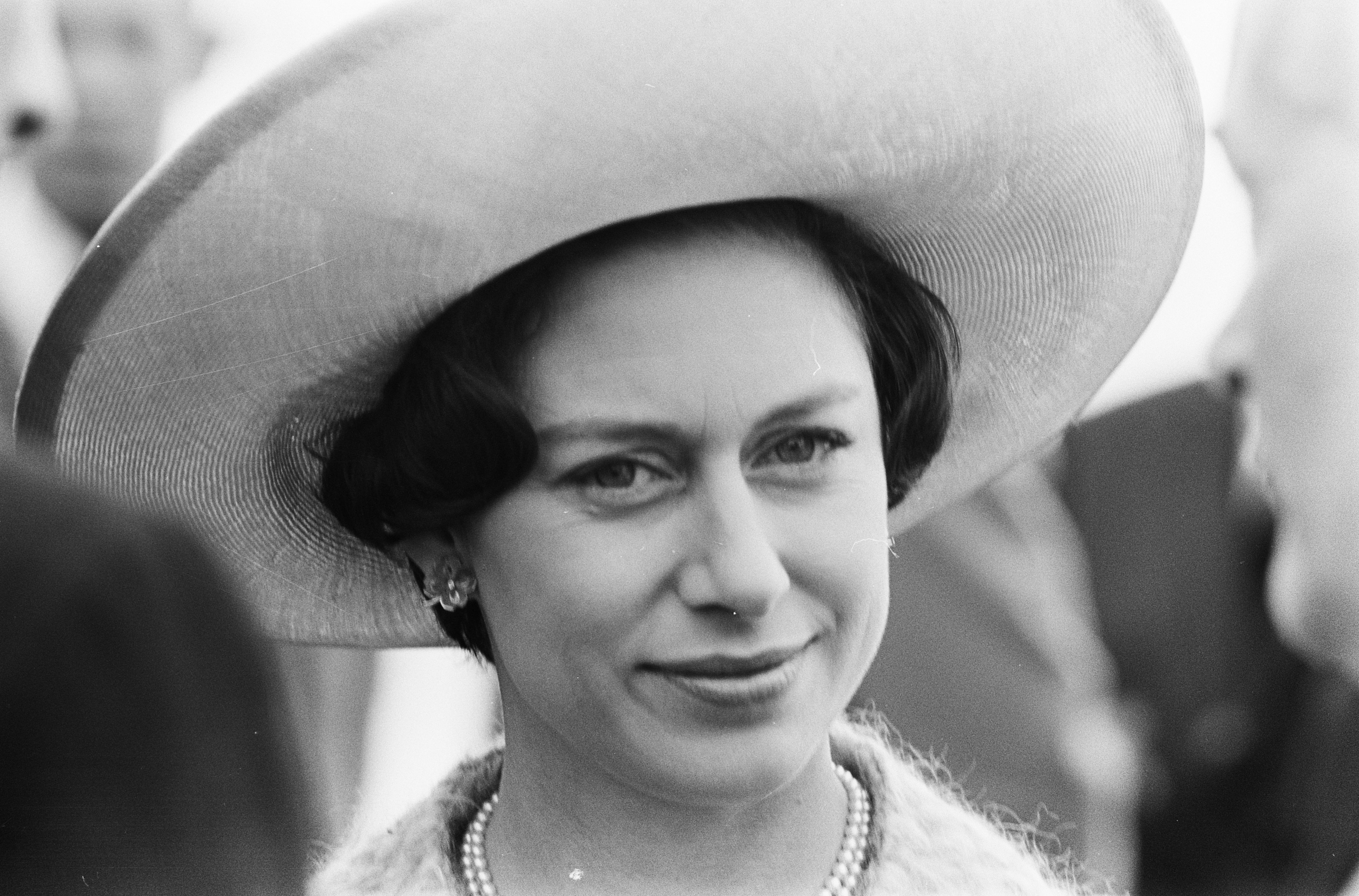
Princess Margaret, Countess of Snowdon (pictured in 1965) was the first member of the British royal family to attend the Boat Race in forty years.

Cambridge were coached by Chris Addison (who rowed for Cambridge in the 1939 race), James Crowden (who rowed for the Light Blues in the 1951 and 1952 races), A. T. Denby (1958 Blue), David Jennens (who rowed three times between 1949 and 1951) and J. R. Owen (1959 race). Oxford's coaching team comprised Hugh "Jumbo" Edwards (who rowed for Oxford in 1926 and 1930), J. L. Fage (an Oxford Blue in 1958 and 1959) and L. A. F. Stokes (who rowed for the Dark Blues in the 1951 and 1952 races). The Oxford crew had opted to use 7.5-pound (3.4 kg) oars, 2 pounds (0.9 kg) lighter than normal.

The main race was umpired for the seventh and penultimate time by the former British Olympian Kenneth Payne who had rowed for Cambridge in the 1932 and 1934 races. Antony Armstrong-Jones, who had coxed Cambridge to victory in the 1950 race, and his fiancée Princess Margaret were spectators on board the Cambridge launch Amaryllis.

== Crews ==
Both crews weighed an average of 12 st 9 lb (80.1 kg). Cambridge's crew contained three rowers who had taken part in the 1959 race, bow J. R. Owen, G. H. Brown and John Beveridge. Oxford saw two rowers return from the previous year's race, Alexander Lindsay and D. C. Rutherford. Former Olympic gold medallist Jack Beresford, writing in The Observer said the Dark Blues "are good watermen: their co-ordination is precise, their boat control admirable". Beresford suggested that the Cambridge crew were "not fully under control ... there is a definite jerkiness and hurry about their work."

Only one participant in this year's race was registered as non-British in American Townsend Swayze, the former Harvard University captain.

Seat	Oxford			Cambridge		
Seat	Name	College	Weight	Name	College	Weight
Bow	R. C. I. Bate	St Edmund Hall	12 st 5 lb	J. R. Owen	St John's	11 st 8 lb
2	R. L. S. Fishlock	St Edmund Hall	12 st 0 lb	S. R. M. Price	Trinity	12 st 0 lb
3	T. S. Swayze	Wadham	13 st 2 lb	F. P. T. Wiggins	St John's	12 st 12.5 lb
4	A. T. Lindsay	Magdalen	12 st 10 lb	J. Parker	St John's	12 st 8 lb
5	I. L. Elliott	Keble	13 st 8 lb	G. H. Brown (P)	Trinity Hall	13 st 11.5 lb
6	D. C. Rutherford (P)	Magdalen	12 st 12 lb	J. Beveridge	Jesus	13 st 2 lb
7	J. R. Chester	Keble	12 st 5 lb	E. T. C. Johnstone	St John's	12 st 12 lb
Stroke	C. M. Davis	Lincoln	12 st 6 lb	P. W. Holmes	St John's	12 st 5 lb
Cox	P. J. Reynolds	St Edmund Hall	9 st 1 lb	R. T. Weston	Selwyn	9 st 1 lb
Source: (P) – boat club president

== Race ==
The Championship Course along which the Boat Race is contested

Oxford won the toss and elected to start from the Middlesex station, handing the Surrey side of the river to Cambridge. The Dark Blues made the quicker start and held a canvas-length lead after ten strokes, extending to half a length after the first minute. With the bend of the river in their favour, Oxford pulled further ahead and were three-quarters of a length up by Craven Cottage. Passing the Mile Post in a record time (beating that set in the 1934), Oxford spurted at Harrods Furniture Depository to hold held a clear water advantage, and were two lengths ahead by the time the crews passed below Hammersmith Bridge.

As the Oxford cox, P. J. Reynolds steered the Dark Blues towards the Middlesex shore, allowing Cambridge to start to reduce the deficit. Difficult conditions between Chiswick and Barnes Bridge slowed the pace of the race, but a spurt just before Barnes allowed Cambridge to close the gap to four seconds. Aggressive steering from Cambridge's Roger Weston was held off by Oxford who took advantage of the tide, and in a sprint finish, Oxford won by 1 1/4 lengths in a time of 18 minutes 59 seconds. It was Oxford's second consecutive victory for just the second time since the First World War. It was also the first time since the 1921 race that the event was witnessed by a member of the British royal family.

Ian Thomson, writing in The Observer, described the event as "a really titanic struggle ... an exceptionally gallant race." The rowing correspondent for The Guardian stated that the race saw "one of the most gallant finishing efforts by a crew two lengths in arrears at the half-way mark."
