= Kevin Whyman =

English rower and air pilot

- Born: 4 October 1975; Chester, Cheshire
- Died: 1 August 2015 (aged 39); Oulton Park, Cheshire
- Cause of death: Aviation accident
- Education: The King's School, Chester
- Occupations: Rower & aviator
- Years active: 1997–2015

Kevin Whyman (4 October 1975 – 1 August 2015) was an English rower and air pilot. Whyman died in an aviation accident at the 2015 CarFest.

Whyman rowed for the King's School Rowing Club. In 1996 and 1997, he was the cox for The Boat Race-winning Cambridge team.

Whyman was a Royal Air Force trained pilot and a member of the Gnat Display Team.

== Death ==
On 1 August 2015, Whyman died in an aviation accident when the display aircraft he was piloting crashed during a synchro exercise at the CarFest North event at Oulton Park in Cheshire. Whyman was performing with the Gnat Display Team at the time of his death.
