= University rowing in the United Kingdom =

University rowing in the United Kingdom is widespread, with competitions organised by British Universities and Colleges Sport (BUCS) and between and within universities in the United Kingdom.

== History ==
University rowing in the United Kingdom began when it was introduced at Oxford University in the late 18th century. The first known race at a university took place at Oxford in 1815 between Brasenose and Jesus colleges. The first inter-university boat race, between Oxford and Cambridge, was rowed on 10 June 1829. In Scotland, the rowing clubs of Glasgow University and Edinburgh University initiated an annual race in 1877, the second oldest university rowing competition in the United Kingdom. Competitive university rowing in Northern Ireland began in the 1930s with the formation of Queen's University Belfast Boat Club in 1931, whose first inter-varsity races were a triangular tournament against Glasgow University and University College Dublin in 1934–35 and who entered the Wylie Cup (which had been running between Irish universities since 1922) from 1937 to 1938. The Welsh Boat Race began in 2006.

Many universities in the United Kingdom have a rowing club and at some collegiate universities, that is, Oxford, Cambridge, Durham, and London, each college has its own club as well as a main university club. In contrast to the Oxford, Cambridge, and Durham colleges, London colleges are members of British Universities and Colleges Sport in their own right, and thus compete in inter-university competitions.

On 16 June 2008, UCS (who represented the professional staff working in the sector) and BUSA (the body for competitive sport in the sector) merged to form "BUCS" – British Universities and Colleges Sport. Events from 2008/09 onwards were held under the BUCS banner, rather than BUSA, e.g. BUCS Regatta rather than BUSA regatta.

A 2016 article identified six university clubs which "dominate rowing among higher education institutions": Oxford Brookes, Imperial College, London, Newcastle, Durham and Reading. With the exception of Reading, these are all designated by British Rowing as High Performance Programmes, a scheme that also involves Edinburgh as well as three non-university clubs. In more recent times Bristol has placed itself amongst the UK's leading programmes. In the UK the 'Championship' Programmes are: Brookes, Bristol, Durham, Edinburgh, Imperial, Newcastle and UL (London).

== BUCS ==
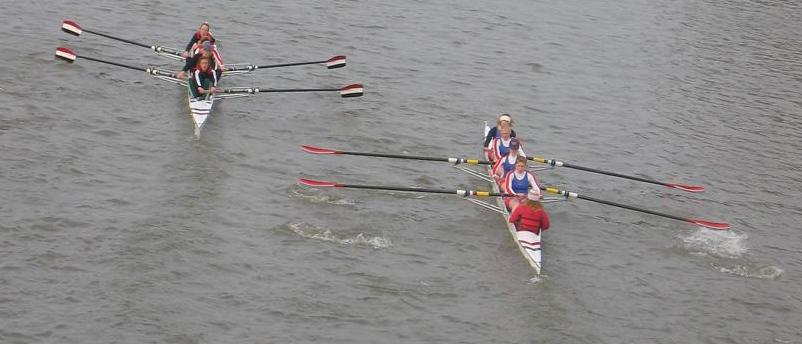
Crews can get very close to each other when overtaking at BUCS Head

Most universities compete in the British Universities and Colleges Sport (BUCS) Championships with a number of events over the year. For non-indoor events, boats are separated into Championship (where "BUCS points" are available), Intermediate and Beginner (for students in their first year of the sport).

BUCS events contribute "BUCS Points" (for Championship boats) towards the (multi-sport) BUCS championship. Since 2011–12, a breakdown of points by sport has also been available. The highest ranked universities in rowing since then have been:

Year	First	Second	Third
2018–19	Edinburgh (312)	Newcastle (284)	Queen's Belfast (121)
2017–18	Edinburgh (315)	Newcastle (305)	London (250)
2016–17	London (282)	Edinburgh (267)	Oxford Brookes (197)
2015–16	Newcastle (280)	Edinburgh (218)	Reading (185)
2014–15	Durham (269)	Edinburgh (249)	Newcastle (245)
2013–14	Imperial (256)	London (157)	Durham (155)
2012–13	Imperial (400)	Durham (359)	Newcastle (291)
2011–12	Durham (356)	Newcastle (309)	Reading (301)

=== BUCS Small Boats Head ===
The Small Boats Head was held in October. The event was introduced in 2006 and first held on the Trent in Nottingham, small boats having previously competed in the BUSA Championship Head. The 2007 event, held in December, saw 4s included in the Small Boats Head and Durham compete for the first time, dominating the medal table. In 2008 the event was again held in October but moved to the Witham in Boston, Lincolnshire, where it ran in conjunction with the GB Rowing Team 1st Senior/U23 Assessment. The 2012 head saw Durham's dominance finally broken as, with only the double sculls racing, Imperial topped the medal table with a single gold, a silver and a bronze. Imperial won again the following year, with only the single sculls racing.

Note that as the Small Boats Head was an autumn event, the BUCS 4s and 8s Head and Regatta from the same BUCS season (academic year) were held on the following calendar year, e.g. the 2015 Small Boats Head is part of the 2015–16 BUCS season along with the 2016 4s and 8s Head and the 2016 Regatta.

Year	Top of the Medal Table	Number of medals
2018	Newcastle University Boat Club	9 (6 gold, 2 silver, 1 bronze)
2017	Edinburgh University Boat Club	7 (5 gold, 1 silver, 1 bronze)
2016	Cambridge University Boat Club	6 (3 gold, 2 silver, 1 bronze)
2015	Reading University Boat Club	3 (2 gold, 1 bronze)
2014	Reading University Boat Club	3 (2 gold, 1 silver)
2013	Imperial College Boat Club	3 (2 gold, 1 bronze)
2012	Imperial College Boat Club	3 (1 gold, 1 silver, 1 bronze)
2011	Durham University Boat Club	4 (2 gold, 1 silver, 1 bronze)
2010	Durham University Boat Club	6 (4 gold, 2 bronze)
2009	Durham University Boat Club	10 (3 gold, 2 silver, 5 bronze)
2008	Durham University Boat Club	9 (5 gold, 2 silver, 2 bronze)
2007	Durham University Boat Club	12 (8 gold, 3 silver, 1 bronze)
2006

=== BUCS Indoor Rowing Series (UIRS) ===
BUCS Rowing and British Rowing have managed an annual autumn indoor rowing series at a number of universities and other centres across the UK since 2010, when it started with 11 centres and ran from late November to mid December. In 2016, thirteen centres hosted events from late October to the end of November.

=== BUCS Head ===
This is a 5 kilometres (3.1 mi) head race which has been run in February or March since 2003 (originally as the BUSA Championship Head). The event grew rapidly, becoming the largest university heads race in the world by 2007, despite the small boats being split into a separate head (see above) after the 2006 event. It was held on the River Trent in Nottingham until 2009, when the decision was made to move the event to the River Nene in Peterborough, and to split the competition into 2 separate days, with Beginners racing over a shorter 3 kilometres (1.9 mi) course on one day, and Seniors racing on the longer course on the other. However, due to inclement weather, the event was cancelled. The event was again held in Peterborough in 2010, 2011 and 2012, and was due to be held there in 2013. However, due to flooding, the event was moved to Boston that year, with Newcastle topping the medal table.

The 2014 event was cancelled due to bad weather, It was held in Boston again in 2015, with racing on Saturday only for the intermediate and championship crews. Newcastle topped the medal table and won the men's Victor Ludorum while Durham, who were second in the medal table, took the women's Victor Ludorum and the overall Victor Ludorum.

In 2015, BUCS sought a new host for a three-year period (2016–2018). The event subsequently moved to the Tyne, hosted by Tyne United Rowing Club, Tyne Amateur Rowing Club and Newcastle University Boat Club in 2016. Newcastle won both the overall and men's Victor Ludorum, with Edinburgh winning the women's Victor Ludorum. The first day of the 2017 event, also on the Tyne, had to be cancelled due to poor weather, but the second day (for senior crews) went ahead, with London topping the medal table and taking the Victor Ludorum. The 2018 event saw separate men's and women's Victor Ludorum awards, with London taking the women's prize and Newcastle taking the men's. From 2019, the event was to be held for three years on the Gloucester and Sharpness Canal, hosted by the University of Bristol, Hartpury University Centre and Gloucester Rowing Club. Newcastle took the Men's and Overall Victor Ludorum in 2019, with Edinburgh taking the Women's. However, it reverted to the Tyne in 2020 after only one year. The 2020 event was shortened due to bad weather, with only the intermediate and championship races taking place. Newcastle University topped the medal table with ten medals, four gold, as well as winning the men's, women's and overall Victor Ludorum. The 2021 event was cancelled due to COVID, but it returned to the Tyne for 2022 and 2023. Newcastle took the overall and men's Victor Ludorum in 2022, with Durham taking the women's. In 2023, Durham achieved a clean sweep with the women's, men's and overall Victor Ludorum. In 2026, the small boats returned to the main BUCS Head event.

Year	VL Overall	VL Women	VL Open/Men
2026	Durham University Boat Club	Edinburgh University Boat Club	Durham University Boat Club
2025	Newcastle University Boat Club	Newcastle University Boat Club	Durham University Boat Club
2024	Newcastle University Boat Club	Durham University Boat Club	Newcastle University Boat Club
2023	Durham University Boat Club	Durham University Boat Club	Durham University Boat Club
2022	Newcastle University Boat Club	Durham University Boat Club	Newcastle University Boat Club
2021	No race held		
2020	Newcastle University Boat Club	Newcastle University Boat Club	Newcastle University Boat Club
2019	Newcastle University Boat Club	Edinburgh University Boat Club	Newcastle University Boat Club
2018	N/A	Newcastle University Boat Club	University of London Boat Club
Year	Top of Medal Table	Number of Medals	Victor Ludorum
2017	University of London Boat Club	12 (4 gold, 5 silver, 3 bronze)	University of London Boat Club
2016	Newcastle University Boat Club	16 (6 gold, 5 silver, 5 bronze)	Newcastle University Boat Club
2015	Newcastle University Boat Club	12 (6 gold, 3 silver, 3 bronze)	Durham University Boat Club
2014	No race held		
2013	Newcastle University Boat Club	10 (5 gold, 4 silver, 1 bronze)	
2012	Durham University Boat Club	15 (5 gold, 4 silver, 6 bronze)	
2011	Durham University Boat Club	13 (7 gold, 4 silver, 2 bronze)	
2010	Durham University Boat Club	10 (4 gold, 4 silver, 2 bronze)	
2009	No race held		
2008	Durham University Boat Club	14 (10 gold, 2 silver, 2 bronze)	
2007	Oxford Brookes University Boat Club	5 (4 gold, 1 silver)	
2006			Imperial College Boat Club
2005
2004
2003

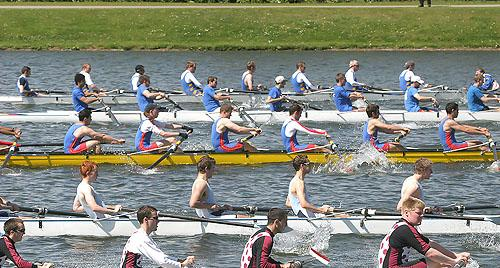
The start of a race at BUCS Regatta

=== BUCS Regatta ===
A 2 km regatta held (usually at Holme Pierrepont) over the May Day weekend. Points for the Victor Ludorum are awarded for finishing places in the finals (more points for champ events and bigger boats).

The regatta was first run (as the BUSA regatta) in 1994, replacing the UAU 'Regatta' that had been a two-hour slot for University races in the Nottingham City Regatta. The first Regatta attracted 105 crews; by 2000 this had grown to 354. The 2001 Regatta was the first to be held over two days, and attracted over 500 crews. In 2006 the Regatta grew to three days with almost 1000 crews taking part.

In its early years the Regatta was dominated by Nottingham, but in 2004 it was won for the first time by Durham. In 2005 Durham were 1st again, followed by Reading University in 2nd place and University of London behind them in 3rd place. Durham's dominance continued until 2014, when London took the trophy, with Durham 2nd and Imperial College 3rd.

2014 also saw the introduction of separate Victor Ludorum trophies for men's and women's teams in addition to the overall trophy: Durham took the women's prize and Imperial the men's. 2015 saw Durham retain the women's title and Newcastle the men's, with Durham taking the overall title. Newcastle's men retained their trophy in 2016 and Newcastle University won the overall trophy for the first time. The University of London won the 2016 women's trophy on gold medal count, having finished equal on points with Exeter.

In 2008 the BUSA regatta was held at Strathclyde Country Park, as NWSC was not available that weekend. Two weeks earlier, a BUSA Sprint Regatta was held at Cotswold Water Park, though the regatta had to be held as a time trial because the weather had prevented the course and stakeboats being laid.

Results

Year	Overall Victor Ludorum	Men's	Women's
2026	Reading University Boat Club	Reading University Boat Club	Reading University Boat Club
2025	Newcastle University Boat Club	Reading University Boat Club	Newcastle University Boat Club
2024	Oxford Brookes University Boat Club	Oxford Brookes University Boat Club	Durham University Boat Club
2023	Durham University Boat Club	Oxford Brookes University Boat Club	Durham University Boat Club
2022	Edinburgh University Boat Club	Edinburgh University Boat Club	Cambridge University Boat Club
2021	Oxford Brookes University Boat Club	Oxford Brookes University Boat Club	Cambridge University Boat Club
2019	Newcastle University Boat Club	Newcastle University Boat Club	Edinburgh University Boat Club
2018	Newcastle University Boat Club	Newcastle University Boat Club	Newcastle University Boat Club/Oxford Brookes University Boat Club (tie)
2017	Oxford Brookes University Boat Club	Oxford Brookes University Boat Club	University of London Boat Club
2016	Newcastle University Boat Club	Newcastle University Boat Club	University of London Boat Club
2015	Durham University Boat Club	Newcastle University Boat Club	Durham University Boat Club
2014	University of London Boat Club	Imperial College Boat Club	Durham University Boat Club
2013	Durham University Boat Club		
2012	Durham University Boat Club		
2011	Durham University Boat Club		
2010	Durham University Boat Club		
2009	Durham University Boat Club		
2008	Durham University Boat Club		
2007	Durham University Boat Club		
2006	Durham University Boat Club		
2005	Durham University Boat Club		
2004	Durham University Boat Club		
2003	Nottingham University Boat Club		
2002	Nottingham University Boat Club		
2001	Nottingham University Boat Club		
2000	Nottingham University Boat Club		
1999	Oxford Brookes University Boat Club		
1998	?		
1997	Nottingham University Boat Club		
1996	Nottingham University Boat Club		
1995	Nottingham University Boat Club		
1994	Nottingham University Boat Club		

== Other competitions ==
=== Head of the River Race ===
The Head of the River Race for men's eights, rowed on the Championship Course on the Tideway, awarded the Ortner Shield (named after Reading University coach Frank Ortner) to the fastest University Athletics Union (UAU) crew (later BUSA crew) from 1961 to 2005. The first winners were Reading, but the shield was dominated by Durham from the mid-1960s to the mid-1980s, who also won the final shield in 2005.

In 2006 the "University Prize" replaced the Ortner Shield. This was restricted to university and college crews of Senior 2 (now Intermediate 1) status or lower, with no higher-status entries from that institute, affiliated to British Rowing, Scottish Rowing or Welsh Rowing. This was later renamed the Halladay Trophy, after Durham coach Eric Halladay, and joined by the Bernard Churcher Trophy, an unrestricted prize for universities from anywhere in the world – boats may only be entered for one of these trophies, even if eligible for both. The Halladay Trophy was last awarded in 2016 with an academic beginner trophy awarded from 2018 and small and medium academic pennants awarded from 2019.

Year	Bernard Churcher Trophy	Aitken Academic Beginner Trophy	Medium Academic Pennant	Small Academic Pennant
2025	Cambridge	Exeter	East Anglia	West of England
2024	Oxford Brookes	Exeter	Downing College, Cambridge	Trevelyan College, Durham
2023	Oxford Brookes	Exeter	York	St John's College, Durham
2022	Oxford Brookes	Liverpool	Surrey	Selwyn College, Cambridge
2019	Oxford Brookes	Surrey	St Andrew's	Brasenose College, Oxford
2018	Oxford Brookes	Edinburgh		

Year	Bernard Churcher Trophy	Halladay Trophy
2017	Race cancelled	
2016	Oxford Brookes	Durham
2015	Oxford Brookes	Durham
2014	Race abandoned	
2013	No race	
2012	Durham	London
2011	Imperial	Cambridge
2010	Oxford Brookes	Newcastle
2009	Oxford Brookes	First and Third Trinity, Cambridge
2008	Durham	Oxford Brookes
2007	Race abandoned	
2006	N/A	Newcastle

Ortner Shield winners
University	Wins	Years
Durham	20	1963, 1966–1976, 1978–1984, 2005
Imperial College	9	1987–1991, 1993, 1997, 1998, 2000
Oxford Brookes	7	1994–1996, 1999, 2001–2003
Reading	3	1961, 1985, 1986
Nottingham	3	1962, 1964, 1965
University College and Hospital (UCL)	1	1977
Bristol	1	1992

=== Women's Eights Head of the River Race ===
The Women's Eights Head of the River Race is, like the men's counterpart, raced on the Championship Course on the Tideway. University crews from anywhere in the world compete for the University Pennant; from 1999 to 2005 there was also a separate prize for the top BUSA-affiliated crew.

Year	University Pennant
2026	Cambridge
2025	Cambridge
2024	Cambridge
2023	Oxford Brookes
2022	London
2021	Race cancelled
2020	Race cancelled
2019	Race cancelled
2018	Cambridge Women
2017	Cambridge Women
2016	Cambridge Women
2015	Cambridge Women
2014	Newcastle
2013	Reading
2012	Reading
2011	Oxford Brookes
2010	Durham
2009	Osiris (Oxford Women)
2008	Osiris
2007	Osiris
2006	Osiris
2005	Univ.: Cambridge Women; BUSA: Durham
2004	Osiris (Univ. & BUSA)
2003	Osiris (Univ. & BUSA)
2002	Race cancelled
2001	Cambridge Women (Univ. & BUSA)
2000	Oxford Women (Univ. & BUSA)
1999	Cambridge Women (Univ. & BUSA)
1998	Cambridge Women
1997	Cambridge Women
1996	Cambridge Women
1995	Oxford Women
1994	London
1993	Cambridge Women

=== University races ===
A number of university boat clubs have organised annual races between themselves. These include:

- Oxford and Cambridge – The Boat Race and Women's Boat Race and The Lightweight Boat Races (later two were formerly part of the Henley Boat Races)
- Durham and Newcastle – The Boat Race of the North
- Bristol and UWE – Bristol Boat Race
- Edinburgh and Glasgow – The Scottish Boat Race
- De Montfort University and University of Leicester – Varsity of Leicester
- Aberdeen and Robert Gordon University – Aberdeen Universities Boat Race
- Manchester and Salford – Two Cities Boat Race
- Birmingham and University of Warwick – Varsity Boat Race
- Trinity College, Dublin and Queens University Belfast – Irish University Boat Race
- Swansea University and Cardiff University – The Welsh Boat Race
- University of Stirling and University of Dundee – Tayforth Boat Race

Some universities include rowing in multi-sport varsity competitions:

- University College London Boat Club and King's College London Boat Club – part of the London Varsity Series
- Queen Mary, University of London (non-medical section) and Barts and The London, Queen Mary's School of Medicine and Dentistry (medical school of QMUL) – part of the Merger Cup
- Liverpool, Leeds and Manchester – part of the Christie Cup
- University of Northumbria and Newcastle University – part of the Stan Calvert Cup
- University of Sheffield and Sheffield Hallam University – part of the Sheffield Varsity
- Kingston Student Rowing Club and University of Surrey Boat Club – part of the Varsity (until 2016)
- York and Lancaster – part of Roses Tournament
- University of Derby and University of Northampton – part of the Varsity Match

Collegiate universities also hold inter-collegiate competitions; these include:

- Cambridge (organised by Cambridge University Combined Boat Clubs):
  - University IVs
  - Lent Bumps
  - Small Boats Regatta
  - May Bumps
- Durham (organised by Durham College Rowing):
  - Novice Cup - a coxed IV regatta held in the first term for new rowers. Formerly known as the Hatfield Cup until 2003, when Durham College Rowing took over the organising of the event.
  - Novice Head - a 1.8 km upstream head race for novice coxed IVs.
  - Senate Cup - a regatta for men's and women's coxed IVs.
  - Senate Head - a 1.8 km upstream head race for experienced coxed IVs.
  - Admirals Regatta - generally the final rowing event of the academic year.
- London:
  - Allom Cup
  - United Hospitals regatta, head race and bumps races (for London medical, veterinary and allied students)
- Oxford (organised by Oxford University Rowing Clubs):
  - Autumn Fours
  - Isis Winter League
  - Torpids (bumps race)
  - Eights Week (bumps race)

== University boat clubs ==
=== England ===
University and college boat clubs in England that are members of British Rowing are listed by British Rowing under "University and College clubs".

Blade	Club	University	Notes
	Anglia Ruskin Boat Club	Anglia Ruskin University	
	Aston University Rowing Club	Aston University	Not a British Rowing member club
	Bath Spa University Boat Club	Bath Spa University	
	Bath University Boat Club	University of Bath	
	University of Birmingham Boat Club	University of Birmingham	
	Birmingham City University Boat Club	Birmingham City University	Not a British Rowing member club
	Bournemouth University Boat Club	Bournemouth University	
	University of Bradford Rowing Club	University of Bradford	Not a British Rowing member club
	University of Bristol Boat Club	University of Bristol	
	Brunel University Rowing Club	Brunel University	Not a British Rowing member club
	Cambridge University Boat Club	University of Cambridge	
	Cambridge University Women's Boat Club	University of Cambridge	Not a British Rowing member club
	Cambridge University Lightweight Rowing Club	University of Cambridge	Not a British Rowing member club
	Chester University Rowing Club	University of Chester	
	De Montfort University Rowing Club	De Montford University	
	University of Derby Rowing Club	University of Derby	
	Durham University Boat Club	University of Durham	
	University of East Anglia Boat Club	University of East Anglia	
	University of East London Boat Club	University of East London	Disaffiliated from British Rowing in 2024–25
	Essex University Rowing Club	Essex University	Disaffiliated from British Rowing in 2023–24
	Exeter University Boat Club	University of Exeter	
	Gloucestershire University Rowing Club	Gloucestershire University	
	Harper Adams University Rowing Club	Harper Adams University	
	Hartpury College and University Boat Club	Hartpury University	
	University of Hertfordshire Rowing Club	University of Hertfordshire	
	Hull University Boat Club	University of Hull	Disaffiliated from British Rowing in 2025–26
	Imperial College Boat Club	Imperial College London	
	Imperial College School of Medicine Boat Club	Imperial College, London	
	Keele University Boat Club	Keele University	
	University of Kent Rowing Club	University of Kent	
	Kingston Student Rowing Club	Kingston University	(Formerly Kingston University Boat Club); not a British Rowing member club
	Lancaster University Boat Club	Lancaster University	
	Leeds University Boat Club	University of Leeds	
	Leeds Beckett University Rowing Club	Leeds Beckett University	Disaffiliated from British Rowing in 2023–24
	University of Leicester Boat Club	University of Leicester	
	University of Lincoln Rowing Club	University of Lincoln	Not a British Rowing member club
	Liverpool John Moores University Rowing Club	Liverpool John Moores University	
	Liverpool University Boat Club	University of Liverpool	
	University of London Boat Club	University of London	
	Loughborough Students Rowing	University of Loughborough	
	Manchester University Boat Club	University of Manchester	
	Newcastle University Boat Club	Newcastle University	
	University of Northampton Rowing Club	University of Northampton	
	Northumbria University Boat Club	Northumbria University	
	Nottingham Trent University Rowing Club	Nottingham Trent University	
	Nottingham University Boat Club	University of Nottingham	
	Oxford University Boat Club	University of Oxford	
	Oxford University Women's Boat Club	University of Oxford	Disaffiliated from British Rowing in 2024–25
	Oxford University Lightweight Rowing Club	University of Oxford	Disaffiliated from British Rowing in 2023–24
	Oxford University Women's Lightweight Rowing Club	University of Oxford	Disaffiliated from British Rowing in 2025–26
	Oxford Brookes University Boat Club	Oxford Brookes University	
	University of Plymouth Rowing Club	University of Plymouth	
	University of Portsmouth Rowing Club	University of Portsmouth	
	Reading University Boat Club	University of Reading	
	Roehampton University Boat Club	University of Roehampton	Disaffiliated from British Rowing in 2025–26
	Royal Agricultural University Boat Club	Royal Agricultural University	Not a British Rowing member club
	Salford University Boat Club	University of Salford	
	Sheffield Hallam University Rowing Club	Sheffield Hallam University	
	Sheffield University Rowing Club	University of Sheffield	
	Southampton University Boat Club	University of Southampton	
	Southampton Solent University Boat Club	Southampton Solent University	Not a British Rowing member club
	Sunderland University Rowing Club	Sunderland University	
	University of Surrey Boat Club	University of Surrey	
	Teesside University Rowing Club	Teesside University	
	University of Warwick Boat Club	University of Warwick	
	University of the West of England Boat Club	University of the West of England	
	University of Westminster Boat Club	University of Westminster	Disaffiliated from British Rowing in 2023–24
	University of Worcester Rowing Club	University of Worcester	Not a British Rowing member club
	University of York Boat Club	University of York	
	York St John University Rowing Club	York St John University	

==== Cambridge college clubs ====
Blade	Club	University/College	Notes
	Caius Boat Club	Gonville and Caius College, Cambridge	
	Christ's College Boat Club	Christ's College, Cambridge	
	Churchill College Boat Club	Churchill College, Cambridge	
	Clare Boat Club	Clare College, Cambridge	
	Clare Hall Boat Club	Clare Hall, Cambridge	
	Corpus Christi College Boat Club (Cambridge)	Corpus Christi College, Cambridge	
	Darwin College Boat Club	Darwin College, Cambridge	
	Downing College Boat Club	Downing College, Cambridge	
	Emmanuel Boat Club	Emmanuel College, Cambridge	
	First and Third Trinity Boat Club	Trinity College, Cambridge	
	Fitzwilliam College Boat Club	Fitzwilliam College, Cambridge	
	Girton College Boat Club	Girton College, Cambridge	
	Homerton College Boat Club	Homerton College, Cambridge	
	Hughes Hall Boat Club	Hughes Hall, Cambridge	
	Jesus College Boat Club (Cambridge)	Jesus College, Cambridge	
	King's College Boat Club	King's College, Cambridge	
	Lady Margaret Boat Club	St John's College, Cambridge	
	Lucy Cavendish College Boat Club	Lucy Cavendish College, Cambridge	
	Magdalene Boat Club (Cambridge)	Magdalene College, Cambridge	
	Murray Edwards College Boat Club	Murray Edwards College, Cambridge	
	Newnham College Boat Club	Newnham College, Cambridge	
	Pembroke College Boat Club (Cambridge)	Pembroke College, Cambridge	
	Peterhouse Boat Club	Peterhouse, Cambridge	
	Queens' College Boat Club	Queens' College, Cambridge	
	Robinson College Boat Club	Robinson College, Cambridge	
	St Catharine's College Boat Club (Cambridge)	St Catharine's College, Cambridge	
	St Edmund's College Boat Club	St Edmund's College, Cambridge	
	Selwyn College Boat Club	Selwyn College, Cambridge	
	Sidney Sussex Boat Club	Sidney Sussex College, Cambridge	
	Trinity Hall Boat Club	Trinity Hall, Cambridge	
	Wolfson College Boat Club	Wolfson College, Cambridge	

==== Durham college clubs ====
Durham college clubs are members of Durham College Rowing.

Blade	Club	University/College	Notes
	Butler College Boat Club	Josephine Butler College, Durham	
	Collingwood College Boat Club	Collingwood College, Durham	
	Grey College Boat Club	Grey College, Durham	
	Hatfield College Boat Club	Hatfield College, Durham	
	Hild Bede Boat Club	College of St Hild and St Bede, Durham	
	John Snow College Boat Club	John Snow College, Durham	
	South College Boat Club	South College, Durham	
	St Aidan's College Boat Club	St Aidan's College, Durham	
	St Chad's College Boat Club	St Chad's College, Durham	
	St Cuthbert's Society Boat Club	St Cuthbert's Society, Durham	
	St John's College Boat Club	St John's College, Durham	
	St Mary's College Boat Club	St Mary's College, Durham	
	Stephenson College Boat Club	Stephenson College, Durham	
	Trevelyan College Boat Club	Trevelyan College, Durham	
	University College Boat Club	University College, Durham	
	Ustinov Boat Club	Ustinov College, Durham	Not a British Rowing member club
	Van Mildert Boat Club	Van Mildert College, Durham	

==== London college clubs ====
Blade	Club	University/College	Notes
	King's College London Boat Club	King's College London	
	London School of Economics Boat Club	London School of Economics	
	Queen Mary, University of London Boat Club	Queen Mary, University of London	
	Royal Free and University College Medical School Boat Club	Royal Free and University College Medical School	
	Royal Holloway, University of London Boat Club	Royal Holloway, University of London	
	Royal Veterinary College Boat Club	Royal Veterinary College	
	St Bartholomew's and The Royal London Hospitals' Boat Club	Barts and The London School of Medicine and Dentistry	
	St George's Hospital Medical School Boat Club	St George's Hospital and Medical School	
	United Hospitals Boat Club		
	University College London Boat Club	University College London	

==== Oxford college clubs ====
Blade	Club	University/College	Notes
	Balliol College Boat Club	Balliol College, Oxford	
	Brasenose College Boat Club (Oxford)	Brasenose College, Oxford	
	Christ Church Boat Club	Christ Church, Oxford	
	Corpus Christi College Boat Club (Oxford)	Corpus Christi College, Oxford	
	Exeter College Boat Club	Exeter College, Oxford	
	Green Templeton Boat Club	Green Templeton College, Oxford	
	Hertford College Boat Club	Hertford College, Oxford	
	Jesus College Boat Club (Oxford)	Jesus College, Oxford	
	Keble College Boat Club	Keble College, Oxford	
	Lady Margaret Hall Boat Club	Lady Margaret Hall, Oxford	
	Linacre College Boat Club	Linacre College, Oxford	
	Lincoln College Boat Club	Lincoln College, Oxford	
	Magdalen College Boat Club	Magdalen College, Oxford	
	Mansfield College Boat Club	Mansfield College, Oxford	
	Merton College Boat Club	Merton College, Oxford	
	New College Boat Club	New College, Oxford	
	Oriel College Boat Club	Oriel College, Oxford	
	Osler House Boat Club		Boat club for medical students.
	Pembroke College Boat Club (Oxford)	Pembroke College, Oxford	
	Queen's College Boat Club	Queen's College, Oxford	
	Regent's Park College Boat Club	Regent's Park College, Oxford	
	Somerville College Boat Club	Somerville College, Oxford	
	St Anne's College Boat Club	St Anne's College, Oxford	
	St Antony's College Boat Club	St Antony's College, Oxford	
	St Benet’s, Blackfriars’ and Reuben College BC	St Benet's Hall, Oxford, Blackfriars, Oxford, Reuben College, Oxford	
	St Catherine's College Boat Club	St Catherine's College, Oxford	
	St Edmund Hall Boat Club	St Edmund Hall, Oxford	
	St Hilda's College Boat Club	St Hilda's College, Oxford	
	St Hugh's College Boat Club	St Hugh's College, Oxford	
	St John's College Boat Club	St John's College, Oxford	
	St Peter's College Boat Club	St Peter's College, Oxford	
	Trinity College Boat Club	Trinity College, Oxford	
	University College Boat Club (Oxford)	University College, Oxford	
	Wadham College Boat Club	Wadham College, Oxford	
	Wolfson College Boat Club	Wolfson College, Oxford	
	Worcester College Boat Club	Worcester College, Oxford	
	Worcester College Women's Boat Club	Worcester College, Oxford	Not a British Rowing member club

=== Northern Ireland ===
Blade	Club	University	Notes
	Queen's University Belfast Boat Club	Queen's University Belfast	
	Queen's University Belfast Ladies Boat Club	Queen's University Belfast	
	Ulster University Rowing Club	University of Ulster at Coleraine	

=== Scotland ===
Blade	Club	University	Notes
	Aberdeen University Boat Club	University of Aberdeen	
	Dundee University Boat Club	University of Dundee	
	Edinburgh University Boat Club	University of Edinburgh	
	Glasgow University Boat Club	University of Glasgow	
	Heriot Watt University Boat Club	Heriot Watt University	
	Robert Gordon University Boat Club	Robert Gordon University	
	Stirling University Boat Club	University of Stirling	
	Strathclyde University Boat Club	University of Strathclyde	
	University of St Andrews Boat Club	University of St Andrews	

=== Wales ===
Blade	Club	University	Notes
	Aberystwyth University Boat Club	Aberystwyth University	
	Bangor University Rowing Club	Bangor University	
	Cardiff University Rowing Club	Cardiff University	
	Swansea University Rowing Club	Swansea University	

== See also ==
- College rowing in the United States
- University and college sport
