= Tawe Phoenix Boat Club =

British rowing club

The Tawe Phoenix Boat Club
- Founded: 2010
- Affiliations: British Rowing
- Website: www.swanseaunirc.co.uk

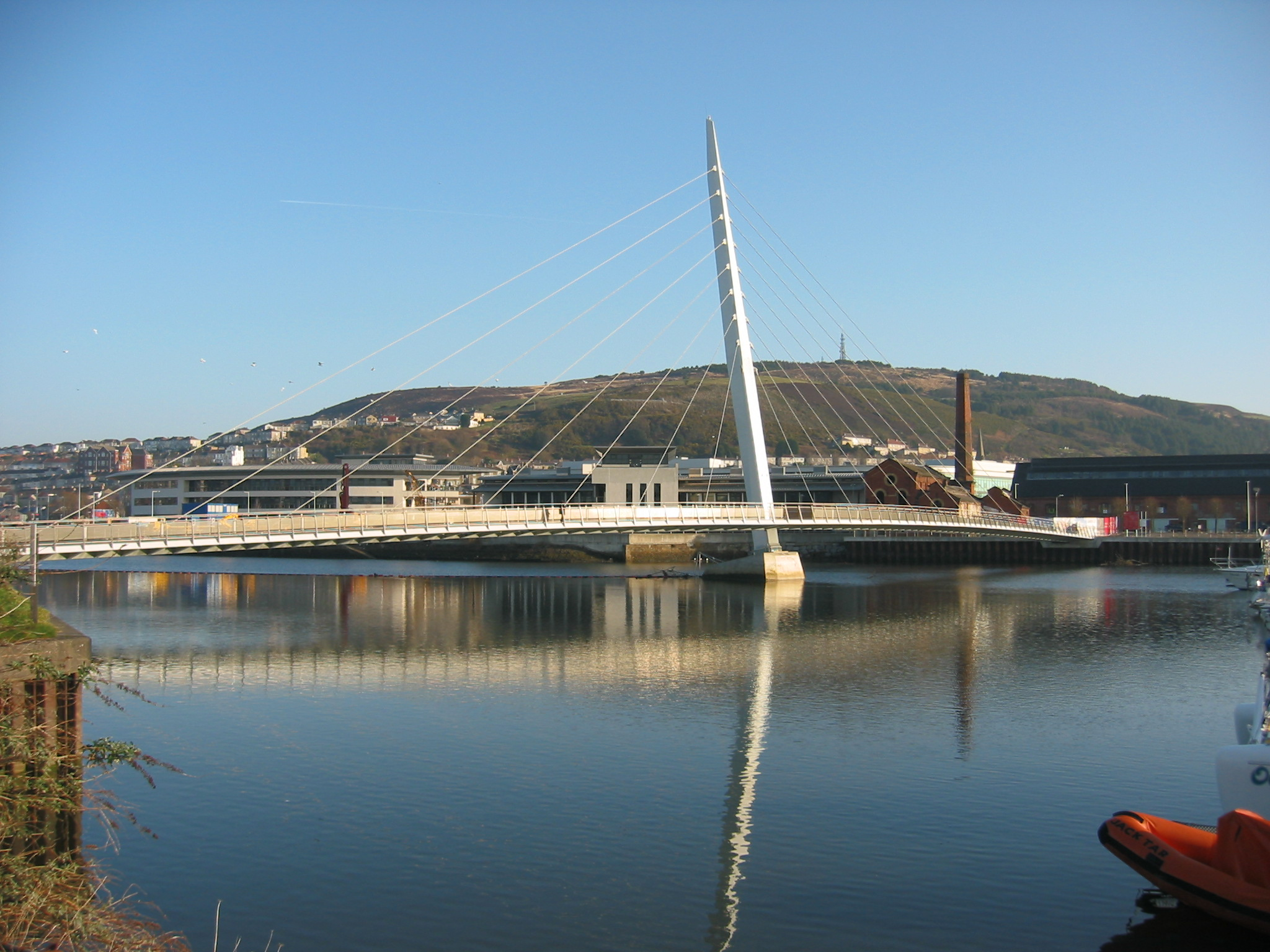
View of the Sail Bridge over the River Tawe from SURC trailer area

The Tawe Phoenix Boat Club is the alumni rowing club of Swansea University Rowing Club, and currently does not have a permanent boating base. The club was founded in 2010 and aims to support the interests of Swansea University Rowing Club, to enter some races and to meet up socially at various points throughout each year.

== History ==
The university club was started in the 1970s and closed in the early 1980s. Since then Will Edmondson and his sister Anne-Marie restarted the club by breaking into the shed and getting out the old boats in 1989. They were helped by Andrew Williams (of Mumbles ARC). Rob Jones joined the club at the end of 1989 and the club set about buying some kit. Will Garnier was President, Rob Jones was secretary and after a bit of work, they got an Eight (rowing) out for the Head of the River Race and raced at various events including Reading Town where they reached the final of the Senior 2 event. At this stage there were about 25 racing members and had a huge social section with parties at their boathouse on the Cwm Lleidi (Swiss Valley reservoir) reservoir near Llanelli. The President and Secretary looked into moving the club to the River Tawe by the Morfa Stadium and secured a small space to keep boats there. The club dissolved around 1995 and did not start again until 2004. In that time, the stadium had been demolished, with a number of university boats going with it.

The club was revived in 2004 by Tim Stickley, who found just one river-worthy boat in a shed by the university playing fields. An area was organised in the car park next to the River Tawe on which to put the club trailer and permission obtained from Swansea Yacht and Sub Aqua Club to use their slipway to launch. Membership has increased dramatically and the club's fleet of boats has grown over subsequent years, with different captains bringing new things to the club, notably a training camp and The Welsh Boat Race under Henry Hilsdon, a new trailer under Sophie Clarke-Hackston (club captain for 2 years) and a first boat race win under Jenny Staight. Club captains since then have been Steven Gray and Laura Kentfield.

== Notable members ==
Members of the club include Paralympic and World Championship finalist rowers such as James Roberts in the TA category. Also from SURC have been Welsh International rowers Daniel John and Kate Evans. Dan John won the coxless four event at the 2009 Home International Regatta. Kate Evans also placed 2nd at 2009 BUCS regatta in the women's lightweight singles event, and represented British Universities at the European Universities regatta.
