= UWK =

UWK can refer to:

- Ukraine without Kuchma, 2000–2001 protest movement in Ukraine
- Ultras White Knights, Egyptian Ultras group that supports Zamalek SC
- University of Warwick Boat Club, whose British Rowing boat code is UWK
- University of the Western Cape (Afrikaans: Universiteit van Wes-Kaapland), South Africa
