= SURC =

SURC may refer to:

- Small unit riverine craft
- Swansea University Rowing Club
- Southampton University Road Cycling
- Shrewsbury United Reformed Church
