= MCBC =

MCBC may refer to:

- Merton College Boat Club, Oxford, England
- Mansfield College Boat Club, Oxford, England
- Magdalen College Boat Club, Oxford, England
- The MC Bat Commander, Christian Jacobs
- Molson Coors Brewing Company, a North American brewing company encompassing Molson and Coors
