= University of Warwick Boat Club =

British rowing club

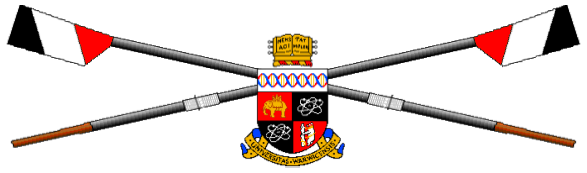

- Location: Barford, Warwickshire, UK
- Home water: River Avon
- Founded: 1967
- Membership: 125 (approx)
- Affiliations: British Rowing boat code - UWK
- Website: www.warwickrowing.com

Events
- Varsity

Notable members
- Tom Solesbury

The University of Warwick Boat Club is the rowing club of the University of Warwick. The club was founded in 1967 and as of 2025 has over 125 members. It rows out of a boathouse on a 2.2 km stretch of the River Avon, Warwickshire. It caters for all levels of rowers from novices to experienced oarsman. The club regularly attends races throughout the United Kingdom, including Fours Head, Eights Head, BUCS Head, BUCS Regatta, Marlow Regatta and Henley.

Notable former members include Oxford University Boat Club member and Boat Race winner Ben Ellison, Olympian Tom Solesbury, and Team GB para-rowing coxswain Oliver James MBE.

The club was known internationally for the nude wall calendars produced by its members, first as 'Warwick Rowers' later as 'Worldwide Roar'. However, the club and the calendar are no longer affiliated.

== Facilities ==
The club's facilities include 16 Concept2 ergos, kept at Warwick's Sports Centre. The club's men's 1st VIII rows in a 2023 wing-rigged Filippi Boats and their 2nd VIII 2011 wing-rigged Hudson Boatworks and the women's 1st VIII rows in a 2015 Filippi Boats. The club owns four further eights, three fours, and numerous small boats.

The club trains out of a newly rebuilt boathouse on a 2.2 km stretch of the River Avon south of Warwick Castle.

== History ==
The University of Warwick was established in 1965; during the first year there was no rowing club associated with the university. In 1966 there were several undergraduates who had previous rowing experience at their Schools, these undergraduates began by boating out of Stratford Rowing Club. With the first race being in a Coxed Pair, borrowed from Stratford R.C.

During the academic year 1967-68 John Fawthrop and Godfrey Bishop, the Clubs Treasurer and Captain respectively, had started the process of registering the club with ARA (now British Rowing), as well as designing the first kit with the notable red, white and black colours. It was at this stage that the club began to attract many new members, which Stratford RC weren't able to accommodate. So the search started for a location to build the boathouse and a stretch of river to row on.

Godfrey began looking at the local Ordnance Survey map to examine a suitable stretch of the River Avon. He was able to borrow a canoe; and paddled down the river Avon from Warwick Castle to the little village of Barford. After leaving Warwick Castle behind he stumbled across a gold mine; the river opened up to reveal a stretch wide enough for side by side racing.

After some research it was found out that the land was owned by a Mr Smith-Ryland, Lord Lieutenant of Warwickshire and a keen supporter of youth sport. Through Mr Bruce-Lockhart, the university's Development Officer, the club was able to set up a meeting with Mr Smith-Ryland, who could not have been more helpful. He drove them to a site alongside the river which was deemed suitable and agreed access across his farmland.

Once a suitable stretch of river was found for the Boathouse to be built on, the club set about purchasing a few boats and oars. Two coxed IV's from Wallingford RC, a new Sims coxless IV, and oars from Kingston Rowing Club.

The first boat entered under the name UWBC was a IV-
Bow: Godfrey Bishop
2: John Fawthrop
3: Dave Brown (ex Bedford Modern School)
Stroke: Diegan Morris (ex Radley College)
Coach: Henry Hatton (Leander and Stratford RC)

Land training began at Woodlands School, Coventry (the university currently had no sports centre). Boats were kept under the flood arch of the new motorway bridge until the Boathouse was built in August 1968.

The club first completed in Eights Head of the River Race in 1970.

Since then a new Boathouse has been built (2010), due to the increase in the number of boats the club owns. And the site has undergone various upgrades including a new floating pontoon.

== Results ==
The Club has broken a number of records recently, with these held in a spreadsheet for all to see. The Club jointly held the course record for the Challenge Academic category at WeHoRR from 2023-2025. In recent years it has won BUCS Medals at all three BUCS Rowing events. It last qualified for Henley Women's Regatta in 2026 and Henley Royal Regatta in 2025. The club looks to build on this success alongside Head Coach Gavin McWilliams.

== Ursus Boat Club ==
The club's alumni maintain strong links with the club through the Warwick Graduate Boat Club, Ursus. Members of Ursus and UWBC regularly compete. The club hosts an annual ball, which sees some friendly side by side racing between Ursus and current UWBC members, before having a sit down meal in the evening.

Ursus was set up in 2002 by alumni Ken Loveday and Mark Williams with the help of the executive committee for that year. The newly established boat club had two primary functions, firstly to enable old friends to keep in touch with each other and the club and secondly to help with the purchasing of new equipment for UWBC. The Alumni were instrumental in the purchase of the new Men's 1st VIII and continue to support the club as it modernises its fleet.

Alumni of the club include Boat Race winner Ben Ellison and Olympic rower Tom Solesbury.

== Warwick Rowers / Worldwide Roar calendars ==
In 2009, members of the men's team began independently producing an annual wall calendar featuring them modeling nude, as 'Warwick Rowers', donating the proceeds from sales to help fund the team. In 2012 they began donating proceeds from sales of the calendar as well as related media and merchandise to Sport Allies, an independent charity created by them 'to reach out to young people challenged by bullying, homophobia or low self-esteem'. With the university fully funding the club, Sport Allies later became the sole beneficiary of the Warwick Rowers. In 2011 the women's team began producing a similar calendar featuring its rowers, sharing proceeds with Macmillan Cancer Support. In 2019, 'Warwick Rowers' rebranded itself as 'Worldwide Roar'. The club now has no connection to the calendar.
