= York St John University Rowing Club =

British rowing club

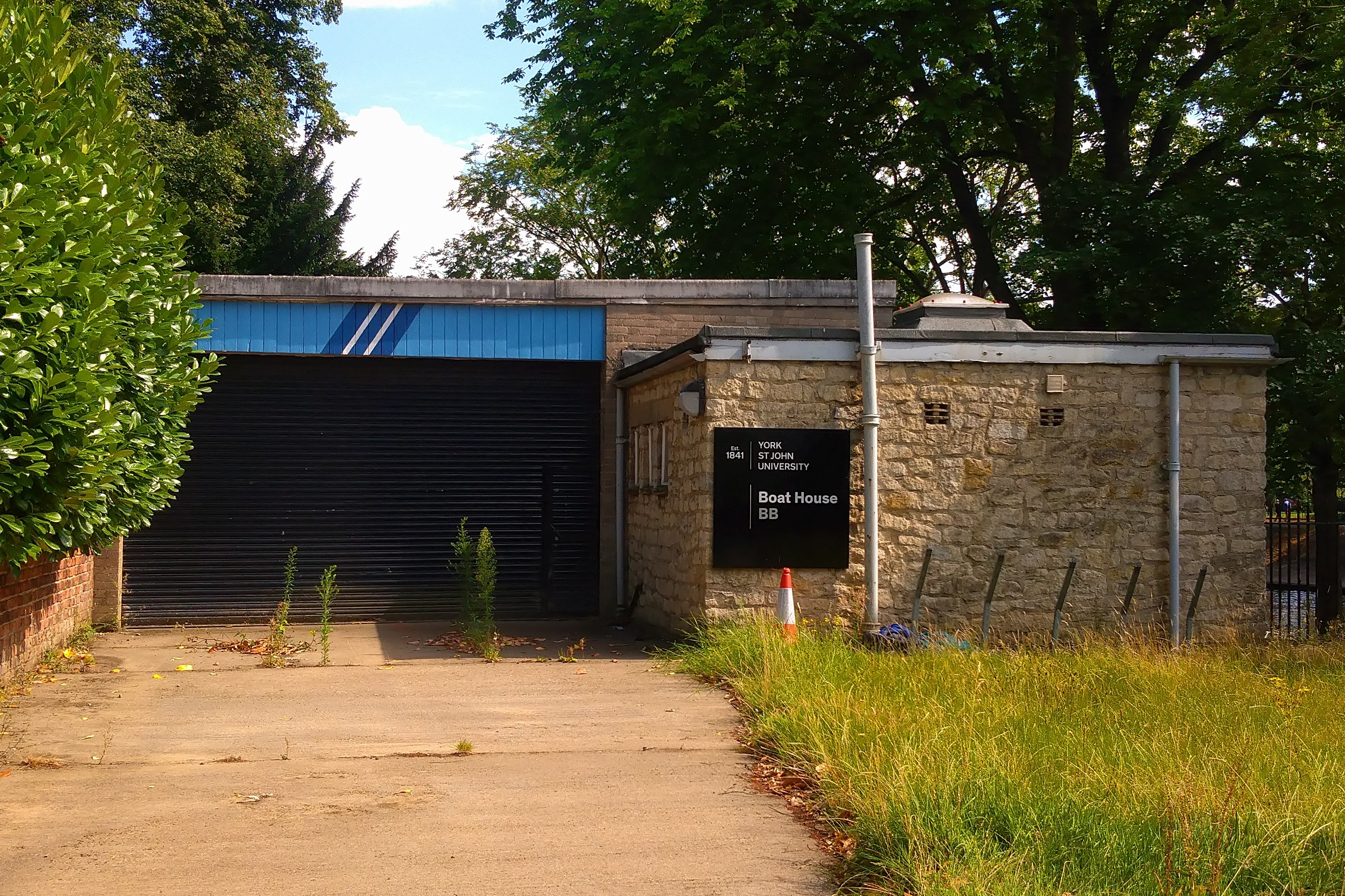

- Location: York, Yorkshire, England, UK
- Home water: River Ouse
- Founded: 1852
- Membership: 80
- University: York St John University
- Affiliations: British Rowing
- Website: https://ysjsu.com/activities/boatclub

York St. John University Boat Club (YSJBC) has a history beginning in 1852, eleven years after the founding of the institution where it is based. YSJ BC is notable for being the longest standing club of the university and has an affiliation to British Rowing.

The club has Men's and Women's squads and is one of the many clubs of the York St John Students' Union. The majority of members learn to row on arrival at university. YSJRC welcomes students, alumni and staff to participate in the club.

The boathouse is based beside the River Ouse, opposite York City Rowing Club between Lendal Bridge and the Scarborough Railway Bridge next to the Museum Gardens.

== Boathouse and facilities ==
The club's boathouse sits on 21 km of row-able water, on the River Ouse; it is approximately 12 km downstream from 'The Split' (where the Nidd and Ouse meet, but where on approaching from York the rivers 'split') and 9 km upstream from Naburn Lock. The stone and concrete boathouse nestles into land adjacent to the Museum Gardens. The building replaced the wooden boathouse at the bottom of Marygate in York during an early heyday for the club in the 1960s at the request of the then St John's College Principal, Canon Lamb, by the George Pace firm of architects, who also refurbished the College Chapel and built a new Chapel in 1966.

== Racing ==
The club competes at a number of regattas and head races throughout the academic year (September - August). Prior to Christmas the club's main focus is BUCS competition and the York Small Boats Head. These events provide developing crews with the academic year's first taste of inter-university competition and the beginner crews with the first chance to apply what they have learnt in race conditions. The club also sends its athletes to the National Indoor Rowing Championships.

After Christmas, the club enters a number of events during the continuing head season. These include Durham Small Boats Head and a Varsity match against the University of York Boat Club. From 2010 the club has entered the women's and men's Head of the River Races too. Following further training in the Easter vacation the summer sees attendance at the York Spring Regatta, the BUCS Regatta and other regional regattas such as Doncaster, Durham, Bradford, Tees and York Summer.

== Kit and blades ==
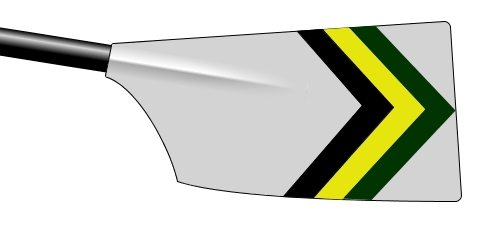
A previous blade design

Club members race in a tri-colour kit. It is Royal Blue and Sky Blue and White side stripes. In addition to this, the vast majority of the club own numerous other items of kit including the ubiquitous splash jacket A rowing splash jacket is a wind and splash proof, ventilated, long-sleeved jacket that is designed for rowing and bankside activity. The Club crest is similar to the York St John University crest but includes two rowing blades with the blade colours.

The current blades are Sky Blue with a Royal Blue 'Y" representing the geographical location of the club, York. The previous blades were white with three chevrons; bottle green, gold and black (green nearest the blade tip) on a white background.

== See also ==
- University rowing (UK)
