= University of Kent Rowing Club =

British rowing club

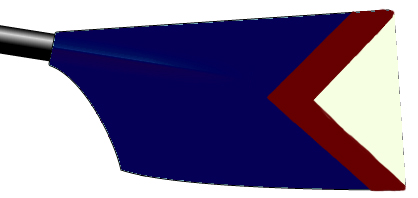
- Location: Canterbury, Kent, England
- Home water: Plucks Gutter, Kent
- Founded: 1966
- University: University of Kent
- Affiliations: British Rowing
- Website: www.ukcrowingclub.co.uk

The University of Kent Rowing Club (UKCRC) is the rowing club of the University of Kent based at Plucks Gutter, River Stour, Kent, England. The club is entirely run by a student based committee and has regularly competed in competition with moderate levels of success and is affiliated to British Rowing.

== History ==
The club was founded in 1966 and were based at the Somerset Maugham boathouse, located at Plucks Gutter on the River Stour, outside of Sandwich.

In 1992, the club scored a double success at the Maidstone Invicta Head.

From September 2018 to April 2020, the club was located at Westbere Lake, located outside of Sturry and shared facilities with the King's School, Canterbury Boat Club. As of September 2025, the Club returned to training at Somerset Maugham Boat House on the River Stour.

=== Fleet ===
The club primarily sweeps, with the majority of the fleet being composed of coxed fours (4+). In addition the club owns several double sculls (2x) and pairs (2-). Due to the narrow width of the River Stour at Plucks Gutter, rowing in eights (8+) was not possible. As a result of the move to Westbere Lake, the club was able to start training and competing in eights (8+).

== Training ==
The club train throughout the year and holds a week-long winter training camp over the Christmas holidays and a two-week-long training camp over Easter to prepare for BUCS regatta. All land training takes place in the University of Kent's gym in the centre of campus, with access to club ergos on the balcony of one of the sports centre's halls. The club caters to rowers of all abilities, with dedicated programmes for both novice and senior members, which includes weight training and circuits. In addition, the club provides coaching to all their coxswains.

== Club kit ==
The club colours are ivory, navy and claret which represents the University of Kent.

== Spitfire Boat Club ==
Spitfire Boat Club was created as a club for the alumni of the University Rowing Club in 2001 and became an open club with membership available to members of the public in 2002.

== See also ==
- University of Kent
- University rowing (UK)
- Kent Union
