= St Antony's College Boat Club =

British rowing club

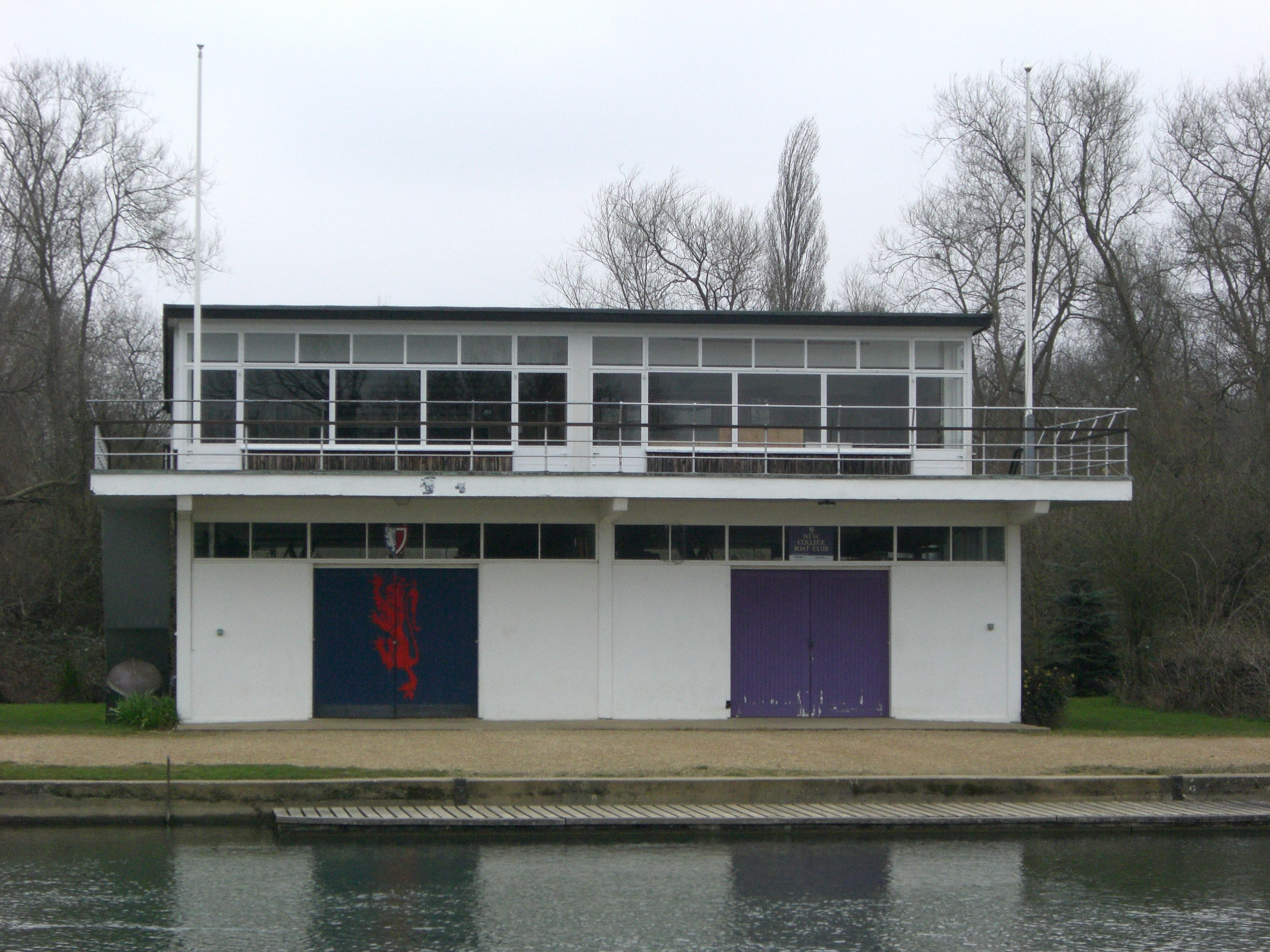

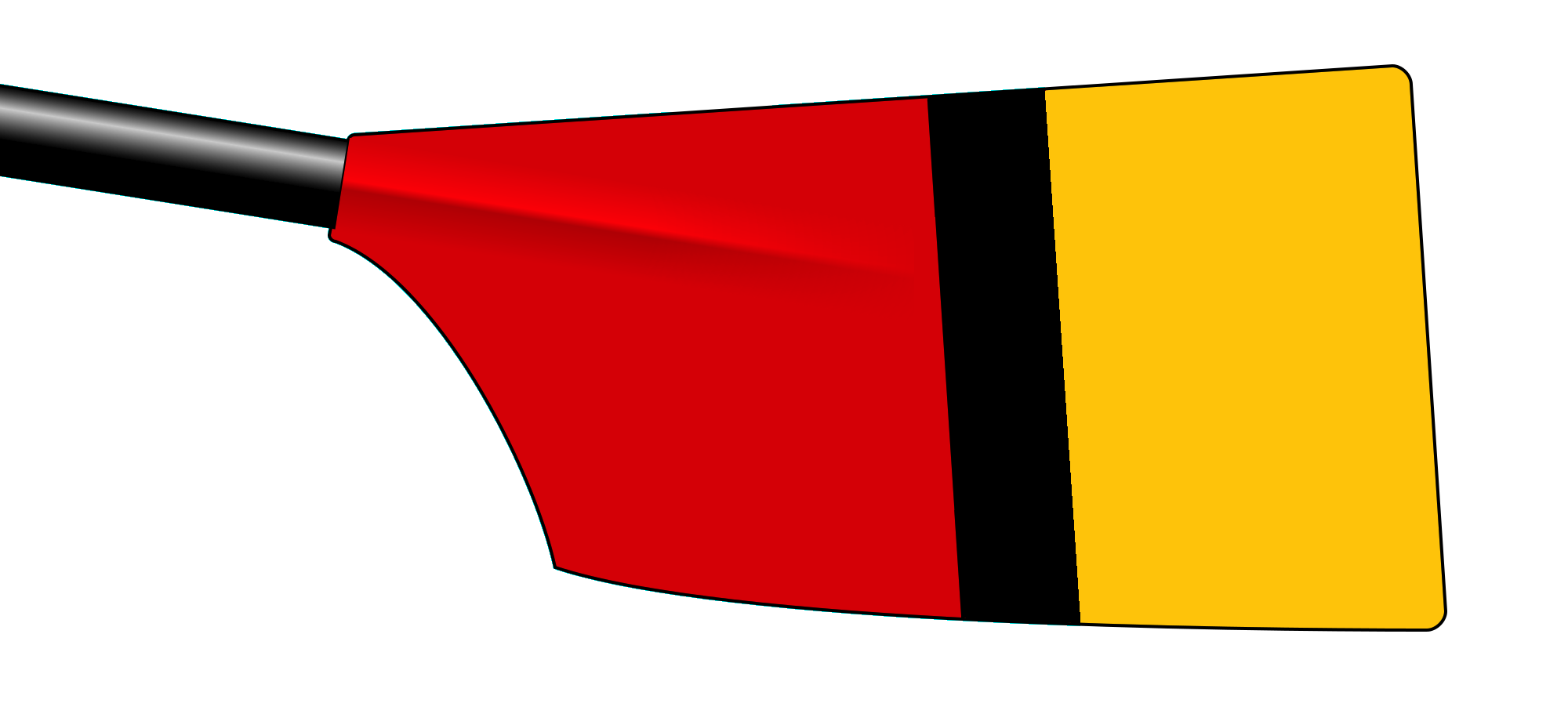
- Boathouse shared with New College and Balliol
- Location: Boathouse Island, Christ Church Meadow, Oxford
- Coordinates: 51.742973°N 1.249057°W
- Home water: The Isis
- Founded: 1994
- University: University of Oxford
- Affiliations: British Rowing (boat code SAY); Wolfson College BC (Sister college)
- Website: stantonysboatclub.wixsite.com/stantonysboatclub

St Antony's College Boat Club is a rowing club for members of St Antony's College, Oxford. It is based on the Isis at Boathouse Island, Christ Church Meadow, Oxford and shares facilities at the boathouse belonging to New College Boat Club.

== History ==
The club was founded in 1994 and has a strong record in Torpids and Summer Eights.

In 2024, Annie Sharp became the club's first representative in women's The Boat Race. and the following year Alexia Lowe participated in The Boat Race 2025.

== Honours ==
=== Boat Race representatives ===
The following rowers were part of the rowing club at the time of their participation in The Boat Race.

Women's boat race

Year	Name
2024	Annie Sharp
2025	Alexia Lowe

== See also ==
- University rowing (UK)
- Oxford University Boat Club
- Rowing on the River Thames
