= Manchester University Boat Club =

British Rowing Club

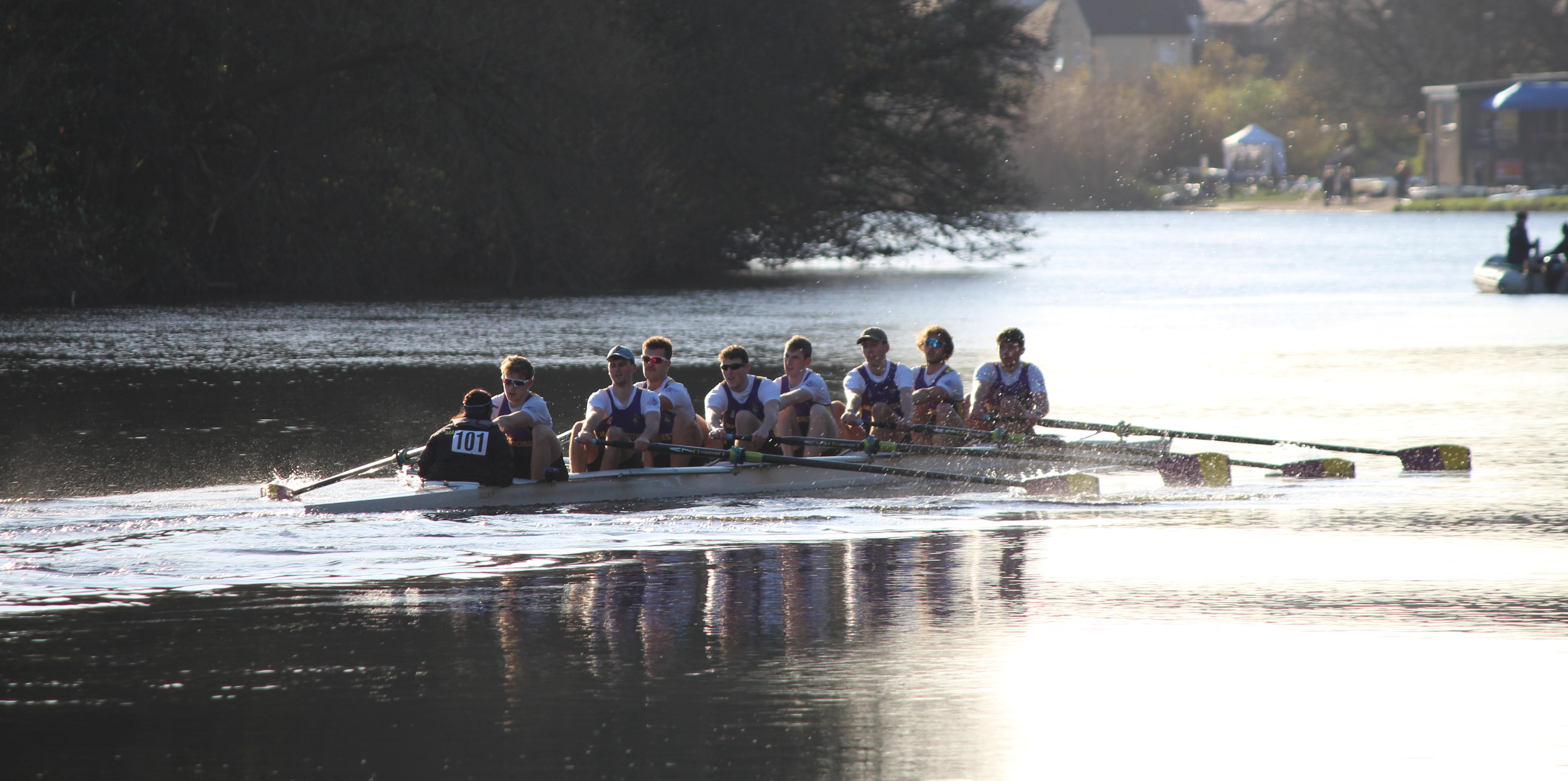

- Location: Sale, Greater Manchester
- Home water: Bridgewater Canal
- Founded: 1889 - Owens College Boat Club; 1907-1909 - Manchester University Boat Club; 1932-2004 - Manchester University Boat Club; 1994-2004 - UMIST Rowing Club; 2004 - Manchester University Boat Club
- Affiliations: British Rowing boat code MANU; BUCS
- Website: mubc.org.uk

Manchester University Boat Club (MUBC) is the rowing club of the University of Manchester. While university rowing at Manchester has earlier origins, the present-day club was founded in 1932, and has been based on the Bridgewater Canal since 1963. It is one of the largest sports clubs at the University of Manchester, taking in over 100 members every year.

== Facilities ==
The MUBC boat house is located 6 miles south of the University of Manchester's main campus on Oxford Road, near Dane Road tram stop. The boat house has three boat storage bays, one dedicated to smaller sculling boats. MUBC rows on an 8-mile stretch of the Bridgewater Canal. Additionally MUBC has an erg room located at the university's Armitage Sports Centre at the Fallowfield Campus.

== History ==
Rowing at the predecessor institutions of the University of Manchester began in 1862 with a coxed four race between Owens College and the Physical Laboratory. In 1889 the Owens College Boat Club was established, which was reconstituted as a member of the new Victoria University of Manchester Athletic Union in 1907. This club was short-lived and closed in 1909.

In 1932 the University of Leeds challenged the University of Manchester Athletic Union (AU) to a boat race. The AU declined, as Manchester did not have a boat club, however a number of students who had rowed before at other universities or at school soon established a club to race against Leeds. The re-established MUBC was based at Agecroft Rowing Club. Manchester University Women's Boat Club was established in 1960, and merged into MUBC when the university athletic unions were merged in the early 1980s. In 1963 MUBC moved to its present boat house at Dane Road in Sale. The opening of the new boat house was celebrated with a scratch IVs event. Manchester University was represented at Henley Royal Regatta for the first time in 1966, entering the Thames Challenge Cup, where BBC commentator Harry Carpenter announced: “…and here comes this exciting new crew from… Manchester United”.

In 1994 UMIST was granted a royal charter as an independent university and began rowing separately. This lasted for a decade until 'Project Unity' merged UMIST and the Victoria University into the present-day University of Manchester. The colours of purple and yellow - and so the new rowing blades - were adopted that year. Prior to 2004 MUBC blades were in the maroon and white colours adopted by the Victoria University of Manchester Athletic Union in 1905, and UMIST blades were in black and white.

== Two Cities Boat Race ==
The Two Cities Boat Race, described by the Manchester Evening News as the "real university boat race" has been held between MUBC and the Salford University Boat Club since 1972. This was initially part of the Agecroft Regatta and consisted of one men's eight. MUBC had always competed at a higher level than Salford, however the race was initiated by Roger Vaughn (Captain of Agecroft Rowing Club) in recognition of Salford's improvement. The vast majority of Two Cities victories have gone to the University of Manchester, with Salford's first win in 2000. The race is now a multi-race regatta over either 650m or 500m, held at Salford Quays and finishing under the Lowry Bridge. Recent years have seen the involvement of alumni from both boat clubs, often taking the form of an alumni VIII.

The event became a high-profile event for both universities in the 2010s, when it was combined with other watersports such as Dragon Boat racing to make it the "biggest event in the sporting calendar", according to the University of Manchester.

The Two Cities Boat Race was put on a two year hiatus in 2020 and 2021 due to the COVID-19 pandemic.

=== Results Since 2000 ===
Year	SM VIII	SW VIII	NM VIII	NW VIII	SM IV	SW IV	NM IV	NW IV	SM 1x	SW 1x	Alumni VIII	Overall
2025												Race Not Held
2024	Manchester	Manchester									Nemesis	Manchester Win
2023											Buffalo	Manchester Win
2022												Manchester Win
2021												Race Not Held
2020												Race Not Held
2019			Manchester	Salford	Manchester	Manchester			Manchester	Salford	Nemesis	Manchester Win
2018	Manchester					Manchester	Salford	Manchester	Salford	Salford	Buffalo	Salford Win
2015	Manchester	Manchester	Manchester	Manchester					Manchester	Manchester	Nemesis	Manchester Win
2013												Salford Win
2012												Manchester Win
2011	Manchester					Manchester	Manchester	Manchester	Manchester	Salford	Buffalo	Manchester Win
2010												Manchester Win
2009												Manchester Win
2008												Manchester Win
2007												Manchester Win
2006												Manchester Win
2005												Manchester Win
2004												Manchester Win
2003												Manchester Win
2002												Manchester Win
2001												Manchester Win
2000												Salford Win

== Nemesis Boat Club ==
Nemesis Boat Club was founded in 2005 as the alumni club for MUBC. In 2008 it was affiliated with British Rowing, allowing members to race at Henley Royal Regatta. Since 2005 Nemesis has challenged MUBC for the Bridgewater Cup, which takes place on the day of the Two Cities Boat Race.

From 1847 to 1920 another boat club of the same name had a close association with the predecessors to MUBC. This Nemesis Boat Club was based on New Bailey Street in Manchester and its association with university rowing in the city goes back to the first inter-faculty boat races at Owens College in the 1860s where crews would boat from Nemesis. From 1894 to 1909 Owens College Boat Club and the early Manchester University Boat Club operated from the Nemesis boathouse. Nemesis folded in 1920, during the 1909-1932 break in rowing at the University of Manchester.

== See also ==
- University rowing in the United Kingdom
