= Collingwood College Boat Club =

British rowing club

- Motto: French: Aime le meilleur
- Location: Collingwood College Boat House, Durham
- Coordinates: 54°46′34″N 1°33′46″W
- Home water: River Wear
- Founded: 1981; 45 years ago
- Affiliations: British Rowing, Collingwood College, Durham University

Collingwood College Boat Club (CCBC) is the rowing club of Collingwood College, part of Durham University.

CCBC was formed in 1981 and is housed in the Collingwood College boathouse on the north bank of the regatta stretch of the River Wear. The boathouse used to belong to St Hild's College, before it merged with Bede College to form College of St Hild and St Bede, Durham.

Collingwood has raced at Henley Royal Regatta four times and is a regular entrant to the Head of the River Race, Women's Head of the River Race and Durham Regatta.

CCBC is a registered Boat Club through British Rowing, with Boat Code "COC" and is a member organisation of Durham College Rowing.

The club is led by an executive committee elected by the boat club members.

== Racing ==
CCBC has competed in races and regattas both in the North East and the rest of the United Kingdom:

International events

- Henley Royal Regatta
- Henley Women's Regatta
- Régate Des 3 Châteaux
- The Head of the River Race
- Women's Head of the River Race
- Budapest Cup Regatta

National events

- BUCS 4s and 8s Head
- BUCS Regatta (National Watersports Centre)
- Durham Regatta
- Rutherford Head of the River (Newcastle)
- Marlow Regatta (Dorney Lake, Eton)

Regional events

- Bradford Sprint Regatta
- Chester-le-Street Regatta
- Durham Autumn Small Boats Head
- Durham City Regatta
- Durham Long Distance Sculls
- Durham Small Boats Head
- Hexham Regatta
- Tees Small Boats Head
- Tyne Head of the River
- Tyne United New Years Head
- Tyne United Small Boats Head
- York Small Boats Head
- York Spring Regatta
- York Summer Regatta

College events

- Admirals Regatta
- Novice Cup & Head
- Senate Cup & Head
- Hayward Cup: Stockton-on-Tees (discontinued)
- Butler Head (discontinued)
- Mildert Head (discontinued)

== Henley Royal Regatta ==
CCBC has raced at Henley Royal Regatta four times.

Event	Year	Round	Crew
The Visitors' Challenge Cup	2015	Round 1	N. Connell, J. Ballinger, E. Ninham, A. Wilson
The Prince Albert Challenge Cup	2006	Round 1	H. Lester, R. Dimock, C. Carey, J. Watkins, O. Harvey
The Temple Challenge Cup	2005	Round 1	R. Fisher, R. Dimock, J. Strang, N. Scott, G. Lindop, S. Cooper, C. Carey, S. Doody, K. Smith
The Britannia Challenge Cup	2000	Round 2	R. Collings, E. Killick, S. Wood, R. Robson, K. Paget

== Henley Women's Regatta ==
CCBC has raced at Henley Women's Regatta two times.

Event	Year	Round	Crew
The Frank V Harry Cup	2019	Round 1	A. Hindmarsh, M. Halpin, L. Newbould, I. Webb, R. Carty
The Chairman's Trophy	2025	Round 1	E. Kempster, E. Bourne, A. Vyvyan-Robinson, R. Boddington

== Head of the River Races ==
CCBC regularly enters several crews into the Head of the River Race and Women's Head of the River Race. The highest placed finishes are recorded below.

Event	Crew	Year	Place	Time	Crew
The Head of the River Race	1st VIII	2022	101st	19:42.90	G. Senthilnathan, W. Harshorn, A. Waring, J. Bird, S. Young, B. Meehan, B. Williams, A. Loveday, T. Osrin
The Head of the River Race	1st VIII	2015	131st	19:28.00	D. Yu, N. Connell, S. Jamieson, C. Stayton, R. Barton, B. Balmforth, J. Ballinger, A. Wilson, E. Ninham
The Head of the River Race	2nd VIII	2018	213th	20:50.50	R. Carty, E. Cazzoli, J. Chouard, R. Barton, T. Honeywell, A. Galbraith, F. Wojtan, N. Ayers, J. Emery
The Head of the River Race	2nd VIII	2001	308th	20:39.27	
The Head of the River Race	3rd VIII	2022	270th	23:26.90	H. Maxwell, A. Trott, A. Osborne, K. Peirbody, D. Lehmann, C. Scott, J. Hircock, J. Baxter, D. Ridges
The Head of the River Race	4th VIII	2023			T. Roose, J. Jacouris, D. Ridges, J Peggie, O. Taylor, W. Hurst, S. Bilacz, O. Coote, H. Stevens
Women's Head of the River Race	1st VIII	2003	103rd	23:16.22	
Women's Head of the River Race	1st VIII	2025	107th	21:45.9	M. Rodgers, E. Kempster, E. Bourne, A. Vyvyan-Robinson, S. Rollason, E. Spanton, M. Ogden, C. Polomsky, R. Boddington
Women's Head of the River Race	1st VIII	2010	139th	21:17.67	E. Cox, E. Mollett, J. Flack, H. Horton, O. Mercer, E. Brewer, S. Norden, J. Guderley, R. Upstill-Goddard
Women's Head of the River Race	2nd VIII	2022	251st	26:11.50	J. Barton, S. Rollason, J. Adam, K. Macklow-Smith, G. Murphy, K. Tan, E. Bennett, H. Mottram, N. Barry
Women's Head of the River Race	2nd VIII	2025	276th	24:28.2	O. Coote, L. Forrest, A. Dixon, K. Mitchell, F. Miller, L. Tarasenko, E. Dobson, H. Asling, E. Ross-Bustgaard

== See also ==
- University rowing (UK)
- List of rowing clubs on the River Wear
