= Lady Margaret Hall Boat Club =

British rowing club

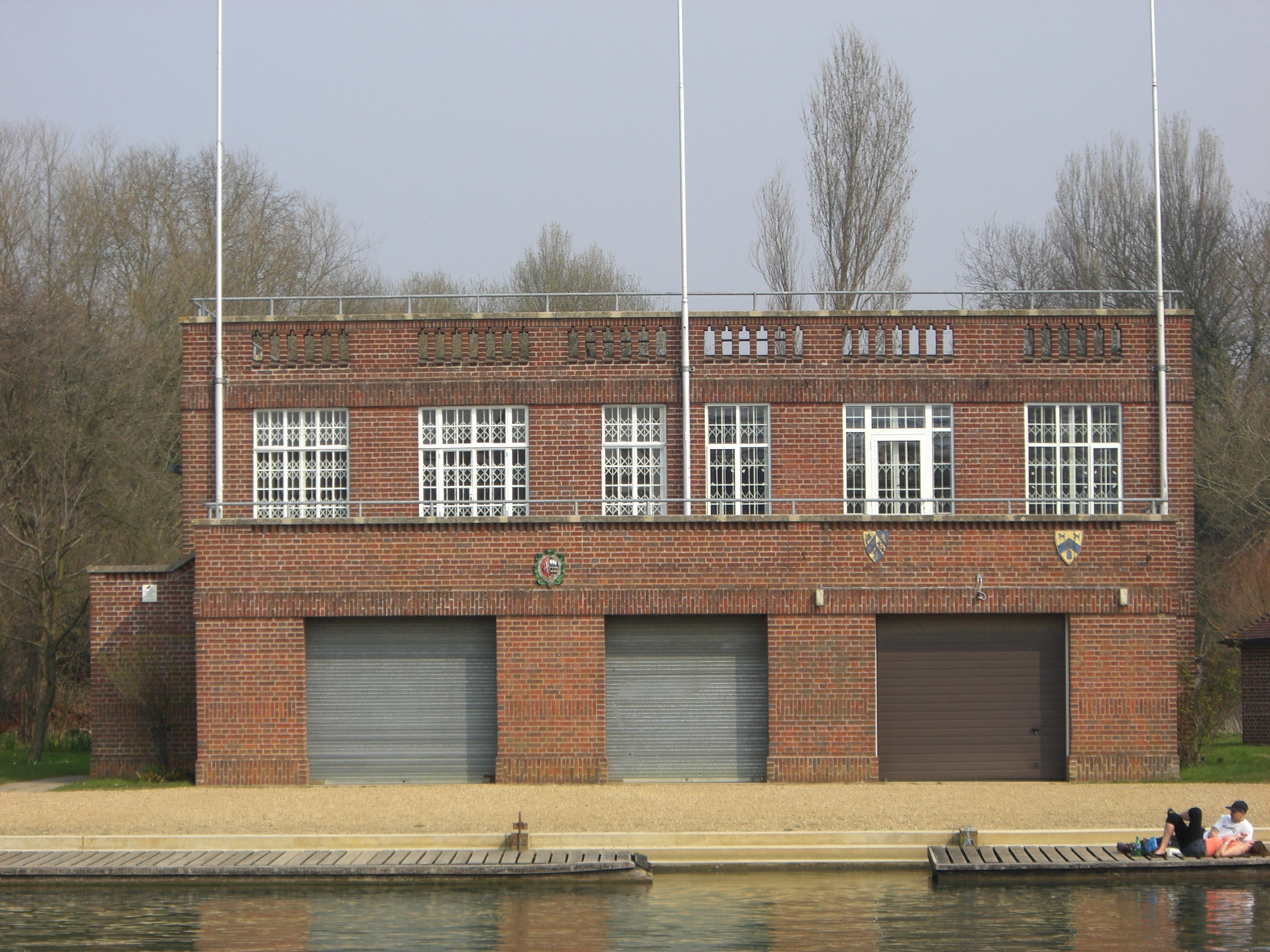

- Lady Margaret Hall Boat House, right (shared with Trinity College) and rowing blade colours
- Coordinates: 51°44′34″N 1°14′55″W
- Home water: River Thames
- Founded: 1899
- Membership: c. 60
- Head of the River: Women: 1977
- University: University of Oxford
- Affiliations: British Rowing boat code - LMH; Newnham College, Cambridge (Sister college)
- Website: www.lmhbc.org

Lady Margaret Hall Boat Club (LMHBC) is a rowing club for members and staff of Lady Margaret Hall (LMH), Oxford.

It was founded by 1899 although it was not able to compete in intercollegiate racing until 1976, when a women’s division was finally established. As the senior women’s college, LMH were placed at 1st on the river for the inaugural women’s bumps races and obtained Headship in 1977.

The first men’s crew was established in 1980 following the admission of male students into the previously all-women’s college.

== History ==
LMHBC first competed in inter-college OURCs racing events in 1977, when a women's division was finally established (LMH was a women-only college for the first 100 years of its foundation). As the senior women's college LMH was placed first on the river for the inaugural women's division. The club has provided rowers for the Boat Race, the Women's Boat Race, and the Isis Reserves Race.

A former president, Monica Fisher (née Pring-Mill) was responsible for instigating some of the biggest changes in Women's Boat Race history, which raised the regularity and status of that event.

For a period around 2010 three times World Lightweight Sculling Champion Peter Moir Haining coached LMHBC.

The club is affiliated to British Rowing.

== Honours ==
=== Boat Race representatives ===
The following rowers were part of the rowing club at the time of their participation in The Boat Race. Men's boat race

Year	Name
2015	James O'Connor
2018	Felix Drinkall
2018	Zachary Thomas Johnson (cox)
2019	Felix Drinkall
2020	Felix Drinkall
2020	Oliver Perry (cox)
2021	Felix Drinkall

Women's boat race

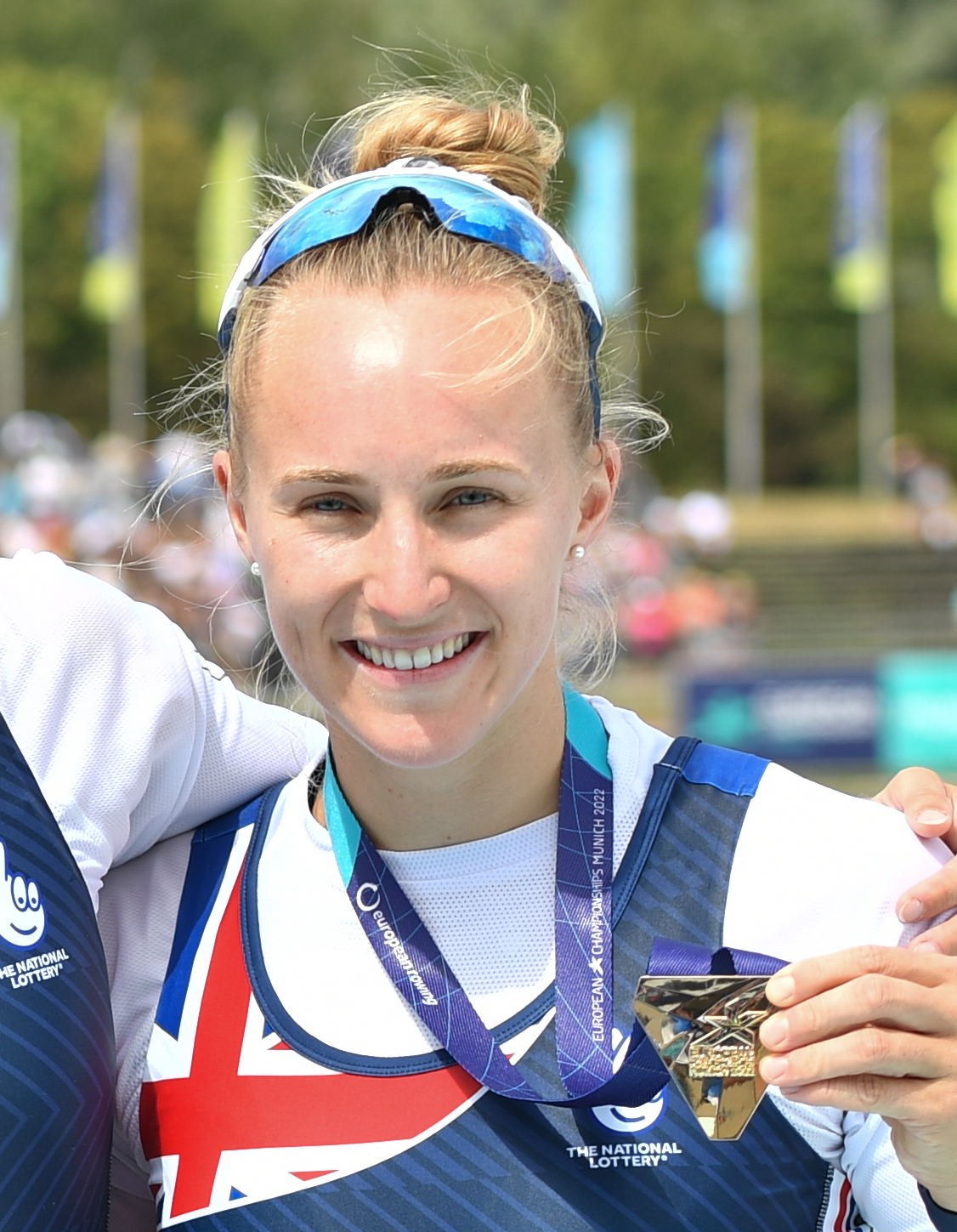
Heidi Long

Year	Name
2022	Annie Anezakis
2025	Heidi Long
2026	Heidi Long

== Results ==
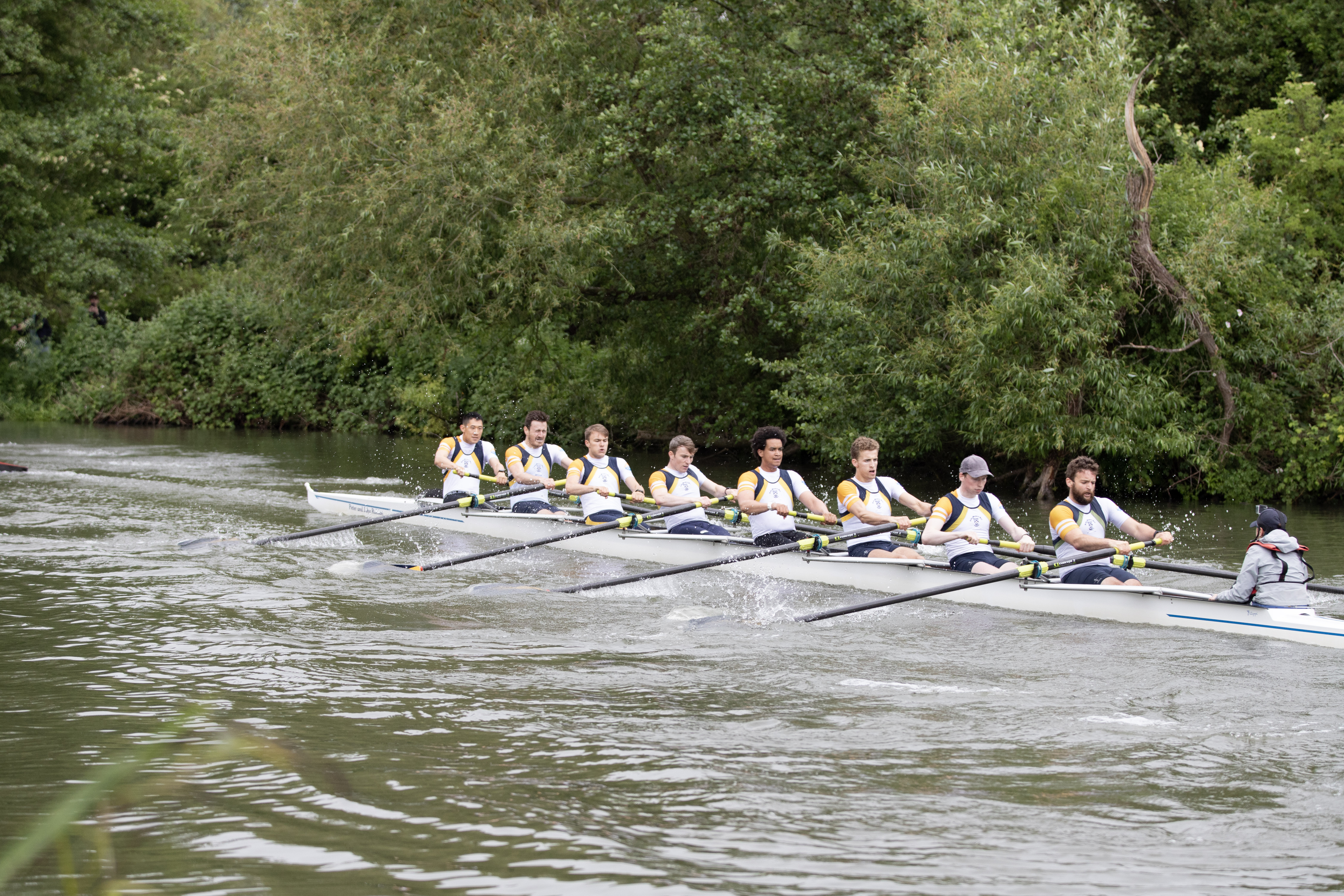
LMH Men's 1st VIII 2019

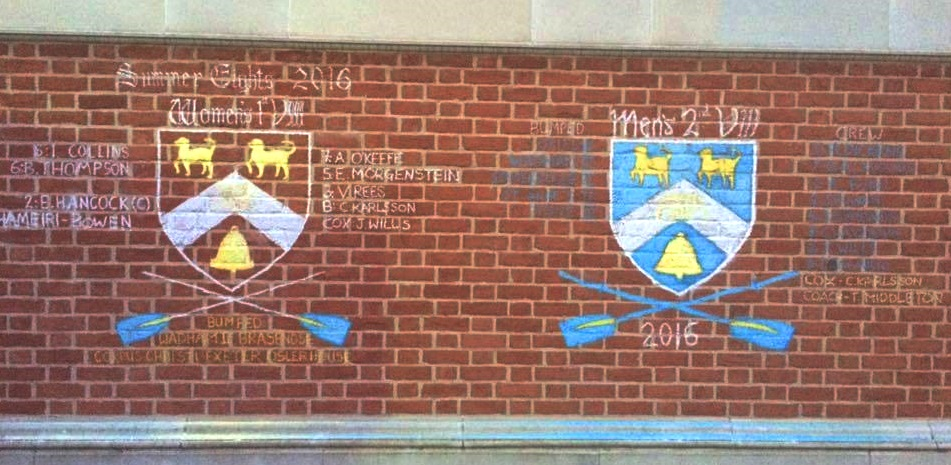
Chalk Arm in the College Record crews winning blades

=== Men's crews ===
Men's crews began competing for LMHBC in 1979/1980 (the year after LMH first admitted men). As a new boat, they entered the table at the bottom as 90th on the river. Over the following years, the Men's 1st VIII have gradually risen up the rankings. After first rowing in Division 1 as sandwich boat in 2017, the Men's 1st VIII finally secured their place in Division 1 for the first time in Summer Eights 2019.

The men's second VIII are 57th on the river as of 2019. A men's third VIII is periodically fielded. The Men's 1st VIII have raced in the Temple Challenge Cup at Henley Royal Regatta on several occasions.

=== Women's crews ===
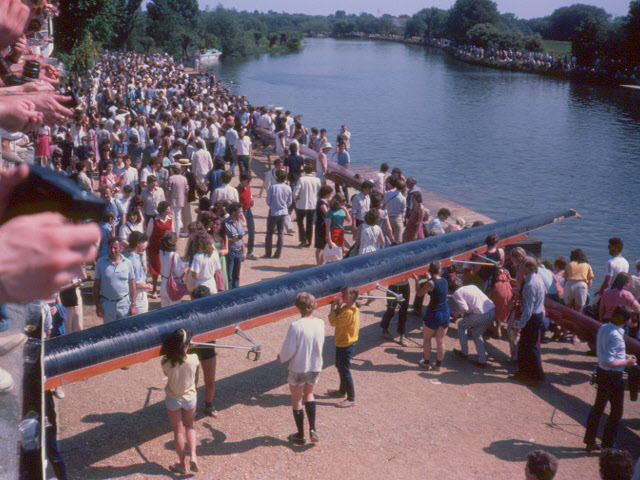
Eight's week in Oxford

The LMHBC women's first VIII had the Summer Eights headship in 1977, the inaugural year of women's inclusion in Summer Eights as recognised, distinct divisions. In 2017 it was 24th on the river. The LMH women's first VIII had the Torpids Headship in 1978 and was 25th on the river in 2019.

The LMHBC Women's second VIII first raced in 1986 and was 59th on the river in 2017. A women's third eight is periodically fielded.

== Blazer ==
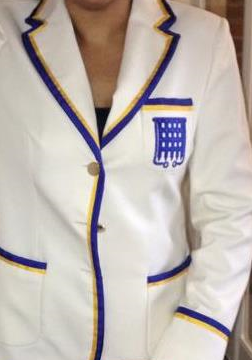
Lady Margaret Hall Boat Club Rowing Blazer

The boat club has an ivory blazer with blue and gold piping and cuff rings bearing the Beaufort portcullis device in blue on the left breast. This may be worn by men and women who have rowed in the first Summer VIII or first Torpid.

== See also ==
- Oxford University Rowing Clubs
- University rowing (UK)
