= Swansea University Rowing Club =

Welsh rowing club

- Location: River Tawe, Swansea, UK
- Coordinates: 51.6182°N 3.9340°W
- Home water: River Tawe
- Founded: 1970s, 2004 (refounded)
- Affiliations: Welsh Amateur Rowing Association
- Website: swanseauniversityrowingclub.com

Notable members
- James Roberts

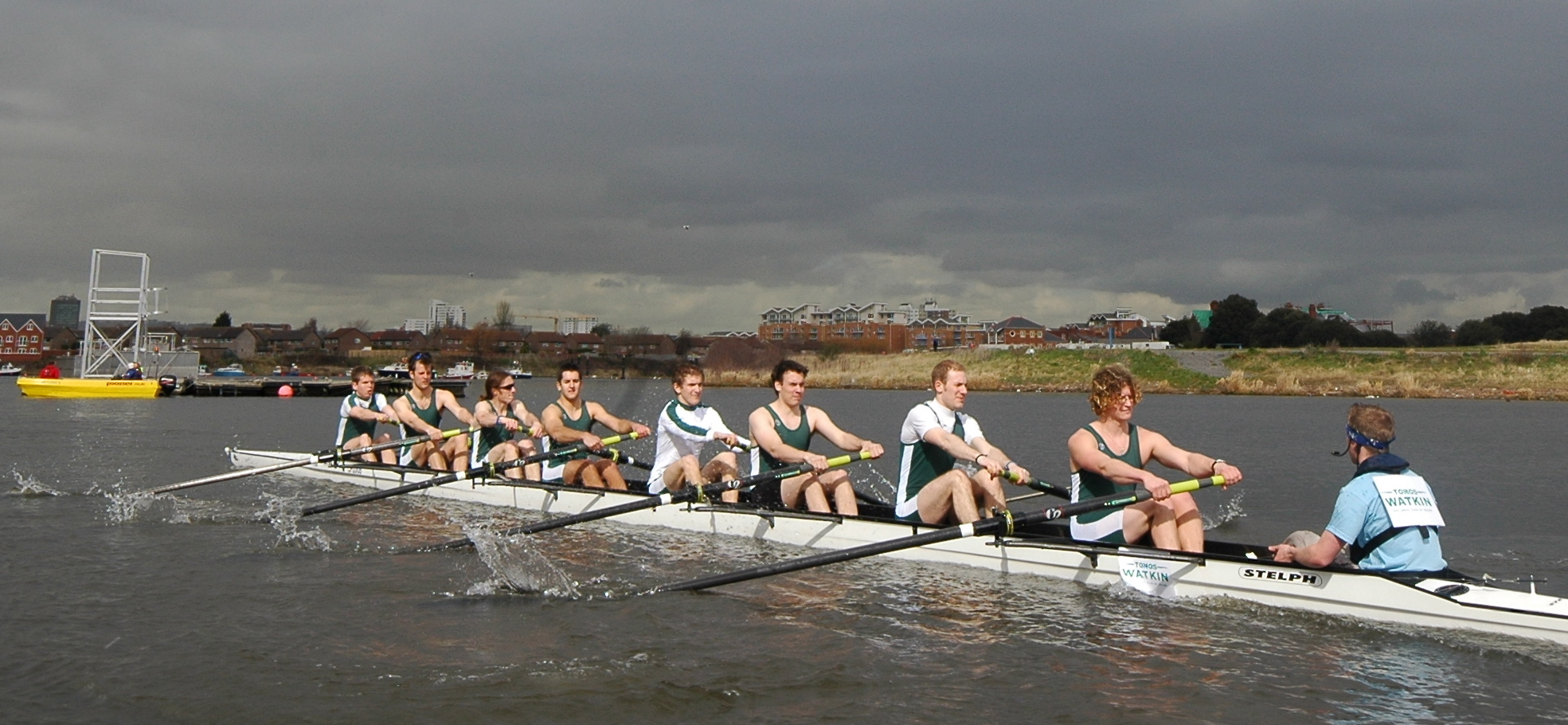
SURC Senior Men on the River Taff after the WBR 2006

The Swansea University Rowing Club (SURC) is the rowing club of Swansea University, Wales, and is situated on the west bank of the River Tawe in Swansea. It is unknown when the club was founded, but was re-founded in 2004. Rowing with SURC is open to all members of Sport Swansea, who provide a nominal level of funding and insurance for all university clubs.

Along with Cardiff University Boat Club

== Location ==
The club trains on the River Tawe and enjoys almost exclusive use of the 3 km of rowable water, with two long straight sections. Land-based training takes place at the University Sports Centre, along the seafront and sometimes on the beach in Swansea Bay itself.

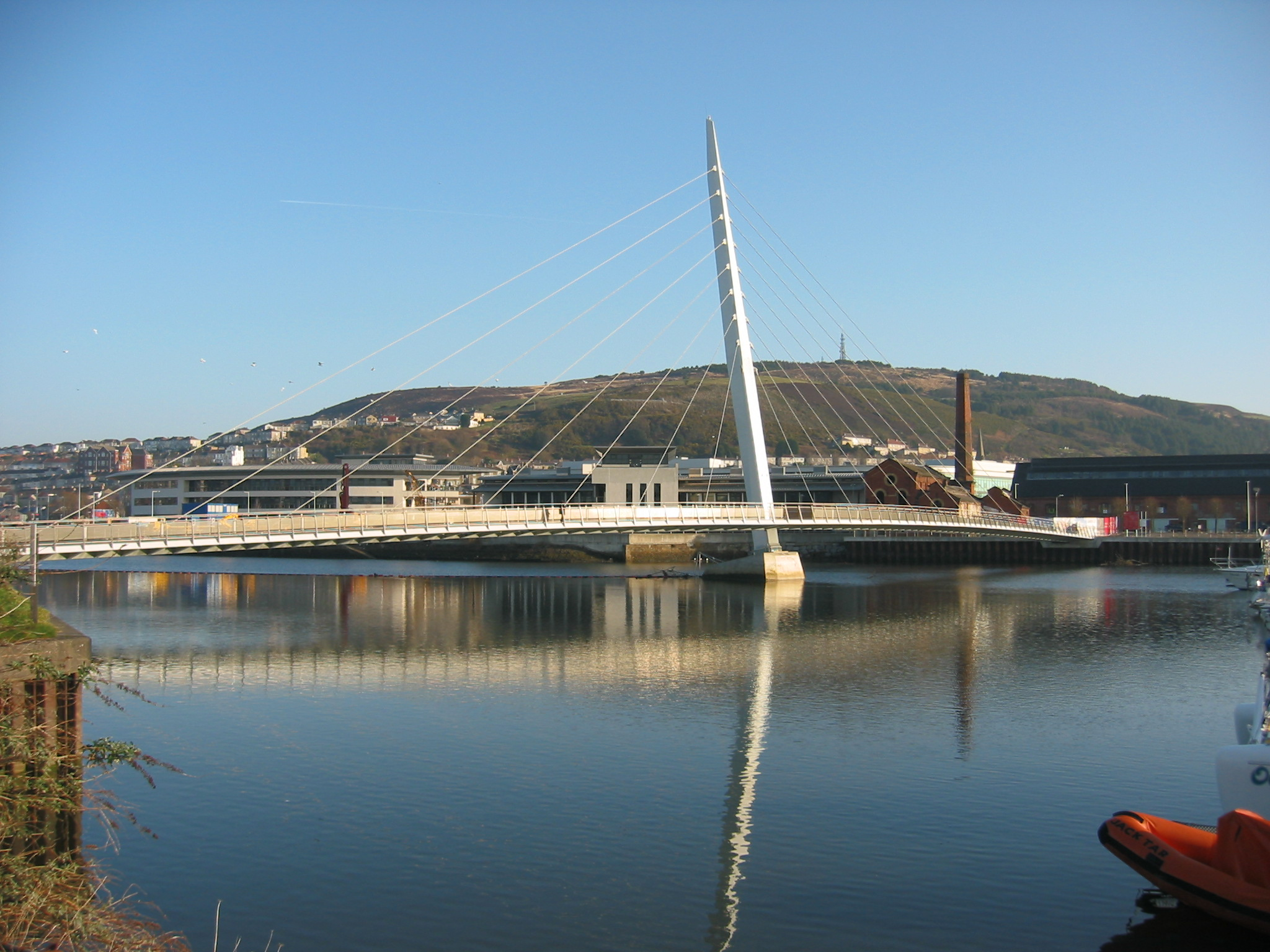
View of the Sail Bridge over the River Tawe from SURC trailer area

Although the club has few of its own facilities due to the extensive redevelopment along the river by Swansea City Council, the members use the facilities kindly provided by Swansea Yacht and Sub Aqua Club to launch and change. The Sail Bridge, with its 40m high mast, is one of the recent additions to the river, having been opened in 2003.

== Competition ==
The club competes at a number of regattas and head races throughout the academic year (September – August). Before Christmas, the club sends its senior crews to Cardiff Small Boats Head and thereafter tries to send all crews to the Welsh Indoor Championships and Bristol Head Race. These events provide the 'fresher' crews with some initial race experience. Senior crews will sometimes compete at the Fours head of the River Race, held on the Tideway in November.

After Christmas, the club enters a number of events during the season for head races. These include Cardiff Head of the Taff, BUCS Head Race (often on the Trent), Women's Eights Head of the River Race and the Head of the River Race, the last two of these being held on the Tideway.

The Welsh Boat Race is the main training focus before the BUCS Regatta, the start of the "regatta season", where Swansea University Rowing Club race Cardiff University Boat Club side-by-side along a set distance on either the River Taff or the River Tawe.

== History ==
The club was started in the 1970s and closed in the early 1980s. Since then Will Edmondson and his sister Anne-Marie restarted the club by breaking into the shed and getting out the old boats in 1989. They were helped by Andrew Williams (of Mumbles ARC). Rob Jones joined the club at the end of 1989 and the club set about buying some kit. Will Garnier was President, Rob Jones was secretary and after a bit of work, they got an eight out for the Head of the River Race and raced at various events including Reading Town where they reached the final of the Senior 2 event. At this stage there were about 25 racing members and had a huge social section with parties at their boathouse on the Cwm Lleidi (Swiss Valley reservoir) reservoir near Llanelli. The President and Secretary looked into moving the club to the River Tawe by the Morfa Stadium and secured a small space to keep boats there. The club dissolved around 1995 and did not start again until 2004. In that time, the stadium had been demolished, with a number of university boats going with it.

The club was revived in 2004 by Tim Stickley, who found just one river-worthy boat in a shed by the university playing fields. An area was organised in the car park next to the River Tawe on which to put the club trailer and permission obtained from Swansea Yacht and Sub Aqua Club to use their slipway to launch. Membership has increased dramatically and the club's fleet of boats has grown over subsequent years, with different captains bringing new things to the club, notably a training camp and The Welsh Boat Race under Henry Hilsdon, a new trailer under Sophie Clarke-Hackston (club captain for 2 years) and a first boat race win under Jenny Staight. Club captains since then have been Steven Gray and Ania Negele. In more recent years the club has gone from strength to strength. Moving from a social club to a performance based club. With help from Welsh Rowing and the university, SURC has purchased a number of new racing shells for the fleet, allowing the expanding membership to perform at the highest level they can. Membership numbers from the 2014/15 season are around 80–100 members, both performance and social. Between 2013 and 2017 a number of new racing shells and equipment were sourced by the then club presidents, allowing the purchase of high end equipment for the first time in the club's history.

== Alumni and members ==
The club has produced Paralympic and World Championship finalist rowers such as James Roberts. Also from SURC have been Welsh International rowers Daniel John, Kate Evans, Edward Hares and Aidan Thompson. Dan John won the coxless four event at the 2009 Home International Regatta. Kate Evans also placed 2nd at 2009 BUCS regatta in the women's lightweight singles event, and represented British Universities at the European Universities regatta.

== Tawe Phoenix Boat Club ==
In 2010 the Tawe Phoenix Boat Club was set up as an alumni club. It is affiliated with British Rowing and hopes to provide a name to race under for members who are continuing the Swansea spirit. The club aims to support the interests of Swansea University Rowing Club, to enter some races and to meet up socially at various points throughout each year.

== Committee ==
=== 2025-26 Committee ===
President: (England) Oliver Christie

Treasurer: (England) Ben Norfolk

Secretary: (England) Lydia Hunter-Tod

Boatman: (England) Eunae Charlton-Harrison

Coxes Captain: (England) Edward Norris

Senior Men Captain: (England) Angus Morris

Novice Men Captain: (England) Louis Baker

Senior Women Captain: (Fiji) Frances Katirewa

Novice Women Captains: (Wales) (England) Selina Jones, Edward Norris & Eunae Charlton-Harrison

Social Secretary: (England) Henry King

Media and Alumni: (Wales) Selina Jones

Kit Secretary: (England) Hugh Tobin

=== 2024-25 Committee ===
President: (England) Magnus Leighton

Treasurer: (England) Ben Norfolk

Secretary: (England) Phoebe Bennett Hobbs

Boatmen: (England) Daniel Bates

Coxes Captain: (England) Arlo Bond

Senior Men Captain: (England) Oscar Whitcombe

Novice Men Captain: (England) Tomas McNally

Senior Women Captain: (England) Amelie Hamilton

Novice Women Captain: (Fiji) Frances Katirewa

Social Secretary: (England) Emma Thomas

Kit, Media and Alumni: (England) Ruby Mcclelland

=== 2023-24 Committee ===
President: (England) Freya Moxham

Treasurer: (England) Alexander Cairney

Secretary: (England) Magnus Leighton

Boatmen: (England) Connor Noyes

Coxes Captain: (England) Thomas Hughes

Senior Men Captain: (Wales) Ben Morgan

Novice Men Captain: (England) Joseph Ord

Senior Women Captain: (Northern Ireland) Jenny Little

Novice Women Captain: (England) Molly Newman

Social Secretary: (England) William Heywood

Kit and Media Officer: (England) Willem Bartlett

== See also ==
- University rowing in the United Kingdom
- British Universities and Colleges Sport
- Tawe Phoenix Boat Club
