= De Montfort University Rowing Club =

Rowing club of De Montfort University in England

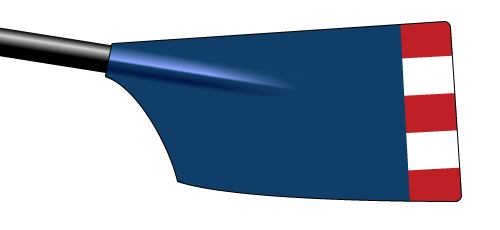
- Location: Leicester
- Coordinates: 52.62489°N 1.143643°W
- Home water: River Soar
- Founded: 1992
- Membership: 80 (approx)
- Affiliations: De Montfort University; British Rowing

Events
- T-shirt Run (Nov); Varsity of Leicester (Mar); The DMURC Ball (Mar/Apr); The DMURC Old Blades Regatta (May)

De Montfort University Rowing Club (DMURC) is the rowing club of De Montfort University, Leicester, and is situated on the city canalised section of the River Soar. The club was founded in 1992 when Leicester Polytechnic changed to De Montfort University during the Further and Higher Education Act 1992.

== History ==
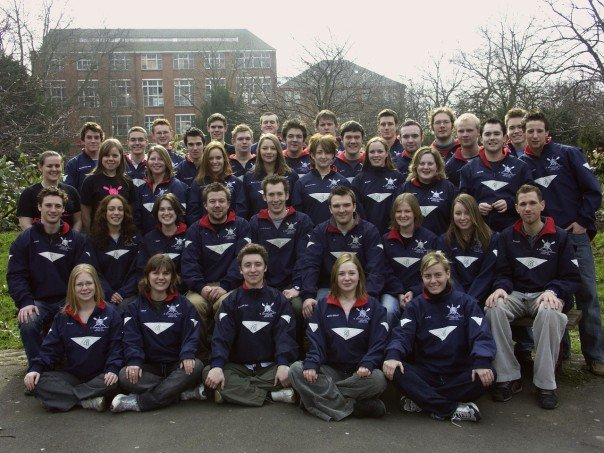
DMURC Club Photo, 2004–2005

DMURC has fluctuated in size through its years currently standing at about 80–90 members; in 2007 the club size was at about 25–30 members.

The club has always had a close association with both Leicester Rowing Club and its university rival, the University of Leicester Boat Club. A report from 1997 states that De Montfort University contributed £10,000 of partnership funding towards the building of Leicester Rowing Clubs boathouse, this gave the opportunity for the university to store 4 coxed fours and one eight for their squads to use. There have been DMURC / Leicester RC composite boats in the past (Women's 8+, WEHORR, 1996).

In the future the club plans to continue to grow acquiring more support each year from DMU Athletics Union due to improving success and progression.

== Competition ==
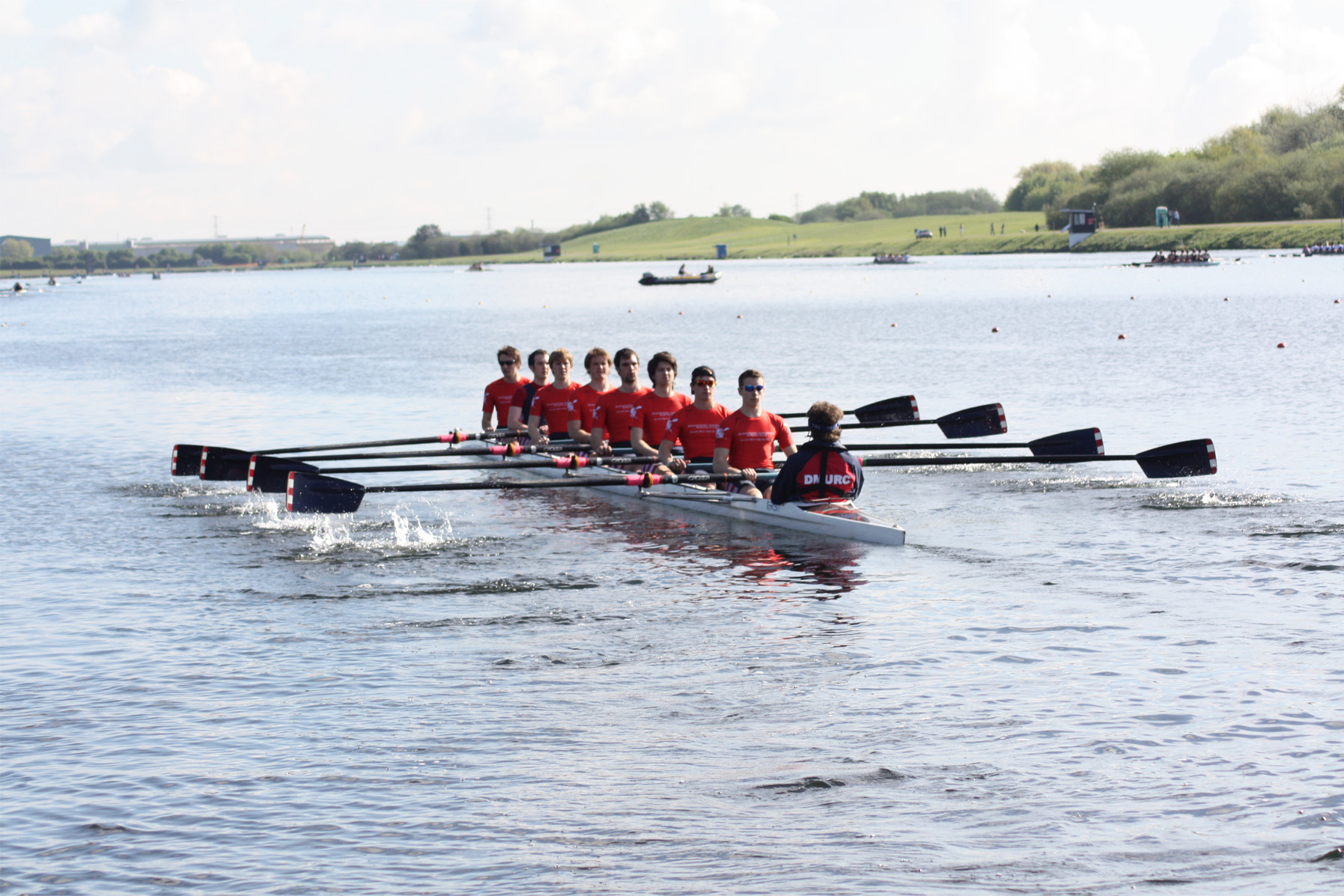
Senior Men's 8+ making their way to some heats at BUCS Regatta 2010

There are a few annual regattas that the rowing club has frequented over the last 10 years, these mainly include Monmouth Regatta, BUCS Regatta, Peterborough Regatta, Ironbridge Regatta and especially Shrewsbury Regatta.

Shrewsbury Regatta – The club has competed at Shrewsbury Regatta for nearly 10 years and DMURC have a close relationship with Pengwern Boat Club who organise the regatta.

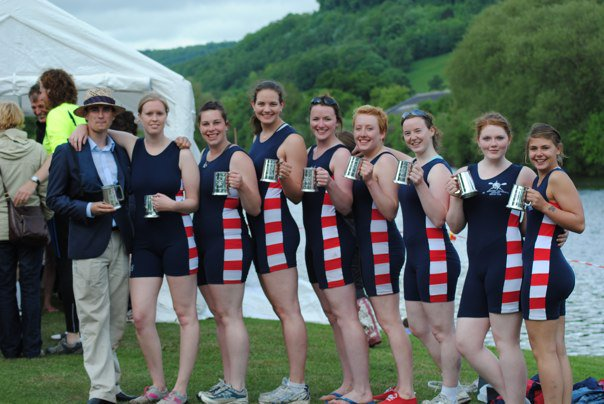
Senior Women's 8+ after winning at Monmouth Regatta 2010

BUCS Regatta – DMURC competes at the British Universities Regatta every year, entering freshmen and seniors. Notable performances over the last few years include a beginner women's coxed four reaching the semi-finals in 2012 and an intermediate men's coxed four reaching the semi-finals in 2009.

== Club colours ==
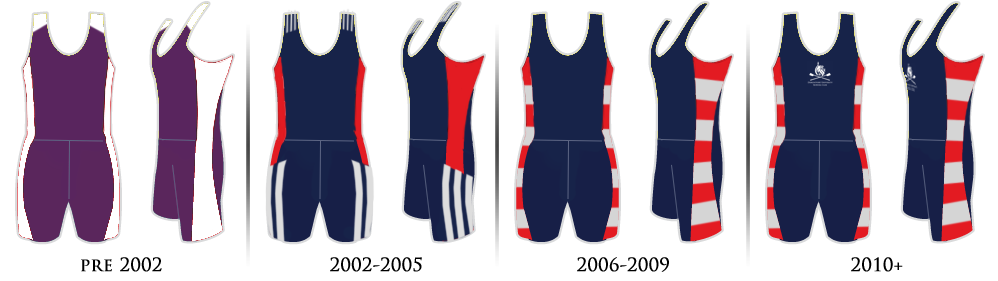
DMURC All In Ones; A comparison of DMURC All In Ones from pre-2002 to 2010+

DMURC has had many different styles of kit over the years, ranging from tech tops to all in ones. Not only have the garments themselves changed but also the colours. Post 2002 the colours have been consistently: main, Navy / secondary, Red & White; this deviates from the more common De Montfort University sports team colours of black and red.

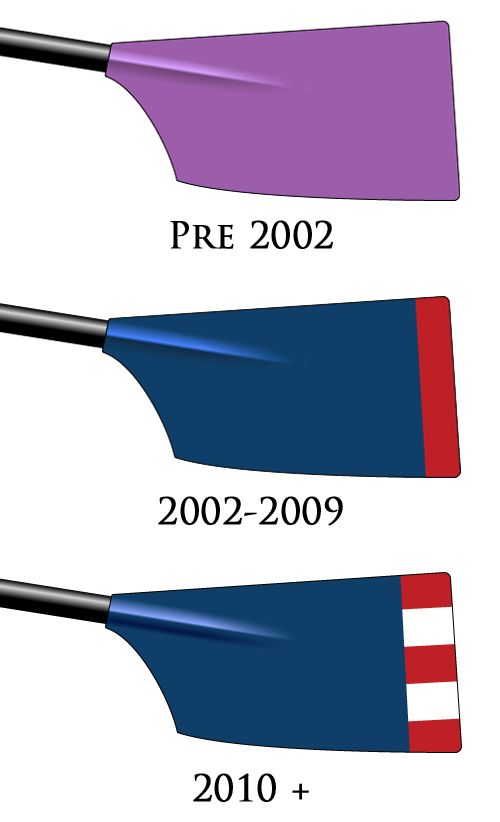
DMURC blade history; A comparison of DMURC Blade colours from pre‑2002 to 2010+

The DMURC blade colours closely follow the all in one design through the years it has progressed. Prior to 2002 the club blades have been seen in photos at Holme Pierrepont in a solid purple colour, the same as the first all in one. It is presumed that the change from purple and white to navy, red and white was made because there were a few other clubs with the same colours including Durham University Boat Club, University of London Boat Club and Reading University Boat Club.

The club then changed the blade colours to navy with a red tip. As the students were painting the blades themselves this was a practical design as the colours were easy to get hold of and the design could be replicated without difficulty. The club raced with these blades until late 2009 when Louis Watson, Phil Reilly and Joe Brunton decided to re-paint the main set of oars (they were becoming gradually more scratched) but changed the red tip to red and white squares to match the all in one design, these are the blade colours the club races with today.
