= The Welsh Boat Race =

University rowing competition in Wales

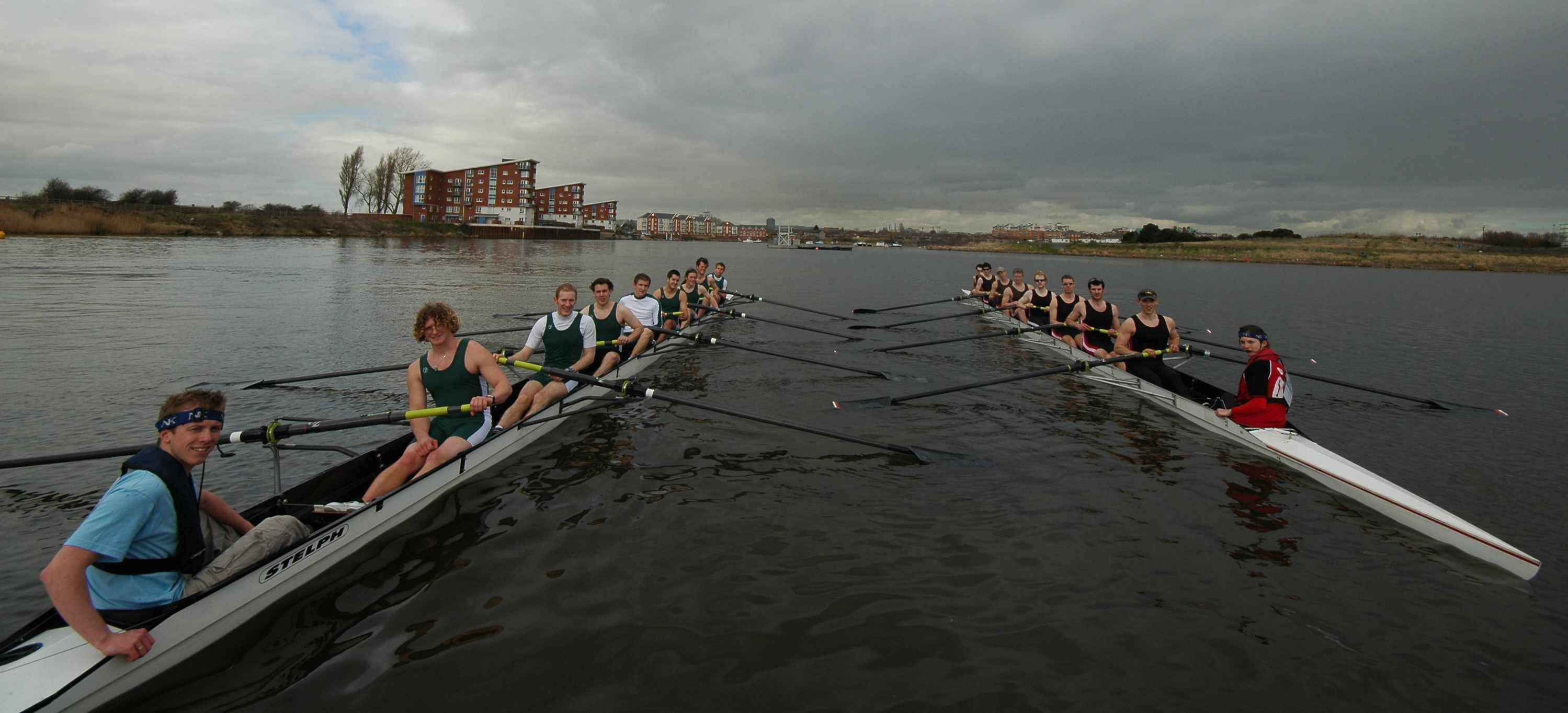
Swansea and Cardiff Universities Men's Senior eights in 2006

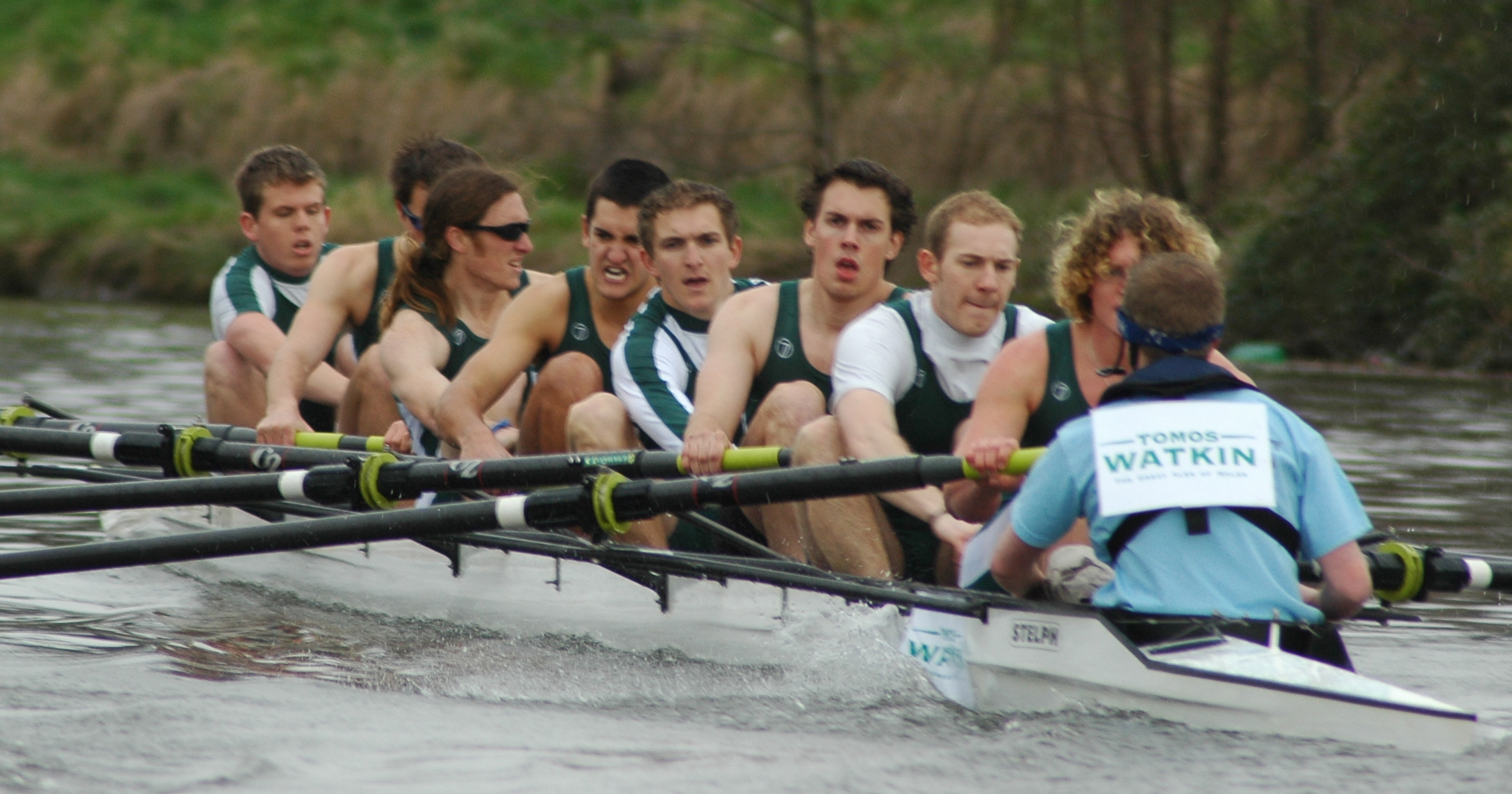
Swansea University Men's Senior eight in 2006

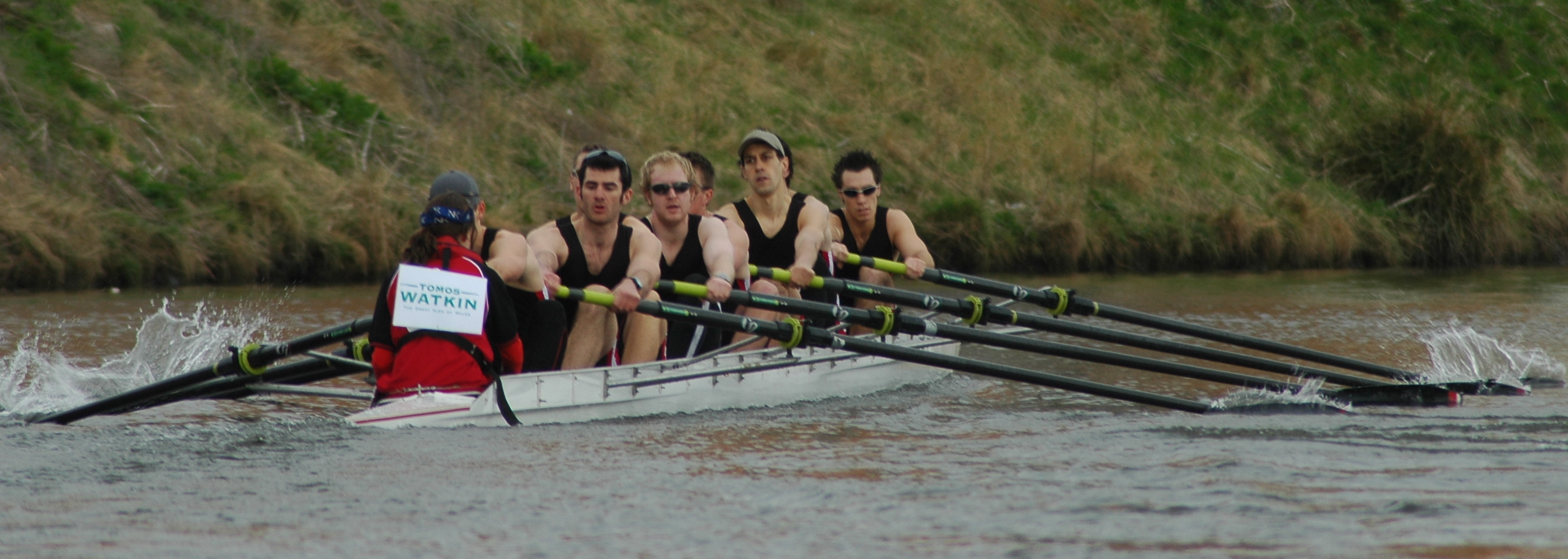
Cardiff University Men's Senior eight in 2006

The Welsh Boat Race, also known as the Welsh University Boat Race and The Welsh Varsity Boat Race, is an annual rowing race in Wales between the Swansea University Rowing Club and the Cardiff University Rowing Club, rowed between competing eights each spring since 2006 on the River Tawe or River Taff in South Wales.

== Background ==
The Welsh Boat Race started in 2006. with just a senior men's and women's event and as popularity grew for the event and particularly the Swansea University Rowing Club grew in numbers (having been recently reinstated), a Novice event was added for both men and women in their first year of rowing.

The race was held on a Wednesday, to complement the Welsh Varsity event and continued this way until 2009. It was then moved to a weekend date to enable more people to attend.

The 2010 Welsh Boat Race was held on the River Tawe, in Swansea on Saturday 24 April. The aim was to alternate the venue between the two university rivers, but with superior facilities in Cardiff, it was the venue of choice for 4 years. It was again held on the River Tawe, Swansea, in 2015 and 2016, the event returning to the River Taff, Cardiff in 2017.

For the first time, in 2017 Swansea won the overall series of Welsh Varsity Boat Races. This feat was repeated in 2024, 2025 and 2026.

The 2020 and 2021 Welsh Varsity Boat Races were cancelled due to the COVID-19 pandemic

== Winners ==
=== Men's race ===
- 2006 - Cardiff
- 2007 - Cardiff
- 2008 - Cardiff
- 2009 - Swansea
- 2010 - Swansea
- 2011 - Cardiff
- 2012 - Cardiff
- 2013 - Cardiff
- 2014 - Swansea
- 2015 - Swansea
- 2016 - Swansea
- 2017 - Swansea
- 2018 - Swansea
- 2019 - Swansea
- 2020 - No race
- 2021 - No race
- 2022 - Swansea
- 2023 - Swansea
- 2024 - Swansea
- 2025 - Swansea
- 2026 - Swansea

Number of wins
Cardiff	Swansea
6	13

=== Women's race ===
- 2006 - Cardiff
- 2007 - Cardiff
- 2008 - Cardiff
- 2009 - Cardiff
- 2010 - Cardiff
- 2011 - Cardiff
- 2012 - Cardiff
- 2013 - Cardiff
- 2014 - Cardiff
- 2015 - Cardiff
- 2016 - Cardiff
- 2017 - Cardiff
- 2018 - Cardiff
- 2019 - Cardiff
- 2020 - No race
- 2021 - No race
- 2022 - Cardiff
- 2023 - Cardiff
- 2024 - Cardiff
- 2025 - Cardiff
- 2026 - Swansea

Number of wins
Cardiff	Swansea
18	1

=== Men's novices race ===
- 2006 - No race
- 2007 - No race
- 2008 - No race
- 2009 - Cardiff
- 2010 - Cardiff
- 2011 - Cardiff
- 2012 - Swansea
- 2013 - Cardiff
- 2014 - Cardiff
- 2015 - Cardiff
- 2016 - Cardiff
- 2017 - Swansea
- 2018 - Swansea
- 2019 - Cardiff
- 2020 - No race
- 2021 - No race
- 2022 - Cardiff
- 2023 - Swansea
- 2024 - Swansea
- 2025 - Swansea
- 2026 - Swansea

Number of wins
Cardiff	Swansea
9	7

=== Women's novices race ===
- 2006 - No race
- 2007 - No race
- 2008 - No race
- 2009 - Cardiff
- 2010 - Cardiff
- 2011 - Cardiff
- 2012 - Cardiff
- 2013 - Cardiff
- 2014 - Cardiff
- 2015 - Cardiff
- 2016 - Cardiff
- 2017 - Swansea
- 2018 - Cardiff
- 2019 - Cardiff
- 2020 - No race
- 2021 - No race
- 2022 - Cardiff
- 2023 - Cardiff
- 2024 - Swansea
- 2025 - Swansea
- 2026 - Swansea

Number of wins
Cardiff	Swansea
12	4

Wales First Minister, Rhodri Morgan, was guest presenter in 2009.

== Course ==
The course was rowed on the lower reaches of the River Taff from south of the Railway Arches bridge to Cardiff Bay over approximately 2 kilometres. In 2010 the venue changed to the River Tawe's slightly straighter course of again approximately 2 km from the beginning of the straight below White Rock near the old Hafod Copperworks to the Sail Bridge, returning in 2015, 2016, 2018, 2022 and 2024. After 2010 (with the exception of 2015/16) it returned to the River Taff. The course length is restricted due to the available rivers in the South Wales region.

The current trend is to now host the Boat Race in the city where all the Varsity matches are taking place the weekend before Varsity Wednesday.

The race is designed to give rowers a good preparation for the shorter distance regatta season.

- 2006 - River Taff (Cardiff)
- 2007 - River Taff (Cardiff)
- 2008 - River Taff (Cardiff)
- 2009 - River Taff (Cardiff)
- 2010 - River Tawe (Swansea)
- 2011 - River Taff (Cardiff)
- 2012 - River Taff (Cardiff)
- 2013 - River Taff (Cardiff)
- 2014 - River Taff (Cardiff)
- 2015 - River Tawe (Swansea)
- 2016 - River Tawe (Swansea)
- 2017 - River Taff (Cardiff)
- 2018 - River Tawe (Swansea)
- 2019 - River Taff (Cardiff)
- 2020 - Cancelled due to the COVID-19 pandemic
- 2021 - Cancelled due to the COVID-19 pandemic
- 2022 - River Tawe (Swansea)
- 2023 - River Taff (Cardiff)
- 2024 - River Tawe (Swansea)
- 2025 - River Taff (Cardiff)
- 2026 - River Taff (Cardiff)

== See also ==
- List of British and Irish varsity matches
- Scottish Boat Race
- The Boat Race
- The Boat Race of the North
- University rowing in the United Kingdom
- Welsh Amateur Rowing Association
- Welsh Varsity
