= Worldwide Roar (organization) =

Non-profit mental health organization

The Worldwide Roar
- Predecessor: Warwick Rowers
- Formation: 2009
- Founder: Angus Malcolm
- Type: Non-profit organization
- Legal status: Active
- Purpose: Promoting healthier masculinity for social change, LGBTQ+ rights, gender equality, and ending structural racism.
- Region served: International
- Products: Annual calendar
- Services: Advocacy, fundraising, awareness campaigns
- Fields: Mental health, LGBTQ+ rights, gender equality, anti-racism
- Official language: English
- Leader: Angus Malcolm
- Subsidiaries: Sport Allies (funded by Worldwide Roar)
- Funding: Sales of calendar, donations
- Award: UK Charity Calendar of the Year (2 times)
- Formerly called: Warwick Rowers

The Worldwide Roar (formerly Warwick Rowers) is a mental-health project and a non-profit organisation dedicated to promoting healthier masculinity for social change.

The project began by tackling homophobia in sport through the use of sport-based male nudity. It has since broadened its scope to promote healthier masculinity as a route to LGBTQ+ rights, gender equality and ending structural racism.

== History ==
In 2009, Worldwide Roar (then known as Warwick Rowers) was initiated by Angus Malcolm, who later founded registered charity Sport Allies, as a sports-based advocacy program. Malcolm is an LBGTQ activist who created a naked calendar featuring straight sportsmen as a direct challenge to homophobia in sporting culture. Initially, profits from sales went to funding the rowing club at the University of Warwick.

Since 2009, the project has become popular among the LGBTQ+ community and celebrity fans. In 2014, the project funded and supported the development of Sport Allies, a registered charity focused on making sport a leader in promoting diversity and inclusion.

In October 2017, the Sport Allies charity was nominated for the European Diversity Awards. Over the years, the project has received global recognition as a gay/straight alliance and advocacy for LBGTQ+ inclusion, social equality and related charitable fundraising initiatives.

The organisation is known for its charity fundraising annual calendar. It has been voted two times the "United Kingdom's Charity Calendar of the year" along with other national calendar awards.

In 2019, Worldwide Roar funded Sport Allies' collaboration with the London Film School and SKY Sports to create three "Spotlight" short films, a new series about sports inclusion.

In 2019, Worldwide Roar celebrated the tenth anniversary of its calendar with a centrefold of Robbie Manson, the LGBTQ+ world cup champion, world-record holder as fastest rower, and two-time Olympic athlete. By 2019, the project had garnered over 200,000 followers on Instagram.

In 2019, Warwick Rowers was internationally rebranded as Worldwide Roar. After launching an international appeal for help, organisations like British Rowing and Sport England supported the organisation with recruitment of more diverse men from different sports.

In April 2020, Worldwide Roar provided entertainment via social media and newsletters as a measure to sustain morale during COVID-19.

== Charitable work ==
Worldwide Roar funds Sport Allies, a registered charity working to promote inclusion and combat homophobia that receives all the profits of Worldwide Roar. By 2020, the organisation had received over £100,000 or US$129,000 in donations from the Worldwide Roar project.

== Controversy ==
Their calendar was banned in Russia for featuring nude poses of men and gay propaganda in 2018.

In 2016, YouTube temporarily suspended the organisation's channel.

Worldwide Roar posts images within Instagram's published guidelines on occasions including International Day Against Homophobia and Transphobia, LGBT Pride and International Women’s Day. Problems began when Instagram deleted some of its posts due to an alleged breach of community guidelines. On 26 May 2018, Worldwide Roar's Instagram account was deleted without warning for breaching Instagram's nudity policy. Instagram apologized for removing the account in error and restored the account as it did not breach any of Instagram's nudity policies.

== Achievements ==
Worldwide Roar has been voted two times as the "United Kingdom's Charity Calendar of the year".
