= St Hilda's College Boat Club =

British rowing club

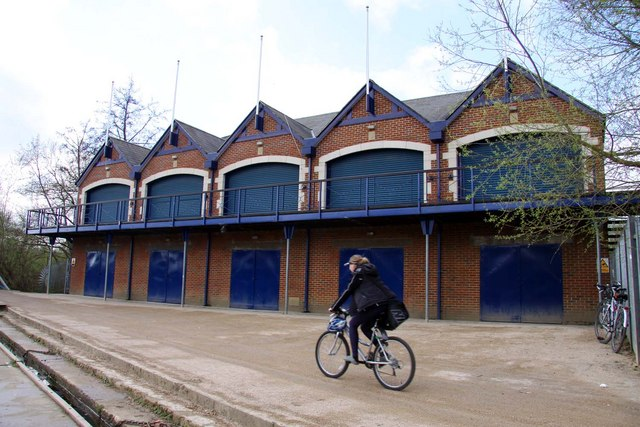

- St Hilda's College Boat Club colours, Longbridges Boathouse, and the club's blade pattern
- Location: Longbridges Boathouse
- Coordinates: 51°44′19.3″N 1°14′47.0″W
- Home water: The Isis
- Founded: 1890s
- Key people: Rhys Williams (President); Adam Wood (Open Side Captain); (Australia) Flora Gillies (Women's Side Captain); Emily Blatch(Captain of Coxes); Jack Davies (OURCs Sabbatical Officer); Chris Wood (Senior Member)
- University: University of Oxford
- Colours
- Affiliations: British Rowing (boat code SHI); Peterhouse BC (Sister college)
- Website: hildasrowing.co.uk

St Hilda's College Boat Club (SHCBC) is the rowing club for members of St Hilda's College, Oxford. It is based at Longbridges Boathouse and trains on the Isis stretch of the River Thames. The club competes primarily in the Torpids and Summer Eights bumps races in Oxford.

== History ==
=== Pioneers of women's rowing ===
SHCBC was one of the first Oxford colleges to have women rowing on the Thames and the first to field a women's 8+ boat. Its boat club was founded soon after the college's creation, between 1893-96, and its members first rowed in an 8+ in 1911. It was St Hilda's student H.G. Wanklyn who formed OUWBC and coxed in the inaugural Women's Boat Race of 1927, with five Hilda's rowers. In 1969, the St Hilda's Eight made Oxford history when they became the first ever female crew to row in the Summer Eights.

In the 1980s, Hilda's rowers Alison Gill and Pauline Janson were Olympians.

=== Recent years ===
After 1976, the Women's 1st VIII consistently competed in the first division of both the Torpids and Summer Eights competitions, placing second on the river in 1981. After the admittance of men to the college in 2008, performance declined and the crew is currently placed in division three of both competitions.

Since 2009 the men's boat has steadily climbed the Torpids and Summer Eights leagues, most recently reaching division three of Torpids in 2022 and remaining in division four of Summer Eights.

'Blades' have recently been achieved by the women's team in 2016, 2019 2023 and 2025, and by the men's team in 2013, 2016, 2017, 2018, 2022 and twice in 2025. In 2016, the men's first boat was bumped in their 28th Summer Eights race, for the first time.

== Honours ==
=== Boat Race representatives ===
The following rowers were part of the rowing club at the time of their participation in The Boat Race.

Men's boat race

Year	Name
1995	Abbie C. Chapman +

Women's boat race

Year	Name
2026	Emily Molins

Key

- + = coxswain

== See also ==
- Oxford University Rowing Clubs
