= Mansfield College Boat Club =

British rowing club

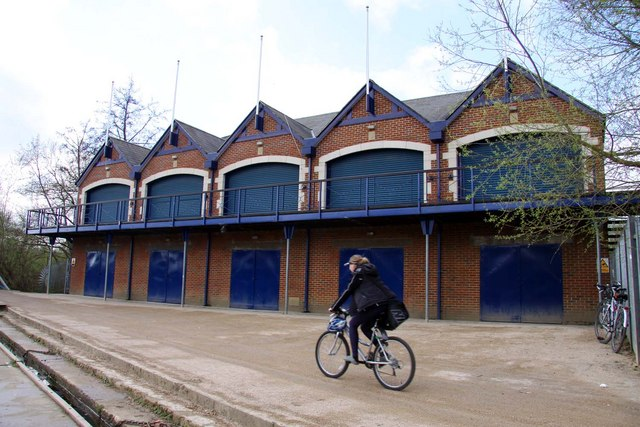

- Longbridges boathouse (shared with other colleges) and rowing blade colours
- Coordinates: 51.743503°N 1.249915°W
- Home water: River Thames
- Founded: 1965
- Key people: James Bennett (President); Mikey Matthews (Men's Captain); Lucy Lansdown (Women's Captain)
- University: University of Oxford
- Colours
- Affiliations: British Rowing (boat code MAN); Homerton College, Cambridge (Sister college)
- Website: mansfieldcollegeboatclub.co.uk

Mansfield College Boat Club (MCBC) is a rowing club for the members of Mansfield College, University of Oxford. Founded in 1965, the club is the largest sporting society at Mansfield College and offers all college members the opportunity to row, regardless of prior experience.

Established by a group of students led by Michael Mahony, the club continues to be run by Mansfield students, who comprise the Mansfield College Boat Club Committee. It is affiliated with Oxford University Rowing Clubs (OURCs).

MCBC is based on the Isis (Thames) and shares a club room and boat storage space with St Hilda's College Boat Club at the Longbridges Boat House, which opened in 1997.

== Results ==
The club fields an Open First VIII and a Women's First VIII in the annual inter-collegiate Torpids and Summer Eights bumps racing competitions. An Open Second VIII and a Women's Second VIII also tend to be entered in both competitions by the club.

In Torpids, the Mansfield W1 currently sits 22nd on the river (placing it in Division II of the competition), and the M1 sits 28th (placing it in Division III). In Summer Eights, the W1 sits 23rd on the river (placing it in Division II of the competition), and the M1 sits 27th (placing it in Division III).

MCBC crews have won blades - bumping the crew they were chasing every day without being bumped - in Torpids; 1991 (M1), 1996 (M1, W1), 2004 (W1), 2009 (M1), 2010 (W1), 2015 (M1, M2), 2016 (M1, W1), 2017 (M1, W2), 2019 (W2), 2023 (W1) and in Summer Eights; 1966 (M1), 1974 (M1), 1975 (M1), 1979 (M1), 1983 (M2), 1988 (W1), 1995 (M1, W1), 2000 (W1), 2003 (M1), 2007 (W1), 2008 (W1), 2009 (W1, M2), 2016 (W1, M2).

MCBC has also won miniature blades in Oxford City Bumps - an annual bumps racing event for coxed eights open to all rowing clubs, universities, colleges, and schools - by bumping in all four of the day's races without being bumped; 2024 (W1).

The club also tends to field an Open VIII and a Women's VIII in the Isis Winter League (IWL). The Isis Winter League is a series of head races run throughout Michaelmas and Hilary terms. IWLs are open not only to OURCs affiliated crews but also to other rowing clubs based on the Isis. The course usually runs from Donnington Bridge to Cox's Stone opposite Christ Church Meadow. In 2023, the Mansfield Women's VIII won the competition (winning both races where they received an official time), and the Open VIII placed 5th, meaning that the club placed second victor ludorum, out of 25 clubs.

== History ==
In 1986 Donald MacDonald became the first MCBC member to row in The Boat Race. The following year he was President of Oxford University Boat Club during the mutiny year of 1987, the events of which received publicity in the book True Blue: The Oxford Boat Race Mutiny and the film True Blue.

On 4 July 2005, Longbridges Boat House was the victim of an arson attack [Longbridges boathouse fire] which destroyed most of MCBC's equipment. However, the committee, college, and generous alumni rallied to replace the lost equipment, enabling the crews to continue moving up the bumps divisions.

The club has spawned multiple blues rowers including; Tiffancy-Alice Ewins (1997 Women's Lwt crew), Dan Harvey (2012) Jack Shuttleworth (2015 Lwt crew), Merel Lefferts (2016), and Ruby Mullin (2024 Women's Lwt crew).

While 2020 saw the cancellation of many rowing events due to flooding, high stream, and the COVID-19 pandemic, three Mansfield rowers were selected as part of the squads that would have raced on Boat Race Day. Moreover, the selection of Martha Birtles for the OUWBC blue boat and Caspar Jopling for the OUBC blue boat was a first in that both university openweight blue boats featured Mansfield rowers in the same year.

In 2023 Chris Jenkins OBE was elected as President of the Commonwealth Games Federation in 2023. He began rowing at Mansfield before representing Leander and Wales. He served as the CEO of Commonwealth Games Wales for 16 years.

Martha Birtles, who learnt to row at Mansfield, appeared in The Boat Race 2025 and represented Great Britain in the 2025 European Rowing Championships, winning gold in the women's 8+ and bronze in the women's 4-.

== Honours ==
=== Boat Race representatives ===
The following rowers were part of the rowing club at the time of their participation in The Boat Race.

Men's boat race

| Year | Name |
|---|---|
| 1986 | Donald H. M. Macdonald |
| 1987 | Donald H. M. Macdonald |
| 1995 | Jonathan R. W. Kawaja |
| 2012 | Dan Harvey |
| 2024 | Lenny Jenkins |

Women's boat race

| Year | Name |
|---|---|
| 2017 | Emily Cameron |
| 2021 | Martha Birtles |
