= Swiss Valley Reservoir =

Reservoir in Carmarthenshire, Wales

Swiss Valley reservoir
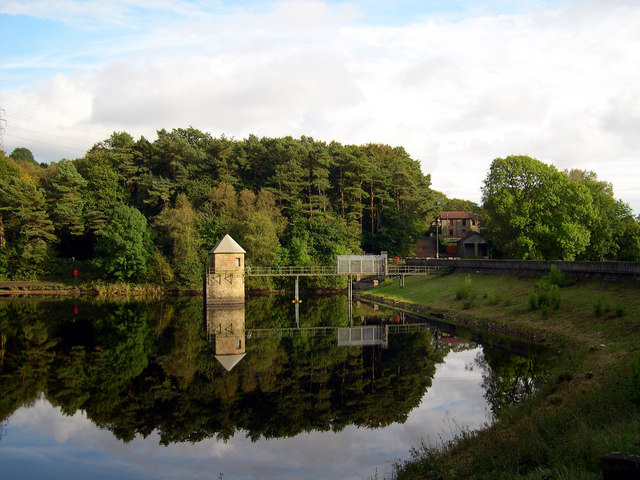
- Filter tower on lower Lliedi Reservoir

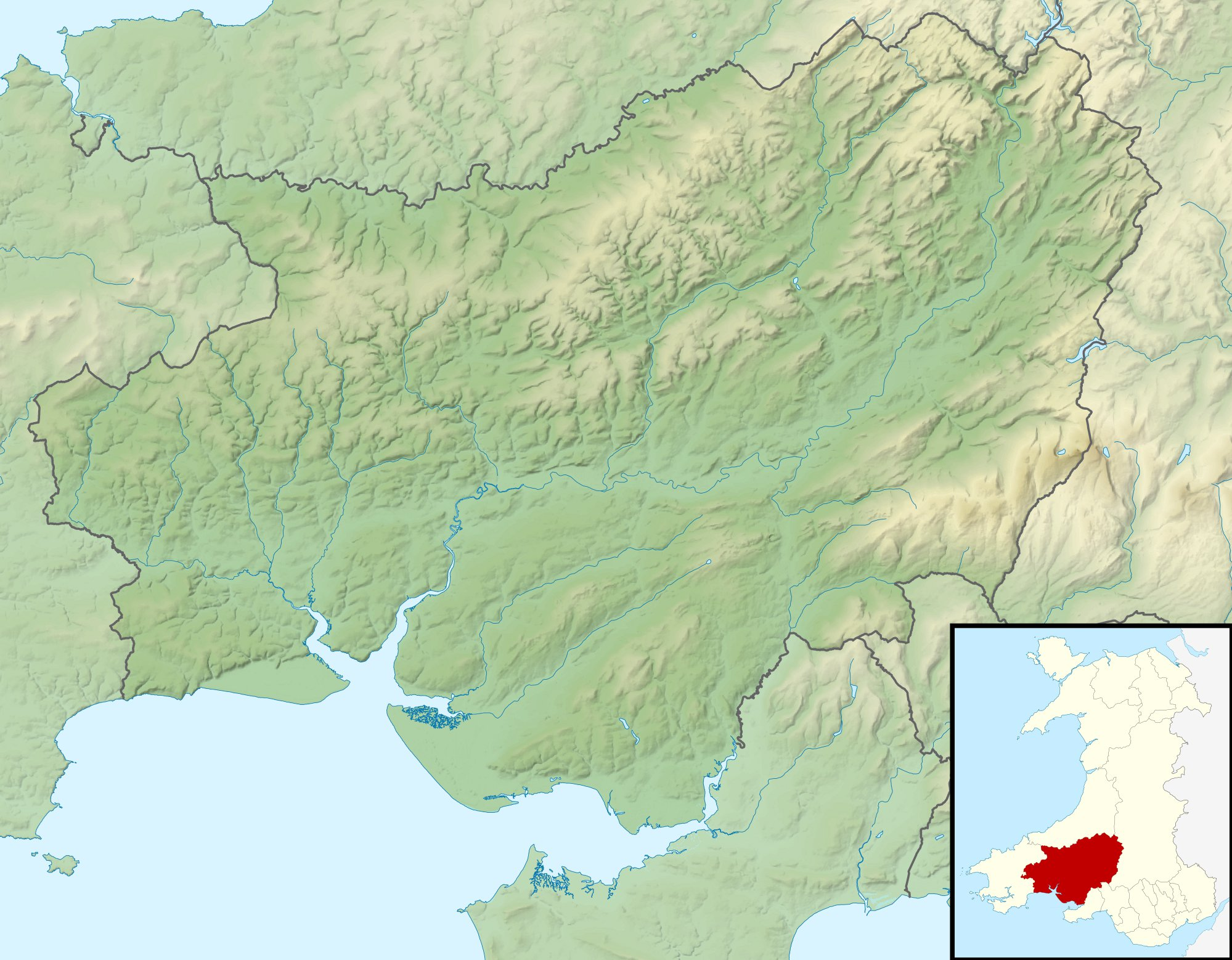
- Location within Carmarthenshire
- Location: Wales
- Coordinates: 51°42′55″N 4°9′5″W
- Type: reservoir
- Basin countries: United Kingdom

Swiss Valley Reservoir, also known as Upper Lliedi reservoir and Lower Lliedi reservoir, feeds water to the towns of Llanelli and Llannon. It gets the water from the River Lliedi.

The Swiss Valley Cycle Route, which forms part of National Cycle Route 47, itself part of the Celtic Trail), passes Swiss Valley Reservoir on a traffic free path between Llanelli and Cross Hands.
