= Torpids =

Series of rowing races at the University of Oxford

- Head of the River
Wolfson Men	Pembroke Women
Highest 2^{nd} Torpid (Men)	Wolfson (Division III)
Highest 2^{nd} Torpid (Women)	Wolfson (Division III)
Course	Isis (upstream)
Course length	c. 1800m
- Note: Last Torpids 26^{th} February – 1^{st} March 2025
- OURCs – Torpids

Torpids is one of two series of bumping races, a type of rowing race, held yearly at Oxford University; the other is Eights Week. More than 130 men's and women's crews race for their colleges in twelve divisions: six each of men's and women's; almost 1,200 participants in total. The racing takes place on the Isis (part of the River Thames), usually in the 7th week of Hilary Term on four successive days from Wednesday to Saturday (around the start of March).

== Overview ==
Bumping races evolved in Oxford as the river is too narrow for normal side by side racing. Competing crews start the race lined up in order, one behind another, with their coxes holding ropes ('bung lines') attached to the bank, with gaps of about 1.5 boat lengths between the bow of one boat and the stern of the one in front. Racing is started by the firing of a cannon. Racing is by division, the number of crews in a division depending on river conditions. The bottom men's division starts first with men's and women's alternating, finishing with the top women's division.

Crews attempt to progress up their division by hitting ('bumping') the boat in front without being hit by the boat behind, with the ultimate aim of becoming "Head of the River" i.e. top of the first division. The Head of the River is awarded the Torpids Challenge Cup, presented to the OUBC by President T.C. Edwards-Moss of Brasenose College Boat Club. Once a bump has taken place, the crew whose boat was bumped has to continue racing (and is liable to be bumped again) whilst the bumping crew moves to the side. This can lead to a crew moving down several places during a day's racing. This is the principal difference in the rules between Torpids and Summer Eights, where both crews stop racing. Commonly a cox will concede a bump, signalled by raising an arm, rather than waiting to be hit. The crew finishing top of a lower division rows again the same day at the bottom of the division above. The 1978 St Johns second Torpid crew achieved 13 bumps over 4 days of racing as evidenced in https://eodg.atm.ox.ac.uk/user/dudhia/rowing/bumps/e1978/ - this is a record as far as is currently known.

The name 'Torpids' derives from the event's origins as a race for the second boats of the colleges, which were of course slower than the first boats. The status of the event – still adjudged below that of Summer Eights on account of the absence of rowers in the Varsity boat races – only began to rise at the very end of the nineteenth century, when colleges began to form first boats to compete. Nowadays there is no limit on the number of boats a college may enter, although crews in the last two divisions and crews without a position have to qualify to race by competing in a timed race the preceding Friday, known as 'rowing on'.

Athletes competing in that year's Boat Race, Women's Boat Race or any of the Lightweight University crews at Henley Boat Races may not compete in Torpids, but may compete in Summer Eights.

=== Double Headship ===
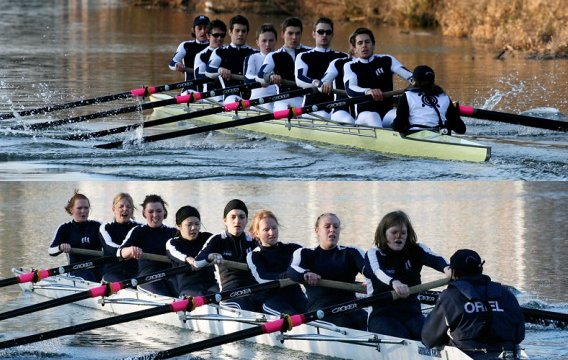
The double headship winning Oriel Men's and Women's Eights crews in 2006.

The "Double Headship" is an accolade of any college finishing with their men's and women's crews at the "Head of the River". Oriel is the first to have achieved this in Torpids, in 2006. The college's new first crews repeated this in 2018.

=== Trophies ===
The first day's starting order is based on the previous year's finishing positions, and each subsequent day's starting order is based on the previous day's finishing positions. A crew that bumps on every day or that finishes at the Head of the River is awarded blades – the right to get trophy oars painted up in their college colours with the names and weights of the successful crew emblazoned on them. Spoons are awarded in case the crew was bumped on every single day. A third, somewhat unusual possibility is the award of spades. The crew is both bumped and then proceeds to bump a crew in front of it before the end of the race. Thus being both the bumper and the bumped on the same day. Owing to the differences in rules between Torpids and Lent Bumps at the University of Cambridge this achievement is only possible at Oxford.

== Head of the River – Summary table ==
Blade	College	Headships			Longest time held		Last Headship	
Blade	College	Men	Women	Total	Men	Women	Men	Women
Oriel College Boat Club	Oriel	36	3	39	1972–90	2017–18	2022	2018
Brasenose College Boat Club	Brasenose	22	—	22	1886–94	—	1894	—
New College Boat Club	New College	15	1	16	1949–53	2005	1953	2005
Balliol College Boat Club	Balliol	14	—	14	1968–71	—	1971	—
Christ Church College Boat Club	Christ Church	15	—	15	1907–10	—	2023	—
Magdalen College Boat Club	Magdalen	9	5	14	1932–34	2010–13	2008	2016
Exeter College Boat Club	Exeter	13	—	13	1854–57	—	1868	—
Pembroke College Boat Club	Pembroke	10	1	11	2012–17	—	2017	2025
University College Boat Club	University	9	1	10	1869–73	—	1926	2023
St Edmund Hall Boat Club	St Edmund Hall	6	—	6	1962–66	—	1966	—
	Osler-Green ^{a}	—	5	5	—	1995–99	—	1999
Somerville College Boat Club	Somerville	—	5	5	—	1991–94	—	1994
Wadham College Boat Club	Wadham	2	3	5	—	—	1849	2019
Corpus College Boat Club	Corpus	4	—	4	1883–85	—	1931	—
Jesus College Boat Club	Jesus	—	4	4	—	1980–83	—	1983
	Osler House ^{b}	—	4	4	—	1988–89	—	1989
Merton College Boat Club	Merton	1	2	3	—	2003–04	1927	2004
St Catherine's College Boat Club	St Catherine's	—	3	3	—	2008–09	—	2009
St John's College Boat Club	St John's	3	—	3	—	—	1967	—
Trinity College Boat Club	Trinity	3	—	3	—	—	1880	—
Worcester College Boat Club	Worcester	3	—	3	—	—	1930	—
Queen's College Boat Club	Queen's	2	—	2	—	—	1958	—
St Hugh's College Boat Club	St Hugh's	—	1	1	—	—	—	1985
Wolfson College Boat Club (Oxford)	Wolfson	1	2	3	—	—	2025	2022

^{a} Since 2008 this crew composition does not exist any more. Before the foundation of Green Templeton College, members of Green College raced with Osler House, and members of Templeton College raced with Hertford College.
^{b} Prior to the composite crew with Green College and after the foundation of Green Templeton Boat Club, Osler has raced as an independent crew formed of clinical medical students.

== Men's Head of Torpids ==
Men's Division I, places 2 to 5, 2005

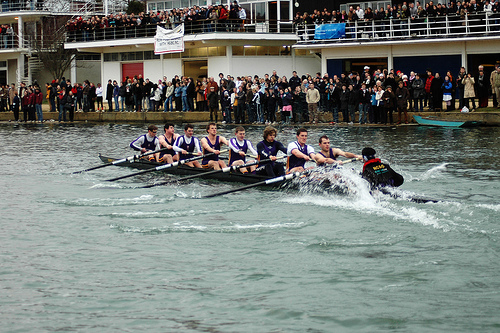
New College with a broken rudder and bow oar on Saturday, 2008

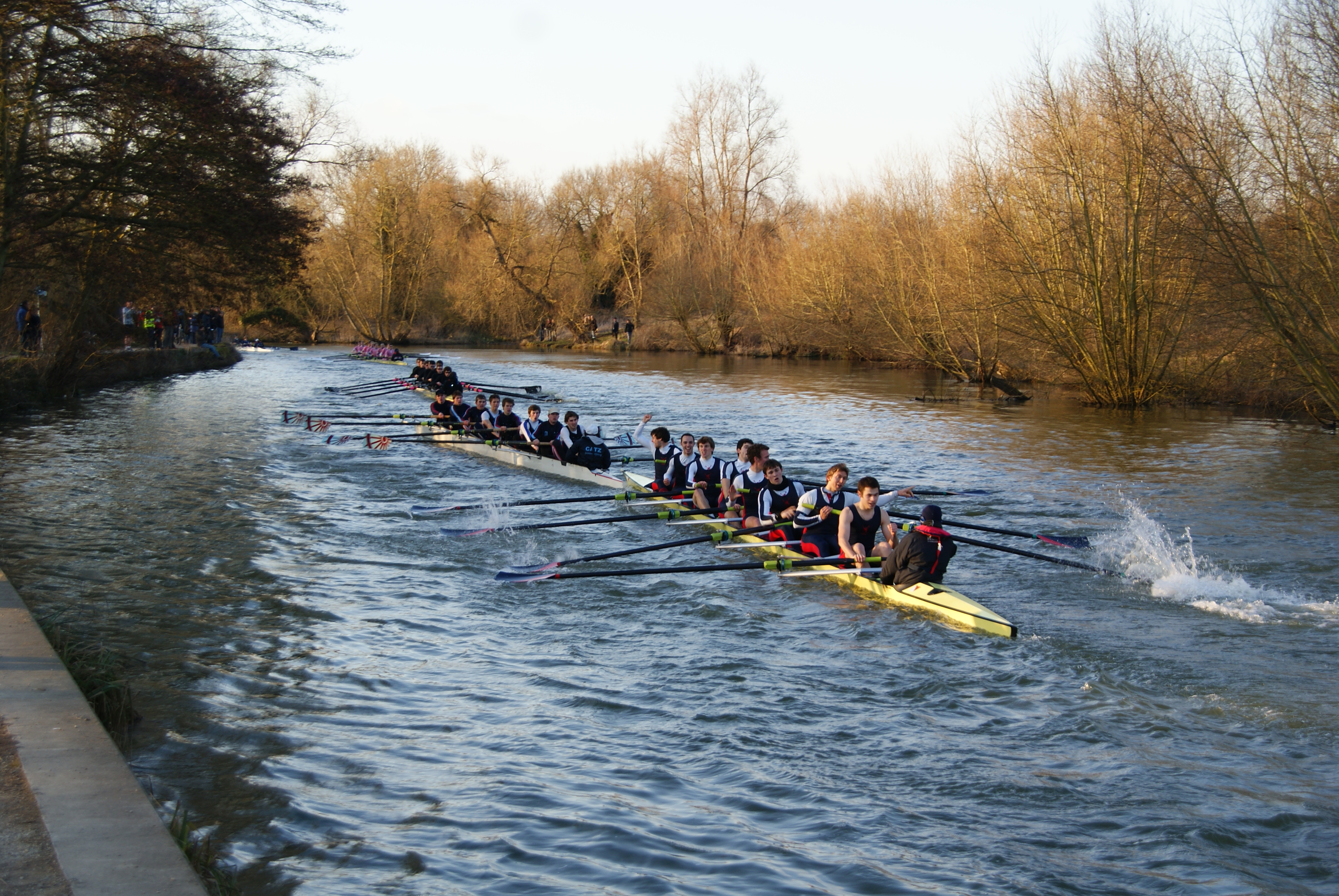
Balliol bump St Catherine's, 2010

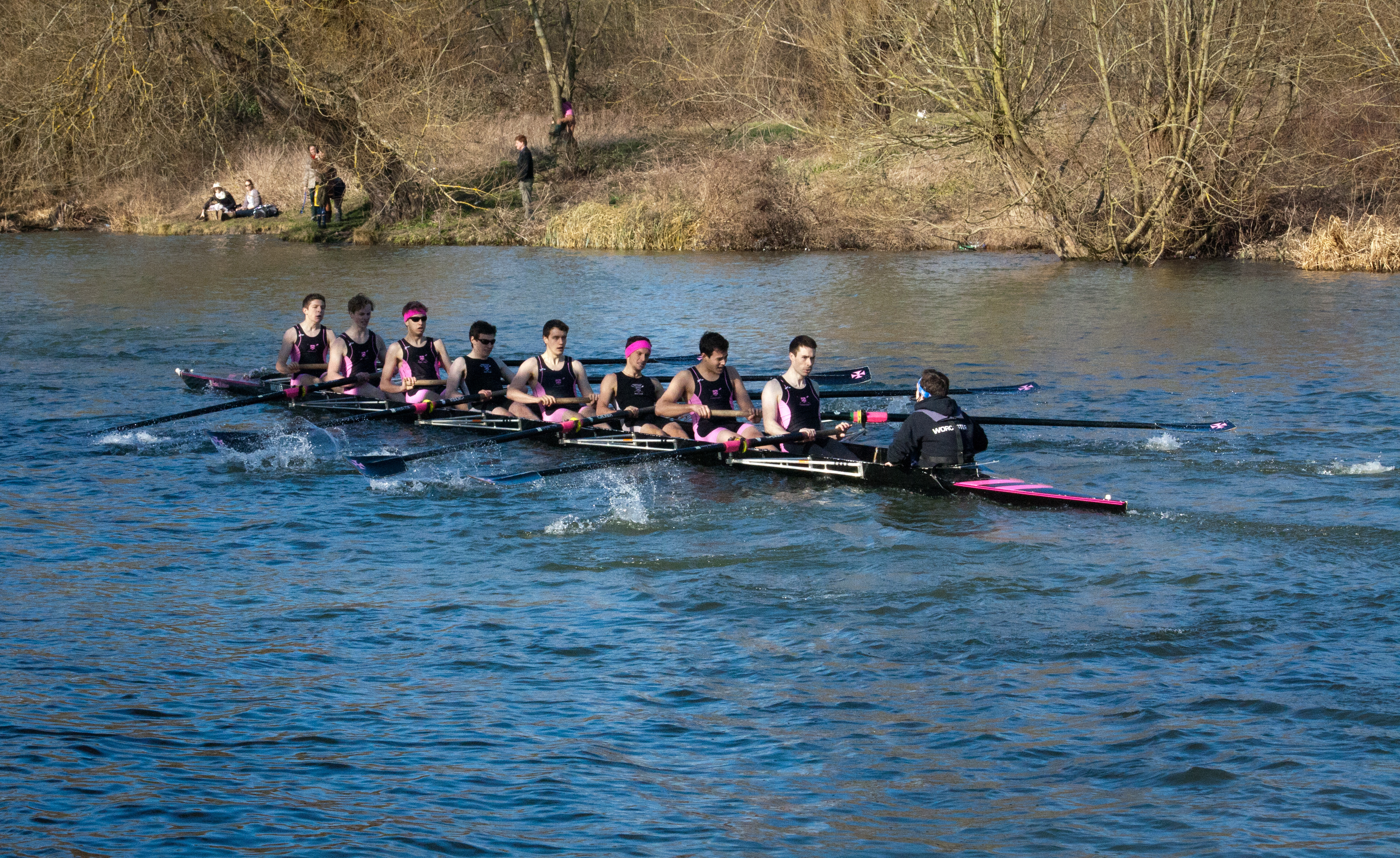
Worcester College, 2012

Torpids has been held since 1838. The following gives the colleges that were Head of the River (Head of Torpids) in these years.

Year	College	Year	College	Year	College	Year	College	Year	College
1838	Worcester	1839	Oriel	1840	Wadham	1841	Trinity	1842	Brasenose
1843	University	1844	Oriel	1845	Brasenose	1846	Exeter	1847	Exeter
1848	Brasenose	1849	Wadham	1850	Brasenose	1851	Brasenose	1852	Brasenose
1853	Brasenose	1854	Exeter	1855	Exeter	1856	Exeter	1857	Exeter
1858	Pembroke	1859	Exeter	1860	Exeter	1861	Brasenose	1862	Brasenose
1863	Exeter	1864	Exeter	1865	Exeter	1866	Brasenose	1867	Exeter
1868	Exeter	1869	University	1870	University	1871	University	1872	University
1873	University	1874	Brasenose	1875	Brasenose	1876	Trinity	1877	Pembroke
1878	Pembroke	1879	Pembroke	1880	Trinity	1881	Brasenose	1882	New College
1883	Corpus Christi	1884	Corpus Christi	1885	Corpus Christi	1886	Brasenose	1887	Brasenose
1888	Brasenose	1889	Brasenose	1890	Brasenose	1891	Brasenose	1892	Brasenose
1893	Brasenose	1894	Brasenose	1895	no racing ^{a}	1896	New College	1897	Balliol
1898	Balliol	1899	Balliol	1900	New College	1901	New College	1902	New College
1903	New College	1904	New College	1905	University	1906	University	1907	Christ Church
1908	Christ Church	1909	Christ Church	1910	Christ Church	1911	Balliol	1912	Magdalen
1913	Magdalen	1914	Christ Church	1915	— ^{b}	1916	— ^{b}	1917	— ^{b}
1918	— ^{b}	1919	— ^{b}	1920	Christ Church	1921	Christ Church	1922	Worcester
1923	Magdalen	1924	Christ Church	1925	Christ Church	1926	University	1927	Merton
1928	Balliol	1929	Balliol	1930	Worcester	1931	Corpus Christi	1932	Magdalen
1933	Magdalen	1934	Magdalen	1935	New College	1936	Magdalen	1937	Magdalen
1938	New College	1939	St Edmund Hall	1940	Trinity & Balliol	1941	— ^{c}	1942	— ^{c}
1943	— ^{c}	1944	— ^{c}	1945	— ^{c}	1946	St John's	1947	New College
1948	Christ Church	1949	New College	1950	New College	1951	New College	1952	New College
1953	New College	1954	Balliol	1955	Balliol	1956	Balliol	1957	Queen's
1958	Queen's	1959	Balliol	1960	St Edmund Hall	1961	St John's	1962	St Edmund Hall
1963	no racing ^{a}	1964	St Edmund Hall	1965	St Edmund Hall	1966	St Edmund Hall	1967	St John's
1968	Balliol	1969	Balliol	1970	Balliol	1971	Balliol	1972	Oriel
1973	Oriel	1974	Oriel	1975	Oriel	1976	Oriel	1977	no racing ^{f}
1978	Oriel	1979	Oriel	1980	Oriel	1981	Oriel	1982	Oriel
1983	Oriel	1984	Oriel	1985	Oriel	1986	Oriel ^{d}	1987	Oriel
1988	Oriel	1989	Oriel	1990	Oriel ^{d}	1991	Christ Church ^{e}	1992	Oriel
1993	Oriel	1994	Oriel ^{d}	1995	Oriel ^{d}	1996	Oriel	1997	Oriel
1998	Oriel ^{d}	1999	Pembroke	2000	no racing ^{f}	2001	Oriel	2002	no racing ^{f}
2003	Oriel ^{d}	2004	Oriel	2005	Oriel	2006	Oriel	2007	no racing ^{f}
2008	Magdalen	2009	Christ Church	2010	Christ Church	2011	Christ Church	2012	Pembroke
2013	Pembroke	2014	no racing ^{f}	2015	Pembroke	2016	Pembroke	2017	Pembroke
2018	Oriel ^{d}	2019	Oriel	2020	no racing ^{f}	2021	Oriel ^{g}	2022	Oriel
2023	Christ Church	2024	no racing ^{f}	2025	Wolfson ^{h}	2026	no racing ^{f}	2027	

^{a} No racing due to ice on the river
^{b} No racing due to World War I
^{c} No racing due to World War II
^{d} Racing held on fewer than four days
^{e} Oriel were penalty bumped four places for training while the river was in flood
^{f} No racing due to high stream
^{g} Racing held in Trinity Term instead of Summer Eights due to the COVID-19 pandemic
^{h} Racing limited to the top three divisions due to high stream

== Women's Head of Torpids ==
Women's divisions in Torpids have existed since 1978. This was delayed from 1977 when the river was flooded and Torpids was cancelled.

Year	College	Year	College	Year	College	Year	College	Year	College
1977	no racing ^{a}	1978	Hertford	1979	Wadham	1980	Jesus	1981	Jesus
1982	Jesus	1983	Jesus	1984	Osler House	1985	St Hugh's	1986	Osler House ^{b}
1987	Somerville	1988	Osler House	1989	Osler House	1990	no racing ^{c}	1991	Somerville
1992	Somerville	1993	Somerville	1994	Somerville ^{b}	1995	Osler-Green ^{b}	1996	Osler-Green
1997	Osler-Green	1998	Osler-Green ^{b}	1999	Osler-Green	2000	no racing ^{a}	2001	St Catherine's
2002	no racing ^{a}	2003	Merton ^{b}	2004	Merton	2005	New College	2006	Oriel
2007	no racing ^{a}	2008	St Catherine's	2009	St Catherine's	2010	Magdalen	2011	Magdalen
2012	Magdalen	2013	Magdalen	2014	no racing ^{a}	2015	Wadham	2016	Magdalen
2017	Oriel	2018	Oriel ^{b}	2019	Wadham	2020	no racing ^{a}	2021	Wolfson ^{d}
2022	Wolfson	2023	University	2024	no racing ^{a}	2025	Pembroke ^{e}	no racing ^{a}|	

^{a} No racing due to high stream
^{b} Racing held on fewer than four days
^{c} Only informal racing due to a fast stream
^{d} Racing held in Trinity Term instead of Summer Eights due to the COVID-19 pandemic
^{e} Racing limited to the top three divisions due to high stream

== See also ==
- Summer Eights, a similar event in Trinity Term.
- Lent Bumps, the equivalent event in Cambridge.
- Tamesis Regatta, another series of races in Michaelmas Term.
