= Ladies' Challenge Plate =

Rowing competition

- Venue: Henley Royal Regatta, River Thames
- Location: Henley-on-Thames, Oxfordshire
- Dates: 1845 – present

The Ladies' Challenge Plate is one of the events at Henley Royal Regatta on the River Thames at Henley-on-Thames in England. Crews of men's eight-oared boats below the standard of the Grand Challenge Cup can enter, although international standard heavyweight crews are not permitted to row in the Ladies' Plate.

The Ladies' Plate was first competed for in 1845, initially as the New Challenge Cup. The following year, it became the Ladies' Challenge Plate, and it has been competed for every year since, except for years which were affected by the two World Wars and the COVID-19 pandemic. Until 1966, the Ladies' Plate was originally for academic institutions in the United Kingdom, and Trinity College Dublin, but in 1967, the entry requirements were relaxed to allow entries from academic institutions throughout the world. Further changes in 1985 allowed entries from any club, and certain restrictions were placed on entries of the Thames Challenge Cup to ensure that crews of the required standard entered the more senior Ladies' Plate.

== Past winners ==
| Year | Winner | Runner-up | ref |
|---|---|---|---|
| 1845 | St George's Club, London | The Black Prince, First Trinity Boat Club | |
| 1846 | First Trinity Boat Club | Thames Club, London | |
| 1847 | Brasenose College, Oxford | First Trinity, Cambridge | |
| 1848 | Christ Church, Oxford | Worcester College, Oxford | |
| 1849 | St John of Malta (Wadham & Oriel) | Second Trinity, Cambridge | |
| 1850 | Lincoln College, Oxford | row over (no Cambridge crews entered) | |
| 1851 | Brasenose College, Oxford | Christ Church, Oxford | |
| 1852 | Pembroke College, Oxford | row over | |
| 1853 | First Trinity Boat Club | Pembroke College, Oxford | |
| 1854 | First Trinity Boat Club | Wadham College Boat Club | |
| 1855 | Balliol College, Oxford | Trinity College, Cambridge | |
| 1856 | Royal Chester Rowing Club | Lady Margaret Boat Club | |
| 1857 | Exeter College, Oxford | Pembroke College, Oxford | |
| 1858 | Balliol College, Oxford | Exeter College, Oxford | |
| 1859 | First Trinity Boat Club | Balliol College, Oxford | |
| 1860 | First Trinity Boat Club | | |
| 1861 | First Trinity Boat Club | Trinity College, Oxford | |
| 1862 | University College, Oxford | Eton College | |
| 1863 | University College, Oxford | Eton College | |
| 1864 | Eton College | | |
| 1865 | Third Trinity Boat Club | Eton College | |
| 1866 | Eton College | First Trinity, Cambridge | |
| 1867 | Eton College | Radley College | |
| 1868 | Eton College | University College, Oxford | |
| 1869 | Eton College | Lady Margaret Boat Club | |
| 1870 | Eton College | Trinity College Dublin | |
| 1871 | Pembroke College, Oxford | Eton College | |
| 1872 | Jesus College, Cambridge | Pembroke College, Oxford | |
| 1873 | Jesus College, Cambridge | Trinity College Dublin | |
| 1874 | First Trinity Boat Club | Trinity College Dublin | |
| 1875 | Trinity College Dublin | First Trinity, Cambridge | |
| 1876 | Jesus College, Cambridge | Caius College, Cambridge | |
| 1877 | Jesus College, Cambridge | Caius College, Cambridge | |
| 1878 | Jesus College, Cambridge | First Trinity, Cambridge | |
| 1879 | Lady Margaret Boat Club | Eton College | |
| 1880 | Trinity Hall, Cambridge | Eton College | |
| 1881 | First Trinity Boat Club | Eton College | |
| 1882 | Eton College | Radley College | |
| 1883 | Christ Church, Oxford | Eton College | |
| 1884 | Eton College | Radley College | |
| 1885 | Eton College | Corpus College, Oxford | |
| 1886 | Pembroke College, Cambridge | Eton College | |
| 1887 | Trinity Hall, Cambridge | First Trinity, Cambridge | |
| 1888 | Lady Margaret Boat Club | Pembroke College, Cambridge | |
| 1889 | Christ Church, Oxford | First Trinity, Cambridge | |
| 1890 | Balliol College, Oxford | Trinity Hall, Cambridge | |
| 1891 | Balliol College, Oxford | Eton College | |
| 1892 | First Trinity Boat Club | Third Trinity, Cambridge | |
| 1893 | Eton College | Radley College | |
| 1894 | Eton College | Trinity College, Oxford | |
| 1895 | Eton College | St John's College, Oxford | |
| 1896 | Eton College | Balliol College, Oxford | |
| 1897 | Eton College | Emmanuel College, Cambridge | |
| 1898 | Eton College | First Trinity, Cambridge | |
| 1899 | Eton College | Pembroke College, Cambridge | |
| 1900 | New College, Oxford | Eton College | |
| 1901 | University College, Oxford | Eton College | |
| 1902 | University College, Oxford | Eton College | |
| 1903 | Magdalen College, Oxford | Eton College | |
| 1904 | Eton College | First Trinity, Cambridge | |
| 1905 | Eton College | Christ's College, Cambridge | |
| 1906 | First Trinity Boat Club | Christ Church, Oxford | |
| 1907 | Trinity Hall, Cambridge | First Trinity, Cambridge | |
| 1908 | Jesus College, Cambridge | New College, Oxford | |
| 1909 | St John's College, Oxford | First Trinity, Cambridge | |
| 1910 | Eton College | Balliol College, Oxford | |
| 1911 | Eton College | First Trinity, Cambridge | |
| 1912 | Eton College | Radley College | |
| 1913 | First Trinity Boat Club | Trinity College, Oxford | |
| 1914 | Pembroke College, Cambridge | First Trinity, Cambridge | |
| 1920 | Christ Church, Oxford | Merton College, Oxford | |
| 1921 | Eton College | Lady Margaret Boat Club | |
| 1922 | Brasenose College, Oxford | Magdalen College, Oxford | |
| 1923 | Trinity College, Oxford | Jesus College, Cambridge | |
| 1924 | Shrewsbury School | Jesus College, Cambridge | |
| 1925 | Lady Margaret Boat Club | Radley College | |
| 1926 | Jesus College, Cambridge | Pembroke College, Cambridge | |
| 1927 | First Trinity Boat Club | Third Trinity, Cambridge | |
| 1928 | Jesus College, Cambridge | Selwyn College, Cambridge | |
| 1929 | First Trinity Boat Club | University College, Oxford | |
| 1930 | Lady Margaret Boat Club | Pembroke College, Cambridge | |
| 1931 | Jesus College, Cambridge | Shrewsbury School | |
| 1932 | Shrewsbury School | Oriel College, Oxford | |
| 1933 | Lady Margaret Boat Club | Magdalen College, Oxford | |
| 1934 | Jesus College, Cambridge | Trinity College Dublin | |
| 1935 | Trinity Hall, Cambridge | Eton College | |
| 1936 | First Trinity Boat Club | Clare College, Cambridge | |
| 1937 | Clare College, Cambridge | First Trinity, Cambridge | |
| 1938 | Radley College | Pembroke College, Cambridge | |
| 1939 | Clare College, Cambridge | Corpus Christi College, Cambridge | |
| 1946 | Jesus College, Cambridge | Trinity College Dublin | |
| 1947 | First and Third Trinity Boat Club | Eton College | |
| 1948 | Eton College | Bryanston School | |
| 1949 | Lady Margaret Boat Club | Pembroke College, Cambridge | |
| 1950 | New College, Oxford | Trinity College Dublin | |
| 1951 | Pembroke College, Cambridge | Jesus College, Cambridge | |
| 1952 | Lady Margaret Boat Club | Trinity Hall, Cambridge | |
| 1953 | Jesus College, Cambridge | Radley College | |
| 1954 | First and Third Trinity Boat Club | Trinity Hall, Cambridge | |
| 1955 | Queens' College, Cambridge | Lady Margaret Boat Club | |
| 1956 | Peterhouse, Cambridge | Magdalene College, Cambridge | |
| 1957 | Pembroke College, Cambridge | Christ Church, Oxford | |
| 1958 | Jesus College, Cambridge | Christ Church, Oxford | |
| 1959 | Lady Margaret Boat Club | Emmanuel College, Cambridge | |
| 1960 | Eton College | Jesus College, Cambridge | |
| 1961 | Lady Margaret Boat Club | Eton College | |
| 1962 | Queens' College, Cambridge | First & Third Trinity, Cambridge | |
| 1963 | Royal Military Academy, Sandhurst | St Edmund Hall, Oxford | |
| 1964 | Pembroke College, Cambridge | Royal Military Academy, Sandhurst | |
| 1965 | St Edmund Hall, Oxford | Jesus College, Cambridge | |
| 1966 | Lady Margaret Boat Club | Jesus College, Cambridge | |
| 1967 | First and Third Trinity Boat Club | Emanuel School | |
| 1968 | Cherwell Boat Club | First & Third Trinity, Cambridge | |
| 1969 | ASR Nereus, Netherlands | Trinity College, USA | |
| 1970 | G.S.R. Aegir, Netherlands | University of London | |
| 1971 | University of London | Trinity College, USA | |
| 1972 | DSRV Laga, Netherlands | G.S.R. Aegir, Netherlands | |
| 1973 | Harvard University, USA | DSR Laga, Netherlands | |
| 1974 | University College Dublin, Ireland | University of London | |
| 1975 | University of London | Isis Boat Club | |
| 1976 | Trinity College, Hartford, USA | Queen's University, Belfast | |
| 1977 | Trinity College Dublin | Pembroke College, Cambridge | |
| 1978 | Imperial College, London | Yale University | |
| 1979 | Yale University, USA | Downing College, Cambridge | |
| 1980 | Yale University, USA | Witwatersrand University, South Africa | |
| 1981 | University of Washington, USA | Yale University | |
| 1982 | University of London | Isis Boat Club | |
| 1983 | Harvard University, USA | Isis Boat Club | |
| 1984 | Brown University, USA | Temple University, USA | |
| 1985 | Leander Club | Garda Siochana Boat Club, Ireland | |
| 1986 | Neptune Rowing Club, Ireland | Harvard University, USA | |
| 1987 | University of London | Tideway Scullers School | |
| 1988 | Mercantile Rowing Club, Australia | Leander Club | |
| 1989 | NCRA | Harvard University, USA | |
| 1990 | Harvard University, USA | University of London | |
| 1991 | Leander Club & Molesey Boat Club | University of London & Oxford University | |
| 1992 | Imperial College, London | ASR Nereus, Netherlands | |
| 1993 | Brown University, USA | NCRA | |
| 1994 | College Boat Club, Pennsylvania, USA | London & NCRA | |
| 1995 | NCRA | Princeton University, USA | |
| 1996 | Goldie Boat Club | Leander Club | |
| 1997 | NCRA & Oxford Brookes | University of Washington, USA | |
| 1998 | Harvard University, USA | Cambridge University & Star Club | |
| 1999 | Cambridge University & Queen's Tower Boat Club | University of California-Berkeley, USA | |
| 2000 | Brown University, USA | ORC Rostock & Heidelberger Rg, Germany | |
| 2001 | Dartmouth Rowing Club, USA | Princeton University, USA | |
| 2002 | Harvard University, USA | Molesey Boat Club | |
| 2003 | University of Washington, USA | Rutgers University, USA | |
| 2004 | Leander Club | Harvard University, USA | |
| 2005 | Cambridge University Boat Club | Leander Club | |
| 2006 | Princeton University, USA | Leander Club & Molesey Boat Club | |
| 2007 | Harvard University, USA | Molesey Boat Club & New York Athletic, USA | |
| 2008 | Leander Club | RSVU Okeanos & DSR Laga, Netherlands | |
| 2009 | Brown University, USA | Leander Club & Molesey Boat Club | |
| 2010 | Harvard University, USA | Oxford Brookes & Oxford University Boat Club | |
| 2011 | Berliner Ruderclub and Olympische Ruder Club Rostock, Germany | Leander Club | |
| 2012 | Harvard University, USA | Leander Club | |
| 2013 | Leander Club & Molesey Boat Club | Northeastern University, USA | |
| 2014 | University of California, Berkeley, USA | Leander Club | |
| 2015 | Yale University USA | University of Washington, USA | |
| 2016 | Leander Club | Following disqualification of ASR Nereus | |
| 2017 | Oxford Brookes & Taurus | Molesey Boat Club & London Rowing Club | |
| 2018 | Oxford Brookes | Oxford Brookes & Edinburgh University Boat Club | |
| 2019 | Oxford Brookes | Hollandia Roeiclub | |
| 2020 | No competition due to COVID-19 pandemic | | |
| 2021 | Oxford Brookes | Molesey Boat Club & Twickenham Rowing Club | |
| 2022 | Leander Club | University of California, Berkeley, USA | |
| 2023 | Oxford Brookes | Leander Club | |
| 2024 | Princeton University, USA | Cambridge University Boat Club | |
| 2025 | Leander Club | Oxford Brookes | |
| 2026 | Leander Club | Cambridge University and Harvard University, U.S.A | |
