= Visitors' Challenge Cup =

Event at the annual Henley Royal Regatta

- Venue: Henley Royal Regatta, River Thames
- Location: Henley-on-Thames, Oxfordshire
- Dates: 1847 – present

The Visitors Challenge Cup is a rowing event for men's coxless fours at the annual Henley Royal Regatta on the River Thames at Henley-on-Thames in England. It is open to male crews from all eligible rowing clubs and has similar qualifying rules to the Ladies' Challenge Plate. Two or more clubs may combine to make an entry.

== Past winners ==
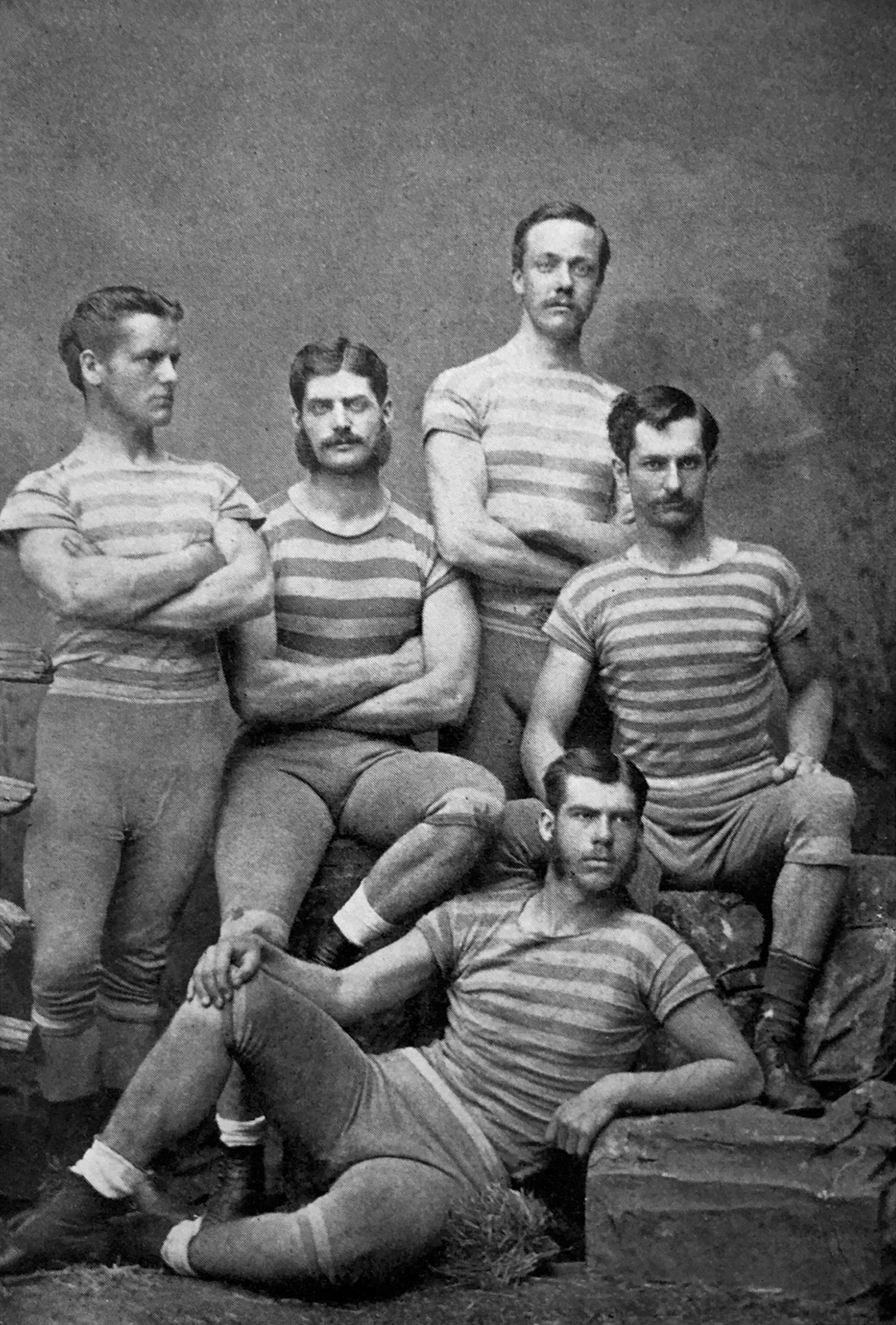
1878 winners Columbia College Crew, l to r: Charles Eldridge, Edward E. Sage, Cyrus Edson, Jasper T. Goodwin & Henry G. Ridabock (laying in front)

Year	Winner	Runner-Up	ref
1847	Christ Church, Oxford	St George's Club	
1848	Christ Church, Oxford	row over	
1849	Second Trinity, Cambridge	row over	
1850	Christ Church, Oxford	Lincoln College, Oxford	
1851	Christ Church, Oxford	First Trinity, Cambridge	
1852	Argonaut Club	Christ Church, Oxford	
1853	Argonaut Club	Trinity College, Cambridge	
1854	Lady Margaret Boat Club	Pembroke College, Oxford	
1855	Lady Margaret Boat Club	Balliol College, Oxford	
1856	Lady Margaret Boat Club	Royal Chester	
1857	Pembroke College, Oxford	Lady Margaret Boat Club	
1858	First Trinity, Cambridge	Pembroke College, Oxford	
1859	Third Trinity, Cambridge	row over	
1860	First Trinity, Cambridge	row over	
1861	First Trinity, Cambridge	Brasenose College, Oxford	
1862	Brasenose College, Oxford	Third Trinity, Cambridge	
1863	Brasenose College, Oxford	row over, Third Trinity, Cm (withdrew)	
1864	University College, Oxford	row over	
1865	Third Trinity, Cambridge	row over	
1866	University College, Oxford	First Trinity, Cambridge	
1867	University College, Oxford	row over	
1868	University College, Oxford	First Trinity, Cambridge	
1869	University College, Oxford	Lady Margaret Boat Club	
1870	Trinity College Dublin	University College, Oxford	
1871	First Trinity, Cambridge	Trinity College Dublin	
1872	Pembroke College, Oxford	Trinity College Dublin	
1873	Trinity College Dublin	row over	
1874	Trinity College Dublin	Brasenose College, Oxford	
1875	University College, Oxford	Trinity College Dublin	
1876	University College, Oxford	Brasenose College, Oxford	
1877	Jesus College, Cambridge	Keble College, Oxford	
1878	Columbia College	Hertford College, Oxford	
1879	Lady Margaret Boat Club	Magdalen College, Oxford	
1880	Third Trinity, Cambridge	Trinity Hall, Cambridge	
1881	First Trinity, Cambridge	Lady Margaret Boat Club	
1882	Brasenose College, Oxford	Trinity Hall, Cambridge	
1883	Christ Church, Oxford	Caius College, Cambridge	
1884	Third Trinity, Cambridge	Christ Church, Oxford	
1885	Trinity Hall, Cambridge	Magdalen College, Oxford	
1886	First Trinity, Cambridge	Clare College, Cambridge	
1887	Trinity Hall, Cambridge	Jesus College, Cambridge	
1888	Brasenose College, Oxford	Trinity Hall, Cambridge	
1889	Third Trinity, Cambridge	Lady Margaret Boat Club	
1890	Brasenose College, Oxford	Pembroke College, Cambridge	
1891	Trinity Hall, Cambridge	Brasenose College, Oxford	
1892	Third Trinity, Cambridge	Queen's College, Oxford	
1893	Third Trinity, Cambridge	First Trinity, Cambridge	
1894	New College, Oxford	row over	
1895	Trinity College, Oxford	Trinity Hall, Cambridge	
1896	Caius College, Cambridge	Magdalen College, Oxford	
1897	Trinity College, Oxford	Jesus College, Cambridge	
1898	New College, Oxford	University College, Oxford	
1899	Balliol College, Oxford	New College, Oxford	
1900	Trinity College, Cambridge	Magdalen College, Oxford	
1901	Balliol College, Oxford	Caius College, Cambridge	
1902	Jesus College, Cambridge	Balliol College, Oxford	
1903	University College, Oxford	Magdalen College, Oxford	
1904	Third Trinity, Cambridge	University College, Oxford	
1905	Trinity Hall, Cambridge	Third Trinity, Cambridge	
1906	Third Trinity, Cambridge	Jesus College, Cambridge	
1907	Magdalen College, Oxford	Leander Club	
1908	Magdalen College, Oxford	Jesus College, Cambridge	
1909	Christ Church, Oxford	St. John's College, Oxford	
1910	Trinity Hall, Cambridge	Balliol College, Oxford	
1911	Third Trinity, Cambridge	Trinity College, Oxford	
1912	Christ Church, Oxford	Christ Church, Oxford	
1913	Pembroke College, Cambridge	University College, Oxford	
1914	Lady Margaret Boat Club	Magdalen College, Oxford	
1920	Merton College, Oxford	King's College London	
1921	Lincoln College, Oxford	Magdalen College, Oxford	
1922	Third Trinity, Cambridge	Lincoln College, Oxford	
1923	Magdalen College, Oxford	Trinity College, Oxford	
1924	Third Trinity, Cambridge	Exeter College, Oxford	
1925	Third Trinity, Cambridge	Brasenose College, Oxford	
1926	Christ Church, Oxford	Corpus Christi College, Cambridge	
1927	Christ's College, Cambridge	First Trinity, Cambridge	
1928	First Trinity, Cambridge	Jesus College, Cambridge	
1929	Third Trinity, Cambridge	Trinity Hall, Cambridge	
1930	Brasenose College, Oxford	Pembroke College, Cambridge	
1931	Pembroke College, Cambridge	Third Trinity, Cambridge	
1932	Jesus College, Cambridge	Trinity College, Oxford	
1933	Christ's College, Cambridge	Trinity College, Oxford	
1934	First Trinity, Cambridge	University College, Oxford	
1935	Jesus College, Cambridge	First Trinity, Cambridge	
1936	Jesus College, Cambridge	Oriel College, Oxford	
1937	Trinity Hall, Cambridge	Thames Rowing Club	
1938	Oriel College, Oxford	Third Trinity, Cambridge	
1939	Trinity Hall, Cambridge	New College, Oxford	
1946	First & Third Trinity, Cambridge	New College, Oxford	
1947	Trinity Hall, Cambridge	Emmanuel College, Cambridge	
1948	Magdalen College, Oxford	New College, Oxford	
1949	Clare College, Cambridge	First & Third Trinity, Cambridge	
1950	Lady Margaret Boat Club	Emmanuel College, Cambridge	
1951	Trinity Hall, Cambridge	First & Third Trinity, Cambridge	
1952	Pembroke College, Cambridge	Trinity College, Oxford	
1953	Magdalen College, Oxford	King's College, Cambridge	
1954	First & Third Trinity, Cambridge	Magdalen College, Oxford	
1955	Trinity Hall, Cambridge	Lady Margaret Boat Club	
1956	Merton College, Oxford	Magdalene College, Cambridge	
1957	Pembroke College, Cambridge	Christ Church, Oxford	
1958	Keble College, Oxford	St Edmund Hall, Oxford	
1959	Pembroke College, Cambridge	Lady Margaret Boat Club	
1960	First & Third Trinity, Cambridge	King's College, Cambridge	
1961	St Edmund Hall, Oxford	St. Catharine's College, Cambridge	
1962	Keble College, Oxford	Chelsea College, London	
1963	Christ's College, Cambridge	Pembroke College, Cambridge	
1964	Pembroke College, Cambridge	St. Catharine's College, Cambridge	
1965	St Edmund Hall, Oxford	Fitzwilliam House, Cambridge	
1966	Lady Margaret Boat Club	Imperial College	
1967	Magdalene College, Cambridge	First & Third Trinity, Cambridge	
1968	Imperial College Boat Club	Trinity College, Dublin	
1969	Eton College	Clare College, Cambridge	
1970	Fitzwilliam College, Cambridge	St. Thomas's Hospital, London	
1971	University of London	Keble College, Oxford	
1972	University of London	First & Third Trinity, Cambridge	
1973	First & Third Trinity, Cambridge	Exeter University	
1974	Pembroke College, Cambridge	Christ Church, Oxford	
1975	Ealing High Schools	Vesper Boat Club	
1976	University of London	Salisbury School, USA	
1977	University of Washington, USA	Lady Margaret Boat Club	
1978	Durham University	University College & Hospital, London	
1979	Strode's College & Wallingford School	Lady Margaret Boat Club	
1980	University of London	Lady Margaret Boat Club	
1981	University of London	Durham University	
1982	Durham University	Natal University, South Africa	
1983	University of London	Imperial College	
1984	Shiplake College & Sir William Borlase's	Reading University	
1985	Imperial College Boat Club	University of London	
1986	Reading University	University of London	
1987	Imperial College Boat Club	University of London	
1988	Durham University	Imperial College	
1989	Isis Boat Club	Durham University	
1990	University of London	Goldie Boat Club	
1991	Goldie Boat Club	University of London	
1992	Durham University	University of British Columbia, Canada	
1993	The King's School, Chester	University of London	
1994	Imperial College Boat Club	University of London	
1995	Isis Boat Club	University of London	
1996	W.S.R. Argo, Holland	Isis Boat Club	
1997	Oxford Brookes University	Imperial College & Charing Cross & Westminster	
1998	Isis Boat Club	Imperial College	
1999	Oxford Brookes University	Imperial College Boat Club	
2000	Oxford Brookes University	University of London	
2001	Oxford Brookes University & Taurus	Molesey Boat Club	
2002	Oxford Brookes University & Imperial College Boat Club	Cambridge University	
2003	NUI Galway & Skibbereen Rowing Club	Cambridge University	
2004	Oxford Brookes University & Oxford University	Cambridge University	
2005	NUI Galway	Oxford Brookes University	
2006	Oxford Brookes University & Leander Club	Molesey Boat Club & Imperial College Boat Club	
2007	Leander Club	Reading University Boat Club & Agecroft Rowing Club	
2008	Imperial College Boat Club & Kingston Rowing Club	Martyrs Boat Club & Christ Church, Oxford	
2009	Isis	Mercyhurst College, U.S.A	
2010	Leander Club & Durham University	Leander Club A	
2011	Leander Club & Imperial College Boat Club	NUI Galway & Gráinne Mhaol Rowing Club	
2012	Oxford Brookes University & Molesey Boat Club	Nereus Rowing Club	
2013	Harvard University A	Harvard University B	
2014	Harvard University	Leander Club	
2015	University of California, Berkeley, USA	Sydney Rowing Club	
2016	Thames Rowing Club	University of California, Berkeley, USA	
2017	Leander Club	Cambridge University	
2018	Leander Club	University of London	
2019	Cambridge University & Leander Club	Nereus Rowing Club & D.S.R.V. Laga	
2020	No competition due to COVID-19 pandemic		
2021	Oxford Brookes University	Leander Club	
2022	University of Washington, USA	Tideway Scullers' School & Molesey Boat Club	
2023	Oxford Brookes University	Leander Club	
2024	Leander Club	Oxford Brookes University & Taurus	
2025	Leander Club & Tideway Scullers	Oxford Brookes University	
2026	Nautilus Rowing Club 'A'	Leander Club 'B'	
