= Balliol College Boat Club =

British rowing club

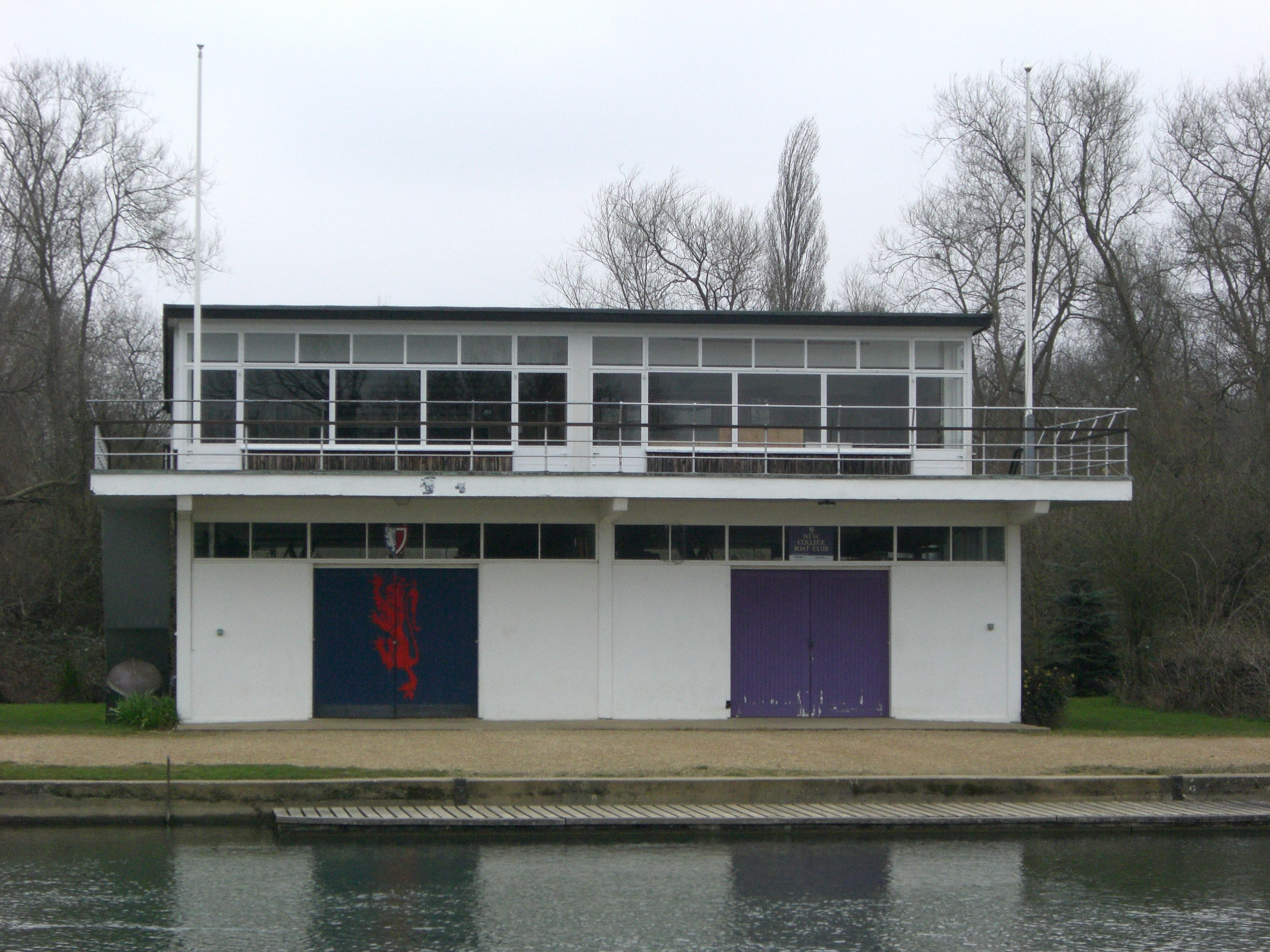

- Balliol Boathouse (left) and Rowing Blade colours
- Home water: River Thames (Isis)
- Founded: c. 1840
- Key people: Markus Baumgartner (President); Helena Marshall and Sophie Winter (Women's Captains); Oscar Hayden (Men's Captain); Harriet Booth (Captain of Coxes)
- Head of the River: Men: 1851, 1855, 1859, 1860, 1873, 1879, 1952, 1955, 1956, 2008; Women: 2010, 2011
- University: University of Oxford
- Colours
- Affiliations: St John's College, Cambridge (Sister college); British Rowing (boat code BAL)
- Website: bcbc.ballioljcr.org

Balliol College Boat Club (BCBC) is the rowing club for members of Balliol College, Oxford, England. It is one of the college boat clubs at the University of Oxford.

Balliol College Boat Club competes in rowing regattas organised by Oxford University Rowing Clubs, including Torpids and Summer Eights, as well as external regattas such as Marlow Regatta and Henley Royal Regatta.

The club is governed by a committee consisting of student representatives and an overseeing senior member (currently Professor Robin Chowdhury). All are unelected, or elected by the previous committee, and volunteer their time to the club.

== History ==
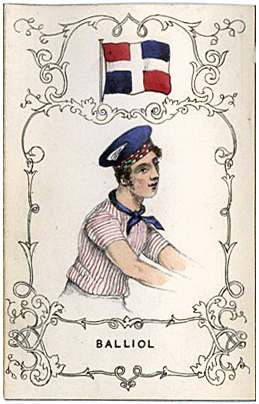
An 1840s depiction of Balliol College's rowing outfit, including a blue bonnet with a chequered red, green and white band and jersey with thin red vertical stripes.

The earliest definite allusion to Balliol rowing is in 1823, when there was a “boat match between the Rowers of Balliol and Christ Church, which was won by the former, after a well-contested race.” Balliol was certainly one of the four colleges competing in an eight in the summer races of 1825. Two Balliol men rowed for Oxford in the first University Boat Race at Henley in 1829, in a boat lent by Balliol for the occasion.

The Balliol College Archives have much material concerning the Boat Club from about 1840 onwards. The College Buttery has an extensive collection of sports photographs and trophies including many to do with the Boat Club. Although it is questioned whether an official boat club existed until the 1850s.

The base of the Boat Club for the latter part of the 19th century and much of the 20th century was a grand barge, which was moored on the River Thames at the south side of Christ Church Meadow. The barge was bought from the Skinners' Company in 1859. The present boathouse (semi-detached, with New College occupying the other half) was opened in May 1959. The barge was on view in 1996 at Henley, when it was up for auction.

The first recorded headship by Balliol College was in 1851, bumping Wadham College on the first day, and later they reclaimed headship in 1855 on the seventh night after bumping Brasenose College. The College has been Head of the River in the Summer Eights many times, notably a longish run in the 1950s and also regaining the Headship in 2008. Balliol's previous last reign at the Head of the River was when they were head of Torpids for three consecutive years (1968–71).

At the 1975 British Rowing Championships, Balliol won the lightweight men's quad sculls.

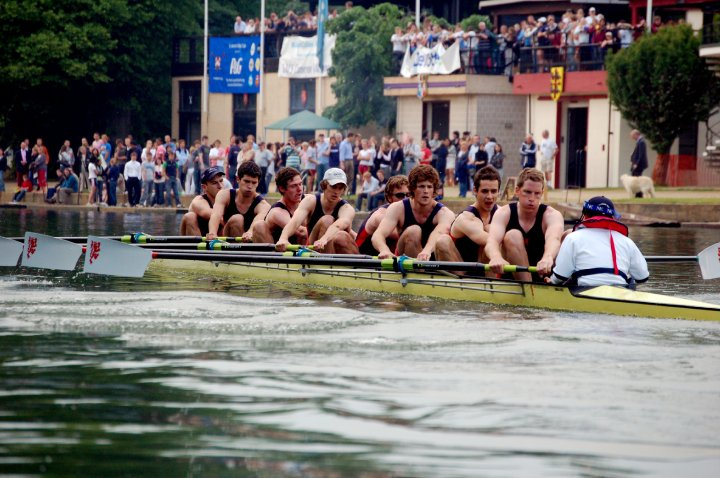
Balliol College 1st VIII rowing to the Summer Eights Headship in 2008.

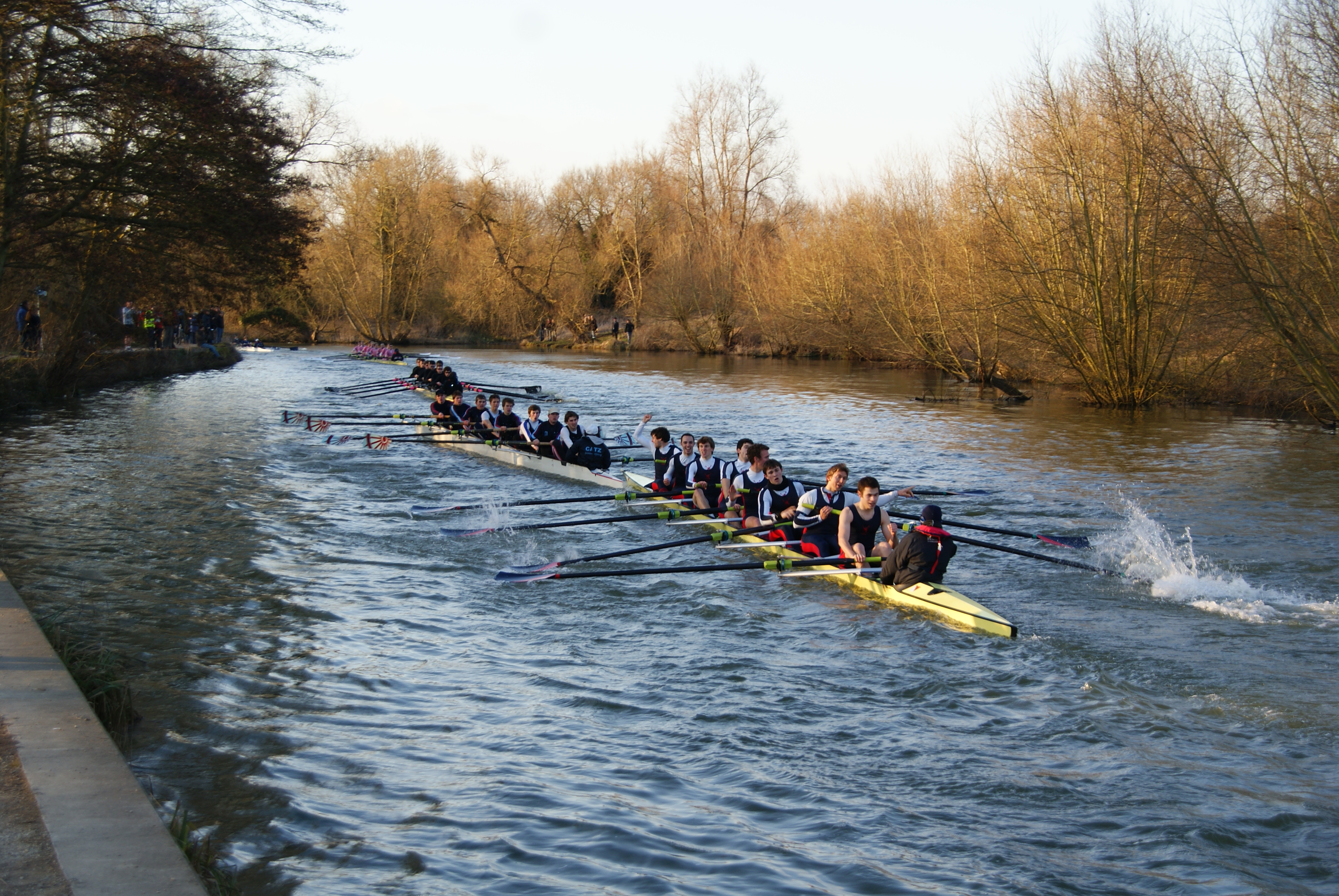
Balliol College bumping St Catherine's College at Torpids in 2010.

In 2008, Balliol's Men regained the Head of the River in the Oxford Summer Eights competition, the first time in 52 years. In 2010 and 2011, the College's women were placed "Head of the River" in the Summer Eights, the first time in recent decades. The club has a history of developing new talent, and the club's lower boats have also performed very well in recent years. The combined efforts of the more experienced oarsmen and a talented crop of novices helped BCBC to top the bumps charts for both Torpids and Summer Eights in 2008 and 2009. The BCBC Torpids campaign of 2008 was the most successful campaign by an Oxford University college on record, with the five crews entered by Balliol College Boat Club bumping on average 5.4 times over the four days of racing.

Following this success in the first decade of the new millennium, both sides of the boat club have slipped down the rankings but remain very competitive in division 1. As at 2020, the Men's First VIII was 7th on the river, and the Women's First VIII placed 11th for Summer Eights.

=== Alumni ===
Famous Balliol oarsmen have included Lord Justice Chitty, Edmond Warre (Head Master of Eton), Frederick Septimus Kelly (composer, killed in France 1916: considered one of the greatest oarsmen of all time having won at least one event at Henley Royal Regatta each year from 1902–1906 and Olympic gold in 1908), Cardinal Heard, Dan Snow (three time 'Blue' and 2001 OUBC president), HM King Olav V of Norway and HM King Harald V of Norway (who was taught to row by fellow student Nick Bevan, later a rowing coach).

=== Rivalries ===
Not having traditionally been a "rowing college" over much of the 20th century, Balliol College has few rivalries with other Oxford colleges. However, the Balliol/Trinity rivalry, which exists in other facets of college life, is felt more recently, as Trinity has caught up with Balliol in Summer VIII's, and Balliol has defeated Trinity to claim victory in Christ Church Regatta in 2013.

== Honours ==
=== Henley Royal Regatta ===
Balliol has won the following events at the Henley Royal Regatta:

- Ladies' Challenge Plate – 1855, 1858, 1890, 1891
- Visitors' Challenge Cup – 1899, 1901
- Silver Goblets – 1851, 1857, 1859
- Diamond Challenge Sculls – 1902

=== Eights headships ===
- Men: 1851, 1855, 1859, 1860, 1873, 1879, 1952, 1955, 1956, 2008
- Women: 2010, 2011

=== Torpids headships ===
- Men: 1897–99, 1911, 1928, 1929, 1954, 1968–71

=== Boat Race representatives ===
The following rowers were part of the rowing club at the time of their participation in The Boat Race.

Men's boat race

Year	Name
1829	E. J. Arbuthnot
1829	J. J. Toogood
1836	John Pennefather
1839	R. Hobhouse
1839	Philip Lybbe Powys
1840	W. Rogers
1841	H. Wm. Hodgson
1842	A. T. W. Shadwell (cox)
1849	J. W. Chitty
1849	J. W. Chitty
1852	Reginald John Buller
1852	J. W. Chitty
1856	Arthur P. Lonsdale
1857	E. Warre
1857	Arthur P. Lonsdale
1858	E. Lane
1858	E. Warre
1858	H. S. Walpole (cox)
1859	V. Lawless
1859	G. Morrison
1859	G. Thomas
1861	G. Morrison
1862	A. Morrison
1863	A. Morrison
1863	W. Awdry
1864	W. Awdry
1865	A. Morrison
1868	W. D. Benson
1868	S. D. Darbishire
1869	W. D. Benson
1869	S. D. Darbishire
1870	J. E. Edwards-Moss
1870	W. D. Benson
1870	S. D. Darbishire
1871	J. E. Edwards-Moss
1877	W. H. Grenfell
1877	A. J. Mullholland

Year	Name
1878	W. H. Grenfell
1898	F. W. Warre
1898	A. T. Herbert
1899	C. W. Tomkinson
1899	A. H. D. Steel
1899	H. J. Hale
1899	F. W. Warre
1899	A. T. Herbert
1900	C. W. Tomkinson
1901	H. J. Hale
1901	F. W. Warre
1902	H. J. Hale
1903	A. K. Graham
1903	F. S. Kelly
1904	A. K. Graham
1905	H. M. Farrer
1905	L. E. Jones
1905	A. K. Graham
1906	L. E. Jones
1907	W. T. Heard
1910	M. B. Higgins
1912	A. H. M. Wedderburn
1913	A. H. M. Wedderburn
1914	R. W. Fletcher
1920	N. H. MacNeil
1920	H. W. B. Cairns
1923	R. K. Kane
1925	R. Knox (cox)
1928	W. S. Llewellyn
1930	M. J. Waterhouse
1934	J. H. Lascelles
1934	G. I. F. Thomson
1939	H. P. V. Massey (cox)
1950	J. G. C. Blacker
1951	G. Carver (cox)
1952	K. H. Keniston
1954	R. A. Wheadon

Year	Name
1956	D. A. Cross
1961	C. P. M. Gomm
1963	N. V. Bevan
1966	J. B. Rogers jr. (cox)
1968	J. P. W. Hawksley
1969	D. M. Higgs
1969	N. D. C. Tee
1970	D. M. Higgs
1970	N. D. C. Tee
1971	J. Hawksley
1972	D. R. Payne
1972	J. P. W. Hawksley
1973	D. R. Payne
1974	N. D. C. Tee
1974	D. R. Payne
1975	N. D. C. Tee
1977	G. E. Vardey
1984	D. M. Rose
1985	P. M. Hare
1987	Andy D. Lobbenberg (cox)
1988	Andy D. Lobbenberg (cox)
1999	Dan Snow
2000	Dan Snow
2001	Dan Snow

Women's boat race

Year	Name
2015	Caryn Davies
2017	Eleanor Shearer (cox)
2024	Tessa Haining
2025	Tessa Haining

== Equipment ==
BCBC has greatly benefited from the generous donations of old Balliolites over the years. The current men's and women's first boats, the 'Beeland Rogers' and the 'Happy Rogers' respectively, reflect this trend. Beeland Rogers is a R86 Empacher while Happy Rogers is a more standard lightweight K series boat. These boats were purchased following donations from American Balliol alumni Jim Rogers.

== Training and coaching ==
Novice and development crews train on the stretch of the Thames, known as "The Isis" locally, which flows through Oxford, but senior crews train further afield at Abingdon, utilising the facilities of Abingdon Rowing Club.

Coaches have included George New and Nick Bevan, who attended Balliol in 1960 and has had a long history in rowing coaching at school level. He was originally approached by Balliol to help coach the Men's 1st and 2nd VIIIs but found a home with the Women of Balliol.

== See also ==
- Balliol College
- Torpids
- Summer Eights
- Oxford University Rowing Clubs
- Oxford University Boat Club
- British Rowing

== Bibliography ==
- Sherwood, W. E. (1900). "Oxford rowing: a history of boat-racing at Oxford from the earliest times, with a record of the races; compiled principally from official sources". Frowde.
