= St Catherine's College Boat Club =

British rowing club

- Boat Club shield with motto

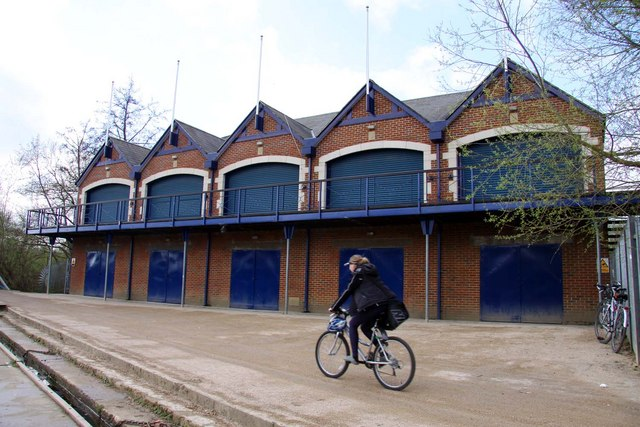

- Boathouse and rowing blade colours
- Coordinates: 51.742171°N 1.24961°W
- Home water: The Isis
- Founded: 1875
- Key people: Joseph Grey (Men's Captain); Shane McCarthy (Men's Captain); Ilayda Karadag (Women's Captain); Abby Hespe (Women's Captain)
- University: University of Oxford
- Colours
- Affiliations: British Rowing (boat code SCO); Robinson College, Cambridge (Sister college)
- Website: catzrowing.org

St Catherine's College Boat Club (SCCBC) is the rowing club of St Catherine's College, Oxford. Established in 1875 originally as St. Catharine's Boat Club, the club takes part in Torpids and Summer Eights and is affiliated to the British Rowing and Oxford University Boat Club and is sometimes referred to as St Catz BC.

== History ==
In 1868, the University established a society for non-Collegiate students, members of which in 1874 founded St. Catharine's Club; from this sprang St. Catharine's Boat Club (SCBC) in 1875. In 1919, the Boat Club changed the spelling to St. Catherine. The Boat Club became the SCCBC. In Oxford, SCCBC first took part in Torpids and Summer Eights in 1876.

== Notable members ==
The club achieved its first Blue in 1967 and first women Blues in 1976. Crews have participated in regattas, starting with an entry for the Wyfold Cup at Henley Royal Regatta in 1883. International representation began with the Commonwealth Games in 1958, and since 1986 SCCBC men and women have filled places in national crews.

Matthew Pinsent was the first Olympic Gold associated with the club, winning at the 1992 Summer Olympics. Since then, British Olympic gold medallist Andrew Triggs Hodge, and silver medallist Colin Smith have rowed for the college.

== Honours ==
=== Boat Race representatives ===
The following rowers were part of the rowing club at the time of their participation in The Boat Race.

Men's boat race

Year	Name
1967	P. D. Miller (cox)
1978	T. J. Sutton
1990	Rupert J. Obholzer
1990	Matthew Pinsent
1991	Rupert J. Obholzer
1991	Matthew Pinsent
1991	Neil Chugani (cox)
1993	Matthew Pinsent
1993	Philip A. Schuller
1994	Chris N. Mahne
1995	Laird St Reed
1996	Damien R. West
2000	Matt J. Smith
2001	Matt J. Smith
2002	Matt J. Smith
2004	Colin Smith

Year	Name
2005	Chris Liwski
2005	Andrew Triggs Hodge
2006	Colin Smith
2006	Bastien Ripoll
2007	Ante Kušurin
2007	Nick Brodie (cox)
2008	Jan Herzog
2008	Nick Brodie (cox)
2009	Colin Smith
2009	Colin Groshong (cox)
2012	Zoe de Toledo (cox)
2019	Augustin Wambersie
2021	Augustin Wambersie
2022	Angus Groom
2023	Freddy Orpin

Women's boat race

Year	Name
2018	Morgan McGovern
