= Pembroke College Boat Club =

Pembroke College Boat Club may refer to:

- Pembroke College Boat Club (Cambridge)
- Pembroke College Boat Club (Oxford)
