= Merton College Boat Club =

British rowing club

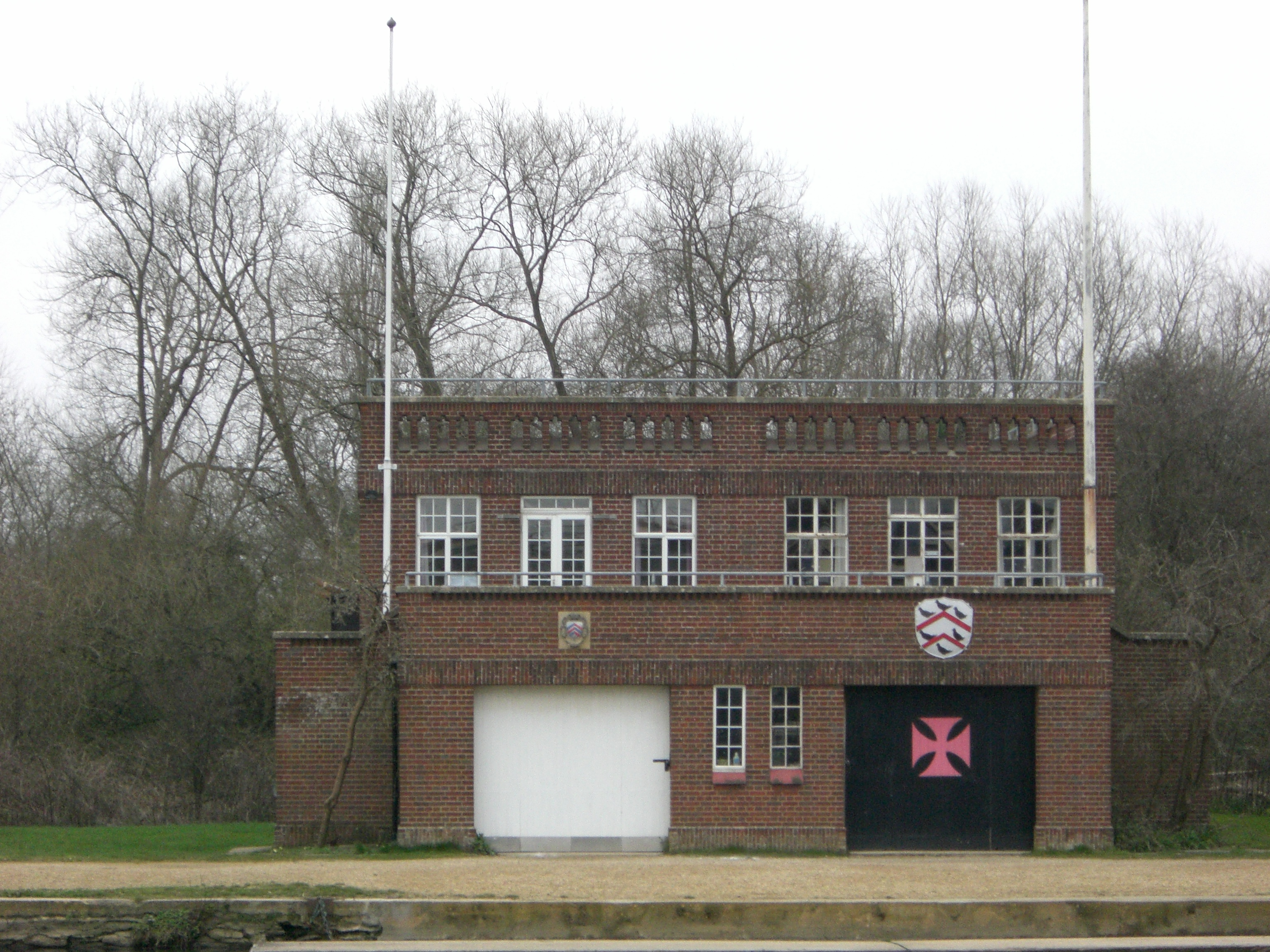

- The club's boathouse (left), The right side of the boathouse belongs to Worcester college and the blade colours (below the picture of the boathouse)
- Coordinates: 51.742759°N 1.248866°W
- Home water: Isis
- Founded: 1838
- Key people: Tessa Baker (Women's Captain); Rohan Crowe (Men's Captain); Isabella Hawkins-Curley (Women's Vice-Captain); Isaac Tan (Men's Vice Captain); Alfred McCullough (Captain of Coxes); Tabitha Whitehead (Women's Novice Captain); Otto Levenson (Men's Novice Captain); Ella Whittaker (Welfare and Water Safety Officer); Joshua Maisuria-Hull (Alumni and PR Officer); Samuele Salvatore (Social Secretary); Ti-Jean Martin (Social Secretary)
- Head of the River: Men: 1951
- Torpids: Men: 1927; Women: 2003, 2004
- University: University of Oxford
- Colours
- Affiliations: British Rowing (boat code MER); Peterhouse BC (Sister college)
- Website: www.mertoncollegeboatclub.co.uk

Merton College Boat Club (MCBC) is a rowing club for members of Merton College, Oxford. It was established in 1838 and competes every year in Torpids and Summer Eights, the intercollegiate bumps races at the University of Oxford, as well as external regattas.

The club shares a boat house with Worcester College Boat Club on Boathouse Island, on the northern bank of the Isis.

== The Club ==
Merton College Boat Club is run by a junior committee of current students at Merton who are guided by a Senior Member who is a current fellow of Merton. The committee reports to The Friends of Merton College Boat Club, a group of ex-rowers and alumni helping and supporting the boat club. Old members race every now and then on an ad-hoc basis as Merton Gannets, an alumni boat club that was founded in the 1950s.

== History ==
According to the Club archives, the boathouse, which is still in use today, was finished in 1949 and is the last in the row of college boathouses built in the distinctive brick style mirroring the first boathouse built on the Isis stretch by Christ Church in the 1920s. Currently plans are under way to extend the boathouse and funds are being raised for the project.

Merton competed successfully at Henley, winning two events, the Visitor's Challenge Cup, for coxless fours at the time, in 1920 and 1956. Additionally, Merton reached the final in the Ladies Challenge Plate in 1920. One member, Mr J L Bland, rowed in the Grand Challenge Cup winning OUBC/Thames Tradesmen's Rowing Club crew of 1981.

Merton College Boat Club has fielded numerous ‘Blues’. Between 2005 and 2014 Merton produced more female crew members representing the university than any other college. Members of the club have also taken on the presidency of both the Oxford University Lightweight Rowing Club and the Oxford University Women's Lightweight Rowing Club multiple times.

== Honours ==
=== Henley Royal Regatta ===
Year	Winning crew
1920	Visitors' Challenge Cup
1956	Visitors' Challenge Cup

=== Boat Race representatives ===
The following rowers were part of the rowing club at the time of their participation in The Boat Race.

Men's boat race

Year	Name
1839	Berdmore Compton
1840	Jacob G. Mountain
1841	I. J. J. Pocock
1845	W. C. Stapylton
1846	W. U. Heygate
1846	W. C. Stapylton
1865	R. T. Raikes
1866	R. T. Raikes
1866	W. Freeman
1867	R. G. Mardsen
1868	R. G. Mardsen
1874	A. R. Harding
1892	F. E. Robeson
1904	R. W. Somers-Smith
1905	R. W. Somers-Smith
1905	H. C. Bucknall
1905	L. P. Stedall (cox)
1906	H. C. Bucknall
1906	L. P. Stedall (cox)
1907	H. C. Bucknall
1920	D. T. Raikes
1921	D. T. Raikes
1922	A. C. Irvine
1922	D. T. Raikes

Year	Name
1922	G. Milling
1923	A. C. Irvine
1948	R. L. Arundel
1949	R. L. Arundel
1952	N. W. Sanders
1952	C. D. Milling
1952	H. M. C. Quick
1953	A. J. Smith
1953	H. M. C. Quick
1954	R. D. T. Raikes
1954	H. M. C. Quick
1955	R. D. T. Raikes
1956	B. S. Mawer
1957	A. H. Stearns
1958	R. Rubin
1972	E. Yalouris (cox)
1973	E. Yalouris (cox)
1980	J. L. Bland
1981	J. L. Bland
1983	J. L. Bland
1986	G. R. Screaton
2025	Daniel Orton (cox)
