= Worcester College Boat Club =

British rowing club

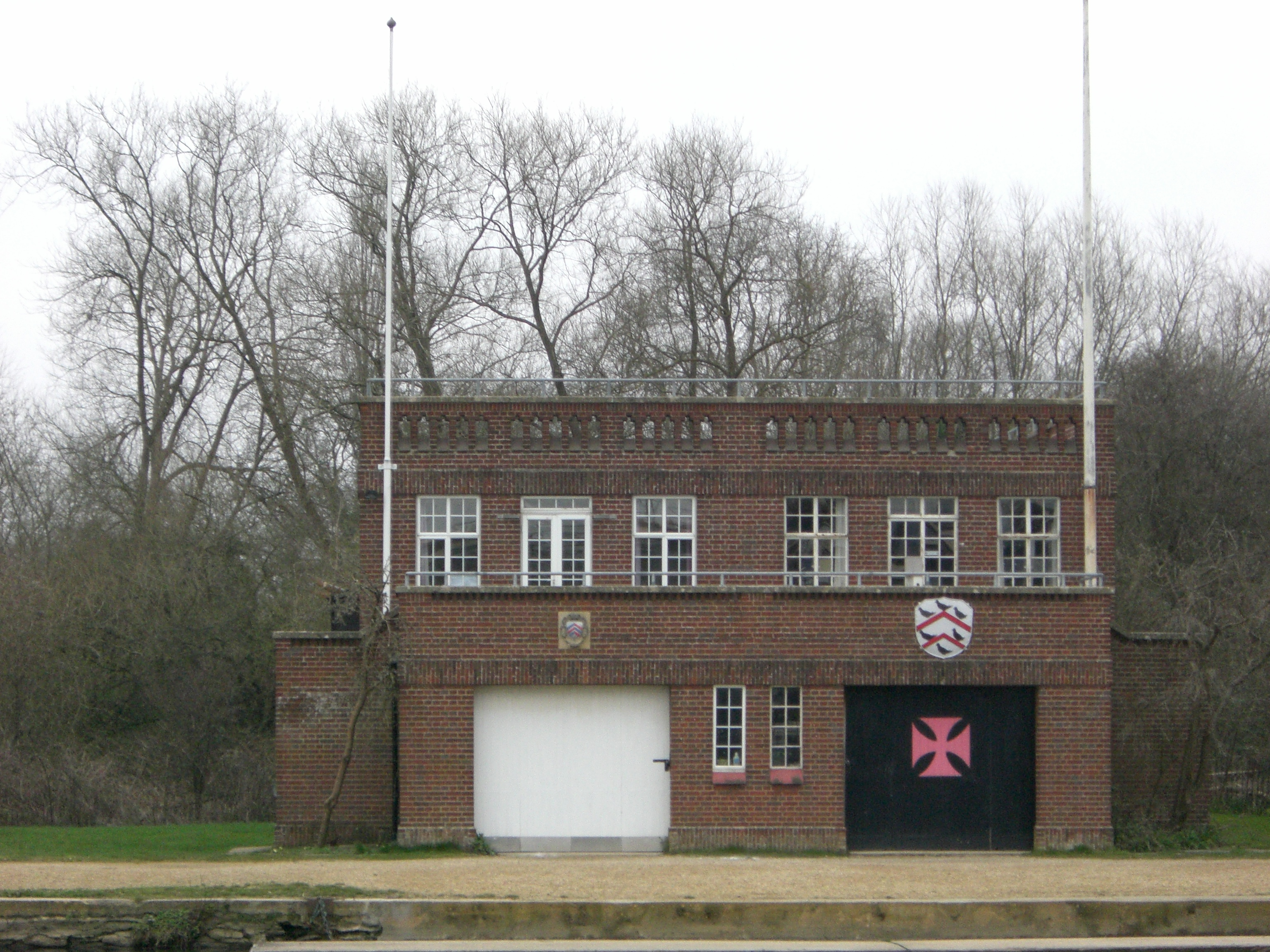

- Boathouse (right) building shared with Merton
- Location: Boathouse Island, Christ Church Meadow, Oxford, Oxford
- Coordinates: 51.742756°N 1.248819°W
- Home water: The Isis
- Founded: 1825
- University: University of Oxford
- Affiliations: British Rowing (boat code WRO); St Catharine's College BC (Sister college)
- Website: wcbc.worc.ox.ac.uk

Worcester College Boat Club (WCBC) is a rowing club for members of Worcester College, Oxford. It is based on the Isis at Boathouse Island, Christ Church Meadow, Oxford, Oxford.

== History ==
The club was founded in 1825 and shares the boathouse building with Merton College Boat Club. In 1825 the club competed in bumps racing with Jesus, Brasenose, Christ Church and Exeter. The Alumni are known as Martlets.

== Honours ==
=== Henley Royal Regatta ===
Year	Races won
1922	Thames Challenge Cup
1927	Diamond Challenge Sculls

=== Boat Race representatives ===
The following rowers were part of the rowing club at the time of their participation in The Boat Race.

Men's boat race

Year	Name
1829	T. F. Garnier
1849	J. J. Sykes
1849	J. J. Sykes
1854	Alfred Hooke
1867	E. S. Carter
1868	E. S. Carter
1871	E. C. Malan
1872	E. C. Malan
1876	W. D. Craven (cox)
1922	J. E. Pedder
1923	J. E. Pedder
1924	J. E. Pedder
1927	N. E. Whiting
1927	A. M. Hankin
1928	N. E. Whiting
1931	E. R. Edmett (cox)
1932	W. H. Migotti
1932	E. R. Edmett (cox)

Year	Name
1933	W. H. Migotti
1934	W. H. Migotti
1934	C. G. F. Bryan (cox)
1935	C. G. F. Bryan (cox)
1957	R. L. Howard
1959	R. L. Howard
1969	K. M. Gee
1973	J. S. Ollivant
1985	B. M. Philp
1986	M. R. Dunstan
1986	B. M. Philp
1992	Simon Davy
1994	Harry J. MacMillan
1999	Toby H. Ayer
2000	Toby H. Ayer
2007	Magnus Fleming

Women's boat race

Year	Name
2019	Tina Christmann
2023	Laurel Kaye

== See also ==
- University rowing (UK)
- Oxford University Boat Club
- Rowing on the River Thames
