= Thames Challenge Cup =

Event at the annual Henley Royal Regatta

- Venue: Henley Royal Regatta, River Thames
- Location: Henley-on-Thames, Oxfordshire
- Dates: 1868 – present

The Thames Challenge Cup is a rowing event for men's eights at the annual Henley Royal Regatta on the River Thames at Henley-on-Thames in England. It is open to male crews from a single rowing club.

Boat clubs from any university, college or secondary school are not permitted, neither are squad oarsmen seeking selection for F.I.S.A. Heavyweight or Lightweight Championships. A crew may not include oarsmen who have rowed or sculled in an Olympic Games or a F.I.S.A. Senior World Championships for Heavyweights or Lightweights or who have won a medal at World Under 23 Championships (or the World Under 23 Regatta or The Nations' Cup).

== Past winners ==
=== 1868–1939 ===
Year	Winner	Runner-up	ref
1868	Pembroke College, Oxford	Radley College Boat Club	
1869	Oscillators Club, Surbiton	row over	
1870	Oscillators Club, Kingston	London Rowing Club	
1871	Ino Rowing Club	London Rowing Club	
1872	Thames Rowing Club	London Rowing Club	
1873	Thames Rowing Club	London Rowing Club	
1874	Thames Rowing Club	London Rowing Club	
1875	London Rowing Club	West London Rowing Club	
1876	West London Rowing Club	London Rowing Club	
1877	London Rowing Club	Thames Rowing Club	
1878	London Rowing Club	Ino Rowing Club	
1879	Twickenham Rowing Club	London Rowing Club	
1880	London Rowing Club	Twickenham Rowing Club	
1881	Twickenham Rowing Club	Eton College Boat Club	
1882	Royal Chester Rowing Club	Reading Rowing Club	
1883	London Rowing Club	West London Rowing Club	
1884	Twickenham Rowing Club	Thames Rowing Club	
1885	London Rowing Club	Thames Rowing Club	
1886	London Rowing Club	Thames Rowing Club	
1887	Trinity Hall, Cambridge	Thames Rowing Club	
1888	Lady Margaret Boat Club	Thames Rowing Club	
1889	Christ Church Boat Club	London Rowing Club	
1890	Thames Rowing Club	Molesey Boat Club	
1891	Molesey Boat Club	Thames Rowing Club	
1892	Jesus College, Cambridge	Trinity College Dublin	
1893	Thames Rowing Club	Eton College Boat Club & Eton Excelsior Rowing Club	
1894	Trinity College, Oxford	London Rowing Club	
1895	Nereus Rowing Club	Molesey Boat Club	
1896	Emmanuel College, Cambridge	Societe d’Encouragement du Sport Nautique, FRA	
1897	Kingston Rowing Club	Christ Church Boat Club	
1898	Trinity College, Oxford	First Trinity, Cambridge	
1899	First Trinity, Cambridge	Kingston Rowing Club	
1900	Trinity College, Cambridge	Trinity College Dublin	
1901	Trinity Hall, Cambridge	Kingston Rowing Club	
1902	Trinity Hall, Cambridge	Royal School of Mines	
1903	Trinity College Dublin	Kingston Rowing Club	
1904	Caius College, Cambridge	St. John's College, Oxford	
1905	Thames Rowing Club	Kingston Rowing Club	
1906	Christ's College, Cambridge	First Trinity, Cambridge	
1907	Christ's College, Cambridge	Corpus Christi College, Cambridge	
1908	Wadham College Boat Club	Christ Church Boat Club	
1909	Wadham College Boat Club	Oriel College, Oxford	
1910	Anglian Boat Club	Clare College, Cambridge	
1911	First Trinity, Cambridge	Twickenham Rowing Club	
1912	Rowing Club de Paris, FRA	St. John's College, Oxford	
1913	Oriel College, Oxford	Christ's College, Cambridge	
1914	Caius College, Cambridge	Jesus College, Cambridge	
1915–1919 no races due to World War I
1920	Thames Rowing Club	Caius College, Cambridge	
1921	Christiania RK, Norway	Corpus Christi College, Cambridge	
1922	Worcester College, Oxford	Clare College, Cambridge	
1923	First Trinity, Cambridge	Maidenhead Rowing Club	
1924	Maidenhead Rowing Club	Twickenham Rowing Club	
1925	First Trinity, Cambridge	Henley Rowing Club	
1926	Selwyn College, Cambridge	Kingston Rowing Club	
1927	Thames Rowing Club	Twickenham Rowing Club	
1928	Thames Rowing Club	Twickenham Rowing Club	
1929	Browne & Nichols School, USA	Thames Rowing Club	
1930	Vesta Rowing Club	Worcester College, Oxford	
1931	London Rowing Club	Magdalen College, Oxford	
1932	London Rowing Club	Imperial College Boat Club	
1933	Kent School, USA	Bedford Rowing Club	
1934	Thames Rowing Club	London Rowing Club	
1935	London Rowing Club	Pembroke College, Cambridge	
1936	Tabor Academy	Kent School, USA	
1937	Tabor Academy	London Rowing Club	
1938	Kent School, USA	London Rowing Club	
1939	Tabor Academy	Kent School, USA	
1940–1945 no races due to World War II

==== Gallery ====
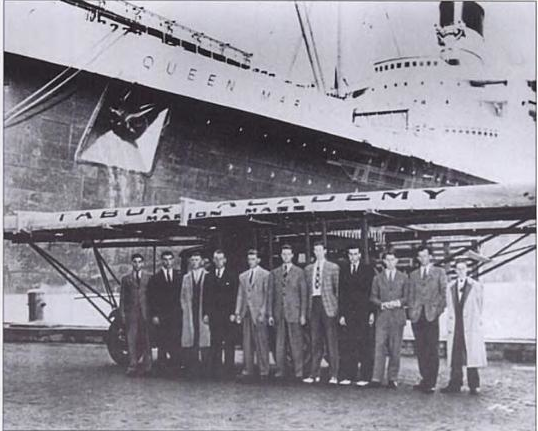
The Tabor Academy boarding the Queen Mary in 1939. They returned home as the champions of the regatta for the third time in four years.

=== 1946–1999 ===
Year	Winner	Runner-up	ref
1946	Imperial College Boat Club	Isis Boat Club	
1947	Kent School, USA	Tabor Academy	
1948	Princeton University, USA	Royal Air Force Rowing Club	
1949	Princeton University, USA	Lady Margaret Boat Club	
1950	Kent School, USA	Thames Rowing Club	
1951	University Pennsylvania, USA	Ruder. Florsheim-Russelshein, GER	
1952	University Pennsylvania, USA	Christ's College, Cambridge	
1953	Royal Air Force Rowing Club	Imperial College Boat Club	
1954	Massachusetts Institute of Technology, USA	Royal Navy	
1955	Massachusetts Institute of Technology, USA	Royal Air Force Rowing Club	
1956	Princeton University, USA	Royal Air Force Rowing Club	
1957	Princeton University, USA	National Provincial Bank Rowing Club	
1958	Harvard University USA	Thames Rowing Club	
1959	Harvard University USA	University of London Boat Club	
1960	Harvard University USA	Detroit Boat Club, USA	
1961	University of London Boat Club	Jesus College, Cambridge	
1962	National Provincial Bank Rowing Club	Thames Rowing Club	
1963	Queens' College, Cambridge	Argosies Rowing Club	
1964	Eliot House, Harvard, USA	London Rowing Club	
1965	Isis Boat Club	Nottingham Britannia Rowing Club	
1966	Harvard University USA	Isis Boat Club	
1967	Cornell University, USA	Nottingham & Union Rowing Club	
1968	Leander Club	Cornell University, USA	
1969	Leander Club	University of Pennsylvania	
1970	Leander Club	London Rowing Club	
1971	Harvard University USA	Kingston Rowing Club	
1972	Harvard University USA	Kingston Rowing Club	
1973	Princeton University, USA	Thames Tradesmen's Rowing Club	
1974	Quintin Boat Club	Rob Roy Boat Club	
1975	Garda Siochana Boat Club, IRL	Harvard University USA	
1976	Harvard University USA	Henley Rowing Club	
1977	London Rowing Club	Leander Club	
1978	London Rowing Club	Leander Club	
1979	Leander Club	London Rowing Club	
1980	University of London Boat Club	London Rowing Club	
1981	Charles River Rowing Association, USA	London Rowing Club	
1982	Charles River Rowing Association, USA	Goldie Boat Club	
1983	University of London Boat Club	Koninklijke Rv Sport Gent, Belgium	
1984	Cantabrigian Rowing Club	Leander Club	
1985	Ridley College, CAN	University College Dublin, IRL	
1986	Ridley College, CAN	Imperial College Boat Club	
1987	University College Galway, IRL	Neptune Rowing Club, IRL	
1988	Tideway Scullers School	Thames Rowing Club	
1989	University of London Boat Club	Ridley College, CAN	
1990	Nottinghamshire County Rowing Association	Harvard University USA	
1991	University of Pennsylvania	University of London Boat Club	
1992	Lea Rowing Club	Goldie Boat Club	
1993	Nottinghamshire County Rowing Association	Isis Boat Club	
1994	Brown University, USA	Goldie Boat Club	
1995	Imperial College Boat Club	University of Washington, USA	
1996	Neptune Rowing Club, IRL	Wallingford Rowing Club	
1997	Nottingham Boat Club	Neptune Rowing Club, IRL	
1998	London Rowing Club	Bowbridge Boat Club	
1999	Molesey Boat Club "A"	Crabtree Boat Club	

=== 2000 onwards ===
Year	Winner	Runner-up	ref
2000	Molesey Boat Club 'A'	Crabtree Boat Club	
2001	Royal Club Nautique de Gand, BEL	Thames Rowing Club 'A'	
2002	Leander Club	Nottinghamshire County Rowing Association 'A'	
2003	Homberger Ruderklub, GER	London Rowing Club 'A'	
2004	London Rowing Club 'A'	Ruderclub Reuss Luzern, SUI	
2005	Henley Rowing Club	Lady Elizabeth Boat Club, IRL	
2006	London Rowing Club 'A'	Tideway Scullers School	
2007	Leander Club	Agecroft Rowing Club	
2008	Leander Club	Tideway Scullers School	
2009	Molesey Boat Club	Henley Rowing Club	
2010	1829 Boat Club	West End Rowing Club	
2011	Upper Yarra Rowing Club, AUS	Star Club	
2012	Molesey Boat Club	Thames Rowing Club 'A'	
2013	Griffen Boat Club	Upper Thames Rowing Club 'A'	
2014	Frankfurter Rudergesellschaft Germania 1869, GER	Sport Imperial Boat Club	
2015	Thames Rowing Club 'A'	Ruder Tennis Hockey Club Bayer Leverkusen, GER	
2016	Molesey Boat Club 'A'	Norske Studenters Roklub Oslo, NOR	
2017	Thames Rowing Club 'A'	Thames Rowing Club 'B'	
2018	Thames Rowing Club 'A'	Norske Studenters Roklub Oslo, NOR	
2019	Roeivereniging van Studenten aan de Vrije Universiteit 'Okeanos', NED	Thames Rowing Club 'A'	
2020	No competition due to COVID-19 pandemic		
2021	Thames Rowing Club 'A'	Molesey Boat Club 'A'	
2022	Molesey Boat Club 'A'	Thames Rowing Club 'A'	
2023	Thames Rowing Club 'A'	Koninklijke Amsterdamsche Roei- en Zeilvereeniging 'De Hoop', NED	
2024	Thames Rowing Club 'A'	Koninklijke Amsterdamsche Roei- en Zeilvereeniging 'De Hoop', NED	
2025	London Rowing Club 'A'	Thames Rowing Club 'A'	
2026	Thames Rowing Club 'A'	London Rowing Club 'A'	

==== Gallery ====
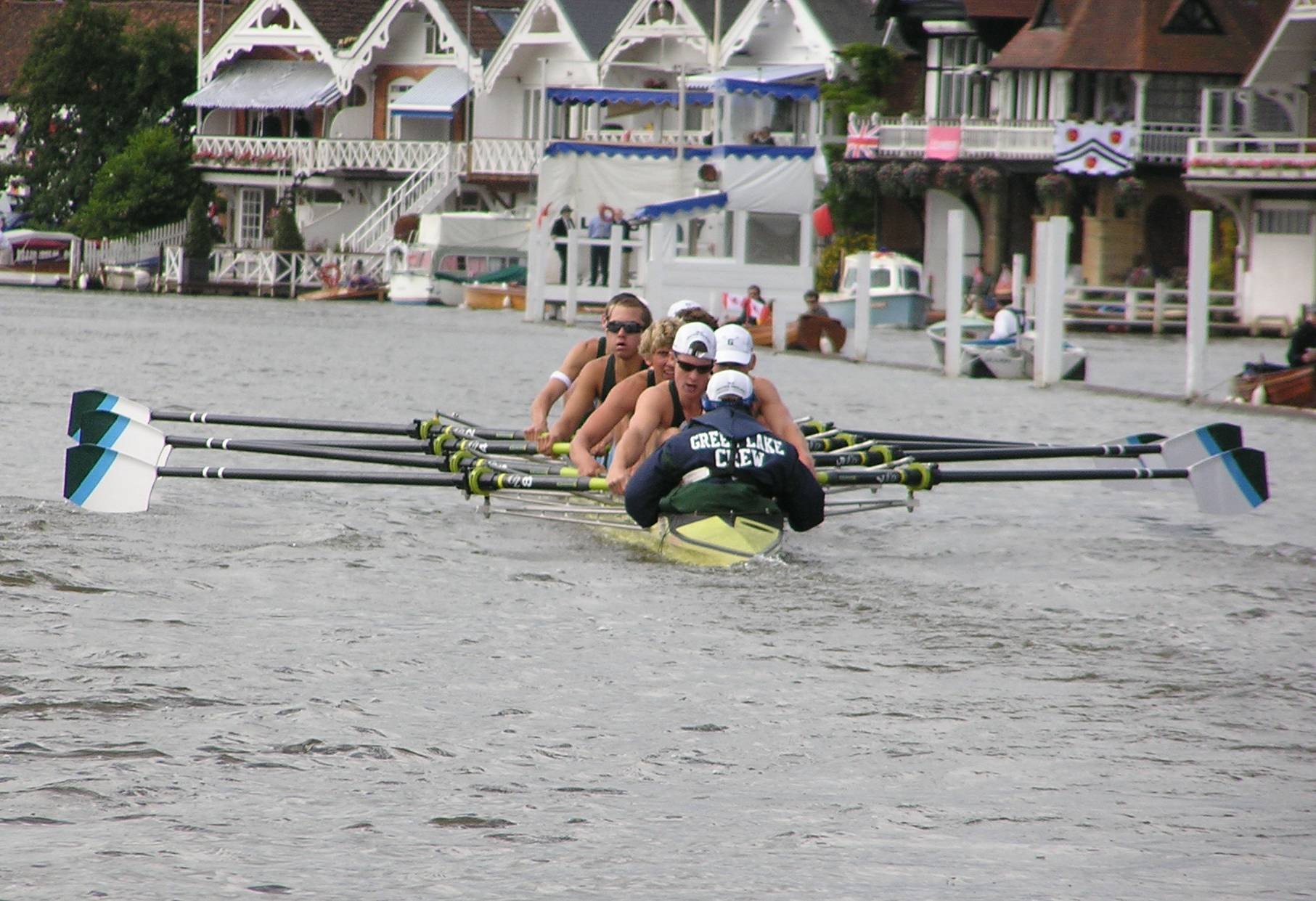
Green Lake Crew from Seattle compete in the 2007 Thames Challenge Cup
