= The Queen's College Boat Club =

British rowing club

The Queen's College Boat Club, Oxford
- Home water: The Isis
- Founded: 1827
- Key people: Kush Melwani (President); Lydia Pinches (Vice President); Anais Schadinsky-Hammes, Cara McDade (Women's Captains); James Trowbridge, Jack Harper-Hill (Men's Captains); Daisy Robins (Captain of Coxes)
- University: University of Oxford
- Colours
- Affiliations: British Rowing (boat code QCO); Pembroke College, Cambridge (Sister college)
- Acronym: QCBC

Distinctions
- Head of the River Men: 1833, 1837, 1958; Torpids Men: 1957, 1958

The Queen's College Boat Club (abbreviated QCBC) is the rowing club for members of The Queen's College, Oxford. It is one of the oldest boat clubs in the world, having been founded in 1827. They also represent Wycliffe Hall.

== History ==
In 1837, the club represented Oxford in a race against Lady Margaret Boat Club, representing Cambridge, and won. This event, held on the River Thames at Henley-on-Thames, is credited with leading to support from the town for the establishment of the Henley Royal Regatta.

The club was last Head of the River in Eights in 1957 and in Torpids in 1958.

A women's boat first competed in 1981 after admission of women to the college. It has since risen to as high as 2nd on the river during the 2006 Torpids competition and 10th on the river during Summer Eights 2005.

In recent years the men's first and second boats have risen steadily through the rankings of Summer Eights with the first eight now positioned at 16th on the river and second eight at 52nd as of 2023. Notably, both boats achieved 'blades' (bumping on each day of the competition) in both the 2015 and 2017 regattas.

The Women's first boat recently achieved 'blades' in Torpids 2023, breaking the QCBC women's record by rising 6 places in a single bumps campaign. Their success was followed by achieving 'blades' a second time in their Summer VIIIs campaign. Once again breaking another record by securing double blades in a year, a first for the women’s side in the boat club’s history.

== Honours ==
=== Boat Race representatives ===
The following rowers were part of the rowing club at the time of their participation in The Boat Race.

Men's boat race

Year	Name
1839	Stanlake Lee
1869	T. S. Baker
1870	T. S. Baker
1871	T. S. Baker
1887	A. F. Titherington
1914	G. W. Titherington
1921	P. C. Mallam
1922	P. C. Mallam
1923	P. C. Mallam

Year	Name
1924	P. C. Mallam
1927	H. T. Kingsbury
1946	J. M. Barrie
1947	A. Palgrave-Brown (cox)
1949	A. Palgrave-Brown (cox)
1956	K. L. Mason
1957	K. L. Mason
1976	S. G. H. Plunkett

== See also ==
- Torpids
- Summer Eights
