= Nick Bevan =

British rowing coach and headmaster

- Born: 21 February 1942; Shrewsbury, England
- Died: 12 January 2014 (aged 71); Oxford, England

Nicholas Vaughan Bevan (21 February 1942 – 12 January 2014) was a leading British rowing coach and school headmaster.

== Early life ==
Nick Bevan was born at the Limes Nursing Home in Shrewsbury, England, the son of David and Hilary Bevan. He was educated at Shrewsbury School where his father taught for 42 years and was a housemaster. Bevan then studied geography at Balliol College, Oxford. He rowed for Oxford University in the 1963 Boat Race, coming from behind to beat Cambridge University. While at Oxford, he taught the future King of Norway, Harald V, to row.

== Career ==
In 1963, Bevan joined the King's Shropshire Light Infantry in the British Army. He was stationed at British Honduras, Plymouth, Singapore, Malaya, and Mauritius. He resigned from the Army in 1968 studied for a Certificate of Education at St John's College, Cambridge. Bevan taught at Westminster School from 1971, coaching rowing at the school, winning the British Schools' Head of the River Race in that year. He then moved back to teach at Shrewsbury School, becoming a housemaster like his father. In 1988, he became headmaster of Shiplake College near Henley-on-Thames.

Bevan retired in 2004, moving to North Aston, but continued his involvement with rowing. He was on the management committee of the British National Schools' Regatta, and coached for St Edward's School, Oxford and the women's eight of Balliol College, also in Oxford.

== Personal life ==
Bevan married Jane Tildesley in 1967 and after this was dissolved Annabel O'Connor in 1978. He had four children. Bevan suffered from a stroke in September 2013 due to renal cancer. He died at John Radcliffe Hospital, Oxford, England.
