= Corpus Christi College Boat Club (Oxford) =

British rowing club

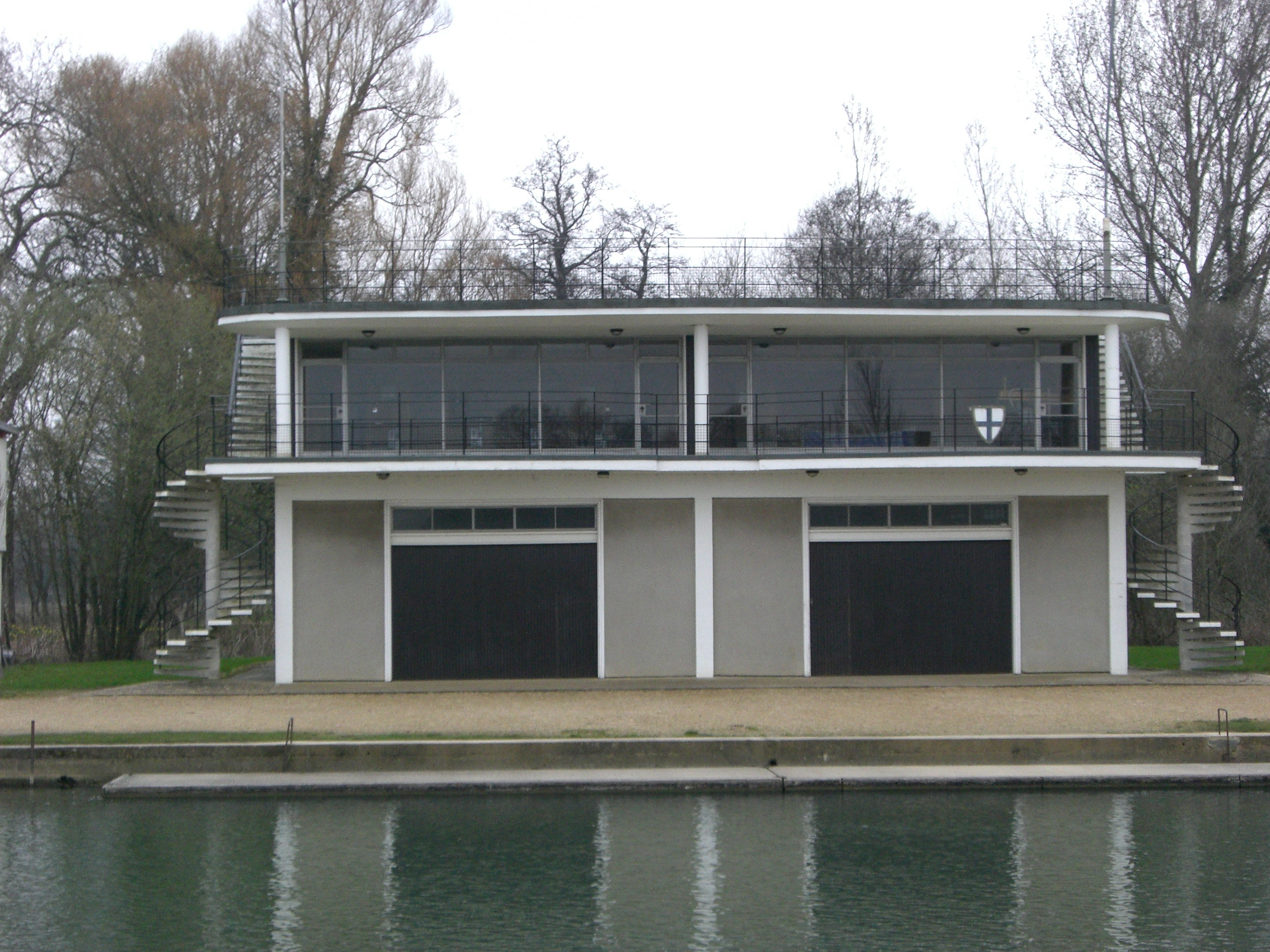

- Boathouse on left (building shared with St John's College Boat Club)
- Location: Boathouse Island, Christ Church Meadow, Oxford, Oxford
- Coordinates: 51.743659°N 1.250099°W
- Home water: The Isis
- Founded: 1858
- Membership: approx 35
- University: University of Oxford
- Affiliations: British Rowing (boat code COO)
- Website: cccbcox.co.uk

Corpus Christi College Boat Club (Oxford) (CCCBC) is a rowing club for members of Corpus Christi College, Oxford. It is based on the Isis at Boathouse Island, Christ Church Meadow, Oxford, Oxford.

The club was founded in 1858 but has history dating back to 1833 when John Peard built Corpus their first four. The Women's Boat Club was founded in 1978, largely through the efforts of Eleanor (Leo) Sharpston. The women's second eight (formerly the first eight) boat, a 2005 Stampfli, is named 'Leo Sharpston' in her honour.

== History ==
A large amount of the club's history is recorded in the college's Pelican Record, however significant amounts of information have been lost through the loss of the captains' diaries over the years.

=== 1833 - 1900 ===
'1833 was the first year when little Corpus ever had a four on the river; and when the time for the first race arrived they had neglected to provide themselves with a flag. It was ruled that they would not race without some sort of flag, so one of the crew produced a red pocket handkerchief, which was allowed to do duty'

In 1834-35 the four built by Peard went head of the river. John Peard, known as Garibaldi's Englishman, lived at Plymouth and superintended the building of the new boat.

Corpus have had many representatives in the Boat Race since 1857 (R. Martin). The club continued development as a men's college sport throughout the 1800s, reaching Head of the River in Eights twice, and twice again in Torpids, before 1900. In the early days of bumps racing, Corpus could be commonly found at the Bottom and Head of the River in quick succession.

In 1899, Corpus entered 'Varsity Fours', along with Magdalen and Balliol. Receiving a bye to the final, Corpus drew Magdalen, who passed them to come in first. J. C. Marsden, and T. C. Sinclair (3 and stroke, respectively) were selected for the winning Trial Eights crew of that same year.

Corpus had a number of representatives in OUBC crews at Henley and other international regattas throughout the years, notably R. Martin in the Grand in 1857, H. H. Woodward (cox) in the Grand and Stewards' Cup in 1867. At the British Regatta in Paris, in the same year, Corpus entered an eight, defeated by an eight of Old Etonians. A blade, belonging to the strokeman R. S. Bridges, from that race can now be found in the River and Rowing Museum in Henley.

Corpus also sent a representative to the 1869 Oxford-Harvard race, F. H. Hall (cox). This was raced over the championship course, and Oxford won 'easily'.

=== The College Barge ===
The first college barge was commissioned in 1854, with exterior design reminiscent of livery barges, with a 60–90 ft length and a large house structure placed upon a flat hull. In 1877, Corpus is recorded as having taken over the old University College barge. Significant repairs were made to the first barge in 1905, but it eventually degraded to such a state that the new barge was commissioned.

The current barge was built in 1930 by Salter Brothers Ltd, Oxford. It features characteristic rounded windows, and a flat steel hull. It is now moored in the Kidneys and under the care of Oxford College Barges Preservation Trust It was designed by Nathaniel Harrison FRIBA, a celebrated architect, and intended initially as a memorial barge of the Revd Joseph Hooper Maude, and his son, Louis Edward Joseph Maude, alumni of Corpus, who died at the Somme in 1916. A pelican was placed at the figurehead, with rectangular shields of the college arms and the Maude family (a lion rampant) along the line of the bow.

A new hull was placed on the barge in 1985, and from 1985 - 1997 the barge was used for student accommodation. The barge is now private accommodation, and has undergone a number of renovations since. As of July 2025, the Barge is undergoing renovation to restore the missing pelican figurehead, examine the flat hull, and repair other significant features.

=== 1978 - present ===
Corpus Christi College Women's Boat Club, or CCCWBC, was founded in 1978, being highly successful in their first appearance in Eights, with 5 recorded bumps, and blades. The crew was partially formed of Half-Blues and Blues.

In more recent years, Corpus have had several members race in the Lightweight Boat Races (2019, 2025).

== Honours ==
=== Boat Race representatives ===
The following rowers were part of the rowing club at the time of their participation in The Boat Race.

Men's boat race

Year	Name
1857	J. Martin
1860	J. F. Young
1861	H. G. Hopkins
1870	F. H. Hall (cox)
1871	F. H. Hall (cox)
1872	F. H. Hall (cox)
1876	F. R. Mercer
1880	C. W. Hunt (cox)
1882	R. S. de Haviland
1883	R. S. de Haviland
1884	C. R. Carter
1885	J. S. Clemons
1885	C. R. Carter
1886	C. R. Carter
1887	S. G. Williams
1889	H. E. L. Puxley

Year	Name
1890	H. E. L. Puxley
1904	A. J. S. H. Hales
1905	A. J. S. H. Hales
1935	D. M. de R. Winser
1936	D. M. de R. Winser
1937	D. M. de R. Winser
1973	P. D. P. Angier
1978	R. A. Crockford
1978	N. B. Rankov
1979	R. A. Crockford
1979	N. B. Rankov
1980	S. R. W. Francis
1980	N. B. Rankov
2003	Samuel McLennan

== See also ==
- University rowing (UK)
- Oxford University Boat Club
- Rowing on the River Thames
