= St John's College Boat Club (Oxford) =

British university rowing club

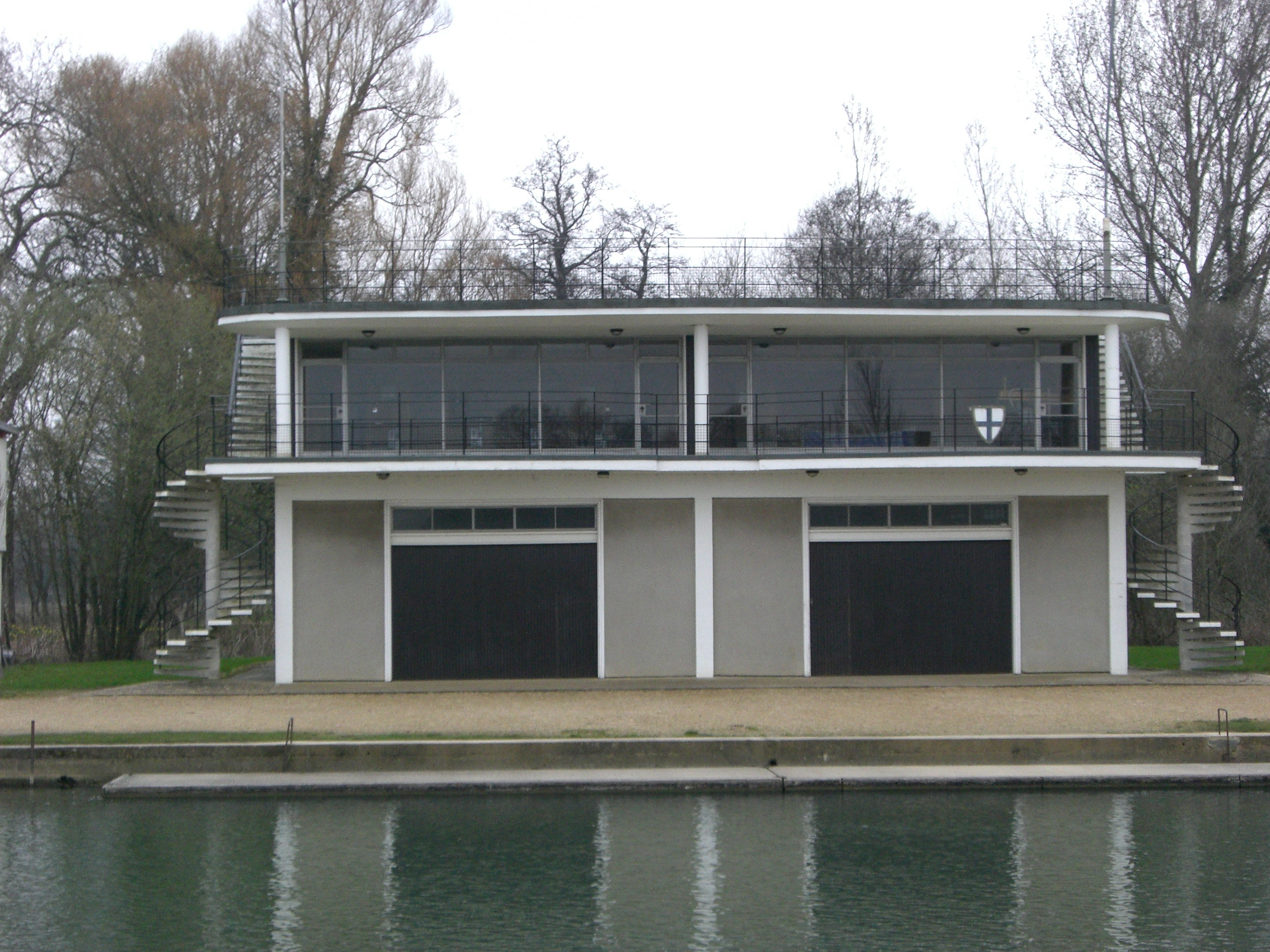

- Boathouse (right)
- Location: Christ Church Meadow, Oxford
- Home water: 51.743619°N 1.250184°W
- Founded: 1863
- Head of the River: Women: 2013
- Torpids Headship: Men's Torpids: 1946, 1961, 1967
- University: University of Oxford
- Colours
- Affiliations: British Rowing (boat code SJO); Sidney Sussex College, Cambridge (Sister college)
- Website: info.sjc.ox.ac.uk/socs/sjcbc

St John's College Boat Club, Oxford (SJCBC) is a rowing club part of the University of Oxford, England, located on the River Thames at Oxford. The club was founded in 1863.

== Colours ==
The St John's College Boat Club colours are a white shield with blue cross upon a navy blue background. The Men's 1st boats race in all-white uniform with blue trim and the 2nd crews compete in all-blue with white trim. The Women's boats race in all-black with blue trim. The Boat Club flag consists of a lamb carrying a flag atop a navy blue cross set against a white background. The symbol of the lamb and flag is that of St John the Baptist, after whom the college was named.

== History ==
Founded in 1862, the club was a regular competitor at the Henley Royal Regatta and won the Ladies' Challenge Plate in 1909, defeating First Trinity, Cambridge in the final.

In 1933, a group of undergraduates from the St Johns College Boat Club who were members of Oswald Mosley's British Union of Fascists were involved in the ceremonial burning of a page of the Oxford Union minute book. The page in question recorded the vote on 9 February 1933 in favour of a motion "That this House will in no circumstances fight for its King and Country."

== Honours ==
=== Henley Royal Regatta ===
Year	Races won
1909	Ladies' Challenge Plate

=== Boat Race representatives ===
The following rowers were part of the rowing club at the time of their participation in The Boat Race.

Men's boat race

Year	Name
1829	J. Carter
1836	George Carter
1842	W. B. Brewster
1846	E. H. Penfold
1846	John W. Conant
1846	C. J. Soanes +
1849	W. G. Rich
1849	C. J. Soanes +
1859	R. F. Clarke
1869	R. Tahourdin
1869	D. A Neilson +
1870	F. E. H. Payne
1871	F. E. H. Payne
1872	GF. E. H. Payne
1873	F. T. Dowding
1873	G. E. Frewer +
1874	H. J. Stayner
1875	H. J. Stayner
1876	H. J. Stayner

Year	Name
1877	D. J. Cowles
1877	H. J. Stayner
1878	D. J. Cowles
1908	A. E. Kitchin
1920	A. C. Hill
1936	K. V. Garside
1970	R. J. D. Gee
1988	Chris G Penny
1989	Richard Thorp
1990	Tom G. Slocock
1991	Richard C. Young
1992	Kingsley K. Poole
1993	Kinglsey K. Poole
1994	Joe G. Michels
1994	Kingsley K. Poole
2016	Jørgen Tveit
2024	Saxon Stacey

Key

- + = coxswain

== See also ==
- Oxford University Rowing Clubs
- University rowing (UK)
