= Pembroke College Boat Club (Oxford) =

British rowing club

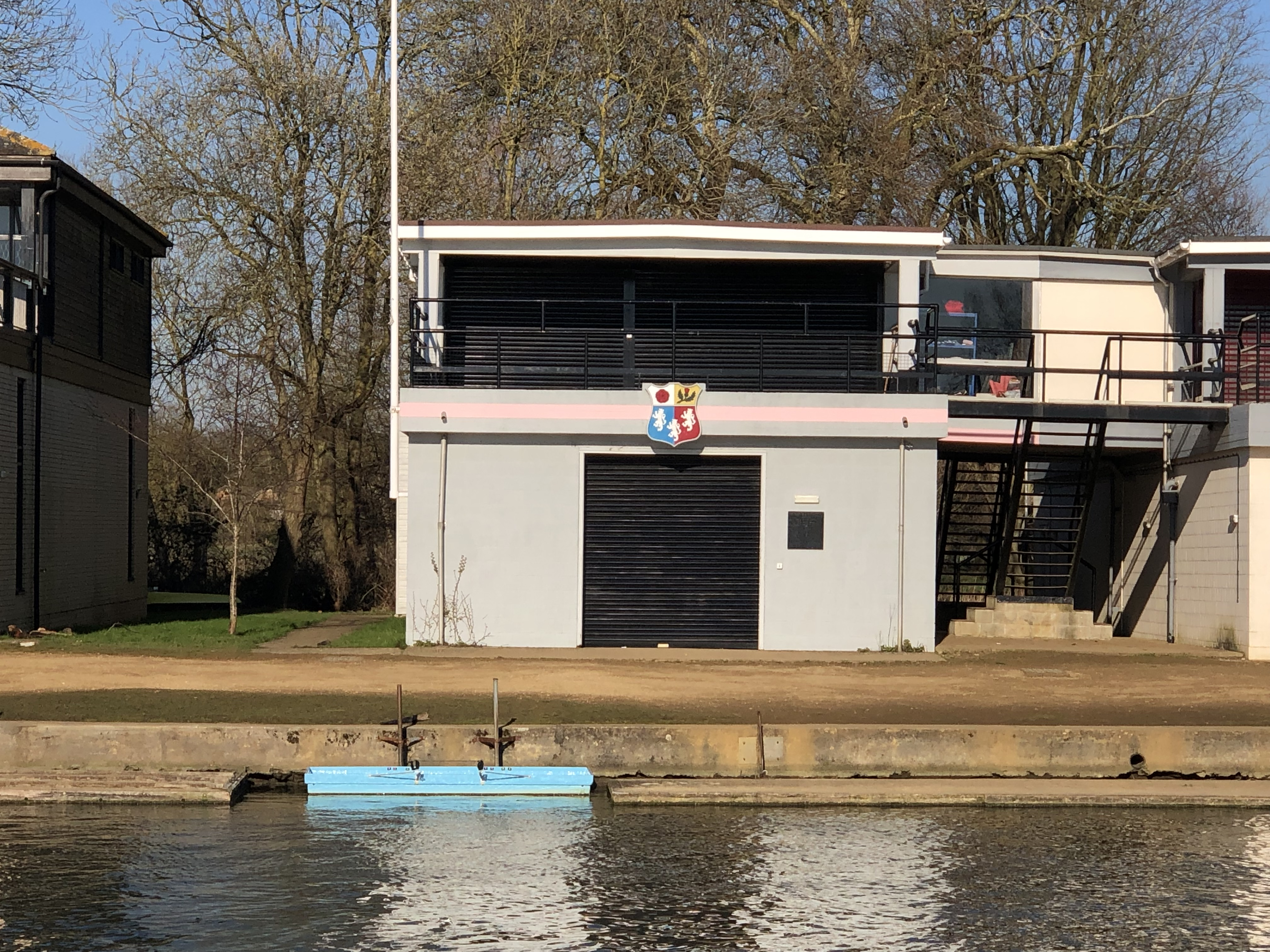

- Boathouse and rowing blade
- Home water: The Isis
- Founded: c. 1842
- Eights Week: Head of the River: Men: 1872, 1995, 2003, 2013; Women: 2000, 2001, 2002, 2003, 2012, 2018, 2025
- President: Daniel J. Foran
- University: University of Oxford
- Colours
- Affiliations: British Rowing (boat code PMB); Queens' College, Cambridge (Sister college)
- Website: pcbcoxford.org.uk

Pembroke College Boat Club (PCBC) is the rowing club for members of Pembroke College, Oxford, one of the college boat clubs in Oxford.

PCBC is supported by the Friends of PCBC, particularly through their scholarship programme.

== History ==
Although the exact date for foundation of PCBC is unclear, the club was competing in Eights and Torpids as early as 1842 and had adopted its modern-day flag with the "Rose Gules" (Red Rose) taken from the Pembroke heraldic shield by 1846.

Amongst the giants in PCBC history, two leading Pembroke oarsmen of the 1870–1873 period were the three times President of the Oxford University Boat Club, Robert Lesley, who came up from Radley College and R S Mitchison, an old Etonian. Rowing historians indicate that sliding seats were first used during the Fours racing at Oxford in 1872 by PCBC and that “the new system of sliding seats was first used in Oxford by Lesley’s crew and also by the College (Pembroke) Eight at Henley “. Pembroke were the first known crew to use seats with wheels. In the club minutes it is recorded that the Pembroke crew were the pioneers of the sliding seat at Oxford, using it in the Fours before they left for Henley, and of the seat with wheels for the first time worldwide.

Dodd states that London Rowing Club and Pembroke were the first to use the sliding seat at Henley. Pembroke's win of the Visitors’ Cup at Henley has been described as "one of the best races of the whole Regatta". Pembroke won by approximately half a length from University College Dublin, who were using fixed seats. The Dublin crew were regarded as one of the best ever sent to Henley. What is also significant is that Pembroke were using wheels, which were soon discarded by boat builders in favour of greased glass or steel grooves or tubes, but wheels were to return to favour again in 1885. Pembroke then, were not only early adopters of the sliding seat, ahead of others in Oxford, but also pioneers in terms of the materials being used, as they anticipated the later wheeled models of sliding seats which did not become current until 1885 and remain until the modern day.

In 2003, Pembroke achieved a historic victory in the Oxford Summer Eights competition by becoming the first college to win the 'Double Headship', having both men's and women's first boats end the week at the 'Head of the River'. Double Headship has yet to be repeated by any college in the Summer Eights competition, although the competitive years since 2003 has seen both men's and women's boats remain within striking distance of the Head of the River with the women gaining headship in 2018. Consistent ambition to go Head has been the goal: the Men's First Summer Eight (M1) has stayed within the top 5 since 1992.

The club has a reputation for good equipment and coaching, with a refurbished boathouse gym opening in the late 2010s.

In 2013 the M1 Torpid maintained its Headship with female double Olympic gold medallist Caryn Davies at stroke, and also gained the Eights Headship that year. The Women's First Eight was the first to gain Headship from another mixed college in 2000 and held that position for four straight years; they were Head of the River again in 2012 and 2018.

In 2025, the women's side became the first team to win headship for both Torpids and Summer Eights.The W1 Torpid achieved its first Headship in 2025 coxed by the three times World Champion and British Paralympic Gold medallist Erin Kennedy, who began coxing at the club in 2011.

== Coaching ==
Recent coaches have included Ben Lewis, current Thames Rowing Club coach; GB coach Rob Dauncey and GB lightweights Chris Bartley, Simon Jones and John Gearing (former-South African international). The current head coach is Laurence Whiteley MBE PLY.

== Honours ==
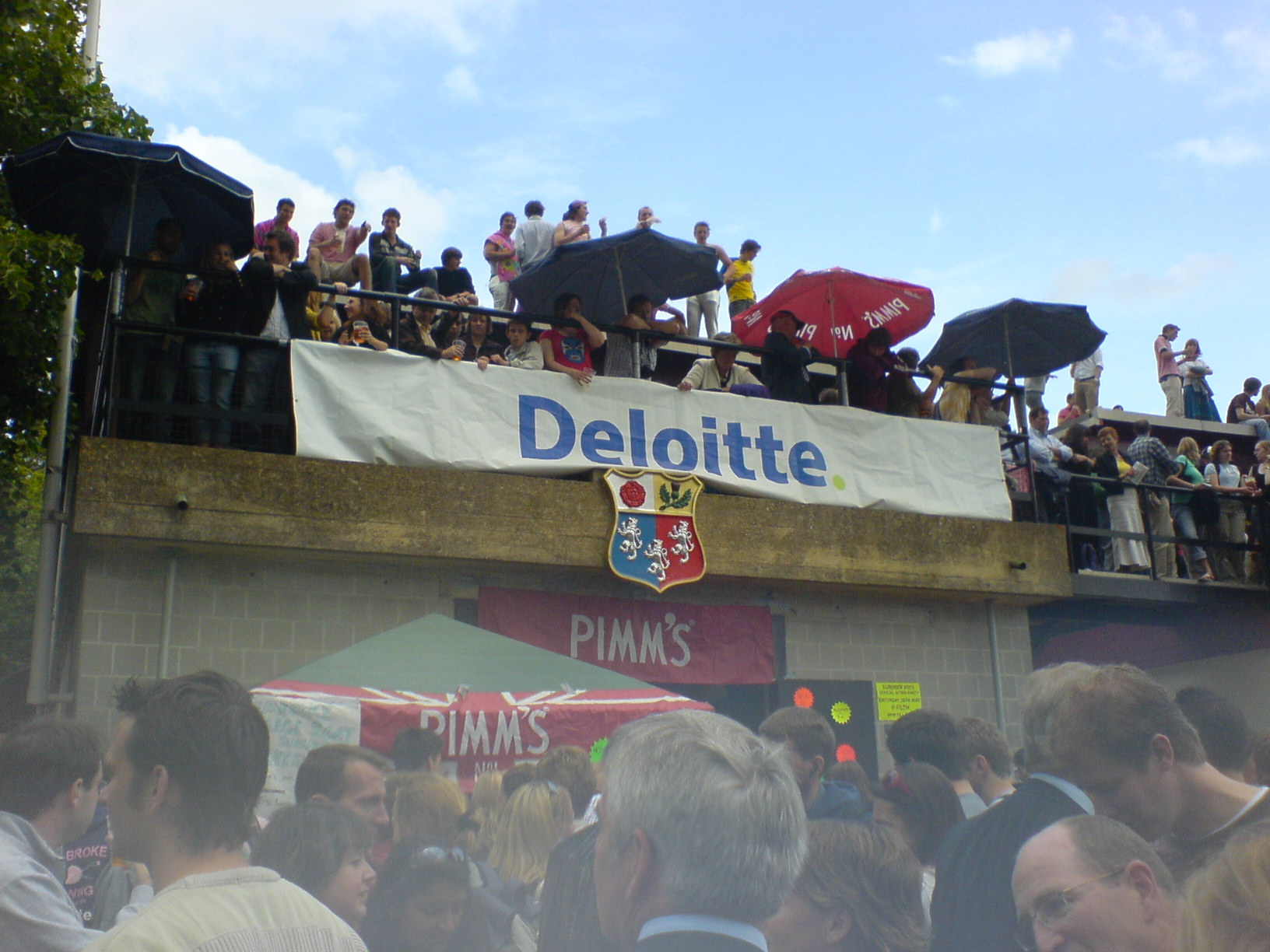
Pembroke College Boat House on the Isis during VIIIs Week 2007.

=== Headships ===
Eights

- Men: 1872, 1995, 2003, 2013
- Women: 2000, 2001, 2002, 2003, 2012, 2018, 2025

Torpids

- Men: 1858, 1877, 1878, 1879, 1999, 2000 (No racing), 2012, 2013, 2014 (No racing), 2015, 2016, 2017
- Women: 2025

=== Henley Royal Regatta ===
- Ladies' Challenge Plate, 1852, 1871
- Stewards' Challenge Cup, 1854
- Wyfold Challenge Cup, 1857
- Visitors' Challenge Cup, 1857, 1872
- Thames Challenge Cup, 1868

=== Boat Race representatives ===
The following rowers were part of the rowing club at the time of their participation in The Boat Race.

Men's boat race

Year	Name
1845	H. Lewis
1845	F. C. Royds
1846	H. S. Polehampton
1852	W. Olliver Meade King
1854	Edward Hooper
1854	W. Olliver Meade King
1856	Richard Townsend
1857	J. Arkell
1858	J. Arkell
1859	J. Arkell
1865	G. C. Coventry
1865	T. Wood
1871	R. Lesley
1872	R. S. Mitchison
1872	R. Lesley
1873	R. S. Mitchison
1875	H. M'd Courtney
1875	A. M. Mitchison
1876	H. M'd Courtney
1876	A. M. Mitchison

Year	Name
1878	H. B. Southwell
1879	H. B. Southwell
1880	H. B. Southwell
1906	C. H. Illingworth
1929	C. F. Juel-Brockdorff
1939	J. R. Bingham
1956	R. Barrett
1957	R. Barrett
1957	A. Said (cox)
1978	J. R. Crawford
1978	J. W. Wood
1979	J. R. Crawford
1982	S. J. L Foster
1984	J. A. G. H. Stewart
1985	A. M. S. Thomas
1986	A. M. S. Thomas
1989	G. Cheveley
1991	Hamish P. M. Hume
1992	Hamish P. M. Hume
1995	Jeremiah B. McLanahan

Year	Name
2000	Ben J. Burch
2000	Kajsa McLaren (cox)
2001	Ben J. Burch
2002	Basil Dixon
2002	Ben J. Burch
2003	Basil Dixon
2004	Basil Dixon
2006	Seb Pearce (cox)
2012	Alex Woods
2013	Patrick Close
2019	Anna Carbery (cox)
2021	James Forward
2021	Jesse Oberst (cox)
2023	James Forward
2026	Alex Underwood

Women's boat race

Year	Name
2015	Anastasia Chitty
2015	Jennifer Ehr (cox)
2016	Anastasia Chitty
2017	Florence Pickles
2022	Anastasia Posner
2024	Lucy Edmunds
2024	Annie Anezakis
2025	Annie Anezakis
2026	Annie Anezakis

== See also ==
- University rowing (UK)
