= Exeter College Boat Club =

British rowing club

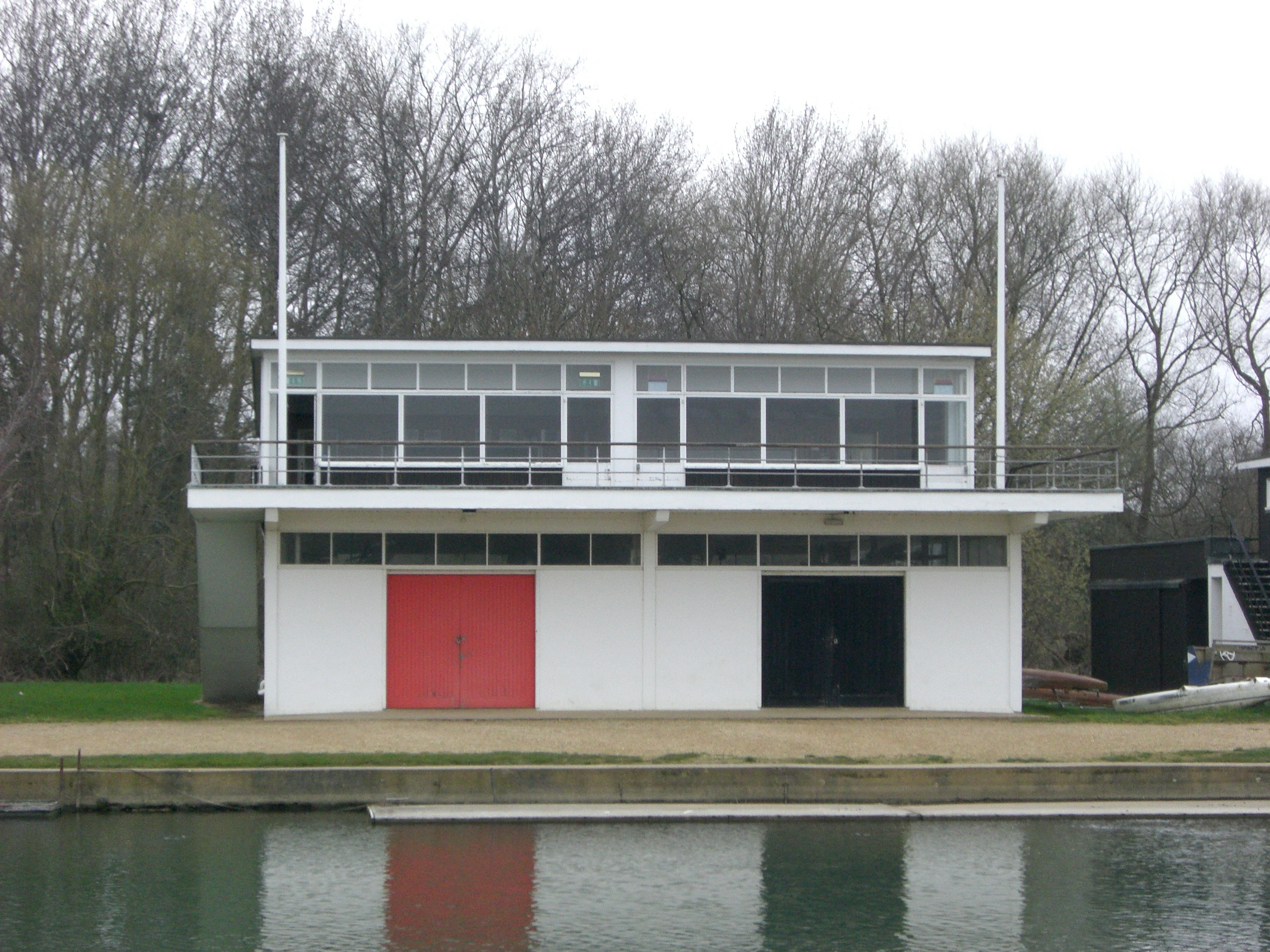

- Exeter College Boathouse (left half) and blade colours
- Coordinates: 51.7435°N 1.2499°W
- Home water: The Isis
- Founded: 1823 (formally)
- Key people: Ava Milne (President); Evariste Moquet (Openside Captain); Ophelia Robinson-Beesley (Women's Captain); Alec Harwood (Captain of Coxes)
- Head of the River: Men: 1824, 1838, 1857, 1858, 1882-84
- University: University of Oxford
- Colours
- Affiliations: British Rowing (boat code EXC); Emmanuel College, Cambridge (Sister college)
- Website: https://ecbc.web.ox.ac.uk/
- Acronym: ECBC

Exeter College Boat Club (ECBC) is the boat club of Exeter College, Oxford, England. The club trains on the Thames on the Isis stretch in Oxford and at Abingdon, Oxfordshire.

The Boat Club competes primarily in Torpids and Summer Eights (bumps races) in Oxford. However, it also races at various external events, such as Wallingford Regatta.

The college has a boathouse on Christ Church Meadow which it shares with Brasenose College Boat Club.

== History ==
The Exeter College Boat Club would appear to have been founded in 1823 or 1824 under the impetus of Henry Bulteel, who had been an undergraduate at Brasenose College, and stroked Brasenose to the headship in 1821 and 1822. Bulteel became a Fellow of Exeter College in 1823, and the Boat Club seems to have been formed at that time.

ECBC first took part in Summer Eights in 1824, with Bulteel stroking. That year they rowed in the famous "White Boat", which had been built in the Plymouth dockyard, and brought to Oxford by Brasenose College boatman, Stephen Davis. Being a coastal boat, it was found to sit too high out of the water to be rowed effectively on the Isis. The boat was therefore cut down to reduce the height of the gunwales, and it was in this boat that the College won its first headship in 1824.

From 1827-30 there was no Exeter eight on the river. The colours of the club, adopted around 1837 were red and black, the colours of the college arms. It was presumably these colours which were used for racing kerchiefs, recorded in the Exeter College Boat Club Treasurer's Book as being purchased in 1844. These were to be "kept peculiar to the racing crew" as opposed to other members of the College Boat Club.

In 1856 Exeter used the first keel-less boat on the river and in this they went head from 1857 until 1859. From twelfth place in 1879 they rose to fourth in 1881 and to Head in 1882. They kept the headship from 1882 to 1884 inclusive.

In 1882 Exeter won the Grand Challenge Cup at Henley Royal Regatta.

== Uniform ==
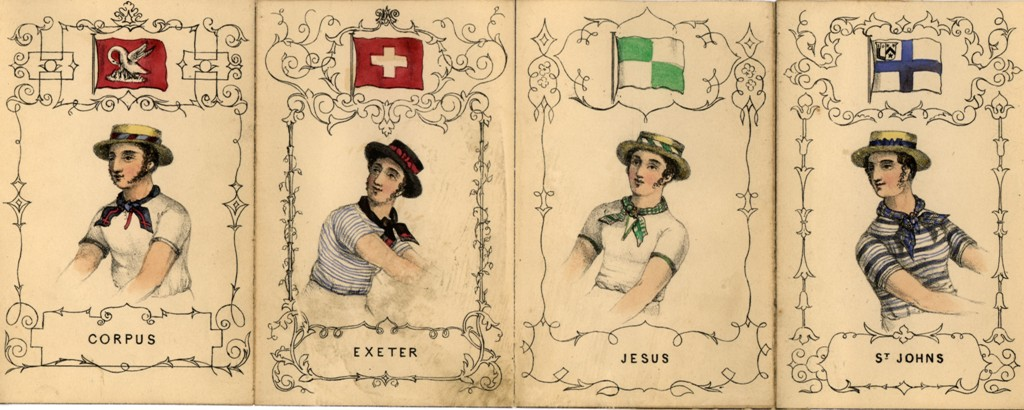
Exeter College Boat Club depicted in Vanity Fair in the 1840s

Exeter is associated with the colour red, which features prominently on its crest. The colour is used in racing kits, blazers, ties and blades.

The first known use of a tie in club colours was by members of Exeter College eight. In 1880, they took the ribbons off their boaters and tied them around their necks as a way to identify with their college.

Members who have raced in the first crews in Torpids are granted the right to wear this tie. Members who have raced in the first boats in Summer Eights are permitted to wear the club blazer. The blazer is peony red, with black trim. Captains are entitled to an extra stripe on the sleeve.

== Honours ==
=== Torpids ===
Headship

- Men: 1846-47, 1854-57, 1859-60, 1863-65, 1867-68

=== Summer Eights ===
Headship

- Men:1824, 1838, 1857-58, 1882-84

=== Henley Royal Regatta ===
Event	Year
Grand Challenge Cup	1882
Ladies Challenge Plate	1857
Silver Goblets	1851

=== Boat Race representatives ===
The following rowers were part of the rowing club at the time of their participation in The Boat Race.

Men's boat race

Year	Name
1836	Ferdinand Thomas Stephens
1829	Woodforde Ffooks (cox)
1841	Richard Bethell
1841	Charles B. Woolaston
1845	F. J. Richards (cox)
1849	James Wodehouse
1849	J. Aitken
1854	W. Pinckney
1854	G. L. Mellish
1854	T. H. Marshall (cox)
1856	W. F. Stocken
1856	R. Ingham Salmon
1857	R. Wells Risley
1858	R. W. Risley
1859	R. W. Risley

Year	Name
1860	R. W. Risley
1861	E. B. Merriman
1861	W. M. Hoare
1862	W. M. Hoare
1863	W. M. Hoare
1866	F. Willan
1867	F. Willan
1868	R. S. Ross of Bladensburg
1868	F. Willan
1869	F. Willan
1876	W. H. Hobart
1879	W. H. Hobart
1880	R. S. Kindersley
1881	R. A. Pickney
1881	R. S. Kindersley

Year	Name
1882	R. S. Kindersley
1884	L. Stock
1884	W. C. Blandy
1884	W. D. B. Curry
1886	W. E. Maynard (cox)
1887	L. J. Clarke (cox)
1914	J. B. Kindersley
1928	G. M. Brander
1983	S. E. Higgins (cox)
2010	Ben Myers
2011	Ben Myers
2022	Tobias Schröder
2024	Jelmer Bennema

Women's boat race

Year	Name
2015	Lauren Kedar
2016	Lauren Kedar
2021	Costi Levy (cox)
2023	Ella Stadler
2024	Ella Stadler
