= Oxford University Boat Club =

British rowing club

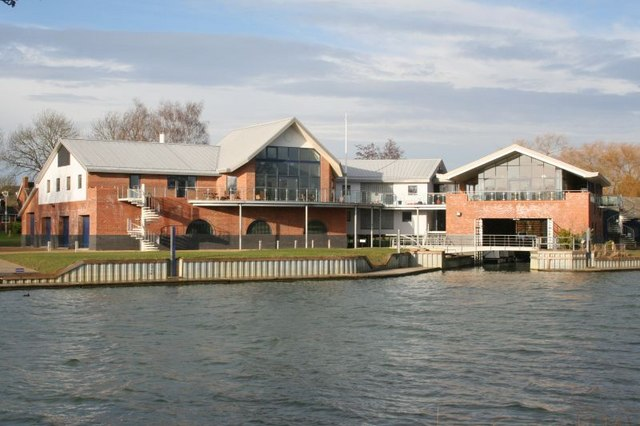

- Location: Wallingford, Oxford
- Home water: River Thames
- Founded: 1829
- University: University of Oxford
- Affiliations: British Rowing
- Website: oubc.org.uk

Events
- University Boat Race

Oxford University Boat Club (OUBC) is the rowing club for the University of Oxford, England, located on the River Thames at Oxford. The club was founded in 1829.

The prime constitutional aim of OUBC is to beat Cambridge University Boat Club in the annual University Boat Race and Lightweight Boat Races on the River Thames. OUBC's Openweight Men's squad currently trail Cambridge in the series by 86 races to 81, with 1 dead heat in The Boat Race 1877, while the Openweight Women's squad trail Cambridge by 45 races to 30. The Lightweight Men's squad trail Cambridge by 29 races to 19, and the Lightweight Women's squad trail Cambridge by 22 races to 17.

The reserve crews are called Isis (Openweight Men), Osiris (Openweight Women), Nephthys (Lightweight Men) and Tethys (Lightweight Women).

OUBC was one of five clubs which retained the right until 2012 to appoint representatives to the Council of British Rowing. The others were Leander Club, London Rowing Club, Thames Rowing Club and Cambridge University Boat Club.

== Facilities ==
OUBC's boat house on the Isis (as the Thames is known at Oxford) burnt down in 1999 and much archival material, including photographs, was lost. OUBC now rows from its new purpose-built boat house in Wallingford, south of Oxford, following a successful fundraising appeal from 2004 to 2007. The boathouse was designed following a limited competition by Tuke Manton Architects LLP. The club has the use of the Redgrave Pinsent Rowing Lake in south Oxfordshire for training purposes, along with the GB Rowing squad and University College Oxford Boat Club.

== Honours ==
=== British champions ===
| Year | Winning crew/s |
|---|---|
| 1983 | Men 8+ |
| 1995 | Men 2+ (Isis) |
| 1996 | Men 2+ |
| 1997 | Men 4x |
| 1998 | Men 4x (Isis) |
| 2001 | Men 4-, Men 8+ (with Isis) |
| 2011 | Open lightweight 2x (Isis) |
| 2016 | Open 4- (Isis) |

Key = 2, 4, 8 (crew size), x (sculls), - (coxless), + (coxed)

=== Henley Royal Regatta ===
| Year | Races won |
|---|---|
| 1843 | Grand Challenge Cup |
| 1844 | Stewards' Challenge Cup |
| 1845 | Stewards' Challenge Cup |
| 1846 | Stewards' Challenge Cup |
| 1847 | Grand Challenge Cup |
| 1848 | Grand Challenge Cup |
| 1850 | Grand Challenge Cup, Stewards' Challenge Cup, Silver Goblets |
| 1851 | Grand Challenge Cup |
| 1852 | Grand Challenge Cup, Stewards' Challenge Cup |
| 1853 | Grand Challenge Cup, Stewards' Challenge Cup |
| 1888 | Silver Goblets |
| 1890 | Silver Goblets |
| 1892 | Silver Goblets |
| 1893 | Silver Goblets |
| 1965 | Thames Challenge Cup (Isis) |
| 1968 | Ladies' Challenge Plate (Cherwell) |
| 1973 | Britannia Challenge Cup (Isis) |
| 1981 | Grand Challenge Cup |
| 1989 | Stewards' Challenge Cup, Visitors' Challenge Cup (Isis) |
| 1995 | Visitors' Challenge Cup (Isis) |
| 1997 | Stewards' Challenge Cup |
| 1998 | Visitors' Challenge Cup (Isis) |
| 2004 | Visitors' Challenge Cup |
| 2005 | Stewards' Challenge Cup |
| 2006 | Silver Goblets & Nickalls' Challenge Cup |
| 2009 | Visitors' Challenge Cup (Isis) |

== See also ==
- List of Oxford University Boat Race crews
- Rowing on the River Thames
- University rowing (UK)
