= List of Oxbridge sister colleges =

Most of the colleges forming the University of Cambridge and University of Oxford are paired into sister colleges across the two universities. The extent of the arrangement differs from case to case, but commonly includes the right to dine at one's sister college, the right to book accommodation there, the holding of joint events between JCRs and invitations to May balls.

Most of the pairings reflect similarities between the two colleges concerned, often parallel histories. For example, University College, Oxford (an ancient and prestigious college, founded 1249) is paired with Trinity Hall, Cambridge (of equivalent reputation, founded 1350). William Wykeham's statutes for New College, Oxford, founded in 1379, formed the basis of the foundation of its sister college, King's College, Cambridge. The two Colleges both share distinguished choral reputations. Founded by scholars from Merton College, one of Oxford's oldest colleges (founded 1264), Peterhouse (Cambridge, 1284) is Cambridge's first college. Similarly, Somerville College, Oxford (founded in 1879 as a women's institution) has Girton College, Cambridge (also historically a women's college, founded 1869) as its sister college. St Catherine's College, Oxford (the most recent undergraduate college in Oxford, founded 1963) is paired with Robinson College, Cambridge (the newest Cambridge college, founded 1977).

Oriel College and St Hugh's College, Oxford currently each dispute the other's claim to sister-college status with Clare College, Cambridge. While Oriel and Clare share a common founding year of 1326 and a long history of association, in the 1980s the newly coeducational Clare associated with the then female-only St. Hugh's to protest against Oriel's remaining all male. Today both St. Hugh's and Oriel are coeducational.

Cambridge	Oxford	Relationship
King's College	New College	King's College and Eton College (1441) founded on the model of New College and Winchester College (1379)
Queens' College	Pembroke College	
Pembroke College	The Queen's College	
Trinity Hall	All Souls College; University College	University (founded 1249) and Trinity Hall (founded 1350) are both ancient colleges
Trinity College	Christ Church	Both founded in 1546 by King Henry VIII from existing institutions
Churchill College	Trinity College	
Christ's College	Wadham College	
St John's College	Balliol College	
Sidney Sussex College	St John's College	
Jesus College	Jesus College	
Corpus Christi College	Corpus Christi College	
Peterhouse	Merton College	Peterhouse (1284) founded by scholars from Merton (1264)
(none)	Hertford College	
Emmanuel College	Exeter College	
Clare College	Oriel College; St Hugh's College	Disputed: Oriel and Clare were both founded in 1326, however in 1980s Clare associated with the then female-only St. Hugh's
Gonville and Caius College	Brasenose College	Jocosa Frankland was a significant benefactor of both colleges
Downing College	Lincoln College	
Magdalene College	Magdalen College	Both named after Saint Mary Magdalene
St Catharine's College	Worcester College	
Girton College	Somerville College	Both founded as women's colleges
Selwyn College	Keble College	Both late Victorian foundations named after Anglican clergymen
Newnham College	Lady Margaret Hall	
Murray Edwards	St Anne's College	
Hughes Hall	Linacre College	
St Edmund's College	Green Templeton College	
Fitzwilliam College	St Edmund Hall	
(none)	St Peter's College	
(none)	Reuben College	
(none)	Nuffield College	
Robinson College	St Catherine's College	St Catherine's (founded 1963) and Robinson College (founded 1977) are both modern establishments.
Darwin College	Wolfson College	Both founded as graduate colleges.
Clare Hall	St Cross College	
Lucy Cavendish College	Regent's Park College	
Homerton College	Harris Manchester College; Mansfield College	
Wolfson College	St Antony's College	
(none)	Kellogg College	

== See also ==
- Colleges of the University of Oxford
- Colleges of the University of Cambridge
- Seven Sisters (colleges)
- College rivalry
- Oxbridge
