= Oxford University Rowing Clubs =

UK rowing association

Oxford University Rowing Clubs (OURCs) is a federation of the Oxford University Boat Club (OUBC) and all Oxford college boat clubs. OURCs is a purely administrative organisation with no training or crews. It was created in 1986 in order to remove the organisational burden from the university squad and is responsible for organising inter-collegiate competitions and overseeing the conduct of college rowing. The student-led organisation of OURCs is supported by senior members of the university, the Council for Oxford University Rowing, which issues advice and deals with aspects of rowing safety. A similar function is fulfilled by the Cambridge University Combined Boat Clubs for rowing clubs of the University of Cambridge.

== Clubs ==
A number of boat clubs represent more than one college or permanent private hall.

Name	Established	BR Club Code	Blade	Additional college(s) represented
Oxford University Boat Club	1829	OUB		
Oxford University Women's Boat Club	1927	OUW		
Oxford University Lightweight Rowing Club	1975	OUL		
Oxford University Women's Lightweight Rowing Club	1984	OLW		
Balliol College Boat Club	1825	BAL		
Brasenose College Boat Club	1815	BRC		
Christ Church Boat Club	1817	CHB		Kellogg
Corpus Christi College Boat Club	1858	COO		
Exeter College Boat Club	1823	EXC		
Green Templeton Boat Club	2008	GTM		
Hertford College Boat Club	1875	HEC		
Jesus College Boat Club	1815	JEO		
Keble College Boat Club	1870	KEB		
Lady Margaret Hall Boat Club	1972	LMH		
Linacre Boat Club	1969	LIN		Nuffield
Lincoln College Boat Club	1880	LIC		
Magdalen College Boat Club	1859	MAG		All Souls
Mansfield College Boat Club	1965	MAN		
Merton College Boat Club	1838	MER		
New College Boat Club	1840	NEC		
Oriel College Boat Club	1830	ORO		
Osler House Boat Club	1839	OSG		(Clinical medical students)
Pembroke College Boat Club	1842	PMB		
The Queen's College Boat Club	1827	QCO		Wycliffe Hall
Regent's Park College Boat Club	1927	RPC		Blackfriars Hall
Reuben Boat Club	2023	SBH		St Benet's Hall, Blackfriars Hall and St Stephen's House
Somerville College Boat Club	1921	SOM		
St Anne's College Boat Club		SAC		
St Antony's College Boat Club	1994	SAY		
St Catherine's College Boat Club	1875	SCO		
St Edmund Hall Boat Club	1851	SEH		
St Hilda's College Boat Club	1904	SHI		
St Hugh's Boat Club	1891	SHG		
St John's College Boat Club	1863	SJO		
St Peter's College Boat Club	1929	SPC		
Trinity College Boat Club	1820	TRO		
University College Boat Club	1827	UCO		
Wadham College Boat Club	1835	WAD		Harris Manchester
Wolfson College Boat Club	1969	WOO		St Cross
Worcester College Boat Club	1825	WRO		

== OURCs run events ==
- Autumn Fours (Michaelmas Term)
- Isis Winter League (Michaelmas and Hilary Term)
- Torpids (Hilary Term)
- Summer Eights (Trinity Term)
