= Wolfson College Boat Club (Oxford) =

British rowing club

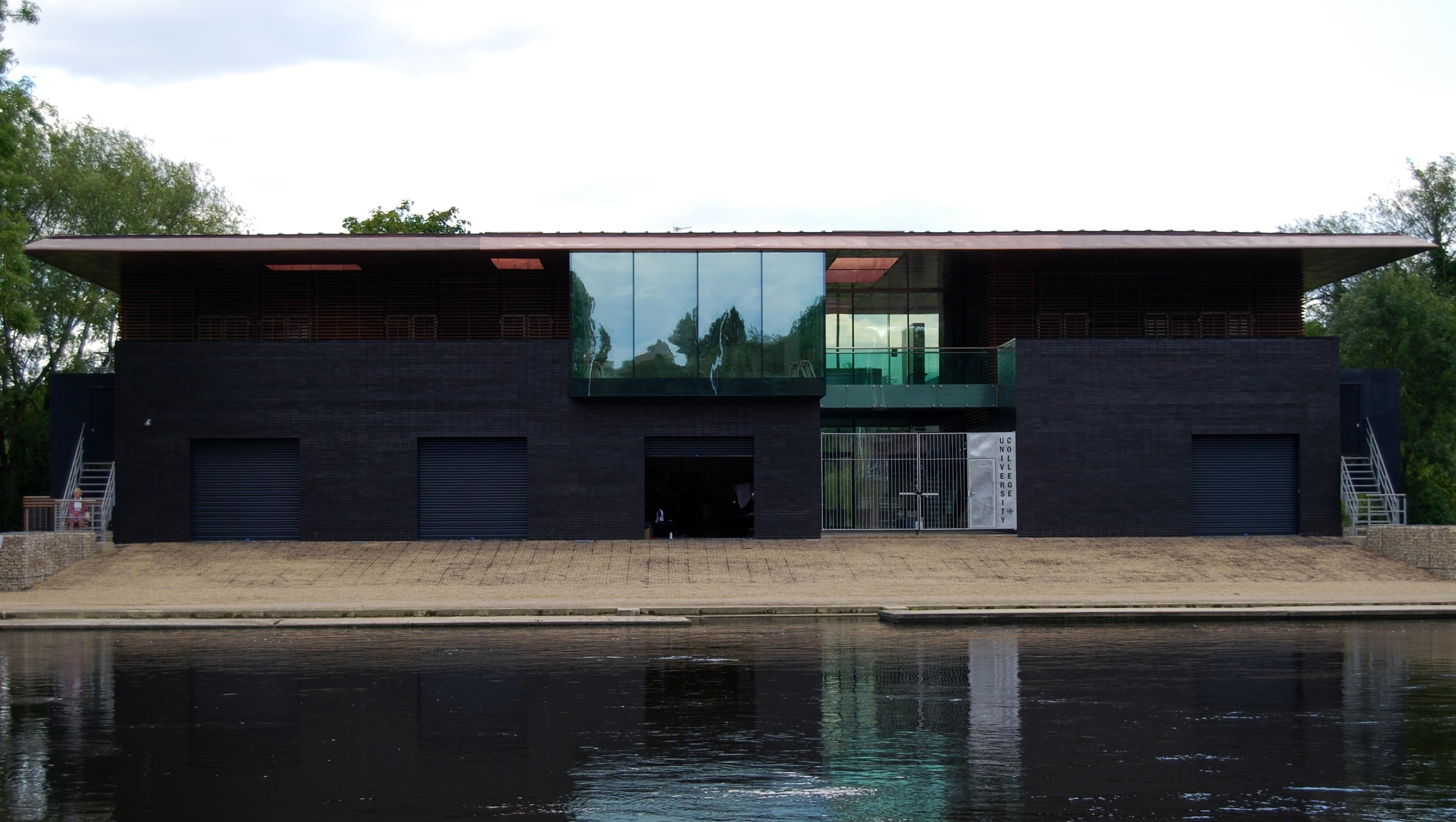

- The club's blade colours
- Location: University College Boathouse, Oxford
- Coordinates: 51°44′31.6″N 1°14′59.0″W
- Home water: River Thames (known in Oxford as The Isis)
- Founded: 1969
- Key people: Christina Redfield (Senior Member)
- Head of the River: Men's Eights: 2025; Women's Eights: 2019
- University: University of Oxford
- Colours
- Affiliations: British Rowing (boat code WOO); Darwin College BC (Sister college)
- Website: www.wolfsonrowing.org

Wolfson College Boat Club is rowing club for the members of both Wolfson College, Oxford and St Cross College, Oxford. The club has competed since 1969 and takes part in the collegiate competitions Torpids and Summer Eights. Due to the membership being drawn from graduate colleges, the club races actively during the vacation periods at external races. Both squads also participate in the annual head races in London on the tideway (HoRR, WEHoRR, and HOR4s).

== The Club ==
Wolfson Boat Club shares the University College Boathouse with Somerville, St Peter's, and Univ. This is a new building, constructed in 2007. It is situated on the far side of the river from the town, next to Queen's College Recreation Ground, and primarily accessible along the river's bridle path. Prior to the use of this building, a different building was used, one situated in the same place. The previous building burnt down in 1999.

== History ==
The club was founded in 1966. The boat club also represents St Cross College, Oxford and several rowers from St Cross have participated in The Boat Race, the first in 1974.

In 2004, Peter Reed became Wolfson's first representative to compete in the men's Boat Race and in 2010, two rowers from the boat club competed in The Boat Race 2010.

As of 2025, two boats for the men's squad and three for the women's squad are pre-qualified in both events due to previous successes. In 2019, Wolfson Boat Club celebrated both its 50th anniversary and achieving, for the first time, Women's Headship, which is the highest ranking possible in Bumps racing.

In 2025, the men's 1st VIII followed suit and achieved the lofty 'double' headship, clinching top spot at both Torpids and Eights Week in the same year. This was also the first time the men's side had achieved either headship.

== Honours ==
=== Boat Race representatives ===
The following rowers were part of the rowing club at the time of their participation in The Boat Race.

Men's boat race (Wolfson)

Year	Name
2004	Peter Reed
2010	Charlie Burkitt
2010	Adam Barhamand +
2023	Felix Drinkall
2025	Nicholas Kohl

Men's boat race (St Cross)

Year	Name
1974	D. Rendel
1997	T. Foster
2009	Sjoerd Hamburger
2015	Jamie Cook
2016	Jamie Cook
2017	Jamie Cook

Women's boat race (Wolfson)

Year	Name
2016	Emma Spruce
2016	Ëlo Luik
2018	Katherine Erickson
2025	Sarah Polsom
2025	Kyra Delray
2026	Kyra Delray

Women's boat race (St Cross)

Year	Name
2015	Shelley Pearson
2018	Abigail Killen
2021	Julia Lindsay
2022	Julia Lindsay
2024	Julia Lindsay

Key

- + = coxswain
