= Wolfson College Boat Club =

Wolfson College Boat Club may refer to:

- Wolfson College Boat Club (Cambridge)
- Wolfson College Boat Club (Oxford)
