= St Peter's College Boat Club =

British rowing club

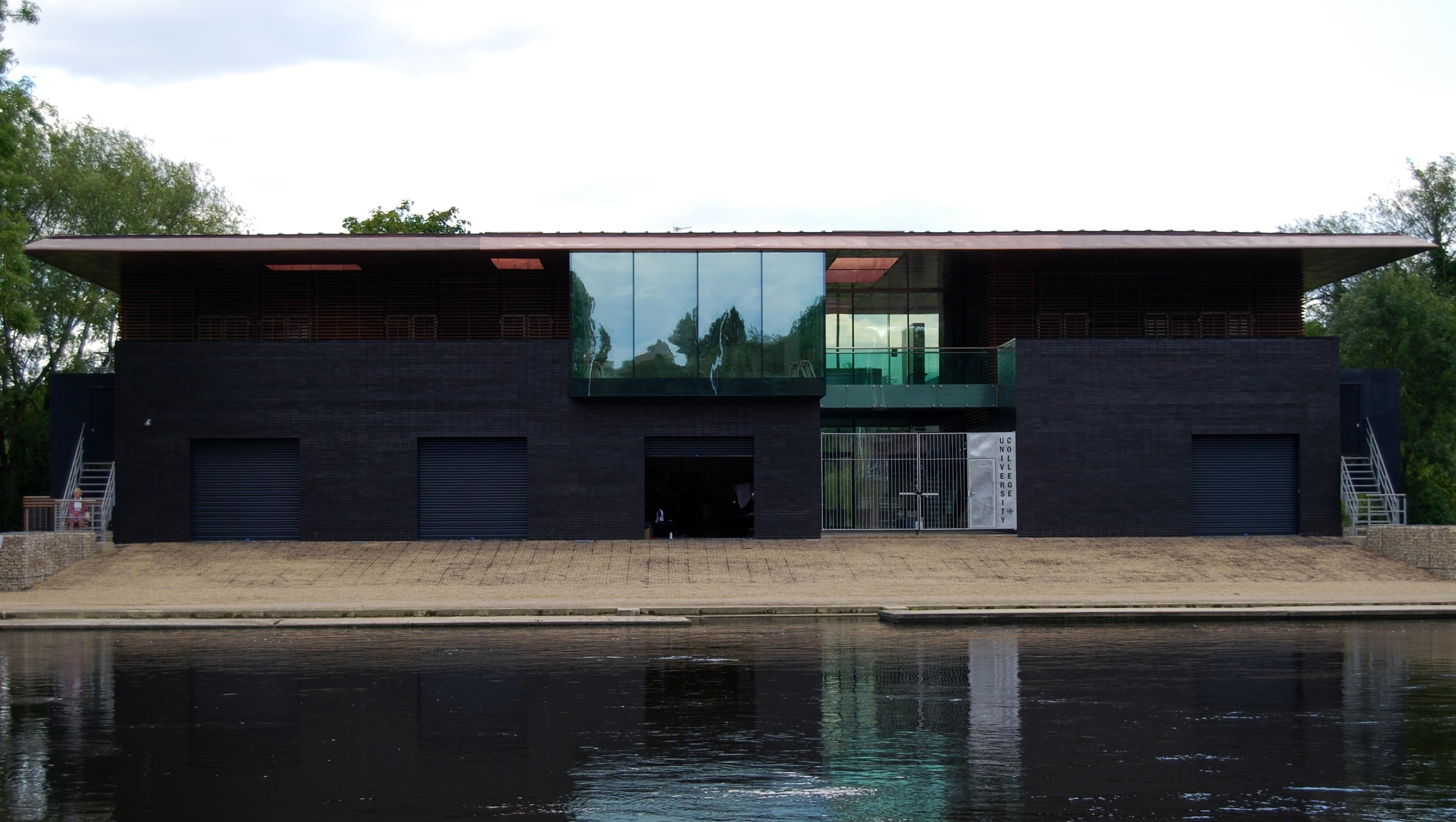

- Location: University College Boathouse
- Coordinates: 51°44′32″N 1°14′59″W
- Home water: River Thames (known in Oxford as the Isis)
- Founded: 1929
- Former names: St Peter's Hall Boat Club (1929-1961)
- Key people: Ella Miles (President); Rohan Chauhan (Men's Captain); Mia Morris (Women's Captain); Cara Kelsall (Secretary); Alex Long (Treasurer); Tim Mawson (Senior Member)
- University: University of Oxford
- Colours
- Affiliations: British Rowing (boat code SPC)
- Website: stpeterscollegeboatclub.com

St Peter's College Boat Club (SPCBC) is the rowing club for members of St Peter's College, Oxford. Founded in 1929, it is now based in the University College Boathouse on the southern bank of The Isis (River Thames). The Boat Club competes in Torpids and Summer Eights bumps races in Oxford. Notable St Peter's oarsmen include Mark Stanhope, former Bishop of Oxford John Pritchard, former World Champion Mike Blomquist and Karl Hudspith (4 time 'Blue' and 2012 OUBC President) and Roman Röösli (2x Gold Champion, 2023 World Champion).

== History ==
=== Early days ===
St Peter's College Boat Club was established in the year of St Peter's Hall's foundation, in 1929. With only 40 undergraduates in the entire year group of 1929-30 and most of them without previous rowing experience, they still improved their position on the river, both in Torpids and in Eights. The St Peter's Master, Christopher Chavasse, was a dominant influence. He encouraged all activities which could help the Hall's reputation, in particular sport. Chavasse and the College Bursar, Toby Tinne, an Old Etonian and one-time rowing Blue, were the team's coaches.

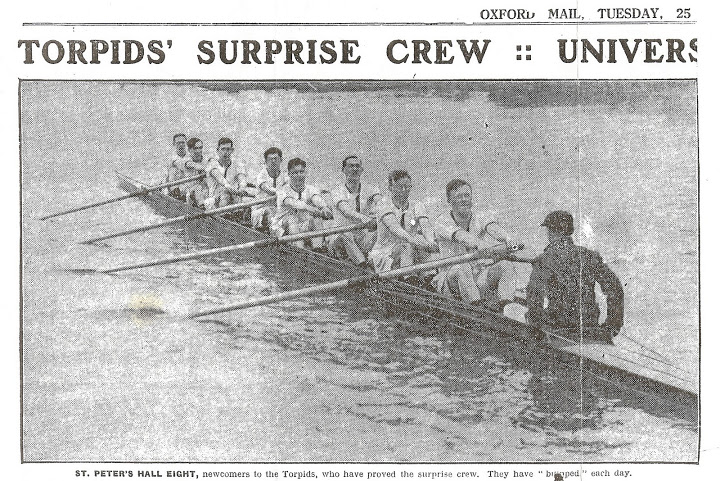
The Times, February 27 1930, p. 7 - St. Peters' Hall made a brilliant debut, for they only came into existence two years ago. They made a bump every afternoon, and from the ease with which they made them would have gone a long way into the Third Division before reaching the end of their tether. Their performance is the more noteworthy as they have only 40 members on the books. Next year their prospects will be hardly as good, as most of those rowing this year in the Torpids will be requisitioned for their Summer Eights.

The club acquired its very first boat in the second year of its existence and named it St Peter of Galilee, in spirit of the evangelical mainspring of the Hall's foundation. As St Peter's Hall could not afford its own College Barge to store equipment and kit, it used one of the Salter's Barge instead.

The Thirties were a good period for rowing at St Peter's. The immediate predecessors had gone through the other colleges' second and third boats in the lowest division at the rate of a bump a day. 1936 saw the second boat, on the first day, scoring an exceedingly rare double over-bump: five places gained in one afternoon. And in the Reading 'Head' the First Eight finished sixth - equal with Bristol University who were twenty-first on the Tideway a fortnight later. Hilary 1937, saw the college boat getting smashed, when it went over Iffley Weir. Having to row in a hired, very much older and heavier tub from Salters Streamers they went down each day of Torpids. The recovery set in during 1938 (1st VIII winning blades).

During the Second World War, smaller colleges were grouped together to enable them to compete in inter-collegiate events. In 1940, Pembroke, Corpus and St Peter's boated together. There are no records of St Peter's rowers participating in 1941-1945. However, the women of Westfield College – who were housed in the rooms of St Peter's Hall – were using the facilities of St Peter's Hall and entered competitions on the Isis.

=== Post-War ===
Two St Peter's boats competed in the first post-war Torpids and Summer Eights in 1946. The Bursar C. E. Tinne was still coaching, "bicycling, megaphone in hand, and bawling instructions anywhere between Sandford and the end of Port Meadow", and the Boat Club moved with their fleet into the old OUBC boathouse.

In the 1950s, the oarsmen of St Peter's Hall enjoyed significant success and their Hall had a strong reputation for sporting achievement. The club entered up to six boats in each regatta. For the first time a St Peter's Torpid entered the First Division in 1950. In 1955, the First Torpid went up 6 places, ending up as number 6 in the First Division (where they stayed for two years). In Eights Week the College's five boats achieved a total of eighteen bumps without being bumped with the First Boat ending up as number 1 in the Second Division. Both finish results are now regarded as the highest achievements of a St Peter's First Torpid or First Eight.

In the 1960s, the club used the facilities at the OUBC boathouse as well as Abingdon Boys School.

Bump Suppers, still not a regular tradition at college, were only held celebrating a blade winning crew as it happened in 1972 for the Schools (Second) Eight. This Bump Supper saw the burning of two old Eights in front of Hennington Hall, the erection of a brick stone wall in front of the chapel's entrance, an attempt to colour the Christ Church pond purple and an encounter with the local police.

1979 saw the first admission of women to the College. In the same year, one Torpid and two Eights were entered for the St Peter's Ladies Boat Club.

Emily Guilder Cena recalls:

As a short history, in the fall of 1979 Lauren Chapin, P.J. Long, and I thought it would be a wonderful idea to learn to row, and we managed to find enough other girls at SPC who were also interested to put together a single eight for Torpids. That first crew was: Clare Gilham (stroke), Lauren Chapin, Belinda Jemal, Judith Wilson, Emily Geilker, Eileen Scallen, P.J. Long, and Gillian Chedzoy (bow).

Since it was obvious we were having so much fun rowing, more women wanted to participate and we fielded two ladies eights for Eights Week. Those crews were: 1st Ladies Eight: Julia Ferguson (cox), Emily Geilker (stroke), Judith Wilson, Clare Gilham, Eileen Scallen, P.J. Long, Gillian Chedzoy, Laura Byatt, and Lauren Chapin (bow); 2nd Ladies Eight: Geordie Royle(cox), Caryn Minnit (stroke), S. Tinker, Belinda Jemal, K. Moore, K. Clarke, J. Frank, J. Brown, and A. Gelling (bow).

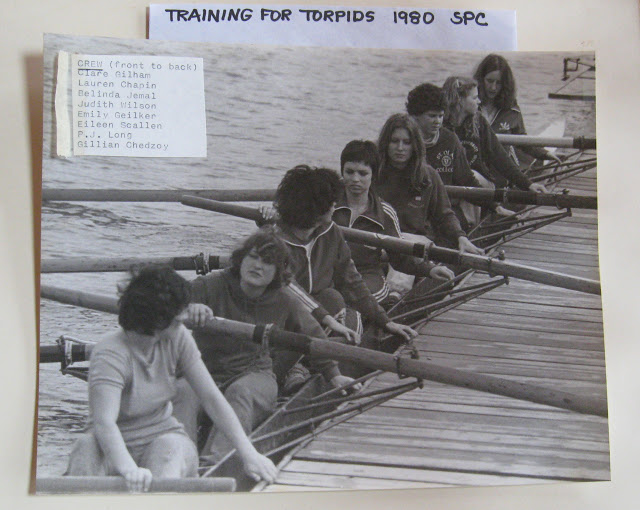
1979 saw the first admission of women to the College. Depicted here is a Women's crew training for Torpids in 1980.

=== Recent years ===
In 1999, the Victorian listed University Boathouse burned down and with it SPCBC's entire fleet, memorabilia like trophy blades as well as archive material of the club. Later identified as arson, the loss of the boathouse put the club into a devastating situation and it took the club over five years to rebuild its fleet but only by severe cut backs in the quality of its boats. 2007 saw the opening of new University Boathouse, which replaced the older boathouse on the same site.

In 2008, St. Peter's Men's Novice A boat beat six other men's A crews and one B crew to win Christ Church Regatta for the first time in the club's history. In Torpids 2009, SPCBC finished not only with two sets of blades (5 and 6 bump blades for M1 and M2) but +15 net bumps, and five competing crews which is the most the club has put out since 1998. 2009 saw the Men's 1st VIII also winning the novice plate event at Bedford Amateur Regatta.

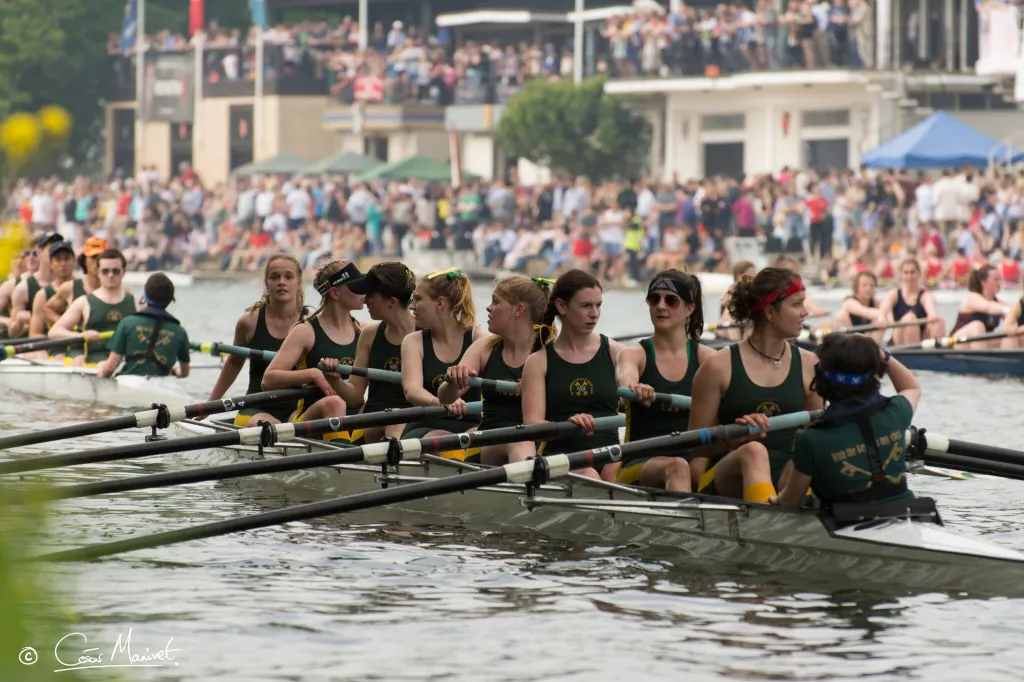
A St Peter's Boat Club Women's crew competing in Summer VIII's on the Isis.

In 2010, SPCBC was the most successful club in Torpids. With 9 bumps for two women's boats and with 14 bumps altogether St Peter's climbed up the bump charts. 2011 saw the Men's First Eight winning the Novice Division at Bristol Head and coming 245th in the Head of the River Race ahead of several other Oxford Colleges. In 2012, the men's side won the Worcester Sprint Regatta in a coxed four. In 2013, SPCBC won Oriel Regatta as well as the Senior Women's event in the New College Indoor Regatta.

St Peter's experienced somewhat of a downturn in 2015, with St Peter's Men's 1st Eight being awarded two sets of spoons and sitting at the lowest position on The River since 1931. SPCBC's Men's 1st Torpid suffered a similar fate. Similarly in 2017 the crew found itself in the lowest position on The River since 1930.

Yet things improved, St. Peter's Women's 1st Eight won blades in Summer Eights 2019, 27 years after the last time this happened. SPCBC's Women's 1st position in Torpids 2019 is the highest since 2008.

2022 was a remarkable year for SPCBC. In Summer VIII's all top 4 boats finished +4 and won blades. This made 2022 the most successful year in recent history.

In 2023, St Peter's women's 1st boat won blades in Torpids, whilst the women's 2nd boat won blades in Summer Eights 2023. The same year SPCBC also created its first YouTube "hype video" to the popular Queen song "Don't stop me now" (https://youtube.com/watch?v=_Rfth75KmwY&feature=share). The video was modelled off a previously popular video made by Trinity college boat club video a year prior and proved to be very well received.

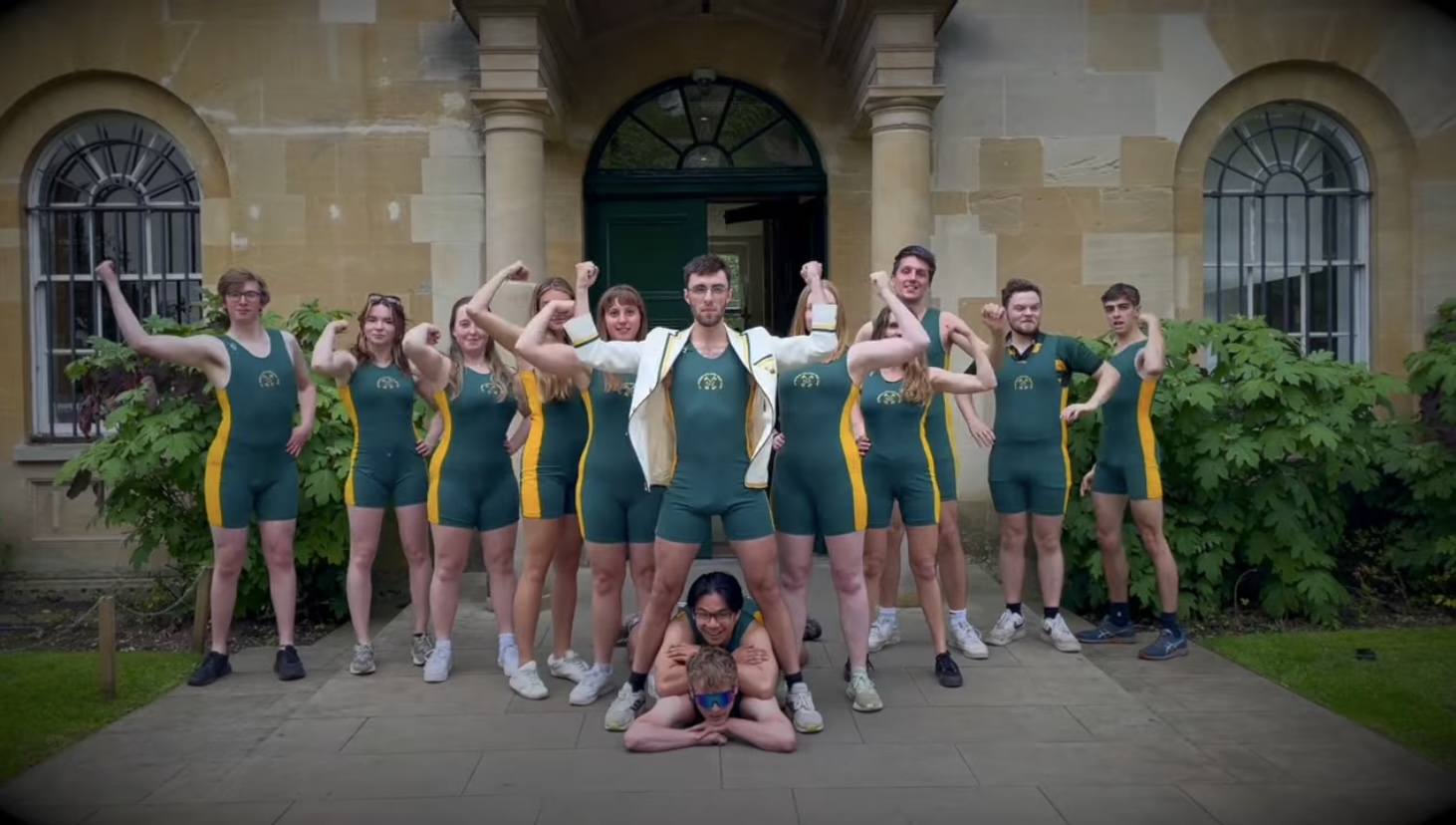
St Peters created its first YouTube "hype video" in 2023, to the song "Don't Stop Me Now" by Queen.

In January 2024, SPCBC also set the World Record for the Longest Continuous Row (Large Team Heavyweight Mixed 20-29) on a rowing machine, with 83 participants logging 1,628 miles (2,620,930 metres) over 10 days. The students set an ambitious goal of surpassing Hull University Boat Club’s 2019 7-day record, officially breaking the Hull record on Sunday 28 January at 2pm, and finalising their 10-day record at 2pm on 31 January 2024.

== Facilities and training ==
SPCBC shares the boathouse with University College, Somerville College and Wolfson College. The building is owned by University College and won a Royal Institute of British Architects prize. Members have access to the rowing shed in college, which houses eight ergos and weights.

== Governance and funding ==
The club is run by a students committee, consisting of the President, Men's and Women's Captains of Boats, Captain of Coxes, Treasurer, Secretary and Water Safety Officer. Members of the committee hold office for one year, starting on the Sunday of Sixth Week of Trinity Term – the day after the last day of Eights Week.

== Alumni ==
Notable St Peter's oarsmen include Mark Stanhope, former Bishop of Oxford John Pritchard, former World Champion Mike Blomquist and Karl Hudspith (4 time 'Blue' and 2012 OUBC President).

== Honours ==
=== Boat Race representatives ===
The following rowers were part of the rowing club at the time of their participation in The Boat Race.

Men's boat race

| Year | Name |
|---|---|
| 1964 | D. W. A. Cox |
| 1971 | D. R. D. Willis |
| 1972 | D. R. d'A Willi |
| 1976 | A. D. Edwards |
| 1992 | Ian W. Gardiner |
| 1993 | Ian W. Gardiner |
| 1995 | Jorn-Inge Thronsden |
| 2005 | Mike Blomquist |

| Year | Name |
|---|---|
| 2011 | Karl Hudspith |
| 2012 | Karl Hudspith |
| 2013 | Karl Hudspith |
| 2014 | Karl Hudspith |
| 2021 | Alex Bebb |
| 2022 | Roman Röösli |
| 2023 | Alex Bebb |

Women's boat race

| Year | Name |
|---|---|
| 2021 | Megan Stoker |
| 2023 | Sara Helin |
| 2023 | Tara Slade (cox) |
| 2024 | Joe Gellett (cox) |

== Recent results ==
Extended content

2016 Torpids

| Boat | Start | Wed | Thurs | Fri | Sat | Finish |
|---|---|---|---|---|---|---|
| Men's 1st Torpid | 7th in Div 3 | Bumped Oriel II, overbumped Christ Church II | Bumped Corpus Christi | Rowed over | Rowed over | +3: 4th in Div 3 |
| Men's 2nd Torpid | Failed to qualify | | | | | |
| Women's 1st Torpid | 10th in Div 3 | Bumped St John's II | Rowed over | Bumped by St Hilda's | Bumped Merton | +1: 9th in Div 3 |
| Women's 2nd Torpid | Failed to qualify | | | | | |

2016 Eights

| Boat | Start | Wed | Thurs | Fri | Sat | Finish |
|---|---|---|---|---|---|---|
| Men's 1st VIII | 1st in Div 3 | Bumped by St Hugh's | Rowed over | Bumped by Exeter | Bumped by Merton | -3: 4th in Div 3 |
| Men's 2nd VIII | 4th in Div 5 | Rowed over | Bumped by Regent's Park | Rowed over | Bumped by Wolfson III | -2: 6th in Div 5 |
| Women's 1st VIII | 7th in Div 3 | Rowed over | Rowed over | Bumped by St Anthony's | Bumped by Green Templeton | -2: 9th in Div 3 |
| Women's 2nd VIII | 12th in Div 5 | Rowed over | Bumped by Pembroke III | Rowed over | Bumped Keble II | 0: 12th in Div 5 |

2017 Torpids

| Boat | Start | Wed | Thurs | Fri | Sat | Finish |
|---|---|---|---|---|---|---|
| Men's 1st Torpid | 3rd in Div 3 | rowed over | b. by Corpus & Linacre | b. by St Hugh's & St Anthony's | bumped by Wadham II & Wolfson II | -6: 9th in Div 3 |
| Men's 2nd Torpid | 10th in Div 6 | b. by St Hugh's III | bumped by St Hilda's II | bumped by St Anthony's III | bumped Worcester II | -3: 12th in Div 6 |
| Women's 1st Torpid | 9th in Div 3 | bumped by Merton | rowed over | b. by St Anthony's, b. Corpus | bumped by Oriel II | -1: 11th in Div 3 |
| Women's 2nd Torpid | failed to qualify | | | | | |

2017 Eights

| Boat | Start | Wed | Thurs | Fri | Sat | Finish |
|---|---|---|---|---|---|---|
| Men's 1st VIII | 4th in Div 3 | bumped by Corpus Christi | bumped by Christ Church II | bumped by St Anthony's | bumped by Somerville | -4: 8th in Div 3, Spoons |
| Men's 2nd VIII | 6th in Div 5 | bumped Wolfson III | bumped Exeter II | bumped St John's II | bumped Worcester II | +4: 2nd in Div 5, Blades |
| Men's 3rd VIII | failed to qualify | | | | | |
| Women's 1st VIII | 8th in Div 3 | rowed over | bumped Wadham II | rowed over | rowed over | +1: 7th in Div 3 |
| Women's 2nd VIII | 9th in Div 5 | rowed over | bumped Pembroke III | rowed over | rowed over | +1: 8th in Div 5 |

2018 Torpids

| Boat | Start | Wed | Thurs | Fri | Sat | Finish |
|---|---|---|---|---|---|---|
| Men's 1st Torpid | 10th in Div 3 | bumped by Jesus II, bumped by Green Templeton | cancelled | cancelled | cancelled | -2: 12th in Div 3 |
| Men's 2nd Torpid | 7th in Div 6 | bumped by Worcester II & University III, bumped St Hugh's II | cancelled | cancelled | cancelled | -1: 8th in Div 6 |
| Women's 1st Torpid | 11th in Div 3 | bumped Oriel II which bumped St Antony's | cancelled | cancelled | cancelled | +2: 9th in Div 3 |

2019 Torpids

| Boat | Start | Wed | Thurs | Fri | Sat | Finish |
|---|---|---|---|---|---|---|
| Men's 1st Torpid | 12th in Div 3 | rowed over | bumped by Christ Church II | bumped by Oriel II | b. St Antony's & Christ Church II | 0: 12th in Div 3 |
| Men's 2nd Torpid | failed to qualify | | | | | |
| Women's 1st Torpid | 9th in Div 3 | bumped Wadham II | b. Queens, overbumped Merton | rowed over | bumped Exeter | +4: 5th in Div 3 |
| Women's 2nd Torpid | 8th in Div 5 | b. by New BB & LMH II | bumped by University III | b. by Exeter II, b. LMH II | bumped by LMH II | -4: 12th in Div 5 |

2019 Eights

| Boat | Start | Wed | Thurs | Fri | Sat | Finish |
|---|---|---|---|---|---|---|
| Men's 1st Eight | 8th in Div 3 | rowed over | bumped St. Anthony's I | b. by St. Anthony's I | b. St. Anthony's I | +1: 7th in Div 3 |
| Men's 2nd Wight | 13th in Div 4 | bumped by Queen's II | b. by Exeter II | b. by Wolfson III | b. by Lady Margaret II | -6: 6th in Div 5 |
| Women's 1st Torpid | 9th in Div 3 | bumped St. Hilda's I | b. Pembroke II | b. University II | b. St. Anthony's I | +4: 5th in Div 3 |
| Women's 2nd Torpid | 11th in Div 6 | rowed over | rowed over | rowed over | bumped St. Anne's II | +1: 10th in Div 6 |

2022 Torpids

| Boat | Start | Wed | Thurs | Fri | Sat | Finish |
|---|---|---|---|---|---|---|
| Men's 1st Torpid | 4th in Div 3 | Rowed over | Overbumped Somerville | Rowed over | Rowed over | +1: 3rd in Div 3 |
| Men's 2nd Torpid | 6th in Div 6 | Bumped Christ Church | Bumped Univ | Bumped Christ Church | Bumped Wolfson | +4: 11th in Div 5 |
| Women's 1st Torpid | 2nd in Div 3 | Bumped by Corpus Christi | Bumped by Hilda's | Overbumped by St Antony's | Rowed Over | -4: 6th in Div 3 |
| Women's 2nd Torpid | Failed to qualify | | | | | |

2022 Eights

| Boat | Start | Wed | Thurs | Fri | Sat | Finish |
|---|---|---|---|---|---|---|
| Men's 1st VIII | 9th in Div 3 | Bumped Keble | Bumped Pembroke | Bumped Anne's | Bumped John's | +4: 5th in Div 3 |
| Men's 2nd VIII | 10th in Div 5 | Bumped LMH | Bumped Wolfson | Bumped Hertford | Bumped Exeter | +4: 6th in Div 5 |
| Women's 1st VIII | 7th in Div 3 | Bumped Worcester | Bumped St Hugh's | Bumped Corpus Christi | Bumped Brasenose | +4: 3rd in Div 3 |
| Women's 2nd VIII | 1st in Div 7 | Bumped Queen's | Bumped Merton | Bumped Univ | Bumped Exeter | +4: 7th in Div 6 |
