= St Hugh's Boat Club =

British rowing club

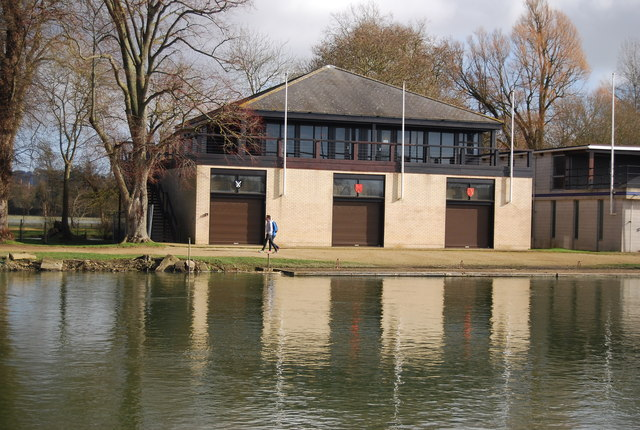

- Shared boathouse with Wadham and St Anne's and the St Hugh's blade.
- Location: Boathouse Island, Christ Church Meadow, Oxford, Oxford
- Coordinates: 51.742756°N 1.248819°W
- Home water: The Isis
- University: University of Oxford
- Affiliations: British Rowing (boat code SHG)
- Website: www.sthughsboatclub.co.uk

St Hugh's Boat Club (SHBC) is a rowing club for members of St Hugh’s College, University of Oxford. It is based on the Isis at Boathouse Island, Christ Church Meadow, Oxford, Oxford and is affiliated to British Rowing.

The boat club shares the boathouse building with St Anne's College Boat Club and Wadham College Boat Club and the club blazer is blue with white and yellow trim on the cuffs and lapels.

== History ==
The club was founded in 1891 with the club's boat was stored at the River Cherwell and only students "who can swim 50 feet" were permitted to use it. Almost twenty years later, the boat club was able to buy and acquire its first boathouse - the Middle Cherwell Boat House. After a period of financial trouble, the Boat club was refounded in 1973.

The newly rejuvenated club boasted 16 members coached by the members of the Brasenose College Boat Club with regular outings scheduled and a growing squad of Blues rowers. Two years later, in 1975, the St Hugh's Women's First VIII bumped Magdalen M4. and became the first and only women's boat to successfully bump a men's crew. This event was the catalyst for the creation of the Women's divisions for Summer Eight's since 1976, where St Hugh's was a strong contender. In 1979, St Hugh's W1 won the Boat Club's first Headship. In 1980 the W1 were defeated by Somerville College Boat Club in the final.

In 1981 Boris Rankov was the club's first representative in the men's Boat Race.

After two years of slipping down the order, the Boat Club was able to win Headship back again in 1982 until 1984. The Boat Club was also able to win Torpids Headship in the Women's division in 1986.

Between 1989 and 1990 the current boathouse was constructed.

In 2018 Beth Bridgman was the club's first representative in the women's Boat Race and she also competed the following year.

== Honours ==
=== Boat Race representatives ===
The following rowers were part of the rowing club at the time of their participation in The Boat Race.

Men's boat race

Year	Name
1981	Boris Rankov
1982	Boris Rankov
1983	Boris Rankov
2013	Oskar Zorrilla +
2014	Laurence Harvey +
2018	Anders Weiss
2024	Joseph Rosenfield

Women's boat race

Year	Name
2018	Beth Bridgman
2019	Beth Bridgman
2021	Katherine Maitland
2024	Eleonora Nanni

Key

- + = coxswain

== See also ==
- University rowing (UK)
- Oxford University Boat Club
- Rowing on the River Thames
