= Tamesis Regatta =

Series of rowing races at the University of Oxford

- Most Recent Winners (2025)
Magdalen Men	St Hugh's Women
- Second Place
University College Men	Magdalen Women
- Third Place
Queen's Men	Merton Women
Course	Isis (upstream)
Course length	variable but c. 400m
- Note: Last Regatta 26^{th} November – 29^{th} November 2025
- LBC – Tamesis Regatta

The Tamesis Regatta is a series of rowing races in the University of Oxford, England, held annually in late November, during the seventh week of Michaelmas term. Novice crews representing each college compete against each other, often for the first time. There are separate men's and women's races, with many colleges entering more than one crew.

First run in 1959, the event used to be known as the Christ Church Regatta, as it was organised by that college boat club, but the regatta is now organised by whichever Oxford College club wins a competitive bidding process run by OURCs. Since 2022, the regatta has been organised and run by Linacre Boat Club.

The name Tamesis comes from the Latin name of the river Thames, itself from the old Brittonic Tamesas (modern Welsh Tafwys), on which the regatta takes place. It likely means 'dark'.

The equivalent race in Cambridge is the Clare Novice Regatta.

== Race ==
The regatta is held on the Isis, the stretch of the River Thames running through Oxford.

The competition is run over up to four days in total, from Wednesday of 7th week in Michaelmas Term to Saturday of 7th Week. Races are side-by-side between two teams that are chosen at random. The winner of the race will progress to the next round of races. The loser may be knocked out so that they no longer race. However, the loser of a first round race will enter the repechage, meaning that they have the chance to stay in the competition. The knock-out rounds of the competition proceed until two crews are left to race against each other in the Final.

A regatta of novice crews has potential problems, with crews catching crabs, clashing or stopping. If racing becomes dangerous the race will be stopped by klaxon. In 2012 deteriorating river conditions led to racing being suspended after a crew got into trouble while marshalling at the end of their race. The regatta was cancelled in 2019, 2023 and 2024 due to high river conditions, and in 2020 due to the COVID-19 pandemic.

== See also ==
- Eights Week
- Torpids
- The Boat Race & Women's Boat Race
