= Keble College Boat Club =

British rowing club

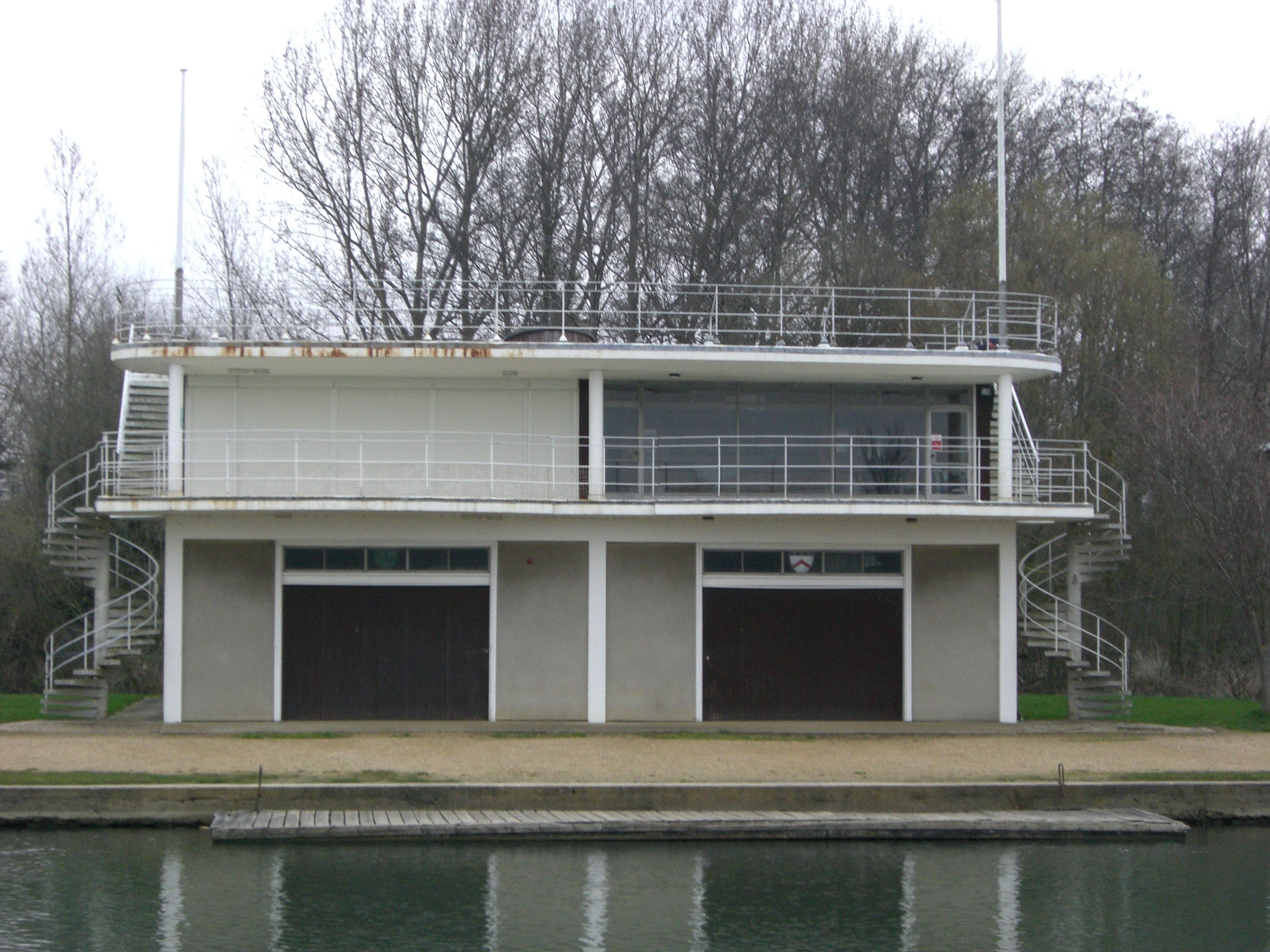

- The club's boathouse (right) and blade colours
- Home water: Isis 51°44′19.3″N 1°14′47.0″W; Godstow 51°45′53.1″N 1°16′52.8″W
- Founded: c. 1870
- Key people: Lewis Anderson (President); Ben Beechener (Men's Captain); Sierra Sparks (Women's Captain); Tim Foster (Coach)
- Head of the River: Men: 1963, 1967, 1968, 1969, 1970, 1972, 1977, 2018
- University: University of Oxford
- Colours
- Affiliations: British Rowing (boat code KEB); Selwyn College Boat Club (Sister college)
- Website: www.keblecollegebc.com

Keble College Boat Club (KCBC) is the rowing club of Keble College, in Oxford, United Kingdom. The boat club is based in its boathouse on the Isis, which is shared with Jesus College. Most of the year is spent training at the boat club's second facility at the Godstow stretch to the North.

== History ==
In Summer Eights the Men's and Women's first VIII crews have consistently raced in the top division. The men have held the Headship on eight occasions, most recently in 2018, and are currently in third position on the river. The women's boat is now eighth position on the river, after reaching a peak of fifth on the river in 2017. The second and third boats regularly achieve blades in lower divisions.

In Torpids, while Keble has not yet achieved the Men's or the Women's headship, both first boats have enjoyed periods of success, especially in recent years. The women's first Torpid is currently fifth on the River, having peaked at fourth on the river in 2019. The highest position the Men have held was second on the river, last held in 1988, before dropping to 33rd on the river, the position they occupied at the end of 2013 racing. Since then, they have risen 26 places to sixth on the river, achieving blades in five of their last eight Torpids campaigns.

The Women's first Torpid represented Oxford at the Henley Boat Races inter-collegiate race in 2017, where they defeated Jesus College, Cambridge. They were also selected to represent Oxford in 2018, but the race was unfortunately cancelled.

Three Keblites occupied boat race crews in the 2017 Cancer Research UK Boat Race crews. Olympic gold medallist Ed Coode rowed for the college 1st VIII during his time at Keble in the late 1990s.

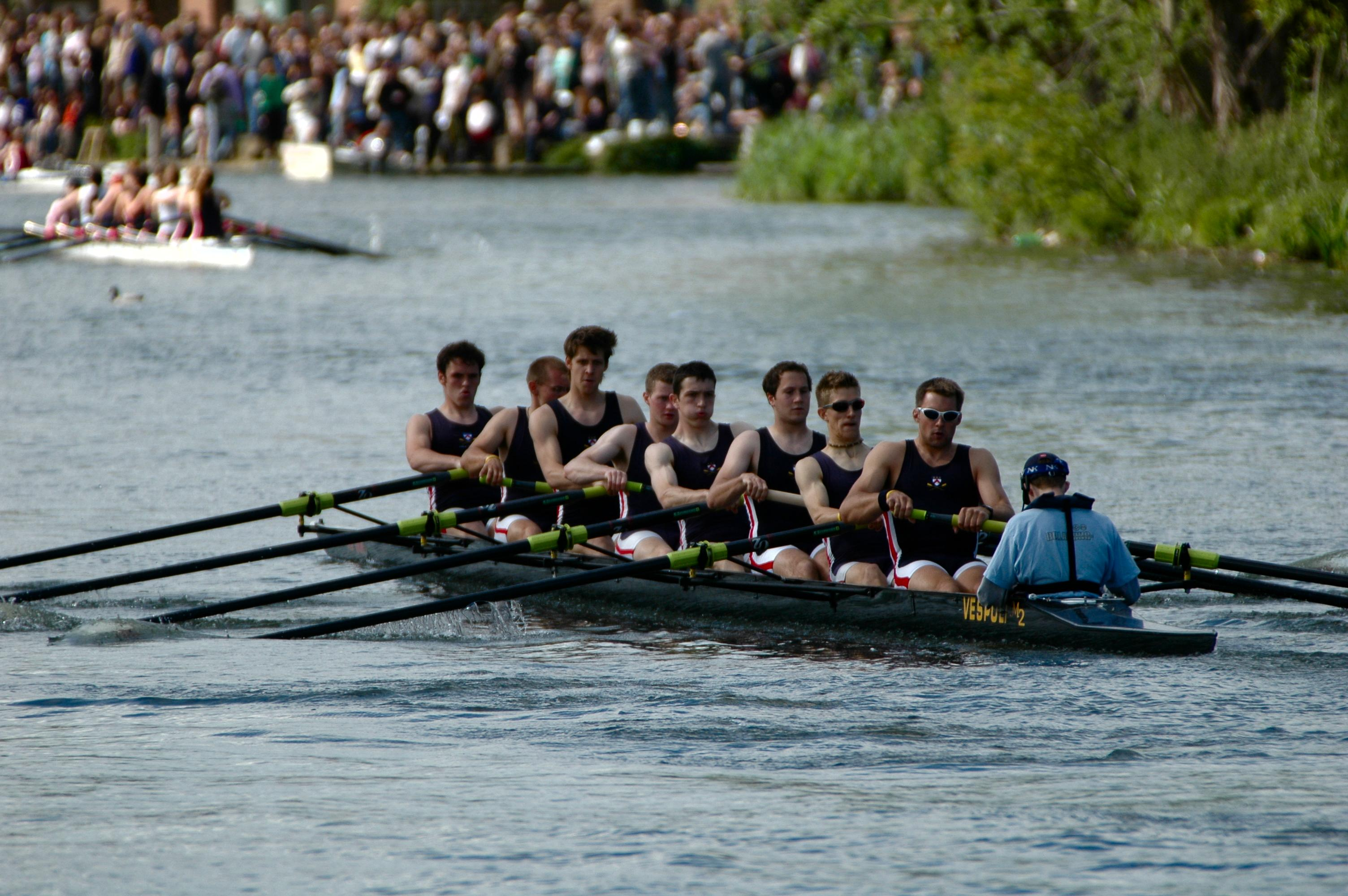
Keble M1 at Summer Eights 2005

== Coaching ==
Several high-class coaches are looking after both senior boats and novice rowers. Recent coaches include among others Harry Brightmore and Freddie Davidson, as well as Tim Foster, who also rowed for Keble.

== Training and equipment ==
In addition to the water training, the boat club uses the college gym and its own erg room. KCBC is sponsored by Child Bereavement UK. The club has a fleet of eights. There are also a number of fours, pairs, doubles, and singles available to students, who routinely train and enter fours and small boats into regattas in Michaelmas term.

== Honours ==
=== Henley Royal Regatta ===
Year	Races won
1958	Visitors' Challenge Cup
1960	Silver Goblets & Nickalls' Challenge Cup
1962	Visitors' Challenge Cup

=== Boat Race representatives ===
The following rowers were part of the rowing club at the time of their participation in The Boat Race.

Men's boat race

Year	Name
1878	G. F. Burgess
1880	F. M. Hargreaves
1903	F. T. H. Eyre (cox)
1920	M. H. Ellis
1921	M. H. Ellis
1936	M. A. Kirke (cox)
1955	I. A. Watson (cox)
1959	D. W. Shaw
1960	I. L. Elliott
1960	J. R. Chester
1961	I. L. Elliott
1961	G. V. Cooper
1961	J. R. Chester
1962	N. D. Tinne
1962	D. D. S. Skailes
1962	R. A. Morton
1962	C. M. Strong (cox)
1963	R. A. Morton-Maskell
1963	R. C. T. Mead
1963	D. D. S. Skailes
1963	C. M. Strong (cox)
1964	J. Leigh-Wood
1964	D. W. Steel
1964	R. C. T. Mead
1964	D. D. S. Skailes
1964	D. G. Bray
1964	M. J. Leigh (cox)
1965	W. R. Fink
1965	M. J. Leigh (cox)
1966	F. C. Carr
1966	C. H. Freeman
1966	J. K. Mullard
1966	P. G. Tuke
1967	C. H. Freeman
1967	J. K. Mullard
1967	C. I. Blackwall
1967	P. G. Saltmarsh

Year	Name
1968	D. G. C. Thomson
1968	P. G. Saltmarsh
1968	W. R. Fink
1969	F. J. L. Dale
1969	H. P. Matheson
1969	J. M. Duncan
1969	W. R. C. Lonsdale
1969	P. G. Saltmarsh
1970	F. J. L. Dale
1970	A. J. Hall
1970	W. R. C. Lonsdale
1971	D. Hunt
1971	A. J. Hall
1971	F. J. L. Dale
1972	A. J. Hall
1972	M. G. C. T. Baines
1973	S. G. Irving
1973	A. J. Hall
1975	C. J. A. N. Money-Coutts
1975	R. S. Mason
1976	R. S. Mason
1976	A. J. Wiggins
1977	M. M. Moran
1977	R. S. Mason
1977	C. J. A. N. Money-Coutts
1977	A. J. Wiggins
1978	M. M. Moran
1979	A. J. Wiggins
1979	M. J. Diserens
1980	M. J. Diserens
1989	Calman A. Maclennan
1991	Calman A. Maclennan
1992	Calman A. Maclennan
1993	B. D. Robertson
1994	Andrew S. Gordon-Brown
1994	D. Robert H. Clegg
1995	Hugh S. Corroon

Year	Name
1995	D. Robert H. Clegg
1996	Ed J. Bellamy
1996	D. Robert H. Clegg
1996	Benjamin Mann
1996	Jeremy W. Howick
1997	James B. Roycroft
1997	Jordan Irving
1998	James B. Roycroft
1998	Jurgen Hecht
1998	E. R. Coode
1999	Martin Crotty
1999	Morgan A. L. Crooks
1999	Colin von Ettingshausen
1999	Neil J. O'Donnell (cox)
2002	Gerritjan Eggenkamp
2005	Jason Flickinger
2007	Terence Kookyer
2011	Alec Dent
2014	Storm Uru
2015	William Geffen
2015	Thomas Swartz
2016	Morgan Gerlak
2016	Josh Bugajski
2017	Matthew O'Leary
2017	Josh Bugajski
2017	Olivier Siegelaar
2018	Will Geffen
2021	Joshua Bowesman-Jones
2024	Harry Glenister
2026	Harry Geffen

Women's boat race

Year	Name
2016	Ruth Siddorn
2018	Renée Koolschijn
2019	Renée Koolschijn

== See also ==
- University rowing (UK)
- Keble College, University of Oxford
