= Wadham College Boat Club =

British rowing club

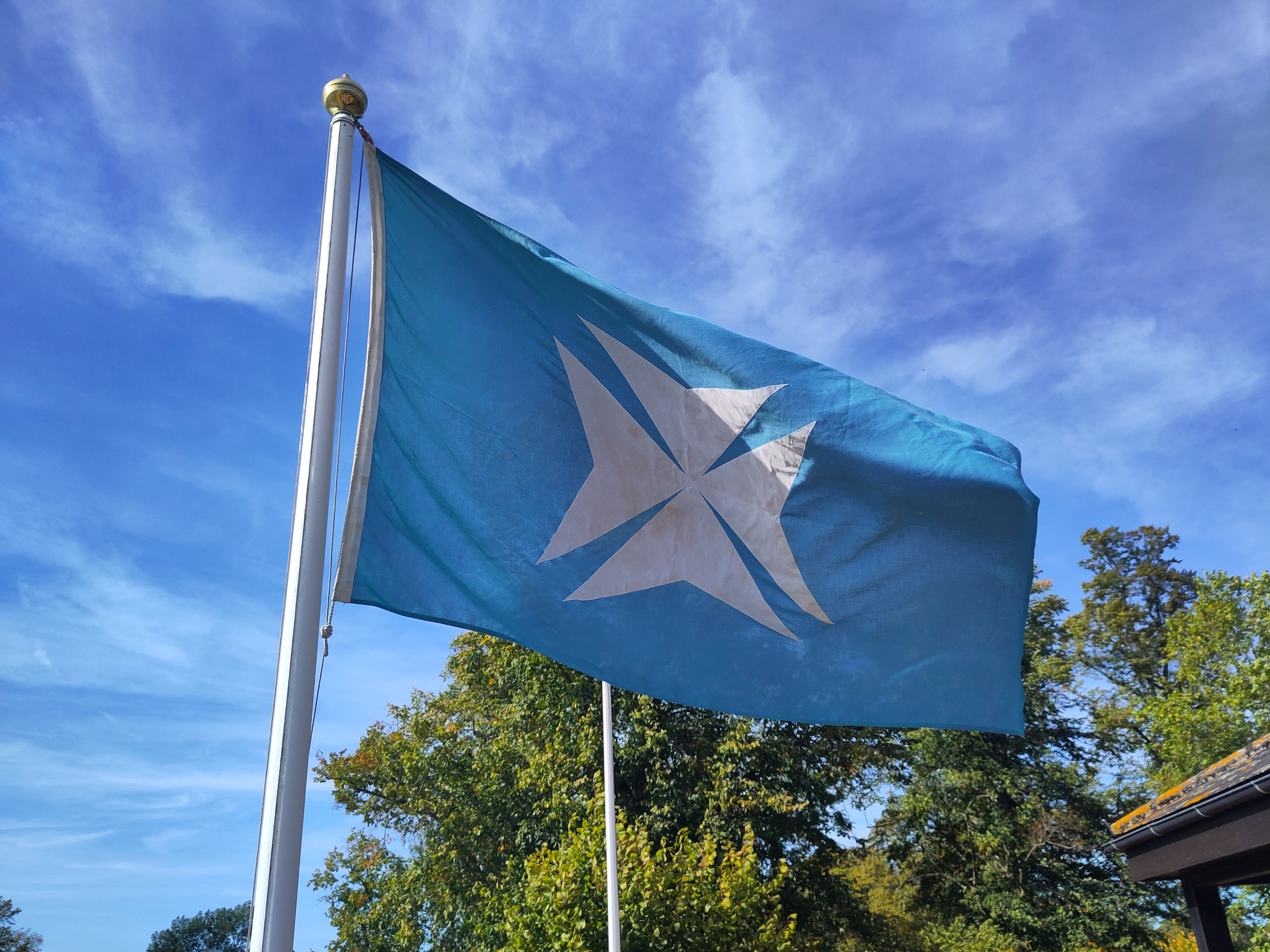

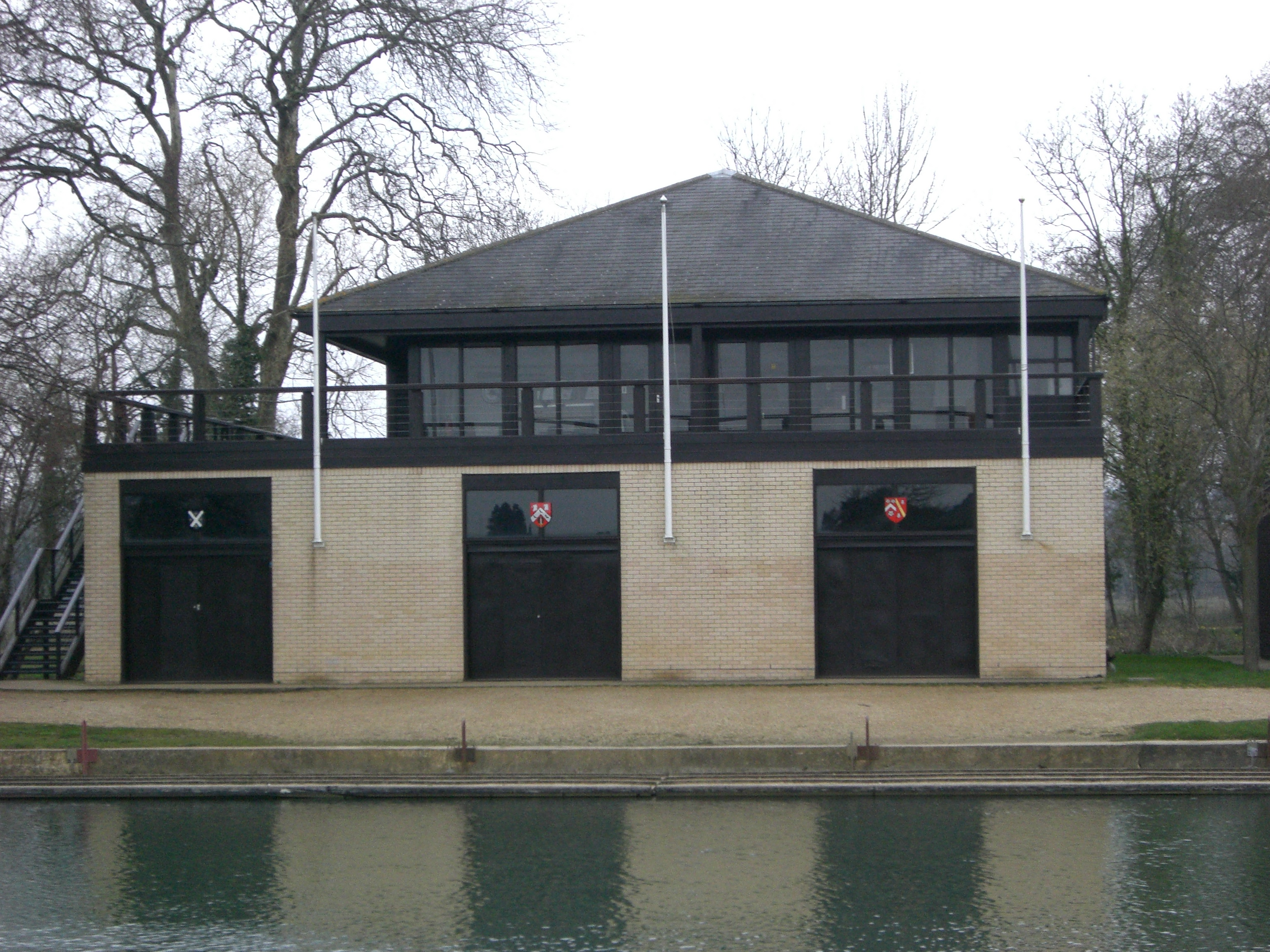

- Location: Boathouse Island, Christ Church Meadow, Oxford, England
- Coordinates: 51°44′19.3″N 1°14′47.0″W
- Home water: Isis
- Founded: c. 1837
- University: University of Oxford
- Colours
- Affiliations: British Rowing (boat code WAD); Christ's College BC (Sister college)
- Website: www.wadham.ox.ac.uk/current-students/wadham-college-boat-club
- Acronym: WCBC

Notable members
- Open President - Thomas Haward Women's President - Jay Jenkins Open Captain - Olmo Combley Women's Captain - Annabelle Wortsman

Wadham College Boat Club (WCBC) is the rowing club of Wadham College, Oxford in Oxford, England. The club is composed of students and staff from Wadham College and the adjacent Harris Manchester College. The club was founded in about 1837 and has since been successful both within Oxford college rowing and in external competitions such as Henley Royal Regatta.

The boat club is based in its boathouse on the Isis, shared with St Anne's College Boat Club and St Hugh's College Boat Club. Training also takes place in Godstow from St Edward's School's boathouse.

== History ==
The earliest surviving record of the boat club's existence are accounts for 1837, although evidence suggests it was founded during the early 1830s. Wadham competed in the first Grand Challenge Cup in 1839, losing to Trinity College, Cambridge. In 1849, Wadham competed against Trinity and Oriel College, Oxford in the Ladies' Challenge Plate and the Grand Challenge Cup. Wadham won both races with Trinity coming in second. It is said this victory led to Wadham's right to use Cambridge's blue-green for first VIII colours instead of its traditional light blue, although this is debated.

Wadham began boating from a hired barge near the mouth of the Cherwell in 1886, and permanently purchased a barge in 1897. It was sold in 1973, and the current boathouse was built in 1989.

Women were first admitted to the college in 1974, and the first women's crew was formed in 1975. After successful performances within Oxford and externally that year, the crew proceeded to win Head of the River in the first ever women's Summer VIIIs in 1976. The current women's third VIII is named the Spirit of '76 in honour of this event.

=== Recent form ===
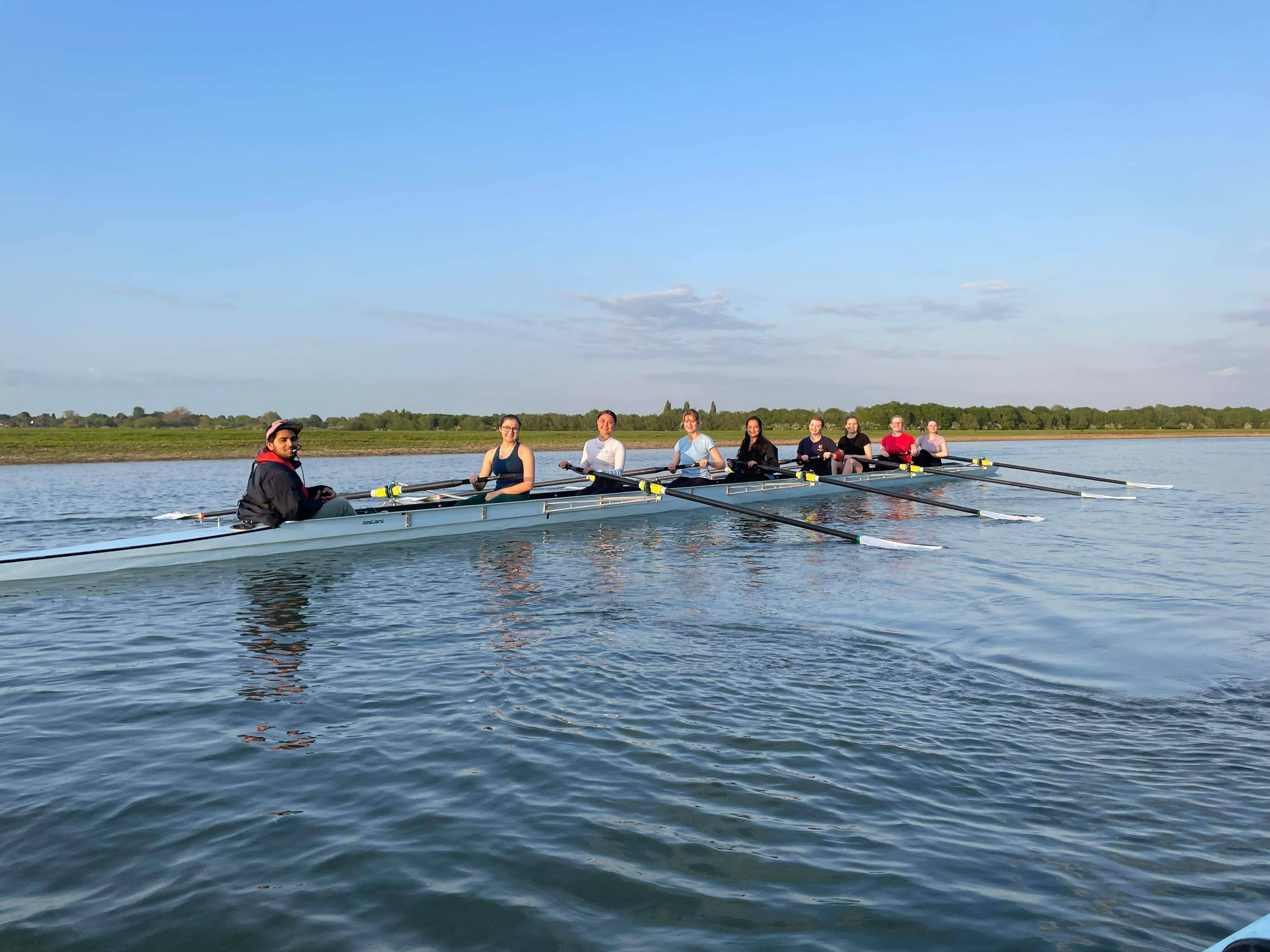
Training at Godstow

In recent years, Wadham has remained successful both within Oxford rowing and externally.

The women's first VIII last gained Torpids headship in 2019 and last won blades in Torpids in 2022. They also held headship in Summer VIIIs from 2014 to 2018. They currently sit 8th on the river for Torpids and 2nd for Summer VIIIs. They also frequently compete in external regattas such as Henley Women's Regatta, which was most recently entered in 2024.

The open (formerly men's) first VIII also remain in Division 1 for both Torpids and Summer VIIIs, currently in 11th position for both. The open second VIII won blades in Torpids 2023 and are currently the highest second VIII on the river. The open side last competed externally at the Head of the River Race in 2024.

== Club life ==
=== Membership ===
Membership of the boat club is open to all students and staff at both Wadham College and Harris Manchester College.

Additionally, both current boat club members and alumni make up the Wadham College Boat Club Society (WCBCS). The Society provides support to the boat club including advice, fundraising and donations. It also runs an annual regatta and President's Dinner, as well as an annual newsletter.

=== Social events ===
Beyond the aforementioned President's Dinner, members of the boat club enjoy a variety of social events. Both Torpids and Summer VIIIs are typically appended with formal dinners. Frequent informal social events occur throughout the year including "Captains' Cocktails", "Presidents' Prosecco" and crewdates with other colleges.

== Equipment ==
Fleet

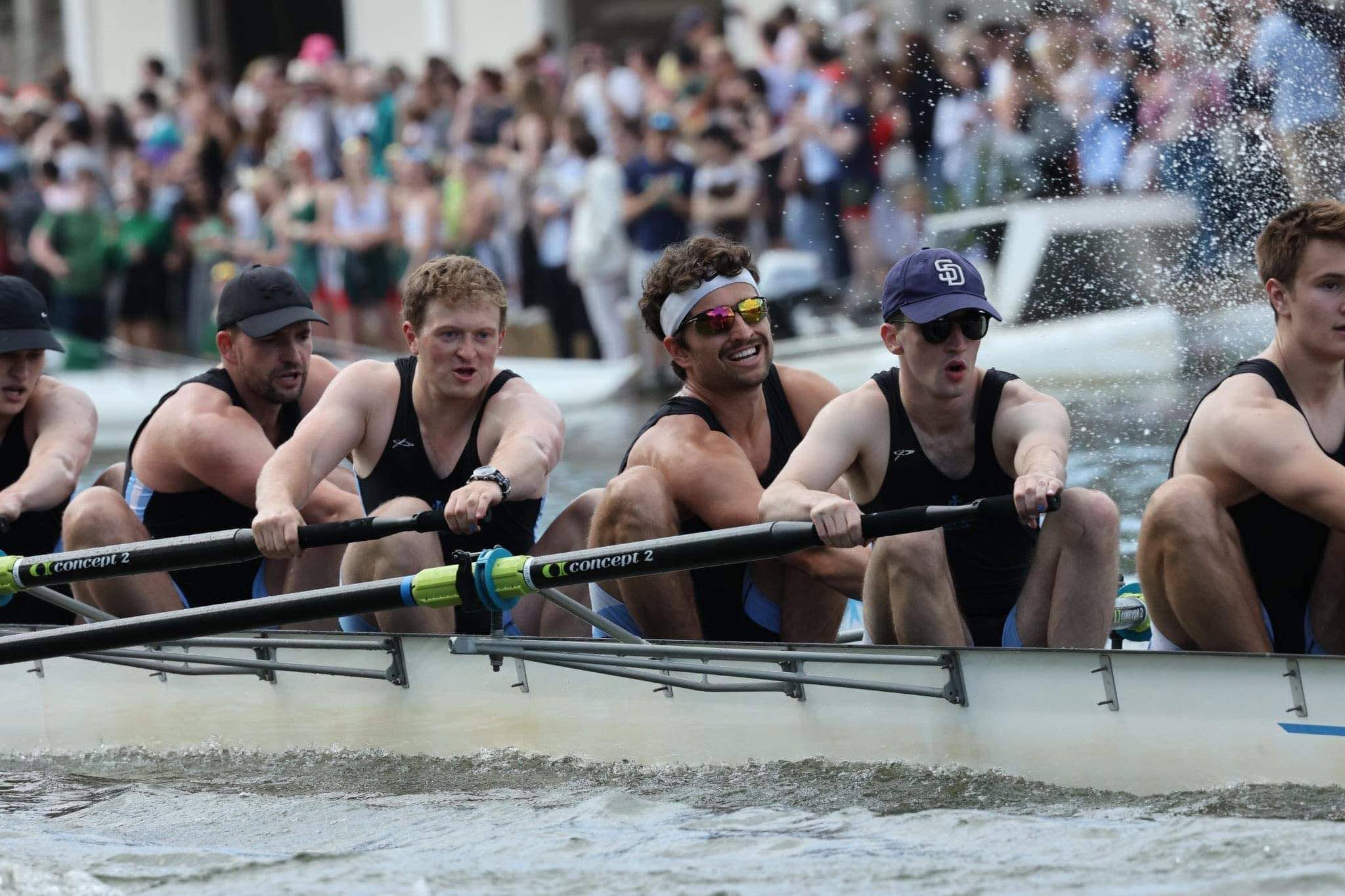
Wadham M1, Summer Eights 2022

Open boats

- 1996 Janousek 8+ "Spirit of Nelson"
- 2014 Filippi 8+ "Kristanne Claire"
- 2016 Filippi 4+ "Paul Bowen"
- 2018 Salani 8+ "Sir Ralph Waller"
- 2022 Filippi 8+ "Spirit of Niccolo"

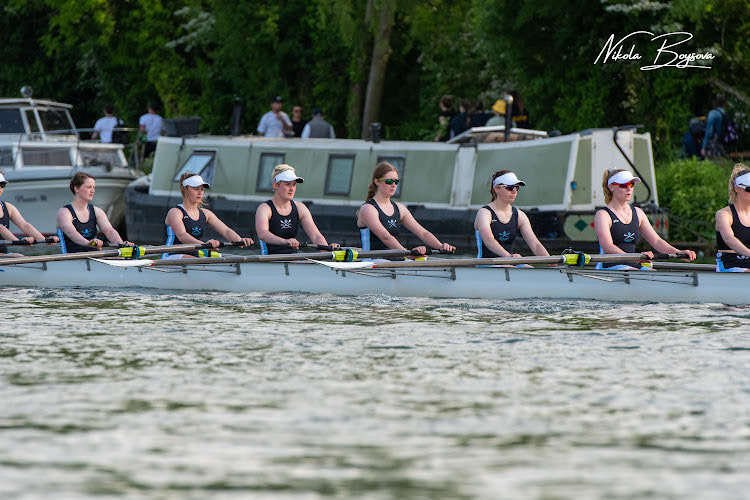
Wadham W1, Summer Eights 2023

Women's boats

- 1997 Janousek 8+ "Mary Margherita"
- 2014 Filippi 8+ "Rod Andrews"
- 2016 Filippi 4+ "Alpha"
- 2018 Salani 8+ "Spirit of 76"
- 2022 Filippi 8+ “Dorothy Wadham”

Small boats

- Pre 1994 Janousek 1x "Harry Fawcett"
- Pre 1994 Janousek 1x "Ben Arber"
- 2016 Falcon 1x "Dorothy"
- 2017 Falcon 1x "Vere Ducker"

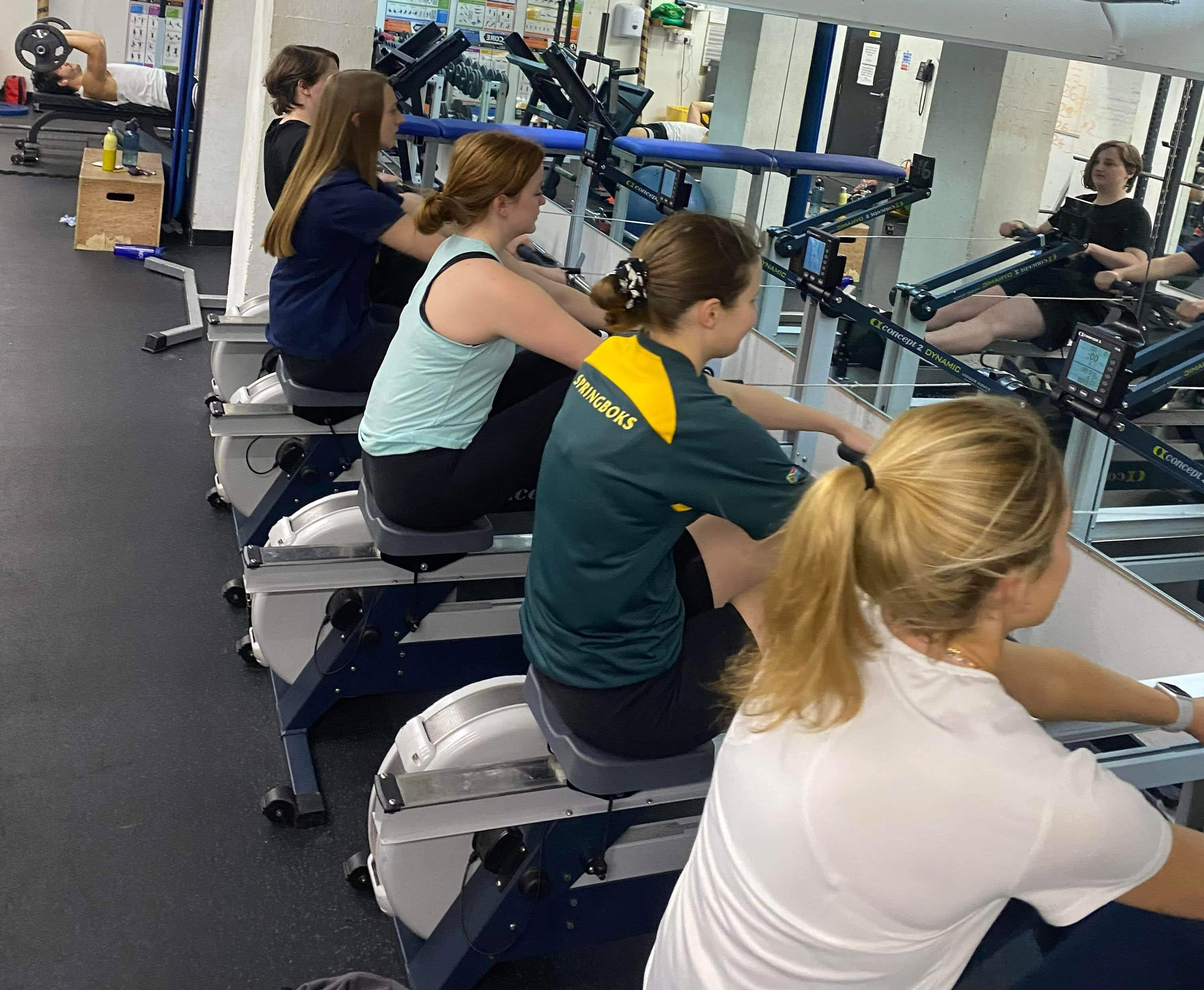
Ergs in the College Gym

Ergometers

The boat club has eight dynamic Concept2 ergometers in the Wadham College gym, and eight static Concept2 ergs in its boathouse.

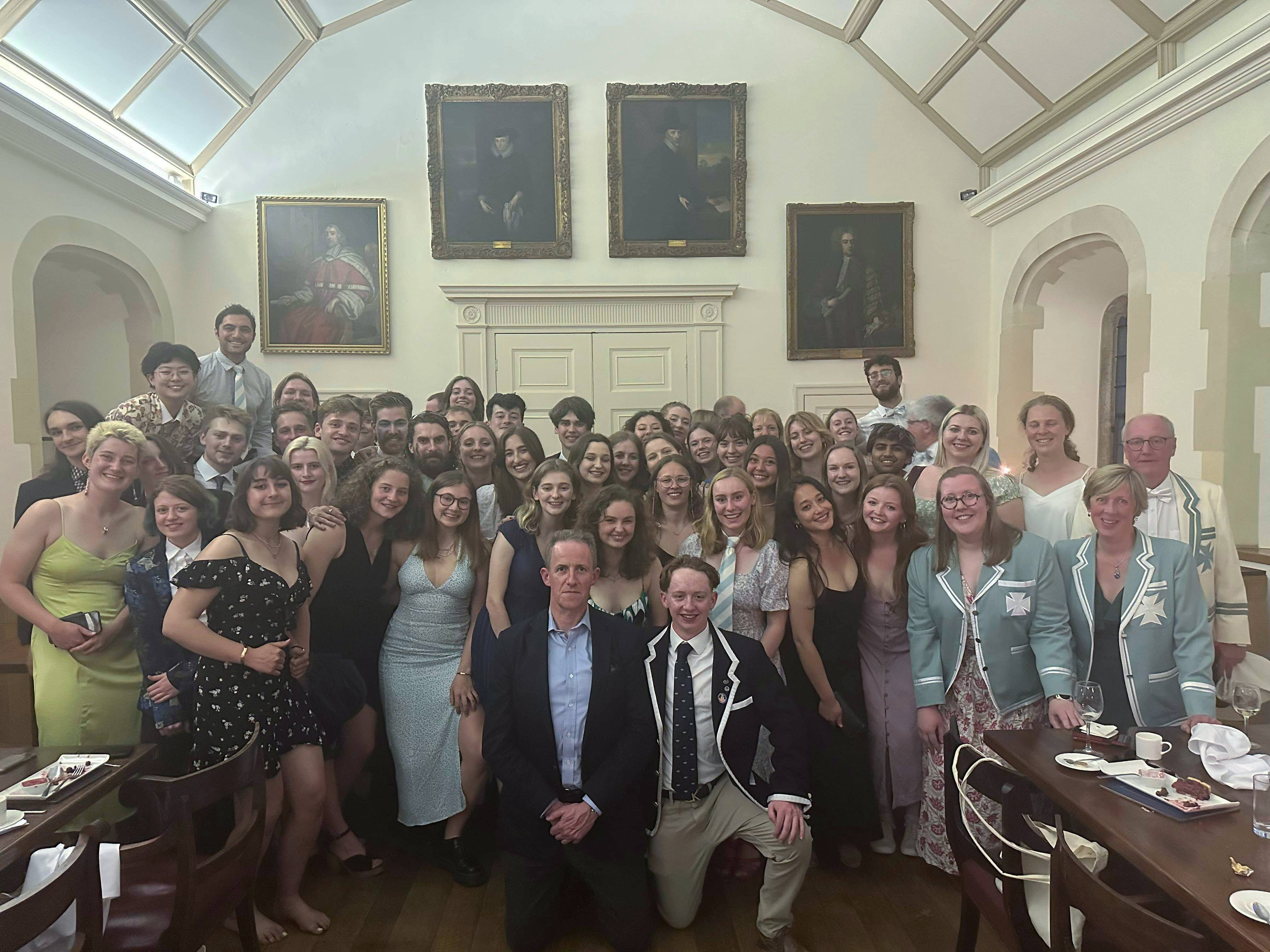
Wadham College Boat Club at Eights Dinner 2023

== Honours ==
=== Boat Race representatives ===
The following rowers were part of the rowing club at the time of their participation in The Boat Race.

Men's boat race

Year	Name
1849	D. Wauchope
1856	J. T. Thorley
1857	J. T. Thorley
1858	J. T. Thorley
1861	H. E. Medlicott
1861	W. Robertson
1861	S. O. B. Risdale (cox)
1862	C. R. Carr
1863	C. R. Carr
1874	W. F. A. Lambert (cox)
1886	W. St L. Robertson
1889	T. A. Cook
1902	G. C. Drinkwater
1903	G. C. Drinkwater
1910	R. H. Owen
1979	C. P. Berners-Lee (cox)
1981	S. Brown (cox)
1981	S. Brown (cox)
1987	Gavin B. Stewart
1988	Gavin B. Stewart
2019	Patrick Sullivan

Women's boat race

Year	Name
2015	Maddy Badcott
2016	Maddy Badcott

Men's boat race (Harris Manchester)

Year	Name
2006	Tom Parker

Women's boat race (Harris Manchester)

Year	Name
2021	Georgina Gran

=== Henley Royal Regatta ===
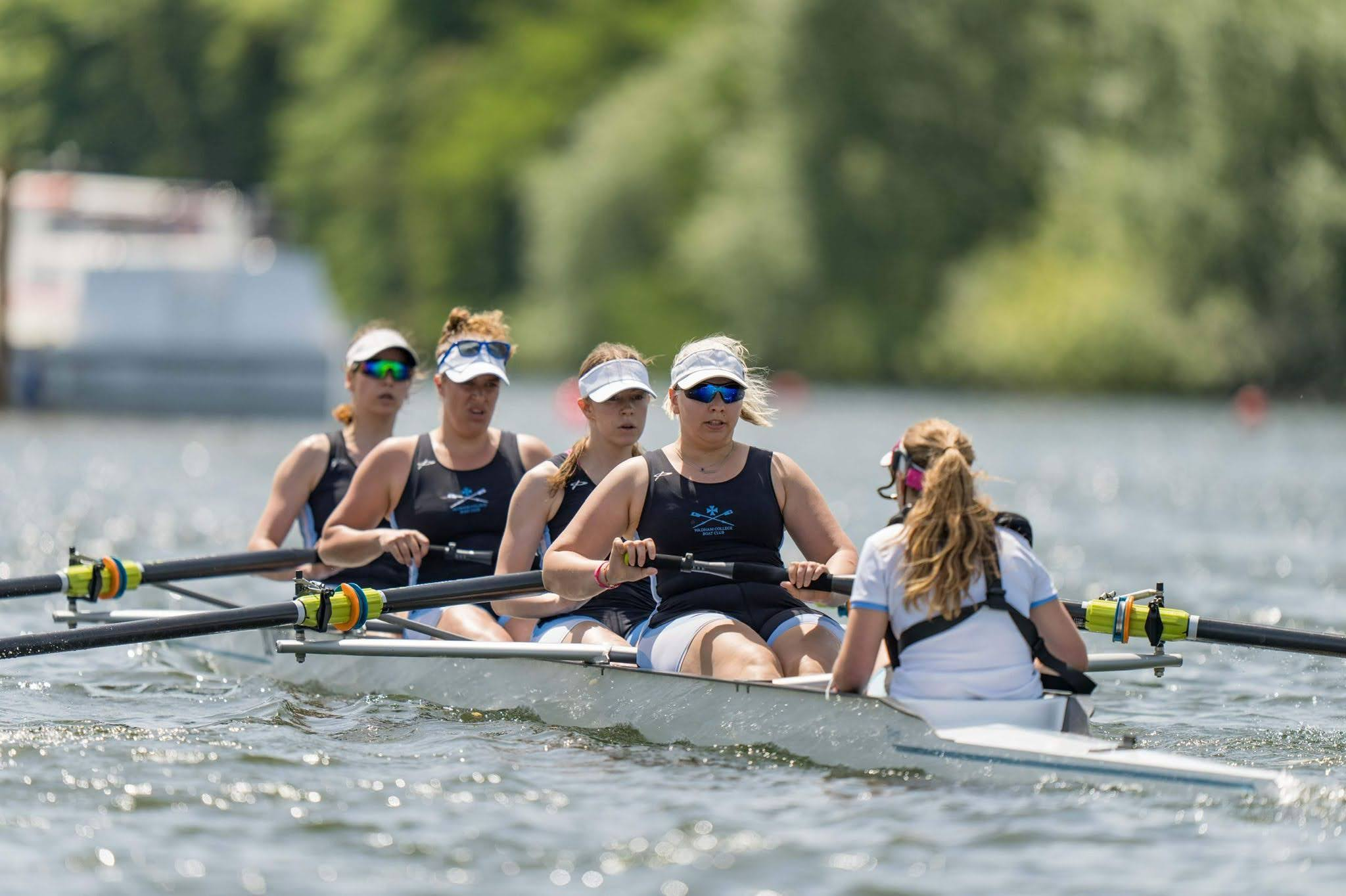
Wadham Women at Henley Women's Regatta 2022

Year	Races won
1849	Grand Challenge Cup
1849	Ladies' Challenge Plate
1908	Thames Challenge Cup
1909	Thames Challenge Cup

=== Torpids ===
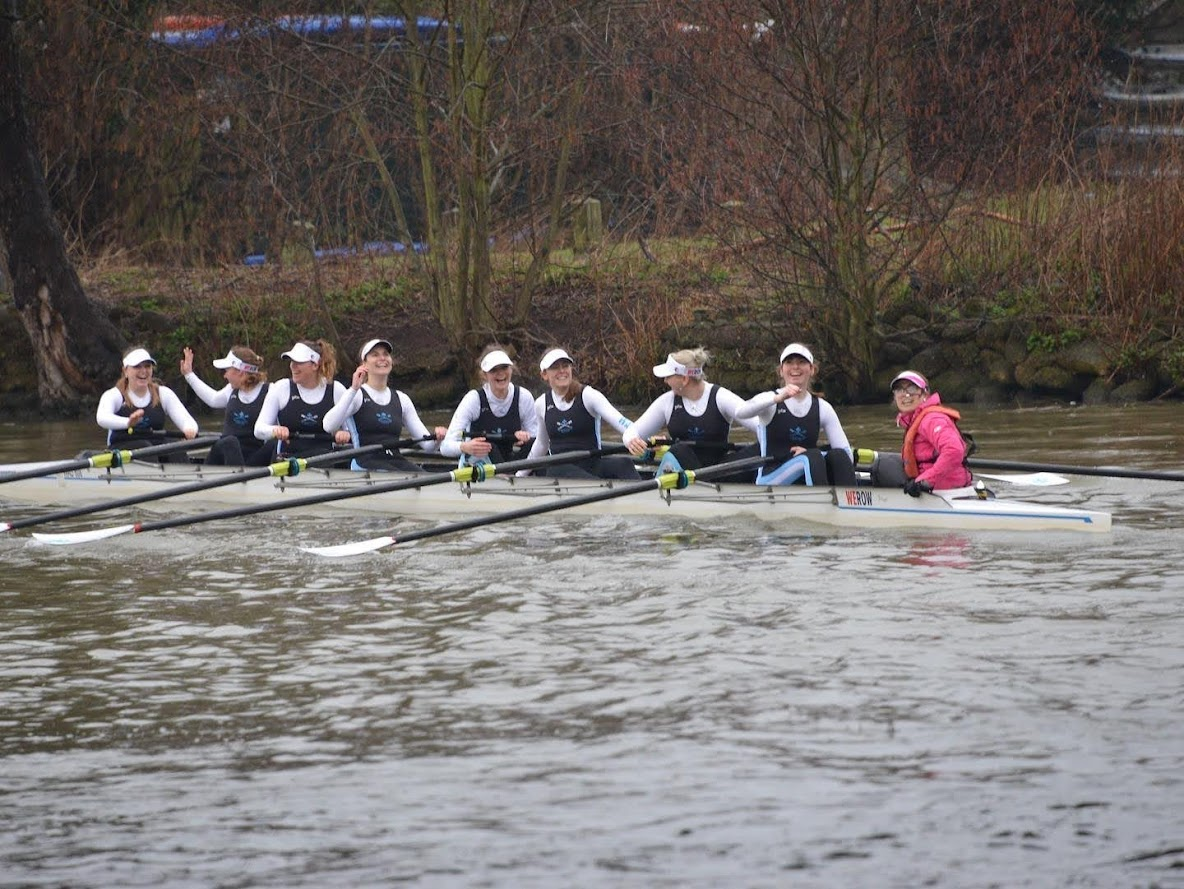
Wadham W1 winning Division 1 blades in Torpids 2022

Year	Results
2012	M2 Blades
2013	W2 2nd VIII Headship
2014	M2 Blades
2015	W1 Headship, M3 Blades (3rd VIII Headship), W2 Blades (2nd VIII Headship)
2018	M3 Blades
2019	W1 Headship
2022	W1 Blades
2023	M2 Blades (2nd VIII Headship)

=== Summer Eights ===
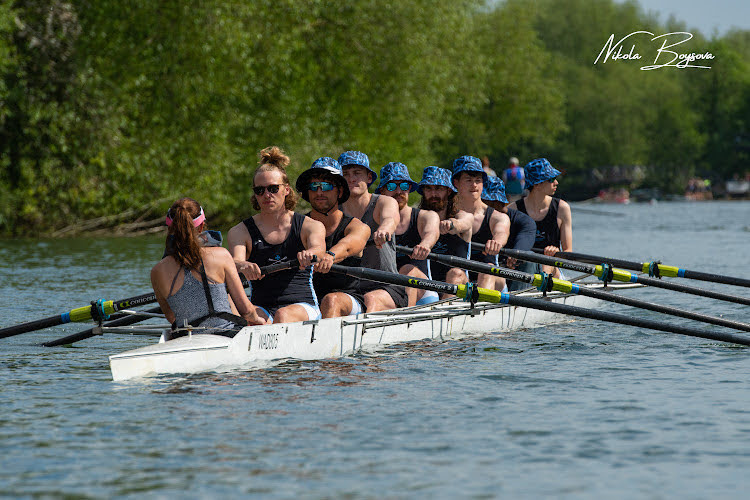
Wadham M2's 'Wizards' at Summer VIIIs 2023

Year	Results
2013	W2 Blades (2nd VIII Headship)
2014	W1 Headship, W2 2nd VIII Headship
2015	W1 Headship, W2 2nd VIII Headship
2016	W1 Headship, W3 Blades
2017	W1 Headship
2025	W3 Blades, M3 Blades

=== Tamesis Regatta ===
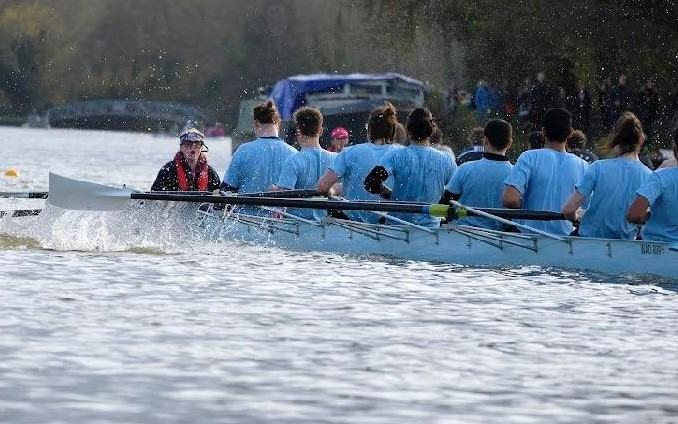
Novice Men's A Boat during Michaelmas Novice Regatta 2022

Year	Results
2016	NM1 Winners
2017	NW1 Winners
2018	NW1 Winners

- Formerly Christchurch Regatta or Michaelmas Novice Regatta

=== Oriel Regatta ===
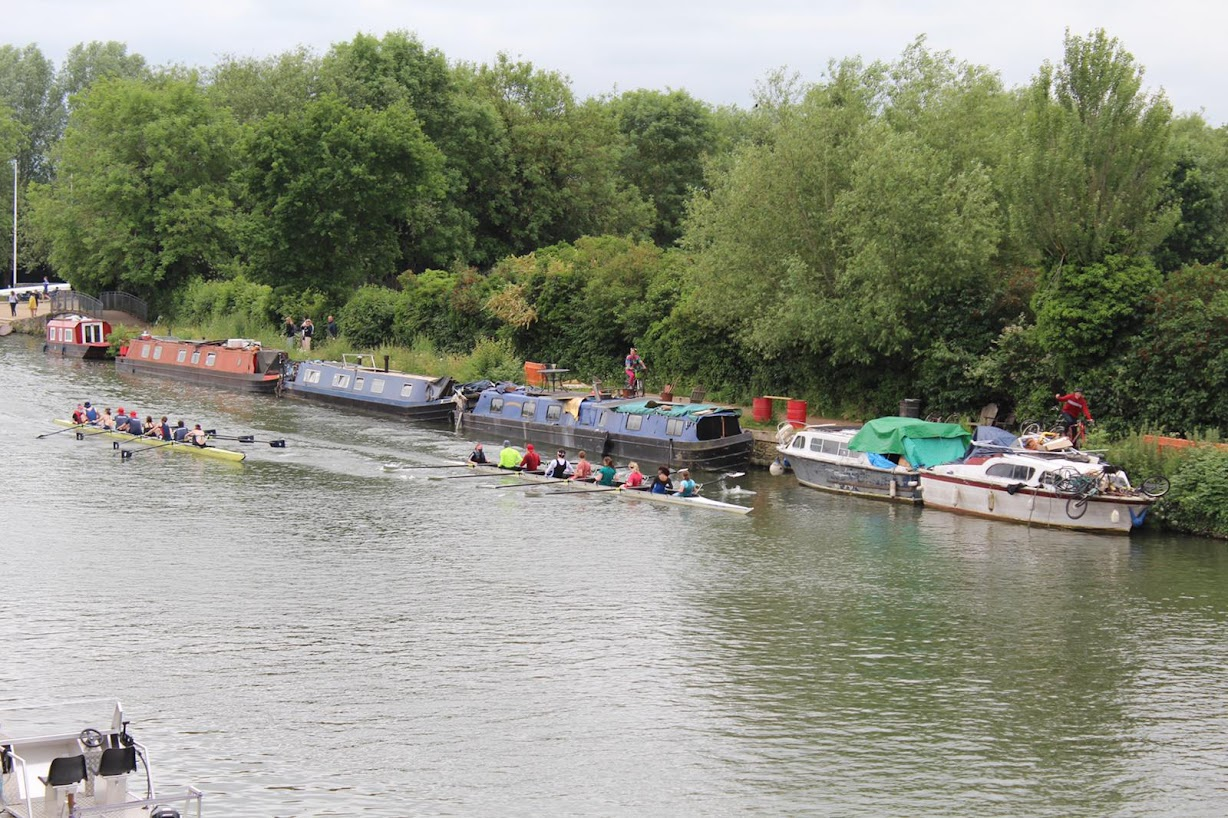
WCBC Mixed Crew at Oriel Regatta 2021

Year	Results
2013	W1 W 8+ Winners

=== Autumn Fours ===
Year	Results
2025	W1 Winners
