= Eights Week =

Series of rowing races at the University of Oxford

- Summer Eights
- Head of the River
Oriel College Men	University College Women
Highest 2^{nd} Eight (Men)	Oriel College (Division II)
Highest 2^{nd} Eight (Women)	University College (Division III)
Course	Isis (upstream)
Course length	c. 1800m
- Note: Last Eights 27^{th} May – 30^{th} May 2026
- OURCs - Summer Eights

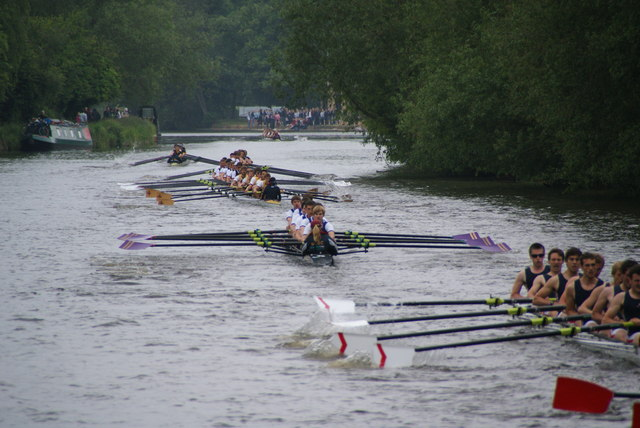
Summer Eights May 2009 Men's Division 1, showing racing between (from front) Keble College, New College, St Edmund Hall

Eights Week, also known as Summer Eights, is a four-day regatta of bumps races which constitutes the University of Oxford's main intercollegiate rowing event of the year. The regatta takes place in May of each year, from the Wednesday to the Saturday of the fifth week of Trinity Term. Men's and women's eights compete in separate divisions for their colleges.

== Overview ==
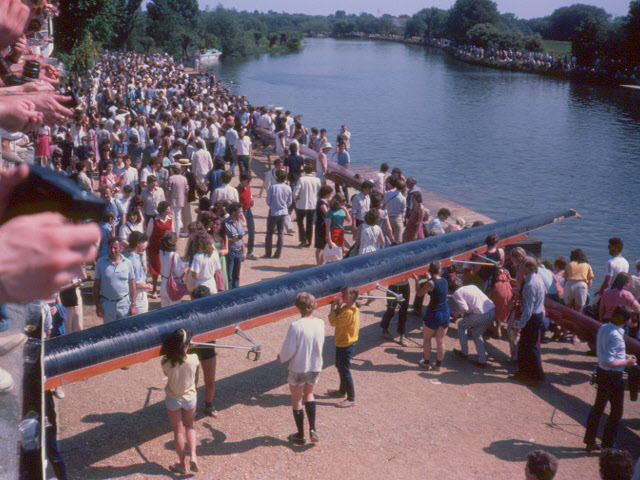
A busy riverbank scene as a boat is returned to one of the college boathouses in Summer Eights 1982

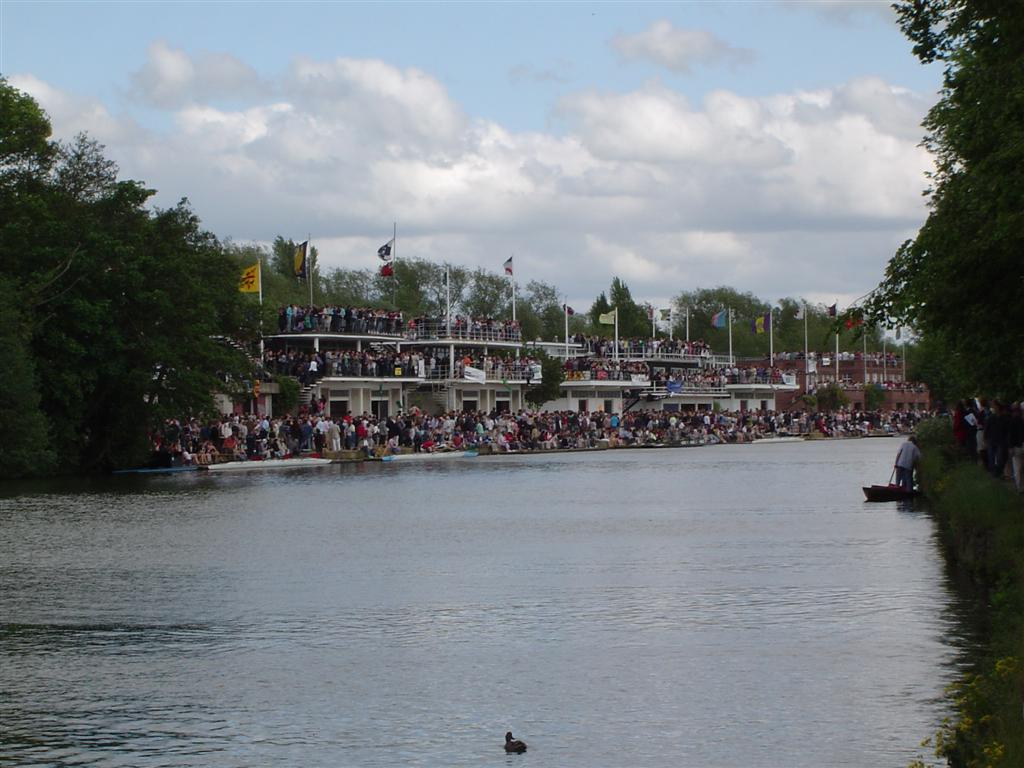
The scene at Boathouse Island during Summer Eights 2005, crammed with spectators awaiting the next race

The racing takes place on the Isis, a length of the River Thames, which is generally too narrow for side by side racing. For each division, twelve boats line up at the downstream end of the stretch, each cox holding onto a rope attached to the bank, leaving around 1.5 boat lengths between each boat. The start of racing is signalled by the firing of a cannon, each crew attempting to progress up their division by bumping the boat in front, while avoiding being bumped by the boat behind. Once a bump has taken place, both of the crews involved stop racing and move to the side to allow the rest of the division to pass. It is possible to "over bump" if the 2 crews in front of your boat bump (and so drop out) and your boat can catch the boat that was in front of them. They then swap places for the next day's racing, whether that be the calendar day or the first day of racing in the next year's competition.

The ultimate aim of a crew is to become "Head of the River" (top of the first division) and stay there. This entitles the winning crew to commission trophy oars in their college colours with the names and weights of the successful crew on them—commonly called "winning blades". As this is only possible for crews already near the top of division one, another way to win blades is to bump on each day of the competition.

The "Double Headship" is an accolade awarded to any college finishing with both their men's and women's crews at the "Head of the River" in their respective divisions. This feat has only ever been achieved once, by Pembroke College in 2003. A silver "Double Headship Trophy" was commissioned from the silversmith Peter Musson in 2003, to commemorate the historic occasion.

== History ==
Although regular races between professional watermen had been known since 1715 when Doggett's Coat and Badge was instituted, amateur racing was unknown before 1808. Meanwhile, recreational rowing had begun in Oxford very much earlier, with students rowing in single wherries at least as early as 1769.

The first amateur races between organised clubs which prepared and trained for the event began in Oxford in 1815. In this year, crews from Brasenose College and Jesus College raced for the Head of the River, from Iffley Lock to Mr King's Barge, which was moored near the current Head of the River hotel. The event is also notable for the fact that both crews rowed in eight oared boats, specially built for the purpose. Such recreational rowing as occurred at this time was usually conducted in pairs, or four or six oared cutters. The fact the racing was conducted in eight oared boats gave rise to the event being known as Eights.

Brasenose College and Jesus College recontested the event in 1816, with Brasenose again triumphing. Christ Church joined in the event from 1817, when they went Head, a position they retained until 1819. Christ Church did not row in 1820. The next recorded races, between Brasenose and Jesus, were in 1821 and 1822. A dispute about professional watermen being allowed in college crews precluded racing in 1823. Until this time, Jesus and Brasenose had each used paid coaches who rowed in the stroke seats of the crews.

From 1824, Christ Church and Exeter College began racing, with Exeter going Head in that year. A rule banning the use of "out college men" (i.e. men from other colleges) rowing in college crews saw the entry of Worcester College in 1825, University and Balliol Colleges in 1827, and Oriel and Trinity Colleges in 1828.

During the COVID-19 pandemic in 2020, Summer Eights were cancelled for the first time since the Second World War. In the year after, Summer Eights were replaced by Summer Torpids, which was held instead because the 2021 Torpids races were also cancelled due to the pandemic response. Both Summer Eights and Torpids resumed as regular in 2022, using the college rankings from the end of 2019. In 2023, the Brasenose-Peter's composite crew became the first composite crew to qualify in the history of Summer Eights as well as the first to ever get a bump.

== Head of the River – Summary table (excluding World War 2 races) ==
Blade	College	Men	Women	Headships	Longest time held - Men	Longest time held - Women	Last Headship – Men	Last Headship - Women
Oriel College Boat Club	Oriel	37	-	37	1978–84 & 1996–2002	-	2026	-
Christ Church College Boat Club	Christ Church	33	2	35	1828–32	2023–24	2017	2024
Brasenose College Boat Club	Brasenose	24	-	24	1888–91 & 1928–31	-	1931	-
Magdalen College Boat Club	Magdalen	20	-	20	1892–95 & 2004–07	-	2007	-
New College Boat Club	New College	16	2	18	1896–99	2004–05	1986	2005
University College Boat Club	University	13	1	14	1896–99	-	1991	2022
Trinity College Boat Club	Trinity	13	-	13	1869–71	-	1949	-
Balliol College Boat Club	Balliol	10	2	12	1859–60 & 1955–56	2010–11	2008	2011
Pembroke College Boat Club	Pembroke	4	7	11	2013	2000–03	2013	2025
St Edmund Hall Boat Club	St Edmund Hall	5	4	9	1959–61	2006–09	1965	2009
	Keble	8	-	8	1967–1970	-	2018	-
Somerville College Boat Club	Somerville	-	8	8	-	1990–93	-	1993
Wadham College Boat Club	Wadham	2	6	8	-	2014–17	1856	2017
	Exeter	7	-	7	1882–84	-	1884	-
	Osler House^{a}	-	5	5	-	1988–89 & 1994–95	-	1995
	Osler-Green^{b}	-	4	4	-	1996–99	-	1999
St Hugh's College Boat Club	St Hugh's	-	4	4	-	1982–84	-	1984
The Queen's College Boat Club	Queen's	3	-	3	-	-	1957	-
Corpus Christi College Boat Club	Corpus Christi	2	-	2	-	-	1885	-
Hertford College Boat Club	Hertford	1	-	1	-	-	1881	-
Lady Margaret Hall Boat Club	Lady Margaret Hall	-	1	1	-	-	-	1977
Merton College Boat Club	Merton	1	-	1	-	-	1951	-
St John's College Boat Club	St John's	-	1	1	-	-	-	2013
Wolfson College Boat Club (Oxford)	Wolfson	1	1	2	-	-	2025	2019

^{a} Since 2008 this crew composition does not exist any more. Prior to the foundation of Green Templeton College members of Green College raced with Osler House whereas members of Templeton College raced with Hertford College.
^{b} Prior to the composite crew with Green College and after the foundation of Green Templeton Boat Club, Osler raced as an independent crew formed of clinical medical students.

== Head of the River – Men ==
Summer Eights has been held since 1815.

No racing occurred during World War I. In World War II, though college rowing continued, there were insufficient students for normal racing between colleges to be maintained. As a consequence, most colleges competed in composite clubs, and the number of crews competing was greatly curtailed. After the war, normal racing continued, and in 1946 college crews started in the order in which they finished in 1939.

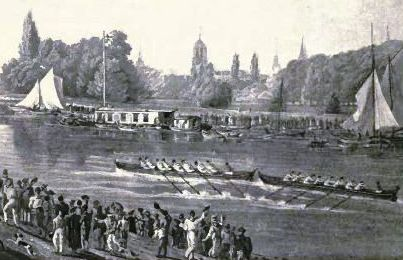
The earliest-known scene of a race between two eight-oared boats at Oxford University. It has been suggested that the picture shows the "disputed bump" of 1822 in a race between Jesus College and Brasenose College, but this is uncertain.

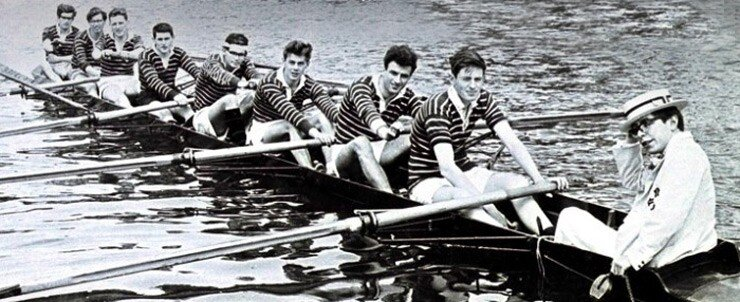
Stephen Hawking coxing the University Men's 1st VIII in 1963

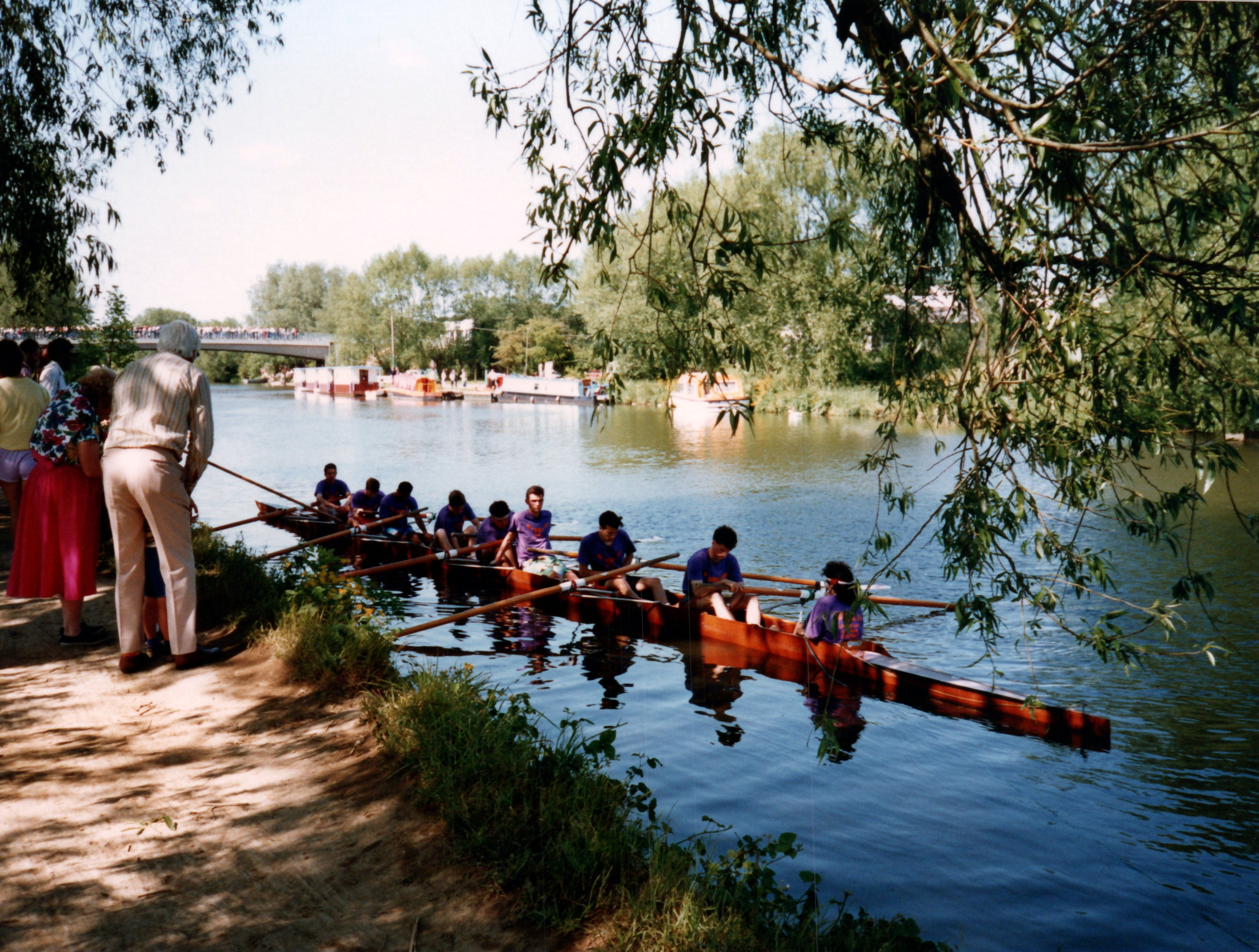
An example of a 'poleman' manoeuvring a boat into a good alignment to start. This is something unique to bumps racing.

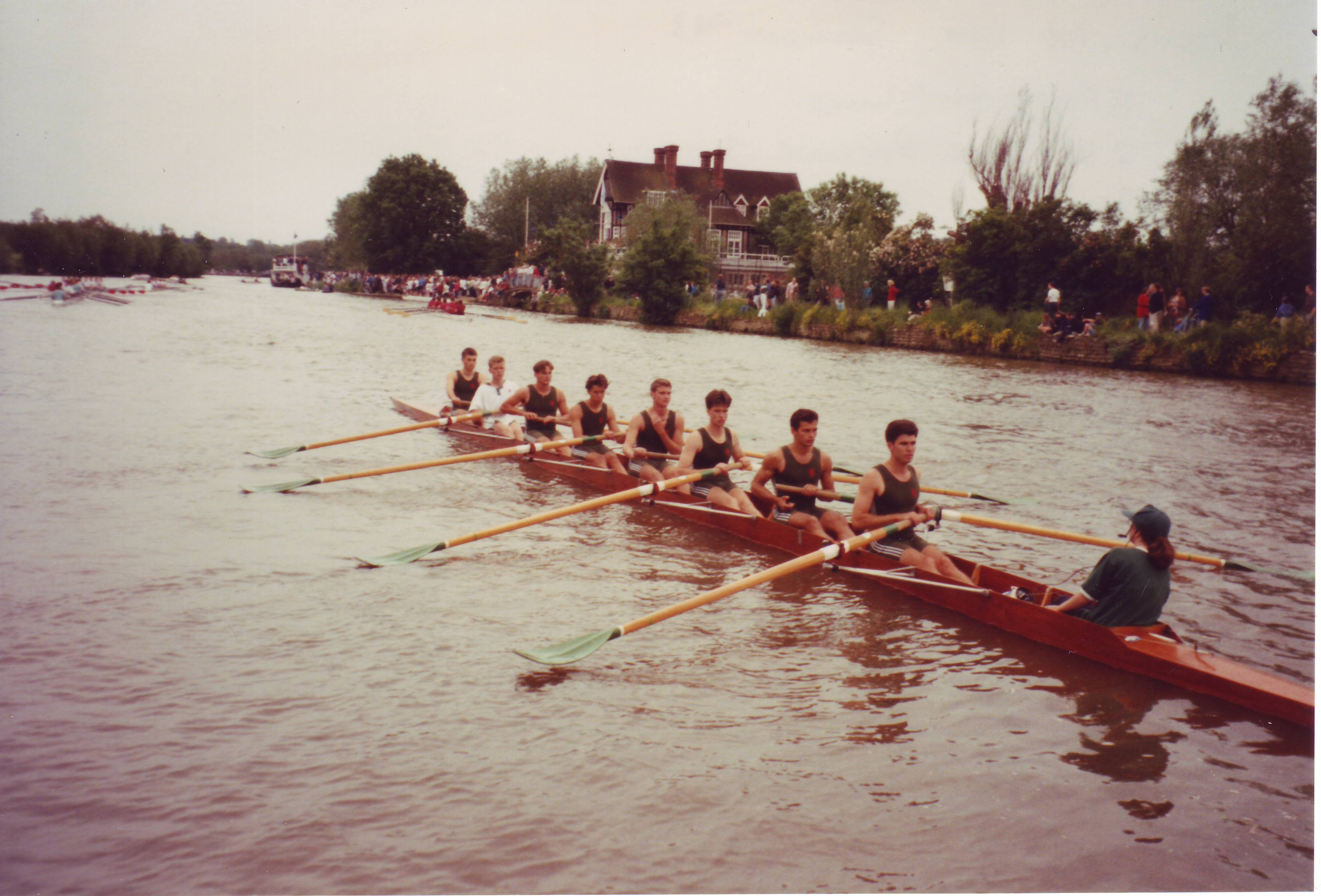
Jesus College Men's 1st VIII 1993. The original University College Boathouse which burnt down in 1999 is visible in the background.

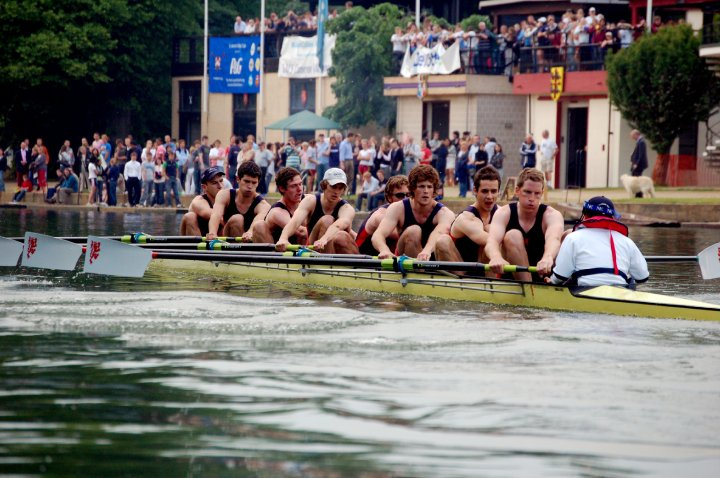
Balliol College Men's 1st VIII rowing to take the Headship in 2008

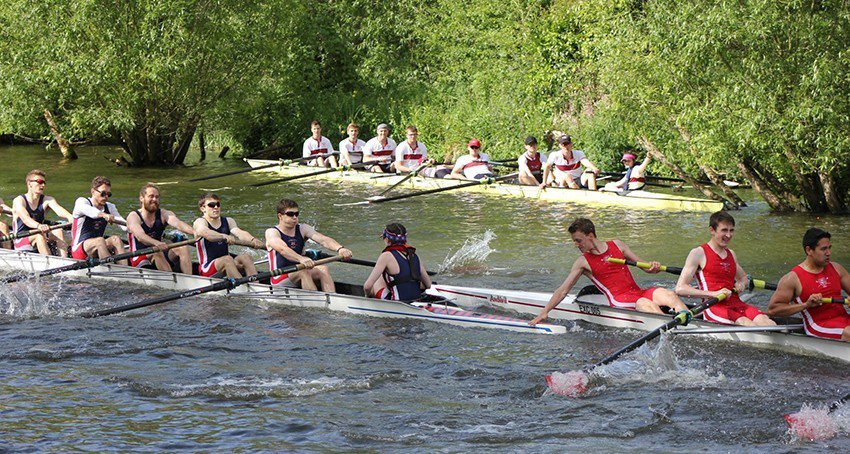
Exeter Men's 1st VIII bump St Anne's Men's 1st VIII in 2017 to reach Division II.

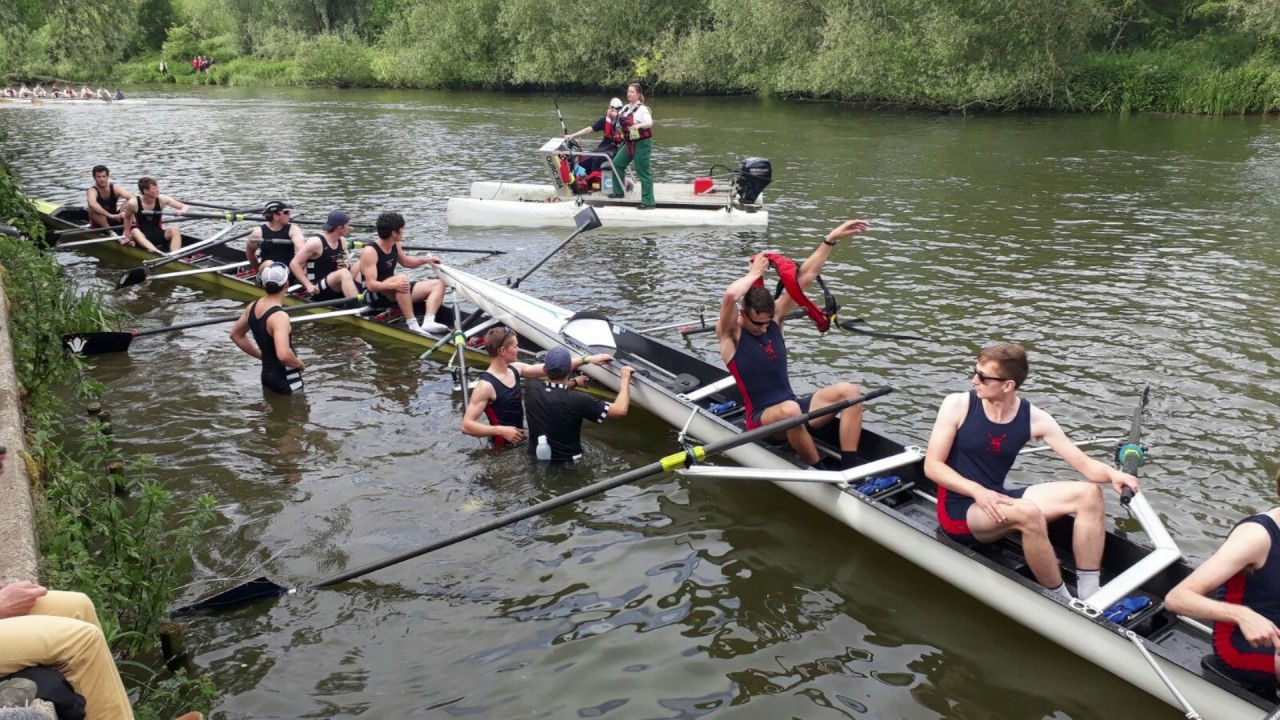
Balliol Men's 1st VIII bump Magdalen Men's 1st VIII in 2017 to secure blades. An example of the potential risks involved with bumps racing.

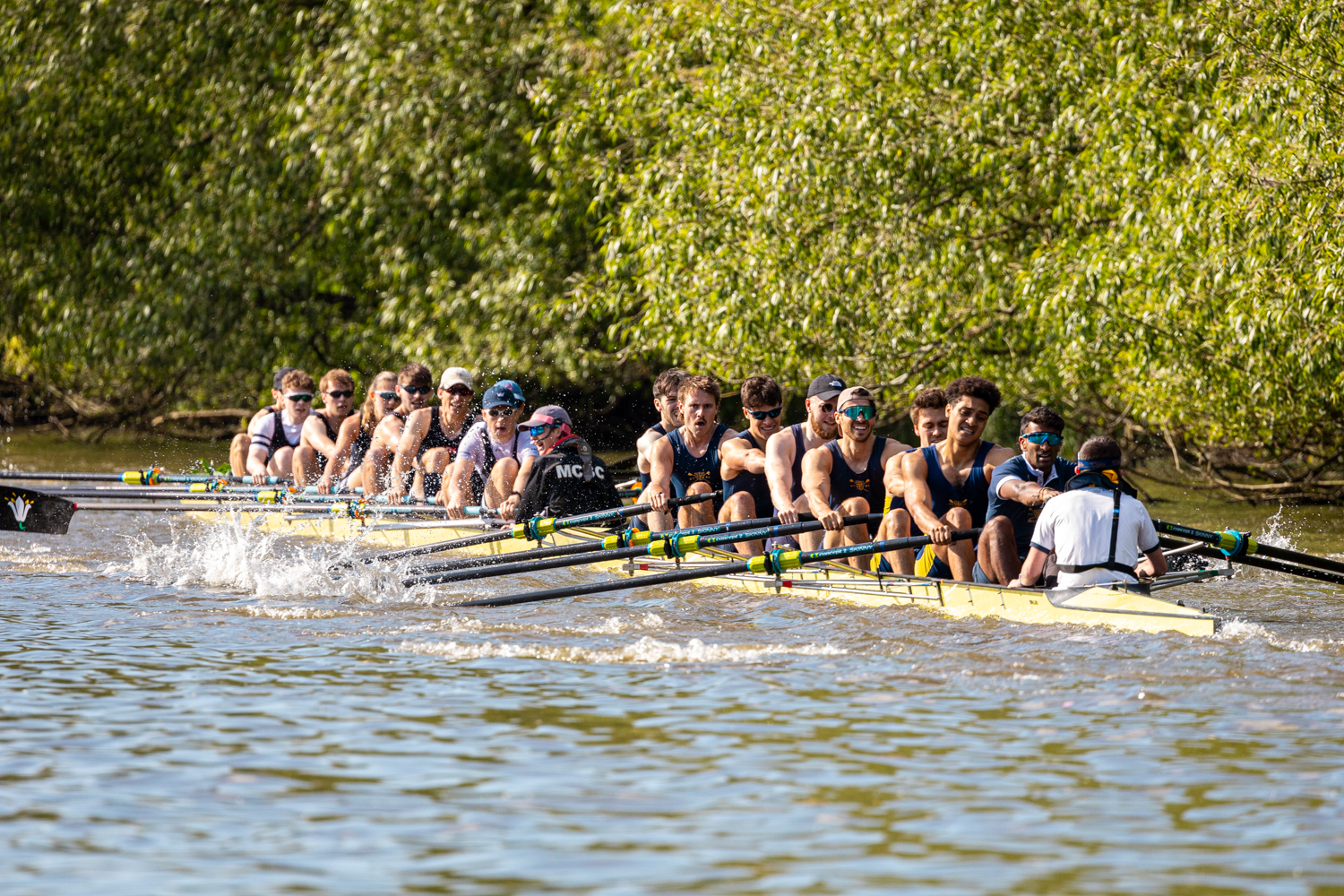
University Men's 1st VIII bump Magdalen Men's 1st VIII in 2024.

Year	College	Year	College	Year	College	Year	College	Year	College
1815	Brasenose	1816	Brasenose	1817	Christ Church	1818	Christ Church	1819	Christ Church
1820	^{a}	1821	Brasenose	1822	Brasenose	1823	^{b}	1824	Exeter
1825	Christ Church	1826	Christ Church	1827	Brasenose	1828	Christ Church	1829	^{c}
1830	Christ Church	1831	Christ Church	1832	Christ Church	1833	Queen's	1834	Christ Church
1835	Christ Church	1836	Christ Church	1837	Queen's	1838	Exeter	1839	Brasenose
1840	Brasenose	1841	University	1842	Oriel	1843	University	1844	Christ Church
1845	Brasenose	1846	Brasenose	1847	Christ Church	1848	Christ Church	1849	Christ Church
1850	Wadham	1851	Balliol	1852	Brasenose	1853	Brasenose	1854	Brasenose
1855	Balliol	1856	Wadham	1857	Exeter	1858	Exeter	1859	Balliol
1860	Balliol	1861	Trinity	1862	Trinity	1863	Trinity	1864	Trinity
1865	Brasenose	1866	Brasenose	1867	Brasenose	1868	Corpus Christi	1869	University
1870	University	1871	University	1872	Pembroke	1873	Balliol	1874	University
1875	University	1876	Brasenose	1877	University	1878	University	1879	Balliol
1880	Magdalen	1881	Hertford	1882	Exeter	1883	Exeter	1884	Exeter
1885	Corpus Christi	1886	Magdalen	1887	New College	1888	Magdalen	1889	Brasenose
1890	Brasenose	1891	Brasenose	1892	Magdalen	1893	Magdalen	1894	Magdalen
1895	Magdalen	1896	New College	1897	New College	1898	New College	1899	New College
1900	Magdalen	1901	New College	1902	University	1903	New College	1904	New College
1905	Magdalen	1906	Magdalen	1907	Christ Church	1908	Christ Church	1909	Christ Church
1910	Magdalen	1911	New College	1912	New College	1913	New College	1914	University
1915	^{d}	1916	^{d}	1917	^{d}	1918	^{d}	1919	Magdalen
1920	Magdalen	1921	New College	1922	New College	1923	Magdalen	1924	Christ Church
1925	Christ Church	1926	Christ Church	1927	Christ Church	1928	Brasenose	1929	Brasenose
1930	Brasenose	1931	Brasenose	1932	Magdalen	1933	Oriel	1934	Oriel
1935	Oriel	1936	Oriel	1937	New College	1938	Trinity	1939	Trinity
1940	Trinity & Balliol	1941	New College & Magdalen	1942	Brasenose, Christ Church, & Pembroke	1943	^{e}	1944	Magdalen
1945	Magdalen	1946	Trinity	1947	Trinity	1948	Trinity	1949	Trinity
1950	New College	1951	Merton	1952	Balliol	1953	Magdalen	1954	Magdalen
1955	Balliol	1956	Balliol	1957	Queen's	1958	Christ Church	1959	St Edmund Hall
1960	St Edmund Hall	1961	St Edmund Hall	1962	Christ Church	1963	Keble	1964	St Edmund Hall
1965	St Edmund Hall	1966	Oriel	1967	Keble	1968	Keble	1969	Keble
1970	Keble	1971	Christ Church	1972	Keble	1973	Christ Church	1974	Christ Church
1975	Christ Church	1976	Oriel	1977	Keble	1978	Oriel	1979	Oriel
1980	Oriel	1981	Oriel	1982	Oriel	1983	Oriel	1984	Oriel
1985	Christ Church	1986	New College	1987	Oriel	1988	Oriel	1989	Oriel
1990	University	1991	University	1992	Oriel	1993	Oriel	1994	Oriel
1995	Pembroke	1996	Oriel	1997	Oriel	1998	Oriel	1999	Oriel
2000	Oriel	2001	Oriel	2002	Oriel	2003	Pembroke	2004	Magdalen
2005	Magdalen	2006	Magdalen	2007	Magdalen	2008	Balliol	2009	Christ Church
2010	Christ Church	2011	Oriel	2012	Oriel	2013	Pembroke	2014	Oriel
2015	Oriel	2016	Oriel	2017	Christ Church	2018	Keble	2019	Oriel
2020	-^{f}	2021	^{g}	2022	Oriel	2023	Oriel	2024	Oriel
2025	Wolfson	2026	Oriel						

^{a} Unknown whether any racing occurred
^{b} No racing took place owing to a dispute over whether professional watermen were legitimate crew members
^{c} No racing owing to the first varsity boat race
^{d} No racing owing to World War I
^{e} No racing owing to World War II
^{f} No racing owing to the COVID-19 pandemic
^{g} No racing owing to the postponement of Torpids to Trinity Term caused by the COVID-19 pandemic

== Head of the River – Women ==
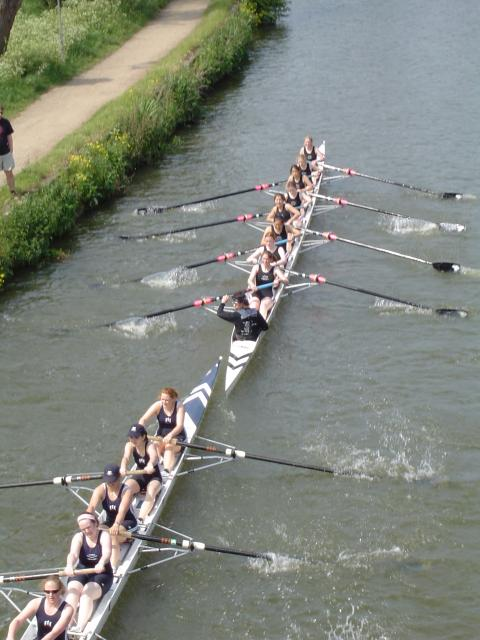
Oriel Women's Second Eight bump Magdalen Women's Second Eight on the third day of Summer Eights, 2005.

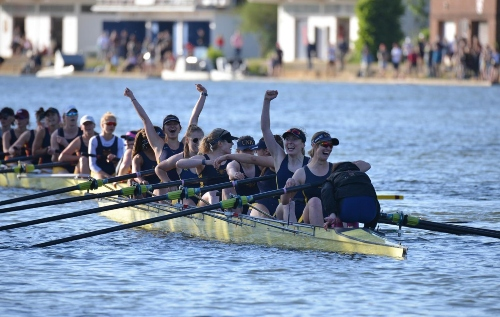
University Women's 1st VIII bump Wolfson Women's 1st VIII for Headship in 2022.

Year	College	Year	College	Year	College	Year	College	Year	College
1976	Wadham	1977	Lady Margaret Hall	1978	Wadham	1979	St Hugh's	1980	Somerville
1981	Somerville	1982	St Hugh's	1983	St Hugh's	1984	St Hugh's	1985	Osler House
1986	Somerville	1987	Somerville	1988	Osler House	1989	Osler House	1990	Somerville
1991	Somerville	1992	Somerville	1993	Somerville	1994	Osler House	1995	Osler House
1996	Osler-Green	1997	Osler-Green	1998	Osler-Green	1999	Osler-Green	2000	Pembroke
2001	Pembroke	2002	Pembroke	2003	Pembroke	2004	New College	2005	New College
2006	St Edmund Hall	2007	St Edmund Hall	2008	St Edmund Hall	2009	St Edmund Hall	2010	Balliol
2011	Balliol	2012	Pembroke	2013	St John's	2014	Wadham	2015	Wadham
2016	Wadham	2017	Wadham	2018	Pembroke	2019	Wolfson	2020	^{a}
2021	^{b}	2022	University	2023	Christ Church	2024	Christ Church	2025	Pembroke
2026	University								

^{a} No racing due to the COVID-19 pandemic
^{b} No racing due to the postponed of Torpids to Trinity Term caused by the COVID-19 pandemic.

== See also ==
- May Bumps, the equivalent event in Cambridge.
- Torpids, a similar event in Hilary Term.
- Tamesis Regatta, another series of races in Michaelmas Term.
