= Somerville College Boat Club =

UK rowing club

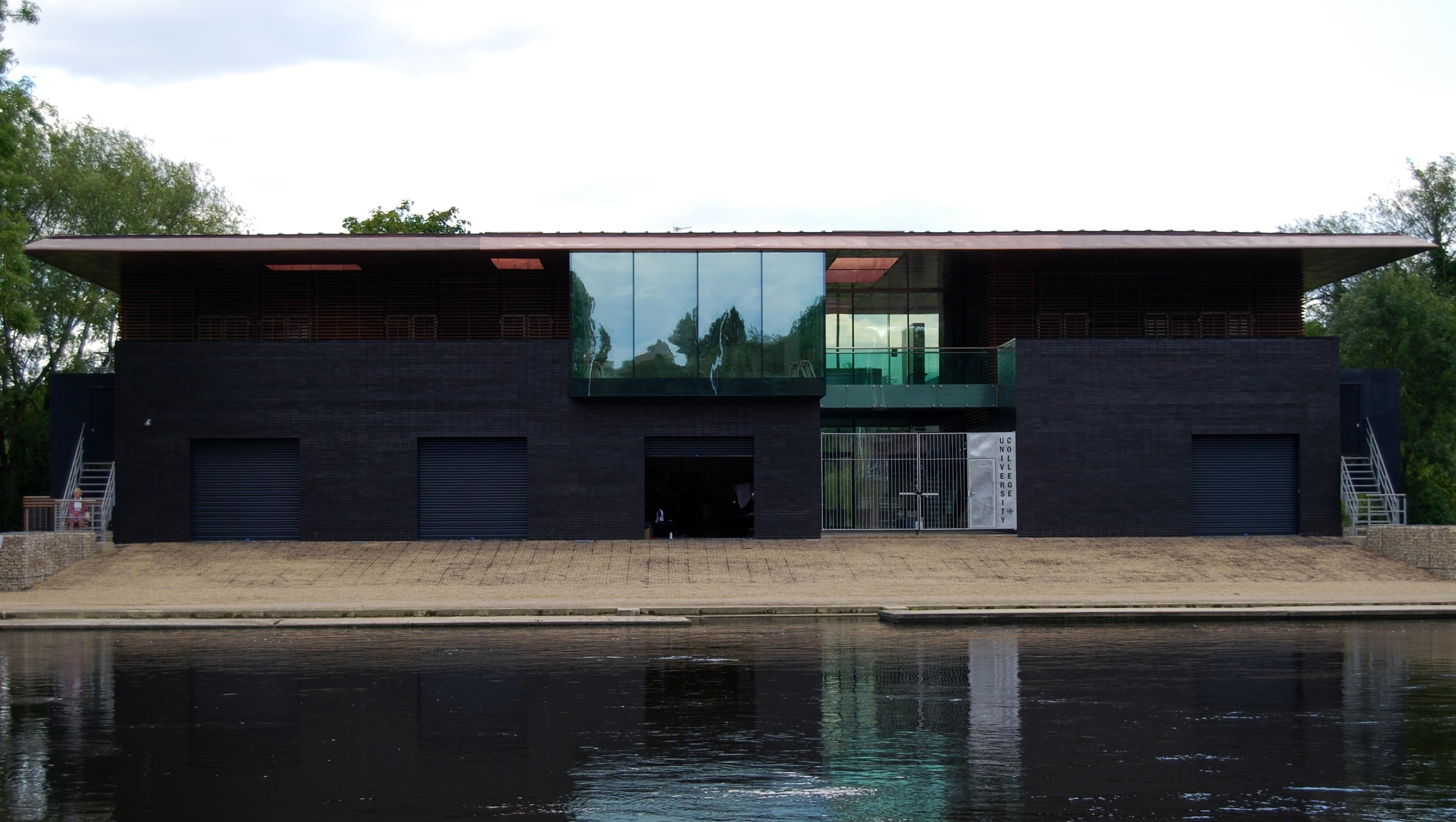

- Boathouse (owned by University College) and rowing blade colours
- Location: University College Boathouse
- Coordinates: 51.742171°N 1.24961°W
- Home water: The Isis
- Founded: 1921
- Key people: Christian Souillac (Men's Captain); Celine Zeng (Women's Captain); Tabitha Butler (Captain of Coxes)
- Head of the River: Men: Women: 8 Summer VIIIs Headships, 5 Torpids Headships
- University: University of Oxford
- Colours
- Affiliations: British Rowing (boat code SOM); Girton College Boat Club (Sister college)
- Website: somervilleboatclub.weebly.com

Somerville College Boat Club (SCBC) is the rowing club of Somerville College, Oxford. The club was formed in 1921 as one of the first women's clubs on the Isis. The women's team has won the title Head of the River eight times in Summer Eights and five times in Torpids, more than any other women's rowing team from the University of Oxford.

SCBC shares the University College Boathouse with University College, St Peter's College and Wolfson College. The building is owned by University College and won a Royal Institute of British Architects prize and has enjoyed a very favourable reception in the architectural world.

== History ==
The club was formed as a women's only club because Somerville College was a women's only college at the time. Women's rowing clubs were banned until 1921 and the club was unable to compete in bumps until 1969, due to fears that it might harm their reproductive abilities. A member of the club was first permitted to take part in Summer Eights in 1927, following the rejection of an earlier request in 1922.

In 1976 women were first given their own division which saw 12 colleges compete including SBC. Four years later in 1980 the W1 were Head of the River for the first time after defeating St Hugh's College Boat Club.

The college began admitting men in 1994 and in 1997 the first men's representative rowed in The Boat Race.

As of 2026, there were 4 women's and three men's boats entered to race in Summer Eights. In Summer Eights the first boats for women and men are in divisions 2 and 3 respectively. In Torpids the first boat for the women is in the middle of division 2 and the men's first boat is at the top of division 3. Somerville were also the most successful college boat club in 2026 with an average of 3.4 bumps per crew.

== Alumni ==
=== The 1921 Club ===
Named after the year of the boat club’s foundation, The 1921 Club was formally founded in 2025 at the annual Summer VIIIs boat club dinner. The club is open to all former members of Somerville College Boat Club, and serves to foster a lifelong community amongst its members, preserve and celebrate the rowing heritage of Somerville College, support and promote rowing at the college, and to generate funds for this purpose.

=== Notable alumni ===
Somerville College Boat Club has produced four Olympic rowers:

- Fiona Freckleton, bronze medalist in the Women's Pairs at the 1991 World Rowing Championships in Vienna - Great Britain's first medal in a major World Championship women's rowing event - also competed at the 1992 Summer Olympics and 1993 World Rowing Championships.
- Patricia Reid also competed at the 1992 Summer Olympics, having achieved silver and bronze at the 1986 Commonwealth Games.
- Luka Grubor, gold medalist at the 2000 Summer Olympics, 2002 World Rowing Championships and 1993 Nations Cup, silver medalist at the 1999 World Rowing Championships.
- Jennifer Goldsack, competed at the 2008 Summer Olympics; gold medalist at the 2011 Pan American Games and silver medalist at the 2007 World Rowing Championships.

Other notable members of the SCBC were Lucy Sutherland and Dominica Legge.

== Honours ==
=== Boat Race representatives ===
The following rowers were part of the rowing club at the time of their participation in The Boat Race.

Men's boat race

Year	Name
1997	Luka Grubor
2023	Anna O'Hanlon (cox)
2024	Fred Roper

Women's boat race

Year	Name
2018	Juliette Perry

=== Blades and Headships ===
Year	Boat	Competition
2025	W1	Eights
2025	W2	Eights
2025	W3	Eights
2025	W1	Torpids
2019	W2	Eights
2019	M1	Eights
2017	W1	Torpids
2017	W2	Torpids
2015	W2	Torpids
2013	M3	Eights
2013	M1	Torpids
2011	M2	Eights
2009	M1	Torpids
2008	M1	Torpids
2008	W1	Torpids
1999	M1	Eights
1999	M2	Eights
1999	M1	Torpids
1999	W1	Torpids
1995	M1	Eights
1994	W1	Torpids (Head of the River)
1993	W1	Eights (Head of the River)
1993	W1	Torpids (Head of the River)
1992	W1	Eights (Head of the River)
1992	W1	Torpids (Head of the River)
1991	W1	Eights (Head of the River)
1991	W1	Torpids (Head of the River)
1990	W1	Eights (Head of the River)
1988	W2	Eights
1988	W4	Torpids
1987	W1	Eights (Head of the River)
1987	W1	Torpids (Head of the River)
1986	W1	Eights (Head of the River)
1981	W1	Eights (Head of the River)
1981	W2	Eights
1980	W1	Eights (Head of the River)
1980	W1	Torpids
1980	W2	Torpids
