= The Boat Race 2024 =

Cambridge vs Oxford university rowing race

- Date: 30 March 2024

Men's race
- Winner: Cambridge
- Margin of victory: 3 1/2 lengths
- Winning time: 18 minutes 56 seconds
- Overall record (Cambridge–Oxford): 87–81
- Umpire: Matthew Pinsent

Women's race
- Winner: Cambridge
- Margin of victory: 7 lengths
- Overall record (Cambridge–Oxford): 48–30
- Umpire: Richard Phelps

Reserves' races
- Men's winners: Goldie
- Women's winners: Osiris

The Boat Race 2024 was a series of side-by-side rowing races in London which took place on 30 March 2024.

Held annually, The Boat Race is contested between crews from the universities of Oxford and Cambridge, usually along a 4.2-mile (6.8 km) tidal stretch of the River Thames, known as the Tideway, in south-west London. This was the 78th women's race and the 169th men's race. Cambridge led the longstanding rivalry 86–81 and 47–30 in the men's and women's races, respectively.

== Background ==
The Championship Course along which the races were conducted (historic names used)

The Boat Race is an annual side-by-side rowing competition between the University of Oxford (sometimes referred to as the "Dark Blues") and the University of Cambridge (sometimes referred to as the "Light Blues"). First held in 1829, the race usually takes place on the 4.2-mile (6.8 km) Championship Course, between Putney and Mortlake on the River Thames in south-west London. The rivalry is a major point of honour between the two universities; the race is followed throughout the United Kingdom and broadcast worldwide.

== Coaches ==
Sean Bowden was the chief coach for OUBC, having been responsible for the men's crew since 1997, winning 13 from the previous 20 races. A former Great Britain Olympic coach, he led the Light Blues in the 1993 and 1994 Boat Races. Bowden's assistant coach was Brendan Gliddon, a South African who formerly coached under-23 and Fédération Internationale du Sport Universitaire (FISU) teams for both South Africa and Great Britain. The OUWBC chief coach was Allan French, formerly of Oxford Brookes University Boat Club. He was assisted by James Powell.

The Cambridge men's crew coaching team was led by their chief coach, Rob Baker, who had previously coached Cambridge's women to victories in both the 2017 and 2018 races. Cambridge women's chief coach was Patrick Ryan who joined as CUBC's women's assistant coach in 2013. CUBC's assistant coaches included Bill Lucas, Matilda Horn and Nick Acock, with Henry Fieldman as the coxing coach and Donald Legget and Marko Banovic performing supporting roles.

== Crews ==
The crews for both men's and women's boats were announced on 13th March 2024, at Battersea Power Station, London.

=== Women ===
Women's crews
Seat	Oxford			Cambridge		
Seat	Name	Nationality	College	Name	Nationality	College
Bow	Sarah Marshall	British	Jesus	Gemma King	British	St. John's
2	Ella Stadler (P)	British/American	Exeter	Jo Matthews	British	St. John's
3	Tessa Haining	British/American	Balliol	Clare Hole	British	St. Catharine's
4	Claire Aitken	British	Oriel	Jenna Armstrong (P)	American	Jesus
5	Julia Lindsay	Canadian	St. Cross	Carina Graf	German	Emmanuel
6	Annie Sharp	British	St. Antony's	Carys Earl	British/Swiss	Gonville and Caius
7	Lucy Edmunds	British	Pembroke	Iris Powell	British	Churchill
Stroke	Annie Anezakis	Australian	Pembroke	Megan Lee	American	Lucy Cavendish
Cox	Joe Gellett	British	St Peter's	Hannah Murphy	American	Girton
(P) – Boat club president

=== Men ===
Men's crews
Seat	Oxford			Cambridge		
Seat	Name	Nationality	College	Name	Nationality	College
Bow	Saxon Stacey	British	St. John's	Seb Benzecry (P)	British	Jesus
2	Harry Glenister	British	Keble	Noam Mouelle	French	Hughes Hall
3	Jelmer Bennema	Dutch	Exeter	Thomas Marsh	British/American	St. John's
4	James Doran	British	Oriel	Augustus John	British/Australian	Wolfson
5	Elias Kun	German	Green Templeton	Kenneth Coplan	American	Hughes Hall
6	Fred Roper	Australian	Somerville	Thomas Lynch	Canadian/Irish	Hughes Hall
7	Lenny Jenkins	British/New Zealand	Mansfield	Luca Ferraro	British	King's
Stroke	Elliott Kemp	British	Oriel	Matthew Edge	British	St Catharine's
Cox	Will Denegri	British	Oriel	Ed Bracey	British	Wolfson
(P) – Boat club president: Louis Corrigan was the President of OUBC

== Details ==
The women's race was umpired by Richard Phelps and the men's by Matthew Pinsent.

Cambridge retained their title as winners of the Women's Boat Race for the seventh consecutive year, 7 lengths ahead of rivals Oxford. This took the overall record in the women's race to 48–30 to Cambridge. Cambridge beat the Oxford men by 3 1/2 lengths in a time of 18m 56s in a tense encounter which featured the collapse of the Cambridge stroke Matt Edge in the closing stages of the race. As a result of Cambridge's victory the head-to-head record after the race stood at 87–81 in Cambridge's favour. Oxford women's boat Osiris won the women's reserves race. Cambridge's Goldie won the men's reserves race. Cambridge's men and women secured victory in The Lightweight Boat Races.

The race was broadcast internationally on television. Fox News, CNN, The New York Times, CBS and other international media organisations ran stories about the poor water quality in the Thames, specifically citing excrement in the water during the race. Thames Water responded saying improving river health was a "key focus" for the company, which recently completed the Thames Tideway Tunnel 'super sewer' to stop sewage overflows and improve water quality in the Thames.
