= Green Templeton College, Oxford =

College of the University of Oxford

Green Templeton College
- University of Oxford
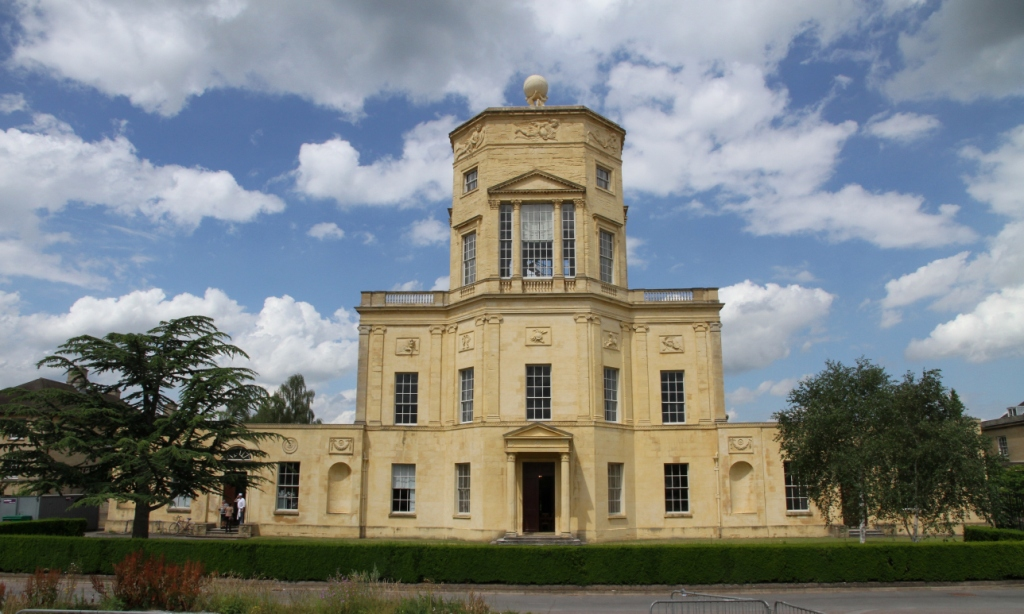
- The Radcliffe Observatory, part of Green Templeton College

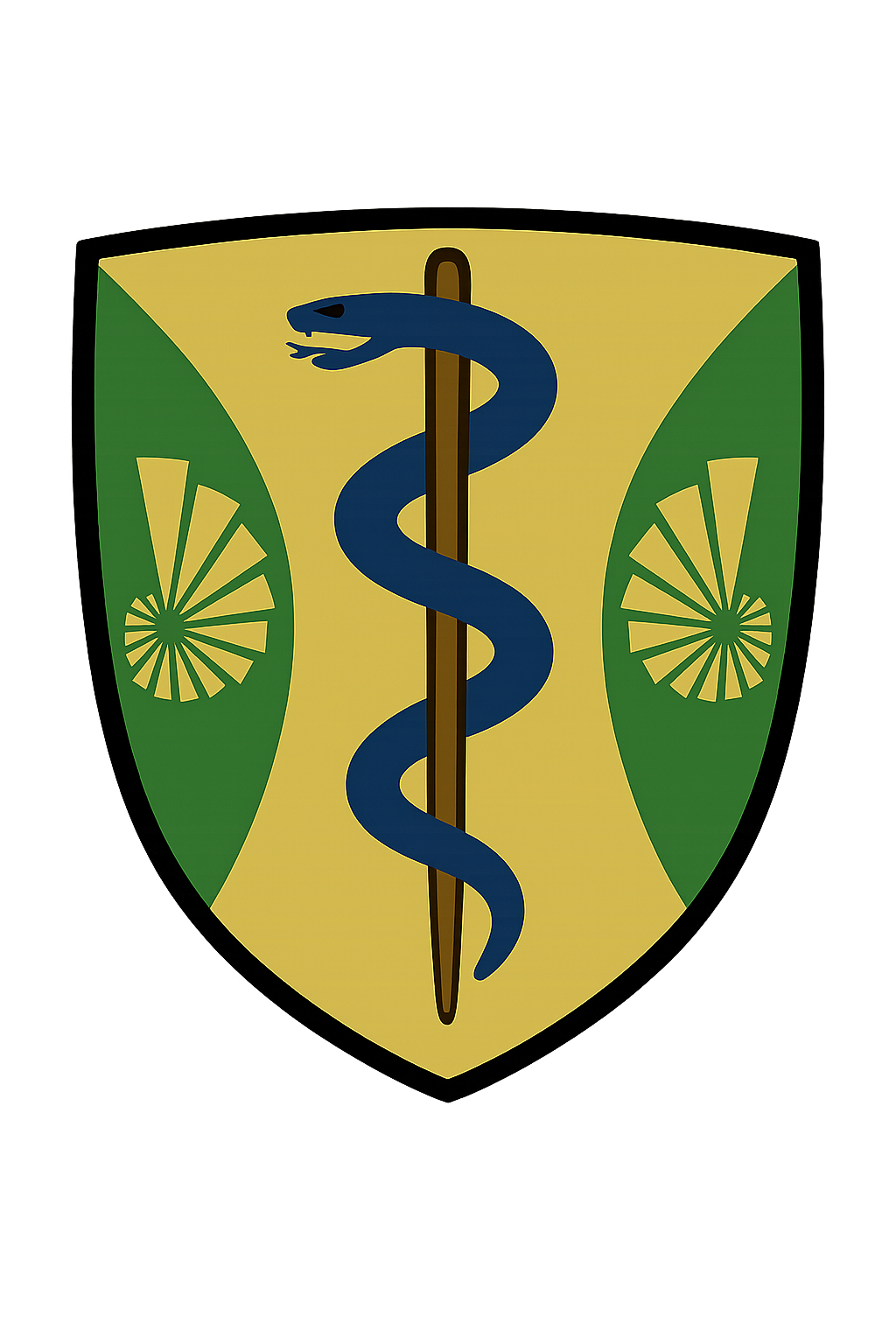
- Arms: Or between two Flaunches Vert on each a Nautilus Shell the aperture outwards Or a Rod of Aesculapius Sable the Serpent Azure
- Location: Woodstock Road, Oxford
- Coordinates: 51.761223°N 1.262866°W
- Latin name: Collegium Green Templeton
- Established: 2008; 18 years ago
- Named for: Cecil Howard Green and Sir John Templeton
- Sister college: St Edmund's College, Cambridge
- Principal: Sir Michael Dixon
- Undergraduates: 90 (Dec. 2024)
- Postgraduates: 525 (Dec. 2024)
- Endowment: £1.4 million (2024)
- Website: www.gtc.ox.ac.uk
- Boat club: Green Templeton Boat Club

Map
- Location within Oxford city centre

Green Templeton College (GTC) is a constituent college of the University of Oxford in the United Kingdom. The college is located on the former Green College site on Woodstock Road next to the Radcliffe Observatory Quarter in North Oxford and is centred on the architecturally important Radcliffe Observatory, an 18th-century building, modelled on the ancient Tower of the Winds in Athens. The Radcliffe Observatory, completed in 1773, was among the earliest purpose-built observatories in Britain and remains a prominent example of Georgian scientific architecture. It is the university's second newest graduate college, after Reuben College, having been founded by the historic merger of Green College and Templeton College in 2008.

The college has a distinctive academic profile, specialising in subjects relating to human welfare and social, economic, and environmental well-being, including medical and health sciences, management and business, and most social sciences. The college is a registered charity. As of 31 July 2024, the College reported total assets of about £103.5 million and total funds of £101.8 million, including an endowment of approximately £1.39 million.

Green Templeton's sister college at the University of Cambridge is St Edmund's College.

== History ==
Green Templeton College was established in 2008 through the merger of Green College (founded 1979) and Templeton College (founded 1965), creating Oxford’s newest graduate college.

The merger between Green College and Templeton College was the first of its kind in the university's modern history. It was announced formally in July 2007 following its approval by the University Council and the Governing Bodies of both colleges. Green Templeton College has always accepted both female and male students, as did both of its predecessors.

Although both Green College and Templeton College were founded in the late twentieth century, they represented different academic traditions within the university: Green College specialised in medicine and the social sciences, while Templeton College focused on management and business leadership.

=== Green College ===
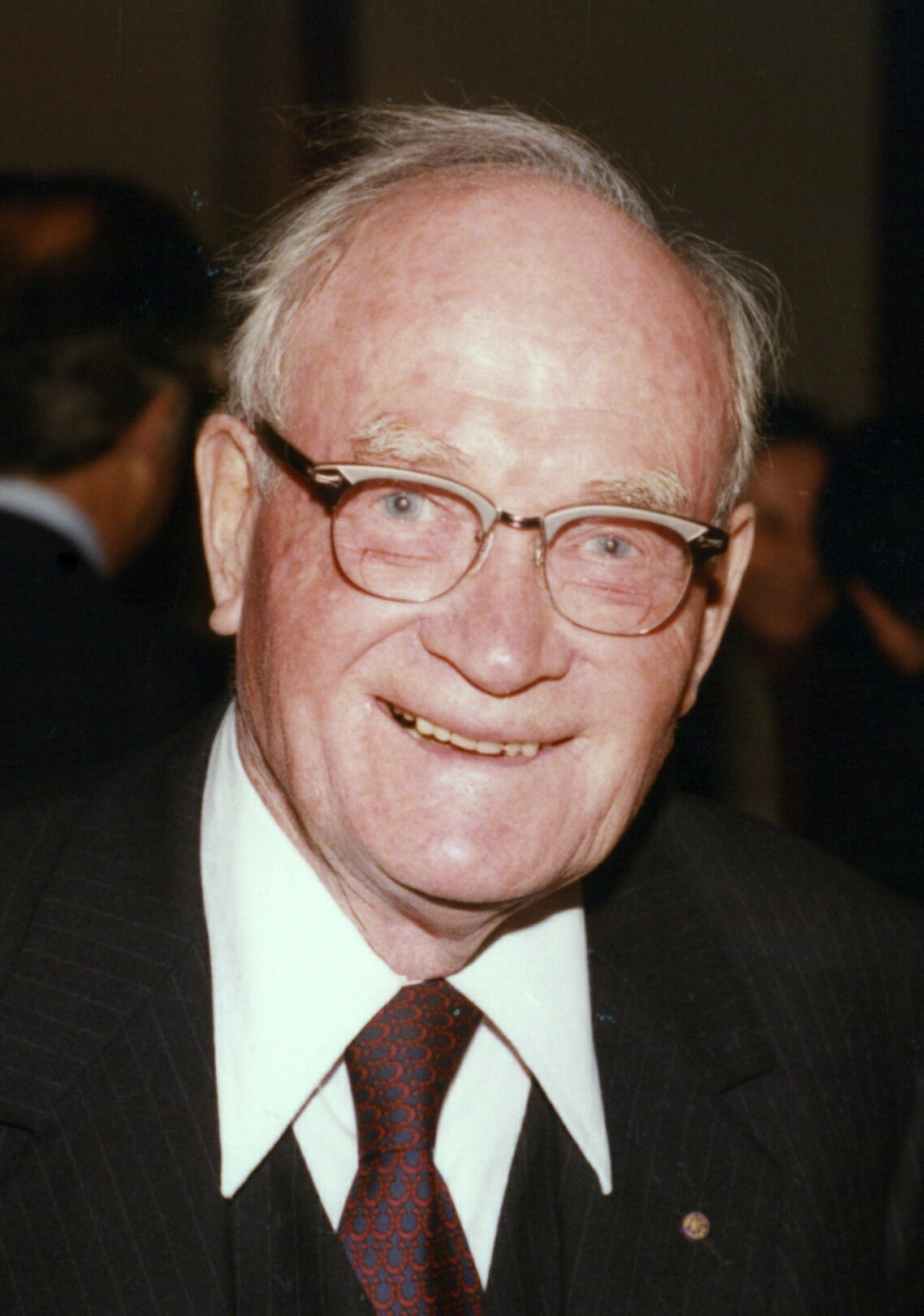
Cecil H. Green (mid-1980s), founder of Texas Instruments and principal benefactor of Green College.

Green College was founded in 1979 to bring together graduate students of medicine and related disciplines, and especially to encourage academic programmes in industry. It was named after its main benefactors: Cecil H. Green, founder of Texas Instruments, and his wife, Ida Green. It was one of three colleges established through Green’s financial contributions, the others being Green College, University of British Columbia and The University of Texas at Dallas.

Of its student population, around 30 % studied in the field of medicine, around 20 % were engaged in postgraduate medical research, and other focuses included social work, environmental change and education studies. Sir Richard Doll, the first Warden of Green College, was one of the most influential medical researchers of the twentieth century. His pioneering epidemiological studies established the causal link between smoking and lung cancer in 1950, a discovery that transformed public health policy. Reflecting this legacy, Green Templeton College maintains a smoke-free policy across its main site and all annexes.

A proposal to establish the college was first submitted to the University Council in 1975 by the Board of the Faculty of Clinical Medicine. After approval in 1977, the University allocated the Radcliffe Observatory and its surrounding buildings for the new graduate college’s use. Restoration and construction work were funded through the benefaction of Cecil and Ida Green, and the college opened formally on 1 September 1979.

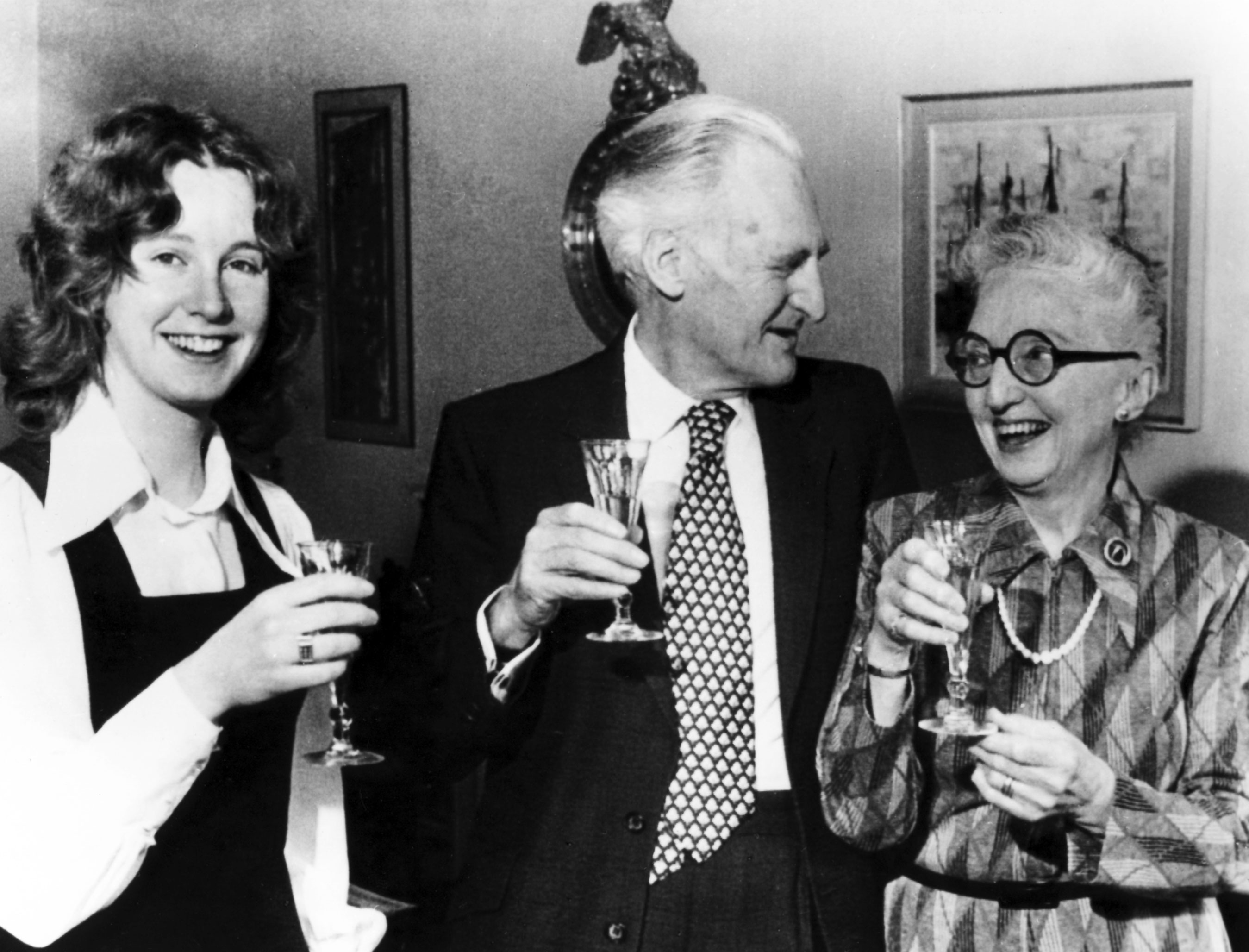
Sir Richard Doll (centre), first Warden of Green College (1979–1983)

Green College was designed to foster collaboration between medicine, the social sciences, and industry, bringing together graduates working on issues related to human health and well-being. Its early facilities included the restored Radcliffe Observatory, which housed the dining and common rooms, the E. P. Abraham Lecture Room, and residential accommodation surrounding the Lankester and McAlpine quadrangles.

In the same year, the college purchased William Osler House in the grounds of the John Radcliffe Hospital for use by the Osler House Club, the social and sporting organisation for clinical medical students. An extension opened in early 1986, and Green College students automatically became members, participating in Osler House’s wide range of sporting and social activities, including rugby, cricket, hockey, rowing and badminton.

=== Templeton College ===
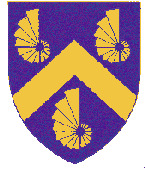
Coat of arms of the former Templeton College, Oxford

Templeton College was founded in 1965 as the Oxford Centre for Management Studies (OCMS) under the chairmanship of Sir Norman Chester, Warden of Nuffield College, supported by Brasenose Bursar Norman Leyland and an initial benefaction from Clifford Barclay.

In 1983, Sir John Templeton made a major endowment to the Centre—one of the largest gifts to a British educational institution at the time—and it was renamed Templeton College in his honour. The College began admitting its own graduate students in 1984 and was granted a Royal Charter in 1995, becoming a full graduate college of the University.

The College’s main site, Egrove Park in Kennington village near Oxford, was opened in 1969. Designed by architect Richard Burton of Ahrends Burton and Koralek, the Grade II-listed modernist building combined openness and symmetry with a traditional quadrangle layout. Its 37-acre grounds were landscaped by arboriculturalist Alan Mitchell and include the William Polk Carey Meadows, a designated District Wildlife Site, and the Richard Marshall Woodland Walk, commemorating a Templeton Associate Fellow.

Templeton developed as Oxford's specialist graduate college in management studies and executive education, complementing the later Saïd Business School. Under the direction of Uwe Kitzinger, the College built connections between academia, business, and government, hosting forums and discussion groups including the Emerging Markets Forum and Oxford Futures Forum. Research programmes included collaborations with the European Patent Office, Shell International, and the European Commission on topics ranging from strategic renewal to business logistics.

The College engaged with the public sector through workshops on change management and public-sector reform, and hosted pre-office training for the Labour Shadow Cabinet in 1996.

The College’s coat of arms features a stylised nautilus shell, introduced under Uwe Kitzinger’s direction in 1984 to symbolise organic intellectual growth and independent development. The shell’s spiral form also represents the “horn of plenty,” reflecting Sir John Templeton’s view of management as a means of fostering prosperity and human potential.

== Coat of arms ==
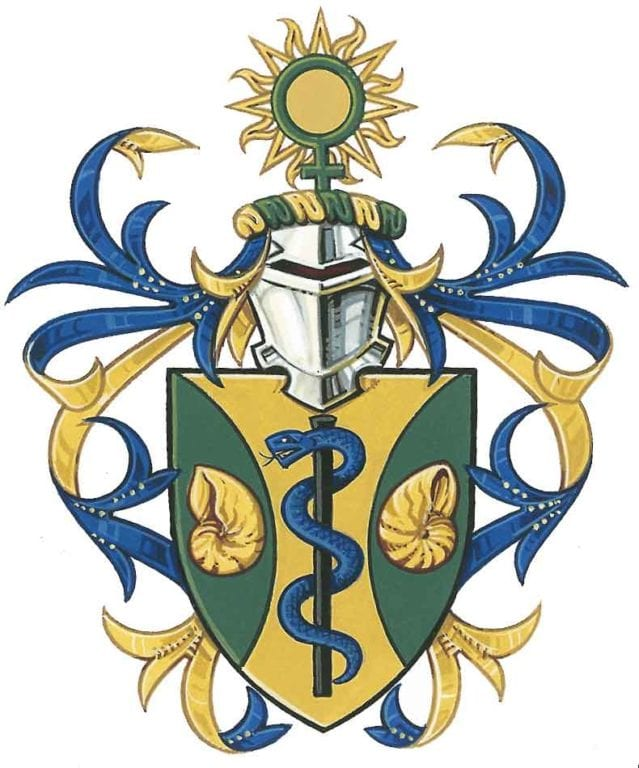
The coat of arms of Green Templeton College, Oxford, designed by the College of Arms in 2007 following the merger of Green College and Templeton College.

Green Templeton College's armorial bearings combine elements from the original coats of arms of both Green College and Templeton College, capturing the spirit of the history and character of each.

Its shield comprises two primary symbols: the rod of Aesculapius and the Nautilus shell. The former was the principal charge of Green College's coat of arms. (In Greek mythology, Aesculapius, the son of Apollo, was a medical practitioner. The serpent coiled around his staff symbolises the healing arts.) The Nautilus shell was chosen by Sir John Templeton, as symbolising evolution and renewal, and was adopted by Templeton College in 1984.

Green Templeton College's crest depicts a heraldic representation of the Sun behind the astronomical device for Venus (♀), acknowledging the historic transit of Venus across the Sun in 1761, which astronomical event prompted the foundation of the Radcliffe Observatory. The crest is blazoned:

(On a Helm with a Wreath Or and Vert) In front of a Sun in splendour the rays voided Or the Astrological Symbol for Venus Vert.

== Buildings and grounds ==
=== The Radcliffe Observatory ===
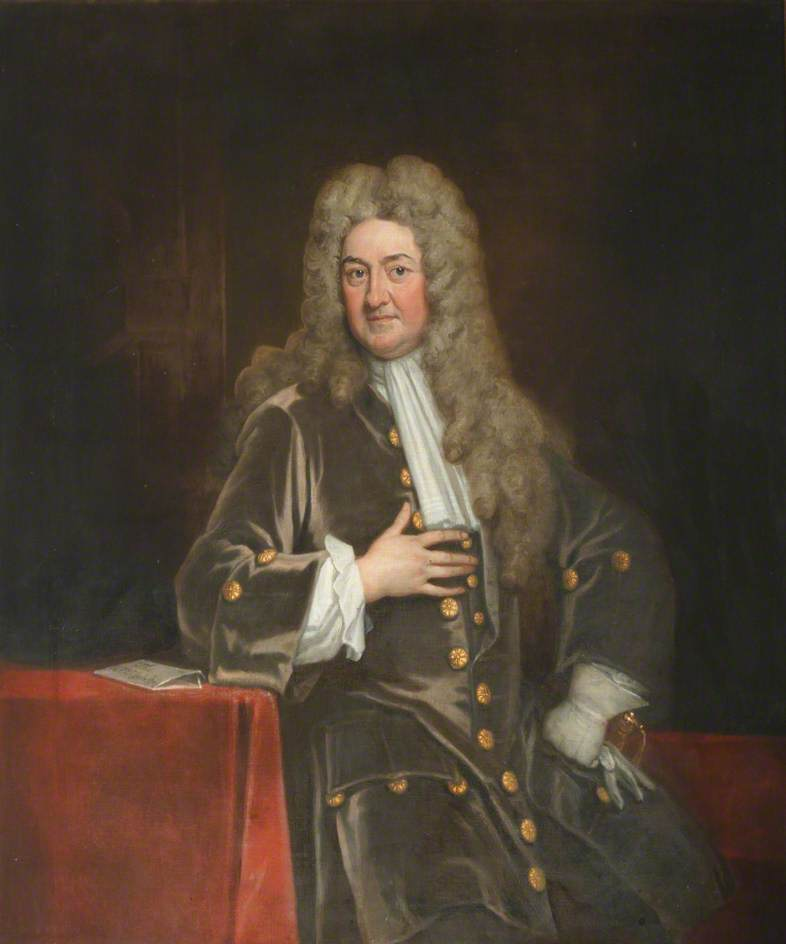
Dr John Radcliffe (1650–1714), the physician and benefactor whose estate funded the Radcliffe buildings in Oxford.

The college is located on the three-acre (1.2 ha) site on Woodstock Road in North Oxford that previously housed Green College. It is centred on the architecturally important Radcliffe Observatory, an 18th-century, Grade I listed building, modelled on the ancient Tower of the Winds in Athens.

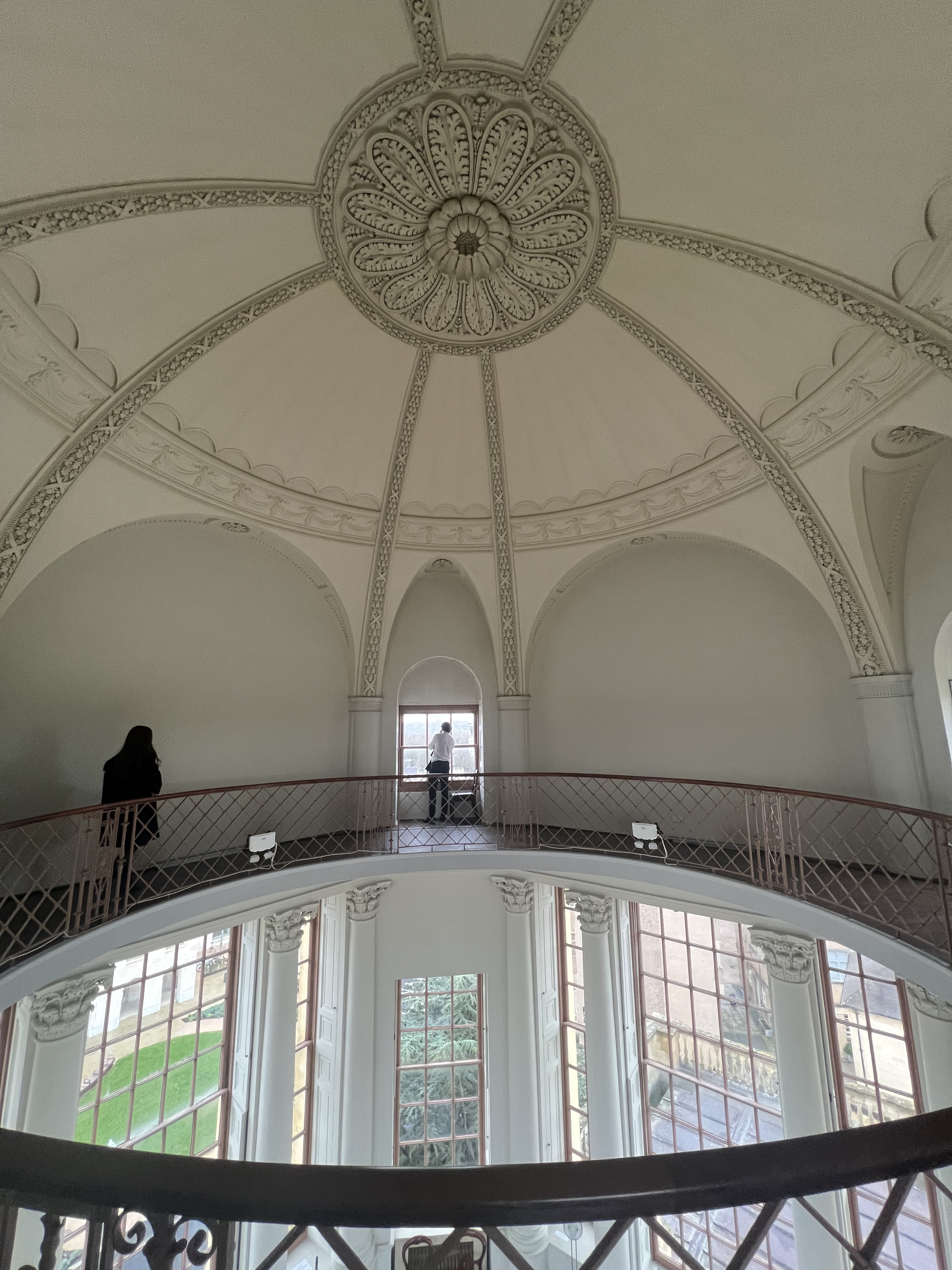
Inside the Radcliffe Observatory tower at Green Templeton College, Oxford.

The observatory was built at the suggestion of Thomas Hornsby, the Savilian Professor of Astronomy at the university, after he had used his room in the Bodleian Tower to observe the transit of Venus across the Sun's disc in 1769. The transit was a notable event which helped to produce greatly improved measurements for nautical navigation. The observatory was built with funds from the trust of John Radcliffe, whose considerable estate had already financed a new quadrangle for his old college (University College, Oxford) as well as the Radcliffe Library (now the Radcliffe Camera) and the Radcliffe Infirmary. Building began in 1772 to plans by the architect Henry Keene, but only Observer's House (see below) is his design. Upon Keene's death in 1776, the observatory was completed to a different design by James Wyatt. Wyatt based his design on an illustration of the Tower of the Winds in Athens that had appeared in Stuart and Revett's Antiquities of Athens, published in 1762.

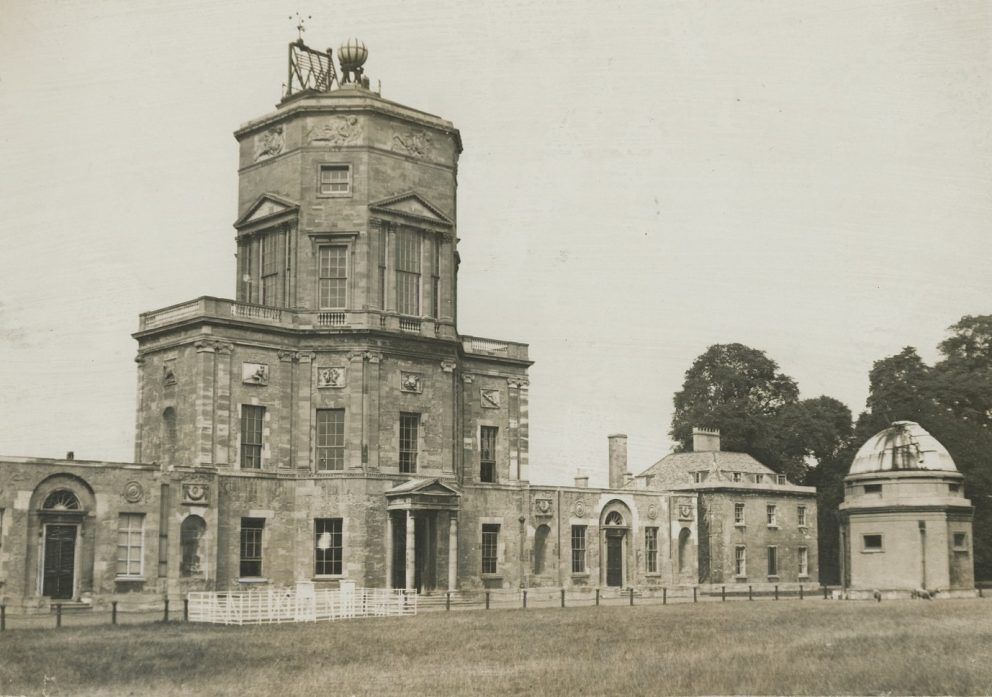
Radcliffe Observatory Building - 1929

Atop the observatory rests the Tower of Winds. Beneath the tower are three levels, with rooms on each level. Since 2008 the Observatory has served as the college’s main building: the ground floor functions as the Dining Hall, the first floor as the Graduate Common Room, and the upper floors house seminar and administration rooms including the Principal’s office. The observatory was a functioning observatory from 1773 until its owners, the Radcliffe Trustees, sold it in 1934 to Lord Nuffield, who then presented it to the Radcliffe Hospital. In 1936, Lord Nuffield established the Nuffield Institute for Medical Research there. In 1979, the Nuffield Institute relocated to the John Radcliffe Hospital and the observatory was taken over by Green College.

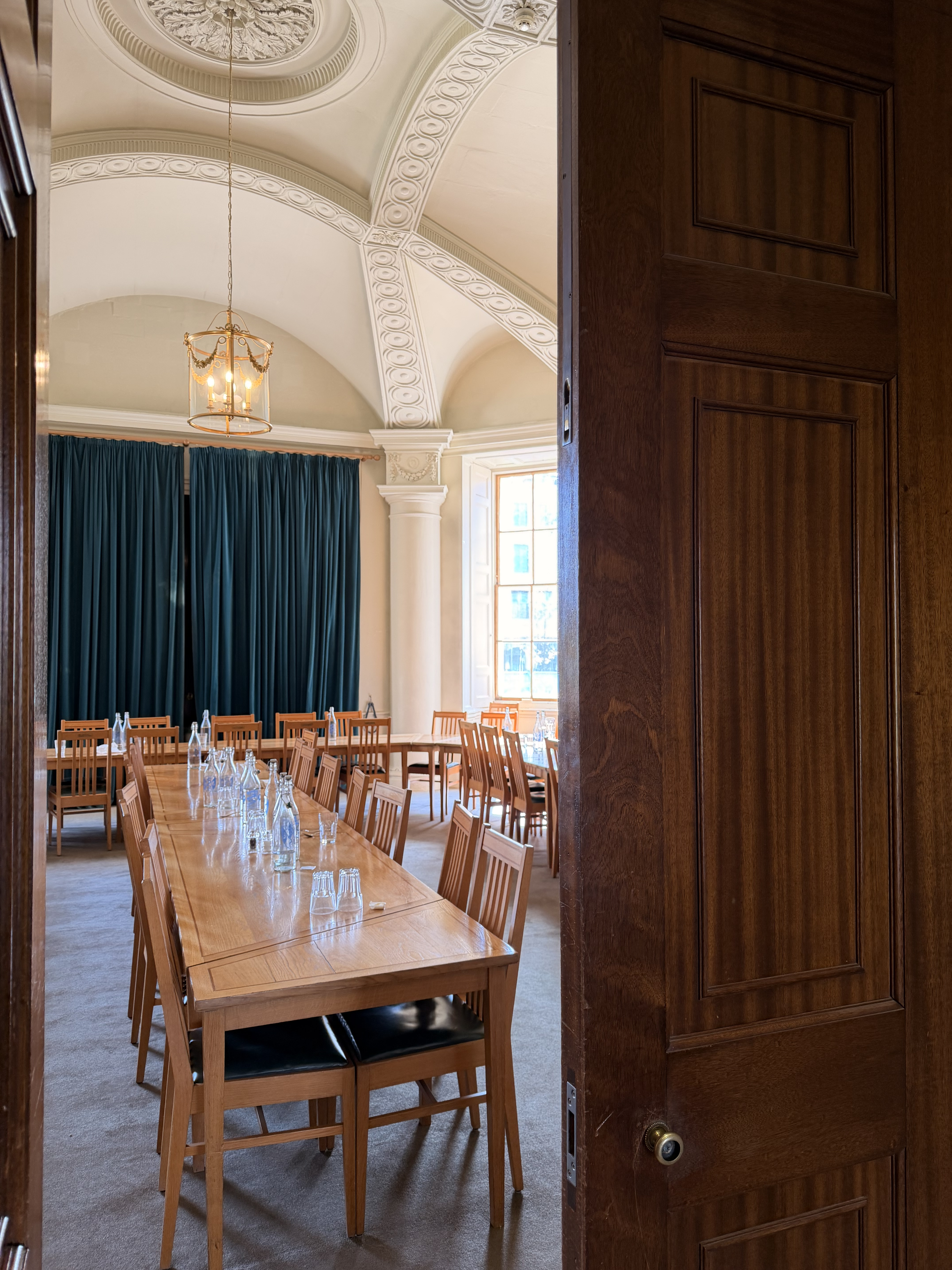
The dining hall of Green Templeton College after lunch service.

==== Dining ====
The Radcliffe Observatory Dining Hall, on the ground floor of the Observatory, provides dining for college members and guests. The college offers a full catering service ranging from casual lunches to formal dinners and can host private and college events in the dining rooms. Catering is managed in-house and the facilities are also available for external venue hire.

==== Gardens ====
The Observatory gardens contain mature trees and historic plantings and serve as a venue for college events throughout the year. The layout and planting reflect the site’s scientific and medical associations: there are formal borders and specimen trees, an area of planting that commemorates the Observatory’s astronomical history, and a medicinal/herb plot that acknowledges the site’s long links with medicine and medical teaching. The gardens are maintained by the college horticultural team and are used for formal and informal events, including receptions and college gatherings.

==== Music Rotunda ====
The college’s Music Rotunda occupies the footprint of the Observatory’s original kitchen block and serves as a small circular performance and rehearsal venue. The space hosts chamber concerts, recitals and practice sessions for students and fellows, complementing the college’s formal music programme.

==== Meteorological station ====
The college operates a meteorological station continuing weather records begun at the Observatory in the eighteenth century and used for education and research.

==== Marlborough Telescope ====
Installed in 2023, the Marlborough Telescope commemorates the Observatory’s astronomical origins and is used for student and public observation events.

==== John Radcliffe statue ====
A statue of John Radcliffe stands in the Observatory gardens to acknowledge the site’s medical heritage.

==== Sundial ====
A sundial by sculptor Martin Jennings, installed in 1995 to mark the bicentenary of the Radcliffe Observatory, incorporates an analemma and month symbols illustrating the sun’s apparent motion. The dial commemorates both the Observatory’s astronomical heritage and the college’s continuing scientific focus.

=== 13 Norham Gardens ===
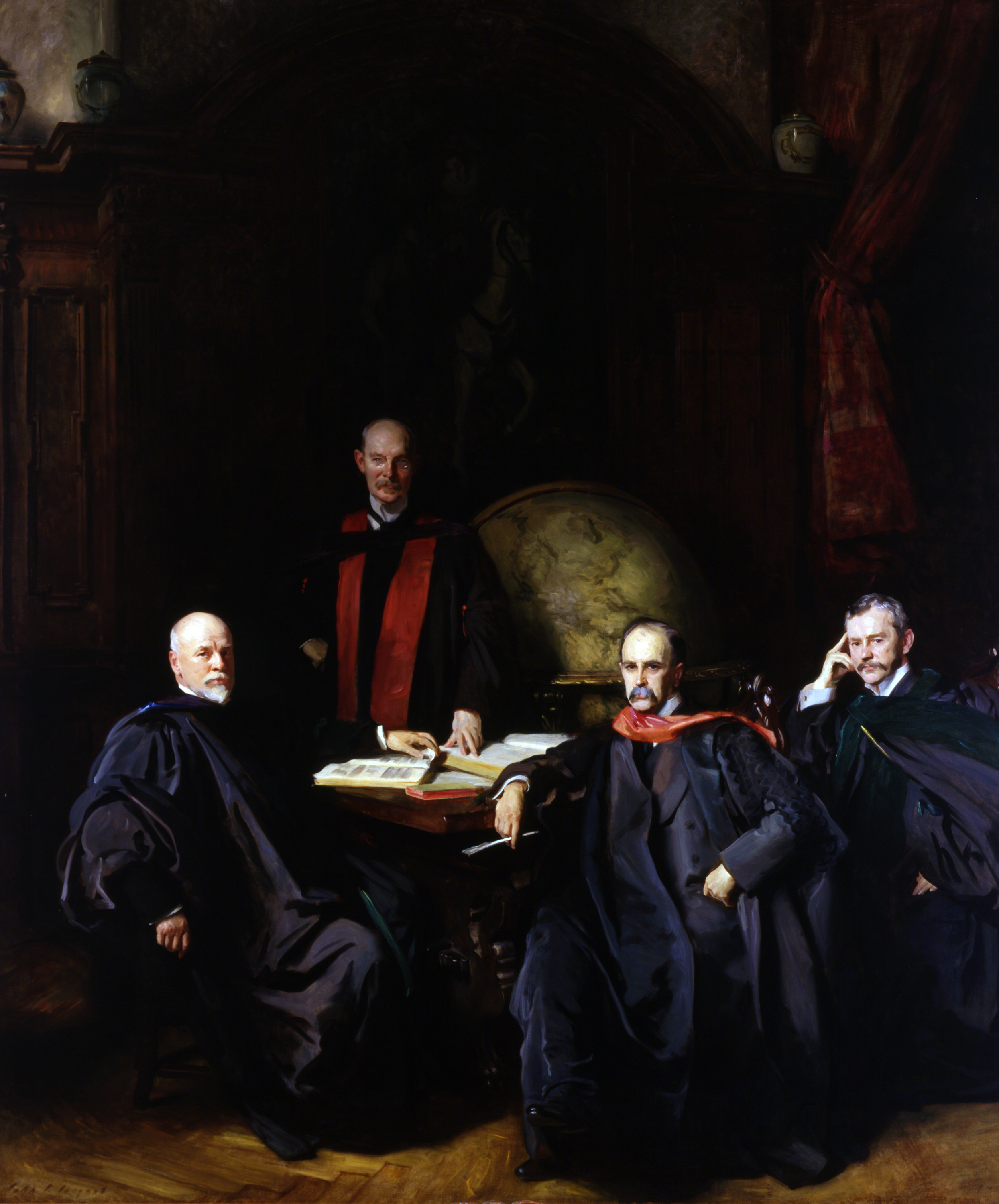
The Four Doctors (1906), depicting Sir William Osler (seated second from left) with his colleagues Howard Atwood Kelly, William Stewart Halsted and William Welch, the founding professors of Johns Hopkins Hospital.

The building at 13 Norham Gardens is a Grade II listed Victorian villa dating from 1869, originally built for Thomas Dallin and altered in 1906–07 for Sir William Osler, Regius Professor of Medicine at Oxford. Regarded as one of the “Big Four” founding professors of Johns Hopkins Hospital, Osler was among the most influential figures in the development of modern clinical medicine. During Osler’s tenure the house became known as “The Open Arms” for its hospitality to medical students and visiting scholars.

After Osler the house was occupied by subsequent Regius Professors of Medicine, including Sir George Pickering and Sir Richard Doll, before its acquisition by Green College. It now houses the Osler-McGovern Centre and the Reuters Institute for the Study of Journalism, providing space for lectures, conferences and visiting fellows.

=== Housing ===
Green Templeton College has housing on the main site and in various annexes. On-site housing includes the Doll Building (built 1981) with 30 student rooms, Walton Building with 3 student rooms, Observer’s House with 13 student rooms and New Block with 4 student rooms. Furthermore, the college has additional student rooms in Lord Napier House (Observatory Street), 2- and 3-bedroomed terraced houses in Observatory Street, various student rooms on St Margaret’s Road, and 1- and 2-bedroom flats in Rewley Abbey Court and Norham Gardens.

=== Libraries ===
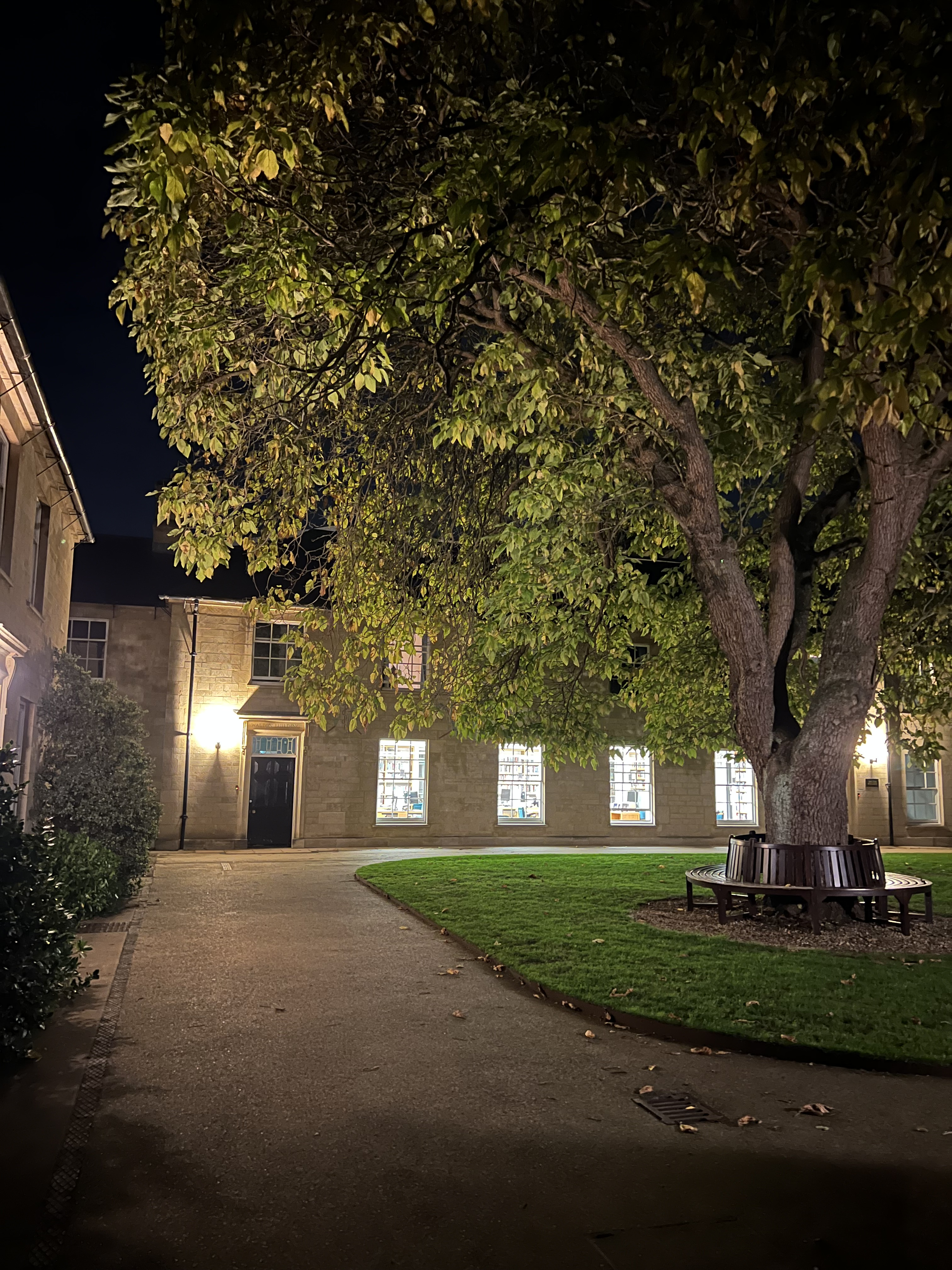
The Green Templeton College library building at night. The college’s libraries are open to members 24 hours a day.

There are two 24-hour-access libraries on-campus: a management library (Management Studies Library) and a medical/social science library (Medical Library). The Management Studies Library is adjacent to the Observer's House, and the Medical Library is adjacent to the Radcliffe Observatory.

=== Facilities ===
Green Templeton also provides laundry facilities, a lecture theatre (the Abraham Lecture Theatre), a seminar/presentation room (the Barclay Room), and a computing room with 6 Windows computers. Since August 2014, Green Templeton has an on-site 171 square meter gym with rowing machines, spinning bikes, treadmills and weights located between the main site and Observatory street.

=== Collections ===
Green Templeton College holds a small but notable art collection displayed across the Radcliffe Observatory site, including portraits, sculptures, and contemporary works associated with medicine, management, and the college’s benefactors. The collection spans from the seventeenth century to the present day and features works by artists such as John I Hoskins, Martin Jennings, Tess Barnes, and David Hugo.

=== Future developments ===
In 2022 Oxford City Council approved major redevelopment works at Green Templeton College, recorded under planning application 22/00409/FUL. The scheme includes three new accommodation buildings providing 51 student rooms, a new porters’ lodge and gatehouse, a replacement dining hall, and a single-storey café and study space. It also permanently retains and refurbishes the gym on Observatory Street. The redevelopment relocates catering facilities from the Grade I-listed Radcliffe Observatory to new purpose-built spaces, enabling restoration of the Observatory’s interiors. The project achieves a 17 percent on-site biodiversity net gain and meets the sustainability standards of the Oxford Local Plan.

==== Radcliffe Observatory conservation project ====
Green Templeton College has launched a multi-phase programme to conserve and renew the Observatory. Phase 1, supported by the Stephen A. Schwarzman Foundation, restores the south façade and creates a new east entrance, with future phases planned for roof and window conservation, sustainability improvements and accessibility upgrades. Principal Sir Michael Dixon described the initiative as “a reflection of what higher education can be at its best: rooted in place, outward-looking and open to all.”

== Student life ==
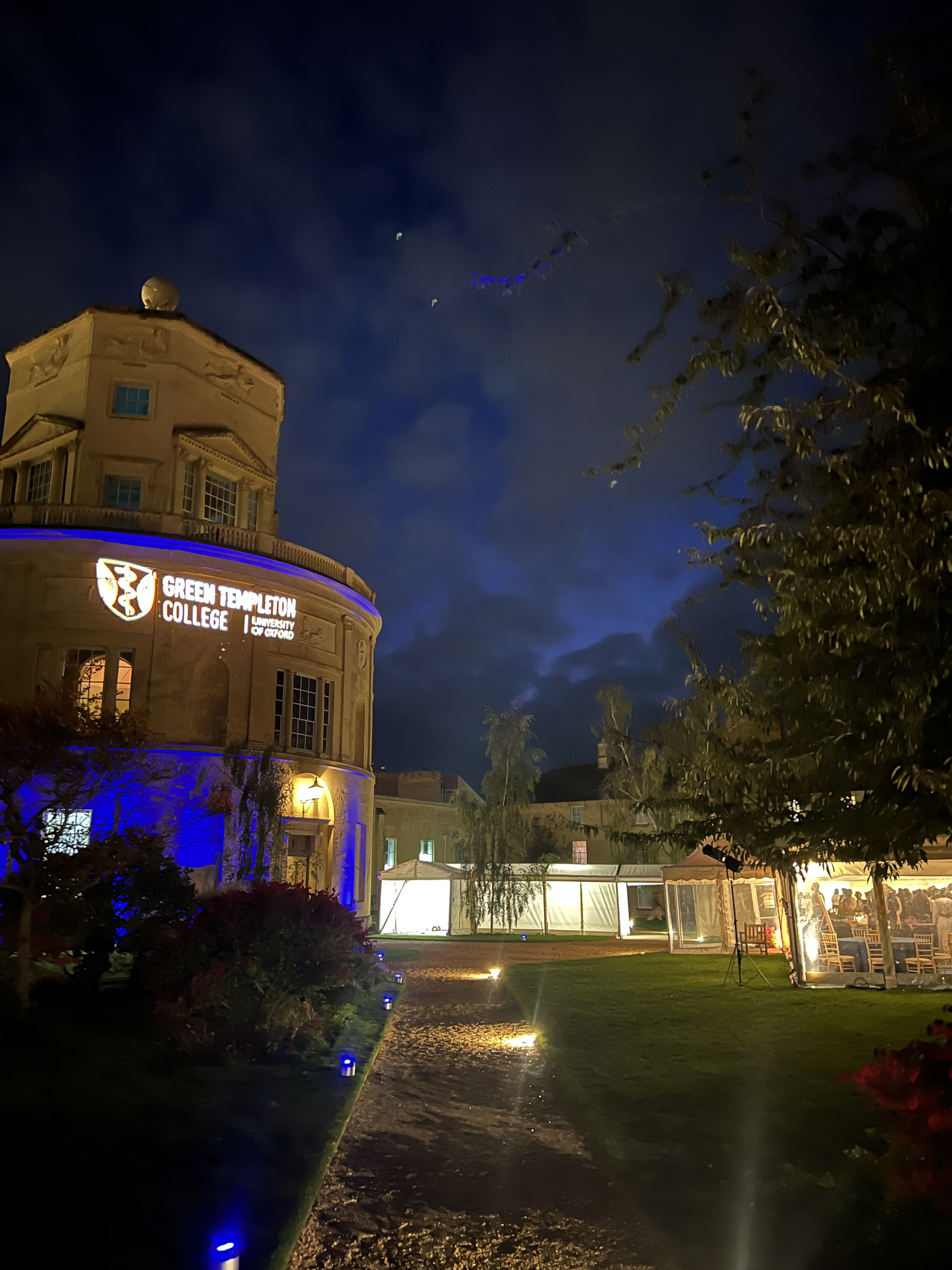
Green Templeton College illuminated at night during Freshers’ Week, with marquee tents set up for student welcome events.

As a graduate college, it has a single common room, known as the Graduate Common Room ("GCR") – equivalent to the Middle Common Room ("MCR") in other colleges – to encourage interaction between students and fellows.

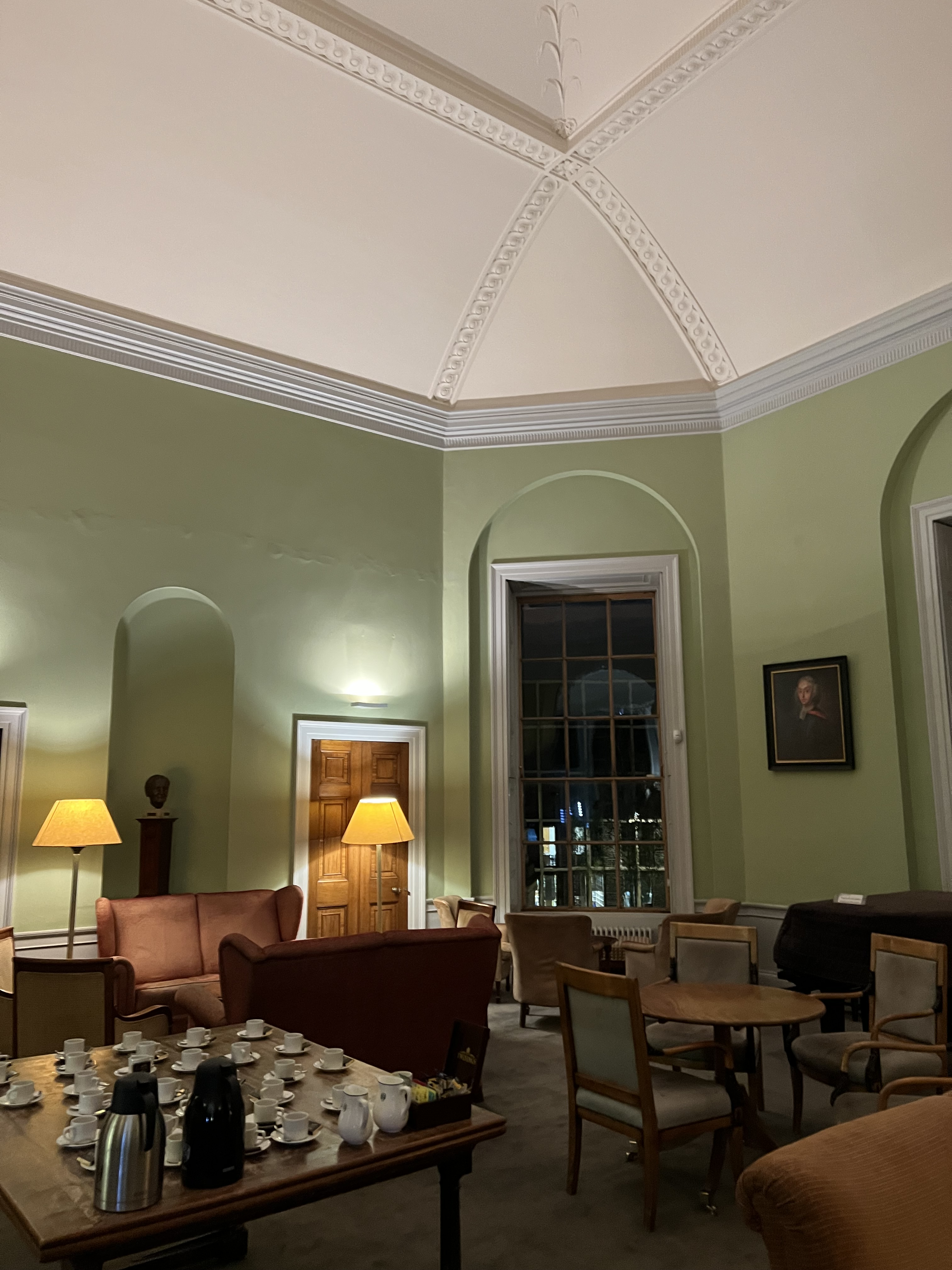
The Graduate Common Room (GCR) at Green Templeton College — post-formal coffee service.

Green Templeton offers a wide variety of activities to its students. The various Green Templeton College clubs and societies include the Green Templeton Boat Club, the Book Club, Choir, Golf Society, LGBT Society, Medical Anthropology Society, Richard Doll Society, and Music Society. College events include the annual college Garden Party, the Summer Ball, the Human Welfare Conference, "Welfare and Wine", formals, and themed "bops" (discos or college parties), held throughout the year. Lecture series are routinely held for those interested, including the Green Templeton Lectures and those held by the Reuter's Institute.

The college is also active in various sports, especially rowing. Other sports at Green Templeton College include badminton, basketball, cricket, croquet, football, golf, netball, rugby, running, squash and tennis. The college also has on-site tennis and squash courts. In addition to this, all students of the college are entitled to free membership at the Iffley Road Sports Centre.

Beyond its student-run Music Society, the college supports a formal music programme with a choir, regular recitals and performances open to all members, reflecting its inclusive graduate community and interdisciplinary ethos.

The college bar, known as the Stables Bar, is open for drinks in the evenings, and serves as a meeting place during the day.

Green Templeton is actively involved in charity work, supporting a local and an overseas charity every year. Both the Graduate Common Room and the College Charity Committee organise numerous events throughout the year, both at Green Templeton College and in Oxford.

Green Templeton College's strong ties with the clinical medicine community are fostered through its affiliation with Osler House. Osler House is Oxford University's club for medical students and is open to students and fellows involved in research in a range of topics related to human health and welfare. The ambience of Osler House is focused around a games room which has pool and table football facilities.

The college publishes a newsletter every term, called In Transit, as well as an annual Green Templeton College alumni magazine, called The GTC Magazine (formerly, albeit for Templeton College only, Templeton Views), and the college Graduate Common Room circulates a weekly electronic newsletter.

=== Rowing ===
The Green Templeton Boat Club was founded in 2008 following the merger of Green and Templeton Colleges. Despite being one of Oxford’s newest college boat clubs, it has achieved strong results in intercollegiate rowing. The club races in the Torpids and Summer Eights competitions each year, and its crews have rapidly advanced through the divisions, recording multiple bumps in both the men’s and women’s events. The club trains from the Longbridges Boathouse on the River Isis, which is co-owned and shared with Hertford College, St Hilda’s College, St Catherine’s College and Mansfield College, and maintains a growing fleet. Rowing at Green Templeton is open to all members, with novice and experienced squads participating throughout the year.

== People associated with Green Templeton College ==
=== Principals ===
- Colin Bundy, First Principal of Green Templeton College
- Sir Michael Dixon, Principal since 2020; previously Director of the Natural History Museum (2004–2021).
- Sir Richard Doll, epidemiologist, first Warden of Green College
- Michael Earl, Pro-Vice Chancellor of the University of Oxford
- Sir Crispin Tickell, diplomat and environmentalist, third Warden of Green College
- Michael von Clemm, American businessman, restaurateur, anthropologist, former President of Templeton College
- Lord Walton of Detchant, politician (life peer), second Warden of Green College

=== Fellows ===
- Kunal Basu, Indian-born British fiction author
- Dame Valerie Beral, Australian-born British epidemiologist
- Rory Collins, epidemiologist
- E. David Cook, theologian
- Sarah Darby, epidemiologist
- Sir Vernon Ellis, Barclay Fellow (2002–06) and Chair of the British Council
- Peter Friend, surgeon, Professor of Transplantation and Director of the Oxford Transplant Centre
- Anna Gloyn, geneticist & endocrinologist (2004-2022)
- Shaukat Aziz, former Prime Minister of Pakistan
- Sanjaya Lall, World Bank economist, Professor of Economics and Fellow of Green College
- John Lennox, Irish mathematician
- Chris Liddell, businessman and former White House Deputy Chief of Staff
- Sir Richard Peto, epidemiologist
- Stein Ringen, Norwegian sociologist and political scientist
- Rosemary Stewart, business theorist
- Steve Woolgar, sociologist
- Neil Mortensen, professor of colorectal surgery

=== Notable alumni ===
- Ron Emerson — Founding Chairman of the British Business Bank.
- Derrick Gosselin — Belgian/Flemish engineer and economist.
- Nancy Hubbard — American professor of business; former Associate Fellow of Templeton College.
- Derek Kilmer — American politician serving as the U.S. representative for Washington's 6th congressional district since 2013.
- Beverly Leon — Former midfielder of Sunderland A.F.C. Ladies and CEO of Local Civics.
- Mahiben Maruthappu — British physician, entrepreneur and health policy adviser; founder and CEO of Cera.
- Notis Mitarachi — Greek politician; Minister of Migration & Asylum (2020) of the Hellenic Republic; MP of the Hellenic Parliament; former President of the Council of the European Union (Foreign Affairs – Trade) during the Hellenic Presidency; former Deputy Minister for Economic Development & Competitiveness.
- Stephen Robert Morse — Journalist and film director/producer.
- Douglas Noble — Associate Director for Public Health Emergencies Preparedness & Response at UNICEF; alumnus of Green Templeton College (Clinical Medicine).
- Baron von Pfetten (Jean Christophe Iseux von Pfetten) — French professor; Chairman of the Institute for East West Strategic Studies; former Ambassador and Senator.
- Gregory Alan Thornbury — American academic and theologian; president of The King's College (2013–2017).

== Gallery ==
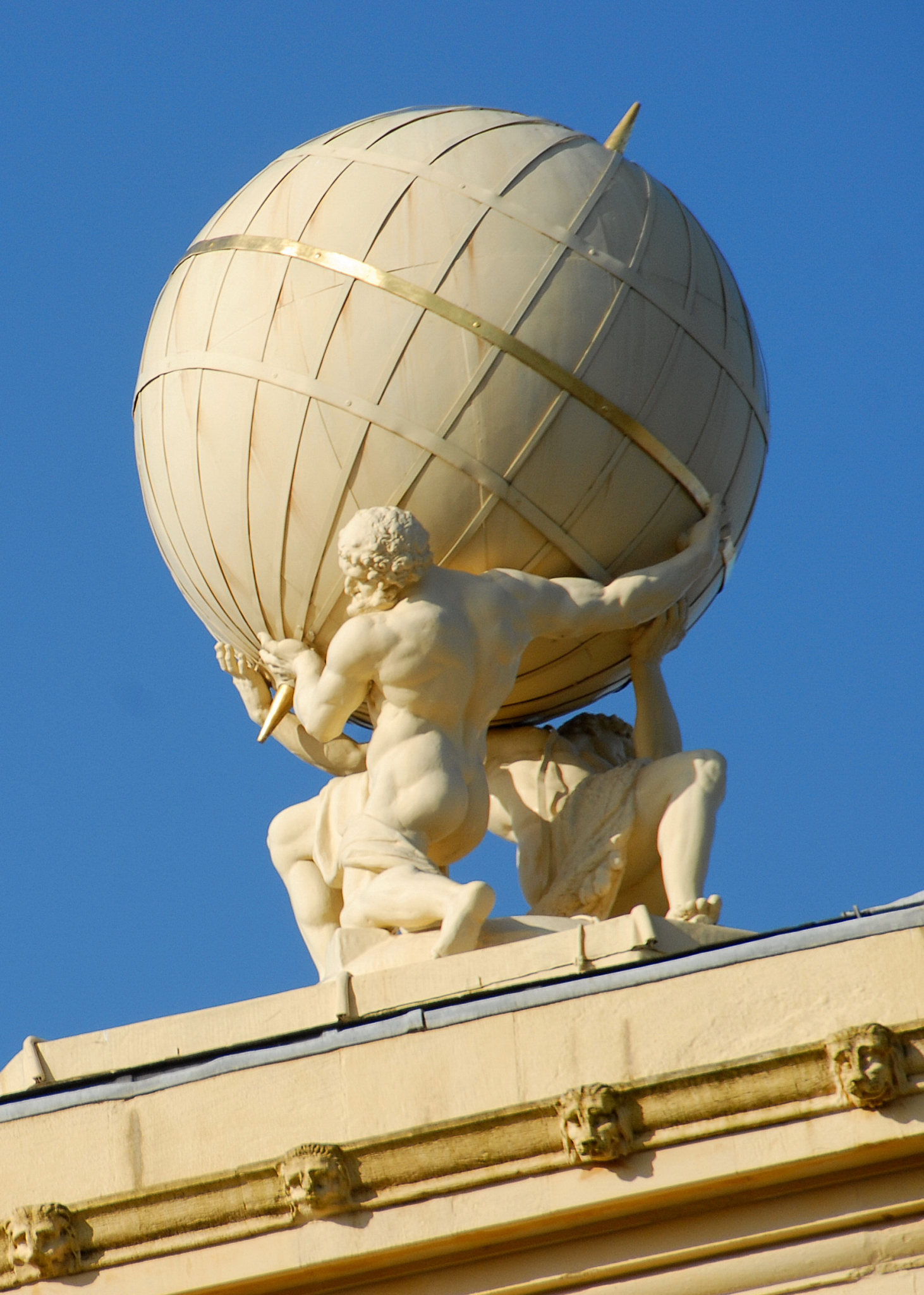
Top of the Radcliffe Observatory

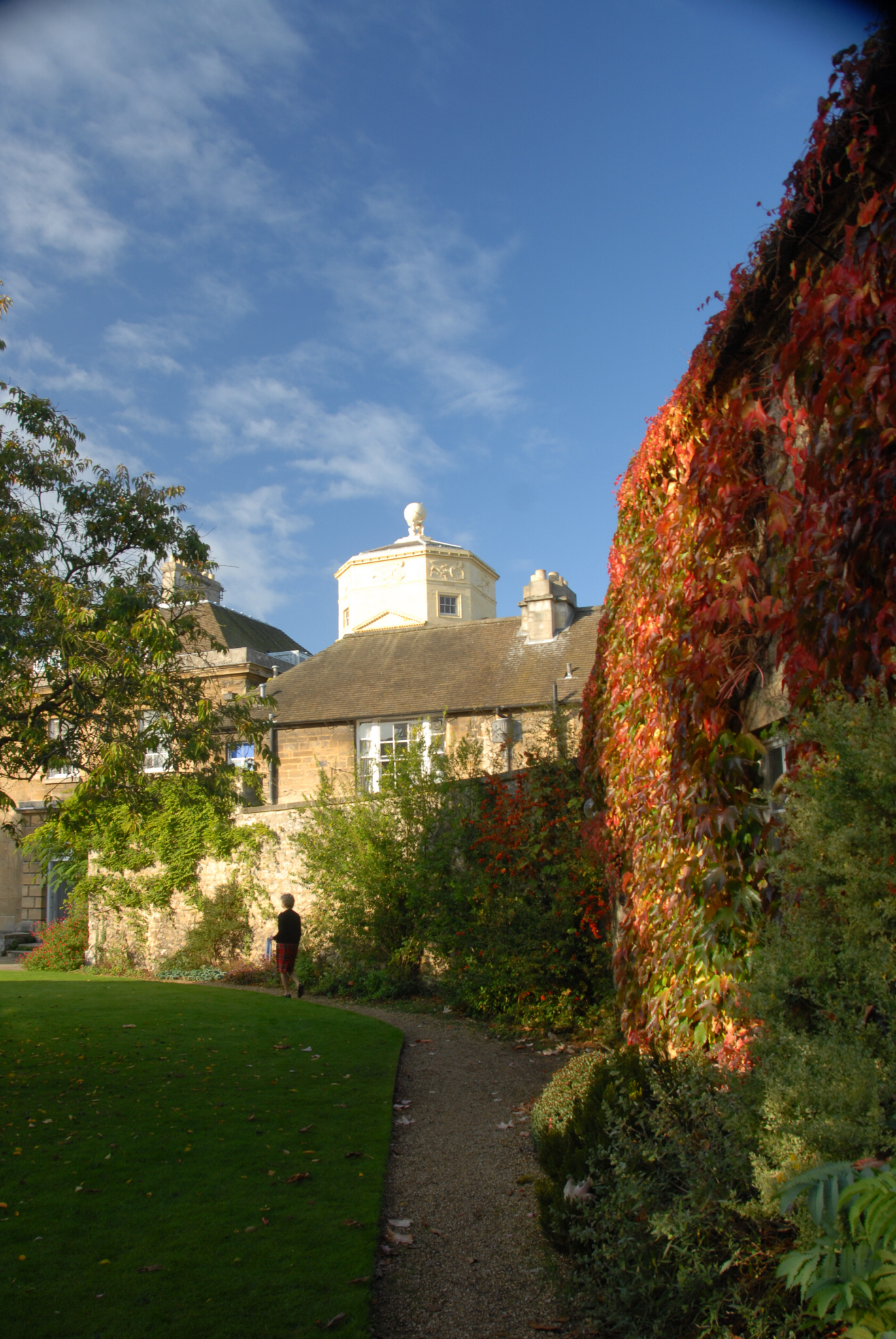
Observer’s House and McAlpine Quad

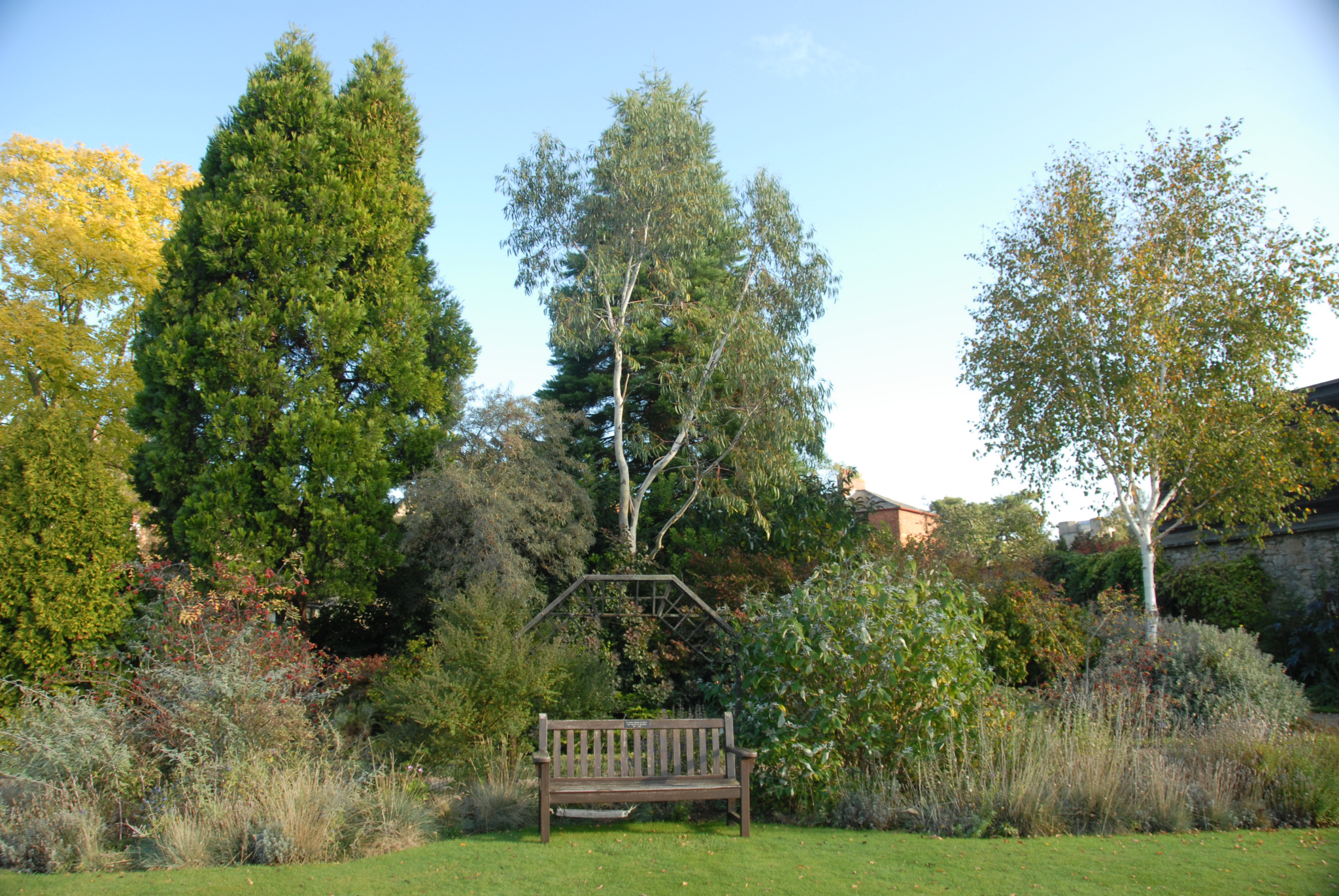
College gardens

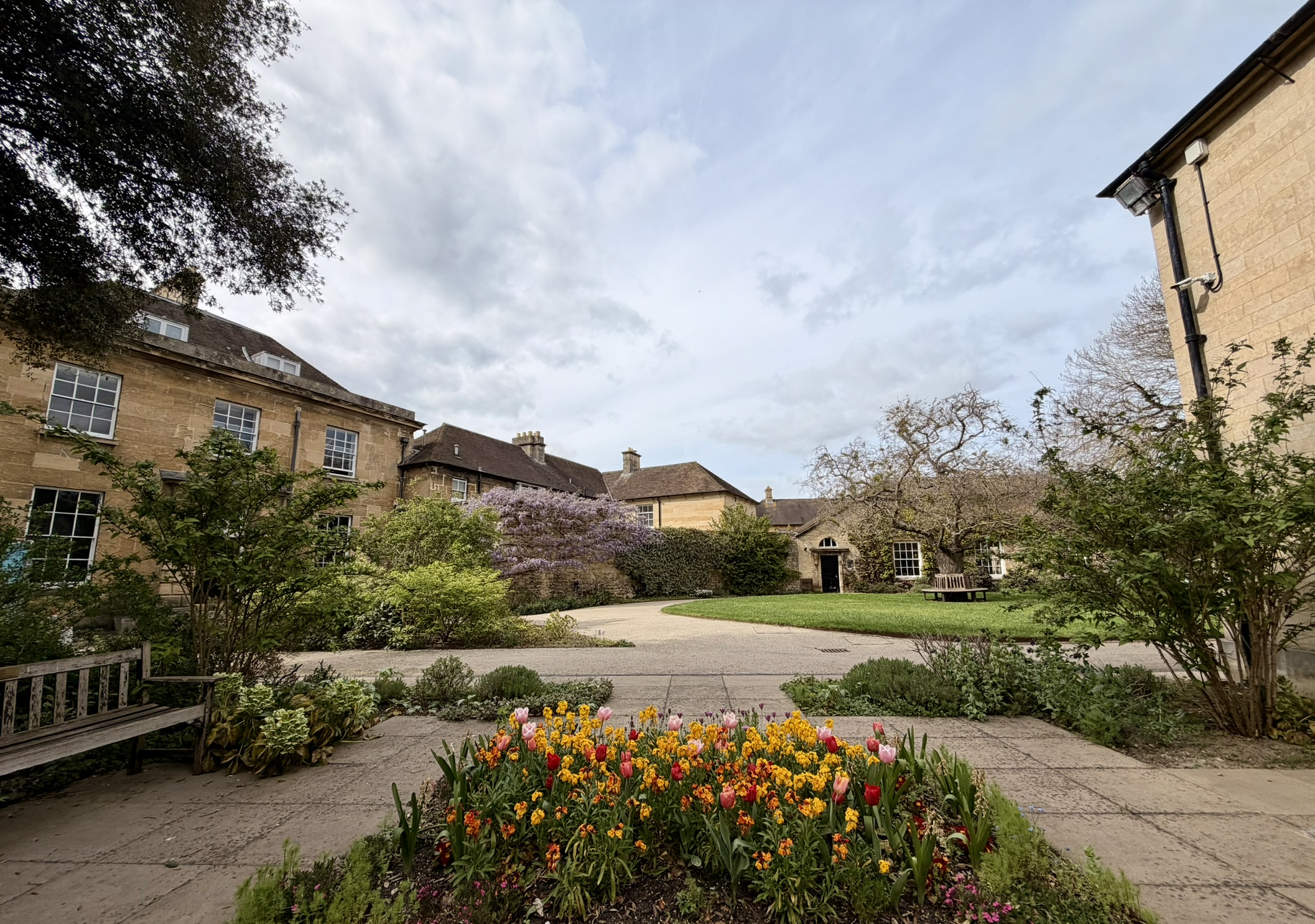
McAlpine Quad

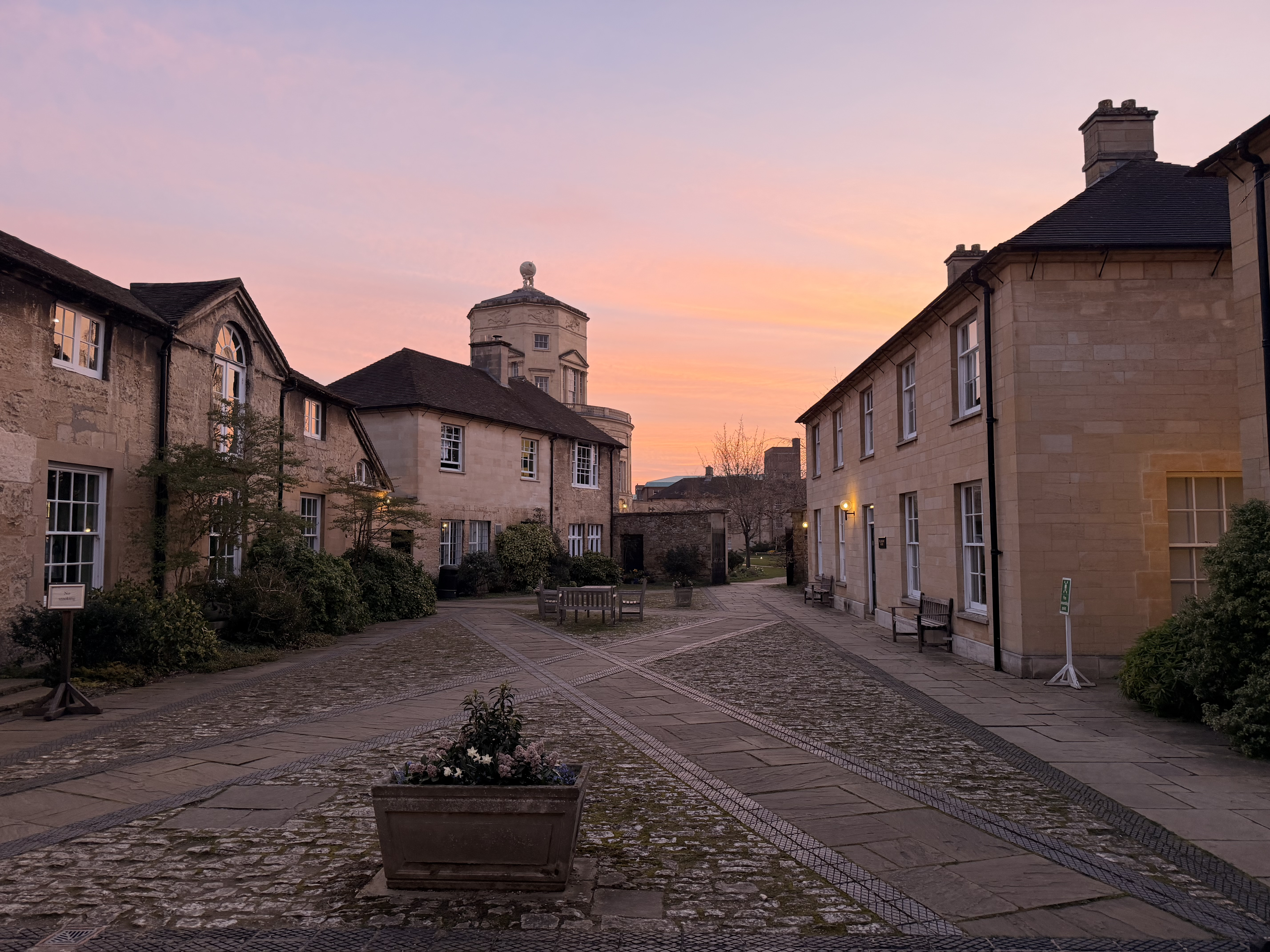
Lankester Quad

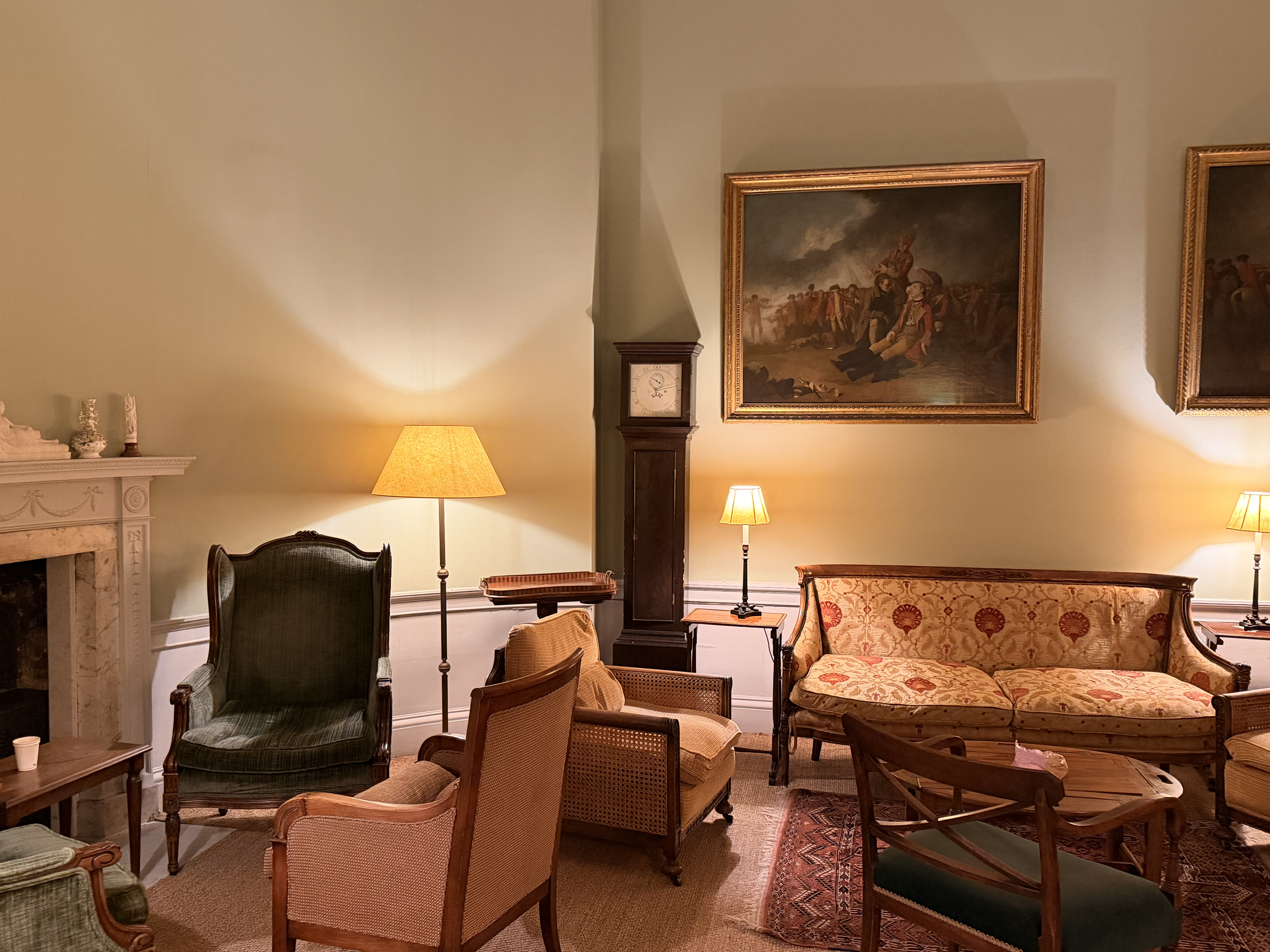
Fellows Room

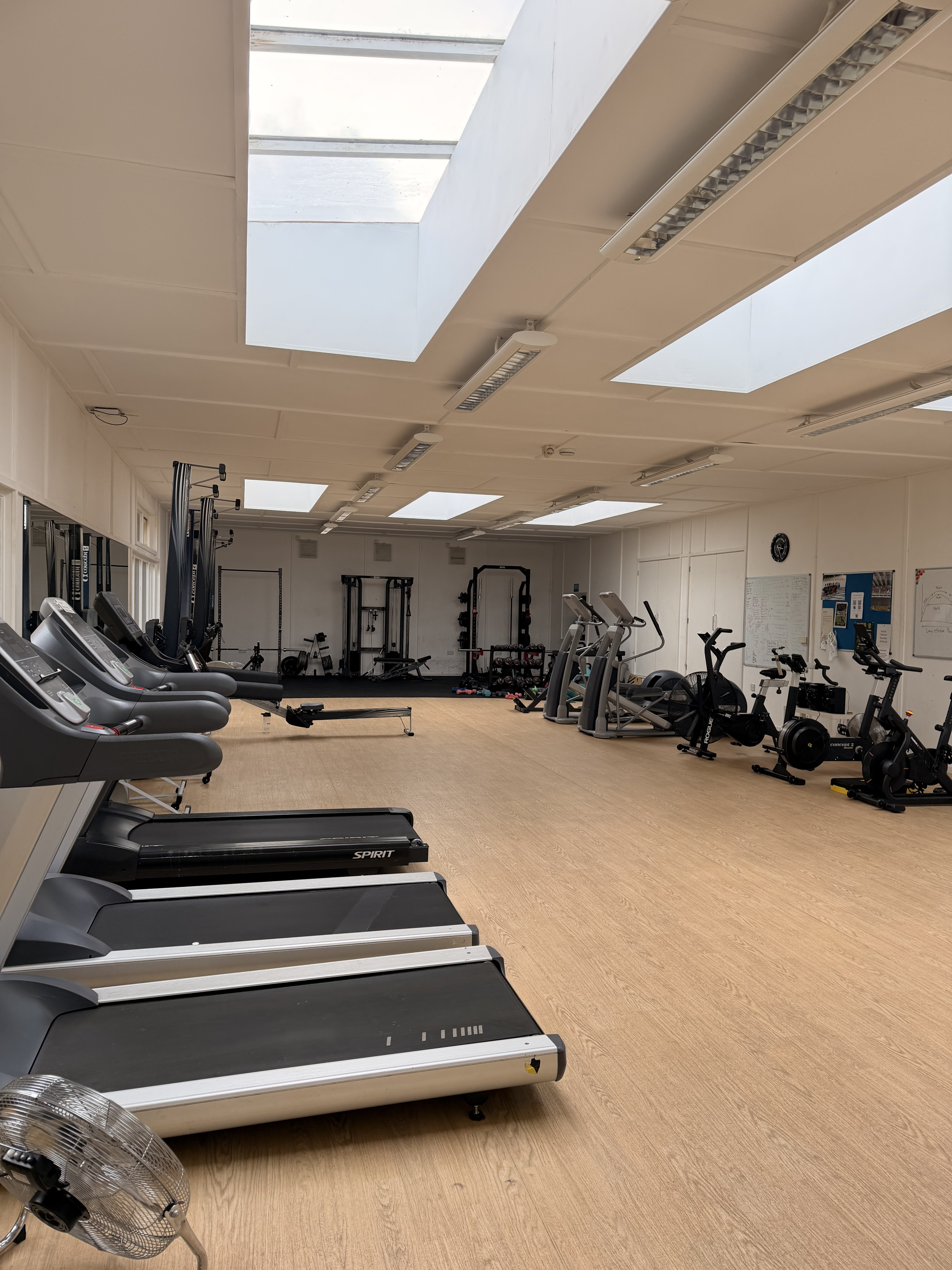
College gym

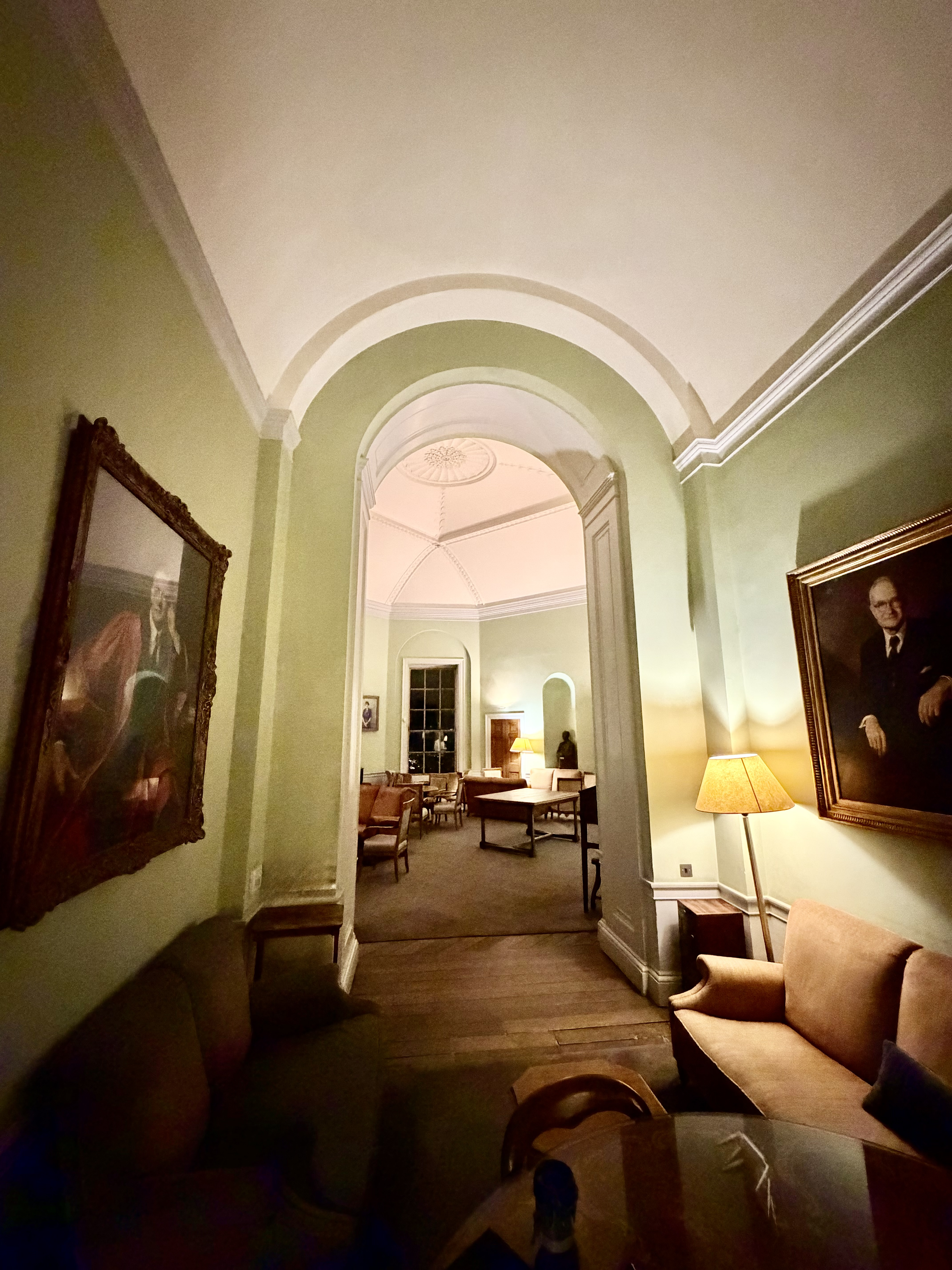
Graduate Common Room

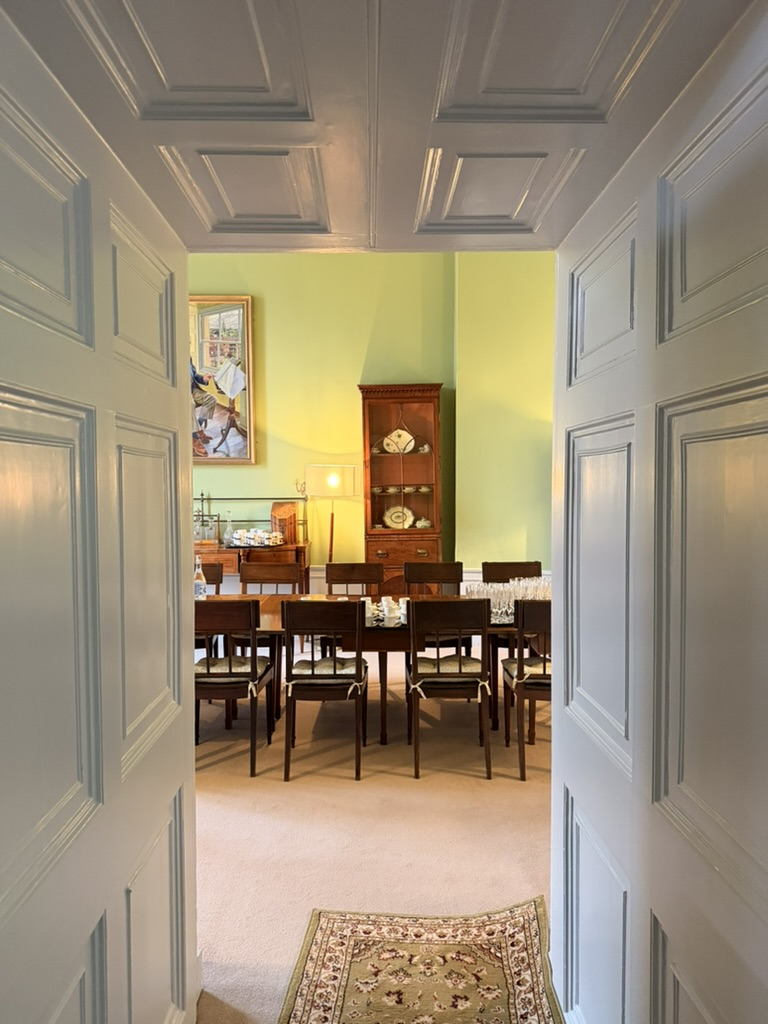
William Gibson Dining Room

== See also ==
- Alumni of Green Templeton College
- Fellows of Green Templeton College
