= Sacha (surname) =

Sacha is a surname. It is particularly common in Poland. Notable people with the surname include:

- Ioanna Sacha (born 1999), Greek swimmer
- Krzysztof Sacha (born 1970), Polish theoretical physicist
- Marek Sacha (born 1987), Czech-British businessman
- Mariusz Sacha (born 1987), Polish footballer
