= XOM Materials =

German online platform

XOM Materials GmbH
- Type: Online platform for trading materials
- Headquarters: Berlin, Germany
- Key people: Ben Papenfuß (CEO)
- Parent: Klöckner & Co SE
- Website: xom-materials.com

XOM Materials is a Berlin based online platform for trading materials, providing for buyers and sellers with an objective of the digitalization of the steel industry.

== History and description ==
XOM Materials was founded in 2017 in Berlin as an independent division of Klöckner & Co. Marek Sacha and Tim Milde are respectively chief executive officer and chief operating officer. XOM materials operates from offices in Berlin, Duisburg, and Atlanta.

XOM Marketplace was officially launched in 2018 and has evolved into a XOM Platform consisting of XOM eShop and XOM eProcurement. These components are based on a uniform technology and can be used as stand-alone tools or combined with each other. In 2020, the Gross Merchandise Volume of XOM materials reached 140 million EUR. In addition to the German and European markets, XOM Materials started its operation in North America from 2018. Tim Milde, the COO of XOM Materials appeared as speaker at the European Competition Day at the Federal Ministry of Economics in Berlin.
