= E. David Cook =

American academic

E. David Cook is a Fellow of Green College, Oxford and the first Holmes Professor of Faith and Learning at Wheaton College. He is also a visiting professor of Christian ethics at the Southern Baptist Theological Seminary in Louisville, Kentucky, and is a Senior Fellow of the Trinity Forum. He advises the archbishops and the British Government and is a member of the UK Xenotransplantation Interim Regulatory Authority. He lectures internationally and preaches in a wide variety of denominations.

He received his BS (summa cum laude) at Arizona State University in 1968 in philosophy of religion/philosophy. In 1970 he received MA (first class honours), the University of Edinburgh in mental philosophy. In 1973 he received his PhD from the University of Edinburgh. In 1984, he received an MA from the University of Oxford. In 1999, he received D.Litt., honorary degree, Gordon College, Wenham, Massachusetts. He was also awarded an honorary Doctor of Divinity from Criswell College.

== Selected papers ==
=== Books ===
- The Moral Maze, Romanian edition 2004
- Blind Alley Beliefs, Turkish edition, 2005
- The Moral Maze, Spanish edition, 2005
- Not Just Science (ed. D F Chappell and E D Cook) Zondervan, Grand Rapids, 2005
- Consultant editor, Children of Prometheus, (ed. D Russ, P.Adman) Trinity Forum Publications 2005

=== Reviews ===
- The Soul of the Embryo, David Jones, Theology, 2005
- Aiming to Kill, Nigel Biggar, Third Way, 2005

== Interviews ==
- Medical Ethics, ChristianPost.org, 2005
- Da Ali G Show, HBO, 2000
- Wheaton Underground, wetn.org, 2006
