= Green Templeton Boat Club =

Rowing club of Green Templeton College, University of Oxford

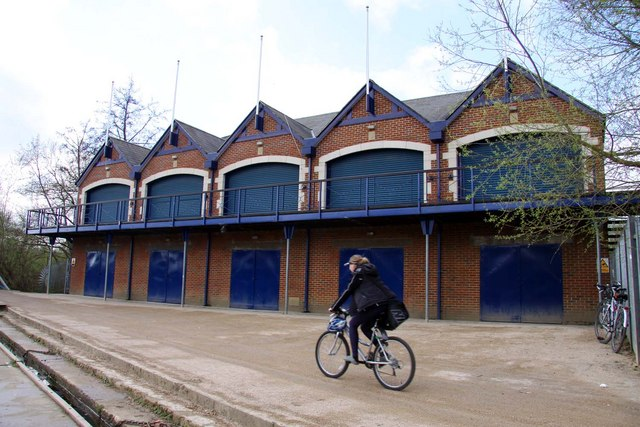

- Longbridges boathouses, shared with several Oxford colleges
- Location: Oxford
- Home water: The Isis
- Founded: 2008
- University: University of Oxford
- Colours
- Affiliations: British Rowing (boat code GTM)
- Website: www.gtc.ox.ac.uk/students/college-life/sports-clubs/green-templeton-boat-club/

Green Templeton Boat Club (GTBC) is the rowing club of Green Templeton College, Oxford, part of the University of Oxford and is affiliated to British Rowing.

The club represents the college in the university's inter-collegiate bumps races known as the Torpids and Summer Eights and since 2010 has provided multiple representatives for The Boat Race.

== History ==
The present club was created in 2008, following the merger of Green College (1979) and Templeton College (1965), which formed Green Templeton College. Before the merger the rowers of Templeton College trained at the Longbridges Boathouse in association with the Hertford College Boat Club and the Osler House Boat Club.

After 2008 the merged college established its own colours of dark blue, gold and green. During its early years the club received coaching assistance and equipment loans from neighbouring college clubs before acquiring a full independent fleet by the mid-2010s. The club gained promotions in the lower divisions of both Torpids and Summer Eights, including multiple sets of blades in 2013, 2019 and 2023.

In 2010, Martin Walsh became the first club representative to compete in men's Boat Race, an eight that included the Winklevoss twins Cameron and Tyler. The first representative to compete in women's Boat Race was Chloe Laverack during the The Boat Races 2017.

GTBC took part in the City of Oxford Regatta, winning the mixed eights in 2018.

Race coverage from 2024 and 2025 records GTBC's participation and continued progress in the lower men's and women's divisions of Summer Eights.

== Boathouse ==
GTBC is based at the historic Longbridges Boathouse on the River Thames in Oxford, which it shares with Hertford College, St Hilda’s College, St Catherine’s College and Mansfield College. The Longbridges site, originally constructed in the nineteenth century and rebuilt in 1997, is one of the oldest continuous boathouse locations in the city and remains central to Oxford’s collegiate rowing infrastructure.

== Honours ==
=== Boat Race representatives ===
The following rowers were part of the rowing club at the time of their participation in The Boat Race.

Men's boat race

Year	Name
2010	Martin Walsh
2022	Jack Robertson
2024	Elias Kun
2026	Julian Schoeberl

Women's boat race

Year	Name
2017	Chloe Laverack
2018	Jessica Buck +
2021	Anja Zehfuss
2022	Anja Zehfuss
2026	Julietta Camahort
2026	Louis Corrigan +

Key

- + = coxswain
