= Neil Mortensen =

President of Royal College of Surgeons of England

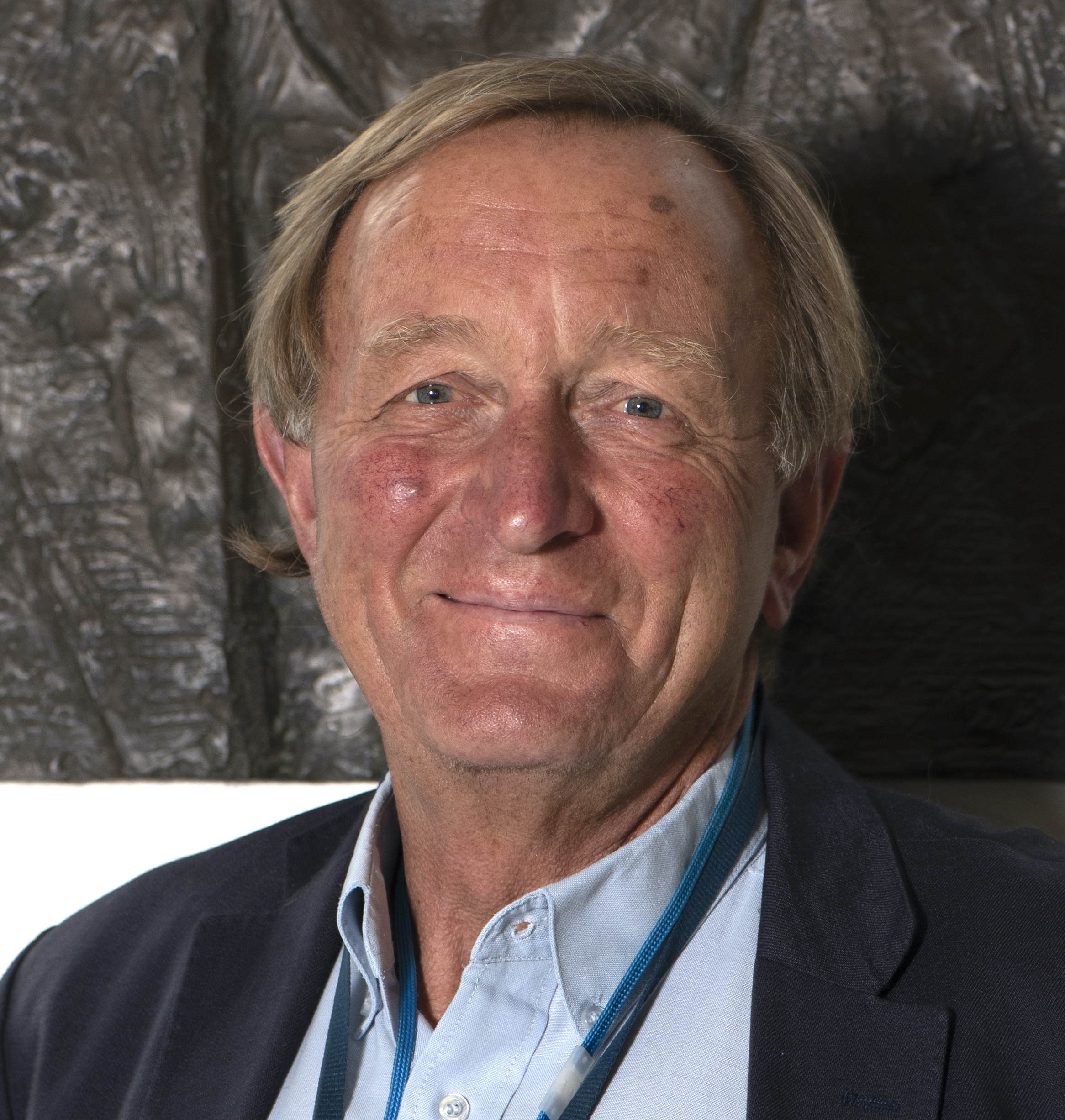
Sir Neil Mortensen

Sir Neil James McCready Mortensen FRCS is Emeritus Professor of Colorectal Surgery at the University of Oxford Medical School and has been on the staff of the Oxford University Hospitals since 1987, where he is currently honorary consultant colorectal surgeon. He is a Fellow of Green Templeton College in the University of Oxford. Following his appointment in Oxford he campaigned for the recognition of colorectal surgery as a specialty and created the present department. He has clinical and research interests in a wide range of colorectal diseases.

In 2020, he was appointed president of the Royal College of Surgeons of England.

Mortensen was knighted in the 2024 New Year Honours for services to surgery.

== Early life and education ==
Mortensen was born in Windsor on October 16 1949. He attended Hampton School, and the University of Birmingham Medical School, MB ChB 1973, and University of Bristol, MD 1977. After early surgical training in Bristol and the South West, and higher training at St Marks Hospital he was appointed Senior Lecturer in Surgery, University of Bristol 1981-1986. In 1980 he was awarded a Paul Hawley International Guest Scholarship with the American College of Surgeons. In 1987 he joined the Oxford University Hospitals and became Professor of Colorectal Surgery in 1994.

== Career ==
He is past chair of the British Journal of Surgery Society, and has been past president of the Ileostomy Association, the Association of Coloproctology GBI and the Coloproctology Section of the Royal Society of Medicine. He is immediate past editor in chief of Colorectal Disease. Mortensen is an honorary member of a number of national and international surgical societies including Honorary Fellow of the American College of Surgeons and the American Surgical Society. In 1999 he co-founded the Alpine Colorectal Meeting which has been highly influential across Europe. He founded the first patient association for those with ileoanal pouches, the Kangaroo Club in 2000, and in 2004 the charity OCCTOPUS – Oxford Colon Cancer Trust, which supports education, research and the introduction of new technology in colorectal diseases.

He became a member of the council of the Royal College of Surgeons of England in 2013, and a member of the trustee board in 2016. He served as editor in chief of the Bulletin 2014-2019. In 2017 he was elected vice president, and in 2020 he became president of the Royal College of Surgeons of England.

During his presidency, he helped navigate the challenges of the COVID-19 pandemic, having initially started his term fully remotely. He worked closely with the NHS to tackle the elective surgery backlog and promoted the concept of Surgical Hubs. He led the college's return to its rebuilt and refurbished headquarters in Lincoln's Inn Fields 2021-22 and commissioned the Kennedy Review and Action Plan 2021, looking at Diversity, Equity and Inclusion within the profession. He opened the newly repositioned and rebuilt Hunterian Museum in Spring 2023. He demitted as president in July 2023.

He chairs the National Cancer Audit Collaborative, NATCAN, the charity OCCTOPUS Oxford Colon Cancer Trust, and the University of Oxford Medical Sciences Division Lee Placito Medical Fund.

Outside medicine he chairs Oxford University Real Tennis Club.

== Selected publications ==
- Jewell DP, Mortensen NJMcC, Steinhart HA, Pemberton JH, Warren BF. (2006). Challenges in Inflammatory Bowel Disease 2nd edition. Blackwell Publishing Oxford.
- Givel JC, Mortensen NJMcC, Roche B. (2009). Anorectal and Colonic Diseases: a practical guide to their management. Springer Heidelberg.
- O'Kelly, T., Brading, A., & Mortensen, N. (1993). Nerve mediated relaxation of the human internal anal sphincter: the role of nitric oxide. Gut, 34(5), 689–693.
- Kusters, M., Slater, A., Muirhead, R., Hompes, R., Guy, R. J., Jones, O. M., George, B. D., Lindsey, I., Mortensen, N. J., & Cunningham, C. (2017). What To Do With Lateral Nodal Disease in Low Locally Advanced Rectal Cancer? A Call for Further Reflection and Research. Diseases of the colon and rectum, 60(6), 577–585.
- Yeung, T. M., Wang, L. M., Colling, R., Kraus, R., Cahill, R., Hompes, R., & Mortensen, N. J. (2018). Intraoperative identification and analysis of lymph nodes at laparoscopic colorectal cancer surgery using fluorescence imaging combined with rapid OSNA pathological assessment. Surgical endoscopy, 32(2), 1073–1076.
