= Mahiben Maruthappu =

British physician, entrepreneur, academic researcher (born 1988)

- Born: 1988 (age 37–38); London, England
- Citizenship: United Kingdom
- Education: University of Cambridge; University of Oxford; Harvard University
- Occupations: Physician, entrepreneur, researcher
- Years active: 2011 to present
- Known for: Founder, Cera, NHS Innovation Accelerator, academic research
- Awards: Entrepreneur of the Year at the British Business Awards 2026; EY UK Entrepreneur of the Year Award 2024; Great British Entrepreneur of the Year Award 2023; MBE in the Queen's 2020 New Year Honours
- Medical career
- Institutions: Imperial College London and UCL (research and medical practice); National Health Service (UK), Cera, UKMSA
- Sub-specialties: Innovation, technology & research in healthcare
- Research: Health economics, public health

Mahiben Maruthappu MBE (born 1988, also known as Ben Maruthappu) is a British physician, entrepreneur, academic researcher, health policy specialist, and the founder and chief executive of Cera, Europe’s largest healthtech company. In 2025, its annualized revenue was £500 million.

Prior to Cera, Maruthappu co-founded the National Health Service (NHS) Innovation Accelerator (NIA), a programme intended to accelerate the adoption of new healthcare technologies, and was NHS England's Innovation Adviser. He was also the founder and first president of the United Kingdom Medical Students' Association (UKMSA). He has contributed to more than 100 academic papers in peer-reviewed journals.

Maruthappu represented the UK at the EY World Entrepreneur of the Year 2025, was overall winner of EY's UK Entrepreneur of the Year 2024, and overall winner of Great British Entrepreneur of the Year 2023. In 2020, he was appointed Member of the Order of the British Empire (MBE) in the Queen's New Year Honours for services to Health and Social Care technology. He was recently named a Bloomberg New Economy Catalyst, has been listed as one of WIRED's 10 Innovators in Healthcare, and was named in the 2015 Forbes 30 Under 30 list. In 2025 and 2026, Maruthappu appeared in the Sunday Times list of the 40 Richest People Under 40, with a net worth of £141 million.

== Early life and education ==
Maruthappu was born in London in 1988 to Sri Lankan Tamils parents. He studied preclinical medicine at Selwyn College, Cambridge, where he graduated with a triple first class, and as a student ran several charities, including Medic to Medic. While at Selwyn, he became the first undergraduate invited to lecture medical students. He then studied clinical medicine at Green Templeton College, Oxford and in his fifth year founded the United Kingdom Medical Students' Association (UKMSA). He was also a Kennedy Scholar in Global Health at Harvard University, where he conducted research at Harvard's Center for Surgery and Public Health.

== Career ==
=== Medical practice ===
Maruthappu began his career as a physician at Ealing Hospital in 2013. He later practised at Chelsea & Westminster Hospital NHS Foundation Trust and then trained in Public Health. In 2014, he was appointed scholar at the National Institute for Health and Care Excellence, where he focused on the use of structured feedback in surgery.

=== NHS Policy ===
In 2014, Maruthappu became the first appointed Senior Fellow to the Chief Executive Officer of NHS England, Simon Stevens.

Whilst at the National Health Service, Maruthappu advised on innovation, technology and prevention, and in 2015, he co-founded the NHS Innovation Accelerator (NIA), a programme aimed at spreading technologies across the health service, that also led to the development of the first NHS Innovation Tariff.

He co-founded the NHS's £450 million Workplace Wellness Programme and the Diabetes Prevention Programme (DPP) which, as of 2017, had been rolled out to half of the population in England. He led NHS England's contribution to the Government's Childhood Obesity Plan.

=== Entrepreneurship ===
After his mother fell and fractured part of her back, Maruthappu and his sister faced difficulties in arranging required home care. In 2016, he founded Cera, Europe’s largest HealthTech and a Unicorn, valued at over $1 billion. In its early days, the company started out as an on-demand digital platform to match people seeking in-home assistance with professional carers, allowing families to keep updated on a patient's progress.

Cera is Europe’s largest HealthTech, employing around 13,500 staff, delivering roughly 3 million monthly home care visits across the UK. Cera develops technology intended to support preventative care, using data collected from more than 100 million home care visits. According to the company, its AI tools have reduced patient falls by 20% and hospitalisations by up to 70%, and have generated savings of more than £1 billion for the UK Government and the NHS, equivalent to more than £1.5 million per day.

Maruthappu has overseen the development of AI agents intended to support the care workforce and improve staff productivity. In 2025, he led the acquisition of Cera’s own line of home care robots GenieConnect, leading the adoption of robots in UK care. In 2026, he announced an investment in the eight-figure range to establish an AI laboratory focused on the care sector, which the company described as the first of its kind.

Under Maruthappu’s leadership, Cera ran a “Back to Work” programme aimed at recruiting people who had been out of work for extended periods into care roles, according to the company, the programme has created several thousand jobs. In 2026, Cera launched a “Better Start Scheme” for people aged 18 to 24, including those not in employment, education or training (NEET). The company has stated that it is a partner in the UK Government’s Youth Guarantee scheme.

Maruthappu has been acknowledged for his role in reducing NHS costs and building a more sustainable future for health and social care, including by The Times and Sunday Times, The Telegraph, and City AM.

== Boards and affiliations ==
Maruthappu was formerly a Board Member of NHS North West London Integrated Care Board (covering a population of over 2 million people) and of Imperial College Healthcare NHS Trust, one of the UK's largest NHS Trusts, with £1.2 billion turnover. He was also formerly a Board Member for Skills for Care, the national body for the UK's 1.5 million care workforce– a workforce Maruthappu has helped to grow, attracting 1 million new carer and nurse applicants to Cera in 2 years. He was also a Founding Board Member of Digital Health London.

Maruthappu is a member of the advisory board for HealthTechDigital.

Maruthappu is a Senior Advisor to Bain & Company, and has advised a range of organisations, from startups to multilaterals, including the Swiss government, the Telegraph and the WHO. He is Chairman of the UK Medical Students' Association (UKMSA) and has authored three medical books. He writes for The Times, and The Guardian, and has lectured undergraduate students at Cambridge University since the age of 20.

== Awards and recognition ==
- Entrepreneur of the Year at the British Business Awards 2026
- Sunday Times Rich List 2025: 40 Under 40
- EY UK Entrepreneur of the Year Award 2024 (Overall Winner).
- Great British Entrepreneur of the Year Award 2023 (Overall Winner)
- Maruthappu was appointed Member of the Order of the British Empire (MBE) in the 2020 New Year Honours for services to Health and Social Care technology, becoming the youngest doctor to receive the honour.
- Financial Times Top 10 most influential BAME tech leaders in UK
- WIRED's 10 Innovators in Healthcare (2016)
- Forbes 30 under 30 list (2015)

== Research and selected publications ==
Maruthappu's research focuses on public health, innovation and health economics and he has contributed to more than 100 academic papers in peer-reviewed journals.

He also partook in the 2017 study demonstrating that health & social care funding constraints in England were linked to 120,000 excess deaths; a so called "mortality gap".

=== Bibliography ===
- Maruthappu M. Sugandh K. Medical School: The Applicant's Guide, Doctors Academy Ltd., 2013 and 2010, ISBN 9380573278
- Maruthappu M. Sugandh K. Medical School: The Undergraduate's Guide Doctors Academy Ltd., 2013 ISBN 9380573286
