= Marek Sacha =

Czech-British executive

- Born: 6 June 1987 (age 39); Czechoslovakia
- Citizenship: Czech
- Education: Johannes Kepler Universität Linz; Czech Technical University
- Years active: 2011 to present
- Known for: Cera Care; XOM Materials

Marek Sacha (born 6 June 1987) is a Czech-British businessman. He was the co-founder of Cera Care, and the first CEO of Rohlik.cz and head of XOM Materials.

== Biography ==
Sacha completed a master's degree at the Czech Technical University in Prague, and a second masters degree in 2011 from Johannes Kepler University Linz in Austria. He worked as a consultant for McKinsey for about three years after leaving higher education.

In 2014, Tomáš Čupr founded Czech online supermarket Rohlik.cz, with Sacha as 1st CEO. He was head of the company for the initial period before transferring his share and leaving the organization. In 2015 Sacha co-founded Cera Care with Mahiben Maruthappu and Martin Ocenas. He was the head of Cera Care from 2015 to 2018, when Nick Clegg joined Cera as chairman of the advisory board. In the same year Sacha joined XOM Materials, an initiative of Klöckner. In 2017, Sacha was selected by Forbes Czech Republic as among the "30 under the age of 30".
