= Hunterian Museum =

There are two museums called the Hunterian Museum, each named after one of the brothers John and William Hunter.

- Hunterian Museum, London – named after John Hunter (1728–1793)
- Hunterian Museum, Glasgow – named after William Hunter (1718–1783)

== See also ==
- Hunterian (disambiguation)
