= Hunterian =

The adjective Hunterian means "related to (Mr) Hunter", and is most commonly used to refer to the brothers John and William Hunter. and may refer to:

- Things related to John Hunter (1728–1793)
  - Hunterian Society – medical society eponymous to Hunter
  - Hunterian Museum, London – located at the Royal College of Surgeons of England
  - Hunterian Oration – annual lecture at the Royal College of Surgeons of England
- Things related to William Hunter (1718–1783)
  - Hunterian Collection – a collection of Hunter's books, coins, and specimens
  - Hunterian Museum and Art Gallery – a museum which contains the Hunterian Collection
  - Hunterian Psalter – named after Hunter, whose collection it belonged to
- Things related to William Wilson Hunter (1840–1900)
  - Hunterian transliteration
