= Medic to Medic =

Medic to Medic logo

Medic to Medic is a UK registered charity supporting trainee health workers in developing countries with the costs of their education.

== History ==
The aim of the Medic to Medic is to guarantee the tuition fees for healthcare students who have academic potential, but are in financial need in developing countries. With this consistency of income, students are able to focus on their studies until graduation.

Medic to Medic links student health workers in developing countries to international donors. In this way, they function along the lines of “sponsor a child” schemes run by well-known charities. Of note, although individual students are linked to donors, donations are pooled so that even if a donor withdraws, no student is left disadvantaged. At first, donors were mostly health professionals (hence “Medic to Medic”), but now include many members of the public as well.

Students send their linked sponsor regular updates on their progress. This can then develop into a correspondence if the donor so wishes. Students are supported with tuition fees and other necessary allowances as well as being given a medical equipment pack and textbooks so that they have everything they need to reach their FULL potential and successfully qualify as health workers in their home country. As of September 2021, over 62 students are being supported with a graduate alumni of over 140 health professionals.

Medic to Medic has expanded from sponsoring only medical students to sponsoring a whole range of trainee health professionals, from one country to three and from one university to six. This has all been thanks to donors, fundraisers, supporters, partner institutions and a fantastically enthusiastic team.

== See also ==
- Education in Malawi
- Education in Uganda
