= Women's Boat Race 2014 =

Rowing competition between Oxford University and Cambridge University in 2014

69th Women's Boat Race
- Date: 30 March 2014
- Winner: Oxford
- Margin of victory: 4 lengths
- Winning time: 5 minutes 50 seconds
- Overall record (Cambridge–Oxford): 41–28
- Umpire: Judith Packer

The 69th Women's Boat Race took place on 30 March 2014. The race, between crews representing Oxford University Women's Boat Club and Cambridge University Women's Boat Club, was umpired by Judith Packer. Cambridge's crew, the heavier of the two, was entirely British, while Oxford's boat included rowers from Canada, Switzerland and the United States. Oxford won by four lengths in a time of 5 minutes 50 seconds, their second consecutive win. The victory took the overall record in the event to 41–28 in Cambridge's favour. It was the last time the race would be conducted over a 2 km (1.2 mi) straight race as part of the Henley Boat Races.

== Background ==
The Women's Boat Race is a side-by-side rowing competition between eights from Oxford University Women's Boat Club and the Cambridge University Women's Boat Club that has taken place since 1927. Oxford went into the race as champions, having won the previous year's race by one and three-quarter lengths; Cambridge led 41–27 overall. It was the last time the race would be conducted as part of the Henley Boat Races, along a 2-kilometre (1.2 mi) stretch of the River Thames referred to as the Straight Course which is used for the Henley Royal Regatta since 1924. The 2015 race would be conducted on The Championship Course on the same day as men's race.

Cambridge's number five, Catherine Foot, remarked "After training, I step back and think 'wow, I'm part of this incredible tradition'. There is nothing else I'd rather be doing than training for this event", while Oxford's stroke Amber de Vere said "All the training has been leading up to this weekend. Next year is definitely exciting and it has added something to training, but as a crew, we're only thinking about Sunday." This year's race was umpired by Judith Packer and was sponsored by Newton Investment Management, a subsidiary of The Bank of New York Mellon, for the third successive year.

== Crews ==
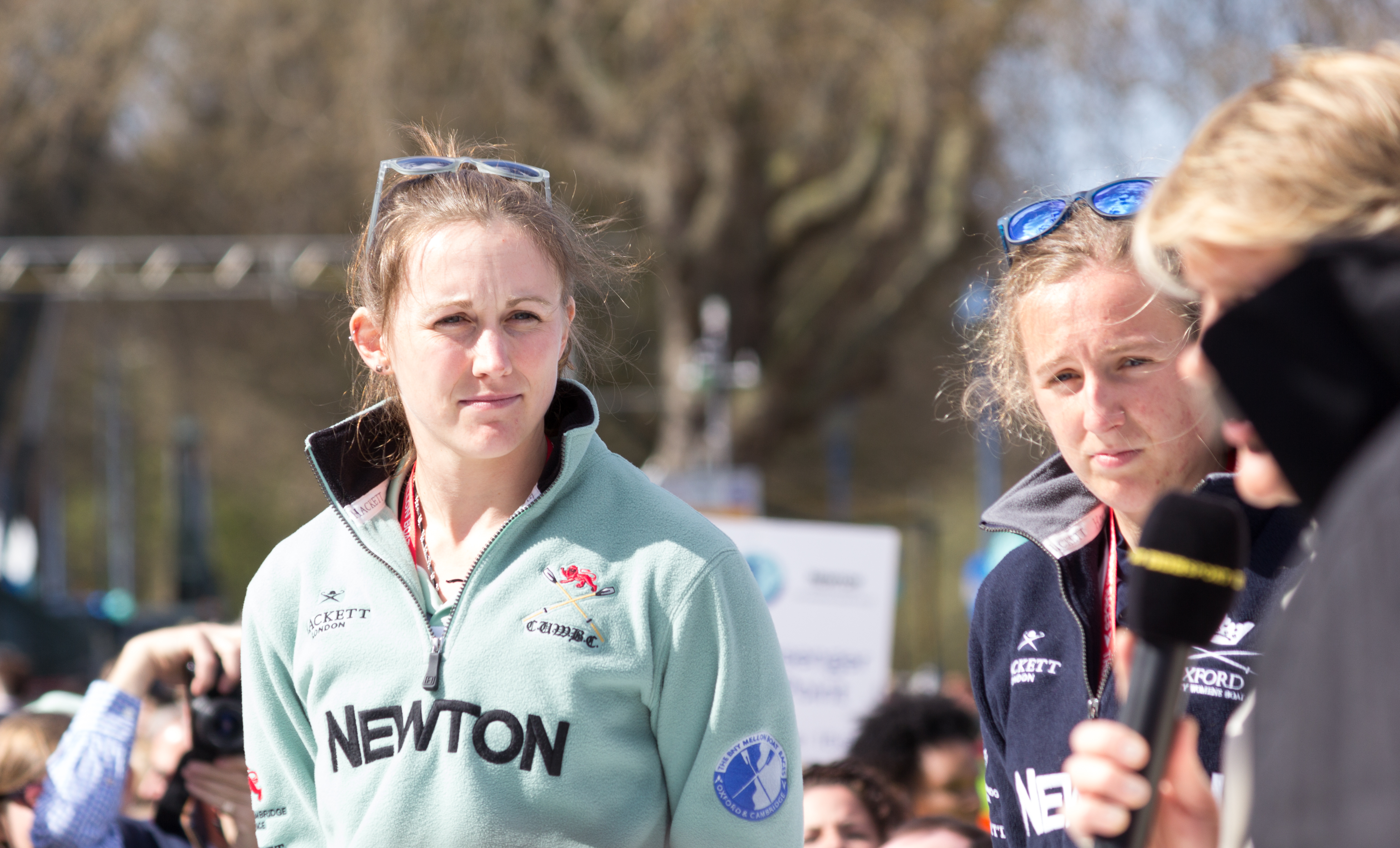
Cambridge's bow Caroline Reid (left) and Oxford number seven Anastasia Chitty (pictured in 2015)

During the build-up to the race, the two universities sent trial boats to race on 19 December 2013. For the first time in the history of the competition, this took place on the Tideway on part of the Championship Course. The two Cambridge boats were named Nudge Nudge and Wink Wink (with a third reserve boat called Say No More), while Oxford's trialists rowed in Cleopatra and Boudicca. Both trials were overseen by Olympic bronze medallist Sarah Winckless.

The Cambridge crew weighed an average of 73.2 kg (161 lb) per rower, 4 kilograms (8.8 lb) more than their opponents. Three members of Oxford's 2013 crew returned to race in 2014: Alice Carrington-Windo, Maxie Scheske and Anastasia Chitty. Cambridge's boat included two double Blues in Caroline Reid and Holly Game, while four other members of the crew had taken part in the previous year's race. Every member of the Cambridge crew was British, while Oxford's boat included Canadian Elizabeth Fence, German/Britons Carrington-Windo and Scheske, Nadine Graedel Iberg from Switzerland and American Laura Savarese (who had rowed in the Harvard–Yale Regatta for Harvard University on four occasions).

Seat	Cambridge					Oxford		
Seat	Name	College	Nationality	Weight	Name	College	Nationality	Weight
Bow	Caroline Reid	Jesus	British	64.4 kg (142 lb)	Elizabeth Fenje	Kellogg	Canadian	58.6 kg (129 lb)
2	Kate Ashley	Peterhouse	British	75.0 kg (165 lb)	Alice Carrington-Windo	Kellogg	German/British	67.2 kg (148 lb)
3	Holly Game	Girton	British	74.6 kg (164 lb)	Maxie Scheske (P)	Magdalen	German/British	64.8 kg (143 lb)
4	Isabella Vyvyan	Hughes Hall	British	87.2 kg (192 lb)	Lauren Kedar	Exeter	British	75.4 kg (166 lb)
5	Catherine Foot	Girton	British	71.0 kg (157 lb)	Nadine Graedel Iberg	Lincoln	Swiss	72.6 kg (160 lb)
6	Melissa Wilson	Gonville and Caius	British	77.0 kg (170 lb)	Laura Savarese	Corpus Christi	American	73.6 kg (162 lb)
7	Claire Watkins	Clare	British	72.6 kg (160 lb)	Anastasia Chitty	Pembroke	British	69.4 kg (153 lb)
Stroke	Emily Day	Emmanuel	British	64.0 kg (141 lb)	Amber de Vere	Somerville	British	72.0 kg (159 lb)
Cox	Esther Momcilovic (P)	Clare	British	52.4 kg (116 lb)	Erin Wysocki-Jones	Pembroke	British	49.6 kg (109 lb)
Sources: (P) – boat club president

== Race ==
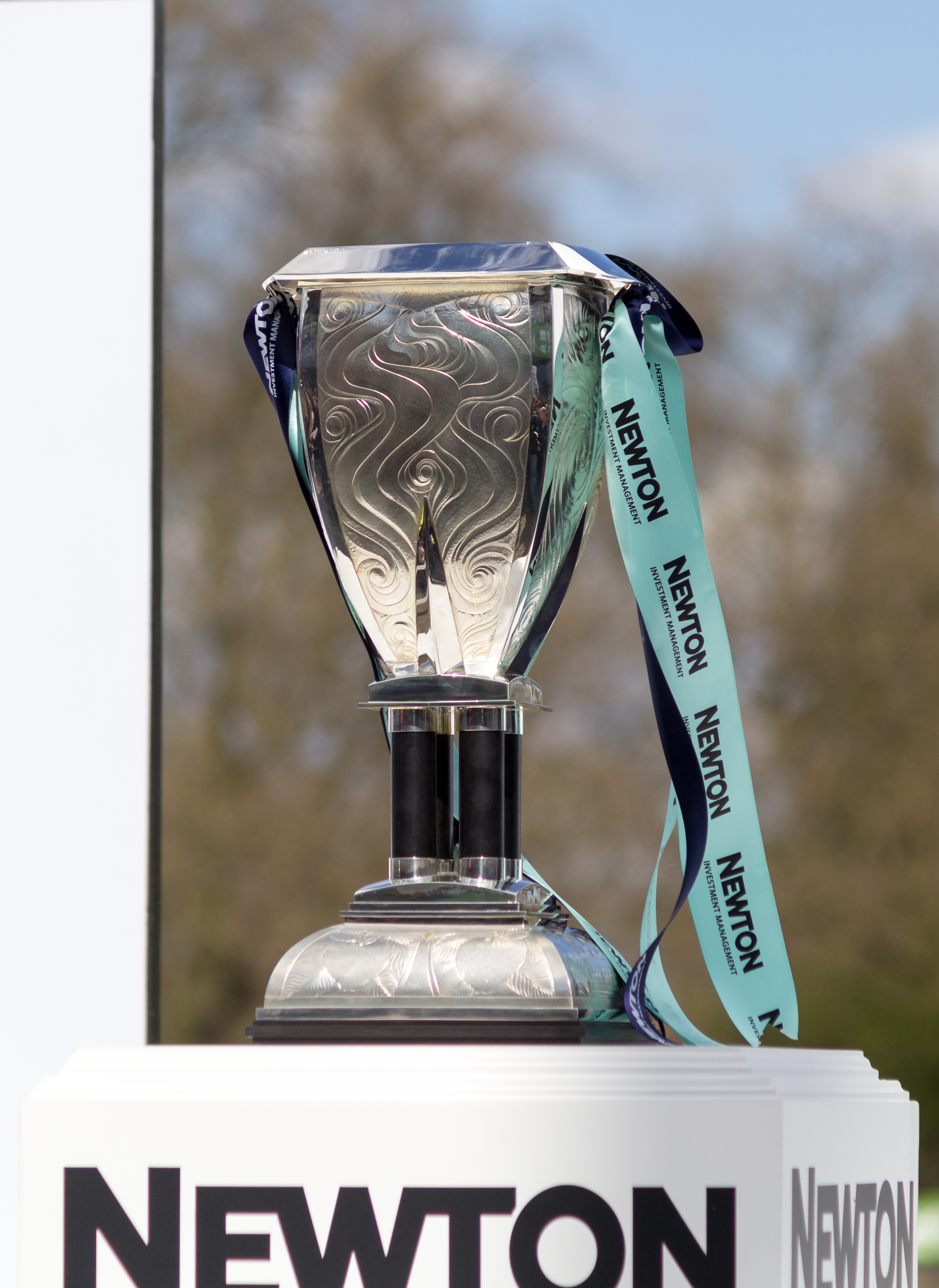
A newly designed trophy (pictured in 2015) was presented by Olympic gold medallist Sophie Hosking.

Cambridge won the toss and elected to start from the Berkshire side, handing the Buckinghamshire station to Oxford. At 3 p.m., umpire Palmer dropped the flag to start the race. Both crews went off rating 40 strokes per minute and after the first 500 metres (550 yd) Oxford were half a length ahead. By the time the crews passed the Upper Thames Rowing Club, Oxford's lead was over a length. Cambridge made a series of pushes; both crews were warned by the umpire to avoid a collision. Oxford continued to extend their lead to win by four lengths, the largest winning margin since the 2010 race. Their time was 5 minutes 50 seconds, six seconds slower than the record time set by Oxford in the 2006 race. The victory was Oxford's second consecutive win and their sixth in the last seven; it took the overall record in the event to 41–28 in Cambridge's favour.

The former Oxford cox Rachel Quarrell, writing in The Daily Telegraph stated that the race "was won in storming style" and suggested the contest was over within the first two minutes. A newly designed trophy, to replace the existing wooden shield, was awarded to the Oxford president by Olympic gold medallist Sophie Hosking who had won the Women's lightweight double sculls at the 2012 Summer Olympics.

== See also ==
- The Boat Race 2014
