= The Boat Race 1982 =

128th boat race between Oxford and Cambridge universities in England

128th Boat Race
- Date: 27 March 1982
- Winner: Oxford
- Margin of victory: 3 1/4 lengths
- Winning time: 18 minutes 21 seconds
- Overall record (Cambridge–Oxford): 68–59
- Umpire: Michael Muir-Smith (Cambridge)

Other races
- Reserve winner: Isis
- Women's winner: Cambridge

The 128th Boat Race took place on 27 March 1982. Held annually, the Boat Race is a side-by-side rowing race between crews from the Universities of Oxford and Cambridge along the River Thames. Oxford won by 3 1/4 lengths, securing their seventh consecutive victory. Their number five, Boris Rankov, won a record fifth Boat Race as a rower, and Oxford's Clay brothers became the first twins to win the event.

In the reserve race, Oxford's Isis beat Cambridge's Goldie by 1 1/4 lengths, and in the Women's Boat Race, Cambridge were victorious.

== Background ==
The Boat Race is a side-by-side rowing competition between the University of Oxford (sometimes referred to as the "Dark Blues") and the University of Cambridge (sometimes referred to as the "Light Blues"). First held in 1829, the race takes place on the 4.2-mile (6.8 km) Championship Course on the River Thames in southwest London. The rivalry is a major point of honour between the two universities and followed throughout the United Kingdom and broadcast worldwide. Oxford went into the race as reigning champions, having beaten Cambridge by eight lengths in the previous year's race. However Cambridge held the overall lead, with 68 victories to Oxford's 58 (excluding the "dead heat" of 1877).

The first Women's Boat Race took place in 1927, but did not become an annual fixture until the 1960s. Up until 2014, the contest was conducted as part of the Henley Boat Races, but as of the 2015 race, it is held on the River Thames, on the same day as the men's main and reserve races. The reserve race, contested between Oxford's Isis boat and Cambridge's Goldie boat has been held since 1965. It usually takes place on the Tideway, prior to the main Boat Race.

During the pre-race preparations, the Cambridge crew struck a floating railway sleeper near Chiswick Eyot, damaging their boat, which needed repair before the race. Oxford's crew suffered illness in the days leading up the race, in particular the president Nick Conington who was moved from stroke to bow to reduce the chances of a possible recurrence of glandular fever.

== Crews ==
The Oxford crew weighed an average of just below 14 st (88.7 kg) per rower, and had a 10 pounds (4.5 kg) per man advantage over Cambridge. Oxford saw four former Blues return, including the first female cox in Sue Brown. Cambridge's crew contained a single Blue in boat club president Roger Stephens. Despite retiring from rowing, Boris Rankov, a junior fellow at St Hugh's was persuaded back into the crew by the Oxford boat club president Nick Conington. Rankov was rowing in his fifth consecutive Boat Race, alongside Steve Foster whom he supervised in classics. Oxford's crew also contained the Clay twins, Robert and Hugh.

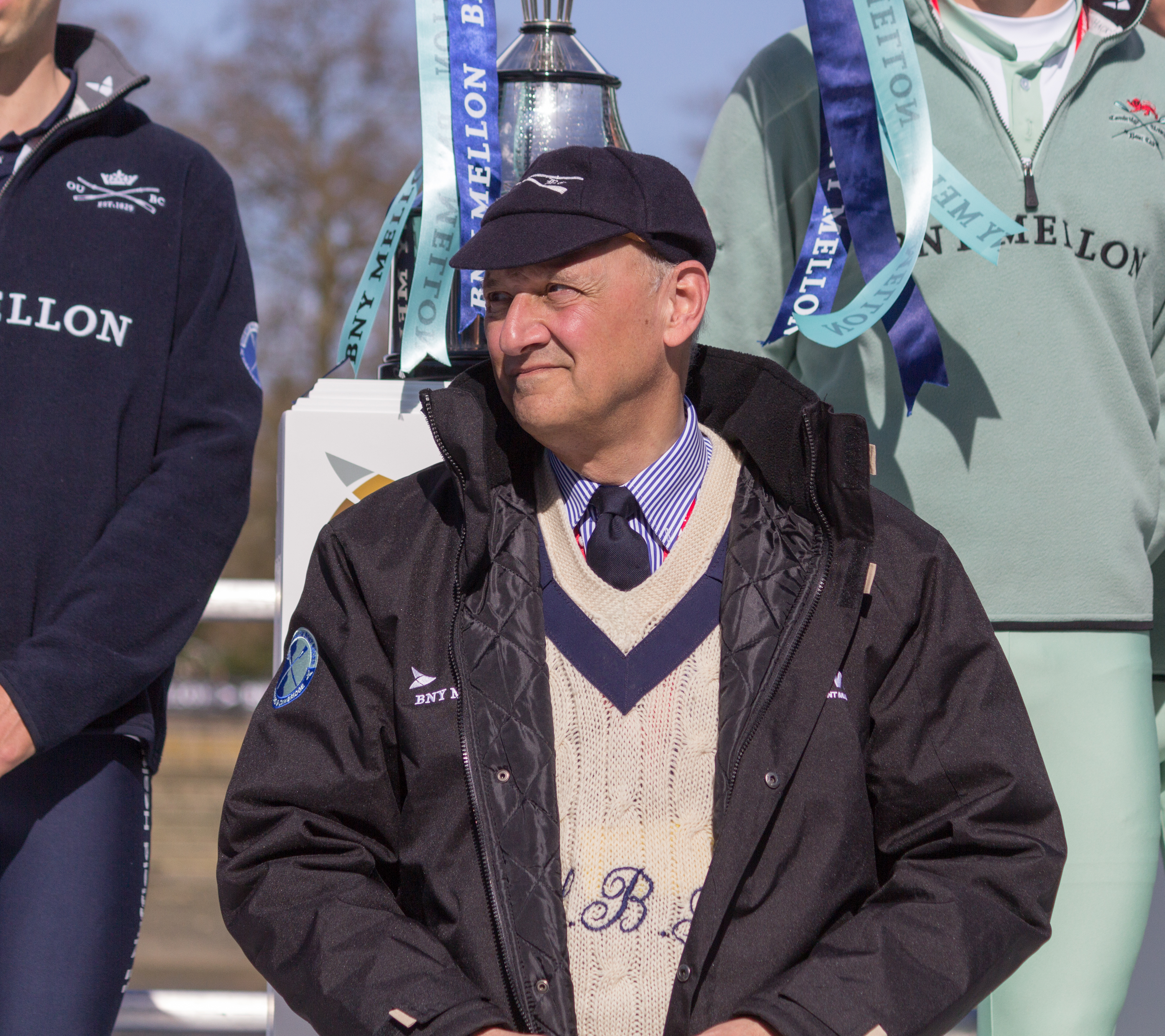
Boris Rankov (pictured in 2015) made the fifth of his six appearances for Oxford.

Seat	Oxford			Cambridge		
Seat	Name	College	Weight	Name	College	Weight
Bow	N. A. Conington (P)	Oriel	12 st 10 lb	P. St J. Brine	Lady Margaret Boat Club	12 st 9 lb
2	G. R. N. Holland	Oriel	13 st 12 lb	A. R. Knight	Clare	12 st 8 lb
3	H. E. Clay	Magdalen	14 st 2 lb	R. J. Stephens (P)	Emmanuel	13 st 12 lb
4	R. P. Yonge	New College	14 st 8 lb	N. J. Bliss	Corpus Christi	13 st 10 lb
5	N. B. Rankov	St Hugh's	14 st 12 lb	B. M. Philp	Downing	15 st 3 lb
6	S. J. L Foster	Pembroke	13 st 11 lb	C. D. Heard	Lady Margaret Boat Club	14 st 10 lb
7	A. K. Kirkpatrick	Oriel	14 st 8 lb	E M G Pearson	Jesus	12 st 1 lb
Stroke	R. C. Clay	New College	13 st 6 lb	S. A. Harris	Queens'	11 st 5 lb
Cox	S. Brown	Wadham	6 st 11 lb	I Bernstein	Emmanuel	7 st 2 lb
Source: (P) – Boat club president

== Race ==
The Championship Course along which the Boat Race is contested

River conditions were calm: Jim Railton of The Times described the course as "a smooth and flat Queen's highway from Putney to Mortlake." Michael Muir-Smith was the umpire for the race, for which Oxford were "heavily favoured". They won the toss and elected to start from the Surrey station. A good start from the Light Blues saw them a length ahead by Craven Cottage and passing the Mile Post one second ahead of Oxford. From Harrods Furniture Depository, Oxford fought their way back into contention with cox Brown forcing her counterpart Bernstein to steer towards the centre of the river. Both crews shot Hammersmith Bridge a second apart, with Oxford quickly gaining a length's lead and a clear water advantage. Cambridge were nine seconds down by Chiswick Steps and a further second behind at Barnes Bridge. Oxford passed the finishing post eleven seconds and 3 1/4 lengths ahead of Cambridge, in a time of 18 minutes 21 seconds, to record their seventh consecutive victory.

In the reserve race, Isis beat Goldie by 1 1/4 lengths and five seconds in a time of 18 minutes 43 seconds to record their third consecutive victory. In the 37th running of the Women's Boat Race, Cambridge triumphed, their first win in three years.

== Reaction ==
Rankov, who became the first rower to win five consecutive Boat Races (C. R. W. Tottenham had won five as a cox in the 1860s), admitted, "The beginning was all right. We expected them to be up on us before Hammersmith. But the burn we did there was exhausting. It was really hard just to keep in front for the rest of the way." Defeated Cambridge cox Bernstein said, "I can't wait to get back at them next year", while his stroke Simon Harris stated, "we will have six of this crew left next year. That's a good base". The Clays became the first twins to win a Boat Race.
