= The Boat Race 2020 =

Cancelled English university rowing race

- Date: 29 March 2020 (scheduled)

Men's race
- Winner: Cancelled
- Umpire: Sarah Winckless

Women's race
- Winner: Cancelled
- Umpire: Judith Packer

Reserves' races
- Men's winners: Cancelled
- Women's winners: Cancelled

The Boat Race 2020 was a side-by-side rowing race scheduled to take place on 29 March 2020. Held annually, The Boat Race is contested between crews from the universities of Oxford and Cambridge along a 4.2-mile (6.8 km) tidal stretch of the River Thames in south-west London. This would have been the 75th women's race and the 166th men's race, and for the fifth time in the history of the event, the men's, women's, and both reserves' races would have been held on the Tideway on the same day. Cambridge led the longstanding rivalry 84–80 and 44–30 in the men's and women's races, respectively.

The races were cancelled on 16 March 2020 as a result of the COVID-19 pandemic in the United Kingdom. Other than the 11 times the race was cancelled due to World War I and World War II, it was the first time the men's race had been cancelled since it has taken place annually from 1845. It was also the first cancellation of the women's race since its 1964 revival. It would have been the first time in the history of the event that both senior races had been umpired by women. The members of each crew were announced on the date that the race would have been conducted.

== Background ==
The Championship Course along which the races are conducted

The Boat Race is a side-by-side rowing competition between the University of Oxford (sometimes referred to as the "Dark Blues") and the University of Cambridge (sometimes referred to as the "Light Blues"). First held in 1829, the race takes place on the 4.2-mile (6.8 km) Championship Course, between Putney and Mortlake on the River Thames in south-west London. The rivalry is a major point of honour between the two universities; the race is followed throughout the United Kingdom and broadcast worldwide. Cambridge would have gone into the race as defending champions, having won the 2019 race by a margin of five lengths, and would have led overall with 84 victories to Oxford's 80 (excluding the 1877 race, a dead heat).

The autumn reception, where the previous year's losing team challenges the winners to a rematch, was held at the Chapel Down Gin Works in London on 20 November 2019. As Cambridge's women had won the previous year's race, it was Oxford's responsibility to offer the traditional challenge to the Cambridge University Women's Boat Club (CUWBC). To that end, Tina Christmann, President of Oxford University Women's Boat Club (OUWBC), laid down the gauntlet to Larkin Sayre, her Cambridge counterpart. Cambridge's victory in the men's race meant that Augustin Wambersie, President of Oxford University Boat Club (OUBC), challenged Freddie Davidson, President of Cambridge University Boat Club (CUBC).

The races were all scheduled to take place on 29 March 2020. The 75th women's race was to be umpired by Judith Packer, while the 166th men's race would have been officiated by Sarah Winckless. It would have been the first time in the history of the event that both senior races were to be umpired by women.

== Coaches ==
The Cambridge men's crew coaching team was led by their chief coach, Rob Baker, who had previously coached CUWBC to victories in both the 2017 and 2018 races, and CUBC to a win in 2019. He was assisted by Jordan Stanley, a New Zealander who was the former Director of Rowing at the University of St Andrews. Donald Legget, who rowed for the Light Blues in the 1963 and 1964 races was a supporting coach, along with coxing coach Henry Fieldman (who steered Cambridge in the 2013 race) and the medical officer Simon Owens. Sean Bowden was the chief coach for Oxford, having been responsible for the senior men's crew since 1997, winning 12 from 20 races. He was a former Great Britain Olympic coach and coached the Light Blues in the 1993 and 1994 Boat Races. His assistant coach was Brendan Gliddon, a South African who formerly coached under-23 and FISU teams for both South Africa and Great Britain. Alex Bowmer was OUBC's physical therapist.

Cambridge women's chief coach was Robert Weber, who joined Cambridge University before the 2019 race from Hamilton College in New York, where he was Head Rowing Coach and Associate Professor of Physical Education. He was assisted by Paddy Ryan and Katy Knowles. Oxford women's chief coach was Andy Nelder, who previously worked with Bowden and OUBC for eleven years. He was assisted by James Powell.

== Trials ==
Dates for the trials, where crews can simulate the race proper on the Championship Course, were announced on 5 December 2019.

=== Women ===
OUWBC'S trial took place on the Championship Course at 11:00 a.m. on 11 December 2019, between Morely and Brown, named after two of the Oxford crew who participated in and won the inaugural Women's Boat Race. The race, umpired by Judith Packer, took place in calm and cool conditions, with the crews making an even start. Morely, with the OUWBC president rowing at number seven, gradually took control of the race and sought to cross in front of Brown by Hammersmith Bridge. By Barnes Bridge, Morely was more than seven seconds ahead and held onto the lead to finish six seconds in front of Brown.

Cambridge's women's trial race was held on the Championship Course at 2.45 p.m. on 16 December 2019, between crews dominated by students of biology and medicine. As such the boats were named Actin and Myosin, the proteins which make the two muscle fibres that pull against each other in the human body. The CUWBC president, Larkin Sayre, rowed in Myosin who lost the toss and were on the Middlesex (north) side of the river. The race was conducted in overcast but smooth conditions and was umpired by Judith Packer. Actin took a slight lead by the Black Buoy, which they extended to be several lengths up on Myosin by Hammersmith Bridge. Myosin fought back before Chiswick Bridge to reduce the deficit, but Actin won by around two lengths.

=== Men ===
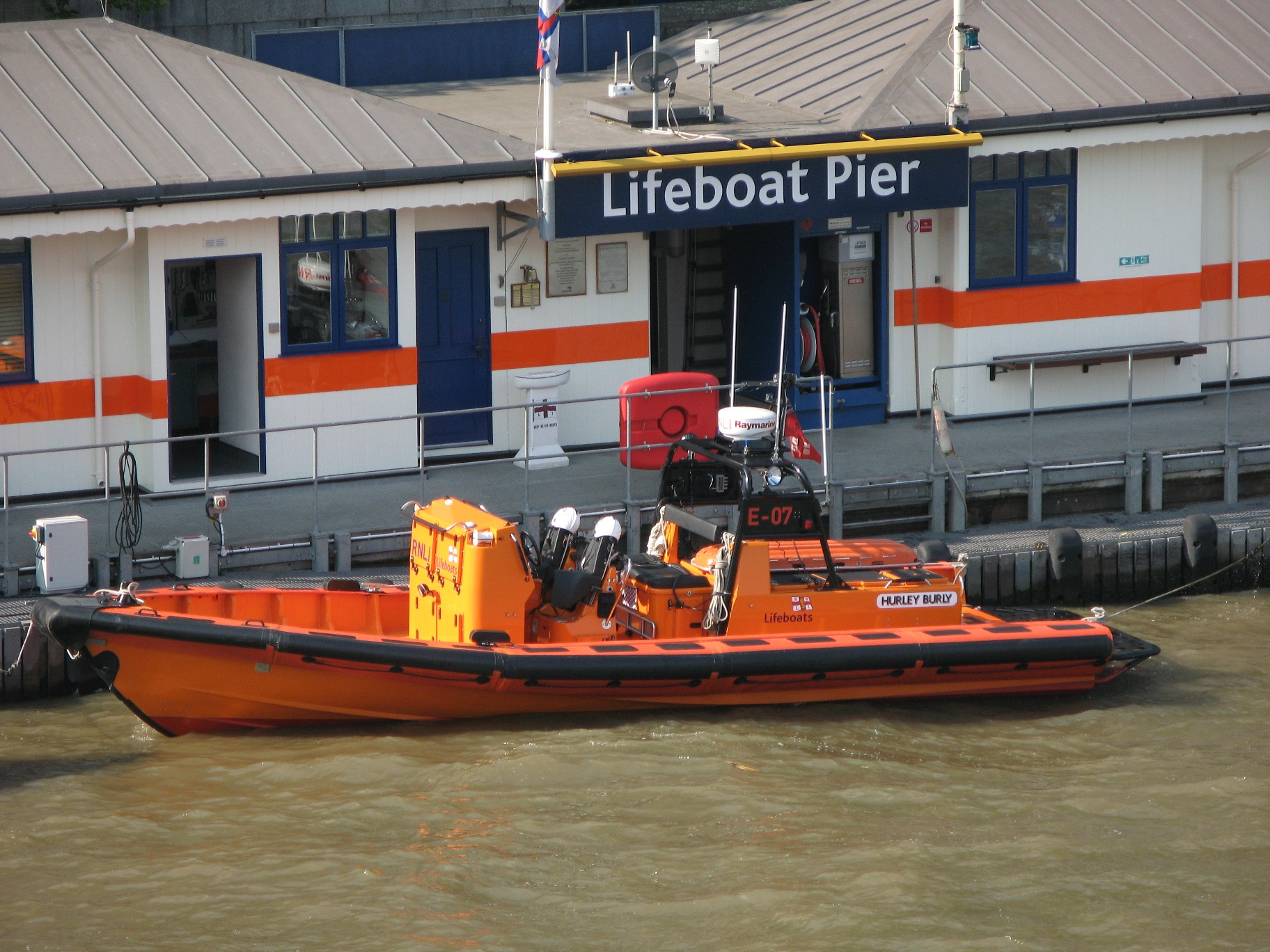
The RNLI's Hurley Burly after which Oxford's trial boats were named

Oxford's men's trial race was held on the Championship Course at noon on 11 December 2019, between Hurley and Burly, named after the Royal National Lifeboat Institution's lifeboat Hurley Burly. Umpired by Sarah Winckless, the race started evenly under scattered clouds and in calm water. Soon after, Hurley, stroked by the Oxford president Augustin Wambersie, took the lead and by Hammersmith Bridge had a clear water advantage. Burly were left in Hurley's wake as an uneventful race concluded.

The CUBC trial race took place on the Championship Course on 16 December 2019, between Electric and Boogaloo. In order to approximate the same tide conditions as the main race day, the trial was conducted at 3.45 p.m. which necessitated the use of lights on each of the boats. The crews made an even start under the umpiring of Sarah Winckless, but by the Mile Post, Electric held a quarter-length lead despite multiple warnings about their steering. Further warnings, for both crews, followed and Boogaloo took advantage of the Surrey bend to hold a three-quarter-length lead at St Paul's. As the advantage changed more to the Middlesex side, Electric fought back but Boogaloo responded in kind to end the race around a length clear.

== Buildup ==
The official fixtures to be raced in advance of The Boat Race were announced on 8 February 2020.

=== Women ===
The first race of the buildup for the Women's Boat Race was between CUWBC and the Amsterdam-based Nereus Rowing Club, which was to be held along the Thames in three pieces on 16 February 2020. In spite of the threat of disruption from Storm Dennis, the weather was mild. The umpire for the races was Richard Phelps, who issued several warnings to Cambridge during the first piece, where there was little to choose between the crews. By the town buoy, Cambridge held a quarter-length lead, which they extended to three-quarters by Craven Cottage, and were two lengths clear by the end of the race. The second piece commenced with a rolling start at Harrods Furniture Depository. Once again CUWBC were warned several times by the umpire but despite the bend in the river being in Nereus' favour, they only commanded a brief lead, before Cambridge drew back to lead by half a length at Chiswick Eyot, the finish for the second piece. The third race was abandoned due to injury in the Nereus crew. Cambridge's women were in action again the following week, this time a two-piece race in rough conditions against Oxford Brookes University Boat Club (OBUBC), umpired by Judith Packer. The first piece was from the finishing line to Chiswick Steps and saw OBUBC take a one-length lead early on, which they extended to a clear water advantage by Barnes Bridge. They pressed on to record a four-length victory over Cambridge in the first piece. The formula was repeated in the second race, with Brookes taking an early lead and extending it throughout to win by five lengths.

On 8 March, OUWBC faced Nereus in three pieces in rainy conditions, umpired by Claire Briegal. The first section, from Chiswick Steps to Hammersmith Bridge, saw Nereus take an early lead, but following a blade clash, Oxford took the lead to win by a length. In the second race, from Chiswick Steps to the Mile Post, Nereus once again made the early running but as Oxford took advantage of the bend in the river, they held a quarter-length lead over their Dutch opponents before pushing away from them to win by clear water. The third piece was raced from Hammersmith Bridge to Putney, and commenced with a rolling start. Nereus held an early lead though Oxford fought back to reduce the deficit to just a canvas by the end of the race. A week later, OUWBC faced a crew from the University of London Boat Club (ULBC) in a single piece along the Championship Course. To avoid extraneous contact between the crews in light of the coronavirus pandemic, the umpire Judith Packer held a "virtual" coin toss and briefing before the race commenced with ULBC taking the Surrey side of the river. OUWBC were half a length ahead by the Town Buoy and extended that to a length by Craven Cottage. As the crews passed below Hammersmith Bridge, OUWBC were a length of clear water ahead but some off-course steering gave ULBC an advantage and saw Oxford's lead cut. OUWBC passed the finishing line at Chiswick Steps with just under a half-length lead.

=== Men ===
OUBC commenced their buildup with a race in two pieces against OBUBC on 23 February 2020. As a result of high winds, the races were limited to a subsection of the Championship Course and were umpired by Sarah Winckless. OUBC took a three-quarter length lead by the Town Buoy over OBUBC who had hit rough water. Brookes reduced the deficit to a quarter of a length by Barn Elms, maintained to the Mile Post. At Harrods the crews were level and a push just before Hammersmith Bridge saw OUBC take a small lead which they extended until passing the finish line at St Paul's, more than a length ahead, the first defeat for OBUBC in British waters for three years. The second piece started at the London Rowing Club with Oxford Brookes a canvas ahead by the Town Buoy. Aggressive steering from OUBC and a mistake from OBUBC led to the crews becoming level. A wave partially filled the OUBC boat allowing Brookes to take advantage and pull away to win the second piece by two lengths.

CUBC's first outing in the buildup to the main race was a two-piece fixture against OBUBC on 1 March, umpired by Winckless. The first race started from the University Stone and early on both crews were warned following a series of blade clashes. Brookes held a one-third-length lead by the Town Buoy but Cambridge pulled back onto level terms by Craven Cottage. A further blade clash before the Mile Post saw OBUBC take a lead of half a length, which they extended to two lengths by the time they finished the first piece at Chiswick Steps. The second race was held on the same stretch of the Thames, in reverse, and aggressive steering from OBUBC saw them holding a half-length on the approach to Barnes Bridge before CUBC restored parity under the bridge. OBUBC reduced the CUBC lead to a canvas by Dukes Meadow and made a final push to take a quarter-length victory over the Light Blues.

== Cancellation ==
On 16 March 2020, it was announced that the event was cancelled as a result of the 2019–20 coronavirus pandemic and following Prime Minister Boris Johnson's announcement that all non-essential travel should be avoided. Other than as a result of war, it was the first time the men's race has been cancelled since it has taken place annually from 1845. It was also the first cancellation of the women's race since its 1964 revival. Robert Gillespie, Chairman of The Boat Race Company Limited, said that it "was not an easy decision", and added that "the public good far outweighs all other considerations".

Instead of the race, members of the CUWBC squad participated in Row Britannia, an indoor rowing challenge to raise money for charity. Mixed teams of 8 participants representing Oxford and Cambridge, including Olympic and Paralympic rowers, contested a 6.8km virtual boat race on 13 June 2020, with individual rowers from each team completing 500m on an ergometer in relays, to raise funds for the charity Power2Inspire.

== Crews ==
Despite the cancellation, on 29 March 2020, both the men's and women's senior and reserve crews who would have competed were announced.

=== Women ===
Seat	Oxford			Cambridge		
Seat	Name	Nationality	College	Name	Nationality	College
Bow	Renée Koolschijn	Dutch	Keble	Abba Parker	American	Emmanuel
2	Kaitlyn Dennis	Canadian	Green Templeton	Sarah Portsmouth	British	Newnham
3	Isobel Dodds	British	Hertford	Bronya Sykes	British	Gonville and Caius
4	Georgina Grant	British	Harris Manchester	Sophie Paine	British/Bahamian	Wolfson
5	Martha Birtles	British	Mansfield	Anouschka Fenley	British	Lucy Cavendish
6	Amelia Standing	British	St Anne's	Caoimhe Dempsey	Irish	Newnham
7	Tina Christmann (P)	German/Italian	Worcester	Patricia Smith	British	Christ's
Stroke	Katherine Maitland	British	St Hughs	Larkin Sayre (P)	British/American	Emmanuel
Cox	Costi Levy	British/Italian	Exeter	Dylan Whitaker	British	King's
(P) – Boat club president

=== Men ===
Seat	Oxford			Cambridge		
Seat	Name	Nationality	College	Name	Nationality	College
Bow	Achim Harzheim	German	Oriel	Andrew Goff	Irish	Peterhouse
2	Hal Frigaard	British/Australian	Oriel	Jonty Page	British	Pembroke
3	Charlie Buchanan	British	Pembroke	Ben Freeman	British/German	Peterhouse
4	Augustin Wambersie (P)	Belgian	St Catherine's	Phil Horton	British	Girton
5	Tobias Schroder	Estonian/British	Magdalen	Callum Sullivan	British	Downing
6	Jean-Philippe Dufour	Swiss/Canadian	Lincoln	Freddie Davidson (P)	British	Emmanuel
7	Caspar Jopling	British	Mansfield	James Bernard	American	St Edmund's
Stroke	Felix Drinkall	British	Lady Margaret Hall	Arthur Doyle	British	Girton
Cox	Oliver Perry	British	Lady Margaret Hall	Charlie Marcus	British	Trinity
(P) – Boat club president
