= The Boat Race 2014 =

160th Boat Race
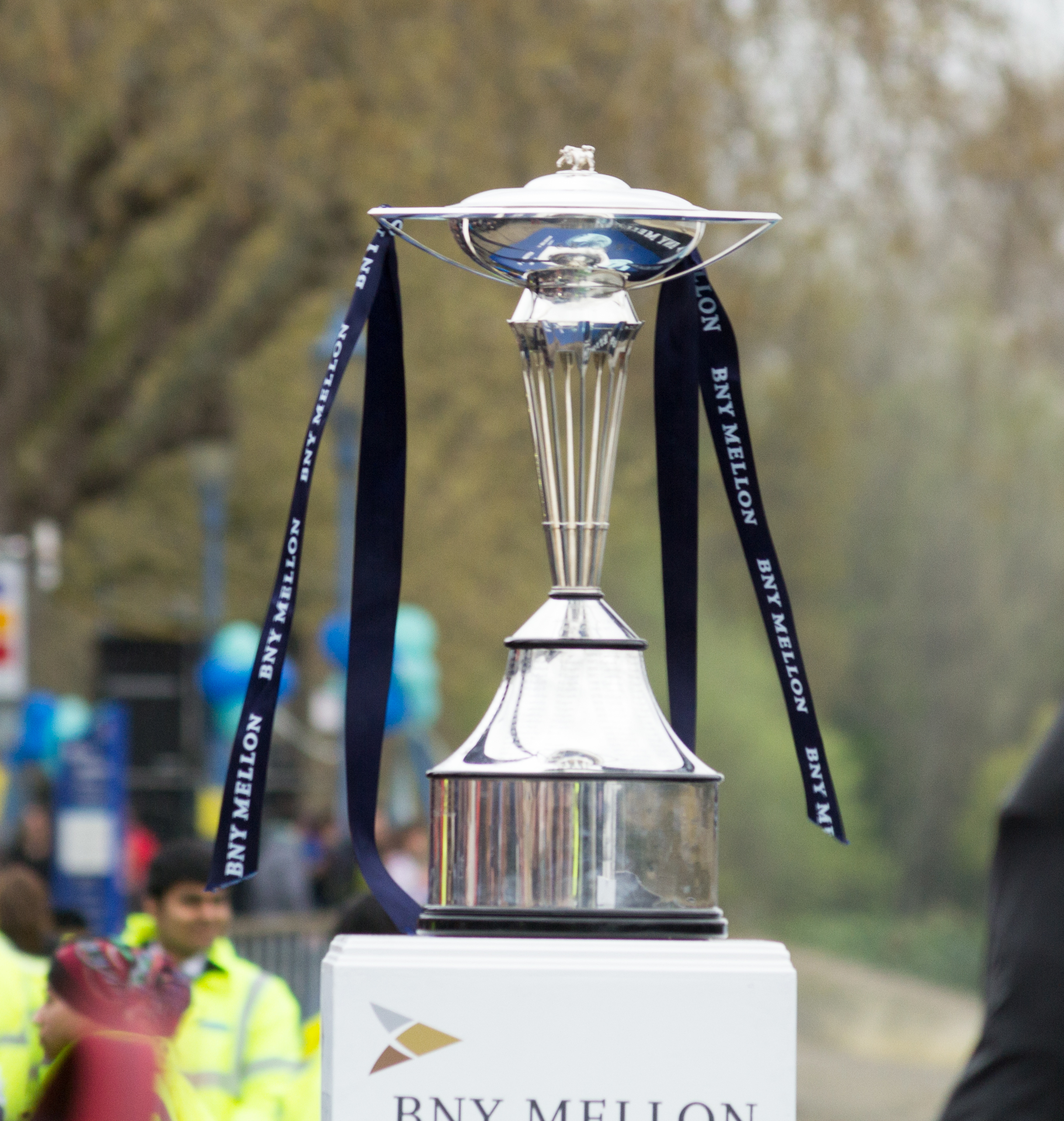
- The 2014 trophy on display
- Date: 6 April 2014
- Winner: Oxford
- Margin of victory: 11 lengths
- Winning time: 18 minutes 36 seconds
- Overall record (Cambridge–Oxford): 81–78
- Umpire: Richard Phelps (Cambridge)

Other races
- Reserve winner: Isis
- Women's winner: Oxford

The 160th Boat Race took place on 6 April 2014. Following a clash of oars which broke one of the Cambridge boat's rigger backstays, Oxford won the race by 11 lengths, the largest margin of victory since 1973.

In the reserve race Oxford's Isis beat Cambridge's Goldie, while Oxford won the Women's Boat Race.

== Background ==
The Boat Race is an annual rowing eight competition between the University of Oxford and the University of Cambridge. First held in 1829, the competition is a 4.2-mile (6.8 km) race along The Championship Course on the River Thames in southwest London. The rivalry is a major point of honour between the two universities and followed throughout the United Kingdom and worldwide. Oxford went into the race as reigning champions, having beaten Cambridge by 1 1/2 lengths in the previous year's race. However Cambridge held the overall lead, with 81 victories to Oxford's 77 (excluding the "dead heat" of 1877).

The first Women's Boat Race took place in 1927, but did not become an annual fixture until the 1960s. Until 2014, the contest was conducted as part of the Henley Boat Races, but as of the 2015 race, it is held on the River Thames, on the same day as the men's main and reserve races. The reserve race, contested between Oxford's Isis boat and Cambridge's Goldie boat has been held since 1965. It usually takes place on the Tideway, prior to the main Boat Race.

== Crews ==
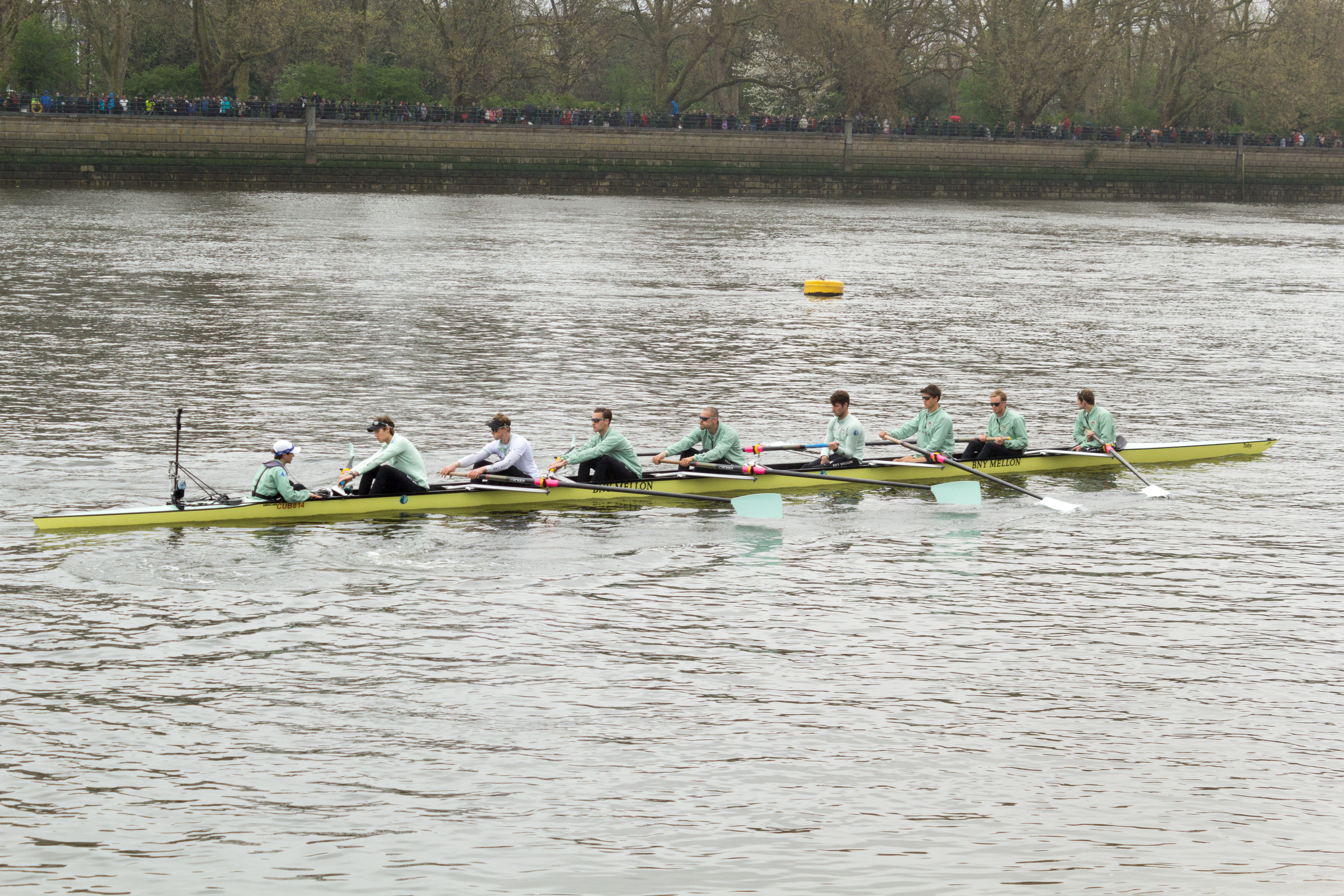
The Cambridge boat

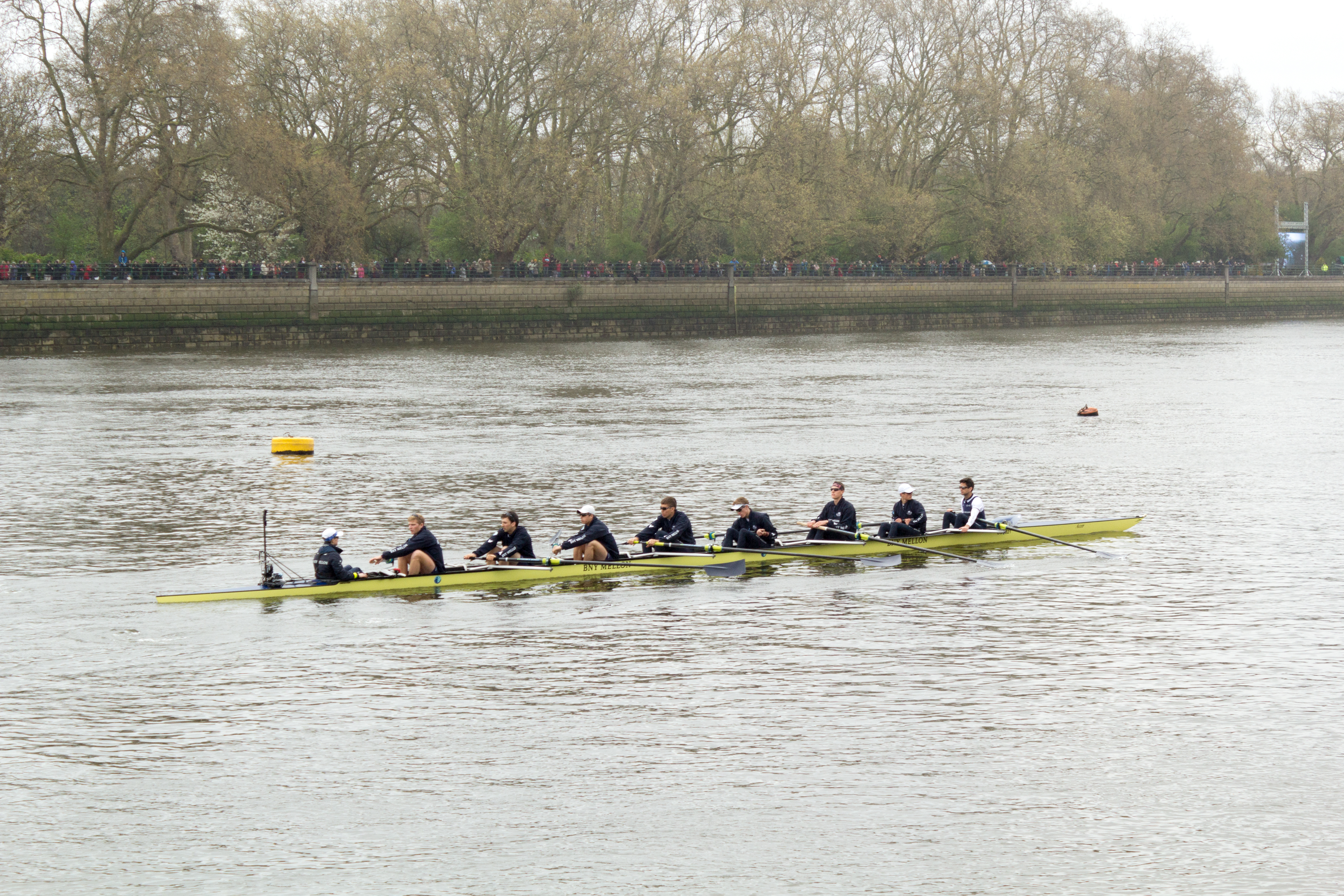
The Oxford boat

The Cambridge crew (known as the "Light Blues") had a 5-kilogram (11 lb) per person advantage, but Oxford (the "Dark Blues") were the pre-race favourites. The Cambridge crew was 24 years old on average, while Oxford averaged 26 years. The Oxford crew featured three British rowers, two Canadians, two New Zealanders, an American, and one member with dual Canadian-American citizenship. The Cambridge crew consisted of three British rowers, four Americans, an Australian, and a German. Three of the Oxford rowers had competed in the Olympics.

Seat	Oxford				Cambridge			
Seat	Name	College	Height	Weight	Name	College	Height	Weight
Bow	Storm Uru	Keble	190 cm (6 ft 3 in)	80.4 kg	Mike Thorp	Homerton	194 cm (6 ft 4 1/2 in)	88.0 kg
2	Tom Watson	Brasenose	181 cm (5 ft 11 1/2 in)	72.1 kg	Luke Juckett	St Edmund's	186 cm (6 ft 1 in)	84.2 kg
3	Karl Hudspith	St Peter's	199.5 cm (6 ft 6 1/2 in)	91 kg	Ivo Dawkins	Gonville and Caius	203 cm (6 ft 8 in)	89.2 kg
4	Tom Swartz	Christ Church	189 cm (6 ft 2 1/2 in)	81.2 kg	Steve Dudek (P)	St Edmund's	203 cm (6 ft 8 in)	101.0 kg
5	Malcolm Howard (P)	Oriel	200 cm (6 ft 6 1/2 in)	108.2 kg	Helge Gruetjen	Magdalene	204 cm (6 ft 8 1/2 in)	99.6 kg
6	Michael di Santo	Trinity	184 cm (6 ft 1/2 in)	89.2 kg	Matthew Jackson	St Edmund's	198 cm (6 ft 6 in)	94.4 kg
7	Sam O'Connor	Christ Church	185 cm (6 ft 1 in)	88.8 kg	Joshua Hooper	St Edmund's	194 cm (6 ft 4 1/2 in)	92.0 kg
Stroke	Constantine Louloudis	Trinity	190 cm (6 ft 3 in)	93.6 kg	Henry Hoffstot	Hughes Hall	195 cm (6 ft 5 in)	89.6 kg
Cox	Laurence Harvey	St Hugh's	174 cm (5 ft 8 1/2 in)	54.8 kg	Ian Middleton	Queens'	173 cm (5 ft 8 in)	53.6 kg
Source: (P) – Boat club president

== Race description ==
At race time, conditions were mild with an overcast sky. A crowd of 250,000 people were in attendance. It was sponsored by BNY Mellon and thus officially titled "The BNY Mellon Boat Race". Oxford won the coin toss and elected to start from the southern bank of the Thames. In the first five minutes of the race, the lead changed hands three times. First Oxford, then Cambridge drifted towards the centre of the river and were warned by the umpire. Oxford turned away, but before Cambridge had time to do so, the two boats bumped. The clash caused a rowing error by Cambridge's Luke Juckett, as he was bucked from his seat and nearly thrown overboard. He did not recover until five strokes later. Oxford took advantage, rowing out to a significant lead with two-thirds of the course to go, and steadily increased the gap. Cambridge were unable to respond and in the end Oxford won by 11 lengths, the largest margin of victory since 1973.

Oxford finished with a time of 18 minutes, 36 seconds; this was 32 seconds faster than Cambridge. It was their fifth victory in the last seven years, and tenth in the last fifteen. Stroke Constantine Louloudis was a member of a victorious Oxford crew for the third time (2011, 2013 and 2014 – he competed in the Olympics instead in 2012). Cambridge now lead the overall series 81–78. At the finish, the Oxford crew threw their cox, Laurence Harvey, into the water in celebration. After the race, Cambridge appealed the result but umpire Richard Phelps ruled that the bump occurred on neutral water and that neither crew should be penalised. Oxford's Sam O’Connor called it "very minor, one of the smallest clashes I’ve ever had". Juckett said the clash broke his rigger and made it "really hard to keep rowing", but added that "clashing is part of the race."

In the reserve race, Oxford's Isis beat Cambridge's Goldie. Earlier, Oxford also won the women's race.

== Reaction ==
O'Connor said he was confident Oxford would have won even without the clash. Oxford Boat Club president Malcolm Howard remarked "You cannot help but feel for the two-seat of Cambridge, it’s tough." Cambridge Boat Club president Steve Dudek called it "a frustrating way to lose ... I would never wish that on anyone." BBC commentator Tom James remarked it was "great for British rowing" that Louloudis won the race for the third time.

An estimated 130 million people worldwide watched the event on television.
