= Women's Boat Race 1983 =

38th Women's Boat Race
- Date: 26 March 1983
- Winner: Cambridge
- Margin of victory: 11 seconds
- Winning time: 6 minutes 29 seconds
- Overall record (Cambridge–Oxford): 25–13

The 38th Women's Boat Race took place on 26 March 1983. The contest was between crews from the Universities of Oxford and Cambridge and held as part of the Henley Boat Races along a two-kilometre course.

== Background ==
The first Women's Boat Race was conducted on The Isis in 1927.

== Race ==
Cambridge won by 11 seconds in a time of 6 minutes and 29 seconds.

== See also ==
- The Boat Race 1983
