= Women's Boat Race 1993 =

48th Women's Boat Race
- Date: 21 March 1993
- Winner: Cambridge
- Margin of victory: 4½ lengths
- Winning time: 6 minutes 10 seconds

The 48th Women's Boat Race took place on 21 March 1993. The contest was between crews from the Universities of Oxford and Cambridge and held as part of the Henley Boat Races along a two-kilometre course.

== Background ==
The first Women's Boat Race was conducted on The Isis in 1927.

== Race ==
Oxford were stroked by Phoebe White, an Under-23 international sculler. Oxford initially took the lead but were overtaken by Cambridge after a minute who were warned by the umpire for taking Oxford's water. Cambridge increased their lead and won by 4 1/2 lengths in a time of 6 minutes 10 seconds taking the cumulative wins to 31 to Cambridge and 17 for Oxford. The Cambridge reserve boat won by 1 1/2 lengths in a time of 6 minutes 22 seconds taking the cumulative wins to 16 for Cambridge and 6 for Oxford.
