= Women's Boat Race 1994 =

49th Women's Boat Race
- Date: 20 March 1994
- Winner: Cambridge
- Margin of victory: 1 length
- Winning time: 6 minutes 11 seconds

The 49th Women's Boat Race took place on 20 March 1994. The contest was between crews from the Universities of Oxford and Cambridge and held as part of the Henley Boat Races along a two-kilometre course.

== Background ==
The first Women's Boat Race was conducted on The Isis in 1927.

== Race ==
Cambridge won by one length in a time of 6 minutes 11 seconds.
