= Women's Boat Race 1939 =

8th Women's Boat Race
- Date: 11 March 1939
- Winner: Oxford
- Margin of victory: 5 lengths
- Winning time: 4 minutes 59 2/5 seconds
- Overall record (Cambridge–Oxford): 2–6

The 8th Women's Boat Race took place on 11 March 1939. The contest was between crews from the Universities of Oxford and Cambridge and held on the River Thames.

== Background ==
The first Women's Boat Race was conducted on The Isis in 1927.

== Race ==
The race took place along a 0.75-mile (1.21 km) stretch of river between Medley Bridge and Godstow along the Upper River Thames.

The contest was won by Oxford by five lengths in a time of 4 minutes 59.4 seconds. The victory took the overall record in the competition to 6–2 in their favour.

== See also ==
- The Boat Race 1939
