= Women's Boat Race 1941 =

9th Women's Boat Race
- Date: 8 March 1941
- Winner: Oxford
- Margin of victory: 6 seconds
- Overall record (Cambridge–Oxford): 2–7

The 8th Women's Boat Race took place on 8 March 1941. The contest was between crews from the Universities of Oxford and Cambridge and held on the River Thames.

== Background ==
The first Women's Boat Race was conducted on The Isis in 1927. No race took place the previous year.

== Race ==
The contest was won by Oxford by six seconds. The victory took the overall record in the competition to 7–2 in their favour.
