= Women's Boat Race 1981 =

36th Women's Boat Race
- Date: 29 March 1981
- Winner: Oxford
- Margin of victory: 1 second
- Winning time: 6 minutes 12 seconds
- Overall record (Cambridge–Oxford): 23–13

The 36th Women's Boat Race took place on 29 March 1981. The contest was between crews from the Universities of Oxford and Cambridge and held as part of the Henley Boat Races along a two-kilometre course.

== Background ==
The first Women's Boat Race was conducted on The Isis in 1927.

== Race ==
Oxford won by one second in a time of 6 minutes and 12 seconds.

== See also ==
- The Boat Race 1981
