= Women's Boat Race 1930 =

3rd Women's Boat Race
- Winner: Cambridge
- Overall record (Cambridge–Oxford): 2–1

The 3rd Women's Boat Race took place in 1930. The contest was between crews from the Universities of Oxford and Cambridge and held on the River Thames.

== Background ==
The first Women's Boat Race was conducted on The Isis in 1927. This was not solely a race in the years up to 1935, the two boats were not on the river together and were judged on both their speed and their "steadiness, finish, rhythm and other matters of style".

== Race ==
The contest was won by Cambridge, with the victory taking the overall record in the competition to 2–1 in their favour.

== See also ==
- The Boat Race 1930
