= Women's Boat Race 2013 =

Rowing competition between Oxford University and Cambridge University in 2013

68th Women's Boat Race
- Date: 24 March 2013
- Winner: Oxford
- Margin of victory: 1 and 3/4 lengths
- Winning time: 7 minutes 11 seconds
- Overall record (Cambridge–Oxford): 41–27

The 68th Women's Boat Race took place on 24 March 2013. The race, between crews representing Oxford University Women's Boat Club and Cambridge University Women's Boat Club, was conducted as part of the Henley Boat Races. It took place on a 2 km (1.2 mi) stretch of water on 2012 Olympic venue Dorney Lake. Cambridge were the heavier of the crews and consisted of an all-British crew, while Oxford's boat included a Hungarian rower and an American cox. Oxford won the race by one and three-quarter lengths in a time of 7 minutes 11 seconds, their first win since the 2011 race. The victory took the overall record in the event to 41–27 in Cambridge's favour.

== Background ==
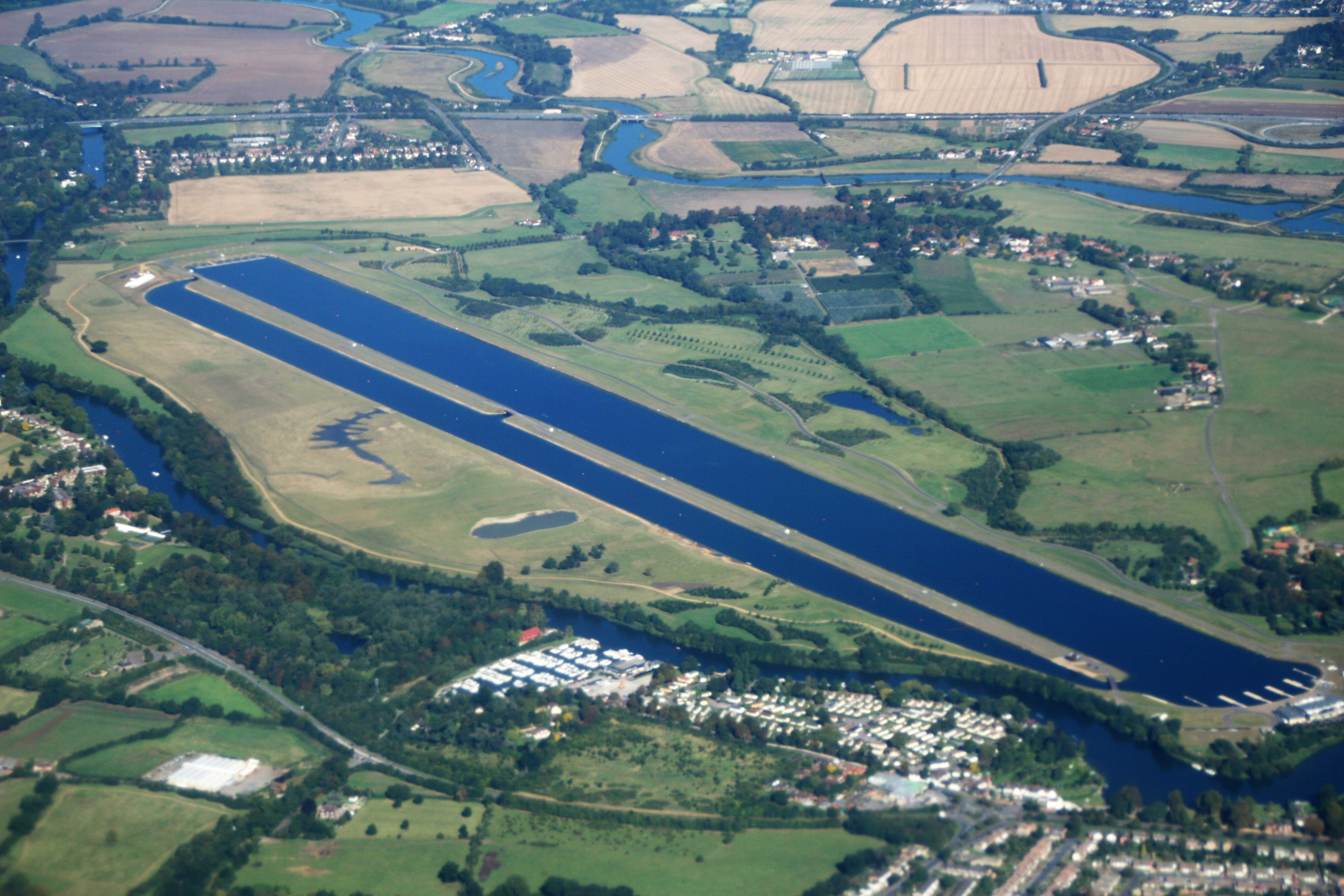
The 2013 race was held on Dorney Lake which had hosted the rowing events of the 2012 Summer Olympics.

The Women's Boat Race is a side-by-side rowing competition between Oxford University Women's Boat Club (OUWBC) and the Cambridge University Women's Boat Club (CUWBC) that has taken place since 1927. It was conducted as part of the Henley Boat Races, which for 2013 was hosted at the 2012 Summer Olympics venue of Dorney Lake in Buckinghamshire instead of the traditional straight course at Henley-on-Thames. Strong winds and stream conditions on the River Thames had precipitated the move to the Olympic venue. Cambridge went into the race as champions, having won the previous year's race by one quarter of a length, and led 41–26 overall. The race was sponsored by Newton Investment Management, a subsidiary of The Bank of New York Mellon, for the third successive year.

Cambridge were led by Rob Baker who had previously coached Goldie to victory in 2006 and 2007. Baker was assisted by British Olympic quadruple sculls silver medallist Annie Vernon. Oxford's coach was Canadian former Olympic and University trainer Christine Wilson. She was assisted by British Olympic rower Natasha Page who was part of the women's eights that came fifth in both the 2008 and 2012 Summer Olympics.

== Crews ==
Trials for the crews were held in December 2012. Oxford's trial boats raced at Henley and were named Quick and Easy while Cambridge's trials took place at Dorney Lake with boats named Gin and Tonic.

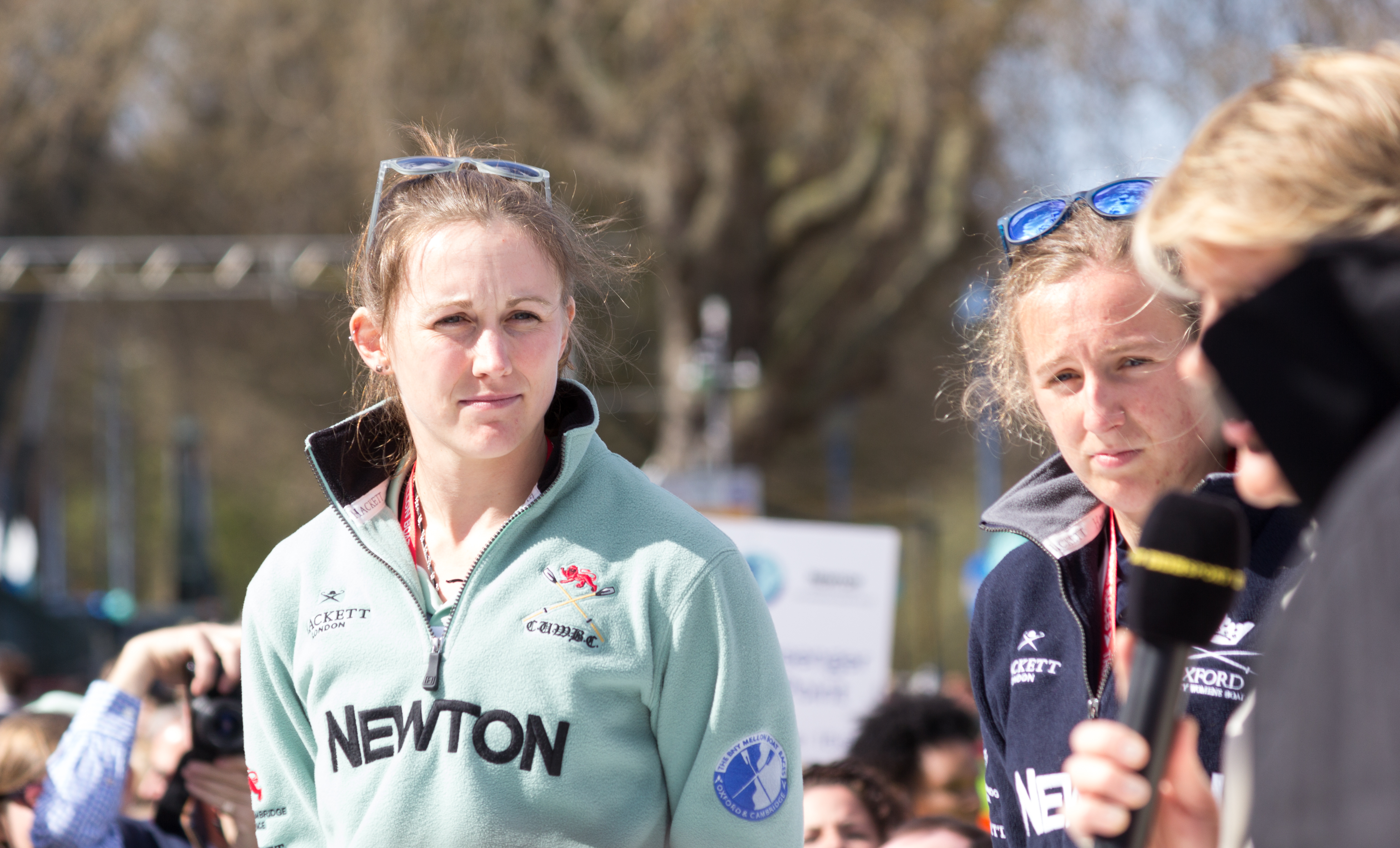
Cambridge's bow Caroline Reid (left) and Oxford number seven Anastasia Chitty (pictured in 2015)

The weigh-in, held on 4 March 2013, took place alongside the men for the first time in the history of the event. It was also the first time the weights of the female crews were made public. The Cambridge crew weighed an average of 11 st 0 lb 10 oz (70.0 kg), 4 lb 3 oz (1.9 kg) per rower more than their opponents. Oxford saw two rowers return to the crew in number three Mary Foord-Weston and number six Harriet Keane, both of whom had participated in the 2012 race. Oxford's boat club president Bridget Fryer was forced to withdraw from the race through injury. Cambridge's crew included three rowers with Boat Race experience, in bow Caroline Reid, number two Faye Sandford (who was earning her third Blue for CUWBC) and stroke Holly Game. Cambridge's boat club president Helena Schofield did not participate in the event, and instead rowed for the women's reserve boat Blondie.

CUWBC's cox Esther Momcilovic had previously steered the Cambridge reserve boat Blondie, while Oxford's crew included three former Osiris participants in Amy Varney, Keane and cox Katie Apfelbaum. Cambridge's crew was entirely British while Oxford's included Hungarian Mariann Novak at bow, British/Germans Alice Carrington-Windo at two and Maxie Scheske at stroke, and American Apfelbaum.

Seat	Cambridge				Oxford			
Seat	Name	College	Nationality	Weight	Name	College	Nationality	Weight
Bow	Caroline Reid	Jesus	British	10 st 1 lb 15 oz	Mariann Novak	Keble	Hungarian	9 st 5 lb 13 oz
2	Fay Sandford	Gonville and Caius	British	12 st 0 lb 6 oz	Alice Carrington-Windo	Kellogg	British/German	10 st 11 lb 10 oz
3	Melissa Wilson	Gonville and Caius	British	12 st 1 lb 11 oz	Mary Foord-Weston	Merton	British	10 st 11 lb 10 oz
4	Jessica Denman	Clare	British	11 st 2 lb 8 oz	Joanna Lee	Lady Margaret Hall	British	11 st 2 lb 1 oz
5	Vicky Shaw	Selwyn	British	10 st 9 lb 14 oz	Amy Varney	St Edmund Hall	British	11 st 10 lb 0 oz
6	Claire Watkins	Clare	British	10 st 13 lb 13 oz	Harriet Keane	St Anne's	British	10 st 5 lb 7 oz
7	Emily Day	Emmanuel	British	10 st 0 lb 9 oz	Anastasia Chitty	Pembroke	British	10 st 9 lb 0 oz
Stroke	Holly Game	Girton	British	11 st 2 lb 1 oz	Maxie Scheske	Magdalen	British/German	9 st 6 lb 4 oz
Cox	Esther Momcilovic	Clare	British	7 st 13 lb 8 oz	Katie Apfelbaum	St Antony's	American	8 st 5 lb 4 oz
Source: (P) – boat club president (Oxford's Bridget Fryer and Cambridge's Helena Schofield acted as non-rowing presidents)

== Race ==
Cambridge won the toss and selected the more sheltered side of the course. The race started at 3:00 p.m. on 24 March 2013. Cambridge made the quicker start and led by a few feet after ten strokes. They were half a length ahead after 250 metres (270 yd), out-rating Oxford by fours strokes per minute. OUWBC's longer strokes enabled them to cope with the "choppy" conditions and at the 750-metre (820 yd) mark they began to catch the Cambridge boat, getting level by the 1,250-metre (1,370 yd) mark. Pushing on, Oxford pulled away to win by one and three-quarter lengths in a time of 7 minutes 11 seconds, the slowest winning time since the 2001 race. It was Oxford's first win since the 2011 race but their fifth win in the last six events. The victory took the overall record in the event to 41–27 in Cambridge's favour.

Oxford's Foord-Weston said the conditions were "pretty grim" but their training at Dorney during the week running up to the race had prepared them for the "horrible winds". Cambridge's number seven, Emily Day, said "it was pretty windy ... we had the race of our lives ... there's nothing we could have done that we didn't do."

== See also ==
- The Boat Race 2013
