= Women's Boat Race 1982 =

37th Women's Boat Race
- Date: 21 March 1982
- Winner: Cambridge
- Margin of victory: 4 seconds
- Overall record (Cambridge–Oxford): 24–13

The 37th Women's Boat Race took place on 21 March 1982. The contest was between crews from the Universities of Oxford and Cambridge and held as part of the Henley Boat Races along a two-kilometre course.

== Background ==
The first Women's Boat Race was conducted on The Isis in 1927. The 1982 race was the first in the history of the event to include a male participant, in Oxford's cox Phillip Edwards. BBC One broadcast a feature on Oxford 's training on 18 March, three days before the race.

== Crews ==
| Seat | Oxford | | Cambridge | |
| Seat | Name | College | Name | College |
|---|---|---|---|---|
| Bow | M. Jollands | St Catherine's | P. Nock | Downing |
| 2 | F. Whiting | St Hugh's | H. Brown | Newnham |
| 3 | M. Esslin | Keble | S. Barnard | Robinson |
| 4 | C. Wardle | Somerville | S. Van Kleef | Fitzwilliam |
| 5 | S. Talbot | New College | K. Panter | Downing |
| 6 | P. Rowlands | Lady Margaret Hall | T. McRae | Darwin |
| 7 | S. Davies | Jesus | K. Marwick | Girton |
| Stroke | F. Freckleton | Somerville | H. Burnett | Homerton |
| Cox | P. Edwards | Wolfson | G. Godbold | Sidney Sussex |

== Coaches ==
Oxford: M. Rosewell, A. Truswell, R. Emerton, A. Walsh.

Cambridge: R. Wiggin, J. Sutherland-Smith, N. Burnet*, S. Jones, J. Gleave, N. Casey, N Kirkby*.

*Co-Chief Coach

== Race ==
Cambridge won by four seconds.

== See also ==
- The Boat Race 1982
