= Women's Boat Race 1980 =

35th Women's Boat Race
- Date: 23 March 1980
- Winner: Oxford
- Margin of victory: 2 1/2 lengths
- Overall record (Cambridge–Oxford): 23–12

The 35th Women's Boat Race took place on 23 March 1980. The contest was between crews from the Universities of Oxford and Cambridge and held as part of the Henley Boat Races along a two-kilometre course.

== Background ==
The first Women's Boat Race was conducted on The Isis in 1927.

== Race ==
Oxford won by two and a half lengths.

== See also ==
- The Boat Race 1980
