= Women's Boat Race 1973 =

28th Women's Boat Race
- Date: 12 March 1973
- Winner: Cambridge
- Margin of victory: 2 1/2 lengths
- Winning time: 4 minutes 7 seconds
- Overall record (Cambridge–Oxford): 18–10

The 28th Women's Boat Race took place on 12 March 1973. The contest was between crews from the Universities of Oxford and Cambridge and held on the River Cam.

== Background ==
The first Women's Boat Race was conducted on The Isis in 1927.

== Race ==
The race took place on a 1,200-yard (1,097 m) stretch of the River Cam between the Stop to Peter's Posts. The contest was won by Cambridge by two and a half lengths in a time of 4 minutes 7 seconds. The victory took the overall record in the competition to 18–10 in their favour. Vicky Markham of Newnham College, the Cambridge University Women's Boat Club president was thrown into the Cam in a traditional celebration.

== See also ==
- The Boat Race 1973
