= Women's Boat Race 1974 =

29th Women's Boat Race
- Date: 14 March 1974
- Winner: Cambridge
- Margin of victory: 1/2 length
- Winning time: 4 minutes 8 seconds
- Overall record (Cambridge–Oxford): 19–10

The 29th Women's Boat Race took place on 14 March 1974. The contest was between crews from the Universities of Oxford and Cambridge and held on The Isis.

== Background ==
The first Women's Boat Race was conducted on The Isis in 1927.

== Race ==
The race took place on a 1,000-metre (1,094 yd) stretch of The Isis. The contest was won by Cambridge by half a length in a time of 4 minutes 8 seconds. The victory took the overall record in the competition to 19–10 in their favour.

== See also ==
- The Boat Race 1974
