= Women's Boat Race 1935 =

5th Women's Boat Race
- Date: 16 March 1935
- Winner: Oxford
- Margin of victory: 6 seconds
- Winning time: 4 minutes 8.5 seconds
- Overall record (Cambridge–Oxford): 2–3
- Umpire: R. W. G. Holdsworth (Oxford); H. A. Barry (Barnes Rowing Club)

The 5th Women's Boat Race took place on 16 March 1935. The contest was between crews from the Universities of Oxford and Cambridge and held on the River Thames between Kew Railway Bridge and the Quintin Boat Club boathouse. It was won by Oxford by six seconds.

== Background ==
The first Women's Boat Race was conducted on The Isis in 1927. Umpires included R. W. G. Holdsworth of Brasenose College, Oxford, who had rowed in 1931 Boat Race, and H. A. Barry from Barnes Rowing Club.

== Crews ==
Cambridge were represented by Newnham while Oxford saw a mix of St Hugh's and Oxford Home-Students.

Seat	Oxford	Cambridge
Bow	A. Dalahayes Jones	B. Mc. N. Thorn
2	L. M. Dillon	B. Poole
3	J. Strothers	T. O. B. Johnson
4	J. Hymans	M. K. Walker
5	W. Shaw	K. de Lempicka
6	A. Demery	D. M. Whitehead
7	H. Guest	K. L. Priestly
Stroke	S. Harrison	M. A. L. Morant
Cox	M. Pearson	B. R. Hamilton

== Race ==
The race was held between Kew Railway Bridge and the Quintin Boat Club boathouse at Chiswick.

Disallowed from rowing side by side, Oxford's boat was sent off first, with the Cambridge boat following thirty seconds later. The contest was won by Oxford by six seconds in a time of 4 minutes 8.5 seconds. The victory took the overall record in the competition to 3–2 in their favour.

== See also ==
- The Boat Race 1935
