= Women's Boat Race 1984 =

39th Women's Boat Race
- Date: 24 March 1984
- Winner: Cambridge
- Margin of victory: 4 1/2 lengths
- Overall record (Cambridge–Oxford): 26–13

The 39th Women's Boat Race took place on 24 March 1984. The contest was between crews from the Universities of Oxford and Cambridge and held as part of the Henley Boat Races along a two-kilometre course.

== Background ==
The first Women's Boat Race was conducted on The Isis in 1927.

== Race ==
Cambridge won by four and a half lengths.

== See also ==
- The Boat Race 1984
