= Women's Boat Race 2011 =

66th Women's Boat Race
- Date: 27 March 2011
- Winner: Oxford
- Margin of victory: 1 length
- Winning time: 6 minutes 24 seconds
- Overall record (Cambridge–Oxford): 40–26
- Umpire: Mark Blandford-Baker

The 66th Women's Boat Race took place on 27 March 2011. The race was conducted as part of the Henley Boat Races and took place at Henley-on-Thames. Oxford won by one length in a time of 6 minutes 24 seconds, their fourth consecutive win. The victory took the overall record in the event to 40–26 in Cambridge's favour.

== Background ==
The Women's Boat Race is a side-by-side rowing competition between Oxford University Women's Boat Club (OUWBC) and the Cambridge University Women's Boat Club (CUWBC) that has taken place since 1927. It was conducted as part of the Henley Boat Races, on the traditional straight course at Henley-on-Thames. Oxford went into the race as champions, having won the 2010 race by four lengths, with Cambridge leading 40–25 overall. The race was sponsored by Newton Investment Management, a subsidiary of The Bank of New York Mellon, for the first time.

The umpire for the race was Mark Blandford-Baker, bursar of Magdalen College, Oxford.

== Crews ==
Trials for the crews were held in December 2010. Oxford's trial boats raced along the Adelaide Straight in Ely and were named Keep Calm and Carry On.

Oxford's crew included Natalie Redgrave, the daughter of five-time Olympic gold medallist Steve Redgrave.

Seat	Cambridge		Oxford	
Seat	Name	College	Name	College
Bow	Elizabeth Polgreen (P)	Girton	Nicole Scheumann	Lincoln
2	Izzi Boanas-Evans	Murray Edwards	Connie Spoor (P)	Magdalen
3	Anna Kendrick	Emmanuel	Harriet Keane	St Anne's
4	Ruth Blackshaw	Newnham	Natalie Redgrave	Pembroke
5	Tamara Hornik	Wolfson	Eugenia Gossen	Lincoln
6	Pernille Thuesen	Christ's	Sonia Bracegirdle	Merton
7	Fay Sandford	Gonville and Caius	Eleanor Piggott	Pembroke
Stroke	Cath Wheeler	Queens'	Brianna Stubbs	Pembroke
Cox	Kate Richards	Queens'	Nathaniel Upton	Trinity
Sources: (P) – boat club president

== Race ==
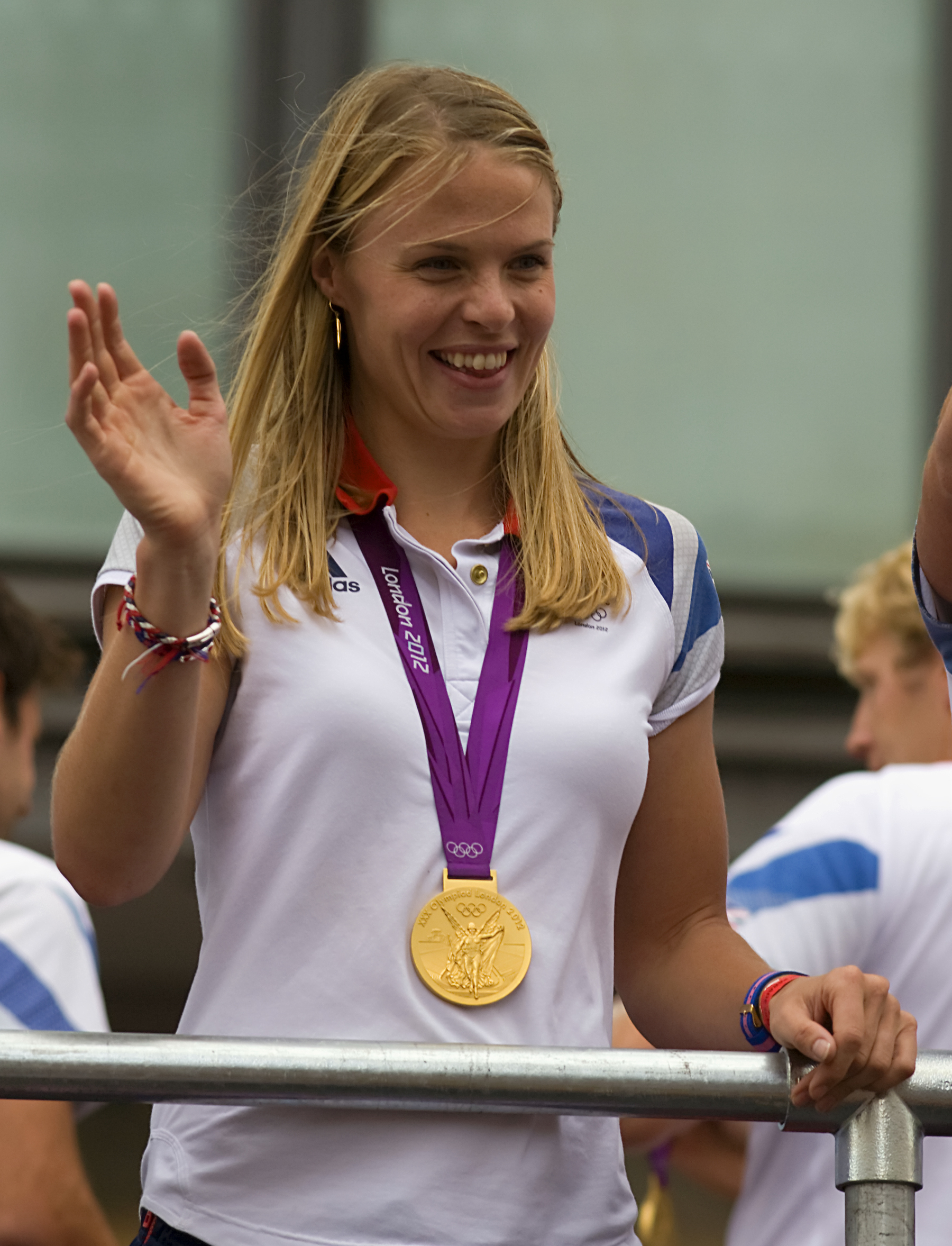
Anna Watkins (pictured in 2012) presented the winners' shield.

The winners' shield was presented by Olympic bronze medallist and former Cambridge college rower Anna Watkins.

== See also ==
- The Boat Race 2011
