= Henley Boat Races =

Annual rowing races in Britain

The Henley Boat Races

Event information
- Race area: Henley Regatta course (downstream); River Thames
- Dates: 1975–2019
- Competitors: CUWBC / CULRC, OUWBC / OULRC / OUWLRC
- Distance: Blue Boats: 2000 m; Collegiate races: 1750 m
- Website: henleyboatraces.com

The Henley Boat Races were a series of annual rowing races between various crews representing the University of Oxford and the University of Cambridge.

The event included the Lightweight Men's Boat Race from 1975 to 2018, the Women's Boat Race from 1977 to 2014, the Lightweight Women's Boat Race from 1984 to 2019, and the Collegiate Boat Races from 2010 to 2019. Between 2015 and 2020, the openweight and lightweight Varsity races previously held at Henley were relocated to the Championship Course to match the openweight men's Boat Race, at which point the Collegiate Boat Races were scrapped.

== History ==
Henley Boat Races took place annually in late March or early April the week before the University Boat Races, which are held on the Championship Course on the Thames in London.

The Henley Boat Races began as men's lightweight races in 1975 and enlarged to incorporate the Women's Boat Race and their reserve crew race from 1977 and the women's lightweight race from 1984. In 2000, the lightweight men added a race for their reserve crews, Nephthys (Oxford) and Granta (Cambridge). The races took place in 2001, at the Holme Pierrepont National Watersports Centre in Nottingham. The lightweight men's race fell into abeyance after 2009 as a result of Cambridge not fielding a Granta crew from 2007, giving Oxford a row over for three years. From 2016, Nephthys and Granta raced again, sometimes on a different date or location to the main Henley Boat Races. A women's lightweight reserve race was held in 2012 prior to race day and took place from 2016 on race day. The 2013 event was moved to Dorney Lake as a result of flooding on the Thames.

In 2015, the Women's Boat Race moved further down the River Thames to the Tideway to take place as a combined men's and women's Boat Race. The event was moved to Dorney Lake again in 2018 due to "adverse river conditions on the Thames at Henley" and the collegiate races were cancelled. The Lightweight Men's Boat Race made the same move to the Tideway in 2019, followed by the Lightweight Women's Boat Race in 2020, although the Lightweight Boat Races continue to operate separately to their openweight counterparts.

The races received local and national press coverage in many years, and competitors from both Universities have gone on to compete at international and Olympic levels.

== Events ==
Crews from the University of Oxford and the University of Cambridge raced side by side over a 2000-meter course on the River Thames at Henley-on-Thames, racing downstream—the opposite direction to the Henley Royal Regatta course—and finishing halfway down Temple Island. The collegiate races took place over a shorter 1750 m course. The races typically included:

- Women's Boat Race (OUWBC vs CUWBC)
- Lightweight Men's Boat Race (OULRC vs CULRC)
- Lightweight Women's Boat Race (OUWLRC vs CUWBC Lightweights)
- Women's Reserves (Osiris vs Blondie)
- Lightweight Men's Reserves (Nephthys vs Granta) [held separately on an earlier date]
- Lightweight Women's Reserves (Tethys vs CUWBC Lightweight Reserves)
- Men's Intercollegiate Boat Race (between one college representing Oxford and one representing Cambridge)
- Women's Intercollegiate Boat Race (between one college representing Oxford and one representing Cambridge)

An Alumnae race was typically held in later years. The lightweight races constituted the varsity race. The first crew received university half-blues, and was therefore more commonly known as the Lightweight Blue Boat. The reserve crew received university colours. The intercollegiate races were between the fastest crews from the Oxford Torpids and the Cambridge Lent Bumps; Oxford selection was done by time trial and Cambridge gave the right of first refusal to headship crews.

== Results ==
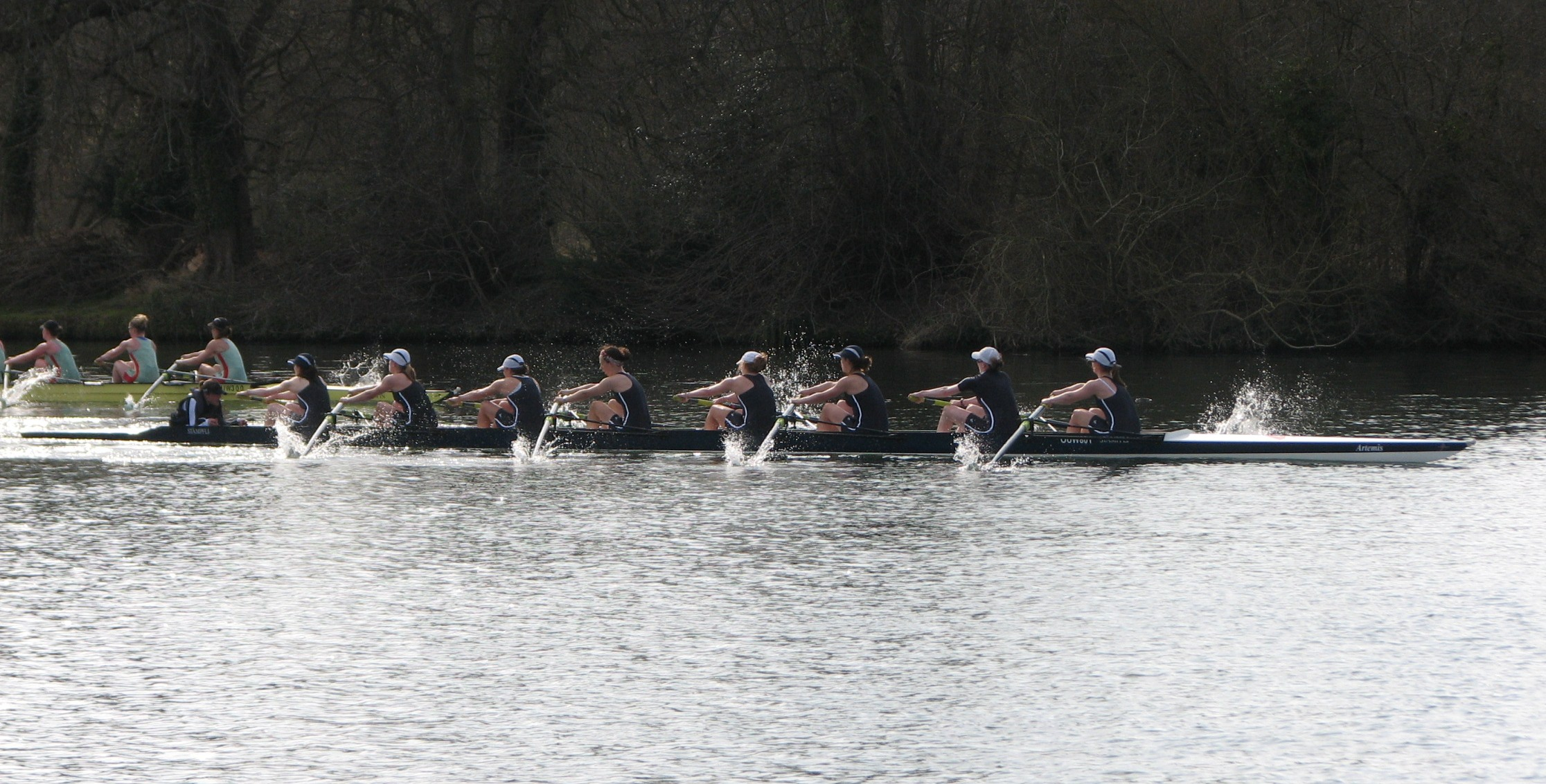
Henley Boat Races 2009: Oxford Women (dark blue) lead Cambridge Women.

The history of the results of the races are as follows.

=== Women's Boat Race ===
The Women's Boat Race and its Reserve race became part of the Henley Boat Races in 1977. With the Women's Boat Race moving to the Tideway Championship Course and forming part of The Boat Races 2015, the race as well as the race of the reserve boats Osiris and Blondie ceased to be part of the Henley Boat Races. For the full results tables, see the main article on the Women's Boat Race.

- Cambridge: 21 wins at Henley
- Oxford: 17 wins at Henley

No.	Date	Winner	Time	Winning Margin (Lengths)	Oxford Wins	Cambridge Wins
32	1977	Cambridge			11	21
33	1978	Cambridge			11	22
34	1979	Cambridge			11	23
35	1980	Oxford			12	23
36	1981	Oxford			13	23
37	1982	Cambridge			13	24
38	1983	Cambridge			13	25
39	1984	Cambridge			13	26
40	1985	Oxford			14	26
41	1986	Oxford			15	26
42	1987	Cambridge			15	27
43	1988	Oxford			16	27
44	1989	Cambridge	6:20	1	16	28
45	1990	Cambridge	7:17	3 1/4	16	29
46	1991	Oxford	7:29	3	17	29
47	1992	Cambridge	6:20	1/3	17	30
48	1993	Cambridge	6:10	4 1/2	17	31
49	1994	Cambridge	6:11	1	17	32
50	1995	Cambridge	6:02	1 1/3	17	33
51	1996	Cambridge	6:12	4	17	34
52	1997	Cambridge	6:26	1 1/4	17	35
53	1998	Cambridge	6:25	1 1/4	17	36
54	1999	Cambridge	6:01	1	17	37
55	2000	Oxford	6:18	2 1/4	18	37
56	2001	Cambridge	7:27	3 ft.	18	38
57	2002	Oxford	6:02	2 1/2	19	38
58	2003	Oxford	6:35	3 1/2	20	38
59	2004	Oxford	6:06	4	21	38
60	2005	Cambridge	6:27	2 1/3	21	39
61	1 April 2006	Oxford	5:44	1/2	22	39
62	1 April 2007‡	Cambridge	4:03	1/2	22	40
63	23 March 2008	Oxford	6:39	1/2	23	40
64	22 March 2009	Oxford	6:24	1 1/4	24	40
65	28 March 2010	Oxford	5:56	4	25	40
66	27 March 2011	Oxford	6:24	1	26	40
67	25 March 2012	Cambridge	6:38	1/4	26	41
68	24 March 2013	Oxford	7:21	1 3/4	27	41
69	29 March 2014	Oxford	5:50	4	28	41

Notes

‡ – The course was shortened in 2007 due to rough water during the Henley Boat Races. It was reduced from 2000 m to less than 1500 m with the start between the Upper Thames Rowing Club and Old Blades.

=== Lightweight Men's Boat Race ===
- Cambridge: 28 wins
- Oxford: 16 wins

Date	Winner	Time	Winning Margin (Lengths)	Oxford Wins	Cambridge Wins
1975	Cambridge			-	1
1976	Oxford			1	1
1977	Oxford			2	1
1978	Cambridge			2	2
1979	Cambridge			2	3
1980	Cambridge			2	4
1981	Cambridge			2	5
1982	Cambridge			2	6
1983	Cambridge			2	7
1984	Cambridge		1 1/3	2	8
1985	Cambridge		6 ft	2	9
1986	Cambridge		2	2	10
1987	Cambridge	6:09	1/2	2	11
1988	Cambridge			2	12
1989	Cambridge	5:51	4 1/2	2	13
1990	Cambridge	6:40	4 3/4	2	14
1991	Cambridge	6:39	1/3	2	15
1992	Oxford	5:40	2 1/2	3	15
1993	Cambridge	5:39	1/2	3	16
1994	Oxford	5:35	3/4	4	16
1995	Cambridge	5:29	1/3	4	17
1996	Oxford	NRO disq		5	17
1997	Oxford	5:49	1	6	17
1998	Cambridge	5:45	1/2	6	18
1999	Oxford	5:31	1 1/2	7	18
2000	Cambridge	5:40	2	7	19
2001	Cambridge	6:33	4	7	20
2002	Oxford	5:21	2	8	20
2003	Oxford	5:55	1 1/4	9	20
2004	Oxford	5:36	1/2	10	20
2005	Oxford	5:51	3	11	20
1 April 2006	Oxford	5:18	2 1/4	12	20
1 April 2007	Oxford	3:44	1	13	20
23 March 2008	Oxford	6:15	2 1/2	14	20
22 March 2009	Cambridge	5:49	3	14	21
28 March 2010	Cambridge	5:28	2 ft	14	22
27 March 2011	Oxford	5:54	Canvas	15	22
25 March 2012	Cambridge	6:00	3/4	15	23
24 March 2013	Oxford	6:49	1 2/3	16	23
30 March 2014	Cambridge	5:30	3 1/2	16	24
5 April 2015	Cambridge	5:55	4 ft	16	25
19 March 2016	Cambridge	6:19	Easily	16	26
26 March 2017	Cambridge	6:07	1 3/4	16	27
18 March 2018	Cambridge	6:26	1/3 (Raced at Dorney)	16	28

=== Lightweight Women's Boat Race ===
- Cambridge: 19 wins
- Oxford: 17 wins

Date	Winner	Time	Winning Margin (Lengths)	Oxford Wins	Cambridge Wins
1984	Cambridge			-	1
1985	Cambridge			-	2
1986	Oxford			1	2
1987	Cambridge			1	3
1988	Cambridge			1	4
1989	Cambridge	6:37	1	1	5
1990	Cambridge	7:35	2 1/3	1	6
1991	Cambridge	7:48	2 1/4	1	7
1992	Cambridge	6:35	3	1	8
1993	Cambridge	6:18	Easily	1	9
1994	Cambridge	6:23	1 ft.	1	10
1995	Oxford	6:19	2	2	10
1996	Cambridge	6:36	Canvas	2	11
1997	Cambridge	6:37	Canvas	2	12
1998	Oxford	6:36	Canvas	3	12
1999	Oxford	6:01 1/2	2 3/4	4	12
2000	Oxford	6:22	2 1/2	5	12
2001	Cambridge	7:37	3	5	13
2002	Oxford	6:06	4	6	13
2003	Oxford	6:51	2	7	13
2004	Oxford	6:08	3/4	8	13
2005	Oxford	6:55	1/2	9	13
1 April 2006	Cambridge	6:00	Canvas	9	14
1 April 2007	Oxford	4:11	1	10	14
23 March 2008	Cambridge	7:01	1/3	10	15
22 March 2009	Oxford	6:30	2 1/2	11	15
28 March 2010	Oxford	6:01	2 3/4	12	15
27 March 2011	Cambridge	6:43	1 1/2	12	16
25 March 2012	Oxford	6:48	1 1/3	13	16
24 March 2013	Oxford	7:33	4 3/4	14	16
29 March 2014	Oxford	6:08	3 1/2	15	16
5 April 2015	Cambridge	6:26	3 ft.	15	17
19 March 2016	Oxford	6:54	Canvas	16	17
26 March 2017	Cambridge	6:45	3	16	18
18 March 2018	Cambridge	7:24	1/2 (Raced at Dorney)	16	19
30 March 2019	Oxford	6:28	2 1/2	17	19

=== Women's Reserves (Osiris vs Blondie) ===
- Cambridge: 19 wins at Henley
- Oxford: 19 wins at Henley

Date	Winner	Time	Winning Margin (Lengths)	Oxford Wins	Cambridge Wins
1977	Cambridge			-	5
1978	Cambridge			-	6
1979	Cambridge			-	7
1980	Cambridge			-	8
1981	Oxford			1	8
1982	Cambridge			1	9
1983	Oxford			2	9
1984	Oxford			3	9
1985	Oxford			4	9
1986	Cambridge			4	10
1987	Cambridge			4	11
1988	Oxford			5	11
1989	Oxford	6:33	1	6	11
1990	Cambridge	7:34	1 1/4	6	12
1991	Cambridge	7:36	2 3/4	6	13
1992	Cambridge	6:32	3 1/2	6	14
1993	Cambridge	6:22	1 1/2	6	15
1994	Cambridge	6:22	Canvas	6	16
1995	Cambridge	6:08	1	6	17
1996	Cambridge	6:33	5	6	18
1997	Cambridge	6:36	1/4	6	19
1998	Cambridge	6:32	4	6	20
1999	Oxford	6:09	1 3/4	7	20
2000	Cambridge	6:27	1 3/4	7	21
2001	Oxford	7:32	Easily	8	21
2002	Oxford	6:09	1 3/4	9	21
2003	Oxford	6:43	2	10	21
2004	Oxford	6:16	1/2	11	21
2005	Oxford	6:41	1 3/4	12	21
1 April 2006	Oxford	5:54	2 1/2	13	21
1 April 2007‡	Oxford	NTT	1	14	21
23 March 2008	Oxford	7:09	Easily	15	21
22 March 2009	Cambridge	6:50	1 1/2	15	22
28 March 2010	Oxford	6:10	3 1/2	16	22
27 March 2011	Cambridge	-	Disq	16	23
25 March 2012	Oxford	6:57	3 1/2	17	23
24 March 2013	Oxford	7:41	6	18	23
29 March 2014	Oxford	6:01.5	1/2	19	23

=== Lightweight Men's Reserves (Nephthys vs Granta) ===
- Oxford: 9 wins
- Cambridge: 4 wins

Date	Winner	Time	Winning Margin (Lengths)	Oxford Wins	Cambridge Wins
2000	Cambridge	5:50	2 3/4	-	1
2001	Oxford	7	1/2	1	1
2002	Oxford	5:33	2	2	1
2003	Cambridge	6:19	2 1/2	2	2
2004	Oxford	5:45	Canvas	3	2
2005	Oxford	6:07	4 1/2	4	2
1 April 2006	Oxford	5:26	5	5	2
1 April 2007	Oxford	4:08	R/O due to no Cambridge crew. Lost to Old Boys.	6	2
23 March 2008	Oxford	6:29	R/O due to no Cambridge crew. Lost to Old Boys.	7	2
22 March 2009	Oxford	6:15	R/O due to no Cambridge crew. Beat Durham.	8	2
			Race in abeyance 2010 - 2015		
13 March 2016	Cambridge	-	1 1/4 (Raced in 4x)	8	3
26 March 2017	Oxford	6:19	1/2 (Raced in 4+)	9	3
18 March 2018	Cambridge	7:24	3/4 (Raced in 4+ at Dorney)	9	4

=== Lightweight Women's Reserves (Tethys vs CUWBC Lightweight Reserves) ===
- Cambridge: 4
- Oxford: 1

Raced on the Friday before the main event in a 4+ in 2012, and incorporated into main race day in 2016.

Date	Winner	Time	Winning Margin (Lengths)	Oxford Wins	Cambridge Wins
2012	Cambridge		(Raced in 4+)	-	1
19 March 2016	Cambridge	8:55	3/4 (Raced in 2-)	-	2
26 March 2017	Cambridge		easily (Raced in 2-)	-	3
18 March 2018	Oxford	8:15	easily (Raced in 4+ at Dorney)	1	3
30 March 2019	Cambridge		1 1/2 (Raced in 2-)	1	4

=== Men's Collegiate Boat Race ===
- Cambridge: 7
- Oxford: 2

Year	Oxford	Cambridge	Time	Verdict (lengths)	Oxford Wins	Cambridge Wins
2010	Balliol	First & Third		easily	-	1
2011	Christ Church	Caius	4:06	3	-	2
2012	Pembroke	Caius			-	3
2013	Balliol	Caius			-	4
2014	Oriel	Downing		1/2	-	5
2015	Oriel	Jesus		3	1	5
2016	Pembroke	Caius		1	2	5
2017	Oriel	Lady Margaret		4	2	6
2018^{a}	Wolfson	Lady Margaret		-	2	6
2019	Wadham	Caius			2	7

^{a} Collegiate races cancelled due to adverse weather conditions

=== Women's Collegiate Boat Race ===
- Cambridge: 5
- Oxford: 4

Year	Oxford	Cambridge	Time	Verdict (lengths)	Oxford Wins	Cambridge Wins
2010	Worcester	Queens'		narrowly	-	1
2011	Magdalen	Pembroke	4:47.5	1/3	-	2
2012	Pembroke				1	2
2013	St John's	Downing			1	3
2014	Wadham	First & Third		2 1/2	2	3
2015	Green Templeton	Christ's		3/4	2	4
2016	Christ Church	Jesus		4	3	4
2017	Keble	Jesus		2	4	4
2018^{a}	Keble	Jesus		-	4	4
2019	Wadham	Newnham			4	5

^{a} Collegiate races cancelled due to adverse weather conditions
