= Oxford University Women's Boat Club =

British rowing club

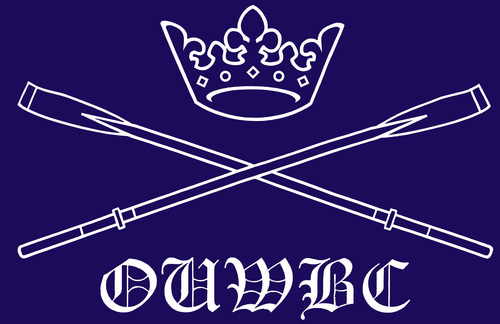
- Location: Wallingford, Oxford, UK
- Home water: River Thames
- Founded: 1927
- Key people: Andy Nelder (Chief Coach)
- University: University of Oxford
- Website: www.ouwbc.org

Oxford University Women's Boat Club (OUWBC) was the rowing club for female rowers (and coxes of either sex) who were students at the University of Oxford. The club was founded in 1926 and was based in Wallingford at the Fleming Boat House, along with OUBC, OUWLRC and OULRC.

The training season ran from September through to July, with the major event, the Women's Boat Race against Cambridge University Women's Boat Club (CUWBC), happening in March or April. Up until 2015 the Women's Boat Race had taken place over 2000m as part of the Henley Boat Races on the Henley Reach.

In 2015, for the first time, the Women's Boat Race took place on the 6.8 km Championship Course on the Tideway, and was televised on the BBC alongside the Men's Boat Race.

In 2023, OUWBC merged with OUBC, OUWLRC and OULRC to form one Oxford University Boat Club.

== History ==
The original challenge between the Oxford and Cambridge University boat clubs was issued in 1829. As a result, two men's eights raced on the river at Henley-on-Thames. In 1836 the race was moved to the Tideway in London, and it has remained there ever since. At this time rowing was not seen as an appropriate sport for a lady. However, towards the end of the century attitudes began to change.

The two universities caught onto the trend a few decades later and OUWBC was formed in May 1926. Following on from this the 'Ladies' Boat Race' was founded in 1927. The first races took place on The Isis in Oxford and took the form of a time and style contest, since the Principals of the women's colleges disapproved of racing. The OUWBC was disbanded for financial reasons in 1953 but re-formed in 1964. The races were held alternately on The Isis and The Cam and in 1975 a 2nd VIII race was added. In 1977 the 'Women's Boat Race' was invited to join the men's lightweights at Henley and so the 'Henley Boat Races' were established. At this time, the women's reserve race crews were named 'Osiris' (Oxford) and 'Blondie' (Cambridge) to parallel the men's reserves 'Isis' and 'Goldie'. From 1977 to 2014 the Women's Boat Race continued to be held at Henley over 2000m (excluding 2013 where the race was moved to Dorney Lake due to flooding).

=== Sponsorship and the move to the Tideway ===
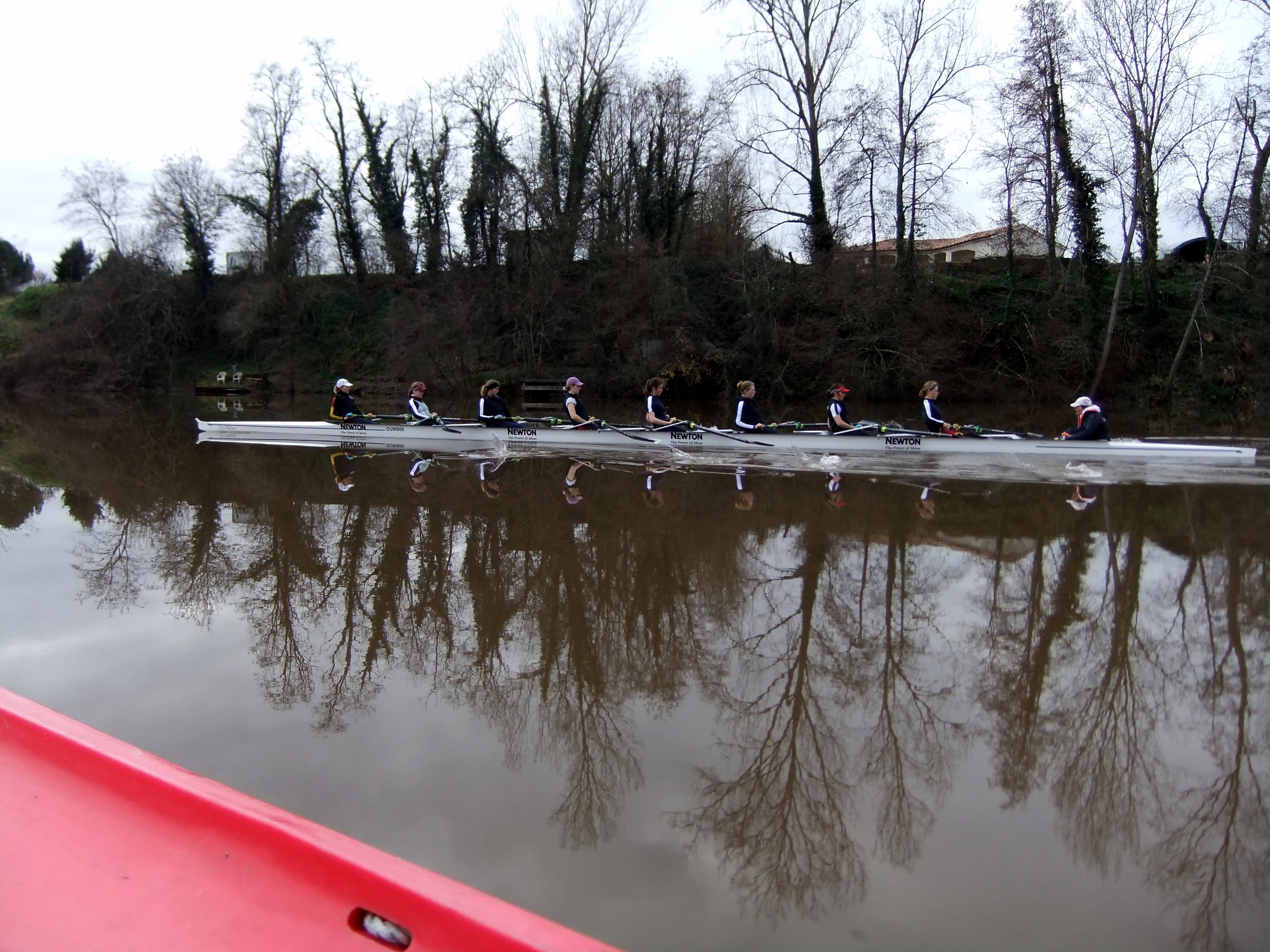
OUWBC in training at training camp, January 2012

Following a sponsorship deal with Newton Investment Management, established shortly before the Women's Boat Race 2011, parent company BNY Mellon announced in February that they would be sponsoring both the men's and women's boat races from the 2013 race. This sponsorship was key in enabling the Women's Boat Race to move to the Tideway in 2015.

Since the 2012 race, Newton Investment Management has provided equal funding to OUWBC and CUWBC to enable the clubs to employ full time professional coaches and a support team to transition ‘from a student-run club to a pre-elite team’ on their road to the Tideway.

=== 2015 Newton Women's Boat Race ===
In 2015, the Women's Boat Race took place on the Championship Course between the University stones at Putney and Mortlake on 11 April. The Reserve boat, Osiris, raced the Cambridge reserve boat, Blondie, on 10 April over the same course.

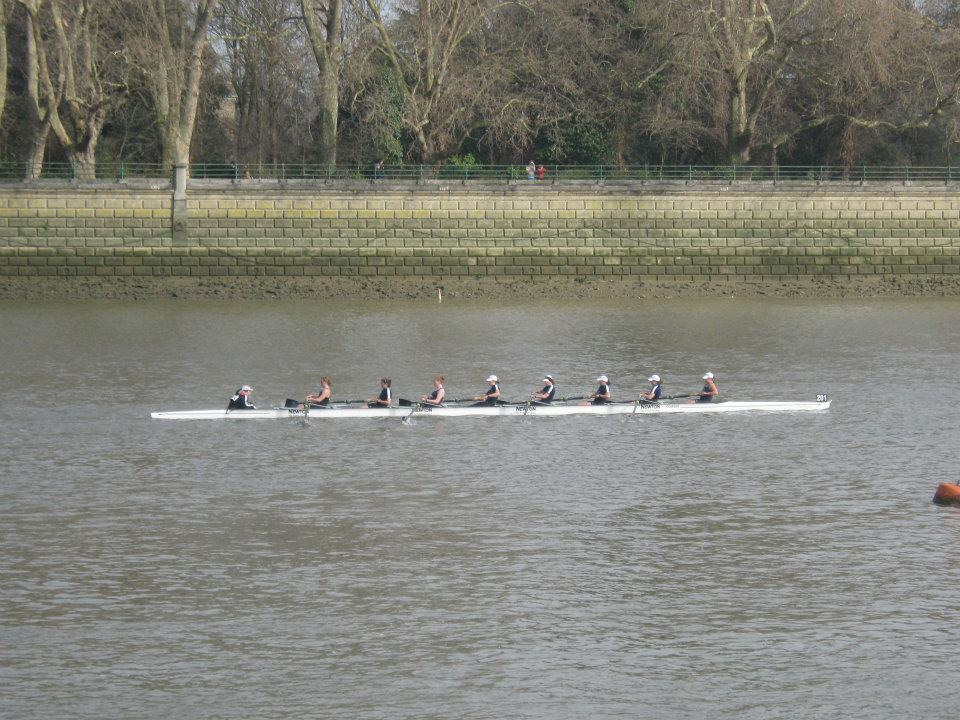
OUWBC competing at Women's Eights Head of the River on the Tideway, March 2012

== Osiris Honours ==
=== British champions ===
Year	Winning crew/s
1986	Women 4x
2007	Women 8+

== See also ==
- British Rowing
- University rowing (UK)
- Women's rowing
