= Women's Boat Race =

Boat race on the River Thames

Coordinates: 51.4675°N 0.2150°W

The Women's Boat Race

Event information
- Race area: The Championship Course; River Thames, London (2015 onwards, except 2021 on the River Great Ouse); Henley (1977 to 2014 except 2001 at NWSC and 2013 on Dorney Lake); The Isis, Oxford and River Cam, Cambridge (1927 to 1976 with several gaps); River Thames, London (1929, 1935)
- Dates: 1927, annual since 1964
- Sponsor: Chanel (since 2025)
- Competitors: CUBC, OUWBC
- Distance: 4.2 miles (6.8 km)
- First race: 15 March 1927
- Website: theboatrace.org

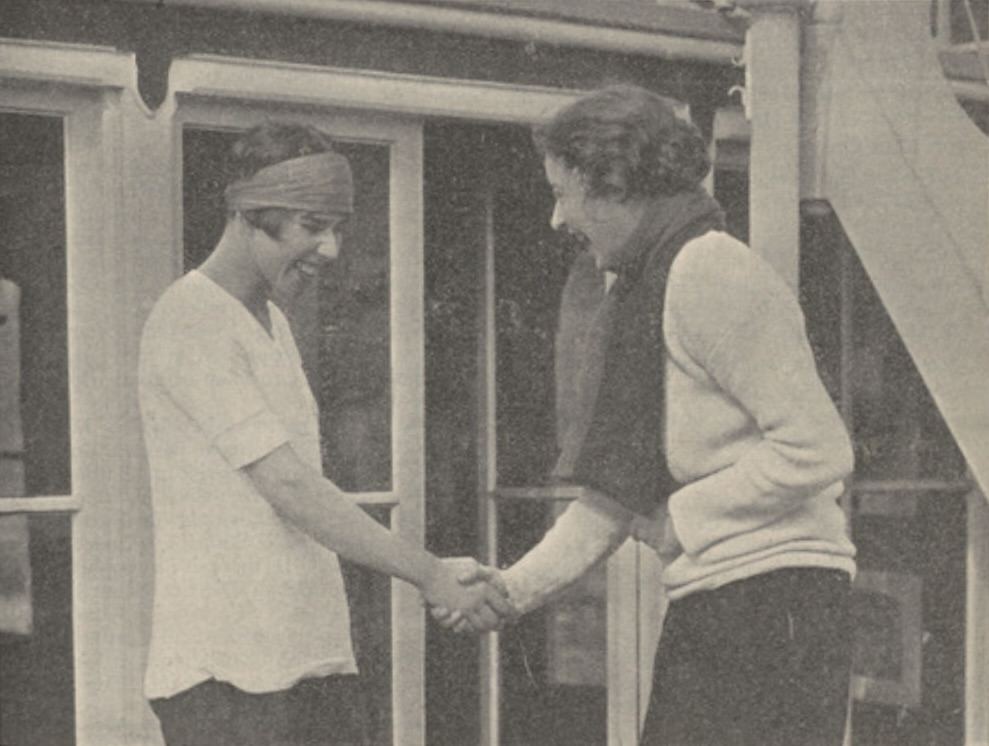
Team captains C.S. Joris and C.D. England shake hands at the inaugural Oxford v. Cambridge Women's Boat Race in 1927

The Women's Boat Race is an annual rowing race between Cambridge University Boat Club and Oxford University Women's Boat Club. First rowed in 1927, the race has taken place annually since 1964. Since the 2015 race it has been rowed on the same day and course as the men's Boat Race on the River Thames in London, taking place around Easter, and since 2018 the name "The Boat Race" has been applied to the combined event. The race is rowed in eights and the cox can be of either gender.

The course covers a 4.2 miles (6.8 km) stretch of the Thames in West London, from Putney to Mortlake. Members of both crews are traditionally known as blues and each boat as a "Blue Boat", with Cambridge in light blue and Oxford dark blue. The women's race has received television coverage and grown in popularity since 2015, attracting a television audience of 4.8 million viewers that year. As of the 2026 race Cambridge have won the race 49 times and Oxford 31 times. Cambridge has led Oxford in cumulative wins since 1966.

== History ==
=== Early years ===
The first women's rowing event between Oxford and Cambridge was held on 15 March 1927 on The Isis in Oxford. This was not solely a race in the years up to 1935, the two boats were not on the river together and were judged on both their speed and their "steadiness, finish, rhythm and other matters of style". The Times reported that "large and hostile crowds gathered on the towpath" and The New York Times stated "a crowd of fully five thousand persons was on hand as a willing cheering section". The race covered a distance of approximately 1/2 mile (0.80 km) over which the crews were judged on their style while rowing downstream and their speed while rowing back upstream. Reports differ as to the judges' opinions on style: one suggests they failed to agree on a winner, another indicates that they deemed the style of each crew to be equal. As a result, the judges based their decision on speed: the race was won by Oxford in a time of 3 minutes 36 seconds, beating Cambridge by 15 seconds.

The next occurrence was the 1929 event, which took place on the Tideway in London. After the 1930 event and 1934 event, the crews took to the river together for the first time at the 1935 race. Rowing on the Thames in London, Oxford's boat was sent off first with the Cambridge boat following thirty seconds later. The 1936 race, held on The Isis, was the first to take place side by side. Later, the location alternated between the River Cam in Cambridge and The Isis, over a distance of about 1,000 yards. Unlike the men's race, the women's continued in most years through the Second World War.

The Cambridge University Women's Boat Club was founded in 1941 when Girton College became the second women's college to cater for rowing. Until that year Cambridge was represented by Newnham College Boat Club. The first blues were awarded in 1941 when CUWBC raced against the Oxford University Women's Boat Club, which had been founded in 1926. All of the Cambridge rowers in 1941 were members of Newnham College. The following year the first non-Newnham rower competed.

In training after the 1952 race, Oxford rowed over a weir and was banned from the river. Both OUWBC and later CUWBC suffered from lack of funds and the race fell into abeyance. After a 12-year gap, the race restarted in 1964 and has been held annually since. The number of women rowers increased as more colleges started to admit women. A women's reserve race in IVs took place in 1965, the same year the men's reserve boats began racing, and women's reserve eights from each university began racing in 1966. A second reserve race was run in 1968, and the reserves have raced annually since 1975. The women's reserve boats were later named Osiris (Oxford) and Blondie (Cambridge).

=== Henley Boat Races ===
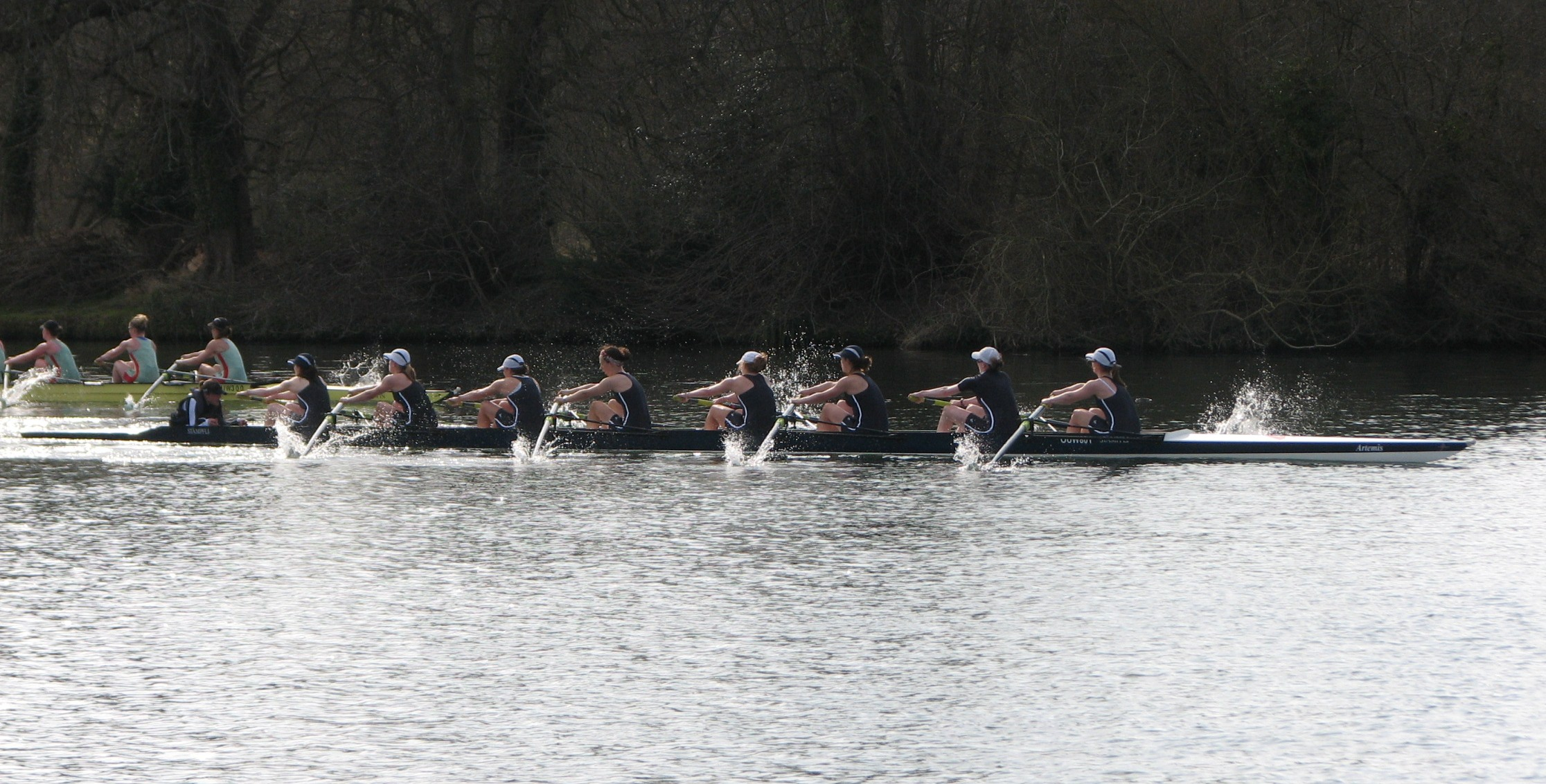
Henley Boat Races 2009: Oxford Women (dark blue) lead Cambridge Women

In 1975 the men's lightweight race started at Henley-on-Thames and the women's Boat race was relocated there in 1977 creating the Henley Boat Races. At Henley the race took place over a distance of 2,000 metres. BBC One broadcast a feature on Oxford's training for the 1982 race.

The First VIII receive university blues, and is therefore more commonly known as the Blue Boat, with Cambridge in light blue and Oxford dark blue. While the crew is all female, the cox can be male or female. The Second VIII receives university colours. The 2011 race was the first to be sponsored by Newton Investment Management, a subsidiary of BNY Mellon. Previously the crews had no sponsorship and were self funded. Newton increased the amount of funding significantly.

For the 2013 race the entire Henley Boat Races was moved to Dorney Lake because of flooding on the river, and they had also been moved in 2001, to the Holme Pierrepont National Watersports Centre in Nottingham. Oxford won the 2014 race on the Henley course having beaten Cambridge by a distance of four boat lengths over two kilometres. A newly designed trophy, to replace the existing wooden shield, was awarded to the Oxford president by Olympic gold medallist Sophie Hosking who had won the Women's lightweight double sculls at the 2012 Summer Olympics.

=== The Boat Race ===
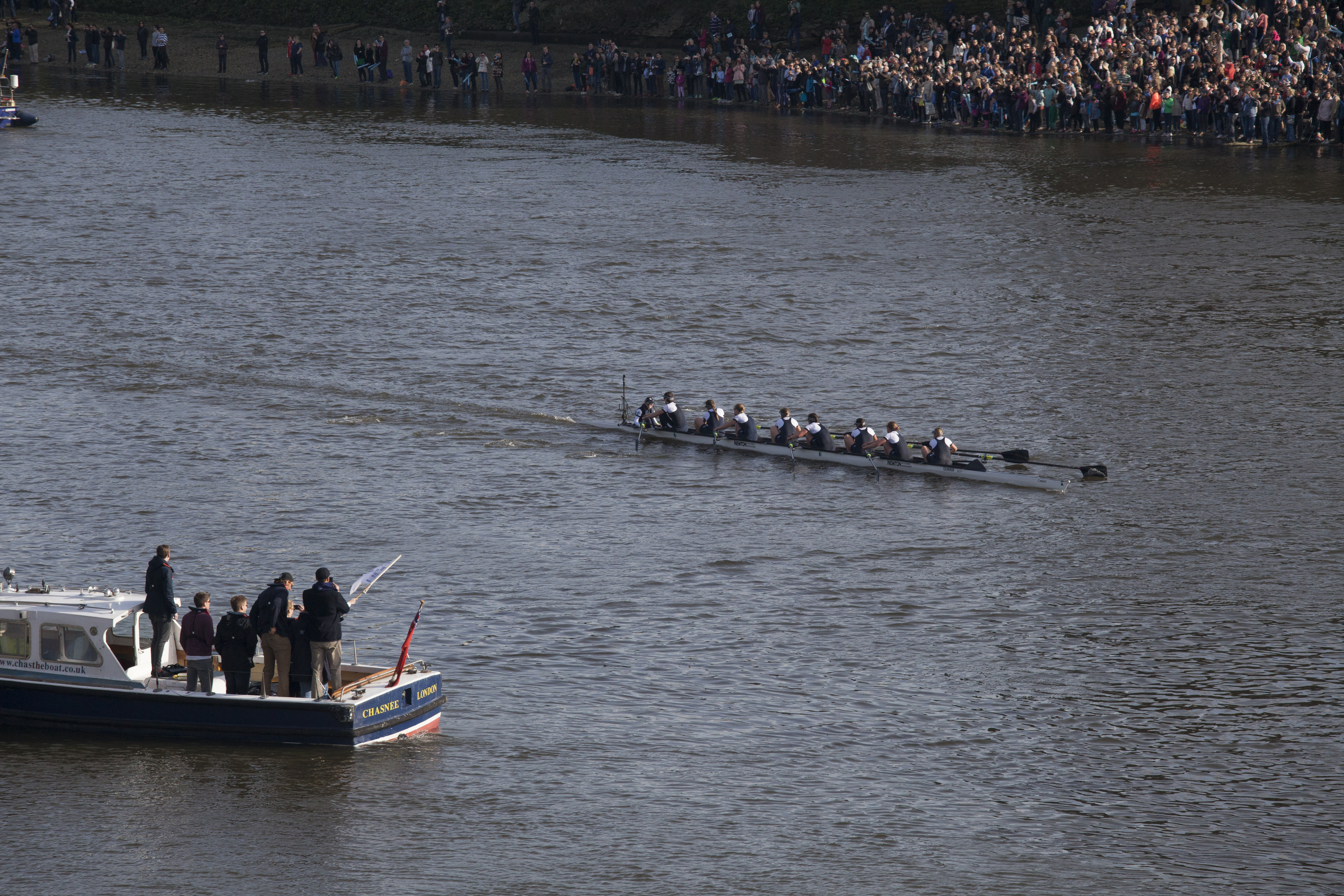
Oxford Women's Blue Boat at The Championship Course finish in 2015

On 11 April 2015 the 70th women's race was held on The Championship Course on the same day as the traditional male event for the first time. The course covers a 4.2 miles (6.8 km) stretch of the Thames in West London, from Putney to Mortlake. Rebranded as "The Boat Races", the combined event was broadcast on national television in UK, during which the audience for the women's race reached 4.8 million viewers. OUWBC won by six and half lengths that year. The Reserves race also moved to the Championship Course in 2015, running on the day prior to the main race. In 2016 all four men's and women's boat races took place on the same day and course for the first time. Cancer Research UK were gifted the title sponsorship rights by BNY Mellon and Newton Investment Management, an arrangement which continued for the following two years. The 2016 race, again receiving national television coverage, was won by Oxford while the Cambridge boat nearly sank in the rough conditions.

The 2017 race took place on Sunday 2 April at 16:35 British Summer Time, an hour before the men's race. Cambridge won for the first time in five years after Oxford caught a crab at the start. They set a record on the new course, beating the time first set on this course in 2015 by over a minute. The time was faster, in different conditions, than the Cambridge men's Blue Boat in 2016 and the Oxford men's in 2014. Beginning with the 2018 race, the combined event was branded simply as "The Boat Race", consisting of "The Women's Boat Race" and "The Men's Boat Race". The 2019 race was Cambridge's third consecutive victory and the fourth consecutive victory for their reserve boat, Blondie. The Royal National Lifeboat Institution (RNLI) were the official charity from 2019 until 2021. The 2020 race did not take place due to the COVID-19 pandemic. A stretch of the River Great Ouse was the venue for the 2021 race. Gemini became the sponsor that year. The 2022 race was won by Cambridge in a record time on the Tideway. The 2023 race was won by Cambridge by four and a half lengths. Cambridge retained their title as winners of the 2024 race, 7 lengths ahead of rivals Oxford. The French luxury brand Chanel took over the title sponsor for the 2025 race, which provided the eighth consecutive victory for Cambridge. The 2026 race saw Oxford win for the first time in nearly a decade.

The race has been won 49 times by Cambridge and 31 times by Oxford, with Cambridge leading Oxford in cumulative wins since 1966. The reserves race has been won 32 times by Cambridge and 21 times by Oxford, with Cambridge leading in cumulative wins since the inception of the race.

=== 2027 centenary ===
The 2027 race will mark the centenary of the inaugural Women's Boat Race.

== Results ==
Cumulative wins by Oxford and Cambridge men's and women's blue and reserve boats (In the SVG file, hover over a graph to highlight it.)

=== Women's Boat Race ===
- Cambridge: 49 wins
- Oxford: 31 wins

No.	Date	Winner	Winning time	Margin of victory	Oxford total	Cambridge total
1	1927†	Oxford	3:36	15 seconds	1	0
2	1929†^	Newnham	3:32	0.4 seconds	1	1
3	1930†^	Newnham			1	2
4	1934†	Oxford		3 seconds	2	2
5	1935	Oxford	4:09	6 seconds	3	2
6	1936	Oxford	2:15	1/2 length	4	2
7	1937	Oxford			5	2
8	1939	Oxford	4:59	5 lengths	6	2
9	1941	Oxford		6 seconds	7	2
10	1942	Cambridge			7	3
11	1944	Cambridge			7	4
12	1945	Cambridge			7	5
13	1946	Cambridge			7	6
14	1948	Cambridge			7	7
15	1949	Oxford			8	7
16	1950	Oxford			9	7
17	1951	Oxford			10	7
18	1952	Cambridge	4:04	2 1/2 lengths	10	8
19	1964	Cambridge			10	9
20	1965	Cambridge			10	10
21	1966	Cambridge			10	11
22	1967	Cambridge			10	12
23	1968	Cambridge			10	13
24	1969	Cambridge			10	14
25	1970	Cambridge			10	15
26	1971	Cambridge			10	16
27	1972	Cambridge			10	17
28	1973	Cambridge	4:07	2 1/2 lengths	10	18
29	1974	Cambridge	4:08	1/2 length	10	19
30	1975	Cambridge	4:07	5 lengths	10	20
31	1976	Oxford			11	20
32	1977	Cambridge			11	21
33	1978	Cambridge			11	22
34	1979	Cambridge	5:52	2 lengths	11	23
35	1980	Oxford		2 1/2 lengths	12	23
36	1981	Oxford	6:12	1 second	13	23
37	1982	Cambridge		4 seconds	13	24
38	1983	Cambridge	6:29	11 seconds	13	25
39	1984	Cambridge		4 1/2 lengths	13	26
40	1985	Oxford			14	26
41	1986	Oxford			15	26
42	1987	Cambridge			15	27
43	1988	Oxford	5:37	1 1/3 lengths	16	27
44	1989	Cambridge	6:20	1 length	16	28
45	1990	Cambridge	7:17	3 1/4 lengths	16	29
46	1991	Oxford	7:29	3 lengths	17	29
47	1992	Cambridge	6:20	1/3 length	17	30
48	1993	Cambridge	6:10	4 1/2 lengths	17	31
49	1994	Cambridge	6:11	1 length	17	32
50	1995	Cambridge	6:02	1 1/3 lengths	17	33
51	1996	Cambridge	6:12	4 lengths	17	34
52	1997	Cambridge	6:26	1 1/4 lengths	17	35
53	1998	Cambridge	6:25	1 1/4 lengths	17	36
54	1999	Cambridge	6:01	1 length	17	37
55	2000	Oxford	6:18	2 1/4 lengths	18	37
56	2001	Cambridge	7:27	3 feet (0.9 m)	18	38
57	2002	Oxford	6:02	2 1/2 lengths	19	38
58	2003	Oxford	6:35	3 1/2 lengths	20	38
59	2004	Oxford	6:06	4 lengths	21	38
60	26 March 2005	Cambridge	6:27	2 1/3 lengths	21	39
61	1 April 2006	Oxford	5:44	1/2 length	22	39
62	1 April 2007‡	Cambridge	4:03	1/2 lengths	22	40
63	23 March 2008	Oxford	6:38	1/2 length	23	40
64	22 March 2009	Oxford	6:24	1 1/4 lengths	24	40
65	28 March 2010	Oxford	5:56	4 lengths	25	40
66	27 March 2011	Oxford	6:38	1 length	26	40
67	25 March 2012	Cambridge	6:38	1/4 length	26	41
68	24 March 2013	Oxford	7:21	1 3/4 lengths	27	41
69	29 March 2014	Oxford	5:50	4 lengths	28	41
70	11 April 2015	Oxford	19:45	6 1/2 lengths	29	41
71	27 March 2016	Oxford	21:49	24 lengths	30	41
72	2 April 2017	Cambridge	18:33	11 lengths	30	42
73	24 March 2018	Cambridge	19:06	7 lengths	30	43
74	7 April 2019	Cambridge	18:47	5 lengths	30	44
n/a	29 March 2020	Race cancelled due to the COVID-19 pandemic			30	44
75	4 April 2021 *	Cambridge	16:27	3/4 length	30	45
76	3 April 2022	Cambridge	18:23	2 1/4 lengths	30	46
77	26 March 2023	Cambridge	20:29	4 1/2 lengths	30	47
78	30 March 2024	Cambridge	21:01	7 lengths	30	48
79	13 April 2025	Cambridge	19:25	2 1/2 lengths	30	49
80	4 April 2026	Oxford	19:15	3 lengths	31	49
81	11 April 2027	TBA	TBA	TBA	TBA	TBA

Notes

† – The events until 1935 were not run solely as races, but were also judged on style merit marks. The crews were not allowed to be on the river at the same time so each eight rowed separately downstream and were judged on style. They then rowed back upstream to record a time.
^ – The Cambridge University Women's Boat Club was founded in 1941 when Girton College became the second women's college to cater for rowing. Until that year Cambridge was represented by Newnham College Boat Club.
‡ – The course was shortened in 2007 due to rough water during the Henley Boat Races. It was reduced from 2,000 m (1.2 mi) to less than 1,500 m (0.9 mi) with the start between the Upper Thames Rowing Club and Old Blades.
* – The race was held on a 3-mile (5 km) stretch of the River Great Ouse.

=== Women's Reserves (Osiris vs Blondie) ===
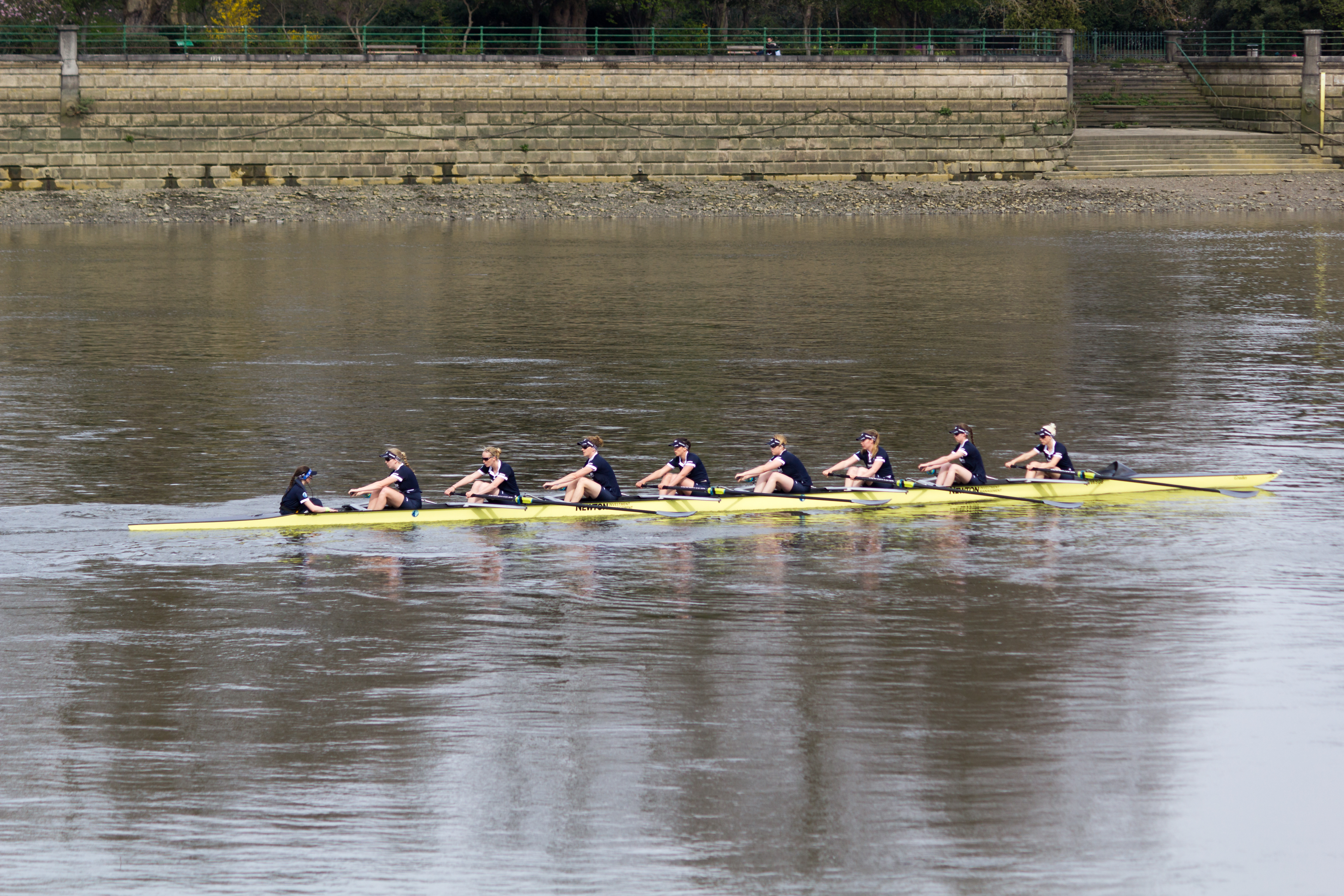
The Newton Women's Boat Race 2015: Reserve Race – Osiris

- Cambridge: 32 wins
- Oxford: 21 wins

No.	Date	Winner	Winning time	Margin of victory	Isis total	Blondie total
1	1966	Blondie			0	1
2	1968	Blondie			0	2
3	1975	Blondie			0	3
4	1976	Blondie			0	4
5	1977	Blondie			0	5
6	1978	Blondie			0	6
7	1979	Blondie			0	7
8	1980	Blondie			0	8
9	1981	Osiris			1	8
10	1982	Blondie			1	9
11	1983	Osiris			2	9
12	1984	Osiris			3	9
13	1985	Osiris			4	9
14	1986	Blondie			4	10
15	1987	Blondie			4	11
16	1988	Osiris			5	11
17	1989	Osiris	6:33	1 length	6	11
18	1990	Blondie	7:34	1 1/4 lengths	6	12
19	1991	Blondie	7:36	2 3/4 lengths	6	13
20	1992	Blondie	6:32	3 1/2 lengths	6	14
21	1993	Blondie	6:22	1 1/2 lengths	6	15
22	1994	Blondie	6:22	canvas	6	16
23	1995	Blondie	6:08	1 length	6	17
24	1996	Blondie	6:33	5 lengths	6	18
25	1997	Blondie	6:36	1/4 length	6	19
26	1998	Blondie	6:32	4 lengths	6	20
27	1999	Osiris	6:09	1 3/4 lengths	7	20
28	2000	Blondie	6:27	1 3/4 lengths	7	21
29	2001	Osiris	7:32	easily	8	21
30	2002	Osiris	6:09	1 3/4 lengths	9	21
31	2003	Osiris	6:43	2 lengths	10	21
32	2004	Osiris	6:16	1/2 lengths	11	21
33	2005	Osiris	6:41	1 3/4 lengths	12	21
34	1 April 2006	Osiris	5:54	2 1/2 lengths	13	21
35	1 April 2007‡	Osiris	no time	1 length	14	21
36	23 March 2008	Osiris	7:09	easily	15	21
37	22 March 2009	Blondie	6:50	1 1/2 lengths	15	22
38	28 March 2010	Osiris	6:10	3 1/2 lengths	16	22
39	27 March 2011	Blondie	—	Osiris disqualified	16	23
40	25 March 2012	Osiris	6:57	3 1/2 lengths	17	23
41	24 March 2013	Osiris	7:41	6 lengths	18	23
42	29 March 2014	Osiris	6:01.5	1/2 length	19	23
43	10 April 2015	Osiris	18:58	15 lengths	20	23
44	27 March 2016	Blondie	21:42	3 lengths	20	24
45	2 April 2017	Blondie	19:06	13 lengths	20	25
46	24 March 2018	Blondie	19:45	9 lengths	20	26
47	7 April 2019	Blondie	19:19	5 lengths	20	27
n/a	29 March 2020	Race cancelled due to the COVID-19 pandemic			20	27
48	25 April 2021	Blondie	(Note: Tideway; race time not recorded.)	7 lengths	20	28
49	3 April 2022	Blondie	19:09	2 3/4 lengths	20	29
50	26 March 2023	Blondie	21:20	3 lengths	20	30
51	30 March 2024	Osiris	TBC	5 lengths	21	30
52	13 April 2025	Blondie	TBC	5 lengths	21	31
53	4 April 2026	Blondie	TBC	9 lengths	21	32

Notes

== See also ==
- List of British and Irish varsity matches
- Oxford–Cambridge rivalry
- Varsity match
