= Women's Boat Race 1927 =

Rowing competition between Oxford University and Cambridge University in 1927

1st Women's Boat Race
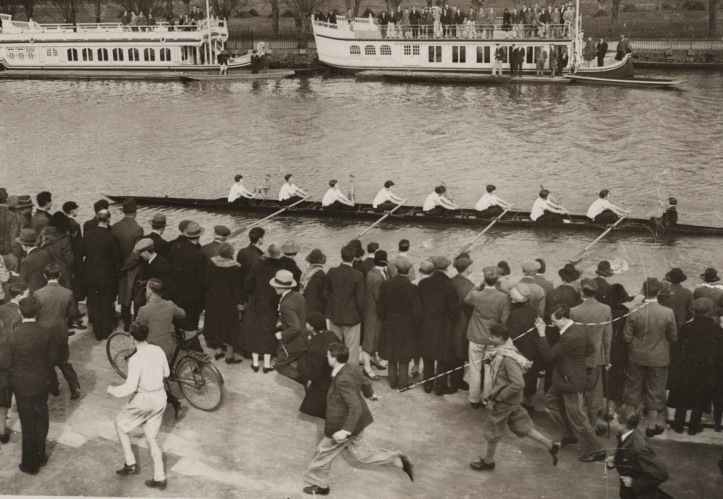
- The Cambridge crew in 1927 on the day of the race
- Date: 15 March 1927
- Winner: Oxford
- Winning time: 3 minutes 36 seconds
- Overall record (Cambridge–Oxford): 0–1
- Umpire: T. H. Henn (Cambridge); J. G. Geoffreys (Oxford)

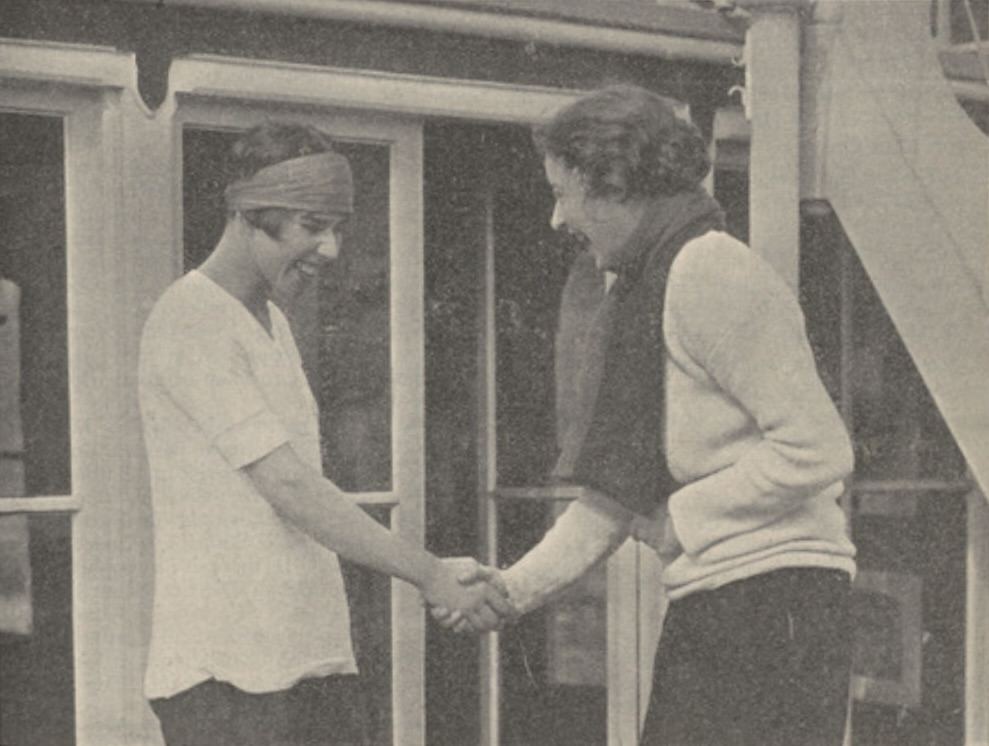
Team captains C.S. Joris and C.D. England shake hands at the inaugural Oxford v. Cambridge Women's Boat Race in 1927

The inaugural Women's Boat Race took place on 15 March 1927. The contest was between crews from the Universities of Oxford and Cambridge and held on The Isis in Oxford.

== Race ==
The Times reported that "large and hostile crowds gathered on the towpath", while The New York Times stated "a crowd of fully five thousand persons was on hand as a willing cheering section". The crews were forbidden from racing side-by-side, and the winners were judged "rowing down stream for style and back again for speed" along the course "from the Free Ferry from the top of Iffley Reach to the Keble barge", a distance of approximately 0.5 miles (0.80 km). The Cambridge crew wore "white jumpers and chocolate shorts and stockings" while Oxford sported "white and dark blue shorts".

The judges for the contest were T. H. Henn (representing Cambridge) and J. G. Geoffreys (representing Oxford). Reports differ as to the judges' opinions on style: one suggests they failed to agree on a winner, another indicates that they deemed the style of each crew to be equal. As a result, the judges based the result on speed: the race was won by Oxford in a time of 3 minutes 36 seconds, beating Cambridge by 15 seconds. The next Women's Boat Race would take place two years later.

== Crews ==
Seat	Oxford		Cambridge	
Seat	Name	College	Name	College
Bow	D. Morely	Oxford Home-Students	A. M. Walmsley	Newnham
2	C. S. Joris	St Hilda's	W. Leverton	Newnham
3	D. E. Gibbs	Somerville	V. Brown	Newnham
4	S. Longmire	St Hilda's	P. M. Havers	Newnham
5	L. Shaw	St Hilda's	B. Hutchinson	Newnham
6	D. G. Cullen	St Hilda's	P. K. Rich	Newnham
7	M. Winder	St Hilda's	E. Rickey	Newnham
Stroke	M. H. Brown	Christ Church	C. D. England	Newnham
Cox	H. G. Wanklyn	St Hilda's	T. Rhys	Newnham

== See also ==
- The Boat Race 1927
