= The Boat Race 2018 =

Oxford–Cambridge boat races

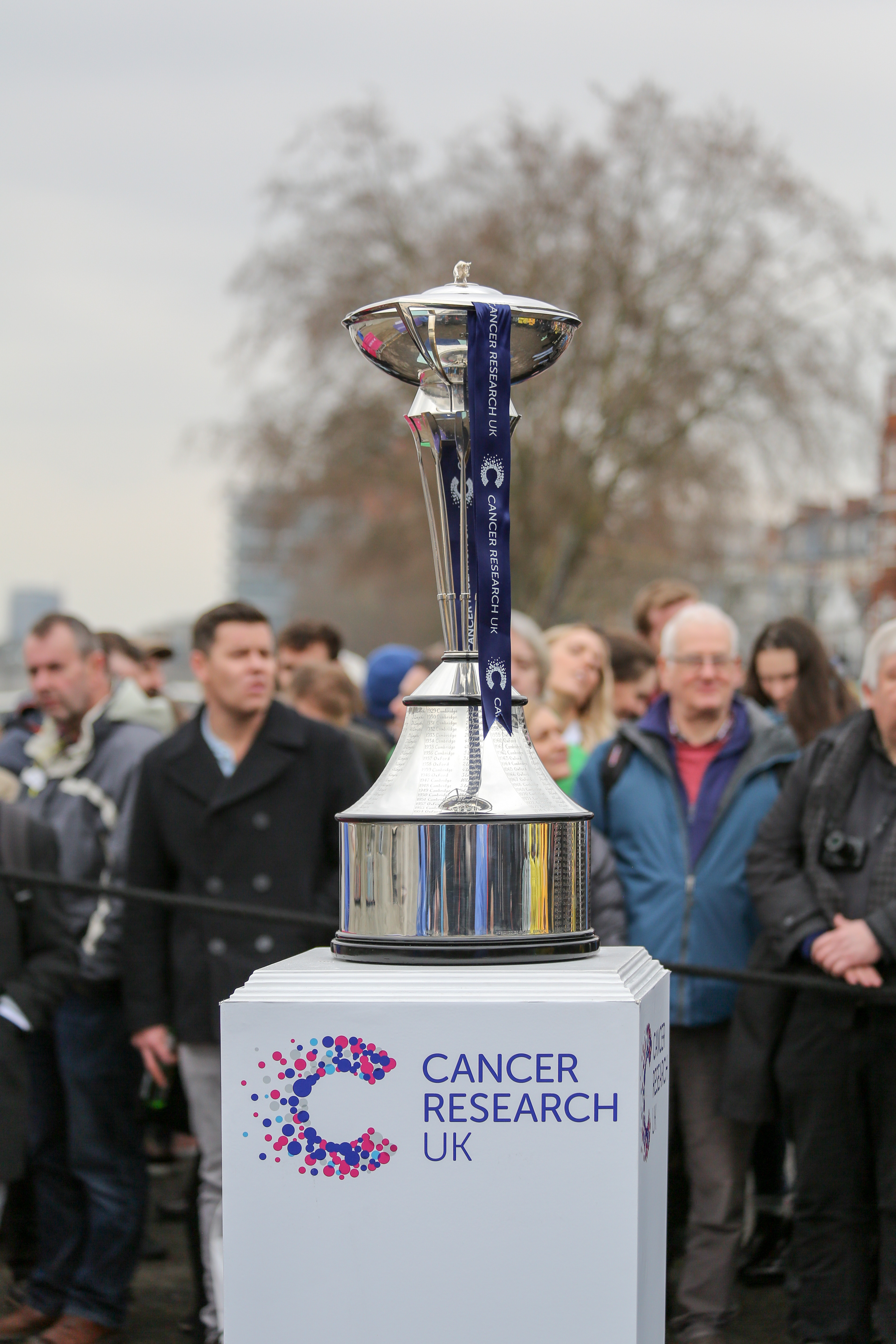
- The men's trophy
- Date: 24 March 2018

Men's race
- Winner: Cambridge
- Margin of victory: 3 lengths
- Winning time: 17 minutes 51 seconds
- Overall record (Cambridge–Oxford): 83–80
- Umpire: John Garrett

Women's race
- Winner: Cambridge
- Margin of victory: 7 lengths
- Winning time: 19 minutes 6 seconds
- Overall record (Cambridge–Oxford): 43–30
- Umpire: Matthew Pinsent

Reserves' races
- Men's winners: Goldie
- Women's winners: Blondie

The Boat Race 2018 (also known as The Cancer Research UK Boat Race for sponsorship reasons) was a rowing competition that was held on 24 March 2018. Held annually, The Boat Race is a side-by-side rowing race between crews from the universities of Oxford and Cambridge along a 4.2-mile (6.8 km) tidal stretch of the River Thames in south-west London. For the third time in the history of the event, the men's, women's and both reserves' races were all held on the Tideway on the same day.

The women's race was the first event of the day, and saw Cambridge lead from the start, eventually winning by a considerable margin to record their second consecutive victory, and taking the overall record in the Women's Boat Race to 43–30 in their favour. The men's race was the final event of the day and completed a whitewash as Cambridge won, their second victory in three years, and taking the overall record to 83–80 in their favour. In the women's reserve race, Cambridge's Blondie defeated Oxford's Osiris by nine lengths, their third consecutive victory. The men's reserve race was won by Cambridge's Goldie who defeated Oxford's Isis by a margin of four lengths.

The races were watched by around a quarter of a million spectators live, and were broadcast around the world by a variety of broadcasters. The two main races were also available for the second time as a live stream using YouTube.

== Background ==
The Championship Course along which, for the third time in the history of the event, the men's, women's and both reserves' races were conducted on the same day

The Boat Race is a side-by-side rowing competition between the University of Oxford (sometimes referred to as the "Dark Blues") and the University of Cambridge (sometimes referred to as the "Light Blues"). First held in 1829, the race takes place on the 4.2-mile (6.8 km) Championship Course, between Putney and Mortlake on the River Thames in south-west London. The rivalry is a major point of honour between the two universities; it is followed throughout the United Kingdom and broadcast worldwide. Oxford went into the race as champions, having won the 2017 race by a margin of one and a quarter lengths, with Cambridge leading overall with 82 victories to Oxford's 80 (excluding the 1877 race, officially a dead heat though claimed as a victory by the Oxford crew).

It was the third time in the history of The Boat Race that all four senior races – the men's, women's, men's reserves' and women's reserves' – were held on the same day and on the same course along the Tideway. Prior to 2015, the women's race, which first took place in 1927, was usually held at the Henley Boat Races along the 2,000-metre (2,200 yd) course. However, on at least two occasions in the interwar period, the women competed on the Thames between Chiswick and Kew. Cambridge's women went into the race as reigning champions, having won the 2017 race by 11 lengths, and led 42–30 overall.

For the sixth year, the men's race was sponsored by BNY Mellon while the women's race had BNY Mellon's subsidiary Newton Investment Management as sponsors. In January 2016, it was announced that the sponsors would be donating the title sponsorship to Cancer Research UK and that the 2016 event onwards would be retitled "The Cancer Research UK Boat Races". There is no monetary award for winning the race, as the journalist Roger Alton notes: "It's the last great amateur event: seven months of pain for no prize money".

The autumn reception was held at the Guildhall in London on 10 November 2017. As Cambridge's women had won the previous year's race, it was Oxford's responsibility to offer the traditional challenge to the Cambridge University Women's Boat Club (CUWBC). To that end, Katherine Erickson, President of Oxford University Women's Boat Club (OUWBC), challenged Daphne Martschenko, her Cambridge counterpart. Oxford's victory in the men's race meant that Hugo Ramambason, President of Cambridge University Boat Club (CUBC), challenged Iain Mandale, President of Oxford University Boat Club (OUBC).

The men's race was umpired by the former Light Blue rower John Garrett who represented Great Britain at the 1984, 1988 and 1992 Summer Olympics. He umpired men's race twice previously, in 2008 and 2012. He rowed for Lady Margaret Boat Club in The Boat Race in 1984 and 1985. The 73rd women's race was umpired by the multiple Olympic gold-medallist Matthew Pinsent. As well as rowing for Oxford in the 1990, 1991 and 1993 races, he was assistant umpire in the 2012 race before umpiring the 2013 race. The women's reserve race was presided over by former Dark Blue, Matt Smith, who rowed for Oxford in the 2001, 2002 and 2003 races. Richard Phelps, who rowed for Cambridge in the 1993, 1994 and 1995 races oversaw the men's reserve race.

The event was broadcast live in the United Kingdom on the BBC. Numerous broadcasters worldwide also showed the main races, including SuperSport across Africa and the EBU across Europe. It was also streamed live on BBC Online. For the second time, the men's and women's races were streamed live on YouTube.

== Coaches ==
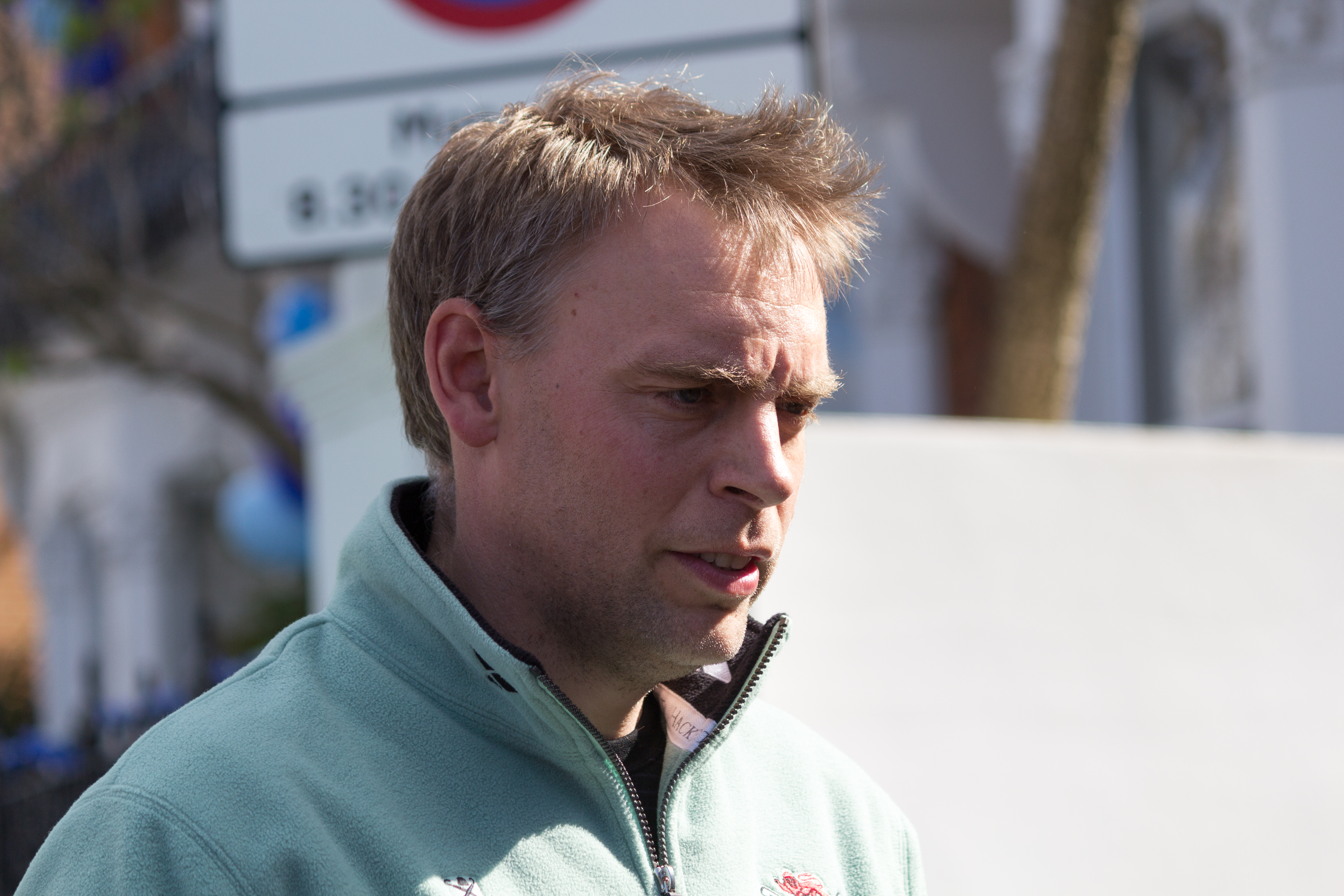
Cambridge men's coach Steve Trapmore (pictured in 2015)

The Cambridge men's crew coaching team was led by their chief coach Steve Trapmore, a gold medal-winning member of the men's eight at the 2000 Summer Olympics, who was appointed to the post in 2010. He was assisted by Richard Chambers, silver medallist in the men's lightweight coxless four at the 2012 Summer Olympics. Donald Legget, who rowed for the Light Blues in the 1963 and 1964 races acted as a supporting coach, along with coxing coach Henry Fieldman (who steered Cambridge in the 2013 race) and the medical officer Simon Owens. Sean Bowden was chief coach for Oxford, having been responsible for the senior men's crew since 1997, winning 12 from 18 races. He is a former Great Britain Olympic coach and coached the Light Blues in the 1993 and 1994 Boat Races.

OUWBC's chief coach was the former OUBC assistant coach Andy Nelder who previously worked with Bowden for eleven years. He was assisted by Jamie Kirkwood. Cambridge's women were coached by former Goldie coach Rob Baker who was assisted by Paddy Ryan.

== Trials ==
Dates for the trials, where crews are able to simulate the race proper on the Championship Course, were announced on 17 November 2017.

=== Women ===
Cambridge's women's trial took place on the Championship Course on 5 December, between the Harry Potter-themed boats Expecto Patronum and Wingardium Leviosa. The CUWBC president Daphne Martschenko was unavailable through illness to participate in the race, which was umpired by Matthew Pinsent. Wingardium Leviosa took the early lead but the crews were level by Barn Elms boathouse, before Leviosa pulled half a length ahead by Craven Cottage. Level once again as the crews passed Harrods Furniture Depository, Expecto Patronum made a push at Hammersmith Bridge, handling the rough conditions better than their opponents. With a clear water advantage by Chiswick Eyot, Expecto Patronum passed the finish line two lengths ahead.

Oxford's trial race was conducted on 21 January 2018, delayed from December through ill health of the rowers. The race was held in windy and wet conditions on the Tideway between Great Typhoon and Coursing River umpired by Pinsent. Coursing River made the better start from the Surrey station before Great Typhoon drew level, before taking advantage of the curve of the river and pulling ahead. An oar clash followed but a series of pushes from Great Typhoon saw them take the lead and push away under Barnes Bridge, to win by half a length.

=== Men ===
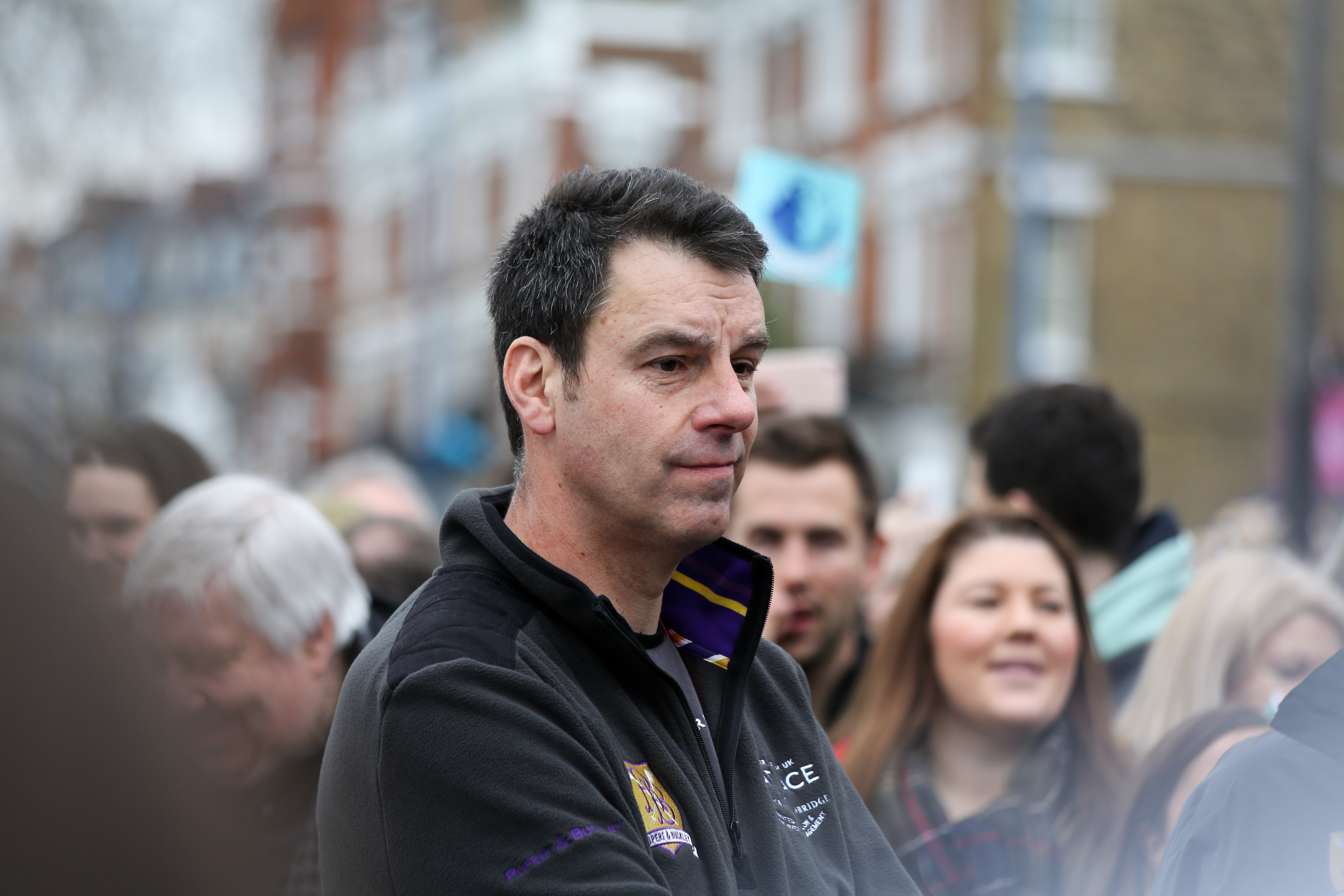
John Garrett umpired the Oxford trials and the men's Boat Race.

Cambridge's men's trial took place on the Championship Course on 5 December, between the boats Goblins and Goons. Goblins, starting from the Surrey station, took an early lead which they held until Goons drew level, and then began to pull away, as the crews passed below Hammersmith Bridge. Goblins responded, restored parity and then took the lead at the Bandstand. Despite each crew making a series of pushes, Goblins held a half-length lead under Barnes Bridge and maintained the advantage to the finish line.

The Oxford trial boats were named Strong and Stable, in reference to the Tory manifesto for the 2017 general election. They raced against one another along the Championship Course on 6 December 2017, umpired by John Garrett. Strong, starting from the Middlesex station, took an early lead and held a half-length advantage by the time the crews passed Craven Cottage. Garrett repeatedly warned both crews as they each infringed the racing line, and Strong capitalised on the advantage of the bend to be almost a length ahead. Stable fought back and were nearly level by the time they passed Harrods. Strong reacted to pull half a length ahead by Chiswick Eyot, extending to clear water by the Bandstand, and a final push at Barnes Bridge ensured them a two-length victory.

== Build-up ==
=== Women ===
CUWBC faced a crew from University of London Boat Club (ULBC) in two races on the Tideway umpired by Judith Packer on 17 February 2018. The first segment, from Putney Bridge to Hammersmith Bridge, was an easy victory for the Light Blues, winning by around five lengths. The second segment, from Chiswick Steps to the finish line, saw Cambridge quickly overcome their starting one-length deficit to take a clear water advantage under Barnes Bridge before ending as "clear winners".

OUWBC went up against Oxford Brookes University Boat Club (OBUBC) in a two-piece race on the Championship Course on 24 February 2018. Despite a strong start from OBUBC in the first segment, OUWBC held a lead of around a length by Craven Cottage and continued to pull away to a three-length victory at Chiswick Eyot. In the second segment, OUWBC took a slight early lead but OBUBC remained in contention, taking advantage of Middlesex bend, but could not catch the Dark Blues who passed the finish line with a lead of a couple of seats.

On 4 March 2018, OUWBC took on a crew from Molesey Boat Club in a race along a section of the Championship Course from the start to Chiswick Steps, umpired by Sarah Winckless. The Dark Blues held a three-seat advantage by the time the crews had passed the boathouses, and despite under-rating Molesey, continued to pull away to hold a clear water advantage and a three-length lead by Hammersmith Bridge which they extended to a five-length lead by Chiswick Steps.

=== Men ===
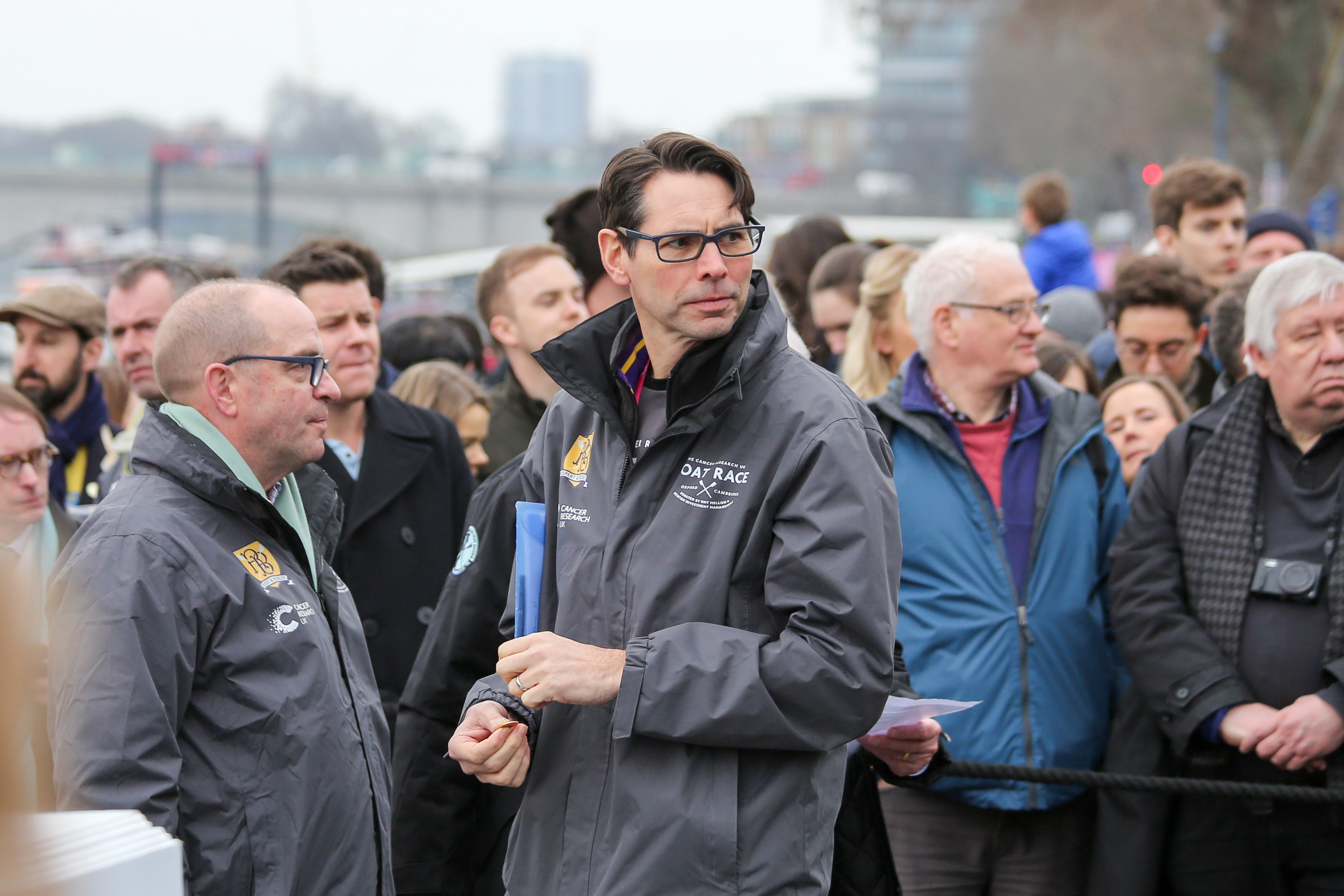
Richard Phelps umpired a race between OUBC and the University of London, and the men's reserve race.

CUBC faced a ULBC crew in a three-piece race along the Tideway umpired by Rob Clegg on 18 February 2018. The first section of the race was strongly contested with clashes in the early stages, with ULBC taking the lead, only for the Light Blues to draw level and then lead past Craven Cottage. The race concluded as Cambridge passed Harrods with a three length lead. The second segment from Harrods to the Bandstand saw Cambridge lead all the way, to win by several lengths. The final section of the race from Chiswick Eyot to the finish line, saw further oar clashes, but Cambridge controlled the situation, winning by more than two lengths.

On 4 March 2018, CUBC took part in a two-piece race against OBUBC. The first section, from the start line to Chiswick Steps, was won by one length by CUBC who led from the start. The second race, from Chiswick Eyot to the finishing line, was more robustly contested. CUBC took an early lead in difficult conditions, only to be overhauled by OBUBC who took a lead of a length from Barnes Bridge to the finish.

OUBC took on an OBUBC crew in two stages along the Championship Course on 24 February 2018, umpired by John Garrett. OBUBC made the better start in the first section, but OUBC drew level at the Town Buoy. Oxford Brookes started to pull away and held a length's advantage as the crews passed the Mile Post and into the headwind. OUBC coped with the conditions well and were just ahead by Hammersmith Bridge but Oxford Brookes took advantage of the stream to win by a length as the crews passed St Paul's School. The second section of the race saw early clashes from which OBUBC emerged with a length advantage. Although OUBC pushed to close the gap, OBUBC responded and pulled away to win by just over one length.

On 3 March 2018, OUBC faced a ULBC crew along a section of the Championship Course from the start line to Chiswick Steps, in a race umpired by Richard Phelps. Starting from the Middlesex station, the Dark Blues took an early lead and held a length's advantage by the time the crews passed Harrods. In an early attempt to claim the racing line, OUBC moved into ULBC's water and both crews were warned by Clegg to return to their station. Despite this, OUBC extended their lead and were several lengths clear by Hammersmith Bridge and were able to take advantage of clear water, winning the race by at least four lengths.

== Crews ==
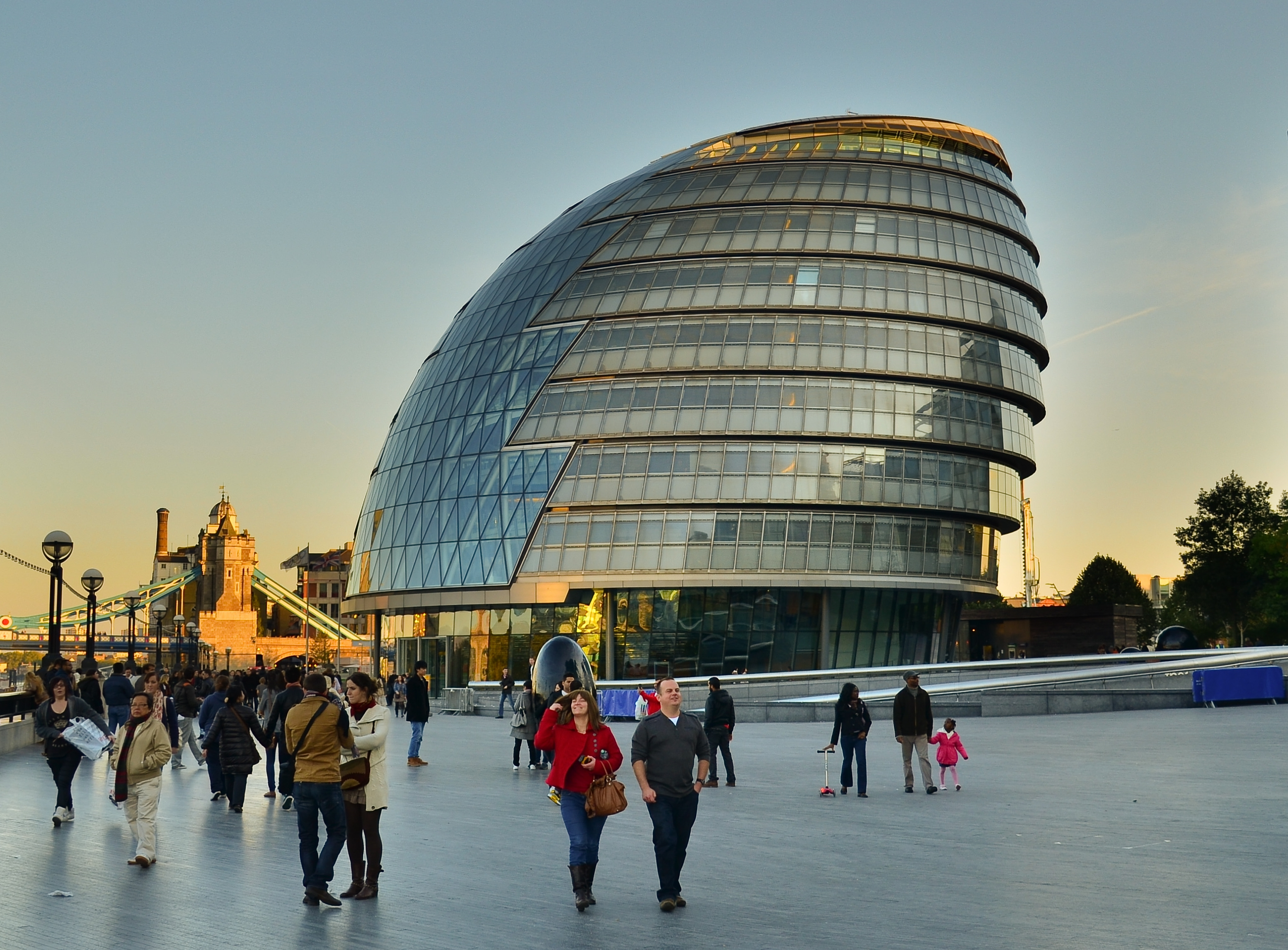
City Hall, London, where the official weigh-in took place

The official weigh-in for the crews took place at City Hall, London, on 26 February 2018.

=== Women ===
The Cambridge crew weighed an average of 73.0 kilograms (160.9 lb), 2.1 kilograms (4.6 lb) per rower more than their opponents. The Light Blues averaged 179 cm (5 ft 10 1/2 in) in height, 4 centimetres (1.6 in) more than Oxford. The Dark Blues featured one returning crew member, number four Alice Roberts, who rowed in the unsuccessful 2017 Oxford boat. The Cambridge crew included some experienced Boat Race rowers: Thea Zabell, Imogen Grant, Alice White and Myriam Goudet-Boukhatmi all rowed in the previous year's race. The Light Blues also featured the 2015 World Rowing Championships quad sculls gold medallist Olivia Coffey.

Seat	Oxford					Cambridge				
Seat	Name	Nationality	College	Height	Weight	Name	Nationality	College	Height	Weight
Bow	Renée Koolschijn	Dutch	Keble	180 cm (5 ft 11 in)	73.4 kg (162 lb)	Tricia Smith	British	Christ's	178 cm (5 ft 10 in)	70.3 kg (155 lb)
2	Katherine Erickson (P)	American	Wolfson	175 cm (5 ft 9 in)	69.6 kg (153 lb)	Imogen Grant	British	Trinity	168 cm (5 ft 6 in)	58.1 kg (128 lb)
3	Juliette Perry	British	Somerville	176.5 cm (5 ft 9 1/2 in)	73.4 kg (162 lb)	Kelsey Barolak	American	Homerton	182 cm (5 ft 11 1/2 in)	78.5 kg (173 lb)
4	Alice Roberts	British	St Edmund Hall	169 cm (5 ft 6 1/2 in)	67.0 kg (148 lb)	Thea Zabell	British	Downing	185 cm (6 ft 1 in)	77.5 kg (171 lb)
5	Morgan McGovern	American	St Catherine's	175 cm (5 ft 9 in)	72.1 kg (159 lb)	Paula Wesselmann	German	Jesus	176 cm (5 ft 9 1/2 in)	67.3 kg (148 lb)
6	Sara Kushma	American/British	Christ Church	178 cm (5 ft 10 in)	73.5 kg (162 lb)	Alice White	British/New Zealander	Homerton	177 cm (5 ft 9 1/2 in)	75.9 kg (167 lb)
7	Abigail Killen	British	St Cross	175 cm (5 ft 9 in)	70.4 kg (155 lb)	Myriam Goudet-Boukhatmi	French	Lucy Cavendish	183 cm (6 ft 0 in)	79.6 kg (175 lb)
Stroke	Beth Bridgman	British	St Hugh's	178 cm (5 ft 10 in)	67.8 kg (149 lb)	Olivia Coffey	American	Homerton	185 cm (6 ft 1 in)	76.6 kg (169 lb)
Cox	Jessica Buck	British	Green Templeton	153 cm (5 ft 0 in)	53.5 kg (118 lb)	Sophie Shapter	British	St Catharine's	164 cm (5 ft 4 1/2 in)	55.3 kg (122 lb)
Source: (P) – Boat Club president Daphne Martschenko is the president of CUWBC; she will row for Blondie.

=== Men ===
The Cambridge crew weighed an average of 89.8 kilograms (198 lb), 4.2 kilograms (9.3 lb) per rower more than their opponents, and averaged 195 cm (6 ft 5 in) in height, 6 centimetres (2.4 in) taller than Oxford. The Light Blue's number four, James Letten, at 208 cm (6 ft 10 in), was the tallest individual ever to have competed in The Boat Race. One member of the Oxford crew has previous Boat Race experience: stroke Vassilis Ragoussis featured in the successful 2017 Dark Blue boat. On 20 March 2018, it was announced that as a result of illness, number six Joshua Bugajski would withdraw from the race and be replaced by Isis rower Benedict Aldous. It was later revealed that Bugajski's departure was also related to disagreements with the Dark Blue coach Sean Bowden. Claas Mertens, the Oxford bow man, won gold at the 2015 World Rowing Championships with the German lightweight men's eight. Cambridge's crew contains four individuals who have featured in the Boat Race: Hugo Ramambason, Freddie Davidson and Letten participated in 2017, while Charles Fisher rowed in the 2016 race.

Seat	Oxford					Cambridge				
Seat	Name	Nationality	College	Height	Weight	Name	Nationality	College	Height	Weight
Bow	Claas Mertens	German	Christ Church	180 cm (5 ft 11 in)	73.9 kg (163 lb)	Charles Fisher	British	St John's	198 cm (6 ft 6 in)	90.7 kg (200 lb)
2	Vassilis Ragoussis	British/Greek	Linacre	193 cm (6 ft 4 in)	88.2 kg (194 lb)	Patrick Elwood	British	Magdalene	192 cm (6 ft 3 1/2 in)	85.3 kg (188 lb)
3	Will Cahill	South African	Christ Church	183 cm (6 ft 0 in)	84.3 kg (186 lb)	James Letten	American	Hughes Hall	208 cm (6 ft 10 in)	106.5 kg (235 lb)
4	Anders Weiss	American	St Hugh's	195.5 cm (6 ft 5 in)	91.5 kg (202 lb)	Dara Alizadeh	Bermudian/British/ American/Iranian	Hughes Hall	192 cm (6 ft 3 1/2 in)	90.1 kg (199 lb)
5	Will Geffen	British	Keble	186 cm (6 ft 1 in)	87.1 kg (192 lb)	Spencer Furey	American	Jesus	193 cm (6 ft 4 in)	89.5 kg (197 lb)
6	Benedict Aldous	British	Christ Church	195 cm (6 ft 5 in)	95.6 kg (211 lb)	Finn Meeks	American	Hughes Hall	191 cm (6 ft 3 in)	87.3 kg (192 lb)
7	Iain Mandale (P)	British	St Edmund Hall	182 cm (5 ft 11 1/2 in)	75.1 kg (166 lb)	Rob Hurn	British	St Edmund's	194 cm (6 ft 4 1/2 in)	86.5 kg (191 lb)
Stroke	Felix Drinkall	British	Lady Margaret Hall	196 cm (6 ft 5 in)	83.8 kg (185 lb)	Freddie Davidson	British	Emmanuel	189 cm (6 ft 2 1/2 in)	82.6 kg (182 lb)
Cox	Zachary Thomas Johnson	British	Lady Margaret Hall	182 cm (5 ft 11 1/2 in)	54.7 kg (121 lb)	Hugo Ramambason (P)	British/French	Trinity	175 cm (5 ft 9 in)	55.3 kg (122 lb)
Source: (P) – Boat Club president

== Pre-race ==
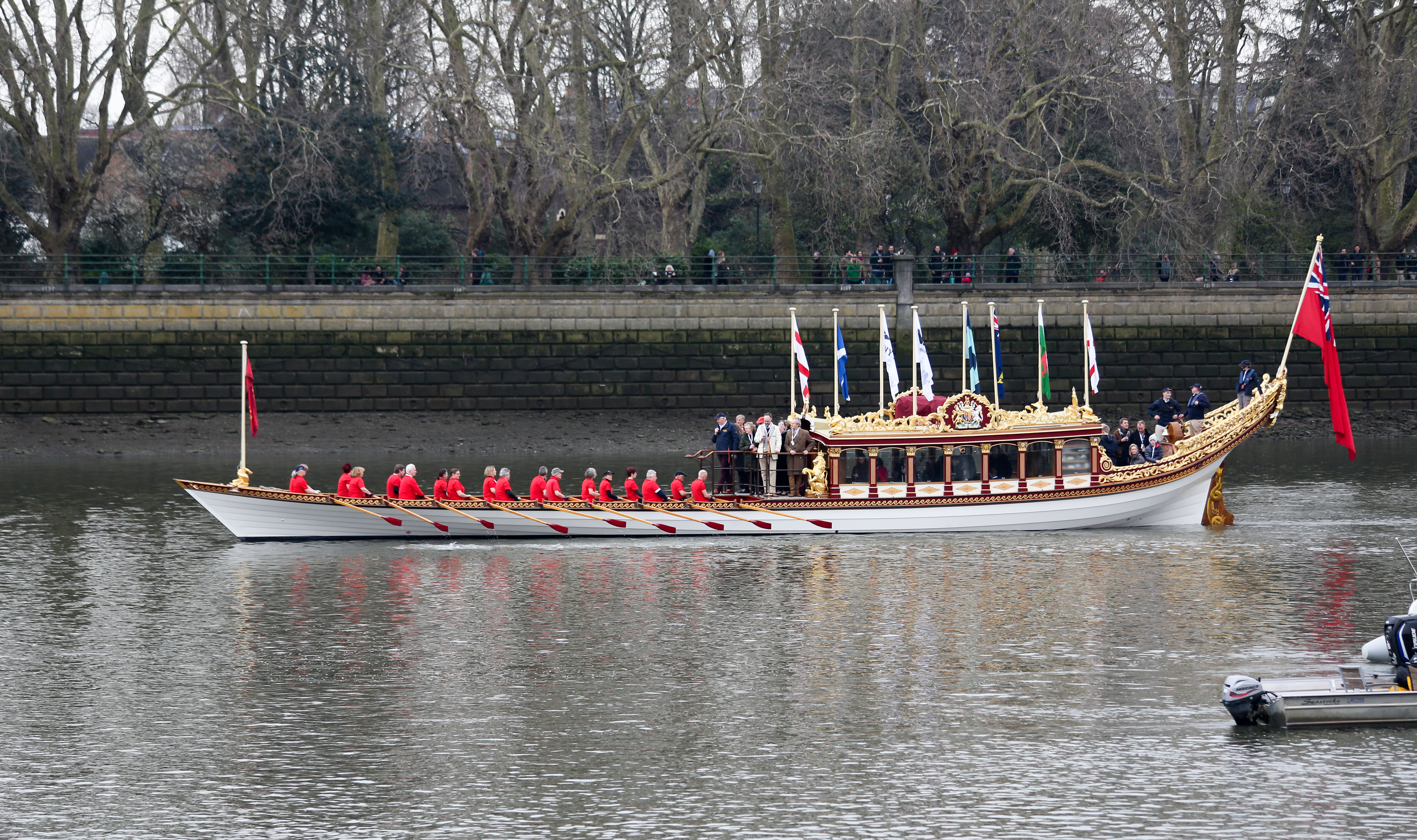
Gloriana led the Boat Race flotilla along the Tideway before the races.

Two days before the race, both the Blues boats and the reserve boats practised their starts from the stakeboats on the Championship Course. On the same day, two BBC television cameras located on Putney Bridge and Barnes Bridge were targeted by thieves; their attempts at Putney were thwarted by an off-duty policeman and a Royal National Lifeboat Institution crew, but the gang escaped with one of the cameras on Barnes Bridge.

Cambridge were pre-race favourites to win both the men's and women's senior races.

The Queen's barge Gloriana led a procession of traditional craft along the course. These included the waterman's cutters used for the Oxbridge Waterman's Challenge.

== Races ==
The races were held on 24 March 2018. Weather was overcast with light winds.

=== Reserves ===
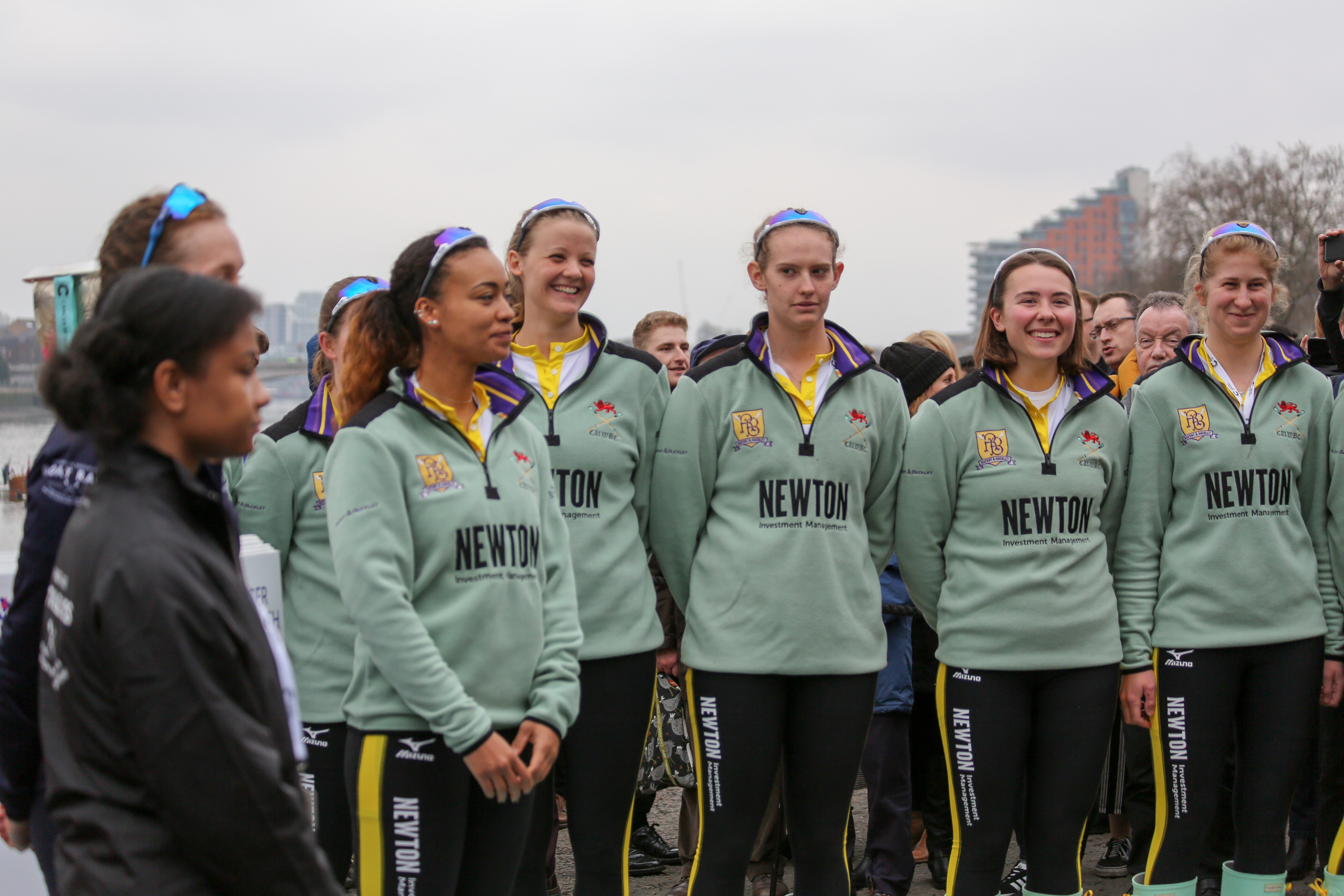
Members of the victorious Blondie crew, including CUWBC president Daphne Martschenko (left)

Blondie won the women's reserve boat race which was held after the conclusion of the Women's Boat Race by nine lengths in a time of 19 minutes 45 seconds. Already six seconds ahead at the Mile Post, Blondie continued to pull away to be twelve seconds ahead by Hammersmith Bridge before passing the finishing post in 19 minutes 45 seconds, 27 seconds ahead of Osiris. It was Blondie's third consecutive victory, and took the overall tally (since 1968) to 24–20 in Cambridge's favour.

Goldie won the men's reserve race, which was held after the women's reserve race and before the men's race. Five seconds ahead at the Mile Post, the Light Blue reserves were warned after a clash of oars, and Isis reduced the gap to three seconds by Hammersmith Bridge. Goldie were clear of Isis by Barnes Bridge with a seven-second lead, and maintained that advantage as they crossed the finish line in a time of 18 minutes 12 seconds. It was Goldie's first victory since 2010 and took the overall tally in the event to 30–24 in their favour.

=== Women's ===
The women's race started at 4:31 p.m. Greenwich Mean Time (GMT). CUWBC won the toss and elected to start from the Surrey side of the river, handing the Middlesex side to Oxford. Cambridge made the better start taking an early lead and were around a half of a length ahead after the first minute of the race. By Craven Cottage, and in spite of Oxford having the advantage of the bend in the river, the Light Blues were ahead by a length. At the Mile Post, Cambridge held a clear water advantage, two lengths ahead. The Light Blues passed under Hammersmith Bridge with a three-length lead. At Chiswick Steps, Oxford were fifteen seconds behind, and a further five down at Barnes Bridge. Cambridge passed the finishing post in a time of 19 minutes 6 seconds, around seven lengths ahead of Oxford. It was Cambridge's second consecutive victory but only their third win in eleven years, and took the overall record in the event to 43–30 in their favour.

=== Men's ===
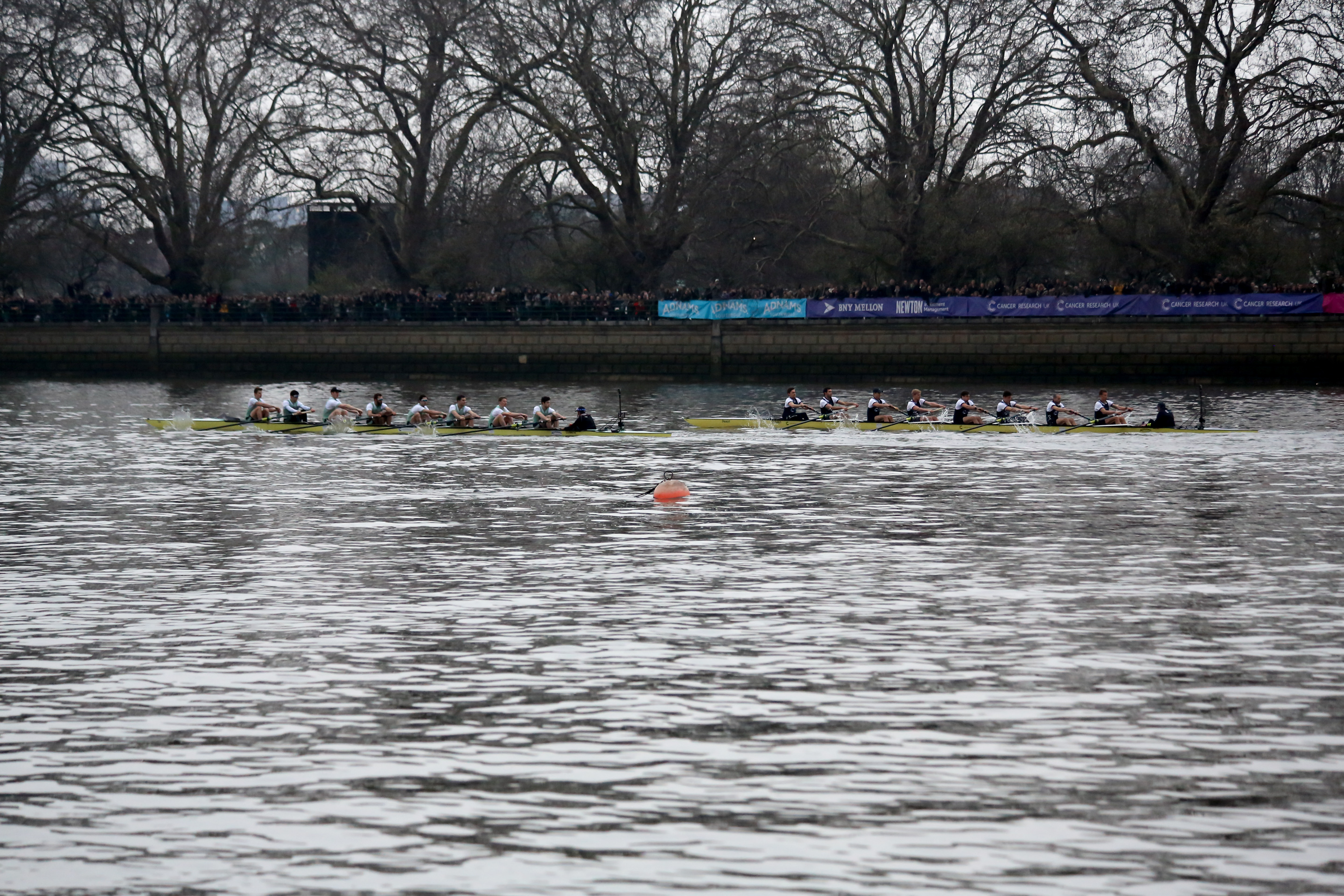
Cambridge led Oxford throughout the whole race.

The men's race started at 5.33 pm. GMT in very "gloomy conditions". The Light Blues won the toss and elected to start from the Surrey side of the river. Oxford made the better start and were quickly a canvas ahead, but Cambridge restored parity within 40 seconds, going on to take a third of a length lead themselves. Cambridge received several warnings from the umpire John Garrett for encroaching into Oxford's water, forcing them to move back towards their station, but were still over a length ahead by Craven Cottage. The Light Blues passed the Mile Post five seconds ahead, and shot Hammersmith Bridge with a lead of four lengths. They maintained their lead of 12 seconds as they passed Chiswick Steps. The Dark Blues reduced the Cambridge lead to eleven seconds by Barnes Bridge, but Cambridge passed the finishing line in 17 minutes 51 seconds, three lengths ahead of Oxford. It was Cambridge's second victory in the last three years, and took the overall record in the event to 83–80 in their favour.

== Reactions ==
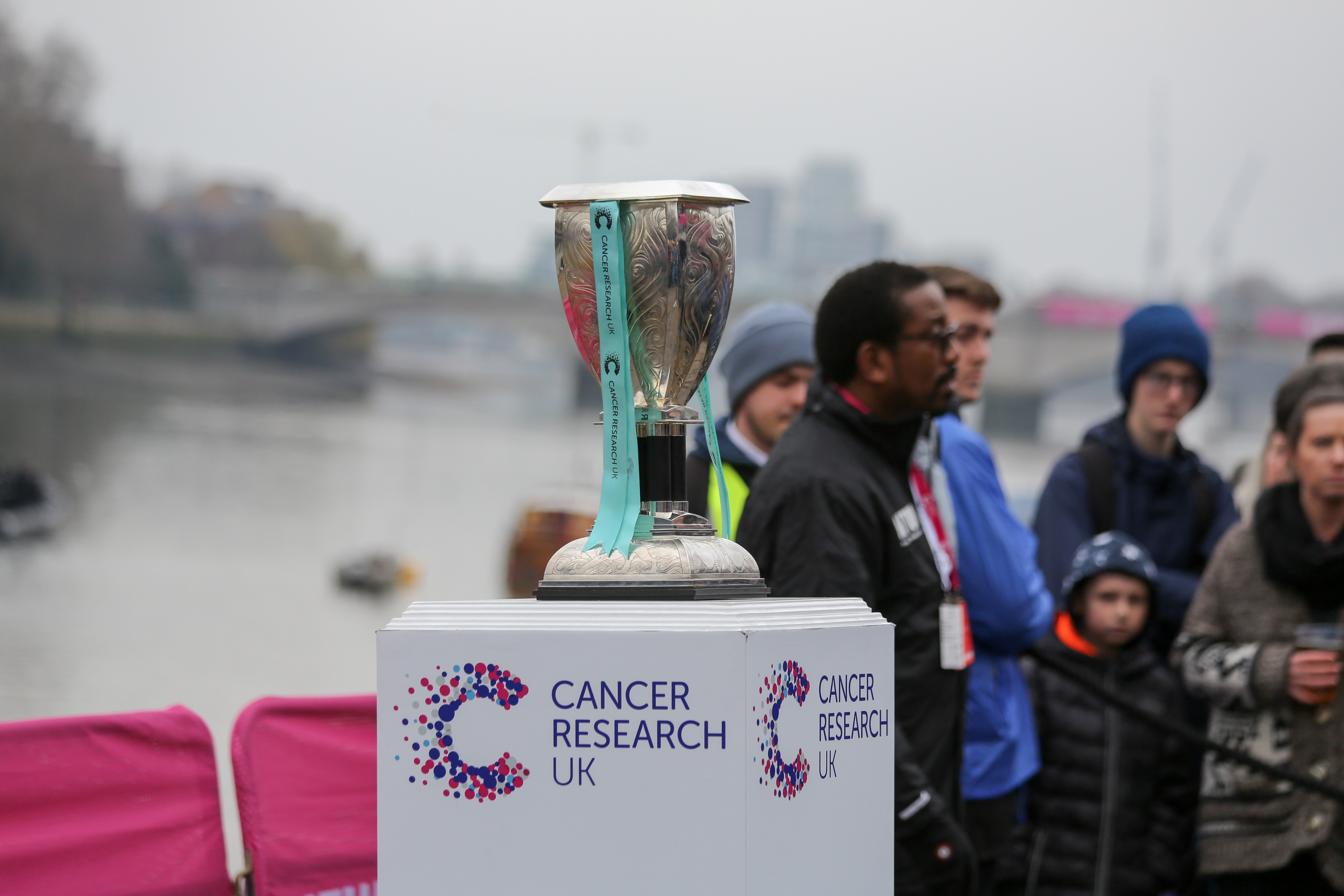
The Women's Boat Race trophy

CUWBC's cox Sophie Shapter said "We just knew we had to go out there and do a job" while OUWBC's president Katherine Erickson expressed that she was proud of her crew, many of whom had learnt to row at Oxford. James Letten remarked that his Cambridge crew were "on the money" and had "stepped up and delivered". In CUBC's Steve Trapmore's final Boat Race before moving to Team GB Olympic Rowing as a high performance coach, he admitted that "the boys really stepped up and delivered".

As the men's senior crews passed below Hammersmith Bridge, a banner was unfurled by the Cambridge Zero Carbon Society and smoke flares were let off, to protest against investment in fossil fuel companies by the two universities. Although the banner was not clear to viewers during the live race coverage on the BBC, commentator Andrew Cotter remarked "flares at the boat race, whatever next?"
