= Vassilis Ragoussis =

Greek-British rower

Personal information
- Nationality: British
- Born: April 26, 1993 (age 33)
- Height: 194 cm (6 ft 4 in)
- Weight: 86.6 kg (191 lb)

Sport
- Country: Great Britain
- Sport: Rowing
- College team: Boston University
- Club: Oxford University Boat Club

Vassilis Ragoussis (born 1993) is a Greek-British rower.

== Profile ==
While studying at Abingdon School, Ragoussis gained colours for the Abingdon School Boat Club. He was part of the team that won the gold medal at the National Schools Regatta and also the Princess Elizabeth Cup at the Henley Royal Regatta. After leaving Abingdon in 2011 he attended Boston University and Linacre College, Oxford.

== Rowing ==
In 2017, Ragousssis was selected in the stroke seat of the Oxford boat at the 2017 Boat Race, along with fellow Old Abingdonians Oliver Cook and Jamie Cook. Oxford went on to win the race.

He was selected again in 2018 for the Oxford crew which ended with a win for Cambridge.

He has also represented Great Britain at the 2011 World Rowing Junior Championships at Eton in England. In 2016, he earned Bronze at the Eastern Sprints in the Boston University 2V.
