= Claas Mertens =

German rower

Personal information
- Born: 2 January 1992 (age 34)
- Height: 180 cm (5 ft 11 in)
- Weight: 71 kg (157 lb)

Sport
- Sport: Rowing
Medal record
Men's rowing
Representing Germany
World Championships
Gold medal – first place	2015 Aiguebelette	Lwt eight
Bronze medal – third place	2012 Trakai	Lwt 4x

Claas Mertens (born 2 January 1992) is a German lightweight rower. He won a gold medal at the 2015 World Rowing Championships in Aiguebelette with the lightweight men's eight. He also won ten German National Championship titles. In 2018 Mertens represented Oxford in the Oxford-Cambridge Boat Race. He was educated at Shrewsbury School then Harvard University, University of St. Gallen and Christ Church, Oxford. He is an academic researcher in the field of international political economy.
