= Jamie Cook (rower) =

British rower

Personal information
- Nationality: British
- Born: 2 July 1992 (age 32)
- Height: 188 cm (6 ft 2 in)
- Weight: 85 kg (187 lb)

Sport
- Country: Great Britain
- Sport: Rowing
- Club: Oxford University Boat Club

James Edward Timothy Cook (born 1992) is a former British rower.

== Profile ==
Whilst in education at Abingdon School he gained colours for the Abingdon School Boat Club. After leaving Abingdon in 2010 he attended the University College London and then St Cross College at Oxford.

He is the brother of British rower Oliver Cook.

== Rowing ==
In 2015 he was selected for the Oxford dark blue boat at the world renowned Boat Race finishing up on the winning side. A second appearance as in 2016 ensued. In addition to this he won the prestigious Parmigiani Spirit Award in 2013 and represented the Great Britain's under-23 men's eight crew at the 2013 World Rowing Championships in Linz, Austria. One year later he represented the under-23 men's fours at 2014 World Rowing Championships in Varese, Italy.

In 2017 he was named in the Oxford eight for the third time and will take part in the 2017 boat race alongside his brother Ollie and fellow Old Abingdonian Vassilis Ragoussis. Oxford won the race.

== See also ==
- List of Old Abingdonians
