= The Boat Races 2017 =

2017 boat races between Oxford and Cambridge universities

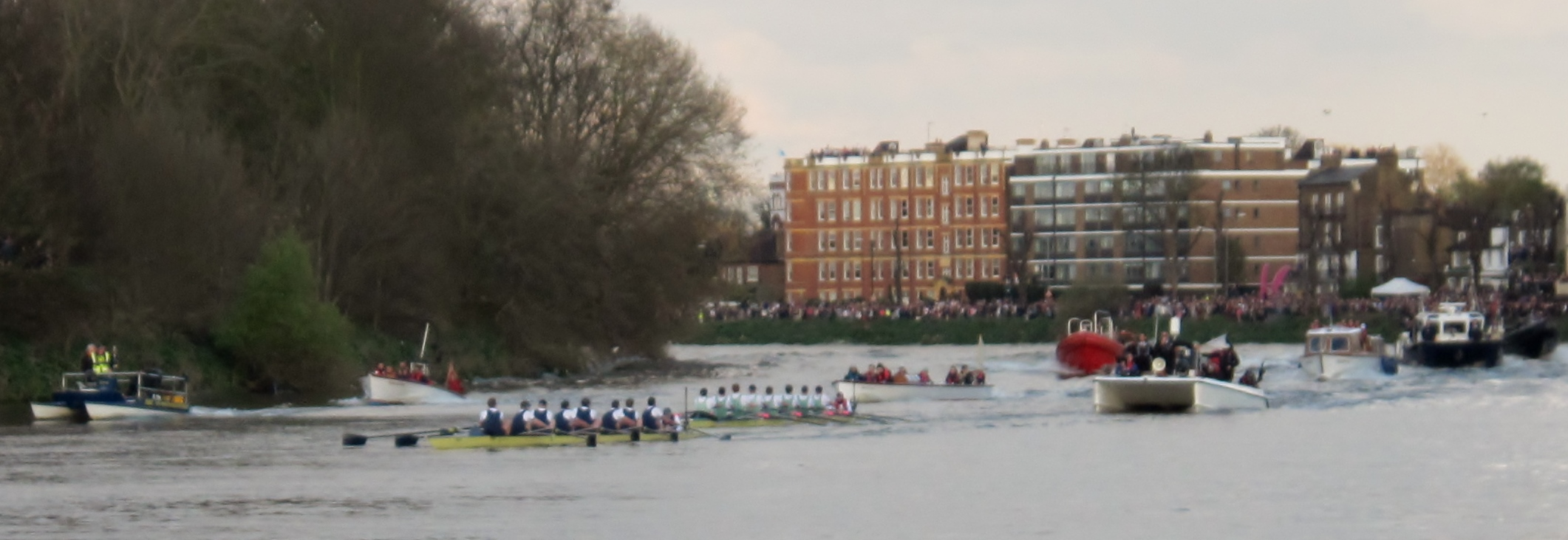
- Oxford leading Cambridge as they come round the last bend to approach the finish
- Date: 2 April 2017

Men's race
- Winner: Oxford
- Margin of victory: 1 1/4 lengths
- Winning time: 16 minutes 59 seconds
- Overall record (Cambridge–Oxford): 82–80
- Umpire: Matthew Pinsent

Women's race
- Winner: Cambridge
- Margin of victory: 11 lengths
- Winning time: 18 minutes 34 seconds
- Overall record (Cambridge–Oxford): 42–30
- Umpire: Sarah Winckless

Reserves' races
- Men's winners: Isis
- Women's winners: Blondie

The Boat Races 2017 (also known as The Cancer Research UK Boat Races for the purposes of sponsorship) took place on 2 April 2017. Held annually, the Boat Race is a side-by-side rowing race between crews from the universities of Oxford and Cambridge along a 4.2-mile (6.8 km) tidal stretch of the River Thames in south-west London. For the second time in the history of the event, the men's, women's and both reserves' races were all held on the Tideway on the same day.

In the men's reserve race, Cambridge's Goldie were beaten by Oxford's Isis, their seventh consecutive defeat. In the women's reserve race, Cambridge's Blondie defeated Oxford's Osiris, their second consecutive victory. In the women's race, Cambridge won by a large margin following a disastrous start by the Oxford boat. Their second win in the past ten years, it took Cambridge's advantage in the overall standings to 42–30. The Oxford men's boat won their race after leading from the start, their fourth victory in five years and taking the overall record in the event to 82–80 in Cambridge's favour.

The races were watched by around a quarter of a million spectators live, more than five million domestic television viewers, and were broadcast around the world by a variety of broadcasters. The two main races were also available for the first time as a live stream using YouTube.

== Background ==
The Championship Course along which, for the second time in the history of the event, the men's, women's and both reserves' races were conducted on the same day

The Boat Race is a side-by-side rowing competition between the University of Oxford (sometimes referred to as the "Dark Blues") and the University of Cambridge (sometimes referred to as the "Light Blues"). First held in 1829, the race takes place on the 4.2-mile (6.8 km) Championship Course, between Putney and Mortlake on the River Thames in south-west London. The rivalry is a major point of honour between the two universities; it is followed throughout the United Kingdom and broadcast worldwide. Cambridge went into the men's race as champions, having won the 2016 race by a margin of two and a half lengths, and leading overall with 82 victories to Oxford's 79 (excluding the 1877 race, officially a dead heat though claimed as a victory by the Oxford crew).

It was the second time in the history of the Boat Race that all four senior races – the men's, women's, men's reserves' and women's reserves' – were held on the same day and on the same course along the Tideway. Prior to 2015, the women's race, which first took place in 1927, was usually held at the Henley Boat Races along the 2,000-metre (2,200 yd) course. However, on at least two occasions in the interwar period, the women competed on the Thames between Chiswick and Kew. The Oxford women went into the race as reigning champions, having won the 2016 race by 24 lengths, with Cambridge leading 41–30 overall. For the fifth year, BNY Mellon sponsored the men's race, while Newton Investment Management, a Mellon subsidiary, sponsored the women's race. In January 2016, it was announced that the sponsors would be donating the title sponsorship to Cancer Research UK and that the 2016 event was retitled "The Cancer Research UK Boat Races". There is no monetary award for winning the race, as the journalist Roger Alton notes: "It's the last great amateur event: seven months of pain for no prize money".

The autumn reception was held at the Guildhall in London on 3 November 2016. As Oxford's women had won the previous year's race, it was Cambridge's responsibility to offer the traditional challenge to the Oxford University Women's Boat Club (OUWBC). To that end, Ashton Brown, President of Cambridge University Women's Boat Club (CUWBC), challenged Isabell Von Loga, her Oxford counterpart. Cambridge's victory in the men's race meant that Michael Di Santo, President of Oxford University Boat Club (OUBC), challenged Lance Tredell, President of Cambridge University Boat Club (CUBC).

The men's race was umpired for the second time by the Olympic gold medallist Matthew Pinsent, who won the Boat Race himself with Oxford in the 1990 and 1991 races before losing (as President) in the 1993 race. Pinsent was the assistant umpire in the 2012 race and umpired the OUBC victory in the 2013 race. The umpire for the women's race was Sarah Winckless, who became the first woman to umpire a Boat Race on the Tideway. Winckless won a bronze medal in the women's double sculls at the 2004 Summer Olympics and umpired the men's reserve's race in 2016.

The event was broadcast live in the United Kingdom on the BBC, and received a viewership of 5.5 million. Numerous broadcasters worldwide also showed the main races, including SuperSport across Africa, the EBU across Europe, Sky México across Central America, TSN in Canada and Fox Sports in Australia. It was also streamed live on BBC Online. For the first time, the men's and women's races were streamed live on YouTube.

== Coaches ==
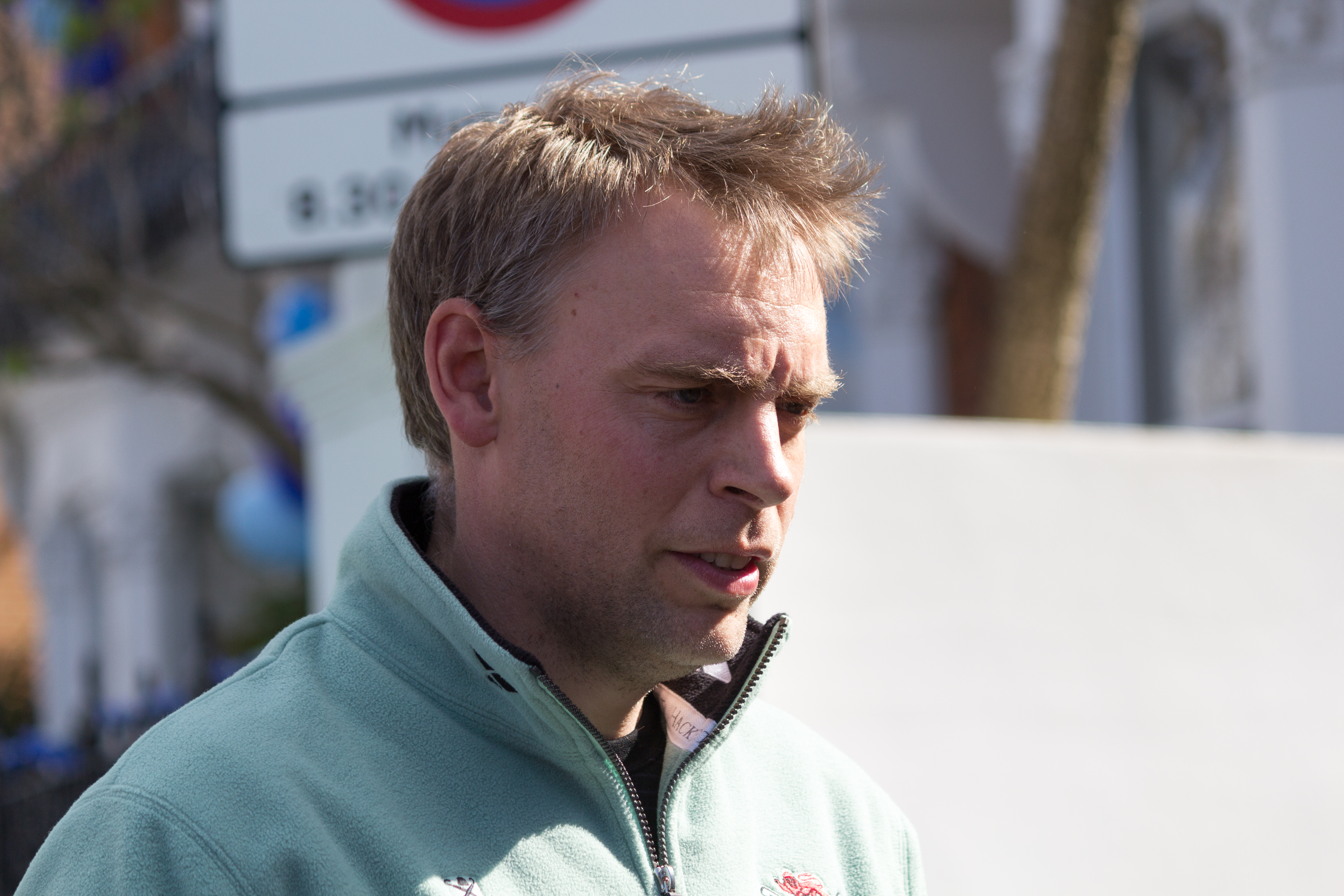
Cambridge men's coach Steve Trapmore

The Cambridge men's crew coaching team was led by their chief coach Steve Trapmore. Trapmore, a gold medal-winning member of the men's eight at the 2000 Summer Olympics, was appointed to the post in 2010. He was assisted by Richard Chambers, silver medallist in the men's lightweight coxless four at the 2012 Summer Olympics. Donald Legget, who rowed for the Light Blues in the 1963 and 1964 races, acted as a supporting coach, along with coxing coach Henry Fieldman (who steered Cambridge in the 2013 race) and the medical officer Simon Owens. Sean Bowden was chief coach for Oxford, having been responsible for the senior men's crew since 1997, winning 11 from 17 races. He is a former Great Britain Olympic coach and coached the Light Blues in the 1993 and 1994 Boat Races. His assistant coach was Andy Nelder, who has coached the senior boat since 2006.

Ali Williams, the former Canadian international cox, was OUWBC's chief coach, a new role for her; she had been head coach at the University of Alberta. She was assisted by Jamie Kirkwood. Cambridge's women were coached by the former Goldie coach Rob Baker who was assisted by Paddy Ryan and Nick Acock, along with the former Light Blue cox Peter Rudge.

== Trials ==
Dates for the trials, where crews are able to simulate the race proper on the Championship Course, were announced on 16 November 2016. Oxford's two senior crews rowed on 30 November, while Cambridge's crews raced on 12 December.

=== Women ===
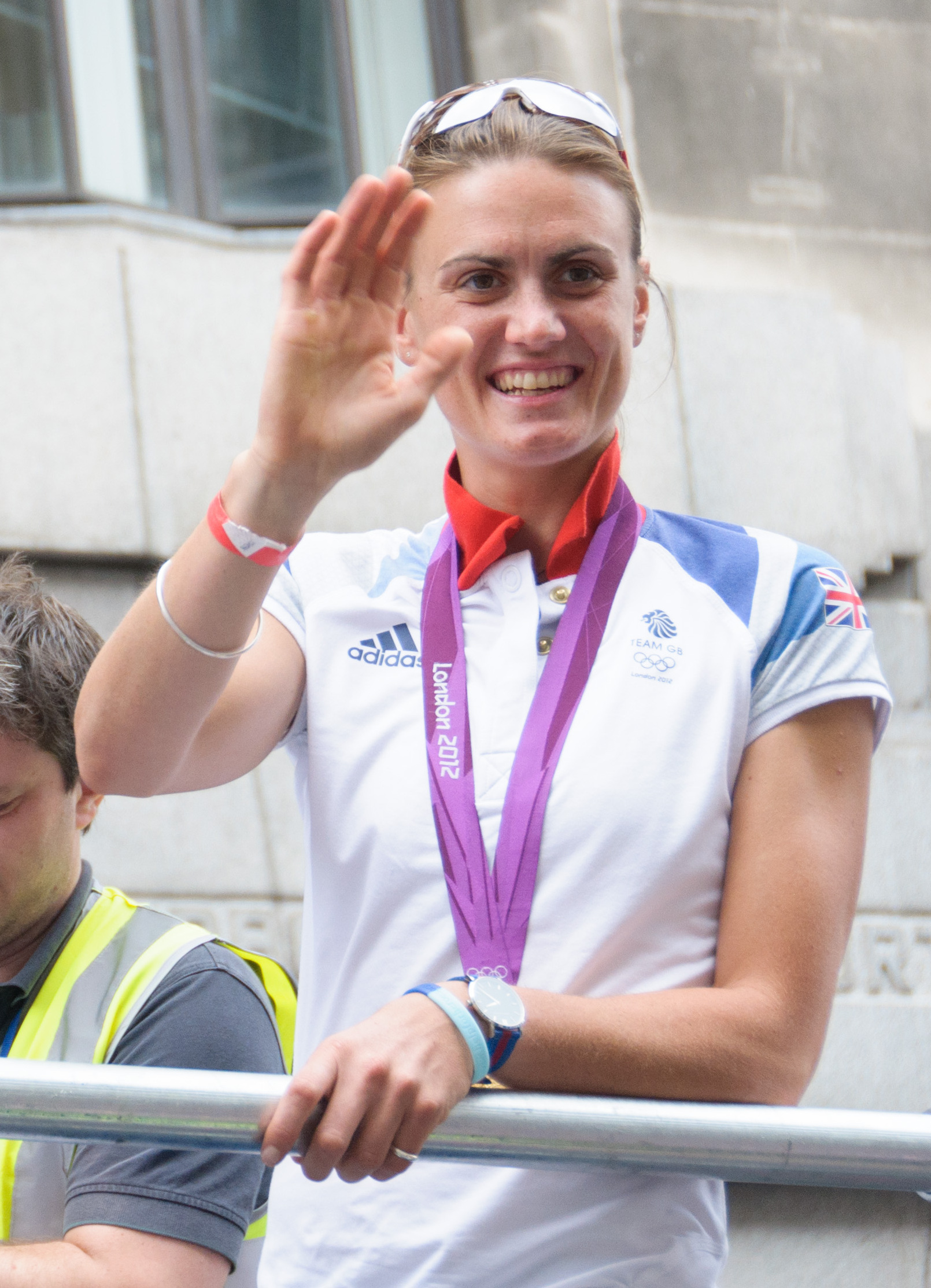
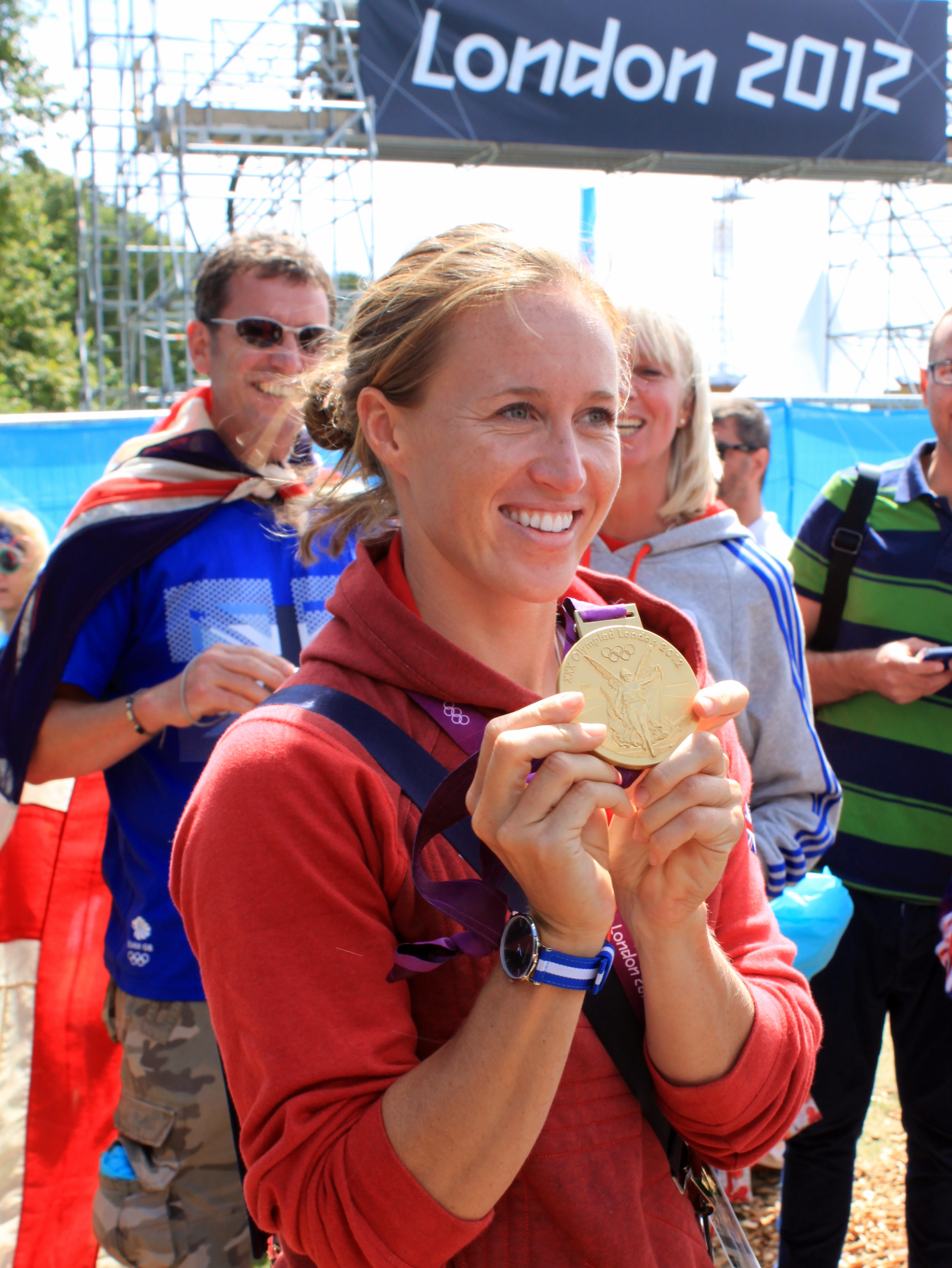
Oxford's women's trial boats were named after Heather Stanning (left) and Helen Glover (right), both Olympic gold medallists in 2012.

Oxford's women's trials took place on a section of the Championship Course on 30 November 2016, between the Oxford boats, Heather and Helen, named after the gold medal-winning British Olympic pairing of Heather Stanning and Helen Glover. In cold conditions, the women's race was overseen by Winckless, who soon warned Helen for encroachment after Heather took a slim early lead. Helen took the lead around Fulham before Heather accelerated away at the Mile Post, and were two lengths ahead by St Paul's boathouse. Both crews were warned by the umpire as they approached Barnes Bridge, and Helen began to narrow the gap. Closing in on Chiswick Bridge, the finishing line, the boats began to overlap and in a sprint finish, Helen won "a narrow victory".

Cambridge's women's trials were held on 12 December 2016, on a stretch of the Championship Course. The trial boats were named Hallam and Needs after former coaches Ed Hallam and Ron Needs, both of whom had died earlier in the year. Hallam took an early lead and were nearly a length up by Fulham. Both crews were warned for encroachment before Hallam extended their lead to two lengths by the time the boats passed below Barnes Bridge. Both Needs and Hallam increased their rate in the final 500 m of the race, but Hallam pulled further away to pass the finish line at the University Post by four lengths.

=== Men ===
Oxford's men's trials took place on a section of the Championship Course on 30 November 2016, between the Oxford boats, Acer and Daniel, named after their former cox Acer Nethercott and their long-term coach Daniel Topolski, both of whom had died from cancer. The race was umpired by Pinsent. Acer took an early lead but Daniel was level by Barn Elms boathouse. Acer continued to pull away despite multiple warnings from Pinsent, and were almost a length up at Fulham. The gap narrowed as Daniel pushed on and by Hammersmith Bridge, the crews converged, and blades clashed. Daniel's crew handled the situation the better and took a half-length lead by Chiswick Eyot. By Barnes the lead was three lengths, with Daniel crossing the finish line at the University of London boathouse four lengths ahead.

The Cambridge men's trial boats were named One T and Two G's in honour of their coach Donald Legget who had served the club for fifty years. One T took the lead and were 3/4 length ahead by the end of the boathouses. Two G's pushed on and closed the gap to a quarter of a length by the time the crews passed below Hammersmith Bridge. In rough conditions, One T extended their lead to a length by Barnes Bridge. A sprint finish ensued, with Two G's closing the gap to half a length, before One T pulled away again to lead by 1 1/4 lengths by the time the boats passed the finishing line at the University Post.

== Build-up ==
=== Women ===
OUWBC faced a crew from Oxford Brookes University Boat Club (OBUBC) in two races along the Championship Course on 19 February. The first piece, from Putney Bridge to Hammersmith Bridge, saw OBUBC make the better start, but OUWBC took the lead at Craven Cottage. A length ahead at the Mile Post, the Dark Blues were comfortable winners. The second race, from Hammersmith to Barnes Bridge followed a similar pattern with OBUBC taking an early lead, and OUWBC pushing through for the win. On 19 March, the Dark Blues took on a crew from Molesey in two races on the Tideway. A tight start during which Winckless, the umpire, warned both crews, Molesey took a marginal lead. OUWBC were back on level terms by the Mile Post and in calmer conditions, pushed away from Molesey to be a length up by Harrods. Pulling further ahead, the Dark Blues won by three lengths. The second race saw Molesey take the lead once again, and were soon a length up. Oxford's attempts to reduce the deficit came to no avail and Molesey won by just short of one length.

Cambridge took on University of London Boat Club (UL) on 19 February along two sections of the Championship Course. CUWBC won the first piece, from Putney to Hammersmith, convincingly. Leading almost from the start, the Light Blues passed below Hammersmith Bridge more than three lengths ahead. The second race, from Chiswick Steps to the Finishing Post saw UL given a clear-water headstart. Despite that, CUWBC rowed strongly throughout to win by at least three lengths.

=== Men ===
The first race in the build-up to The Boat Races for CUBC was against OBUBC on 29 January 2017 along two sections of the Championship Course. The first race was from Putney Bridge to Chiswick Eyot; OBUBC took an early lead before Cambridge led at Hammersmith. A final push from OBUBC resulted in a drawn race. The second race, from Chiswick Eyot to the University Post, was a one-sided affair with OBUBC leading from the start and gradually pulling away to win by two lengths. Goldie also faced an Oxford Brookes crew over two pieces, losing them both. Cambridge faced an Italian national crew on 18 March in two pieces on the Championship Course. The first race saw the Italians make the better start, and despite steering off-course, they maintained their lead in rough weather under Hammersmith Bridge. CUBC pushed hard but were unable to catch the Italians, losing by one quarter of a length. The second piece was conducted in blustery conditions between Chiswick Eyot and Chiswick Bridge. A close start saw both crews level after a minute, but the Light Blues pulled away after Barnes Bridge, and won by four lengths.

Oxford started their preparations on 26 February with a two-piece contest against OBUBC. In poor weather conditions, OUBC comfortably won the first section, leading from beginning to end. OUBC won the much closer second race "by a seat". On 18 March, OUBC faced Leander in a race from start of the Championship Course to the Chiswick Steps. The Dark Blues made a good start, leading by a length at Craven Cottage. At the Mile Post, Oxford started to move across in front of Leander and by the time the crews passed below Hammersmith Bridge, the Dark Blues were fully in front and maintained their lead. Oxford responded to numerous pushes by Leander and crossed the finish line with "a lead of several lengths".

== Crews ==
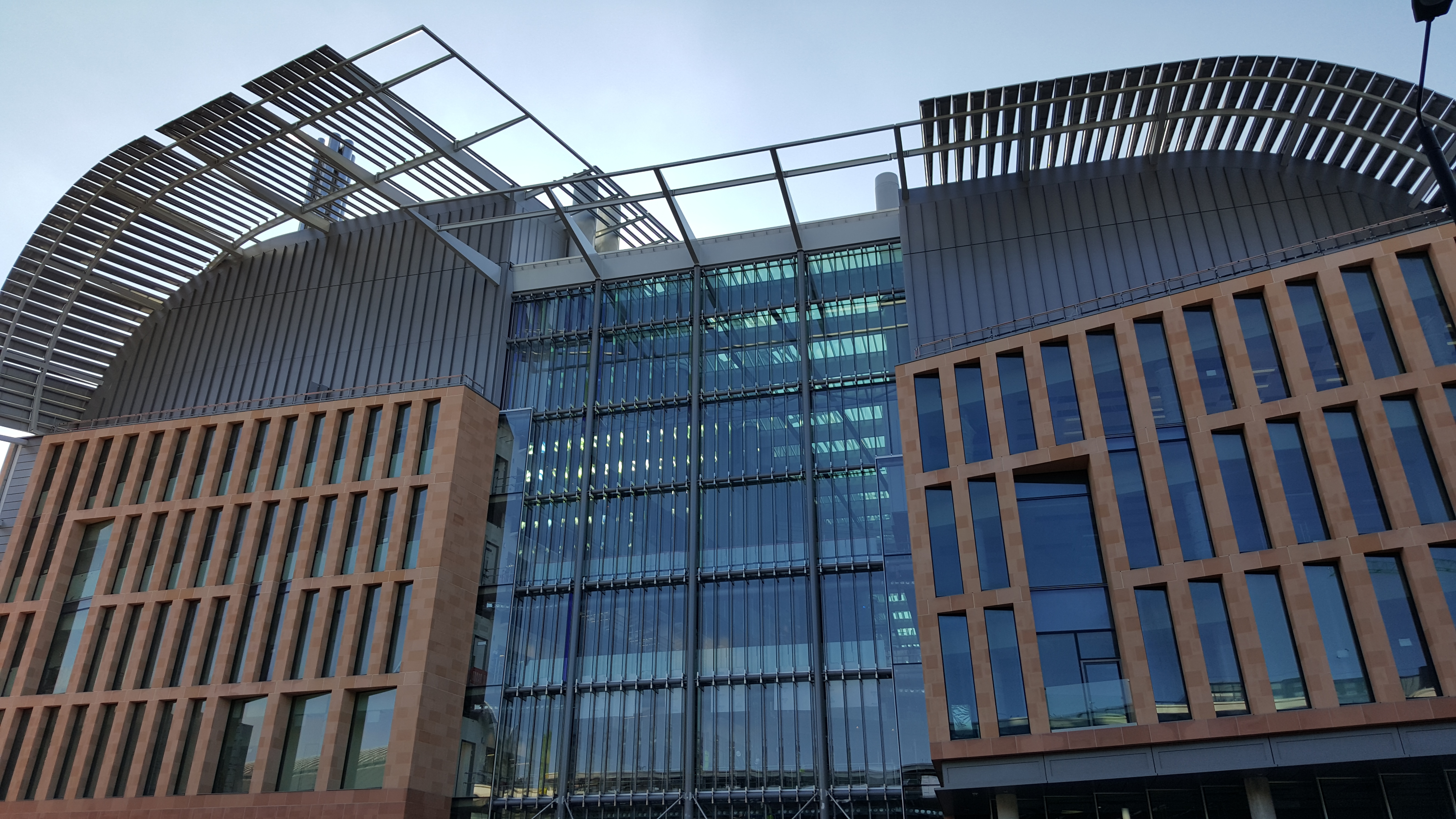
The Francis Crick Institute

The official weigh-in for the crews took place at the Francis Crick Institute on 14 March 2017, presented by BBC sports reporter Andrew Cotter.

=== Women ===
The Cambridge crew weighed an average of 74.0 kilograms (163 lb), 3.9 kilograms (8.6 lb) per rower more than their opponents. Oxford's president, German rower Isabell von Loga, withdrew from the race as a result of a shoulder injury, while Cambridge's president, Canadian rower Ashton Brown, made her third consecutive appearance in the race. Holly Hill and Myriam Goudet also had Boat Race experience for CUWBC, while no Blues returned for OUWBC.

Seat	Oxford					Cambridge				
Seat	Name	Nationality	College	Height	Weight	Name	Nationality	College	Height	Weight
Bow	Florence Pickles	British	Pembroke	169 cm (5 ft 6 1/2 in)	60.0 kg (132 lb)	Ashton Brown (P)	Canadian	Fitzwilliam	173 cm (5 ft 8 in)	82.0 kg (181 lb)
2	Alice Roberts	British	St Edmund Hall	169 cm (5 ft 6 1/2 in)	67.5 kg (149 lb)	Imogen Grant	British	Trinity	168 cm (5 ft 6 in)	58.2 kg (128 lb)
3	Rebecca te Water Naudé	British / South African	University	182 cm (5 ft 11 1/2 in)	67.2 kg (148 lb)	Claire Lambe	Irish	Homerton	178 cm (5 ft 10 in)	64.8 kg (143 lb)
4	Rebecca Esselstein	American	New College	170 cm (5 ft 7 in)	70.8 kg (156 lb)	Anna Dawson	New Zealander	Newnham	180 cm (5 ft 11 in)	78.6 kg (173 lb)
5	Harriet Austin	New Zealander	Christ Church	178 cm (5 ft 10 in)	76.5 kg (169 lb)	Holly Hill	British	Downing	183 cm (6 ft 0 in)	75.1 kg (166 lb)
6	Chloe Laverack	American	Green Templeton	177 cm (5 ft 9 1/2 in)	75.3 kg (166 lb)	Alice White	British / New Zealander	Homerton	176 cm (5 ft 9 1/2 in)	76.3 kg (168 lb)
7	Emily Cameron	Canadian	Mansfield	172 cm (5 ft 7 1/2 in)	76.0 kg (168 lb)	Myriam Goudet	French	Lucy Cavendish	183 cm (6 ft 0 in)	79.5 kg (175 lb)
Stroke	Jenna Herbert	American	Brasenose	165 cm (5 ft 5 in)	67.1 kg (148 lb)	Melissa Wilson	British	Lucy Cavendish	178 cm (5 ft 10 in)	77.1 kg (170 lb)
Cox	Eleanor Shearer	British	Balliol	155 cm (5 ft 1 in)	46.9 kg (103 lb)	Matthew Holland	British	Gonville and Caius	169 cm (5 ft 6 1/2 in)	52.3 kg (115 lb)
Sources: (P) – Boat club president Isabell von Loga was non-rowing president of OUWBC.

=== Men ===
The Cambridge crew weighed an average of 93.5 kilograms (206 lb), 3.3 kilograms (7.3 lb) per rower more than their opponents. Cambridge's number three, James Letten, was the heaviest man in the race, weighing 106.5 kilograms (235 lb). All but two (Dutchman Olivier Siegelaar and American Matthew O'Leary) of the Dark Blue crew were British; Siegelaar won a bronze medal at the 2016 Summer Olympics as part of the men's eight. Conversely, just two of the CUBC rowers were British. Oxford's bow man, William Warr, became the third individual to row in the Boat Race for both universities, having competed for the Light Blues in the 2015 event. Two members of the Cambridge crew had Boat Race experience, including Ben Ruble (who rowed in the 2015 and 2016 races) and president Lance Tredell (2016). Oxford featured three former Blues; Jamie Cook made his third appearance in the event, while Michael di Santo (who opted to compete at the 2016 Summer Olympics instead of in the Boat Race) and Josh Bugajski featured in their second race.

Seat	Oxford					Cambridge				
Seat	Name	Nationality	College	Height	Weight	Name	Nationality	College	Height	Weight
Bow	William Warr	British	Christ Church	195 cm (6 ft 5 in)	94.2 kg (208 lb)	Ben Ruble	American	Hughes Hall	188 cm (6 ft 2 in)	87.3 kg (192 lb)
2	Matthew O’Leary	American	Keble	180 cm (5 ft 11 in)	74.8 kg (165 lb)	Freddie Davidson	British	Emmanuel	189 cm (6 ft 2 1/2 in)	81.9 kg (181 lb)
3	Oliver Cook	British	Christ Church	194 cm (6 ft 4 1/2 in)	91.7 kg (202 lb)	James Letten	American	Hughes Hall	208 cm (6 ft 10 in)	106.5 kg (235 lb)
4	Josh Bugajski	British	Keble	194 cm (6 ft 4 1/2 in)	99.2 kg (219 lb)	Tim Tracey	American	Queens'	196 cm (6 ft 5 in)	97.4 kg (215 lb)
5	Olivier Siegelaar	Dutch	Keble	197 cm (6 ft 5 1/2 in)	101.2 kg (223 lb)	Aleksander Malowany	Canadian	Wolfson	194 cm (6 ft 4 1/2 in)	94.4 kg (208 lb)
6	Michael di Santo (P)	American	Trinity	185 cm (6 ft 1 in)	89.9 kg (198 lb)	Patrick Eble	American	Hughes Hall	193 cm (6 ft 4 in)	90.4 kg (199 lb)
7	Jamie Cook	British	St Cross	188 cm (6 ft 2 in)	84.0 kg (185 lb)	Lance Tredell (P)	British	Hughes Hall	194 cm (6 ft 4 1/2 in)	94.3 kg (208 lb)
Stroke	Vassilis Ragoussis	British	Linacre	194 cm (6 ft 4 1/2 in)	86.6 kg (191 lb)	Henry Meek	Australian / British	Hughes Hall	193 cm (6 ft 4 in)	95.4 kg (210 lb)
Cox	Sam Collier	British	New College	172 cm (5 ft 7 1/2 in)	59.8 kg (132 lb)	Hugo Ramambason	British	Trinity	175 cm (5 ft 9 in)	55.3 kg (122 lb)
Sources: (P) – Boat club president

== Pre-race ==
Gloriana reaching the end of the course at Chiswick Bridge

The day before the races were scheduled to take place, an unexploded Second World War bomb was discovered near Putney Bridge. Although this threatened to postpone the event, the device was successfully removed and did not disrupt the race programme.

The Queen's barge Gloriana led a procession of traditional craft along the course. These included the waterman's cutters used for the Oxbridge Waterman's Challenge – a race of these craft was held ahead of the main events.

== Races ==
The races were held on Sunday 2 April. Weather conditions were very favourable, with calm water and low windspeeds. Around a quarter of a million people lined the length of the course to watch the race.

=== Reserves ===
In the women's reserve race, Osiris won the toss and selected the Surrey side of the river, handing the Middlesex station to Blondie. The Cambridge crew made the better start and by the Mile Post were more than two lengths ahead. With a clear water advantage, Blondie made the most of the racing line and extended their lead throughout the race; they passed the finishing post about 13 lengths ahead of Osiris, in a time of 19 minutes, 6 seconds. It was Blondie's second consecutive victory, and took the overall tally (since 1968) to 23–20 in Cambridge's favour.

In the men's reserve race, Oxford's Isis won the toss and elected to start from the Surrey station. Goldie were late to the start and received a warning from the umpire Judith Packer. Rowing into a slight headwind, Goldie made the better start and held a slight lead by the Crabtree boathouse. Both crews were warned for encroachment as they passed Barn Elms, and at the Mile Post, Isis were a canvas-length down. By Thames Wharf, Isis had edged into the lead and by Hammersmith led by a length. Passing below the bridge, Oxford held a clear water advantage and moved across in front of Goldie, and were two lengths ahead by Chiswick Steps. Making a final push, Isis passed the finish line two and a half lengths ahead, in a time of 17 minutes, 17 seconds. It was Isis' seventh consecutive victory and took the overall tally in the event to 29–24 in Cambridge's favour.

=== Women's ===
The women's race started at 4:35 p.m. British Summer Time. Cambridge won the toss and elected to start from the Surrey station, handing the Middlesex side of the river to Oxford. The Oxford crew fell behind immediately when Rebecca Esselstein caught a crab at the start. Cambridge maintained their commanding lead throughout the race and won in a record time of 18 minutes and 33 seconds. The time beat the previous record by a minute, and the winning margin was around 11 lengths. It was Cambridge's first victory since 2012 and only their second win in ten years, and took the overall record in the event to 42–30 in their favour.

=== Men's ===
The men's race was scheduled to begin at 5:35 p.m. and got underway about five minutes late. Oxford won the toss and elected to start from the Surrey station. Oxford led from the start, and were one length ahead by Craven Cottage. The boats closed in on each other, prompting warnings from the umpire Matthew Pinsent, to avoid a clash of oars. OUBC pushed away on the approach to Hammersmith Bridge and held a clear water advantage soon after, moving across to row directly in front of Cambridge. Despite that, CUBC stayed in touch throughout the race, even recovering some of the deficit. Nevertheless, Oxford won in a time of 16 minutes 59 seconds with a margin of one and a quarter lengths. It was Oxford's fourth victory in five years, and took the overall record in the event to 82–80 in Cambridge's favour.
