= Harriet Austin (rower) =

New Zealand rower

Harriet Austin (born 14 May 1988) is a New Zealand rower from Whanganui.

She represented New Zealand in the women's eights in the 2010 World Rowing Championships at Lake Karapiro, and again in the 2010 World Rowing Cup at Rotsee, Lucerne, Switzerland.

She rowed in the number 6 seat, and was captain, for the Oxford women's crew in the 2017 Boat Race while studying for an MBA at Christ Church, University of Oxford.

Along with her sister Kate she rowed 200 miles (320 km) across the Mediterranean in 2017 in a biannual race called "NOMAN is an Island: Race to END HPV", part of the HPV and Anal Cancer Foundation.
