= Abingdon School Boat Club =

Rowing club in Oxfordshire, England

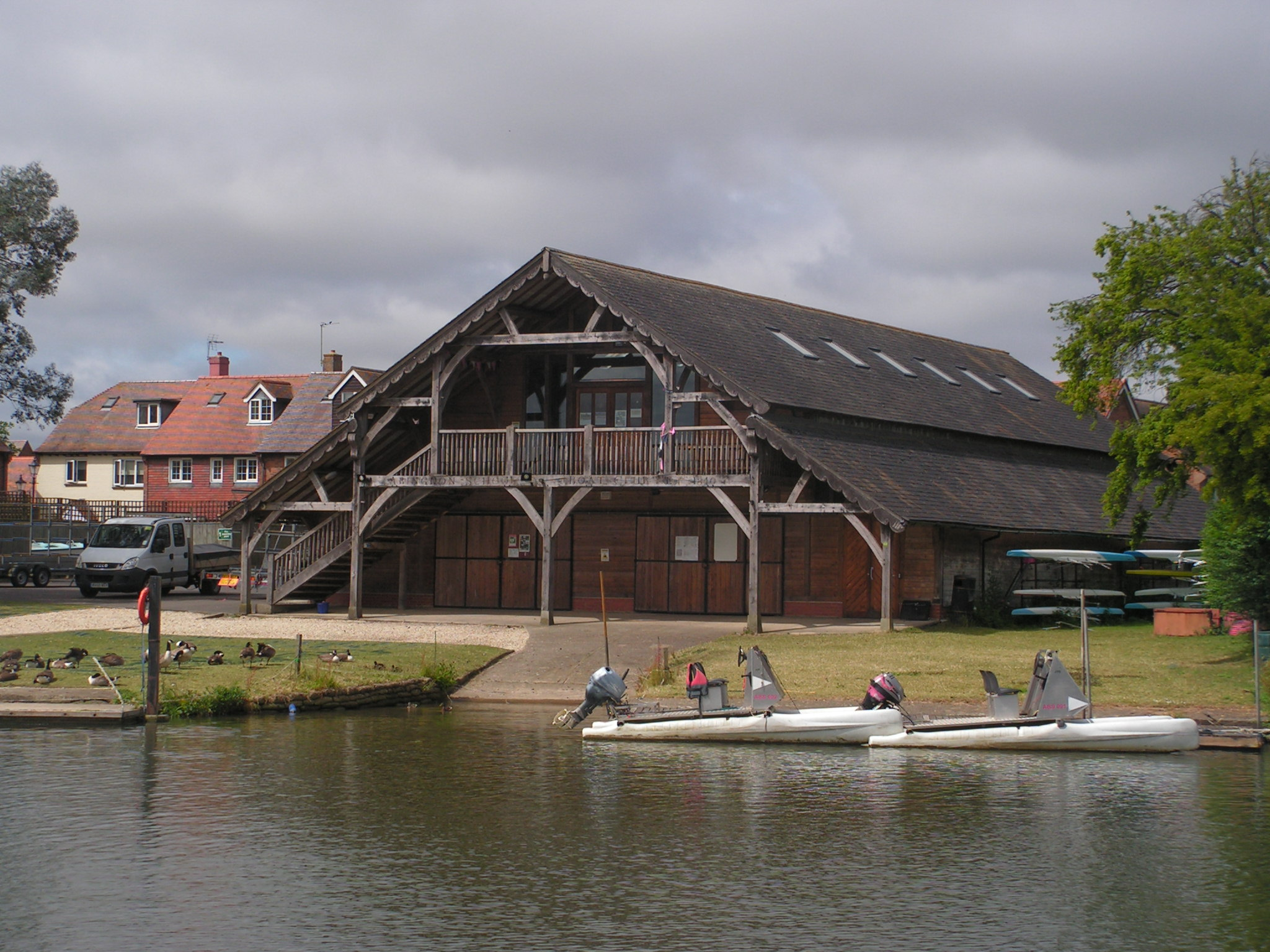

- Location: Abingdon, Oxfordshire, United Kingdom
- Home water: River Thames
- Founded: 1830
- Affiliations: British Rowing boat code - ABS
- Website: http://www.abingdon.org.uk/fasbc

Abingdon School Boat Club is the rowing club for Abingdon School. The club has a strong tradition of providing rowers for the Oxford University Boat Club, Cambridge University Boat Club and international teams.

== History ==
The boat club has a long history with the first documentary evidence of rowing as a school activity in 1830. Roysse's School Rowing Club (1840) became Abingdon School Boat Club.

Originally the club rowed in the Abingdon Town Regatta before creating the School Regatta in the 1890s following the discontinuation of the former. The principal event was the race between the first four and an Old Abingdonians (OAs) crew. Although the school had raced informally against Radley College the first official race with another school was on 5 July 1902 when the first four competed against St. Mark's School of Windsor. In 1936 the school entered the Marlow Regatta for the first time and won their first event at the Wallingford Regatta in 1952.

In 1953 a new boathouse was built before a maiden win at the Marlow Regatta in 1955 and a first appearance at the Henley Royal Regatta in 1960. In 1982 the club won 25 trophies followed by 31 in 1984 and in 1985 was listed as the most successful school rowing club in the country. In 1991 both the coxed fours and coxless fours became National Champions with the coxed four later representing England. Since 1991 Abingdon School has been represented at English or British junior international level every season.

The 1st VIII won the "triple" in 2002 and again in 2012: the Schools' Head of the River Race, the Queen Mother's Cup at the National Schools' Regatta and the Princess Elizabeth Challenge Cup at Henley Royal Regatta. 2006's J14's A and B squads both became National School Champions, whilst the 2007 J16's won the junior Inter-Regionals 8+ event, and a J16 4+ crew went to form half the winning GB 8+ in the GB-France match. In 2009 the 1st VIII reached the final of the Henley Royal Regatta before losing to a "triple" winning Eton College crew.

In 2011 the 1st VIII achieved victory again at the Schools Head of the River. They backed this up by winning the Princess Elizabeth Cup at Henley Royal Regatta, on the way setting a new record of 6:19 for the course in the semi-final against Radley College, beating the long-standing record set by Pangbourne College in 1992 of 6:22. The 1st VIII won the Princess Elizabeth Cup in 2012 and 2013 too, setting a new course record in the 2013 final of 6:17. The last time a school won the cup for three consecutive years was Bedford School in 1948.

From 2002 to 2013 the school won the Princess Elizabeth Challenge Cup four times. In 2016 and 2017 the school provided a total of six members for the University boat race, (four for Oxford and two for Cambridge).

== Notable rowers ==
- William Richard Portal, winner of the Wyfold Challenge Cup at the Henley Royal Regatta in 1857
- Percy Alexander Nowell Thorn, winner of the Wyfold Challenge Cup at the Henley in 1889
- Cecil Davidge (1901–1981)
- Dick Eason (1902–1978) University boat race
- Sir David Tanner CBE (born 1947), British Olympic Rowing coach
- Mark Andrews (born 1959), World championship medallist/Uni boat race
- Richard Emerton (born 1960), University boat race
- Jonathan 'Mark' Herd (born 1965), National champion/World Student Games
- Martin Haycock (born 1973), University boat race cox
- Alistair Ross (born 1973), World Junior Championships
- Phil Baker (born 1975), World championship medallist
- Alex Greaney (born 1975), University boat race cox
- David Smith (born 1975), World Junior Championships
- Charlie Pank (born 1978), World Junior medallist
- Edward Russell (born 1979), World Junior medallist
- Richard Pinckney (born 1979), Isis crew boat race
- Robin Bourne-Taylor (born 1981), Olympian
- Hugh Mackenzie (born 1981), World Junior medallist
- George Whittaker (born 1981), University boat race
- Tom Kingham (born 1984), World Junior Championships
- Jamie Anderson (born 1985), World Junior champion
- Nick Brodie (born 1986), OUBC President and University boat race cox, World Junior Champion, World Junior Silver Medalist, U23 World Championships
- Tom Williams (born 1986), World Junior medallist
- Brian Cullen (born 1986), World Junior Championships
- Ryan Bucke (born 1988), World Junior/U23 Championships
- Paddy Vickers (born 1988), World Junior Championships
- Matt Rossiter (born 1989), Junior/U23/European gold medallist & Olympian
- Oliver Cook (born 1990), World/European champion & Olympian
- Fearghus Raftery (born 1990), World Junior Championships
- Max Gander (born 1990), World Junior/U23 Championships
- Felix Wood (born 1991), World Junior Championships
- Rory Copus (born 1991), Junior/U23 Championships & double World University champion
- Jamie Cook (born 1992), U23 Championships & University boat race
- Timothy Richards (born 1992), World Rowing U23 Championships
- George Rossiter (born 1992), World University Champion & International rower
- Felix Newman (born 1993), World Junior Championships & University boat racer
- Jamie Copus (born 1993), World Junior/U23 Championships & International rower
- John Carter (born 1993), World Junior Championships
- Vassilis Ragoussis (born 1993), University boat race
- Ian Middleton (born 1995), University boat race cox
- Matthew Carter (born 1995), World Junior Championships
- Joel Cooper (born 1995), World Junior Championships
- Henry Lambe (born 1996), World Junior Championships
- Guy Screaton (born 1997), World Junior Championships
- Thomas Digby (born 1998), Olympic and World champion
- Adam Teece (born 1998), World Junior Championships
- Connor Brown (born 2001), World Junior Champs & U23 silver medal
- Edward Bayfield (born 2007), 2x Gold medal winner at World Junior Championships

== Junior internationals ==
Below is a list of Junior Internationals capped by either Great Britain at Coupe de la Jeunesse or at the Home International Regatta.

- Spencer Hickson (born 1973), (national champion)
- Chris Jones (born 1973), (national champion)
- Ben Ulyatt (born 1973), (national champion)
- Richard Claye (born 1973), (national champion)
- Peter Godsell (born 1975)
- Nick Edmonds (born 1975)
- Mike Litchfield (born 1976)
- Jonathan Watkinson (born 1976)
- Christian Schoof (born 1976)
- James Sporle (born 1976)
- James McCormick (born 1976)
- William Hoodless (born 1976)
- Anthony Hankin (born 1976)
- Guy Carling (born 1977)
- Ben Marshall (born 1977)
- David Hutchins (born 1977)
- David Lourie (born 1977)
- Jake Airey (born 1977)
- Simon Morris (born 1978)
- Mark Pajak (born 1978)
- Andrew McNeillie (born 1979)
- David Kingsley (born 1979)
- Anthony 'David' Livingstone (born 1979)
- Tom Frankum (born 1980)
- Nick Williams (born 1982)
- Jack Tarrell (born 1984)
- Nicholas Hopkins (born 1984)
- Ewan MacDonald (born 1984)
- Howard Feather (born 1984)
- Felix Hemsley (born 1984)
- Nick Herbert (born 1984)
- Tim Guiver (born 1984)
- Joseph Calnan (born 1985)
- Joe Prinold (born 1985), (national champion)
- Alex Paxton (born 1985), (national champion)
- Joshua Fyne (born 1986)
- George Clarkson (born 1986)
- Iain McKenzie (born 1986), (national champion)
- Christopher Kennedy (born 1986), (national champion)
- Nicholas Turnbull (born 1987)
- Tom Woods (born 1987)
- Michael White (born 1987)
- Alexander Freeland (born 1989)
- Simon Jeffreys (born 1990)
- Andrew Hatzis (born 1991)
- Tom Davey (born 1991)
- Jack Maynard (born 1991)
- Dan Boddington (born 1991)
- Timothy Clarke (born 1991)
- Rob Fife (born 1992)
- Charles Brampton (born 1992)
- Hugo Mendus (born 1992)
- Alexander Hatzis (born 1993)
- James Tracey (born 1993)
- Neil McKenzie (born 1993)
- William Davey (born 1993)
- Andrew Halls (born 1994)
- Kristian Wood (born 1994)
- Thomas Pagel (born 1994)
- James Richards (born 1994)
- Will Horlock (born 1994)
- Max Brittan (born 1995)
- Tom Browne (born 1995)
- Rory Brampton (born 1995)
- Luke Wiggins (born 1996)
- Jonathan Lord (born 1996)
- Jack Walsh (born 1996)
- Matthew Wiblin (born 2001)
- Calum Forrest (born 2006)
- Rob Sagar (born 2006) (Wales)
- William Beer (born 2008)
- James Waggett (born 2008)
- Tobias Chapman (born 2009)

== Coaches ==
The school has a history of top-level coaches who have been instrumental in the continued success of the Boat Club and its athletes, to the tune of multiple national and Henley Royal Regatta titles, including "the triple" in 2002 and 2012 – an achievement which comprises winning the Schools' Head of the River Race, Championship eights at the National Schools' Regatta and finally the Princess Elizabeth Challenge Cup at Henley Royal Regatta, all in the same year.

| Year | Director of Rowing | 1st VIII Coach | National Championships / Major honours |
|---|---|---|---|
| 1991 | Mike Martin | Mike Martin | 1991 British Rowing Championships (x2), J18 4-, J18 4+ |
| 1992 | Mike Martin | Mike Martin | 1992 British Rowing Championships (x2), J18 8+, J16 8+ |
| 1993 | Mike Martin | Mike Martin | |
| 1994 | Mike Martin | Mike Martin | |
| 1995 | Mike Martin | Mike Martin | |
| 1996 | Mike Martin | Mike Martin | 1996 British Rowing Championships J16 4+ |
| 1997 | Mike Martin | Mike Martin | |
| 1998 | Mike Martin | Mike Martin | |
| 1999 | Mike Martin | Mike Martin | |
| 2000 | Mike Martin | Mike Martin | 2000 British Rowing Championships (x3), J18 4+c, J16 4-, J16 4+ |
| 2001 | Mike Martin | Mike Martin | |
| 2002 | Mike Martin | Mike Martin | The Triple - Princess Elizabeth Challenge Cup J18 8+ / Queen Mother Challenge Cup J18 8+ / Schools' Head of the River Race J18 8+ |
| 2003 | Mike Martin | Mike Martin | |
| 2004 | Mike Martin | Mike Martin | Queen Mother Challenge Cup J18 8+ / 2004 British Rowing Championships (x2), J18 4+, J16 4- |
| 2005 | Mike Martin | Mike Martin | Queen Mother Challenge Cup J18 8+ |
| 2006 | Athol Hundermark | Mike Martin | |
| 2007 | Athol Hundermark | Mike Martin | |
| 2008 | Athol Hundermark | Mike Martin | |
| 2009 | Athol Hundermark | Athol Hundermark | |
| 2010 | Athol Hundermark | Athol Hundermark | |
| 2011 | Athol Hundermark | Athol Hundermark | Princess Elizabeth Challenge Cup J18 8+ / Schools' Head of the River Race J18 8+ / 2011 British Rowing Championships, J18 4-c |
| 2012 | Athol Hundermark | Athol Hundermark | The Triple - Princess Elizabeth Challenge Cup J18 8+ / Queen Mother Challenge Cup J18 8+ / Schools' Head of the River Race J18 8+ |
| 2013 | James Fox | Dave Currie | Princess Elizabeth Challenge Cup J18 8+ / Queen Mother Challenge Cup J18 8+ |
| 2014 | Mark Earnshaw | Dave Currie | Queen Mother Challenge Cup J18 8+ |
| 2015 | Mark Earnshaw | Mark Earnshaw | 2015 British Rowing Junior Championships, J16 2- |
| 2016 | Mark Earnshaw | Ali Brown | |
| 2017 | Mark Earnshaw | Ali Brown | |
| 2018 | Mark Earnshaw | Mark Earnshaw | |
| 2019 | Mark Earnshaw | Rory Copus | |
| 2020 | Mark Earnshaw | Rory Copus | |
| 2021 | Mark Earnshaw | Rory Copus | |
| 2022 | Mark Earnshaw | Rory Copus | |
| 2023 | Mark Earnshaw | Mike Webb | |
| 2024 | Mark Earnshaw | Phil Gray | Canterbury Cup J14 4x+ |
| 2025 | Mark Earnshaw | Phil Gray | |
| 2026 | Mark Earnshaw | Phil Gray | Great Britain v France Match J16 4+ |

Key

| Symbol | meaning |
|---|---|
| 1, 2, 4, 8 | crew size |
| + | coxed |
| - | coxless |
| x | sculls |
| c | part of a composite |
| 16, 18 | Under-16/18 |
| J | Junior |

== See also ==
- List of Old Abingdonians
