= John Garrett (rower) =

British international rower

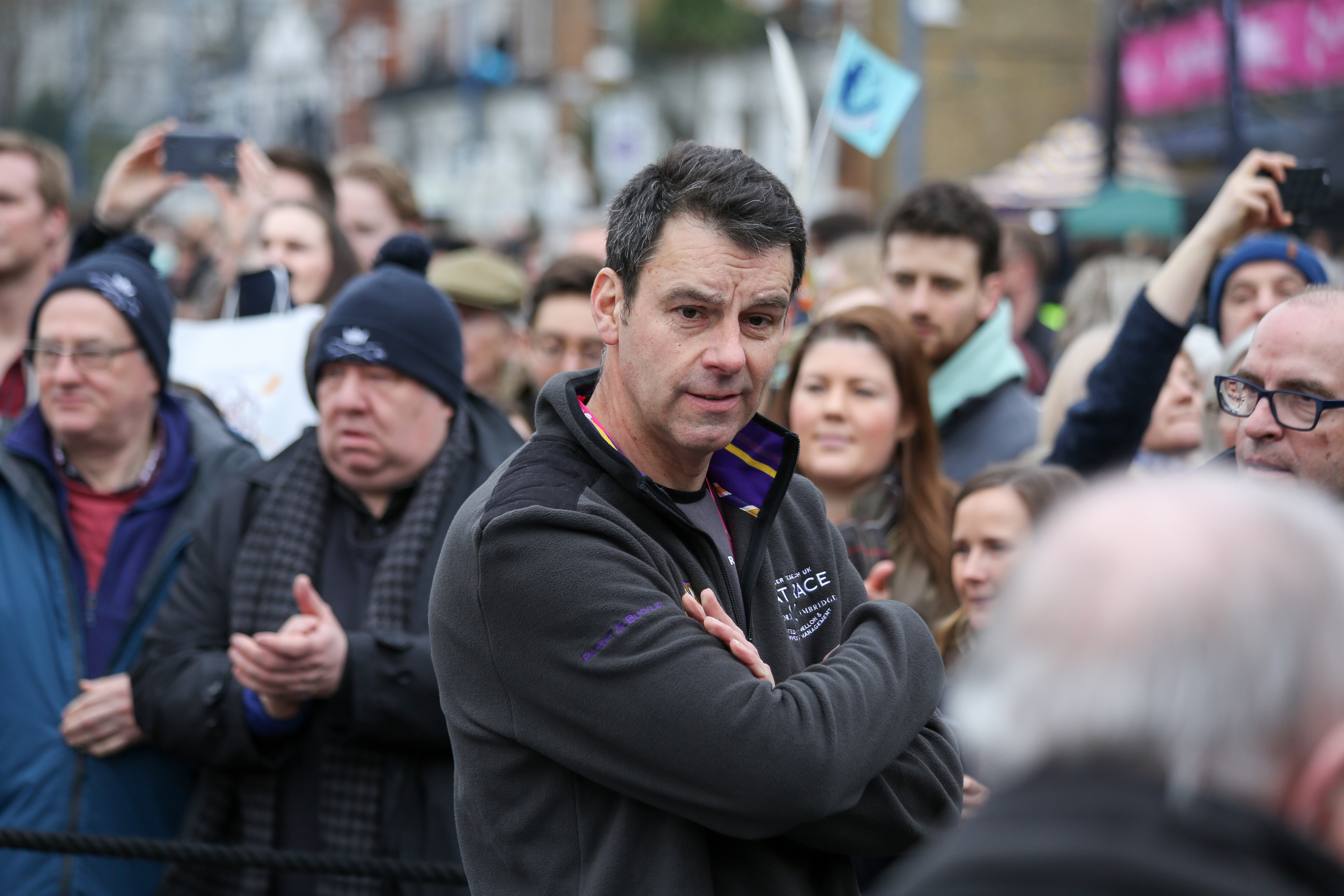
- Garrett as umpire at The Boat Race 2018

Personal information
- Born: 6 January 1963 (age 63) Radley, Oxfordshire, England

Sport
- Club: Leander Club, Henley-on-Thames; CUBC, Cambridge (GBR)
Medal record
Rowing
Representing England
Commonwealth Games
Silver medal – second place	1986 Edinburgh	eight

John Leslie Garrett (born 6 January 1963) is a British former international rower.

== Rowing career ==
Garrett represented Great Britain at the 1984, 1988 and 1992 Summer Olympics. He crewed for Cambridge in the 1984 and 1985 Boat Races. He has umpired The Boat Race on numerous occasions, including 2008, 2012, and the 2018 men's race. He represented England and won a silver medal in the eight, at the 1986 Commonwealth Games in Edinburgh, Scotland.

== Life ==
Garrett was born in Radley, Oxfordshire. He was educated at Shrewsbury, where he won Henley with the boat club twice, and at St John's College, Cambridge, where he crewed for the Lady Margaret Boat Club before advancing to the Cambridge boat.

== Politics ==
Garrett stood as the Labour Party candidate in Fylde at the 1997 General Election, where he came in second place with 31.65 per cent of the vote. He is not to be confused with John Laurence Garrett, who stood down as the Labour MP for Norwich South that same year.
