= Phil Baker (rower) =

British rower

Philip Baker
- Born: 1975

Philip George Jeffreys Baker (born 1975) is a former Great Britain international rower.

Baker was educated at Abingdon School where he was captain of the Abingdon School Boat Club eights before moving on to Oxford Brookes University Boat Club. He represented Great Britain at the 1999 World Rowing Championships winning a silver medal in the Lightweight Men's Eights. The following year Baker repeated the feat in the 2000 World Rowing Championships winning a silver medal again in the Lightweight Men's Eights. In addition to the world championship silver in 2000 he also won a silver medal at the 2000 World Rowing Cup in the Lightweight Men's Pair.

== See also ==
- List of Old Abingdonians
