= Martin Haycock =

British rower

Personal information
- Nationality: British (English)
- Born: 18 September 1973 (age 53)
- Education: Abingdon School

Sport
- Sport: Rowing
- College team: Magdalene College, Cambridge
- Club: Cambridge University Boat Club; Magdalene Boat Club
Medal record
Representing Great Britain
Summer Universiade
Silver medal – second place	1993 Buffalo	Eights

Martin Neill Haycock (born 18 September 1973) is a former British international coxswain.

== Profile ==
Whilst in education at Abingdon School he was captain of the eights and gained colours for the Abingdon School Boat Club. After leaving Abingdon in 1991 he attended Magdalene College, Cambridge.

== Rowing ==
In 1993 Haycock was selected as the cox for Cambridge at the world renowned Boat Race, finishing on the winning side. A second appearance ensued one year later in 1994, with Haycock once again coxing the winning team.

In addition to the two victories, he represented Great Britain at the 1993 World Student Games in Buffalo, New York, where he coxed the eights to a silver medal.

== See also ==
- List of Old Abingdonians
