= Alice White (rower) =

British-New Zealand rower

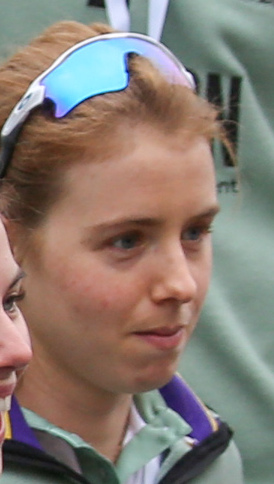
- Alice White during the 2018 Cancer Research UK Boat Race

Personal information
- Full name: Alice Jean White
- Nationality: British/New Zealand
- Citizenship: British
- Born: 20 January 1993 (age 33)
- Education: Homerton College, Cambridge; University of California, Los Angeles
- Years active: 2009–present
- Height: 176 cm (69 in)
- Weight: 76.3 kg (168 lb)

Sport
- Country: United Kingdom/New Zealand
- Sport: Rowing
- Position: Port
Medal record
Women's rowing
The Boat Race
Gold medal – first place	2017	team
Gold medal – first place	2018	team

Alice Jean White (born 20 January 1993) is a British-New Zealand rower. She has represented both New Zealand and Great Britain in junior and senior level rowing competitions. White has competed in and twice won the annual UK Boat Race in 2017 and 2018, representing Cambridge, and helping to set the course record in the 2017 race. She has twice competed in the NCAA Championships in the United States. Originally from Yorkshire, England, she emigrated to first to New Zealand as a child, where she attended high school, before attending the University of California, Los Angeles to study psychobiology, and then Cambridge studying Clinical Neuroscience with a focus on Huntington's disease.

== Early life ==
Alice White was born to Edward White and Louise Wild on 20 January 1993. She has one brother, Sam. Originally from Bradford, she lived in Yorkshire, until the age of 10 when her parents emigrated to New Zealand, where she attended Hillcrest High School in Hamilton. White became interested in rowing following the Beijing Olympics in 2008, watching Georgina and Caroline Evers-Swindell. According to White, she attended a "two-week learn to row programme and really didn't like it". She was later reintroduced to the sport the following year, when friends asked her to fill the final remaining seat on their boat.

Competing with the Hamilton Rowing Club and the Waikato Regional Performance Center, she was named as the most promising athlete in 2009, and in 2010 was named the Hamilton Club's "rower of the year'.

== Career ==
White started rowing in 2009 when she was living in New Zealand. She represented New Zealand at the 2011 World Junior Rowing Championships, where she won the bronze medal.

White attended the University of California, Los Angeles studying for a degree in psychobiology. While there, she competed in the NCAA Championships, where her team finished first in the V8+ Petite Final in 2013, and saw two third-place finishes in the V8+ in 2014, going on to finish first in the C Final. She was named by the Collegiate Rowing Coaches Association, as a National Scholar-Athlete in 2015 and again in 2016.

She represented Great Britain in the 2015 World Rowing U23 Championships in Plovdiv, Bulgaria, where her team finished third, behind Russia and the United States. She, along with Georgie Haycraft advanced to the final round of the Rosie Mayglothling Trophy in 2015 in the double sculls, but lost to the Molesey Boat Club. The same year, she won the gold medal at the Great Britain Under 23 event.

She then moved to the University of Cambridge, to study for her Master of Philosophy at the Homerton College. There, she studies in the Department of Clinical Neuroscience with a focus on researching Huntington's disease. White represented Cambridge University in the 2018 The Boat Race, also known as the Women's Cancer Research UK Boat Race, where her team broke the course record by more than a minute, at an overall time of 18 minutes and 33 seconds. She was one of two rowers from the 2017 team to return to the race in 2018, along with Miriam Goudet-Boukhatmi, where they again won with at time of 19 minutes and 15 seconds.

== Charitable work ==
White volunteers at Eddie's, an English charity directed at helping youth and adults with learning disabilities, and works specifically with those who have autism.
