= The Boat Race 1985 =

131st Boat Race
- Date: 6 April 1985
- Winner: Oxford
- Margin of victory: 4 3/4 lengths
- Winning time: 17 minutes 11 seconds
- Overall record (Cambridge–Oxford): 68–62
- Umpire: Ronnie Howard (Oxford)

Other races
- Reserve winner: Isis
- Women's winner: Oxford

The 131st Boat Race took place on 6 April 1985. Held annually, the event is a side-by-side rowing race between crews from the Universities of Oxford and Cambridge along the River Thames. Oxford won by 4 3/4 lengths. Bruce Philp became the first man to row for both universities having previously rowed for Cambridge, and Henrietta Shaw became the first female cox for Cambridge.

Isis won the reserve race, while Oxford were victorious in the Women's Boat Race.

== Background ==
The Boat Race is a side-by-side rowing competition between the University of Oxford (sometimes referred to as the "Dark Blues") and the University of Cambridge (sometimes referred to as the "Light Blues"). First held in 1829, the race takes place on the 4.2-mile (6.8 km) Championship Course on the River Thames in southwest London. The rivalry is a major point of honour between the two universities and followed throughout the United Kingdom and broadcast worldwide. Oxford went into the race as reigning champions, having beaten Cambridge by 3 1/4 lengths in the previous year's race. However Cambridge held the overall lead, with 68 victories to Oxford's 61 (excluding the "dead heat" of 1877). The race was sponsored by Ladbrokes for the ninth consecutive year.

The first Women's Boat Race took place in 1927, but did not become an annual fixture until the 1960s. Until 2014, the contest was conducted as part of the Henley Boat Races, but as of the 2015 race, it is held on the River Thames, on the same day as the men's main and reserve races. The reserve race, contested between Oxford's Isis boat and Cambridge's Goldie boat has been held since 1965. It usually takes place on the Tideway, prior to the main Boat Race.

== Crews ==
Oxford were pre-race favourites, and weighed an average of 4 pounds (1.8 kg) per rower more than their opponents. Oxford's crew contained four former Blues while Cambridge featured three. Bruce Philp became the first man to row for both universities, having represented Cambridge in the 1982 and 1983 races. Henrietta Shaw became the first woman to cox the Cambridge boat.

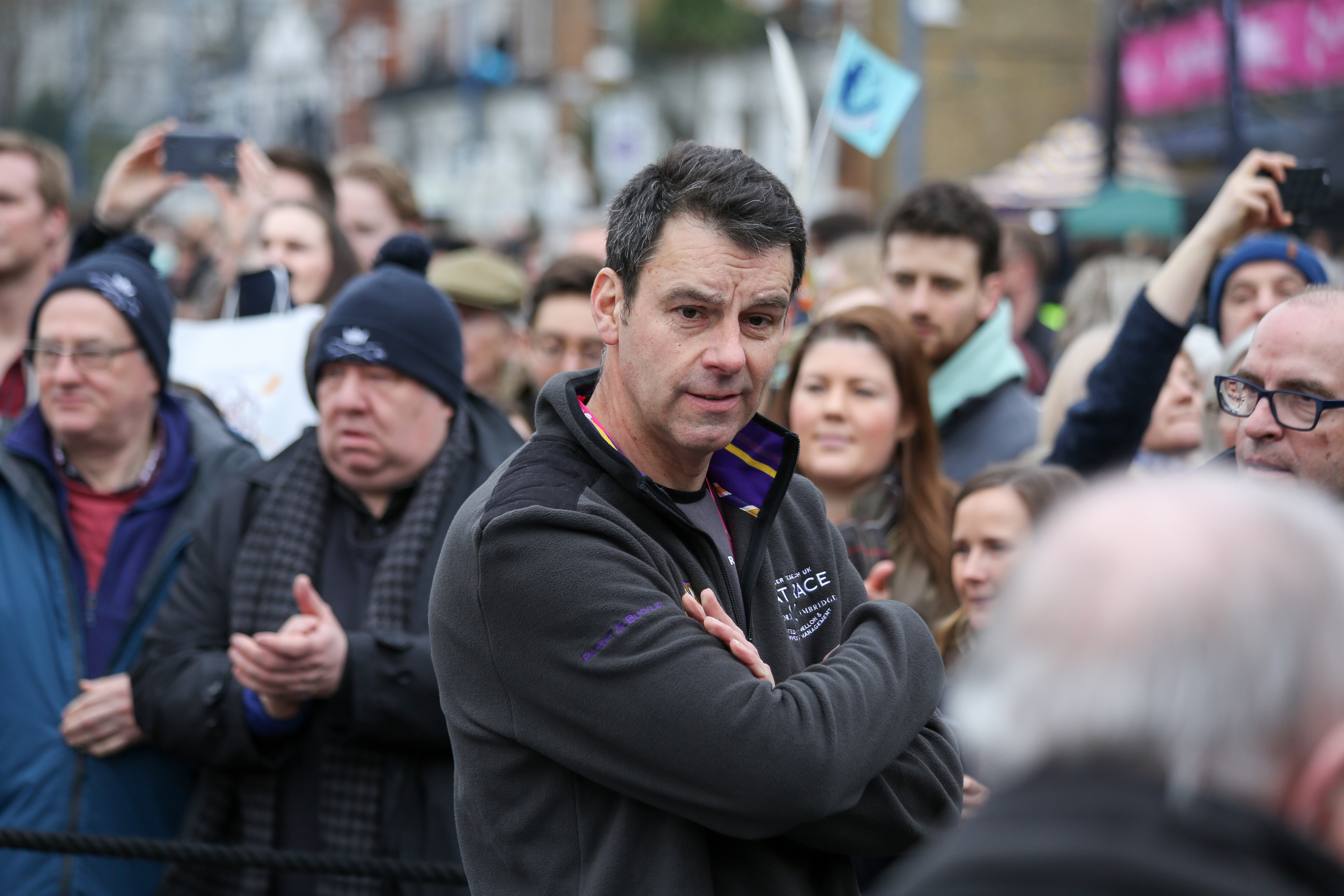
John Garrett (pictured in 2018) rowed at number 7 for Cambridge.

Seat	Oxford			Cambridge		
Seat	Name	College	Weight	Name	College	Weight
Bow	G J Cartledge	New College	13 st 6 lb	J S Witter	St Catharine's	12 st 11 lb
2	C L Richmond	Christ Church	12 st 1 lb	A L Pasternak	Magdalene	13 st 0 lb
3	B M Philp	Worcester	15 st 0 lb	J D Hughes	Downing	13 st 10 lb
4	A M S Thomas	Pembroke	13 st 1 lb	P M Broughton	Magdalene	14 st 7 lb
5	P M Hare	Balliol	15 st 3 lb	S M Peel	Downing	14 st 5 lb
6	G R D Jones	New College	14 st 1 lb	G A Barnard	Robinson	13 st 2 lb
7	W J Lang	Magdalen	14 st 3 lb	J L Garrett	Lady Margaret Boat Club	14 st 8 lb
Stroke	F M Reininger	Magdalen	14 st 6 lb	J M Pritchard	Robinson	13 st 2 lb
Cox	S R Lesser	Magdalen	8 st 4 lb	H L Shaw	Lady Margaret Boat Club	6 st 2 lb

== Race ==
The Championship Course along which the Boat Race is run

Cambridge won the toss and elected to start from the Surrey station. A quick start from Cambridge coupled with a poor one from Oxford saw the Light Blues take a third of a length lead before being reined back at Fulham Football Club. A one-second lead at the mile post preceded a period of warnings from umpire Ronnie Howard to both coxes as they contested the same water. Oxford held a canvas' lead as the crews passed under Hammersmith Bridge and began to move away along Chiswick Eyot. A ten-second lead at Barnes Bridge became a thirteen-second lead at the finishing post, as Oxford took the win by four and three-quarter lengths in a time of 17 minutes 11 seconds. This was Oxford's tenth consecutive victory, and their eleventh in twelve years, and took the overall record to 68–62 in favour of Cambridge.

In the reserve race, Oxford's Isis beat Cambridge's Goldie by three lengths, while Oxford won the 40th Women's Boat Race.

== Reaction ==
Cambridge stroke John Pritchard said "I tried everything. But at the vital moment, the boat went heavy." His Oxford counterpart Francis Reininger said "I was always optimistic that the power was there waiting to be switched on. When I asked for it, it glowed." Oxford coach Dan Topolski suggested that being given the Middlesex station was to their advantage, "I was glad to have Middlesex because in training our first three minutes had always been relatively poor."
