= The Boat Race 1994 =

140th Boat Race
- Date: 26 March 1994
- Winner: Cambridge
- Margin of victory: 6 1/2 lengths
- Winning time: 18 minutes 9 seconds
- Overall record (Cambridge–Oxford): 71–68
- Umpire: John Garrett (Cambridge)

Other races
- Reserve winner: Goldie
- Women's winner: Cambridge

The 140th Boat Race took place on 26 March 1994. Held annually, the Boat Race is a side-by-side rowing race between crews from the Universities of Oxford and Cambridge along the River Thames. Cambridge won by 6 1/2 lengths. The race saw the first competitors from Norway in the history of the race, in brothers Snorre and Sverke Lorgen. It was also the first time that both competing coxes had previously won the event.

In the reserve race, Cambridge's Goldie defeated Oxford's Isis, while Cambridge won the Women's Boat Race.

== Background ==
The Boat Race is a side-by-side rowing competition between the University of Oxford (sometimes referred to as the "Dark Blues") and the University of Cambridge (sometimes referred to as the "Light Blues"). First held in 1829, the race takes place on the 4.2-mile (6.8 km) Championship Course on the River Thames in southwest London. The rivalry is a major point of honour between the two universities and followed throughout the United Kingdom and broadcast worldwide. Cambridge went into the race as reigning champions, having won the 1993 race by 3 1/2 lengths, with Cambridge leading overall with 70 victories to Oxford's 68 (excluding the "dead heat" of 1877). The race was sponsored by Beefeater Gin for the eighth consecutive year.

The first Women's Boat Race took place in 1927, but did not become an annual fixture until the 1960s. Up until 2014, the contest was conducted as part of the Henley Boat Races, but as of the 2015 race, it is held on the River Thames, on the same day as the men's main and reserve races. The reserve race, contested between Oxford's Isis boat and Cambridge's Goldie boat has been held since 1965. It usually takes place on the Tideway, prior to the main Boat Race.

In preparing for the race, Cambridge had defeated crews from both Leander and Molesey. Meanwhile, Oxford lost out to London Rowing Club's lightweight crew, but narrowly defeated the University of London Boat Club. They went on to secure victory in the Reading Head of the River race before head coach Richard Tinkler and his assistant Tim Bramfitt were removed from their positions. Fred Smallbone was installed as finishing coach for the Dark Blues whose build-up concluded with a loss to Leander. Cambridge were coached throughout by Harry Mahon, John Wilson and Sean Bowden.

== Crews ==
The crews weighed-in at The Hurlingham Club five days prior to the race. Oxford weighed an average of 14 st 7 lb (91.6 kg) per rower, 2 pounds (0.91 kg) more than their opponents. Oxford's crew featured two Norwegian brothers in Snorre and Sverke Lorgen, the first rowers from their country to participate in the Boat Race, both of whom had participated in both world championship and Olympic races. Oxford Boat Club president Kingsley Poole referred to them as "Herdy and Gerdy". He noted: "They've got some kind of kin thing where they can just switch on and go nuts". Cambridge welcomed back five former Blues while Oxford saw three return in the form of Michels, Poole and Chick.

Seat	Oxford			Cambridge		
Seat	Name	College	Weight	Name	College	Weight
Bow	Harry J MacMillan	Worcester	14 st 5.5 lb	Roger D Taylor	Trinity Hall	14 st 0.5 lb
2	Chris N Mahne	St Catherine's	14 st 10.5 lb	Will T M Mason	Trinity Hall	13 st 6 lb
3	Joe G Michels	St John's	13 st 4.5 lb	Sinclair M Gore	Jesus	13 st 10.5 lb
4	Andrew S Gordon-Brown	Keble	14 st 12.5 lb	Richard C Phelps	St Edmund's	14 st 3.5 lb
5	D Robert H Clegg ‡	Keble	13 st 12 lb	Jon A Bernstein (P)	St Edmund's	15 st 0 lb
6	Sverke Lorgen	University	16 st 1 lb	Matthew H W Parish	St Edmund's	14 st 6 lb
7	Snorre Lorgen	Nuffield	15 st 8.5 lb	Peter J M Hoeltzenbein	Magdalene	14 st 2.5 lb
Stroke	Kingsley K Poole (P)	St John's	13 st 2.5 lb	T Streppelhoff	St Edmund's	14 st 1 lb
Cox	H Elizabeth Chick	Christ Church	7 st 10 lb	M N Haycock	Magdalene	7 st 12.5 lb
Source: (P) – boat club president ‡ – Rob Clegg was brought in to replace Adam Pearson two weeks prior to the race.

== Race ==
The Championship Course along which the Boat Race is contested

Cambridge were considered to be pre-race favourites. Oxford won the toss and elected to start from the Middlesex station. After a poor start, which Oxford's cox Chick referred to as "a bit ropey", Cambridge took an early lead and were five seconds ahead at the Mile Post. They extended their advantage to eight seconds by Hammersmith Bridge and sixteen by Chiswick Steps. Poor steering from Haycock combined with determination from Oxford to stay in touch kept the Cambridge from moving too much further ahead; the Light Blues passed the finishing post in 18 minutes and 9 seconds, 6 1/2 lengths and 20 seconds ahead of the Dark Blues. It was Cambridge's first back-to-back victory since 1973. The race was umpired by former Cambridge Blue John Garrett.

In the reserve race, Cambridge's Goldie won by thirteen lengths over Isis, their seventh victory in eight years. Cambridge won the 49th Women's Boat Race a week earlier, a 2,000 metres (2,200 yd) race at Henley-on-Thames, by one length in a time of 6 minutes and 11 seconds, their fifth victory in six years.

== Reaction ==
Cambridge's boat club president Jon Bernstein said "it does not get any better than that." The Cambridge number four, Richard Phelps, was more descriptive: "It was a bitch of a race. We never cruised."
