= The Boat Races 2016 =

2016 boat races in London, England

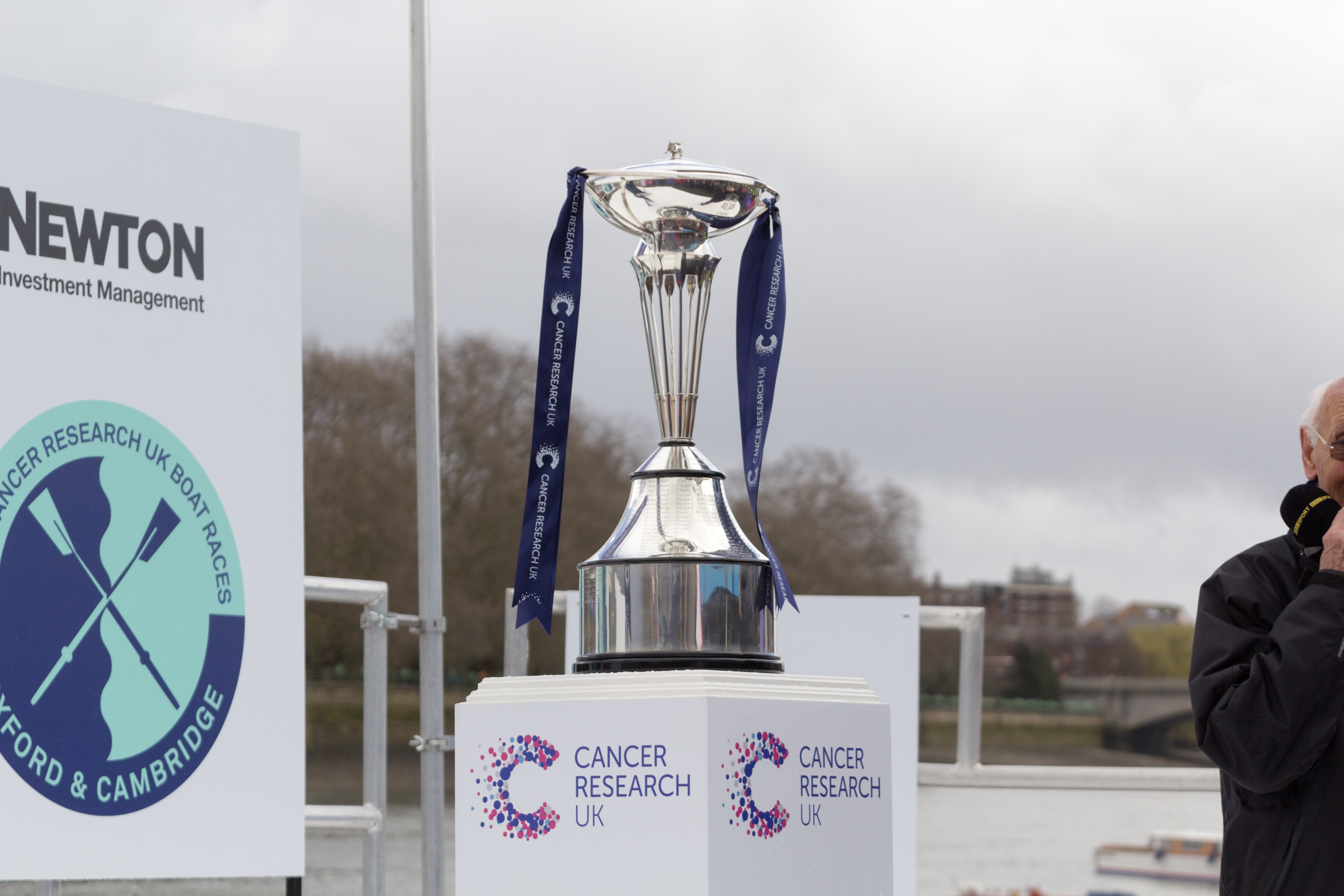
- Men's race winner's trophy
- Date: 27 March 2016

Men's race
- Winner: Cambridge
- Margin of victory: 2 1/2 lengths
- Winning time: 18 minutes 38 seconds
- Overall record (Cambridge–Oxford): 82–79
- Umpire: Simon Harris

Women's race
- Winner: Oxford
- Margin of victory: 24 lengths
- Winning time: 21 minutes 49 seconds
- Overall record (Cambridge–Oxford): 41–30
- Umpire: Rob Clegg

Reserves' races
- Men's winners: Isis
- Women's winners: Blondie

The 2016 Boat Races (also known as The Cancer Research UK Boat Races for sponsorship purposes) took place on 27 March 2016. Held annually, The Boat Race is a side-by-side rowing race between crews from the universities of Oxford and Cambridge along a 4.2-mile (6.8 km) tidal stretch of the River Thames in south-west London. For the first time in the history of the event, the men's, women's and both reserves' races were all held on the Tideway on the same day.

Trials for the race took place on the Championship Course in December 2015, and the selected crews took part in several practice races in the build-up to the main event. The weigh-in for the men's and women's races took place on 1 March 2016 with both Cambridge's men and women the heavier crews. Pre-race betting on the men's and women's event had Cambridge's men and Oxford's women as favourites to win.

In the men's reserve race, Cambridge's Goldie were beaten by Oxford's Isis by two lengths, their sixth consecutive defeat. In the women's reserve race, Cambridge's Blondie defeated Oxford's Osiris by three lengths, their first victory since the 2011 race. In the women's race, Oxford won easily as Cambridge nearly sank in rough conditions. It was Oxford's fourth consecutive win, and their eighth in nine races. The men's race was won by Cambridge by two and a half lengths, their first victory since the 2012 race, taking the overall record in the event to 82–79 in their favour.

== Background ==
The Championship Course along which, for the first time in the history of the event, the men's, women's and both reserves' races were conducted on the same day

The Boat Race is a side-by-side rowing competition between the University of Oxford (sometimes referred to as the "Dark Blues") and the University of Cambridge (sometimes referred to as the "Light Blues"). First held in 1829, the race takes place on the 4.2-mile (6.8 km) Championship Course, between Putney and Mortlake on the River Thames in south-west London. The rivalry is a major point of honour between the two universities; it is followed throughout the United Kingdom and broadcast worldwide. Oxford went into the 2016 race as defending champions, having won the 2015 race by a margin of six lengths, but Cambridge led overall with 81 victories to Oxford's 79 (excluding the 1877 race, officially a dead heat though claimed as a victory by the Oxford crew).

It was the first time in the history of The Boat Race that all four senior races – the men's, women's, men's reserves' and women's reserves' – were held on the same day and on the same course along the Tideway. Prior to 2015, the women's race, which first took place in 1927, was usually held at the Henley Boat Races along the 2,000-metre (2,200 yd) course; on at least two occasions in the interwar period, the women competed on the Thames between Chiswick and Kew. For the fourth year, the men's race was sponsored by BNY Mellon while the women's race was sponsored by BNY Mellon's subsidiary, Newton Investment Management. In January 2016, it was announced that the sponsors would donate the title sponsorship to Cancer Research UK and that the event was to be retitled "The Cancer Research UK Boat Races". There is no monetary award for winning the race, as the journalist Roger Alton notes: "It's the last great amateur event: seven months of pain for no prize money".

On Sunday 27 March, the women's race started at 3:10 p.m. British Summer Time, the women's reserve race (between Oxford's Osiris and Cambridge's Blondie) at 3:25 p.m., the men's reserves' race (between Oxford's Isis and Cambridge's Goldie) fifteen minutes later and the men's race a further half-hour after that at 4:10 pm. The men's race was umpired for the fifth time by Simon Harris, who had overseen the inaugural Tideway running of the Women's Boat Race in 2015. He rowed for Cambridge in the 1982 and 1983 races and was most recently umpire for the men's race in 2010. Rob Clegg, umpire for the 2011 race and three-time Oxford Blue, took charge of the women's race. The men's and women's reserves' races were umpired by Sarah Winckless and Judith Packer respectively, Winckless becoming the first-ever female official of a men's race.

Although around 250,000 spectators were expected to line the banks of the river, engineering works and poor weather reduced the attendance. The event was broadcast live in the United Kingdom on the BBC. Numerous broadcasters worldwide also showed the main races, including SuperSport across Africa, the EBU across Europe, SKY México across Central America, TSN in Canada and Fox Sports in Australia. It was also streamed live on BBC Online.

== Coaches ==
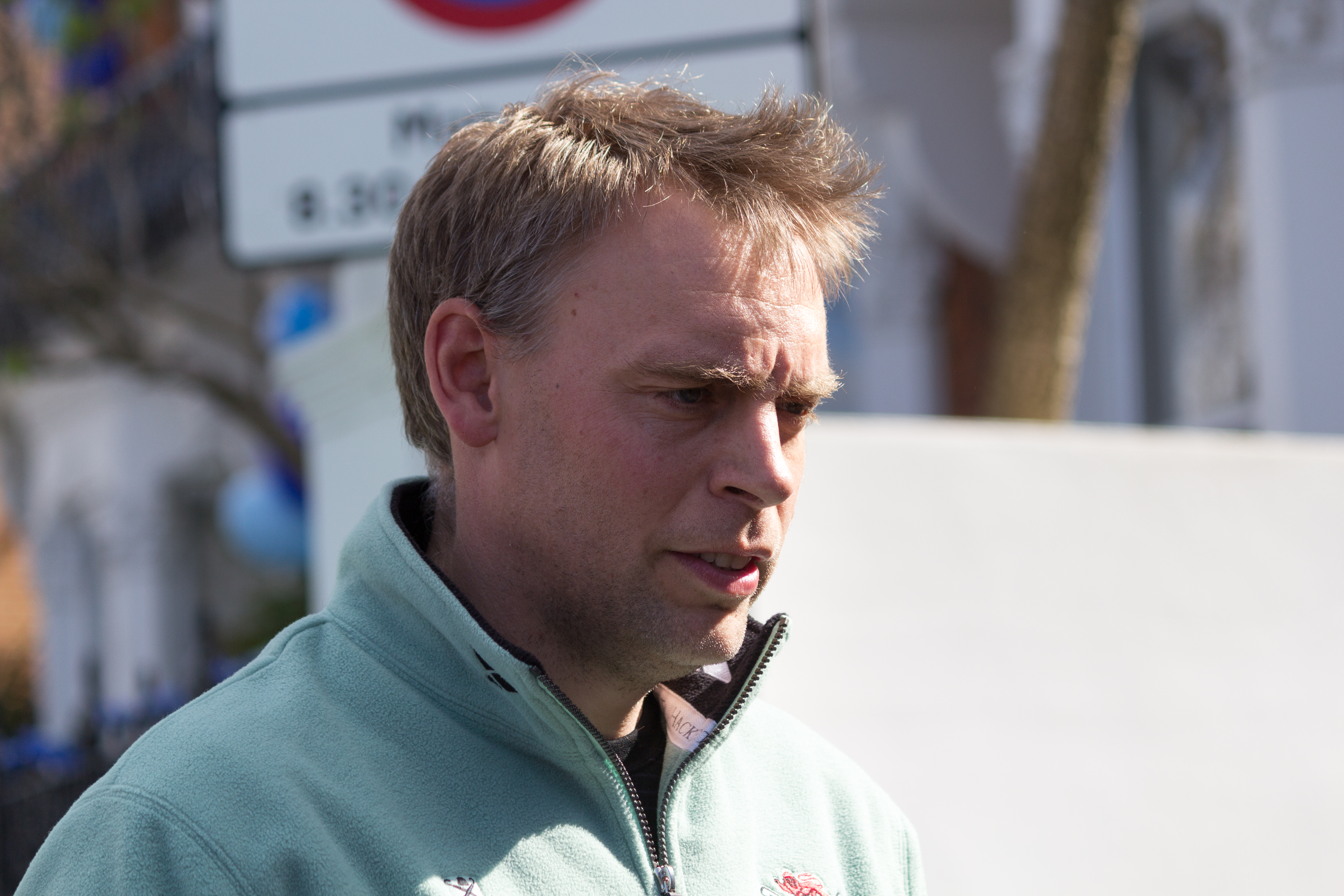
Cambridge men's coach Steve Trapmore

The Cambridge men's crew coaching team was led by their Chief Coach Steve Trapmore. Trapmore, a gold medal-winning member of the men's eight at the 2000 Summer Olympics, was appointed to the post in 2010. He was assisted by Ed Green, the former head coach at University College Cork and development coach at Molesey Boat Club. Donald Legget, who rowed for the Light Blues in the 1963 and 1964 races acted as a supporting coach, along with coxing coach Henry Fieldman (who steered Cambridge in the 2013 race) and the medical officer Simon Owens. Sean Bowden was Chief Coach for Oxford, having been responsible for the senior men's crew since 1997, winning 11 from 16 races. He was a former Great Britain Olympic coach and coached the Light Blues in the 1993 and 1994 Boat Races. His assistant coach was Andy Nelder who has coached the senior boat since 2006.

OUWBC's head coach was Christine Wilson who had been appointed in 2012. She was advised by former Dark Blue Neil Chugani, winning cox in the 1991 race. Cambridge's women were coached by former Goldie coach Rob Baker who was assisted by Paddy Ryan and Nick Acock, along with guest coach Jonathan Conder.

== Trials ==
Dates for the trials, where crews are able to simulate the race proper on the Championship Course, were announced in November 2015.

=== Women's ===
The women's trials took place on The Championship Course on 10 December 2015. The race between the Oxford boats, Scylla and Charybdis, was umpired by Rob Clegg and was described as "phenomenal". After an even start, Scylla held a one-length lead by Craven Cottage, extending it to two lengths by Hammersmith Bridge. A strong head wind caused rough water, and conditions worsened past Chiswick Eyot. Charybdis, stroked by OUWBC president Maddy Badcott, began to close the gap and took the lead around the second of the Surrey bends, to win the encounter by three lengths.

CUWBC's trial, Twickenham racing against Tideway, took place in rough water and windy conditions. The race was also umpired by Rob Clegg with both boats getting away together. Twickenham took an early lead, and following a steering error in which Tideway struck a buoy before Hammersmith Bridge, Twickenham were 2 1/2 lengths ahead by Chiswick Eyot and pulled away to win by four lengths.

=== Men's ===
The men's trials were conducted three days after the women's, on 13 December, also along The Championship Course. The Dark Blues, rowing in Business and Pleasure, were umpired by Simon Harris. Pleasure drew away to hold half a length's lead by the top of Putney Embankment, extending it to three-quarters of a length as the crews passed Harrods Furniture Depository. Although Business made a push to close the gap, Pleasure held their lead below Barnes Bridge but began to tire. Business started to reduce the deficit but too late, as Pleasure passed the finishing post half-a-length ahead.

Cambridge's trial boats were named Fuerte and Listo (strong and clever in Spanish) with the club's president Henry Hoffstot occupying the latter's number seven seat. Fuerte made the better start but by Barn Elms, the crews were level. With the umpire having to warn both crews for encroaching into each other's water at Fulham, Fuerte's Luke Juckett caught a crab, allowing Listo to take a small lead. Fuerte regained the advantage under Hammersmith Bridge and were a length ahead by Chiswick Eyot. Taking advantage of the clear water, Fuerte moved across in front of Listo, and rowed on to win by four lengths.

== Build-up ==
Cambridge were considered the favourites by bookmakers to win for the first time since the 2012 race. Bookmakers considered Oxford's women to be favourites to retain their title for the fifth consecutive year.

=== Women's ===
CUWBC competed against Oxford Brookes University Boat Club along the Tideway on 31 January in a two-segment race. In inclement weather, Cambridge started from the Surrey side of the river for the first segment, and were quickly behind. By Craven Cottage, Oxford Brookes were one-third of a length ahead, but CUWBC drew level by Harrods, and led under Hammersmith Bridge by a length to take victory. Oxford Brookes took Surrey for the second piece, starting at Chiswick Eyot. A close start saw the umpire John Garrett warning the crews for encroaching into each other's water, ultimately culminating in a clash under Barnes Bridge as Cambridge were pulling away. A "boat-stopping crab" put paid to any chance of Oxford Brookes recovering the deficit, and CUWBC won the second segment by three lengths.

CUWBC took on Molesey Boat Club on 22 February in a race from the Chiswick Steps to the Start post. A good start from the Light Blues saw them almost a length ahead by Chiswick Eyot, and move into a clear water advantage by St Paul's School. A further length's advantage was taken by Hammersmith Bridge which was soon extended to two by Harrods and three by the Mile Post. Despite encountering a strong headwind, CUWBC continued to pull away from Molesey and passed the Start line six lengths clear. Six days later, OUWBC competed against Molesey in a three-piece set on the Championship Course. Aggressive steering from the Dark Blues earned them several warnings from the umpire during the first race, and although it was initially close, OUWBC pulled away to hold a length's lead by the Mile Post before passing under Hammersmith Bridge two lengths ahead. The second segment from the Mile Post to Chiswick Eyot featured further clashes between the crews, but Oxford dominated, leading by three lengths at St Paul's boathouses and winning by four lengths. In the third race, Molesey took an early lead but OUWBC recovered before the crews shot Barnes Bridge, finishing the piece two lengths ahead.

=== Men's ===
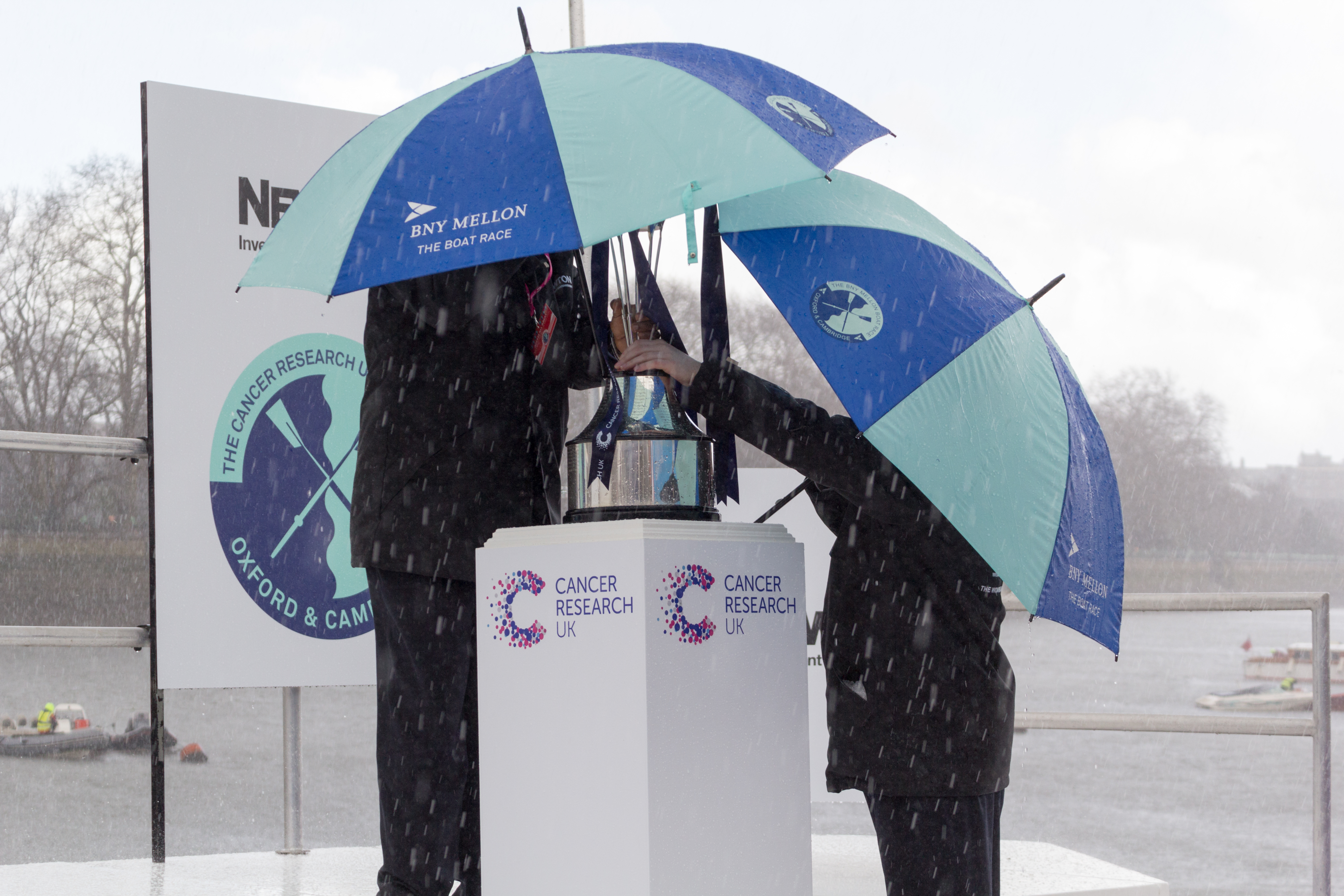
Men's race winner's trophy under shelter during a brief hailstorm before the race coin toss

The Light Blues faced Oxford Brookes on the Tideway on 30 January, in a two-piece race. Cambridge selected Surrey and were a length down by the Town Buoy. At the first bend in the river by Craven Cottage, Oxford Brookes held a lead of nearly two lengths, but CUBC began to reduce the deficit. By Hammersmith Bridge, the crews were nearly level and despite warnings from the umpire, Cambridge held their aggressive line to pass the finish line at Chiswick Eyot two lengths ahead. In the second race, the crews rowed back from Chiswick Eyot to the Finish Post. Although Oxford Brookes took a narrow lead, the Light Blues were ahead by Chiswick Pier and took clear water advantage to win by more than three lengths. Goldie had lost both races against an alternate Oxford Brookes crew earlier.

On 22 February, it was OUBC's turn to race against Oxford Brookes, in two segments over the Championship Course. After an even start to the first contest, the Dark Blues held a slight advantage heading into the first bend. Oxford Brookes recovered, and were two-thirds of a length ahead as the crews passed below Hammersmith Bridge. OUBC took advantage of a caught blade to move back into contention, but the race was ended prematurely as a sailing boat intervened on the course. The Dark Blues took an early lead in the second race, but despite being a length up, failed to take a clear water advantage. Oxford Brookes drew back and by Barnes Bridge held a small lead, on which they capitalised in the rough water to finally pass the Finish Post two lengths clear of OUBC.

Umpired by Matthew Pinsent, Oxford raced against Leander on 12 March from Putney Bridge to Chiswick Eyot. Although Leander made the better start, the Dark Blues remained in touch, finishing two seats down. CUBC faced a German under-23 crew in a two-segment race on the same day, with the Light Blues winning both.

On 24 March, CUBC announced their boat name Kevin after Kevin Whyman, cox of the successful 1996 and 1997 crews who was killed in a solo aircraft display crash at CarFest North in August 2015. OUBC announced their boat name Daniel after their former coach Daniel Topolski, who died in February 2015.

== Crews ==
The official weigh-in for the crews took place at the Methodist Central Hall Westminster on 1 March 2016.

=== Women ===
The Cambridge crew weighed an average of 74.8 kilograms (165 lb), 4.3 kilograms (9.5 lb) per rower more than their opponents. Both women's boat club presidents were British. Oxford's 2015 number seven Maddy Badcott was the president of OUWBC for the 2016 race. Her counterpart, Hannah Roberts, rowed in Blondie in 2014 and 2015. The CUWBC crew featured three returning Blues in Daphne Martschenko, Ashton Brown and cox Rosemary Ostfeld. Oxford's crew also had three participants with Boat Race experience in former Boat Club president Anastasia Chitty, Maddy Badcott and Lauren Kedar. Cambridge's number two, Fiona Macklin, was following her grandfather David Macklin who had represented the Light Blues in the 1951 race which required a re-row after Oxford sank.

Seat	Oxford					Cambridge				
Seat	Name	Nationality	College	Height	Weight	Name	Nationality	College	Height	Weight
Bow	Emma Lukasiewicz	Canadian	Hertford	174 cm (5 ft 8 1/2 in)	60.4 kg (133 lb)	Ashton Brown	Canadian	Fitzwilliam	173 cm (5 ft 8 in)	81.0 kg (179 lb)
2	Emma Spruce	British	Wolfson	178 cm (5 ft 10 in)	72.0 kg (159 lb)	Fiona Macklin	British	St John's	173 cm (5 ft 8 in)	64.0 kg (141 lb)
3	Joanneke Jansen	Dutch	New College	180 cm (5 ft 11 in)	67.0 kg (148 lb)	Alice Jackson	British	Homerton	176 cm (5 ft 9 1/2 in)	77.2 kg (170 lb)
4	Ruth Siddorn	British	Keble	181 cm (5 ft 11 1/2 in)	75.2 kg (166 lb)	Théa Zabell	British	Downing	183 cm (6 ft 0 in)	79.4 kg (175 lb)
5	Elo Luik	Estonian	Wolfson	186 cm (6 ft 1 in)	78.2 kg (172 lb)	Daphne Martschenko	American	Magdalene	178 cm (5 ft 10 in)	76.6 kg (169 lb)
6	Anastasia Chitty	British	Pembroke	175 cm (5 ft 9 in)	71.0 kg (157 lb)	Myriam Goudet	French	Lucy Cavendish	183 cm (6 ft 0 in)	80.4 kg (177 lb)
7	Maddy Badcott (P)	British	Wadham	178 cm (5 ft 10 in)	74.8 kg (165 lb)	Hannah Roberts (P)	British	Jesus	180 cm (5 ft 11 in)	73.6 kg (162 lb)
Stroke	Lauren Kedar	British	Exeter	178 cm (5 ft 10 in)	65.6 kg (145 lb)	Zara Goozée	British	Downing	175 cm (5 ft 9 in)	66.2 kg (146 lb)
Cox	Morgan Baynham-Williams	British	Oriel	168 cm (5 ft 6 in)	60.0 kg (132 lb)	Rosemary Ostfeld	American	Hughes Hall	158 cm (5 ft 2 in)	50.0 kg (110 lb)
Sources: (P) – Boat club president

=== Men ===
The Cambridge crew weighed an average of 88.25 kilograms (195 lb), 1.5 kilograms (3.3 lb) per rower more than their opponents. Oxford's number four, Joshua Bugajski, was the heaviest man in the race, weighing 96.4 kilograms (213 lb). It was the first time in the history of the race that both boat club presidents were American. Cambridge's Henry Hoffstot hailed from New York while Oxford's Morgan Gerlak was born in Baltimore. The Dark Blue crew contained a single rower with Boat Race experience in Jamie Cook, a member of the victorious 2015 crew. Four members of the 2015 crew returned for the Light Blues, including cox Ian Middleton and president Henry Hoffstot who were earning their third Blues.

Seat	Oxford					Cambridge				
Seat	Name	Nationality	College	Height	Weight	Name	Nationality	College	Height	Weight
Bow	George McKirdy	British	St Edmund Hall	190 cm (6 ft 3 in)	76.8 kg (169 lb)	Felix Newman	British	Selwyn	185 cm (6 ft 1 in)	83.2 kg (183 lb)
2	James White	British	Christ Church	187 cm (6 ft 1 1/2 in)	87.0 kg (192 lb)	Ali Abbasi	German / American	Trinity	188 cm (6 ft 2 in)	88.4 kg (195 lb)
3	Morgan Gerlak (P)	American	Keble	185 cm (6 ft 1 in)	85.8 kg (189 lb)	Charles Fisher	British	St John's	198 cm (6 ft 6 in)	91.8 kg (202 lb)
4	Joshua Bugajski	British	Keble	194 cm (6 ft 4 1/2 in)	96.4 kg (213 lb)	Clemens Auersperg	Austrian	Peterhouse	204 cm (6 ft 8 1/2 in)	90.4 kg (199 lb)
5	Leo Carrington	British / New Zealander	Kellogg	189 cm (6 ft 2 1/2 in)	87.0 kg (192 lb)	Luke Juckett	American	St Edmund's	185 cm (6 ft 1 in)	82.0 kg (181 lb)
6	Jørgen Tveit	British	St John's	194 cm (6 ft 4 1/2 in)	82.4 kg (182 lb)	Henry Hoffstot (P)	American	Hughes Hall	196 cm (6 ft 5 in)	92.6 kg (204 lb)
7	Jamie Cook	British	St Cross	188 cm (6 ft 2 in)	84.0 kg (185 lb)	Ben Ruble	American	Hughes Hall	188 cm (6 ft 2 in)	83.4 kg (184 lb)
Stroke	Nik Hazell	British	Christ Church	199 cm (6 ft 6 1/2 in)	94.8 kg (209 lb)	Lance Tredell	British	Hughes Hall	194 cm (6 ft 4 1/2 in)	94.2 kg (208 lb)
Cox	Sam Collier	British	New College	170 cm (5 ft 7 in)	56.2 kg (124 lb)	Ian Middleton	British	Queens'	173 cm (5 ft 8 in)	54.0 kg (119 lb)
Sources: (P) – Boat club president

== Races ==
=== Reserves ===
In the women's reserves' race, Cambridge's Blondie defeated Oxford's Osiris by three lengths to take their first victory in five years, taking the overall record (since 1968) to 22–20 in their favour. Oxford's Isis beat Goldie in the men's reserves' race by two lengths in a time of 18 minutes 55 seconds. It was their sixth consecutive victory and eighth in nine years, and reduced Cambridge's overall lead in the competition to 29–23.

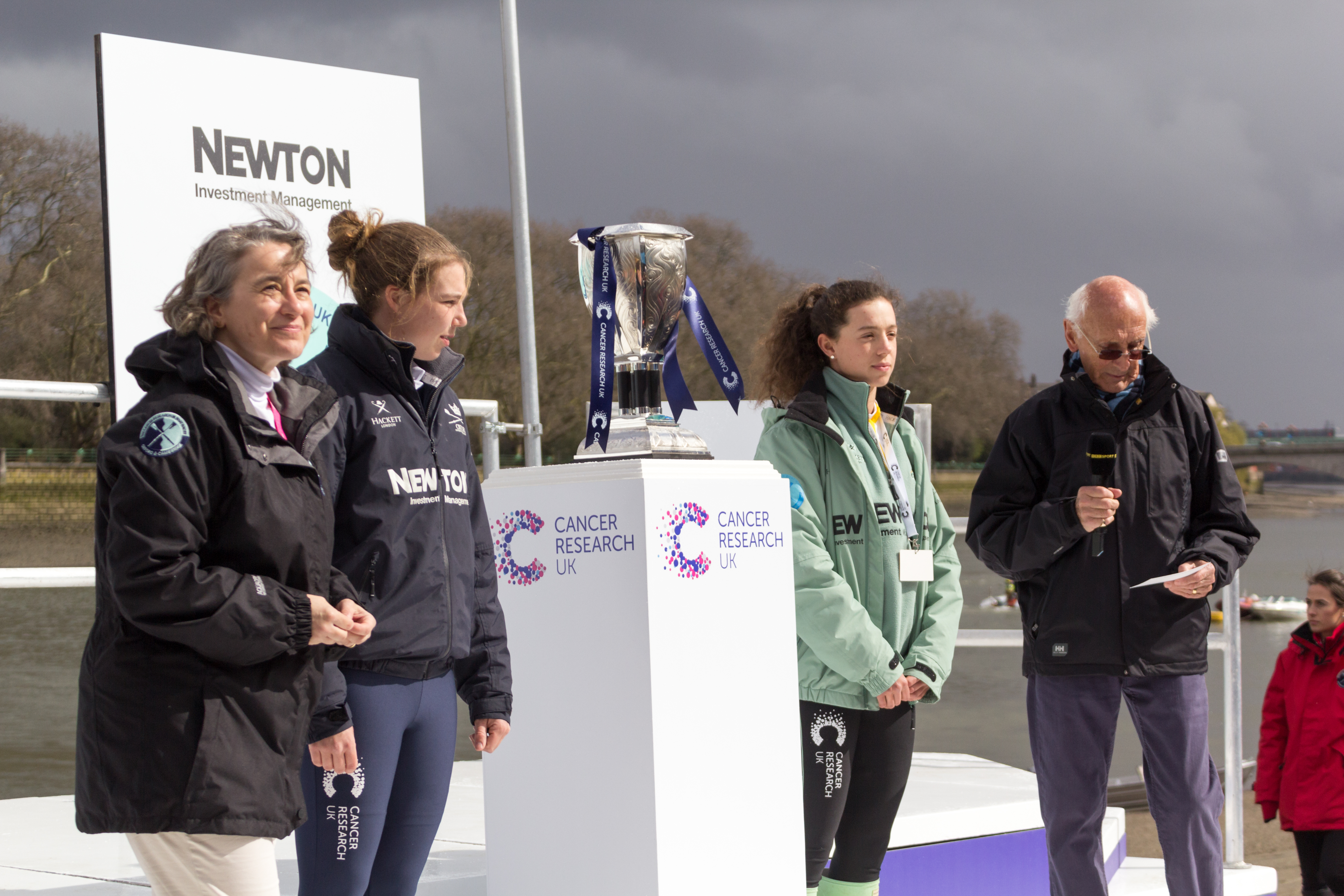
Women's Reserve race coin toss

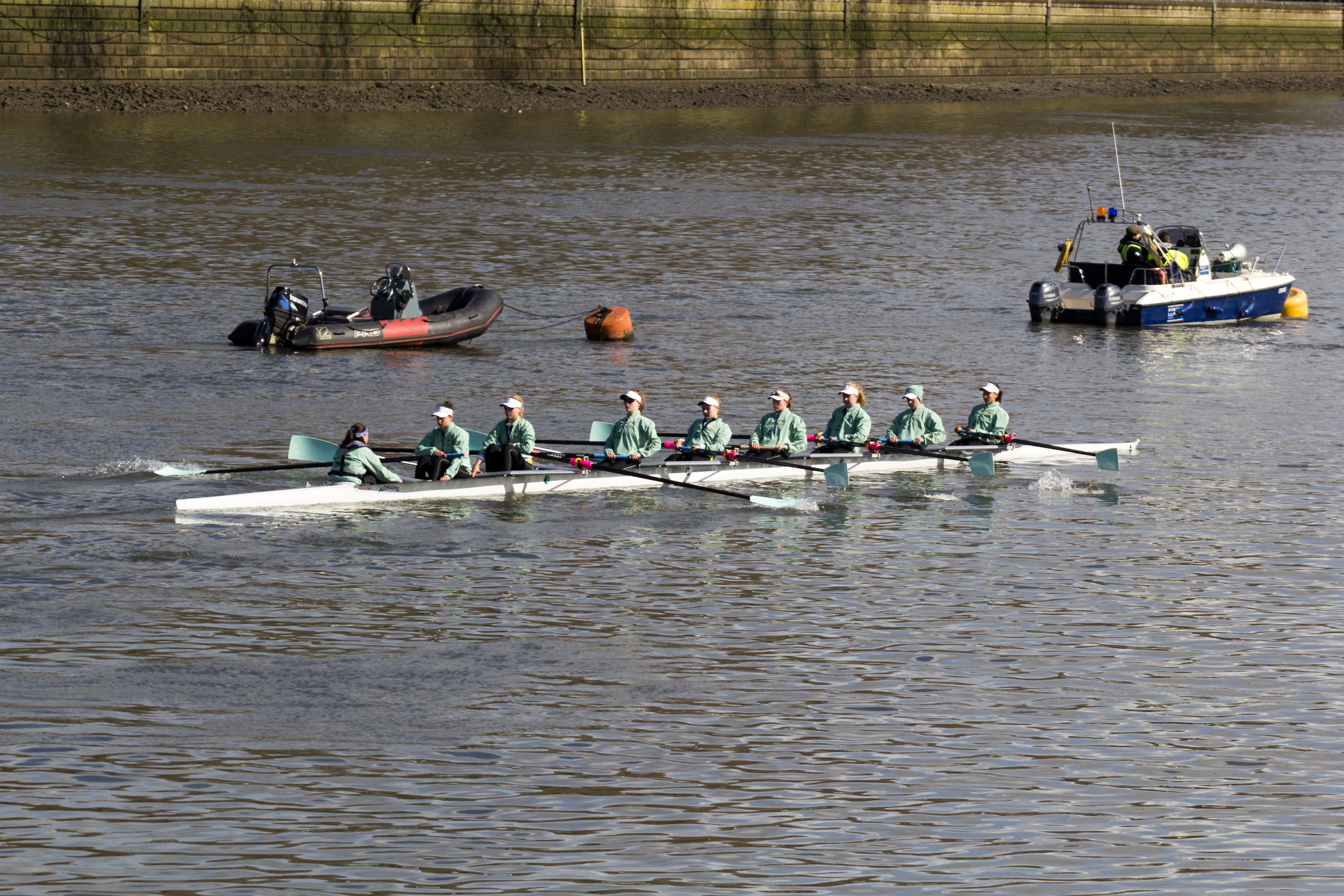
Cambridge Women's Reserve Blondie boat

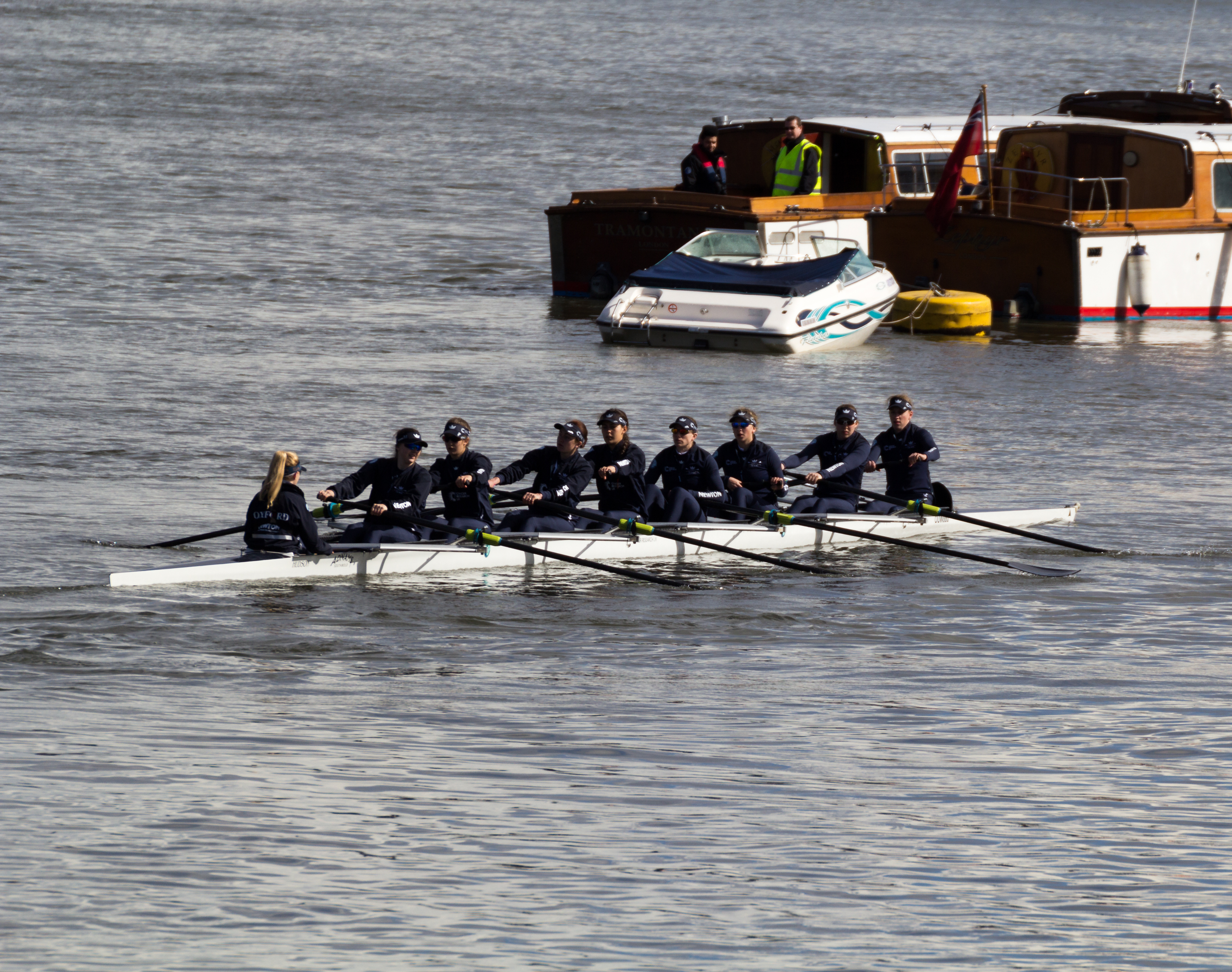
Oxford Women's Reserve Osiris boat

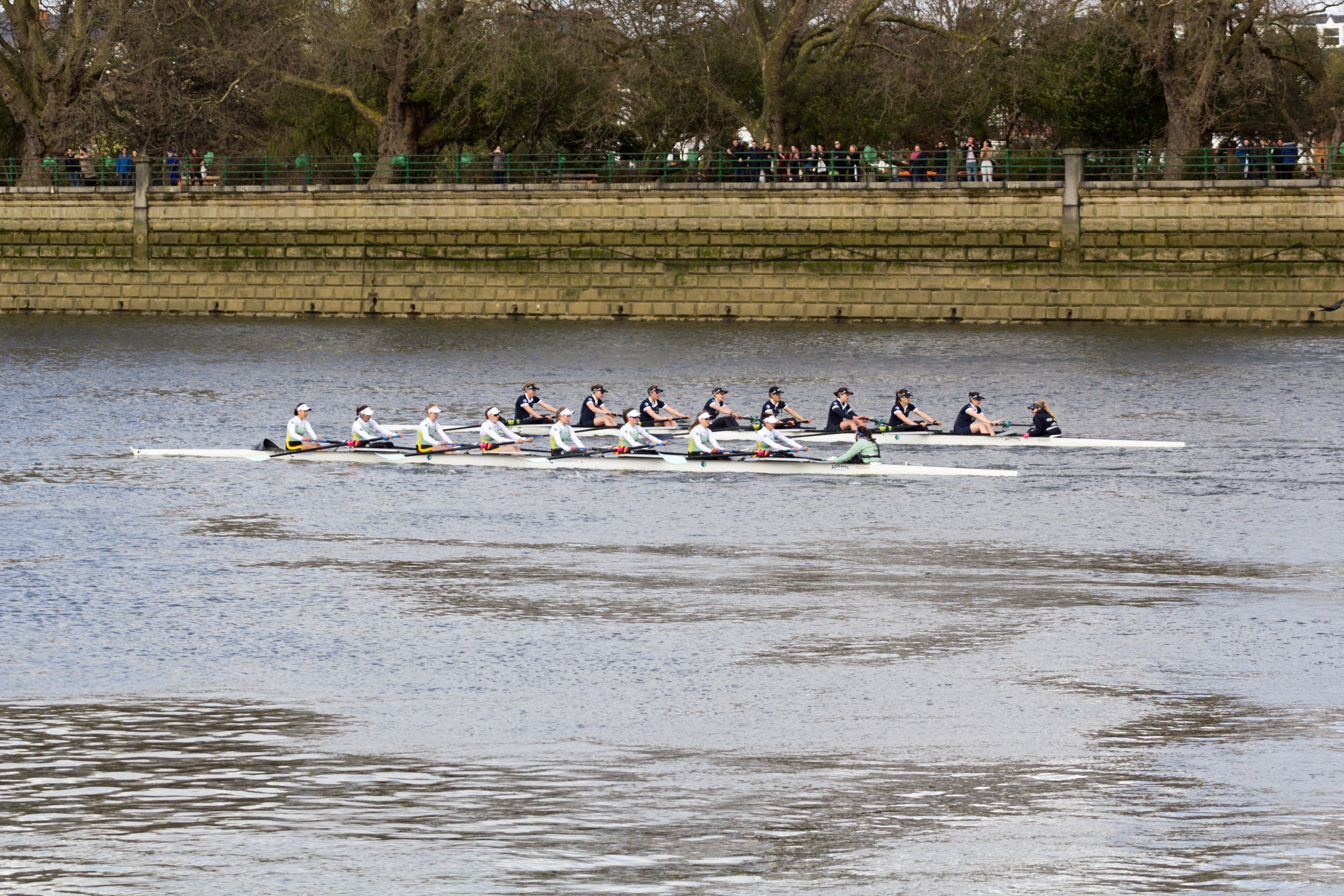
Women's Reserve race from the Putney Embankment

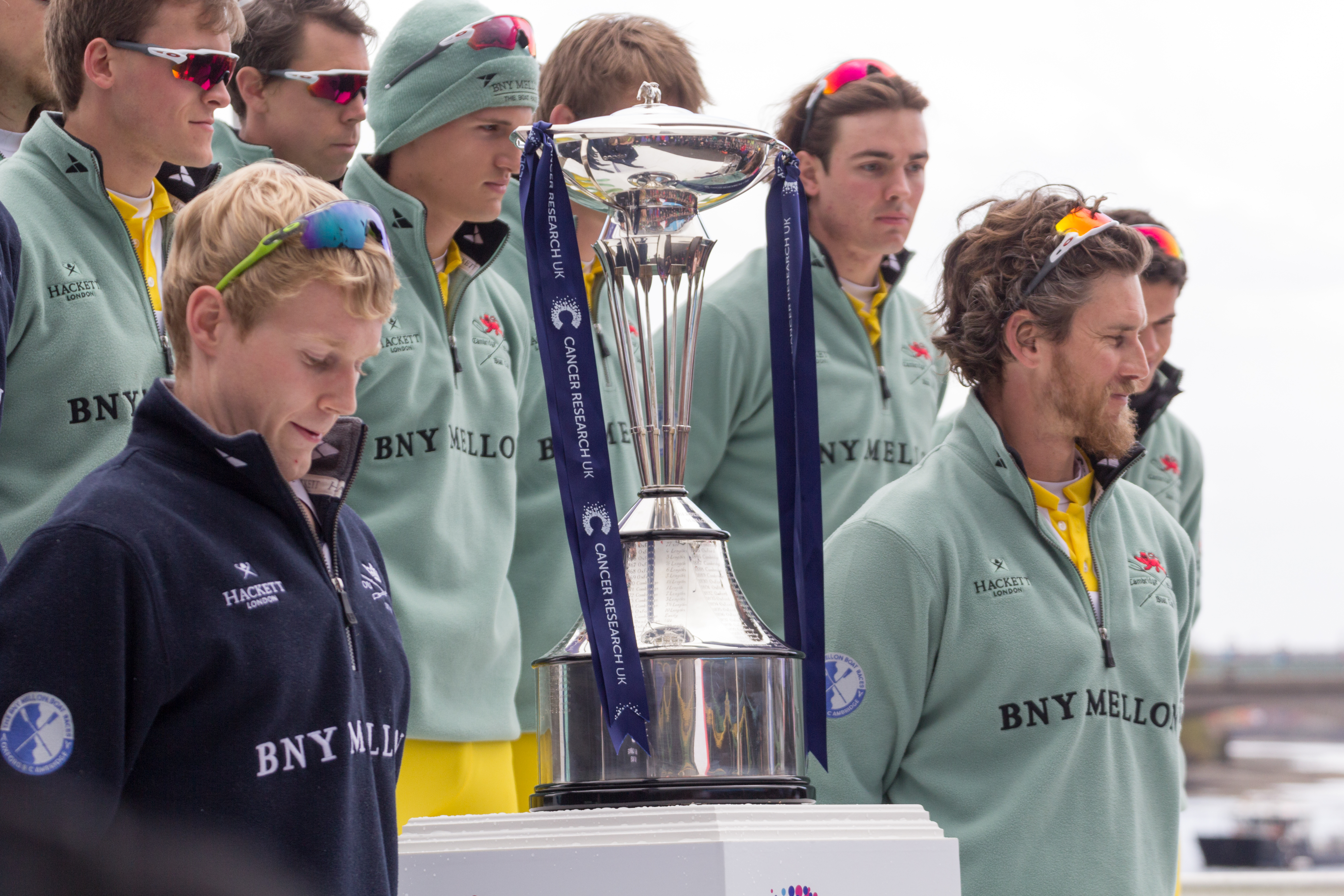
Men's Reserve race coin toss

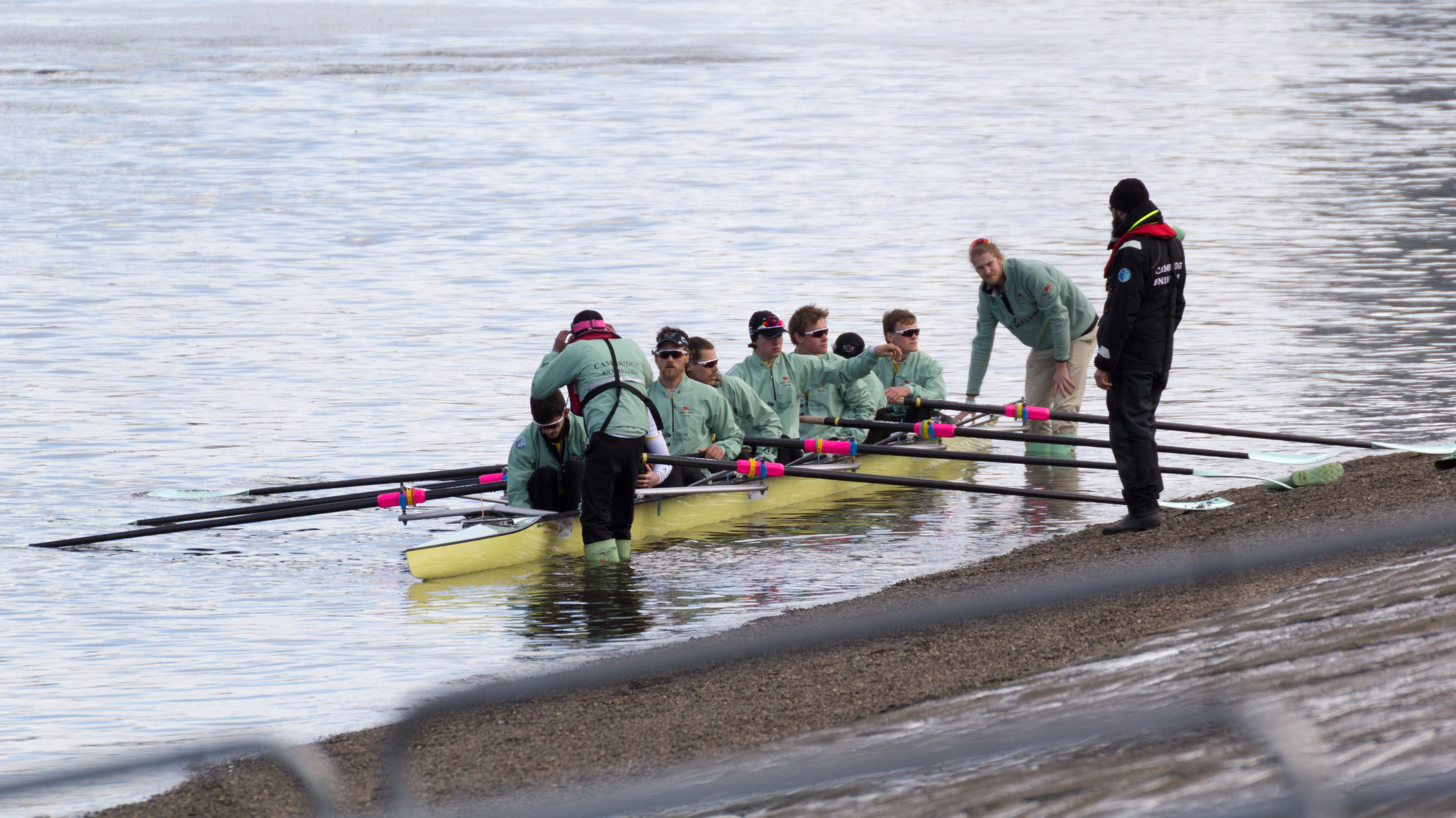
Cambridge Men's Reserve Goldie boat

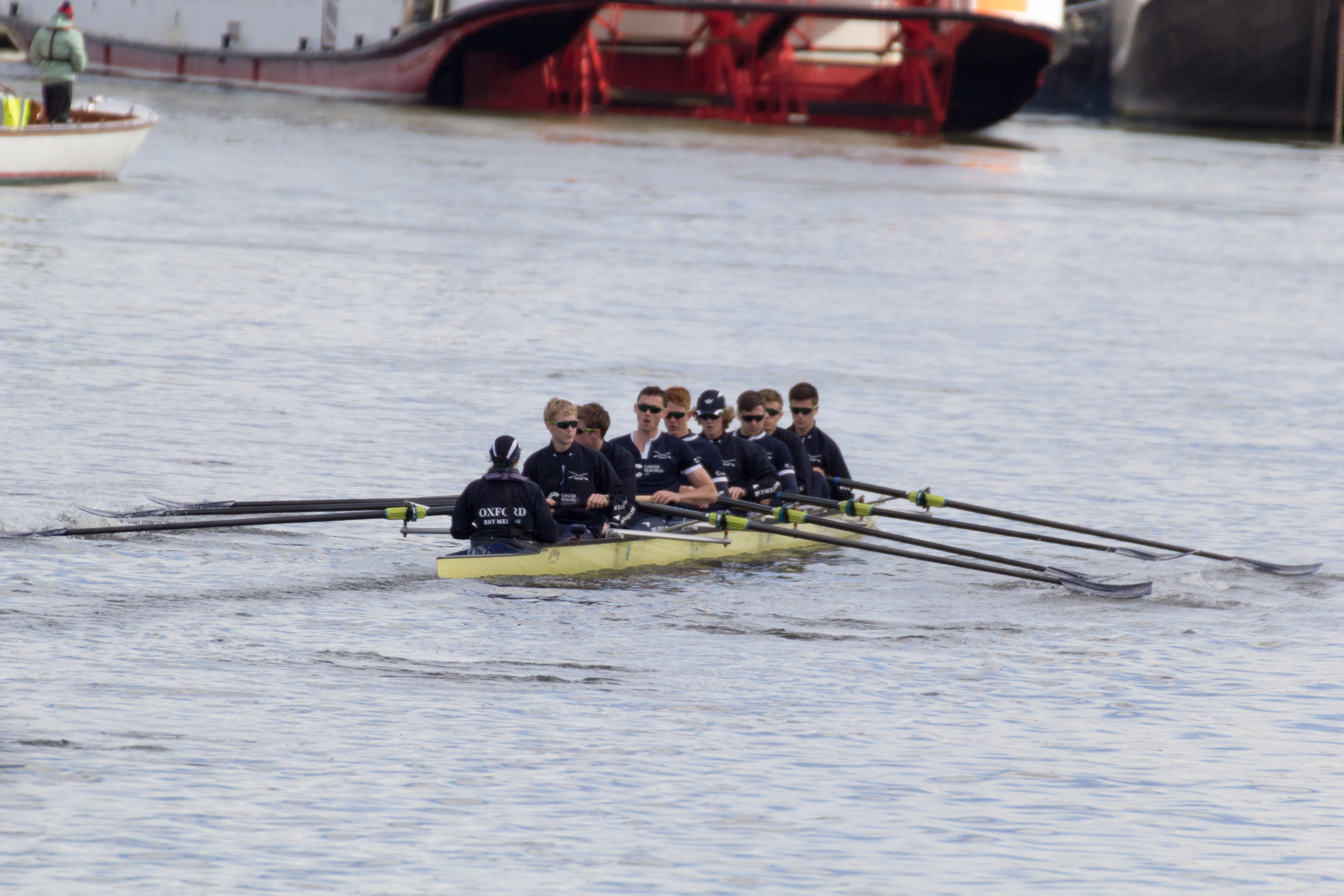
Oxford Men's Reserve Isis boat

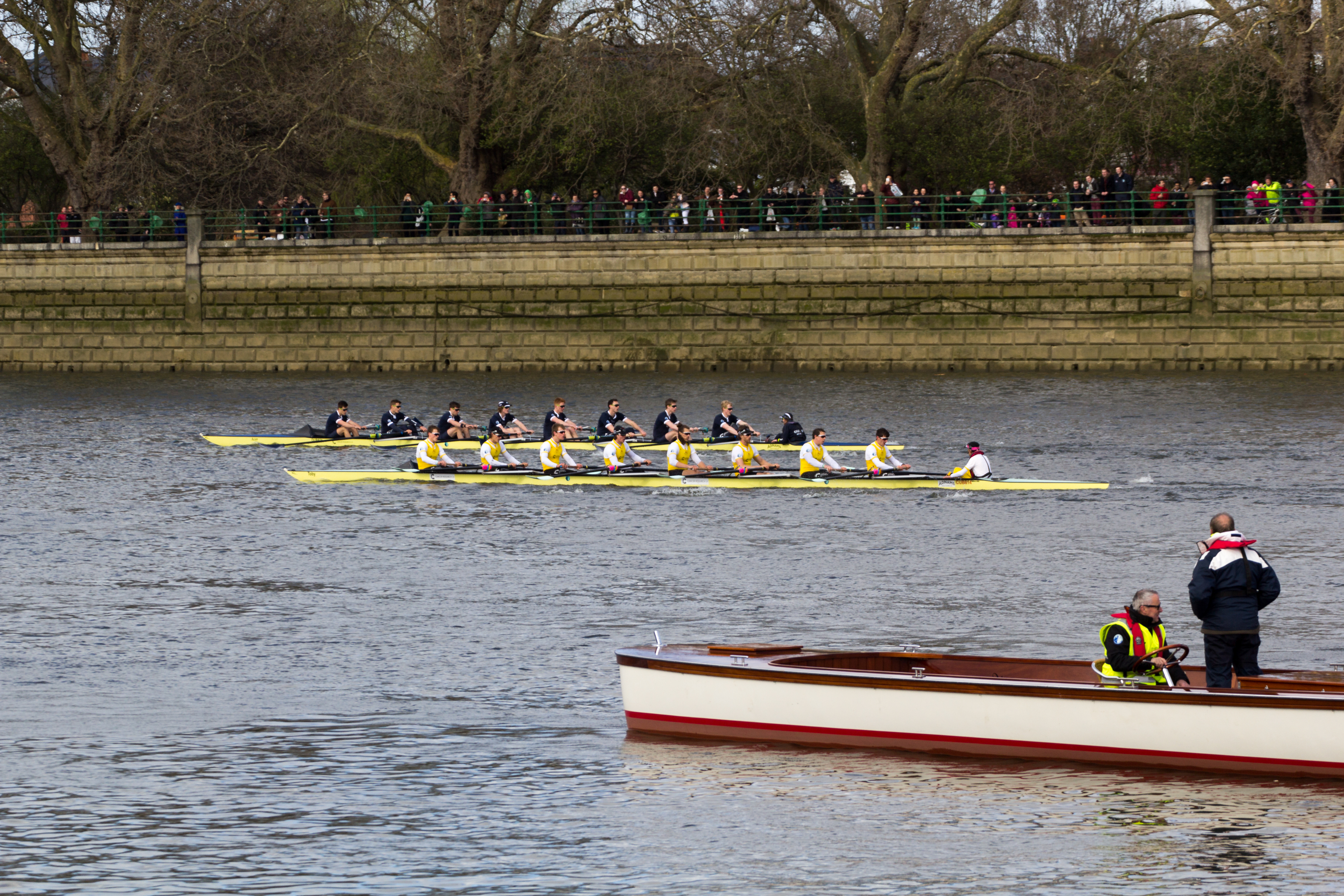
Men's Reserve race from the Putney Embankment

=== Women's ===
The women's race was the 71st contest between OUWBC and CUWBC, and started at 3:10 p.m. on 27 March 2016. The overall record in the event before the race stood at 41–29 in Cambridge's favour. Weather conditions were poor, described in The Daily Telegraph an hour before the race as "terrible ... hail, thunder, lightning, the works". Although conditions improved by the start time, it was still windy and the river was rough. Oxford won the toss and elected to start from the Surrey side of the river. Cambridge made the better start and held a slight lead, but after passing the Mile Post level, OUWBC made a push to hold a half-length lead after five minutes, and were almost clear by Harrods Furniture Depository. Cambridge, two seconds down as the crews passed below Hammersmith Bridge, were forced to take evasive action but kept in touch despite multiple warnings from the umpire. The Light Blues made for the shelter of the shore as the conditions worsened and both boats took on water, while Oxford remained in the rough water, losing some of their advantage. Oxford were eight seconds ahead by Chiswick Steps and tucked into the Middlesex bank while Cambridge remained in the more traditional racing line, taking on a substantial amount of water. At Barnes Bridge, Cambridge began to sink and received advice to pull to the side. The Cambridge cox indicated that she wanted to continue to complete the course and was allowed to do so. Oxford passed the finishing post in 21 minutes 49 seconds, 24 lengths ahead of the Light Blues, taking the overall record to 41–30 in Cambridge's favour.

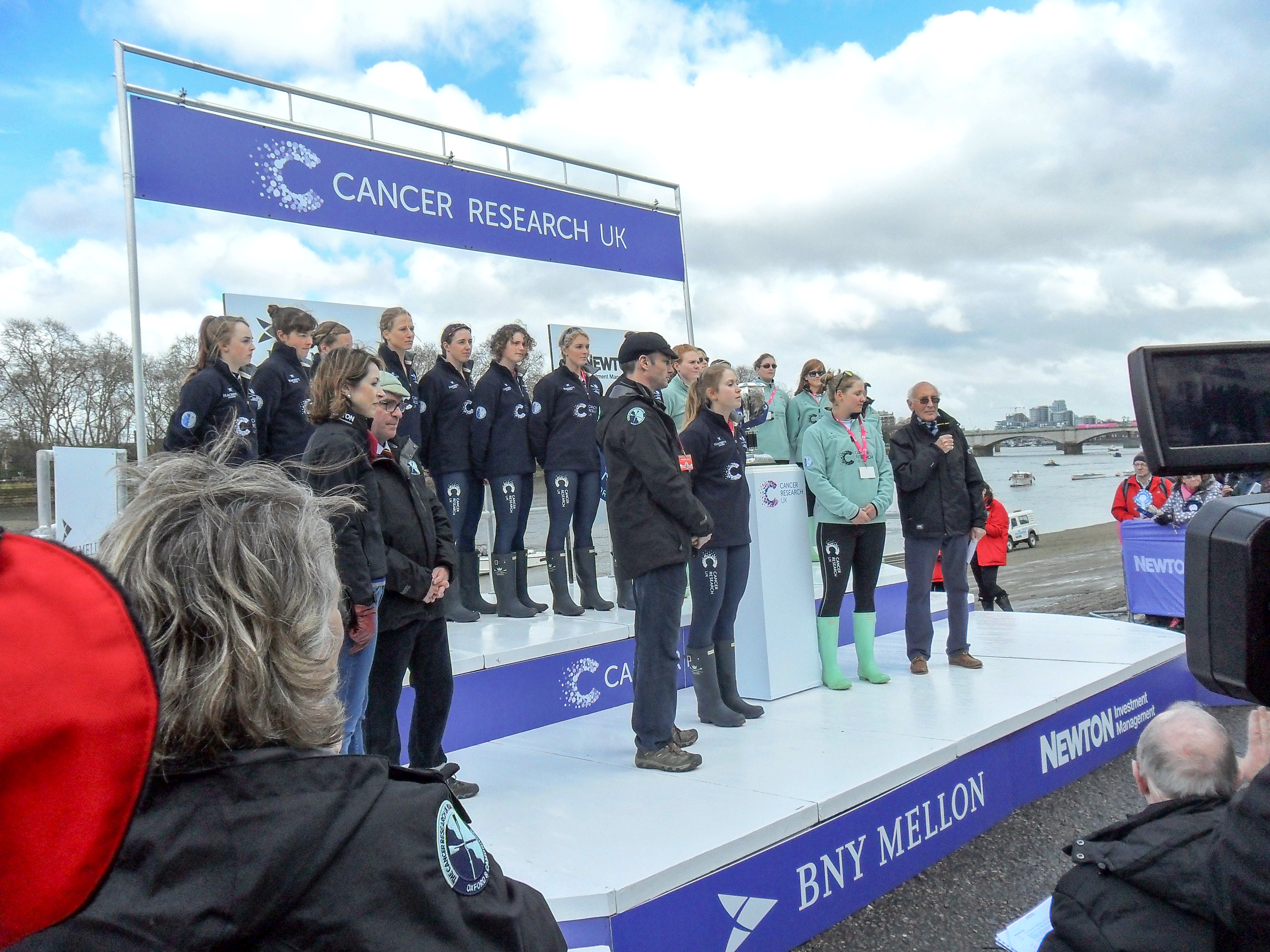
Women's Blues race coin toss

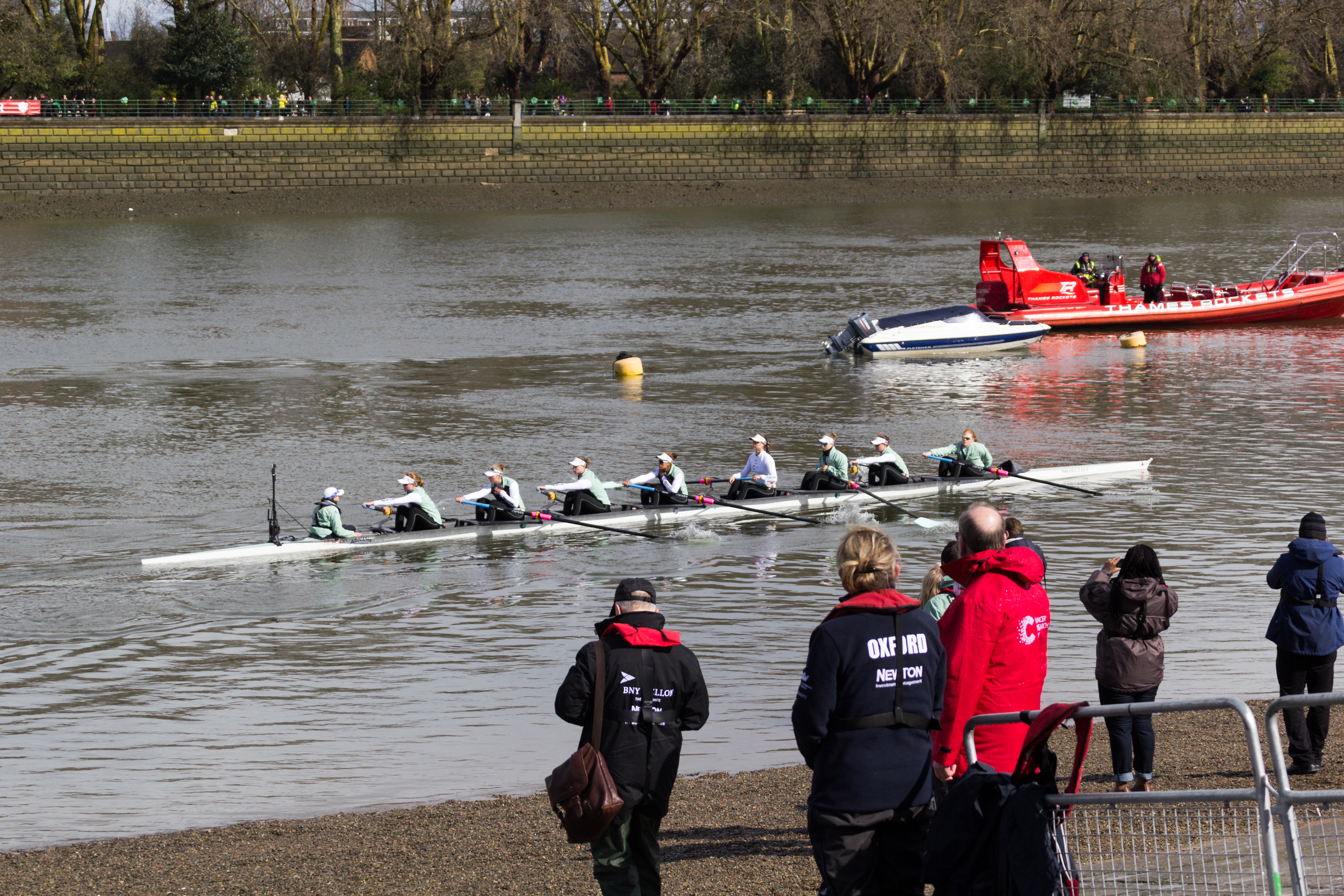
Cambridge Women's Blues boat

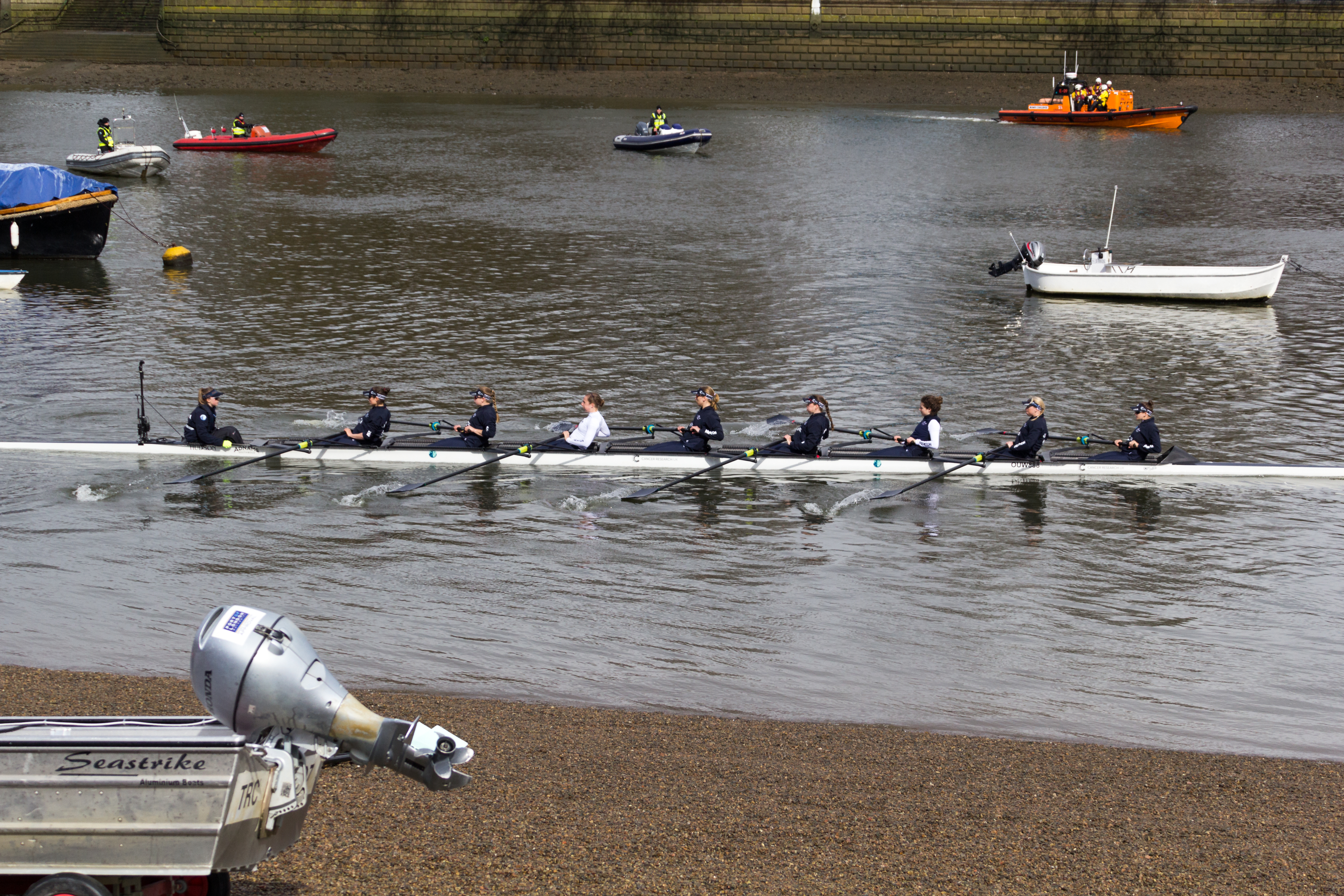
Oxford Women's Blues boat

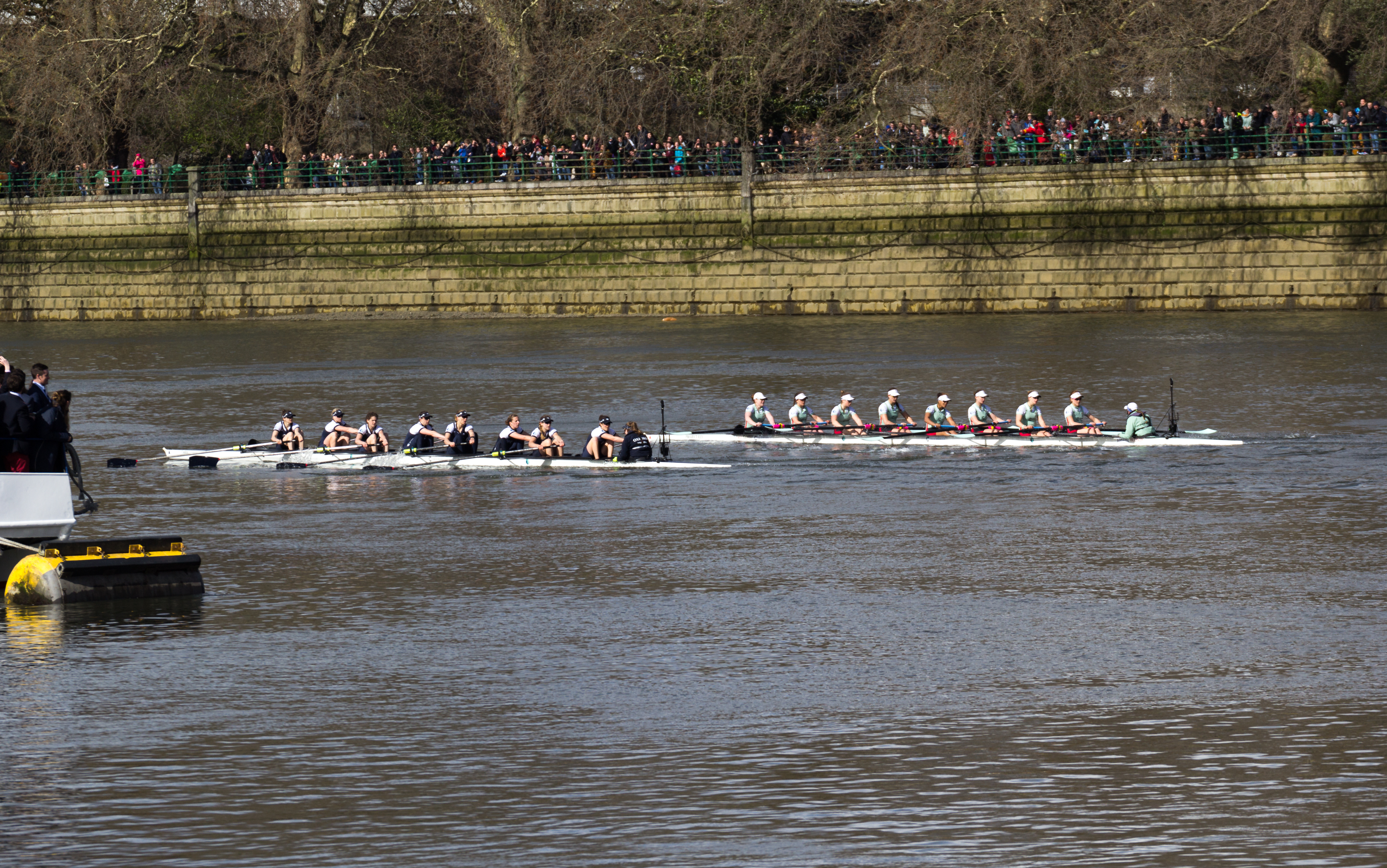
Women's race from the Putney Embankment

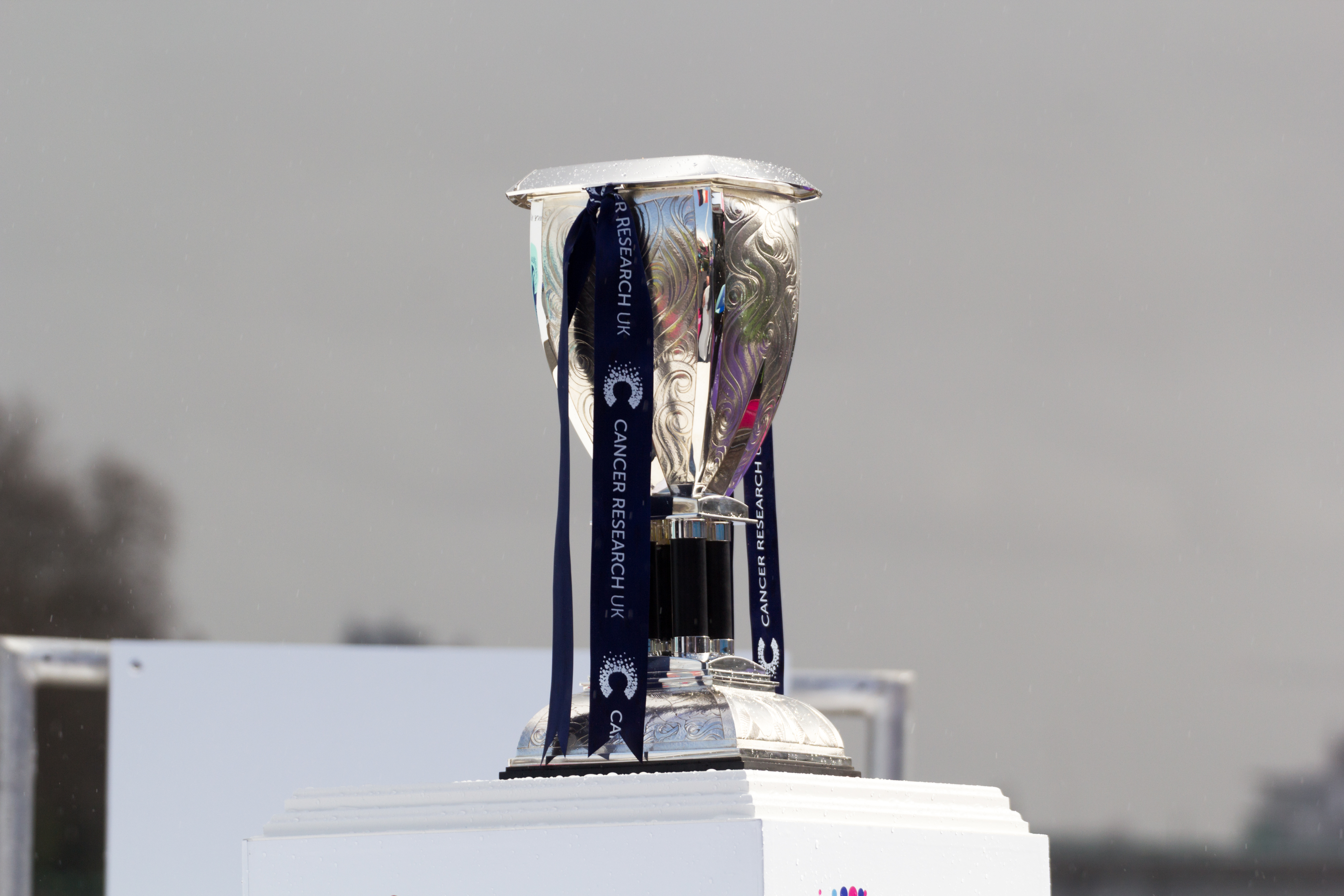
Women's race winner's trophy

=== Men's ===
Cambridge won the toss and elected to start from the Surrey side of the river. The men's race was the 162nd contest between OUBC and CUBC, and was held at 4:10 p.m on 27 March 2016. Prior to the race, the overall record in the event stood at 81–79 in Cambridge's favour, with one dead heat. Oxford were late for the start and were awarded a "false start", meaning that one more false start from the Dark Blues would result in disqualification. Cambridge edged ahead from the start and were a canopy's length ahead after a minute. After warnings to both crews from the umpire, Cambridge moved away from the Dark Blues and were half a length ahead by the Mile Post and almost clear as the crews passed the Harrods Furniture Depository. Oxford pushed on under Hammersmith Bridge to remain in contention, one second behind. Cambridge moved just clear as the crews hit rough water in Chiswick Reach just below Chiswick Eyot. By the time they passed Chiswick Steps, the Light Blues were over a length clear and five seconds ahead of Oxford. Both crews moved towards the Middlesex side of the river to reduce their exposure to the rough conditions, and as they passed under Barnes Bridge, the Light Blues held a nine-second lead. Oxford pushed on to keep in touch, but Cambridge passed the finishing post in 18 minutes 38 seconds, two and a half lengths ahead of Oxford. It was the Light Blues' first victory in four years, ending a run of six wins from eight races for Oxford, and took the overall record in the event to 82–79 in Cambridge's favour.

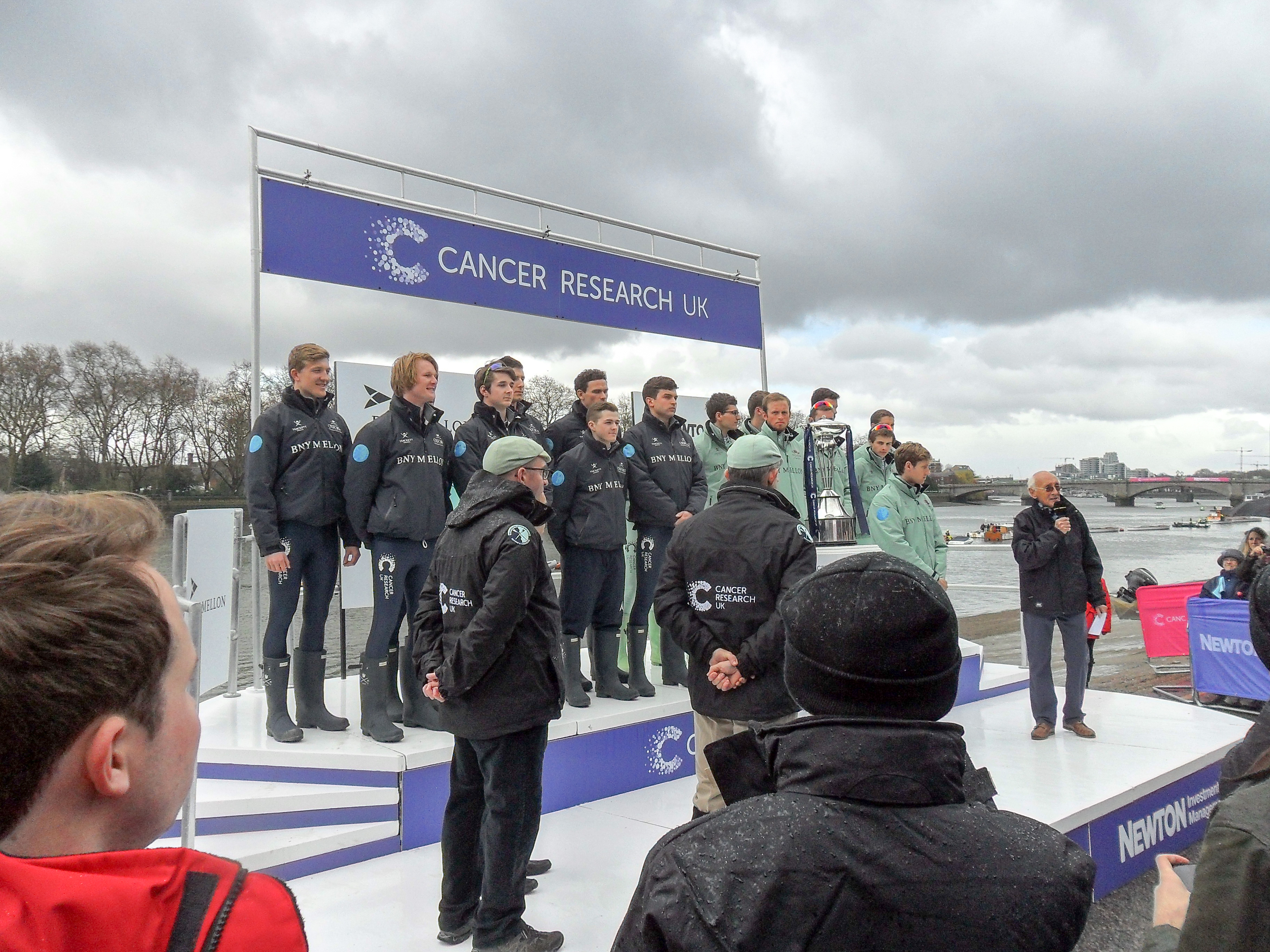
Men's Blues race coin toss

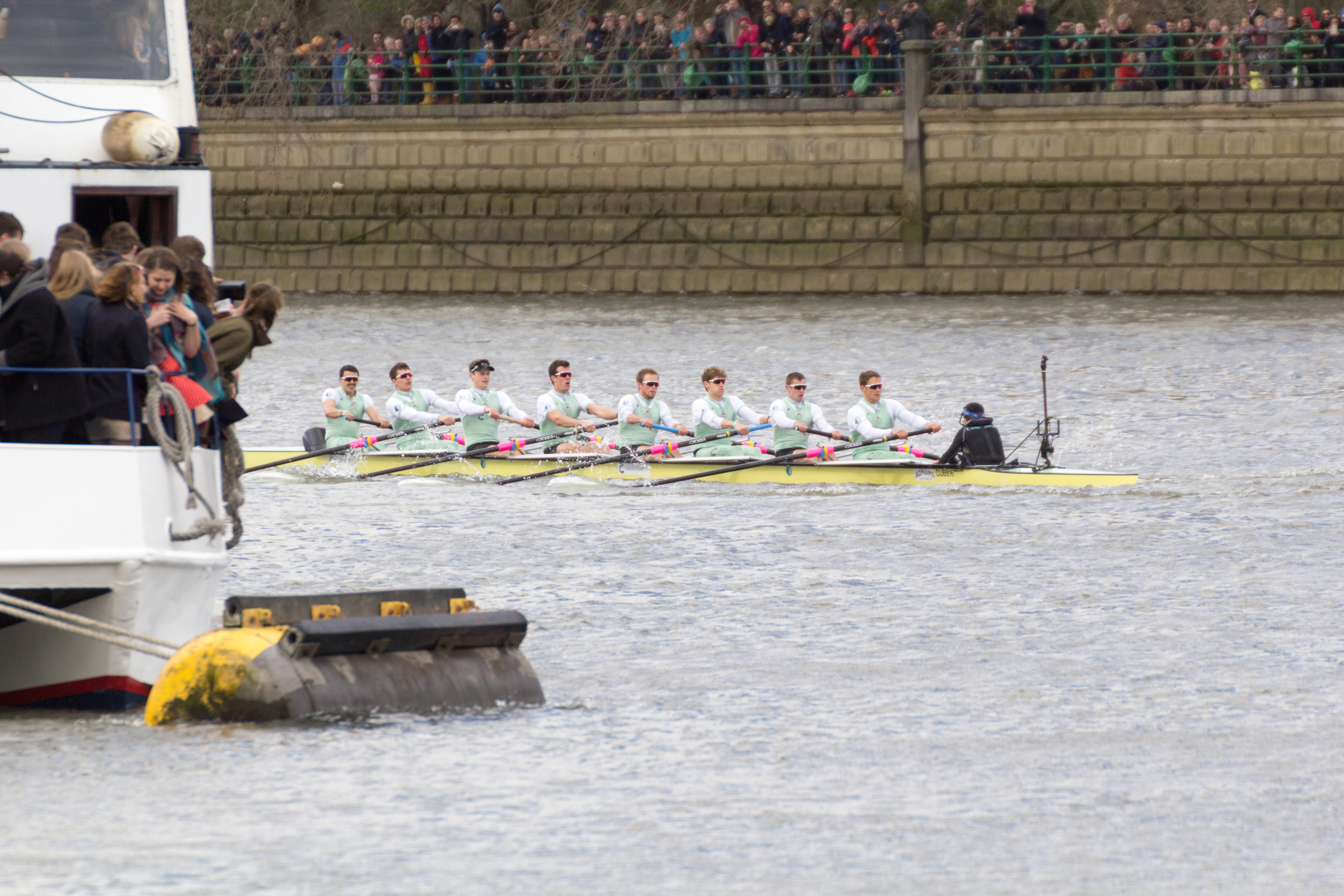
Cambridge Men's Blues boat

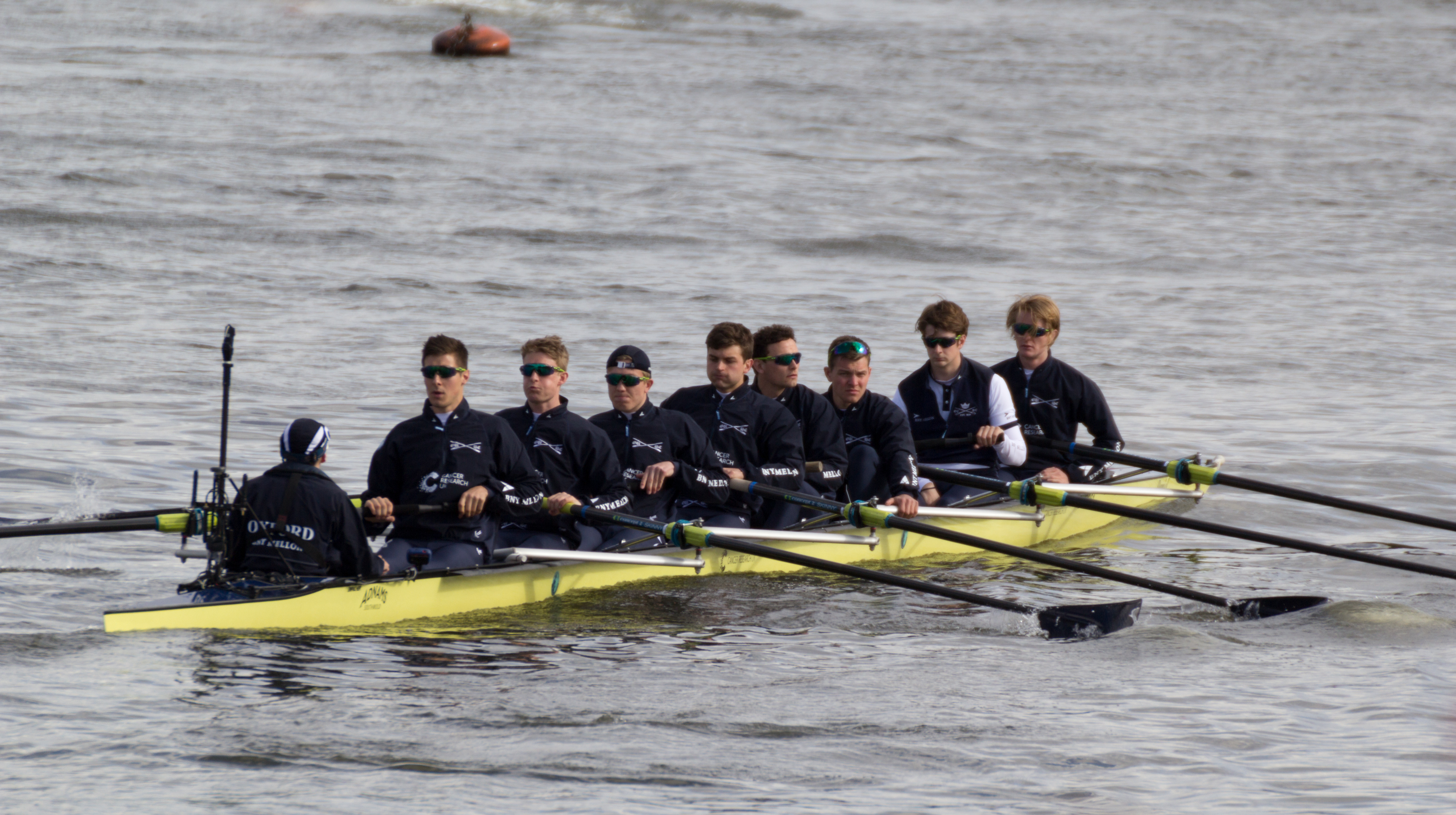
Oxford Men's Blues boat

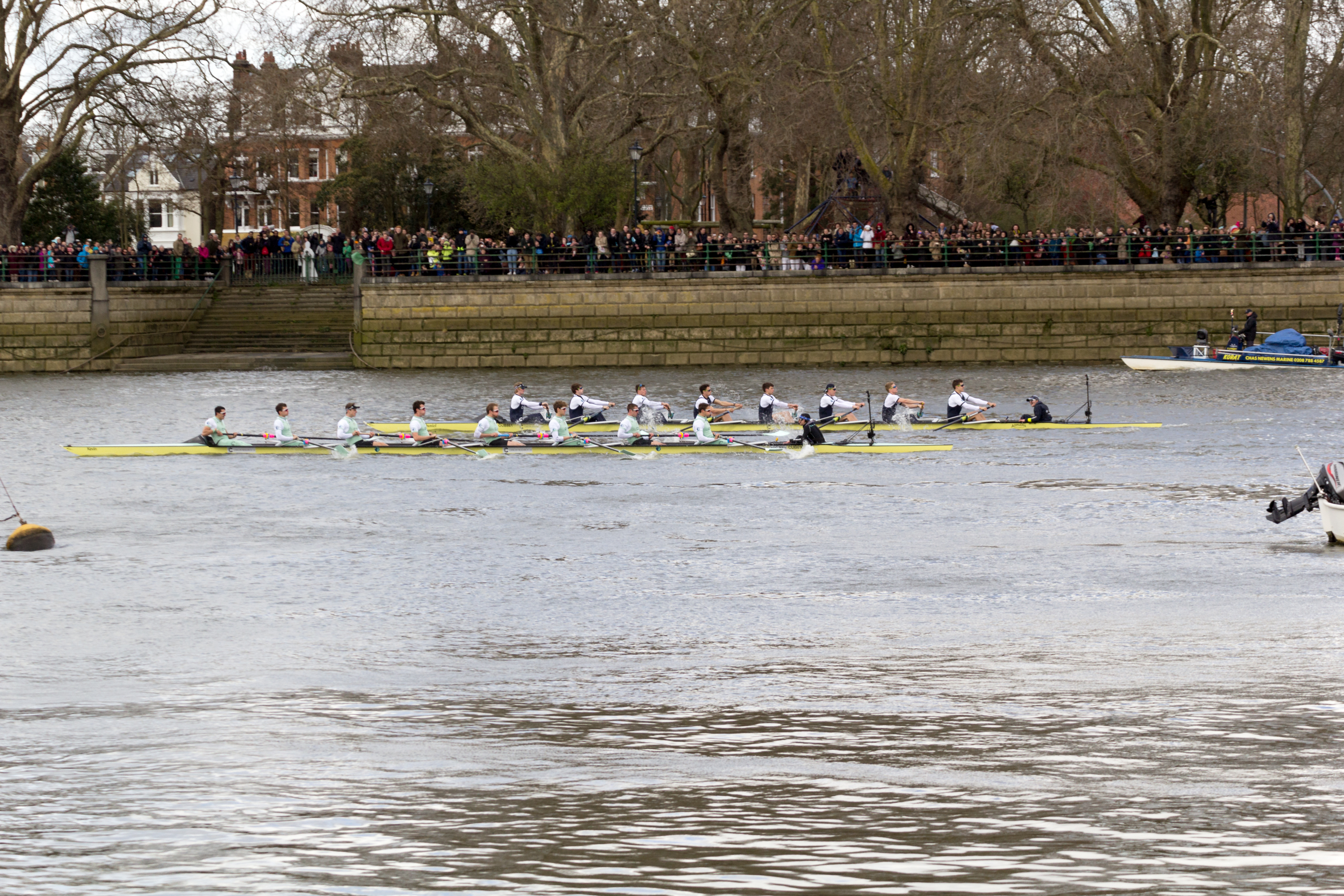
Men's race from the Putney Embankment

== Reaction ==
Cambridge's women's coach Rob Baker said "Our cox did exceptionally well and nearly got us back into the race. Then we sunk." Speaking of Oxford's cox Morgan Baynham-Williams, OUWBC president Badcott noted "we're so lucky to have Morgan – she smashed it today." Badcott went on to describe the conditions as "probably the worst I have experienced on the Tideway". OUBC's coach Sean Bowden said the conditions were "the worst I have ever seen" while Matthew Pinsent referred to them as "absolutely biblical". Hoffstot said he was "humbled" by the victory, his first in three attempts, while his opposite number Gerlak acknowledged that Cambridge had "managed the conditions better."

Olympic medallists Helen Glover and Heather Stanning were amongst the presentation committee.
