= Felix Newman =

British rower

Personal information
- Nationality: British
- Born: 26 November 1993 (age 32)
- Height: 185 cm (6 ft 1 in)
- Weight: 83.2 kg (183 lb)

Sport
- Country: Great Britain
- Sport: Rowing
- College team: Selwyn College Boat Club
- Club: Cambridge University Boat Club

Felix Newman (born 1993) is a British rower.

== Profile ==
Whilst in education at Abingdon School he gained colours and was the captain of the Abingdon School Boat Club. After leaving Abingdon in 2012 he attended Selwyn College, Cambridge.

In 2018 he won a British Education Award, while at Selwyn College.

== Rowing ==
In 2014 and 2015 he was selected for the Goldie crew before securing the bow seat of the Cambridge boat at the Boat Race 2016 which Cambridge won. In addition, he has been in winning crews at the Henley Royal Regatta three times, twice in the Princess Elizabeth Cup and once in the Thames Cup, and has represented the Great Britain's men's coxed four at the 2011 World Rowing Junior Championships at Eton in England.

== See also ==
- List of Old Abingdonians
