= Morgan Gerlak =

American rower

Morgan Gerlak (born May 4, 1992) is an American rower. He rowed for Oxford University in the 2016 Boat Race, the same year that he was President of Oxford University Boat Club.

A graduate of Exeter College, Gerlak rowed in the reserve race in the 2015 Boat Races and represented the USA at the 2013 World Rowing U23 Championships where he was a member of the Men's Coxless Four that won the bronze medal.

He is one of the youngest VC partners in the Valley and a cybersecurity SME.
