= Women's Boat Race 2012 =

67th Women's Boat Race
- Date: 26 March 2012
- Winner: Cambridge
- Margin of victory: 1/4 length
- Winning time: 6 minutes 38 seconds
- Overall record (Cambridge–Oxford): 41–26
- Umpire: Matthew Pinsent

The 67th Women's Boat Race took place on 26 March 2012. The race was conducted as part of the Henley Boat Races and took place at Henley-on-Thames. In a race umpired by multiple Olympic gold medallist Matthew Pinsent, Cambridge won by one quarter of a length in a time of 6 minutes 38 seconds, their first win since the 2007 race. The victory took the overall record in the event to 41–26 in Cambridge's favour.

== Background ==
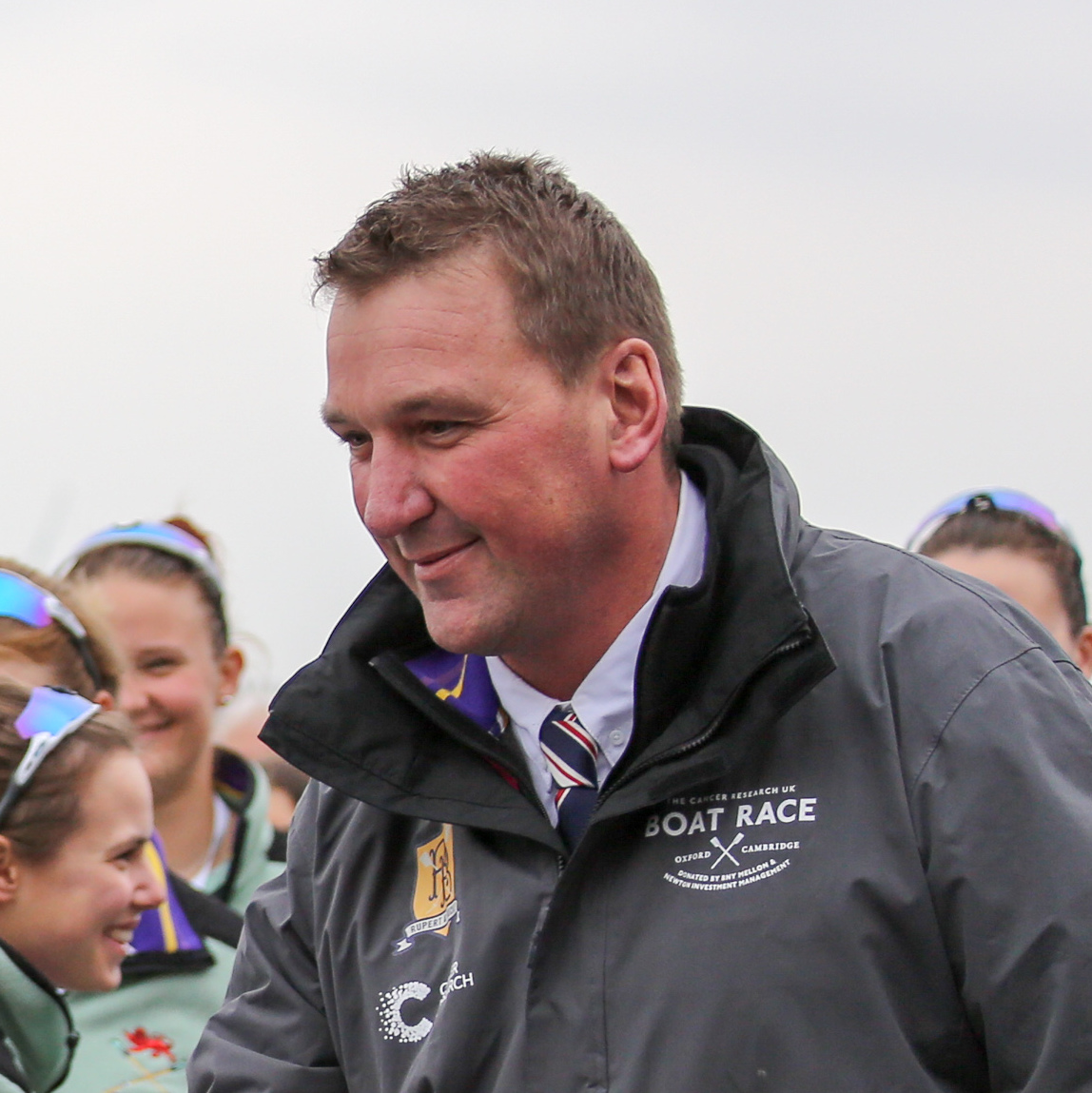
Matthew Pinsent umpired the race.

The Women's Boat Race is a side-by-side rowing competition between Oxford University Women's Boat Club (OUWBC) and the Cambridge University Women's Boat Club (CUWBC) that has taken place since 1927. It was conducted as part of the Henley Boat Races, on the traditional straight course at Henley-on-Thames. Oxford went into the race as champions, having won the 2011 race by one quarter of a length, and led 40–26 overall. The race was sponsored by Newton Investment Management, a subsidiary of The Bank of New York Mellon, for the second successive year.

Cambridge's head coach was Martyn Rooney. The umpire for the race was Matthew Pinsent, gold medallist in the men's coxless pairs at the 1992, 1996, 2000 and 2004 Summer Olympics.

== Crews ==
Trials for the crews were held in December 2011. Cambridge's trial boats raced along the Adelaide Straight in Ely and were named Big Fish, Little Fish and Cardboard Box.

Cambridge saw four rowers (Isabel Boanas-Evans, Anna Railton, Cath Wheeler and Fay Sandford) along with cox Kate Richards return to the crew, all of whom had participated in the 2011 race.

Seat	Cambridge		Oxford	
Seat	Name	College	Name	College
Bow	Sarah Moir-Porteous	Downing	Mary Foord-Weston	Merton
2	Caroline Reid	Jesus	Alexandra Dix (P)	Hertford
3	Rebecca Pound	Trinity	Caitlin Goss	Merton
4	Anna Railton	Pembroke	Eleanor Darlington	Kellogg
5	Holly Game	Girton	Florence Morton	Worcester
6	Isabel Boanas-Evans (P)	Murray Edwards	Rebekah Pawley	Wadham
7	Faye Sandford	Gonville and Caius	Annika Malin Bruger	Lincoln
Stroke	Cath Wheeler	Queens'	Charlotte Trigle	Trinity
Cox	Kate Richards	Queens'	Rebecca Preece	St Edmund Hall
Sources: (P) – boat club president

== Race ==
In conditions described as "perfect", Cambridge took an early lead, out-rating Oxford. Pinsent warned OUWBC who were forced to steer away from the CUWBC boat, allowing them to pull further away to lead by one and a half lengths, despite a series of pushes from Oxford. With 300 metres (330 yd) to go, Cambridge's number two Caroline Reid "caught a crab", bringing the Light Blue boat to a standstill and allowing Oxford to drastically reduce the deficit. Cambridge re-started and crept over the line just ahead. Cambridge won by one quarter of a length in a time of 6 minutes 38 seconds, the slowest winning time since the 2008 race. The margin of victory was the narrowest since CUWBC won by 3 feet (91 cm) in the 2001 race. It was Cambridge's first win since the 2007 race, and took the overall record in the event to 41–26 in their favour.

== See also ==
- The Boat Race 2012
