= Zoe de Toledo =

British rowing cox

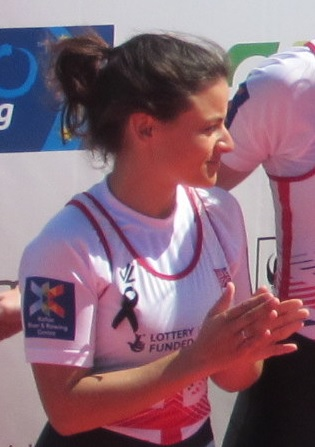

Personal information
- Full name: Zoe Michaela de Toledo
- Born: 17 July 1987 (age 39) London, England

Sport
- Country: Great Britain
- Sport: Women's rowing
- University team: Oxford University Boat Club
- Club: Leander Club
Medal record
Representing Great Britain
Olympic Games
Silver medal – second place	2016 Rio de Janeiro	W8+
European Championships
Gold medal – first place	2016 Brandenburg	W8+
Silver medal – second place	2014 Belgrade	W8+
Bronze medal – third place	2012 Varese	W8+

Zoe Michaela de Toledo (born 17 July 1987 in London) is a British rowing cox who won a silver medal at the 2016 Olympic Games in Rio de Janeiro. She coxed the eight that won the gold medal at the 2016 European Rowing Championships. She also coxed the Oxford eight in The Boat Race 2012.

== Early life ==
De Toledo was born in London and is of Jewish ancestry. She was raised in Maida Vale. de Toledo was educated at St Paul's Girls' School where she was proficient in drama and dance.

== Rowing ==
She began swimming at the age of four, but started rowing at her school's boat club in 2002 after a friend suggested that she would be a good cox due to her small height. She coxed Great Britain to a bronze medal at the 2005 World Rowing Junior Championships. Afterwards she took a one-year hiatus to retake A-level examinations, before going to Oxford Brookes University to study psychology. She was the cox at the university for one year before joining the Leander Club in 2007. In her first full season in 2008, she secured a medal in the Ladies' Challenge Plate at Henley Royal Regatta. de Toledo graduated from the university the following year.

At the 2009 World Rowing Under-23 Championships she coxed the Great Britain squad to a gold medal. It marked the first time a women's rowing team from Great Britain had won a gold medal in rowing in any age group. de Toledo returned to Oxford to study for a master's degree in psychological research at Oxford in 2010. She became involved in the university's boat club, and coxed the reserve team to victory in The Boat Race 2010.

She returned to the university to study a master's degree in criminology and criminal justice. She was selected by the university to participate in The Boat Race 2012. In the event, de Toledo was repeatedly warned by umpires for steering too closely to the rival Cambridge squad. Despite trying to move away, the boats clashed and Oxford number six Hanno Wienhausen lost his oar. This occurred just after the race was restarted following a stoppage caused by an Australian protester, Trenton Oldfield, jumping into the water purportedly to protest against elitism and inequality in British society. She trained with Team GB at Caversham Lakes after clinching a bronze medal at the European Rowing Championships.

She later went through a divorce, and was left homeless when a fire destroyed her Hambleden home in 2014. She coxed the Great Britain eight rowing squad which performed strongly in the World Rowing Championships and the World Cup Regattas. de Toledo coxed the Great Britain women's eight team to win a gold medal at 2016 European Rowing Championships and finished less than one second behind the United States in Lucerne. She helped Great Britain win their first medal in the women's eight category at the 2016 Summer Olympics in Rio de Janeiro.

Since retiring from rowing, de Toledo has taken up a place to study medicine at Oxford. In 2017, she was found to have a benign brain tumour, which was surgically resected in March 2018.
