= The Boat Race 2012 =

2012 boat race between Oxford and Cambridge universities

158th Boat Race
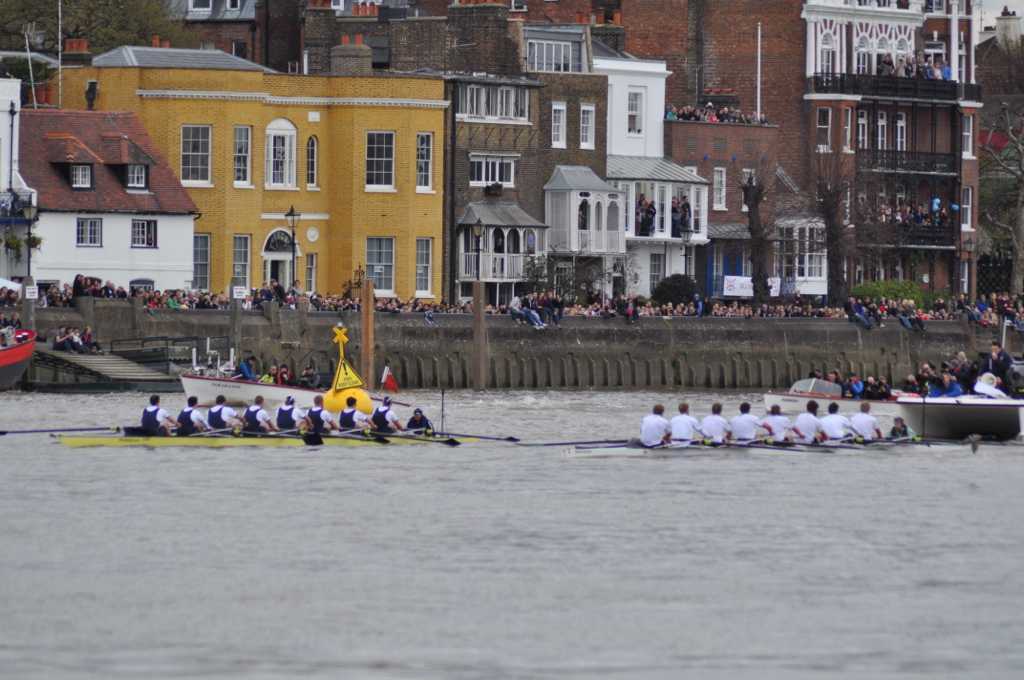
- The Oxford (left) and Cambridge (right) boats near Hammersmith Bridge during the race
- Date: 7 April 2012
- Winner: Cambridge
- Margin of victory: 4 1/4 lengths
- Winning time: 17 minutes 23 seconds
- Overall record (Cambridge–Oxford): 81–76
- Umpire: John Garrett (Cambridge)

Other races
- Reserve winner: Isis
- Women's winner: Cambridge

The 158th Boat Race took place on 7 April 2012. Held annually, The Boat Race is a side-by-side rowing race between crews from the Universities of Oxford and Cambridge along the River Thames in London. Despite Cambridge having the heavier crew, Oxford were pre-race favourites having had a successful preparation period, including a victory over Leander. Cambridge won the toss and chose to start on the Surrey side of the river. Partway through, with the boats level, the race was temporarily halted to avoid injury to protester Trenton Oldfield, who swam in front of the two crews. After the race was restarted, one of the Oxford crew suffered irreparable damage to his blade following a clash of oars with the Cambridge boat, ending Oxford's chances of victory. The race was eventually won by Cambridge by 4 1/4 lengths, in a consolidated time of 17 minutes 23 seconds.

Immediately after completing the race, a member of the Oxford crew collapsed, but later recovered. Oldfield was later jailed for six months for causing a public nuisance, and as a result of the disruption, security for subsequent Boat Races was increased. The reserve race was won by Oxford's Isis in a record time, while the Women's Boat Race was won by Cambridge.

== Background ==
The Boat Race is a side-by-side rowing competition between the University of Oxford (sometimes referred to as the "Dark Blues") and the University of Cambridge (sometimes referred to as the "Light Blues"). The race was first held in 1829, and since 1845 has taken place on the 4.2-mile (6.8 km) Championship Course on the River Thames in southwest London. The rivalry is a major point of honour between the two universities, followed throughout the United Kingdom and broadcast worldwide. Oxford went into the 2012 race as reigning champions, having beaten Cambridge by four lengths in the previous year's race. However, Cambridge held the overall lead, with 80 victories to Oxford's 76 (excluding the "dead heat" of 1877). Oxford were pre-race favourites, having beaten Leander, Molesey Boat Club and a German national under-23 crew in the previous weeks.

The first Women's Boat Race took place in 1927, but did not become an annual fixture until the 1960s. Until 2014, the contest was conducted as part of the Henley Boat Races, but as of the 2015 race, it is held on the River Thames Tideway, on the same day as the men's main and reserve races. The reserve race, contested between Oxford's Isis boat and Cambridge's Goldie boat, has been held since 1965. It usually takes place on the Thames, prior to the main Boat Race.

== Crews ==
The trial crews competed against one another on 13 December 2011 on The Championship Course. Oxford's boats were titled Hell and High Water, while Cambridge's two crews rowed in Cloak and Dagger. Hell and Dagger won their respective races. The official crews were announced at the weigh-in, held on 5 March 2012 at a venue nearby the London 2012 Olympic Stadium. For the first time in Cambridge's Boat Race history, their boat featured just one British oarsman, Mike Thorp, who, along with stroke David Nelson and Oxford's number five Karl Hudspith, were the only participants who had featured in the 2011 race. The remainder of the Cambridge crew comprised three Americans, two Australians, a German, a New Zealander and cox Ed Bosson, another Briton. The Oxford crew consisted of a British cox, four British oarsmen, two Americans, a German and a Dutch rower.

The Cambridge oarsmen weighed an average of 7.9 kilograms (17 lb) more than their Oxford counterparts, with Cambridge's cox Ed Bosson outweighing Oxford's Zoe de Toledo by 6 kilograms (13 lb). Despite the fact that heavier Oxbridge crews were traditionally more successful, Oxford boat club president Hudspith, himself part of the successful 2011 Dark Blue crew which defeated a heavier Cambridge crew, downplayed the disparity, "It's a big difference but it's a very long race and you have to have the power to carry that weight down the course".

Seat	Cambridge				Oxford			
Seat	Name	College	Nationality	Weight	Name	College	Nationality	Weight
Bow	Moritz Schramm	Fitzwilliam	German	91.8 kg (202 lb)	Alex Woods	Pembroke	British	77.8 kg (172 lb)
2	Jack Lindeman	Hughes Hall	American	94.6 kg (209 lb)	William Zeng	Oriel	American	82.4 kg (182 lb)
3	Mike Thorp	Homerton	British	91.8 kg (202 lb)	Kevin Baum	Trinity	American	91.6 kg (202 lb)
4	David Nelson (P)	Hughes Hall	Australian	92.8 kg (205 lb)	Hanno Wienhausen	Christ Church	German	93.6 kg (206 lb)
5	Alexander Scharp	St. Edmund's	American	95.6 kg (211 lb)	Karl Hudspith (P)	St. Peter's	British	92.8 kg (205 lb)
6	Steve Dudek	St. Edmund's	American	109.6 kg (242 lb)	Alex Davidson	Christ Church	British	94.6 kg (209 lb)
7	Alex Ross	Caius	New Zealand	102.0 kg (225 lb)	Dan Harvey	Mansfield	British	79.6 kg (175 lb)
Stroke	Niles Garratt	Hughes Hall	American	92.2 kg (203 lb)	Roel Haen	Oriel	Dutch	96.8 kg (213 lb)
Cox	Ed Bosson	Pembroke	British	55.6 kg (123 lb)	Zoe de Toledo	St. Catherine's	British	49.6 kg (109 lb)
(P) – Boat club president Source:

== Races ==
The Championship Course along which the Boat Race is contested

=== Women's and reserves ===
The women's race, the 66th meeting of Cambridge University Women's Boat Club and Oxford University Women's Boat Club, was held at the Henley Boat Races on 25 March. In a close race, Cambridge won by a quarter of a length, in a time of 6 minutes, 38 seconds. Oxford's Osiris won the women's reserve race against Cambridge's Blondie.

The reserve race, between Oxford's Isis and Cambridge's Goldie, was held thirty minutes before the main race, at 1:45 p.m. Goldie won the toss and elected to start on the Surrey station. Despite rating higher and taking an early lead, Goldie was caught by Isis between Fulham Football Club and Hammersmith Bridge at Barn Elms. Oxford's reserve boat held a half-length lead by the Mile Post, and extended their lead to over a length by Hammersmith Bridge. Isis continued to pull away and completed the race in a record time of 16 minutes 41 seconds, beating the previous best by seven seconds, five lengths ahead of Cambridge.

=== Main race ===
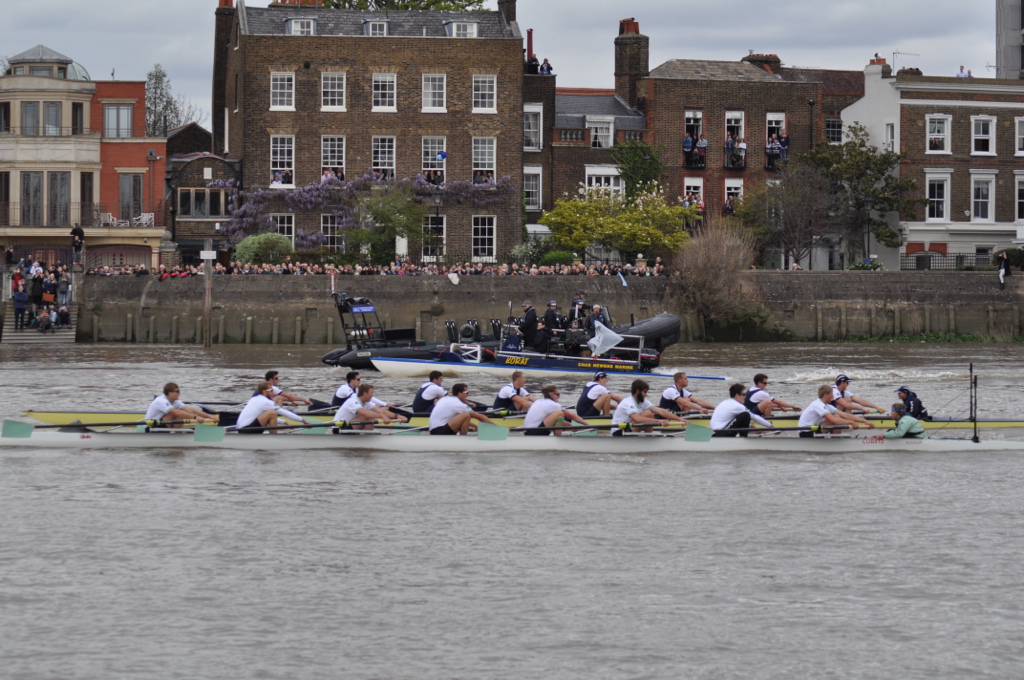
The Cambridge (foreground) and Oxford (background) crews were level near Hammersmith Bridge.

The race, sponsored by Xchanging, commenced at 2:15 p.m., with conditions overcast and a light rain, and a light wind. The umpire for the race was John Garrett, who had rowed for the Light Blues three times in the 1980s. Cambridge won the toss and chose the Surrey station, leaving Oxford with the longer outside bend from the Middlesex station. The crews were level at Fulham Football Club and Hammersmith Bridge but on the approach to Chiswick Pier, assistant umpire Matthew Pinsent spotted a person in the water and alerted umpire John Garrett, who stopped the race. Trenton Oldfield, a protester against class elitism, had swum in front of the boats as they headed into the final bend, and narrowly avoided being struck. A representative of the Metropolitan Police noted: "They almost took his head off". It was the first time the race had been stopped since 2001, and only the second time in the history of the event. Oldfield was pulled from the water onto the umpire's boat, handcuffed and arrested.

The race was restarted some thirty minutes later, after Garrett had been satisfied that both crews were located as close as possible to where the disruption took place, in rough water caused by the flotilla following the race. Within a minute of the restart, the crews drifted together with Oxford being warned by Garrett, causing a clash of oars which resulted in Oxford's number six, Hanno Wienhausen, breaking the shaft of his blade in half. Broadcast footage of the event showed the Oxford cox, Zoe de Toledo, waving her hand and shouting to the umpire as she believed the damage had been sustained within the first 100 metres and therefore that the race should be stopped; as the Boat Race is not run under World Rowing Federation rules this appeal was swiftly rejected by Garrett, effectively ending the race as a contest. Cambridge rowed away from Oxford to win by 4 1/4 lengths with a consolidated winning time of 17 minutes 23 seconds.

== Reaction ==
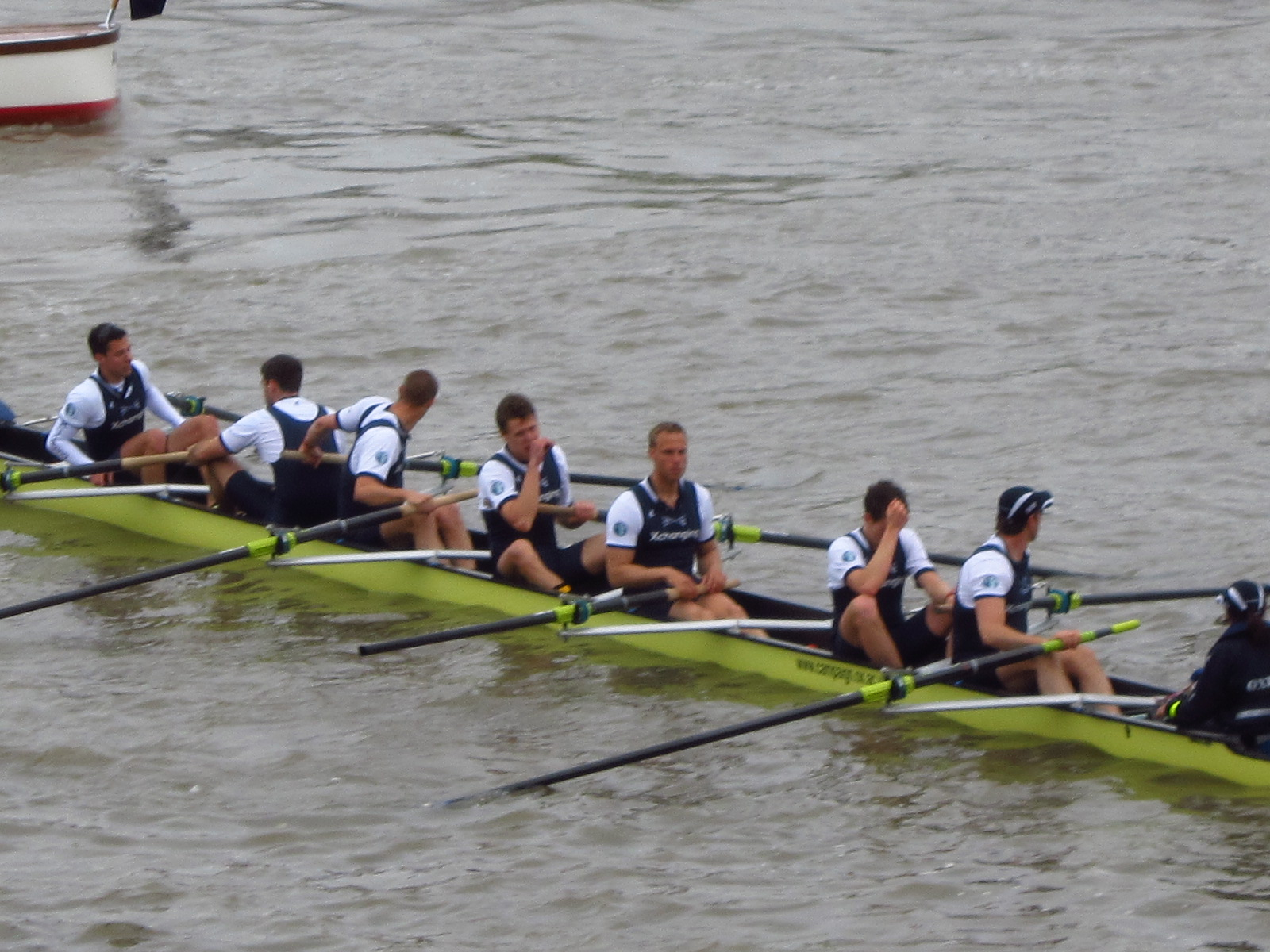
Oxford crew after the conclusion of the race with the number six's broken blade visible.

=== Post-race ===
Immediately after the race, de Toledo signaled the umpire and entered into a heated discussion wherein she made a request that the race be re-rowed as a result of the clash of oars and damage Oxford had sustained. This final appeal was again rejected by Garrett who raised the white flag to signify that he considered the matter moot. In an official statement after the race, he said "there was nothing in the appeal to alter the material consideration that Cambridge were correctly on their station at the time of the contact, and that Oxford had therefore been responsible for the foul".

Largely unnoticed while the appeal was occurring, Oxford's bow man, Alex Woods, had collapsed and lost consciousness. After being pulled into a launch and having treatment administered on the bank of the river, he was taken to Charing Cross Hospital, where he made a complete recovery. Oxford's coach Sean Bowden suggested that the loss of one of Oxford's blades had driven Woods to push himself "beyond his limits". As a result of the disruption and the concern for Woods' condition, the traditional award ceremony was cancelled. Woods later apologised to the Cambridge crew and coach for his collapse that "prevented their celebrations" while thanking them for their "sportsmanlike behaviour". Cambridge boat club president Nelson said "I feel bad. Finishing the race there was a lot of raw emotion and some of the celebrations seem pathetic in retrospect" while his coach Steve Trapmore commented "it's not the way anyone wants to take away the win".

The Observer described the race as "one of the most bizarre and dramatic in the competition's history", while The Daily Telegraph suggested the event had been "ruined" and described Cambridge's victory as "hollow". British Olympic Association chairman and former Blue Colin Moynihan claimed that the race was " effectively destroyed ... by the actions of a crazy guy who was hugely putting his life at risk".

=== Trenton Oldfield ===
Oldfield, an Australian national, said he was making "a protest against inequalities in British society, government cuts, reductions in civil liberties and a culture of elitism". Oxford number two, William Zeng, denounced Oldfield and described him as "a mockery of a man", while Oxford boat club president Karl Hudspith tweeted "my team went through seven months of hell, this was the culmination of our careers and [Oldfield] took it from us". Educated at the Sydney Church of England Grammar School, the University of Sydney and the London School of Economics, and Fellow of the Royal Society of Arts, Oldfield tweeted the day after the race, "Having been deep within elite institutions I have a very good understanding of them. I protest their injustices – ask anyone that knows me". On his blog, Oldfield compared his actions to those of Emily Davison, the suffragette killed after stepping in front of the King's horse at The Derby in 1913. Despite later stating he had some sympathy for both the rowers and spectators, he said he had no regrets and that he "would have felt less of a man" had he not made the protest. In October 2012, Oldfield was jailed for six months for causing a public nuisance and ordered to pay £750 costs. In June 2013, he was refused leave to remain in the United Kingdom, the Home Office claiming his presence there was not "conducive to the public good". Oldfield, whose wife is from India, appealed on the grounds that she would be threatened in Australia, and in December 2013, the deportation order was overturned. Security for the 2013 race was increased as a result of Oldfield's actions, with Royal Marines, additional stewards and the Metropolitan Police Marine Policing Unit in attendance.
