= The Boat Race 2000 =

146th Boat Race
- Date: 25 March 2000
- Winner: Oxford
- Margin of victory: 3 lengths
- Winning time: 18 minutes 4 seconds
- Overall record (Cambridge–Oxford): 76–69
- Umpire: Simon Harris (Cambridge)

Other races
- Reserve winner: Goldie
- Women's winner: Oxford

The 146th Boat Race took place on 25 March 2000. Oxford won the race by three lengths, breaking a seven-year spell of Cambridge dominance. The result was a "shock triumph". The race also featured the joint-tallest ever competitor, and the youngest ever winner in the "modern" race. In the reserve race, Isis beat Goldie by five lengths, and Oxford triumphed in the women's race, emerging with victory in the men's and women's races for the year.

== Background ==
The Boat Race is an annual competition between the universities of Oxford and Cambridge. First held in 1829, the competition is a 4.2-mile (6.8 km) race along the River Thames in southwest London. The rivalry is a major point of honour between the two universities and followed throughout the United Kingdom and worldwide. Cambridge went into the race as reigning champions, having won the 1999 race by 3 1/2 lengths. Cambridge had won the last seven races (between 1993 and 1999); and led overall with 76 victories to Oxford's 68 (excluding the "dead heat to Oxford by five feet" of 1877). The race was sponsored by Aberdeen Asset Management.

The first Women's Boat Race took place in 1927, but did not become an annual fixture until the 1960s. Up until 2014, the contest was conducted as part of the Henley Boat Races, but as of the 2015 race, it is held on the River Thames, on the same day as the men's main and reserve races. The reserve race, contested between Oxford's Isis boat and Cambridge's Goldie boat has been held since 1965. It usually takes place on the Tideway, prior to the main Boat Race.

== Crews ==
The Oxford crew (sometimes referred to as the "Dark Blues") had a heavier average weight of 13 stone 10 pounds (87 kg) per crew member, making them almost 11 pounds (5.0 kg) heavier per man; and were considered the underdogs before the race. The Cambridge crew (sometimes referred to as the "Light Blues") had a taller crew, and had the joint-tallest ever competitor, the 6 feet 10 inches (2.08 m) Joshua West. The Oxford crew had an average age of 21 while Cambridge's crew averaged 23. The Oxford crew featured six Britons, two Americans, and a Norwegian; whilst the Cambridge crew consisted of six Britons, an American, a New Zealander, and a South African.

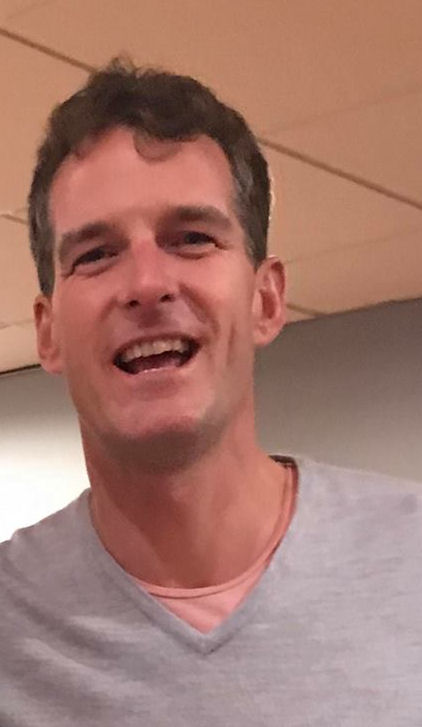
Dan Snow (pictured in 2019) rowed at number 5 for Oxford.

Seat	Oxford				Cambridge			
Seat	Name	Nationality	Age	College	Name	Nationality	Age	College
Bow	Andrew G.G. Dunn	British	19	Lincoln	Ronan P. Cantwell	British	20	Peterhouse
2	Nick J. Robinson	British	21	Lincoln	John O'Loghlen	New Zealander	26	Emmanuel
3	Ben J. Burch	British	20	Pembroke	Richard A. Ehlers	South African	25	St John's
4	Matt J. Smith	British	18	St Catherine's	Howard N.F. Martin	British	27	Trinity
5	Dan Snow	British	21	Balliol	Josh West	American	22	Gonville and Caius
6	Toby H. Ayer	American	24	Worcester	Tom Stallard	British	21	Jesus
7	Eirik B. Lilledahl	Norwegian	25	Nuffield	Daniel J. Tweddie	British	22	Trinity Hall
Stroke	Alex Reid	American	23	Lincoln	Richard P. Stokes	British	21	Trinity
Cox	Kajsa McLaren	British	19	Pembroke	Gideon J. Glassman	British	22	Trinity Hall

== Race description ==
Cambridge won the coin toss and chose to start from the southern side, the Surrey side, of the River Thames, based on the opinion that taking a lead early in the race would give them an advantage. However, the theory failed as Oxford stayed with Cambridge, and though Cambridge had a large push which gave them a slender lead after two minutes, Oxford were leading at the First Mile post, passing in 3 minutes 41 seconds, Cambridge a second behind. The race was close, and "the lead switched back and forth between the two teams". Cambridge pressed and rewon their lead, and were a quarter of a length ahead after a favourable bend. Though level at Chiswick Steps, Oxford pushed ahead, gaining a five-second lead by Barnes Bridge, and eight at the finish.

Oxford finished with a time of 18 minutes, 4 seconds, Cambridge finished 8 seconds behind. It was Oxford's first victory in seven years and brought the overall result to 76–69 in Cambridge's favour. The victory gave the Oxford number four, Matthew Smith, the honour of being the youngest ever "modern" winner at 18 years, 8 months 11 days. In the reserve race, Oxford's Isis beat Cambridge's Goldie by five lengths. Earlier, Oxford won the 55th women's race by 2 1/4 lengths, in a time of 6 minutes 18 seconds, their first victory in nine years. Oxford also won the women's lightweight, but Cambridge won the women's reserves, men's lightweight, and men's lightweight reserves.

== Reaction ==
Oxford University Boat Club President and number two Nick Robinson said the crew had kept going and won "an incredible race", but was a "shock triumph".
