= The Boat Races 2015 =

Annual race between Oxford and Cambridge universities

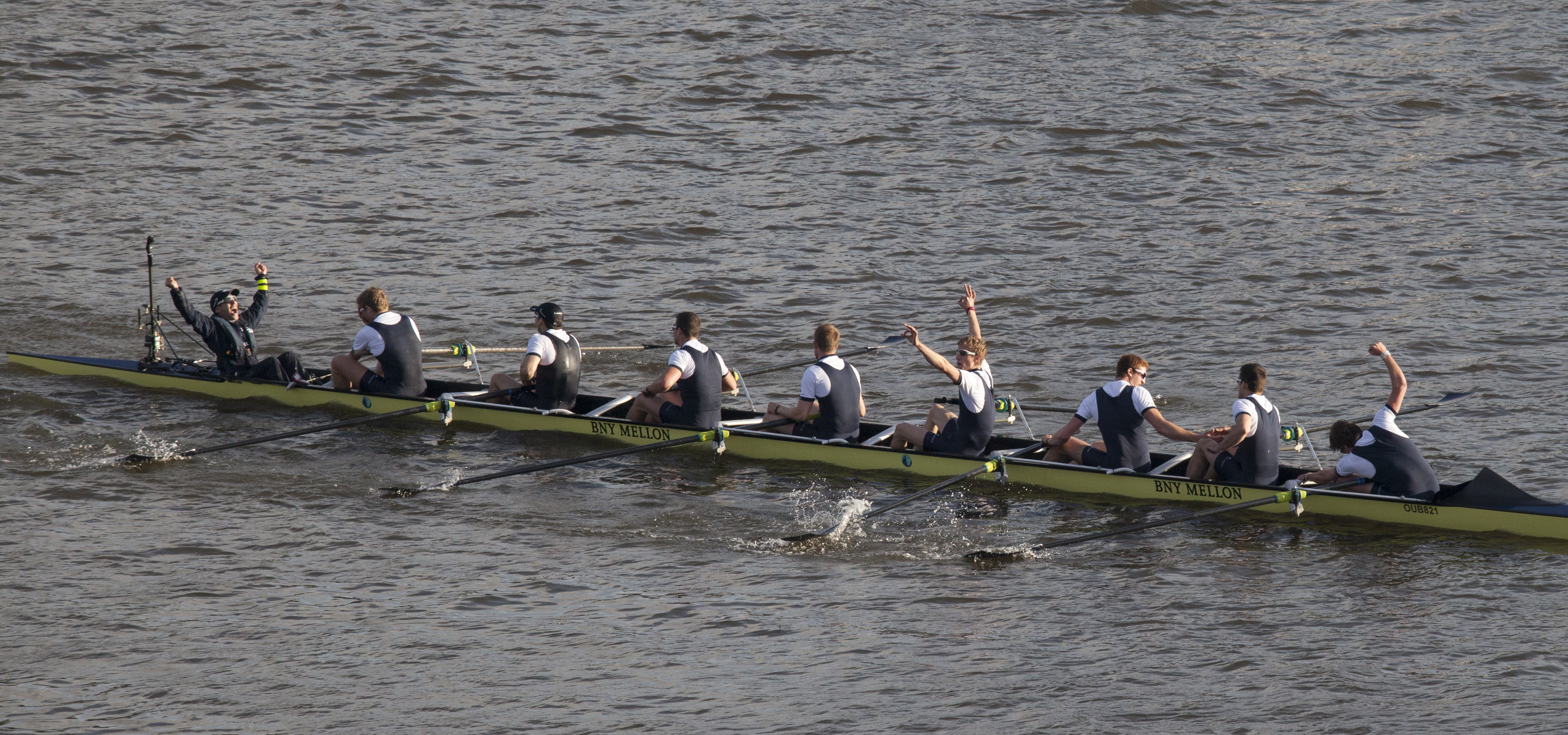
- Oxford Men's VIII celebrating victory
- Date: 11 April 2015

Men's race
- Winner: Oxford
- Margin of victory: 6 1/2 lengths
- Winning time: 17 minutes 34 seconds
- Overall record (Cambridge–Oxford): 81–79
- Umpire: Boris Rankov (Oxford)

Women's race
- Winner: Oxford
- Margin of victory: 6 1/2 lengths
- Winning time: 19 minutes 45 seconds
- Overall record (Cambridge–Oxford): 41–29
- Umpire: Simon Harris (Cambridge)

Reserves' races
- Men's winners: Isis
- Women's winners: Osiris

The 2015 Boat Races took place on 11 April 2015. Held annually, The Boat Race is a side-by-side rowing race between crews from the Universities of Oxford and Cambridge along a 4.2-mile (6.8 km) tidal stretch of the River Thames in south-west London. For the first time in the history of the event, the men's, women's and both reserves' races were all held on the Tideway; in the men's reserve race, Cambridge's Goldie faced Oxford's Isis after the women's race, as a preliminary to the main men's race, while the women's reserve race, held the day before, saw Oxford's Osiris race against Cambridge's Blondie.

Oxford's women won the first running of the Women's Boat Race on the Tideway, and the 70th overall, by six and a half lengths, to take the overall record in the event to 41–29 in Cambridge's favour. Oxford also won the men's reserve race, with Isis winning by three lengths. In the main men's race, umpired by the six-time Blue Boris Rankov, Oxford won by six and a half lengths in a time of 17 minutes 34 seconds, taking the overall record in the event to 81–79 in Cambridge's favour. The women's reserve race was won by Oxford's Osiris by fifteen lengths, making the overall record 21–20 in Cambridge's favour.

== Background ==
The Championship Course along which, for the first time in the history of the event, the men's, women's and reserves' races were conducted.

The Boat Race, sometimes called the University Boat Race, is a side-by-side rowing competition between the University of Oxford (sometimes referred to as the "Dark Blues") and the University of Cambridge (sometimes referred to as the "Light Blues"). First held in 1829, the race takes place on the 4.2-mile (6.8 km) Championship Course, between Putney and Mortlake on the River Thames in south-west London. The rivalry is a major point of honour between the two universities; it is followed throughout the United Kingdom and broadcast worldwide. Oxford went into the race as champions, having won the 2014 race by a margin of eleven lengths, but Cambridge led overall with 81 victories to Oxford's 78 (excluding the "dead heat to Oxford by five feet" of 1877).

It was the first time in the history of The Boat Race that the three main races, the men's, women's and men's reserves', were held on the same day and on the same course along the Tideway. Prior to this year, the women's race which first took place in 1927, was usually held at the Henley Boat Races along the 2,000-metre (2,200 yd) course. However, on at least two occasions in the interwar period, the women competed on the Thames between Chiswick and Kew. Oxford went into the race as reigning champions, having won the 2014 race by four lengths, with Cambridge leading 41–28 overall. For the third year, the men's race was sponsored by BNY Mellon while the women's race saw BNY Mellon's subsidiary Newton Investment Management as sponsors. It was part of the sponsorship deal with Newton Investment Management that mandated the women's race to be rowed on the same course and with the same funding as the men's race. According to their chief executive, Helena Morrissey, the company "didn't just want a name on a shirt; [it] wanted to do something meaningful". The women's race was scheduled to take place at 4:50 pm, the men's reserves' race half an hour later and the men's race a further half-hour after that at 5:50 pm. The women's reserve race between Cambridge's Blondie and Oxford's Osiris took place on the Tideway for the first time, one day before the main races, at 4:05 pm.

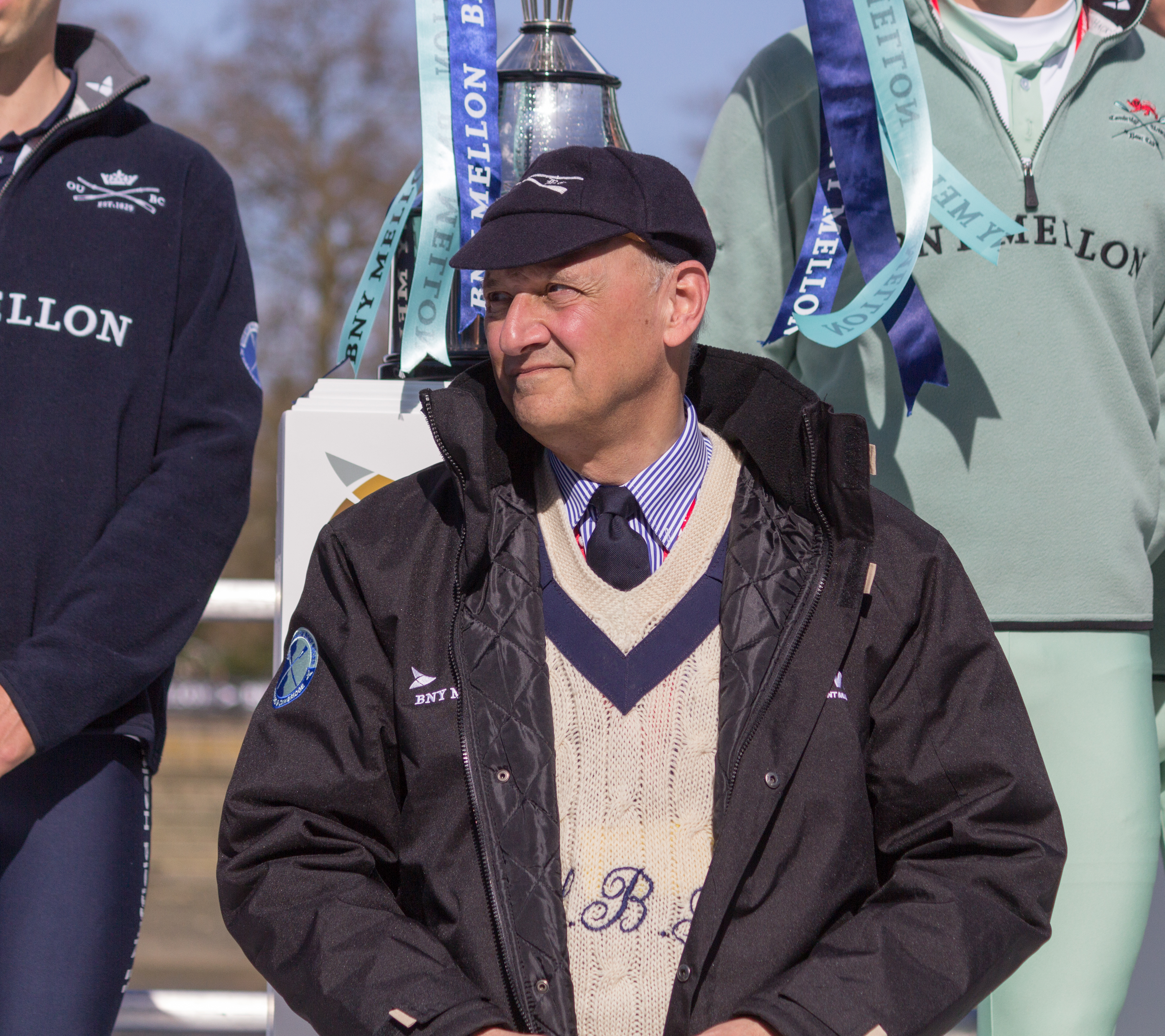
Boris Rankov, umpire of the men's race

The television historian and former Oxford rower Dan Snow (who represented the Dark Blues in the 1999, 2000 and 2001 races) said: "Most televised sport is a carnival of misogyny so it is great news that the Boat Race is leading the way in ensuring that women take their rightful place alongside men." The BBC sports broadcaster Eleanor Oldroyd suggested that scheduling the races on the same course and day was "a game-changing move" for female sport, and "now they've achieved equality – same course, same distance, same prize money [sic], same BBC TV coverage, to an expected global audience of 100 million". The television presenter Clare Balding opted to cover the women's race instead of the 2015 Grand National, claiming that the combined rowing event would have a "ripple effect all across society, business and sport".

The autumn reception was held at the London headquarters of BNY Mellon. As Oxford had won the previous year's race, it was Cambridge's responsibility to offer the traditional challenge to the Dark Blues. To that end, Alexander Leichter and Caroline Reid, presidents of the Cambridge boat clubs, challenged Constantine Louloudis and Anastasia Chitty, their counterparts, who duly accepted. Umpires for the senior races were announced on 4 March: the former Cambridge rower Simon Harris, who represented the Light Blues in the 1982 and 1983 races oversaw the Women's race, while the six-time Oxford Blue Boris Rankov umpired the men's race for the fourth time. Rob Clegg, the umpire of the 2011 race oversaw the men's reserve race while the Olympic bronze medallist Sarah Winckless umpired the women's reserve race.

== Coaches ==
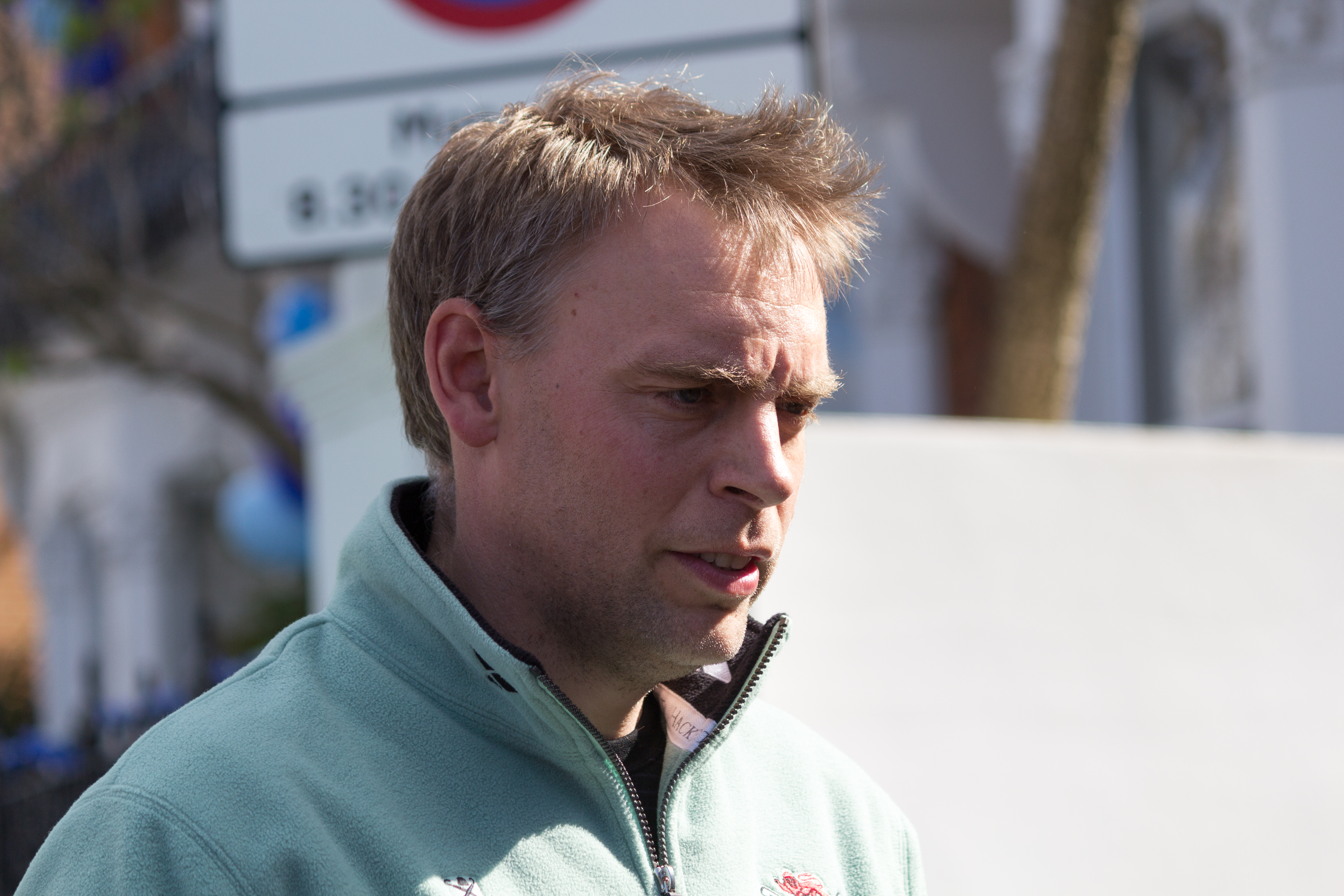
Cambridge men's coach Steve Trapmore

The Cambridge men's crew coaching team was led by their Chief Coach Steve Trapmore. Appointed to the post in 2010, Trapmore was a gold medal-winning member of the men's eight at the 2000 Summer Olympics. He was assisted by Ed Green, the former head coach at University College Cork and development coach at Molesey Boat Club. Green's primary responsibility will be to coach Goldie. Mark Beer, former Cambridge University Boat Club assistant coach, was appointed as the development coach for the Light Blues. Sean Bowden returned as Chief Coach for Oxford, having been responsible for the senior men's crew since 1997. He was a former Great Britain Olympic coach and coached the Light Blues in the 1993 and 1994 Boat Races. His assistant coach was Andy Nelder who has coached the senior boat since 2006.

Oxford's women's Head Coach was the Canadian Christine Wilson who had previously assisted in coaching the United States Olympic team and held the position of Head Coach of women's rowing at Yale University. She was assisted by Natasha Townsend who had represented Great Britain in the women's eights at two Olympics. Cambridge were coached by the former Goldie coach Rob Baker who was assisted by Paddy Ryan and Nick Acock, along with two guest coaches in Jonathan Condor and Annie Vernon; Ed Hallam was their strength and conditioning coach.

== Trials ==
=== Women's trials ===
The trials took place on The Championship Course on 9 December 2014, in each case being the first and only time the crews would have to practice the route while racing side-by-side. Both races were umpired by Simon Harris in windy conditions.

Oxford University Women's Boat Club's (OUWBC) trial eights, Real Life and Fantasy, set off at 1:15 p.m. Real Life, starting from the Middlesex station, made a better start and were three seats ahead at the Town Buoy before holding a length's lead after the first bend. Following a warning from Harris as the crews approached Hammersmith Bridge, the lead was reduced to half-a-length around the Surrey bend. Fantasy allowed Real Life to take a clear water advantage by the Bandstand, and they pulled away at Barnes Bridge to win by three lengths. The Oxford coach Christine Wilson noted that "today the crews pushed each other to know the course and to take risks when a racing opportunity presents itself".

The two boats in the Cambridge University Women's Boat Club (CUWBC) trials were denoted as Rise and Grind, with the race commencing at 2:30 p.m. Starting from the Surrey station, Rise, despite the lower stroke rate, were half a length ahead within the first 20 strokes, and held a length's lead by Craven Cottage. They gradually extended their lead to two lengths by Hammersmith Bridge, three by Chiswick Steps and finished five lengths ahead of Grind. Cambridge's coach Rob Baker was mildly disappointed but remained upbeat, suggesting "Though I would have liked a closer race, I saw some excellent performances".

=== Men's trials ===
The men's trials took place along The Championship Course on 11 December 2014, and according to the author Chris Dodd, were held in conditions "perfect ... for coaches in the process of testing their men and trying to seat people in the right order". Both races were umpired by Boris Rankov, the former Oxford Blue who rowed for the Dark Blues on a record six occasions.

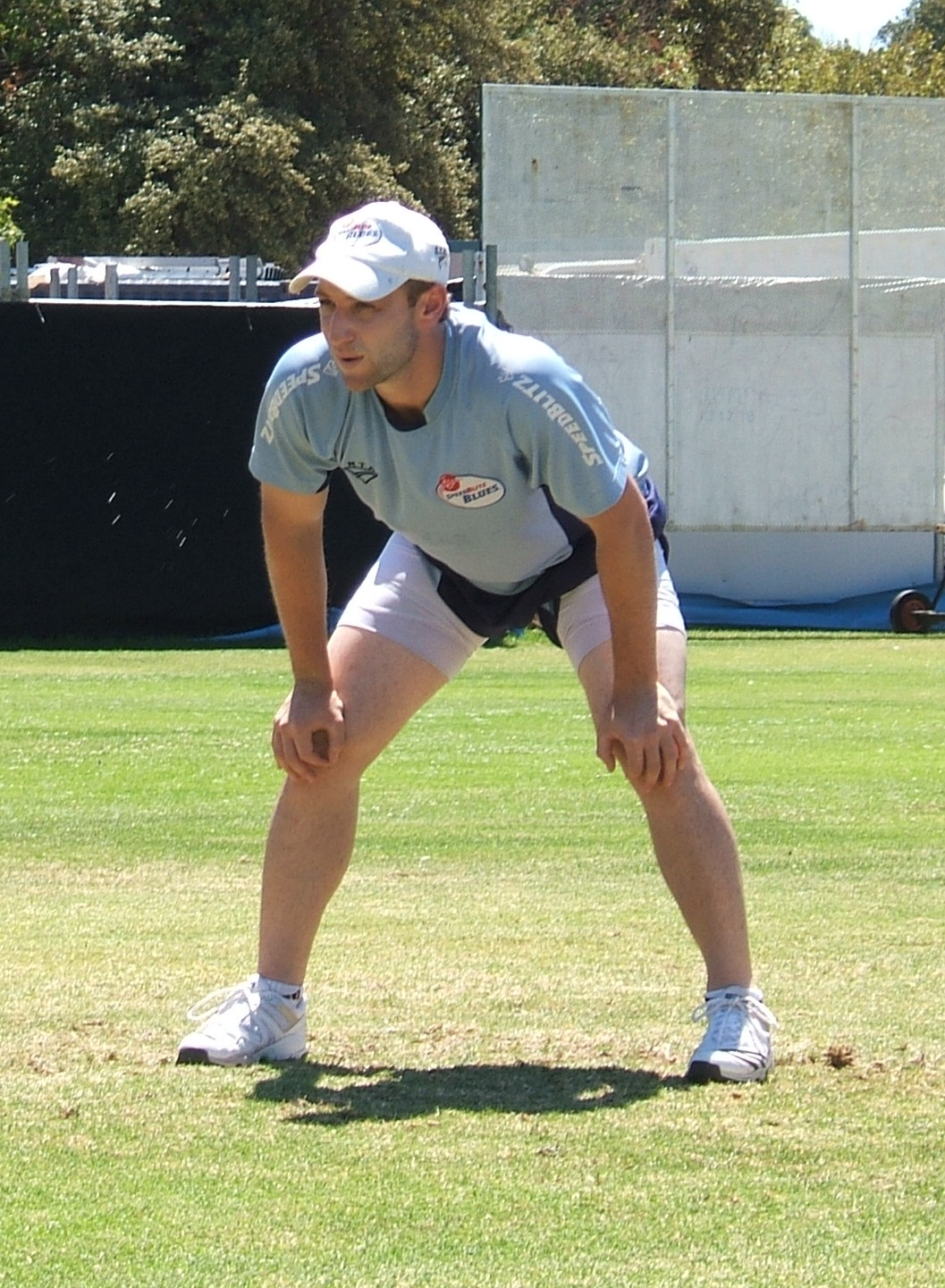
Cambridge's trial boats were named 63 and Not Out to commemorate Phillip Hughes' final unfinished innings.

Cambridge's senior men's trial boats were called 63 and Not Out in honour of the Australian Test cricketer Phillip Hughes who had died earlier in the year after being struck in the neck by a bouncer during a domestic match. Not Out made the better start but lost their canvas-length lead by Barn Elms, and the crews passed the Mile Post level. Shooting Hammersmith Bridge, 63 were half a length down, and a length-and-a-half down by Chiswick Steps. Not Out held a two-length lead by the time the crews passed under Barnes Bridge which they extended to two-and-three-quarters by the finishing post. Dodd described the race as "epic", while senior coach Trapmore expressed his contentment with the trial suggesting "it is an invaluable exercise."

The Oxford trial saw Per Terram line up against Per Mare, so named to commemorate the 350th anniversary of the foundation of the Royal Marines whose motto is "Per Mare, Per Terram" ("By sea, by land"). Per Terram, stroked by the Oxford University Boat Club president Louloudis, took an early lead and were half-a-length ahead before Per Mare recovered the deficit to be level by Barn Elms. A spurt from Per Terram at the Mile Post saw them regain the lead but at Harrods Furniture Depository, Per Mare took the lead back, shooting Hammersmith Bridge precisely and holding a three-quarter length lead by St Paul's School. Both crews experienced fierce winds with Per Terram coping better and taking a half-length advantage. Per Mare kept in touch through to Barnes Bridge but Per Terram pushed on and passed the finishing post with a winning margin of two lengths. Oxford's coach Bowden was cautious, stating that the "trial shows that Oxford is in good shape, but this race is not the only bit of the trials process". Dodd described the race as "cracking".

== Build-up ==
=== Women's ===
On 25 January 2015, a CUWBC crew raced against a crew from Newcastle University Boat Club along three sections of the Championship Course. Cambridge won all three races with relative ease, and their boat club president Reid, rowing at number four, reflected that it had been "a useful experience". Cambridge raced against an Imperial College Boat Club crew on 8 March over two sections of the Tideway course, first between the start and Hammersmith Bridge, before racing between the Mile Post and Chiswick Steps. The first leg was declared to be too close to call by the umpire Simon Harris, while the second ended in a two-thirds length victory to the Light Blues. OUWBC raced against Molesey Boat Club on 21 February 2015, in three stages on the Tideway, and comfortably won each race. This was followed by a race against Imperial College Boat Club on 22 March over three sections of the Thames. Imperial were waterlogged in the first piece, but Oxford easily won the second and third races.

OUWBC were rescued by the Royal National Lifeboat Institution (RNLI) on the Thames on 1 April 2015 after becoming waterlogged in rough conditions. They were inadvertently discovered stranded during an RNLI exercise. Prior to race day, Rachel Quarrell, the former Oxford cox (who steered OUWBC in the 1991 race) writing in The Daily Telegraph noted that "since the start of this season the Oxford women have been notably faster".

=== Men's ===
On 16 March 2015, CUBC raced in two pieces along the Tideway against a Leander Club crew steered by Oxford's 2012 race cox Zoe De Toledo. Cambridge won the first race, from the Boat Race start to the top of Chiswick Eyot, by two and a half lengths, and the second, between the Eyot and Mortlake by four lengths. OUBC faced a crew from Molesey Boat Club in three races along the Tideway five days later. Despite Imperial being given a head start in two of the three races, Oxford won all three pieces relatively easily. The same day, Cambridge faced a Netherlands Eight in two races on the Thames. The Light Blues easily won the first race, but finished the second level against "experienced and accomplished opposition".

== Crews ==
The official weigh-in for both women's and men's crews took place at the Royal Academy of Arts on 19 March 2015, hosted by Clare Balding.

=== Women's ===
The Cambridge crew weighed an average of 11 st 6 lb 2 oz (72.5 kg), 2 pounds (0.9 kg) per rower more than their opponents. Oxford saw four rowers with Boat Race experience return, including bow Maxie Sheske and Anastasia Chitty who was making her third appearances in the event. Cambridge's crew included three former Blues in Caroline Reid, Claire Watkins and Melissa Wilson (who was also making her third appearance in the event). Oxford's stroke, the American Caryn Davies, was a three-time Olympic medallist, having taken silver in the women's coxed eights at the 2004 Summer Olympics and gold at both the 2008 and 2012 Summer Olympics. Cambridge's cox Rosemary Ostfeld steered Goldie the previous year. Over the Easter weekend, Oxford switched their number five and seven, moving Nadine Graedel Iberg behind stroke. Cambridge swapped bow for stroke, switching Hannah Evans for Fanny Belais.

Seat	Oxford					Cambridge				
Seat	Name	Nationality	College	Height	Weight	Name	Nationality	College	Height	Weight
Bow	Maxie Scheske	British	Magdalen	5 ft 8 in (1.73 m)	10 st 6 lb 13 oz (66.6 kg)	Fanny Belais	Swiss/French	King's	5 ft 5 in (1.65 m)	9 st 8 lb 1 oz (60.8 kg)
2	Anastasia Chitty (P)	British	Pembroke	5 ft 9 in (1.75 m)	10 st 13 lb 7 oz (69.6 kg)	Ashton Brown	Canadian	Fitzwilliam	5 ft 9 in (1.75 m)	12 st 10 lb 2 oz (80.8 kg)
3	Shelley Pearson	Bermudian/British	St Cross	5 ft 9 in (1.75 m)	11 st 0 lb 5 oz (70.0 kg)	Caroline Reid (P)	British	Jesus	5 ft 10 in (1.78 m)	10 st 5 lb 8 oz (66.0 kg)
4	Lauren Kedar	British	Exeter	5 ft 10 in (1.78 m)	11 st 12 lb 4 oz (75.4 kg)	Claire Watkins	British	Clare	5 ft 9 in (1.75 m)	11 st 3 lb 0 oz (71.2 kg)
5	Maddy Badcott	British	Wadham	5 ft 10 in (1.78 m)	11 st 9 lb 2 oz (74.0 kg)	Melissa Wilson	British	Gonville and Caius	5 ft 9 in (1.75 m)	12 st 3 lb 8 oz (77.8 kg)
6	Emily Reynolds	American	Trinity	5 ft 10 in (1.78 m)	10 st 8 lb 9 oz (67.4 kg)	Holly Hill	British	Downing	6 ft 0 in (1.83 m)	12 st 5 lb 12 oz (78.8 kg)
7	Nadine Graedel Iberg	Swiss	Lincoln	5 ft 9 in (1.75 m)	11 st 5 lb 10 oz (72.4 kg)	Daphne Martschenko	American	Homerton	5 ft 10 in (1.78 m)	12 st 0 lb 7 oz (76.4 kg)
Stroke	Caryn Davies	American	Balliol	6 ft 3 in (1.91 m)	12 st 4 lb 13 oz (78.4 kg)	Hannah Evans	British	Selwyn	5 ft 7 in (1.70 m)	10 st 12 lb 9 oz (69.2 kg)
Cox	Jennifer Ehr	British/American	Pembroke	5 ft 6 in (1.68 m)	7 st 13 lb 2 oz (50.4 kg)	Rosemary Ostfeld	American	Hughes Hall	5 ft 2 in (1.57 m)	7 st 11 lb 13 oz (49.8 kg)
Sources: (P) – Boat club president

=== Men's ===
The Cambridge crew weighed an average of 14 st 4 lb 11 oz (90.8 kg), 11.5 pounds (5.2 kg) per rower more than their opponents. Oxford saw four rowers with Boat Race experience return, including number seven Sam O'Connor and stroke Louloudis who made their third consecutive appearances in the event. Louloudis was an Olympic bronze medallist, having stroked Great Britain to third place in the men's eight at the 2012 Summer Olympics. The New Zealand brothers Sam and James O'Connor were the first siblings to row in the event since the Winklevoss twins (Cameron and Tyler) represented Oxford in the 2010 race. Cambridge's crew contained five Blues who participated in the 2014 race, including their cox Ian Middleton. During "Tideway week", James Mountain replaced James O'Connor, the latter suffering from illness. On O'Connor's return to the boat, he was switched with Thomas Swartz at number two.

Seat	Oxford					Cambridge				
Seat	Name	Nationality	College	Height	Weight	Name	Nationality	College	Height	Weight
Bow	William Geffen	British	Keble	6 ft 1 in (1.85 m)	12 st 13 lb 4 oz (82.0 kg)	Jasper Holst	Dutch	Hughes Hall	6 ft 6 in (1.98 m)	13 st 9 lb 6 oz (86.8 kg)
2	James O'Connor	New Zealander	Lady Margaret Hall	6 ft 2 in (1.88 m)	13 st 1 lb 14 oz (83.4 kg)	Luke Juckett	American	St Edmund's	6 ft 1 in (1.85 m)	13 st 5 lb 13 oz (85.2 kg)
3	Henry Goodier	British	Oriel	6 ft 6 in (1.98 m)	13 st 12 lb 7 oz (88.2 kg)	Joshua Hooper	Australian	St Edmund's	6 ft 4 in (1.93 m)	14 st 8 lb 2 oz (92.6 kg)
4	Thomas Swartz	American/Canadian	Keble	6 ft 2 in (1.88 m)	12 st 0 lb 14 oz (76.6 kg)	Alexander Leichter (P)	Austrian	St Edmund's	6 ft 4 in (1.93 m)	15 st 8 lb 15 oz (99.0 kg)
5	Jamie Cook	British	St Cross	6 ft 2 in (1.88 m)	13 st 2 lb 12 oz (83.8 kg)	William Warr	British	Queens'	6 ft 5 in (1.96 m)	14 st 11 lb 11 oz (94.2 kg)
6	Michael di Santo	American	Trinity	6 ft 1 in (1.85 m)	14 st 4 lb 3 oz (90.8 kg)	Matthew Jackson	American	St Edmund's	6 ft 6 in (1.98 m)	14 st 11 lb 4 oz (94.0 kg)
7	Sam O'Connor	New Zealander	Christ Church	6 ft 1 in (1.85 m)	13 st 13 lb 5 oz (88.6 kg)	Ben Ruble	American	Hughes Hall	6 ft 2 in (1.88 m)	13 st 4 lb 15 oz (84.8 kg)
Stroke	Constantine Louloudis (P)	British	Trinity	6 ft 3 in (1.91 m)	14 st 7 lb 4 oz (92.2 kg)	Henry Hoffstot	American	Hughes Hall	6 ft 6 in (1.98 m)	14 st 5 lb 1 oz (91.2 kg)
Cox	William Hakim	British/American	University	5 ft 7 in (1.70 m)	8 st 8 lb 6 oz (54.6 kg)	Ian Middleton	British	Queens'	5 ft 8 in (1.73 m)	8 st 6 lb 3 oz (53.6 kg)
Sources: (P) – Boat club president

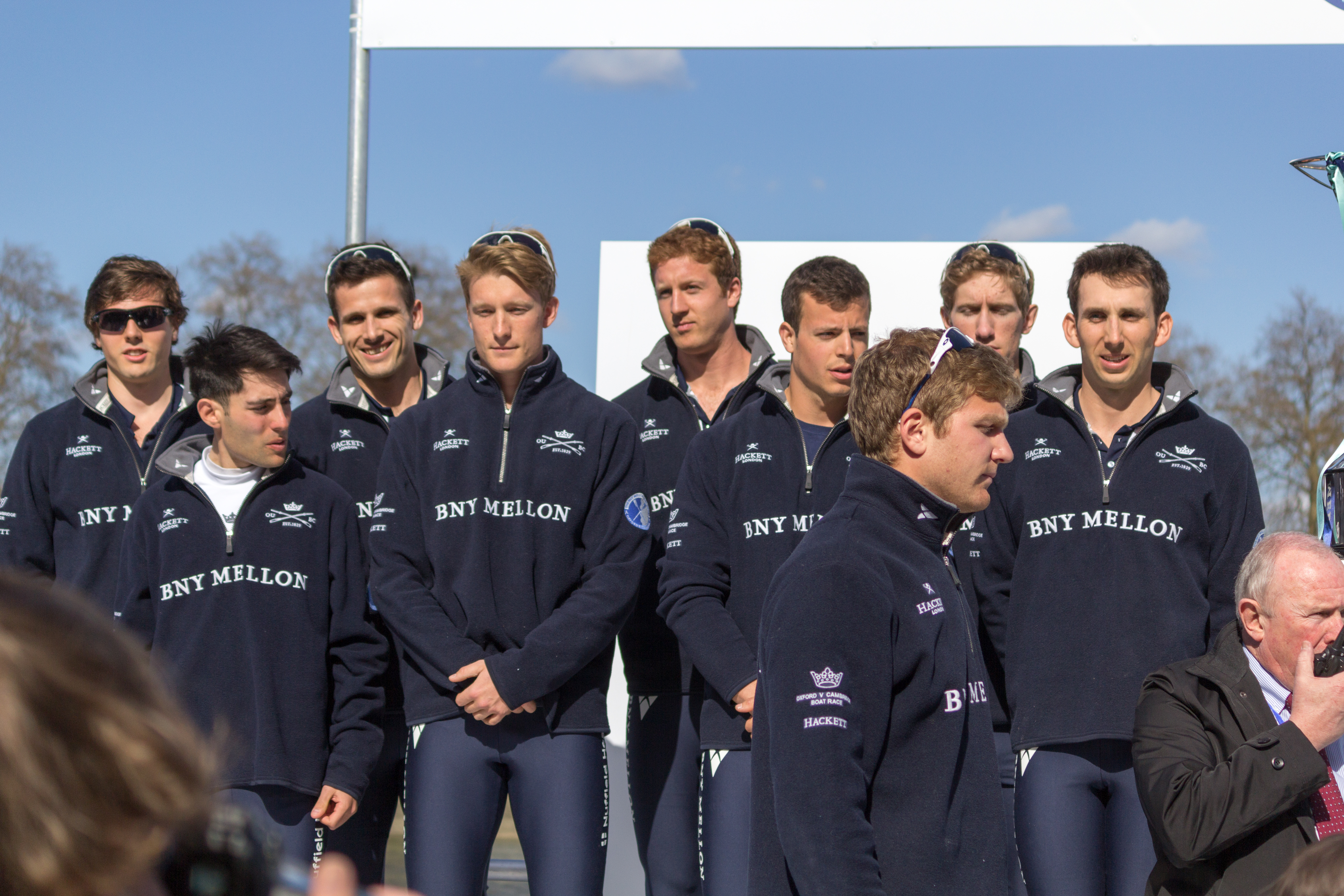
Oxford crew

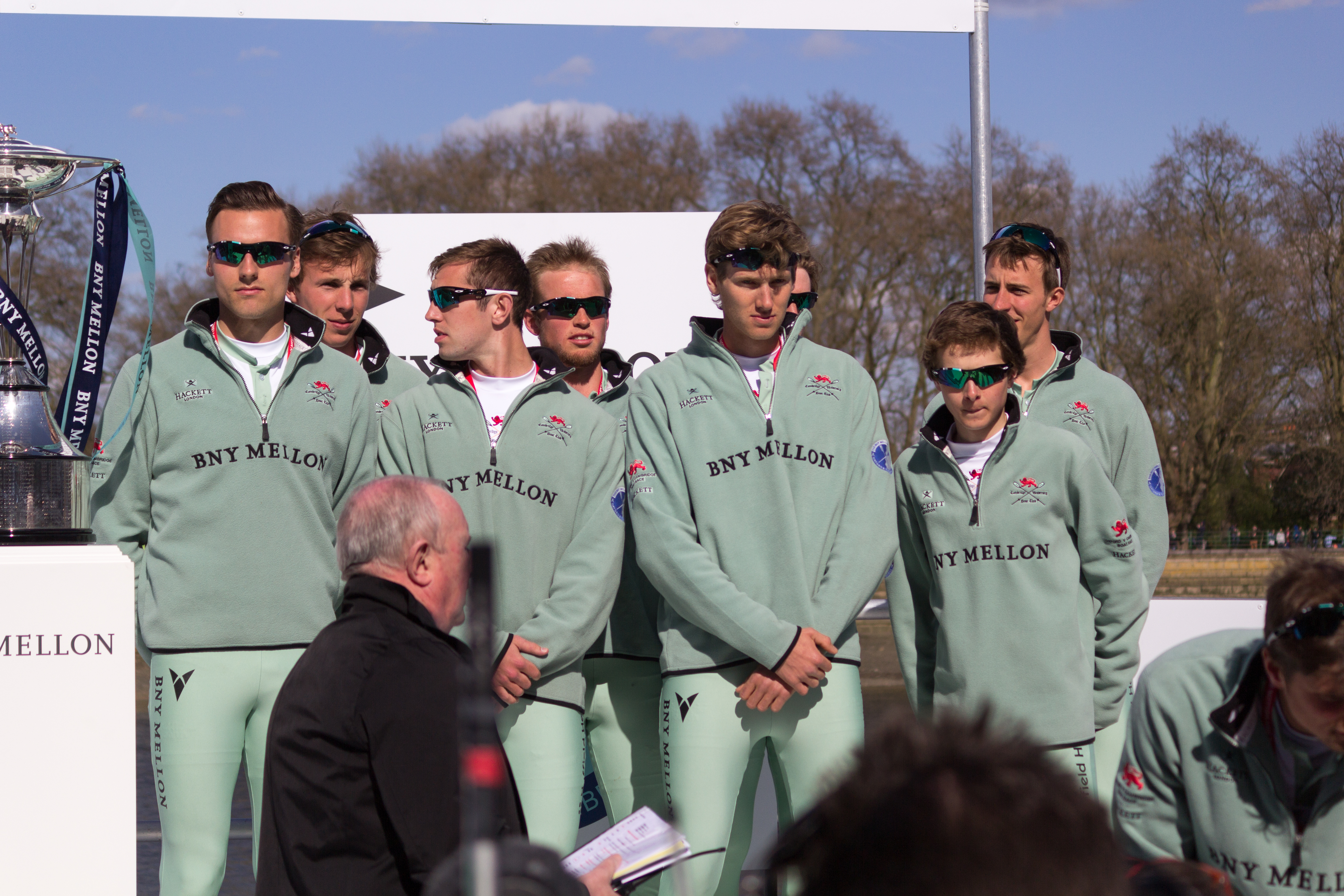
Cambridge crew

== Races ==
Over 250,000 spectators lined the Thames to watch the three races. Around eighty people needed to be rescued as the river level rose from the high tide and the wake of the flotilla.

=== Reserves ===
The women's reserve race, the 41st since 1968, was contested between Oxford's Osiris and Cambridge's Blondie on 10 April 2015. Osiris won by 15 lengths in a time of 18 minutes 58 seconds, their fourth consecutive victory and thirteenth win in the past fifteen years. It took the overall record in the event to 21–20 in CUWBC's favour.

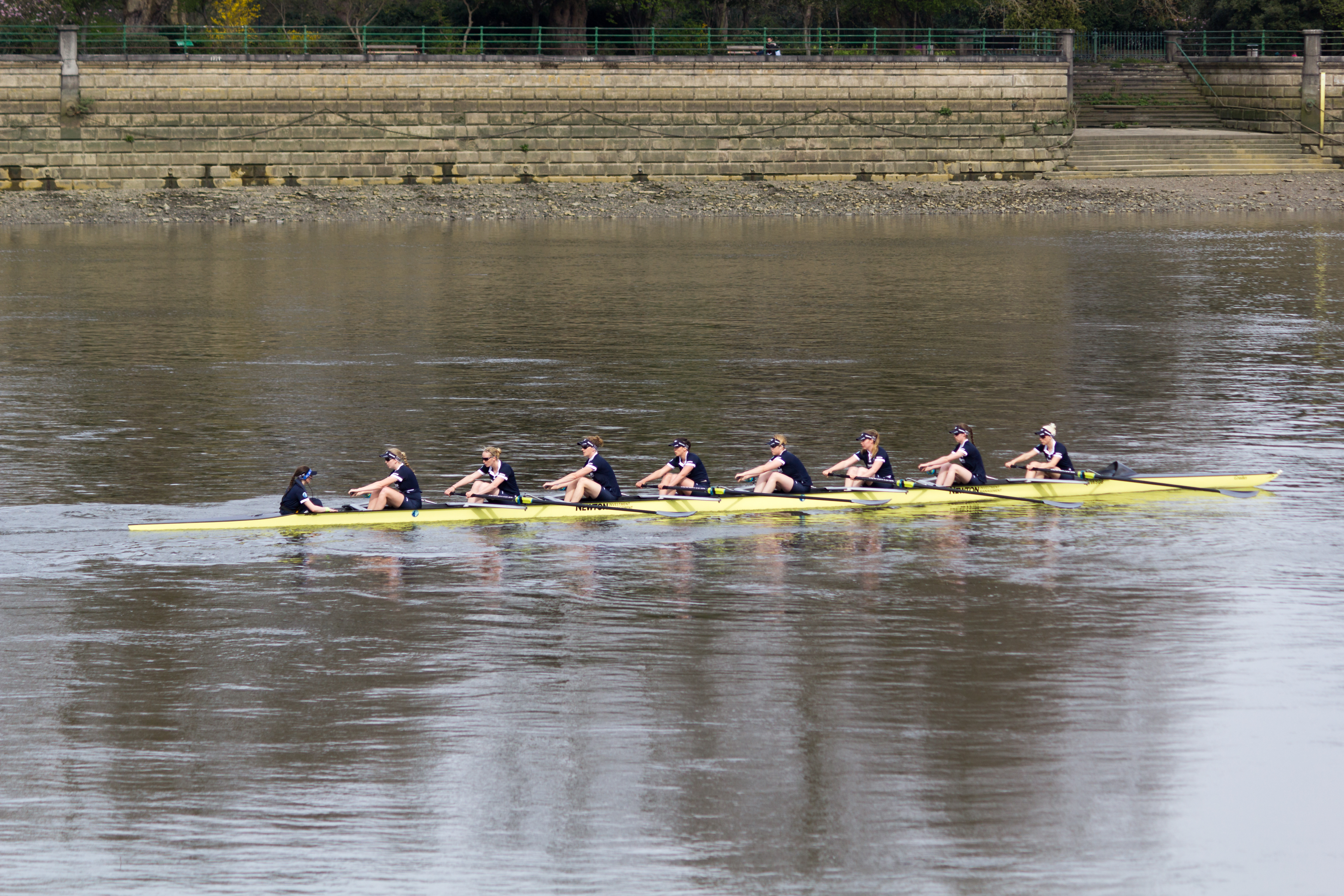
Oxford Women's Reserve Osiris boat

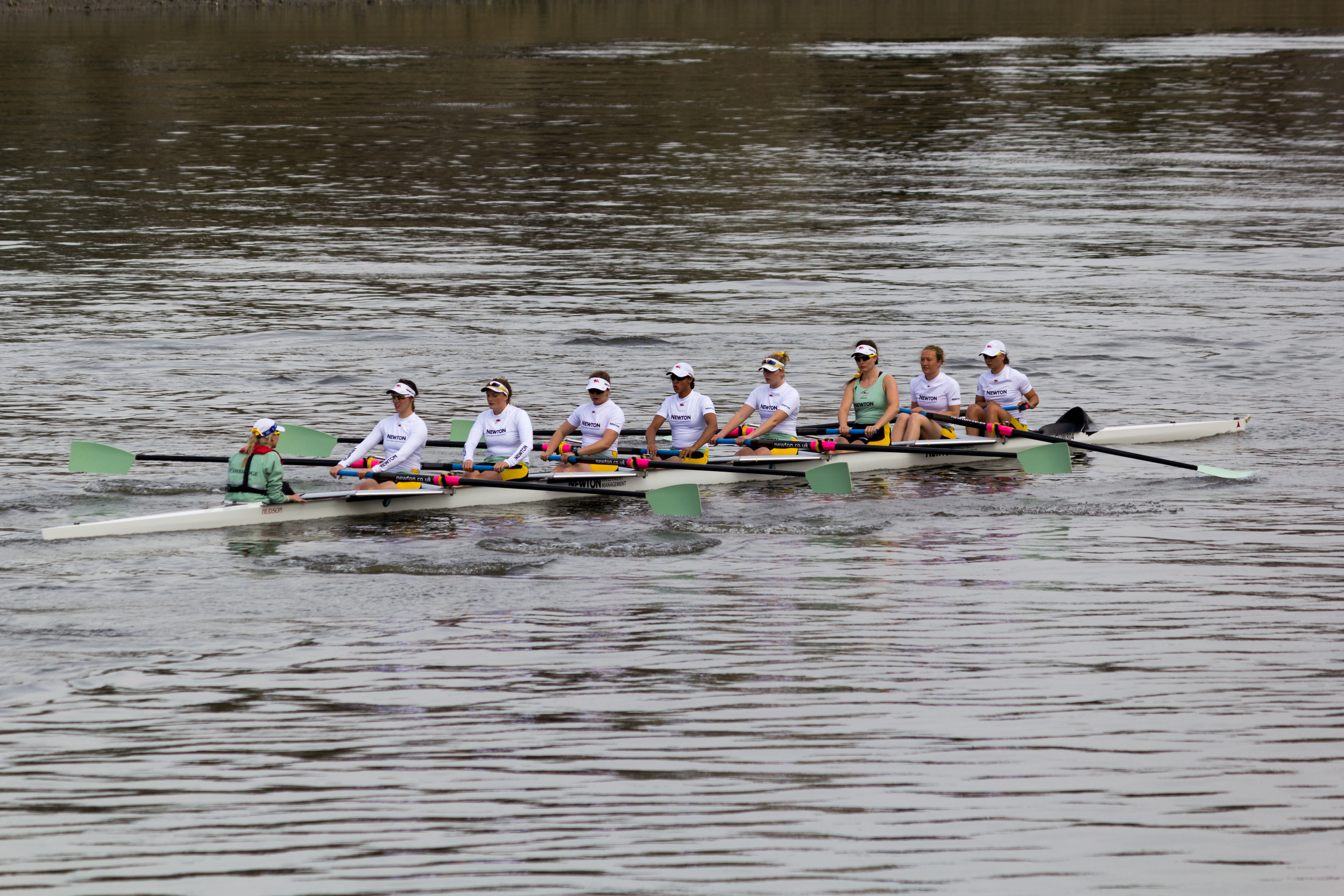
Cambridge Women's Reserve Blondie boat

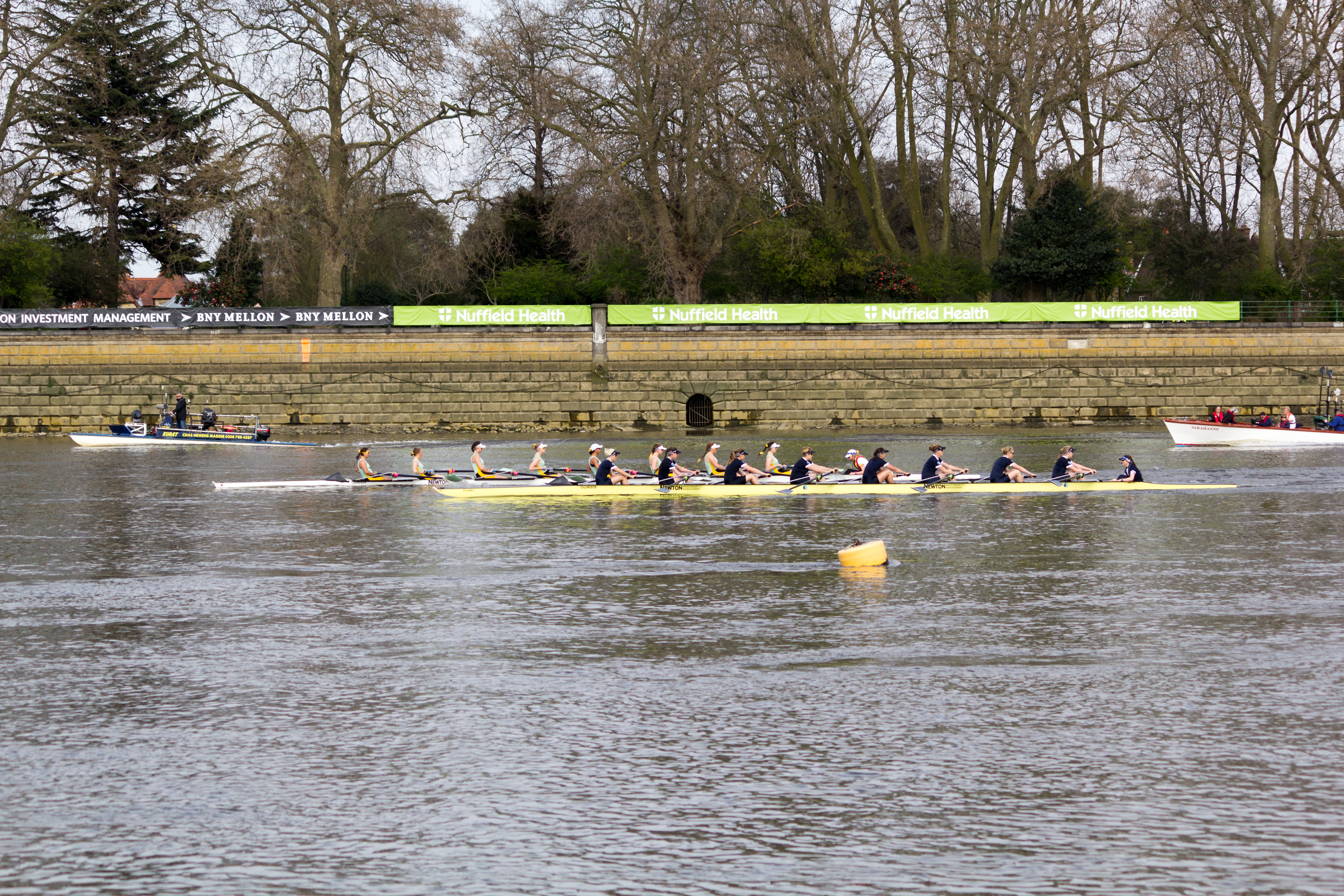
Women's Reserve race from the Putney Embankment

The men's reserve race was the 51st contest between Isis and Goldie, and started at 5:20 p.m. on 11 April 2015. The overall record in the event stood at 29–21 in Goldie's favour. The Light Blue reserves won the toss and elected to start from the Surrey station, handing the Middlesex side of the river to Isis. Goldie took an early lead, despite warnings from the umpire around Barn Elms, and Isis were behind by five seconds at Hammersmith Bridge. Coming round to St Paul's School, both crews came into a strong head wind and Isis rating 34 to Goldie's 36 began to close the gap. The crews were level by the Bandstand, but Isis had taken a half length lead by Barnes Bridge, and they pulled away again to win by three lengths. This was the fifth consecutive victory for Isis, taking the overall event to 29–22 in Cambridge's favour.

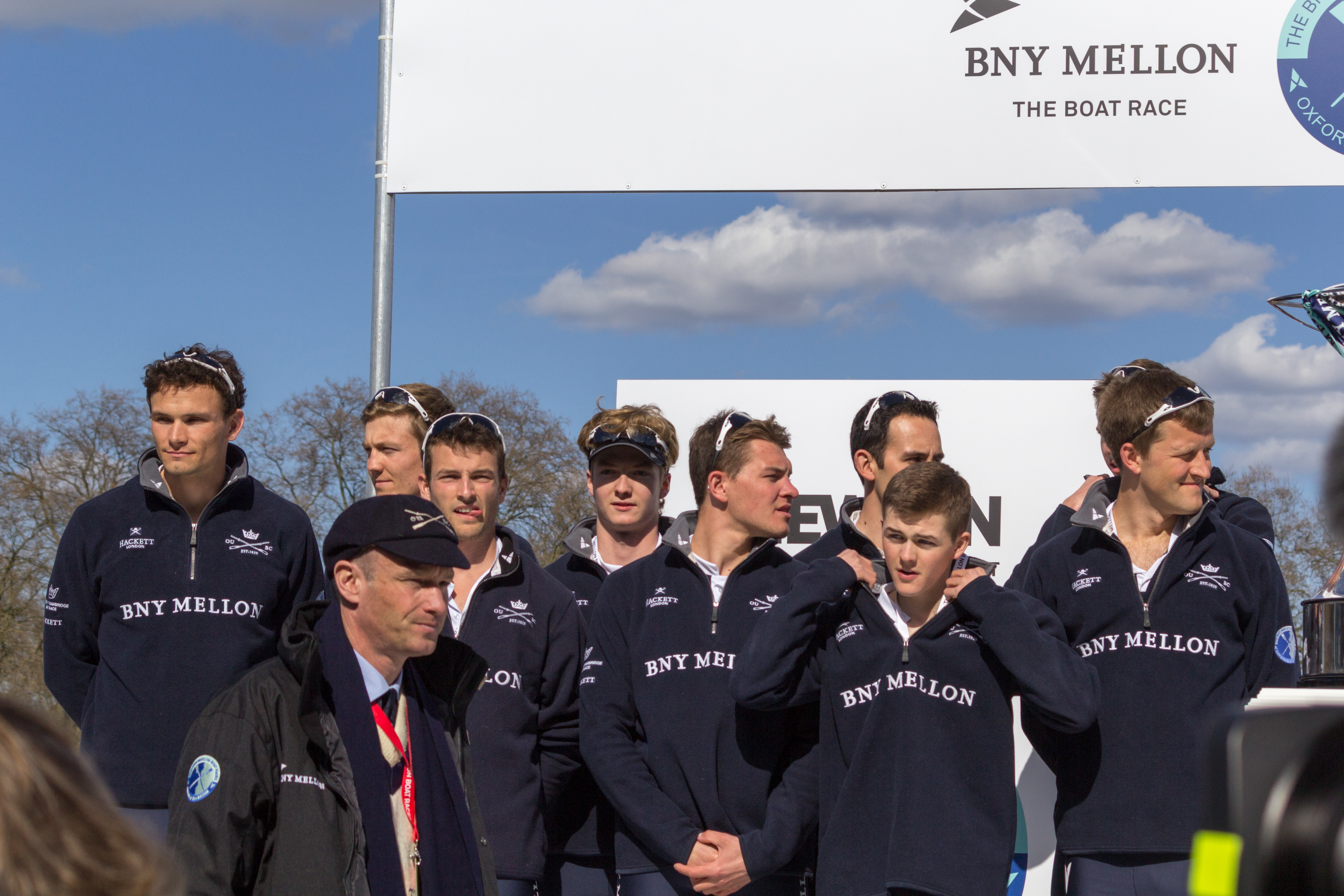
Oxford Men's Reserve Isis crew

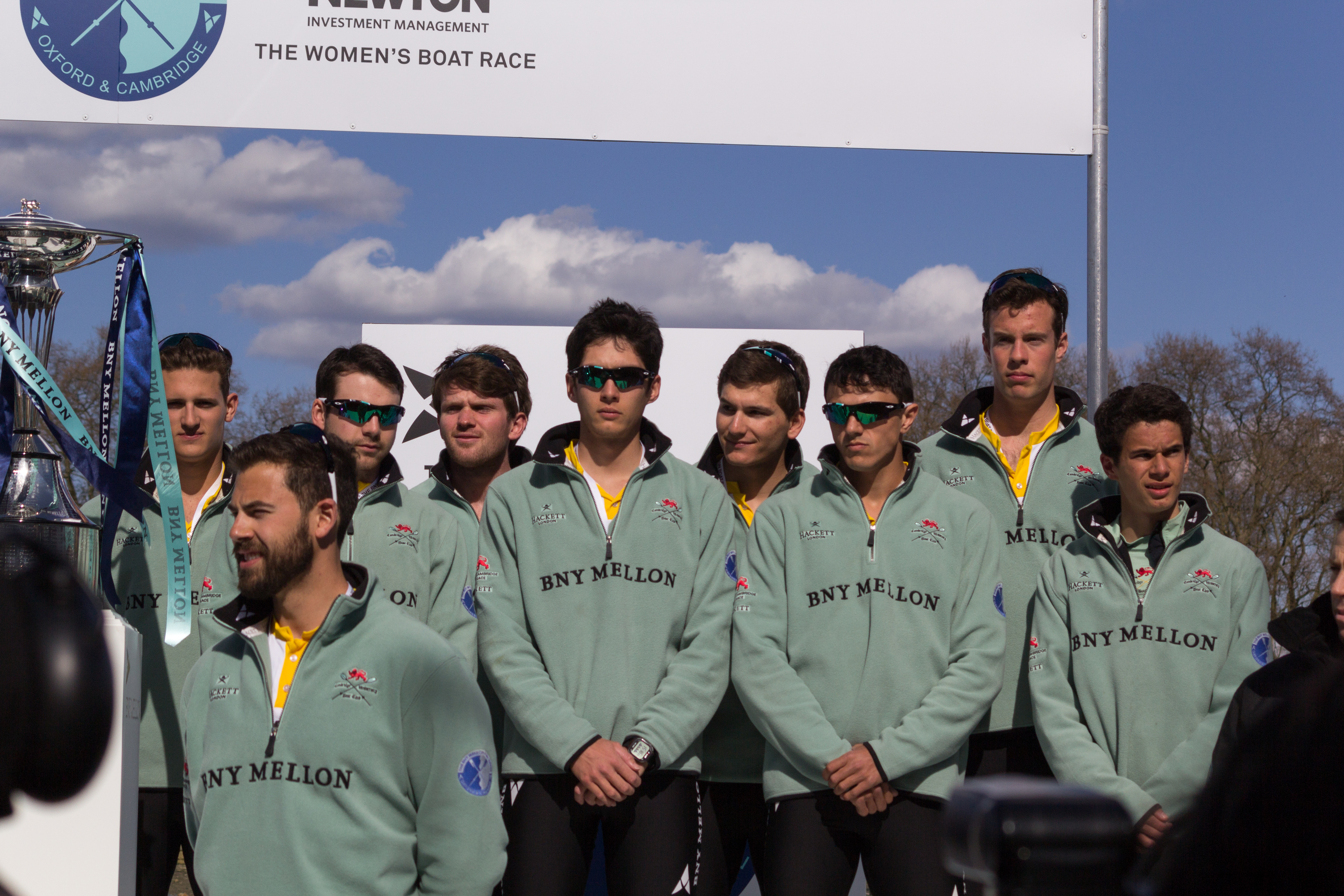
Cambridge Men's Reserve Goldie crew

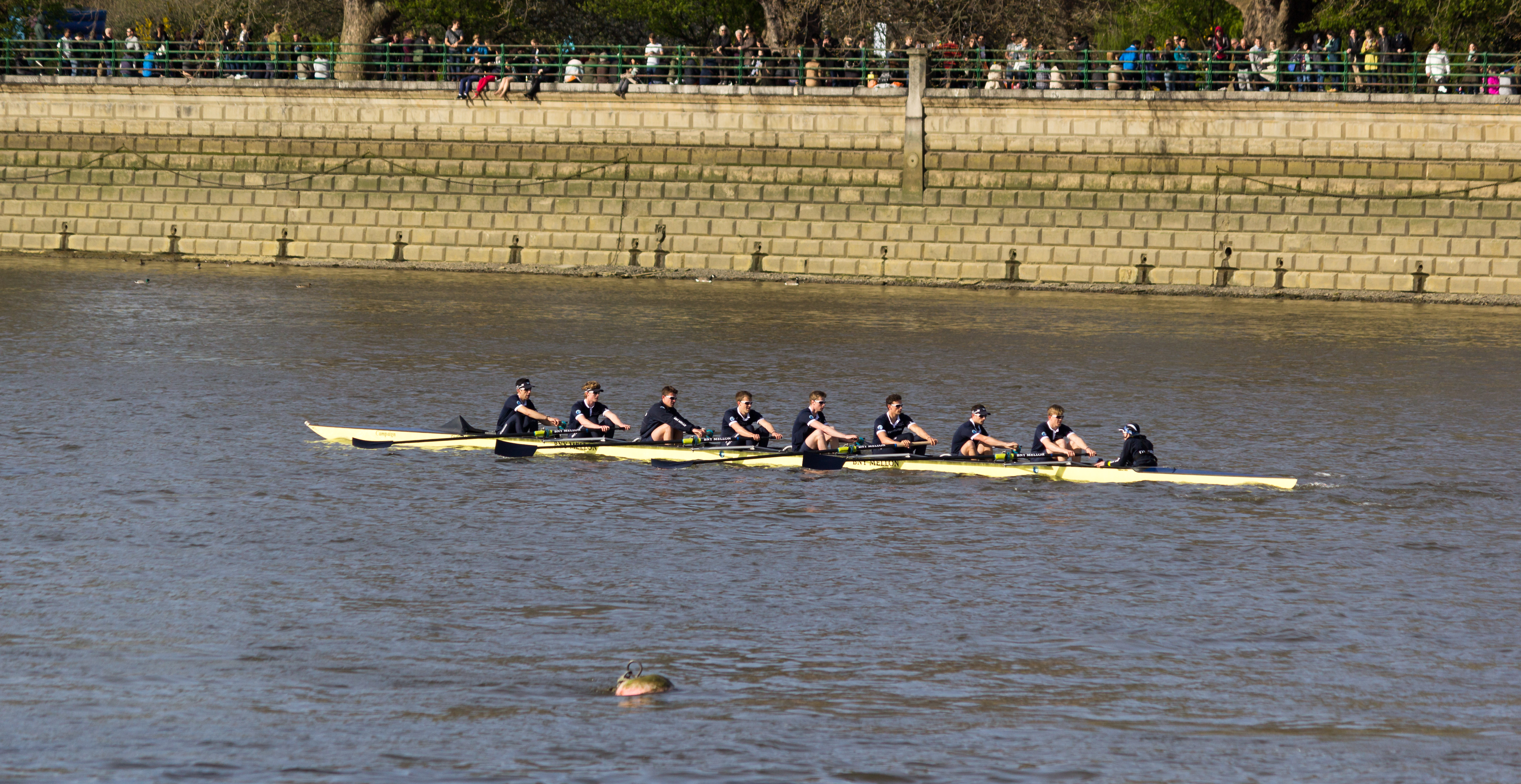
Oxford Men's Reserve Isis boat

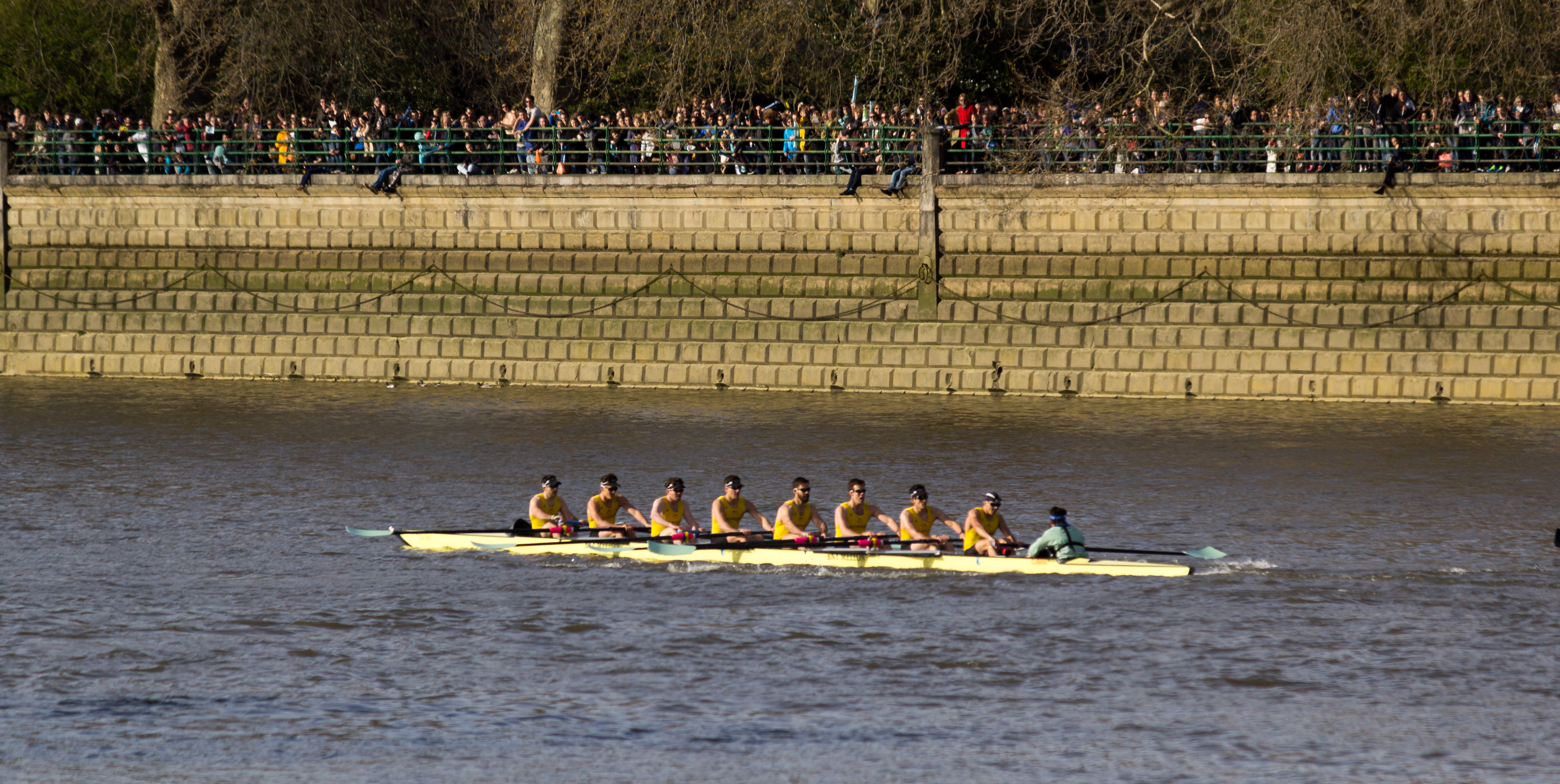
Cambridge Men's Reserve Goldie boat

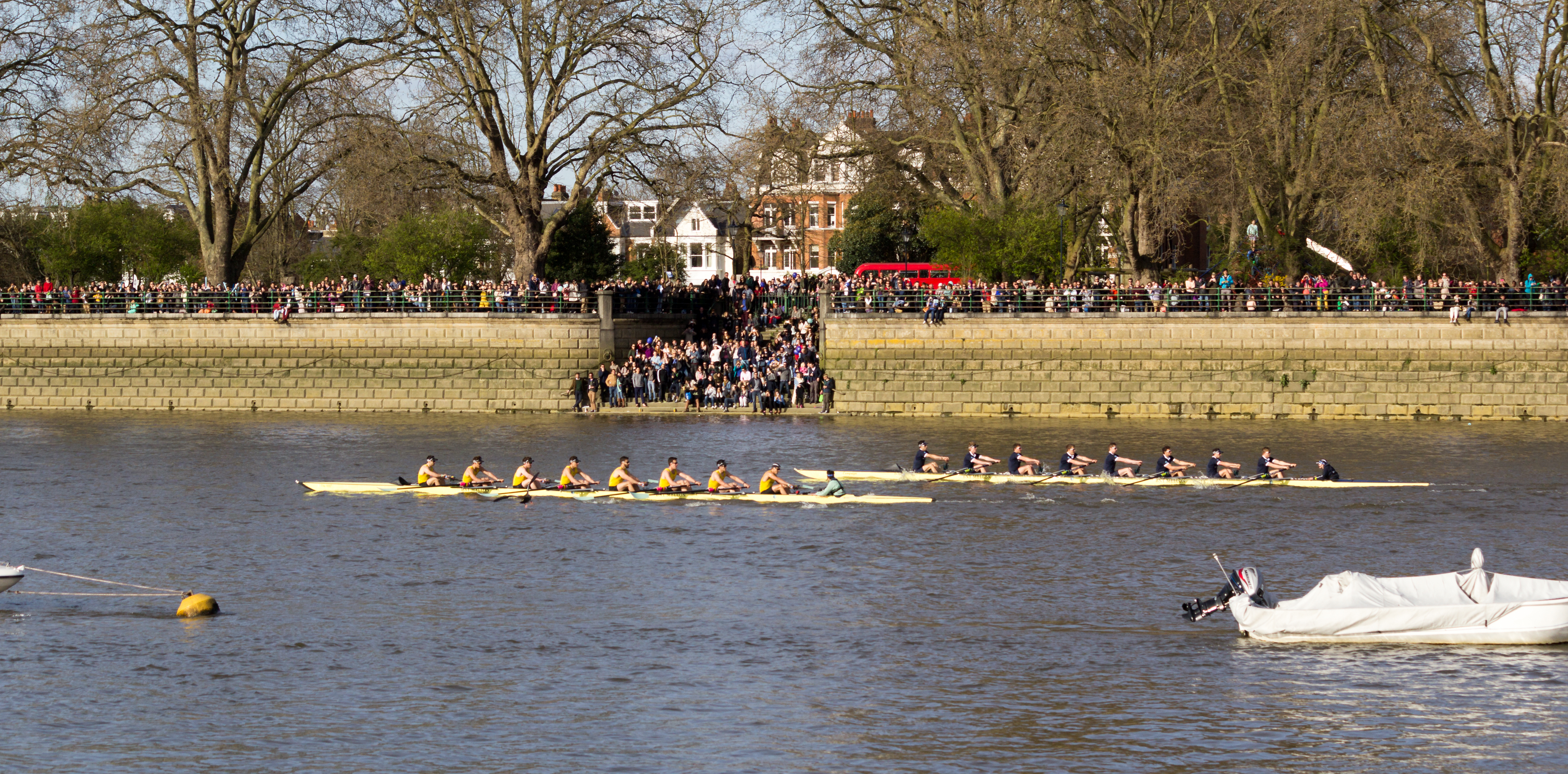
Men's Reserve race from the Putney Embankment

=== Main races ===
==== Women's ====
The women's race was the 70th contest between OUWBC and CUWBC, and started at 4:50 p.m. on 11 April 2015. The overall record in the event before the race stood at 41–28 in Cambridge's favour, but Oxford were considered favourites to win. Prior to the race, The Boat Race Company Limited announced that the two boats had been named to honour this auspicious occasion. Cambridge elected to name their boat Project Ely while Oxford had opted for Catalyst. OUWBC won the toss and elected to start from the Surrey station, handing the Middlesex side of the river to CUWBC. The conditions were sunny but very windy. OUWBC took an immediate lead and were five seconds ahead at the Mile Post. Despite out-rating their opponents, Cambridge failed to make any ground on Oxford, and were around three lengths down by St Paul's School. Approaching Barnes Bridge, Oxford's cox called for a push, and OUWBC passed below the central arch with a substantial lead. OUWBC won by a margin of six and a half lengths in a time of 19 minutes 45 seconds, taking the overall record to 41–29 in Cambridge's favour.

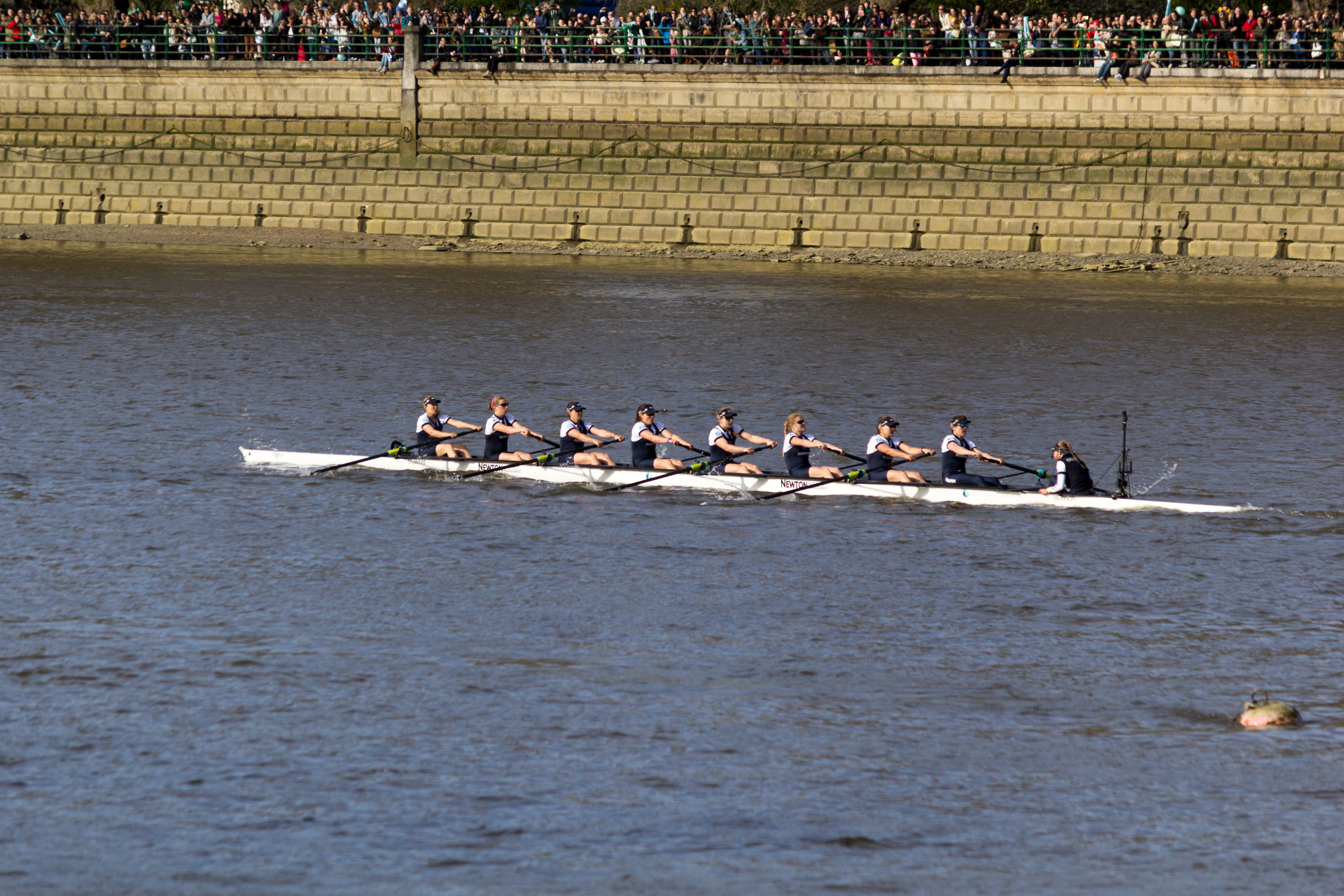
Oxford Women's Blues boat

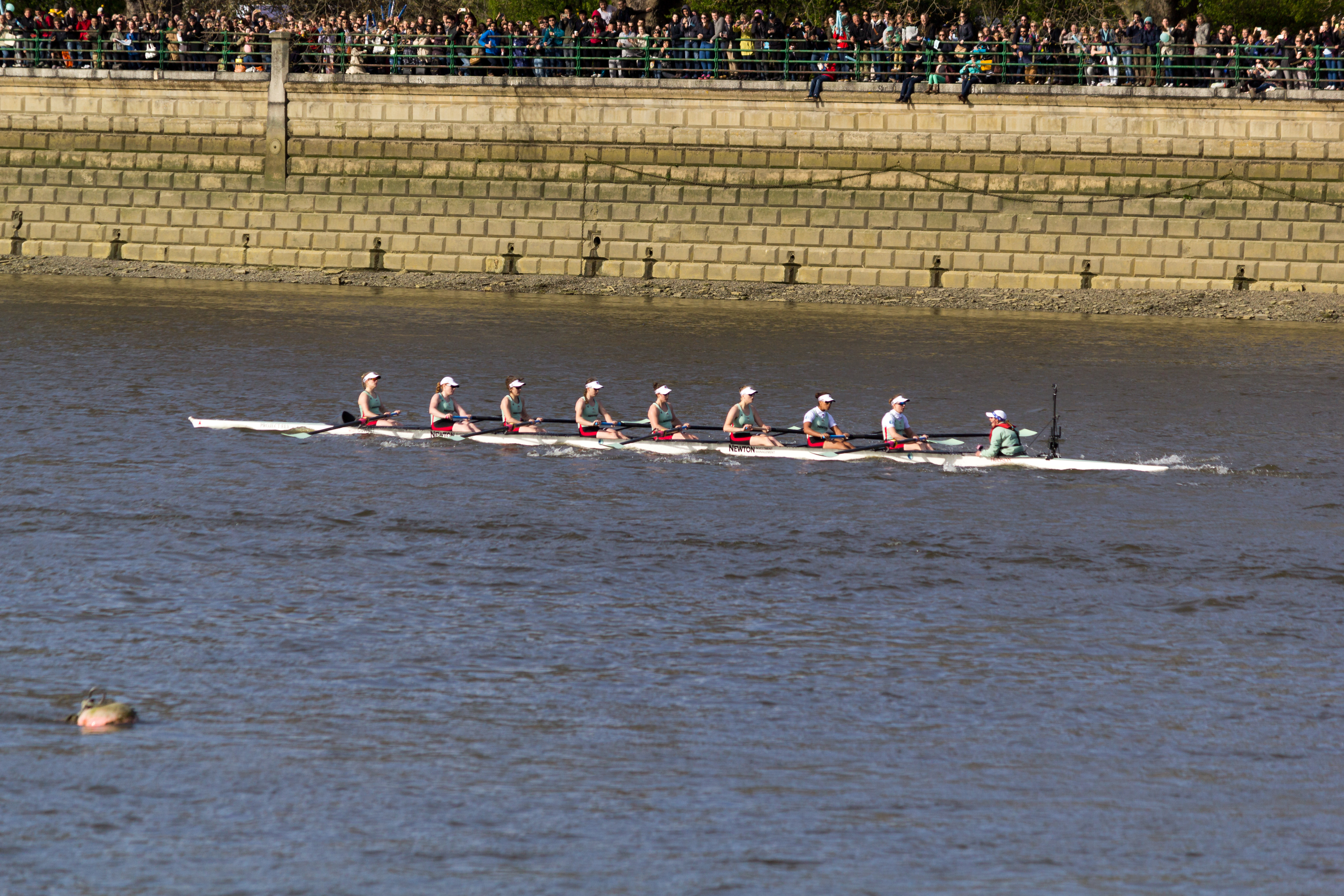
Cambridge Women's Blues boat

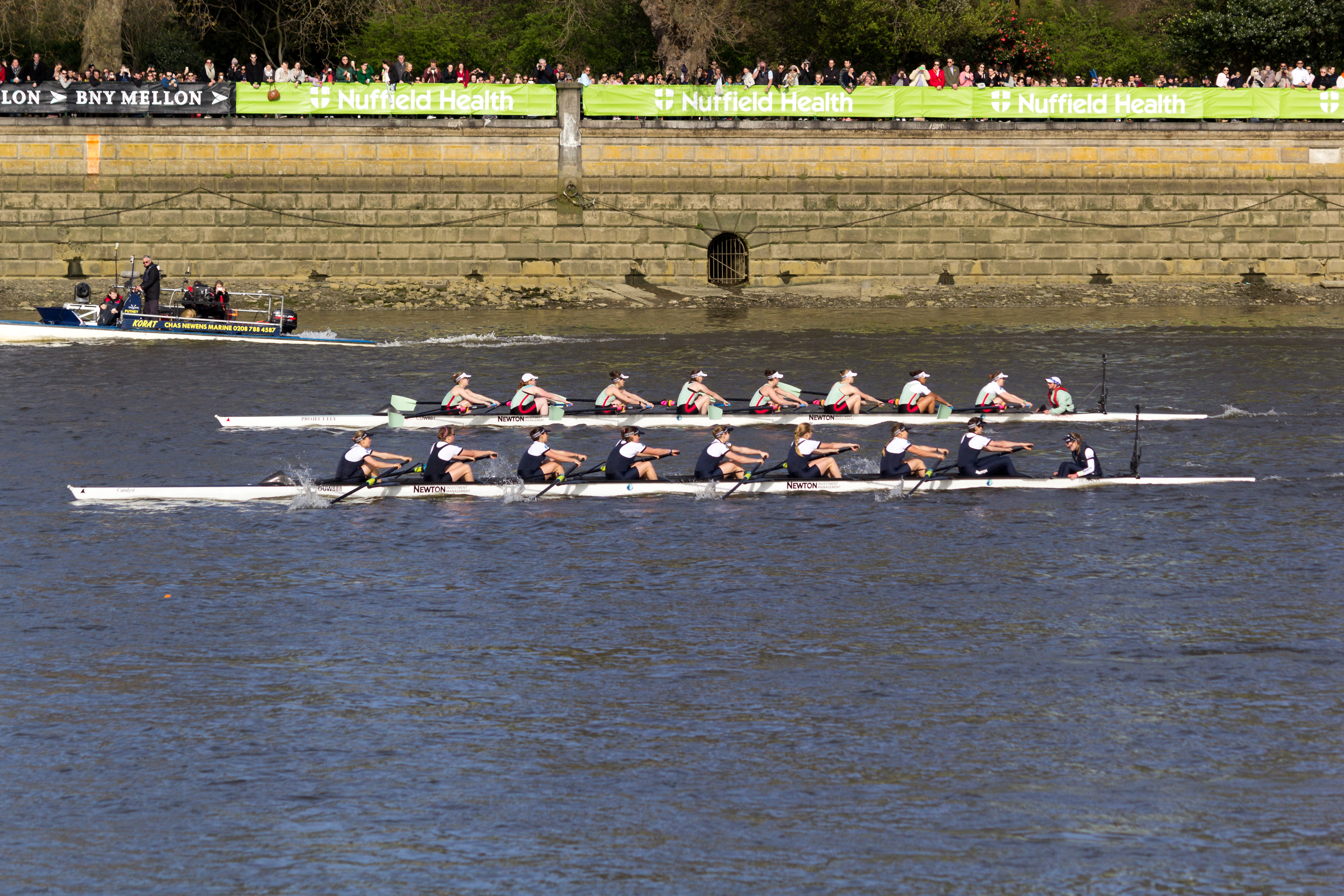
Women's race from the Putney Embankment

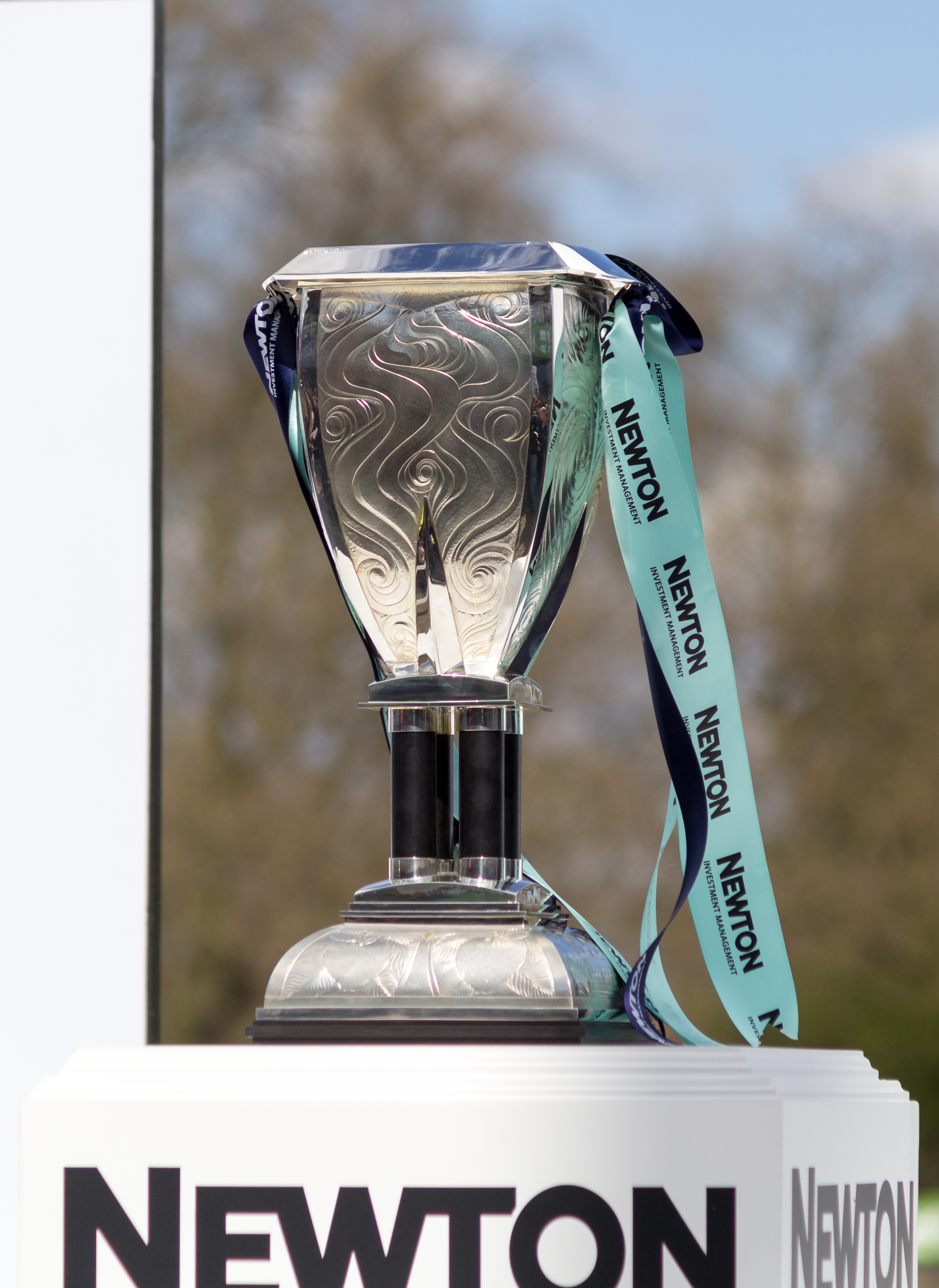
Women's race winner's trophy

==== Men's ====
The men's race was the 161st contest between OUBC and CUBC, and was held at 5:50 p.m on 11 April 2015. Prior to the race, the overall record in the event stood at 81–78 in Cambridge's favour, with one dead heat. The Dark Blues went into the race as the "strongest favourites in the history of the race". Cambridge won the toss and elected to start from the Surrey station, handing the Middlesex side of the river to Oxford. Oxford made the better start and were quickly ahead, with a quarter-length lead after a minute. Cambridge drew back into contention and held a canvas lead after two minutes where both crews were warned by Rankov as they closed. Cambridge marginally out-rated the Dark Blues as Oxford took a slight lead and were one second ahead by the Mile Post. Rankov issued further warnings as the crews passed beside Harrods Furniture Depository, Oxford half a length ahead, but with the Light Blues holding the advantage of the bend in the river as they approached Hammersmith Bridge.

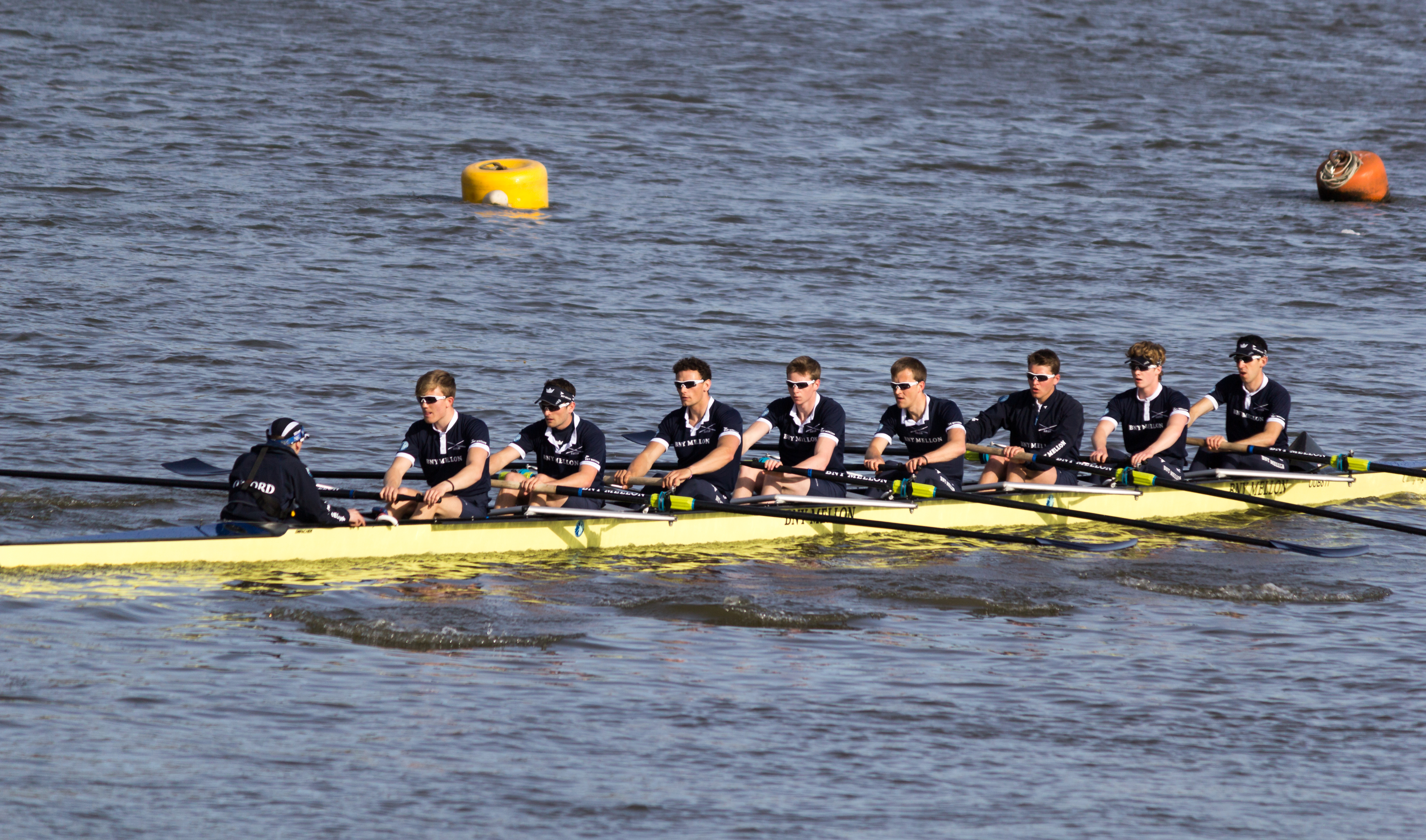
Oxford Men's Reserve boat

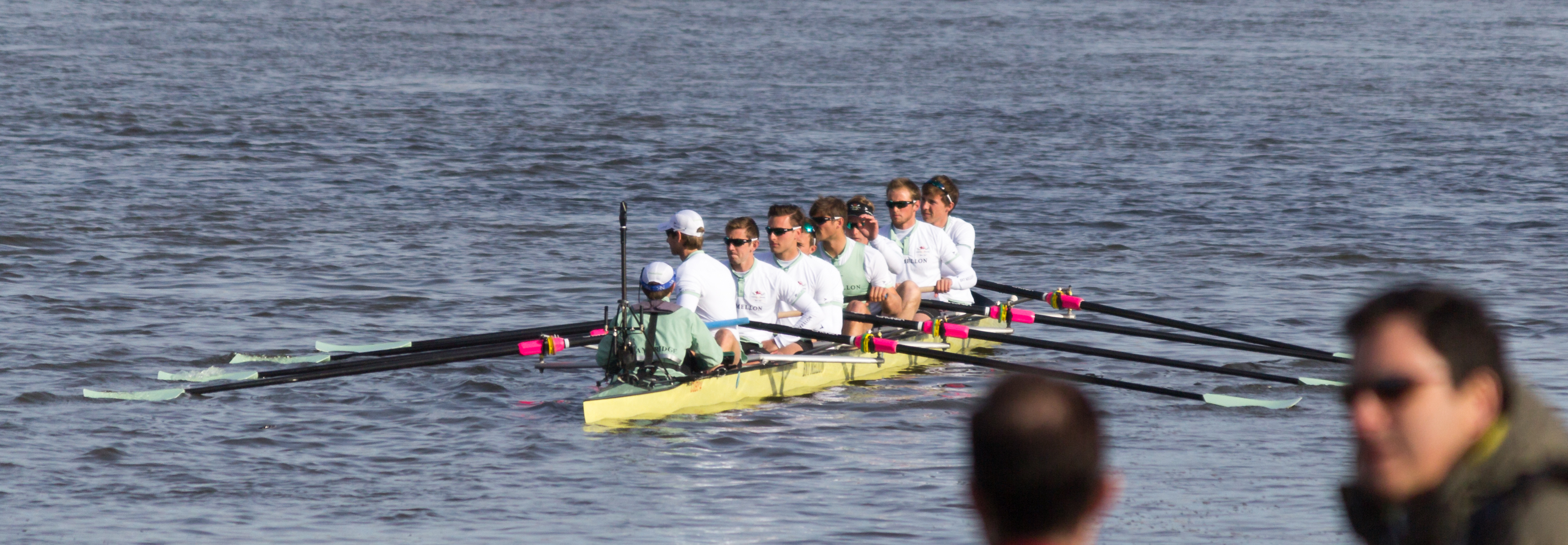
Cambridge Men's Blues boat

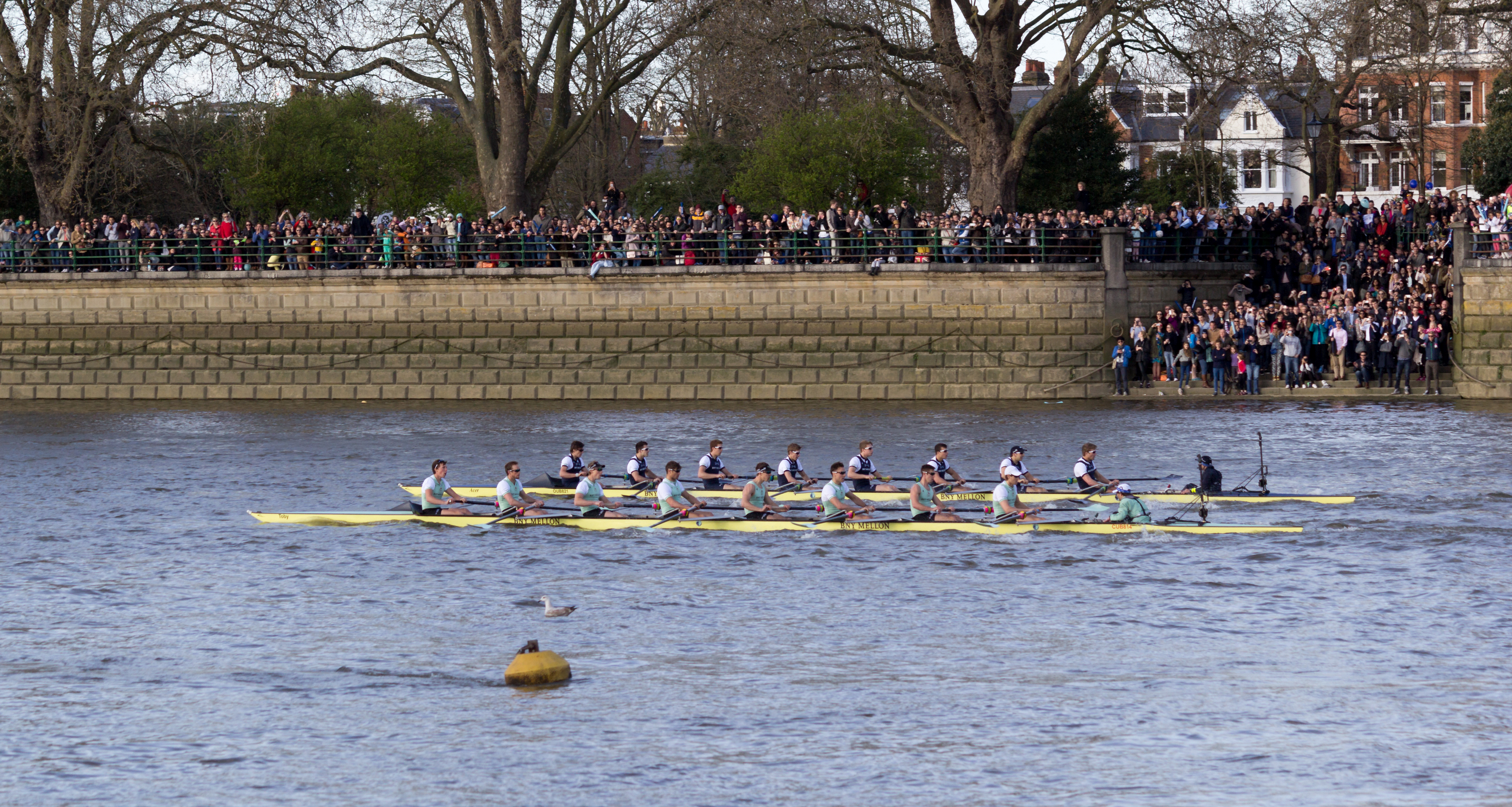
Men's race from the Putney Embankment

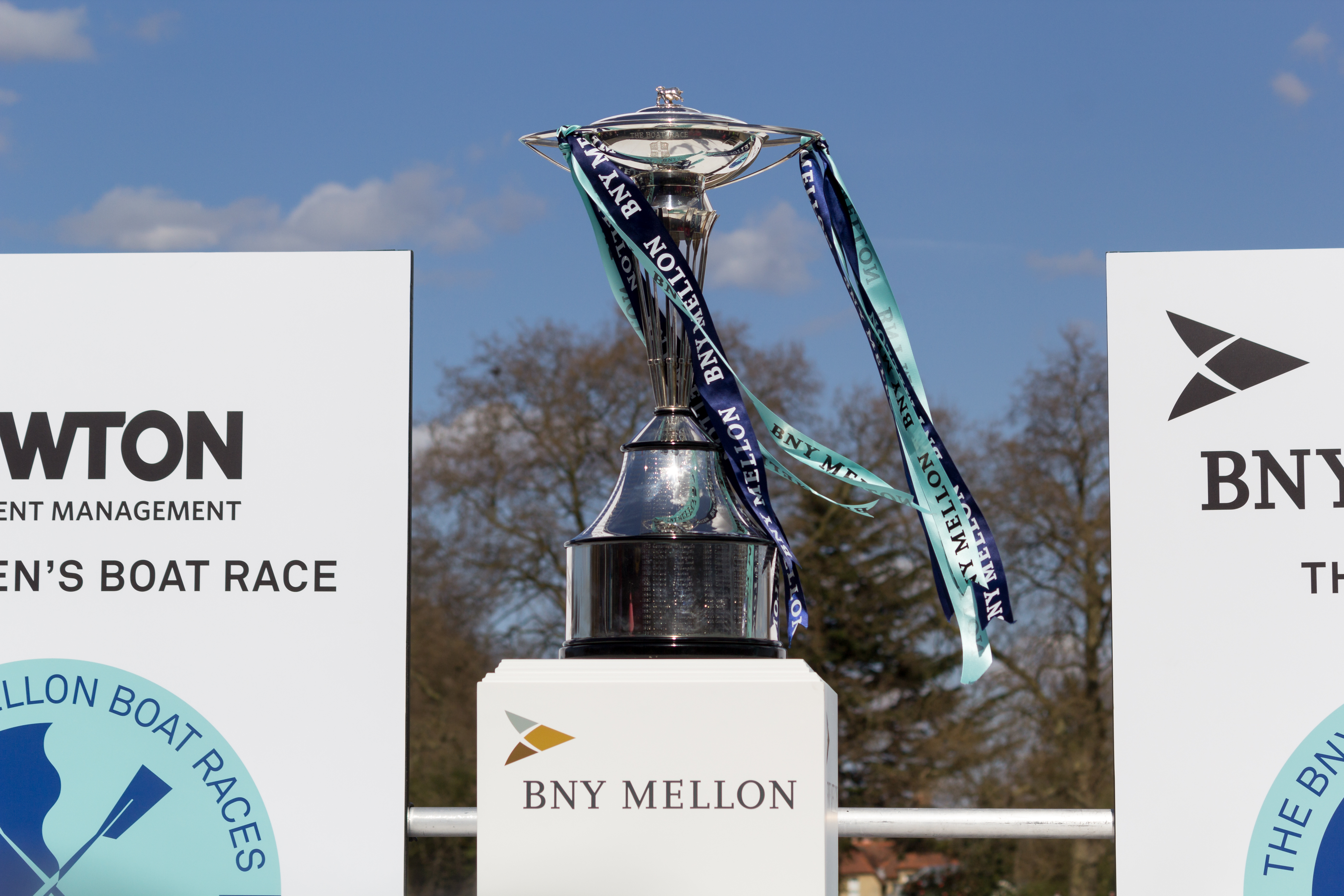
Men's race winner's trophy

Cambridge failed to make the best of the bend, and Oxford went clear after a push, taking an additional half a length and crossed in front of the Light Blues nine minutes into the race. The Dark Blues were over a length clear by the end of Chiswick Eyot and continued to pull away, holding a seven-second lead by Chiswick Steps. Passing through Barnes Bridge, Oxford were around five lengths ahead. Oxford passed the finishing post six and a half lengths ahead in a winning time of 17 minutes 34 seconds. It was the Dark Blues' third consecutive victory and took the overall record in the event to 81–79 in Cambridge's favour.

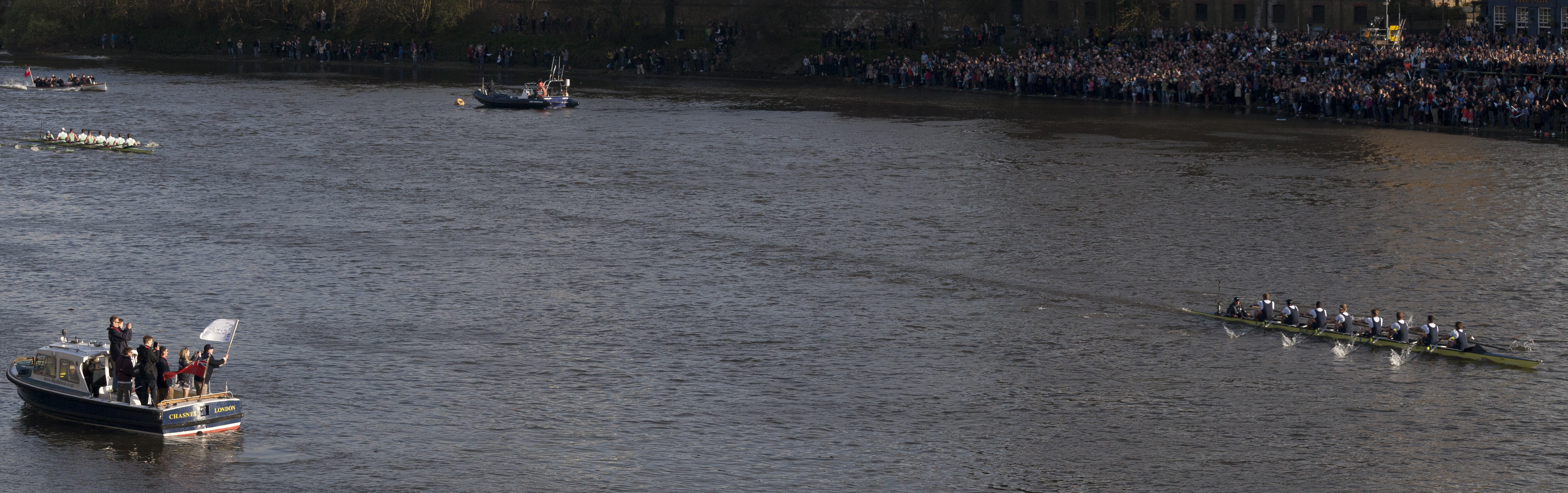
Oxford's Men's VIII leading at the finish

== Reaction ==
The trophies were presented to the winning crews by the five-time Olympic gold medallist Steve Redgrave. OUWBC's winning president Chitty said "It's a really special moment, something I've been working towards for three years" while her counterpart Reid accepted that Cambridge "didn't get off to [their] best start and Oxford did" and that the conditions were "pretty horrendous around the halfway mark with the wind against the tide and some pretty high waves". Oxford's stroke Davies said: "I'm so glad we can be role models to all the young women out there." Cambridge's coach Baker noted "We’ve got a young crew that has come a long way and they raced their best ... We’ve improved quite a lot, but it just wasn’t good enough".

The Cambridge's men's president Leichter was generous in defeat: "It was 100% fair. It was very painful but they took us round the outside of Surrey and we couldn't respond" while four-time winner Louloudis was content: "We stuck to our plan and executed a really good race". Oxford's coach Bowden said of his eleven victories with the Dark Blues in the event, "they are all different and tough but we came together well". He went on to honour the former Oxford coach Dan Topolski who had died in February: "We definitely had Dan in our hearts throughout the campaign and we’re just so pleased to have won in style for him".
